= Ragini MMS (franchise) =

Indian erotic-horror franchise of films and web series

- Created by: Balaji Motion Pictures; ALT Entertainment
- Original work: Ragini MMS

Films and television
- Film(s): Ragini MMS; Ragini MMS 2

Audio
- Soundtrack(s): Ragini MMS; Ragini MMS 2

Miscellaneous
- Web series: Ragini MMS: Returns; Ragini MMS: Returns 2

Ragini MMS is an Indian erotic-horror franchise of films and Web series created by Balaji Motion Pictures and ALT Entertainment. The two films of this series were released in 2011 and 2014 respectively. A web series, Ragini MMS: Returns, premiered on ALT Balaji on 19 October 2017. The second season of the web series Premiered on 18 December 2019 on ALT Balaji & Zee5 apps.

== Overview ==
=== Ragini MMS ===
A young woman goes out on a weekend trip to a deserted farmhouse with her scheming lover. However, the couple soon witnesses a series of paranormal events.

=== Ragini MMS 2 ===
A director attempts to shoot an erotic horror movie in a house where, unbeknown to him, a demonic spirit resides. Even before the crew starts filming, the spirit possesses the lead actress's body.

== Films ==
Film	Release date	Director	Screenwriter(s)	Story by	Producer(s)
Ragini MMS	13 May 2011	Pawan Kripalani	Pawan Kripalani, Vaspar Dandiwala	Pawan Kripalani	Ekta Kapoor, Shobha Kapoor, Amit Kapoor, Sidhartha M. Jain
Ragini MMS 2	21 March 2014	Bhushan Patel	Tanveer Bookwala, Ishita Moitra	Tanveer Bookwala, Ishita Moitra	Ekta Kapoor, Shobha Kapoor

== Web Series ==
Title	Release date	Director	Written by	Cast	Network
Ragini MMS: Returns (Season 1)	19 October 2017	Suyash Vadhavkar	Kamayani Vyas and Nikhil Vyas	Karishma Sharma, Siddharth Gupta, Riya Sen, Nishant Singh Malkani and Dilnaz Irani	ALTBalaji and ZEE5
Ragini MMS: Returns (Season 2)	18 December 2019	Suyash Vadhavkar	Kamayani Vyas and Nikhil Vyas	Divya Agarwal, Varun Sood, Navneet Kaur, Thea Dsouza and Sunny Leone	ALTBalaji and ZEE5

=== Overview ===
Ragini MMS: Returns is an Indian erotic horror web series produced under ALTBalaji. The series is the third installment in this franchise. The series is directed by Suyash Vadhavkar and Shahriyar Afsan Ovro and produced by Ekta Kapoor and Shobha Kapoor.

The first season starred Karishma Sharma, Riya Sen and Siddharth Gupta. It premiered on ALTBalaji and ZEE5 on 19 October 2017. The second season starred Sunny Leone, Divya Agarwal, Varun Sood in the leading roles. It premiered on 18 December 2019.

== Cast and characters ==
Character	Film			Web series	
Character	Ragini MMS (2011)	Ragini MMS 2 (2014)	Ragini MMS 3 (TBA)	Ragini MMS: Returns (Season 1) (2017)	Ragini MMS: Returns (Season 2) (2019)
Ragini	Kainaz Motivala	Kainaz Motivala	Kainaz Motivala	Kainaz Motivala (archived)	Kainaz Motivala (archived)
The Witch / Ghost	Mangala White	Geetanjali Kulkarni	TBA	Raquib Arshad	
Uday	Rajkumar Rao	Mentioned only	R. Madhavan	Rajkumar Rao (archived)	Rajkumar Rao (archived)
Vishal	Rajat Paul				
Piya	Janice				
Neha	Shernaz				
Jigar	Vinod Rawat				
Friend 1	Harshraj Shroff				
Friend 2	Cristy Philips				
Friend 3	M. Ravichandran Thevar				
Sunny Leone		Herself		Herself (archived)	Herself (archived)
Kriti Sanon			Herself		
Satya Kumar		Saahil Prem	TBA		
Rocks		Parvin Dabas	TBA		
Monali		Sandhya Mridul	TBA		
Maddy		Karan Veer Mehra	TBA		
Gina		Anita Hassanandani			
Dr. Meera Dutta		Divya Dutta			
Tanya Kapoor		Soniya Mehra			
Kunal Khanna		Karan Taluja			
Special appearance in a song		Yo Yo Honey Singh			
Ragini 2				Karishma Sharma	Divya Agarwal
Rahul				Siddharth Gupta	Varun Sood
Simran				Riya Sen	
Raj				Nishant Singh Malkani	
Kavita				Dilnaz Irani	
Principal Rajat Kapoor				Harssh A. Singh	
Old Woman/Anshuman				Raquib Arshad	
Chowkidar Raju				A. R. Rama	

== Crew ==
Character	Film		Web series
Character	Ragini MMS (2011)	Ragini MMS 2 (2016)	Ragini MMS Returns (2017)
Director	Pawan Kripalani	Bhushan Patel	Suyash Vadhavkar
Producer(s)	Ekta Kapoor; Shobha Kapoor; Amit Kapoor; Sidhartha M. Jain	Ekta Kapoor; Shobha Kapoor	Ekta Kapoor; Shobha Kapoor
Screenplay	Pawan Kripalani; Vaspar Dandiwala	Tanveer Bookwala; Ishita Moitra	Kamayani Vyas; Nikhil Vyas
Story	Pawan Kripalani	Tanveer Bookwala; Ishita Moitra	Kamayani Vyas; Nikhil Vyas
Composer(s)	Shamir Tandon; S D Burman; Bappi Lahri; Faizan Hussain; Agnel Roman	Chirantan Bhatt; Meet Bros Anjjan; Yo Yo Honey Singh; Pranay Rijia; Amar Mohile	Ripul Sharma; George Joseph
Cinematography	Tribhuvan Babu	Mehul Gadani	Anubhav Bansal
Editor	Pooja Ladha Surti	Arnav Das	Nitin FCP; Prashant Panda

== Release and revenue ==
Film	Release date	Budget	Box office revenue
Ragini MMS	13 May 2011	₹13 million (US$130,000)	₹99.4 million (US$1.0 million)
Ragini MMS 2	21 March 2014	₹190 million (US$2.0 million)	₹632 million (US$6.6 million)
Total		₹230 million (US$2.4 million) Two films	₹731 million (US$7.6 million) Two films

== Awards ==
=== Ragini MMS (2011) ===
Best Searchlight Film – Ekta Kapoor
