= Neha Saxena =

Neha Saxena may refer to:

- Neha Saxena (film actress) (born 1989), Indian film actress
- Neha Saxena (TV actress), Indian television actress
