= Anupriya Kapoor =

Indian television actress

- Born: 26 November 1990 (age 35); Punjab, India
- Occupation: Television actress
- Years active: 2010–2018
- Spouse: Varun Sharma (m. 2022)
- Relatives: Vyom Kapoor (brother)

Anupriya Kapoor is an Indian television actress. She is known for playing Taani Banerjee in Star Plus's Tere Liye and Suman in Yeh Hai Aashiqui opposite Harshad Chopda and Shakti Arora respectively.

== Personal life ==
Anupriya Kapoor moved to Mumbai with brother Vyom Kapoor when she participated in Voice of India. Her parents are separated and she lives with her mother, younger brother and her grandma. She has completed her graduation in Political Science through a correspondence course from Delhi University.

== Career ==
Kapoor started her career with Star One's Miley Jab Hum Tum. Later she appeared in Yash Raj TV's Seven, in Ssshhhh...Phir Koi Hai and in Rishta.com. From 2010 to 2011, Kapoor portrayed Taani Banerjee in Star Plus's Tere Liye opposite Harshad Chopda. In 2013 she shot an episode for Bindass's Yeh Hai Aashiqui opposite Shakti Arora. In 2015, she played Vibha in MTV India's Warrior High.

== Awards ==
In 2016, she was honoured with Delhi Gaurav Award.

== Filmography ==
=== Television ===
| Year | Title | Role |
|---|---|---|
| 2010 | Miley Jab Hum Tum | Suhaani Shergill |
| 2010 | Seven | Malini |
| 2010 | Ssshhhh...Phir Koi Hai | Mandira Mehra/Shalvari |
| 2010 | Rishta.Com | Special Appearance |
| 2010–2011 | Tere Liye | Taani Banerjee Ganguly |
| 2010 | Yeh Rishta Kya Kehlata Hai | Taani |
| 2011 | Jee Le Ye Pal | Herself |
| 2013 | Yeh Hai Aashiqui | Suman |
| 2014 | Halla Bol | Sanjana |
| 2015 | Warrior High | Vibha Anand |
| 2015 | Code Red | Jennifer |
| 2015–2016 | Bhagyalaxmi | Divya/Bhoomi Prajapati |
| 2018 | Laal Ishq | Unknown |

== Awards ==
| Year | Award | Category | Show | Result |
|---|---|---|---|---|
| 2010 | Indian Telly Awards | Best Debut (Female) | Tere Liye | Won |
| 2010 | Indian Television Academy Awards | Best Debut Actress Female | Tere Liye | Won |
