= Nishant Singh Malkani =

Indian actor

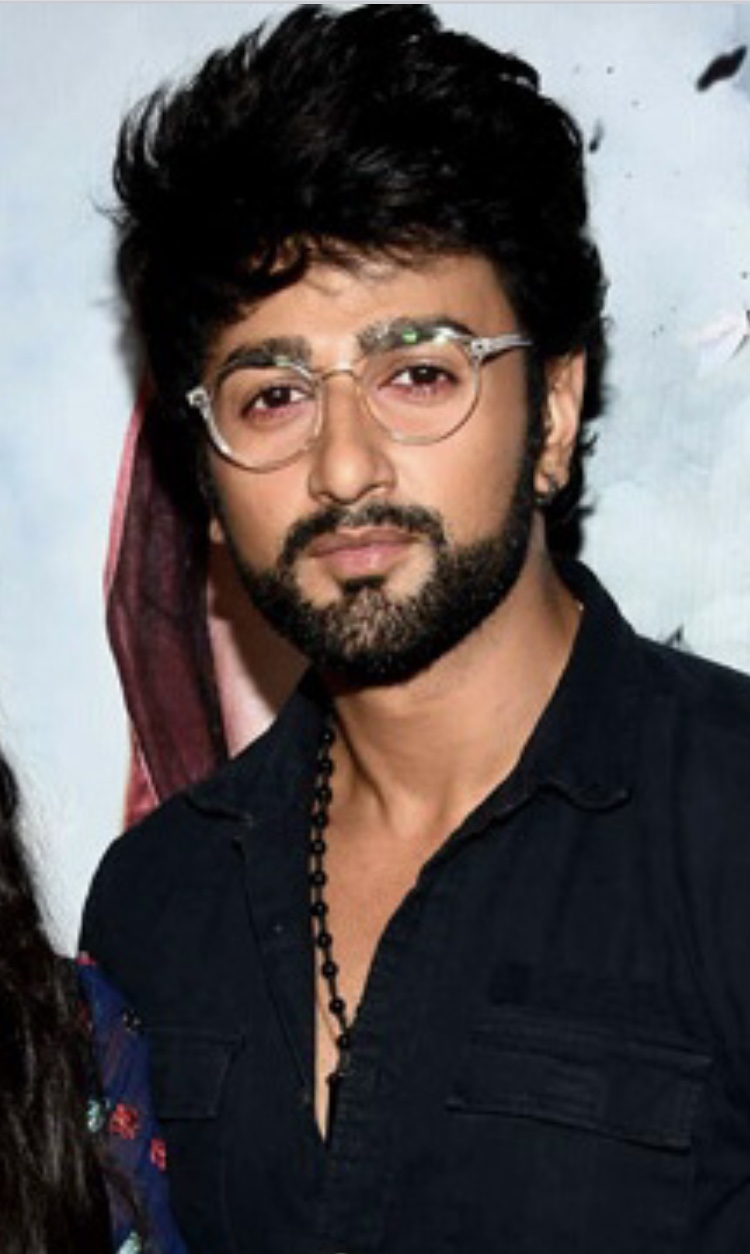
- Malkani in 2020
- Born: 1 September 1987 (age 39); Dubai, United Arab Emirates
- Citizenship: India
- Occupation: Actor
- Years active: 2009–present

Nishant Singh Malkani (born 1 September 1987) is an Indian television actor and model. He began his acting career in 2009 with "Miley Jab Hum Tum" portraying the character of Adhiraj Singh. He is well-known for his roles as Akshat Jindal in "Guddan Tumse Na Ho Payega" and Anukalp Gandhi in "Preet Se Bandhi Ye Dori Ram Milaayi Jodi". In 2020, he participated as a contestant in Bigg Boss 14.

== Early life ==
Malkani was born on 1 September 1987 in Dubai. He comes from a Sindhi family. He went to Laxman Public School in New Delhi for his early education. Later, he graduated from Shaheed Bhagat Singh College and then completed his MBA from Kolkata.

== Career ==
Malkani's first television role was in Star One's romantic drama Miley Jab Hum Tum as Adhiraj Singh which he began in 2009. It wrapped up in 2010. He portrayed Anukalp Gandhi in Ram Milaayi Jodi on Zee TV in 2010 but quit in 2011 to search for film work.

Later, he made his debut in the Vikram Bhatt film "Horror Story" in 2013. He also appeared in other films such as "Bezubaan Ishq," "Cute Kameena," and "Love Training".

In 2017, Malkani made his debut in web series, portraying the character Raj in "Ragini MMS: Returns".

He made a comeback to television in September 2018 portraying the lead Akshat Jindal in Zee TV's Guddan Tumse Na Ho Payega, until he quit the series in 2020. It is regarded as his best and most lovable performance ever in his career.

In 2020, Malkani participated in the reality show Bigg Boss 14 as a contestant. He survived for 5 weeks before getting evicted.

== In the media ==
Nishant Malkani was ranked 10th in the Times Of India's 20 Most Desirable Men on Television 2020.

He was ranked at 44th position in Times of India's 50 Most Desirable Men of 2020.

== Filmography ==
=== Films ===
Year	Title	Role	Notes	Ref(s)
2013	Horror Story	Achint	Debut movie	
2015	Bezubaan Ishq	Swagat		
2015	Ishq Ne Krazy Kiya Re	Aditya		
2016	Cute Kameena	Bunty		
2025	Mastiii 4	Sid Walia		

=== Television ===
Year	Title	Role	Notes	Ref(s)
2009–2010	Miley Jab Hum Tum	Adhiraj Singh		
2010–2011	Preet Se Bandhi Ye Dori Ram Milaayi Jodi	Anukalp Gandhi		
2012	Hum Ne Li Hai... Shapath	Sameer		
2018–2020	Guddan Tumse Na Ho Payega	Akshat Jindal		
2020	Bigg Boss 14	Contestant	Evicted Day 31	
2021–2022	Rakshabandhan... Rasal Apne Bhai Ki Dhal	Umed Pratap Singh and Shivraj Umed Pratap Singh/Balwant Singh		
2022	Control Room	ACP Ayushman sharma		
2023–2024	Pashmina – Dhaage Mohabbat Ke	Raghav Kaul		

==== Special appearances ====
Year	Title	Role	Notes	Ref(s)
2010	Sasural Genda Phool	Raj	Cameo	
2011	Pavitra Rishta	Anukalp	Crossover special	
2011	Pyaar Kii Ye Ek Kahani	Himself	Special dance performance with Sanaya Irani	
2015	Swaragini - Jodein Rishton Ke Sur	Himself	Dance performance	
2017	Jhalak Dikhhla Jaa 9	Himself	To support Salman Yusuff Khan	
2018	Kundali Bhagya	Akshat	Dance performance	
2019	Yeh Teri Galiyan	Akshat	Crossover special	
2021	Meet	Himself	Guest appearance	
2022	Kumkum Bhagya: Pyaar Wali Holi	Himself	Dance performance	

=== Web series ===
Year	Title	Role	Platform	Notes
2017–2018	Ragini MMS:	Raj	ALTBalaji and ZEE5	
2022	Shubh Mangal Mein Dangal	Vishwanath (Vishu)	Hungama Play and MX Player	
2023	Johri	Neeraj Bodi	Atrangii	
2024	Heartbeats	Dr. Sandeep	MX Player	
2025	Rishqiyaan: Dil, Dosti aur Dhokha	Raghav	Pocket TV	Microdrama
