= Ketki Kadam =

Indian Actress

Ketaki Kadam
- Born: Pune, Maharashtra
- Occupations: Model, Actress
- Years active: 2012–present

Ketki or Ketaki Kadam is an Indian Television and Film actress who appeared as Humaira on Zee TV's Qubool Hai opposite Rishabh Sinha / Vikrant Massey / Mohit Sehgal where she played the parallel lead role in the show.

== Career ==
In 2014, after Qubool Hai, she made an appearance as the younger Radha on Star Plus's mythological saga Mahabharat. In the same year, she started working in Sony Entertainment Television's show produced by DJ's a Creative Unit which was earlier known under the working title Banaras ka Bunty and was then known as Hum Hain Na. In this show, Kadam was supposed to play the parallel lead role of Satya, a girl who is in love with the lead character Bunty Kanwar Dhillon.

In 2015, she did a show Sarojini on Zee TV as Indira Singh. In the year 2017, Kadam was cast in the role of Shikha Vashisht in Star plus show Iss Pyaar Ko Kya Naam Doon 3 .In 2018 she did Zing TV Pyaar Pehli Baar as Vaidehi.

In an Instagram Live, she had claimed that she was part of Boogie Woogie (TV series) and was selected, but she missed the chance to make it to Boogie Woogie for personal reasons.

== Accolades ==
Year	Award	Category	Work	Result
2026	Universal India Awards	Consistent Performer of the Year	—N/a	Won

== Filmography ==
Key
†	Denotes films that have not yet been released

Year	Title	Role	Language	Notes
2025	Vaajav Re	Seema	Marathi	Released 8 August 2025

== Television ==
Year	Name	Role	Channel
2012–14	Qubool Hai	Humaira Siddiqui/Humaira Haider Shaikh	Zee TV
2014	Mahabharat	Radha	Star Plus
2014	Hum Hain Na	Satya	Sony TV
2015	Sarojini - Ek Nayi Pehal	Indira Singh	Zee TV
2017	Iss Pyaar Ko Kya Naam Doon 3	Shikha Narayan Vashisht	Star Plus
2018	Pyaar Tune Kya Kiya	Vaidehi	Zing TV
2019	Laal Ishq	Jia (Episode 90)	And TV
2019	Laal Ishq	Arshi (Episode 113)	And TV
2019	Laal Ishq	Maya (Episode 142)	And TV
2019	Laal Ishq	Revati (Episode 183)	And TV
2019	Shrimad Bhagwat Mahapuran	Gayatri Mata (Episode 30)	Colors TV
2021	Aapki Nazron Ne Samjha	Nirali	Star Plus
2022	Rang Jaun Tere Rang Mein	Shristi Chaubey/ Shristi Dhruv Pandey	Dangal TV
2025	Gehna Zevar Ya Zanjeer	Kajiri Rathod	Dangal TV

== Vertical Shows ==
Year	Name	Role	Application
3rd September 2025	Billion Dollar Waiter	Riya Kashyap	Kuku TV
4th December 2025	Billionaire Bana Bodyguard	Tanvi	Kuku TV
5th December 2025	Sweeper King	Sejal	Story TV
17th March 2026	Bhootiya Mithai	Saumya	Tuk Tuki
4th June 2026	Pati, Patni aur Panga	Jaya Desai	Kuku TV
