= Mohit Sehgal =

Indian television actor (born 1985)

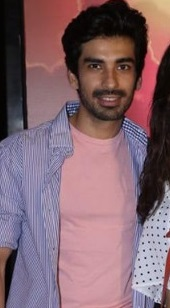
- Sehgal in 2019
- Born: 3 December 1985 (age 40)
- Occupation: Actor
- Years active: 2008–2021
- Known for: Miley Jab Hum Tum; Nach Baliye; Love Ka Hai Intezaar
- Spouse: Sanaya Irani (m. 2016)

Mohit Sehgal (born 3 December 1983) is an Indian television actor. He is known for his roles in Miley Jab Hum Tum, Sarojini - Ek Nayi Pehal and Naagin 5.

== Career ==
After an unnoticed role in the 2007 film Delhii Heights, Sehgal entered TV industry playing Samrat Shergill, one of the leads opposite Sanaya Irani in the daily soap Miley Jab Hum Tum (2008–2010) which aired on Star One.

In 2010 he hosted Zara Nachke Dikha and Meethi Choori No 1. After participating in Zor Ka Jhatka: Total Wipeout, he played supporting roles in Saath Nibhaana Saathiya and Parichay — Nayee Zindagi Kay Sapno Ka.

Sehgal next portrayed Siddharth in Star Plus's Mujhse Kuchh Kehti...Yeh Khamoshiyaan opposite Mrunal Thakur(2012–2013). In last quarter of 2013, he was chosen to enact the role of Haider Sheikh opposite Ketki Kadam in romantic drama Qubool Hai until his exit in 2014. He was also seen in Tumhari Paakhi of Karan.

He was then roped in as the lead Somendra Singh in Sarojini (2015–2016) opposite Shiny Doshi. Sehgal next appeared in Box Cricket League before emerging as a second runner-up with Irani through participation in the dance reality series Nach Baliye.

In July 2017, he signed Star Plus's Love Ka Hai Intezaar where he was cast as Ayaan Mehta alongside Preetika Rao. 3 years later, he returned to screen with the fifth season of Ekta Kapoor's famous supernatural franchise Naagin in 2020 as antagonist Jay Mathur alongside Surbhi Chandna and Sharad Malhotra.

== Personal life ==
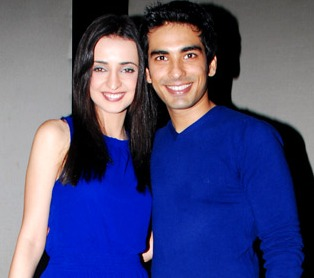
Sehgal with wife Irani

Sehgal met actress Sanaya Irani on the sets of Miley Jab Hum Tum and they eventually began dating. They announced their relationship on 19 November 2010, the last day of the series shoot. In December 2015, the couple got engaged. Sehgal married Irani on 25 January 2016 in a traditional Hindu wedding ceremony in Goa.

== Filmography ==
=== Films ===
| Year | Title | Role | Notes | Ref(s) |
|---|---|---|---|---|
| 2007 | Delhi Heights | | | |
| 2021 | Badnaam | Kabir Kaul | | |

== Television ==
| Year | Name | Role | Ref |
|---|---|---|---|
| 2008–2010 | Miley Jab Hum Tum | Samrat Shergill | |
| 2009 | Dill Mill Gaye | As Samrat Shergill | |
| 2009 | Laughter Ke Phatke | Guest (as Himself) | |
| 2010 | Zara Nachke Dikha | Host | |
| 2010 | Meethi Choori No 1 | Host | |
| 2012–2013 | Mujhse kuchh kehti...Yeh Khamoshiyaan | Siddharth Kapoor | |
| 2013–2014 | Qubool Hai | Haider Sheikh | |
| 2013 | Doli Armaano Ki | Guest (as Himself) | |
| 2015–2016 | Sarojini - Ek Nayi Pehal | Somendra Singh/Munna Singh | |
| 2015 | Jhalak Dikhhla Jaa 8 | Guest (as Himself) | |
| 2017 | Nach Baliye 8 | Contestant (2nd Runner-up) | |
| 2017 | Love Ka Hai Intezaar | Ayaan Mehta | |
| 2017 | Mirchi Top 20 17 | Guest (as Himself) | |
| 2017 | A Table for Two | Guest (as Himself) | |
| 2019 | Kitchen Champion 5 | Guest (as Himself) | |
| 2019 | Nach Baliye 9 | Guest (as Himself) | |
| 2020–2021 | Naagin 5 | Jay Mathur | |

== Awards and nominations ==
- 2014 Asian Viewers Televisions Awards for Best Supporting Actor for Qubool Hai as Haider Sheikh
