= Ragini MMS: Returns =

Alt Balaji Erotic-Horror Series

- Genre: Horror
- Written by: Kamayani Vyas; Nikhil व्यसुग
- Directed by: Suyash Vadhavkar
- Starring: Sunny Leone; Karishma Sharma; Riya Sen; Nishant Singh Malkani; Siddharth Gupta; Navdeep; Divya Agarwal; Varun Sood; Navneet Kaur
- Country of origin: India
- Original language: Hindi
- No. of seasons: 2
- No. of episodes: 27 (list of episodes)

Production
- Producers: Ekta Kapoor; Shobha Kapoor
- Cinematography: Anubhav Bansal
- Editors: Nitin FCP; Prashant Panda
- Running time: 18-24 minutes
- Production company: ALTBalaji

Original release
- Release: 19 October 2017 – 29 December 2019

Ragini MMS: Returns is an Indian found footage erotic horror web series produced under ALTBalaji. The series is the third installment of Ragini MMS Franchise.

The first season starred Karishma Sharma, Riya Sen, Siddharth Gupta, and Nishant Singh Malkani. It premiered on ALTBalaji and ZEE5 on 19 October 2017.

The second season stars Sunny Leone, Divya Agarwal, Varun Sood, Navdeep, and Navneet Kaur in the leading roles. This season was released on 18 December 2019.

The series is directed by Suyash Vadhavkar and Shahriyar Afsan Ovro and produced by Ekta Kapoor and Shobha Kapoor.

== Plot ==
Season 1

The story revolves around the life of Simran (Riya Sen), and Ragini (Karishma Sharma). The uncanny haunting that they witness at an old deserted college is at the heart of this story. Running behind the scandalous MMS CD, which has thrilling mysteries and dark secrets to unwind, is what awaits the two in search to fight the freakish energy that surrounds them.

Season 2

Meena (Sunny Leone), a paranormal investigator, arrives in India from Canada. She visits the Victoria Villa that is said to have been haunted by the ghost of Captain Burns. Meena, along with her boyfriend, Rajeev (Navdeep), are killed by the ghost. Eleven years later, Ragini (Divya Agarwal) and her friends decide to celebrate their friend's Bachelorette party at Victoria Villa.

== Cast ==
Season 1

- Karishma Sharma as Ragini
- Siddharth Gupta as Rahul
- Riya Sen as Simran
- Nishant Singh Malkani as Raj
- Dilnaz Irani as Kavita
- Shreya Gupto as Zoya
- Katie Iqbal as Sonia Sehgal
- Harssh A. Singh as Principal Rajat Kapoor
- Raquib Arshad as Anshuman and Old woman
- A. R. Rama as Chowkidar Raju
- Deepak Kalra as Shakti
- Sakshi Pradhan as Simon
- Rakshanda Khan as Bharati Varma
- Priyanka Bora as Aarti

Season 2

- Divya Agarwal as Ragini
- Varun Sood as Rahul
- Navneet Kaur as Kirti
- Sunny Leone as Meena
- Navdeep as Rajeev
- Thea Dsouza as Random Ranbu
- Aarti Khetarpal as Kamna
- Mohit Duseja as Virgin Mohite
- Rakshanda Khan as Bharti Verma
- Antara Banerjee as Kasturi
- Hiten Paintal as Veer Pratap Singh
- Sneha Namanandi as Varsha
- Rishika Nag as Aradhana
- Sakshi Gupta as Sunny
- Gaurav Alugh as Harshit
- Kunal Thakur
- Vikram Rathod

Guest

- Sunny Leone Special appearance in the song "Hello Ji!" and First Episode of Season 2

== Episodes ==
Series	Episodes	Originally released
1	12	19 October 2017
2	15	18 December 2019

=== Season 1 ===
No. overall	No. in season	Title	Directed by	Written by	Original release date
1	1	"Sex Shaadi MMS"	Suyash Vadhavkar and Shahriyar Afsan Ovro	Kamayani Vyas and Nikhil Vyas	19 October 2017
2	2	"Bikini Special"	Suyash Vadhavkar and Shahriyar Afsan Ovro	Kamayani Vyas and Nikhil Vyas	19 October 2017
3	3	"Sex Can Kill!!"	Suyash Vadhavkar and Shahriyar Afsan Ovro	Kamayani Vyas and Nikhil Vyas	19 October 2017
4	4	"Slutagini@MMS"	Suyash Vadhavkar and Shahriyar Afsan Ovro	Kamayani Vyas and Nikhil Vyas	19 October 2017
5	5	"Sex Lies Aur CD"	Suyash Vadhavkar and Shahriyar Afsan Ovro	Kamayani Vyas and Nikhil Vyas	19 October 2017
6	6	"Sab (Para)Normal Hai"	Suyash Vadhavkar and Shahriyar Afsan Ovro	Kamayani Vyas and Nikhil Vyas	19 October 2017
7	7	"Its Not Over Yet!"	Suyash Vadhavkar and Shahriyar Afsan Ovro	Kamayani Vyas and Nikhil Vyas	3 January 2018
8	8	"Murderer In MMS"	Suyash Vadhavkar and Shahriyar Afsan Ovro	Kamayani Vyas and Nikhil Vyas	3 January 2018
9	9	"After-Party Sex Stories"	Suyash Vadhavkar and Shahriyar Afsan Ovro	Kamayani Vyas and Nikhil Vyas	3 January 2018
10	10	"Who's That Girl?!"	Suyash Vadhavkar and Shahriyar Afsan Ovro	Kamayani Vyas and Nikhil Vyas	3 January 2018
11	11	"Trapped In The Haunted House"	Suyash Vadhavkar and Shahriyar Afsan Ovro	Kamayani Vyas and Nikhil Vyas	3 January 2018
12	12	"Climax Mein Climax"	Suyash Vadhavkar and Shahriyar Afsan Ovro	Kamayani Vyas and Nikhil Vyas	3 January 2018

=== Season 2 ===
No. overall	No. in season	Title	Directed by	Written by	Original release date
13	1	"Kyunki Do Mein Zyaada Maza Hai"	Suyash Vadhavkar and Shahriyar Afsan Ovro	Kamayani Vyas and Nikhil Vyas	18 December 2019
14	2	"Girls Trip, Girls Strip"	Suyash Vadhavkar and Shahriyar Afsan Ovro	Kamayani Vyas and Nikhil Vyas	18 December 2019
15	3	"Maza ya Saza"	Suyash Vadhavkar and Shahriyar Afsan Ovro	Kamayani Vyas and Nikhil Vyas	18 December 2019
16	4	"Sex, Lies aur Bhootiyapa"	Suyash Vadhavkar and Shahriyar Afsan Ovro	Kamayani Vyas and Nikhil Vyas	18 December 2019
17	5	"Karoge Toh Maroge"	Suyash Vadhavkar and Shahriyar Afsan Ovro	Kamayani Vyas and Nikhil Vyas	18 December 2019
18	6	"Not a ‘Good’ Bye"	Suyash Vadhavkar and Shahriyar Afsan Ovro	Kamayani Vyas and Nikhil Vyas	19 December 2019
19	7	"Lekin Ye Kahani Hai Kiski?!?!"	Suyash Vadhavkar and Shahriyar Afsan Ovro	Kamayani Vyas and Nikhil Vyas	19 December 2019
20	8	"Cruel Intentions"	Suyash Vadhavkar and Shahriyar Afsan Ovro	Kamayani Vyas and Nikhil Vyas	19 December 2019
21	9	"You Can Run But You Can't Hide"	Suyash Vadhavkar and Shahriyar Afsan Ovro	Kamayani Vyas and Nikhil Vyas	19 December 2019
22	10	"Ragini ka MMS Dekha Kya"	Suyash Vadhavkar and Shahriyar Afsan Ovro	Kamayani Vyas and Nikhil Vyas	19 December 2019
23	11	"Behak Jaoge Toh Marr Jaoge"	Suyash Vadhavkar and Shahriyar Afsan Ovro	Kamayani Vyas and Nikhil Vyas	20 December 2019
24	12	"You Can't Escape Your Past"	Suyash Vadhavkar and Shahriyar Afsan Ovro	Kamayani Vyas and Nikhil Vyas	20 December 2019
25	13	"Creeps Beware! She Is Out to Kill"	Suyash Vadhavkar and Shahriyar Afsan Ovro	Kamayani Vyas and Nikhil Vyas	20 December 2019
26	14	"Trapped and Hunted"	Suyash Vadhavkar and Shahriyar Afsan Ovro	Kamayani Vyas and Nikhil Vyas	20 December 2019
27	15	"Love Is Love"	Suyash Vadhavkar and Shahriyar Afsan Ovro	Kamayani Vyas and Nikhil Vyas	20 December 2019

== Soundtrack ==
No.	Title	Singer(s)	Length
1.	"Hello Ji"	Kanika Kapoor

== Season 2 ==
A sequel to the first season, Ragini MMS Returns 2, was released on ALTBalaji and ZEE5 app in 2019.
