= Ufff..Yeh Love Hai Mushkil =

- Genre: Comedy-drama
- Screenplay by: Gaurav Sharma; Sameer Garud; Mrinal Tripathi
- Story by: Sonali Jaffar; Shabia Walia; Malvika Asthana
- Directed by: Uttam Ahlawat; Ranjan Kumar Singh
- Starring: See below
- Theme music composer: Nakash Aziz; Sargam Jassu
- Opening theme: Ufff..Yeh Love Hai Mushkil
- Country of origin: India
- Original language: Hindi
- No. of seasons: 1
- No. of episodes: 102

Production
- Producers: Sonali Jaffar; Aamir Jaffar
- Cinematography: Hrishikesh Gandhi; Manisha Sharma
- Editors: Dharmesh Patel; Shakti Mohanty
- Camera setup: Multi-camera
- Running time: 20-25 minutes
- Production companies: Full House Films, LLP

Original release
- Network: Sony SAB
- Release: 9 June – 4 October 2025

Ufff..Yeh Love Hai Mushkil (transl. Ugh... This Love Is Difficult) is an Indian Hindi-language comedy-drama television series that aired from 9 June 2025 to 4 October 2025 on Sony SAB and digitally on SonyLIV. It is produced by Aamir Jaffar and Sonali Jaffar under Full House Media Films, starring Shabbir Ahluwalia and Ashi Singh.

== Plot ==
Yug Sinha, a sharp yet emotionally distant lawyer, has lost faith in love following a painful betrayal. His life changes when he meets Kairi Sharma, a spirited young woman who works multiple jobs while raising her three younger siblings — Biscuit, Imarti, and Gujiya.

Yug and Kairi initially clash because of their opposing outlooks: he is practical and guarded, while she is hopeful and guided by her heart. Their frequent encounters at home and in the courtroom lead to emotional confrontations and comic misunderstandings.

Despite their differences, they gradually develop a deeper bond as they confront their pasts and support their families through personal and legal struggles. Their relationship becomes increasingly complicated with the return of Lata, Yug's mysterious ex-wife, whose arrival revives unresolved emotions and reveals hidden motives.

== Cast ==
=== Main ===
- Shabir Ahluwalia as Advocate Yug Sinha – Shaurya, Shlok and Samay's brother; Lata's ex-husband; Kairi's husband.
- Ashi Singh as Kairi Sharma Sinha – Mairi's younger daughter; Kundan's step-daughter; Lata's sister; Biscuit, Imarti, and Gujiya's half-sister; Yug's second wife.

=== Recurring ===
- Abhishek Verma as Shaurya Sinha – Yug, Shlok and Samay's brother; Anya's fiancé.
- Devish Ahuja as Shlok Sinha – Yug, Shaurya and Samay's brother
- Vansh Sayani as Samay Sinha – Yug, Shaurya and Shlok's youngest brother
- Supriya Shukla as Indrani "Mairi" Jha – Lata and Kairi's mother
- Mohammed Saud Mansuri as Biscuit Sharma – Kundan's son; Imarti and Gujiya's brother; Kairi's half-brother.
- Deepal Satija as Imarti Sharma – Kundan's daughter; Biscuit and Gujiya's sister; Kairi's half-sister.
- Bhoomi Ramola as Gujiya Sharma – Kundan's daughter; Imarti and Biscuit's sister; Kairi's half-sister.
- Ridhima Pandit as Snehlata "Lata" Jha – Indrani's elder daughter; Kairi's sister; Yug's ex-wife.
- Rahul Singh as Tarazu – The loyal and quirky house servant in the Sinha household.
- Priyamvada Singh as Shalini - Anya’s mother.
- Mousumi Debnath as Anya – Shalini's daughter; Shaurya's fiance.
- Melissa Pais as Sheela - Kairi’s friend.
- Rajat Dahiya as Vikram Malhotra – Yug's professional rival and legal adversary.
- Madhvendra Jha as Kundan Sharma – Biscuit, Imarti, and Gujiya's biological father; Kairi's step-father.
- Arsh Aneja as Lucky (2025)
- Tushar Dhembla as Jay Khanna - Kairi’s one-sided-lover. (2025)
- Simmi Dixit as Inspector Rajni Trivedi. (2025)
- Manav Jalan as Match Maker. (2025)

== Production ==
=== Filming ===
The series uses AI to depict younger avatars of characters for backstory and narrative depth. AI is used to de-age the character of Yug Sinha for flashback sequences. Instead of using a different actor to play the younger version, AI technology is employed to digitally alter lead actor Shabir Ahluwalia's appearance, making him look younger.

=== Music ===
The title track of Ufff... Yeh Love Hai Mushkil is sung by Nakash Aziz, Sargam Jassu, and Reetesh Badr, and was released on 9 June 2025 by Sony SAB. The song runs for approximately 2 minutes and 45 seconds. It is composed by Nakash Aziz and Sargam Jassu, with lyrics written by Reetesh Badr.
