= Zara Nachke Dikha =

Indian dance reality show

- Also known as: The Battle of Sexes
- Presented by: Karan Singh Grover and Shweta Gulati (season 1); Mohit Sehgal and Sanaya Irani (season 2); Mantra and Jennifer Winget (season 2)
- Judges: Malaika Arora Khan; Chunkey Pandey (season 1); Shilpa Shetty Kundra; Arshad Warsi; Vaibhavi Merchant (season 2)
- Country of origin: India
- No. of seasons: 2

Production
- Production company: SOL Productions

Original release
- Network: STAR One (season 1); STAR Plus (season 2)
- Release: 14 July 2008 – 10 July 2010

Zara Nachke Dikha (transl. Show Me Your Dance) is an Indian dance reality show. It originally aired on STAR One, but then aired on STAR Plus. The series debuted on 14 July 2008 and was hosted by Karan Singh Grover and Shweta Gulati. All the contestants have a film or television background. The next season aired two years later on 1 May 2010 in India and the United States. Consequent episodes are aired Saturday and Sunday evenings.

The show features a variety of Indian cultural and international dance styles ranging across a broad spectrum of classical, contemporary, Bollywood, hip-hop, breakdancing, jazz, Kalaripayattu, salsa, samba and musical theatre styles, amongst others, with many subgenres within these categories represented apart from these dance styles the contestants have performed various extremely dangerous acts such as playing with fire, burning themselves, dance with fire, dancing in the water, breaking glasses with their bodies, etc. and have performed really difficult dance styles such as shadow dance, krumping, ballet, tap dancing, belly dance, etc. Competitors attempt to master these styles in an attempt to survive successive weeks of elimination and win a cash prize (typically Rs 50 Lakh) and often other awards. The show is judged by some of the most popular Indian choreographers and actors, such as Malaika Arora Khan and Chunkey Pandey in the first season and Shilpa Shetty Kundra, Arshad Warsi and Vaibhavi Merchant in the second season.

== Concept ==
The program is a reality dance competition show.

=== Season 1 ===
The theme of the show is 'The Battle of the Sexes', wherein two teams, the Tez Talwar boys and the Meethi Churi girls compete in a dance competition. Every weekend, there are five rounds, in which the contestants dance it out either solo or in groups. Depending on their performance, they receive points from the two judges. The team with the highest points at the end of a week's wins and gives a dance form to another team and they have to perform the dance form in the khallas round and impress the judges and if the judges are not impressed they are sent to a penalty chair where they cannot perform until their team wins and bring them back. They even have 3 lifelines to bring their contestants back if after one week is over of theirs on penalty bench.

=== Season 2 ===
The theme of the show is 'The Battle of the Sexes', wherein two teams, the Mast Kalandar boys and the Massakali girls compete in a dance competition. Unlike the first season this season has eliminations. Every weekend, there are five rounds, in which the contestants dance it out either solo or in groups. Depending on their performance, they receive points from the three judges. The team with the highest points at the end of a week's episodes gets to nominate one contestant from their opponents' team for elimination. This contestant gets an opportunity to save him/her self from elimination in the next episode by impressing the judges with their performance.

== Series overview ==
Series	Episodes	Originally released	
Series	Episodes	First released	Last released
1	16	14 July 2008	28 September 2008
2	22	1 May 2010	14 July 2010

== Judges & Hosts ==
=== Judges ===
Season 1

- Malaika Arora Khan
- Chunkey Pandey

Season 2

- Shilpa Shetty Kundra
- Arshad Warsi
- Vaibhavi Merchant

=== Hosts ===
Season 1

- Karan Singh Grover / Shweta Gulati

Season 2

- Mohit Sehgal / Sanaya Irani - hosts for two episodes.
- RJ Mantra / Jennifer Winget - hosts.

== Season 1 of Zara Nachke Dikha ==
Meethi Churi Ladkiya (Girls Team) Winners

- Yogesh Patkar ( Dance Choreographer)
- Ramya Patkar ( Assistant Choreographer)
- Delnaaz Paul (Captain)
- Manini De/Ashita Dhawan
- Mouni Roy
- Karishma Tanna
- Jennifer Winget
- Rupali Ganguly
- Swini Khara
- Narayani Shastri

Tez Talwaar Ladke (Boys team)

- Ali Asghar (Captain)
- Bakhtiyaar Irani
- Vikas Sethi
- Amey Pandya
- Amit Tandon
- Chaitanya Choudhury
- Manish Goel

== Season 2 of Zara Nachke Dikha ==
Massakali Girls (Girls Team) Winners

- Sangeeta Ghosh (Captain)
- Additi Gupta
- Sparsh Khanchandani
- Mukti Mohan
- Kritika Kamra
- Rakhi Sawant
- Hazel Crowney
- Rashami Desai
- Sanjeeda Sheikh
- Sapna Suryawanshi

Mast Kalandar Boys (Boys Team)

- Aamir Ali (Captain)
- Angad Hasija (Eliminated)
- Kapil Nirmal (Eliminated)
- Ayush Mahesh Khedekar
- Siddhesh Pai
- Akshat Saluja
- Abhishek Avasthi
- Karan Kundra
- Sushant Singh Rajput

== Game ==
Indiagames has released a dance video game based on the show for mobile devices.
