= Vighnaharta Ganesha =

- Genre: Mythological drama
- Written by: Vaibhav Mutha; Paresh Shah; Deepak S.V.; Himanshu Tyagi
- Directed by: Abhimanyu Singh; Brij Mohan Pandey; Anjalika Gupta
- Starring: Aryan Bawankar; Madirakshi Mundle; Uzair Basar; Akanksha Puri; Malkhan Singh; Basant Bhatt; Preetika Chauhan
- Country of origin: India
- Original language: Hindi
- No. of episodes: 1026

Production
- Producer: Abhimanyu Singh
- Cinematography: Abhimanyu Singh
- Camera setup: Multi-camera Motion Capture Camera Technology
- Running time: 20–22 minutes

Original release
- Network: Sony Entertainment Television
- Release: August 22, 2017 – November 12, 2021

Vighnaharta Ganesha (transl. Ganesha, the remover of obstacles) is an Indian mythological television series based on the stories of Lord Ganesha. The series aired on Sony Entertainment Television from 22 August 2017 to 12 November 2021. It depicted the various legends of Lord Ganesha along with stories of other Hindu deities. This is one of the longest-running Hindu mythological serials on Indian Television.

== Plot ==
The show narrates mythological tales of Lord Ganesha, beginning with his creation by Goddess Parvati. In one of the key arcs, Lord Shiva, unaware that Ganesha is his son, beheads him during a confrontation. Upon Parvati’s request, Shiva resurrects him with the head of an elephant, after which he is named Vighnaharta (the remover of obstacles). The series later expands to depict various stories of gods, goddesses, sages, demons, and avatars from Hindu scriptures.

== Cast ==
=== Main cast ===
- Uzair Basar / Nishkarsh Dixit / Aryan Bawankar as Ganesh (2017–2018) / (2018–2020) / (2020–2021)
- Akanksha Puri / Madirakshi Mundle as Parvati (2017–2020) / (2020–2021)
- Malkhan Singh as Shiva (2017–2021)
- Basant Bhatt as Kartikeya (2017–2019) ; (2020–2021)
  - Pratham Kunwar as Kartikeya (2019)
- Rahul Sharma / Kuldeep Singh / Hitanshu Jinsi as Vishnu (2017) / (2017–2020) / (2020–2021)
- Anshu Malik / Deblina Chatterjee / Riney Aryaa as Lakshmi (2017–2020) / (2020–2021) / (2021)
- Digvijay Purohit as Brahma (2017–2021)
- Preetika Chauhan / Bhawna Kanwar Hada as Saraswati (2017–2018) / (2018–2021)
- Saachi Tiwari as Riddhi (2021)
- Ketaki Kulkarni as Siddhi (2021)
- Sunidee Chauhan as Devasena (2020–2021)
- Pal John as Valli (2020–2021)

=== Recurring cast ===
- Anand Goradia as Narada Muni (2017–2021)
- Meer Ali as Indra Dev (2017–2021)
- Viren Singh Rathor / Suraj Sonik as Surya Dev (2017–2021) / (2021)
- Anshul Bammi as Chandra Dev (2017–2018) ; (2019–2021)
  - Pradeep Singh Rajput as Chandra Dev (2018)
- Vikas Salgotra / Rohit Chaudhary as Vayu Dev (2017–2021) / (2021)
- Tushar Chawla / Harjinder Singh as Varun Dev (2017–2021) / (2021)
- Lala Tiger as Agni Dev (2017–2021)
- Sonia Sharma as Devi Sachi (2017–2021)
- Richa Dixit / Aishwarya Raj Bhakuni as Devi Sangya (2017) / (2017–2021)
- Riyanka Chanda as Devi Rohini (2017–2021)
- Ashutosh Tiwari as Nandi (2017–2021)
- Mukesh Tripathi as Shringi (2017–2020)
- Bharat Bhatia as Kubera Dev (2017–2018) ; (2019–2020)
  - Kaivalya Chheda as Kubera Dev (2018–2019)
- Sonia Singh in dual roles
  - Vrindha (2018)
  - Devi Aditi (2020)
- Sonu Mishra as Veer Mahendra
- Nirbhay Wadhwa in dual roles
  - Mahishasur (2018) ; (2021)
  - Hanuman (2019) ; (2021)

=== Supporting and guest roles ===
- Ishita Ganguly as Devi Manasa (2020–2021)
- Piyali Munshi as Devi Ahalya (2020)
- Manisha Rawat as Devi Vaishnavi (2021)
- Tharun Khanna as Tulsidas (2021)
- Tushar Dalvi as Maharaj Himavan (2017–2018)
- Naina Gupta / Akanksha Saini as Maharani Mainavati (2017) / (2018–2020)
- Palguni Sharma as Devi Ashoka Sundari (2020–2021)
- Chandralekha Mukheerjee as Devi Jyoti (2020–2021)
- Meet Mukhi as Subhodh (2018)
- Rajesh Kher as Mushikasura (2017)
- Ketan Karande in dual roles
  - Shumbh (2018) ; (2020)
  - Nishumbh (2018) ; (2020)
- Gajendra Chauhan as Dhambhasura (2018)
- Vineet Kakkar as Andhakasura (2018)
- Ankur Nayyar as Parshuram (2017) ; (2019–2020)
- Haelyn Shastri as Devi Priya (2019)
- Payal Gupta as Maharani Sarala (2019)
- Avtar Vaishnani as Jayanth (2020)
- Garima Joshi as Sundaravalli (2020)
- Chirag Jani in dual roles
  - Sindhura (2017)
  - Surapadhma (2020–2021)
- Sreoshi Chatterjee as Ajamukhi (2020–2021)
- Amar Maurya as Simukhasura (2020–2021)
- Manish Uppal as Narakasura (2020–2021)
