= Koi Aap Sa =

2005 Indian romance film by Partho Mitra

- Film poster
- Directed by: Partho Mitra
- Screenplay by: Dheeraj Sarna; Mahesh Pandey
- Produced by: Shobha Kapoor; Ekta Kapoor
- Starring: Aftab Shivdasani; Anita Hassanandani; Dipannita Sharma
- Cinematography: Deepak Malwankar
- Edited by: Salil Malik
- Music by: Himesh Reshammiya
- Production company: Balaji Motion Pictures
- Release date: 14 October 2005 (India)
- Country: India
- Language: Hindi

Koi Aap Sa is a 2005 Indian Hindi romance film directed by Partho Mitra. It stars Aftab Shivdasani, Dipannita Sharma and Anita Hassanandani in pivotal roles. It was released on 14 October 2005.

== Plot ==
Rohan and Simi are childhood friends. Rohan likes a girl from college named Preeti, and Simi helps bring Rohan and Preeti closer. However, Preeti feels awkward, insecure, and jealous because she feels Rohan and Simi's friendship is getting in the way. At this point, Simi's fiancé Vicky enters with his good friend Ranjit. Preeti comes to find out that Vicky is Simi's fiancé and that their engagement party is to be held tomorrow. At the engagement party, Simi dances with Vicky, and Rohan dances with Preeti. After the engagement party, Vicky flies out on a business trip, while Rohan, Simi, and Preeti attend a party. At the party, whilst Rohan and Preeti are dancing, Ranjit visits Simi; he says he was on the way to the airport but wanted to give Simi a gift before he left, as her family looked after him very well during his trip in India. Ranjit says he left the gift in the cab and persuaded Simi to follow him to the cab to get the gift. However, before they could reach the cab, Ranjit pushes Simi into a spare room and brutally rapes her. Simi calls out Rohan's name, but by the time Rohan comes, it's too late. Rohan chases the cab that Ranjit is in, but Ranjit's cab meets with an accident, and Ranjit dies. Simi doesn't tell Vicky and wants to wait to tell him in person. While on the way to pick Vicky from the airport, Simi is on the phone with Rohan when she has an accident. At the hospital, the doctor tells Rohan that Simi is pregnant and abortion shouldn't be considered as it is very risky, which Vicky overhears. No one believes Simi when she tells them that Ranjit raped her; Simi's parents and Vicky blame Rohan, and Vicky calls off the engagement and leaves. Rohan decides to accept Simi and the baby and proposes to her to save her from humiliation; they get engaged. Just as the wedding is approaching and Simi is heavily pregnant, Vicky returns. He realizes he was wrong and asks for a second chance; Simi agrees. Rohan pretends to be happy for Simi, but he's really heartbroken, as he truly loves Simi. At Rohan's football match, Simi explains to Vicky that they're only pretending to be a couple so that Rohan and Preeti can get back together. Preeti enters and tells Simi that Rohan loves Simi and only Simi. At this point, Simi gets labour pains, and everyone rushes her to the hospital. Simi gives birth to a baby girl, and when the nurse asks who the father is, she says Rohan's name. After this, both Simi and Rohan are together.

== Cast ==
- Aftab Shivdasani as Rohan Badola
- Anita Hassanandani as Simran "Simi" Ghosh (as Natassha Hassanandani)
- Dipannita Sharma as Preeti Chauhan
- Himanshu Malik as Vicky Kasliwal
- Advait Vaidya as Samir ‘Sam’ Ali
- Pushy Anand as Vicky's mom
- Shama Deshpande as Sumati
- Rajendra Gupta as Mahesh Gupta
- Manoj Joshi as Pratap Rehan
- Gautam Kapoor as Ranjeet Das
- Sushmita Mukherjee as Dolly
- Anil Nagrath as Vicky's dad
- Himani Shivpuri as Mrs. Neha Bakshi
- Pushtiie Shakti as Pinky
- Ali Asgar as Football match commentator
- Zabyn Khan (item number in Aadat Ho Chuki Song)

== Soundtrack ==
Koi Aap Sa

Soundtrack album by Himesh Reshammiya
- Released: 10 September 2005
- Recorded: 2005
- Venue: Mumbai
- Genre: Feature film soundtrack
- Language: Hindi
- Producer: Himesh Reshammiya

Himesh Reshammiya chronology
Aashiq Banaya Aapne (2005)	Koi Aap Sa (2005)	Kyon Ki (2005)

All music is composed by Himesh Reshammiya; lyrics are by Sameer.

#	Title	Singer(s)
1	"Seene Mein Dil"	Udit Narayan, Alka Yagnik
2	"Aadat Ho Chuki"	Shaan, Sunidhi Chauhan, Jayesh Gandhi
3	"Baandh Mere Pairon Mein"	Sonu Nigam, Sunidhi Chauhan
4	"Tere Dil Ka Rishta"	Sonu Nigam
5	"Koi Aap Sa"	Sonu Nigam, Alka Yagnik
6	"Kabhi Na Sukoon Aaya"	Udit Narayan, Alka Yagnik
7	"Kabhi Na Sukoon Aaya" (Sad)	Udit Narayan, Alka Yagnik
8	"Seene Mein Dil" (Female)	Alka Yagnik

== Reception ==
Taran Adarsh of IndiaFM gave the film 1 out of 5, writing ″After making an impact in SILSIILAY earlier this year, Natassha gets an author-backed role in KOI AAP SA and must say, the actor is only getting better, more dependable. A sincere performance, it stands out mainly because Natassha handles it most naturally. Dipannita Sharma doesn't get much scope, she is wasted. Himanshu Malik fails to deliver. Gautam Kapoor also gets minimal scope. Rajendra Gupta and Shama Deshpande are effective. The Manoj Joshi-Sushmita Mukherjee comedy track fails to evoke mirth. Actually, it looks completely forced in the narrative! On the whole, KOI AAP SA has an interesting story to tell, but the screenplay doesn't do justice to the plot. At the box-office, releasing the film in the Ramzan period will affect its business largely. Disappointing.″ Vipin Vijayan of Rediff.com wrote ″One good aspect of the film is the music. Good job Himesh Reshammiya! Aftab and Natassha come up with average performances, while Dipannita is wasted. Her role is limited to expressions of disgust and frustration. On a whole, I would rate the film poorly, but for its score. If you're going for the movie, don't forget the aspirin.
