= Navina Bole =

Indian television actress

- Occupations: Actress, Model
- Spouse: Karran Jeet (m. 2017; div. 2024)
- Children: 1

Navina Bole is an Indian television actress. She is known for playing the role of Diya Bhushan in Miley Jab Hum Tum (2008), Priya in Jeannie Aur Juju (2014) and Tia in Ishqbaaaz (2016).

== Early life and education ==
Navina Bole was born in Mumbai. She received a degree in commerce and trained as a Bharat Natyam dancer.

== Career ==
She started her career with modeling before appearing in television commercials for brands including Fair & Lovely, Dabur Vatika, Fair one, Chevrolet, Reliance, and Nokia. She has also done music videos for Jagjit Singh, Ghulam Ali, Abida Parveen, Amaan & Ayaan Ali Bangash, DJ Jayanta Pathak & DJ Taral.

== Personal life ==
Navina Bole dated actor-producer Karran Jeet and became engaged to him on 22 January 2017. They married in March 2017.

== Television ==
Year	Serial	Role	Notes
1998	C.I.D.	Various characters	
2001	Ssshhhh...Phir Koi Hai	Koena	
2006	Solhah Singaarr		
2007	Sapna Babul Ka...Bidaai	Dolly Rashvanjsh	
2008	Bhaago KK Aaya		
2008	Miley Jab Hum Tum	Diya Bhushan	
2009	Yahaaan Main Ghar Ghar Kheli	Karishma	
2009	Sajan Re Jhoot Mat Bolo	Sonia	
2010	Adaalat	Various characters	
2010	Ram Milaayi Jodi		
2011	Love U Zindagi	Manju	
2011	Surya The Super Cop		
2011	Hi! Padosi... Kaun Hai Doshi?		
2011	Mrs. Kaushik Ki Paanch Bahuein	Pushpa Dwivedi	
2011	Piya Ka Ghar Pyaara Lage	Vibha Rokre	
2012	Savdhaan India	Madhubala / Ritu	
2012	Na Bole Tum... Na Maine Kuch Kaha	Koyal	
2012	Shobha Somnath Ki	Kausar Jahan	
2012	Teri Meri Love Stories	Sonia	
2012	Kya Huaa Tera Vaada		
2012–2014	Jeannie Aur Juju	Priya	
2014	Kumkum Bhagya	Meetu	
2012	Baal Veer	Katelli and Nokilli	
2013	Yeh Hai Mohabbatein	Dimple	
2014	Yam Hain Hum	Meneka	
2014	Badi Door Se Aaye Hai	Nisha	
2015	Fear Files	Episode 32 as Yakshini (Ghost)	
2015	The Great Indian Family Drama	Various characters	
2015	Sumit Sambhal Lega	Natasha	
2015	Boyz	Ms. Chatterjee	
2016	Ishqbaaaz	Tia	
2017-2020	Taarak Mehta Ka Ooltah Chashmah	Dr. Monica / Dr. Sara	
2022	Ali Baba	Afrasiya	
2022-2023	Parshuram	Devi Renuka	
2023	Tere Ishq Mein Ghayal	Anita	
