= Sarojini – Ek Nayi Pehal =

Indian television series

- Also known as: Sarojini
- Genre: Drama; Romance
- Created by: Rashmi Sharma Telefilms Limited
- Starring: Shiny Doshi; Mohit Sehgal; Aamir Ali Malik; Pankaj Tripathi; Ketki Kadam
- Country of origin: India
- Original language: Hindi
- No. of seasons: 1
- No. of episodes: 246

Production
- Producer: Rashmi Sharma
- Production locations: Bihar; Uttar Pradesh
- Camera setup: Multi-camera
- Running time: Approx. 24 minutes
- Production company: Rashmi Sharma Telefilms

Original release
- Network: Zee TV
- Release: 20 July 2015 – 30 April 2016

Sarojini – Ek Nayi Pehal (International Title: Sarojini) is an Indian television drama series, which premiered on 20 July 2015. The show was produced by Rashmi Sharma Telefilms. Starring Shiny Doshi, Mohit Sehgal and Pankaj Tripathi in lead roles. Later Aamir Ali replaced Mohit Sehgal as his character was dead in the last few episodes . It aired Monday through Saturday on Zee TV. The show ended happily on 30 April 2016 with Sarojini and Rishabh's marriage with a family picture taken.

== Plot ==
The show followed the journey of Sarojini, a strong-minded, well-educated girl who gets married into a family with a regressive patriarchal set up - a household governed, dominated and practically ruled by her overbearing, chauvinistic father-in-law.

== Cast ==
=== Main cast ===
- Shiny Doshi as Sarojini Somendra Singh
- Mohit Sehgal as Somendra Dushyant Singh / Munna Singh
- Aamir Ali as Rishabh (2nd Male Lead)
- Pankaj Tripathi as Dushyant Singh (Antagonist)
- Ketaki Kadam as Indira Dushyant Singh

=== Supporting cast ===
- Purva Parag as Nirjhara Dushyant Singh
- Nitin Goswami as Bhaskar Dushyant Singh
- Salina Prakash as Sapna Bhaskar Singh
- Rakesh Pandey as Gajanan Singh
- Minakshi Verma as Arundhati Gajanan Singh
- Aanchal Khurana as Maneesha / Mannu
- Ram Awana as Sangram Singh Mannu's Father
- Alka Kaushal as Tharkeshwari Singh (Antagonist)
- Soni Singh as Sangeeta / Bijili
- Manoj Chandila as Komal Singh (Antagonist)
- Sushil Bonthiyaal as Keshav
- Mayank Gandhi as Indira's husband
- Paaras Madaan as Mayank singh

== Controversy ==
The show got into a controversy in March 2016, when the makers decided to do a big leap where Somendra gets killed. It became an issue when they did not tell Mohit Sehgal that he is off the show which made his fans a bit angry.

== Awards ==
| Year | Award | Category | Nominee | Result |
|---|---|---|---|---|
| 2015 | Zee Rishtey Awards | Favourite Bahu | Shiny Doshi | Won |
| 2015 | Zee Rishtey Awards | Favourite Nayi Jodi | Mohit Sehgal & Shiny Doshi | Nominated |
| 2015 | Zee Rishtey Awards | Favourite Dulhara Dushman | Aanchal Khurana | Nominated |
| 2015 | Zee Rishtey Awards | Favourite Dushmani/ Dard Bhara Rishta | Pankaj Tripathi | Nominated |
| 2015 | Zee Rishtey Awards | Favourite Sautan | Aanchal Khurana | Nominated |
| 2015 | Zee Rishtey Awards | Favourite Bhai | Mohit Sehgal | Nominated |
| 2015 | Zee Rishtey Awards | Favourite Buzurg | Rakesh Pandey | Nominated |
| 2015 | Zee Rishtey Awards | Favourite Naya Sadasya - Male | Mohit Sehgal | Nominated |
