= Tere Liye (TV series) =

Indian Hindi-language television romance series by Ekta Kapoor

- Created by: Ekta Kapoor
- Written by: Dialogues; Shirish Latkar
- Screenplay by: R M Joshi; Anil Nagpal; Gitangshu Dey
- Story by: R M Joshi; Anil Nagpal; Gitangshu Dey
- Directed by: Santram Varma; Mujammil Desai
- Starring: Anupriya Kapoor; Harshad Chopda; Shakti Arora; Neha Saxena; Rajat Tokas
- Opening theme: Tere Liye by Kailash Kher and Himani Kapoor
- Country of origin: India
- Original language: Hindi
- No. of episodes: 212

Production
- Producers: Shobha Kapoor; Ekta Kapoor
- Cinematography: Suhas Shirodkar; Rajan Singh; Mahesh Talkad
- Editors: Vikas Sharma; Vishal Sharma; Sandeep Bhatt
- Camera setup: Multi-camera
- Running time: 24 minutes
- Production company: Balaji Telefilms

Original release
- Network: Star Plus
- Release: 14 June 2010 – 2 April 2011

Tere Liye (transl. For You) is an Indian romantic television drama series that was aired from 14 June 2010 to 2 April 2011 on Star Plus. Produced by Ekta Kapoor and Shobha Kapoor under Balaji Telefilms, it starred Anupriya Kapoor and Harshad Chopda. The series ended abruptly due to issues between channel and production house.

== Plot ==
Teenagers Taani and Anurag study in the same school and are friends like their fathers Bimlendu and Shekhar. Suffering from cancer, Bimlendu is worried about Taani's future after his death. To reassure him, Shekhar gets Anurag married to Taani. It is a private ceremony, only attended by the parents.

They plan that a more public and official ceremony will take place once Taani and Anurag are older. Uncomfortable at first, she and Anurag slowly start feeling a special bond between them. But, owing to circumstances beyond their control, the teenaged couple is separated.

=== 8 years later ===
Taani is waiting for Anurag; her childhood crush has turned into deep love. Due to his long stay in the US for higher education, Anurag is now in love with the ambitious Nupur. Taani is heartbroken. Anurag vows to find her a suitable partner to replace him and selects his friend, Sushant. She retaliates with anger as she doesn't want to marry him.

Taani's dream of becoming a singer seems more achievable, as Sushant gives her contract for a music album. He begins falling for and proposes Taani, who only agrees as Anurag has vowed not to marry until she is well-settled. But, due to misunderstandings, Sushant leaves Taani, thinking she and Anurag are in love.

Nupur also leaves Anurag on the engagement day to accept an offer from a modelling agency. Taani sits in her place to save Anurag's honour. Their families are pleased, but he and Taani are left in a state of turmoil and confusion. Anurag confronts her about her relationship with Sushant, causing her to burst and reveal all that happened.

Anurag is upset. Taani comforts him saying that they'll have to keep up the charade of being engaged for some more time. Eventually, they'll reveal the truth. Through Taani's selfless sacrifices, Anurag realizes the love she has for him. Taani sees Anurag's brother-in-law Ritesh fiddling with his wife Ananya (Anurag's sister)'s medicines.

Ritesh's actions can harm Ananya; Taani tries to undo them. Ananya thinks that Taani is trying to hurt her. In a fit of rage, Shekhar calls Anurag a nobody living on his paternal name and wealth. He leaves the house that instant, followed by Taani and tells her that their pretence is over now. Laboni persuades Anurag to come home with her.

Anurag tries to get a job and become independent. Taani supports him. Anurag starts to see her in a different light fueled by the inherent love he has always had for her. He realises his feelings for Taani. Ananya instigates him against Taani. Anurag became very upset and broke off his relationship with Taani. Obviously, Anurag is not angry at Taani but feels he has been hurt by the person he loves the most, though he does not realise it. Anurag gets a business contract and completes the assignment without realizing Taani has quietly helped him behind the scenes. Eventually, he learns of her contribution to his success, which leaves him in a state of devastation. He is hit with a sense of reality that he is truly in love with Taani. On the other hand, Taani sets out for Mumbai to find Nupur and tell her to return to Anurag. Taani feels Anurag still loves Nupur. Taani reaches Nupur and tries to talk her into returning to Anurag. But Nupur is not impressed by Taani's arguments. Anurag overhears the whole conversation over the phone, and his love for Taani grows. Anurag now vows that he will bring Taani back. He admits to himself that it is Taani who he wants. He finds her and takes her home but does not confess his love, although she senses that something has changed within him.

One day, Anurag finally declares his feelings to Taani, and they embrace. But Nupur comes back at that moment and tries to reconcile with Anurag. He pushes Nupur away and follows Taani. Nupur feels very upset and slashes her wrist to kill herself. Taani convinces Anurag to save Nupur. But Nupur plans on re-entering Anurag's life as his lover. She tries everything possible to gain Anurag's love, but he only loves Taani. During a family function, Anurag announces his relationship with Taani in front of everyone. He then proposes to her again and says he is not marrying her because of their childhood marriage but for his love. Meanwhile, Anurag's younger brother Robindo proposes to Mauli, a neighbourhood girl with whom he is madly in love. Mauli loves Taani's brother Taposh. But Taposh has clearly told Mauli that he is not interested. So Mauli agrees to marry Robindo. Then, Taposh realizes that he is also in love with Mauli. He tells her so, but she rejects him and decides to stay with Robindo. However, Robindo suddenly learns that he has an illegitimate child through a past relationship with a girl in the US. When Mauli goes to Taani's house, she overhears a conversation about Robindo's child. Mauli is so angry that she breaks off her engagement with Robindo and marries Taposh. Heartbroken, Robindo decides to leave town. He blames all that happened on Taani and curses her that she and Anurag will be separated.

Ritesh is having an affair with a prostitute named Gulabo. Taani, who finds out about it, pays Gulabo to keep her mouth shut so that Ananya does not have to suffer. Meanwhile, Nupur gives Gulabo more money to reveal everything to Ananya and blame it on Taani. Nupur hopes that Anurag's family will blame Taani and kick her out of the house. Gulabo goes to Ananya, who is pregnant, and tells her everything. Realizing the truth, Ananya is devastated and walks out of the house, crying, onto the street, where she gets into an accident. Just before she dies, Ananya hands over her daughter, Kuhu, and new-born son to Taani. As a ploy to take revenge, Ritesh pressurizes Taani to marry him and take care of his children. Taani is forced to agree to save Anurag, who has been accused of Gulabo's murder. Only Ritesh can save Anurag. When Taani and Ritesh are about to marry, Anurag stops them. He has brought the police, which arrests Ritesh. Anurag's innocence is proved.

Taani and Anurag marry and start their new life together. Robindo also returns and marries Mauli's younger sister, Jonaki. One day, Taani, Anurag and Jonaki take Kuhu to a temple. There is an accident, and Kuhu dies after slipping down the steps of the temple. Taani goes into shock, blaming herself for not looking after Kuhu. Anurag decides to take Taani away to the US so that she can get over her grief. But Taani refuses, so Anurag decides to go alone. Soon, the family gets to know that Taani is pregnant with Anurag's child. Anurag, who does not know of Taani's pregnancy, is on his way to the airport. Taani calls him and asks him to meet her. Taani comes to meet Anurag, but Ritesh drives up from behind and crashes into him before he can get out of his car. Anurag and his car fall off a cliff. Everyone thinks that Anurag is dead. After some time, they tell Taani to get remarried to Sushant. But Taani is sure that Anurag will come back and so does not remarry.

Anurag survives the accident and returns home several months later. He sees that Taani is in labour, and Sushant is rushing her to the hospital. Anurag misunderstands this scene—he assumes that Sushant is Taani's new husband and the baby's father. Anurag does not want to interfere with Taani's new life, so he enters a mental asylum and acts like he is insane. A few years later, Taani has become a renowned singer. She gets to know that Anurag is alive in a mental asylum. She goes to see him and narrates the story of her life to a nurse. When Taani leaves, the nurse asks Anurag why he is hiding the truth, and he explains the reason. He decides to go far away but wants to see Taani and his family for the last time. As he reaches his house, a small girl comes running out of it. When Anurag asks her what her father's name is, she answers, "Anurag". He is thrilled and goes inside with his daughter. Taani sees him and runs towards him. But then she rebukes him for assuming she could ever forget him and move on. The duo hug and rejoice. In the end, everything is settled. Anurag and Taani happily begin their new life with their little daughter.

== Cast ==
=== Main ===
- Anupriya Kapoor as Taani Bimlendu Banerjee / Taani Anurag Ganguly – Laboni and Bimlendu's daughter; Taposh's sister; Sushant's ex-fiancée; Anurag's wife (2010–2011)
- Harshad Chopda as Anurag Shekhar Ganguly – Nilanjana and Shekhar's son; Ananya and Robindo's brother; Nupur's ex-fiancé; Taani's husband (2010–2011)
- Rajat Tokas as Robindo Shekhar Ganguly – Nilanjana and Shekhar's son; Ananya and Anurag's brother; Mauli's ex-fiance; Jonaki's husband (2010–2011)
- Shakti Arora as Taposh Bimlendu Banerjee – Laboni and Bimlendu's son; Taani's brother; Mauli's husband (2010–2011)
- Neha Saxena as Mauli Sharma / Mauli Taposh Banerjee – Jonaki's sister; Robindo's ex-fiance; Taposh's wife (2010–2011)

=== Recurring ===
- Ruchi Savarn as Jonaki Sharma / Jonaki Robindo Ganguly – Mauli's sister; Robindo's wife (2010–2011)
- Neha Janpandit/Reshmi Ghosh as Nupur Basu – Anurag's ex-fiancée (2010–2011)
- Kali Prasad Mukherjee as Shekhar Ganguly – Bimlendu's friend; Nilanjana's husband; Ananya, Anurag and Robindo's father (2010–2011)
- Geetanjali Tikekar as Nilanjana Shekhar Ganguly – Shekhar's wife; Ananya, Anurag and Robindo's mother (2010–2011)
- Supriya Shukla as Laboni Bimlendu Banerjee – Bimlendu's wife; Taani and Taposh's mother (2010–2011)
- Virendra Singh as Bimlendu Banerjee – Shekhar's friend; Laboni's husband; Taani and Taposh's father (2010)
- Roosha Chatterjee/Garima Bhatnagar as Ananya Shekhar Ganguly / Ananya Ritesh Basu – Nilanjana and Shekhar's daughter; Anurag and Robindo's sister; Ritesh's wife (2010)/(2010–2011)
- Nikhil Arya as Ritesh Basu –Ananya's husband (2010–2011)
- Aadesh Chaudhary as Subodh Bhattacharya – Anurag and Taani's childhood friend (2010)
- Anurag Sharma as Sushant Mehra – Anurag's friend; Taani's ex-fiancé (2010, 2011)
- Rithvik Dhanjani as Partho Rawal – Anurag's friend (2010)
- Sanjay Gagnani as Jackie Ramnani – Nupur’s friend (2010)
- Tanya Abrol as Pranjali Trivedi – Anurag and Taani’s childhood friend (2010)
- Sangeeta Kapure as Gulabo – Ritesh's mistress (2010)
- Prachi Deshmukh as Teenage Taani (2010)
- Devarsh Thakkar as Teenage Anurag (2010)
- Meghan Jadhav as Teenage Subodh (2010)
- Kritika Sharma as Teenage Mauli (2010)

== Soundtrack ==
No.	Title	Lyrics	Music	Singer(s)	Length
1.	"Tere Liye" (Male Version)	Devendra Kafir	Sunil Singh	Kailash Kher	5:11
2.	"Tere Liye" (Female Version)	Devendra Kafir	Sunil Singh	Himani Kapoor	5:11

== Reception ==
The series opened with high rating of 3.8 TVR in its debut week. The following week it rose to 3.9 TVR. In week 49 of 2010, it was the ninth most Hindi GEC with 4.0 TVR.

== Awards ==
Year	Award	Category	Recipient	Result	Reference
2010	Indian Television Academy Awards	Best Actor Drama Jury	Harshad Chopda	Nominated	
2010	Indian Television Academy Awards	Best Title Song	Kailash Kher	Won	
2010	Indian Television Academy Awards	Gr8! Performer Of The Year (Male)	Harshad Chopda	Won	
2010	Indian Television Academy Awards	Best Debut (Female)	Anupriya Kapoor	Won	
2010	Indian Telly Awards	Best Title Song	Kailash Kher	Won	
2010	Indian Telly Awards	Best Fresh New Face (Female)	Anupriya Kapoor	Won	
2010	Indian Telly Awards	Best Actor (Popular)	Harshad Chopda	Won	
2010	Indian Telly Awards	Best Child Actress	Prachi Deshmukh	Nominated	
2011	Gold Awards	Best Director (Jury)	Ravindra Gautam	Won	
2011	Gold Awards	Highest Voted Actor (Female)	Reshmi Ghosh	Won	
2011	Gold Awards	Show Ruling TRP Charts Of The Year	Ekta Kapoor	Won	
2011	Gold Awards	Best Actor in a Lead Role	Harshad Chopda	Nominated	
2011	Indian Television Academy Awards	Best Actor Drama Popular	Harshad Chopda	Nominated	
