= Partho Mitra =

Indian director

- Born: New Delhi
- Occupations: Film and television director
- Years active: 2001–present
- Known for: Koi Aap Sa; Bade Achhe Lagte Hain

Partho Mitra is an Indian director known for work in Hindi film, television and digital industry. His works as director includes the popular Indian soap operas Kahaani Ghar Ghar Kii, Bade Achhe Lagte Hain, Kasamh Se and Itna Karo Na Mujhe Pyaar. He has also directed Bollywood film Koi Aap Sa and web series Hum - I'm Because of Us.

== Filmography ==
=== Films ===
Year	Title	Role	Notes
2005	Koi Aap Sa	Director	

=== Television ===
Year	Title	Notes
1994-1996	Shanti	
2000-2006	Kahaani Ghar Ghar Kii	
2006-2009	Kasamh Se	
2009-2011	Bandini	
2009-2014	Pavitra Rishta	
2010-2011	Pyaar Kii Ye Ek Kahaani	
2011-2014	Bade Achhe Lagte Hain	
2013-2019	Yeh Hai Mohabbatein	
2015-2016	Itna Karo Na Mujhe Pyaar	

=== Web series ===
Year	Title	Notes
2018	Hum - I'm Because of Us	
2020	Naxalbari	
