= Bahu Hamari Rajni Kant =

Indian television series

- Genre: Science fiction Sitcom
- Written by: Sameer Garud; Gaurav Sharma; Gauri Kodimala; Kovid Gupta; Nitin Keswani; Rajesh Chawla
- Creative director: Tanya Mukherjee
- Starring: Ridhima Pandit; Karan Grover
- Theme music composer: Prakash Viraj
- Country of origin: India
- Original language: Hindi
- No. of seasons: 1
- No. of episodes: 261

Production
- Producers: Sonali Jaffar; Amir Jaffar
- Production location: Mumbai
- Cinematography: Hrishikesh Gandhi Manish Sharma
- Camera setup: Single-camera
- Running time: 20 minutes
- Production company: Full House Media

Original release
- Network: Life OK
- Release: 15 February 2016 – 13 February 2017

Bahu Hamari Rajni Kant (transl. Our Daughter-in-Law Rajni Kant) is an Indian science fiction sitcom television series, which aired from 15 February 2016 to 13 February 2017 on Life OK.

== Plot ==
Shantanu Kant, a scientist creates a super humanoid robot with the help of his best friend Devendra Bangdu.The robot is named RAJNI, short for "Randomly Accessible Jobs Network Interface", a robot with 10X the power of hulk, a human's body, a pretty face and a brain faster than 100 computers.

The robot was made for saving humans' life. After a few episodes, Shaan made Rajni his wife as he did not want to take burden of wedding along with his dreams and aspirations of becoming a renowned scientist. The Kant's women do not like Rajni as her daughter-in-law due to Rajni's weird behaviour, and also because Surili (Shaan's mom) wanted a classy Bengali girl as her 'bahu' - so, Surili never accepts Rajni as her daughter-in-law by heart. But, the Kant's men always favour Rajni and like her nature.

Many problems arise in the Kant family-some of them come by themselves and some are unintentionally created by Rajni as she does not understand humans accurately. But, Rajni always saves the Kants from all these troubles-sometimes with the help of Shaan and Dev. Later Rajni misinterpreted Shaan's command and changed his face by plastic surgery which creates some problems but later all confusions are cleared by Shaan. In the middle of all this, other confusions arises which made Shaan to dismantle Rajni. Kants have gone bankrupt post. Shaan been in USA, returns with his fiancée Ria. The Kant fix the marriage to get their wealth by Ria's rich family.

It is then revealed that Rajni saved herself from the factory 5 years ago where she had found an infant on the streets and had decided to adopt him but Rajni was not updated with latest technologies. Rajni's adoptive son named as R.A.M, incidentally help Kant's family who were then invited to Kant Nivaas where Ria finds out about Rajni and broke up the alliance. Shaan then decides to divorce Rajni. Meanwhile, the court gives Shaan and Rajni 6 months' time to their marriage.

In these 6 months, Rajni wins everyone's, including Shaan's trust back, but later she was proven to be a human by Surili. Soon it gets revealed that the girl was Rajjo, the duplicate of Rajni.

Soon Shaan and Rajjo start developing mutual feelings for each other. Amrish learns about Rajni's truth, he accepts her, but this reunion is stopped by a robot from other planet who looks exactly as Shaan, and asks Rajini to come with him. She is about to leave when Shaan, R.A.M and Amrish try to stop her, but being given command to leave with Shaan-like robot, she turns away. The robots fly away, leaving the three (Shaan, Amrish, R.A.M) in tears when Shaan finds a small machine on the ground, presumably belonging to the robot from other planet and he believes to bring back Rajni with the device.

== Cast ==
=== Main ===
- Ridhima Pandit as Rajni "Rajjo" Kant: Humanoid robot; Dev's adopted sister; Shaan's wife; R.A.M's adoptive mother (2016–2017)
- Karan Grover as Shantanu "Shaan" Kant: Scientist; Surili and Amrish's second son; Gyaan, Dhyaan and Shogota's brother; Samaira's ex-lover; Dev's friend; Rajni's husband; R.A.M's adoptive father (2016)
  - Raqesh Bapat as Shantanu "Shaan" Kant: Bapat replaced Grover in 2016. (2016–2017)

=== Recurring ===
- Pallavi Pradhan as Surili Chattopadhyay Kant: Amartya's sister; Amrish's wife; Gyaan, Shaan, Dhyaan and Shogota's mother; Kuhu's grandmother; R.A.M's adoptive grandmother (2016–2017)
- Rajendra Chawla as Amrish Kant: Bubbles's brother; Surili's husband; Gyaan, Shaan, Dhyaan and Shogota's father; Kuhu's grandfather; R.A.M's adoptive grandfather (2016–2017)
- Aryan Prajapati as R.A.M Kant: Rajni and Shaan's adopted son (2016–2017)
- Mehul Nisar as Gyaan Kant: Surili and Amrish's eldest son; Shaan, Dhyaan and Shogota's brother; Maggie's husband; Kuhu's father (2016–2017)
- Vahbbiz Dorabjee as Maggie Kant: Balwanth's sister; Gyaan's wife; Kuhu's mother (2016–2017)
- Palak Dey as Kuhu Kant: Gyaan and Maggie's daughter (2016)
- Pankit Thakker as Dhyaan Kant: Surili and Amrish youngest son; Gyaan, Shaan and Shogota's brother; Sharmila's husband (2016-2017)
- Tanvi Thakkar as Sharmila Kant: Samaira's cousin; Dhyaan's wife (2016–2017)
- Neha Kaul as Shogata Kant: Surili and Amrish's daughter; Gyaan, Shaan and Dhyaan's sister; Dev's ex-wife; Matthew's girlfriend; Vikram’s fiancée (2016–2017)
- Neel Motwani as Devendra "Dev" Bangdu: Shaan's friend; Rajni's adoptive brother; Shogota's ex-husband (2016–2017)
- Sweety Walia as Bubbles Kant Chattopadhyay: Amrish's sister; Amartya's wife (2016)
- Divyanka Tripathi as TV News Reporter (2016)
- Karanvir Bohra as Karanvir : Shaan's Classmate (2016)
- Anita Hassanandani Reddy as Priya : Shaan's classmate friend (2016)
- Sumit Kaul as Amartya Chattopadhyay: Surili's brother; Bubbles's husband (2016)
- Aly Goni as Virat Batra: Poonam's husband (2016)
- Anokhee Anand as Aishwarya: Kant family's servant
- Shiny Doshi as Samaira Ghosh: Sharmila's cousin; Shaan's ex-lover (2016)
- Sonu Mishra as Yuvraj Singhaniya
- Suhaas Ahuja as Matthew Hudson: Shaan's boss; Shogota's boyfriend (2016,2017)
- Krishna Bharadwaj as Balwanth: Maggie's brother (2016)
- Abhilash Kumar as Vikram Oberoi: Ria's brother (2016)
- Piya Valecha as Ria Oberoi: Vikram's sister; Shaan's ex-fiancée (2016)
- Archana Singh Rajput as Debolina Chatoupadhyay
- Daya Shankar Pandey as Dugdugi Baba (2016)

=== Guest ===
- Emraan Hashmi as Himself
- Hina Khan as Neha
- Iqbal Khan as Robot
