= Deewani =

Indian television series

- Promotional poster
- Genre: Drama; Romance
- Written by: Dialogues; Abhishek Sharma
- Screenplay by: Gautham Hegde
- Story by: Pearl Grey; Divya Nayyar; Lakshmi Jaykumar
- Directed by: Amit D. Malik; Devendra Pandey
- Starring: Aditi Sanwal; Nitin Goswami
- Composer: Prakash Jaykawad
- Country of origin: India
- Original language: Hindi
- No. of seasons: 1
- No. of episodes: 234

Production
- Producers: Shyamsheesh Bhattacharya; Nilima Vajpayee
- Cinematography: Pradeep M Gupta
- Editors: Afzal Khan; Mithilesh
- Camera setup: Multi-camera
- Running time: 22-24 minutes
- Production company: Shakuntalam Telefilms

Original release
- Network: Dangal TV
- Release: 18 March – 14 December 2024

Deewani (transl. Crazy lover) is an Indian Hindi-language drama television series that airs on Dangal under the banner of Shakuntalam Telefilms and stars Aditi Sanwal and Nitin Goswami It premiered from 18 March 2024 to 14 December 2024.

== Plot ==
Meera is a teenager who lives with her family in Uttar Pradesh. She has a secret crush / obsession with Parth. Parth does not know who she is. Parth is the son of a famous businessman, Madan Thakur. Parth has a bad relationship with his father but is close to his grandma and brother. Parth is in love with Payal and Meera looks at Parth as a guide on how to love someone. Meera's parents think badly of Parth and advise her to stay away from him. Meera and Parth become friends despite her parents's rules. Meera helps Parth with his relationship with Payal but discovers Payal is using Parth after she learns about her affair towards her friend, Tharun so she exposes Payal's truth to Parth.

Parth, after discovering Payal's truth and confronts her at on the terrace of a building and she reveals how she never loved him. Due to their altercation, Parth's brother, Garv, accidentally pushes Payal from the terrace which leads to her death. To avoid Garv's arrest and the damage to the family’s reputation, Parth takes the blame and is arrested. Meera is shocked to learn this but her parents blackmail her and she is sent away to complete her further education.

Parth is then released from jail after 7 years as Meera has completed her education. Parth and Meera meet each other and Meera proposes to Parth. He rejects it as he hates love due to the prior incident. Meanwhile, Garv falls for Meera as Meera's family and the Thakur family has fixed Garv and Meera's marriage, unaware of the truth. Meanwhile, Parth's grandmother and Sheela discover Parth and Meera's relationship. Manju also discovers their relationship and exposes them on their wedding day as Garv fights with Parth. Meera blames the family members causing Parth's grandmother to suffer a panic attack. She then asks Meera to marry Parth and they agree and get married but her family disowns her and doesn't accept Parth, while Sheela doesn't accept Meera and starts to hate her alongside Garv, Manju, Sahil, and Mr. Thakur, Manju's husband, while Madan, Parth's grandmother, Manju's daughter, Pragya, and her husband, Nachiket, support her. Sheela and Manju then start to humiliate Meera and Garv decides to take revenge against the couple.

Parth and Meera start to fall for each other as Manju's son, Sahil, falls for Meera's younger sister, Smriti "Bittu". However, Priyal, Payal's twin sister, seeks revenge against Parth for her sister's death and she poses herself as Payal. Parth mistakes Priyal for Payal so he decides to marry her by divorcing Meera as Priyal falls for Parth. Meera discovers the truth and exposes Priyal to Parth by bringing Priyal's family. Meera reveals Parth's innocence to Priyal but Priyal doesn't believe this and pushes Parth off of a cliff. He survives but is injured and is hospitalized and Garv gives money for his treatment.

Parth returns after his injuries heal and does odd jobs as some companies reject him due to his murder charges with respect to Payal. Devika Basu, a modeling photographer, is attracted to Parth and offers him a job as a model. Meera encourages him and then he agrees to work with her as Garv continues trying to separate Parth and Meera. It is then revealed that Devika is suffering from a mental illness and she becomes obsessed with Parth and decides to separate the couple. Meera discovers Devika's intention and decides to save her relationship. However, Devika hires Rudra, a hitman, to separate Meera and Parth as Rudra falls for Meera and himself becomes obsessed. Meanwhile, Sahil impregnates Smriti and cheats on her, and he refuses to accept her child as his. Meera and Parth discover this and lash out at him but Smriti tries to commit suicide as Meera stops her. Garv takes this as an opportunity to separate Meera and Parth by using her sister and he marries Smriti.

Garv forces Smriti to miscarry her child and makes Smriti believe that Meera caused her miscarriage. Smriti starts to blame Meera while Devika and Rudra create many problems. Smriti finally discovers the truth exposes Garv and leaves. On Janmashtami, Devika and Rudra separate Parth and Meera. Rudra causes an explosion and kidnaps Meera. Meera then discovers the truth about Rudra. Rudra then forces Meera by blackmailing her, and she has no choice but is forced to live with him as Parth and the entire family assume that Meera is dead. Meera's father, Sanjeev, blames them for the loss of his daughter.

Meera lives with Rudra for one year as Rudra keeps and tortures Meera. Parth, who misses Meera, lives with her memories, even though his family has fixed his marriage with Devika. It is then revealed that Rudra forced Meera to write the fake letter to Parth asking him to marry Devika causing Parth decided to marry Devika. Devika, who becomes succeeded after separating Parth and Meera is unaware that Meera is still alive. Meera's mother, Chhaya, is killed in an accident. Parth and Meera meet each other. However, Parth believes Meera cheated on him and chose to marry Rudra so he decides to marry Devika. Smriti returns to the family to seek revenge against them as Garv and Sahil defamed her. Smriti teaches both Garv, Sahil, Manju, and Sheela a good lesson.

Meera escapes from Rudra's trap and returns to stop Parth and Devika's marriage. Meera made Rudra believe that Devika kidnapped her. He kidnaps Devika and brings her in a house, but Meera brings Parth and exposes Devika and Rudra's truth after both Devika and Rudra confesses their crimes to each other. Smriti reveals the truth about Devika and Rudra to the family thus reuniting Meera and Parth as Devika is sent to a mental asylum while Rudra is sent to jail. However, they still plot to separate the couple.

Rudra discovers Madan is his father and he had caused his mother, Vrinda's, and his sister, Varsha's, death. It is revealed that Madan had a marital affair with Vrinda when he was married to Sheela. Madan marries Vrinda whom is later unaware of the truth, When Vrinda gives birth to Varsha and Rudra. Vrinda then discovers the truth but Sheela finds out this and then forces Madan to break his relationship with Vrinda which causes Vrinda to kill their children's by poisoning them and commit suicide, but Rudra survives the incident. Madan, Sheela, and his mother had kept this a secret from everyone. Rudra exposes his identity to everyone as Madan and Sheela discover Rudra is Madan's son and therefore Parth and Garv's half-brother. The entire family is shocked to learn this truth.

Parth lashes out at Madan for keeping the secret, while Rudra decides to take revenge against the family members. Rudra creates many problems to destroy the family. Later on, Meera finds out she is pregnant. Rudra instigates the family by saying Meera is carrying his child. Meera does a paternity test, but Rudra switches the report. Everyone, including Parth, believes that Meera is carrying Rudra's child. Eventually, Meera finds proof against Rudra that he is not Madan's son Rudra, but used the fact that they shared the same name to enter the family. She also shows the real paternity reports and proves that she did not cheat Parth. Parth, in his anger, decides to confront Rudra. They fight and Rudra falls down a cliff. While trying to help pull Rudra up, Rudra instead pulls Parth down and both falls down to the cliff as the family presumes Parth to being dead.

The family hides the truth from Meera as to not stress her out since she is carrying Parth's baby and his last memento. By chance, Dadi finds Krishna, a petty thief, at a temple. She requests him to become Parth for a year, until Meera delivers the baby, in exchange for money. Krishna then agrees and then pretends himself as Parth, inside the family and Meera while Garv, whom wants to get rid of Smriti makes the family to believe that Smriti is mentally ill after Garv makes Smriti mixes a medicine on her food. But Meera discovers and exposes Garv to the family and gets him arrested thus ending Garv's evilness while the family decided to get Meera to marry Parth / Krishna as Krishna falls for Meera. Parth, who is revealed to be alive returns and stops Meera from marrying Krishna thus exposing Krishna's truth as Dadi reveal's the entire truth to everyone that how she helped Krishna to save Meera's relationship thus the family forgives Krishna. But Devika, who is escaped from the mental asylum seeks revenge, she then tries to shoot Parth but Krishna saves him gets shot and dies as Devika gets arrested for Krishna's murder and gets her jailed. The family then performs Krishna's last rites while the show ends with both Meera, Parth and the entire family living happily ever after.

== Cast ==
=== Main ===
- Aditi Sanwal as Meera Thakur: Sanjeev and Chhaya's elder daughter; Smriti's elder sister; Parth's wife (2024)
- Nitin Goswami as double role
  - Parth Thakur: Madan and Sheela's younger son; Vrinda's stepson; Varsha and Rudra's younger half-brother; Garv's younger brother; Pragya and Sahil's cousin; Meera's husband (2024)
  - Krishna Tyagi: Parth's lookalike; Gudiya's brother (2024) (Dead)

=== Recurring ===
- Rupa Divetia as Shakuntala Thakur / Dadi: Madan and Swaraj's mother; Varsha, Rudra, Garv, Parth, Sahil, and Pragya's grandmother (2024)
- Manish Khanna as Madan Thakur: Shakuntala's elder son; Swaraj's elder brother; Vrinda's widower; Sheela's husband; Varsha, Rudra, Garv and Parth's father (2024)
- Charul Bhavsar as Sheela Thakur: Madan's first wife; Garv and Parth's mother; Varsha and Rudra's stepmother (2024)
- Anjali Gupta as Vrinda Thakur: Madan's second wife; Varsha and Rudra's mother; Garv and Parth's stepmother (2024) (Dead)
- Vijay Tilani as Garv Thakur: Madan and Sheela's elder son; Parth's elder brother; Varsha and Rudra's younger half-brother; Pragya and Sahil's cousin; Payal's murderer; Meera's ex-fiancé; Smriti's husband (2024)
- Zeel Takkar as Smriti "Bittu" Thakur: Sanjeev and Chhaya's younger daughter; Meera's younger sister; Sahil's ex-lover; Garv's wife (2024)
- Siraj Mustafa Khan as Swaraj Thakur: Shakuntala's younger son; Madan's younger brother; Manju's husband; Sahil and Pragya's father; Varsha, Rudra, Garv and Parth's uncle (2024)
- Mona Mokhha as Manju Thakur: Swaraj's wife; Sahil and Pragya's mother; Varsha, Rudra, Garv and Parth's aunt (2024)
- Viplove Sharma as Sahil Thakur: Swaraj and Manju's son; Pragya's elder brother; Varsha, Rudra, Garv, and Parth's cousin; Smriti's ex-lover (2024)
- Palak Rana as Pragya Thakur: Swaraj and Manju's daughter; Sahil's younger sister; Varsha, Rudra, Garv and Parth's cousin; Nachiket's wife (2024)
- Unknown as Nachiket Thakur: Pragya's husband (2024)
- Junaid Ahmad as Sanjeev Tiwari: Chhaya's widower; Meera and Smriti's father (2024)
- Ishrat Khan as Chhaya Tiwari: Sanjeev's wife; Meera and Smriti's mother (2024) (Dead)
- Unknown as Dev: Parth's friend (2024)
- Unknown as Shiv: Parth's friend (2024)
- Pankaj Pandey as Ravi: Parth's friend (2024)
- Mayank Ronyy as Pradeep: Parth's friend (2024)
- Sehrish Ali as double role
  - Payal Sharma: Priyal's elder twin sister; Parth's ex-girlfriend; Tharun's lover (2024) (Dead)
  - Priyal Sharma: Payal's younger twin sister; Parth's one-sided obsessive lover turned enemy (2024)
- Hunar Hali Gandhi as Devika Basu: Anurag's daughter; Parth's one-sided obsessive lover and ex-fiancée; Rudra's accomplice; Krishna's murderer (2024)
- Rohit Choudhary as Rudra Yadhav/ Fake Rudra Thakur: Mr. Yadhav and Ms. Yadhav's son; Neha's elder brother; Meera's one-sided obsessive lover; Devika's accomplice (2024) (Dead)
- Unknown as Gudiya Tyagi: Krishna's younger sister (2024)

== Production ==
=== Development and casting ===
The series was announced by Shakuntalam Telefilms in July 2023 and was confirmed in February 2024 by Dangal. Initially, Sonal Vengurlekar and Saumya Saraswat were in talks to play the female negative lead, but they later declined due to unspecified reasons. In August 2023, Nitin Goswami, Sanchita Ugale, Jyothi Mukherjee and Veronica Talreja joined the cast. Many of them later backed out due to late production development. In January 2024, Aditi Sanwal, Nitin Goswami and Sehrish Ali were signed as the leads.

=== Release ===
The first promo was released on 28 February 2024 featuring Aditi Sanwal, Nitin Goswami and Sehrish Ali. It was Launched on 18 March 2024. It replaced the television series Sasumaa Ne Meri Kadar Na Jaani.

== See also ==
- List of programmes broadcast by Dangal TV
