= Nitin Goswami =

Indian television and film actor

- Born: Hisar, Haryana, India
- Occupations: Actor, model
- Years active: 2013–present
- Known for: Sarojini – Ek Nayi Pehal, Deewani

Nitin Goswami is an Indian television and film actor known for his work in Hindi television series such as Sarojini – Ek Nayi Pehal and Deewani, as well as for his appearance in the film Badmashiyaan (2015).

== Early life and education ==
Goswami was born in Hisar, Haryana, India. He completed his schooling in Hisar before moving to Mumbai to pursue a career in acting and modelling.

== Career ==
Goswami began his career as a model and later transitioned to acting in Hindi television shows.

He gained early recognition through appearances in popular television series such as Qubool Hai and Kumkum Bhagya, often portraying supporting or antagonistic roles. His breakthrough came with the lead role in Sarojini – Ek Nayi Pehal on Zee TV.

In 2015, Goswami made his Bollywood debut with the romantic comedy film Badmashiyaan.

He later appeared in the web series Hasratein in 2022, and as of 2024, he portrayed the lead role in the television show Deewani on Dangal TV.

== Filmography ==
=== Films ===
Year	Title	Role	Notes
2015	Badmashiyaan	—	Bollywood debut

=== Television ===
Year	Title	Role	Network
2014	Qubool Hai	Supporting role	Zee TV
2015–2016	Sarojini – Ek Nayi Pehal	Supporting role	Zee TV
2017-2019	Siddhi Vinayak	Lead role	&TV
2024	Deewani	Lead role	Dangal TV
2025	Sanam Mere Humraaz	Lead role	Dangal TV

=== Web series ===
Year	Title	Platform	Notes
2022	Hasratein	—	—
