= Shiny Doshi =

Indian television actress (born 1989)

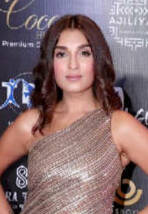
- Doshi in 2021
- Born: 15 September 1989 (age 37); Ahmedabad, Gujarat, India
- Occupation: Actress
- Years active: 2013–present
- Known for: Saraswatichandra; Sarojini - Ek Nayi Pehal; Jamai Raja; Khatron Ke Khiladi 8 Pandya Store
- Spouse: Lavesh Khairajani (m. 2021)

Shiny Doshi (born 15 September 1989) is an Indian actress who primarily works in Hindi television. She made her acting debut with Saraswatichandra. Doshi is best known for her roles in Sarojini - Ek Nayi Pehal, Jamai Raja and Pandya Store. She also participated in Khatron Ke Khiladi 8 and The 50.

== Early life ==
Doshi was born on 15 September 1989 in Ahmedabad, Gujarat into a Gujarati family. She studied fashion designing in Ahmedabad and later took up modelling.

== Personal life ==
Doshi's father suffered a heart attack while he was on Amarnath Yatra in Jammu and Kashmir and died on 12 July 2019.

Doshi got engaged to her boyfriend Lavesh Khairajani on 4 January 2020. She married Khairajani on 15 July 2021. They married at their home in Mumbai.

== Career ==
=== Modelling career ===
In 2011, Doshi started her career as a model. She has walked ramp and had been part of various TVCs. Her most known TVC was for a soap with actor Saif Ali Khan, that brought her into limelight.

=== Debut and breakthrough (2013–2018) ===
Doshi made her acting debut with Sanjay Leela Bhansali's Saraswatichandra. She signed it in 2011.

She portrayed Kusum Desai Vyas opposite Varun Kapoor from 2013 to 2014. She received Indian Telly Award for Fresh New Face - Female nomination for her performance.

From 2015 to 2016, she portrayed Sarojini Somendra Singh in Sarojini - Ek Nayi Pehal opposite Mohit Sehgal and Aamir Ali. Her performance gained her Gold Award for Debut in a Lead Role (Female) nomination.

In 2016, she portrayed Samaira Ghosh opposite Karan Grover in Bahu Hamari Rajni Kant. From 2016 to 2017, she portrayed Mahi Sengupta Khurrana in the third season of Jamai Raja, opposite Ravi Dubey. Most of her role in this show involved her being kidnapped and taken captive. It proved as a major turning point in her career.

Doshi participated in Fear Factor: Khatron Ke Khiladi 8 in 2017. She ended up at 11th place.

In 2018, she portrayed Khushi opposite Neil Bhatt in Laal Ishq. She did cameo in Dil Hi Toh Hai Season 1, opposite Karan Kundra, Episode 15 & 16 on Alt Balaji. She participated in Box Cricket League (BCL) Season 3 as contestant of Mumbai Tigers.

=== Recent work and success (2019–present) ===
From 2019 to 2020, Doshi portrayed Radha opposite Rajneesh Duggal in the finite series Shrimad Bhagwat Mahapuran.

She portrayed Sultana Sehar and other characters such as Marjinaa, Safina, Princess Nilofar, Princess Faria, Sultana Juhi and Yasmine in Alif Laila, opposite Ankit Arora in 2020.

That year, she made her web debut with Ratri Ke Yatri opposite Parag Tyagi. She portrayed Kavita in the third episode of the anthology.

Doshi received further praises and wider recognition with her portrayal of Dhara Patel Pandya in Pandya Store, opposite Kinshuk Mahajan. She is seen portraying Dhara Patel Pandya since January 2021. She hosted a StarPlus show Navratri - Ek Adbhoot Utsav.

In 2022, she reprised Dhara Pandya in the game show Ravivaar With Star Parivaar.

== Filmography ==
=== Television ===
Year	Title	Role	Notes	Ref.
2013–2014	Saraswatichandra	Kusum Desai Vyas		
2015–2016	Sarojini - Ek Nayi Pehal	Sarojini Somendra Singh		
2016	Box Cricket League	Contestant	Season 2	
2016	Bahu Hamari Rajni Kant	Samaira Ghosh		
2016–2017	Jamai Raja	Mahi Sengupta Khurrana		
2017	Fear Factor: Khatron Ke Khiladi 8	Contestant	11th place	
2018	Laal Ishq	Khushi	Episode: "Shakhchunni"	
2018	Box Cricket League	Contestant	Season 3	
2019–2020	Shrimad Bhagwat Mahapuran	Radha		
2020	Alif Laila	Sultana Saher		
2021–2023	Pandya Store	Dhara Pandya		
2022	Ravivaar With Star Parivaar	Dhara Pandya		
2026	The 50	Contestant	Eliminated day 23(21st/50th)	

==== Special appearances ====
Year	Title	Role	Ref.
2018	Dil Hi Toh Hai	Herself	
2020	Bigg Boss 13	Herself	
2021	Zee Comedy Show	Comedian	
2023	Teri Meri Doriyaann	Dhara Pandya	

=== Web series ===
Year	Title	Role	Notes	Ref.
2020	Ratri Ke Yatri	Kavita	Episode: "Mukti"	
2026	Ishk Dum Aur Idli Rasam	Meera Nair		

== Accolades ==
Year	Award	Category	Work	Result	Ref.
2013	Indian Telly Awards	Fresh New Face - Female	Saraswatichandra	Nominated	
2015	Gold Awards	Debut in a Lead Role (Female)	Sarojini - Ek Nayi Pehal	Nominated	
2021	Iconic Gold Awards	Shining Television Actress of the Year	Pandya Store	Won	
2022	Indian Television Academy Awards	Popular Actress (Drama)	Pandya Store	Nominated	
2023	Indian Telly Awards	Best Actress in a Lead Role	Pandya Store	Nominated	
2023	Gold Awards	Best Actress in a Lead Role	Pandya Store	Nominated	
2023	Gold Awards	Best Onscreen Jodi (with Kinshuk Mahajan)	Pandya Store	Nominated	

== See also ==
- List of Indian television actresses
- List of Hindi television actresses
