= Sonu Mishra =

Indian actor

- Born: July 30, 1996 (age 30); Buchawas, Churu district, Rajasthan, India
- Occupation: Actor
- Years active: 2010–present

Sonu Mishra (also known as Sonu Mmishra; born 30 July 1996) is an Indian actor who works predominantly in Indian cinema and Television. He has appeared in films including Salman Khan's Sikandar and Kala Hiran, and in television series such as Vighnaharta Ganesha, Tenali Rama, Mere Dad Ki Dulhan and others.

== Early life and career ==
Mishra was born on 30 July 1996 in Buchawas village in Churu district, Rajasthan, India. He completed his schooling in his hometown and later moved to Jaipur, where he received theatre training with the Sarthak Theatre Group at Jawahar Kala Kendra.

Mishra began his acting career in 2010 with the Rajasthani-language film Dhanna Jaat, in which he played Lord Krishna. He made his Hindi film debut with Rizwan, portraying Ziyad, and later appeared in Sikandar. In television, Mishra has appeared in Hindi series including Tenali Rama, Vighnaharta Ganesha and Savdhaan India. He also appeared in Ram Ram Bolo, a devotional music project based on the Hanuman Chalisa.

== Filmography ==
=== Films ===
Year	Title	Language	Role	Notes
2010	Dhanna Jaat	Rajasthani film	—	Debut film
2013	Educated Binadani	Rajasthani film	—	Lead role
2020	Rizwan	Hindi	Ziyad	Hindi film debut
2025	Sikandar	Hindi	Constable Jay	Starring Salman Khan
2025	Kala Hiran	Hindi	Salman Khan	Unreleased/withdrew from project

=== Television ===
Year	Title	Role	Network
2016	Amma	—	Zee TV
2016	Kuch Rang Pyar Ke Aise Bhi	—	Sony Entertainment Television
2016	Ek Duje Ke Vaaste	—	Sony Entertainment Television
2017	Tenali Rama	Prince	Sony SAB
2017–2018	Savdhaan India	Various roles	Star Bharat
2018	Bahu Hamari Rajni Kant	Yuvraj Singhaniya	Life OK
2018	Aisi Deewangi Dekhi Nahi Kahi	Sameer	Zee TV
2018	Kullfi Kumarr Bajewala	—	StarPlus
2019	Mere Dad Ki Dulhan	—	Sony Entertainment Television
2019–2020	Vighnaharta Ganesha	Veer Mahendra	Sony Entertainment Television
2020	Ek Duje Ke Vaaste 2	—	Sony Entertainment Television
2022–2024	Crime Alert	Various roles	Dangal

== Kala Hiran dispute ==
In June 2026, Mishra publicly distanced himself from Kala Hiran: The Battle for Legacy, a film reportedly inspired by the 1998 blackbuck poaching case involving Salman Khan. Mishra, who had been cast as a character resembling Khan and had filmed portions of the project, said that he withdrew after developing concerns over the film's portrayal of the actor.

Mishra stated that he had not initially been provided with the complete script and alleged that material subsequently shown to him included provisions requiring him to make negative statements about Khan during promotional activities. He cited creative and ethical differences with the makers as reasons for leaving the project.

The film subsequently became the subject of legal proceedings after Khan approached the Delhi High Court, alleging infringement of his personality and publicity rights. Veteran actor Govind Namdev, who was also associated with the film, separately distanced himself from the project following the release of its promotional material.
