= Hum – I'm Because of Us =

2018 Hindi web series created by Ekta Kapoor

- Genre: Web series Romance; Drama
- Created by: Ekta Kapoor
- Based on: Too Much Too Soon
- Developed by: Ekta Kapoor
- Screenplay by: Vibha Singh; Dialogues; Aparna Nadig
- Story by: Vibha Singh
- Directed by: Partho Mitra
- Creative director: Nimisha Pandey (ALTBalaji)
- Starring: Kushal Tandon; Ridhima Pandit; Karishma Sharma; Payal Bhojwani
- Composer: Ashish Rego
- Country of origin: India
- Original language: Hindi
- No. of seasons: 1
- No. of episodes: 20

Production
- Producers: Kamna Nirula Menezes; Fazila Allana
- Production locations: Mumbai, India
- Editors: Vikas Sharma; Vishal Sharma; Sandip Bhatt
- Camera setup: Multi-camera
- Running time: 18–25 minutes
- Production company: SOL Productions

Original release
- Network: ALT Balaji
- Release: 30 July 2018

Hum – I'm Because of Us is a 2018 Hindi web series created by Ekta Kapoor for her video on demand platform, ALTBalaji. It stars Kushal Tandon and Ridhima Pandit as protagonists and is directed by Partho Mitra. The series revolves around the bond between three sisters who, despite having different ideas about life, share a strong sisterly bond.

The series is available for streaming on the ALT Balaji app and associated websites.

== Plot ==
The series revolves around three sisters Devina, Isha, and Sakshi who make their way to Mumbai to follow their dreams. Devina, the eldest sister, is sweet and simple and wants to hold the family together whereas Isha, the youngest sister, is smart and wants more from life. The series explores how their paths unravel as they develop their bonds as a family.

== Cast ==
- Kushal Tandon as Rahul Nanda
- Ridhima Panditas Devina Kapoor
- Karishma Sharma as Isha Kapoor
- Kanikka Kapur as Sakshi Kapoor
  - Payal Bhojwani as Young Sakshi Kapoor
- Payal Nair as Rooprani Kapoor
- Satyajit Sharma as Vikram Bedi
- Kasturi Maitra as Pammi Bedi
- Priyanka Panchal as Nishi Khanna
- Roma Navani as Rita Khanna
- Gulfam Khan as Joyce
- Kunal Thakur as Gaurav Gill

== List of episodes ==
- Episode 1: The Kapoor Girls
- Episode 2: Big City, Bigger Dreams, Bigger Everything
- Episode 3: Trouble in Paradise
- Episode 4: Dreams Do Come True
- Episode 5: Games People Play
- Episode 6: The Proposal
- Episode 7: The Twist in the Fairy Tale
- Episode 8: Diamonds are a Girl's Best Friend
- Episode 9: Decision and Sacrifices
- Episode 10: The Game Must Go on
- Episode 11: Heart vs Mind
- Episode 12: The Day of the Wedding
- Episode 13: Love and lies
- Episode 14: Betrayal and Broken Dreams
- Episode 15: The Separation
- Episode 16: A Night to Remember
- Episode 17: Hopes and Dreams never come true
- Episode 18: Money, Love and Broken Relationships
- Episode 19: A Day We Couldn't Forget
- Episode 20: Season Finale: Guilt and Revenge
