= Priyanka Bora (actress) =

Indian actress

- Born: 1994 (age 31–32); Gauripur, Assam, India
- Occupations: Actress; model
- Years active: 2015–present
- Known for: MTV Splitsvilla; Siddhi Vinayak; Ragini MMS: Returns

Priyanka Bora (born 1994) is an Indian television actress and model. She made her Indian television debut in the Season 8 of the reality show MTV Splitsvilla. She is known for her playing Prachi in Siddhi Vinayak and Aarti in Ragini MMS: Returns.

== Career ==
Born in Assam, Bora also worked as an airline crew member while making her debut in the reality show MTV Splitsvilla. She also participated in modelling shows in North East and later debuted in Hindi television in the soap opera Siddhi Vinayak.

Bora plays the role of Aarti in the web-series Ragini MMS: Returns. She also debuted in Assamese television in the series Mur Minoti Tora Hoi Jodi on Rang TV.

== Filmography ==
=== Films ===
Year	Title	Role	Language	Notes	Ref
2022	The Other Woman	Joy	Assamese, English, Hindi	Short film	
2023	Dr. Bezbaruah 2	Birina	Assamese		

=== Television ===
Year	Title	Role	Language	Notes	Ref.
2015	MTV Splitsvilla	Contestant	Hindi	Season 8	
2017–2019	Siddhi Vinayak	Prachi Joshi	Hindi	&TV	
2021	Mur Minoti Tora Hoi Jodi	Priti	Assamese	Rang TV	
2022	Runjun Nupure Maate	Runjun	Assamese	Rengoni TV	

=== Web series ===
Year	Title	Role	Platform
2017–2018	Ragini MMS: Returns	Aarti	ALTBalaji
2019	Size Matters	Sayara	Ullu

=== Music videos ===
Year	Song	Singer(s)	Ref.
2020	"Saathiya"	Ranjan Sarma	
2024	"Bolde Bolde"	Arun Solanki, Himan Joshi	
