= Siddhi Vinayak =

Indian television series

- Genre: Romantic; Thriller; Drama
- Created by: Prashant Bhatt; Sanjay Memane
- Written by: Renu Watwani; Vishal Watwani; Salil Sand; Agam gaurav
- Directed by: Santosh Bhatt
- Starring: See below
- Country of origin: India
- Original language: Hindi
- No. of seasons: 2
- No. of episodes: 317

Production
- Producers: Prashant Bhatt; Sanjay K. Memane
- Camera setup: Multi-camera
- Running time: 22 minutes
- Production companies: Studio B & M

Original release
- Network: ZEE5 &TV
- Release: 26 October 2017 – 18 January 2019

Siddhi Vinayak is an Indian romantic thriller television series that aired from 26 October 2017 to 18 January 2019 on &TV. The series is produced by Prashant Bhatt and Sanjay Memane. After a successful run, the show was replaced by Main Bhi Ardhangini.

== Seasons ==
The Series Launched in October 2017 on &TV. Season 1 ran from October 2017 - February 2018 and starred Neha Saxena and Nitin Goswami as Siddhi and Vinayak, respectively.

In January 2018 it was announced that SiddhiVinayak (Season 1) will be ending with a leap leading to the start of Season 2. In February 2018, Season 2 began with Farnaz Shetty who replaced Neha Saxena as Siddhi and Nitin Goswami reprised his role as Vinayak.

Season 1 was a Romantic Thriller Drama during its run. Season 2 was firstly a Revenge Drama and in July 2018 the season 2 shifted to a Romantic Thriller Drama.

Siddhi Vinayak gained immense popularity after its launch and had been giving great numbers for the channel. The show was also successful internationally; in the UK, the show became &TV UK’s top show during its run.

The show ended in January 2019 after a successful run.

== Plot ==
Siddhi Vinayak is the story of Siddhi Joshi (Neha Shakti Arora), a junior dancer, and Vinayak "Vin" Kundra (Nitin Goswami), a superstar actor. Siddhi and Vinayak grew up together but a misunderstanding causes them to separate and they meet again 14 years later. When Siddhi realises Vin is Vinayak, she lashes out at him for causing the accident that left her father paralysed back when they were kids. As Vin tries to apologise to Siddhi, they are attacked and Vin watches helplessly as Siddhi is caught in a fire. Vin thinks Siddhi was killed by his father Shankar.

=== One year later ===
Siddhi is forced to undergo a plastic surgery and with help from Dr. Pratima assumes the look and identity of Riddhi (Farnaz Shetty), her dead granddaughter. She gets a job as Vinayak's secretary to take revenge from him thinking he was responsible for the attack on her. In her absence, Vin has become distant from his father and has been taking care of Siddhi's family disguised as an NGO worker called Prateek. Siddhi's family have still been waiting for her.

Riddhi gradually discovers that Vin has been innocent all along. Meanwhile, Vin's cousin Rajbeer and his wife Prachi (who is also Siddhi's sister) make several plans to kill Vin as does Vin's other brother Manbeer's wife, Gauri. Discovering his innocence, Riddhi saves Vin risking her own life and realises she has fallen in love. She also finds out that while Shankar had paid goons to kidnap Siddhi, someone else had set her on fire and attacked Vin. Vin's family's priest, Guru ji, warns them that his life is in danger and can be saved only if he is married to a woman who will protect him at all costs. Vin's mother Manjari convinces him to agree and his wedding is fixed to a woman named Vaibhavi. However, Riddhi exposes Vaibhavi and her mother Kanta to be frauds. Vin has an accident and to save him Riddhi marries him while he is unconscious with only Shankar, Manjari, Manbeer and Guru ji knowing about the wedding. Manjari is revealed to have been behind all the attacks on Vin and shown to be doing it to control the Kundra property. Vin falls in love with Riddhi not knowing she is Siddhi and is already married to him.

Shivam Sen comes to Kundra Mansion and convinces everyone that Siddhi is his wife Riddhi and mother of Juhi. Manjari supports Shivam. Vin finally finds out Riddhi is in fact his wife and is Siddhi. He tries to get her back but Siddhi is attacked. Manjari kidnaps Juhi and makes it look like Shivam is responsible. Vin comes to save Manjari and Juhi, but Manjari shoots Shivam and kills him. When police arrive, Vin takes the blame and goes to jail. Siddhi figures out Manjari is the murderer and is trying to kill her. Manjari sends a man named Kabir to kill Vin while he is in jail but Vin is able to escape. Siddhi eventually proves Vin's innocence in court and brings him home.

While everyone in the Kundra family celebrate Vin's return, a man named Rudra enters the Kundra Mansion stating he is the long lost son of Shankar and Manjari. It is finally revealed that Shankar gave up Rudra after he was born to protect Vin as per a prophecy and that Manjari had been acting against Vin all along because Vin is her stepson while Rudra is her biological son. Rudra falls for Siddhi but marries a woman named Urvashi. At a festival, Siddhi saves Vin from being shot at by Rudra. However, someone shoots Rudra and he dies. Vin misunderstands Siddhi and marries a pregnant Urvashi. Siddhi refuses to leave the Kundra mansion stating that she and Vin are still a married couple. In the end Prachi and Rajbeer join forces with Siddhi to expose Urvashi and Manjari to Vinayak. After a lot of unsuccessful plans from both teams: Manjari's team and Siddhi's team, Siddhi finally exposes Urvashi in front of everyone. Vinayak instantly regrets doubting Siddhi and tries to make it up to her but Siddhi refuses to go back to him. After multiple tries to win Siddhi back, one time during what was supposed to be Siddhi's surprise birthday party by Vinayak. Siddhi runs off after destroying everything prepared by Vin for her birthday. With tears running down her cheeks, Siddhi refuses to listen to Vin who us running after her trying to apologise. Suddenly a truck appears from nowhere and almost hits Siddhi but Vinayak jumps in instead and pushes Siddhi aside to save her. Seeing that selfless act by Vinayak Siddhi softens up and takes him to the hospital. After Vinayak gets discharged from hospital Siddhi goes back to the Kundra mansion as his wife.The show ends as Siddhi and Vinayak getting married.

== Cast ==
=== Main ===
- Nitin Goswami as Vinayak "Vin" Kundra (superstar): Shankar and Preeti's son; Rajbeer's cousin; Manjari's step-son;Rudra's half-brother; Siddhi's husband; Urvashi's namesake husband
- Neha Saxena (before plastic surgery) / Farnaz Shetty (after plastic surgery) as: Siddhi Vinayak Kundra (née Joshi)-a junior dancer: Aniket and Savitra's elder daughter; Prachi's elder sister; Vinayak's wife

=== Recurring ===
- Roshni Rastogi as Urvashi Kundra, an actress: Rudra's widow and unborn child's mother; Vinayak's namesake second wife
- Utkarsha Naik as Manjari Kundra, Vinayak's stepmother; Rudra's biological mother; Shankar's second wife
- Shardul Pandit as Shivam Sen, Riddhi’s husband and Juhi's father
- Ayesha Vindhara as Juhi Sen, Shivam and Riddhi's daughter
- Gaurav S Bajaj as Rudra Kundra, Manjari's long-lost son, Vinayak's half-brother; Urvashi's first husband and unborn child's father (deceased)
- Manish Khanna as Shankar Kundra,Biljee's brother; Vinayak and Rudra's father; Manjri's husband
- Lucky Mehta as gauri elder daughter-in-law of Shankar kundra
- Karan Khandelwal as Rajbeer Kundra, Bijlee's son, Vinayak's cousin/brother, Prachi's husband
- Nishi Singh as Bijlee Kundra, Rajbeer's mother
- Priyanka Bora as Prachi Kundra (née Joshi): Aniket and Savitra's younger daughter; Siddhi's younger sister; Rajbeer's wife
- Prithvi Sankala as Aniket Joshi, Siddhi and Prachi's father
- Anjali Gupta as Savita Joshi, Siddhi and Prachi's mother
- Amar Deep Garg as Guru ji
- Farah Hussain as Zai, Siddhi's friend
