= Ridhima Pandit =

Indian actress (born 1990)

- Pandit in 2017
- Born: 25 June 1990 (age 36); Mumbai, Maharashtra, India
- Occupations: Actress; model; television host
- Years active: 2016–present

Ridhima Pandit (born 25 June 1990) is an Indian actress, model, and television host who works in Hindi television. She is known for her role of Rajni Kant in Bahu Hamari Rajni Kant. In 2019, she participated in Khatron Ke Khiladi 9 and became the 2nd runner-up. In 2021, she participated in Bigg Boss OTT 1.

== Early life ==
Pandit was born on 25 June 1990 in Mumbai, Maharashtra, India.

== Career ==
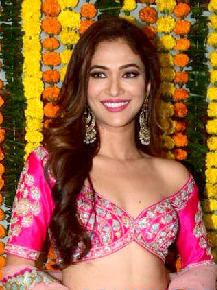
Pandit at an event in 2019

Pandit started her career as a model; her modeling projects included Sunsilk, Fair & Lovely, Dove, Harpic, Veet, Luminous, and Set Wet.

In February 2016, Ridhima made her acting debut in the Hindi television industry with Life OK's sitcom Bahu Hamari Rajni Kant. The show garnered her praise for her portrayal of Rajni, a super-humanoid robot, and she received the Gold Award for Debut in a Lead Role – Female. The show ended in February 2017. In 2017, she also performed in Sony Entertainment Television's The Drama Company.

Venturing into digital content, Pandit appeared in Voot's web series Yo Ke Hua Bro. Star Plus signed her to host the dance competition reality show Dance Champions that year. She also portrayed a sweet Devina Kapoor in ALT Balaji's romantic web series Hum - I'm Because of Us, created by Ekta Kapoor in 2018.

In 2019, Pandit participated in Colors TV's stunt-based reality show Fear Factor: Khatron Ke Khiladi 9, emerging as the second runner-up. She then appeared in a second Colors TV production, the comical game show Khatra Khatra Khatra.

From August 2019 to February 2020, Ridhima portrayed Amrita Sharma in Zee TV's science fiction drama Haiwaan : The Monster, produced by Kapoor. In 2021, she participated in Bigg Boss OTT, and was evicted on Day 18 along with her connection Karan Nath.

She played the role of Priya Sawant in the 2024 Netflix movie Sikandar Ka Muqaddar. In August 2025 she joined the Sony Sab show Ufff..Yeh Love Hai Mushkil, playing the role of Lata.

== Media image ==
In the Times Most Desirable Women on Indian Television list, Pandit was placed 8th in 2017, 9th in 2018 and 16th in 2019.

== Filmography ==
=== Films ===
| Year | Title | Role | Language | Ref. |
|---|---|---|---|---|
| 2024 | Sikandar Ka Muqaddar | Priya Sawant | Hindi | |
| 2025 | Ari: My Name Is Nobody | | Telugu | |
| 2025 | Premachi Goshta 2 | Priya | Marathi | |

=== Television ===
| Year | Title | Role | Notes | Ref. |
|---|---|---|---|---|
| 2016–2017 | Bahu Hamari Rajni Kant | Rajni "Rajjo" Kant | | |
| 2017 | The Drama Company | Contestant | | |
| 2017 | Dance Champions | Host | | |
| 2019 | Fear Factor: Khatron Ke Khiladi 9 | Contestant | 2nd runner-up | |
| 2019–2020 | Haiwaan : The Monster | Amrita Agnihotri | | |
| 2020 | Kundali Bhagya | Amrita Agnihotri | Guest appearance | |
| 2021 | Bigg Boss OTT | Contestant | 11th place | |
| 2025 | Ufff..Yeh Love Hai Mushkil | Snehlata "Lata" Jha | | |
| 2026 | The 50 | Contestant | | |

=== Web series ===
| Year | Title | Role | Notes | Ref. |
|---|---|---|---|---|
| 2017 | Yo Ke Hua Bro | Ragini | | |
| 2018 | Hum – I'm Because of Us | Devina Kapoor | | |
| 2026 | Heartbeats | Naina Verma | Season 2 | |

== Awards ==
| Year | Award | Category | Work | Result | Ref. |
|---|---|---|---|---|---|
| 2016 | Gold Awards | Best Debut – Female | Bahu Hamari Rajni Kant | Won | |
| 2021 | Iconic Gold Awards | Iconic Participant of the Year – Reality Show | Bigg Boss OTT | Won | |
