= Neha Saxena (TV actress) =

Indian actress

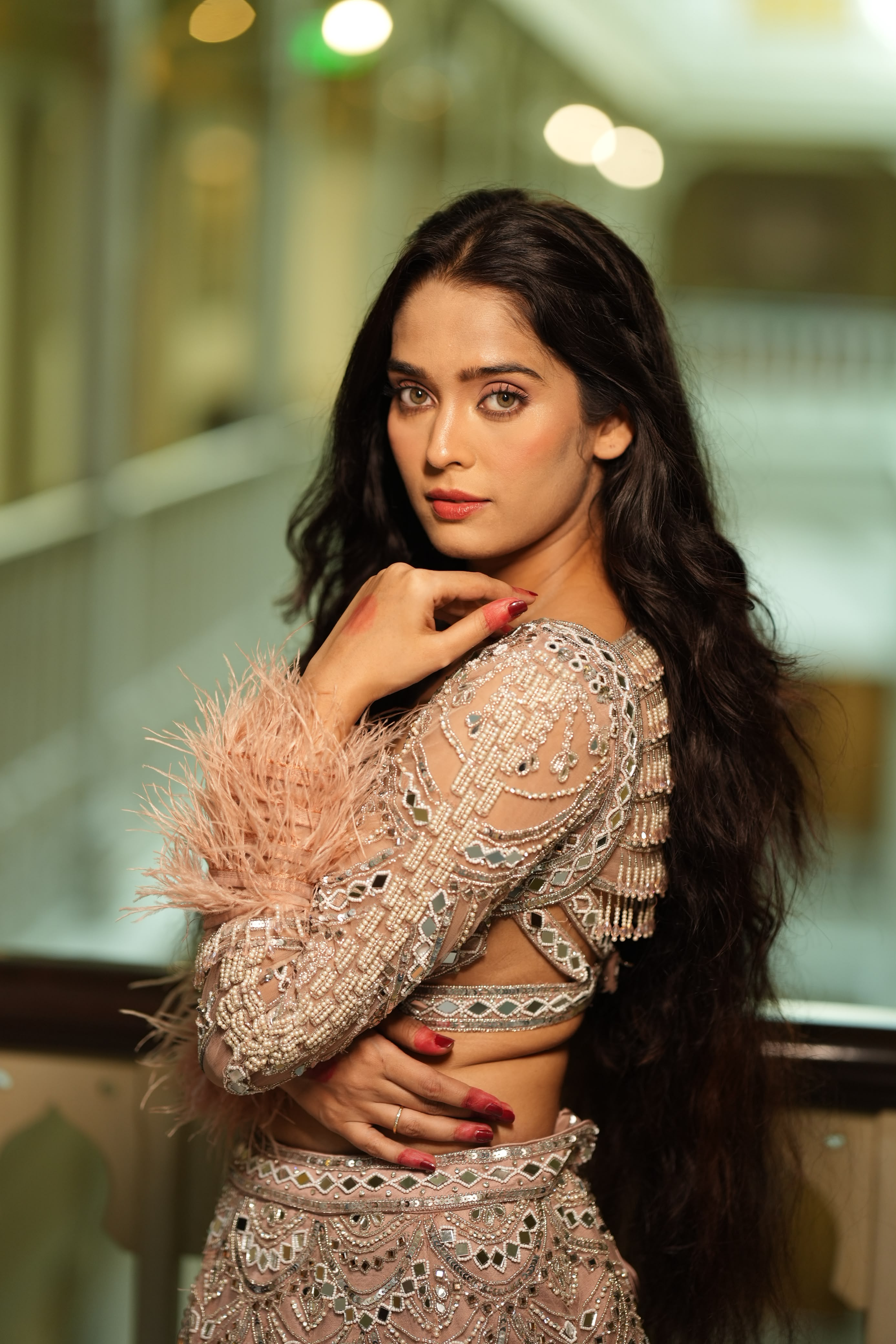
- Born: Neha Saxena
- Occupation: Actress
- Years active: 2009–2019
- Spouse: Shakti Arora (m. 2018)

Neha S Arora (née Saxena) is an Indian television actress. She is well known for portraying the character of Mauli Banerjee in Star Plus's show Tere Liye. She was also seen portraying the character of Siddhi in &TV's Siddhi Vinayak.

== Career ==
Neha Saxena began her acting career with a role in Sajan Ghar Jaana Hai, where she played Dhaani Ambar Raghuvanshi.

== Personal life ==
Saxena was in a long-term relationship with television actor Shakti Arora. The couple got married on 6 April 2018.

== Filmography ==
=== Television ===
Year	Title	Role	Notes	Ref.
2009–2010	Sajan Ghar Jaana Hai	Dhaani Ambar Raghuvanshi		
2010–2011	Tere Liye	Mauli Sharma Banerjee		
2010	Adaalat	Dr. Shyamali Wadhera	Episodic role	
2013	CID	Maya	Episodic role	
2015	Nach Baliye 7	Contestant	9th place	
2017	Pyaar Tune Kya Kiya	Kinjal	Season 2, Episodic role	
2017-2018	Siddhi Vinayak	Siddhi Joshi		
2019	Kitchen Champion	Herself	Guest	
