= Karishma Sharma =

Indian actress (born 1993)

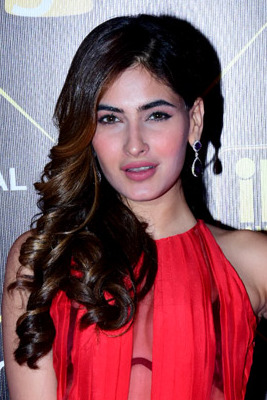
- Born: 22 December 1993 (age 32); Delhi, India
- Occupations: Actress; model
- Years active: 2013–present

Karishma Lala Sharma (born 22 December 1993) is an Indian actress and model known for portraying Ragini in Ragini MMS: Returns, Aaina in Ujda Chaman, Tina in Pyaar Ka Punchnama 2 and Isha in Hum – I'm Because of Us.

In 2025, Sharma appeared in the Hindi short film Lights, Camera, Lies, directed by Dinesh Sudarshan Soi. She played the role of Sonal opposite Achintya Rajawat. The film was released on 1 July 2025 and was made available on Amazon Prime Video and Shorts TV Network.

== Early life ==
Karishma Sharma born into a Brahmin family in Delhi. She also spend lots of time in Patna with her family. She moved to Mumbai in her teenage.

== Filmography ==
=== Films ===
Year	Title	Role	Notes	Ref.
2015	Pyaar Ka Punchnama 2	Tina		
2018	Hotel Milan	Shaheen		
2019	Fastey Fasaatey	Anisha		
2019	Super 30	Unnamed	Song: "Paisa"	
2019	Ujda Chaman	Aaina		
2022	Ek Villain Returns	Siya		

=== Short film ===
Year	Title	Role	Notes
2025	Lights, Camera, Lies	Sonal	Short film

=== Web series ===
Year	Title	Role	Ref.
2016	Life Sahi Hai	The Maid	
2017	Ragini MMS: Returns	Ragini	
2018	Hum – I'm Because of Us	Isha Kapoor	
2019	Fixerr	Aahana Khurrana	
2021	Sumer Singh Case Files: Girlfriends	Nirali	

=== Television ===
Year	Title	Role	Notes
2014	Pavitra Rishta	Pia Arjun Kirloskar	
2014	MTV Webbed	Ishika	
2014	Fear Files: Darr Ki Sacchi Tasvirein	Unnamed	Season 1; Episode 28
2014	Pyaar Tune Kya Kiya	Suheena	
2014	Ye Hai Mohabbatein	Raina	
2014	Love by Chance	Prachi	
2015	Aahat 6	Sonia	Episode 29
2015	Twist Wala Love: Fairy Tale Remixed	Unnamed	
2016	Silsila Pyar Ka	Munmun	
2017	Pyaar Tune Kya Kiya	Avni	
2018	Comedy Circus	Herself	
2019	The Kapil Sharma Show	Various	

=== Music videos ===
Year	Title	Singer	Ref.
2018	Tera Ghata	Gajendra Verma	
2019	Neendein	Sonal Pradhan	
2019	Kaash Aisa Hota	Darshan Raval	
2019	Kanta Bai	Tony Kakkar	
2020	Koi Aur Hai	Ankit Tiwari	
2020	Dil Na Todunga	Abhi Dutt	
2021	Barsaat Ki Dhun	Jubin Nautiyal	
2021	Dil Galti Kar Baitha Hai	Jubin Nautiyal	
2021	Azaad Hoon	Arun Singh	
2023	Pyar	Abdu Rozik	

== Personal life ==
Karishma Sharma is having a relationship with Abdul Rauf, a Flim Distributor from Mumbai. They both settled in Mumbai.
