= Dilnaz Irani =

Indian actress

- Born: Mumbai, Maharashtra, India
- Education: Electronic engineering St. Xaviers, Mumbai
- Occupation: Actress
- Years active: 2007–present
- Known for: Aligarh, Jodhaa Akbar

Dilnaz Irani is an Indian film, theatre and television actress. She started her Bollywood career as an actress in films such as 68 Pages and Jodhaa Akbar, and has appeared in the films Heroine in 2012 and Aligarh.

== Personal life ==
Dilnaz was born in Mumbai, Maharashtra to an Irani family. She completed her Electronics Engineering studies from Shah and Anchor Kutchi College of Engineering, Mumbai and has completed eight levels of the Trinity College London exam course and has also worked as a software engineer for four years.

== Acting and modelling ==
Dilnaz has acted in theatre plays and has been a ramp model, participated in a mega model contest, appeared in a music video and been a VJ for a music related show. Later, she has become a film, television and web actress with a main role as Kavita in the series Ragini MMS: Returns.

== Filmography ==
Year	Film	Role	Notes
2007	68 Pages	Neha	
2008	Jodhaa Akbar	Bibi Salima	
2012	Heroine	Tamanna	
2015	Aligarh	Nameeta	
2018	Sir	Nandita	
2023	Sukhee	Mansi Parekh	
2024	Chandu Champion	Nurse	

== Television ==
Year	Show	Role	Channel/Platform	Notes
2001	Ssshhhh...Koi Hai	Richa	Star Plus and Star One	Episode 1
2009	Kitani Mohabbat Hai	Lovedeep Ahluwalia	Imagine TV	
2011	Parvarrish – Kuchh Khattee Kuchh Meethi		Sony TV	
2012	I Luv My India	Vinny Sethi	SAB TV	
2014	V The Serial		Channel V India	
2016	I Don't Watch TV	Madam	Arré and YouTube	Webseries
2016	Badi Door Se Aaye Hain	Laxmi	SAB TV	
2017	Ragini MMS: Returns	Kavita	ALTBalaji and ZEE5	Webseries
2018	Twisted	Arunima	JioCinema	Webseries
2021	Aarya	Shefali Gupta	Disney+ Hotstar	Webseries
2021	Decoupled	Reema	Netflix	Webseries
2023	Mathagam	Sayanthika IPS	Disney+ Hotstar	Tamil Webseries
2024	Dil Dosti Dilemma	Nandini	prime video	
