= Sanaya Irani =

Indian actress (born 1983)

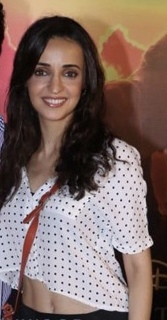
- Irani in 2016
- Born: 17 September 1983 (age 43); Mumbai, India
- Education: The Lawrence School, Lovedale; Sydenham College
- Occupation: Actress
- Years active: 2006-present
- Known for: Miley Jab Hum Tum; Iss Pyaar Ko Kya Naam Doon?
- Spouse: Mohit Sehgal (m. 2016)

Sanaya Irani (pronounced [səˈnaːjaː ɪˈɾaːni]; born 17 September 1983) is an Indian actress who primarily works in Hindi television. Irani is best known for her roles in Iss Pyaar Ko Kya Naam Doon? and Miley Jab Hum Tum. She also participated in Nach Baliye 8 and Jhalak Dikhhla Jaa 8.

== Early life and education ==
Irani was born on 17 September 1983 in Mumbai to an Irani (Zoroastrian) family. Irani spent seven years studying in The Lawrence School, Lovedale in Ooty. She graduated from Sydenham College of Commerce and Economics, Mumbai and was pursuing an MBA degree before becoming a model.

== Career ==
=== Modelling career and film debut (2005-2007) ===
Irani's first modelling portfolio was done by photographer-turned actor Boman Irani. Irani made her acting debut in the Yash Raj Film Fanaa (2006) as Mehbooba. The actress spent the year doing TV advertisements with Bollywood stars like Shahrukh Khan, Kareena Kapoor and others before entering television. She made her debut with Jagjit Singh's Tumko Dekha. At the beginning of her career, Irani wasn't fluent in Hindi and spoke of her struggles with the language on several occasions.

=== Television debut and breakthrough (2007-2010) ===
Her television debut was in the SAB TV drama Left Right Left (2007) as Cadet Sameera Shroff. She was tutored by her director for her Hindi. This was followed by a negative role in Radhaa Ki Betiyaan Kuch Kar Dikhayengi (2008) on Imagine TV.

Irani's first lead role as a protagonist was in STAR One's Miley Jab Hum Tum (2008–2010), as the simple, studious and reclusive Gunjan. Irani briefly hosted the second season of Zara Nachke Dikha on STAR Plus with boyfriend Mohit Sehgal (2010). She was also seen as a panel member in Meethi Chorii No. 1 opposite Ragini Khanna (2010).

=== Established actress (2011-2014) ===
She portrayed the bubbly and loving Khushi Kumari Gupta, the female protagonist of Iss Pyaar Ko Kya Naam Doon? (2011–2012) opposite Barun Sobti. The show, which aired its final episode on 30 November 2012, had consistently maintained its position as one of the top ten daily dramas on Indian general entertainment channels.

In early 2013, Irani hosted Zee TV's Valentine's Day special Ishq Wala Love opposite Karan Grover. She later appeared as a contestant in Welcome - Baazi Mehmaan-Nawaazi ki (2013), hosted by Ram Kapoor.

She played the role of a vivacious and modern girl in Chhanchhan (2013). The show was loosely based on the Hindi movie Khubsoorat. Irani then appeared in Rangrasiya (2014) as Parvati. The show was produced by Saurabh Tiwari, head of Tequila Shots Production. The story followed a border security personnel and an orphan girl who were ideologically different. It ended in September.

=== Jhalak Dikhhla Jaa and further success (2015-present) ===
Irani also participated in Jhalak Dikhhla Jaa 8 in 2015 which aired on Colors. Irani reprised her role of Khushi Kumari Gupta Singh Raizada again in its sequel mini series Iss Pyaar Ko Kya Naam Doon?... Ek Jashan (2015) which ended in December. In 2017, Irani participated in the dance show Nach Baliye 8 with her husband Mohit Sehgal. During Nach Baliye Sanaya & Mohit were in a controversy as fans of Divyanka Tripathi had claimed that they are the fixed winners but she lashed at the trollers on Instagram and said this is untrue.

=== Other appearances ===
In August 2013, Irani made a brief guest appearance in the dance show Jhalak Dikhhla Jaa to support her best friend Drashti Dhami. She made an appearance again in the seventh season of Jhalak Dikhhla Jaa to support Ashish Sharma in June 2014. In December 2013, Irani made a special guest appearance in Bigg Boss 7 in the grand finale along with Ashish Sharma, Preetika Rao and Harshad Arora. She also made special appearance in Beintehaa in March and June 2014.

== Personal life ==
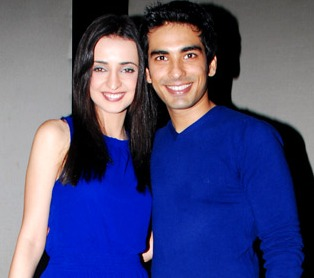
Irani with husband Sehgal

Irani met actor Mohit Sehgal on the sets of Miley Jab Hum Tum and they eventually began dating. They announced their relationship on 19 November 2010, the last day of the series shoot. In December 2015, the couple got engaged. Irani married Sehgal on 25 January 2016 in a traditional Hindu wedding ceremony in Goa.

== Media image ==
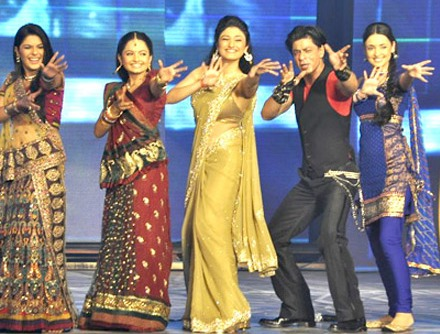
Irani at the music launch of Ra.One (2011) along with Shahrukh Khan and Pooja Gaur, Giaa Manek and Ragini Khanna

Eastern Eye placed her in their 50 Sexiest Asian Women list in 2012. In 2014, she was listed in the top 10 best television actresses by Rediff. In 2015, Sanaya became the only television actress to be listed on the People magazine's - India's 40 most beautiful women list. In 2018, The Times of India ranked her 10th in the "Top 10 TV Actress" list. In 2014, Irani went on a U.K. tour on behalf of Star Plus.

== Filmography ==
=== Films ===
Year	Title	Role	Notes	Ref.
2006	Fanaa	Mehbooba		
2018	Pihu	Pihu	Short film	
2018	Dum Dum Dumroo	Dr. Sneha	Short film	
2019	Ghost	Simran Singh		
2020	Ved and Arya	Arya	Short film	
2023	Butterflies Season 4	Safa	Short film (episode 5)	

=== Television ===
Year	Title	Role	Notes	Ref.
2007	Left Right Left	Cadet Sameera Shroff		
2007	Kasamh Se	Geet		
2008	Radhaa Ki Betiyaan Kuch Kar Dikhayengi	Sanaya		
2008	Kaho Na Yaar Hai	Contestant		
2008–2010	Miley Jab Hum Tum	Gunjan Bhushan		
2010	Zara Nachke Dikha 2	Host		
2010	Nachle Ve with Saroj Khan	Contestant		
2010	Meethi Choori No 1	Contestant		
2011–2012	Iss Pyaar Ko Kya Naam Doon?	Khushi Kumari Gupta Raizada		
2013	Ishq Wala Love	Host		
2013	Chhanchhan	Chhanchhan Sarabhai Borisagar		
2013	Welcome – Baazi Mehmaan Nawazi Ki	Contestant	Episodes 1–6	
2013–2014	Rangrasiya	Parvati Chauhan Ranawat/ Myrah Mehra		
2015	Jhalak Dikhhla Jaa 8	Contestant	1st runner-up	
2016	Box Cricket League 2	Contestant	Team: Mumbai Tigers	
2017	Nach Baliye 8	Contestant	2nd runner-up	

==== Special appearances ====
Year	Title	Role	Ref.
2013	Masterchef - Kitchen Ke Superstars	Herself	
2013	Jhalak Dikhhla Jaa 6	Herself	
2013	Bigg Boss 7	Herself	
2014	Jhalak Dikhhla Jaa 7	Herself	
2015	Aaj Ki Raat Hai Zindagi	Herself	
2018	India's Next Superstars	Herself	
2019	Kitchen Champion 5	Herself	
2019	Khatra Khatra Khatra	Herself	
2019	Nach Baliye 9	Herself	

=== Web series ===
Year	Title	Role	Notes	Ref.
2015	Iss Pyaar Ko Kya Naam Doon? Ek Jashn	Khushi Kumari Gupta		
2016	I Don't Watch TV	Herself		
2018	Zindabaad	Sara Sayed	Mini-series	
2022	Cyber Vaar – Har Screen Crime Scene	Ananya Saini		

=== Music videos ===
Year	Title	Singer(s)	Ref.
2006	Mere Naseeb Mein Tu Hai		
2006	Tumko Dekha To Yeh(remix)	Jagjit Singh	
2012	Kulli Wichon Ni Yaar Labh Lai	Joshilay	Punjabi song (Saregama Punjabi-YouTube)
2018	Main Jaandiyaan	Neha Bhasin, Piyush Mehroliyaa	
2019	Intezaar	Asees Kaur, Arijit Singh	
2022	Dholna	Deedar Kaur	

== Accolades ==
Year	Award	Category	Work	Result	Ref.
2008	Indian Television Academy Awards	Gr8! Performer Of The Year - Female	Miley Jab Hum Tum	Won	
2012	Gold Awards	Face of the year	Iss Pyaar Ko Kya Naam Doon?	Won	
2012	Gold Awards	Best Onscreen Jodi (with Barun Sobti)	Iss Pyaar Ko Kya Naam Doon?	Won	
2012	Indian Television Academy Awards	Best Actress (Popular)	Iss Pyaar Ko Kya Naam Doon?	Nominated	
2012	People's Choice Awards India	Favorite Onscreen Couple (with Barun Sobti)	Iss Pyaar Ko Kya Naam Doon?	Won	
2012	Indian Telly Awards	Best Onscreen Couple (with Barun Sobti)	Iss Pyaar Ko Kya Naam Doon?	Won	
2013	Indian Telly Awards	Best Actress in a Lead Role	Iss Pyaar Ko Kya Naam Doon?	Nominated	
2013	Gold Awards	Best Actress in a Lead Role	Iss Pyaar Ko Kya Naam Doon?	Nominated	
2013	Gold Awards	Face of the Year	Chhanchhan	Won	
2014	Indian Telly Awards	Best Actress in a Lead Role	Rangrasiya	Nominated	
2014	Asian Viewers Television Awards	Female Actor Of The Year	Rangrasiya	Won	
2014	Indian Television Academy Awards	Best Actress (Popular)	Rangrasiya	Nominated	
2014	Gold Awards	Best Actress in a Lead Role	Rangrasiya	Nominated	
2015	Asian Viewers Television Awards	Female Actor Of The Year	Rangrasiya	Nominated	

== See also ==
- List of Indian television actresses
- List of Hindi television actresses
