= Miley Jab Hum Tum =

2008 Indian television series

- Genre: Teen drama
- Written by: Jay Verma
- Directed by: Ravi Bhushan; Nissar Parvej; Maanav Singh; Mukta Dhond; Sundeep Sharma
- Creative directors: Richa Yamini; Animesh Verma; Bhawna Bundela; Avhiroop Mazzumdar; Shabia Ravi Walia; Jyoti Tandon; Prangshu P Ghosh; Poornima Shettygar; Sankalp
- Starring: Mohit Sehgal; Arjun Bijlani; Rati Pandey; Sanaya Irani
- Music by: Shaleen Sharma; Hitesh Kewalya
- Opening theme: "Miley Jab Hum Tum" by Suraj Jagan & Mahalakshmi Iyer
- Country of origin: India
- Original language: Hindi
- No. of seasons: 2
- No. of episodes: 526

Production
- Executive producer: Sushmitha Shetty
- Producers: Seema Sharma; Sudhir Sharma
- Cinematography: Hrishikesh Gandhi; Abhishek Gandhi
- Editors: Ganga Kacharla; Sagar Nighojkar; Jaskaran Singh; Rajanikant Malviya
- Running time: 22 minutes
- Production companies: Endemol India; Sunshine Productions

Original release
- Network: STAR One
- Release: 22 September 2008 – 19 November 2010

Miley Jab Hum Tum (transl. When You and I Met) is an Indian Hindi-language teen drama television series that aired on Star One from 22 September 2008 to 19 November 2010. It is digitally available on Disney+ Hotstar. Produced by Sudhir Sharma and Seema Sharma under Endemol India and Sunshine Productions, the series depicts themes of falling in love during college and building lifelong relationships. It starred Mohit Sehgal, Sanaya Irani, Rati Pandey, and Arjun Bijlani.

== Plot ==
The story begins at Excel College, introducing basketball champion Samrat Shergill (Mohit Sehgal), college diva Dia Bhushan (Navina Bole), their friends Benji Swami (Abhishek Sharma) and Uday Bhushan (Jaskaran Gandhi), studious sisters Nupur Bhushan (Rati Pandey) and Gunjan Bhushan (Sanaya Irani), and academically inclined Mayank Sharma (Arjun Bijlani). Nupur is fashion-conscious and carefree, while Gunjan is introverted, responsible, and focused on her studies. Initially, the sisters face competition from their cousin Dia, who is jealous of them, but they eventually become close. Nupur and Mayank frequently argue, but over time they fall in love and get married. Gunjan and Samrat develop a friendship that leads to romance, and later on get engaged.

Mayank and Nupur later decide to move to the United States. On their way to the airport with Gunjan and Samrat, the group is involved in a serious accident.

=== Three years later ===
In the aftermath of the accident, the group is separated, Nupur is presumed dead, and Samrat js blamed for the accident. Mayank is devastated. Samrat and Gunjan end their engagement and part ways. It is later revealed that Nupur's obsessive admirer, Dhruv Verma (Rohit Khurana), was responsible for the accident, and that Nupur is alive. After Dhruv is brought to justice, Nupur reunites with Mayank. The series concludes with Samrat and Gunjan getting married, and Mayank and Nupur becoming parents to twin boys.

== Cast ==
=== Main ===
Main cast
  - Arjun Bijlani as Mayank Sharma – Shilpa's son; Nupur's husband
  - Rati Pandey as Nupur Bhushan Sharma – Shashi's daughter; Gunjan's elder sister; Mayank’s wife
  - Mohit Sehgal as Samrat Shergill – Suhaani's elder brother; Gunjan's husband
  - Sanaya Irani as Gunjan Bhushan Shergill – Shashi's daughter; Nupur's younger sister; Samrat's wife

=== Recurring ===
Recurring cast
  - Navina Bole as Dia Bhushan – Ravi's daughter; sister of Nupur, Gunjan, and Uday; Benjamin's love interest
  - Jaskaran Gandhi as Uday Bhushan – Ravi's son; brother of Dia, Nupur, and Gunjan
  - Abhishek Sharma as Benjamin "Benji" Swami – Samrat's best friend; Dia's love interest
  - Nishant Singh Malkani as Adhiraj "Adi" – Suhaani's love interest
  - Anupriya Kapoor as Suhaani Shergill – Indrani's daughter; Samrat's sister; Adhiraj's love interest
  - Shraddha Musale as CJ
  - Kishwer Merchant as Tamanna Seth – Drama teacher
  - Khushank Arora as Ranvijay Rathore
  - Preeti Keswani as Sheena Malhotra
  - Sumeet Soni as Purab Verma – Samrat's friend
  - Sreejita De as Ashwini "Ash" – Gunjan's student and namesake sister; Rohan's love interest
  - Nikhil Chaddha as Rohan Singhal – Ashwini's love interest
  - Kriti Sharma as Ria Singhal
  - Meer Ali as Nirbhay Awasthi
  - Vaishnavi Mahant as Shilpa Sharma
  - Shishir Sharma / Anang Desai as Shashi Bhushan – Ravi's brother; father of Nupur and Gunjan
  - Gireesh Sahdev as Ravi Bhushan – Shashi's brother; father of Dia and Uday
  - Jaanvi Sangwan as Ratna Bhushan – Aunt of Nupur, Gunjan, Dia, and Uday
  - Mahru Sheikh as Indrani Shergill
  - Akruti Singh as Chinky – Cousin of Nupur, Gunjan, Dia, and Uday
  - Deepak Pareek as Professor Shukla
  - Jaineeraj Rajpurohit as Mr. Saxena – Principal of Excel College
  - Amit Jain as Neileswar "Neil" Oberoi – Gunjan's childhood friend
  - Melissa Pais as Aha Chand
  - Abhinav Kapoor as Yash Devraj
  - Imran Khan as JD
  - Latesh Sharma as Luv
  - Manasvi Vyas as Aparajita Mehta
  - Tanvi Thakkar as Ishika
  - Neelam Bhagchandani as Vidushi
  - Perneet Chauhan as Riya Saxena
  - Sudhir Sharma as Lucky / Chunky Mishra
  - Gautam Hegde as Chironji Jajotia
  - Sachin Nayak as Chinu
  - Bakhtiyaar Irani as D4
  - Tannaz Irani as Tanya
  - Dinesh Mehta as Guru

=== Guest appearances ===
Guest appearances
  - Rohit Khurana as Dhruv Verma – Nupur's obsessive admirer
  - Karan Singh Grover as Dr. Armaan Malik (Dill Mill Gayye)
  - Shilpa Anand as Dr. Shilpa Malhotra (Dill Mill Gayye)
  - Karan Wahi as Dr. Siddhant Modi (Dill Mill Gayye)
  - Drashti Dhami as Geet Maan Singh Khurana (Geet – Hui Sabse Parayi)
  - Gurmeet Choudhary as Maan Singh Khurana (Geet – Hui Sabse Parayi)
  - Sidharth Shukla as Veer Vardhan Singh (Jaane Pehchaane Se... Ye Ajnabbi)

== Production ==
=== Development ===
Miley Jab Hum Tum was produced under Endemol India and Sunshine Productions by Sudhir Sharma and Seema Sharma. The series narrates the story of two sisters, their move to a metropolitan city, their experiences of falling in love during college, and the development of lifelong relationships.

In 2010, the series took a three-year leap, following which new characters were introduced. Producer Sudhir Sharma stated, "We've done almost 400 episodes and now I feel that we need to revamp it to bring back the enthusiasm we had when we first started. We want the youth to be able to connect with the show. I wouldn't say that the audience is bored, but as a precaution, it's better if we give them something fresh."

=== Casting ===
Rati Pandey and Sanaya Irani were cast as the lead sisters, Nupur and Gunjan, respectively. Arjun Bijlani and Mohit Sehgal were cast opposite them as the male leads, Mayank and Samrat. The role of Samrat marked Sehgal's acting debut. Rohit Khurana was cast in a cameo role as Dhruv, Nupur's obsessive admirer.

In 2010, Pandey exited the series following her character's on-screen death before the leap. She rejoined the cast a few months later, after the TRP ratings declined in her absence.

=== Filming ===
The series is primarily set in Mumbai. Some portions depicting Excel College were filmed at Sophia College for Women, Mumbai. Additional scenes were shot at Kanjurmarg.

== Reception ==
=== Critical reception ===
Miley Jab Hum Tum is regarded as one of the most popular youth and college dramas. It received positive reviews from both critics and audiences. Raya Mehnaz of The Daily Star observed that the series became a fan favourite due to its "college setting and engaging storylines," adding that the show, "while adhering to the western tropes common in coming-of-age stories set in college, also subverted these tropes in uncommon ways."

The Times of India included Rati Pandey and Arjun Bijlani in its list of "Evergreen Romantic Couples," noting that Nupur and Mayank's compelling on-screen chemistry elevated the show to new heights.

=== Ratings ===
Miley Jab Hum Tum was the number one show on Star One between 2008 and 2009, frequently topping the TRP charts.

== Soundtrack ==
Miley Jab Hum Tum Original Sound Track

Soundtrack album by Shaleen Sharma
- Released: 22 September 2008
- Genres: Romance; Soundtrack
- Length: 1:20
- Language: Hindi
- Label: Star India
- Producers: Sudhir Sharma; Seema Sharma

The title track of Miley Jab Hum Tum was composed by Shaleen Sharma and performed by Suraj Jagan and Mahalakshmi Iyer.

Miley Jab Hum Tum: Tracklisting
No.	Title	Artist	Length
1.	"Miley Jab Hum Tum" (Duet)	Suraj Jagan, Mahalakshmi Iyer	1:20
2.	"Kya Hua Yeh" (Solo)	Mahalakshmi Iyer	2:45

== Awards and nominations ==
Year	Award	Category	Recipient	Result	Ref.
2008	Indian Television Academy Awards	Gr8! Performer Of The Year - Female	Sanaya Irani	Won	
