= Indian Telly Award for Fresh New Face – Male =

- Country: India
- Presented by: IndianTelevision.com
- First award: 2004
- Website: Indian Telly Awards

Indian Telly Award for Fresh New Face – Male is an award given by Indiantelevision.com as part of its annual Indian Telly Awards for TV serials.

== List of winners ==
=== 2000s ===
- 2001 Not Awarded
- 2002 Not Awarded
- 2003 Not Awarded
- 2004 Rajeev Khandelwal – Kahiin To Hoga as Sujal
  - Apoorva Agnihotri – Jassi Jaissi Koi Nahin
  - Akashdeep Saigal – Kyunki Saas Bhi Kabhi Bahu Thi as Ansh
  - Chetan Hansraj – Kkusum as Garv
  - Eijaz Khan – Kahiin To Hoga as Varun
- 2005 Iqbal Khan – Kaisa Ye Pyar Hai as Angad
  - Gurpreet Singh – Kahin To Hoga as Tushar
  - Pawan Shankar – Siddhanth as Siddhanth
  - Bakhtiyaar Irani – Batliwala House No.43 as Shahrukh
  - Ajay Gehi – Miilee as Rahul
- 2006 Pulkit Samrat – Kyunki Saas Bhi Kabhi Bahu Thi as Lakshya
  - Naman Shaw – Kasamh Se as Pushkar
  - Indraneil Sengupta – Pyaar Ke Do Naam: Ek Raadha, Ek Shyaam as Shyam
  - Vikas Manaktala – Left Right Left as Hooda
  - Arjun Bijlani – Left Right Left as Alekh
- 2007 Jay Bhanushali – Kayamath as Neev
  - Sharad Malhotra – Banoo Main Teri Dulhann as Sagar Singh
  - Ajay Singh Chaudhary – Love Story as Dev
  - Romit Raj – Ghar Ki Lakshmi Betiyaan as Yuvraj Garodia
- 2008 Angad Hasija – Sapna Babul Ka...Bidaai as Alekh
  - Kinshuk Mahajan – Sapna Babul Ka...Bidaai as Ranveer
  - Karan Hukku – Kasamh Se as Daksh
  - Saurabh Pandey – Jiya Jale as Chandan
  - Sushant Singh Rajput – Kis Desh Mein Hai Meraa Dil Preet Juneja
  - Vikrant Massey – Dharamveer as Dharam
- 2009 Avinash Sachdev – Chotti Bahu as Dev
  - Pankaj Singh Tiwari – Shree as Hari
  - Karan Kundra – Kitani Mohabbat Hai as Arjun Punj
  - Karan Mehra – Yeh Rishta Kya Kehlata Hai as Naitik
  - Kunal Verma – Tujh Sang Preet Lagai Sajna as Yug

=== 2010s ===
- 2010 Kavi Shastri – Rishta.Com as Rohan Mehra
  - Shashank Vyas – Balika Vadhu as Jagdish
  - Rahul Bagga – Powder as Mahindra Ranade
  - Abhishek Tiwari – Chand Chupa Badal Mein as Siddharth Sood
  - Mohit Malhotra – Mitwa Phool Kamal Ke as Birju
- 2011 Not Awarded
- 2012 Kushal Tandon – Ek Hazaaron Mein Meri Behna Hai as Virat Singh Vadhera
  - Gaurav S Bajaj – Sapnon Se Bhare Naina as Daksh Patwardhan
  - Ashish Kapoor – Dekha Ek Khwab as Yuvraj Rajkumar Udayveer Singh
  - Sumit Vats – Hitler Didi as Rishi
  - Sujay Reu – Ram Milaye Jodi as Anukalp Gandhi
- 2013 Nakuul Mehta – Pyaar Ka Dard Hai Meetha Meetha Pyaara Pyaara as Aditya Harish Kumar (Adi)
  - Kunwar Amar – Dil Dosti Dance as Reyansh Singhania (Rey
  - Mudit Nayar – Anamika as Jeet Pratap Saluja (Anamika)
  - Shaleen Malhotra – Har Yug Mein Ayega Ek -Arjun as Arjun Suryakant Raute
  - Nishad Vaidya – Amita Ka Amit as Amit Shah
- 2014 Harshad Arora – Beintehaa as Zain Osman Abdullah
  - Mishkat Varma – Aur Pyaar Ho Gaya as Raj Purohit
  - Shivin Narang – Ek Veer Ki Ardaas...Veera as Ranvijay Sampooran Singh
  - Vishal Vashishta – Ek Veer Ki Ardaas...Veera as Baldev Balwant Singh
  - Himanshu Soni – Buddha as Buddha
- 2015 Priyansh Jora – Tu Mera Hero as Ashish ''Titu'' Agarwal
- 2019 Adnan Khan – Ishq Subhan Allah as Kabeer Ahmed

=== 2020s ===
- 2023 Abhiskek Pathania – Kismat Ki Lakiro Se as Abhay Tripathi
- 2025 Shivendraa Om Saainiyol - Pushpa Impossible
