= Rubina Shergill =

Indian actress

- Born: 11 November 1982; Chandigarh, Punjab, India
- Died: 12 January 2012 (aged 29); Mumbai, India
- Occupation: Television actress

Rubina Shergill was an Indian television actress. She was known for her performance in the role of "Inspector Simran Kaushik" in Zee TV's daily soap Mrs. Kaushik Ki Paanch Bahuein, which eventually became her last show.

== Early life ==
Shergill was born and brought up in Chandigarh, Punjab. She did her schooling from Kendriya Vidyalaya Sector 31 Chandigarh and then graduated from MCM DAV College for Women, Chandigarh. She took lessons to become a professional singer, but soon realized that singing wasn't meant for her and she really should not pursue it. So, Shergill dropped all her ambition of becoming a singer.

== Career ==
Shergill's parents did not approve of her choosing acting as a career. However, she accompanied her mother, who was on a posting to Mumbai and started working on TV. She didn’t have to struggle hard to get into television. She visited a friend in Mumbai, met a few people and got work.

She worked in Rehna Hai Teri Palkon Ki Chhaon Mein on NDTV Imagine and one other serial before landing a role in Mrs. Kaushik Ki Paanch Bahuein on Zee TV in 2011. She played the role of "Inspector Simran Kaushik", third daughter-in-law of "Mrs Kaushik" (played by Vibha Chibber). Shergill said in an interview, "I feel fortunate to play a cop as well as a daughter-in-law as this gives me an opportunity to prove my mettle as an actor".

== Death ==
Shergill suffered a severe asthma attack during a party thrown by the production house of Mrs Kaushik Ki Paanch Bahuein on 23 December 2011 at a Mumbai-based five-star hotel. She did not have her asthma pump with her to inhale when she got the attack, and lost consciousness. She was then immediately admitted to the hospital.

"If death meant just leaving the stage long enough to change costume and come back as a new character....... would u slow down? or speed up?
I guess…...well I would not change my speed one bit…. I am loving what I am playing…"

— Rubina's Facebook status she posted on 4 August 2011.

A few days later the reports of Shergill's suffering from a brain hemorrhage were released. She was on ventilator support after slipping into a coma. She died on 12 January 2012, in Kokilaben Hospital in Andheri West, Mumbai. She was cremated at the Oshiwara Cremations Ground in Mumbai on 13 January 2012.

=== Tribute ===
After her death, Shergill was not replaced by any other actress in Mrs Kaushik Ki Paanch Bahuein which was on-air when she died. At the time of her death, her character of "Simran" in the show was written as having gone for training. The script was originally written to have her return; however, after Shergill's death, the script was re-written to have Simran die as well.

Even after Shergill's death, the character of "Simran Kaushik" was shown during flashbacks and retrieved many times in the show which finally ended on 15 March 2013.

== Television ==
Year	Serial	Character	Channel	Notes
2009-10	Rehna Hai Teri Palkon Ki Chhaon Mein	Guddi	NDTV Imagine	Supporting role
2011	Mrs. Kaushik Ki Paanch Bahuein	Inspector Simran Kaushik	Zee TV	Parallel Lead role

== Awards and nominations ==
Year	Award Ceremony	Category	Work	Result	Notes
2011	Zee Rishtey Awards	Favourite Bhabhi	Mrs. Kaushik Ki Paanch Bahuein	Won	with Gunn Kansara, Swati Bajpai, Deeya Chopra & Ragini Nandwani
2011	Zee Rishtey Awards	Favourite Saas Bahu	Mrs. Kaushik Ki Paanch Bahuein	Nominated	with Vibha Chibber, Gunn Kansara, Swati Bajpai, Deeya Chopra & Ragini Nandwani

== See also ==
- Mrs. Kaushik Ki Paanch Bahuein
- List of people from Punjab
