= Rehna Hai Teri Palkon Ki Chhaon Mein =

Indian drama television series

- Also known as: Palkon Ki Chhaon Mein
- Genre: Drama; Romance
- Directed by: Pawan Kumar
- Starring: Shoaib Ibrahim; Amrapali Dubey; Sumeet Vyas
- Theme music composer: Yogesh Vikrant
- Opening theme: "Palkon Ki Chhaon Mein" by Alka Yagnik
- Country of origin: India
- Original language: Hindi
- No. of episodes: 267

Production
- Producers: Rashmi Sharma; Pawan Kumar Marut
- Running time: 24 minutes
- Production company: Rashmi Sharma Telefilms Limited

Original release
- Network: NDTV Imagine
- Release: 17 August 2009 – 17 September 2010

Rehna Hai Teri Palkon Ki Chhaon Mein is an Indian soap opera that aired on Imagine TV in India between August 2009 and September 2010. It is a story of an orphan girl, Suman, who wants to be part of a joint family and soon gets a chance.

The second season of the series, Palkon Ki Chhaon Mein 2 on Dangal. It stars Trupti Mishra, Vin Rana and Ashish Dixit.

== Plot ==
This is the story of a young orphaned woman, whose dreams of finding family and love come true when she gets a chance to be a part of an extremely lovable and traditional joint family.

Suman lives in a girls' hostel with her best friend Kanchan, who hails from a rich, traditional and loving family. Kanchan's mother Kadambari meets Suman and decides that this girl will be her future daughter-in-law. Suman meets Kadambari's son Karan and they take a sudden liking for each other. To Suman's shock, it is revealed that she has been chosen for Kartik, Karan's elder brother. Suman is in a dilemma: She has to choose between her love for Karan and the feelings of a family which has treated her like a daughter.

After facing many difficulties, Karan and Suman get married. On the way to their honeymoon, the brakes on their car fail. Karan shoves Suman out but is unable to get out himself. The car dives into a waterfall and Karan is presumed dead. After that, the whole family begins to hate Suman, except for Karthik and his new fiancée Nandini. But even Nandini becomes an enemy when she sees that Kartik cares for Suman. Kartik marries Nandini. But their marriage breaks up when Nandini's evil nature is exposed before the whole family.

Meanwhile, Suman goes through many trials and tribulations. After a long time, she is once again accepted by her in-laws. By now, she and Kartik are in love. They get married with the blessings of the family. Just then, Karan returns, alive. When he learns about Suman's re-marriage with Kartik, he is angered. He tries to divide them but fails. Later, Karan marries a young woman named Paro and is happy with her.

Fate plays another trick on Suman. A young widow, Niharika, who is related to Suman's father-in-law, comes to stay with the family. Niharika is attracted to Kartik. Niharika makes it appear that Kartik has outraged her modesty under the influence of a drug. Then Niharika pretends to be expecting his child. Kartik is forced to promise that he will marry Niharika. Niharika kidnaps Suman and kills her. Suman's spirit returns, however, and exposes Niharika before leaving the world. Kartik and his family are heartbroken at losing Suman. A few years later, there is another Suman in the family – Karan and Paro's little daughter. But the vacuum in Kartik's life remains unfilled.

== Cast ==
- Amrapali Dubey as Suman Kartik Pratapsingh: Karan's ex–wife; Kartik's wife (2009–2010)
- Sumeet Vyas as Kartik Pratapsingh: Karan and Kanchan's elder brother; Nandini's ex–husband; Suman's widower (2009–2010)
- Shoaib Ibrahim as Karan Pratapsingh: Kartik's younger and Kanchan's elder brother; Suman's ex–husband; Paro's husband; Baby Suman's father (2009–2010)
- Indira Krishnan as Kadambari
- Madhuri Dikshit as Chandrika
- Garima Jain as Ruby
- Payal Shukla as Kanchan Pratapsingh: Kadambari's daughter; Kartik and Karan's younger sister (2009–2010)
- Sunayana Fozdar as Nandini Kartik Pratapsingh: Kartik's ex–wife (2009–2010)
- Rahul Trivedi as shyambahadur
- Aayam Mehta as Devendra Singh
- Sharmilee Raj as Vidya
- Rubina Shergill as Guddi
- Manish Naggdev as Tanmay
- Shweta Rastogi as Paro Karan Pratapsingh: Karan's wife; Baby Suman's mother (2010)
- Shriya Bisht as Niharika: Kartik's one sided obsessive lover; Suman's murderer (2010)
