= Kamala Nagar =

Kamala Nagar may refer to these places in India named after Kamala Nehru:

- Kamala Nagar, Bangalore
- Kamala Nagar, Hyderabad
- Kamalanagar, Mizoram
- Kamla Nagar, New Delhi
- Kamla Nagar, Agra
