= Vishal Nayak =

Indian television actor

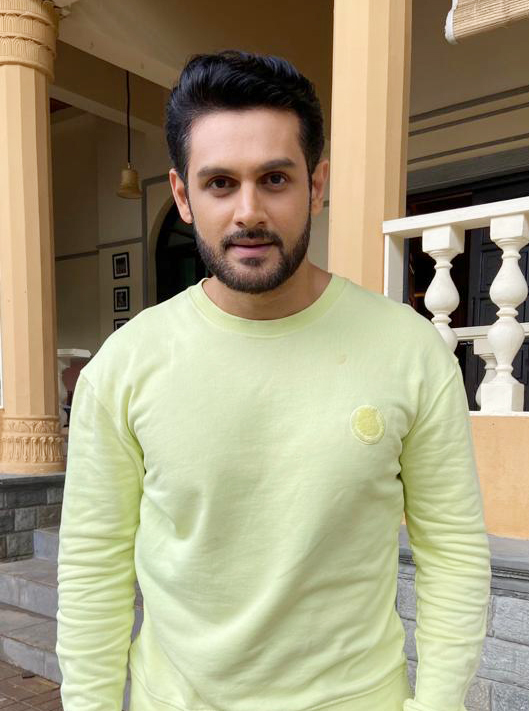
- Nayak in 2023
- Born: Mumbai
- Education: Master in Marketing Management
- Occupation: Actor
- Years active: 2009–present
- Spouse: Preet Kaur Nayak (m. 2011)
- Children: 1

Vishal Nayak is an Indian television actor. He has appeared in the shows Qubool Hai, Parshuram and film Second Marriage Dot Com.

== Personal life ==
Vishal married Preet Kaur Nayak in 2011 and they have a daughter.

== Career ==
He started his career with the TV Series Bayttaab Dil Kee Tamanna Hai. Later, he appeared in Preet Se Bandhi Ye Dori Ram Milaayi Jodi, CID, and Kehta Hai Dil Jee Le Zara. In 2012, he got his first break in films, playing the main character of Akshay Narang in Second Marriage Dot Com. Alongside this, he played supporting roles in television serials such as Fear Files: Darr Ki Sacchi Tasvirein, Qubool Hai, Sasural Simar Ka.

Nayak had his breakthrough with the role of Manish Agarwal in Ghar Ek Mandir Kripa Agrasen Maharaj Ki. He also appeared in the shows Parshuram and Palkon Ki Chhaon Mein 2, which became the biggest hit of his television career. In 2021, he made his web series debut in Qubool Hai 2.0 as a RAW agent. From February to June 2023, he played the role of Vikram Oberoi in Tere Ishq Mein Ghayal

== Filmography ==
=== Television ===
Year	Serial	Role	Notes
2009	Bayttaab Dil Kee Tamanna Hai		
2010	Preet Se Bandhi Ye Dori Ram Milaayi Jodi	Parmeet	
2010–2017	CID	Vedant/Raj/Harsh	Supporting Role
2012	Har Yug Mein Aayega Ek - Arjun		
2012	Savdhaan India	Tarun/Rahul	
2012	Hum Ne Li Hai... Shapath		
2013	Crime Patrol	Prasanjit/Rabi	
2013	Fear Files: Darr Ki Sacchi Tasvirein		
2013	Kehta Hai Dil Jee Le Zara	Shivam	
2013–2014	Qubool Hai	Farhan Qureshi	
2014	Encounter	Anand Murthy	
2014	Humsafars	Siraj Azeem Chaudhary	
2015	Dil Ki Baatein Dil Hi Jaane		
2015–2017	Sasural Simar Ka	Shailendra Bhardwaj	
2016	Karmaphal Daata Shani	Pawandev	
2018	Mahakali — Anth Hi Aarambh Hai	Agnidev	
2018	Chandragupta Maurya	Chandravardhan Maurya	
2019	Faatima		Short film
2021–2022	Ghar Ek Mandir Kripa Agrasen Maharaj Ki	Manish Agarwal	Lead Role
2022	Parshuram	Shiv	Lead Role
2022	Palkon Ki Chhaon Mein 2	Sirish Bharadwaj	
2023	Tere Ishq Mein Ghayal	Vikram Oberoi	
2023–2024	Baatein Kuch Ankahee Si	Hemant Karmarkar	
2025	Kyunki Saas Bhi Kabhi Bahu Thi 2	Vikram	
2026	Jhanak	Dr. Surjeet Chatterjee	

=== Films ===
Year	Title	Role	Notes	Ref.
2012	Second Marriage Dot Com	Akshay Narang		

=== Web series ===
Year	Title	Role	Notes	Ref.
2021	Qubool Hai 2.0	RAW agent		
2024	Raisinghani vs Raisinghani	Rahul Pandey		
