= Preet Kaur =

Preet Kaur may refer to:

- Preet Kaur Gill, British politician serving as Member of Parliament (MP) for Birmingham Edgbaston
- Preet Kaur Nayak, Indian television actress
