= Sujay Reu =

Indian actor

- Born: 6 June 1989 (age 37); Mumbai, Maharashtra, India
- Occupation: Actor
- Years active: 2011–present
- Known for: Ram Milaayi Jodi; Alaxmi Ka Super Parivaar; Siya Ke Ram; Shrimad Ramayan

Sujay Reu (born 6 June 1989) is an Indian actor who mainly works in Hindi television. Reu made his acting debut with Ram Milaayi Jodi, playing Anukalp Gandhi. He is best known for his portrayal of Kishan Kapadia in Alaxmi Ka Super Parivaar and Bharata in Siya Ke Ram. Reu earned wider recognition with his portrayal of Rama / Vishnu in Shrimad Ramayan.

Sujay Reu's native is Kashmir. He is born and brought up in Mumbai, Maharashtra, India. He has an older sister. He is a trained dancer. He did engineering before getting into acting. He loves reading murder mysteries and books from authors like Agatha Christie.

== Career ==
Reu made his acting debut in 2011, with Preet Se Bandhi Ye Dori Ram Milaayi Jodi, portraying Anukalp Gandhi opposite Sara Khan. For his performance, he received Indian Telly Award for Fresh New Face - Male nomination.

From 2012 to 2013, he played Kishan Kapadia, opposite Helly Shah in Alaxmi Ka Super Parivaar. Then, Reu portrayed Rohan Pandey in Shastri Sisters, opposite Neha Pednekar.

Reu portrayed Bharata opposite Prithvi Hatte in Siya Ke Ram, from 2015 to 2016. From 2018 to 2019, he portrayed Kartik in Tantra.

From 2021 to 2022, Reu portrayed Vishnu in Baal Shiv – Mahadev Ki Andekhi Gatha, opposite Vandana Rao and Deepika Upadhyay. In 2023, he portrayed Manvendra "Maan" Barot in Hum Rahein Na Rahein Hum.

Starting in January 2024 Reu portrayed Rama / Vishnu in Shrimad Ramayan opposite Prachi Bansal. The show proved to be a turning point in his career and gained him appreciation.

== Filmography ==
=== Television ===
Year	Title	Role	Notes	Ref.
2011-2012	Preet Se Bandhi Ye Dori Ram Milaayi Jodi	Anukalp Gandhi	Debut (E. 204)	
2012-2013	Alaxmi Ka Super Parivaar	Kishan Kapadia		
2014-2015	Shastri Sisters	Rohan Pandey		
2015-2016	Siya Ke Ram	Bharata		
2018-2019	Tantra	Kartik		
2021-2022	Baal Shiv – Mahadev Ki Andekhi Gatha	Vishnu		
2023	Hum Rahein Na Rahein Hum	Manvendra Singh Barot "Maan"		
2024–2025	Shrimad Ramayan	Rama / Vishnu		

== Awards and nominations ==
Year	Award	Category	Work	Result	Ref.
2012	Indian Telly Awards	Fresh New Face – Male	Ram Milaayi Jodi	Nominated	
