= Ram Barat =

Annual event in North India

Ram Barat (Hindi: राम बारात) is a part of the Ramlila celebration in Agra, India. It is one of the biggest annual events in North India. Ram Barat literally means "Baraat (marriage procession) of Shri Ram". Every year a new locality is chosen in Agra and is elaborately decorated with lights and flowers for Janakpuri . The area is given a major facelift befitting the venue for the divine marriage.

== History ==
The history of Ram Barat is said to go back around 125 years, when Lala Kokamal, a reputed business man, started the tradition of three days of festivities, revolving around the royal wedding. His influence has been so great on this festival that the road from where the Baraat proceeds has been named 'Lala Kokamal Marg', and the grounds where Ram Lila is held are named after Lala Kokamal. When he died in 1966, his son Radharaman took charge as secretary of Ramlila until his death in 1978. Until their deaths in 2016, his youngest son Raj Narain was the treasurer of Ramlila and his Grandson Hari Kishan Agarwal was the Vice President of this prestigious society. Now Lala Kokamal's Great Grandson Rajeev K Agarwal has also started devoting his time to the event by mainly supporting the fundraising activities.

- In 2008, the Ram Barat was held in the Kamla Nagar area.
- In 2010, it was held in the Balkeshwar area.
- In 2013, Janakpuri was celebrated in the Kamla Nagar Agra.
- In 2015, Janakpuri was celebrated from 8-10 October in the Gandhi Nagar locality.
- In 2018, Janakpuri was celebrated from 7-10 October in the Vijay Nagar locality.
- In 2022 Janakpuri was celebrated from 21-24 September in the Dayal Bagh locality.
- In 2023 Janakpuri was celebrated from 11-14 October in the Sanjay place locality.
- In 2024 Janakpuri was celebrated from 28 September to 2 October in the Shah Ganj locality.
- In 2025 Janakpuri was celebrated from 17-20 September in the Kamla Nagar locality.

== Preparations ==
Preparation for the event begin well in advance and the best craftsmen from the country are invited to set up the Janak Mahal and other elaborate structures. The locality selected for Ram Barat is given special funding and is decorated like a bride's paternal home, ready to receive the Baraatis (Shri Ram and his family entourage).

== Festivities ==
The festivities last for three days. On the first day, marriage procession is undertaken. This is watched by millions of people throughout Agra as well as those arriving from neighbouring districts of Rajasthan & Madhya Pradesh. The area is lit up with thousands of lights and there is non-stop music, and the cinema theatres run film shows throughout the night to accommodate the migratory crowd. These three days can be seen as a large carnival where people from all walks of life come together to have a great time.

== See also ==
- Agra
- Lath mar Holi
- Taj Mahotsav
