= Kavach (TV series) =

- Genre: Supernatural; Drama
- Based on: Savitri and Satyavan
- Directed by: Santram Varma; Ranjan Kumar Singh
- Creative directors: Asgar Ali Shaikh; Sandip Sikand
- Starring: Mona Singh; Mahek Chahal; Sara Khan; Deepika Singh; Namik Paul; Vin Rana
- Opening theme: Hanuman Chalisa; Shiv Chalisa
- Country of origin: India
- Original language: Hindi
- No. of seasons: 2
- No. of episodes: 89

Production
- Producers: Shobha Kapoor; Ekta Kapoor
- Camera setup: Multi-camera
- Running time: 44–55 minutes
- Production company: Balaji Telefilms

Original release
- Network: Colors TV
- Release: 11 June 2016 – 27 October 2019

Kavach ... Kaali Shaktiyon Se also known as Kavach... Mahashivrati (English: Shield) is a supernatural horror drama television series that aired on Colors TV. Produced by Balaji Telefilms, it is based on the story of Savitri and Satyavan.

The first season, titled Kavach... Kali Shaktiyon Se, premiered on 11 June 2016 and starred Mona Singh, Vivek Dahiya and Sara Khan as Paridhi, Rajbeer and Manjulika. The 47-episode first season ended on 20 November 2016.

The 42-episode second season, titled Kavach... Maha Shivratri, premiered on 25 May 2019, starring Deepika Singh Goyal, Namik Paul and Vin Rana as Sandhya, Angad and Kapil. The second season ended abruptly on 27 October 2019.

== Series overview ==
Season	Episodes	Originally Broadcast	
Season	Episodes	First aired	Last aired
1	47	11 June 2016	20 November 2016
2	42	25 May 2019	27 October 2019

== Plot ==
=== Season 2 ===
The second season centres on the mystery of Lord Shiva's temple in Devlali, beside a cremation ground. According to legend, an unmarried woman who worships Lord Shiva there on Mahashivratri night can see the face of her future husband, while evil spirits roam freely.

Sandhya, an unmarried woman engaged to Angad, visits the temple and sees the face of a man. She later discovers that the man is Kapil, Angad's best friend. Although she suspects Angad of seeing another woman, she decides to marry him, while Kapil repeatedly saves her from mysterious mishaps. On her wedding day, however, Sandhya is unexpectedly married to Kapil first, who is revealed to be an evil entity seeking revenge after plotting for two years. Sandhya eventually learns the truth, realises that she loves Angad and breaks her marriage to Kapil. Kapil then possesses Angad, murders Ashutosh and attempts to impregnate Sandhya so that she will bear his child. With Lord Shiva's help, the possessed Angad reveals the truth, and Sandhya protects him by tying a rudraksha around his neck.

Sandhya discovers that Kapil was once a just man who lived with his wife Sakshi and their son. Sakshi is later revealed to be Sandhya's abandoned twin sister and the lost daughter of Usha and Vinayak. Kapil and his family were murdered by Ashutosh, Manoj, Bhairavi and Jolly, causing Kapil and Sakshi to become vengeful spirits. Sandhya tries to persuade them to end the killings, and Shivji's priests eventually force Kapil's spirit to leave Earth. Before departing, however, Kapil has a physical relationship with Sandhya, leaving her pregnant. With Angad and both families supporting her, Sandhya keeps the child and gives birth to a son, Prem. Sakshi, blaming Sandhya for abandoning her, kidnaps Prem.

==== 7 years later ====
Angad and Sandhya have a daughter, Aastha, while Sandhya continues searching for Prem. He is living at Kapil's house like an animal, having had no human interaction. Sandhya eventually finds him and brings him home, but the Jindal family struggles to accept his wild behaviour. Angad becomes resentful, believing Sandhya favours Prem, her son by Kapil, over Aastha. Sakshi returns, jealous of Prem's growing attachment to Sandhya, and uses tantriks to possess her. With the help of a psychic, Rekha, Sandhya uncovers the truth about Sakshi's death and persuades Angad to help her. Sandhya offers to sacrifice herself and surrender everything to Sakshi. Moved by her selflessness, Sakshi leaves, entrusting Prem's safety to Sandhya.

Prem is then haunted by the evil tantrik Bhao. Because Prem was born from the union of a human, Sandhya, and a spirit, Kapil, he possesses supernatural powers. Bhao seeks to capture Prem's body and become immortal, but keeps his powers hidden from him. He sends spirits to force Sandhya to surrender Prem, but she and Angad, aided by Rekha, defeat them. Prem eventually discovers his powers and uses them to protect his family, prompting Sandhya to learn about Bhao and how to destroy him.

Bhao sends Rasika, a spirit who transforms Sandhya's entire family into ghungroo and blackmails her into surrendering Prem. Sandhya complies and subsequently rescues her family. Bhao possesses Prem's body and attempts to kill Angad and Rekha, but Prem resists, preventing Bhao from completing his ritual. Bhao then assumes Prem's form and approaches Sandhya to thwart her plans. Prem nevertheless tries to alert Sandhya to Bhao's presence, allowing her to confront him. Realising the danger to her son, Sandhya becomes a kavach (shield), protecting Prem from Bhao.

== Cast ==
=== Season 1 ===
==== Main ====
- Mona Singh as Paridhi "Pari" Bundela– Bhavya's daughter; Minty's friend; Rajbeer's wife
- Vivek Dahiya as Rajbeer Bundela– Jagat and Janki's son; Vikrant and Shreya's brother; Shakti's foster brother; Manjulika's former lover; Paridhi's husband
- Mahek Chahal / Sara Khan as Manjulika Shah– Saudamini's daughter; Shakti's sister; Rajbeer's former lover; Tipsy's aunt
- Ashwini Kalsekar as Saudamini Shah– Manjulika and Shakti's mother

==== Recurring ====
- Rajeeta Kochhar as Kammo Singh Bundela, Rajbeer's grandmother
- Deepali Kamath as Dhaarini Bundela– Bharat's wife; Rajbeer, Vikrant and Shreya's aunt; Shakti's foster aunt
- Shiva Randani as Bharat Bundela– Jagat's brother; Dhaarini's husband; Rajbeer, Vikrant and Shreya's uncle; Shakti's foster uncle
- Preeti Gupta / Resha Konkar as Natasha Shah– Shakti's wife; Tipsy's mother
- Arun Singh Rana as Vikrant Bundela– Jagat and Janki's son; Rajbeer and Shreya's brother
- Anurag Sharma as Shakti Shah– Saudamini's son; Manjulika's brother; Jagat and Janki's foster son; Rajbeer, Vikrant and Shreya's foster brother; Natasha's husband; Tipsy's father
- Astha Agarwal as Minty Singhal– Paridhi's friend
- Neena Cheema as Damyanti– Paridhi's grandmother
- Avdeep Sidhu as Vishal Mehra– Yamini's son; Shreya's former fiancé
- Parveen Kaur as Yamini Mehra– Vishal's mother
- Leena Jumani as Niti
- Garima Jain as Nisha Angre– Rajbeer's former fiancée
- Arjun Bijlani as Arhaan– Jinn; Paridhi's helper
- Jyoti Gauba as Bhavya– Fairy; Paridhi's mother
- Malhar Pandya as Dr. Akaash Mehra– Psychiatrist
- Pavitra Punia as Ritu Bajpayee– Kabir's sister; Rajbeer's former fiancée
- Mehul Vyas as Kabir Bajpayee– Ritu's brother; Shreya's husband
- Mohit Abrol as Jolly
- Ritu Vijj as Janki Bundela– Jagat's wife; Rajbeer, Vikrant and Shreya's mother; Shakti's foster mother

=== Season 2 ===
==== Main ====
- Deepika Singh Goyal in a double role as
  - Sandhya Jindal – (nee Patvaradhan) Vinayak and Usha's daughter; Sakshi, Mowgli and Suman's sister; Kapil's former wife; Angad's wife; Prem and Aastha's mother
  - Sakshi Salgaonkar – Vinayak and Usha's daughter; Sandhya, Mowgli and Suman's sister; Kapil's wife
- Namik Paul as Angad Jindal – Balraj and Malini's son; Shobha and Sanjana's brother; Roohi and Dev's cousin; Sandhya's husband; Aastha's father
- Zoya Viaan Shah as Prem Salgaonkar – Kapil and Sandhya's son
- Vin Rana as Kapil Salgaonkar – Sakshi's husband; Sandhya's former husband; Prem's father
- Alina Pagaria as Aastha Jindal– Angad and Sandhya's daughter
- Mallika Nayak as Malini Jindal – Balraj's wife; Angad, Shobha and Sanjana's mother
- Manuj Bhaskar as Balraj Jindal – Jolly's brother; Malini's husband; Angad, Shobha and Sanjana's father; Roohi and Dev's uncle
- Pranitaa Pandit as Rekha – Psychic

==== Recurring ====
- Antara Banerjee as Sanjana Jindal – Balraj and Malini's daughter; Angad and Shobha's sister
- Harsh Vashisht as Jolly Jindal – Balraj's brother; Kiran's husband; Roohi and Dev's father; Angad, Shobha and Sanjana's uncle
- Bhavana Roy as Kiran Jindal – Jolly's wife; Roohi and Dev's mother; Angad, Shobha and Sanjana's aunt
- Rushal Parakh as Dev Jindal – Jolly and Kiran's son; Roohi's brother; Angad, Shobha and Sanjana's cousin
- Sabina Jat as Roohi Jindal – Jolly and Kiran's daughter; Dev's sister; Angad, Shobha and Sanjana's cousin
- Susheel Bonthiyaal as Vinayak Patwardhan – Veerendra and Madhuri's son; Mankesh and Manju's brother; Usha's husband; Sandhya, Sakshi, Mowgli and Suman's father; Ankit, Kartik and Akhil's uncle
- Deepali Kamath as Usha Patwardhan – Vinayak's wife; Sandhya, Sakshi, Mowgli and Suman's mother; Ankit, Kartik and Akhil's aunt
- Smita Oak as Madhuri Patwardhan – Veerendra's wife; Vinayak, Mankesh and Manju's mother; Sandhya, Sakshi, Mowgli, Suman, Ankit, Kartik and Akhil's grandmother
- Susheel Parashar as Veerendra Patwardhan – Madhuri's husband; Vinayak, Mankesh and Manju's father; Sandhya, Sakshi, Mowgli, Suman, Ankit, Kartik and Akhil's grandfather
- Nidhi Shah as Suman Patwardhan – Vinayak and Usha's daughter; Sandhya, Sakshi and Mowgli's sister
- Lavannya Bharadwaj as Mowgli Patwardan – Vinayak and Usha's son; Sandhya, Sakshi and Suman's brother
- Mandeep Kumar as Mankesh Patwardhan – Veerendra and Madhuri's son; Vinayak and Manju's brother; Pratibha's husband; Ankit, Kartik and Akhil's father; Sandhya, Sakshi, Mowgli and Suman's uncle
- Luckbir Arora as Ankit Patwardhan – Mankesh and Pratibha's son; Kartik and Akhil's brother; Sandhya, Sakshi, Mowgli and Suman's cousin; Shobha's husband
- Sanyogita Mayer as Shobha Patwardhan – Balraj and Malini's daughter; Angad and Sanjana's sister; Roohi and Dev's cousin; Rishi's former wife; Ankit's wife
- Suraj Kakkar as Police Officer Kartik Patwardhan – Mankesh and Pratibha's son; Ankit and Akhil's brother; Sandhya, Sakshi, Mowgli and Suman's cousin
- Kabeer Kumar as Akhil Patwardhan – Mankesh and Pratibha's son; Ankit and Kartik's brother; Sandhya, Sakshi, Mowgli and Suman's cousin
- Hritu Dudani as Nisha
- Vijay Badlani as Rishi Mitter – Shobha's former husband
- Shirin Sewani as Archana – Sandhya's friend
- Afzaal Khan as Manoj – Jolly's friend
- Rishika Nag as Ranjana – Sandhya's friend
- Yogita Bihani as Manju Patwardhan – Veerendra and Madhuri's daughter; Vinayak and Mankesh's sister; Sandhya, Sakshi, Mowgli, Suman, Ankit, Kartik and Akhil's aunt
