= Second Marriage Dot Com =

- Directed by: Gaurav Panjwani
- Story by: Dinkar Sharma
- Produced by: Vinod Mehta
- Starring: Mohit Chauhan; Vishal Nayak; Charu Rahtogi; Sayani Gupta
- Edited by: Rahul Sharma/Gaurav Panjwani
- Music by: Mannan Munjal, Aditya Agarwal
- Production company: Vin Mehta Films Pvt Ltd.
- Release date: 10 August 2012
- Country: India
- Language: Hindi

Second Marriage Dot Com is a 2012 Hindi-language film directed by Gaurav Panjwani, art direction by Priyanka Agarwal, Segment Editing & VFX by Rahul Sharma featuring Mohit Chauhan, Vishal Nayak, Charu Rahtogi and Sayani Gupta in the lead roles. The film is produced by Vinod Mehta under the banner of Vin Mehta Films Pvt Ltd. and was released on 10 August 2012.

== Plot ==
The film kicks off when Akshay, a young IT professional from Delhi and only child of single parent Suneel Narang, embarks on a journey to get his father, a widower, married so to finally put an end to his prolonged loneliness. Coincidentally in Jaipur, a vibrant young girl, Poonam, is on the same hunt to find a partner for her mother, Shoma, whom she's seen as a divorcee since childhood. They get in touch with each other through a matrimonial website named 'secondmarriage.com' and after their parents' initial denial, they finally marry.

Poonam and Shoma then join Akshay and Suneel in a new adequate flat in Gurgaon. A distinguished family scenario arises for the four, filled with a new cook hailing from a rustic background, Bihaari and a north-eastern maid Flower. Suneel and Shoma are not at ease with each other to start with, but gradually sparks begin to fly. Poonam and Akshay who had become good friends from the start, and who themselves are lonely souls with bitter memories, are happy to discover a feeling which had always eluded them – the joy of a family.

Poonam and Akshay find themselves in love with each other after a night of irrepressible emotions which results in an inconceivable event; the happiness of the four goes for a toss. The story takes sharp turns and explores dark zones of the human psyche before the characters finally square up for an unaccustomed but fairly logical solution to their situation.

== Cast ==
- Mohit Chauhan as Suneel
- Charu Rahtogi as Shoma
- Vishal Nayak as Akshay
- Sayani Gupta as Poonam
- Kanisha Malhotra as Nikita
- Akhilendra Mishra
- Ankit Sharma as Veeja
- Amit Mistry
- Mustaq Khan
- Arun Verma
- Rajat Rawail
- Anita Mudgal as Seeta
- Pankaj Sharma as Lakshman
- Mohit Baghel as Waiter

== Soundtrack ==
The soundtrack is composed by Mannan Munjal and Aditya Agarwal. The music has received generally positive reviews with songs like Manchala, Barsaat, Kamli and Balam receiving positive reviews. Balam is sung by Rekha Bharadwaj.
