= Sayani Gupta =

Indian actress (born 1985)

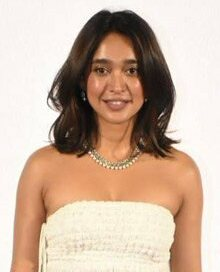
- Gupta in 2023
- Born: 9 October 1985 (age 41); Calcutta, West Bengal, India
- Education: Film and Television Institute of India
- Occupation: Actress
- Years active: 2011–present

Sayani Gupta (Bengali pronunciation: [sayoni ɡupto]; born 9 October 1985) is an Indian actress who appears in Hindi films. A graduate of the Film and Television Institute of India, she made her feature film debut in 2012 with Second Marriage Dot Com. She has since appeared in supporting roles in films such as Fan (2016), Jolly LLB 2 (2017) and Article 15 (2019). She essayed the role of a blind Pakistani-Bangladeshi lesbian activist named Khanum in Margarita with a Straw opposite Kalki Koechlin.

== Early life and education ==
Gupta was born on 9 October 1985 in Calcutta (now Kolkata) in West Bengal in a Bengali family. She graduated from the Film and Television Institute of India.

== Other activities ==
=== Singer ===
As a singer, she sang "Kahab To" in Article 15. She also served background vocals on most of the Four More Shots Please soundtrack.

=== Filmmaking ===
In 2026, Gupta made her directorial debut with the short film Aasmani, which she also wrote and produced. The film stars Revathy and follows an elderly woman and her granddaughter, exploring themes of love, ageing and independence.

The project was produced by the Sumitra Gupta Foundation for Arts and One India Stories, with executive producers including Nikkhil Advani, Dia Mirza, and Ananya Rane. The screenplay received multiple international awards prior to its planned festival premiere in 2026.

== Filmography ==
=== Films ===
Key
†	Denotes films that have not yet been released

Year	Title	Role	Note
2012	Second Marriage Dot Com	Poonam	
2012	Tasher Desh	Young Queen	Bengali film
2014	Shuruaat Ka Interval	Opa	
2015	Margarita with a Straw	Khanum	
2015	Parched	Champa	
2016	Fan	Sunaina	
2016	Baar Baar Dekho	Chitra	
2017	Jolly LLB 2	Hina Siddiqui	
2017	The Hungry	Loveleen Ahuja	
2017	Jagga Jasoos	Little Girl	
2017	Jab Harry Met Sejal	Isha	Deleted scene
2017	Fukrey Returns	Sheetal	Deleted scene
2019	Darkness Visible	Asha	English film
2019	Article 15	Gaura	
2019	Posham Pa	Regha	
2019	Axone	Upasana	
2021	Pagglait	Akansha	
2022	Sherdil: The Pilibhit Saga	Lajwanti "Lajjo"	
2023	Zwigato	Zwigato Regional Head	
2024	Khwaabon Ka Jhamela	Ruby	
2024	Mitran Da Chaleya Truck Ni	Meeta	Punjabi film

=== Television ===
Year	Title	Role	Notes	Ref.
2017–2021	Inside Edge	Rohini Raghavan		
2018	Kaushiki	Kaushiki		
2019–2025	Four More Shots Please!	Damini Rizvi-Roy		
2020	The Good Karma Hospital	Jyoti Gill	Season 3 episode 2	
2024	Call Me Bae	Madhulika Sahay/Anamika	Special appearance	
2025	Delhi Crime	Kusum	Season 3	
2026	Glory	Joyna Hazarika		

=== Short films ===
Year	Title	Role	Ref.
2015	Leeches	Raisa	
2016	Call Waiting	Aarti	
2017	The Proposal		
2018	Shame	Natasha	
2018	Detour 25 August	Nimisha	
2019	Red Velvet		
2019	Shameless	Bharti	
