= Mohit Chauhan (actor) =

Indian actor

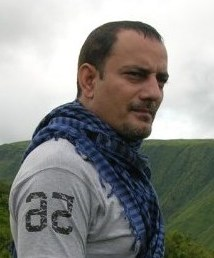
- Mohit Chauhan in Shillong filming for Shivam
- Born: Mohit Chauhan
- Occupation: Actor
- Known for: Dhoom 2 Chak De! India

Mohit Chauhan is an Indian actor who works in Hindi films. He is known for his role as the Prime Minister of India in the web series Ranneeti: Balakot & Beyond. He made his debut in Rohit Shetty's Zameen, but achieved fame in Chak De India, and he went on to do films such as Dil Kabaddi, and Second Marriage Dot Com.

== Career ==
Mohit became a very familiar face on everyday TV by doing extensive episodes of daily soap operas and informative shows like Crime Patrol, Rishta.com, Tera Mujh Se Hai Pehle Ka Nata Koi, Khote Sikke, Ek Hazaron Mein Meri Behna Hai and Sadda Haq for Channel V. He even played Raja Janak in Mahadev and played roles in other television series like Dehleez, and Naamkarann on Star Plus.

== Filmography ==
=== Films ===
Year	Title	Role	Notes
2003	Zameen		
2005	Jurm		
2006	Dhoom 2	Chief Security	
2007	Chak De! India	Uttam Singh	
2008	Dil Kabaddi		
2009	Detective Naani		
2010	Prince	Agent Roy	
2010	Life Express	Anurag	
2012	Second Marriage Dot Com	Suneel Narang	
2013	Maazii	Sushil Jain	
2013	Monsoon Shootout	Builder Ali	
2019	War	VK Naidu	
2019	Four More Shots Please!	Mahesh Roy	
2023	Dono	Ashok Jaisingh	
2024	Do Patti	Prithvi Singh Sood	
2025	Sky Force	Air Chief Marshal Arjun Sinha	

=== Television ===
Year	Title	Role	Notes
2010	Rishta.com		
2011	Khotey Sikkey		
2011–2013	Ek Hazaaron Mein Meri Behna Hai	Madan Chaudhary	
2011	Tera Mujhse Hai Pehle Ka Naata Koi		
2011–2014	Devon Ke Dev...Mahadev	King Janaka	
2013–2016	Sadda Haq	Mr. Kishore Aggarwal	
2014	Tum Aise Hi Rehna	Vishesh Agarwal	
2013	Pradhanmantri	Major General J. F. R. Jacob	
2016	Dahleez	Haider Jilani	
2017	Haasil	Mr. Raichand	
2018	Naamkarann	KK's father	
2017–18	Rishton Ka Chakravyuh	Pandit Murari Pathak	

=== Web series ===
Year	Title	Role	Platform	Notes
2019	Fittrat	Alok Bisht	ALTBalaji and ZEE5	
2020	Bebaakee	Farhad Alqaazi	ALTBalaji and ZEE5	
2020	The Raikar Case	Vinayak Naik Raikar	Voot (Now JioHotstar)	
