= Saubhagyalakshmi =

- Genre: Indian soap opera Romance
- Created by: Rashmi Sharma
- Starring: Abigail Jain; Sara Khan; Apurva Agnihotri
- Country of origin: India
- Original language: Hindi
- No. of seasons: 2
- No. of episodes: Season 1: Bhagyalaxmi: 220 Season 2: Saubhagyalakshmi: 46

Production
- Producers: Rashmi Sharma; Pawan Kumar Marut
- Production locations: Indore; Mumbai
- Camera setup: Multi-camera
- Running time: Approx. 22 minutes
- Production company: Rashmi Sharma Telefilms Limited

Original release
- Network: &TV
- Release: 4 January – 4 March 2016

Related
- Bhagyalaxmi

Saubhaghyalakshmi is a daily soap opera that airs on Zee Network's Hindi entertainment channel &TV. It is the second season of the same channel's show Bhagyalakshmi. The story follows the lives of the characters Kavya, Kuhu and Muskaan - the daughters of Divya, Pavitra and Bhoomi from the previous season.

== Plot ==
Kuhu, Kavya and Muskaan live with their grandmother "Dadi Maa". Dadi Maa has always kept Kavya at a distance and dislikes her since she hates her mother Divya, who had pretended to be Bhoomi and whose first husband Yuvraj had murdered the entire Prajapati family. The family is shown to have fallen on hard times and barely scraping through.

One day, after a boy meets with a road accident, Kavya stops a passing car asking for help. However, the owner is the rich businessman Samarth Ranawat who tells her off accusing her of being one of those poor people who try to defraud rich car owners for money. An angered Kavya slaps him but later that day discovers that Samarth is her new boss. Samarth appoints her his personal assistant making her work like a servant at his house. Kavya, who has taken a loan from the firm, is forced to work for Samarth and also clashes with his dominating older sister Bhairavi.

Muskaan runs into a young boy named Sambhav. Sambhav begins pursuing Muskaan and after he buys her expensive gifts, they start dating secretly. Meanwhile, Samarth also falls in love with Muskaan at first sight. He sends Bhairavi with a marriage proposal to Muskaan's house but, unaware of Samarth's wealth and believing Sambhav to be more successful, Muskaan rejects the proposal leaving Samarth shocked. While helping Kavya with her office work, Muskaan discovers that Sambhav is Samarth's good-for-nothing nephew who is living off his uncle's wealth. She quickly ends her relationship with Sambhav and accepts Samarth's proposal.

The wedding day is set for three days later. On the wedding day, Muskaan runs away and Bhairavi and Dadi Maa convince Kavya to marry Samarth. Right after the wedding rituals, a dejected Samarth is manipulated by Muskaan into thinking she was abducted and marries her at a temple and brings her home declaring her to be his wife. Kavya confronts Muskaan about her premarital affair but Samarth refuses to believe her and expresses his desire to give her a divorce so he can be with Muskaan. Dadi Maa and Bhairavi side with Kavya but Samarth is adamant.

Muskaan goes missing the next day and Samarth quickly blames Kavya who is arrested by the police. Bhairavi's older son Shrenik supports Kavya and bails her out. Meanwhile, Sambhav is discovered injured outside a temple where he was attacked by Muskaan after she realised he did not have any money and decided to return to Samarth. Sambhav throws Kavya under the bus and decides to stay quiet to save himself. However, in her efforts to find Muskaan, Kavya discovers Muskaan's secret boyfriend was Sambhav and Samarth breaks all ties with him. Muskaan is discovered in an abandoned building and brought home where she pledges her love to Samarth who is cold towards her. Sambhav has a change of heart and warns Kavya about Muskaan's selfishness.

Kavya and Samarth grow closer as he sees her selflessness and concern for everyone and feels confused about his feelings for her. He reveals to Kavya that he married Muskaan only because she looked like his dead wife Priya. Kavya overhears Muskaan discussing a plan over the phone and follows her to discover that Muskaan, Shrenik and Bhairavi have been working together to control Samarth's wealth and that Shrenik and Bhairave were responsible for the accident that killed Priya.

Kavya is abducted by them and Samarth is drugged to be thrown off a cliff in a car. However, he bribes the hired thugs and manages to record Bhairavi's confession. Bhairavi, Shrenik and Muskaan are arrested. Samarth finally proposes to Kavya who accepts.

The show ends on a happy note as a year later Kavya is shown pregnant and Sambhav and Kuhu marry.

== Cast ==
- Neelam Sivia as Muskaan Prajapati, Maan and Bhoomi's daughter
- Abigail Jain as Kavya Prajapati, Maan and Divya's daughter
- Sara Khan as Kuhu Upadhyay, Pavitra's daughter, Maan's niece
- Apurva Agnihotri as Samarth Ranawat, a rich businessman who marries Kavya
- Sheeba Akashdeep as Bhairavi Birla, Samarth's elder sister
- Amaad Mintoo as Sambhav Birla, Bhairavi's younger son
- Angad Hasija as Shrenik Birla, Bhairavi's elder son
- Aruna Irani as Vasundhara Prajapati / Dadi Maa, Maan's mother and Kavya, Kuhu and Muskaan's grandmother
- Arti Singh
- Vijay Sethupathi
- S. P. B. Charan
