= Kanisha Malhotra =

Indian actress

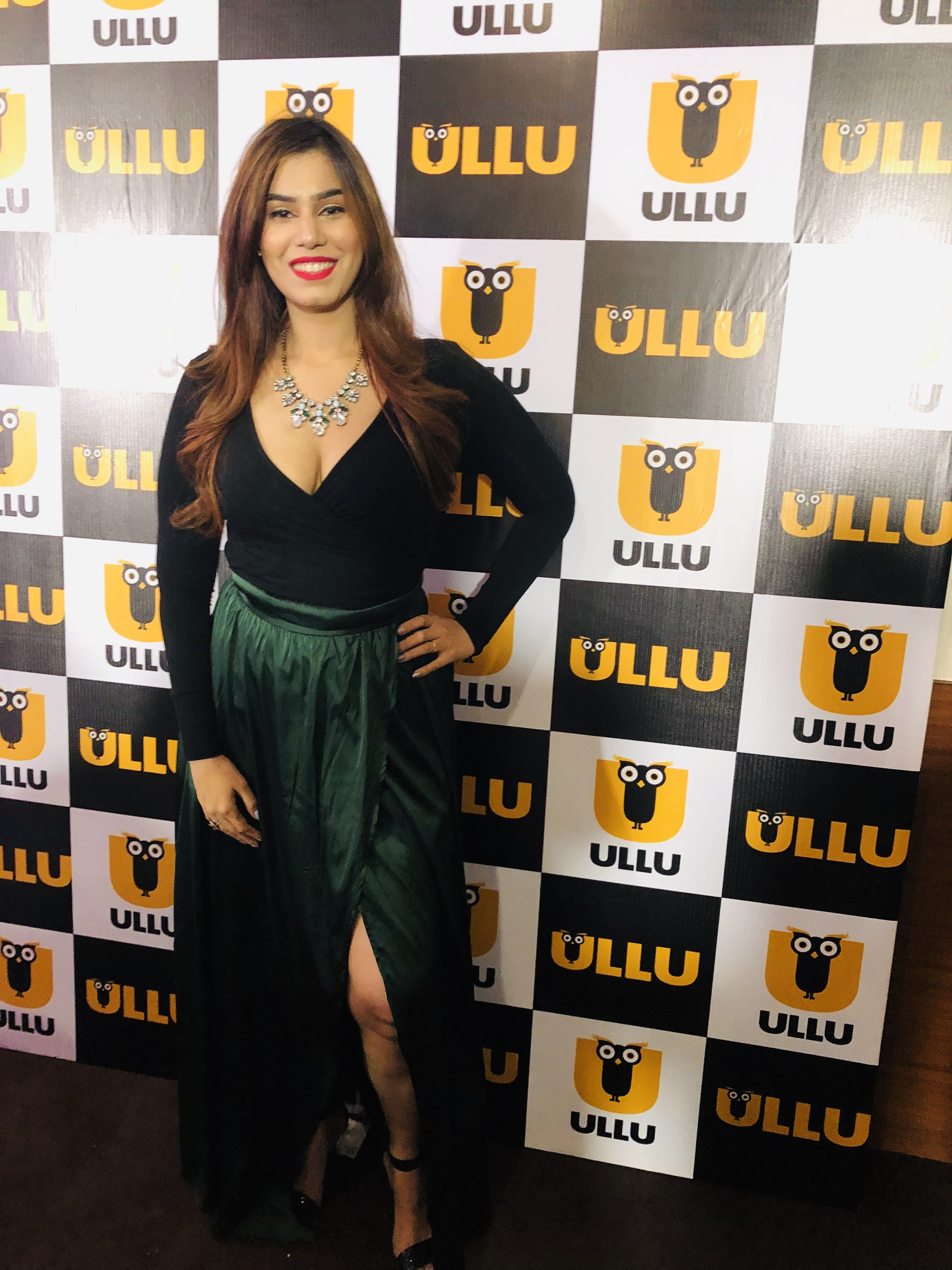
- Kanisha Malhotra at the Premiere of Dance Bar
- Born: 28 October
- Education: Delhi University
- Occupations: Actress; model; writer; director
- Years active: 2007- 2017

Kanisha Malhotra is an Indian television actress and model known for television shows like Jai Jai Jai Bajrang Bali, Maharakshak: Devi and Yeh Hai Mohabbatein. She shot to fame with Second Marriage Dot Com. Malhotra is also known as a stylist, director and script writer.

== In the media ==
Kanisha bagged her first Bollywood feature in 2011 named Second Marriage Dot Com which released in August 2012. She later moved to Mumbai in 2013 and appeared in many television shows. Her debut was from MTV webbed Balaji Telefilms in 2013 and later she played character of Ratna Nidhi in Jai Jai Jai Bajrang Bali, Sagar Arts. Kanisha did number of episodics including CID, Pyaar Tune Kya Kiya, Channel V distractions, Gumrah. In 2015 she signed feature film Udanchoo. Later that year, she appeared in Zee TV show Maharakshak: Devi and Star Plus' Yeh Hai Mohabbatein. In 2016 January Kanisha moved to direction and assisted director Ram Gopal Varma on Veerappan. Post that she appeared in the show Agar Tum Saath Ho andnd P.O.W. - Bandi Yuddh Ke

== Television ==
| Year | Show | Role | Notes |
|---|---|---|---|
| 2011-15 | Jai Jai Jai Bajrang Bali | Ratnanidhi | |
| 2015 | Yeh Hai Mohabbatein | ACP Shalini | |
| 2015 | Maharakshak: Devi | Deepali | |
| 2015 | CID (Indian TV series) | Deepti | |
| 2017 | P.O.W. - Bandi Yuddh Ke | Ananya | |
| 2017 | Agar Tum Sath Ho | Zeba | |
| 2017 | Pyaar Tune Kya Kiya | | |

== Filmography ==
- Second Marriage Dot Com as Nikita
- Veerappan as Assistant Director
