= Bay Khudi =

Pakistani drama serial

- Title screen
- بے خودی
- Genre: Drama
- Written by: Seema Munaf
- Directed by: Aabis Raza
- Starring: Noor Hassan Rizvi; Sara Khan
- Opening theme: "Bay Khudi Besabab Nahi" by Sana Zulfiqar and Adnan Dhool
- Composer: Soch Band
- Country of origin: Pakistan
- Original language: Urdu
- No. of episodes: 24

Production
- Producers: Humayun Saeed; Shahzad Nasib
- Running time: approx. 45 minutes
- Production companies: Six Sigma Plus and Next Level Entertainment

Original release
- Network: ARY Digital
- Release: 17 November 2016 – 4 May 2017

Bay Khudi (Urdu: بے خودی) is a Pakistani Urdu-language television drama serial that aired on ARY Digital from 17 November 2016 to 4 May 2017, running for 24 episodes. Written by Seema Munaf and directed by Aabis Raza, the serial was produced by Humayun Saeed and Shahzad Nasib under the banners of Six Sigma Plus and Next Level Entertainment. It stars Noor Hassan Rizvi and Indian actress Sara Khan in the lead roles, with the latter making her Pakistani television debut.

The serial's working title was Yeh Kaisi Mohabbat Hai. It aired on Thursdays at 9:00 pm.

== Plot ==
Following the death of her father, Fiza moves with her mother into the home of her maternal aunt, where she is raised alongside her cousin Saad. Saad's mother regards Fiza as a daughter, and Fiza forms a close friendship with Saad, unaware that he harbours romantic feelings for her. When Fiza becomes engaged to Ashar, a man she loves, Saad is unable to reconcile himself to the match, and his attachment develops into an obsession with destructive consequences for both families.

== Cast ==
- Sara Khan as Fiza
- Noor Hassan Rizvi as Saad
- Bilal Abbas as Arsam
- Komal Aziz Khan as Mariam
- Laila Zuberi as Saabra
- Hajra Khan as Faiza
- Arsalan Faisal as Ashar
- Fahad Ahmad as Faruq
- Rahma Khan as Wania
- Fazila Qazi as Rukhsana

== Reception ==
Writing for Dawn, Sadaf Haider criticised the serial as part of a broader trend in Pakistani television of treating sexual violence as a romantic plot device, arguing that the narrative softened the gravity of the central character's actions by presenting him sympathetically. In a 2017 end-of-year review, Haider again cited the drama as an example of problematic storytelling choices on Pakistani television.

During production, lead actress Sara Khan was the subject of press reports, later denied, regarding her legal status in Pakistan.

== Accolades ==
Year	Award	Category	Recipients	Result	Ref.
2018	Lux Style Awards	Best Original Soundtrack	Adnan Dhool and Sana Zulfiqar	Nominated	

== Soundtrack ==
The original soundtrack, "Bay Khudi Besabab Nahi", was composed by Soch Band and performed by Sana Zulfiqar and Adnan Dhool.

=== Track listing ===
All lyrics are written by Soch Band; all music is composed by Soch Band.

No.	Title	Artist(s)	Length
1.	"Bay Khudi Besabab Nahi"	Sana Zulfiqar and Adnan Dhool	4:16
