= Prachi Sinha =

Indian model and actress

- Born: 5 April 1996 (age 30); Patna, Bihar, India
- Occupations: Model, Actress
- Years active: 2014-present

Prachi Sinha is an Indian model and actress. She is best known for playing the role of Vardaan in the popular television soap opera Vishkanya on Zee TV. She was also cast in the film Angry Young Man.

== Filmography ==
=== Films ===
Year	Serial	Role	Language
2014	Angry Young Man	Sarah	Hindi
2013	Chanda Na Tume Tara		Odia

=== Television ===
Year	Serial	Role	Channel
2016	Vishkanya	Vardaan Malay Mittal	Zee TV
