= Yeh Jo Mohabbat Hai =

- Directed by: Shree Narayan Singh
- Screenplay by: Dilip Shukla
- Produced by: Ashim Samanta
- Starring: Aditya Samanta; Nazia Hussain; Mohnish Behl; Rati Agnihotri; Farida Jalal; Mukesh Tiwari; Anooradha Patel; Preet Kaur Madhan; Siddharth Arora
- Cinematography: Fuwad Khan
- Music by: Anu Malik
- Release date: 3 August 2012
- Country: India
- Language: Hindi

Yeh Jo Mohabbat Hai (transl. This Love) is a 2012 Indian romantic drama film. It released in India and other countries on 3 August 2012.

== Cast ==
- Aditya Samanta as Karan Chaudhary
- Nazia Hussain as Karishma Rathore
- Amita Nagia
- Rati Agnihotri as Mamta
- Farida Jalal
- Mukesh Tiwari
- Anuradha Patel
- Preet Kaur Madhan
- Mohnish Behl
- Siddharth Arora
- Aham Sharma
- Manasvi Vyas

== Soundtrack ==
The soundtrack of Yeh Jo Mohabbat Hai is composed by Anu Malik. The album consist of seven songs.

=== Track list ===
Track	Song	Singers	Lyricist(s)	Duration
01	Pyaar Karna Na Tha (Male)	Mohit Chauhan	Anand Bakshi	7:38
02	Pyaar Karna Na Tha (Female)	Shreya Ghoshal	Anand Bakshi	7:12
03	Tere Bina jee Na Laage	Mohit Chauhan, Suzanne D'Mello	Kausar Munir	6:16
04	Naina Thak Thak Haare	Roop Kumar Rathod	Faaiz Anwar	7:09
05	Kyon Kyon	Shaan, Shreya Ghoshal	Faaiz Anwar	5:43
06	Big Fat Indian Wedding	Neeraj Shridhar, Anmol Malik	Anu Malik	5:48
07	Angel My Angel	Sonu Nigam, Alisha Chinai	Kausar Munir	4:04
