= Palkon Ki Chhaon Mein 2 =

Indian drama television series

- Genre: Drama
- Starring: Vin Rana; Ashish Dixit; Trupti Mishra
- Country of origin: India
- Original language: Hindi
- No. of seasons: 1
- No. of episodes: 308

Production
- Producer: Rashmi Sharma
- Camera setup: Multi-camera
- Running time: 22–24 minutes
- Production company: Rashmi Sharma Telefilms

Original release
- Network: Dangal
- Release: 3 October 2022 – 20 August 2023

Palkon Ki Chhaon Mein 2 (transl. In the Shade of the Eyelashes 2) is a Hindi-language Indian drama television series. Produced by Rashmi Sharma Telefilms, it premiered on 3 October 2022 on Dangal. It is the second installment of Rehna Hai Teri Palkon Ki Chhaon Mein, starring Vin Rana and Trupti Mishra in lead roles. It formerly starred Ashish Dixit in lead role. It ended on 20 August 2023.

== Plot ==
This is the story of Suman, a young orphan whose dreams of finding family and love come true when she becomes part of a loving, traditional joint family.

Suman lives in a girls' hostel with her best friend Nandini, who comes from a wealthy, traditional and affectionate family. Nandini's mother, Surabhi, meets Suman and decides that she should become her future daughter-in-law. Suman meets Surabhi's son Nandan, and they quickly fall in love. However, Suman is shocked to learn that she has been chosen for Nandan's elder stepbrother, Anshuman. Torn between her love for Nandan and her loyalty to the family that has treated her like a daughter, Suman faces a difficult choice.

After many difficulties, Nandan and Suman marry. However, while travelling, their car's brakes fail. Nandan pushes Suman out of the car but cannot escape himself. The car plunges into a waterfall, and Nandan is presumed dead. The family subsequently blames and hates Suman, with only Anshuman and his new fiancée, Tanya, initially supporting her. Tanya eventually turns against Suman after noticing Anshuman's growing concern for her.

Suman endures numerous trials before eventually being accepted by her in-laws again. During this time, she and Anshuman fall in love. With the family's blessing, they marry.

== Cast ==
=== Main ===
- Vin Rana as Anshuman Jha: Chanda and Mithilesh's son; Surabhi's stepson; Aarati's elder cousin; Nandan and Nandini's elder half-brother; Suman's husband; Sandhya's ex–husband; Devakinandan's elder grandson (2022–2023)
- Trupti Mishra as Suman Anshuman Jha / Suman Nandan Jha (née Upadhyay): Shikar's younger sister, Nandan's ex–wife; Anshuman's wife (2022–2023)
- Ashish Dixit as Nandan Jha: Surabhi and Mithilesh's son; Anshuman's younger half-brother; Aarati's younger cousin; Nandini's twin brother, Suman and Amoli's ex–husband; Aanchal's husband; Tanya's fake husband; Devakinandan's younger grandson (2022–2023)

=== Recurring ===
- Jaya Ojha as Surabhi Mithilesh Jha: Mithilesh's wife; Nandan and Nandini's mother; Anshuman’s stepmother; Suman's mother-in-law (2022–2023)
- Jaya Bhattacharya as Manorama Madhusudan Jha: Madhusudan's wife; Surabhi's elder sister; Aarati's mother; Baby Suman's maternal grandmother (2022–2023)
- Raj Premi as Devakinandan 'Rai Bahaddur' Jha: Mithilesh and Madhusudan's father; Aarati, Anshuman, Nandan, Nandini and Bachcha's grandfather; Surabhi, Manorama and Uma's father–in–law; Suman and Aanchal's grandfather–in–law (2022–2023)
- Sara Khan as Tanya Rastogi: Anshuman's ex-fiancée; Nandan's fake wife; Suman's rival (2022–2023)
- Vishal Nayak as Sirish Bharadwaj (2023) (Dead)
- Seema Azmi as Urmila Upadhyay: Suman's aunt "Mami" (2022–2023)
- Sandeep Mehta as Mithilesh Jha: Devakinandan's younger son; Madhusudan's younger brother; Surabhi's husband; Chanda's ex-boyfriend; Anshuman, Nandan and Nandini's father (2022–2023)
- Sheetal Ranjankar / Nazre Inayat Khan as Dr. Nandini Jha: Mithilesh and Surabhi's daughter; Aarati's younger cousin; Nandan's twin sister; Anshuman's younger half-sister; Devakinandan's younger granddaughter (2022–2023) / (2023)
- Rajesh Puri as Mr. Upadhyay: Suman's grandfather; Urmila's father–in–law (2022–2023)
- Lavneesh Dutta / Hritik Yadav as Shikhar: Suman's brother; Nandini's husband (2022) / (2023)
- Mehul Nisar as Mr. Upadhyay: Suman's maternal uncle; Urmila's husband (2022–2023)
- Ashank Singh as Saurabh Bharadwaj: Aarati's former husband; Jaykant's son; Baby Suman's father (2022–2023)
- Alka Singh as Aarati Jha (formerly Bharadwaj): Manorama and Madhusudan's daughter; Uma's stepdaughter; Bachcha's elder half-sister; Anshuman's younger cousin; Nandan and Nandini's elder cousin; Saurabh's former wife; Baby Suman's mother; Devakinandan's elder granddaughter (2022–2023)
- Rajan Verma as Ketari
- Ram Awana as Jaykant Bharadwaj: Saurabh's father; Aarati's father–in–law (2022)
- Meena Mir as
  - Jagrani: Chanda's look–alike; Leader of Human Trafficking gang (2023)
  - Chanda: Anshuman's biological mother; Mithilesh's ex-girlfriend (2023)
- Nidhi Bhavsar as Amoli Nandan Jha: A tribal girl who saved Suman's life; Nandan's ex–wife (2023)
- Gulzar Khan as Amoli's mother (2023)
- Sejal Jaiswal as Aanchal Nandan Jha: Nandan's wife; Sandhya and Maya's younger sister (2023)
- Alan Kapoor as Dr. Rajeev Roy: Mahima's son (2023)
- Poonam Dwivedi as Nurse (2023)
- Apeksha Malviya as Advocate Sandhya Anshuman Jha: Aanchal's elder sister; Maya's younger sister; Anshuman's ex–wife (2023)
- Chitrapama Banerjee as Mahima Roy: Rajeev's mother (2023)
- Deepshikha Nagpal as Maya: Sandhya and Aanchal's elder sister; Rinky's mother (2023)
- as Rinky: Maya's daughter (2023)
- Amar Sharma as Madhusudan Jha: Devakinandan's elder son; Mithilesh's elder brother; Manorama and Uma's husband; Aarati and Bachcha's father; Baby Suman's maternal grandfather; Anshuman, Nandan and Nandini's paternal uncle; Saurabh's former father–in–law; Suman's family’s murderer (2023)
- Aryan Hasan as Bhola: Maya's bodyguard (2023)
- Sangeeta Kapure as Uma Manorama Jha: Madhusudhan's second wife; Bachcha's mother; Aarati's stepmother (2023)
- Rahul Patel as Bachcha Jha: Madhusudan and Uma's son; Manorama's stepson; Aarati's younger half-brother (2023)

=== Cameo appearances ===
- Sonal Khilwani as Bindiya Abhay Bharadwaj from Bindiya Sarkar (2023)

== Production ==
The show title is based on the 1977 film Palkon Ki Chhaon Mein. The shooting of the series began in September 2022, some initial sequences were also shot at Indore and Ujjain.

Ashish Dixit, Vin Rana and Trupti Mishra were cast as lead. Sara Khan was cast to portray the negative lead and joined by Vishal Nayak.

Palkon Ki Chhaon Mein 2 promos were released in September 2022. It premeried on 3 October 2022 on Dangal TV.

== See also ==
- List of programmes broadcast by Dangal TV
