= Vishakanya =

Female assassins or inauspicious women in Indian literature

The Vishakanya (Sanskrit: विषकन्या IAST: Viṣakanyā) were young women reportedly used as assassins, often against powerful enemies, in Ancient India. Their blood and bodily fluids were purportedly poisonous to other humans, as was mentioned in the ancient Indian treatise on statecraft, Arthashastra, written by Chanakya, an adviser and a prime minister to the first Maurya Emperor Chandragupta (c. 340–293 BC).

== Literature ==
In the Skanda Purana, a girl who is born when the sun is in the constellation Chitra or the moon in the fourteenth lunar day is stated to be fated to become a Vishakanya. Such a woman is described to cause death to her husband after being married to her after a period of six months, make the house she lives in to become devoid of wealth, and cause misery to her family.

However, in time, "poison damsel" passed into folklore, became an archetype explored by many writers, resulting in a popular literary character that appears in many works, including classical Sanskrit texts such as Sukasaptati.

== History ==
The Viṣakanya or "Poison Damsel' is a literary figure that appears in Sanskrit literature as a type of assassin used by kings to kill enemies. Young girls were raised on a carefully crafted diet of poison and antidote from a very young age, a practice now referred to as mithridatism. Although many would not survive, those that did were immune to other poisons, and their body fluids would be poisonous to others; sexual contact would thus be lethal to other humans. Myths also state that Vishakanya can cause instant death with just a touch.

According to Kaushik Roy, Vishakanyas would kill their targets by seducing them and giving them poisoned alcohol.

Some Sanskrit sources narrate that a Vishakanya was sent by Nanda's minister Amatyarakshasa to kill Chandragupta Maurya and Chanakya diverted them to kill Parvatak.

According to Indian historical sources the Vishakanya was used by Nanda Dynasty founder Mahapadma Nanda to kill the last ruler of Shishunaga Dynasty Kalashoka, both of which belonged to the Magadha Kingdom.

== In popular culture ==
The Vishakanya has been a popular theme in Indian literature and folklore, and apart from appearing in classical Sanskrit texts, it has appeared repeatedly in various works like Vishkanya by Shivani and Ek Aur Vish Kanya? by Om Prakash Sharma, who use the Vishakanya as an archetype in their stories — a beautiful girl who kills when she comes too close. More recently, the archetype has taken a new hue in the HIV/AIDS era, for example in Vishkanya, a 2007 novel, based on the AIDS epidemic in society. Vishakanyas have also been depicted as characters in the book Chanakya's Chant. In 2009, Vibha Rahi has written an autobiography 'Vishkanya: Untold Secrets' in Marathi, in which she portrays how upper caste women make intimate relationships with lower caste people of high profile and destroy their families and social relationships.

Over the years, many Hindi films have been made on the subject. The first film, the Vishakanya, was made in 1943, starring Leela Mishra, and more recently, Vishkanya, starring Pooja Bedi in the lead role. Vishkanya Ek Anokhi Prem Kahani is a soap opera TV series which aired on Zee TV; it starred Aishwarya Khare as Aparajita Ghosh, as the Vishakanya, in the main role.

In the story Beeshkanya, Sharadindu Bandyopadhyay wrote about a girl who was supposed to be a Vishkanya and was sent to Magadha in order to assassinate the members of Shaishunaga dynasty.

In The Real Life of Sebastian Knight the author Nabokov treats his affair with Irina Guadanini through allusions to the myth of the poison damsel. In the 2015 novel, The Entropy of Bones by Ayize Jama-Everett, the main character fights a group of the Vishakanya. The trope also appears in a set of Nathaniel Hawthorne's stories.

In 2017, Vishakanaya is also mentioned in the fiction book 'A Crown of Wishes' by Roshani Chokshi.

== See also ==
- Femme fatale
- "Rappaccini's Daughter"
- Nāga
- Poison Ivy
