= Vishkanya Ek Anokhi Prem Kahani =

Television series

- Genre: Supernatural
- Directed by: Alind Srivastava; Nissar Parvej
- Starring: Aishwarya Khare; Vin Rana
- Country of origin: India
- Original language: Hindi
- No. of seasons: 1
- No. of episodes: 143

Production
- Camera setup: Multi-camera
- Production company: Peninsula Pictures

Original release
- Network: Zee TV, &TV
- Release: 28 March – 16 September 2016

Vishkanya Ek Anokhi Prem Kahani or simply Vishkanya (lit. venomous girl) is a soap set in the old neighbourhood of the city of Kolkata. The show is about a love story of fictional characters Aparajita Ghosh and Malay Mittal.

== Plot ==
Aparajita, also known as Appu, is born as a Vishkanya, a venomous girl whose body is poisonous and could prove fatal to anyone upon contact. Initially, she was not aware that she was poisonous or that she was used as a pawn to destroy the Mittal family by her maternal aunt, Kalpana Ghosh, whom she believes to be her mother. Kalpana kept her locked in her room since she was a little girl, avoiding any contact with outsiders. This ignited curiosity among her neighbors, especially Malay.

The first time she was allowed out was for a party at the Mittal mansion, where she met Malay for the first time. Malay was instantly smitten by her beauty and delicate grace despite her mysterious aura. A series of events led Appu to begin questioning her true identity. She demanded answers from Kalpana about unexplained facts such as her skin turning blue whenever she was distressed. Kalpana revealed that she was a descendant of Vishkanya. For generations, daughters in her family were used as a weapon to destroy kingdoms and cities. Kalpana urged her to kill every member of the Mittal family, especially Malay, to hurt his mother. Years earlier, Malay's father married Kalpana despite already being married to Malay's mother, Nandita. Enraged, Nandita hired a man to kill Kalpana, but he mistakenly harmed Kalpana's sister and Appu’s mother, Niranjana, causing Malay's father and Niranjana to be paralyzed.

Kalpana swore revenge on Nandita Mittal by planning to make Malay fall in love with Appu and then dispose of him later. Appu was disturbed by this but could not bring herself to do as Kalpana asked and distanced herself from him. Malay, however, kept relentlessly pursuing her without knowing the reason. Against all odds, they both fell in love with each other, but Nandita plotted several schemes to separate them. Nandita hired her brothers to kill Appu and bury her to stop her from marrying Malay. They brutally tortured her and left her to die in acid underground.

In the end, Malay reluctantly married Vardaan due to a misunderstanding caused by his mother and under the influence of the rest of his family. In the sequence of events, Malay had a change of heart and began to love Vardaan, much to Appu's dismay, and he broke up with her afterward. Finally, Appu decided to seek revenge against the Mittal family for everything she had suffered. Through various tricks and with Kalpana's aid, Appu managed to marry Malay, but at this point he did not love her anymore and still remained unaware of her supernatural identity. Vardaan divorced Malay under the influence of Appu, and Malay was then forced to marry Appu. Vardaan saved Appu's life, and Appu decided to let Vardaan and Malay be together.

Appu told Vardaan about her supernatural identity. Just before Malay and Vardaan's wedding, Kasturi (assistant of Kala Saaya, the head of all evil) came to kill Appu, but Vardaan intervened and saved her. Appu managed to kill Kasturi. Before dying, Vardaan made Appu promise to take care of Malay.

The show then takes a three-month leap and introduces Mandira, Nandita's sister, who is killed by Kala Saaya.

Kala Saaya took Mandira's form and came to the Mittal mansion, where she killed Chiki, Avi's fiancée. Kala Saaya (who is made of smoke) called another assistant, Yakshini, who is the embodiment of lust. Yakshini came to the Mittal mansion as Laila, who was to marry Avi. Appu found them suspicious and managed to burn Yakshini's house, a tree (it is believed that a Yakshini's powers are in its house). Kala Saaya kidnapped Kalpana and ordered Appu to become intimate with Malay, as Appu's offspring would free her from an old-age curse and give her powers. Malay heard them talking, and Malay and Appu pretended that they had become intimate and faked Malay's death (as becoming intimate with a Vishkanya results in death). Appu told Kala Saaya to let her meet her aunt, and she agreed.

There, Appu killed Kala Saaya and decided to go to the Himalayas to spend her life there. Malay realized his love for Appu and stopped her. Then Baba (a priest) came with a rabbit and ordered Appu to kill it. Appu scratched it but nothing happened. Baba then told her that a goddess had taken the venom out of her body in return for Kala Saaya’s death and that she could now live in peace. Appu and Malay get married and live together happily.

== Cast and characters ==
=== Main ===
- Aishwarya Khare as Aparajita “Appu” Ghosh: A Vishkanya; Niranjana's daughter; Kalpana's niece and foster daughter; Arjun's ex-fiancée; Malay's wife
- Vin Rana as Malay Mittal: Nandita's son; Avi's cousin; Vardaan's ex-husband; Aparajita's husband

=== Recurring ===
- Rohini Banerjee as Kalpana Ghosh: Appu's aunt and foster mother; Tapur’s mother
- Prachi Sinha as Vardaan “Veda” Malay Mittal (formerly Sinha):Malay's ex and former wife
- Kashish Duggal Paul as Nandita Mittal: Malay's mother
- Ashlesha Sawant as Mandira / Kala Saaya
- Ekta Sharma as Kumkum Rasik Mittal: Avi's mother; Malay's aunt
- Amit Khanna as Rasik Mittal: Avi's father; Malay's uncle
- Simi Mukherjee as Niranjana Ghosh: Appu's mother; Kalpana’s sister
- Medha Bhattacharya as Tapur Ghosh: Kalpana’s daughter; Appu's cousin; Malay’s half-sister
- Gagan Singh as Avinash "Avi" Mittal: Malay's cousin
- Krishna Shetty as Arjun Jha: Appu's ex-fiancé
- Himani Shivpuri as Renu
- Nirmal Soni as Atosh: Malay's uncle
- Tanveer as Sunder: Malay's uncle
- Akash Pandey as Nigam: Malay's uncle
- Nishikant Dixit as Madan: Malay's uncle
- Annie Gill as Kanika: Malay's ex-fiancée
- Ekroop Bedi as Yakshini / Laila: Avi's fiancé
