= Deeya Chopra =

Indian television actress

- Born: 9 December 1985 (age 40); New Delhi, India
- Spouse: Ritchie Mehta (m. 2016)
- Parents: Ravi Chopra (father); Manju Chopra (mother)
- Relatives: Roshni Chopra (sister)

Deeya Chopra (born 9 December 1985) is an Indian television actress. She is the sister of Roshni Chopra, who is also an actress and television presenter. She was last seen in Zee TV's daily soap Mrs. Kaushik Ki Paanch Bahuein. In May 2012, she left the show as she had prior personal commitments. She was then replaced by Preet Kaur.

== Filmography ==
=== Television ===
Year	Serial	Role	Channel	Notes
2007-08	Love Story	Jhilmil	SAB TV	By Anurag Basu
2008	Left Right Left	Cadet Vidya Saxena	SAB TV	By DJ's a Creative Unit
2009	Hindi Hai Hum	Loveleen	Real TV	
2010	Na Aana Is Des Laado	Sonali	Colors TV	
2010	Rishta.com			
2010	Kashi – Ab Na Rahe Tera Kagaz Kora	Byjayanti	NDTV Imagine	
2010	Mann Kee Awaaz Pratigya	Anu	Star Plus	
2011-12	Mrs. Kaushik Ki Paanch Bahuein	Ria Kaushik	Zee TV	Replaced by Preet Kaur
2013	Chhanchhan	Purvi	Sony TV	Cameo
