= Sapna Babul Ka... Bidaai =

Indian television series

- Genre: Drama
- Created by: Director Kut's Productions
- Written by: Zama Habib; Garima Goyal; Virendra Shahaney; Aparna Shahaney; Anjali Bahura Misra; Bahnishikha Das; Reshma Khan; Sonali Jaffar; M P Anamika
- Directed by: Rajan Shahi; Romesh Kalra; Sunand Baranwal; Neeraj Baliyan; Sharad Pandey; Mayank Gupta; Ismail Umar Khan
- Creative directors: Shefali Lal; Madhura Rapsang; Richa Singh Gautam; Garima Dimri; Meet Kohli; RItu Goel
- Starring: See below
- Opening theme: "Bidaai" by Manish Tripathi
- Country of origin: India
- Original language: Hindi
- No. of seasons: 1
- No. of episodes: 739

Production
- Producer: Rajan Shahi
- Cinematography: Arjun Rao; Bappi Mangal
- Editor: Sameer Gandhi
- Running time: 25 minutes
- Production company: Director Kut's Productions

Original release
- Network: StarPlus
- Release: 8 October 2007 – 13 November 2010

Sapna Babul Ka... Bidaai is an Indian soap drama that aired from 8 October 2007 to 13 November 2010 on STAR Plus. It tells the story of a father and his two daughters and explores the social impacts of skin colour.

== Plot ==
Ragini and Sadhna are cousins where Sadhna’s mother dies due to her illness in the first few episodes, and Sadhna’s father is unable to save her owing to a lack of funds. Sadhana's father promises to fly to the USA in order to accumulate more wealth, and she is left with her maternal uncle, Prakashchand Sharma. Sadhana is now residing in Agra and her father is in California. Sadhana's father's greatest wish is to see her as a bride. Sadhana, on the other hand, is desperate to see her father. She succeeds to win Ragini's and Prakashchand’s hearts while living with the Sharmas. However, Ragini's mother, Kaushalya, is concerned because her daughter, Ragini, and Sadhana have different complexions. Eventually, Sadhana’s father decides to return from California and take her back to Udaipur. Everyone is ecstatic. However, a tragic twist of fate puts an end to all hope. Sadhana's father's plane crashes due to bad weather and he dies. Sadhana is devastated by the news. She eventually ends up staying with the Sharmas.

Meanwhile, efforts to find Ragini a groom are on. Ragini is having difficulty finding a suitable match given her dark complexion, as she is always rejected in favour of the lighter-skinned Sadhana. One proposal is eventually finalised, and Kaushalya and Ragini's maternal grandmother decide to keep Sadhana hidden. Sadhana eventually arrives at Ragini's wedding venue owing to unforeseen circumstances, and the boy's family rejects Ragini once more in favour of Sadhana, causing Kaushalya to attempt suicide, but Prakashchand saves her. Everything returns to normal slowly, as Ragini takes dancing lessons and Sadhana gets a job.

Sadhana begins working as a tutor at the Rajvansh family. Ranveer is one of the Rajvansh sons who studies in the USA and has returned for the time being. He has a mentally ill brother named Alekh. Vasundhara, Alekh's mother, believes that marriage will help Alekh improve. She decides on Sadhana as a bride and puts the proposal to her. But, Sadhana rejects the proposal citing the fact that Ragini, who is elder to her, has not been married yet. In the backdrop of all this, the Sharmas are facing serious financial difficulties and the possibility of losing their home. Vasundhara offers to help them out. Sadhana eventually agrees to marry Alekh, however, Sadhana also puts forth a demand of her own.

Sadhana demands that Vasundhara get Ranveer married to Ragini in exchange. She does so after witnessing Ranveer protecting Ragini's honour after few hooligans make fun of her dark complexion, and she believes that he will make a wonderful life partner for Ragini, and she for him.

At first, Vasundhara is affronted and rejects this demand right away. Then, Vasundhara deceives Sadhana by seemingly agreeing to her demand, but this was just a sham. She sends Ranveer back to the USA while Sadhana marries Alekh. Vasundhara offers to marry Ranveer and Ragini when the former returns. Sadhana marries Alekh, but Ragini and Ranveer's marriage does not work out as Ranveer falls in love with Sonia. Sonia, on the other hand, is revealed to be a gold digger who is just interested in Ranveer's money. Ranveer is devastated by this news and begins to stat depressed. In a strange twist of destiny, Ragini is the one who saves him when she dials his number by accident and tells him to move on with his life in wonderful words. Ranveer is completely charmed by her perspective, and the two gradually begin conversing on the phone on a regular basis, oblivious of each other's identities. They go by the names, Anmol, and Anamika. Sadhana eventually figures it out, but she does not reveal them and instead trusts God to decide the fate of their phone friendship. She, however, lets Alekh in on the secret.

Ranveer and Ragini slowly develop feelings for each other and resolve to meet. However, when they meet, they are both taken aback, and due to Vasundhara's interference (who always refused to accept Ragini as her daughter-in-law owing to her dark complexion), Ranveer believes Ragini was aware of his true identity all along, but chose to deceive him in order to marry into a wealthy family. Meanwhile, Ragini is taken aback when she learns that Ranveer is Anmol, and she is distraught when he seemingly appears to reject her. Sadhana knew about their true identities all along, and both, Ranveer, and Ragini, are disappointed in her for keeping it hidden from them.

However, misunderstandings eventually get cleared up after Ranveer realises that he truly loves Ragini when he learns that very much like him, she had no idea of his real identity and had truly loved him all along as well. He decides that his life is not complete without her and fights tooth and nail to win her love after leaving her heartbroken. Slowly but surely, their love wins over their families, especially their opposing mothers, and they eventually marry. After their marriage, they decide to help Sadhana cure Alekh so that she can experience a fulfilling marital life as well. They hire a therapist for Alekh, Shlok, who happens to have been an old friend of his, and improvements begin to show in Alekh's health until Alekh begins to think Sadhana and Shlok have feelings for each other. This manifests itself when Sadhana is shot in the streets and is attended to by Shlok. Meanwhile, Alekh and Sadhana’s families are planning a formal wedding for the two now that Alekh is showing improvement. However, at the wedding, Alekh tells Shlok that he would be a better husband for Sadhana and dresses him up as himself and tries to get him married to Sadhana. However, Shlok, wanting the best for Alekh, ends up revealing himself in the end and reunites him with Sadhana and they have a happy marriage. Ranveer starts investigating what happened with him a fateful Diwali night so he, Ragini, and Sadhana plan to recreate that Diwali night once again. Alekh relives it and remembers that Ambika killed his grandfather and was told by Ambika that his grandfather was killed by Vasundhara. Alekh feels very humiliated and apologizes to Vasundhra. The next day Ambika and Sathyen leave the Rajvansh house and Ambika curses that history will repeat itself and this time it will be Ragini and Sadhana. Slowly, Alekh starts living a normal life. So, they are successful in their quest. Misunderstandings develop between Sadhana and Alekh after his recovery, however, they get cleared up as it becomes clear that much like Ranveer and Ragini, Alekh and Sadhana are also made for one another. They all live happily together for a while. Ragini and Sadhana soon become pregnant and the whole family is overjoyed. However, nine months later, tragedy strikes as Sadhana dies in a bomb blast. The whole family is devastated by Sadhana's death. Ragini decides to raise Sadhana's daughter up as well along with hers.

=== 7 years later ===
Ragini is shown bringing her daughter Tamanna up along with Khushi, who is Sadhana's daughter. Ragini and the family commemorate the seventh anniversary of Sadhana's death. It is revealed that Ranveer died, too, in a rock avalanche while saving his friend Anmol's life. Anmol promised Ranveer to look after his family, therefore, he lives in the Rajvansh household as Ragini’s husband and Tamanna's father. After Sadhana and Ranveer's deaths, Alekh also loses his mental balance once again, but eventually recovers with the help of Shlok, and especially for his daughter. He also becomes close to a girl named Sakshi. The show ends with Anmol and Ragini, and Alekh and Sakshi, getting married. Both couples take deceased Ranveer and Sadhana’s blessings and perform the Bidaai (farewell) ritual.

== Cast ==
=== Main ===
- Parul Chauhan as Ragini Rajvansh: Kaushalya and Prakash's daughter; Vineet and Sadhana’s sister; Ranveer's widow; Anmol's wife; Tamanna's mother (2007–2010)
- Sara Khan as Sadhana Awasthy Rajvansh: Sulekha and Kishan's daughter; Ragini and Vineet’s sister. Alekh's first wife; Khushi's mother (2007–2010) (Dead)
- Kinshuk Mahajan as Ranveer Rajvansh: Vasundhara and Inderjit's younger son; Alekh's brother; Ragini's first husband; Tamanna's father (2008–2010) (Dead)
- Angad Hasija as Alekh Rajvansh: Vasundhara and Inderjit's elder son; Ranveer's brother; Sadhana's widower; Sakshi's husband; Khushi's father (2008–2010)
- Apurva Agnihotri as Anmol Sareen: Ranveer's friend; Ragini's second husband; Tamanna's step-father (2010)
- Sulagna Panigrahi as Sakshi Narang Rajvansh: Alekh's second wife; Khushi's step-mother (2010)

=== Recurring ===
- Nirali Desai as Tamanna Rajvansh: Ragini and Ranveer's daughter; Anmol's step-daughter; Khushi and Kavyansh's cousin (2010)
- Divya Naaz as Khushi Rajvansh: Sadhana and Alekh's daughter; Sakshi's step-daughter; Tamanna and Kavyansh's cousin (2010)
- Amardeep Jha as Sumitra Bajpai: Kaushalya's mother; Ragini and Vineet's grandmother; Kavyansh and Tamanna's great-grandmother (2007–2010)
- Mahesh Thakur as Kishan Chand Awasthy: Sulekha’s husband; Sadhana's father; Khushi's grandfather (2007)
- Alok Nath as Prakash Chandra Sharma: Sulekha’s brother; Kaushalya's husband; Ragini and Vineet's father; Sadhna’s maternal uncle; Kavyansh and Tamanna's grandfather (2007–2010)
- Vibha Chibber as Kaushalya Sharma: Prakash's wife; Ragini and Vineet's mother; Kavyansh and Tamanna's grandmother (2007–2010)
- Ashita Dhawan as Malti Sharma: Vineet's wife; Kaushalya and Prakash’s daughter in law; Ragini and Sadhana’s sister in law; Kavyansh's mother (2007–2010)
- Naveen Saini as Vineet Sharma: Kaushalya and Prakash's son; Ragini's brother; Sadhana's cousin; Malti's husband; Kavyansh's father (2007–2010)
- Siddharth Kumar as Kavyansh "Kavya" Sharma: Malti and Vineet's son; Tamanna and Khushi's cousin (2010)
- Shambhavi Sharma as Gujri: Servant at Kaushalya Nivas (2007–2008)
- Seema Kapoor as Vasundhara Rajvansh: Indrajeet's wife; Ranveer, Alekh and Dolly’s mother; Ambika’s younger sister; Tamanna and Khushi's grandmother (2008–2010)
- Avinash Wadhawan as Indrajeet Rajvansh: Vasundhara's husband; Ranveer, Alekh and Dolly’s father; Tamanna and Khushi's grandfather (2008–2010)
- Natasha Rana as Ambika Rajvansh: Satyen's wife; Naveen’s mother; Vasundhara’s elder sister (2008–2009)
- Aliraza Namdar as Satyendra (Satyen) Rajvansh: Indrajeet’s younger brother; Naveen’s father(2008–2009)
- Vimarsh Roshan as Naveen Rajvansh: Satyen and Ambika’s son; Guni and Pratham’s father; Avni’s husband (2008–2010)
- Preeti Puri as Avni Naveen Rajvansh (2008–2010)
- Rajeev Verma as Harshvardhan Rajvansh (Dadaji), Father of Inderjit and Satyen (2009)
- Sulakshana Khatri as Gayatri Devi (Bua Dadi), Harshvardhan's younger sister (2009)
- Sunita Shirole as the lady in Gayatri Devi's old age home (2009)
- Rahul Lohani as Karan Rajvansh, Inderjit and Kusum’s son (2010)
- Farida Dadi as Karan’s grandmother (2010)
- Navina Bole as Dolly Rajvansh (2009–10)
- Shafaq Naaz as Guni Rajvansh (2010)
- Shabana Mullani as Dolly Rajvansh: Vasundhara and Indrajeet’s daughter; Ranveer and Alekh’s sister (2008)
- Manish Raisinghan as Saket (2007)
- Utkarsha Naik as Sulakshana (2007)
- Kartik Sabharwal as Shailendra (2007)
- Rajendra Chawla as Kamlesh Awasthy, Sadhna's uncle, Kishanchand's brother (2007)
- Pragati Mehra as Sadhna's aunt, Kamlesh's wife (2007)
- Sheela Sharma as Sadhna’s aunt, Kamlesh’s sister (2007)
- Sadiya Siddiqui as Aradhana, Ragini's dance teacher (2007)
- Vishal Singh as Rajveer (2007)
- Rucha Gujarathi as Sonia (2007)
- Madhura Naik as Sonia Singh/ Sonia Chopra: Ranveer’s ex girlfriend (2008)
- Manish Naggdev as Shishir Tripathi (2008)
- Eva Grover as Sheetal Rai Singhania: Vasundhara’s best friend from Canada (2009)
- Payal Nair as Gayathri (2009)
- Anupam Bhattacharya as Madhavan (2009)
- Puneet Tejwani as Dr. Shlok: Alekh’s childhood friend; Malti’s cousin (2009)
- Aruna Singhal as Shakuntala; Malti’s mother (2009)
- Amar Upadhyay as Advocate Dhananjay Singhania (2009)
- Prerna Wanvari as Shivani (2010)
- Kamalika Guha Thakurta as Vidyashree Shasthry (2010)
- Rajshree Thakur as Nishtha Vasudev (2009)
- Smrity Sinha as Malika Mehra (2010)
- Amit Singh Thakur as Mr. Mehra (2010)
- Seerat Ain Alam as Isha (2010)
- Puneet Sachdev as Tarun (2010)
- Rajesh Khattar as Bittu: Malti’s cousin (2007)

=== Guests ===
- Hema Malini as chief guest of Taj Mahotsav (2008)
- Hansika Motwani as Chief Guest of Natraj Mahotsav (2010)
- Neha Bamb as herself from Maayka (2008)
- Dalljiet Kaur as herself from Santaan (2008)
- Additi Gupta as Heer from Kis Desh Mein Hai Meraa Dil (2009)
- Harshad Chopda as Prem Juneja from Kis Desh Mein Hai Meraa Dil (2009)
- Puja Banerjee as Vrinda from Tujh Sang Preet Lagai Sajna (2009)
- Drashti Dhami as Geet from Geet – Hui Sabse Parayi (2010)
- Gurmeet Choudhary as Maan from Geet – Hui Sabse Parayi (2010)
- Karan Tacker as Shantanu from Rang Badalti Odhani (2010)
- Hina Khan as Akshara from Yeh Rishta Kya Kehlata Hai (2010)
- Karan Mehra as Naitik from Yeh Rishta Kya Kehlata Hai (2010)
- Ragini Khanna as Suhana from Sasural Genda Phool (2010)
- Jay Soni as Ishaan from Sasural Genda Phool (2010)
- Pooja Gor as Pratigya from Mann Kee Awaaz Pratigya (2010)
- Manasi Parekh as Gulaal to promote the show Zindagi Ka Har Rang... Gulaal (2010)
- Vivian Dsena as Abhayendra "Abhay" Raichand from "Pyaar Kii Ye Ek Kahaani" (2010)
- Sukirti Kandpal as Priyal "Priya" Dobriyal Raichand from "Pyaar Kii Ye Ek Kahaani" (2010)
- Akshay Kumar from Tees Maar Khan (2010)
- Katrina Kaif from Tees Maar Khan (2010)
- Abhishek Bachchan from " Dostana" (2008)
- John Abraham from "Dostana " (2008)
- Ranbir Kapoor from " Bachna Ae Haseeno" (2008)
- Deepika Padukone from " Bachna Ae Haseeno (2008)
- Shahrukh Khan from " Ra.One" (2011)
- Kareena Kapoor from " Ra.One" (2011)
- Hrithik Roshan from " Agneepath" (2012)
- Barun Sobti as Arnav Singh Raizada from Iss Pyaar Ko Kya Naam Doon (2011)
- Sanaya Irani as Khushi Gupta Singh Raizada from Iss Pyaar Ko Kya Naam Doon (2011)
- Emraan Hashmi from Murder 2 (2011)
- Jacqueline Fernandez from Murder 2 (2011)
- Ajay Devgn from "Singham" (2011)
- Kajal Aggarwal from "Singham" (2011)
- Karan Tacker as Viren from Ek Hazaaron Mein Meri Behna Hai (2012)
- Kushal Tandon as Virat from Ek Hazaaron Mein Meri Behna Hai (2012)
- Krystle D'Souza as Jeevika from Ek Hazaaron Mein Meri Behna Hai (2012)
- Nia Sharma as Maanvi from Ek Hazaaron Mein Meri Behna Hai (2012)
- Saif Ali Khan from " Agent Vinod" (2012)
- Aditya Roy Kapoor from Aashiqui 2 (2013)
- Shraddha Kapoor from Aashiqui 2 (2013)
- Anas Rashid as Sooraj from Diya Aur Baati Hum (2013)
- Deepika Singh Goyal as Sandhya from Diya Aur Baati Hum (2013)
- Mohammad Nazim as Ahem from Saath Nibhaana Saathiya (2014)
- Jennifer Winget as Kumud Desai Vyas from Saraswatichandra (2014)
- Gautam Rode as Saraswatichandra Vyas from Saraswatichandra (2014)
- Varun Kapoor as Danny Vyas from Saraswatichandra (2014)
- Shiny Doshi as Kusum Desai Vyas from Saraswatichandra (2014)
- Ashish Kapoor as Kabir Vyas from Saraswatichandra (2014)
- Srishty Rode as Anushka Vyas from Saraswatichandra (2014)
- Devoleena Bhattacharjee as Gopi from Saath Nibhaana Saathiya (2014)
- Karan Patel as Raman Bhalla from Yeh Hai Mohabbatein (2014)
- Divyanka Tripathi as Ishita Iyer Bhalla from Yeh Hai Mohabbatein (2014)
- Avinash Sachdev as Shlok Agnigotri from Iss Pyaar Ko Kya Naam Doon? Ek Baar Phir (2014)
- Shrenu Parikh as Astha Shlok Agnigotri from Iss Pyaar Ko Kya Naam Doon? Ek Baar Phir (2014)
- Sidharth Malhotra from Ek Villain (2014)
- Shraddha Kapoor from Ek Villain (2014)
- Priyanka Chopra from Gunday (2014)
- Ranveer Singh from Gunday (2014)
- Arjun Kapoor from Gunday (2014)
- Parineeti Chopra from " Hasee Toh Phasee" (2014)

== Adaptations ==
Language	Title	Original release	Network(s)	Last aired	Notes
Tamil	Pirivom Santhippom பிரிவோம் சந்திப்பொம்	4 April 2011	Star Vijay	4 May 2012	Remake
Marathi	Pathrakhin पाठराखीण	1 June 2026	Star Pravah	Ongoing	Remake

== Production ==
=== Development ===
Bidaai is the first offering of Producer Rajan Shahi under Director's Kut Production. The initial phase of the series is inspired from the Bollywood film Vivah of Rajshri Productions.

=== Casting ===
Speaking about his role, male lead Angad Hasija said, "My character Alekh was a Schizophrenic. Initially, I had a problem, but I really worked hard to build the character," Initially, Hasija was rejected for the role by Producer Rajan Shahi considering his long hair and physique appearance not suitable. After working on those, Shahi accepted him for the role of Alekh.

In October 2007, shooting of the series was stalled for a while when the Labour Union protested for hiring men for erecting the sets from outside rather than the members from the Film Studio Setting and Allied Mazdoor Union as per the rules.

In October 2008, a special sequence of celebrating Taj Mahotsav was shot in Agra where Hema Malini was roped for a guest appearance as the chief guest of the event. Besides, Shweta Tiwari and Anjali Abrol appeared as the performers of that event and Vivan Bhatena also made a special appearance for the event.

In November 2008, the shootings and telecast of all the Hindi television series including this series and films were stalled on 8 November 2008 due to dispute by the technician workers of FWICE (Federation of Western India Cine Employees) for increasing the wages, better work conditions and more breaks between shootings. FWICE first took a strike on 1 October 2008 when they addressed their problems with the producers and production was stalled. A contract was signed after four days discussions and shooting were happening only for two hours content in a day then after which differences increased between them while channels gave them time until 30 October 2008 to sort it out. Failing to do so lead to protests again from 10 November 2008 to 19 November 2008 during which channels blacked out new broadcasts and repeat telecasts were shown from 10 November 2008. On 19 November 2008, the strike was called off after settling the disputes and the production resumed. The new episodes started to telecast from 1 December 2008. Shahi reported about ₹7 Lakh losses due to the stalling of production and telecast.

In December 2009, the shoot of the series was stalled for three hours due to the morcha by some group of women when the lead sisters Sadhna and Ragini were shown developing differences between them in their marital home in the series which they condemned. However, they were pacified by Producer Rajan Shahi, Sara Khan and Parul Chauhan playing Sadhna and Ragini and the shootings resumed.

In January 2009, Eva Grover was cast as Sheetal for a small cameo. Good response her role made it to be extended. In February 2009, the honeymoon track of the characters Sadhna and Alekh, Ragini and Ranbir was filmed in Kerala where Payal Nair and Anupam Bhattacharya were cast as Gayathri and Madhavan for a cameo. Initially they were supposed to go to Switzerland for the honeymoon sequence which could not as Sara Khan playing Sadhna did not have passport and time to arrange for it which was required soon and Kerala was finalized for it. A sequence during the last day shoot in a beach in Kerala was stalled in between due to dispute between the production unit and the local fishermen there and thus being cut during telecast.

In February 2010, film actress Hansika Motwani was seen in a cameo as the chief guest of the dance competition event Natraj Mahotsav in the series. Besides Mouli Ganguly played the cameo of host, Sangita Ghosh and Sanjeeda Sheikh being the performers in the event. In June 2010, to increase the ratings, one of the main characters was killed, causing Sara Khan to exit the series. Soon, when a generation leap followed, one of the male leads Kinshuk Mahajan quit where his character was also killed and Apurva Agnihotri was cast as the new male lead opposite Parul Chauhan. Following it, in August 2010 Sulagna Panigrahi was cast as Sakshi opposite Hasija.

=== Filming ===
The series is based on the backdrop of Agra. The series was mainly filmed in Mumbai at the sets in Mira Road. Besides, some scenes were filmed in and on the outskirts of Agra including Taj Mahal.

=== Cancellation ===
The end of the series was first planned six months before it went off air when the ratings were declining. Otherwise, shifting it to an afternoon slot was not considered as they thought it might degrade its popularity. The channel prompted the producer to introduce twists like the death of the character Sadhna and a time leap after which the ratings rose. However, the series went off air on 13 November 2010. Speaking about the reason for ending, executive director of Star channel Vivek Bahl stated: "The show has run its course, and both, the channel and the producer, didn't feel the need to stretch the story. We didn't want to end the show once the number started falling. Bidaai has been a top show, and deserves to go like a top show," Producer Rajan Shahi stated that they wanted the series to end on a high note.

After its end, there were also many reports for the second season being in progress. However Shahi denied it.

== Crossover ==
In 2009, they had a crossover episode with Yeh Rishta Kya Kehlata Hai. Gulaal which replaced the series in its slot had a crossover with it during the end of Bidaai.

== Reception ==
=== Critics ===
On Bidaai's success, The Telegraph stated, "Bidaai didn't turn out to be too hatke (out of the box), but the identifiable characters and slice-of-life situations struck a chord."

Praising the two shows Bidaii and Yeh Rishta Kya Kehlata Hai of Rajan Shahi's Director's Kut Production as game changers of Starplus which do not have excessive camera moves and mother in law – daughter in law melodramas unlike previously aired dramas, The Times of India stated, "The shows adequately highlighted the quintessential emotions with loads of romanticism and simplicity in story-telling."

=== Ratings ===
Bidaai started off with 4.7 TVR during its premiere in October 2007 featuring in top 10 shows. Soon, in December 2007, it rose 5.4 TVR.

It also became the first Hindi GEC to beat Kyunki Saas Bhi Kabhi Bahu Thi to the top position at that time garnering 5.28 TVR during first week January 2008. Until March 2008, it shuffled in and out of top ten shows. In March 2008, it got 6 TVR on one of the leads Sadhana and Alekh's wedding track. Since April 2008 to September 2008, it was consistently the number one series except twice in June 2008, when it was pushed to second by Kyunki Saas Bhi Kabhi Bahu Thi and Star Parivaar Awards. In the week during 5 to 11 October 2008, it was second most watched after Balika Vadhu with 6 TVR. Its highest rating garnered in the year was 8.8 TVR for the Taj Mahotsav sequence in October 2008. In November 2008 overall, it was the second most watched Hindi show with averaging between 5 and 6 TVR.

In January 2009, it recorded its highest rating of 9.6 TVR during lead characters Ragini and Ranveer's marriage. In week 9 of 2009, it occupied second position with 6.3 TVR. When the nine-year dominant number one position of StarPlus channel was beaten by Colors TV channel in week ending 11 April 2009, Bidaai and Yeh Rishta Kya Kehlata Hai were the top watched Hindi shows with 7.4 and 7 TVR. Overall in the year, it was the third most watched with 9.5 TVR.

As in February 2010, it maintained its top position with 5 to 6 TVR. In early March, it occupied second position after Yeh Rishta with 6.8 TVR. Until June 2010, it ranged between 5 and 7 TVR. However, when the series took a leap in June 2010, ratings dipped and it went out of top 5 watched Hindi programs to 10th position. Between June and July it ranged between 2 and 5 TVR. From October to November 2010 it ranged 2 to 3 TVR while the last episode of two hours duration aired on 13 November 2010 garnered 6.06 TVR, becoming the second most watched Hindi GEC in that week.

== Impact ==
Writer Shoma Munshi in their book Prime time soap operas on Indian Television had included the series among her five specific serials chosen for analysis stating, "I chose Saat Phere… Saloni Ka Safar and Sapna Babul Ka… Bidaai as a counterfoil, because they were the first to challenge the K soaps' supremacy, and both were issue-based, focusing on the dark skin/fair skin thesis."

In January 2008, creative head of Zee TV and the writer of Saat Phere: Saloni Ka Safar accused Bidaai as a copy of Saat Phere, where both of them deals with the story of a dark complexion girl with different story lines for which Producer Rajan Shahi stated, "Why is the comparison being made after four months of Bidaai's launch? Is it because our show is doing better?".

Dialogue from the episode aired on 6 October 2009, was said by Angad Hasija on Valmiki to have offended the Valmiki community and the series telecast had a black out in Punjab for 2 months. When Punjab police came to arrest the actor and Producer Rajan Shahi after a FIR was filed on them, but they got interim bail. In September 2009, Information and broadcasting ministry sent a notice to Star regarding it. When Star and Producer approached Punjab and Haryana High Court to quash the FIR stating that they did not intend to hurt the feelings of Valmiki Community and the FIR was due to the out of context misinterpretation of that dialogue. However, court dismissed their queries and stated them to face the trial. When it was taken over to Supreme court, they also dismissed stating the same. Later, on arguments in the court, the FIR was finally quashed and the petition was dismissed.
