= Sara Khan (actress, born 1989) =

Indian television actress (born 1989)

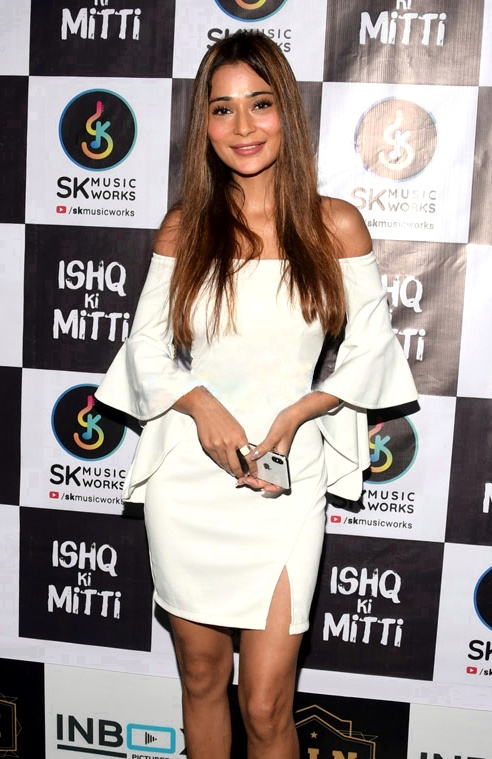
- Khan in 2019
- Born: Sara Khan; 6 August 1989 (age 37); Bhopal, Madhya Pradesh, India
- Citizenship: Indian
- Education: University of Mumbai
- Occupations: Actress; Model
- Years active: 2007–present
- Spouse(s): Ali Merchant (m. 2010; div. 2011) Krish Pathak (m. 2025)

Sara Khan (born 6 August 1989) is an Indian actress and model who primarily works in Hindi films and television. Her notable work includes Sapna Babul Ka... Bidaai, Preet Se Bandhi Ye Dori Ram Milaayi Jodi, Sasural Simar Ka, among others. Besides this, she won Miss Bhopal 2007 and participated in Bigg Boss 4, and has received a ITA Award and an Indian Telly Award.

== Early life ==
Khan was born on 6 August 1989 in Bhopal, India. Khan is a Sunni Muslim. She has a sister, Ayra Khan.

== Career ==
=== Television ===
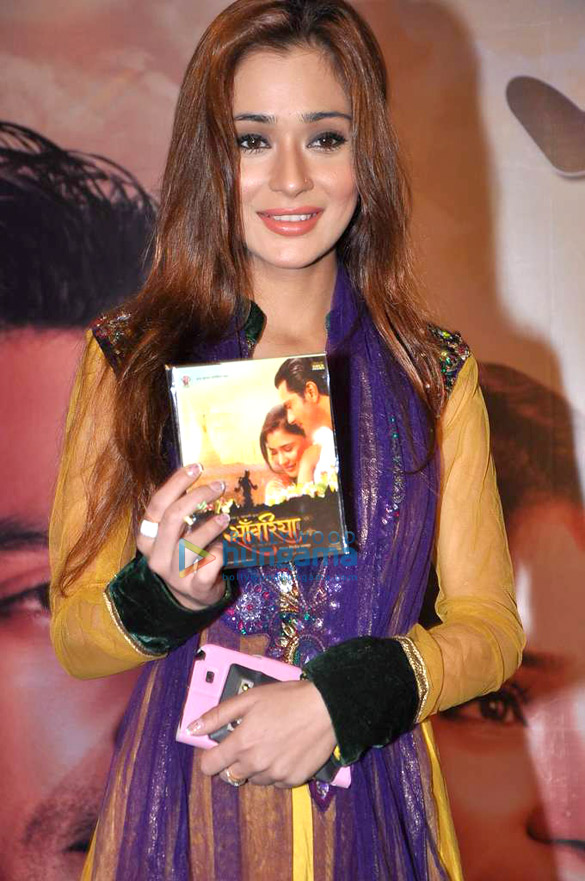
Khan at a music launch in 2013

Khan started her career as a model. She made her acting debut with the popular Star Plus show Sapna Babul Ka...Bidaai (2007–2010) as Sadhna opposite Angad Hasija. She quit the show in June 2010 which remarked the end of her character. Khan then appeared in the Zee TV show Preet Se Bandhi Ye Dori Ram Milaayi Jodi (2010–2012) as Mona where she replaced Priyal Gor.

In 2013, Khan made her entry in the Life OK serial Junoon – Aisi Nafrat Toh Kaisa Ishq as Shaalu Pandey. She then played the role of Maya, an Icchhadhari Naagin in the popular Colors TV show Sasural Simar Ka (2014–2015). She was also seen in shows like V The Serial, Pyaar Tune Kya Kiya, Encounter and Tujhse Hi Rabta.

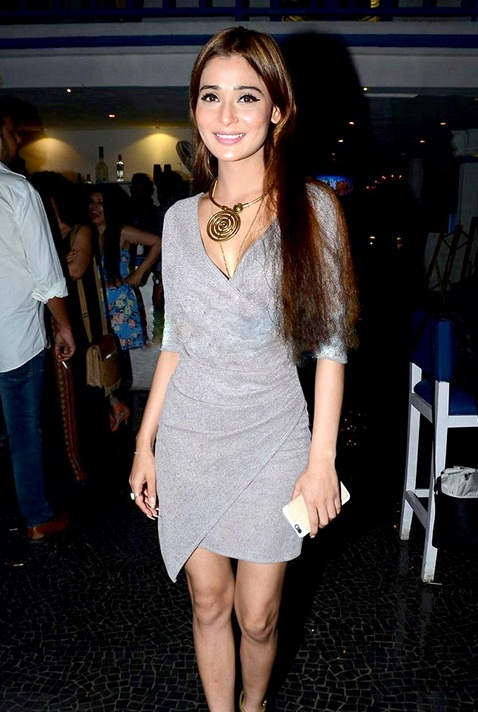
Khan in 2015

In 2015, Sara played Pavitra in &TV's Bhagyalaxmi. In 2016, she played Kuhu in &TV's Saubhagyalakshmi. In 2017, Khan did a cameo role in Star Plus's Dil Boley Oberoi as Mohini. She was then seen in the Star Plus show Jaana Na Dil Se Door as Kangana.

=== Reality television and other appearances ===
In 2008, Khan appeared as a guest contestant on the show Kya Aap Paanchvi Pass Se Tez Hain?, along with Parul Chauhan who plays her onscreen sister in Sapna Babul Ka...Bidaai. The two of them played the game and then donated the winnings to the charity Help Age India. She also appeared in Amul Star Voice of India 2 alongside Angad Hasija, Parul Chauhan, and Kinshuk Mahajan on 20 September 2008 as a celebrity guest. She appeared on the popular TV show 10 Ka Dum, hosted by Salman Khan in August 2009 and hosted Dance Premier League, a dancing reality show that aired on Sony TV. In 2010, Khan was a contestant on Bigg Boss 4, the Indian version of the reality TV show Big Brother and stayed in the show for 10 weeks until she got evicted on Day 69.

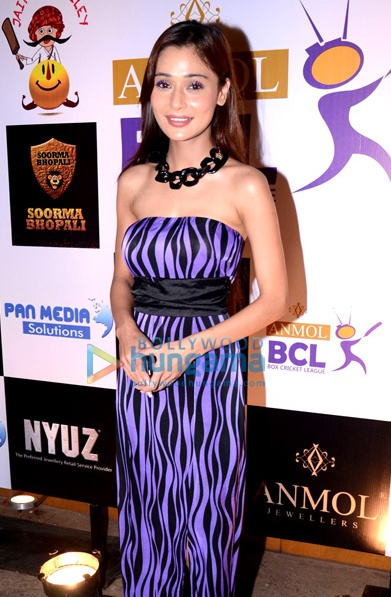
Khan at Box Cricket League success party in 2014

In 2013, Khan appeared in Life OK's Welcome – Baazi Mehmaan-Nawaazi Ki as a contestant and later went on to host the show BIG Fame Star. She also appeared in Nach Baliye 6 along with Paras Chhabra as a wildcard contestant but couldn't get selected. In 2014, Khan was seen in Ekta Kapoor's Box Cricket League. She also appeared in two comedy shows Comedy Classes and Comedy Nights Bachao. In 2018, Khan appeared in the music video Tere Jism with Angad Hasija.

In July 2022, she entered Colors TV's Spy Bahu as Ahana. From 2022 to 2023, she portrayed Tanya Rastogi in Dangal TV's Palkon Ki Chhaon Mein 2.

== Personal life ==
Khan was married to TV actor Ali Merchant, a Shia Muslim in an Islamic wedding ceremony at Bigg Boss 4 in 2010, but divorced him after two months in 2011. Close friends of the couple stated that the couple was paid ₹5 million (US$53,000) for the marriage. The channel denied that it had paid them for the marriage and called it their personal wish. After the divorce she called the marriage a nightmare. Merchant said in an episode of the reality show Sach Ka Saamna that he had married for publicity and that marrying Khan was the biggest mistake of his life.

On 6 October 2025, Khan married actor Krish Pathak in a court marriage ceremony, in Mumbai.

== Filmography ==
=== Films ===
Key
†	Denotes films that have not yet been released

Year	Title	Role	Notes	Ref.
2013	Saanwariya - Khatu Shyam Ji Ki Amar Gatha	Meera		
2014	Dark Rainbow	Ruhi		
2014	M3 – Midsummer Midnight Mumbai	Sapna		
2015	Tujh Se Hee Raabta	Anum	Pakistani telefilm	
2015	Hamari Adhuri Kahani	Naila		
2022	Cyanide	Anjum		
2023	The Era of 1990	Sara		
2025	Shaila	Shaila		
TBA	Camp Decent †	TBA	Filming	

=== Television ===
Year	Title	Role	Notes	Ref.
2007–2010	Sapna Babul Ka... Bidaai	Sadhana Rajvansh		
2008	Zara Nachke Dikha	Contestant	Winner	
2008	Nach Baliye 4	Host		
2009	Dance Premier League	host		
2009	Hans Baliye	Contestant		
2009	10 Ka Dum	Contestant		
2010	Bigg Boss 4	Contestant	Evicted on Day 70	
2010–2012	Preet Se Bandhi Ye Dori Ram Milaayi Jodi	Mona Gandhi		
2012	V The Serial	Herself		
2013	Welcome – Baazi Mehmaan Nawazi Ki	Contestant		
2013	Pyaar Tune Kya Kiya	Shamona		
2013	BIG Fame Star	Host		
2013	Rangoli	Host		
2013	Junoon – Aisi Nafrat Toh Kaisa Ishq	Shaalu Pandey		
2013	Nach Baliye 6	Contestant	Not selected	
2014	Encounter	Ayesha Raza		
2014	Savdhaan India – India Fights Back	Savitri		
2014–2015	Box Cricket League 1	Contestant		
2014–2015	Sasural Simar Ka	Maya		
2015	Bhagyalaxmi	Pavitra		
2015	Killerr Karaoke Atka Toh Latkah	Contestant		
2015	Comedy Nights Bachao	Contestant		
2015	Comedy Classes	Sadhana		
2016	Comedy Classes	Herself		
2016	Saubhagyalakshmi	Kuhu		
2016	Box Cricket League 2	Contestant		
2016	Kavach...Kaali Shaktiyon Se	Manjulika		
2016	Woh Teri Bhabhi Hai Pagle	Naughty Naagin		
2016–2017	Bay Khudi	Fiza	Pakistani television series	
2017	Dil Boley Oberoi	Mohini		
2017	Laikin	Hadia	Pakistani television series	
2017	Jaana Na Dil Se Door	Kangana / Tara		
2017–2018	Shakti – Astitva Ke Ehsaas Ki	Mohini		
2018	Box Cricket League 3	Contestant		
2018	Woh Apna Sa	Rano		
2018	Laal Ishq	Mallika		
2019	Namah	Mrityu		
2020–2021	Santoshi Maa – Sunayein Vrat Kathayein	Devi Poulomi		
2022	Lock Upp	Contestant	Evicted on Day 28	
2022	Bhabhi Ke Pyaare Pritam Hamare	Sara Khan (Episode 2)		
2022	Spy Bahu	Ahana		
2022–2023	Palkon Ki Chhaon Mein 2	Tanya Rastogi		
2024–2025	Chhathi Maiyya Ki Bitiya	Kritika		

==== Special appearances ====
Year	Title	Role	Notes
2007	Star Voice of India	Sadhna	
2007	Kasautii Zindagii Kay	Sadhna	
2007	Kyunki Saas Bhi Kabhi Bahu Thi	Sadhna	
2007	Kumkum – Ek Pyara Sa Bandhan	Sadhna	
2008	Kya Aap Paanchvi Pass Se Tez Hain?	Sadhna	
2008	Jo Jeeta Wohi Super Star	Sadhna	
2008	Kahaani Ghar Ghar Kii	Sadhna	
2008	Karam Apnaa Apnaa	Sadhna	
2008	Kayamath	Sadhna	
2009	Perfect Bride	Sadhna	
2009	Yeh Rishta Kya Kehlata Hai	Sadhna	
2009	Mann Kee Awaaz Pratigya	Sadhna	
2010	Sajan Ghar Jaana Hai	Sadhna	
2010	Raja Ki Aayegi Baraat	Sadhna	
2010	Sasural Genda Phool	Sadhna	
2010	Saath Nibhaana Saathiya	Sadhna	
2010	Baat Hamari Pakki Hai	Herself	
2011	Chotti Bahu – Sawar Ke Rang Rachi	Mona	
2011	Pavitra Rishta	Mona	
2011	Sanjog Se Bani Sangini	Mona	
2012	Yahaaan Main Ghar Ghar Kheli	Mona	
2012	Mrs. Kaushik Ki Paanch Bahuein	Mona	
2013	Punar Vivaah	Mona	
2013	Sapne Suhane Ladakpan Ke	Herself	
2014	Madhubala – Ek Ishq Ek Junoon	Herself	
2015	Shastri Sisters: Chaar Dil Ek Dhadkan	Maya	
2015	Gangaa	Pavitra	
2016	Kaala Teeka	Herself	
2016	Sarojini	Herself	
2016	Santoshi Maa	Anju	
2016	Akbar Birbal	Shaila Bano	
2017	Bakula Bua Ka Bhoot	Laila	
2018	Ishq Mein Marjawan	Mohini	
2018	Tu Aashiqui	Mohini	
2019	Vidya	Herself	

=== Music videos ===
Year	Title	Singer(s)	Ref.
2021	Mod De Yaara	Herself, Rohil Bhatia	

== Accolades ==
Year	Award	Category	Work	Result	Ref.
2008	Indian Television Academy Awards	Best Actress - Popular	Sapna Babul Ka...Bidaai	Won	
2008	Indian Telly Awards	Best Actress in a Lead Role	Sapna Babul Ka...Bidaai	Won	
2008	Indian Telly Awards	Fresh New Face – Female	Sapna Babul Ka...Bidaai	Nominated	
2008	Gold Awards	Best Actress in a Lead Role	Sapna Babul Ka...Bidaai	Nominated	
2008	Gold Awards	Debut in a Lead Role – Female	Sapna Babul Ka...Bidaai	Nominated	
2009	Indian Television Academy Awards	Best Actress - Popular	Sapna Babul Ka...Bidaai	Nominated	

== See also ==
- List of Hindi television actresses
