= Bhagyalakshmi (2015 TV series) =

Indian television series

- Title screen
- Genre: Indian soap opera Romance
- Creative director: Raaga Arif
- Starring: Anupriya Kapoor; Simran Pareenja; Sara Khan; Varun Sharma
- Country of origin: India
- Original language: Hindi
- No. of seasons: 2
- No. of episodes: Season 1: Bhagyalaxmi: 220; Season 2: Saubhagyalakshmi: 46

Production
- Producers: Rashmi Sharma; Pawan Kumar Marut
- Production locations: Indore; Mumbai
- Camera setup: Multi-camera
- Running time: Approx. 22 minutes
- Production company: Rashmi Sharma Telefilms Limited

Original release
- Network: &TV
- Release: 2 March 2015 – 1 January 2016

Related
- Saubhagyalakshmi

Bhagyalakshmi (International Title: Lady Luck) is a daily soap opera that airs on Zee Network's Hindi entertainment channel &TV. It premiered on 2 March 2015 and ran till 1 January 2016.

A second season of the show, post a generation leap, was aired on the same channel and time slot of 8pm from 4 January 2016 and was titled Saubhagyalakshmi.

== Plot ==
Bhoomi Agrawal is a bubbly young woman, who wants to be independent in life. She is forced to choose between her personal or professional life after marrying Anshuman Prajapati, the son of a rich traditional family. Through a twist of events, Bhoomi is assumed dead, but in fact alive, she hires a woman, Divya Nair, to take her responsibilities in Prajapati household, as she doesn't want them to know about her death. Divya and Maan pretend to the family that Divya is in fact Bhoomi as Bhoomi's death was likely to destroy the entire family. However, as Maan and Divya start falling in love though unable to forget Bhoomi, Maan accepts his feelings for Divya later they consummate their relationship. Divya's former husband Yuvraj used to abuse her, and threatens to destroy their happy family to get Divya back who has now built a relationship with Maan. Meanwhile, the real Bhoomi who is shown to be in a coma in a critical condition, and gives birth to her and Maan's daughter Muskaan but Yuvraj kills Bhoomi.

Maan and Divya continue keeping her secret from the Prajapati family. Divya becomes pregnant with Maan's child but Yuvraj returns and vows to destroy the Prajapati Family. The show ends with Yuvraj murdering all the members of the Prajapati family except Badi Maa who survived at the shootout. Badi Maa is shocked when Yuvraj exposes Divya's true identity of not being the real Bhoomi. After Yuvraj shoots Maan and Divya, Badi Maa manages to kill him. A dying Divya gives birth to a daughter. Badi Maa, despite her hate for Divya and that her past life brought a disaster for her family, decides to leave with Muskaan and her other granddaughter (Divya's daughter) who she sees as Maan's blood.

== Cast ==
=== Main ===
- Varun Sharma as Anshumaan "Maan" Prajapati: Lata and Agreem's son; Surbhi and Pavitra's brother; Bhoomi and Divya's husband; Muskaan and Kavya's father (2015–2016)
- Simran Pareenja as Bhoomi Shukla Prajapati: Vijendra and Dhara's daughter; Murlimanohar and Shanti's granddaughter; Varun's cousin; Anshumaan's first wife; Muskaan's mother (2015–2016)
- Anupriya Kapoor as Divya Nair Malhotra / Prajapati: Yuvraj's ex-wife; Anshuman's second wife; Kavya's mother (2015–2016)

=== Recurring ===
- Aruna Irani as Badi Maa/Vasundhara Prajapati: Matriarch of the Prajapati family; Anshumaan, Surbhi and Pavitra's aunt (2015–2016)
- Sara Khan as Pavitra Prajapati Shukla: Vasundhara's daughter; Surbhi and Anshuman's sister; Varun's second wife; Kuhu's mother (2015–2016)
- Chetan Hansraj / Manish Goel as Yuvraj Malhotra: Divya's first husband (2015) / (2015–2016)
- Barkha Singh as Surbhi Prajapati Shukla: Suman and Inder's daughter; Pavitra and Anshuman's sister; Varun's first wife (2015–2016)
- Abhishek Malik as Dr. Varun Shukla: Surbhi and Pavitra's husband; Kuhu's father (2015–2016)
- Ashita Dhawan as Suman Prajapati: Inder's wife; Surbhi's mother (2015–2016)
- Aliraza Namdar as Agreem Prajapati: Inder's elder brother; Lata's husband; Anshumaan's father; Muskaan, Kavya and Kuhu's grandfather (2015–2016)
- Shweta Gautam as Lata Prajapati: Agreem's wife; Anshumaan, Surbhi and Pavitra's mother; Muskaan, Kavya and Kuhu's grandmother (2015–2016)
- Anil Dhawan as Murlimanohar Shukla: Shanti's husband; Bhoomi, Avni and Varun's grandfather (2015)
- Rita Bhaduri as Shanti Shukla: Murlimanohar's wife; Rajendra and Vijendra's mother; Bhoomi, Avni and Varun's grandmother
- Chetanya Adib as Vijendra Shukla: Rajendra's younger brother; Dhara's husband; Bhoomi's father
- Sanjeev Jotangia as Rajendra Shukla: Murlimanohar and Shanti's elder son; Janaki's husband; Avni and Varun's father
- Shalini Arora as Janaki Shukla: Dhara's elder sister; Avni and Varun's mother
- as Dhara Shukla: Janaki's younger sister; Bhoomi's mother
- Akanksha Chamola as Avni Shukla: Varun's elder sister
- Sumit Verma as Vikram: Sharad's son; Avni's husband
- Gulfam Khan as Kaveri
- Saurabh Agarwal as Inder Prajapati: Agreem's younger brother; Suman's husband; Surbhi's father
- Hemant Choudhary as Sharad: Vikram's father
