= Swati Bajpai =

Indian television actress

- Born: Mumbai, Maharashtra, India
- Occupation: Television actress

Swati Bajpai is an Indian television actress. She is best known for portraying Nimmi Kaushik in Mrs. Kaushik Ki Paanch Bahuein.

== Career ==
She was first seen in Imagine TV's popular dance class show Nachle Ve with Saroj Khan, hosted by popular Bollywood choreographer Saroj Khan, as one of Khan's students. She was also seen as a contestant in the matchmaking reality show Lux Perfect Bride in 2009. Bajpai then acted in Zee TV's daily soap Mrs. Kaushik Ki Paanch Bahuein for almost two years. According to some reports, she was also approached for Bigg Boss 7.

== Television ==
Year	Show	Role	Channel	Notes
2008–2009	Nachle Ve with Saroj Khan	Herself	NDTV Imagine	Student
2008	Raju Hazir Ho	Herself	NDTV Imagine	Host
2009	Lux Perfect Bride	Herself	Star Plus	Contestant
2011–2013	Mrs. Kaushik Ki Paanch Bahuein	Nimmi Bittu Kaushik	Zee TV	
2016–2017	Waaris	Raavi Pawania	&TV	
