= Mrs. Kaushik Ki Paanch Bahuein =

- Created by: Rashmi Sharma Telefilms
- Written by: Ved Raj, Abhijit Sinha, Garima Goyal
- Creative director: Rashmi Sharma
- Starring: See Below
- Opening theme: Mrs. Kaushik Ki Paanch Bahuein by Bela Shende
- Country of origin: India
- Original language: Hindi
- No. of episodes: 437

Production
- Producers: Rashmi Sharma; Pawan Kumar Marut
- Running time: 25 minutes
- Production company: Rashmi Sharma Telefilms Limited

Original release
- Network: Zee TV
- Release: 20 June 2011 – 15 March 2013

Mrs Kaushik Ki Paanch Bahuein (eng: Mrs Kaushik's Five Daughters-In-law) is an Indian television series that aired on Zee TV, from 20 June 2011, to 15 March 2013.

== Plot ==
The story revolves around an upper middle-class Rajasthani joint family called the Kaushiks living in Jaipur. Bindeshwari Kaushik runs a tight ship at home with her husband, their five sons, and the wives of four of them. Her youngest son, Karthik, is the apple of her eye and falls in love with the carefree Lovely.

Kartik's older brothers – Utkarsh and Bittu – run the family-owned ration shop while Shivendu and his wife Simran are police officers. Aditya works separately after returning from London. Utkarsh's wife Gehna is obedient and submissive who spends most of her time managing the kitchen. Bittu's wife Nimmi is clear-hearted and cheerful while Aditya's wife Ria is still learning Mrs. Kaushik's rules having come from London. Lovely and Karthik are married under special circumstances after Lovely's insistence on being with Karthik at all costs. While giving in, Mrs. Kaushik refuses to accept her as a daughter-in-law. After many obstacles and a period of living in a divided house, Lovely is finally able to impress Mrs. Kaushik and win her trust. During this process, Lovely pretends to be a maid called Dulaari serving her mother-in-law and sisters-in-law and after the charade is over, she single-handedly helps Aditya and Ria save their marriage after Ria suffers a miscarriage.

A newly united Kaushik family suffers a shock when Simran dies in the line of duty. Over time, the family overcomes the loss and Shivendu remarries. His new wife, Karantiya, had lived with the Kaushik family and underwent a change of heart before they were married.

The story revolves around the troubles and the love in the Kaushik family and how they overcome obstacles in their way.

== Cast ==
=== Main ===
- Ragini Nandwani as Lovely Karthik Kaushik (née Tyagi): Karthik's wife
  - Vindhya Tiwari replaced Ragini Nandwani as Lovely
- Mukul Harish as Karthik "Guddu" Kaushik: Bindeshwari and Satyadev's youngest son; Utkarsh, Bittu, Aditya, Shivendu and Radhe's brother; Lovely's husband
- Vibha Chibber as Bindeshwari "Maasa" Satyadev Kaushik: Satyadev's wife; Utkarsh, Bittu, Shivendu, Aditya, Karthik and Radhe's mother
- Rajeev Verma as Satyadev Kaushik: Bindeshwari's husband; Utkarsh, Bittu, Shivendu, Aditya, Karthik and Radhe's father
- Gavie Chahal as
  - ACP Shivendu "Shibhu" Kaushik: Bindeshwari and Satyadev's third son; Utkarsh, Bittu, Aditya, Karthik and Radhe's brother; Simran's widower; Karantiya's husband; Anu's father
    - Manoj Chandila replaced Chahal as Shibhu
  - Radhe Kaushik: Bindeshwari and Satyadev 's youngest son; Utkarsh, Bittu, Shivendu, Aditya and Karthik's brother; Komila's husband (deceased)
- Rubina Shergill as ACP Simran Shivendu Kaushik: Shivendu's first wife; Anu's mother (deceased)
- Divjot Sabarwal as Karantiya Shivendu Kaushik: Shivendu's second wife; Anu's stepmother
- Jignesh Joshi as Utkarsh "Munna" Kaushik: Gehna's husband; Bindeshwari and Satyadev's eldest son; Bittu, Shivendu, Aditya, Karthik and Radhe's brother: Gudiya and Bubbly's father
- Gunn Kansara as Gehna Utkarsh Kaushik: Utkarsh's wife; Gudiya and Bubbly's mother
- Mohit Mattoo as Bittu Kaushik: Nimmi's husband; Bindeshwari and Satyadev's second son; Utkarsh, Shivendu, Aditya, Karthik and Radhe's brother; Lucky's father
- Swati Bajpai as Nimmi Bittu Kaushik: Bittu's wife, Lucky's mother
- Alok Narula as Aditya "Adi" Kaushik: Ria's husband; Bindeshwari and Satyadev's fourth son; Utkarsh, Bittu, Shivendu, Karthik and Radhe's brother
- Deeya Chopra/Preet Kaur Madhan as Ria Aditya Kaushik: Aditya's wife

=== Recurring ===
- Sunita Shirole as Bhagwati "Ammasa" Devi Kaushik: Satyadev's mother; Utkarsh, Bittu, Shivendu, Aditya, Karthik and Radhe's grandmother
- Preeti Amin as Komila Radhe Kaushik (née Bhalla): Kiran and Brijbhushan's daughter; Radhe's widow
- Bharati Sharma as Aarti: Kaushik family's neighbour
- Sanjay Batra as Subodh Tyagi, a famous politician: Mala's husband; Lovely's father
- Utkarsha Naik as Mala Subodh Tyagi, a social worker: Subodh's wife; Lovely's mother
- Shiwani Chakraborty as Tanya Sharma: Lovely's friend
- Gaurav as Abhay: Lovely's friend; Tanya's husband
- Kanika Shivpuri as Daayi Maa: Tyagi family's caretaker
- Ashiesh Roy as Mr. Shukla: Lovely's former boss (2011–2012)
- Jyotsna Chandola as Anamika: Aarti's cousin; Shivendu's former fiancée (2012)
- Aashutosh Tiwari as Kundan Bansi: Anamika's boyfriend (2012)
- Guddi Maruti as Padmavati "Paddy": Bindeshwari's college friend; Madhav's wife; Honey and Baby's mother (2011–2012)
- Khushbu Thakkar as Honey: Padmavati and Madhav's elder daughter (2011–2012)
- Anurag Prapanna as Madhav "MD": Padmavati's husband; Honey and Baby's father (2011–2012)
- Menaka Lalwani as Baby: Padmavati and Madhav's younger daughter (2011–2012)
- Ruhanika Dhawan as Aashi: Pushpa and Akshay's daughter (2012)
- Rita Bhaduri as Naani: Pushpa's mother (2012)
- Navina Bole as Pushpa Dwivedi: Karthik's former girlfriend; Akshay's wife; Aashi's mother (2012)
- Sayantani Ghosh as Naina: an Icchadhaari Naagin (2012–2013)
- Gufi Paintal as Brijbhushan Bhalla: Kiran's husband; Komila's father (2012–2013)
- Gulfam Khan as Kiran Brijbhushan Bhalla: Brijbhusan's wife; Komila's mother (2012–2013)
- Rakhi Vijan as Billo Rani Bhalla: Brijbhushan's sister (2012–2013)
- Upasana Singh as Chandni: Anu's teacher

== Awards and nominations ==
Zee Gold Awards
| Year | Category | Nominee(s) | Result |
|---|---|---|---|
| 2012 | Best TV Show (Fiction) | Mrs. Kaushik Ki Paanch Bahuein | Nominated |
| 2012 | Gold Debut(Male) | Mukul Harish | Nominated |
