= Angad Hasija =

Indian television actor (born 1984)

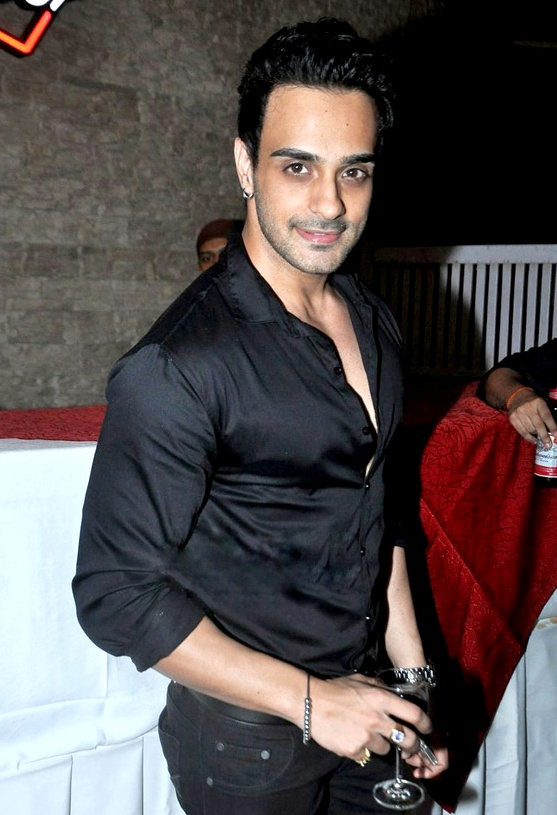
- Born: 31 May 1984 (age 41); Chandigarh, India
- Occupation: Television actor
- Years active: 2007–present
- Height: 5 ft 9 in (1.75 m)
- Spouse: Parneet Hasija (m. 2007)
- Children: Vaishnavi Hasija (daughter)
- Parent: Babli Hasija (mother)

Angad Hasija (born 31 May 1984) is an Indian television actor. He is known for his work for portraying Alekh, in Sapna Babul Ka...Bidaai in 2007 and portraying Jimmy Dhillon "JD", in Tera Rang Chadeya in 2020 on Zee Punjabi

In 2018, Angad also appeared in the Hindi music video Tere Jism with Sara Khan.

He was recently seen on the web series Ishq Aaj Kal on ZEE5.

Angad played the lead role of Jimmy Dhillon "JD" in Zee Punjabi's serial Tera Rang Chadeya. It marks the first time Angad is acting in a Punjabi show. This serial is available to watch on ZEE5.

On 24 September 2020, Angad Hasija and TV actress Sara Khan were reportedly summoned by the Indian Narcotics Control Bureau (NCB) for questioning in relation to a drug probe.

== Filmography ==
=== Television ===
Year	Serial	Role	Notes
2007	Kyunki Saas Bhi Kabhi Bahu Thi		Cameo Role
2008–2010	Sapna Babul Ka...Bidaai	Alekh Rajvansh	
2009	Yeh Rishta Kya Kehlata Hai	Alekh Rajvansh	Guest Appearance
2011	Phulwa	Shankar	
2011–2012	Preet Se Bandhi Ye Dori Ram Milaayi Jodi	Aditya Gandhi	
2013	Savitri – Ek Prem Kahani	Dev	
2013	Amrit Manthan	Angad Malik / Karan Chabara	
2015	Dilli Wali Thakur Gurls	Rajveer	
2016	SauBhagyalaxmi	Shrenik	
2016–2017	Waaris	Chandar	
2018	Laal Ishq	Akash Verma (Episode 36)	Episodic Role
2020	Tera Rang Chadeya	Jimmy "JD" Dhillon	Punjabi serial
2021–2022	Ziddi Dil Maane Na	Kundan	Negative Role
2022	Dharm Yoddha Garud	Takshak Naag	
2022	Rang Jaun Tere Rang Mein	Rudrapratap "Rudra" Srivastav	
2023–2024	Pashminna – Dhaage Mohabbat Ke	Paras Durani	Negative Role
2024	Kaise Mujhe Tum Mil Gaye	Abhiraj "Raj" Sharma	Negative Role
2025	Suman Indori	Vikram Chauhan	Negative Role
2026–present	Tumm Se Tumm Tak	Yashvardhan	

=== Reality Shows ===
Year	Show	Role
2010	Zara Nachke Dikha	Contestant
2018	Juzzbaatt – Sangeen Se Namkeen Tak	Angad Hasija
2021	Zee Punjabi Antakshari	Contestant

=== Web Series ===
Year	Show	Role	Notes
2019	Ishq Aaj Kal	Arshad Ali Khan	Lead Role
2021	CyberSquad	Shubham	Supporting Role
