= Vin Rana =

Indian television actor (born 1986)

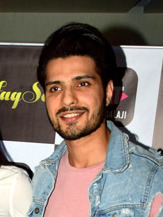
- Rana at Zee Rishtey Awards 2016
- Born: Vinay Rana; 16 December 1986 (age 39); Delhi, India
- Occupations: Model; Actor
- Years active: 2013–present
- Spouse: Nita Sofiani (m. 2016; sep. 2021)
- Children: 1

Vinay Rana, (born 16 December 1986) professionally known as Vin Rana is an Indian actor and model. He is known for his roles such as Nakula in Mahabharat and Purab Khanna in Kumkum Bhagya.

== Early life ==
Rana was born on 16 December 1976 in Delhi in a Hindu family to Krishna Rana. He has two sisters, Reema Rana and Kimmy Rana. Rana completed his schooling from local school in Delhi and graduated with a Bachelor's of Technology degree.

== Personal life ==
He embraced fatherhood with the birth of his daughter, Milana Ulianova Rana with his ex-gf Valeria Ulianova in 2015. Rana married Nita Sofiani, an Indonesian model on 22 February 2016 but they later separated in 2021 because unknown reason.

== Career ==
Rana began his television journey in September 2013 by bagging the role of Nakula, the fourth pandava Prince in the epic television series Star Plus series Mahabharat, based on the sanskrit epic of the same name until it went off air in 2014. He then acted in television series Ek Hasina Thi with the same channel as Karan Seth. Next, he played the role of Malay Mittal in Vishkanya Ek Anokhi Prem Kahani opposite Aishwarya Khare from 2015 to 2016.

Vin Rana has also played pivotal role of Purab Khanna replacing Arjit Taneja in Zee TV's Kumkum Bhagya. A year later, he appeared in the show's spin-off Kundali Bhagya playing the same role with his co-stars Sriti Jha, Shabir Ahluwalia .

In 2019, he was seen essaying the role of Kapil Salgaonkar in Kavach 2: Mahashivratri opposite Deepika Singh, also his music video 'Fitte Muh' was launched in the same year.

Later, Vin played roles of Oscar Mathews and Abeer Singh in ZEE5's Poison 2 and Jamai 2.0 respectively.

== Television ==
Year	Serial	Role	Ref.
2013–2014	Mahabharat	Nakula	
2014	Ek Hasina Thi	Karan Seth	
2016	Vishkanya...Ek Anokhi Prem Kahani	Malay Mittal	
2016–2021	Kumkum Bhagya	Purab Khanna	
2017–2018	Kundali Bhagya	Purab Khanna	
2019	Kavach... Maha Shivratri	Kapil Salgaonkar	
2022–2023	Palkon Ki Chhaon Mein 2	Anshuman Jha	

== Filmography ==
Year	Film	Role	Ref.
2023	Shehzada	Vikrant Paul	

=== Web series ===
Year	Title	Role	Ref.
2020	Poison 2	Oscar Mathews	
2020	Jamai 2.0	Abeer Singh	
2022	Hasratein 1		

=== Indonesian shows ===
He worked in Indonesia in late 2014 and 2015 and appeared in several shows, including:

- Pesbukers
- The New Eat Bulaga Indonesia
- Aladin & Alakadam

== Awards and nominations ==
Year	Award	Category	Show	Result
2018	Gold Awards	Most Fit Actor (Male)	—N/a	Nominated
