= Taj Mahotsav =

Annual festival in Shilpgram in Agra, India

- Native name: ताज महोत्सव
- English name: Taj Festival
- Date: 18 February - 27 February
- Duration: 10 days
- Location: Shilpgram, Agra
- Motive: To promote the local artisans and traditions of Agra
- Organized by: Taj Mahotsav Committee, Agra
- Website: tajmahotsav.org

Taj Mahotsav (Hindi: ताज महोत्सव, Urdu: تاج مہوتسو, translation: Taj Festival) is an annual 10-day (from 18 to 27 February) event at Shilpgram in Agra, India. This festival is inspired by the old Mughal era and nawabi style prevalent in Uttar Pradesh in the 18th and 19th centuries.

== Arts and crafts ==
About 400 artisans from different parts of India display their works of art. These include wood/stone carvings from Tamil Nadu, bamboo/cane work from North East India, paper mash work from South India and Kashmir, marble and zardozi work from Agra, wood carving from Saharanpur, brass wares from Moradabad, hand-made carpets from Bhadohi, pottery from Khurja, Chikankari work from Lucknow, silk and Zari work from Banaras, shawls and carpets from Kashmir/Gujarat, hand printing from Farrukhabad, and Kantha stitch from West Bengal. Various film production and media houses in Bollywood, like Dhaivat Records & Productions, also participate and manage artists in Mahotsav.

== History ==
The Taj Mahotsav was started in 1992 to promote the local artisans and traditions of Agra.

== Culture ==
The festival starts with a road procession which includes decorated elephants and camels to imitate the victory processions of Mughal emperors and warlords. Drum beaters, trumpet players, folk dancers, skilled craftsmen and artisans also join the procession. Artists from all over India come here to display their art and craftsmanship.

== Initiatives ==
The Uttar Pradesh State AIDS Control Society understands the importance of the event and uses different folk dances to campaign about AIDS awareness.

== Theme ==
Every year the Taj Mahotsav is celebrated with a message or theme for the world. In 2017, the theme for Taj Mahotsav was "विरासत की छाँव में" ("In the shadow of Heritage"). Through this theme, the whole heritage of the zone, which provides a backdrop to the festival, is stressed.

2022 - The theme of year 2022 was Aazadi ka Amrit Mahotsav sang, Taj key rang.

== Entry and tickets ==
- Entry Ticket mandatory (children under age 10 are free).
- All foreign visitors have fee entry.

== See also ==
- Agra
- Ram Barat
- Taj Mahal
