= Preet Se Bandhi Ye Dori Ram Milaayi Jodi =

Indian television series

- Also known as: Dev Meena
- Genre: Drama
- Written by: Rajita Sharma
- Directed by: Viveck Budakoti; Rakesh Malhotra
- Creative director: Shivani Dogra
- Starring: See below
- Opening theme: "Ram Milaayi Jodi" by Shweta Pandit & Javed Ali
- Composers: Khamosh; Anamik
- Country of origin: Indian
- Original language: Hindi
- No. of seasons: 1
- No. of episodes: 375

Production
- Producers: Rajita Sharma; Viveck Budakoti
- Camera setup: multi-camera
- Running time: approximately 24 minutes
- Production company: Magic Lantern Productions

Original release
- Network: Zee TV
- Release: 20 September 2010 – 12 April 2012

Preet Se Bandhi Ye Dori Ram Milaayi Jodi is an Indian Television drama Series that aired on Zee TV. It premiered on 20 September 2010 and ended on 12 April 2012. The series starred Priyal Gor, Sara Khan, Nishant Singh Malkani and Sujay Reu.

== Plot ==
The story is that of a Sikh Punjabi girl named Mona meeting her dream boy Anukalp, who belongs to a Gujarati family. It shows their marriage which has a chance of working only if their families stop fighting.

The story expresses contrasting emotions of pain and pleasure in the uniting of two culturally dissimilar families – each intensely defensive and uncompromising about its cultural uniqueness.

== Cast ==
- Priyal Gor/Sara Khan as Mona Gandhi: Vimmi and Satnaam's daughter; Anukalp's widow; Aditya's wife
- Nishant Singh Malkani/Sujay Reu as Anukalp Gandhi: Bharti and Kalpesh's son; Aditya and Hetal's brother; Mona's first husband
- Angad Hasija as Aditya Gandhi: Bharti and Kalpesh's son; Anukalp and Hetal's brother; Mona's second husband
- Krutika Desai Khan as Bharti Gandhi: Ketaki's sister; Kalpesh's wife; Anukalp, Aditya and Hetal's mother
- Ketki Dave as Ketaki Rane: Bharti's sister; Anukalp, Aditya and Hetal's aunt
- Sanjeev Jogtiyani as Kalpesh Gandhi: Lata's son; Bijal's brother; Bharti's husband; Anukalp, Aditya and Hetal's father
- Madhuri Sanjeev as Lata Gandhi: Kalpesh and Bijal's mother; Anukalp, Aditya and Hetal's grandma
- Nimisha Vakharia as Bijal Gandhi: Lata's daughter; Kalpesh's sister; Anukalp, Aditya and Hetal's aunt
- Riva Bubber as Vimmi Bedi: Satnaam's wife; Mona's mother
- Indraneel Bhattacharya as Satnaam Singh Bedi: Gurnaam's brother; Vimmi's husband; Mona's father
- Preet Kaur Madhan as Sweety Sodhi: Amrit and Gurnaam's daughter; Karan's sister; Mona's cousin; Parmeet's wife
- Vishal Nayak as Parmeet Sodhi: Goldie's brother; Sweety's husband
- Neeraj Malviya as Karan Bedi: Amrit and Gurnaam's son; Sweety's brother; Mona's cousin; Hetal's husband
- Meher Vij as Hetal Bedi: Bharti and Kalpesh's daughter; Anukalp and Aditya's sister; Karan's wife
- Chitrapama Banerjee as Amrit Bedi: Gurnaam's wife; Sweety and Karan's mother; Mona's aunt
- Sunil Sinha as Gurnaam Singh Bedi: Satnaam's brother; Amrit's husband; Sweety and Karan's father; Mona's uncle
- Manit Joura as Goldie Sodhi: Parmeet's brother
- Damini Joshi as Aanchal Mehat: Anukalp's one sided lover

=== Guests ===
- Himesh Reshammiya as himself
