= Kamla Nagar, Agra =

Locality in Agra, Uttar Pradesh, India

Kamla Nagar कमला नगर
- Colony/Locality
- Interactive map of Kamla Nagar
- Coordinates: 27°12′41″N 78°1′15″E
- Blocks: A, B, C, D, E, F, G
- Wards: A, B, C in Ward 81 and D, E, F in Ward 93
- PIN Code: 282005

Kamla Nagar is a locality in Agra City in Uttar Pradesh, India. It has PIN Code 282004, and is an approved colony.. Kamla Nagar is named after Kamala Nehru, a freedom fighter and wife of Jawaharlal Nehru, India's first prime minister. Kamla Nagar is a residential and commercial neighborhood in North Agra, India. It is one of Agra's major Posh Colony, good for shopping and eating.

== Mayor/MLA/MP ==
The Ex- Mayor of Agra Naveen Jain, also resides in Kamla Nagar. Kamla Nagar is basically falls under Agra North Assembly constituency, Current Mla of Kamla Nagar is Purshottam Khandelwal of BJP Party and MP is SP Singh Baghel -MOS Minister in Modi Ministry.

== Division ==
Kamla Nagar is divided into 6 blocks namely A, B, C, D, E, F and major areas like Tejnagar, Natrajpuram, Karmyogi Enclave. Blocks A, B, C comprise Agra municipal corporation ward 81, and blocks D, E, F comprise ward 93.

== Places of interest ==
Balkeshwar Mandir, Sree ram Mandir, Dauji Misthan Bhandar, Ajanta Sweets, Brijbhog Sweets

== Education ==
St. Andrews Sr Sec School, Sumeet Rahul School, Saraswati Vidhya Mandir, Ess Ess Convent are the CBSE Schools Located in area.

== Transport ==
Metro Rail project will also come to Kamla Nagar in a few days and Auto, Buses also connect with Major Railway Stations like Agra Cantt, Agra Fort, Raja Ki mandi. Waterworks is the main landmark for the Buses came from Delhi and Kanpur, Lucknow area.

== Gas Source ==
Kamla Nagar is one of the localities in Agra with PNG, or piped natural gas availability, which is provided by Green Gas Limited.
