= Preet Kaur Nayak =

Indian television actress (born 1983)

- Born: 3 September 1983 (age 42)
- Other names: Preet Kaur Madhan, Preet Kaur
- Occupation: Actress
- Years active: 2009–present
- Spouse: Vishal Nayak (m. 2011)
- Children: 1

Preet Kaur Nayak (born 3 September 1983) is an Indian television actress. She worked in serials like Sabki Laadli Bebo, Ram Milaayi Jodi, Fear Files: Darr Ki Sacchi Tasvirein, Savdhaan India and Chakravartin Ashoka Samrat as Queen Subrasi. Preet also worked in a film Yeh Jo Mohabbat Hai in 2012.

== Filmography ==
=== Television ===
- Sabki Laadli Bebo as Geet Malhotra
- Ram Milaayi Jodi as Sweety
- Tum Dena Saath Mera as Riya Oberoi
- Mrs. Kaushik Ki Paanch Bahuein as Ria Kaushik
- Fear Files: Darr Ki Sacchi Tasvirein
- Savdhaan India as Sujata
- Chakravartin Ashoka Samrat as Queen Subrasi
- Dil Deke Dekho as Simran Chopra
- Mayavi Maling as Queen Dharini
- Vikram Betaal Ki Rahasya Gatha as Renuka
- Muskaan as Tara
- Jag Janani Maa Vaishno Devi - Kahani Mata Rani Ki as Kadika
- Imlie as Rupali Tripathi
- Kumkum Bhagya as Deepika Vikrant Malhotra
- Binddii as Advocate Damini Thakur

=== Films ===
- Yeh Jo Mohabbat Hai (2012)
- Apni Boli Apna Des
