= List of Hindi television actors =

This is a list of notable Hindi television actors.

Pioneers of Hindi television

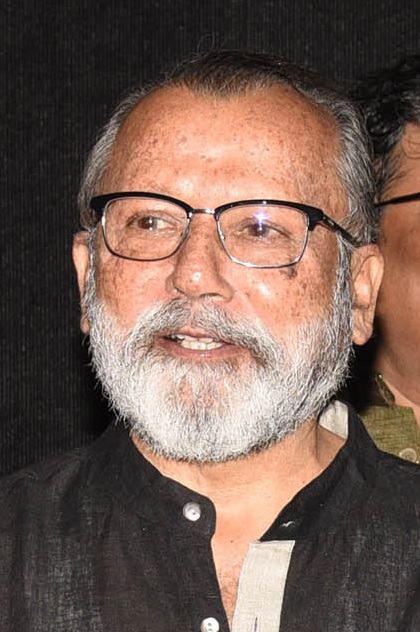
Pankaj Kapur

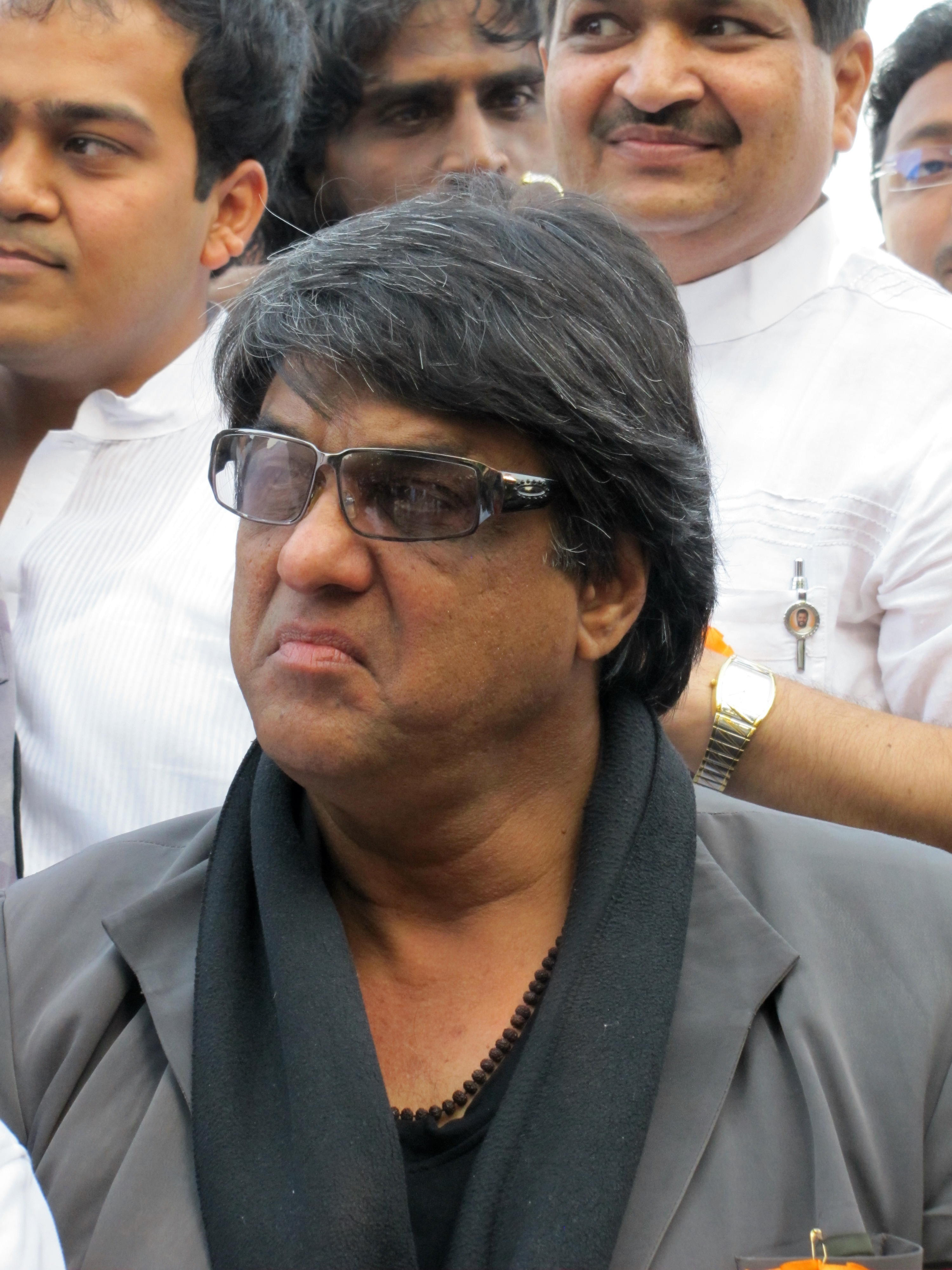
Mukesh Khanna

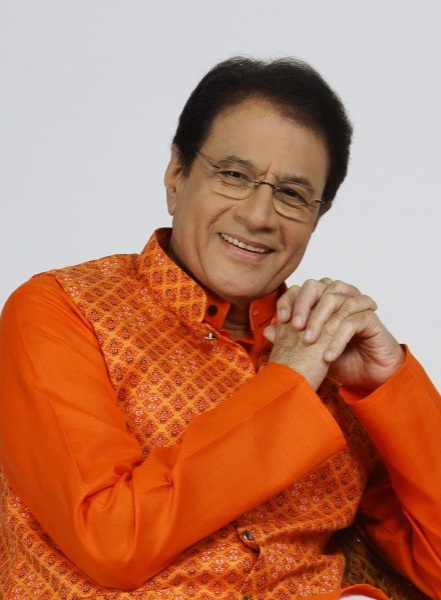
Arun Govil

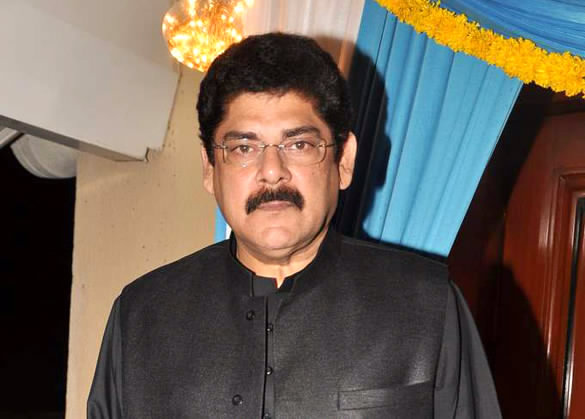
Pankaj Dheer

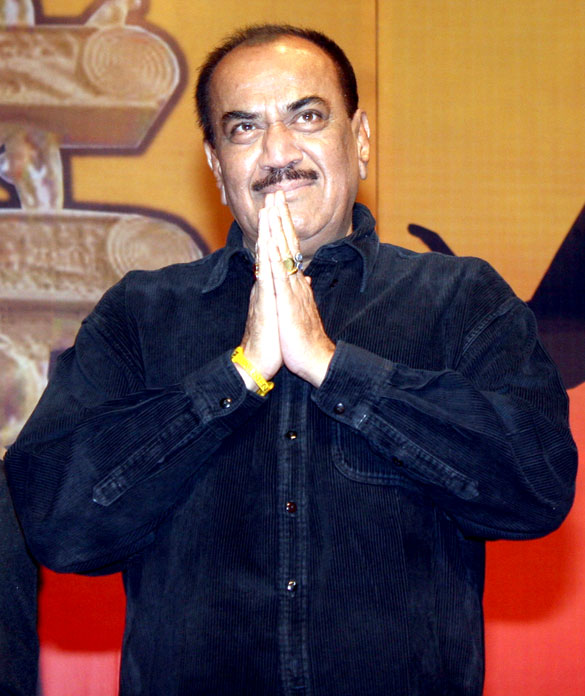
Shivaji Satam

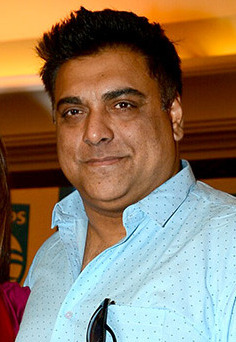
Ram Kapoor

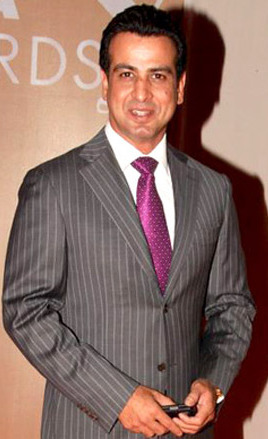
Ronit Roy

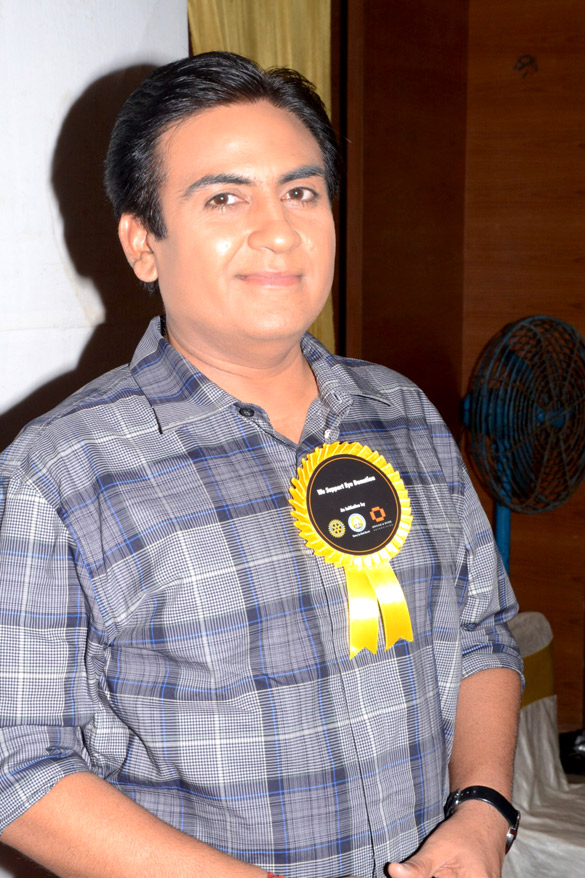
Dilip Joshi

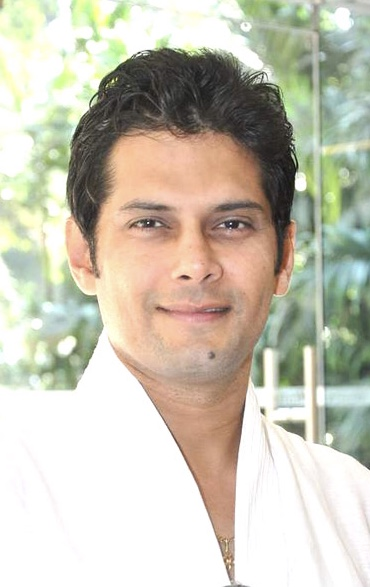
Amar Upadhyay

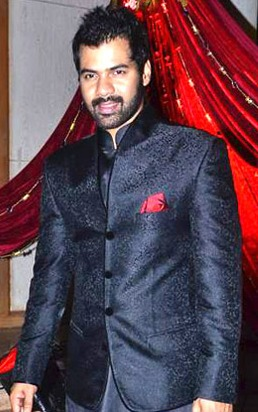
Shabir Ahluwalia

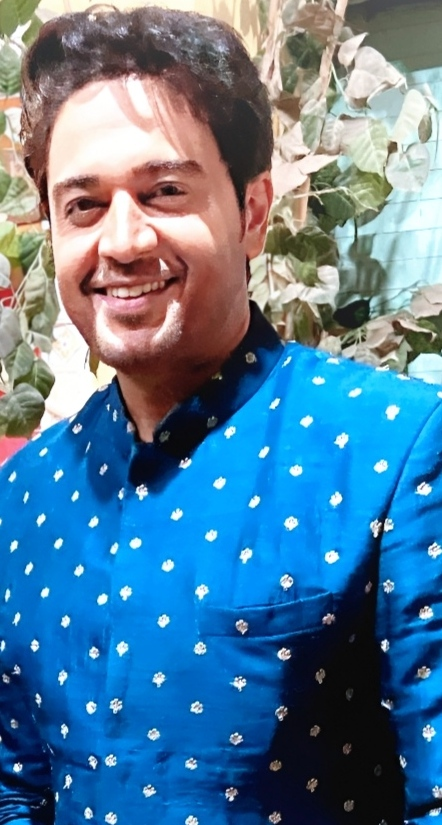
Gaurav Khanna

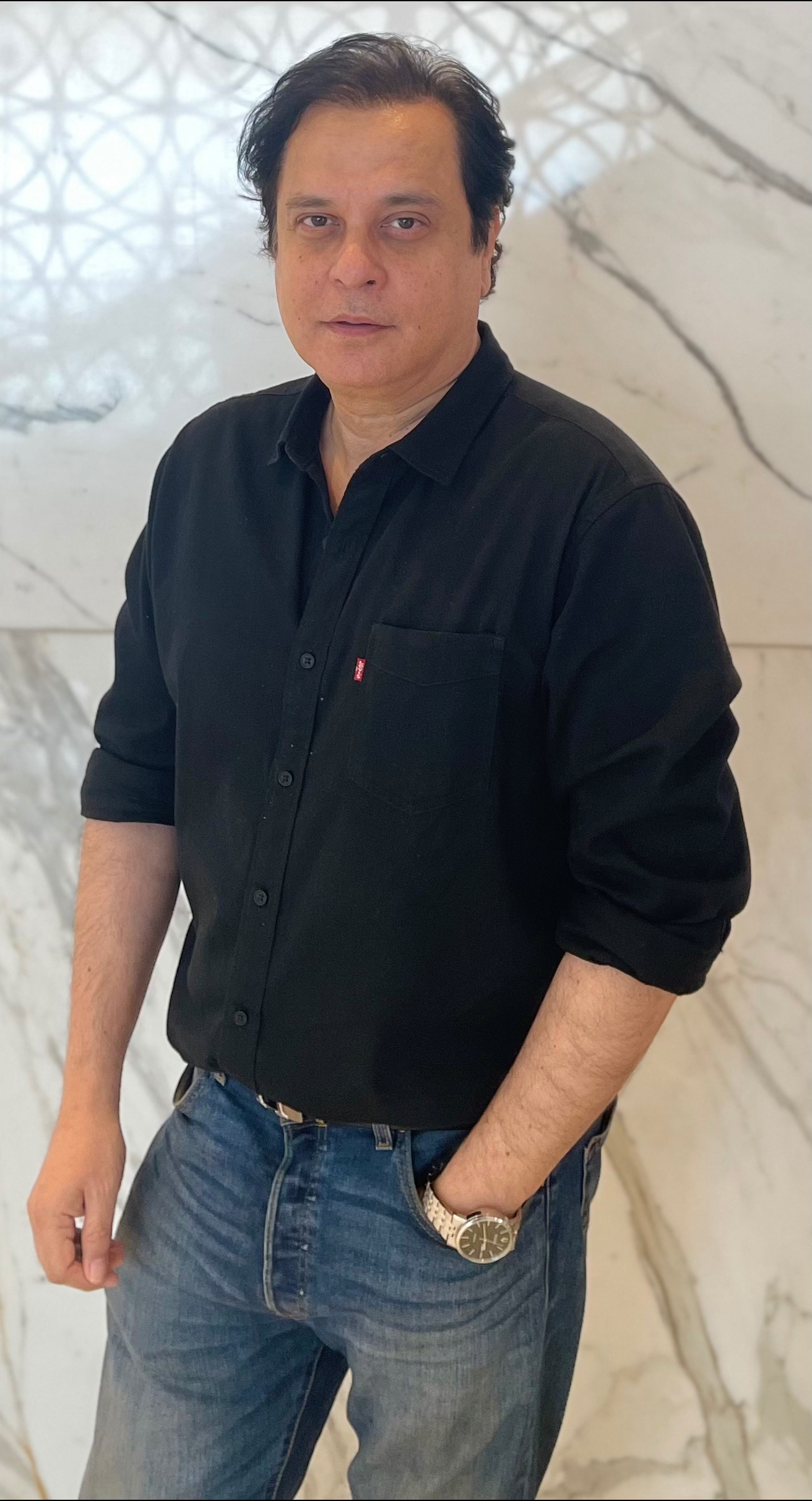
Mahesh Thakur

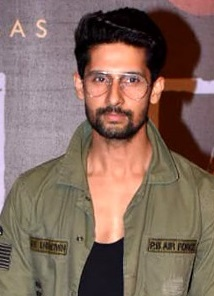
Ravi Dubey

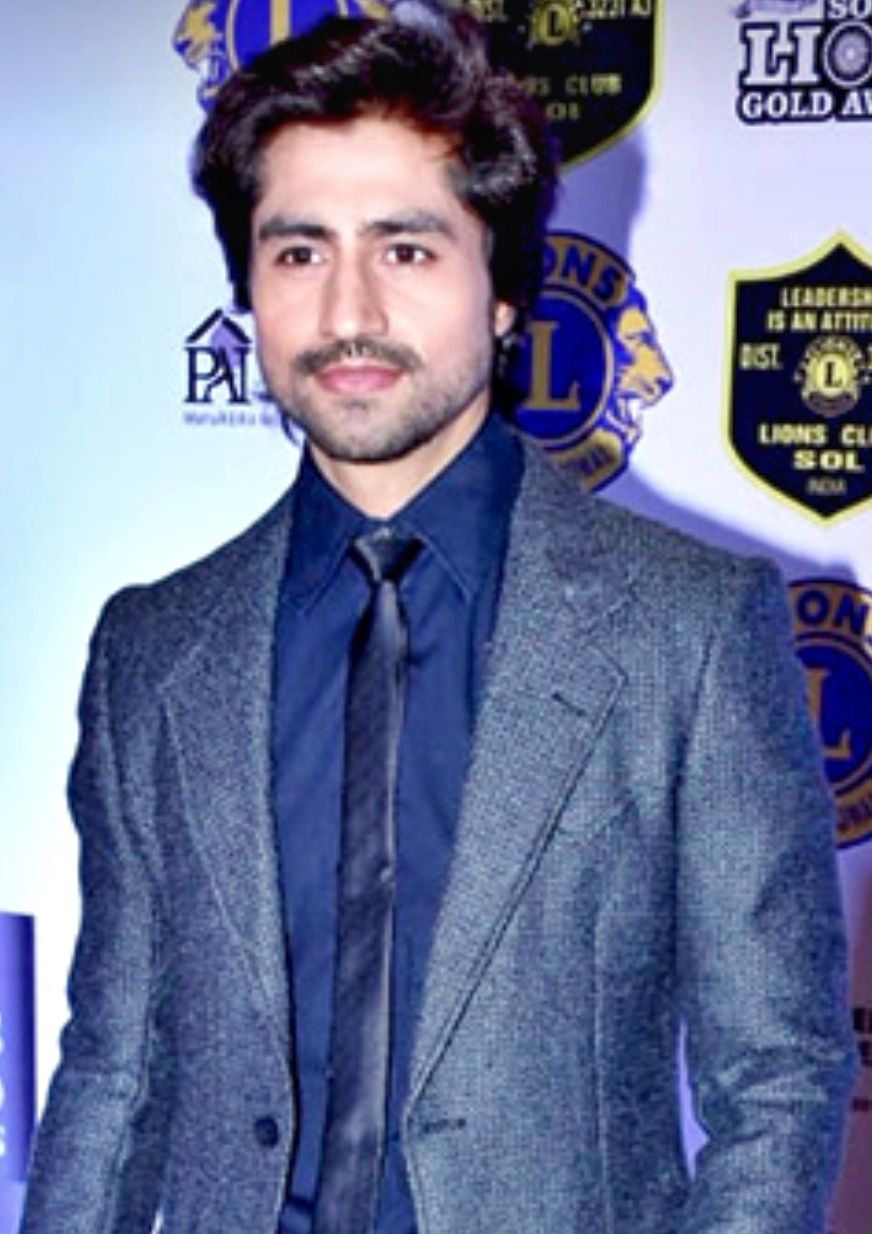
Harshad Chopda

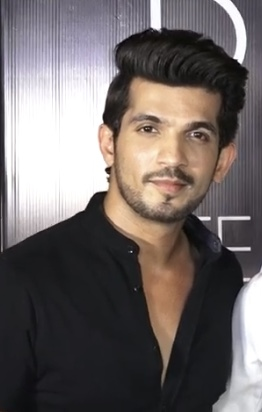
Arjun Bijlani

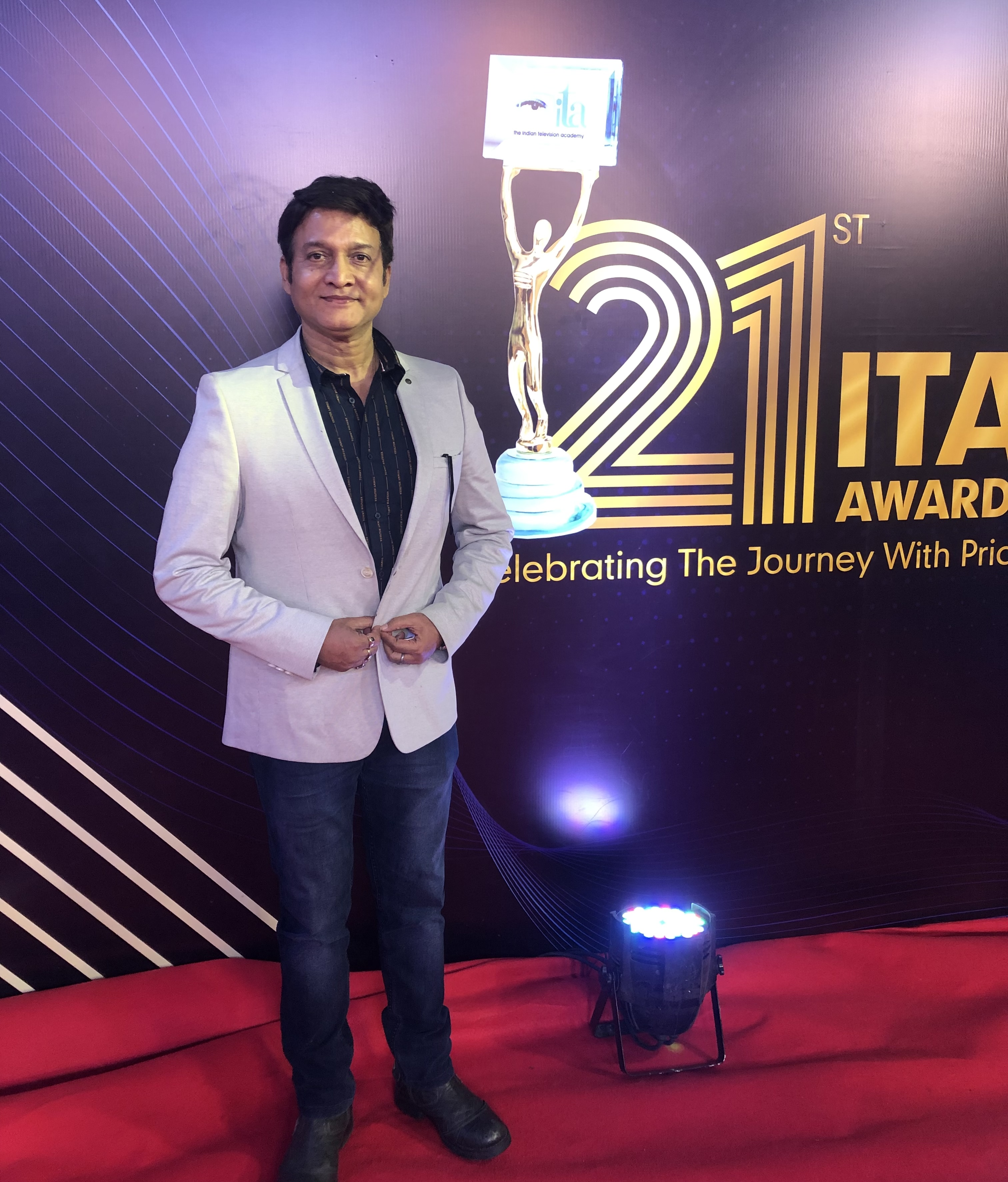
Hemant Choudhary

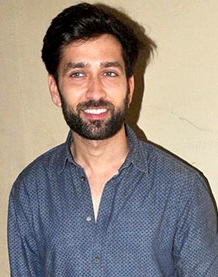
Nakuul Mehta

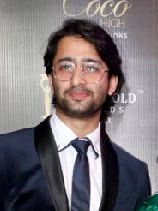
Shaheer Sheikh

== Television actors ==
Name	Years active	Known for
Aamir Ali	2002–present	F.I.R.
Aamir Dalvi	2011–present	Sanskaar Laxmi; Supercops vs Supervillains; Aladdin - Naam Toh Suna Hoga
Abhishek Nigam	2017–present	Akbar – Rakht Se Takht Ka Safar; Hero – Gayab Mode On; Pukaar – Dil Se Dil Tak
Aasif Sheikh	1984–present	Yes Boss (TV series); Bhabiji Ghar Par Hain!
Abhishek Chatterjee	1986–2022	
Abir Chatterjee	2004–present	
Abhinav Shukla	2004–present	Bigg Boss 14; Fear Factor: Khatron Ke Khiladi 11
Abrar Qazi	2018–present	Gathbandhan; Yeh Hai Chahatein
Aditya Srivastava	1998–present	CID
Adnan Khan	2014–present	Ishq Subhan Allah
Aham Sharma	2008–present	Mahabharat (2013); Brahmarakshas
Ali Asgar	1987–present	Kahaani Ghar Ghar Kii; Comedy Nights with Kapil; The Kapil Sharma Show
Alok Nath	1980–present	Yeh Rishta Kya Kehlata Hai; Buniyaad; Sapna Babul Ka...Bidaai; Astitva...Ek Prem Kahani
Aly Goni	2012–present	Yeh Hai Mohabbatein; Kuch Toh Hai Tere Mere Darmiyaan; Fear Factor: Khatron Ke Khiladi 9; Bigg Boss 14
Aman Verma	1989–present	Kehta Hai Dil
Amar Upadhyay	1985–present	Kyunki Saas Bhi Kabhi Bahu Thi; Molkki
Amit Varma	2002–present	Saas Bina Sasural
Anas Rashid	2006–present	Diya Aur Baati Hum
Anang Desai	1988–present	Teen Bahuraaniyaan; KhichdiI
Aniruddh Dave	2008–present	Patiala Babes
Ankit Mohan	2006–present	Naagin 3; Mahabharat; Haiwaan : The Monster; Kaatelal & Sons; Jag Janani Maa Vaishno Devi - Kahani Mata Rani Ki
Ankit Gupta	2010–present	Udaariyaan
Anup Soni	1995–present	Crime Patrol
Apurva Agnihotri	2003–present	Jassi Jaissi Koi Nahin; Anupamaa
Arhaan Behll	2009–present	Mann Kee Awaaz Pratigya; Yehh Jadu Hai Jinn Ka!
Arjit Taneja	2012–present	Kumkum Bhagya; Kaleerein; Bahu Begum; Naagin 5; Naagin 6
Arjun (Firoz Khan)	1988–present	Mahabharat
Arjun Bijlani	2004–present	Left Right Left; Miley Jab Hum Tum; Naagin; Ishq Mein Marjawan; Fear Factor: Khatron Ke Khiladi 11
Arun Govil	1987–present	Ramayan (1987)
Arpit Ranka	2013–present	Mahabharat (2013)
Ashish Sharma	2009–present	Rangrasiya; Siya Ke Ram
Akshit Sukhija	2019–present	Shubharambh
Avinash Mishra	2017-present	Yeh Teri Galiyan; Bigg Boss 18
Avinash Sachdev	2005–present	Chotti Bahu; Iss Pyaar Ko Kya Naam Doon? Ek Baar Phir
Bhavya Gandhi	2008–present	Taarak Mehta Ka Ooltah Chashmah
Barun Sobti	2009–present	Iss Pyaar Ko Kya Naam Doon?
Cezanne Khan	1997–present	Kasautii Zindagii Kay; Shakti - Astitva Ke Ehsaas Ki
Dakssh Ajit Singh	2007–present	Maryada: Lekin Kab Tak?; Ishq Ka Rang Safed; Laado 2
Dayanand Shetty	1997–present	CID
Dev Joshi	2012–present	Baal Veer; Baalveer Returns
Deven Bhojani	1987–present	Baa Bahoo Aur Baby
Dheeraj Dhoopar	2009–present	Kundali Bhagya; Sasural Simar Ka; Naagin 5
Dilip Joshi	1989–present	Taarak Mehta Ka Ooltah Chashmah
Dino Morea	1996—present	Captain Vyom; Remix
Fahmaan Khan	2014–present	Apna Time Bhi Aayega; Imlie
Gaurav Chopra	2004–present	
Gaurav Khanna	2005–present	CID (Indian TV series); Prem Ya Paheli – Chandrakanta; Yeh Pyar Na Hoga Kam; Anupamaa; Jeevan Saathi; Celebrity MasterChef India; Bigg Boss 19
Gautam Gulati	2008–present	Bigg Boss 8
Gautam Rode	2000–present	Baa Bahu Aur Baby; Lucky; Saraswatichandra; Maha Kumbh: Ek Rahasaya, Ek Kahani; Suryaputra Karn; Kaal Bhairav Rahasya 2
Gurmeet Chaudhary	2006–present	Geet; Punar Vivaah; Ramayan (2008)
Harsh Chhaya	1993–present	Astitva...Ek Prem Kahani; Justujoo
Harsh Rajput	2006–present	Nazar
Harshad Arora	2013–present	Beintehaa
Harshad Chopda	2006–present	Left Right Left; Kis Desh Mein Hai Meraa Dil; Tere Liye; Dil Se Di Dua...Saubhagyavati Bhava?; Bepannah; Yeh Rishta Kya Kehlata Hai; Bade Achhe Lagte Hain 4
Himanshu Rai	2016–present	Mere Sai - Shraddha Aur Saburi
Hemant Choudhary	2001-present	Kumkum; Jhansi Ki Rani; Veer Shivaji; Thapki Pyaar Ki; Siya Ke Ram; Main Maike Chali Jaungi Tum Dekhte Rahiyo
Hiten Tejwani	2000–present	Kutumb; Kyunki Saas Bhi Kabhi Bahu Thi
Hussain Kuwajerwala	1996–present	Kumkum – Ek Pyara Sa Bandhan
Indraneil Sengupta	1999–present	Pyaar Ke Do Naam: Ek Raadha, Ek Shyaam
Iqbal Khan (actor)	2005–present	Kaisa Ye Pyar Hai; Kahiin To Hoga; Kkavyanjali; Karam Apnaa Apnaa; Chhoona Hai Aasmaan; Waaris; Sanjog Se Bani Sangini; Yahan Main Ghar Ghar Kheli; Teri Meri Love Stories; Tumhari Paakhi; Fear Factor: Khatron Ke Khiladi 6; Pyaar Ko Ho Jaane Do; Bharatvarsh; Ek Tha Raja Ek Thi Rani; Bahu Hamari Rajni Kant; Kaal Bhairav Rahasya; Dil Se Dil Tak; Nima Denzongpa; Na Umra Ki Seema Ho
Ishaan Dhawan	2019–present	Zindagi Mere Ghar Aana; Gud Se Meetha Ishq; Dhruv Tara – Samay Sadi Se Pare
Jatin Kanakia	1994–1999	Shrimaan Shrimati
Jay Bhanushali	2006–present	Kayamath; Dance India Dance
Jay Soni	2003–present	Sasural Genda Phool; Yeh Rishta Kya Kehlata Hai
Jimit Trivedi	2000–present	Sarabhai vs Sarabhai; Jeevan Saathi — Humsafar Zindagi Ke; Hum Dono Hain Alag Alag; Ek Doosre Se Karte Hain Pyaar Hum; Chhanchhan; Madhubala
Kanan Malhotra	2008-present	Rab Se Sohna Isshq; Suryaputra Karn; Mahakali - Anth Hi Aarambh Hai; Radha Krishna
Kanwar Dhillon	2012–present	Na Bole Tum Na Maine Kuch Kaha; Do Dil Ek Jaan; Pandya Store
Karan Grover	2004–present	Bahu Hamari Rajni Kant; Yahan Main Ghar Ghar Kheli; Kahaan Hum Kahaan Tum
Karan Jotwani	2013–present	Aap Ke Aa Jane Se
Karan Kundra	2009–present	Dil Hi Toh Hai; Yeh Kahan Aa Gaye Hum; Bigg Boss 15
Karan Mehra	2009–present	Yeh Rishta Kya Kehlata Hai
Karan Patel	2000–present	Kasamh Se; Yeh Hai Mohabbatein; Kasautii Zindagii Kay
Karan Singh Grover	2004–present	Dill Mill Gayye; Qubool Hai; Kasautii Zindagii Kay
Karan Sharma	2009–present	Ek Nayi Pehchan; Baa Bahoo Aur Baby; Mohi; Bandini; Pyaar Ka Bandhan; Kaala Teeka; Sapnon Se Bhare Naina; Brahmarakshas
Karan Tacker	2008–present	Ek Hazaaron Mein Meri Behna Hai
Karan Wahi	2004–present	Remix; Dill Mill Gayye
Karanvir Bohra	1999–present	Shararat; Kasautii Zindagii Kay; Dil Se Di Dua... Saubhagyavati Bhava?; Qubool Hai; Naagin 2
Karmveer Choudhary	2012–present	Badho Bahu; Kuch Rang Pyar Ke Aise Bhi; Kya Qusoor Hai Amala Ka?; Patiala Babes
Karanvir Sharma	2012–present	Shaurya Aur Anokhi Ki Kahani
Kiku Sharda	2003–present	The Kapil Sharma Show
Kinshuk Mahajan	2007–present	Pandya Store Sapna Babul Ka… Bidaai
Kiran Karmarkar	2000–present	Kahaani Ghar Ghar Kii
Krushna Abhishek	2002– present	Comedy Circus; Comedy Classes; Comedy Nights Bachao; The Kapil Sharma Show; The Drama Company; Laughter Chefs – Unlimited Entertainment
Kunal Jaisingh	2011–present	Ishqbaaaz; Dil Boley Oberoi; Silsila Badalte Rishton Ka 2
Kunal Karan Kapoor	2004–present	Na Bole Tum Na Maine Kuch Kaha
Kunwar Amar	2010–present	Dil Dostii Dance
Kushal Tandon	2005–present	Ek Hazaaron Mein Meri Behna Hai; Beyhadh; Bigg Boss 7; Hum - I'm Because of Us; Bebaakee; Barsatein – Mausam Pyaar Ka
Laksh Lalwani	2014–present	Porus
Lavanya Bhardwaj	2012–present	Mahabharat (2013 TV series)
Leenesh Mattoo	2014–present	Ishqbaaaz
Mahesh Thakur	1994–present	Tu Tu Main Main; Swabhimaan; Sailaab; Hudd Kar Di; Astitva...Ek Prem Kahani; Shararat; Malini Iyer; Ye Meri Life Hai; Sapna Babul Ka...Bidaai; Bhabhi; Sasural Genda Phool; Tera Mujhse Hai Pehle Ka Naata Koi; Luck Luck Ki Baat; Ramleela – Ajay Devgn Ke Saath; Ghar Aaja Pardesi; Kabhi Aise Geet Gaya Karo; Woh Teri Bhabhi Hai Pagle; Ishqbaaaz; Dil Boley Oberoi; Udaan
Manav Gohil	2000–present	Yam Hain Hum; Tenali Rama
Manish Goplani	2014–present	Thapki Pyar Ki
Manit Joura	2009-present	12/24 Karol Bagh; Preet Se Bandhi Ye Dori Ram Milaayi Jodi; Adaalat; Kundali Bhagya; Prem Bandhan; Naagin 6
Mamik Singh	1993–present	Ssshhhh...Koi Hai; Vikraal Aur Gabraal
Mishal Raheja	2005–present	
Mohammed Iqbal Khan	2002–present	Sanjog Se Bani Sangini
Mohammad Nazim	2010–present	Saath Nibhaana Saathiya
Mohit Kumar	2020- present	Ek Duje Ke Vaaste 2; Sab Satrang; Vanshaj
Mohit Malik	2005–present	Doli Armaano Ki; Kullfi Kumarr Bajewala
Mohit Raina	2004–present	Devon Ke Dev...Mahadev
Mohit Sehgal	2008–present	Miley Jab Hum Tum; Sarojini; Naagin 5
Mohnish Bahl	2002–present	Sanjivani (2002); Dill Mill Gayye
Mohsin Khan	2014–present	Nisha Aur Uske Cousins; Yeh Rishta Kya Kehlata Hai
Mukesh Khanna	1988–present	Mahabharat (1988); Shaktimaan
Nakuul Mehta	2008–present	Ishqbaaaz; Pyaar Ka Dard Hai Meetha Meetha Pyaara Pyaara; Bade Achhe Lagte Hain 2; Bade Achhe Lagte Hain 3
Namik Paul	2015–present	Ek Duje Ke Vaaste; Ek Deewaana Tha; Kumkum Bhagya
Namit Khanna	2013–present	Yeh Pyaar Nahi Toh Kya Hai; Sanjivani (2019)
Namish Taneja	2015–present	Swaragini
Naved Aslam	1990–present	Pyaar Kii Ye Ek Kahaani; Jodha Akbar; Beintehaa; Suryaputra Karn
Neil Bhatt	2008–present	Ghum Hai Kisikey Pyaar Meiin
Nishant Singh Malkani	2009–present	Ram Milaye Jodi; Guddan Tumse Na Ho Payega
Nitish Bharadwaj	1988–present	Mahabharat (1988); Vishnu Puran
Pearl V Puri	2013–present	Naagin 3; Bepanah Pyaar
Pankaj Berry	1990–present	Tenali Rama; Dil Diyaan Gallaan
Pankaj Dheer	1988–present	Mahabharat (1988)
Param Singh	2013–present	Sadda Haq; Ghulaam; Ishk Par Zor Nahi
Paras Arora	2005–present	Veer Shivaji; Mahabharat (2013); Police Factory; Kaatelal & Sons; Dil Diyaan Gallan
Paras Chhabra	2012–present	MTV Splitsvilla'; Bigg Boss
Paras Kalnawat	2017–present	Meri Durga; Ishq Aaj Kal; Anupamaa
Paresh Ganatra	1984–present	
Parth Samthaan	2012–present	Kaisi Yeh Yaariaan; Kasautii Zindagii Kay
Praneet Bhat	2004–present	Mahabharat (2013); Porus; Aladdin - Naam Toh Suna Hoga
Pravisht Mishra	2011–present	Barrister Babu; Banni Chow Home Delivery
Puneet Issar	1987–present	Mahabharat (1988)
Rrahul Sudhir	2016–present	Rajaa Betaa; Ishq Mein Marjawan 2
Rahil Azam	2001–present	Hatim; CID; Tu Aashiqui; Maddam Sir
Rahul Vaidya	2005–present	Indian Idol; Bigg Boss; Fear Factor: Khatron Ke Khiladi 11
Rajat Tokas	1999–present	Dharti Ka Veer Yodha Prithviraj Chauhan; Jodha Akbar
Rajeev Khandelwal	1998–present	Kahiin to Hoga; Left Right Left; Reporters
Rajeev Mehta	1992–present	Khichdi
Rajesh Kumar	2000–present	Sarabhai vs Sarabhai
Ram Kapoor	1997–present	Kasamh Se; Bade Achhe Lagte Hain
Randeep Rai	2014–present	Yeh Un Dinon Ki Baat Hai
Ravi Dubey	2006–present	Jamai Raja
Ravi Krishna	2004–present	Mogali Rekulu; Manasu Mamata; Aame Katha
Raqesh Vashisth	2005–present	
Rithvik Dhanjani	2009–present	Pyaar Kii Ye Ek Kahaani; Pavitra Rishta; Yeh Hai Aashiqui
Ritvik Arora	2017–present	Tu Aashiqui; Yeh Rishtey Hain Pyaar Ke
Rohan Mehra	2015–present	Yeh Rishta Kya Kehlata Hai
Rohit Bhardwaj	2008–present	Mahabharat (2013 TV series); Navya..Naye Dhadkan Naye Sawaal
Rohit Roy	1994–present	Swabhimaan
Rohit Suchanti	2017–present	Saath Nibhana Saathiya; Rishta Likhenge Hum Naya
Rohitash Gaud	1997–present	Lapataganj; Bhabiji Ghar Par Hain!
Ronit Roy	1992–present	Kasautii Zindagii Kay (2001); Kyunki Saas Bhi Kabhi Bahu Thi; Bandini; Adaalat; Itna Karo Na Mujhe Pyaar
Sachin Shroff	2002–present	
Sachin Tyagi	2003–present	Tere Sheher Mein; Swaragini – Jodein Rishton Ke Sur; Yeh Rishta Kya Kehlata Hai
Sanjeev Tyagi	2000–present	Crime Patrol; Court Room - Sachchai Hazir Ho; Junoon - Aisi Nafrat Toh Kaisa Ishq
Sarvadaman D. Banerjee	1993–present	Krishna
Saurabh Pandey	2007-present	Jiya Jale; Shaurya Aur Suhani; Razia Sultan; Suryaputra Karn
Saurabh Raj Jain	2004–present	Devon Ke Dev...Mahadev; Mahabharat (2013); Mahakali; Chandragupta Maurya; Patiala Babes
Saurav Gurjar	2013–present	Mahabharat (2013); Sankat Mochan Mahabali Hanumaan
Sehban Azim	2008–present	Tujhse Hai Raabta; Bepannah
Siddhant Karnick	2004–present	*Ek Tha Raja Ek Thi Rani: Pyaar Kii Ye Ek Kahaani; Remix
Shabir Ahluwalia	1999–present	Kumkum Bhagya; Kahiin to Hoga; Kayamath; Kasautii Zindagii Kay; Fear Factor: Khatron Ke Khiladi 3; Guinness World Records – Ab India Todega; Laagi Tujhse Lagan; Pyar Ka Pehla Naam: Radha Mohan; Fixerr
Shah Rukh Khan	1988–present	Fauji; Circus
Shaheer Sheikh	2009–present	Mahabharat (2013); Kuch Rang Pyar Ke Aise Bhi; Navya..Naye Dhadkan Naye Sawaal; Dastaan-E-Mohabbat Salim Anarkali; Yeh Rishtey Hain Pyaar Ke; Woh Toh Hai Albelaa
Shakti Arora	2006–present	Meri Aashiqui Tum Se Hi; Silsila Badalte Rishton Ka
Shalin Bhanot	2005-present	Nach Baliye; Do Hanso Ka Joda; Suryaputra Karn; Bigg Boss 16; Bekaboo
Shantanu Maheshwari	2011–present	Dil Dostii Dance
Sharad Kelkar	2004–present	Saat Phere - Saloni Ka Safar
Sharad Malhotra	2004–present	Kasam Tere Pyaar Ki; Bharat Ka Veer Putra – Maharana Pratap; Banoo Main Teri Dulhann; Naagin 5; Vidrohi
Shashank Vyas	2009–present	Balika Vadhu; Jaana Na Dil Se Door; Roop - Mard Ka Naya Swaroop
Shivaji Satam	1998–present	CID
Siddharth Nigam	2011–present	Chakravartin Ashoka Samrat; Aladdin - Naam Toh Suna Hoga
Sidharth Shukla	2004–2021	Balika Vadhu; Fear Factor: Khatron Ke Khiladi; Dil Se Dil Tak; Bigg Boss
Sparsh Shrivastava	2010–present	Shake It Up; Balika Vadhu; Jamtara; Laapataa Ladies
Sudhanshu Pandey	1999–Present	Anupamaa
Sujay Reu	2011–Present	‘’Shrimad Ramayan’’
Sumedh Mudgalkar	2013–present	Radha Krishn; Dil Dostii Dance
Sumeet Raghavan	1983–present	Sarabhai vs Sarabhai; Badi Doooor Se Aaye Hai; Sajan Re Jhoot Mat Bolo
Sunil Lahri	1987–present	Ramayan
Surendra Pal	1984–present	Mahabharat (1988); Chanakya; Shaktimaan
Sushant Singh Rajput	2008–2020	Kis Desh Mein Hai Meraa Dil; Pavitra Rishta
Swwapnil Joshi	1993–present	Shri Krishna; Luv Kush
Tathagata Mukherjee	2007–present	
Varun Badola	1994–present	Astitva...Ek Prem Kahani; Des Mein Niklla Hoga Chand; Mere Dad Ki Dulhan
Varun Kapoor	2008–present	Saraswatichandra; Swaragini - Jodein Rishton Ke Sur; Na Aana Is Des Laado; Humse Hai Liife; Savitri Devi College & Hospital; Gangubai Kathiawadi
Varun Sood	2015–present	MTV Roadies season 12; MTV Splitsvilla season 9; Ace of Space 1; Fear Factor: Khatron Ke Khiladi 11; Karmma Calling
Vatsal Sheth	1996–present	Ek Hasina Thi
Vikram Singh Chauhan	2013–present	Jaana Na Dil Se Door; Ek Deewaana Tha; Qubool Hai; Baarish (web series); Yehh Jadu Hai Jinn Ka!
Vijayendra Kumeria	2011–present	Udaan; Naagin 4; Aapki Nazron Ne Samjha
Vin Rana	2013–present	Mahabharat; Kumkum Bhagya
Vipul Roy	2002–present	F.I.R.; Sahib Biwi Aur Boss
Vishal Aditya Singh	2009–present	Kullfi Kumarr Bajewala; Nach Baliye; Bigg Boss
Vivian Dsena	2010–present	Madhubala – Ek Ishq Ek Junoon; Pyaar Kii Ye Ek Kahaani; Shakti - Astitva Ke Ehsaas Ki; Fear Factor: Khatron Ke Khiladi 7; Jhalak Dikhhla Jaa Season 8; Sirf Tum; Udaariyaan; Bigg Boss 18
Zain Imam	2014–present	Kaisi Yeh Yaariaan; Naamkarann; Tashan-E-Ishq; Ek Bhram...Sarvagun Sampanna

== See also ==
- List of Hindi television actresses
- List of Indian television actors
- List of Hindi film actors
