= Vikkas Manaktala =

Indian television actor (born 1984)

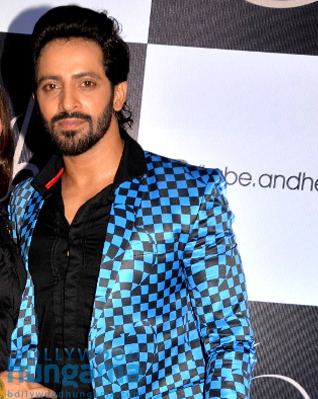
- Manaktala in 2017
- Occupations: Actor, model
- Years active: 2006–present
- Spouse: Gunjan Walia (m. 2015)

Vikkas Manaktala is an Indian television actor known for portraying Cadet Amar Huda in Left Right Left and Gangadhar Rao in Jhansi Ki Rani. In 2022, he participated in Bigg Boss 16 as a wild card contestant.

== Career ==
Manaktala started as a ramp model. Later, he joined television in 2006 portraying Cadet Amardeep "Amar" Huda in Sony SAB's Left Right Left until 2008.

After a five-year break, he made his comeback in 2013 playing Sameer Verma/Aditya Jagannadh in Main Naa Bhoolungi on Sony Entertainment Television, opposite Aishwarya Sakhuja. In 2016, he acted as Neel Sharma in Yeh Hai Aashiqui.

The next year, Manaktala appeared as Veer Pratap in Life OK's Ghulaam alongside Param Singh and Niti Taylor. Then he portrayed Gangadhar Rao in Color's historical drama Jhansi Ki Rani opposite Anushka Sen and Balveer in &TV's Laal Ishq opposite wife Gunjan Walia. Next, he joined the cast of Star Plus's Namah as Shiva.

In 2022, Manaktala entered the Colors TV's reality TV show Bigg Boss 16 as a wild card contestant. He was evicted on day 90, finishing at 13th place.

== Television ==
Year	Title	Role	Note(s)	Ref.
2006–2008	Left Right Left	Cadet Amardeep "Amar" Huda		
2013–2014	Main Naa Bhoolungi	Sameer Verma / Aditya Jagannath		
2016	Yeh Hai Aashiqui	Neel Sharma	Season 4	
2017	Ghulaam	Veer Pratap		
2019	Jhansi Ki Rani	Gangadhar Rao		
2019	Laal Ishq	Balveer		
2019	Namah	Shiva		
2022	Bigg Boss 16	Contestant	13th place	
2025	Special Ops 2.0	Abhay Singh		

== Awards ==
Year	Award	Category	Role	Show	Result
2011	Indian Telly Award	Fresh New Face - Male	Amardeep Huda	Left Right Left	Nominated
