= Ruchi Savarn =

Indian television actress

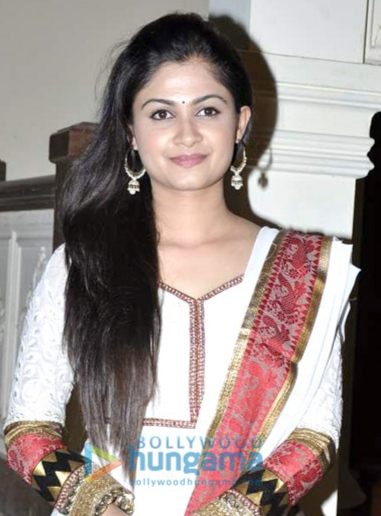
- Savarn in 2013
- Occupation: Actress
- Years active: 2009–present
- Spouse: Ankit Mohan (m. 2015)
- Children: 1

Ruchi Savarn is an Indian television actress. She is known for her performances in Ghar Aaja Pardesi, Kumkum Bhagya and Kundali Bhagya.

== Personal life ==
Savarn married actor Ankit Mohan on 2 December 2015. They had their first child, a boy on 7 December 2021.

== Career ==
Savarn began in television as an assistant director/producer before becoming an actor.

Her roles include Hindi ones in productions such as Zunj Marathmoli, Ghar Aaja Pardesi, Crime Patrol, Fear Files, Mejwani Pariporna Kitchen, Tere Liye as Janaki and in Pyaar Ka Bandhan with the role of Radha. In the Marathi TV serial, Sakhi, she acted the role of Revati while playing against the lead actor Digpal Lanjekar. She is also a trained dancer.

== Filmography ==
=== Television ===
Year	Serial	Role	Ref.
2009–2010	Pyaar Ka Bandhan	Radha	
2010–2011	Tere Liye	Jonaki Ganguly	
2011	Mann Kee Awaaz Pratigya	Sunehri	
2012	Fear Files	Prerna	
2012	Crime Patrol		
2013	Jhunj Marathmoli	Contestant	
2013	Ghar Aaja Pardesi	Devika Mishra	
2014–2015	Ajeeb Daastaan Hai Ye	Garima	
2014–2015	Sakhi	Revati	
2016	Tamanna	Mridula	
2017	Sakhya Re	Priyamvada	
2017–2019	Kumkum Bhagya	Disha Singh	
2017–2018	Kundali Bhagya	Disha Singh	
2026	Sairaab	Rusha Rudraneel Basu	
2026	Seher – Hone Ko Hai	Rukshar Niyazi	

=== Films ===
Year	Title	Role	Ref.
2019	Fatteshikast	Maharani Soyarabai	
2022	Pawankhind	Maharani Soyarabai	
