= Tulsidham Ke Laddu Gopal =

Indian Social-Mythological television series

- Genre: Mythology; Social
- Created by: C.L Saini
- Screenplay by: C.L Saini; Santosh
- Story by: C.L Saini; Sheshnath Pandey; Dialogues; Shivendra
- Directed by: Pardeep Jadhav
- Creative director: Dixit Kaul
- Starring: Akshita Mudgal; Heth Makhwana
- Opening theme: Laddu Gopal
- Ending theme: Deepesh gangawat as a mahadev
- Composers: Lenin Nandhi; Shashi Bhooshan
- Country of origin: India
- Original language: Hindi
- No. of seasons: 1
- No. of episodes: 191

Production
- Producer: C.L Saini
- Animators: VFX: Creative Boys VFX Studio LLP; Sunil Vyas; Siddharth
- Editors: Manga Kacharla; Paramesh Kacharla; Anurag Pandey
- Camera setup: Multi-camera
- Running time: 22-24 minutes
- Production company: CLS Entertainment Private Limited

Original release
- Network: Shemaroo TV
- Release: 21 August 2023 – 29 March 2024

Tulsidham Ke Laddu Gopal (transl. Tulsidham's Laddu Gopal) is an Indian Hindi-language Socio-Mytho series starring Akshita Mudgal and Heth Makhwana. It premiered on 21 August 2023 and aired on Shemaroo TV under the banner of CLS Entertainment Private Limited.

== Plot ==
Tulsi is a devotee of Laddu Gopal, and is depicted as the only devotee with the ability to sense his presence. Laddu Gopal is not visible to others, but acts as his devotee's charioteer, guiding and protecting her. Tulsi is portrayed as a faithful follower of Laddoo Gopal, with the ability to perceive his divine presence.

== Cast ==
Main

- Akshita Mudgal as Tulsi: Shyamsundar and Sumitra's daughter (2023–2024)
- Het Makwana as Laddu Gopal (2023–2024)

Recurring

- Gagan Malik as Krishna
- Daya Shankar Pandey as Shyamsundar: Sumitra's husband; Tulsi's father
- Nagesh Salwan as Trigun Solanki: Vasundhara's husband; Nemchand and Angad's father
- Monica Singh as Sumitra: Shyamsundar's wife; Tulsi's mother
- Shivani Gosain as Vasundhara Trigun Solanki: Trigun's wife; Nemchand and Angad's mother
- Ankur Panchal as Angad Solanki: Vasundhara and Trigun's son; Mugdha's husband
- Niya Sharma as Mugdha Angad Solanki: Angad's wife
- Ajit Jha as Nemchand Silanki: Vasundara and Trigun's son; Phalguni husband
- Sneha Tomar as Phalguni: Nemchand's wife; Trigun's daughter-in-law
- Bhavya Sachdeva as Madhav
- Meera Sarang as Gayatri
- Rushiraj Pawar as Asur Raj Banasura
- Shahbaz Khan as Bhairavnath
- Taruna Singh as Kirtan
- Cheshtaa Mehta as
  - Ratnamala
  - Pootna
- Ankur Joshi as Goverdhan : Tulsi's friend
- Chetanya Adib as Rahu
- Anvisha Tyagi as Vrinda
- Sonal Parihar as Rati
- Shantanu Monga as
  - Manohar
  - Kaamdev

=== BhagavadKatha special cast ===
- Hardika Sharma as Radha
- Jatin Bhatia as Nanda
- Nazea Hassan as Yashoda
- Kketan Cchavda
- Javed Pathan as Aristhasur
- Meer Ali as Indra
- Bhumi Gour as Pushpa
- Bhavay Gurnani as Balram
- Anvisha Tyagi as Vrinda
- Ekta Tiwari

== Production ==
The series was announced on Shemaroo TV by CLS Entertainment. Akshita Mudgal as Tulsi and Heth Makhwana as Laddu Gopal were signed as the leads. It is the first original mythology show of Shemaroo TV.

== Soundtrack ==
Kanha Mere Giridhar Gopala

Soundtrack album
- Released: 2023
- Studio: Em square
- Genre: Bhajan
- Length: 1:00
- Language: Hindi
- Label: Shemaroo Entertainment

Tracklisting
No.	Title	Length
1.	"Kanha Mere Giridhar Gopala"	1:00
Total length:		1:00
