= Namah Lakshmi Narayan =

Indian historical television series

- Also known as: Namah Mahalakshmi
- Genre: historical
- Directed by: Vaibhav Vanshraj Singh Lyrics Niraj Prabhakar
- Starring: Savi Thakur; Yukti Kapoor; Vikkas Manaktala
- Theme music composer: Puneet Dixit
- Composer: Puneet Dixit
- Country of origin: India
- Original language: Hindi
- No. of seasons: 1
- No. of episodes: 65

Production
- Producer: Ved Raj
- Camera setup: Multi camera
- Running time: 22 minutes
- Production company: Shoonya Square Productions

Original release
- Network: StarPlus; Hotstar
- Release: 23 September – 20 December 2019

Namah Lakshmi Narayan (previously Namah) is an Indian historical television series that premiered on 23 September 2019 on Star Plus. Produced by Ved Raj under Shoonya Square Productions, it stars Savi Thakur, Vikkas Manaktala and Yukti Kapoor.

Initially it was titled Namah which focused on the friendship of Vishnu and Shiva. In October 2019, it was renamed as Namah Lakshmi Narayan which focused on Vishnu and his wife Lakshmi.

== Cast ==
=== Main ===
- Savi Thakur as
  - Vishnu/Hari: Lakshmi's husband and Parvati's brother
  - Matsya: 1st Dashavatar of Vishnu
  - Kurma: 2nd Dashavatar of Vishnu
  - Varaha: 3rd Dashavatar of Vishnu
- Yukti Kapoor in dual roles as
  - Lakshmi/Matrikas/Shri/Ashta Lakshmi: Vishnu's wife
  - Alakshmi: Lakshmi's sister
- Vikkas Manaktala/Tarun Khanna as Shiva/Mahadev/Virabhadra/Dattatreya: Parvati's husband; Kartikeya, Ashokasundari and Ganesha's father
- Chhavi Pandey/Rachana Parulkar as Parvati/Adi Parashakti/Shakti/Sati/Durga/Yogmaya/ Gauri: Vishnu's sister; Mahadev's wife; Kartikeya, Ashokasundari and Ganesha's mother

=== Recurring ===
- Sushant Marya as Varuna
- Hemant Choudhary as Brahma: Narrator
- Raviz Thakur as Kali
- Sara Khan as kali's wife Mrityu
- Zalak Desai as Saraswati
- Aaditya Bajpayee as Vasuki
- Siddharth Vasudev as Mahishasur
- Puneet Raj as Chandra
- Sachin Chauhan as Shani
- Shivendra Om Saainiyol as Nandi
- Shyam Mashalkar as Narada
- Samriddhi Yadav as Srishti
- Arjun Singh Dalal as Devraj Indra
- Vikas Singh as Bhringi
- Ayan Kapoor as Agni
- Kajal Jain as Mohini
- Amit Behl as Daksha
- Rahul Ranaa as Bali
- Nadeem Ahmad Khan as Surya
- Abhishek Singh as Pawan
- Shivani Gupta as Varuni
- Payal Gupta as Neela
- Anand Dev as Himavan
- Shilpa Kataria Singh as Maina
- Gaurav Bakshi as Garuda
- Sharma Sanjeev Kumar as Samudra
- Aanjaali Rana as Vela
- Deepak Dutta as Manu
- Hemant Bharati as Madhu
- Ravi Chhabra as Kaitabha

== Production ==
=== Development ===
It was originally planned as a weekend program but was later made as a weekday program shortly before the broadcast.

Approximately, ₹30 lakhs are spent per episode for production of this series. Also, 20 VFX agencies were brought in for this series.

In October 2019, the series was renamed from Namah to Namah Lakshmi Narayan, the new iteration focusing mainly on Vishnu and Lakshmi and sidelining the story of Shiva.

Speaking about the introduction of changes in the show, Ved Raj said, "We tried to blend mythology with fantasy, which hasn't managed to strike a chord with the audience. Also, mythological shows mostly focus on just one God, but in our show, we tried to highlight the bond and friendship between Shiva and Vishnu. We have reworked the storyline and are focusing on Vishnu (played by Savi Thakur). The track of Shiva will be reduced considerably, hence the decision to release Vikas. We decided to rope in Tarun, as has played Shiva earlier and wanted someone who will be instantly accepted by the audience".

=== Casting ===
Speaking about his training for his role as Shiva, Vikas Manaktala said, "Martial arts training and working out in the gym helped me get the desired physique for the role. To play Shiva, your expressions and attitude have to be calm. That was really difficult for me. I started meditating and that helped me get the right expressions for the role. Realized that maintaining a calm and composed demeanor on screen was the bigger challenge. To play Shiva, your expressions and attitude have to be calm. That was really difficult for me. I started meditating and that helped me get the right expressions for the role".

In order to increase the ratings of the show, makers introduced many changes in the storyline owing to which actors Vikas Manaktala, Chhavi Pandey and Sara Khan quit the show. Manaktala and Pandey were replaced by Tarun Khanna and Rachana Parulkar.
