= Lakshmi Niwas (Hindi TV series) =

2026 Indian Hindi-language family drama series

- Genre: Family drama
- Created by: Rashmi Sharma
- Based on: Lakshmi Nivasa
- Developed by: Mahesh Rao
- Written by: Dialogue: Munisha Rajpal
- Screenplay by: Lakshmi Jaykumar; Sayli Kedar; Satyaki; Samudyatha
- Directed by: Jaladh K. Sharma; Pawan Kumar Marut
- Starring: Manasi Joshi Roy; Rajendra Chawla; Akshita Mudgal; Raghav Tiwari
- Theme music composer: Rahul Jain
- Opening theme: "Priyatama" by Sonu Nigam & Soumee Salish; Lyrics: Prashant Pandey
- Composer: Ripul Sharma
- Country of origin: India
- Original language: Hindi
- No. of episodes: 301

Production
- Producers: Rashmi Sharma; Pawan Kumar Marut
- Cinematography: Sachin G. Mishra
- Editor: Rakesh Lal Das
- Camera setup: Multi-camera
- Running time: 45 minutes
- Production company: Rashmi Sharma Telefilms

Original release
- Network: Zee TV
- Release: 12 January 2026 – present

Related
- Lakshmi Nivasa

Lakshmi Niwas is an Indian Hindi-language family drama television series which premiered on 12 January 2026 on Zee TV and streams digitally on ZEE5. Produced by Rashmi Sharma Telefilms, the series is a remake of the Kannada drama Lakshmi Nivasa from Zee Kannada. It stars Manasi Joshi Roy, and Rajendra Chawla.

== Cast ==
=== Main ===
- Manasi Joshi Roy as Lakshmi Choudhary Jaiswal: Jagannath's daughter; Vijayendra's sister; Shrinivas's wife (2026–present)
- Rajendra Chawla as Shrinivas "Shri" Jaiswal: Janaki's son; Lakshmi's husband (2026–present)
- Akshita Mudgal as Radhika Jaiswal Chauhan: Lakshmi and Shrinivas's second daughter; Aditya's ex-fiancée; Veer's wife; Niya's foster mother (2026–present)
- Raghav Tiwari as Veer Chauhan: Gajendra and Nalini's younger son; Mahi's ex-fiancé; Radhika's husband; Niya's foster father (2026–present)
- Riya Munjal as Bhoomika "Bhoomi" Jaiswal Bundela: Lakshmi and Shrinivas's youngest daughter; Raj's wife (2026–present)
- Priom Gujjar as Raj Bundela: Bhoomika's husband (2026–present)

=== Recurring ===
- Sulakshana Khatri as Janaki Jaiswal: Shrinivas's mother (2026–present)
- Hemant Thatte as Vivek Jaiswal: Lakshmi and Shrinivas's elder son; Revati's husband; Vihaan's father (2026–present)
- Mansi Srivastava as Revati Jaiswal: Vivek's wife; Vihaan's mother (2026–present)
- Swastik Tiwari as Vihaan Jaiswal: Revati and Vivek's son (2026–present)
- Hritik Yadav as Varun Jaiswal: Lakshmi and Shrinivas's younger son (2026–present)
- Suman Gupta as Aishwarya Chauhan Jaiswal: Gajendra and Nalini's daughter (2026–present)
- Swapnali Patil as Meenakshi Jaiswal: Lakshmi and Shrinivas's eldest daughter; Manish's wife (2026–present)
- Sandeep Kumarr as Manish: Meenakshi's husband (2026–present)
- Nyshita Bajaj as Meenakshi and Manish's daughter (2026–present)
- Mishita Bajaj as Meenakshi and Manish's daughter (2026–present)
- Utsav Singh as Raju "Arjun" Jaiswal: Lakshmi and Shrinivas's foster son; Champa's husband (2026–present)
- Mahi Yadav as Champa Jaiswal: Raju's wife (2026–present)
- Karmveer Choudhary as Jagannath Choudhary: Lakshmi and Vijayendra's father (2026–present)
- Moni Rai as Vijayendra Choudhary: Jagannath's son; Lakshmi's brother; Supriya's widower; Kunal's uncle and foster father (2026–present)
- Swati Pansare as Supriya Choudhary; Vijayendra's late wife; Kunal's aunt and foster mother (2026) (Dead)
- Kinshuk Vaidya as Kunal Chaudhary: Supriya and Vijayendra's adopted son (2026–present)
- Dolly Minhas as Narmada Chauhan: Gajendra's mother (2026–present)
- Sanjivv Jotangia as Gajendra Chauhan: Narmada's son; Nalini's husband; Alok, Aishwarya and Veer's father (2026–present)
- Kajal Pisal / Rashika Matharu as Nalini Chauhan: Gajendra's wife; Alok, Aishwarya and Veer's mother (2026) / (2026–present)
- Rao Ranvijay as Alok Chauhan: Gajendra and Nalini's elder son; Aishwarya and Veer's brother (2026–present)
- Soniya Kaur / Shweta Thakur as Devika Chauhan: Ashok's sister; Alok's wife (2026) / (2026–present)
- Athar Siddiqui as Akhil: Bhairavi's son; Isha's husband (2026–present)
- Ami Joshi as Isha Sahu: Vandana's daughter; Aditya's half-sister; Akhil's wife (2026–present)
- Gurdeep Kohli as Vandana Sahu: Isha's mother; Aditya's step mother (2026) (Dead)
- Gashmeer Mahajani as Aditya Sahu: Vandana's step-son; Isha's half-brother; Radhika's ex-fiancé; Niya's father (2026–present)
- Kesar Kadvani as Nia Jaiswal Chauhan (née Sahu): Aditya's daughter; Veer and Radhika's adopted daughter (2026–present)
- Ashlesha Tavhare Singh as Bhairavi: Akhil's mother (2026)
- Saheb Singh as Ashok: Devika's brother (2026–present)

== Production ==
=== Release ===
The first promo announcing the title with Joshi and Chawla was released on 25 September 2025. A second promo revealing the premise, launch date and time slot was released on 19 December 2025. Lakshmi Niwas premiered on 12 January 2026, replacing Jaane Anjaane Hum Mile at 8.00 p.m. slot.

=== Casting ===
Manasi Joshi Roy and Rajendra Chawla confirmed to play Lakshmi and Srinivas. Akshita Mudgal was selected to play Radhika. Gashmeer Mahajani was chose to play Aditya. Mansi Srivastava was cast as Revati. Priom Dev Gujjar was signed to play the negative lead, Raj. Child actor Kessar Kansara is seen as Niya. Kishuk Vaidya and Athar Siddiqui were cast in prominent roles. Kajal Pisal portraying Nalini Gajendra since January 2026, quit the show in May, citing her character's not so much growth.

=== Filming ===
In February 2026, the crew filmed key sequences in Bangkok whereas Raj take Bhoomika in a luxurious trip as a birthday surprise.

== Soundtrack ==
"Priyatama" was released on 17 December 2025, sung by Sonu Nigam. The lyrics were penned by Prashant Pandey.

No.	Title	Lyrics	Music	Singer(s)	Length
1.	"Priyatama"	Prashant Pandey	Rahul Jain	Sonu Nigam	3:08
Total length:					3:08

== Controversy ==
In March 2026, the scene featuring Raj (Priom Gujjal) eating a cockroach dipped in milk triggered backlash from viewers as disgusting as it was also shown in the Marathi remake Lakshmi Niwas and the Bengali one Kamala Nibas. Viewers compared it to the iconic sequence of Karanvir Bohra's in Dil Se Di Dua.

In July 2026, Raj cooking his wife's pet rabbit he gifted was also received widespread criticism from audience accusing the makers were being insensitive and promoting animal cruelty.

== Adaptations ==
Language	Title	Original release	Network(s)	Last aired	Notes
Kannada	Lakshmi Nivasa ಲಕ್ಷ್ಮೀ ನಿವಾಸ	16 January 2024	Zee Kannada	Ongoing	Original
Malayalam	Manathe Kottaram മാനത്തെ കൊട്ടാരം	12 August 2024	Zee Keralam	3 May 2026	Remake
Marathi	Lakshmi Niwas लक्ष्मी निवास	23 December 2024	Zee Marathi	Ongoing	Remake
Tamil	Gettimelam கெட்டிமேளம்	20 January 2025	Zee Tamil	28 June 2026	Remake
Telugu	Lakshmi Nivasam లక్ష్మీ నివాసం	3 March 2025	Zee Telugu	Ongoing	Remake
Hindi	Lakshmi Niwas लक्ष्मी निवास	12 January 2026	Zee TV	Ongoing	Remake
Bengali	Kamala Nibas কমলা নিবাস	13 April 2026	Zee Bangla	Ongoing	Remake
