= Akshita Mudgal =

Indian television actress (born 2002)

- Born: 9 July 2002 (age 24); Agra, Uttar Pradesh, India
- Occupation: Actress
- Years active: 2012–present
- Known for: Ishk Par Zor Nahi Bhakharwadi

Akshita Mudgal (born 9 July 2002) is an Indian actress well known for her role as Ishqi in Sony Entertainment Television's show Ishk Par Zor Nahi.

== Early life ==
Akshita Mudgal was born on 9 July 2002 in Agra, Uttar Pradesh. She is a professional dancer.

== Career ==
At the age of 10, Akshita came to Mumbai from her hometown Agra and took part in DID Li'l Masters Season 2. After that, she started getting offers in acting and thus, she made her debut on television with Crime Patrol and appeared in more than 50 episodes. Then in 2014, she appeared in a Kannada Film Ugramm. Later, she went ahead to play a role in the 2015 Bindass TV show Zindagi Wins. She also starred as a child artist in the 2015 Emraan Hashmi starring film Mr. X and Akshay Kumar starring film Brothers.

Then she played various supportive characters like one of the cousins in the 2017 SET show Yeh Moh Moh Ke Dhaagey, 2017 & TV show Half Marriage and 2018 & TV show Mitegi Laxman Rekha. In 2019, she first appeared as the parallel lead in Sony SAB show Bhakharwadi opposite Akshay Kelkar. The show wrapped up in 2020 due to COVID-19 pandemic.

She then played the lead role of Ishqi Ahaan Malhotra in SET's popular show Ishk Par Zor Nahi opposite Param Singh. Her chemistry with the actor was immensely praised & adored by admirers and critics equally. Their offscreen camaraderie is very much liked by their admirers who call the duo "Parakshita". Param and Akshita were awarded Best Actor (critics) and Best Actress (critics) respectively at Lions Gold Awards 2021. The show got wrapped up on 20 August 2021 due to creative differences between the production house and the channel.

She then played the lead for Zee TV show Iss Mod Se Jaate hain opposite Hitesh Bharadwaj. Since January 2026, she played Radhika in Zee TV's Lakshmi Niwas.

== Filmography ==
=== Television ===
Year	Serial	Role	Notes	Ref(s)
2012	DID Li'l Masters Season 2	Contestant		
2017	Yeh Moh Moh Ke Dhaagey	Rasika's daughter		
2017	Half Marriage	Reva Sharma		
2018	Mitegi Laxman Rekha	Keerti		
2019–2020	Bhakharwadi	Gayatri Thakkar Gokhale		
2021	Ishk Par Zor Nahi	Ishqi Malhotra		
2021–2022	Iss Mod Se Jaate Hain	Paragi Pathak IAS		
2023–2024	Tulsidham Ke Laddu Gopal	Tulsi		
2026–present	Lakshmi Niwas	Radhika Chauhan		

=== Films ===
Year	Title	Role	Language	Notes	Ref(s)
2014	Ugramm	—N/a	Kannada	Film debut	
2015	Mr. X	—N/a	Hindi		
2015	Brothers	—N/a	Hindi		
2020	Exit		Hindi	Short film	
2021	MMOF – 70 MM	Mahima	Telugu	Telugu debut	
2024	7 Phere- A Dream Housewife	Sudha	Hindi	Short Film	
2025	Karzz	Shanaya	Hindi	Micro Drama	
2025	Kismat Ka king	Monali	Hindi	Micro Drama	
