= Bhakharwadi (TV series) =

Indian television series

- Also known as: Bhakharwadi – Chatpate Rishton Ki Kahani / Bhakharwadi – Zaayke Ka Naya Season
- Genre: Sitcom
- Developed by: Jamnadas Majethia
- Written by: Aatish Kapadia; Ritlal Pandit
- Directed by: Dhaval Jitesh Shukal; Dipesh Harshad Shah
- Starring: See below
- Country of origin: India
- Original language: Hindi
- No. of seasons: 2
- No. of episodes: 327

Production
- Producers: Jamnadas Majethia; Aatish Kapadia
- Cinematography: Vijay Soni; Rahul Soni; Hrishi Mudrale
- Editors: Ashok Rathore; Ajay A Kumar; Sukhi Bharaj
- Camera setup: Multi-camera
- Running time: 21 minutes
- Production company: Hats Off Productions

Original release
- Network: Sony SAB
- Release: 11 February 2019 – 28 August 2020

Bhakharwadi is an Indian comedy television series that premiered on Sony SAB on 11 February 2019. It was produced by Hats Off Productions.

The broadcast of the show was stalled in the last week of March 2020 due to COVID-19 pandemic in India. When it returned, the show wrapped up its shooting and broadcast the last episode on 28 August 2020.

== Series overview ==
Season	No. of episodes	Original broadcast (India)	
Season	No. of episodes	First aired	Last aired
1	292	11 February 2019	25 March 2020
2	35	13 July 2020	28 August 2020

== Plot ==
=== Season 1: Bhakharwadi – Chatpate Rishton Ki Kahani ===
Set in Pune, Bhakharwadi revolves around two neighboring families who are in the same business of Bhakharwadi. The Gujarati Thakkar family consists of Mahindra Thakkar, his wife Urmila, and their only daughter Gayatri. The Marathi Gokhale family consists of Balakrishna "Anna" Gokhale, his wife Jyotsana, and their children Prabhakar, Keshav, Amol, and Abhishek. Anna had disowned his daughter Vibhavri as she married a filmmaker, Jayant, without his consent. All the Gokhale siblings except Abhishek are married and have children.

The Gokhale and Thakkar families have different bitter relations as they have different ideologies. Things get complicated when Abhishek and Gayatri fall in love. Both get married and their families accept it. During their marriage, Abhishek has a plan to tell Anna, that they have opened a Gokhale Bandhu branch in Ahmedabad, but before Anna is told, he finds out himself, and Anna kicks Abhishek out. However Mahendra and Urmila, side with Abhishek, and Gayatri sides with Anna. Thus there are many small arguments that later grow. One of these arguments is when Abhishek becomes Sulakshana, and Mahendra becomes Chandramukhi, two women looking for a job. But they get caught due to Keshav. Tired of these arguments, Abhishek starts to win Anna's trust but gets caught every time. Eventually, Abhishek and Gayatri let go of their differences and reconcile. Gayatri gets pregnant.

=== Season 2: Bhakharwadi – Zaayke Ka Naya Season ===
7 years later

Gayatri and Abhishek have a son named Krishna. The two families are still bitter but pretend to be happy in presence of Krishna. These fights have taken a toll on their health: Anna has impaired hearing, while Mahendra keeps forgetting things easily. Gayatri and Abhishek have been divorced because of a huge misunderstanding involving a third person. Krishna gets to know that his parents have been divorced and the two families separated. As a result, he wants a divorce from his family. Abhishek, Mahendra, and Urmila try to talk to Krishna, where they found out that Krishna knows that Abhishek once also divorced Anna. Anna supports his daughter-in-law Gayatri while on the other hand, the Thakkar family supports Abhishek. The reason behind the divorce was that Gayatri saw Abhishek with another girl named Anjali, during their vacation in a hotel room in Goa. A court hearing takes place at their home itself, which turns out to be inconclusive. Krishna, along with his cousins (Ujwala, Mandar), Chirag (Gayatri's cousin), and Keshav, plans to reunite his parents. He keeps a deal that whoever from his parents gets married first, he will move in with them.
Soon, a man named Aprateem Joshi is discovered and selected by Anna to become Gayatri's groom, whereas the Thakkars' selects a girl named Aishwarya to be Abhishek's bride.
However, it is revealed that Aprateem and Aishwarya are actually Bhojpuri goons-in-disguise named Munna Pandey and Munni Pandey. Munna, a lender, gives Keshav some money for a month at 5% interest but Munna deceives him and says he charged 5% interest per day and threatens Keshav. At the time, Keshav overhears Munna talking about getting his sister, Munni Pandey married. Hearing this a devious plan hatches in Keshav's mind to avoid paying the money and proposes to Munna to get his sister married to Abhishek. Munna accepts the offer and Keshav starts training them accordingly and sends them as Aprateem Joshi and Aishwarya respectively to Gokhale and Thakkar families. Keshav also uses Krishna, Chirag, and Ujjwala for his devious plan. Both manage to win the hearts of the families without suspicion and Munni gets set to actually marry Abhishek. However, Munna wants to actually marry Gayatri for her property, shop, and house and threatens to kill Keshav if this doesn't happen.
Mandar, Ujjwala, and Mahendra overhear this conversation and find out about everything. They are caught before they could inform anyone by Munna and taken hostage. Meanwhile, Urmila and Chirag try everything they can to find out about Anjali online, but she finally blocks them. Abhishek manages to free Ujjwala, Mandar, and Mahendra from the goons and everyone rushes to stop the marriage. However, upon telling Anna and Gayatri about this, they refuse to agree and are adamant. They try everything to stop the marriage but to no avail. Keshav refuses to speak about anything for fear of his life. Right at their last ritual of marriage, Krishna prays for a miracle and Anjali finally comes to stop the marriage and clears Gayatri's doubt. Anjali reveals that her marriage was fixed with a bad guy; Abhishek was helping her by pretending to be her lover and was not having an extramarital affair. Thus, Gayatri realizes her mistake. Abhishek and Gayatri get married again.

The Thakkars and Gokhales' are now in a hilarious argument as to where Krishna will live. Krishna manages to calm them and resolve their fight. The show concludes as Anna and Mahindra say that their relationship is like Bhakarwadi: sweet, sour, and tangy!

== Cast ==
=== Main ===
- Deven Bhojani as Balkrishna "Anna" Gokhale – Radhika Wagle's brother; Jyotsna's husband; Prabhakar, Keshav, Vibhavri and Amol's father; Abhishek's adoptive father; Sucheta, Mandar, Ujjwala, Bandya, Menaka and Ram's grandfather; Krishna's adoptive grandfather. He is Marathi. (2019–2020)
- Paresh Ganatra as Mahendra Thakkar – Urmila's husband; Gayatri's father; Chirag's uncle; Krishna's grandfather. He is Gujarati. (2019–2020)
- Smita Saravade as Jyotsna Gokhale – Anna's wife; Prabhakar, Keshav, Vibhavri and Amol's mother; Abhishek's adoptive mother; Sucheta, Mandar, Ujjwala, Bandya, Menaka and Ram's grandmother; Krishna's adoptive grandmother. (2019–2020)
- Bhakti Rathod as Urmila Thakkar – Komila's sister; Mahendra's wife; Gayatri's mother; Chirag's aunt; Krishna's grandmother. She is from Rajkot, Gujarat. (2019–2020)
- Akshay Kelkar as Abhishek Gokhale– Rasila's son; Anna and Jyotsna's adopted son; Prabhakar, Keshav, Vibhavri and Amol's adopted brother; Gayatri's husband; Krishna's father. (2019–2020)
- Akshita Mudgal as Gayatri Gokhale (nee: Thakkar) – Mahendra and Urmila's daughter; Abhishek's wife; Krishna's mother. (2019–2020)
- Harminder Singh as Krishna Gokhale – Gayatri and Abhishek's son. (2020)
- Nitin Bhatia as Mandar Gokhale – Prabhakar and Bharti's son; Suchita's brother. (2020)
  - Nishkarsh Dixit as Child Mandar Gokhale (2019–2020)
- Prashant Savaliya as Chirag Ghelani – Urmila's nephew; Ujwala's love interest. (2020)
- Devanshi Somaiya as Ujjwala Gokhale – Keshav and Nirmiti's daughter; Chirag's love interest. (2020)
  - Hiya Bhatt as Child Ujjwala Gokhale (2019–2020)
- Krunal Pandit as Keshav Gokhale – Anna and Jyotsana's second son; Prabhakar, Vibhavri and Amol's brother; Abhishek's adopted brother; Nirmiti's husband; Ujjwala's father. (2019–2020)
- Tarka Pednekar as Nirmiti Gokhale – Keshav's wife; Ujjwala's mother (2019–2020)
- Jayesh More as Prabhakar Gokhale – Anna and Jyotsana's eldest son; Keshav, Vibhavri and Amol's brother; Abhishek's adopted brother; Bharati's husband; Mandar and Suchita's father. (2019–2020)
- Tejal Adivarekar as Bharati Gokhale – Prabhakar's wife; Mandar and Suchita's mother (2019–2020)
- Khanjan Thumbar as Amol Gokhale – Anna and Jyotsana's youngest son; Prabhakar, Keshav and Vibhavri's brother; Abhishek's adopted brother; Supriya's husband; Bandya and Menka's father. (2019–2020)

=== Recurring ===
- Rasika Vengurlekar as Vibhavri Gokhale Ambegaonkar – Anna and Jyotsna's daughter; Prabhakar, Keshav and Amol's sister; Abhishek's adopted sister; Jayant's wife; Ram's mother. (2019)
- Kunnal Sheth as Jayant Ambegaonkar – Vibhavri's husband; Ram's father. (2019)
- Unknown as Ram Ambegaonkar – Vibhavri and Jayant's son. (2019)
- Aishani Yadav as Suchita Gokhale – Prabhakar and Bharati's daughter; Mandar's sister. (2019)
- Aarian Sawant as Bandya Gokhale – Amol and Supriya's son; Menka's brother. (2019–2020)
- Kreshaa Shah as Menka Gokhale – Amol and Supriya's daughter; Bandya's sister. (2019–2020)
- Pratik Parihar as Patil (2019–2020)
- Ajay Jadhav as Yogesh Barve (2019-2020)
- Simple Kaul Loomba as Komila – Urmila's sister (2019–2020)
- Pallavi Pradhan as Rasila Malviya – Abhishek's mother (2020)
- Prakash Waghela as Fake inspector (2019)
- Satyavrat Mudgal as Naik (2019)
- Bhakti Chauhan as Rupal, Kalpesh's wife and Mahendra's cousin sister (2019)
- Tushar Kapadia as Kalpesh, Rupal's Husband, Urmila's Cousin Brother (2019)
- Amit Soni as Mr. Parag Shinde, Hotel Manager / Mr. Daftari, Abhijeet Ogle's Personal Secretary (2019)
- Juned Ahmed as Ahmed, Anna's Customer (2019)
- Muhemmed Eqbal as Various characters

=== Special appearances ===
- Nikhil Ratnaparkhi as Munna (2019)
- Gautam Rode as Abhijeet Annasaab Oagle (2019)
- Vaidika Senjaliya as Radha (2020)
- Abraam Pandey as Santosh (2020)
- Amit Dolawat as Munna Pandey (2020)
- Vindhya Tiwary as Actress Shaila Anand (2019) / Munni Pandey; Munna Pandey's sister (2020)
- Angad Mahaskar as Ramchandra Gokhale, Anna 's real Tau (2019)
