= Niti Taylor =

Indian actress (born 1994)

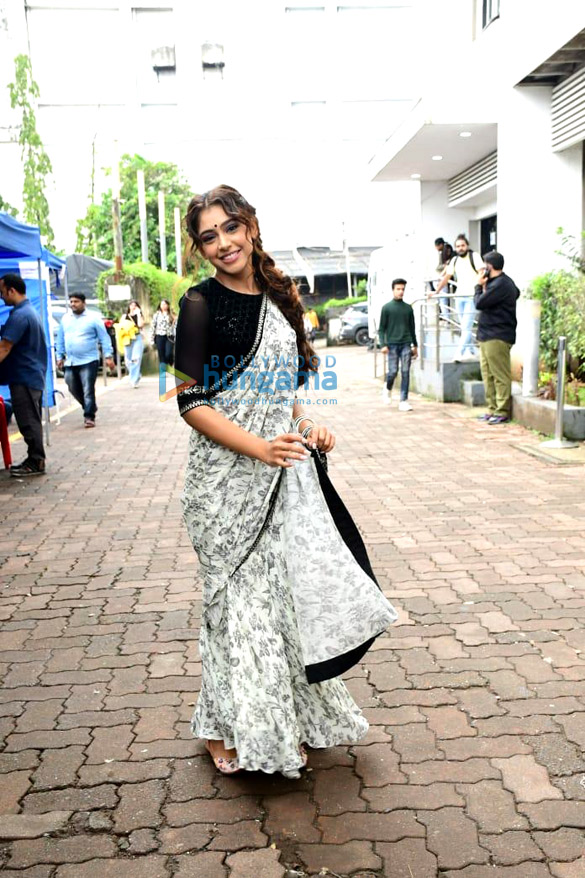
- Taylor in 2022
- Born: 8 November 1994 (age 32); Delhi, India
- Occupations: Actress; Host
- Years active: 2009–present
- Known for: Kaisi Yeh Yaariyan Ghulaam Alliance Prime
- Spouse: Parikshit Bawa (m. 2020)

Niti Taylor (born 8 November 1994) is an Indian actress who primarily appears in Hindi television shows. She is known for her roles in Kaisi Yeh Yaariaan, Ghulaam and Ishqbaaz.

== Early life ==
Taylor was born in Delhi on 8 November 1994 to a Gujarati father and a Bengali Christian mother from Kolkata.

== Career ==
At the age of 15, Taylor made her television debut with Pyaar Ka Bandhan in 2009. Her breakthrough came through her role of Nandini Murthy in MTV India's Kaisi Yeh Yaariyan, opposite Parth Samthaan.

In 2016 she appeared in the music video "Parindey Ka Pagalpan" opposite Siddharth Gupta. In 2017, she portrayed the character of Shivani in crime thriller Ghulaam opposite Param Singh. In 2019, Taylor portrayed the character of Mannat Kaur Khurana in Ishqbaaz . The same year she appeared in a Punjabi-language music video "Cappuccino". In 2022, she participated in Jhalak Dikhhla Jaa 10 and was paired with choreographer Akash Thapa. They were eliminated in the semi-final weekend.

In 2023, Taylor was seen portraying Prachi Kapoor opposite Randeep Rai in Sony TV's Bade Achhe Lagte Hain 2.

== Personal life ==
Taylor got engaged to her boyfriend Parikshit Bawa on 13 August 2019. They married a year later on 13 August 2020.

== Media image ==
In December 2015, UK based newspaper Eastern Eye's List of 50 Sexiest Asian Women, she ranked 15th position as highest placed newcomers. Taylor ranked 12th in Eastern Eye's list of 50 sexiest Asian Women in 2016. In Eastern Eye's Top of 50 Sexiest Asian Women, she ranked 10th in 2018. She is also one of the most followed television actress on Instagram.

== Filmography ==
=== Films ===
Year	Title	Role	Language	Ref(s)
2012	Mem Vayasuku Vacham	Dilruba "Dil" Begum	Telugu	
2013	Pelli Pustakam	Niti	Telugu	
2014	Love Dot Com	Shravani	Telugu	

=== Television ===
Year	Title	Role	Notes	Ref.
2009	Pyaar Ka Bandhan	Ishita		
2010–2011	Gulaal	Devika		
2011–2014	Bade Achhe Lagte Hain	Naina		
2012	Savdhaan India	Saba		
2013	Yeh Hai Aashiqui	Trisha	Season 1	
2013	Webbed	Divya		
2014	Halla Bol	Swati		
2014–2015	Kaisi Yeh Yaariaan	Nandini Murthy	Season 1 - Season 2	
2016	Pyaar Tune Kya Kiya	Vidhi		
2016	Pyaar Tune Kya Kiya	Host	Season 7	
2017	Ghulaam	Shivani		
2018	Laal Ishq	Chitra Sachdev	Episode 3	
2019	Ishqbaaz	Mannat Kaur Khurana		
2019	Khatra Khatra Khatra	Guest		
2022	Jhalak Dikhhla Jaa 10	Contestant	Semi Finalist	
2022	Bigg Boss 16	Guest		
2023	Bade Achhe Lagte Hain 2	Prachi Kapoor		

=== Web shows ===
Year	Title	Role	Notes	Ref.
2018 - 2023	Kaisi Yeh Yaariaan	Nandini Murthy	Season 3 - Season 5	
2021	Indian Game Show	Guest		
2022	Social Squad	Host		
2026	Alliance	Contestant	Amazon Prime Video Semi Finalist	

=== Music videos ===
Year	Title	Singer(s)	Language	Ref.
2018	Gussa	Big Dhillon	Punjabi	
2018	Halka Halka Surroor hai	Stebin Ben	Hindi	
2018	Fans Nahi Friends	Palash Muchhal	Hindi	—N/a
2018	Mere Yaar	Veekay	Punjabi	
2019	Cappuccino	R. Naaz	Punjabi	
2020	Baashinda	Arko, Ankit Tiwari, Ragini Tandon	Hindi	
2022	Naina Mere	Suyyash Rai	Hindi	
2023	Tu Aashiqui Hai Meri	Payal Dev, Stebin Ben	Hindi	
2024	Mahiyaa	Sameer Khan, Sunny Vik	Hindi	
2024	Sui Ve Sui	Meet bros., Kanika Kapoor	Punjabi	
2025	Tareefan	Jubin Nautiyal, Rochak Kohli	Punjabi	
2026	Roka	Shivang Mathur	Hindi	
