= Kaisi Yeh Yaariaan =

Indian youth show

- Genre: Romance; Comedy; Drama
- Screenplay by: Richa Yamini
- Directed by: Lalit Mohan; Ashima Chibber; Vikas Gupta; Rajeev Raj; Shashank Bhardwaj; Karishmaa Oluchi (season 2)
- Starring: See below
- Country of origin: India
- Original language: Hindi
- No. of seasons: 5
- No. of episodes: 366

Production
- Producers: Neeraj Dhingra; Swati Saha; Kamaal R Khan
- Cinematography: Mangesh Mahadik
- Camera setup: Multi-camera
- Production company: BBC Studios India

Original release
- Network: MTV India
- Release: 21 July 2014 – 31 December 2015
- Network: Voot
- Release: 15 May 2018 – 23 December 2022
- Network: JioCinema
- Release: 2 September – 24 September 2023

Kaisi Yeh Yaariaan (How Is This Friendship) is an Indian television series that premiered on MTV India on 21 July 2014. It ran for two seasons before it was cancelled at MTV. The third and fourth seasons debuted over the air on Voot in May 2018 and December 2022, respectively. The fifth season premiered on JioCinema on 2 September 2023.

== Plot ==
=== Season 1 ===
At S.P.A.C.E Academy, attended by Nandini Murthy and her best friend Navya Naveli, FAB5 consists of Manik Malhotra (leader, lead vocalist and Nyonika's son), Cabir (drummer), Mukti (guitarist), Dhruv (guitarist and vocalist) and Alya (keyboardist and Manik's girlfriend). Manik and Nandini become close.

The night before the talent competition, Manik tells Nandini how he feels and they kiss. He learns that Dhruv, his best friend, also has feelings for Nandini. Manik decides to step aside, and breaks up with Nandini on Musicana night. Her band loses the competition.

Navya falls for Harshad, Alya's brother and Mukti's former lover. He forms NH3 with Navya, Shahid and Nandini. FAB5 wins Musicana; Harshad plays a video of Cabir and his teacher, Raghav, which outs them. After beating up Cabir on Musicana day, Harshad and Navya have sex.

Navya becomes pregnant after her night with Harshad, but he denies responsibility. She tells him that she will become stronger for her baby. When she is expelled from S.P.A.C.E. due to her pregnancy, Nandini and FAB5 campaign to bring her back. Cabir and Navya become roommates, and he tells Navya's mother he will give the baby his name and raise it as his own.

Manik tells Nandini that he would not have broken up with her if not for Dhruv, and she accuses him of selfishness. Jealous of obsessed fan Soha Khurana, Nandini and Manik realise their feelings for each other during a New Year's party but decide to take things slowly. Soha tries to kill Nandini in a fire, but Manik saves her. When Nandini learns that Soha died in the fire, she says nothing in court when asked if Manik had anything to do with Soha's death. Manik thinks that she does not trust him. He is acquitted, and decides that if Nandini sings with him at the Fusion Concert they may reconcile.

Mukti falls for Abhimanyu, a cancer patient who reminds her that joy exists. Dhruv and Alya's relationship ends, and he leaves FAB5. Manik is jealous of Trilok Chaurasya, Nandini's Fusion Concert teacher.

Manik and Nandini sing together at the concert, and Dhruv tries to mend fences with FAB5. Manik tells Nandini after the concert that he loves her, but Trilok kidnaps her and she develops PTSD. He helps her overcome her trauma a day before her 18th birthday, when she tells Manik that she loves him.

Alya becomes depressed and develops an eating disorder. On Friendship Day, she announces that she wants to leave FAB5 and begin a new life.

FAB5 win the S.P.A.C.E Talent Hunt, and Manik and Nandini have sex. Aryaman invites FAB5, Nandini and Navya to a dinner party, and Manik and Cabir have a car accident.

=== Season 2 ===
Three months later, Manik is missing and Cabir is apparently dead. Nandini misses Manik, and throws a birthday party for him. Navya cares for her newborn son, Abir. Alya and Dhruv remain friends. Madhyam Singhania (Maddy) is a spoilt brat with a voice like Manik's. He and Nandini dislike each other, and he stands in the election against Nandini and Harshad. Nandini, who knows that Manik is alive and well somewhere, learns that Nyonika was involved in the accident.

Manik returns; his father saved him, and he had been in Pune. He thinks that his friends and Nandini have created a new FAB5. Nandini corrects him, and tells him about Nyonika's involvement in the blast. Manik tells FAB5 that he could not save Cabir, and sadly remembers him playing the drums. Maddy is thrown out of his house, but Aryaman takes him to his place. Aryaman arrives at a party, but Manik is cool. Aryaman feels out of place and used by FAB5, and Harshad tries to break him and Manik apart.

Manik and Nandini spend the night together, happily drunk under the stars and stealing beer bottles. Maddy and Manik become rivals, and Manik challenges him to perform the song written by FAB5. FAB5 perform, winning Maddy over. Dhruv is insecure about Alya, and Manik advises him to be single for a while. Dhruv breaks up with Alya, saying that she is happier with her boss Varun. He says goodbye to Manik and Alya and leaves. Manik breaks down, and is diagnosed with PTSD (PTSD) caused by the accident. Nandini, Aryaman and Navya qualify for Musicana, and Navya decides to surrender Abir for adoption.

Nandini decides to go with Manik to Denmark for his treatment, and he accepts Aryaman as Nandini's friend. Manik and Nandini reaffirm their love, saying that they will be together forever. Mukti, Alya and Manik jam together one last time for New Year and ask Aryaman to join them on drums. While they play, Manik reminiscences, and Navya and Nandini smile.

Navya considers a gay couple as Abir's adoptive parents but ultimately decides to keep him. Mukti goes solo to join an international music house, and Alya signs a contract to work in fashion design. Harshad becomes president of S.P.A.C.E after Maddy leaves the city, and Aryaman wishes Nandini and Manik well.

=== Season 3 ===
Nandini and Manik, together for six years, have moved back to Mumbai. Rishabh is still at a Danish university. Manik is a rock star, and Nandini is a government astrophysicist. Mukti runs a cafe and is engaged to Zubin, who is affectionate and unemployed. Nandini proposes to Manik, who declines. Nandini takes Mukti's advice and decides to take a break from Manik to make him jealous. Inaya, Manik's flirtatious co-star, kisses him in public. Manik leaves Nandini, but they still love each other.

Nandini meets Smaran on a date. Manik says that he doesn't want to be with Nandini anymore to avoid hurting her like his father hurt Nyonika by abruptly leaving her with no explanation, and thinks that Nandini deserves better. Smaran, aware of Nandini's relationship with Manik and chosen for Nandini by her uncle and aunt, asks for Inaya's help to impress her.

Zubin's sister, Jeff, has a crush on Mukti. To break up Mukti's marriage, she tells her that Zubin is an escort who lied to Mukti because of his fear of losing her. Nandini talks about Manik to his father, saying that he destroyed Manik's life by abandoning him when he needed him the most. Manik's parents reconcile, making him optimistic about a future with Nandini.

Mukti cancels her wedding, and Zubin goes missing. Nandini and Manik search for him, going to the house of a woman who mistakes them for her children. They realise that they cannot live without each other. They announce that Mukti is getting married, anticipating that Zubin will hear the news and return. Manik realises that he can live his own life, without the influence of his family. Manik proposes to Nandini on Mukti's wedding day; she declines, but they decide to stay together with no expectations.

=== Season 4 ===
Two years later, Nandini and Manik have broken up. She is a classical-music teacher in Mangalore, and he lives a hermit's life in a van in the jungle near Kasauli.

Manik's fangirl videos him playing guitar. She posts the video, which goes viral. Nyonika visits Manik and tells him about acquiring Malhotra Industries. He takes charge of his father's company again, opening a singing and creative academy in Goa called S.P.A.C.E. Rishabh applies to S.P.A.C.E. but is rejected by Manik. Rishabh urges Nandini to talk to Manik, and she visits him in Goa after a six-month separation. Manik realises that Nandini sees him as a monster again, and breaks down.

He asks Nandini to be his girlfriend again to defeat Nyonika. She agrees, so Rishabh is admitted to S.P.A.C.E. A year earlier, Nandini was pregnant with Manik's child. Two months into the pregnancy, her doctor advises Manik and Nandini to terminate the pregnancy due to bleeding in her womb. Manik tries to cheer up the heartbroken Nandini, but she mistakes his optimism for indifference and breaks up with him. Manik reveals that he hid his feelings only because he saw her sacrifice her dreams for the baby and experiencing trauma after the abortion. They reconcile, emotionally.

=== Season 5 ===
Nandini arranges a surprise party for Manik, but Alya assumes that the party is for her birthday. At the party, Manik and Nandini unsuccessfully try to slip away. When Kashin, a member of Vibe – the band Manik is mentoring – passes out from a seafood allergy, Manik calls her brother Omkar (Nandini's boss from her space-travel programme). Omkar asks Manik about Nandini's decision about the programme, but Nandini never told him about the offer. When Manik asks her about it, she says she is considering it. Nyonika is concerned about losing control of Manik again with Nandini back, and threatens him with pulling out of in S.P.A.C.E if he stays with her.

At home, Nandini is sad after looking at her sonogramss. Manik finds her, and she says she thinks her career killed their baby and she cannot return to her job or the Space Travel Programme because it reminds her of her loss. He consoles her, and convinces her to return to her job.

At S.P.A.C.E, Manik combines his and Nandini's former bands to form a six-member band for the Musicana. The band includes Rishabh (Nandini's Brother), Advait, Seher, Yuvaan, Latika and Kashin. Advait, the son of Nyonika's boyfriend, has been passing information about Manik and Nandini along to her. Manik learns about this with the help of Rishabh, and warns Advait. The two bands, talented individually, struggle to work together at first.

On the day of Musicana, Nandini learns that Manik has submitted her application to the Space Travel Programme and is angry at him for not letting her make the decision. During Manik's opening performance, the lights go off; he panics, but Nandini sings from the crowd to help him. She forgives him.

Nyonika announces onstage that S.P.A.C.E Goa is bankrupt without her share. Manik introduces his father, who announces that there are no financial problems. When Vibe is due to play, Advait is missing; Kashin has learned that Advait is non-binary, and threatens to out him. Missing one member, Vibe cannot play.

On day two of Musicana, Manik brings everyone together and urges them not to keep secrets. They do, and they get ready for the performance; Vibe wins the Musicana. Seher asks Manik and Nandini to adopt her child. They agree, and Manik proposes to Nandini. Manik and Nandini marry, and Manik tells Nyonika to stay away from his family.

== Cast ==
=== Main ===
- Parth Samthaan as Manik Malhotra: A rock star, member of FAB5, founder of S.P.A.C.E GOA, Shrikant and Nyonika's son, Cabir's best friend, Nandini's lover turned husband and Noor's adoptive father
- Niti Taylor as Nandini Manik Malhotra: Former member of NH3, astrophysicist at NSRU GOA, member Of The Space Travel Programme, Rishabh's elder sister, Navya's Best friend, Manik's lover turned wife and Noor's adoptive mother
- Ayaz Ahmed as Cabir Dhawan: Member of FAB5; Raghav's ex-boyfriend, Navya's roommate, Manik's best friend and Abir's adoptive father
- Veebha Anand as Navya Naveli (seasons 1–2): Former member of NH3, Harshad's ex-girlfriend, Nandini's best friend, Cabir's roommate and Abir's mother
- Utkarsh Gupta as Dhruv Vedant: Member of FAB5, had a crush on Nandini; Alya's on-again-off-again boyfriend
- Krissann Barretto as Alya Saxena (seasons 1-2, 4-5): Member of FAB5, Harshad's sister, Manik's ex-girlfriend and Dhruv's on-again-off-again girlfriend
- Charlie Chauhan as Mukti Vardhan: Member of FAB5, Harshad's ex-girlfriend, Abhimanyu's love interest (until his death), Zubin's fiancé and wife (season 1,2,3)
- Abhishek Malik as Harshad Saxena: Former leader of NH3, Alya's brother, Mukti and Navya's ex-boyfriend, and Abir's biological father
- Kishwer Merchant as Niyonika Malhotra: Manik's mother and the head of S.P.A.C.E. Academy
- Karan Jotwani as Aaryamaan Khurana (seasons 1–2): Soha's brother and friend of Nandini who is in love with her, unbeknownst to Nandini
- Aayush Shokeen as Rishabh: Nandini's younger brother, student at S.P.A.C.E Goa (season 4), member of Vibe (season 5), and Latika's love interest
- Binita Budhathoki as Seher: Noor's biological mother and student at S.P.A.C.E Goa, member of Vibe
- Sagar Parekh as Yuvan: Student at S.P.A.C.E Goa, member of Vibe, Alya's love interest, Latika's friend who has a crush on her
- Manan Bhardwaj as Latika: Student at S.P.A.C.E Goa, member of Vibe, Yuvaan's childhood friend, Rishabh's love interest
- Janya Khandpur as Kashin: Student at S.P.A.C.E Goa, member of Vibe, and Omkar's sister
- Ayush Tandon as Advait: student at SPACE Goa, Member of Vibe, Dushyant's son.
- Mehul Nisar as Venkatesh Murthy, Nandini's uncle
- Ritu Vashisht as Shannoo Murthy, Nandini's aunt

=== Recurring ===
- Dishank Arora as Pandit Trilok Chaurasiaa, Nandini's tutor who is obsessed with her
- Rushad Rana as Professor Raghav, a teacher at S.P.A.C.E. Academy and Cabir's former lover
- Zain Imam as Abhimanyu Thakkar; Mukti's love interest; Nandini's friend, was suffering from cancer and eventually died( season 1)
- Jasmine Avasia as Soha Khurana; Aryamaan's sister and obsessive fan of Manik
- Ruma Sharma as Riddhima
- Kabeer Khan as Rocky
- Riney Aryaa as Anusha
- Yuvraj Thakur as Madhyam (Maddy) Singhania
- Dhiraj Totlani as Sunny Sharma
- Pulkit Bangia as Shahid, a member of NH3
- Scarlett Rose as Rose, Cabir's imaginary girlfriend
- Aakash Talwar as Varun
- Rinku Dhawan as Cabir's mother
- Neha Bam as Navya's mother
- Mallika Nayak as Mukti's mother
- Micky Makhija as Avinash Khurana, father of Aryamaan and Soha
- Pranay Pachauri Singh as Zubin, Mukti's eventual husband
- Barkha Singh as Jeffrina (Jeff), Zubin's sister
- Radhika Bhangia as Inaaya
- Meherzan Mazda as Smaran
- Ayaz Khan as Shrikant Malhotra, Manik's father
- Kishori Murthy as Amms, Nandini's grandmother
- Punit Tejwani as Dushyant, Nyonika's boyfriend and Advait's father
- Palash Tiwari as Omkar, Nandini's boss and Kashin's brother
- Baby Noor as Noor Murthy-Malhotra: Manik and Nandini's adoptive daughter, Rishab's adoptive niece, and Seher's biological daughter

=== Guest appearances ===
- Shaan
- Sunny Leone
- Emraan Hashmi and Amyra Dastur
- Badshah
- Gautam Gulati
- Pyaar Ka Punchnama 2 team
- Salman Khan and Sonam Kapoor for Prem Ratan Dhan Payo
