= Ankit Mohan =

Indian film and television actor (born 1988)

- Born: 20 January 1988 (age 38); New Delhi, India
- Occupations: Actor; Model
- Years active: 2006–present
- Spouse: Ruchi Savarn (m. 2015)
- Children: 1

Ankit Mohan is an Indian actor who mainly works in Hindi television and Marathi films. He is best known for his role in the television series Sasural Genda Phool, Mahabharat, Kumkum Bhagya, and Naagin 3.

He is known for television shows like Mahabharat, Kumkum Bhagya, Naagin 3, Haiwaan and Kaatelal & Sons as well as the Marathi film Farzand.

== Personal life ==
On 2 December 2015 he married Indian television actress Ruchi Savarn, his co star, whom he met on the sets of Ghar Aaja Pardesi. In September 2021, the couple announced they were expecting their first child. On 7 December 2021, the couple welcomed a baby boy.

== Career ==
Ankit Mohan made his debut in MTV Roadies (season 4). Ankit appeared in Pankaj Kapoor's Mausam, In which he played Ashfaq Hussain, an Air Force officer. He was selected from over 800 guys for the role of Shahid Kapoor's best friend. He has appeared in many Hindi TV serials like Ghar Aaja Pardesi, Basera and Shobha Somnath Ki. He also appeared in Star Plus's Mahabharat as Ashwathama and in Zee TV's Kumkum Bhagya as Aakash. In 2018 Mohan was seen in the superhit Marathi movie Farzand in which he played the title character of the legendary Maratha warrior Kondaji Farzand.

Mohan performed the role of Aakash on the show Kumkum Bhagya until 2016. He played the part of Yuvi in the television show Naagin 3. At first after 7-8 he left as he was shown killed by Vishakha Anita Hassanandani. Again in December 2018 he returned to the show as a shape-shifting serpent son of Nidhogsh Vansh Queen, Sumitra Rakshanda Khan. He was shown killed by Bela Surbhi Jyoti and Vishakha Anita Hassanandani in 2019. Finally, he left the role in April, 2019. He was last seen as the male lead, Vikram in Sony Sab's Kaatelal & Sons opposite Megha Chakraborty.

== Filmography ==
Key
†	Denotes film or TV productions that have not yet been released

=== Films ===
Year	Title	Role	Language	Ref.
2011	Mausam	Ashfaq Hussain	Hindi	
2018	Farzand	Sardar Kondaji Farzand	Marathi	
2019	Fatteshikast	Sarsenapati Yesaji Kank	Marathi	
2020	Mann Fakira	Nachiket	Marathi	
2022	Pawankhind	Shrimant Rayajirao Bandal	Marathi	
2022	Hawahawai		Marathi	
2022	Babli Bouncer	Chirag	Hindi	
2024	Crakk	Nihal Dixit	Hindi	
2024	Singham Again	Sarath	Hindi	
2024	Babu	Baburao	Marathi	
2025	Thamma	Jimmy	Hindi	
2026	Veer Murarbaji †	Murarbaji Deshpande	Marathi	
TBA	Kevin Knife †	TBA		

=== Television ===
Year	Title	Role
2006–2007	MTV Roadies 4	Himself
2007	Kyunki Saas Bhi Kabhi Bahu Thi	
2008	Miley Jab Hum Tum	Ankit
2009	Namak Haraam	Ankit
2009	Kasamh Se	Sudhir
2009	Kis Desh Mein Hai Meraa Dil	Jagvir
2010	Sasural Genda Phool	Akash
2010	Basera	Nitin Deshmukh
2011–2012	Shobha Somnath Ki	Prachandman
2012	Teri Meri Love Stories	Sagar
2013	Ghar Aaja Pardesi	Prateek Pandey
2013–2014	Mahabharat	Ashwathama
2014–2016	Kumkum Bhagya	Akash Ajay Mehra
2015	Begusarai	SP Avinash Shrivastav
2017	Dhhai Kilo Prem	Charan Sharma
2018	Kasautii Zindagii Kay (2018 TV series)	Tarun
2018–2019	Naagin 3	Yuvraj "Yuvi" Sehgal
2019–2020	Haiwaan: The Monster	Ansh
2020	Jag Janani Maa Vaishno Devi - Kahani Mata Rani Ki	Bhairon Nath
2020–2021	Kaatelal & Sons	Vikram
2025	Gatha Shiv Parivaar Ki — Ganesh Kartikey	Śūrapadmā
2026	Gharwali Pedwali	Yaksha

=== Web series ===
Year	Title	Role	Language
2020	Ek Thi Begum	Zaheer Bhatkar	Marathi, Hindi
2022	Double Game	Unknown	Marathi

== Media ==
He was ranked thirteenth in The Times of India's Top 30 Most Desirable Men of Maharashtra in 2019. He was ranked eighteenth in The Times of India's Top 20 Most Desirable Men of Maharashtra in 2020.
