= Ghar Aaja Pardesi =

- Genre: Drama
- Created by: Gajendra Singh
- Written by: Gaurav Desai; Sanjay Joshi; Amitabh Singh
- Directed by: Indraneil Goswami; Inder Das
- Creative director: Kadar kazi(kk)
- Starring: See below
- Theme music composer: Anuj Kappu
- Country of origin: India
- Original language: Hindi
- No. of seasons: 1
- No. of episodes: 95

Production
- Executive producers: Sri Kant; Nishant Verma
- Producer: Gajendra Singh
- Production location: Banaras
- Editors: Avadh Narayan Singh; Sonu Yadav; Sunil Singh
- Camera setup: Multi-camera
- Running time: Approx 23 minutes
- Production company: Saibaba Telefilms

Original release
- Network: Sahara One
- Release: 28 January – 7 June 2013

Ghar Aaja Pardesi (transl. Come home stranger) is an Indian television show that aired on Sahara One from 28 January 2013 to 7 June 2013, produced by Gajendra Singh.

== Cast ==
- Ruchi Savarn as Devika
- Vikram Gokhale as Bhavanishankar Mishra
- Mahesh Thakur as Raghav Mishra
- Anita Kulkarni as Sajni Raghav Mishra
- Smita Jaykar
- Sapna Pabbi / Pooja Banerjee as Rudrani
- Agastya Jain as Ajit Banarasi
- Abir Goswami / Iqbal Azad as Madhav Mishra
- Kashi Tiwari as Guddu Mishra
- Jaideep Suri
- Niyati Joshi
- Geetanjali Mishra
- Vijay Badlani
- Ankit Mohan as Prateek Pandey
