= Param Singh (actor) =

Indian actor (born 1988)

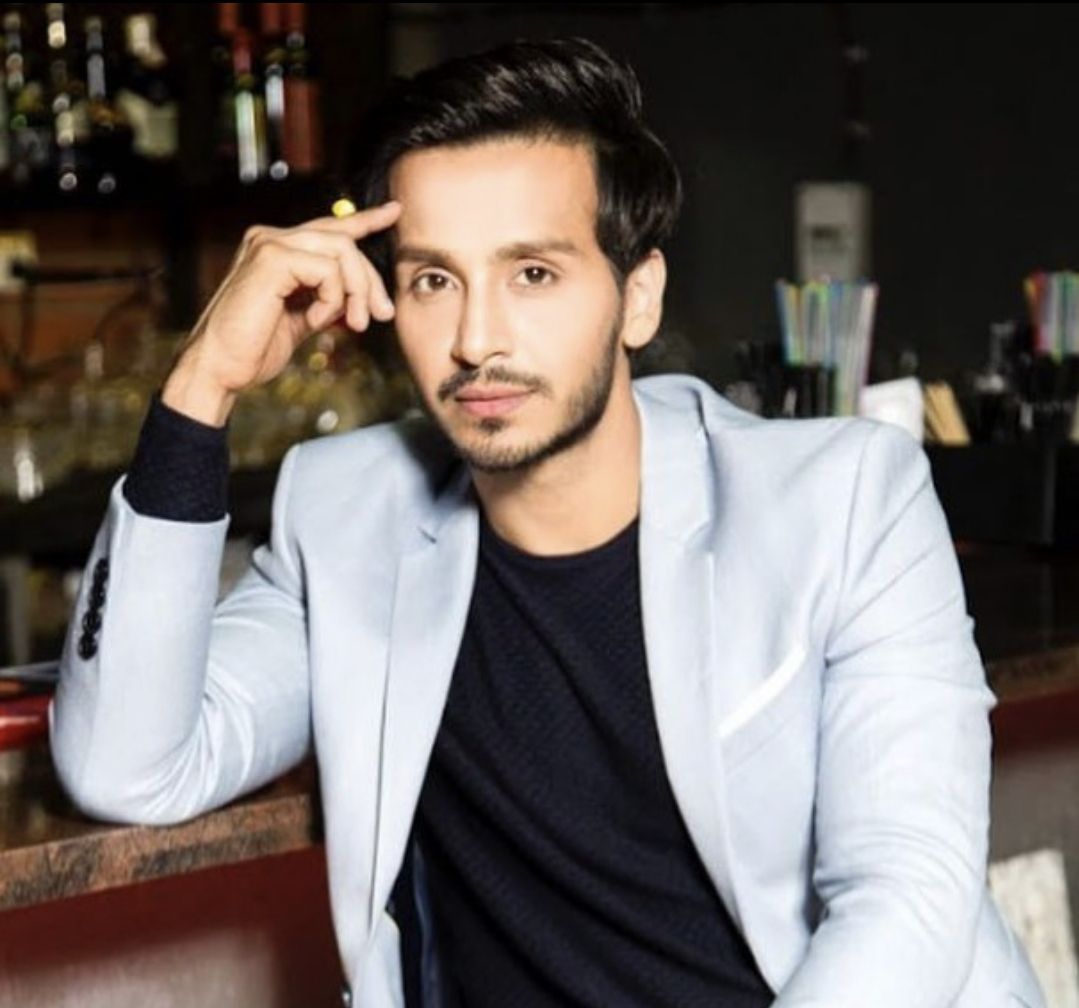
- Born: 8 September 1988 (age 37); Kanpur, Uttar Pradesh, India
- Education: Bcom from Smt. M.M.K College of Commerce & Economics; MBA in Finance from Regent's University London
- Occupation: Actor
- Years active: 2011–present
- Notable work: Sadda Haq; Ghulaam; Haiwaan: The Monster; Ishk Par Zor Nahi; Ghum Hai Kisikey Pyaar Meiin

Param Singh is an Indian actor known for his role of Randhir Singh Shekhawat in the youth TV series Sadda Haq on Channel V India, Rangeela in Ghulaam on Life OK and Ahaan Veer Malhotra in Ishk Par Zor Nahi on Sony Entertainment Television.

== Career ==
Singh started his career with many commercials and a short role in Parvarrish – Kuchh Khattee Kuchh Meethi. He rose to fame with his work in the youth-based TV series Sadda Haq in 2013 where he played the role of Randhir Singh Shekhawat, which aired on Channel V India produced by Inspire Films.

In 2017 he did a show for Life OK named Ghulaam where he essayed the lead character Rangeela, opposite Niti Taylor and Vikas Manaktala.

Later, Singh played Dhruv Narang for Beyond Originals' web series called "Black Coffee", created by Yash A Patnaik and Mamta Patnaik. He has done a lot of plays back in school and college like Helen of Troy. Ardhanareshwar is another play he has added as a feather to his hat.

In 2018 he played Fawad Ashraf in Star Plus's show Mariam Khan – Reporting Live but the show ended in early 2019 due to low TRPs. In August 2019 he signed Balaji Telefilms show Haiwaan: The Monster which aired on Zee TV opposite Ridhima Pandit. He portrayed Randhir Agnihotri a young, fun loving but smart scientist. The show ended on 16 February 2020. He was last seen in one of the recent popular TV show, Sony Entertainment Television's Ishk Par Zor Nahi as Ahaan Veer Malhotra opposite Akshita Mudgal.

From January 2025 until the show ended in July 2025, he played the lead role of Dr. Neelkant "Neil" Pradhan in Ghum Hai Kisikey Pyaar Meiin opposite Vaibhavi Hankare and Bhavika Sharma after a three year television hiatus.

== Television ==
Year	Serial	Role	Notes	Ref(s)
2011–2013	Parvarrish – Kuchh Khattee Kuchh Meethi	Yudhishthir "Yudi" Sharma	Supporting Role	
2013–2016	Sadda Haq	Randhir Singh Shekhawat	Lead Role	
2017	Ghulaam	Rangeela Chaudhary	Lead Role	
2018–2019	Mariam Khan – Reporting Live	Fawad Ashraf	Lead Role	
2019–2020	Haiwaan: The Monster	Randhir Agnihotri	Lead Role	
2021	Ishk Par Zor Nahi	Ahaan Malhotra	Lead Role	
2025	Ghum Hai Kisikey Pyaar Meiin	Dr. Neil Pradhan	Lead Role	
