= Left Right Left (TV series) =

Indian youth show

- Directed by: Anshuman Kishore Singh
- Starring: See below
- Music by: Abhijeet Hegdepatil
- Opening theme: "Left Right Left" by Kunal Ganjawala
- Ending theme: Vishal–Shekhar
- Composer: Vishal–Shekhar
- Country of origin: India
- Original language: Hindi
- No. of seasons: 2
- No. of episodes: 440

Production
- Producers: Tony Singh; Deeya Singh
- Editor: Manish Mistry
- Running time: 20 minutes

Original release
- Network: SAB TV
- Release: 10 July 2006 – 26 September 2008

Left Right Left is an Indian television series that aired on SAB TV. The show was directed by Anshuman Kishore Singh and produced by Tony Singh and Deeya Singh under the banner of DJ's a Creative Unit. The series' second season ended on 26 September 2008.

== Plot ==
=== Season 1 ===
The show is based on Kanchanjunga Military Academy where soldiers are trained to serve the nation. Naveen Singh Ahluwalia, who is the narrator of the show tells his story about how he was framed and labelled as a Traitor. The academy is helmed by Brigadier Chandok and his team of army officers. The story narrates the plot of six youngsters who comes from various backgrounds to take admission in the academy. These youngsters are Naina Singh, Amardeep Huda, Ali Baig, Aalekh Sharma, Yadhuvansh Sahni and Pooja Ghai. Together they join the army and become cadets to serve the nation. They are supported by Captain Rajveer and Dr. Ritu Mishra.

It is suggested that Naina Singh Ahluwalia has joined the academy with a mission to conquer. It is revealed that she is the younger sister of Naveen Singh Ahluwalia who was labelled as a traitor. Naina doesn't believe that her brother was a traitor and hence to prove his innocence and avenge the people who wronged him, she joins KMA to fulfill her goal. Also she vows to become the best cadet of the academy just like her brother. But in order to do so, she hides her real identity. Having witnessed atrocities at an early age by the people who insulted her family, Naina develops hate, anger and disgust for the society particularly with the system in the Indian Army. Thus, transforming into a strong willed, anti-social, aggressive, angry young woman from a bubbly girl she once was.

Captain Rajveer is revealed to be the best friend of Naveen Singh Ahluwalia. Initially, he suspects Naina to be a spy but later helps her out when he discovers her identity. Naina befriends Huda, Ali, Aalekh, Pooja and Yudi and they form a good team. However, Naina's journey doesn't seem to be easy as she is repeatedly confronted by Brigadier, Major Nair and Major Bhargav. Her other support in the academy are Subedaar Suri and Dr. Shalini. Naina's truth is revealed soon and the academy starts hating her. Captain Rajveer, Yudi, Huda, Pooja Ali, Aalekh, Dr. Shalini and Suri stands by her while rest of the academy goes against her. Eventually Naina is given clean chit by Brigadier who asks her to concentrate on becoming an Army officer. It is revealed that Dr. Ritu Mishra is a spy and wants to bring harm to the Army. Rajveer kills Dr. Ritu but is repeatedly attacked by goons sent by the person responsible for framing Naveen.

It is revealed that besides Rajveer, there was another friend of Naveen who was very close to him. Captain Abhimanyu Singh Chauhan joins KMA to help Naina proving Naveen's innocence. In an unexpected turn of events, Rajveer gets framed just like Naveen and gets court martialed by the Brigadier. Naina and Rajveer by this time, develops feelings for each other and fall in love but before their love story could blossom, Rajveer gets killed in an explosion however, his body is never found. Naina with her friends embark on a journey to find about the culprit who had wronged Naveen and Rajveer both. It is revealed that the man behind all the crimes is Lala Gehlot who was very close to both Naveen and Rajveer. After various struggles and hardships, Naina manages successfully to expose Lala's crimes in front of the world. Lala gets arrested however manages to come out from the jail, which is revealed in season two. Naveen Singh Ahluwalia gets justice and his name gets cleared. Naina and the rest of the cadets graduate from KMA and set out to join their postings.

=== Season 2 ===
Season 2 brings seven new cadets into the story: Cadet Sameera Shroff, Cadet Vidya Saxena, Cadet Rummy Gaur, Cadet Peter Subnis, Cadet Markand Mala, Cadet Akriti Bhat and Cadet Purvi Bisht. Just like previous cadets they are new to the academy and they have various missions to fulfill. They are now supported by Captain Gunraj while the rest of the team members from the academy join them. Brigadier Chandok gets replaced by Major General Gaur. The new cadets now finds a new challenge as they have to fight against a new enemy of Nation that is called Eagle. Initially Eagle is known to be Shona Das, but later it is revealed that she is a special officer in the Army. The Eagle turns out to be Lala Gehlot in the end. Due to his political powers, Lala is so powerful that no prison has managed to keep him for long. Convinced that there is no solution to defeat the enemy, Captain Gunny shoots him the end. The rest of the cadets are suspended from the academy but finds a place in the special task force in the Indian Army.

== Cast ==
=== Main ===
- Rajeev Khandelwal as Captain Rajveer Singh Shekhawat: Naina's love interest
- Priyanka Bassi as Cadet Naina Singh Ahluwalia: Naveen's sister;
- Kunal Karan Kapoor as Cadet Yadhuvansh "Yudi" Sahni
- Harshad Chopda as Cadet Ali Baig: Pooja's love interest
- Arjun Bijlani as Cadet Aalekh Sharma
- Vikkas Manaktala as Cadet Amardeep "Amar" Huda
- Ghazal Rai as Cadet Pooja Ghai: Ali's love interest

=== Recurring ===
- Aparna Tilak as Captain Dr. Shalini Singhal
- Shweta Salve as Dr. Ritu Mishra (a spy)
- Gaurav Chopra as Captain Abhimanyu Rai Chauhan, Friend of Rajveer and Naveen
- Samir Sharma as Captain Naveen Singh Ahluwalia: Naina's brother, Rajveer's and Naveen's friend
- Rajesh Khera as Major Bhargav (Antagonist)
- Puneet Issar as Brigadier Chandok
- Deepraj Rana as Major Prabhat Nair (Antagonist)
- Rajesh Khattar as Lala Gehlot (Main antagonist; Rajveer's foster father)
- Ankur Nayyar as Captain Gunraj Singh Randhawa
- Sanjeev Mehra as Suri Ji
- Sujata Kumar as Meera Singh Ahluwalia: Naina's mother
- Abhimanyu Singh as Colonel Shakti Chandra
- Surendra Pal as Virendra Rai Chauhan
- Priya Arya as Subedar Major Lolita Sen
- Ragesh Asthana as Mr.Sahani (Yudi's Father)
- Deepika Amin as Mrs. Sahani (Yudi's Mother)
- Ravi Jhankal as Subedar Baig (Ali's Father)
- Jasveer Kaur as Simranjeet Kaur (Yoga Teacher)
- Manish Khanna as Faculty Inspector
- Vaibhavi Upadhyay as Neelu Sahni

=== Season 2 ===
- Gauri Pradhan Tejwani as Captain Shona Das
- Sanaya Irani as Cadet Sameera Shroff
- Shikha Singh as Cadet Akriti Bhat
- Deeya Chopra as Cadet Vidya Saxena
- Harshvardhan Rane as Cadet Rummy Gaur
- Saurav Chakrabarti as Cadet Peter Subnis
- Mohit Daga as Cadet Markand Malla
- Swati Taldar as Cadet Purvi Bisht
- Hiten Tejwani as Colonel Abhay Verma
- Shraddha Kaul as Major Vaibhavi Sharma
- Sudesh Berry as Major General R.S Gaur

== Reception ==
Rediff.com stated that "Left Right Left lacks authenticity. The sets are too artificial for a primetime serial, and the script leaves much to be desired.
