= Ishk Par Zor Nahi =

Indian television drama series (2021)

- Genre: Drama
- Created by: Gul Khan
- Written by: Divy Nidhi Sharma (Dialogues & Lyrics); Aparajita Sharma (Dialogues)
- Screenplay by: Sudhir Singh; Harneet Singh; Shubham Sharma
- Story by: Sudhir Singh; Harneet Singh; Srinita Bhoumick; Nikita Dhond
- Directed by: Lalit Mohan
- Creative director: Nidhi Jha
- Starring: Param Singh; Akshita Mudgal; Shagun Sharma
- Theme music composer: Tapas Relia
- Opening theme: Tapas Relia
- Ending theme: Tapas Relia
- Country of origin: India
- Original language: Hindi
- No. of seasons: 1
- No. of episodes: 115

Production
- Executive producer: Dipti Kalwani
- Producers: Gul Khan; Karishma Jain
- Production locations: Mumbai, South Delhi, Diu
- Cinematography: Raju Gauli
- Editors: Shashank H. Singh; Krishna mahto
- Camera setup: Multi-camera
- Running time: 22–25 minutes
- Production company: 4 Lions Films

Original release
- Network: Sony TV
- Release: 15 March – 20 August 2021

Ishk Par Zor Nahi (transl. No control on love) is an Indian Hindi-language television drama series. It premiered from 15 March 2021 to 20 August 2021 on Sony TV. It is produced by Gul Khan and Karishma Jain under 4 Lions Films, it stars Param Singh and Akshita Mudgal.

== Plot ==
"Ishk Par Zor Nahi" is a popular television serial known for its intricate portrayal of relationships and complex family dynamics. The story revolves around Ahaan Veer Malhotra, a no-nonsense businessman who holds family values and ethics dear to his heart. In contrast, Ishqi is a young woman who ardently believes in love and encourages others to embrace it.

Their paths collide when Ishqi seeks a ride from Ahaan but gets ejected from his car when he discovers her role in helping a couple elope. In a surprising twist, Ishqi retaliates by stealing Ahaan's car, leading to charges pressed against her and the loss of her job.

Ishqi's destiny takes an unexpected turn as she is set to marry Mayank Kapoor, Ahaan's best friend. However, their relationship is a ruse aimed at making Ahaan's younger sister, Sonu, jealous, who is engaged to Raj Rathore. A dark family secret looms over the narrative – the disappearance of Ahaan's mother, Savitri, who Ahaan resents for abandoning the family. It is later revealed that Savitri was wrongly confined to a mental asylum due to Ahaan's grandmother's actions.

The series concludes on a positive note with Sonu's pregnancy and Ishqi and Ahaan, or 'Ishqaan,' remarrying, promising a happier future. "Ishk Par Zor Nahi" explores themes of love, betrayal, and the complexities of family relationships, leaving viewers captivated by its dramatic and emotional storyline.

== Cast ==
=== Main ===
- Param Singh as Ahaan Veer Malhotra: Veer and Savitri's elder son; Sonu's elder brother. Kartik's cousin; Ishqi's husband.(2021)
- Akshita Mudgal as Ishqi Malhotra: Sudha's niece; Ahaan's wife (2021)
- Shagun Sharma as Sonali "Sonu" Malhotra Rathore: Veer and Savitri's daughter; Ahaan's younger sister, Kartik's cousin. Sarla's daughter-in-law Raj's wife (2021)
- Lakshya Handa as Raj Rathore: Sarla's son; Sonu's husband (2021)
- Rajat Verma as Kartik Malhotra: Ritu and Ved's son; Ahaan and Sonu's cousin. (2021)

=== Recurring ===
- Neha Rana as Rhea Mehta: Viren and Radhika's daughter; Ahaan's ex-fiancée (2021)
- Aakash Gupta as Mayank Kapoor: Shekhar and Suman's son; Ishqi's ex-fiancé (2021)
- Shekhar Gill replaced Gupta as Mayank (2021)
- Abha Parmar as Durga Devi "Dadi" Malhotra: Veer and Ved's mother; Ahaan, Kartik and Sonu's grandmother (2021)
- Mamta Verma as Ritu Malhotra: Ved's wife; Kartik's mom; Ahaan and Sonu's aunt (2021)
- Kapil Soni as Ved Malhotra, Veer's brother; Ritu's husband; Kartik's father; Ahaan and Sonu's uncle (2021)
- Jaswinder Gardner as Savitri Malhotra: Veer's second widow; Sakshi's sister; Ahaan's foster mother; Sonu's mother (2021)
- Kimmy Kaur as Sudha Maasi, Ishqi's maternal aunt (2021)
- Beena Maljie as Sarla Rathore, Raj's mother (2021)
- Arundhati Bandho padhyay as Ginni, Sarla's best friend (2021)
- Preety Arora Sharma as Suman Kapoor, Mayank's mother (2021)
- Jai Singh as Viren Mehta, Rhea's father (2021)
- Hetal Yadav as Radhika Mehta, Rhea's mother (2021)
- Anup Ingale as Bhola, the Malhotras' housekeeper(2021)
- Rajiv Kumar as Suraj: an advocate, Veer's ex-friend(2021)

== Production ==
=== Development ===
The show was in pre-production for a long time. Param Singh signed this show in July 2020, when the production house approached him. Casting for Ishqi's character took a long time and finally Akshita Mudgal signed as Ishqi.

The pandemic's second wave delayed the shoot in mid-April 2021. The cast and crew relocated to Daman and Diu. They came back and resumed shooting in Mumbai in the start of July 2021.

=== Release ===
The first promo of the series was released on 28 February 2021 featuring Param Singh and Akshita Mudgal.
