= Ghulaam =

- Genre: Action; Crime thriller; Romance
- Created by: Saurabh Tewari, Rahil Qaazi
- Screenplay by: Rahil Qaazi
- Story by: Saurabh Tewari
- Directed by: Rajesh Ram Singh; Manchan Thakur Vikal
- Country of origin: India
- Original language: Hindi
- No. of seasons: 1
- No. of episodes: 160

Production
- Producers: Saurabh Tewari; Rahil Qaazi; Rajesh Chadha; Sumeet Chaudhry; Kewal Sethi; Deepak Gurnani
- Cinematography: Ravi Walia
- Camera setup: Multi-camera
- Running time: Approx. 22 minutes
- Production companies: Parin Multimedia Pvt Ltd; Write View Media Pvt Ltd; IMRC Entertainment Pvt Ltd

Original release
- Network: Life OK
- Release: 16 January – 25 August 2017

Ghulaam (transl. Slave) is an Indian action crime thriller television series, which premiered on Life OK on 16 January 2017.

Param Singh, Niti Taylor and Vikkas Manaktala played the lead roles. The thriller series ended on 25 August 2017 due to channel's new line-up policy.

== Synopsis ==
The story revolves around Rangeela who is a slave to Veer. He marries Shivani an innocent girl and later takes her back to Berahmpur and dupes her into marrying his master Veer. But one significant incident where Veer tries to auction Shivani publicly thus humiliating her in front of an assembly full of men makes Rangeela revolt against his master. Thus, begins his journey from slavery to freedom.

== Cast ==
=== Main cast ===
- Param Singh as Rangeela, Ghulaam
- Niti Taylor as Shivani, Rangeela's wife
- Vikkas Manaktala as Chaudhary Veer Pratap, Rangeela's step brother

=== Recurring cast ===
- Aakash Pandey as Balam, Rangeela's friend and confidant
- Sarika Dhillon as Rashmi Khare / Rashmi Manmeet Pratap, Dillīwali, Veer's sister-in-law
- Pradeep Duhan as Chaudhary Manmeet Pratap, Veer's younger brother, Rashmi's husband
- Ridheema Tiwari as Maldawali, Veer's sister-in-law
- Vishal Puri as Chaudhary Jageer Pratap, Veer's elder brother, Maldawali's husband
- Bhagwan Tiwari as Chaudhary Bhishma Pratap, Veer and Rangeela's father
- Zahida Parveen as Chaudhary Gulguli, Veer's mother
- Samta Sagar as Shanti, Rangeela's mother, Bhishma Pratap's wife
- Devi Dolo as Manju, Balam's wife, Rangeela's sister-in-law
- Amit Jaat as Phantom, Rangeela's friend and confidant
- Shahab Khan as Shivani's Uncle
- Nidhi Jha as STS officer Radhika, cameo appearance
- Indraneil Sengupta as STS officer Raghav Verma, Rashmi's fiancé (cameo appearance)
- Viraj Kapoor (kid actor) as Katta, the next Ghulaam
- Ankur Tandon as Rajan as Ring fighter
