= Haiwaan: The Monster =

2019 Indian television series produced by Ekta Kapoor

- Created by: Ekta Kapoor
- Developed by: Ekta Kapoor
- Directed by: Ranjan Kumar Singh
- Creative directors: Chloe Ferns Qureshi; Neeraj Sachdev kadar kazi(kk)
- Starring: Ridhima Pandit; Param Singh; Ankit Mohan; Gayathiri Iyer
- Country of origin: India
- Original language: Hindi
- No. of seasons: 1
- No. of episodes: 49

Production
- Producers: Ekta Kapoor; Shobha Kapoor
- Production locations: Mumbai, India
- Editors: Vikas Sharma; Vishal Sharma; Sandip Bhatt
- Camera setup: Multi-camera
- Production company: Balaji Telefilms

Original release
- Network: Zee TV
- Release: 31 August 2019 – 16 February 2020

Haiwaan: The Monster was an Indian television supernatural series created by Ekta Kapoor under her Balaji Telefilms. It starred Param Singh, Ridhima Pandit and Ankit Mohan.

== Plot ==
The story starts off with Randhir's parents getting killed by Haiwaan (a monster), and Ansh saving Randhir from it.

=== 12 years later ===
Randhir creates a super human in his lab to defeat Haiwaan. Ansh, Randhir's best friend, becomes super human with the help of Randhir. Ansh has a super crush on Amrita, their childhood friend and Randhir constantly ends up having tiffs with Amrita but he soon falls in love with her. Amrita also slowly falls for Randhir. Ansh gets to know about Randhir's love interest and feels betrayed, thus, goes against Randhir. Amrita and Randhir get married. Whereas, Ansh turns into Haiwaan.

== Cast ==
=== Main ===
- Param Singh as Randhir Agnihotri: Scientist by profession, Deepak and Divya's son, Ansh's best friend, Amrita's husband (2019–2020)
- Ridhima Pandit as Amrita Agnihotri (née Sharma): Dharampal's daughter, Randhir's wife, Ansh's friend (2019–2020)
- Ankit Mohan as Anshul "Ansh" Verma: Super human, Randhir's best friend (2019–2020)

=== Recurring ===
- Gayathiri Iyer as Jiyana "Jiya" Garewal: Scientist, Govind's daughter, Chetan's sister (2019–2020)
- Sanjay Gandhi as Dharampal Sharma: Diljit's son; Amrita's father (2019–2020)
- Vineeta Malik as Diljit Sharma: Dharampal's mother; Amrita's grandmother (2019–2020)
- Nikhil Arya as Govind Garewal: Scientist, Chetan and Jiya's father, Deepak's traitor (2019–2020)
- Sahil Phull as Chetan Garewal: Govind's son; Jia's brother (2019–2020)
- Manini Mishra as Vaishali Agnihotri: Manoj's wife; Randhir's aunt; Nisha's mother (2019–2020)
- Hemant Thatte as Manoj Agnihotri: Deepak's brother; Vaishali's husband; Randhir's uncle; Nisha's father (2019–2020)
- Heli Daruwala as Nisha Agnihotri: Manoj and Vaishali's daughter (2019–2020)
- Shourya Lathar as Hardik Patel: Jia's assistant (2019)
- Saurabbh Ravi Dutta as Cafe Valentine’s Journalist (2020)
- Simar Khaira as sardar ji: first episode who killed by haiwaan

=== Cameo ===
- Hiten Tejwani as Deepak Agnihotri: Scientist, Manoj's brother, Divya's husband, Randhir's father, Nisha's uncle (2019)
- Dalljiet Kaur as Divya Agnihotri: Deepak's wife, Randhir's mother, Nisha's aunt (2019)
- Dheeraj Dhoopar (2019)
- Neel Motwani as Ashwathama (2020)
- Chetan Hansraj as Yeti Master (2020)
- Shefali Rana
