= Hemant Choudhary =

Indian television actor

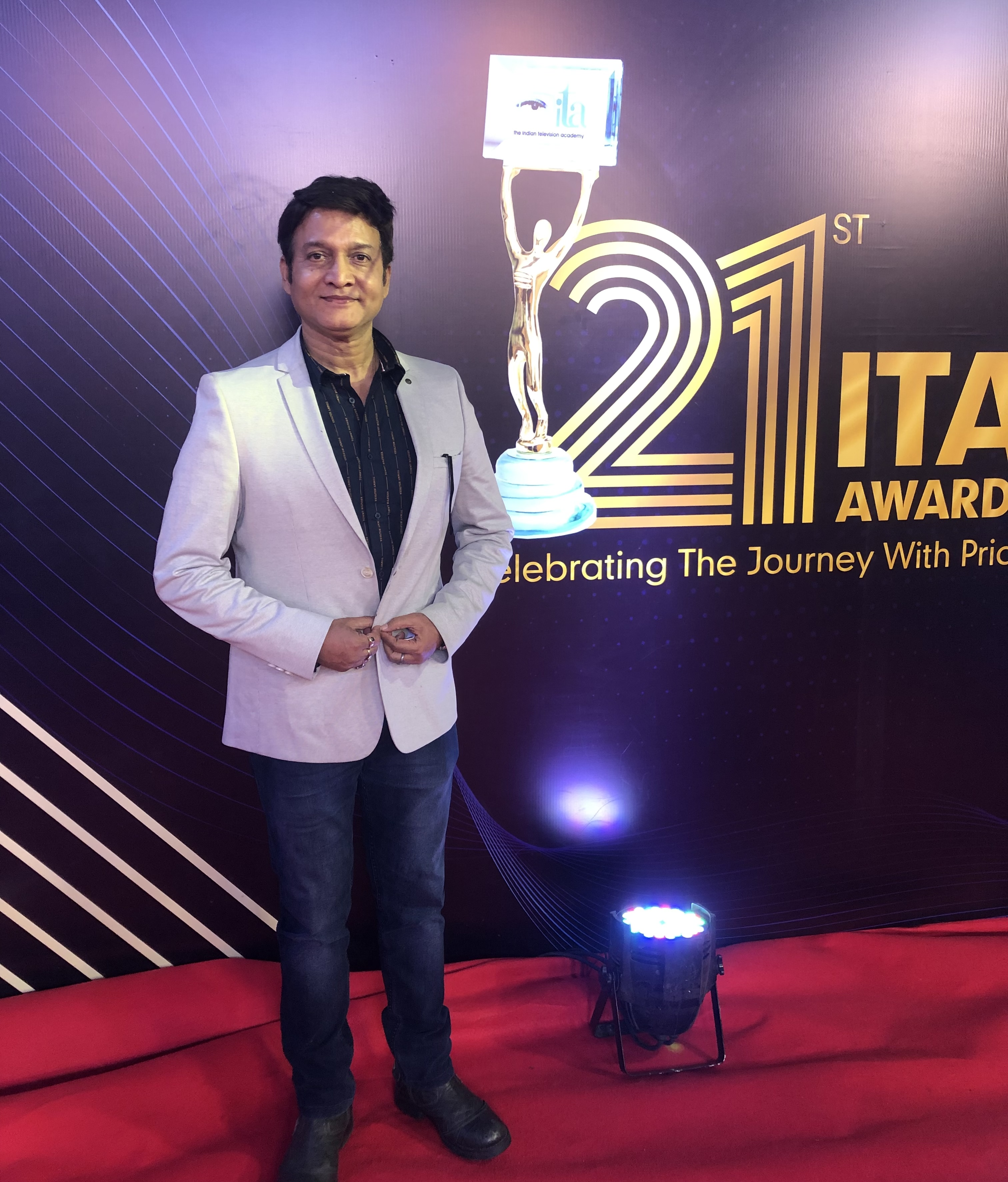
- Hemant Choudhary on the red carpet of 21st ITA AWARDS
- Born: Godda, Jharkhand, India
- Occupation: Actor
- Years active: 1996–present
- Known for: Jhansi Ki Rani; Veer Shivaji; Thapki Pyaar Ki; Siya Ke Ram; Border
- Height: 6 ft 0 in (1.83 m)

Hemant Choudhary is an Indian actor who appears in Hindi serials, films and web series.

== Early life and career ==
Hemant Choudhary was born in Godda, a small town in Jharkhand and brought up in Hazaribagh, Jharkhand. He completed his later education in Delhi. He moved to Mumbai in the 90s to pursue a career as an actor in the Entertainment Industry. In the late 90s he acted in movies such as Border and Return of Jewel Thief.

He is best known for his role of Raghunath Singh in Zee TV 's Jhansi Ki Rani. He made his debut on television in 2001 with Zee TV 's Gharana in which he played the character of Rahul Somani. He has also starred in shows such as Siya Ke Ram, Veer Shivaji, Thapki Pyar Ki, Main Maike Chali Jaungi Tum Dekhte Rahiyo, Namah Lakshmi Narayan, Saath Saath Banayenge Ek Aashiyaan, Kumkum and Ek Ghar Banaunga. He has appeared in films and web series such as Border, Azhar, Once Upon a Time in Mumbaai and Aashram - Season 3.

== Filmography ==
=== Films ===
Year	Film	Role	Notes
1996	Return of Jewel Thief	Inspector	
1997	Border	P.D. Somesh Uttam	IAF Officer
2002	Bharat Bhagya Vidhata	Terrorist	Antagonist
2005	71/2 Phere	TV Show Hero	Cameo
2006	Janani		
2010	Once Upon a Time in Mumbaai	Vijay	Film Star
2016	Azhar	Samar	Ad Film Director
2019	Blank	Doctor	
2023	OMG 2	Nagdev Sir	Biology Teacher
2023	Deceptive Diva	D.D.	ShemarooMe Film
2024	Chandu Champion	Brigadier at Secunderabad	
2024	Maharaj	Shraddhalu	Netflix Film
2024	Dhaaak	Inspector Chatur Waghmare	Antagonist
2025	Sarkari Baccha	Pandey Ji	

=== Television ===
Year	Title	Role	Channel	Notes
2001–2003	Gharana	Rahul Somani	Zee TV	Main Lead
2001	Kabhi To Milenge	Investigating Officer	Zee TV	
2003–2004	Kyunki Saas Bhi Kabhi Bahu Thi	Inspector Ashutosh	StarPlus	
2003–2006	Kumkum	Inspector Bhupendra Singh	StarPlus	
2004–2005	Hey...Yehii To Haii Woh!	Babu Kamath	Star One	Main Antagonist
2007–2008	Har Ghar Kuch Kehta Hai	Khan Chacha	Zee TV	
2007–2008	Ardhangini – Ek Khoobsurat Jeevan Saathi	Onir Bhattacharya	Zee TV	Priyam's Uncle
2008	Saath Saath Banayenge Ek Aashiyaan	Ranjeet Singh	Zee TV	Uday's Father
2009–2011	Jhansi Ki Rani	Raghunath Singh	Zee TV	Commander-In-Chief of Jhansi
2011–2012	Veer Shivaji	Shyamraj Nikant Pant	Colors TV	Prime Minister in the court of Shivaji
2013	Devon Ke Dev...Mahadev	Prajapati Vishwaroop	Life OK	Guest Appearance
2013	Mahabharat	Guru Kripacharya	StarPlus	
2013–2014	Buddha	Mahamantri Udyan	Zee TV	
2014	Ek Ghar Banaunga	Shashikant Garg	StarPlus	Akash's Father
2015	Bharat Ka Veer Putra – Maharana Pratap	Dondiya Thakur Sanda	Sony Entertainment Television	
2015–2016	Siya Ke Ram	Kushadhwaja	StarPlus	Sita's Uncle
2016	Kuch Rang Pyar Ke Aise Bhi	Dr Sinha	Sony Entertainment Television	Guest Appearance
2016–2017	Thapki Pyar Ki	Naman Jaiswal	Colors TV	Bihan's Uncle/Step Father
2017	Ek Aastha Aisi Bhee	Nandalal Agarwal	StarPlus	Shiv's Uncle
2018	Vighnaharta Ganesha	Prajapati Daksh	Sony Entertainment Television	Guest Appearance
2018	Paramavatar Shri Krishna	Lord Parashurama	&TV	Guest Appearance
2018–2019	Main Maike Chali Jaungi Tum Dekhte Rahiyo	Gauri Shankar Surana	Sony Entertainment Television	Samar's Father
2019	Namah Lakshmi Narayan	Lord Brahma	StarPlus	Also Narrator
2021	Kundali Bhagya	Yashvardhan Raichand	Zee TV	Sonakshi's Father
2022	Parineetii	Devraj Malhotra	Colors TV	
2024	Doree	Veerendra Singh	Colors TV	Colors TV
2024	Kumkum Bhagya	Amar Dayal	Zee TV	Jaiswal’s political Rival
2024-Present	Udne Ki Aasha	Joy Banerjee	StarPlus	Riya’s father, Paresh’s Rival
2025	Rishton se Bandhi Gauri	Kuldeep Pratap Singh Bundela	Sun Neo tv	Rudra, Virendra and Vijender's father

=== Web series ===
Year	Title	Role	Streaming Platform	Production House	Notes
2022	Aashram	I.G. Sumit Chauhan	MX Player	Prakash Jha Productions	Season 3
2023	Puraani Havveli Ka Rahasya	Mukesh Gupta	Alt Balaji		Main Lead
2023	Taali (TV series)	Sanjeev Mittal	JioCinema	GSEAMS Triple Ace Entertainments jio studio's	
2023	Bambai Meri Jaan	Nasir’s Father	Amazon Prime Video	Excel Entertainment	

=== Music video ===
Year	Album	Label	Singer	Notes
2023	Mere Bhole Nath	T-Series	Jubin Nautiyal	Main Protoganist
