= Pyaar Ka Bandhan =

- Genre: Drama
- Created by: Balaji Telefilms
- Screenplay by: Mrinal Jha; Vandana Tewari; Johana Mahrat; Dialogues; Rekkha Modi
- Directed by: Anil V Kumar; Partho Mitra; Rakesh Malhotra; Deepak Chavan; Mujammil Desai; Jafar Shaikh
- Creative director: Shivangi Chauhan Babbar
- Starring: See Below
- Country of origin: India
- Original language: Hindi
- No. of episodes: 108

Production
- Producers: Shobha Kapoor & Ekta Kapoor
- Cinematography: Mahesh Talkad, Dawood Ali & Ashish Sharma
- Editors: Vikas Sharma, Vishal Sharma, Rajeev Yadav & Raju Kori
- Running time: 24 minutes

Original release
- Network: Sony TV
- Release: 7 October 2009 – 28 April 2010

Pyaar Ka Bandhan (transl. The Bond of Love) is an Indian television series that aired on Sony TV, based on the story of four siblings who get separated by fate and their reunion. The series premiered on 7 October 2009 and was produced by Ekta Kapoor of Balaji Telefilms.

== Plot ==
The story is about four siblings - Kajol, Sujoy, Deva, and Mishti who are left in an orphanage by their mother Vijoya because she is dying of cancer.

=== 15 years later ===
The siblings have grown up.

The eldest son Deva, now named as Millind, works for a famous politician and aspires to be one himself. Millind also serves as the politician's daughter, Devika's, bodyguard.

Kajol, the eldest daughter, now named Prateeksha, becomes the personal secretary to Shashank, a good-hearted, carefree playboy. Prateeksha is still looking for her siblings. Shashank becomes engaged to Suhani who appoints Prateeksha believing Shashank would not flirt with her.

Suhani's step-sister is Araina, Prateeksha's younger sister Mishti, who was adopted by the wealthy Vikram Rai and raised as a spoilt brat. Aziz, previously Sujoy, was adopted by a Muslim couple and now works in Vikram Rai's house as their driver.

Gradually, Shashank changes under Prateeksha's influence, becomes responsible, and falls in love with her. Prateeksha reciprocates his feelings but sacrifices her love for Suhani's sake. Araina, meanwhile, falls in love with the Rais' horse rancher, Raunak.

Aziz finds out that Prateeksha is his older sister Kajol. Prateeksha accidentally overhears him talking to his adoptive mother and is relieved to have found one sibling. Suhani finds out about Shashank and Prateeksha's love and decides to tell everyone but she and Araina meet with an accident that kills Suhani and lands Araina in a coma.

=== 6 months later ===
Prateeksha is married and has moved to Delhi. Araina recovers from her coma. Prateeksha needs a signature from a minister, now Milind, to build an orphanage. Meanwhile, Devika announces that she will marry Milind. At a party, Araina and Shashank run into Prateeksha who avoids Shashank. Shashank follows her and tries to uncover the details of her married life. Eventually, Araina, Aziz and Shashank discover that Prateeksha is married to Raunak.

Araina decides to get revenge against Prateeksha blaming her for Suhani's death and for taking Raunak away from her. She takes over the company where Raunak works and starts creating problems in his personal and professional life. More deeply in love with Prateeksha, Shashank realises her marriage to Raunak is only for show and discovers a CD in her house but she throws him out. Later, Shashank's father warns Prateeksha to stay awa from him or he would expose the contents of the CD which prove that Suhani's accident was caused by Raunak's car. Prateeksha then leaves for Kolkata.

Aziz, Milind and Araina leave for Kolkata to find their biological mother who survived her illness. Eventually, Aziz, Milind and Prateeksha reconcile with their mother. Araina discovers the truth and drops her evil plans.

Prateeksha and Shashank, Milind and Radha, Araina and Raunak, Aziz and Devika get together, and the four siblings finally reunite.

== Cast ==
- Kritika Kamra as Kajol Das / Prateeksha
- Lavanya Tripathi as Mishti Das / Araina Rai
- Sumeet Sachdev as Raunak
- Vivan Bhatena as Shashank Malhotra
- Karan Sharma as Sujoy Das / Aziz
- Mahesh Shetty as Devashish "Deva" Das / Milind
- Megha Israni as Suhani Rai
- Salil Ankola as Vikam Rai, Suhani's father
- Kavita Kapoor as Sonia Rai, Suhani's mother

== Crossover ==
The show had a special one-hour crossover episode with another Balaji show Bayttaab Dil Kee Tamanna Hai on 24 December 2009 and 28 December 2009.
