= Laado (TV series) =

- Starring: Meghna Malik; Simran Kaur; Varun Kapoor; Vaishnavi Dhanraj; Natasha Sharma; Aditya Redij; Shikha Singh; Avika Gor; Shaleen Malhotra; Siddharth Arora; Vinny Arora; Palak Jain; Dakssh Ajit Singh Ahmad Harhash
- Opening theme: Na Aana Is Des Laado by Neha Kakkar (Season 1); Laado Badlegi Kaahani by Asees Kaur (Season 2)
- Country of origin: India
- Original language: Hindi
- No. of episodes: 870 (Season 1); 133 (Season 2); 1,003 (Total)

Production
- Producers: Shyamashis Bhattacharya (Season 1); Dhaval Gada (Season 2)
- Camera setup: Multi-camera
- Running time: 20 minutes
- Production companies: Shakuntalam Telefilms (Season 1); Pen Pictures (Season 2)

Original release
- Network: Colors TV
- Release: 9 March 2009 – 23 May 2018

Laado (English: Girl Daughter) is an Indian television soap opera finite series produced by Shakuntalam Telefilms (Season 1) and Dhaval Gada (Season 2). It aired on weekdays on Colors TV.

The show had two seasons titled Na Aana Is Des Laado (English: Never come to this country, dear) and Laado - Veerpur Ki Mardani (English: Daughter - Manlike of Veerpur).

The first season named Na Aana Is Des Laado premiered on 9 March 2009. It starred Meghna Malik, Simran Kaur, Vaishnavi Dhanraj and Yash Dasgupta. The season ended on 27 July 2012 after 870 episodes. It became one of the highest rated shows on Indian television at that time.

The second season named Laado 2 (TV series) premiered on 6 November 2017. It starred Meghna Malik, Avika Gor, Palak Jain and Shaleen Malhotra. The season ended on 23 May 2018 after 133 episodes, and was replaced by Bepannah.

== Plot ==
=== Season 1 (Na Aana Is Des, Laado) ===
The serial is about a conflict between an ignorant, manipulative and dominant woman, Ammaji (Meghna Malik) who rules a village called Veerpur with an iron fist and Sia (Natasha Sharma), an educated daughter of a doctor and a rebel against Ammaji's evil cultures. This show mainly focuses on Ammaji, her family and the evil custom of female infanticide and rampant misogyny prevalent in the backward village. The moral of the story is about women's rights. The show portrays various social evils practiced in India.

=== Season 2 (Laado - Veerpur Ki Mardani) ===
Ammaji is back! Living a retired life with her two granddaughters Anushka (Avika Gor) and Jhanvi (Palak Jain), her only aim in life is to protect her two granddaughters. But what will happen when a wrong move by her granddaughters take her back to where it all began, Veerpur?

== Cast ==
- Meghna Malik (seasons 1-2) as Bhagwani Devi Sangwan / Ammaji
- Simran Kaur (season 1) as Diya Raghav Sangwan née Diya Shaurya Pratap - Ammaji's granddaughter
- Vaishnavi Dhanraj (season 1) as Jhanvi Raghav Sangwan / Jhanvi Surya Rantej - Ammaji's granddaughter
- Yash Dasgupta (season 1) as Karan Vijay Chautala - Ammaji's step-grandson
- Shresth Kumar (season 1) as Aditya Gajendar Sangwan - Ammaji's grandson
- Neelam Bhagchandani / Rishina Kandhari (season 1) as Tanisha Karan Chautala - Karan's wife
- Avantika Shetty (season 1) as Ragini Aditya Sangwan - Aditya's wife
- Madhurjeet Sarghi (season 1) as Santosh Joginder Sangwan / Santosh Vijay Chautala - Ammaji's ex daughter in law
- Rinku Vohra (season 1) as Chanda Avtaar Sangwan - Avtaar's wife
- Aryan Pandit (season 1) as Rajbeer Avtaar Sangwan - Ammaji's grandson
- Nishant Shokeen (season 1) as Vijay Chautala - Santosh's second husband
- Kapil Nirmal (season 1) as Surya Rana Rantej Singh - Jhanvi's husband
- Winy Tripathi (season 1) as Inspector Vikram Singh - Diya's ex-fiancée
- Rakesh Sharma (season 1) as Yashpal - Ammaji's bodyguard
- Ankita Maheswari (season 1) as Sarah Vijay Chautala - Vijay's daughter, Santosh's step daughter
- Natasha Sharma (season 1) as Sia Raghav Sangwan
- Aditya Redij (season 1) as Raghav Sangwan - Ammaji's youngest son
- Shikha Singh (season 1) as Amba Sangwan - Ammaji's daughter, Jhanvi's adoptive mother
- Harish Verma (season 1) as Avtaar Dharamveer Sangwan - Ammaji's nephew
- Tarun Anand / Nissar Khan (season 1) as Joginder Sangwan - Ammaji's eldest son
- Shivangi Sharma (season 1) as Sunehri Gajendar Sangwan - Gajendar's wife
- Anand Goradia (season 1) as Gajendar Sangwan - Ammaji's second son
- Shaikha Parween (season 1) as Jhumar Dharamveer Sangwan / Jhumar Dheeraj Singh - Ammaji's niece
- Sonal Jha (season 1) as Sheela Dharamveer Sangwan - Ammaji's sister in law
- Kannan Arunachalam (season 1) as Dharamveer Sangwan - Ammaji's brother
- Aman Verma (season 1) as Bhanu Pratap Singh - Shaurya's father
- Varun Kapoor (season 1) as Shaurya Bhanu Pratap Singh - Diya's ex-husband
- Samiksha Bhatt (season 1) as Lovely Shaurya Pratap Singh - Shaurya's wife
- Shabana Mullani (season 1) as Bulbul Rana Rantej Singh - Rantej's second wife/mistress
- Sheeba Chaddha (season 1) as Bajri Pratap Singh - Bhanu's sister
- Sharmilee Raj (season 1) as Dharamveer's Mistress
- Menaka Lalwani (season 1) as Rangeeli Avtaar Sangwan - Avtaar's ex-wife
- Ayam Mehta (season 1) as Rana Rantej Singh - Surya's father
- Anil Lalwani (season 1) as Kuldeep Rana Rantej Singh - Surya's brother, Jhanvi's ex-husband
- Deepraj Rana (season 1) as DK Vora
- Pratik Mitra (season 1) as Chamkila Kuldeep Singh - Kuldeep's boyfriend
- Shobhit Attray (season 1) as Param Rana Rantej Singh - Surya's brother, Jhanvi's ex-husband
- Dhruv Lather (season 1) as Dheeraj Singh - Jhumar's husband
- Karmveer Choudhary (season 1) as Dev's Father
- Rahul Singh (season 1) as Satpal - Rantej's right-hand man
- Deeya Chopra (season 1) as Sonali - Raghav's ex-fiancée
- Janvi Sangwan (season 1) as Shivlaali Rana Rantej Singh - Rantej's first wife
- Deepak Sandhu (season 1) as Raj
- Lankesh Bhardwaj / Sanjay Bhardwaj (season 1) as Kishanlal
- Bhavin Wadia (season 1) as Shera - Amba's right-hand man
- Rocky Verma (season 1) as Contract Killer
- Shahab Khan (season 1) as Dr. Devi Singh - Sia's Father
- Reema Vohra (season 1) as Vaidhei Devi Singh - Sia's sister
- Suraj Jadhav (season 1) as Wrestler - one of the lead pehlewan
- Avika Gor (season 2) as Anushka Yuvraj Choudhary (née Sangwan) - Ammaji's elder granddaughter
- Shaleen Malhotra (season 2) as Yuvraj Singh Choudhary - Anushka's husband
- Siddharth Arora (season 2) as Shaurya - Juhi's lover
- Vinny Arora (season 2) as Juhi Sethi - Indra's molestation victim
- Rituraj Singh (season 2) as Balwant Singh Choudhary - Malhari's husband
- Zalak Desai (season 2) as Komal Dharam Kriplani (née Choudhary) - Yuvraj's younger sister
- Charu Asopa (season 2) as Kajal Kuldeep Sethi - Kuldeep's wife
- Palak Jain (season 2) as Jhanvi Sangwan - Anushka's younger sister
- Ankit Raaj (season 2) as Ranveer Balwant Choudhary - Rantej's younger brother
- Adhvik Mahajan (season 2) as Dr. Vishal - Meera's friend
- Farida Dadi (season 2) as Kavita Sethi - Juhi's paternal grandmother
- Ashu Sharma (season 2) as Amrish - Shagun's younger brother
- Arjun Aneja (season 2) as Kuldeep Sethi - Shagun's son
- Mamta Luthra / Unknown (season 2) as Taai - Juhi's nanny
- Unknown (season 2) as Bunty - Shaurya's friend
- Nasirr Khan (season 2) as Advocate Dharam Kriplani - Komal's husband
- Manini Mishra (season 2) as Shagun Sethi - Juhi's stepmother
- Ananya Khare (season 2) as Malhari Balwant Choudhary - Balwant's wife
- Nimai Bali (season 2) as Indra Baba - Malhari's second husband
- Dakssh Ajit Singh (season 2) as Rantej Balwant Choudhary - Balwant and Malhari's elder son
- Saii Ranade Sane (season 2) as Meera Rantej Choudhary - Rantej's wife
- Hemann Choudhary (season 2) as Tej Choudhary - Dushyant's son
- Moni Rai (season 2) as Dushyant Singh Choudhary - Balwant's younger brother
- Gulfam Khan (season 2) as Rajjo - Balwant's younger sister
- Simran Natekar (season 2) as Chunki - Dhumal's wife
- Paaras Madaan (season 2) as Jai Dev
- Kapil Soni (season 2) as Jai's Elder Brother
- Sudipti Parmar (season 2) as Jai's Elder Brother's Wife
- Prakash (season 2) as Dhumal - Saroj's son
- Meenal Kapoor (season 2) as Saroj - Ammaji's friend
- Ahmad Harhash Season 2 as Ram Chatturvedi Ammaji’s friend
