= Lado =

Lado or LADO may refer to:

== Places ==
- Lado Enclave of the Congo Free State, in modern South Sudan
- Lado, Burkina Faso, a town
- Lado, South Sudan, a town, formerly the seat of the Lado Enclave, and Equatoria province
- Mount Lado, South Sudan

== Surname ==
- Aldo Lado (1934–2023), Italian film and television director
- Annie Lado (born 2002), English badminton player
- Garba Yakubu Lado (born 1961), Nigerian politician and businessman
- Richard Justin Lado (born 1979), South Sudanese former footballer
- Robert Lado (1915–1995), American linguist

== Given name ==
- Lado Asatiani, Georgian writer
- Lado Chachanidze (born 2000), Georgian rugby union player in France
- Lado Chikhladze (born 1985), Georgian former tennis player
- Lado Davydov (1924–1987), Soviet soldier during the Second World War awarded the title Hero of the Soviet Union
- Lado Fumic (born 1976), German former cross-country mountain biker
- Lado Gudiashvili (1896–1980), Georgian painter
- Lado Gurgenidze (born 1970), Georgian banker, business executive, and former politician, sixth prime minister of Georgia
- Lado Ketskhoveli (1877–1903), Georgian writer and revolutionary
- Lado Kham (1901–1979), Slovenian architect
- Lado Kralj (1938–2022), Slovene writer, theatre critic and literary historian
- Lado Seidishvili (1931–2010), Georgian painter and poet

== Other uses ==
- Lado Guitars
- Language Analysis for the Determination of Origin
- Latin American Defense Organization, an American Latino advocacy organization
- National Folk Dance Ensemble of Croatia LADO
- The masculine counterpart of Lada, Slavic goddess of beauty

== See also ==
- Laado (TV series), India
  - Laado 2, its sequel
- Laado, a 2000 Indian film
- Ladoo (film), a 2018 Indian film
- Ladoo, an Indian sweet
- Lados, a commune in France
