= Tujko Hai Salaam Zindgi =

Indian television series

- Promotional logo
- Created by: Sphere Origins
- Directed by: Partho Mitra
- Creative director: Nimisha Pandey
- Starring: See below
- Opening theme: "Tujko Hai Salaam Zindgai" by
- Country of origin: India
- No. of seasons: 1
- No. of episodes: 56

Production
- Running time: approx. 22 minutes

Original release
- Network: Sony Entertainment Television India
- Release: 10 December 2007 – 13 March 2008

Tujhko Hai Salaam Zindagi (transl. Life Salute to You) is an Indian daily television series which premiered on 10 December 2007 on Sony TV. It takes the audience through the journey of Manya, an effervescent, energetic, and fun-filled girl. The series is produced by Sphere Origins.

== Plot ==
The show focuses on the life of the protagonist Manya, who has grown up with simple dreams...while at the moment she's just immersed herself in what her biggest passion - dance. The story takes a twist when Manya's biggest passion – dancing, clashes with the dreams of her grandfather, whose greatest loss was of his son who was a police inspector. Manya realizes her grandfather's dreams and leaves aside all her desires and firmly decides on becoming a successful police inspector. She makes a choice and faces all odds of the consequences of her actions.

To fulfill the dreams of her grandfather, Manya comes to the academy and is a complete underdog there. Her journey of gaining acceptance in the academy and ultimately going on to win the highest honour at the academy - the sword of honour and Manya finally becomes a cop, but her challenges are far from over...

In March 2008 three months into the show Sony cancelled the serial due to low TRPs (ratings).

== Cast ==
- Pariva Pranati as Manya Sharma
- Deepak Qazir / Madan Joshi as Havaldar Vaidji (Manya's grandfather)
- Anita Kulkarni as Meenakshi
- Gopi Desai as Nani
- Parth Muni as Montu
- Abhay Vakil as Akash
- Simple Kaul as Roopa
- Meghna Malik as Officer Jyotsna
- Sachin Khurana as Officer Khanna
- Manoj Bidwai as Karan (Manya's soon-to-be husband)
- Tapasvi Mehta as Vencell Mehta
