= Baal Shiv – Mahadev Ki Andekhi Gatha =

Indian mythological television series

- Also known as: Baal Shiv
- Genre: Mythological
- Created by: CL Saini
- Screenplay by: Brij Mohan Pandey
- Story by: Brij Mohan Pandey
- Directed by: Animesh Varma
- Starring: Aan Tiwari; Trisha Sarda; Shivya Pathania; Siddharth Arora; Mouli Ganguly
- Theme music composer: Jitesh Panchal
- Opening theme: Shiva...
- Country of origin: India
- Original language: Hindi
- No. of seasons: 1
- No. of episodes: 215

Production
- Producer: Anirudh Pathak
- Production location: Mumbai
- Editor: Madan Mohan Mishra
- Camera setup: Multi-camera
- Running time: 21-22 min approx.
- Production company: Zee Studios

Original release
- Network: And TV
- Release: 23 November 2021 – 19 September 2022

Baal Shiv – Mahadev Ki Andekhi Gatha is an Indian Hindi-language mythology series produced by Anirudh Pathak under the banner of Zee Studios. It was premiered on 23 November 2021 on And TV. It stars Aan Tiwari and Trisha Sarda in the lead roles of Baal Shiv and Baal Parvati. Siddharth Arora, Shivya Pathania and Mouli Ganguly appear in pivotal roles.

== Premise ==
The show revolves around Anasuya, the wife of the sage Atri and her motherhood as she transformed Shiva into a baby when the latter, along with Brahma and Vishnu had come to test her virtue and chastity.

== Cast ==
=== Main ===
- Siddharth Arora as Bhagwan Shiva
  - Aan Tiwari as Baal Shiv
- Shivya Pathania as Devi Parvati, Shakti, Adi Shakti, Katyayani, Durga, Mahakali, Kali, Tara, Tripura Sundari, Bhuvaneshwari, Bhairavi, Chhinnamasta, Dhumavati, Bagalamukhi, Matangi, Kamalatmika, Satakshi, Sati, Bhadrakali, 64 Yogini, Kaushiki, Chamunda
  - Trisha Sarda as Baal Parvati
- Mouli Ganguly as Mahasati Anasuya

=== Recurring ===
- Rajeev Bharadwaj / Sandeep Mohan as Maharishi Atri
- Sujay Reu as Vishnu
- Kapil Nirmal as Maharaj Tarakasur
- Dakssh Ajit Singh / Kunal Bakshi as Devraj Indra
- Shrashti Maheshwari as Rajkumari Ajamukhi
- Nazea Hasan Sayed as Devi Saraswati
- Vandana Rao / Deepika Upadhyay as Devi Lakshmi
- Praneet Bhat as Devrishi Narada
- Sunil Singh as Shukracharya
- Krip Suri as Andhaka
- Danish Akhtar Saifi as Nandi
- Akshaan Sehrawat as Child Bhagwan Vishnu
- Revansh Gulrajani as Child Brahmadev
- Naksh Patel as Child Devrishi Narada
- Tej Sapru as Maharaj Daksha
- Anjita Punia as Devi Shachi
- Shravani Goswami as Mahrani Prasuti
- Pallavi Pradhan as Maharani Mainavati
- Mukesh Tripathi as Maharishi Bhrigu
- Manish Kapoor as Yakshraj Kubera
- Aloknath Pathak as Vriddhbheel
- Rajeev Pawar as Varuna
- Manoj Kolhatkar as Maharishi Katyavana
- Vinit Kakar as Mayasura
- Niranjan Nalawade as Gajasura
- Ambika Soni as Daruka
- Rajesh Dubey as Maharishi Parashara
- Krishnakant Singh Bundela as Shamshan Rakshak
