= Mukti Bandhan =

- Genre: Drama
- Written by: Vipul Mehta; Mihir Bhuta
- Directed by: Vikram Ghai; Sangeet Kulkarni
- Starring: See below
- Country of origin: India
- Original language: Hindi
- No. of seasons: 1
- No. of episodes: 153

Production
- Producer: Shobhana Desai
- Cinematography: Sudesh Kotian
- Running time: Approx. 24 minutes
- Production company: Shobhna Desai Productions

Original release
- Network: Colors TV
- Release: 10 January – 29 September 2011

Mukti Bandhan (transl. Bond Redemption) is a television series from India, that has aired on Colors TV, based on the story of an ordinary man with an extraordinary sense for business. The story is an adaptation of Harkisan Mehta's novel Mukti Bandhan. The story was adapted by Vipul Mehta. Due to a high-class concept, this show could not get success with ratings, so it was shifted to 11 pm.

== Cast ==
Actor	Character
Shiv Kumar Subramaniam	Ishwarlal Motilal Virani
Esha Kansara	Devki Shah
Siddharth Arora	Vaibhav Virani
Surbhi Javeri Vyas	Charulata Virani
Raj Singh	Siddarth Virani
Yohana Vacchani / Hunar Hali	Nirali Virani
Utkarsh Majumdar	Motilal Virani
Meenal Patel	Kesarba Virani
Ekta Saraiya	Rajvi Siddharth Virani
Deepti Naval	Chandraprabha Shah/Parimeeta
Ramesh Talwar	Bhavanji Bha
Nazneen Patel	Sabeena Qureshi
Rishi Sharma	Rishi
Winy Tripathi	Viraj
Sumit Vats / Rahil Azam	Jimmy
Hiten Tejwani	Vicky Oberoi
Rajeev Mehta	Dalichand
Nilesh Pandya	Praveen Kaka

== Awards ==
Year	Award	Category
2011	Indian Television Academy Awards	Best Actor in a Negative Role Shiv Kumar Subramaniam As Ishwarlal Virani (I.M Virani)
2011	Indian Television Academy Awards	Best Art Direction Akshay Vayeda (Crew)
2011	Indian Television Academy Awards	Best Dialogues Mihir Bhuta (Crew)
