= Ek Safar Aisa Kabhi Socha Na Tha =

- Written by: Virendra Shahaney
- Directed by: Pawan Kumar
- Starring: see below
- Opening theme: "Ek Safar Aisa Kabhi Socha Na Tha"
- Country of origin: India
- No. of episodes: 60

Production
- Producer: Rashmi Sharma
- Running time: approximately 23 minutes

Original release
- Network: Sony Entertainment Television
- Release: 9 February – 21 May 2009

Ek Safar Aisa Kabhi Socha Na Tha is a Hindi-language television series on Sony Entertainment Television. It premiered on 9 February 2009. The series was produced by Rashmi Sharma of Rashmi Sharma Telefilms Limited, and the story is written by Virendra Shahaney.

== Cast ==
- Jayshree Soni as Ganga
- Maninder Singh as Manav Rathore
- Pankaj Dheer as Mr. Rathore (Manav's father)
- Tapasvi Mehta as Golu (Ganga's Brother)
- Madhavi Gogate as Mrs. Rathore (Manav's mother)
- Kuldeep Malik as Vikram Rathore (Manav's chacha/uncle)
- Neelu Kohli as Rohini Rathore (Manav's chachi/aunt)
- Rinku Ghosh as Maya Rathore (Manav's elder sister)
- Guddi Maruti as Nanhi Bua (Ganga's aunt)
