= Anjali Abrol =

Indian television actress

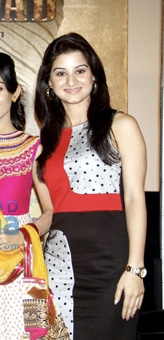
- Anjali Abrol at the audio release of Singh Saab The Great
- Born: Jammu, India
- Occupation: Actress
- Years active: 2008–2019
- Known for: Raja Ki Aayegi Baraat

Anjali Abrol is an Indian actress best known for her role in the Indian television series Raja Ki Aayegi Baraat. Anjali participated in Nach Baliye 4 with Kapil Nirmal in 2008. She made a debut in Bollywood with Singh Saab the Great in 2013.

== Career ==
Anjali grabbed her first role at the age of 15 in a 2008 Star Plus series Raja Ki Aayegi Baraat. In 2023, Anjali made her Bollywood debut in Singh Saab the Great, starring Sunny Deol, where she portrayed the protagonist’s sister. She later signed another film in which she plays the lead role.

== Television ==
Year	Serial	Role	Notes	References
2008–2010	Raja Ke Aayegi Baraat	Rani Yudhishthir Sidodia	Lead role	
2008–2009	Nach Baliye 4	Contestant	Along with Kapil Nirmal	
2008	Karam Apnaa Apnaa	Guest (as Rani)	Special appearance	
2008	Kumkum – Ek Pyara Sa Bandhan	Guest (as Rani)	Special appearance	
2008	Kasturi	Guest (as Rani)	Special appearance	
2008	Sapna Babul Ka... Bidaai	Guest (as Rani)	Special appearance	
2009	Yeh Rishta Kya Kehlata Hai	Guest (as Rani)	Special appearance	
2009	Kis Desh Mein Hai Meraa Dil	Guest (as Rani)	Special appearance	
2010	Sajan Ghar Jaana Hai	Guest (as Rani)	Special appearance	
2010	Saath Nibhaana Saathiya	Guest (as Rani)	Special appearance	
2011	Chhajje Chhajje Ka Pyaar	Dimpy Sehgal / Dimpy Dhruv Tripathi	Supporting Role	
2012–2013	Devon Ke Dev...Mahadev	Meenakshi	Supporting Role	
2013	Fear Files: Darr Ki Sacchi Tasvirein	Episode 75	Episodic Role	
2013	Fear Files: Darr Ki Sacchi Tasvirein	Episode 118	Episodic Role	
2013; 2014	The Adventures of Hatim	Queen Khwaish	Cameo Role	
2014–2016	Savdhaan India	Aditi Mishra (Episode 556)	Episodic Role	
2014–2016	Savdhaan India	Maya (Episode 736)	Episodic Role	
2014–2016	Savdhaan India	Piya (Episode 946)	Episodic Role	
2014–2016	Savdhaan India	Janvi (Episode 1127)	Episodic Role	
2014–2016	Savdhaan India	Keerti (Episode 1185)	Episodic Role	
2014–2016	Savdhaan India	Dr. Vasudha (Episode 1281)	Episodic Role	
2014–2016	Savdhaan India	Nivedita (Episode 1354)	Episodic Role	
2014–2016	Savdhaan India	Shikha (Episode 1463)	Episodic Role	
2015	Halla Bol	Neena (Season 2 – Episode 7)	Episodic Role	
2015	Badii Devrani	Siddhi Mehta	Negative Role	
2016	Box Cricket League 2	Contestant	Player in Mumbai Tigers	
2018	C.I.D. – Woh Kaun Tha	Anjali (Episode 1486)	Episodic Role	
2018	Kaun Hai? – The Horror Of The Jinn: Part 1 & Part 2	Aamna Episode (Episode 4 & Episode 5)	Episodic Role	
2018	Kaal Bhairav Rahasya Season 2	Lali	Negative Role	

== Filmography ==
Year	Film	Role	Notes
2013	Singh Saab the Great	Simar	
2019	Junction Varanasi	Anjali	
