= Mannat Singh =

Indian actress (born 1981)

- Born: 24 December 1981 (age 44); Amritsar, Punjab, India
- Occupation: Actress
- Years active: 2000–present
- Spouse: Dakssh Ajit Singh

Mannat Singh (born 24 December 1981), also known as Sukhi Pawar, is an Indian actress, known for her work in Punjabi movies. She is mostly known for her performance in the Punjabi movie named Arsho, released in 2015. In 2017 she won the best supporting actress award in PTC Punjabi Awards for her performance in the movie Main Teri Tu Mera. Mannat Singh also sung a duet called "Jaa".

== Films ==
- Main Teri Tu Mera (2016)
- Vaisakhi List (2016)
- I Love Desi (2015)
- Arsho (2014)
- Tere Ishq Nachaya (2010)
- Band Vaaje (2019)
- Dil Hona Chahida Jawan (2023)
