= Singh Saab the Great =

2013 Indian film by Anil Sharma

- Theatrical release poster
- Directed by: Anil Sharma
- Written by: Shaktimaan Talwar
- Produced by: Anuj Sharma; Sangeeta Ahir
- Starring: Sunny Deol; Amrita Rao; Urvashi Rautela; Prakash Raj
- Cinematography: S. Gopinath
- Edited by: Ashfaque Makrani
- Music by: Anand Raj Anand; Sonu Nigam
- Production companies: Pen Studios; Mangalmurti Films
- Distributed by: Eros International
- Release date: 22 November 2013
- Running time: 150 minutes
- Country: India
- Language: Hindi
- Budget: ₹25 crore
- Box office: ₹40.67 crore

Singh Saab the Great (Note: The film was originally titled Singh Sahib/Sahab the Great, but objections were raised by the Akal Takht, the highest Sikh religious body over the use of the term sahib - an honorific in the religion. The title was changed to use "saab", a hypocorism of sahib.) is a 2013 Indian Hindi-language action drama film directed by Anil Sharma. The film stars Sunny Deol, Amrita Rao, Urvashi Rautela and Prakash Raj as main characters. The film marks the return of Sunny Deol to the action genre after a long time. Also, Deol and Sharma paired up once again after Gadar: Ek Prem Katha. The film narrates the story of a ex-collector who decides to teach a lesson to the man, who was responsible for his wife's death, by reforming him. The film's story and screenplay have been written by Shaktimaan Talwar, and the action sequences have been directed by Tinu Verna and Kanal Kannan. The music has been provided by Anand Raj Anand and Sonu Nigam. Amisha Patel was supposed to play the lead role but backed out due to ever-changing schedules.

The film also notably competed at the 2014 Pyongyang International Film Festival in North Korea in the main Best Film category. Despite the positive reviews, the movie bombed at box office

== Plot ==
An honest IAS officer gets a posting as a Collector in a small city. A TV journalist, Shikha Chaturvedi, uncovers the mysterious hero's backstory. It starts in a small village named Chironji, with a small argument about food issues in a village caused by a local goon named Jatta Singh (Shahbaz Khan) when Singh Saab (Sunny Deol) makes his grand entry. Singh Saab is an honest, noble, and loyal man. Above all else, he lives his life on honest principles, and that makes him a messiah of common people. He came with an offer from his movement named People's Beat, which is for a noble cause, and approached Jatta Singh to let the goods from his factories be used for a good cause. This enrages Jatta Singh and attacks Singh Saab. He denies hitting back to honor the day, which was 2 October, Non-Violence Day. But things got messy, and Singh Saab and Jatta have a duel.

Then they get several invitations, one from Bhadhori, which upsets him, and a TV reporter named Shikha Chuturvadi (Amrita Rao) approached to him and believes that he is living a noble life as a hoax. Then he was shaken and decided to tell her about the story of his life revolving around the name Bhadhori. It flashes back to 7 years earlier, the time when he was known as Saranjeet Singh Talwar, an IAS officer. He was travelling with his loving wife Minnie (Urvashi Rautela) to a small city, Bhadhori, where he was transferred as the Collector. There he starts a court of justice for action to be taken against corrupt individuals.

There he meets a gangster alias a crime lord named Raja Dadta Bhudhev Singh (Prakash Raj). He has an excise of Rupees 32,38,13,000 to pay, and he threatens Saranjeet to open his factories otherwise he will do something to his sister and ruin her marriage. This enrages Saranjeet, and he then slaps Bhudhev, which led to a threat to ruin Saranjeet's life and will make him squeal. Things get messy when Bhudhev kidnaps Saranjeet's sister's father-in-law and makes him to obey his order to mix poison in the ritual of feeding sweets to the daughter-in-law and son, or the whole family will be poisoned. He tries but attempts to fail and Saranjeet finds that things are fishy. He is called by Bhudhev and finds out that Minnie was poisoned, by the cause of her drink being spiked with poison.

They rush her to the hospital and Bhudhev has made a deal to exchange the order of his factories' release for Dr. Anand, the neurosurgeon, to perform the surgery for Minnie's survival. Saranjeet agrees for Minnie's unstable condition. But, it gets too late and Minnie passes away. Saranjeet is heartbroken and had found an old letter written by his wife during her last minutes. Furious, Saranjeet goes to Bhudev and attacks him. He is then dismissed from government service and sentenced for 16 years of imprisonment.

Later on, Saranjeet meets his old friend, Mohammad Iqbal (Rajit Kapur) who was the jailor official, and recommended bringing change instead of taking revenge. Now in present day, he is a man dedicated to bringing change in society. Singh Saab defeats Bhudev and his men, who abducted Simar and her son. He rescued her from falling off through the bamboo, thus teaching Bhudev Singh a lesson and leaves Bhadori to live a happy life.

== Cast ==
- Sunny Deol as Saranjit Singh Talwar, IAS / Sunny / "Singh Saab"
- Amrita Rao as Shikha Chaturvedi – Journalist
- Urvashi Rautela as Minnie Talwar – Saranjit's wife
- Prakash Raj as Bhoodev Singh
- Anjali Abrol as Simar / Guddie – Saranjit's sister
- Rajit Kapur as Jailer Mohammad Iqbal
- Sanjay Mishra as Murli
- Yashpal Sharma as Lallan Singh – Bhoodev's man
- Manoj Pahwa as Govardhan – Bhoodev's man
- Johny Lever as Gulwinder /Gullu
- Shahbaz Khan as Jatta Singh (Special Appearance)
- Amit Behl as Vasiyat
- Raj Premi as Sultan – Bhoodev's henchmen
- Alan Kapoor as Ashwini
- Anukool Jain as Press Reporter
- Simran Khan as Dancer – In the song "Khaike Palang Todh Pan"
- Satyavrat Mudgal as Rampal
- Dharmendra (cameo appearance) – In the song "Daaru Band Kal Se"
- Bobby Deol (cameo appearance) – In the song "Daaru Band Kal Se"

== Music and soundtrack ==
The music of the film was composed by Anand Raj Anand, except for the song "Singh Saab The Great", whose music was composed by Sonu Nigam. The lyrics of the songs were penned by Sameer and Kumaar. The music was launched on 28 Oct 2013. The album contains six songs.

Track #	Title	Composer	Singer(s)
1	"Singh Saab The Great"	Sonu Nigam	Sonu Nigam, Teesha Nigam
2	"Daaru Band Kal Se"	Anand Raj Anand	Sonu Nigam
3	"Palang Todh"	Anand Raj Anand	Sunidhi Chauhan, Anand Raj Anand
4	"Jab Mehndi Lag Lag Jaave"	Anand Raj Anand	Sonu Nigam, Shreya Ghoshal
5	"Daaru Band Kal Se (Remix)"	Anand Raj Anand	Sonu Nigam
6	"Heer"	Anand Raj Anand	Sonu Nigam

== Reception ==
Singh Saab The Great received mostly positive reviews from critics. David Chute of Variety praised Deol's action sequences.

NDTV rated the movie as 3.5/5 stars, saying, "There is a virility and fluency to the storytelling. Singh Saab The Great is a homage to the cinema of the 1980s when Sunny was macho." Filmfare gave the film 4/5 stars, saying "SSTG is a mass entertainer. It's a Sunny Deol vehicle. Sunny Paaji is obviously on top of this game. His comedy punches, stirring Punjabi dialogues are all over the top but perfectly suitable in context of film".

The Times of India gave the movie 3/5 stars, stating "Like all films that talk of reforming society, Anil Sharma's Singh Saab the Great has its heart in the correct place. Sunny Deol's earnestness shines, throughout the duration of this melodrama". Taran Adarsh of Bollywood Hungama gave a 3.5/5-star rating and wrote "Singh Saab the Great is a typical Sunny Deol film that a section of the audience still enjoys. The clap worthy dialogue, the raw appeal, the undercurrent of emotions and of course, the Dhaai kilo ka haath should appeal to those who relish desi fares, especially the single screen audience".

=== Box office ===
The film's total box office collections was approximately ₹40.67 crore

== See also ==
- List of Bollywood films of 2013
