= Durgesh Nandinii =

- A promotional logo image of "Durgesh Nandinii".
- Created by: Shobhana Desai
- Based on: Durgeshnandini by Bankim Chandra Chattopadhyay
- Directed by: Arvind Babbal
- Starring: see below
- Opening theme: "Durgesh Nandinii"
- Country of origin: India
- No. of seasons: 1
- No. of episodes: 157

Production
- Running time: approx. 22 minutes

Original release
- Network: SET India
- Release: 5 February – 15 November 2007

Durgesh Nandinii is an Indian television series that aired on Sony TV, which is loosely based on Bankim Chandra Chatterjee's novel Durgeshnandini, the first Bengali romance and the first ever novel in Bengali that was published in 1865.

== Plot ==
The story of Durgesh Nandinii represent two sides of Indian life – the modern, rich life on one side and the rural countryside life on the other. The story of this serial takes off when the millionaire industrialist Dharamadas Shrivstava dies and makes an unknowledgeable, parentless girl name Durgesh Nandinii, who lives a small countryside village (Lalgunj) the entire trustee of his property/business. After hearing the news that the father has given his entire business fortune to some stranger, the two sons and a daughter gets completely shocked. The whole family is greatly annoyed as Durgesh arrives in their bungalow with her family and cattle and sets up her own little village within their beautiful rich house. From hereon the story takes off.

== Cast ==
- Rinku Ghosh as Durgesh Nandinii
- Gurpreet Singh as Sikandar
- Amit Sadh / Ankur Nayyar as Kshitij
- Utkarsha Naik as Durgesh Nandinii's Paternal Aunt
- Nishant Shokeen
- Harshal Gaglani
- Mohit Malik as Sikander
- Amrapali Gupta as Sugandhi
- Deepak Qazir as Dharamdas Khanna
- Nayan Bhatt as Pratibha Dharamdas Khanna
- Rajesh Kumar as Dheeraj Khanna
- Tasneem Sheikh as Dheeraj's wife
- Vishal Puri as Kishan Khanna
- Manini Mishra as Kishan's wife
- Mihir Mishra as Pawan Khanna
- Gurdeep Kohli as Pawan's wife
- Anupam Bhattacharya as Naren Khanna
- Sonia Kapoor as Kiran Naren Khanna
- Prakash Ramchandani as Gulati
- Raj Arjun as Chandu
