= Jayshree Soni =

Indian actress

Jay Shree Soni
- Born: Jaipur, Rajasthan
- Education: Rajasthan University
- Occupation: Actress
- Years active: 2008–2023

Jayshree Soni is an Indian actress who appears in Hindi TV serials, comedy shows and movies. She began her acting career in the Pogo sitcom Sunaina in 2008. She subsequently appeared in Ek Safar Aisa Kabhi Socha Na Tha, Agnipareeksha Jeevan Ki – Gangaa (2010). and Rishton Ke Bhanwar Mein Uljhi Niyati (2011).

Jayshree made her Bollywood debut with Sunaina.

== Television ==
Year	Shows	Roles
2008	Sunaina	Ritika Bhattacharya
2009	Ek Safar Aisa Kabhi Socha Na Tha	Ganga
2010	Agnipareeksha Jeevan Ki – Gangaa	Ganga
2011–2013	Rishton Ke Bhanwar Mein Uljhi Niyati	Niyati Sharma Shastri
2013	Adaalat – Qatil Patrakar: Part 1 & Part 2	Sanjana Saurav Acharya (Episode 241 & Episode 242)
	Fear Files	Ishita
	Savdhaan India	Sudha
	Amita Ka Amit	Kajri
	Chidiya Ghar	Machhli Mukherjee
2015–2016	Chalti Ka Naam Gaadi...Let's Go	Preeti Ahuja Chopra
	Y.A.R.O Ka Tashan	Dolly
	Deewane Anjane	RJ Suman
