= Rishika Mihani =

Indian television actress (born 1987)

- Born: Rishika Mihani; 8 June 1987 (age 38); Ahmedabad, Gujarat, India
- Occupation: Actress
- Years active: 2010–present
- Height: 5 ft 6 in (1.68 m)
- Partner: Ameya Malandkar
- Parent: Omprakash Mihani (father)
- Relatives: Muskaan Mihani (sister); Vishal Mihani (brother)

Rishika Mihani (born 8 June 1987) is an Indian television actress. She made her debut with Raja Ki Aayegi Baraat. She has done episodics for Adaalat, C.I.D., Aahat and Savdhaan India @ 11.

Rishika Mihani has a sister Muskaan Mihani, who is also a television actress.

== Career ==
Rishika Mihani started her career with the role of Ira (Mohini) in Raja Ki Aayegi Baraat on Star Plus. After that, she played the role of Komal in Beend Banoongaa Ghodi Chadhunga . She was last seen in Love Marriage Ya Arranged Marriage as Shivani.

== Television ==
TV Shows
| Year(s) | Title | Role | Ref(s) |
|---|---|---|---|
| 2017–2018 | Ishqbaaaz | Monali Veer Pratap Chauhan | |
| 2017 | Iss Pyaar Ko Kya Naam Doon 3 | Pooja | |
| 2017 | Ichhapyaari Naagin | Vishpreet | |
| 2015-2017 | Kalash (2015 TV series) | Ananya | |
| 2015 | Tum Aise Hi Rehna | Anushka Kapoor | |
| 2014-2015 | Box Cricket League | herself | |
| 2014-2015 | Hamari Sister Didi | Dimple Khanna | |
| 2011-12 | Beend Banoongaa Ghodi Chadhunga | Komal | |
| 2012 | Adaalat | Rashi | |
| 2012 | C.I.D. | Cameo | |
| 2012 | Love Marriage Ya Arranged Marriage | Shivani Prakash | |
| 2008 | Raja Ki Aayegi Baraat | Ira (Mohini) | |
