= Tapasvi Mehta =

Indian television actor (born 1993)

- Born: 17 January 1993 (age 33); Mumbai, Maharashtra, India
- Occupations: Actor; Cinematographer; Singer
- Years active: 2006–2013
- Spouse: Palak Jain (m. 2019)

Tapasvi Mehta (born 17 January 1993) is an Indian actor, director and cinematographer. As an actor he is known for teen sitcom Ishaan: Sapno Ko Awaaz De.

== Career ==
Mehta started his acting career at the age of 12 with an "Essel World" commercial. Later that year he did a mythological TV series for Zee TV called Raavan. He was seen in the Disney Channel India show, Ishaan: Sapno Ko Awaaz De. He played the role of main character, Ishaan. He was also nominated for the best actor award 4 times for it. His most recent role is as Rocky Singh Ahluwalia in the Sony TV drama, Parvarrish – Kuchh Khattee Kuchh Meethi. He is currently working on a short film called Bubblegum which also stars Rohan Shah and Kishan Savjani along with him. Till date, he has done about 15 TV shows including Mahima Shani Dev Ki, Tujko Hai Salaam Zindgi, Ek Safar Aisa Kabhi Socha Na Tha, Gumrah and many more. He was also recently seen in the Red Label Tea advertisement. Tapasvi is now waiting for his feature film to release in which he plays the younger version of the lead protagonist.

== Television ==
Year	Serial	Role
2005–2006	Raavan	Raavan
2007	Tujko Hai Salaam Zindgi	Hero
2008	Ek Safar Aisa Kabhi Socha Na Tha	Golu
2008	Mahima Shani Dev Ki	Shani
2009–2011	Ishaan: Sapno Ko Awaaz De	Ishaan
2011–2013	Parvarrish – Kuchh Khattee Kuchh Meethi	Rakvinder "Rocky" Singh Ahluwalia
