= Junoon – Aisi Nafrat Toh Kaisa Ishq =

Indian drama television series

- Title Card
- Created by: Beyond Dreams Production
- Written by: Jayesh D. Patil; Abhijit Sinha; Mukul Shrivastav sharad tripathi
- Directed by: Santram Varma, Yash Chauhan, Noel Smith
- Starring: Aditya Redij; Mouni Roy; Sara Khan
- Country of origin: India
- Original language: Hindi
- No. of seasons: 01
- No. of episodes: 216

Production
- Producers: Yash Patnaik; Mamta Yash Patnaik
- Cinematography: Santosh Suryavanshi
- Running time: 30 minutes

Original release
- Network: Life OK
- Release: 5 November 2012 – 6 September 2013

Junoon – Aisi Nafrat Toh Kaisa Ishq is a soap opera that was first shown between 5 November 2012 and 6 September 2013 on Life OK on Monday to Friday evenings. The show stars Aditya Redij and Mouni Roy in lead roles. The story revolves around the love-hate relationship between Prithvi and Meera.

== Plot summary ==
20 years ago, Meera's mother ran away from her husband's house as her husband, Meera's father, had her marry Prithvi, an orphan found on the steps of a temple. To escape this, Meera and her mother settled in Delhi and got her engaged again to a man named Akash. And to hide the secret Data tells all his villagers of Hardoi that his wife and daughter died in front of his very eyes in a river. In Delhi, Meera finds out that her Bittu has cancer and she needs all the love she can get. Meera and Akash don't know about what happened 20 years ago and they want to fulfill every last wish of their mother.

On the day of Karva Chauth, Sudha secretly does the ritual by giving a call to her husband. Akash sees this and is stunned. She tells him of her last wish that the full family stays together. Meera hears this and promises that she will not marry Akash till she fulfills her mother's last wish. She reaches Hardoi and is saved from a dangerous bull by her father, who she does not recognize. To travel to Ramdhari's house, she meets Prithvi who drops her to Ramdhari's Haveli. There she meets Lakhan and Kalki.

She goes through many problems as Ramdhari's lie had put a blindfold on all the people of Hardoi - even Prithvi. She brings her license to prove it, but Lakhan says that it is fake and that he can make a billion copies like that, hence burns it to ashes. Lakhan tries to ill-treat Meera by giving her to his men, but Jeevanlal informs Prithvi just in time. Prithvi saves her and she gives him a hug. He feels awkward. He finds out the reason behind her coming to the village and becomes her enemy. They both become enemies. Lakhan orders his men to kidnap Meera and kill her, but while escaping, Meera dashes into Ramdhari once again. Prithvi also reaches there.

Though Ramdhari knows Meera is his daughter, he lies to her to save his self-respect and appoints Prithvi to take care of her and keep her safe. They keep having small petty fights and Meera begins to call Prithvi Rambo Singh - Because of his extraordinary shape, height and attitude. Meera also meets panditji, the owner of a temple. He also knows that Meera is Ramdhari's daughter as during the escape, Meera had hurt her foot and the mark is still there.

Meera tries to find the truth but fails. Data assigns Prithvi with certain duties. He had to keep cows at his home while crops grow on the fields nearby and the cow shed is built. Prithvi has to go for some other work and so leaves Jeevanlal to make sure the cows remain in his house. While then Jeevanlal gives some information to Meera that Prithvi is an orphan and all answers to all questions come from the panchayat.

Hence Meera tells Jeevanlal to go and eat so that she can send the cows and ruin the crops. Lakhan, Kalki, Prithvi and all other villagers reach the fields just in time. Lakhan had always been jealous of Prithvi because Data finds him more responsible and assigns all duties to him. Lakhan puts the blame on Prithvi. Prithvi sees Jeevanlal and calls him angrily and questions him how all of that happened. He learns that Meera did it. Prithvi drags Meera to the Panchayati Raj to punish her. While this Prithvi mentions to Meera that, the mother of such a girl has to be a poisonous snake. Meera answers Prithvi by saying that no one knows who is his mother and was left orphan on the steps of temple. He is born as a sin of his mother.

This hurts Prithvi so badly that he leaves the Panchayat area. Lakhan enjoys the scene. While then the Panchayat decides to punish her by sending her to the Haveli in the form of a maid. Kalki accepts this as she is the Thakurain. Meera also accepts this punishment as she feels she will get all her answers from the Haveli. One day Kalki orders Meera to clean the full house. She decides to go to Ramdhari's room first. With the help of another maid she enters Ramdhari's house and is shocked to see a picture of her mother mounted on the wall with a garland hung on it. In anger she throws it on the ground. Ramdhari returns from his work and questions everyone how she reached the Haveli.

Lakhan tells him about the Panchayat's decision and also tells him what Meera said to Prithvi and said he thoroughly agrees with Meera and on top of that speaks bad about Prithvi. Ramdhari slaps Lakhan. Data also forbid Meera to enter his room. While then Prithvi removes all his anger by cutting logs of wood. He also ploughs the field causing painful sun burns on his shoulders. Jeevanlal comes to comfort him but Prithvi breaks the friendship between them. Prithvi also questions the Panditji what his father's name is and is full of grief. Meera later realizes what she said was very wrong and did not know that such a strong man would have such a fragile heart. Later in the show, a man does come in search of him exclaiming that Prithvi is his son.

She tries to apologize to him but he does not forgive Meera. A Shradh Pooja of Sudha was being conducted in the Haveli and Meera tries to stop it. She puts lemon in the milk. Prithvi was made in-charge of the Pooja hence was blamed for all the mishaps caused by Meera. For the past twenty years Ramdhari had never sat in the Shradh Pooja. He had always given an excuse. This time he decided to sit, but it all went hap hazard.

From the terrace a rat fell straight into the bowl of milk kept in front of the priest performing the pooja. They all stood up in shock and declared the Pooja unlucky and left without saying anything. Meera went to the balcony and was proud and happy that she had stopped the pooja. Prithvi came from behind, gave her a push and almost sent her off the parapet, but held her hand. He dropped her and caught her thrice. She told him that if he kills her what answer would he give his Data? After hearing this, Prithvi brought her back but she fell into his arms.

A few days later Prithvi tells Meera that Data is waiting for his wife and daughter. Meera, In happiness goes to the Haveli thinking that he has accepted her as her daughter. He stands at the entrance of his house with his arms open. Meera was about to run into his arms when another girl named Sunheri hugs him. She turns out to be Data's daughter. Another lady, Prabha, who turns about to be Data's second wife also comes. Meera just stands there in shock and feels betrayed. Prabha was the one who had taken care of Prithvi since he was a child. A few days later, Kalki gets a feeling that Meera is really Sudha's daughter.

She sees Meera talking to the hospital where her mother was getting cured. As soon as Meera goes from there, Kalki jots down the number and address of City Hospital and sends Lakhan there. Lakhan reaches, points a gun to a nurse and kicks her too. He then gets a straight whack from a lady who turns out to be Sudha. Lakhan doesn't reply just stands there in shock. He leaves from there and tells Kalki what the truth is. Kalki performs emotional drama in front of Meera calling her Miu, her childhood name and calling her mother Sudha "Behenji". She tells Meera that a few days later a ceremony will be held for Data by the people of Hardoi to show their respect for him. In this ceremony a video is prepared for Ramdhari.

In this video, the achievements of Ramdhari were shown. Suddenly, a video of Sudha and Meera was played. Meera sat there in shock. She wondered how her video reached the village. Prithvi tells the people that they are so stupid that they are pointing fingers at the person who had managed the lives of the people. Prithvi says the reason for all this error was Meera. He throws her in front of him. She tells Prithvi that she is not responsible for any of this and that Prithvi had no other choice but to believe her. Prithvi was about to continue the argument but the villager said that it is not the question about who did this, the question is – Is Sudha Alive? Data agrees.

Data finally accepts Meera as his daughter. In shame and shock Prithvi stood there. The Panchs said that Data had told a lie. He would have to give up his Sarpanch Ki Pagdi. He agreed and was about to leave with Meera to Delhi but was stopped by the members of the Panchayati Raj System. They said he was forbidden to go out of the village till his punishment term got over. Meera pleaded them by saying whatever her mother did not do she will fulfill it. The next day Prithvi dragged Meera to a new room from the loft room as told by Prabha. Lakhan got angry and asked Prithvi what he was doing. They got physical but were stopped by Data. Prabha came and told Data that she told Prithvi to give a new room to Meera as she was the daughter of the house.

The next day Sarpanch came and told Data to give up his role of being a Sarpanch. He was about to give the Pagdi but was stopped by his daughter, Meera. Lakhan was shocked. Lakhan told Data to tell Meera what her mother had done 20 years back. The truth was that Prithvi and Meera were engaged. In sadness Meera deleted the photos of Akash from her phone. That night Data sends Meera back to Delhi. Lakhan saw this. He informed the driver to bring her back the next day. When Data came home the next day, he was shocked to see a group of men with sticks all ready to beat up Ramdhari.

They begin to beat up Ramdhari but are stopped by Prabha and Sunheri. Later they are about to blacken Data's face but are stopped by Meera. Prithvi also comes. Meera pleaded the villagers that if they wanted her to marry Prithvi, she would. Prithvi was confused and asked her what nonsense she was spitting out. Lakhan explains everything to Prithvi. Meera also says that she will marry Prithvi in the next 24 hours. Lakhan is shocked and sad that his plan failed. He again orders his men to kidnap Meera by making her faint. The servant of the house sees this and tells Prithvi and Data. Prithvi fights with all of them. He picks her up and tries to awaken her.

She wakes up and tells Prithvi that they are forced to marry. It's for the happiness of Datta. Datta arrives and so do the members of the Panchayat. They feel that Data had tried to kill her daughter. They asked if Datta had any answers to all this. Data stood dumbstruck. Prithvi said he has an answer. He removed his holy necklace and put it on Meera like a Mangalsutra. He was hurt while fighting and his hand was bleeding. With that he put a mark on Meera's forehead as Sindoor.

While all this Meera cried and Lakhan cried in sorrow. Data was about to take the newly wed couple home but Lakhan stopped them and said it looks bad if the bride goes to her own house with her husband. It is against Indian Culture. Meera should stay in Prithvi's house. Prabha dresses Meera up like a pretty bride and she performs the ritual of throwing rice behind yourself and your husband while leaving your mother's house.

They stay together for just a few days. Then the day came when Meera performed the ritual of Mukh Dikhai. On that very same day Sudha tracks Meera somehow and ends up in Meera's Mukh Dikhai ritual. Sudha gets worked up and forces Meera to leave with her for Delhi when Prithvi and Data try to stop her. The village does not agree on sending Meera away from Prithvi. The people of Hardoi celebrate Meera and Prithvi's marriage too.

A tycoon business man, Rajeev reveals that he his Prithvi's father and he has returned for Prithvi. He also reveals that Prithvi's mother, Nirmala is no more. In place of her is Kiran, who is now Prithvi's stepmother. Surprisingly, Kiran is the mother of Akash and his sister Sanjana. Prithvi is taken aback. He is not very keen on going back with Rajeev as he does not trust them. He also is heart broken as Data had hidden this secret from him. At the same time, Meera know admits that she is deeply in love with Prithvi. Somehow she had to go with him. Akash sympathizes and executes a plan. He instructs Meera to pretend that she is willing to marry Akash. In turn she will be able to return with him to Rajeev's bungalow.

They meet Kiran, Rajeev's eavesdropping sister, Komal, Rajeev's wife, Sanjana, Akash's modern, stylish sister and later, Dadi, the eldest member of the family. Komal, Kiran and Sanjana can't stand Prithvi at all. Kiran decides to leave the house as Prithvi drove her crazy. Prithvi finds it hard to adapt to city life. He also attempted to wear western clothes at a party but ended up embarrassed, as everyone laughed at him. One day, Prithvi notices Rahul and Sanjana, who were having an affair with each other, romancing around in a corner. Prithvi questions her about her "Ghar Ke Sanskaar". Rahul tells Prithvi to "back off" resulting in a fight. Sanjana warns Prithvi to never come into the personal matters of her life while Rahul escapes.

One day Prithvi went to the market to buy somethings when a message is flung to him. It says to leave the city and to return wherever he came from. He looks around but sees nobody. One night Prithvi is sleeping when he is almost attacked by a man with a knife, But Prithvi's amazing sixth sense helped him to shield himself. At first everyone presumes that it is Rahul but the truth opens up later in the story. Meera and Prithvi constantly have romance moments with each other and slowly Prithvi develops feelings for Meera, but does not want to express or admit that he loves Meera. Meera tries a lot to make him reveal what his heart feels, but stubborn Prithvi - He'll never do such a thing.

On the engagement day of Meera and Akash, Prithvi tells Akash that he is in love with Meera and can't stay without her. Aakash says that he is very happy and tells Prithvi to buy a gift for her. Akash creates a huge misunderstanding between Prithvi and Meera. Prithvi wanted to show his love and brought a Pearl Set for his lover. He calls Meera to the poolside in ten minutes. Meera was SO excited that she went straight away forgetting. She sees a shadow and without thinking or seeing hugs the person when that person is Akash! Prithvi sees from the back as what Meera wanted to say to Prithvi, was being told to Akash. Prithvi feels that he has been dumped. It is revealed that it was Akash who still loves Meera and want to kill Prithvi. Akash thinks that Prithvi will not survive and hits Prithvi from behind with a bat sending Prithvi in the pool. Akash thinks he has killed Prithvi. Meera asks Akash where Prithvi is. Prithvi regains his consciousness. Prithvi attacks Rahul thinking that he tried to kill him. Prithvi persuades Akash and Meera to exchange the rings, Meera faints. The engagement party is over.

Meera confronts Prithvi for being rude to her but Prithvi ignores her and leaves. Meera finds a link of the rosary, which Prithvi had brought for her. She figures out that Prithvi had come to the poolside to meet her, and misunderstood about her relationship with Akash. Meera wants to patch up with Prithvi. She tries to clear their misunderstandings in front of Akash. Nevertheless, Prithvi disbelieves her. Aakash pretends to be concerned about Meera and Prithvi, but Prithvi asks him to strengthen his relationship with Meera. Meera becomes outraged at Prithvi for not trusting her. Akash becomes overwhelmed on seeing their dispute and desires to win Meera's love. Rajiv and Akash want Prithvi to support them in their business.

Dadi asks Meera to patch up with Prithvi. Akash introduces Prithvi to his employees as his elder brother and appoints him as the head of his company. Meera visits Akash's office and becomes embarrassed on seeing Prithvi being insulted by the employees. She berates them for misbehaving with him. Nevertheless, Prithvi ignores her. Akash rusticates one of his employees for taunting Prithvi. Meera asks Reena to order food for Akash. Prithvi agrees to go to a meeting with Reena.

Reena wants to impress Prithvi, but he hates her gesture. Akash intends to ruin Prithvi and Meera's relationship. He asks Reena to blackmail Prithvi in order to expose his immoral character to Meera. However, Akash fails in his attempt. Reena praises Prithvi for rescuing her from Rohan and considers him as her brother. Meera becomes impressed with Prithvi. Prithvi performs the rituals of Holika Dahan in front of Meera and Aakash's family.

After much struggle, Meera and Prithvi finally marry. Ramdhari and Sudha are able to make Prithvi confess his love for Meera. This leaves Akash sad, worried and full of anger. The story shows their ever changing relationship of Meera and Prithvi with their burning love story. Their relationship which breaks easily, But deep in the heart, it holds them together forever.

Such a Fragile relationship. This newly - wed couple break apart as Prithvi misunderstands Meera, after he feels that Meera has lied to him. Akash snatches Meera's mangalsutra from her neck without her knowing it. Infuriated, Prithvi attempts to jump into the swimming pool to get it. Akash advises Meera to buy a similar mangalsutra and tell Prithvi that she has found it. So Meera follows exactly what Akash says and Prithvi becomes joyful and puts around her neck when Akash comes in screaming deliberately that he has found it. Prithvi feels that Meera has lied to her and their cycle of hatred continues.

Meera too is feeling something fishy about Akash. The burnt photos, sindoor replaced with ash, Prithvi being hit with a bat on the head, Prithvi's car having punctured wheels, Akash lying around with photos of their wedding and the Mangalsutra story. Meera feels that he is upset with their marriage. Akash feels that Sudha might know about his wicked plans and that she might spill the beans, this ruining his plans. He so murders her. Meera cries in anger and says that she will never leave her mother's murderer.

And So Sudha breathes her last, leaving Meera and the whole family shattered. Meera somehow finds out Akash is behind this crime. Akash stops Meera from telling the truth to Prithvi as he already is short-tempered, and after hearing this he will kill me (Akash) and so he shall be sent to jail and they shall be separated forever. Meera realises this and remains silent. Prithvi soon realises to that Akash has done the crime. He is eager to kill Akash with an axe but is stopped as he sees a thread which was tied around his wrist by Meera, to calm him down when he is angry. Prithvi does not say that he shall forgive Akash, he will surely teach him a lesson.

They make a plan during their SECOND Suhaagraat that they shall pretend to hate each other causing Akash to fall in their trap and possess Meera. They are to go to Ratlam and on the way they were to have a showdown but instead Akash goes in the other direction. Akash also forces Meera to remove all signs of Prithvi from her. Her mangalsutra, her bangles. She drops the bangles on the road one by one so that Prithvi can follow them. Akash then takes her to a deserted area and decides to marry her then and there as he had also forced her to sign divorce papers. Prithvi shall come in time, beat Akash and Meera shall shoot him unintentionally and Prithvi takes the blame.

== Cast ==
- Aditya Redij as
  - Prithvi Khanna (2012–2013)
  - Ishwar Pandey: A don; Shalu's husband; Prithvi's look alike (2013)
- Mouni Roy as Meera Singh Khanna
- Ajay Chaudhary as Akash Khanna
- Sara Khan as Shalu Ishwar Pandey: Ishwar's wife (2013)
- Kunal Bakshi as CBI Inspector Hooda
- Mithil Jain as Lakhan Singh
- Avinash Wadhawan as Rajeev Khanna: Prithvi and Akash's father
- Mamta Verma as Koran
- Sanjeev Tyagi as Mishra ji
- Lily Patel as Mrs. Khanna "Dadi"
- Shruti Ulfat as Thakurain Sudha "Bittu" Ramdhari Singh
- Shalini Kapoor Sagar as Kalki / Bhabhiji / Badi Thakurain
- Resha Konkar as Sunheri Ramdhari Singh
- Eva Shirali as Komal
- Ayan Khan as Ayan
- Sunil Sinha as Thakur Ramdhari Singh / Data Thakur
- Adaa Khan as Amrit
- Kabir Khan
