= Sunaina (TV series) =

- Genre: Fantasy; Sitcom; Comedy; Teen drama; Drama
- Directed by: Glenn Baretto; Ankush Mohla
- Opening theme: "Sunaina" by Shazneen Arethna
- Country of origin: India
- Original language: Hindi
- No. of seasons: 1
- No. of episodes: 23

Production
- Running time: 30 minutes (with commercials)

Original release
- Network: Pogo
- Release: 28 May – 26 October 2008

Sunaina - Mera Sapna Sach Hua (English: Sunaina - My dream became reality) or simply known as Sunaina was an Indian television series aired on Pogo channel. The show revolves around a 13-year-old girl Sunaina who has the ability to see the future in her dreams and follows the misadventures by those dreams.

== Cast ==
- Palak Jain as Sunaina Vijay Mathur - A 13 Year-Old Intelligent and Hardworking student Of Springs field High School; Vijay and Geethika's eldest daughter; Rishabh's elder sister; Rohan, Sohail, Nina and Ritu's Best Friend; Swagatika's arch rival.
- Umang Jain as Nina Kutty - A Confident and Outspoken student of Springs Field High School; Mr. and Mrs. Kutty's daughter; Rohan, Sohail, Sunaina and Ritu's Best Friend; Swagatika's arch rival.
- Jayshree Soni as Ritika Bhattacharya (Ritu) - An Sweet and Innocent student Of Springs field High School; Mr. and Mrs. Bhattacharya's daughter; Rohan, Sohail, Nina and Sunaina's Best Friend; Swagatika's arch rival.
- Devansh Doshi as Sohail Shaikh - An Curious and Funny student of Springs field High School; Mr. and Mrs. Shaikh's son; Sunaina, Nina and Ritu's Best Friend; Rohan's friendly rival; Swagatika's arch rival.
- Mridula Sathe as Swagatika Sharma - An Clever and Studious student of Springs field High School; Mr. and Mrs. Sharma's daughter; Ms. Malpekar's favourite student; Rohan's Best friend; Sohail, Sunaina, Nina and Ritu's arch rival.
- Kaustubh Thakare as Rohan Randhawa - A Popular Student Of Springs field High School; Mr. and Mrs. Randhawa's son; Swagatika, Sunaina, Nina and Ritu's Best friend; Sohail's arch rival.
- Kalika Vatnani as Ms. Malpekar - A Strict and Disciplined teacher of Springs field High School; Mr. Purushottam Malpekar's daughter; Swagatika's favourite teacher; Rohan, Sohail, Sunaina, Nina and Ritu's teacher; Mohit's College friend.
- Lalit Parimoo as Principal Shastri - A Principal of Springs field High School; Renuka's College friend.
- Pragati Mehra as Geethika Vijay Mathur - A successful actress and Caring housewife; Vijay's wife; Sunaina and Rishabh's mother.
- Nitesh Pandey as Vijay Mathur - A restaurateur and Successful businessman; Geethika's husband; Sunaina and Rishabh's father.
- Markand Soni as Rishabh Vijay Mathur - A 9 Year-Old Tech-Related student of Springs field High School; Vijay and Geethika's younger son; Sunaina's younger brother; David's Best friend; Sameer and Aditya's arch rival.
- Karthik Ghamthe as David - A Smart and Supportive student of Springs field High School; Rishabh's best friend; Sameer and Aditya's arch rival.
- Varun Shukla as Sameer Dhanaora - A Strong and Quick-Tempered Local Bully student Of Springs field High School; Mr. and Mrs. Dhanaura's son; Aditya's best friend; Rishabh and David's arch rival.
- Jiten Mukhi as Mr. Dhanaora - Trustee and board member of Springs Field High School; Mrs. Dhanaora's wife; Sameer's father.

== Episodes ==
No.	Title	Original release date
1	"Stay Away From Rohan!"	25 May 2008
Sunaina watches a dream in which she and Rohan run towards each other and suddenly a giant Ms. Malpekar arrives and pushes Rohan away capturing Sunaina in a cellphone like box. Rohan blames Sunaina for this to be happened. Sunaina after waking up decides to stay away from Rohan, whom every girl wants to stare and spending time with. She by mistake take her father's new cellphone to school, which was not allowed there. Rohan calls her for some help and she escapes from there. The phone falls from the bag in these chaos and Rohan picks it. Suddenly, Ms. Malpekar arrives and punishes Rohan and Sunaina to stay in the school after dispersal. Note: In this episode, every main character except Sunaina and her family was introduced with its name in its first scene. The order of introduction was : 'Ritu', 'Nina', 'Rohan', 'Swagatika', 'Ms. Malpekar (with a cross mark on 'Mrs.'), 'Sohail'.
2	"Mrs. Mathur and Mrs. Mathur!"	1 June 2008
Sunaina watches a dream, in which her mother is canceling her Manali trip. Next day, she gets involved in a fight with Swagatika. Ms. Malpekar arrives capturing Sunaina and calls for a meeting with her father or mother in principal's office. Sunaina in order to save her Manali Trip does not tell her parents about what happened at school. Instead, she ends up dressing up in her mother's outfit and goes to the principal's office to attend the meeting with Ms. Malpekar and principal Shastri, which creates all sorts of chaos. Meanwhile, Geethika finds certain injuries on the body of Rishabh caused by Sameer, about which she decides to complain to the Principal. She also arrives along with Rishabh to principal's office. Rishabh identifies Sunaina, but Geethika only thinks of the same saree she is wearing, same marks scored in last maths test being coincidental.
3	"The Burglar"	8 June 2008
Sunaina hears about regular burglary happening in her area. She then watches a dream in which she is tied with a rope and her mom's friend Dolly Aunty is shown to be killed with a knife. All point for a burglary. Next day, her parents go for a function in late night. They call Dolly aunty to watch their home after Sunaina requests them to not go. She falls in a deep sleep. Meanwhile, Rishabh keeps playing video games till late night. Sunaina calls Nina, Ritu and Sohail. They plans to catch and trap the thief. But due to Sohail's stupid ideas, they themselves get trapped. It causes chaos in the house. A religious burglar enters her house and somehow evades every trap. But Ritu, who was initially afraid accidentally causes the burglar to be slip.
4	"Interschool Quiz Contest"	15 June 2008
Sohail gets the opportunity to represent their school in the Interschool Quiz Contest with a prize money worth Rs. 50 thousands. Sunaina watches in her dream that Sohail is excitingly roaring 'Tanzania' many times, lots of money is falling and Rishabh is crying and a black kitten. She along with Ritu and Nina gets Sohail ready for every possible question regarding Tanzania. Sohail completely learns a whole book featuring it. Meanwhile Ritu and Nina tries to impress him by helping him in his science project in order to get some share from the prize money. However, Sohail answer 'Tanzania' for every question in the quiz resulting not a single correct answer. Next day, they watches a TV show asking a question of worth Rs. 10 lacs. Sohail answers it correctly as 'Tanzania' but only get a prize of Rs. 3 thousands.
5	"Rishabh Escaped !"	22 June 2008
Geethika tries to send Rishabh to skating classes on which he threats them that he will go away from the house. Sunaina watches in her dream that Rishabh is escaping and marking Amitabh Bachchan in Anthony look, an old man, skating classes and banning of video games as reasons. Ritu, Sohail and Nina comes up next day and gift him chocolates to make him happy. But everything goes wrong when Sohail by mistake breaks his favourite game's CD and gets the glass of juice be spread over the room, which annoys Geethika. She thinks that it is done by Rishabh and bans his TV watching and video games. It hurts Rishabh. Sunaina again watches a dream in which Rishabh is escaping considering Sunaina as the reason. When she wakes up in the midnight, she finds that Rishabh has escaped. She immediately calls her friends not telling her parents about that and tries to search Rishabh. Nina tells that Rishabh can be found in the Anthony Garden near his home.
6	"Sameer's Birthday Bash"	29 June 2008
Sunaina watches in her dream that Rohan in a magician's costume is attending a kids birthday party. She next day finds that Sameer's birthday is coming and Rishabh is refusing to attend his party. She in order to spend some time with Rohan agrees to Geethika to attend the party along with Rishabh. In school she finds that Sohail is going to attend that party as an anchor for getting two thousand rupees. She along with Nina and Ritu plans to let Rohan agree to attend the party and to let Sohail to agree to not attend the party. Unfortunately, Swagatika hears about their plan. When Sohail and Rohan agrees, she also in order to fail Sunaina's plan makes another plan with Sohail revealing the reality to him. When all of Sunaina, Nina, Ritu, Rishabh and Rohan reaches at the party, they become shocked when Swagatika and Sohail also arrive to present a magic performance.
7	"Party Or Maths Test !"	6 July 2008
Sunaina in her dream watches that Sohail is enjoying a party and Ms. Malpekar is saying 'surprise' again and again times. Next day, she finds that Rohan is giving a late night party and everyone in the class is invited. Sunaina thinking that Ms. Malpekar will keep a surprise maths test on the next day to the party. She, Ritu and Sohail decide to not attend the party and instead, to study at Sunaina's home. Nina decides to attend the party and refuses to study as she don't believes on her dream. But eventually, in night she reaches at her home changing her decision. But Sohail do not reaches for study and tells Sunaina on phone that he is attending and enjoying the party because Rohan's cousin Natasha is also there. He also tells that Rohan and Swagatika are dancing together. Meanwhile, Geethika forces Vijay to do some exercise which causes him injury at back and is brought to hospital. The next day, it is revealed that Ms. Malpekar is having her birthday and no test happens.
8	"Who Burst The Bomb ?"	13 July 2008
Sohail tries a trick to prank Swagatika. He keeps a bomb below her bench but it accidentally bursts at Ms. Malpekar. Swagatika hears Sohail laughing with Sunaina and others. She gets known to the plan and decides to tell the truth to Ms. Malpekar. Sunaina watches in her dream spectacles and tape recorder. She makes a plan. Ritu takes an interview of Swagatika and records her voice in the tape recorder. Nina then goes to Ms. Malpekar and removes her glasses and keeps them away from her. Sunaina arrives after Nina leaves and she starts the tape recorder telling Ms. Malpekar in Swagatika's voice that she don't know who burst the bomb. Sohail plays cross-word puzzle along with Rohan and asks him for a last word remained. He answer it correctly after some hints as 'bomb'. They in front of Swagatika asks Rohan 'the brilliant idea of bomb was whom ?' in the sense that Swagatika will not tell Ms. Malpekar the truth in order to save Rohan from suspending from the school. Still after Rohan agrees that it was he, Swagatika tries to call Ms. Malpekar to tell the truth.
9	"The Angry Librarian"	20 July 2008
Sunaina issues a book from the town library, on which the angry librarian Mrs. Kadake tells her that if she will somehow harms the book, then her membership would be cancelled. She watches in her dream that Mrs. Kadake has cancelled her library membership. This makes her worried. She takes its care. But in school it gets destroyed by tomato soup due to the fight between Rishabh and Sameer. Sunaina learns that an award-winning writer Dr. Madhu Milind Joshi is coming to the library in a seminar. So she requests Sohail and Nina to become Dr. Joshi and his assistant. They make the plan that when Sohail will eat his lunch with Mrs. Kadake, he will somehow disturb her in order to slip the pulse from her hand and as Sunaina would already kept the book on the same table, it will again get destroyed and Mrs. Kadake would herself be blamed for it instead of Sunaina and her membership would be saved.
10	"At The Parlour"	27 July 2008
Ritu's mom doesn't allow her to go for a trip along with her friends, instead she sends her to Kathak classes. Geethika orders Sunaina to take Rishabh to beauty parlour for haircut. Before going, Sunaina sleeps and watches in her dream that she is stuck in the hairs of a lady. Sunaina after being afraid about this sends Sohail with Rishabh. Sohail becomes busy in impressing girls and Rishabh tries to escape from there after he finds Sameer there and becomes afraid about what would happen if he will know that Rishabh is cutting his hairs in ladies parlour. Sameer's mom lifts him to his home. Karen, the parlour owner gets fainted by slipping and Sohail calls Sunaina there for help. When Sunaina arrives, she assists in haircutting of the lady whom she watched in her dream. She completely destroys her hair, angering her.
11	"Student Of The Year"	3 August 2008
The award for 'Student Of The Year' is to be given to a student. Sunaina watches in her dream that principal Shastri is wearing cricket outfit with a jar of pickel in his hand saying snow is falling in Canada. Ms. Malpekar gives them an assignment that is to be submitted on the day, when she tells that she will be absent. Sunaina, Nina and Ritu after knowing from Swagatika that principal Shastri loves pickels, gifts him different pickels. Meanwhile, Sohail joins the school cricket team thinking that it may help him to get the award as it was connected to Sunaina's dream and gets injured. Principal Shastri becomes sick by eating all four pickels together. Sunaina, Nina, Ritu and Sohail do not complete their assignments and help the Principal to complete his work thinking Ms. Malpekar is absent. While Principal Shastri goes home to watch T-20 Cricket.
12	"Principal Shastri's Hairstyle"	10 August 2008
Sunaina watches in her dream that Principal Shastri is eating a sandwich with hairs inside and blaming Sunaina for this to be happened and watches a yellow sweater. Next day, Principal Shastri fixes a meeting with his college friend Ms. Renuka Das on the following day in school, whom he hasn't met for a very long time. When they met for the last time, his hairs were so long and curly, but now there are much less and about to finish. Nina comes wearing the same sweater. Principal Shastri wears a wig that looks same as his hairs were in his college time. Rohan borrows Nina's sweater and one of the ends of wool gets stuck in chair and another lies connected with Rohan's sweater, which causes Principal Shastri to fall and his wig slips in front of Renuka, opening his hair's truth.
13	"The Antique Painting"	17 August 2008
Sohail brings an antique 18th century painting from Chor Bazaar. Sunaina watches is her dream that she along with Sohail and her father is enjoying in a car as they would become rich. She requests her father to buy that painting thinking that it would be sold in lacs of rupees. Sohail firstly wants 3 crore rupees for that. But, when Vijay tells him that a famous archeologist Lalji Bhai Gubbarewala will check that whether it is original or fake, Sohail sells it only for Rs. 3000. Sunaina do not tells about her dream to Sohail and Sohail also do not tells Sunaina that the painting is fake and he knows it already. Vijay bets with his friends for Rs. 10,000 for being the painting fake and while cleaning it, they find that it is fake. Sunaina brings Sohail after making him fake Lalji Bhai Gubbarewala, so that her father would not lose the bet.
14	"Bye Bye Nina !"	24 August 2008
Nina will have to go to Dubai as her father's job has transferred there. She doesn't want to go there leaving her friends. Sunaina watches in her dream a notebook, some flying shoes and oranges and a picture of Bipasha Basu. Rishabh wears new school shoes same as appeared in Sunaina's dream. Sohail steals Swagatika's maths notebook as it was the same appeared in Sunaina's dream and keeps it on Nina' desk and Nina gets caught by Ms. Malpekar. Meanwhile, Sohail learns that Bipasha Basu is shooting near their school. Rohan brings an orange and plays with Sohail by squeezing its peel in his eyes and gets caught by Ms. Malpekar. She then sends them to principal's office for playing and also sends Nina there for stealing the notebook. They squeezes the orange peel in Principal Shastri's eyes causing his eyes to release tears looking like he is crying. Meanwhile, Nina's father arrives in the school to take Nina's Transfer Certificate.
15	"Save The Restaurant !"	31 August 2008
Vijay decides to sell his restaurant with the famous restaurant chain 'Venus' run with one of his old college friend Mr. Aniruddh and his partner a builder Mr.Bajaj as a partner. A day before his restaurant's testing, his whole staff gets sick by food poisoning. Sunaina watches a dream that his father is cleaning the floor and Mr. Aniruddh is ordering him. Sunaina gets afraid about something crucial would happen with his father. She decides to prevent him from partnership. On the meeting, Nina and Ritu become waitress while Sunaina and Sohail become chef after fastening their chef Jugnu. They firstly tries to treat Mr. Shah the main owner of chain with very shrill soup but end up to give it to Vijay. Then they prepare a desert mixing everything thinking that Mr. Shah will not like that and will refuse to accept their restaurant, but it happens to be just opposite. He treats it as the best desert he has ever tasted and immediately accepts their restaurant to their chain.
16	"Niharika And Sohail's Tragedy"	7 September 2008
Sunaina watches in her dream that a fight would happen between she, Nina and Ritu due to someone named Niharika. Next day, she finds that Principal Shastri's niece named Niharika Shastri has come in their school for a visit from Delhi. She becomes much friendly with Sohail. She goes with him for movie and spends all her time in school with him. But Sunaina, Nina and Ritu try to break their friendship in order to prevent their possible fight. It causes a war between them and Sohail. They mix peppers in the chocolates Sohail gives to Niharika. They tell Niharika that Sohail keeps monthly girlfriends and lets them to wash his bicycle. It causes him and Niharika to break up. Guest Star: Lavina Tandon as Niharika Shastri
17	"Badminton V/S WWF"	14 September 2008
Sunaina watches in her dream that Principal Shastri is playing boxing with a badminton shutterstock in his hand. The next day, she learns that their new, still incomplete badminton ground is now replacing with a WWF ring. The main reason behind this was Mr. Dhanaura, the school trusty. He was just wanting to fulfill his son Sameer's wish to have one WWF ring in his school as he is a huge fan of WWF. Mr. Dhanaura pressures Principal Shastri to replace the badminton court with that of WWF. Sunaina makes a plan and requests Rishabh to fight with Sameer. When he agrees, they organize the fight between them in the school with Sohail as a referee. In between the fight Rishabh acts like his hand has broken. Then, Sameer becoming afraid of police feels sorry for what happened and changes his decision to have a WWF ring.
18	"Swagatika's Secret Diary"	21 September 2008
Sunaina and Geethika meet Swagatika and her mom. Swagatika again impresses Geethika by lying and showing good manners and telling her score in last maths test. She also tells Sunaina's score to Geethika which she had hidden from her. Geethika compares Sunaina with Swagatika hurting Sunaina and decides to send Sunaina for Maths tuition to Swagatika. At her home, when Swagatika moves out of her room, Sunaina discovers a secret diary in a pillow, in which Swagatika has written bad things about her gang and even Ms. Malpekar. Swagatika arrives and takes that back. Sunaina and her friends decide to steal the diary to reveal Swagatika's reality to everyone. Sunaina in her dream watches the diary and Italy's flag. As they already now that she will not give them any chance to enter her room, so they sends Rohan to her home. He eventually finds the diary and brings it to Sunaina's home. But after Swagatika finds her diary missing, she doubts over Rohan and Sunaina and reaches her home.
19	"Malu Meets Mohu"	28 September 2008
Sunaina watches a mysteryman in her dream who was appearing much romantically with Ms. Malpekar and he also stops her from beating Sunaina with a scale. Next day, Ms. Malpekar meets his college friend Mohit. He calls her as Malu and she calls him as Mohu. The two starts to live together in the school very romantically. It also brings a change between Ms. Malpekar's behavior and attitude. She wears contact lenses instead of spectacles. She then instead of strict becomes friendly teacher. She do not punishes students and even sings songs with them in class instead of studies. All students become happy. But Sunaina then watches another dream in which Mohit appears with a villainous look and laugh showing some photos of girls who may be his girlfriend. Sunaina along with her friends thinks that he is cheating Ms. Malpekar and decides to flash off his truth to her.
20	"Superstar Mom"	5 October 2008
Sunaina watches in her dream that Geethika has become a big superstar and even slaps a director, whereas she is in a charwoman's getup. Next day Geethika decides to leave the film industry as she was not getting offers suitable to her. Sunaina requests her to attend the audition for the movie 'Mother India Part II' which was to be directed by the same director whom Geethika slapped in her dream. Geethika agrees to attend the audition. Then Sohail tries to impress the director and his assistant by more and more praising of Geethika treating her as a very big superstar and himself as an assistant director and her manager. The two agrees to give her a chance. When they reach for the audition, Geethika gets passed but they find that she is not getting the lead role but the role of a charwoman for just nineteen seconds. She becomes angry when the director makes fun of her and slaps him too.
21	"Ritu's Tragedy"	12 October 2008
Sunaina goes out of town for a wedding. She tells Ritu on phone that she has watched a dream about her and she should not give money to anyone because it would cause a fight between her and the borrower. Ritu as usual overreacts about the dream. Sohail wants 200 Rs. from her to buy Nina a gift for her birthday. She refuses to give and Sohail and Nina stop to talk to her. Principal Shastri also asks her for five rupee and promises to give it back but she in order to prevent the possible fight between them doesn't gives him money. Swagatika also asks her for five rupee to give a gift to Ms. Malpekar and she again refuses to give. She refuses Rohan also to give money for his party which is planned to organize. Even at her home, Sameer arrives while collecting some money and Ritu in order to prevent the fight with the son of school trusty doesn't give him money.
22	"Get Ms. Marphatia In !"	19 October 2008
Ms. Malpekar gets injured when she slips and her leg gets fractured. She remains absent for some days. A new teacher Ms. Mallika Marphatia comes to teach the class as a substitute. Every student likes her as she teaches very lightly as a primary class teacher, sings songs in class and even do not punishes students. When they know that Ms. Malpekar is again going to come to teach them, they get afraid as they want to teach from Ms. Marphatia and they has not completed Ms. Malpekar's assignments. Sunaina watches in her dream that she is shifting Rishabh's class teacher to Aefil Tower, Ms. Malpekar to his class and Ms. Marphatia to her class. Next day Principal Shastri tells them that Rishabh's class teacher is going to Paris and he is making Ms. Marphatia as his new class teacher. Sohail getups like Ms. Malpekar's father Mr. Purushottam Malpekar, an old scientist and requests the Principal to transfer Ms. Malpekar to junior classes as she is getting tent while teaching senior class students. Principal Shastri agrees and makes Ms. Marphatia as Sunaina's class teacher and Ms. Malpekar as Rishabh's class teacher.
23	"Get Ms. Marphatia Out !"	26 October 2008
Ms. Marphatia the new Maths and Science teacher of Sunaina's class after becoming the permanent teacher shows her reality. She treats the students even more strictly then Ms. Malpekar. She punishes them like primary class students like to keep finger on lips, to stand on bench and to hit on their hands through stick. Everyone again wants Ms. Malpekar to become their teacher instead of Ms. Marphatia. Sunaina watches in her dream that she is the participant of the show 'Hole In The Wall', where a spider shaped hole arrives pushing her in the pool. Next day, Ms. Marphatia teaches them about a rare breed of spider called 'Quashimoko' only found in Kongo, Africa, which can cause memory lose. Sunaina with Nina, Ritu, Sohail and Rohan makes a plan and spreads a rumour that Sohail's photographer uncle has brought the same spider to him. Then they all in front of Ms. Marphatia act as they have gotten memory lose including Principal Shastri who actually suffers from the same problem. Note: In the end of the episode, Sunaina is shown sleeping in the class and after awakening tries to tell about her dream, on which everyone present in the class including Principal Shastri, Ms. Malpekar, Nina, Sohail, Rohan, Swagatika and Rishabh (Ritu is not shown) stops her by whooping 'No' loudly. This episode also shows a promo of Hole In The Wall.
