= BIG Memsaab =

Indian television reality show

- Genre: Reality show
- Country of origin: India
- Original language: Hindi

Production
- Production location: India
- Production company: Reliance Broadcast Network Limited

Original release
- Network: BIG Magic

BIG Memsaab is a reality show aired on Reliance Broadcast Network Limited’s regional channel BIG Magic. It provides housewives from central India a platform to showcase their skills, personality, creativity and talent. BIG Memsaab is a knock-out show wherein one contestant is eliminated at the end of every episode. It is judge by Sambhavna Seth, and Karishma Tanna with current host Pritam Singh. BIG Memsaab also has a Punjabi version called BIG Punjaban which airs on the Spark Punjabi. This is the flagship show for the channel with most number of seasons and has recently ended its seventh season on 12 July 2013.

== Show Host and Co-Host ==
Season 5 - Host: Natasha Sharma; Co-host: Manish Goel
Season 6 & Season 7 - Host: Parul Chauhan;

Co-Host: Priyesh Sinha
