= Natasha Sharma =

Indian actress

- Occupation: Actress
- Years active: 2009–2015
- Known for: Na Aana Is Des Laado; Yahan Main Ghar Ghar Kheli
- Spouse: Aditya Redij (m. 2014)

Natasha Sharma Redij is an Indian actress who mainly work in Hindi television. She made her acting debut in 2009 and is best known for her portrayal of Sia Sangwan in Na Aana Is Des Laado. She also participate in Comedy Circus Ke SuperStars in 2010 and portrayed Vasundhara in Yahan Main Ghar Ghar Kheli.

== Personal life ==
Sharma got engaged to her boyfriend actor Aditya Redij on 29 April 2012. They got married in 2014. The duo welcomed their first child, a son in October 2022.

== Career ==
Sharma made her acting debut with Na Aana Is Des Laado portraying Sia Sangwan opposite Aditya Redij from 2009 to 2010. It proved as a major turning point in her career. She received Indian Telly Award for Best Actress in a Lead Role nomination for her performance.

She appeared as a Contestant on Comedy Circus Ke SuperStars with Kapil Sharma and also appeared in an episode of Aahat, both in 2010. In 2011, she made her Hindi film debut with Luv Ka The End portraying BBC Website.

Sharma portrayed Vasundhara in Yahan Main Ghar Ghar Kheli in 2012. The same year, she appeared in an episode of Lakhon Mein Ek as Shilpa. She also hosted BIG Memsaab with Manish Goel in 2012.

In 2015, she portrayed a News Reporter in her Punjabi film debut Sardaar Ji.

== Filmography ==
=== Films ===
Year	Title	Role	Language	Notes	Ref.
2011	Luv Ka The End	BBC Website	Hindi	Cameo appearance	
2015	Sardaar Ji	News Reporter	Punjabi	Cameo appearance	

=== Television ===
Year	Title	Role	Notes	Ref.
2009-2010	Na Aana Is Des Laado	Sia Sangwan		
2010	Comedy Circus Ke SuperStars	Contestant		
2010	Aahat	Unknown	Season 4	
2012	Yahan Main Ghar Ghar Kheli	Vasundhara		
2012	Lakhon Mein Ek	Shilpa	Episodic role	
2012	BIG Memsaab	Host	Season 5	

== Awards and nominations ==
Year	Award	Category	Work	Result	Ref.
2010	Indian Telly Awards	Best Actress in a Lead Role	Na Aana Is Des Laado	Nominated	

== See also ==
- List of Hindi television actresses
