= Lakhon Mein Ek (TV series) =

Television series

- Genre: Reality Show
- Directed by: Rahul Dholakia, Ashwin Chaudhary
- Starring: Pooja Gaur; Anita Hassanandani
- Theme music composer: Sukhwinder Singh
- Country of origin: India
- Original language: Hindi
- No. of seasons: 1
- No. of episodes: 26

Production
- Producer: Siddharth Basu
- Production locations: Maharashtra, India
- Running time: 46 minutes
- Production company: Big Synergy

Original release
- Network: Star Plus
- Release: 5 August 2012 – 27 January 2013

Lakhon Mein Ek (transl. One in a million) is an Indian television show, which premiered on Star Plus in August 2012 and ended in January 2013. The programme depicts real-life stories narrated by Pooja Gor which aired during Sundays. The opening theme is composed and sung by Sukhwinder Singh, whilst the lyrics have been written by Gulzar.

== Cast ==
- Pooja Gaur as Narrator
- Anita Hassanandani as Neelam Kapoor (Episode 11)
- Harsh Vashisht as Shilpa's Husband (Episode 16)
- Aditi Sharma as Venkatlaxmi (Episode 18)
- Gurdeep Kohli as Anu (Episode 22)
- Natasha Sharma as Shilpa
- Ankur Nayyar as Sushant (Episode 23)
- Manav Gohil as Mahesh / Kailash Satyarthi (Episode 24 & Episode 25)
- Supriya Pilgaonkar as Kalpana
- Tushar Dalvi as Kalpana's husband
- Kiran Kumar
