= Kapil Nirmal =

Indian television actor

- Born: Kapil; Jaipur, Rajasthan, India
- Occupation: Actor
- Years active: 2007–2015; 2018; 2021–2022; 2025–present

Kapil Nirmal is an Indian television actor who is best known for his portrayal of Yudhishthir Sisodia in the Star Plus serial Raja Ki Aayegi Baraat.

== Career ==
Kapil Nirmal began his acting career with ETV Rajasthan's show, Ina Meena Dika, then he appeared in the television film, Roop Ki Rani. Kapil then shifted to Mumbai where he worked with Reliance Big Pictures. His first break as a lead happened with the show Shakira – The End of Evil where he played A.C.P. Abhay Singh on Bindass Channel. After which he portrayed the role of Yudhishthir Sisodia in the daily Star Plus showRaja Ki Aayegi Baraat. He has participated in the season 4 of Nach Baliye 4 with Anjali Abrol and was also a part of the second season of Zara Nachke Dikha. He had a guest appearance in Tere Liye as a part of the Durga Puja celebration. He played the character of Sarjerao Bhonsle im Pardes Mein Mila Koi Apna. Later he went on to play the role of Surya Singh Rana in Na Aana Is Des Laado. He was also seen in Ek Veer Ki Ardaas...Veera as Nihal Singh, Box Cricket League as part of Ahmedabad Express and Bhootu as Vikram.

He has made an appearance in Javed Ali's music album Yaara.

== Filmography ==
=== Film ===
Year	Title	Role	Notes
2024	Vedaa	API Bhimsen Purohit	

=== Television ===
Year	Title	Role	Channel
2007–2008	Shakira – The End of Evil	A.C.P. Abhay Singh	Bindass
2008–2010	Raja Ki Aayegi Baraat	Yudhishthir Sisodia	Star Plus
2010	Tere Liye	Kapil Nirmal (Special Appearance on the occasion of Durga Puja)	Star Plus
2011	Pardes Mein Mila Koi Apna	Sarjerao Bhonsle	Imagine TV
2011–2012	Na Aana Is Des Laado	Surya Singh Rana	Colors TV
2012–2013; 2014	Ek Veer Ki Ardaas...Veera	Nihal Singh	Star Plus
2014	Ishq Kills	Devendra Sood (Episode 4)	Star Plus
2018	Bhootu	Vikram	Zee TV
2021	Shakti – Astitva Ke Ehsaas Ki	Jeet	Colors TV
2022	Baal Shiv – Mahadev Ki Andekhi Gatha	Maharaj Tarakasur	&TV
2025	Mangal Lakshmi	Kapil Bhatnagar	Colors TV

== Reality Shows ==
Year	Show	Role	Channel
2008–2009	Nach Baliye 4	Contestant	Star Plus
2010	Zara Nachke Dikha	Contestant	Star Plus
2014–2015	Box Cricket League	Contestant	Sony Entertainment Television
