= Aditya Redij =

Indian television actor

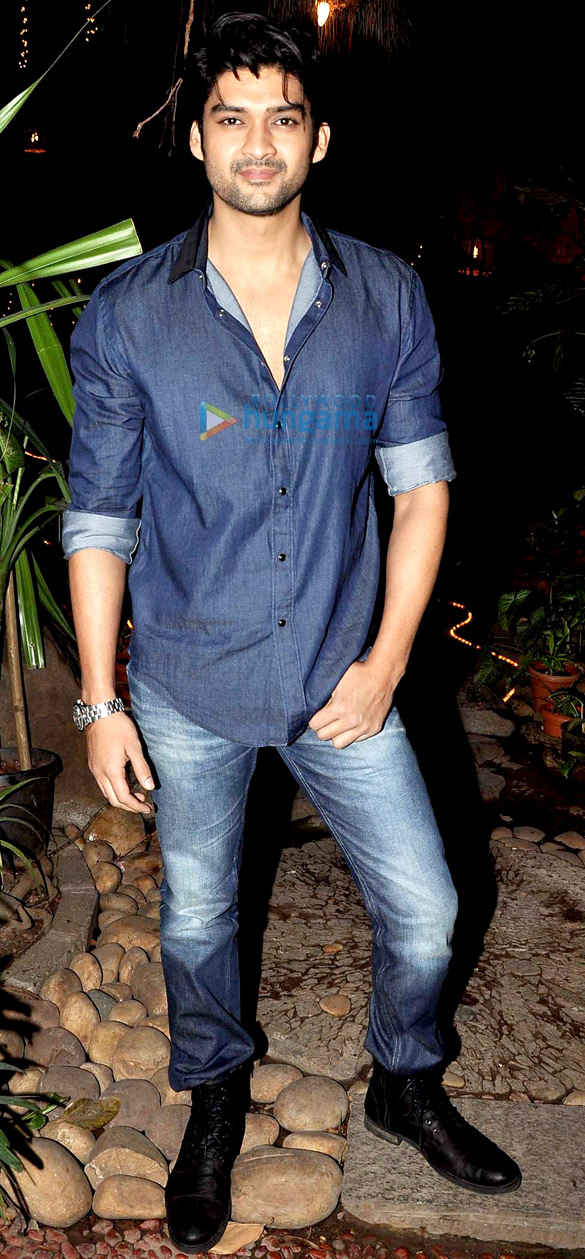
- Redij in 2014
- Occupation: Actor
- Years active: 2007–present
- Television: Na Aana Is Des Laado
- Spouse: Natasha Sharma (m. 2014)
- Parent: Bipin Redij (father)

Aditya Redij is an Indian television actor known for portraying Maharaj Bamni in Porus, Raghav Saghvan in Na Aana Is Des Laado, Prithvi Khanna and Ishwar Pandey in Junoon – Aisi Nafrat Toh Kaisa Ishq and Shiva Lashkare in Bawara Dil.

== Personal life ==
Redij got engaged to girlfriend Natasha Sharma on 29 April 2012. They got married in 2014. The duo welcomed their first child, a son in October 2022.

== Filmography ==
=== Film ===
Year	Film	Role	Ref.
2007	Zabardast	Shantanu "Shanty"	
2008	Jalsa	Gagan	
2015	Baby	Kartik	

=== Television ===
Year	Serial	Role	Notes	Ref.
2009–2010	Na Aana Is Des Laado	Raghav Singh Sangwan	Lead Role	
2011–2012	Sawaare Sabke Sapne... Preeto	Rajveer Singh	Lead Role	
2012–2013	Junoon – Aisi Nafrat Toh Kaisa Ishq	Prithvi Khanna	Lead Role	
2013	Junoon – Aisi Nafrat Toh Kaisa Ishq	Ishwar Pandey	Negative Role	
2014	Yeh Hai Aashiqui	Aditya	Episodic Role	
2014	Encounter	Inspector Bhagat Dave	Episodic Role	
2014	Bandhan – Saari Umar Humein Sang Rehna Hai	Mahesh Karlik	Supporting Role	
2016	Meri Awaaz Hi Pehchaan Hai	Karan Kapoor	Supporting Role	
2017	Peshwa Bajirao	Shivaji	Supporting Role	
2017–2018	Porus	Maharaj Bamni	Supporting Role	
2021	Bawara Dil	Shiva Lashkare	Lead Role	
2022	Ishq Ki Dastaan – Naagmani	Naagraj Shankar	Lead Role	
2022–2023	Ishq Ki Dastaan – Naagmani	Shankar Rana	Lead Role	
2024–2025	Tenali Rama	Maharaj Krishnadevray	Season 2	
2026–present	Dr. Aarambhi	Dr. Viswas Tandon		

=== Reality Shows ===
Year	Show	Role
2010	Kitchen Champion	Guest Contestant
2016	Box Cricket League 2	Contestant
2021	Bigg Boss (Hindi TV series) season 14	Shiva Lashkare (Guest)

== Awards and nominations ==
Year	Award	Category	Show	Result
2009	Indian Telly Awards	Best Actor in Negative Role	Na Aana Is Des Laado	Nominated
2010	Indian Telly Awards	Most Popular Actor	Na Aana Is Des Laado	Nominated
