= Raja Ki Aayegi Baraat (TV series) =

Indian drama television series

- Logo
- Genre: Drama; Romance; Supernatural thriller
- Directed by: Pankaj Kumar, Taraknath Mourya, and Pawan Kumar
- Starring: See Below
- Opening theme: "Raja Ki Aayegi Baraat" by Alka Yagnik
- Country of origin: India
- Original language: Hindi
- No. of episodes: 637

Production
- Producers: RD Sharma, Saroj Sharma, and Rashmi Sharma
- Running time: 24 minutes

Original release
- Network: Star Plus
- Release: 21 January 2008 – 1 October 2010

Raja Ki Aayegi Baraat is an Indian television series that aired on Star Plus between 2008 and 2010. The show outlined the journey of Rani, who goes from being a servant of a palace to being the queen of Rajkumar Yudhishthir. The serial was produced by Rashmi Sharma Telefilms for M-Net Original Production.

== Plot ==
Raja Ki Aayegi Baraat is the journey of Rani as she goes from being a servant to becoming the queen of the palace, and how she manages the responsibilities of a queen and daughter-in-law. After many obstacles, Rajkumar Yudhishthir and Rani finally unite.

Rani gives birth to a daughter. Ira, a ghost, was in love with Rani's husband, Kuvar Yudhishthir; she came as the baby's nanny. Rani comes in disguise of an old woman Bhoomi to find out about Ira. Bhoomi finds out that Ira's real name is Mohini and about how wicked she was in her past and her home, Bhavan-bitti-ki-kotri. Ira disables Bhoomi's speech so she can't tell anyone about her evilness. After a battle, Rani manages to win and Bhoomi gets back her speech.

Rani and Yudhishthir both die in a car accident, leaving their young daughter, Sandhya alone. At first, Sandhya was named Mohini but, upon realizing that Ira's real name was Mohini, they changed it. Mohini (Ira) curses Sandhya as she dies, to seek revenge from Rani that her face becomes ugly at dusk. A new maid Sajili has come to their palace, only to steal. She has a thief son, Virendra/Viru. Viru along with his friend, Balma, pretends to be the prince Kuvar Veer to fool the royal family. Raja Sahib and Choti Rani plan a wedding with Viru and Sandhya as they think her marriage with Virendra will break Mohini (Ira)'s spell. Rudra and Bhoomi are not shown. Kuvar Aryaman, Bhoomi and Rudra's son, who is younger than Sandhya, has put a man called Rajveer in Viru's place. Sandhya has accepted her marriage with Rajveer. They both plan to seduce Sandhya.

Sandhya knows little that Aryaman and Rajveer are planning to ruin her life. They also created a duplicate Sandhya by cloning her by taking blood samples, hair, skin, nails etc. Later Aryaman and Rajveer apologize to the royal family and Sandhya as well. The duplicate is said to be destroyed and Mohini's spell is recovered. Then the serial ends in a happy note as the whole cast re-assembles.

== Cast ==
- Anjali Abrol as Rajkumari Rani Yudhishthir Sisodia
- Kapil Nirmal as Rajkumar Yudhishthir Sisodia
- Mrinal Kulkarni as Kalyani Sisodia "Chhoti Rani"
- Dimple Jhangiani as Sandhya
- Pankaj Dheer as Mr. Sisodia "Raja Sahab"
- Amit Dua as Kunwar Rudra
- Kanika Maheshwari / Tiya Gandwani as Rajkumari Bhoomi
- Ravi Bhatia as Balma
- Arjun Mahajan as Veer
- Ali Merchant as Kunwar Angad
- Jyotsna Karyekar as Dadi
- Siddharth Gupta as Munna
- Alihassan Turabi as Bhushan
- Kushal Punjabi as Neel
- Poonam Gulati as Ami
- Rishika Mihani as Ira
- Guddi Maruti as Chachi / Chunderkaliah
- Ira Soni as Rajkumari Nandini
- Anurag Prapanna as Chacha / Surdurion
- Nupur Alankar as Thumki Bua
- Apara Mehta as Jhumki Bua
- Upasana Singh as Bhanumati
- Divyajyotee Sharma as Kali
- Pallavi Subhash Chandran as Namki
- Dishank Arora as Kuwar Aryamaan
- Anuradha as Badi Rani
- Zafar as Agni
- Prithvi Zutshi as Lawyer
- Raj Singh Suryavanshi as Saksham
- Sunayana Fozdar as Niharika
- Via Roy Chaudhary as Imli / Sona
- Mahesh Chandra Bhatt as Kidnapper
- Hina Khan as Akshara
- Puja Banerjee as Vrinda
- Giaa Manek as Gopi
- Rucha Hasabnis as Rashi
- Shweta Tiwari as Prerna
- Additi Gupta as Heer
- Ragini Khanna as Suhana
- Anupriya Kapoor as Tani
- Sara Khan as Sadhna
- Parul Chauhan as Ragini
- Pooja Gor as Pratigya

== Production ==
In November 2008, the shootings and telecast of all the Hindi television series including this series and films were stalled on 8 November 2008 due to dispute by the technician workers of FWICE (Federation of Western India Cine Employees) for increasing the wages, better work conditions and more breaks between shootings. FWICE first took a strike on 1 October 2008 when they addressed their problems with the producers and production was stalled. A contract was signed after four days discussions and shooting were happening only for two hours content in a day then after which differences increased between them while channels gave them time until 30 October 2008 to sort it out. Failing to do so lead to protests again from 10 November 2008 to 19 November 2008 during which channels blacked out new broadcasts and repeat telecasts were shown from 10 November 2008. On 19 November 2008, the strike was called off after settling the disputes and the production resumed. The new episodes started to telecast from 1 December 2008.

Raja Ki Aayegi Baraat was replaced by the TV serial Maryada: Lekin Kab Tak? on 4 October 2010.
