= Laado 2 =

- Also known as: Laado – Ek Nayi Shuruaat
- Genre: Soap opera
- Starring: See below
- Opening theme: Laado Badlegi Kahaani by Asees Kaur
- Country of origin: India
- Original language: Hindi
- No. of seasons: 2
- No. of episodes: 133

Production
- Producer: Dhaval Gada
- Camera setup: Multi-camera
- Running time: 22 minutes
- Production company: Dhaval Gada Productions

Original release
- Network: Colors TV
- Release: 6 November 2017 – 20 May 2018

Related
- Na Aana Is Des Laado

Laado 2 – Veerpur Ki Mardani (transl. Lovely daughter 2 – Manlike of Veerpur) is an Indian drama show that premiered on 6 November 2017 on the Colors TV channel. It replaced the show Ek Shringaar-Swabhiman. It is the season 2 of Laado. It is a sequel of the 2009 series Na Aana Is Des Laado.

The story revolves around Ammaji (Malik), a powerful and conservative matriarch who supported female infanticide in Na Aana Is Des Laado, who is now a transformed woman. She and her elder granddaughter, Anushka (Gor) fight for women's rights as they try to change people's outlooks.

== Overview ==
Season	No. of episodes	Originally broadcast (India)	
Season	No. of episodes	Series premiere	Series finale
1	870	9 March 2009	27 July 2012
2	133	6 November 2017	23 May 2018

== Cast ==
=== Main ===
- Meghna Malik as Bhagwani Devi Dalveer Sangwan / Ammaji: Dalveer's widow; Balveer's mother; Anushka and Jhanvi's grandmother (2017–2018)
- Avika Gor as Anushka Balveer Sangwan / Anushka Yuvraj Singh Choudhary: Ammaji's grand daughter; Balveer's daughter; Jhanvi's sister; Yuvraj's widow; Juhi's impostor; Shaurya's love (2017–2018)
- Palak Jain as Jhanvi Sangwan: Ammaji's granddaughter; Balveer's daughter; Anushka's sister (2017)
- Shaleen Malhotra as Yuvraj Gunwant Singh Choudhary: Gunwant's son; Komal's brother; Rantej, Ranveer and Tej's cousin; Anushka's late husband (2017–2018)
- Siddharth Arora as Shaurya Ajmera: Juhi's friend who falls for Anushka assuming her to be Juhi (2018)
- Vinny Arora Dhoopar as Juhi Sethi / Juhi Rajput: Sandeep's daughter; Shagun's step-daughter; Kuldeep's half-sister; Indra Baba's adopted daughter; Shaurya's friend (2018)

=== Recurring ===
- Rituraj Singh as Balwant Singh Choudhary: Gunwant, Rajjo and Kulwant's brother; Malhari's first husband; Rantej and Ranveer's father; Yuvraj, Tej and Komal's uncle (2017–2018)
- Zalak Desai as Komal Singh Choudhary / Komal Dharamshankar Kriplani: Gunwant's daughter; Yuvraj's sister; Rantej, Ranveer and Tej's cousin; Dharamshankar's young wife (2017–2018)
- Charu Asopa as Kajal Kuldeep Sethi: Kuldeep's wife (2018)
- Ankit Raaj as Ranveer Balwant Singh Choudhary: Balwant and Malhari's son; Rantej's brother; Yuvraj, Tej and Komal's cousin; one of Jhanvi's rapists; Indra Baba's step-son (2017–2018)
- Adhvik Mahajan as Dr. Vishal Chandran: Anushka's helper (2018)
- Farida Dadi as Kavita Avtar Sethi: Sandeep's mother; Kuldeep and Juhi's grandmother (2018)
- Ashu Sharma as Amrish Upadhyay: Shagun's brother; Kuldeep's uncle (2018)
- Arjun Aneja as Kuldeep Sethi: Sandeep and Shagun's son; Juhi's half-brother; Kajal's husband (2018)
- Mamta Luthra / Unknown as Swarna "Taai" Kirloskar: Juhi's nanny and namesake mother (2018)
- Nasir Khan as Advocate Dharamshankar Kriplani: Komal's old husband (2018)
- Manini Mishra as Shagun Upadhyay / Shagun Sandeep Sethi: Amrish's sister; Sandeep's first wife; Kuldeep's mother; Juhi's step-mother (2018)
- Ananya Khare as Malhari Balwant Singh Choudhary / Malhari Indra Rajput: Balwant and Indra Baba's wife; Rantej and Ranveer's mother; Yuvraj, Tej and Komal's aunt (2017–2018)
- Nimai Bali as Indra Rajput / Indra Baba: Juhi's adoptive father; Malhari's second husband; Rantej and Ranveer's step-father (2018)
- Dakssh Ajit Singh as Rantej Balwant Singh Choudhary: Balwant and Malhari's son; Ranveer's brother; Yuvraj, Tej and Komal's cousin; Meera's ex-husband; one of Jhanvi's rapists; Indra Baba's step-son (2017–2018)
- Saii Ranade Sane as Meera Rantej Singh Choudhary: Rantej's ex-wife (2017–2018)
- Hemann Choudhary as Tejnath "Tej" Kulwant Singh Choudhary: Kulwant's son; Rantej, Yuvraj, Ranveer, Tej and Komal's cousin; one of Jhanvi's rapists (2017–2018)
- Moni Rai as Kulwant Singh Choudhary (2017–2018)
- Gulfam Khan as Rajjo Kaur Choudhary (2017–2018)
- Simran Natekar as Chameli "Chunki" Dhumal Das (2017–2018)
- Paaras Madaan as Jaidev "Jai" Rajdheer Das (2017)
- Kapil Soni as Baldev Rajdheer Das (2017)
- Sudipti Parmar as Shanti Baldev Das (2017)
- Prakash as Dhumal Rajdheer Das (2017–2018)
- Meenal Kapoor as Saroj Rajdheer Das (2017–18)
- Ahmad Harhash as Ram Chatturvedi (2017–18)

=== Special appearances ===
- Meera Deosthale as Chakor Suraj Rajvanshi from Udaan on 1 February 2018 and on 2 February 2018 - to help Anushka find her missing paternal grandmother, Ammaji (2018)
- Vijayendra Kumeria as Suraj Rejvanshi from Udaan Sapnon Ki
- Jasmin Bhasin as Teni from Dil Se Dil Tak
- Rohan Gandotra as Parth Bhanushali from Dil Se Dil Tak

== Characters's summaries ==
=== Main characters summaries ===
- Meghna Malik as Bhagwani Devi Sangwan also known as the Ammaji of Veerpur:
  - She hails from Veerpur & later settled in Delhi along with her granddaughters. She was a retired woman whose only aim was to protect her granddaughters. She addressed the sensitive issues of women's dignity and rights. She gave good values to her granddaughters & took the responsibility of protecting them. It becomes a shattering moment for her when she loses Jhanvi to the bad clutches of Veerpur. After Jhanvi's Death she sets a mission to punish Jhanvi's rapists but later she was killed.
- Avika Gor as Anushka Sangwan / Anushka Yuvraj Choudhary was Ammaji's elder granddaughter:
  - She was a law student. She was a brave, daring, independent girl and has ability to take strict decisions. She believed in gender equality and can't tolerate any injustice towards women. She try to bring a change in Veerpur to protect the women. She cared for her younger sister Jhanvi and was determined to avenge her younger sister's sufferings followed by her murder and grandmother's murder and avenges by castrating Jhanvi's rapists. Situations forced her to live with a new identity of Juhi, who was the (daughter) of the well-known Sethi family of Chandigarh.
- Yuvraj Choudhary was Anushka's first love interest and husband:
  - He initially punished Anushka for Ammaji's sins of killing his parents. He even stabbed Ammaji for attempting to kill his father, Balwant but later on learning of his family's wrongdoings started supporting Anushka. He is shot while protecting her.
- Jhanvi Sangwan was Ammaji's younger granddaughter:
  - She was a cheerful, naughty, empathetic and idealistic girl. She was a prankster who was full of life. She was a short-lived girl as well as a loving younger sister. She is raped and murdered when she tries to emulate her sister (women's welfare) when she clips Rantej Singh to save his wife Meera.

=== Other characters ===
- Shaurya was Juhi's childhood friend who was in love with Juhi and considering Anushka as Juhi starts falling in love with him. He was a street fighter, a middle-class guy who was very intense and was motivated by love. He was insanely in love with Juhi who left him a few years ago. Because of that, he ends up doing something wrong, which lands him in juvenile house. After ten years, Shaurya realised that Juhi is back thinking Anushka is Juhi, which gave him a ray of hope to find his lost love and reconnect with her. He got engaged to Anushka considering her as Juhi on Dadi's insistence. On learning from Anushka that she is not Juhi, Shaurya confronts Anushka for playing with his emotions. He doesn't forgives Anushka. He wanted to make Anushka realize her mistake.
- Juhi Sethi was Indra Baba's adopted daughter. She was real Juhi who has fled away from her family ten years earlier with the help of her nanny. She was adopted by Indra. But for ten years he has mistreated her.
- Balwant Choudhary was the former patriarch of the Choudhary family. He was Malhari's first husband. He was Rantej and Ranveer's father. He was a dark figure, lurking in the shadows and drawing strength from the corridors of hell. He was vicious ruler of Veerpur which was a God forsaken land where women were treated like dirt as Meera's unborn girl child was killed, drawing parallel to the core plot of Na Aana Is Des Laado, that of female infanticide.
- Komal Choudhary / Komal Dharam Kriplani was Yuvraj's younger sister. She was Dharam's wife. When Anushka was living with the identity of Juhi in Chandigarh, She was the only link between Anushka's past and present.
- Kajal Kuldeep Sethi was Juhi's elder sister-in-law and Kuldeep's wife. She was a mentally unstable / challenged girl who showed childish behaviour and always played with a doll named Tulika. She loved Anushka as her sister-in-law.
- Ranveer Balwant Choudhary was Malhari and Balwant's younger son. He was Rantej's younger brother. He raped Jhanvi.
- Dr. Vishal was a doctor who castrated Rantej, Ranveer and Tej, thus, helping Anushka punish her sister's rapists. He was a veterinary doctor who helped Anushka in her fight to avenge the wrongdoings done to her family. He later became Meera's friend.
- Kavita Sethi was Juhi's paternal grandmother. She was a typical Punjabi grandmother: sweet and loving. She was the matriarch of the Sethi family.

== Background ==
=== Production ===
The show is produced by Dhaval Gada of Dhaval Gada Productions.

=== Casting ===
Earlier, there were rumours that Meghna Malik would be returning as the cruel and strict Ammaji. It was also said that the show will have the same setup with Raghav and Siya's daughter now playing the lead. The concept of the show remains the same as before. The show will have Ekta Kaul and Shoaib Ibrahim playing the protagonists while iMalik will play the antagonist.

But later it was officially announced that Malik as well as Avika Gor will be playing the lead roles in the series. It was declared that the show will feature Gor as the protagonist along with Palak Jain as her sister, Jhanvi who will be playing the parallel lead role in the series. It was also declared that Meghna Malik role will be positive in this series. Ammaji in this edition of Laado will be different in mind, body and appearance. She will be seen championing the cause of women and addressing sensitive issues of women's dignity, safety and rights. Later, Shaleen Malhotra was roped in to play the male lead role in the series.

=== Promo & extension ===
The first promo for the show was released on 5 October 2017. Laado touches upon the sensitive issue of castration. The series had a 6-month time jump in March 2018.

== Crossover episodes ==
Show name	Date	Name
Udaan	1 and 2 February 2018	Mahasangam

== Soundtrack ==
Track List
No.	Title	Artist	Length
1.	"Laado Badlegi Kahaani"	Asees Kaur	03:04
2.	"Jug Jug Jeeve Tu Laado Meri"		02:01
3.	"Teri Ore"		03:22
4.	"Rabba Mere Rabba"		03:06

== Ratings ==
The series occupied 17th place, with 1.8 TRP ratings in the first week of its launch. In the second week of 2018, the ratings for the series were 1.5. The show reached the 14th position in the BARC ratings on 24 November 2017.

The show was unable to receive adequate ratings and the channel decided to end the show. The show ended on 23 May 2018, completing 133 episodes.
