= Manish Goel =

Indian television actor

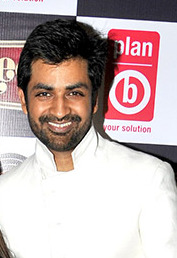
- Goel in September 2015
- Born: August 27, 1975 (age 51); Delhi, India
- Occupation: Actor
- Years active: 1996–2020; 2024–present
- Spouse: Poonam Narula (m. 2002)
- Children: Aryaveer Goel (son); Maliha Goel (daughter)

Manish Goel (born 27 August 1975) is an Indian film and television actor. He was the winner of the reality show Welcome – Baazi Mehmaan Nawazi Ki.

Goel made his television debut with Kahaani Ghar Ghar Kii. He also appeared in reality TV shows, including Zara Nachke Dikha, Welcome – Baazi Mehmaan Nawazi Ki, and BIG Memsaab. He played the lead role of Tilak in Bhabhi on Star Plus.

== Television ==
| Year | Serial | Role | Notes |
|---|---|---|---|
| | Yeh Hai Raaz | | |
| 1996–2000 | Just Mohabbat | | |
| 1998 | CID – Case Of The Thief Within: Part 1 & Part 2 | Karan (Episode 7 & Episode 8) | Episodic Role |
| 1998 | Hip Hip Hurray | Manjeet | |
| 1999–2000 | Bandhan | | |
| 2000 | Thriller At 10 – Kaun: Part 1 to Part 5 | Nikhil Kumar (Episode 31 to Episode 35) | Episodic Role |
| 2000–2002 | Kahaani Ghar Ghar Kii | Tushar | Supporting Role |
| 2001 | Ghar Ek Mandir | R.K. / Ravi | Supporting Role |
| 2001 | Rishtey – Zameer | Rohit Verma (Episode 155) | Episodic Role |
| 2001 | Love Mein Kabhi Kabhi | | Supporting Role |
| 2001 | Dial 100 – Half Ticket: Part 2 to Part 4 | Shekhar Gupta (Episode 26 to Episode 28) | Episodic Role |
| 2001–2003 | Kasautii Zindagii Kay | Anupam Sengupta | Supporting Role |
| 2002 | Mehndi Tere Naam Ki | Aman | Supporting Role |
| 2002–2004; 2004–2006 | Bhabhi | Tilak Chopra | Lead Role |
| 2003–2004 | Saara Akaash | Flight Lieutenant Saurav Singh | Supporting Role |
| 2004 | Devi | Advocate Raj Malhotra | Negative Role |
| 2005 | Kumkum – Ek Pyara Sa Bandhan | Tilak Chopra (Episode 708) | Episodic Role |
| 2006 | Betiyaan Apni Yaa Paraaya Dhan | Vedant | Supporting Role |
| 2007 | Meri Awaz Ko Mil Gayi Roshni | Rehan Kapoor | Supporting Role |
| 2008 | Ajeeb | Anthony | |
| 2011 | Adaalat | Brijesh Rana (Episode 41) | Episodic Role |
| 2013 | SuperCops Vs SuperVillains... Shapath | Dr. Vikram "Sand Man" (Episode 4 & Episode 5) | Episodic Role |
| 2014 | SuperCops Vs SuperVillains... Shapath | Dheer (Episode 69) | Episodic Role |
| 2014 | SuperCops Vs SuperVillains... Shapath | Kaalchakra Dheer (Episode 69) | Episodic Role |
| 2015 | Fear Files – Har Mod Pe Darr | Siddharth Das (Episode 4) | Episodic Role |
| 2015–2016 | Bhagyalakshmi | Yuvraj Malhotra | Negative Role |
| 2017 | Savdhaan India | Mohan Awasthi (Episode 2006) | Episodic Role |
| 2017 | Ayushman Bhava | Vikrant Singhania | Negative Role |
| 2018–2019 | Tantra | Prithvi Khanna | Supporting Role |
| 2019 | Crime Patrol – Dial 100 | Inspector Manish Sinha | Episodic Role |
| 2019–2020 | Nimki Vidhayak | Abhimanyu Rai | Supporting Role |
| 2020 | Hamari Wali Good News | Dr. Raghav Sharma | Cameo Role |
| 2024 | Kyunki... Saas Maa Bahu Beti Hoti Hai | Dheeren Rajgaur | Episodic Role |
| 2025 | Anupamaa | Raghav Singh | Supporting Role |

=== Reality Shows ===
| Year | Show | Role |
|---|---|---|
| 2002 | Chalti Ka Naam Antakshari | Contestant |
| 2005 | Nach Baliye 1 | Contestant |
| 2008 | Say Shava Shava | Contestant |
| 2008 | Ustaadon Ka Ustaad | Contestant |
| 2008 | Zara Nachke Dikha | Contestant |
| 2010 | Mahayatra – Rishton Ka Anokha Safar | Host |
| 2012 | Big Memsaab | Host |
| 2013 | Welcome – Baazi Mehmaan Nawazi Ki | Contestant |
| 2026 | Bigg Boss Season 20 | Contestant - Wild Card |

=== Web Series ===
| Year | Show | Role | Notes | Co–Star |
|---|---|---|---|---|
| 2017 | Love Bytes 2 | Varun | Supporting Role | Shweta Gulati |

=== Music video ===
| Year | Song | Co–Star |
|---|---|---|
| 2000 | Tera Chehra Kitna Suhana | Ritu Shivpuri |

=== Film ===
| Year | Film | Role | Notes | Co–Star |
|---|---|---|---|---|
| 2025 | Hanak | Vikas Dubey | Lead Role | |

=== Short film ===
| Year | Film | Role | Notes | Co–Star |
|---|---|---|---|---|
| 2026 | Azaan | Azaan's Father | Supporting Role | Poonam Narula |

=== Producer ===
| Year | Film |
|---|---|
| 2026 | Azaan |
