= Siddharth Arora =

Indian television actor

- Occupation: Actor
- Years active: 2010–present
- Known for: Doli Armaano Ki

Siddharth Arora is an Indian television actor. He made his television debut with the show Mukti Bandhan on Colors TV. He played Ishaan Sinha in Doli Armaano Ki from 2013 to 2014 and made his Bollywood debut with the movie Yeh Jo Mohabbat Hai in 2012, and also appeared as Beera in Na Bole Tum Na Maine Kuch Kaha 2 on Colors TV. He also starred as Lord Krishna in Krishna Kanhaiya on SAB TV. He has played Shaurya in Colors TV Show Laado – Veerpur Ki Mardani replacing Shaleen Malhotra.

== Career ==
Before entering the industry, he worked with a private bank for two years and then he decided to get into acting. He made his television debut in the show Mukti Bandhan on Colors in 2010 where he played the role of Vaibhav Virani, who is I.M Virani's eldest son and who successfully runs his dad's business but is stubborn and arrogant he always follows his father's instructions in business matters.

He played the role of Beera in Na Bole Tum Na Maine Kuch Kaha (Season 2). His character of Beera which he portrayed was different from what he played in his first Mukti Bandhan played a suave business man. Beera was a rowdy and rural boy. And he secured the leading role in Singhasan Battisi on Sony Pal, show has ended and now continue on SAB TV, with new story of Betaal, and title Betaal Aur Singhasan Battisi. Then he noted for playing Ishan Anirudh Sinha in Doli Armaano Ki in 2013 to 2014.

He essayed the lead role of Shaurya in Colors TV's Laado 2 – Veerpur Ki Mardani opposite. He also played various roles in Sansad TV serial Surajya Sanhita.

== Television ==
Year	Serial	Role	Notes
2011–2012	Mukti Bandhan	Vaibhav Virani	
2013	Na Bole Tum Na Maine Kuch Kaha 2	Veera Tilakdhari	
2013–2014	Doli Armaano Ki	Ishaan Sinha	
2014–2015	Sinhasan Battisi	Maharaj Bhoja	
2015	Betaal Aur Singhasan Battisi	Maharaj Bhoja	
2015	Krishna Kanhaiya	Krishna	
2016	Meri Saasu Maa	Bunty Singh Chauhan	
2018	Laado 2 – Veerpur Ki Mardani	Shaurya Ajmera	
2021–2022	Baal Shiv – Mahadev Ki Andekhi Gatha	Bhagwan Shiva	
2023	Dhruv Tara – Samay Sadi Se Pare	Krishna / Ranchhod	
