= Na Aana Is Des Laado =

- Directed by: Anshuman Kishore Singh
- Country of origin: India
- Original language: Hindi
- No. of seasons: 4
- No. of episodes: 870

Production
- Producer: Shyamashis Bhattacharya
- Camera setup: Multi-camera
- Running time: 20 minutes
- Production company: Shakuntalam Telefilms

Original release
- Network: Colors TV
- Release: 9 March 2009 – 27 July 2012

Related
- Laado 2 - Veerpur Ki Mardani

Na Aana Is Des Laado (lit. Never Come to This Country, Dear Girl) is a 2009 Indian Hindi-language soap opera that premiered on 9 March 2009 on Colors TV and finished on 27 July 2012, reaching a total of 870 episodes. The show portrays various social evils practiced in India. It is sixth longest-running Indian television series of Colors TV. A sequel series titled Laado 2 - Veerpur Ki Mardani premiered on Colors TV in 2017.

== Series overview ==
Season	No. of episodes	Originally broadcast (India)	
Season	No. of episodes	Series premiere	Series finale
1	870	9 March 2009	27 July 2012
2	133	6 November 2017	23 May 2018

== Plot ==
Veerpur, is a village that still practices female infanticide. Bhagwani Devi, the Sarpanch of Veerpur forbids females birth by any of her servants or daughters-in-law or the woman of Veerpur. Sia Singh stands against her. To silence Sia, Ammaji uses her son Raghav to woo and wed her. But he falls in love with and supports Sia against Ammaji. Other pregnant women in Veerpur try to escape. Raghav and Sia save a number of female infants.

Sia becomes the Sarpanch, as she is voted from majority of female population in Veerpur. Ammaji's real daughter Amba, enters and unites with Ammaji who turns Raghav and Sia out. They return when Sia is pregnant in spite of Ammaji's attempts to terminate her pregnancy. As later Ammaji's old enemy Bhanupratap attacks, Sia dies while delivering twin girls, Dia and Jahnvi. Raghav dies in a fire. The twins separate—Dia lives with Ammaji and Jahnvi with Amba.

=== 18–21 years later ===
Set now in Delhi, the well known Ammaji still brings Veerpur cultures there. Dia and Jahnvi meet in college and become friends. Amba dies during an attempt to save Dia, a witness in a court case, after revealing the twins' secret. Eventually, Ammaji accepts Jahnvi. Dia falls in love with and marries Bhanupratap's son Shaurya. Bhanupratap kidnaps Ammaji who later kills him, and this Shaurya leaves Dia. They return to Veerpur.

Ammaji strives to save Jahnvi from a new cruel Sarpanch, Rana Rantej who orders her to marry his sons. Among them, Jahnvi only accepts Surya, who falls in love with her. Rana conspires against Veerpur, but after Jahnvi exposes him, he dies while trying to cover his loss. Ammaji gets involved with corrupt politicians and Dia takes her place and dies. Surya's brother Param kills him to avenge Rana's death. Jahnvi falls into depression.

Dejected and reformed, Ammaji renounces everything and hands over her powers to Jahnvi, who becomes stronger than before and saves all. The serial ends as Ammaji plays with little girls in Veerpur and Jahnvi ruling as the new Ammaji.

== Cast ==
=== Main ===
- Meghna Malik as Bhagwani "Ammaji" Devi Sangwan: Ramveer's widow; Joginder, Gajendar, Raghav and Amba's mother; Aditya, Diya and Jahnvi's grandmother (2009–2012)
- Natasha Sharma as Siya Sangwan: Devi's daughter in law; Vaidehi's sister; Raghav's wife; Diya and Jahnvi's mother (2009–2010)
- Aditya Redij as Raghav Sangwan: Ammaji and Ramveer's youngest son; Joginder, Gajendar and Amba's brother; Siya's husband; Diya and Jahnvi's father (2009–2010)
- Simran Kaur as Diya Sangwan: Siya and Raghav's daughter; Jahnvi's twin sister; Shaurya's ex-wife (2010–2012)
- Varun Kapoor as Shaurya Pratapsingh: Bhanu's son; Diya's ex-husband (2010–2011)
- Vaishnavi Dhanraj as Jahnvi Singh: Siya and Raghav's daughter; Dia's sister; Amba's adoptive daughter; Surya's wife; Kuldeep and Param's ex-wife (2010–2012)
- Kapil Nirmal as Surya Singh Rana: Shivlaali and Rantej's second son; Kuldeep and Param's brother; Jhanvi's husband (2011–2012)
- Lankesh Bhardwaj as Kishanlal: Ranntej Singh tells Kishanlal to terminate his wife's pregnancy and he tried to murder Kishanlal's wife and his baby daughter. Ammaji protect him from Rana unfortunately she does not save his wife, she died at the time of birth of baby girl of Kishanlal, due to this Kishanlal breakdowns (2011–2012)

=== Recurring ===
- Shresth Kumar as Aditya Sangwan: Sunehri and Gajendar's son; Tanisha's ex-fiancé; Ragini's husband; Durga's father (2010–2012)
- Aman Verma as Bhanu Pratapsingh: Bajri's brother; Shaurya's father; Ammaji's enemy (2010–2011)
- Shikha Singh as Amba Sangwan: Ammaji and Ramveer's daughter; Joginder, Gajendar and Raghav's sister; Jhanvi's adoptive mother (2010–2011)
- Lankesh Bhardwaj as Kishan Lal (previous known as Sanjay Bhardwaj)
- Avantika Shetty as Ragini Sangwan: Aditya's wife (2010–2012)
- Madhurjeet Sarghi as Santosh Chautala: Joginder's ex-wife; Vijay's second wife; Karan's mother (2009–2011)
- Rinku Vohra as Chanda Sangwan: Avtar's second wife; Rajbeer's mother (2009–2012)
- Aryan Pandit as Rajbeer Sangwan: Chanda and Avtar's son (2010–2012)
- Nishant Shokeen as Vijay Chautala: Neelu's widower; Santosh's second husband; Sarah and Karan's father (2010–2011)
- Yash Dasgupta as Karan Chautala: Santosh and Vijay's son; Sarah's half-brother; Tanisha's husband (2010–2011)
- Neelam Bhagchandani/Rishina Kandhari as Tanisha Chautala: Aditya's ex-fiancé; Karan's wife; Durga's mother (2010–2011)
- Winy Tripathi as Inspector Vikram Singh: Diya's ex-fiancé
- Rakesh Sharma as Yashpal Rao: Ammaji's right-hand man and bodyguard
- Ankita Maheshwari as Sarah Chautala: Neelu and Vijay's daughter; Karan's half-sister (2010–2011)
- Harish Verma as Avtar Sangwan: Sheela and Dharamveer's son; Jhumar's brother; Rangeeli's former husband; Chanda's husband; Rajbeer's father (2009–2010)
- Tarun Anand/Nisar Khan as Joginder Sangwan: Ammaji and Ramveer's eldest son; Gajendar, Raghav and Amba's brother; Santosh's former husband (2009–2010)
- Shivangi Sharma as Sunehri Sangwan: Gajendar's wife; Aditya's mother; Durga's grandmother (2009–2010)
- Anand Goradia as Gajendar Sangwan: Ammaji and Ramveer's second son; Joginder, Raghav and Amba's brother; Sunehri's husband; Aditya's father; Durga's grandfather (2009–2010)
- Shaikha Parween as Jhumar Sangwan: Sheela and Dharamveer's daughter; Avtar's sister (2009–2010)
- Sonal Jha as Sheela Sangwan: Dharamveer's wife; Avtar and Jhumar's mother; Rajbeer's grandmother (2009–2010)
- Kannan Arunachalam as Dharamveer Sangwan: Ramveer's brother; Sheela's husband; Avtar and Jhumar's father; Rajbeer's grandfather (2009–2010)
- Shabana Mullani as Bulbul Singh: Rana Rantej's second wife (2011–2012)
- Sheeba Chaddha as Bajri Pratapsingh: Bhanu's sister (2010–2011)
- Sharmilee Raj as Nandini Verma: Dharamveer's mistress
- Menaka Lalwani as Rangeeli Sangwan: Avtar's ex-wife
- Ayam Mehta as Rantej Singh Rana: Shivlaali and Bulbul's husband; Kuldeep, Surya and Param's father; Ammaji's enemy (2011–2012)
- Lankesh Bhardwaj as Kishanlal: Rantej Singh Rana tells Kishanlal to terminate his wife's pregnancy if it is a girl and tried to murder his wife and his baby daughter, with the help of his goon, but Ammaji protect him from Rana unfortunately she does not save his wife, she died at the time of birth of baby girl of Kishanlal, due to this Kishanlal breakdowns (2011–2012)
- Anil Lalwani as Kuldeep Singh Rana: Shivlaali and Rantej's eldest son; Surya and Param's brother; Jhanvi's ex-husband (2011–2012)
- Deepraj Rana as Dhanraj Kumar "DK" Vora: Corrupt and characterless DM of Veerpur
- Pratik Mitra as Chamkila
- Shobhit Attray as Paramveer "Param" Singh Rana: Shivlaali and Rantej's youngest son; Surya and Kuldeep's brother; Jhanvi's ex husband (2011–2012)
- Dhruv Lather as Dheeraj Singh: Jhumar's ex-lover
- Rahul Singh as Satpal Rathod: Rana Rantej's right hand man
- Deeya Chopra as Sonali: Raghav's ex-fiancé (2009)
- Janvi Sangwan as Shivlaali Singh Rana: Rantej's first wife; Kuldeep, Surya and Param's mother (2011)
- Deepak Sandhu as Raj
- Vikas Shrivastav/Bhavin Wadia as Shera: Amba's right-hand man
- Rocky Verma as Contract Killer
- Reema Vohra as Vaidehi Singh: Devilal's daughter; Siya's sister (2009–2010)
- Shahab Khan as Dr. Devilal "Devi" Singh: Sia and Vaidehi's father; Diya and Jahnvi's grandfather (2009–2010)
- Suraj Jadhav as lead pehelwan
- Aabhaas Mehta
- Shweta Dadhich as Sunita (Dead)
- Darshan Kumar as constable Chandiram
- Nehalaxmi Iyer as Gunja
- Mahhi Vij as Nakusha

== Reception ==
In week of 17 October 2009, It occupied top position with 7 TVR.

In week of 23 January 2010, It garnered highest weekly of 7.70 TVR.

== Broadcast ==
Na Aana Is Des Laado was dubbed in Tamil as கருத்தம்மா and broadcast on Raj TV and also in Telugu as Naadi Adajanme in Maa TV. The show started in Serbia on RTV Pink with the name Neželjene on 17 December 2012 but was not finished. It also aired on Dangal and Rishtey.

Bosnia and Herzegovina on OBN TV at 2014 as Neželjene.
