= Nishant Shokeen =

Indian film and television actor

- Born: 23 April 1982 (age 44); Nangloi, Delhi, India
- Occupation: Actor

Nishant Shokeen is an Indian film and television actor. He has done several commercial advertisements and television serials. Nishant is currently portraying the role of Lord Krishna in the second season of Zee TV serial Choti Bahu.

== Personal life ==
Nishant was born in Nangloi in Delhi. He did his graduation in Arts in Rohtak, Haryana. He never planned to become an actor but he likes to dance and in a way that led him eventually to television. He had joined Shiamak Davar's dance classes for a month in Delhi. Shaimak recognized a good dancer in him and advised Nishant to join him professionally in Mumbai. He joined Shaimak's troop, but soon realized that it was not what he wanted from life. On his friends' advice he subsequently auditioned for roles and entered the glamorous world of television.

== Career ==
His first television show was 'Miss India' which was aired on Doordarshan. He got his second serial from Balaji Telefilms called 'Kitni Mast Hai Zindagi'. Nishant has played varied characters in various serials. He played Dhoti clad simpleton Bhola in Sony's Durgesh Nandinii. He has played an antagonist in NDTV Imagine's Dehleez and a protagonist in STAR Plus's Thodi Si Zameen Thoda Sa Aasmaan. He has also worked with film makers like Balki and Andy (producer of Hrithik Roshan Reliance Mobile Commercial).

== TV serials ==
1. Miss India (film)
2. Kitni Mast Hai Zindagi
3. Kesar
4. K. Street Pali Hill
5. Hum Paanch
6. Thodi Si Zameen Thoda Sa Aasmaan
7. Durgesh Nandinii
8. CID Special Bureau
9. Ssshhhh...Phir Koi Hai (Junoon)
10. Akela (episodic)
11. Yeh Dil Chahe More
12. Simplly Sapney
13. Jai Maa Vaishno Devi
14. Dehleez
15. Bandhan
16. Kahaniya Vikram Aur Betaal Ki
17. Na Aana Is Des Laado
18. Mera Naam Karegi Roshan
19. Baat Hamari Pakki Hai
20. Adaalat
21. Choti Bahu

== TV commercials ==
Nishant's commercial ad work includes: Kaun Banega Crorepati Promo, Breeze Soap, Parle Poppins, Fair One, Kissan Ketchup, Sahara Buniyad Promo, Wheel, Chevrolet Magnum, Hero Honda CD Deluxe with Andy, Iodex, ICICI, Samsung Hero Phone, Aviva Insurance with Sachin Tendulkar, Innova with Aamir Khan etc.
