= Palak Jain (actress, active since 2003) =

Indian actress

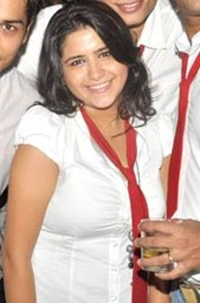
- Jain at the launch party of The Buddy Project in 2012
- Occupation: Actress
- Years active: 2003–present
- Spouse: Tapasvi Mehta (m. 2019)

Palak Jain is an Indian television actress known for roles in television programmes such as Sunaina – Mera Sapna Sach Hua and Veer Shivaji. She portrayed the role of Panchi Rastogi in Channel V India's The Buddy Project, opposite Kunal Jaisingh. She was also a part of the Sony TV serial Itna Karo Na Mujhe Pyar in 2015, followed by Ek Duje Ke Vaaste in 2016. She also played role of Jhanvi in the serial Laado 2.

== Career ==
Jain made her television debut in the Pogo TV drama Sunaina- Mera Sapna Sach Hua, as the protagonist Sunaina Mathur, a teenage girl whose dreams literally come true. She then went on to play Saibai in the historical series, Veer Shivaji opposite her co-star, Paras Arora.

== Filmography ==
=== Television ===
Year	Title	Role
2003	Kaahin Kissii Roz	Aditi Sikand
2003	Kyunki Saas Bhi Kabhi Bahu Thi	Young Shobha
2005-2006	M.A.D	Herself
2008	Sunaina	Sunaina Mathur
2010	Do Hanson Ka Jodaa	Sajni
2011–2012	Veer Shivaji	Maharani Saibai
2012–2014	The Buddy Project	Panchi Rastogi
2014–2015	Itna Karo Na Mujhe Pyar	Suhani Khanna
2016	Ek Duje Ke Vaaste	Young Suman
2017	Laado 2	Jhanvi Sangwan
2018-2019	Lal Ishq	Jhanvi
2018-2019	Kehne Ko Humsafar Hain	Nikki Mehra

=== Films ===
Year	Title	Notes
2003	Tehzeeb	Unnamed
2005	Paheli	Kishan's cousin
2005	Barsaat	Young Kajal
2005	Vaah! Life Ho Toh Aisi!	Palak
2006	Kachchi Sadak	Unnamed
