= Dakssh Ajit Singh =

Indian actor (born 1980)

- Born: 27 March 1980 (age 46); Kurukshetra, Haryana, India
- Occupations: Actor; Fitness Model singer Songwriter; Film Producer
- Years active: 2004–present
- Spouse: Mannat Singh
- Awards: (Nominated) PTC Punjabi Film Awards for Best Story Writing for Arsho.

Dakssh Ajit Singh (born 27 March 1980) is an Indian actor and songwriter. His latest work as "LAADI" in a Netflix series named CAT appreciated globally. Earlier singh had worked in Hindi television shows and Punjabi films. He is mostly noted for his role in the 2011 drama Maryada: Lekin Kab Tak?

== Filmography ==
=== Films ===
| Year | Title | Role | Ref |
|---|---|---|---|
| 2010 | Tere Ishq Nachaya | | |
| 2012 | Rahe Chardi Kala Punjab Di | Dalbir Singh | |
| 2014 | Arsho | Deep | |
| 2023 | White Panjab | | |

=== Web series ===
| Year | Title | Role | Ref |
|---|---|---|---|
| 2022 | CAT | Lakhwinder Singh/Laadi | |

=== Television ===
| Year | Title | Role | Ref |
|---|---|---|---|
| 2010–2012 | Maryada: Lekin Kab Tak? | Gaurav Jakhar | |
| 2012–2013 | Hum Ne Li Hai... Shapath | Senior Inspector Samrat | |
| 2016 | Chakravartin Ashoka Samrat | Acharya Radhagupt | |
| 2017–2018 | Laado 2 | Rantej Balwant Chaudhary | |
| 2019 | Kesari Nandan | Bhairon Singh | |
| 2020 | Akbar Ka Bal Birbal | Trikon | |
| 2015–2016 | Ishq Ka Rang Safed | Tripurari | |
| | Yeh Rishta Kya Kehlata Hai | Inspector Shekhar | |
| 2013–2015 | Bharat Ka Veer Putra – Maharana Pratap | Raj Rana Bahadur | |
| 2011–2013 | Kuch Toh Log Kahenge | Daksh Bharadwaj | |
| | Paramavatar Shri Krishna | Shishupala | |
| | Jamunia | Bali Thakur | |
| | Raja Ki Aayegi Baraat | Baali | |
| | Chaldi Da Naam Gaddi | Parmeet Singh | |

=== Albums ===
- Allah De Bandey
- Jaa
- Friend
- Banjara
- Kiven Dassan Oye
