= Meghna Malik =

Indian actress

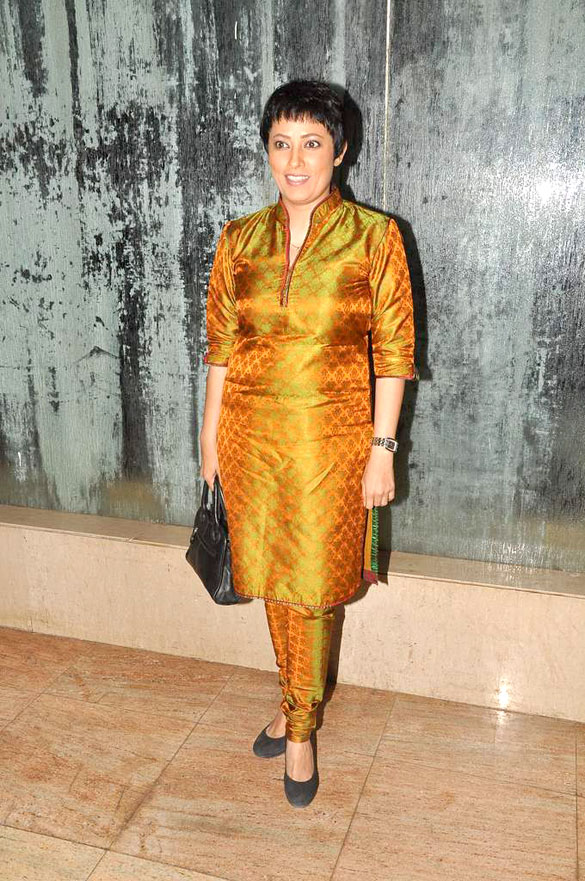
- Born: Sonipat, Haryana, India
- Education: National School of Drama
- Occupations: Film, television and theatre actor
- Years active: 1998–present
- Spouse: Riju Bajaj
- Relatives: Ram Gopal Bajaj (father-in-law)
- Website: meghnamalik.com

Meghna Malik is an Indian actress who appears in Hindi television and films. She is popularly known as the high-handed Ammaji of Colors TV's popular show Na Aana Is Des Laado. The show dealt with the issue of female infanticide and other atrocities against women.

In 2013, Malik became a contestant on Jhalak Dikhhla Jaa. In 2016, she appeared in Star Plus's show Dahleez. In 2017, she reprised her role as Ammaji from Na Aana Is Des Laado in its sequel Laado 2 – Veerpur Ki Mardani, although she quit the show in early 2018.

== Early life and family ==
Malik was born and brought up in Sonipat in a Jat family. Her mother Kamlesh Malik is a retired college principal, while her father Raghuvir Singh Malik (d. 2020) was an English professor. Her younger sister Mimansha is a senior anchor and producer with Zee News. She completed her master's degree in English after which she moved to Delhi, where she did an acting course from the National School of Drama, graduating in 1997. She is a Mumbai resident from 2000.

She married film actor Riju Bajaj, the son of theatre director Ram Gopal Bajaj and maternal grandson of music director Khemchand Prakash, in 2000. Her sister, Mimansa Malik, is a television news anchor and journalist.

== Career ==
Malik played the leading role of Ammaji in television series Na Aana Is Des Laado (2009–2012). She also had supporting roles in several movies, including Chalte Chalte, Kuch Naa Kaho, and Taare Zameen Par.

In 2017, she was signed up to reprise her role as Ammaji in Laado 2. She quits the show in 2018, while the show went off air the same year.

== Filmography ==
=== Television ===
| Year | Show | Role | Notes |
|---|---|---|---|
| 2006 | Woh Hue Na Hamare | Bua Ji | Negative role |
| 2001 | Yeh Hai Mumbai Meri Jaan | | |
| 2001 | Astitva...Ek Prem Kahani | | |
| 2002 | Sanjivani | Nalini- A patient | |
| 2007–2008 | Ssshhhh...Phir Koi Hai | Unknown | [Episode 29 - Daayan Bani Dulhan] |
| 2007–2008 | Har Ghar Kuch Kehta Hai | Suvarna Thakral | |
| 2007–2008 | Radhaa Ki Betiyaan Kuch Kar Dikhayengi | Revati | |
| 2009–2012 | Na Aana Is Des Laado | Bhagwani Devi / Ammaji Sangwan | |
| | Kitchen Champion | Ammaji / Herself | Winner |
| 2013 | Jhalak Dikhhla Jaa 6 | Contestant | With choreographer Savio Barnes Eliminated on 22 June 2013 |
| 2013–2014 | Gustakh Dil | Barkha | |
| 2016 | Dahleez | Advocate Suhasini Sinha | |
| 2017 | Bigg Boss 11 | Guest | Guest for the promotion of Laado 2 – Veerpur Ki Mardani |
| 2017–2018 | Laado 2 – Veerpur Ki Mardani | Bhagwani Devi / Ammaji Sangwan | |

=== Films ===
| Year | Film | Role | Language | Notes |
|---|---|---|---|---|
| 2003 | Chalte Chalte | Farah | Hindi | |
| 2003 | Pinjar | | Hindi | |
| 2003 | Kuch Na Kaho | Nikki | Hindi | |
| 2004 | Vaastu Shastra | | Hindi | |
| 2006 | Yun Hota Toh Kya Hota | Kalpa | Hindi | |
| 2007 | Taare Zameen Par | Maths Teacher | Hindi | |
| 2016 | Zubaan | Mandira Sikand | Hindi, Punjabi | |
| 2018 | Moksha to Maya | Police Officer | | |
| 2019 | Sehar | | Hindi | |
| 2019 | Pal Pal Dil Ke Paas | Ratna Narang | Hindi | |
| 2020 | Angrezi Medium | Principal | Hindi | |
| 2021 | Saina | Usha Rani Nehwal | Hindi | |
| 2021 | Pagglait | Tulika | Hindi | Netflix |
| 2022 | Anek | Reporter | Hindi | Netflix |
| 2023 | Selfiee | Corporator Vimla Tiwari | Hindi | |
| 2023 | Tumse Na Ho Payega | Anu | Hindi | Hotstar |
| 2024 | Tera Kya Hoga Lovely | | Hindi | |
| 2025 | Heer Express | Sunita | Hindi | |
| 2026 | Mirzapur | Shakuntala Shukla | Hindi | |

=== Web series ===
| Year | Name | Role | Notes |
|---|---|---|---|
| 2020 / 2024 | Bandish Bandits | Avantika (Mother of Tamanna) | Season 1 & 2 |
| 2022-2024 | Mirzapur | Shakuntala Shukla | Season 2-Season 3 |
| 2021 | Aranyak | Jagdamba Dhumal | Netflix |
| 2025 | Rangeen | Renu | Prime Video |
| 2026 | Sankalp | Suhasini | MX Player |
| 2026 | Brown | Nonnie Jaiswal | ZEE5 |

== Awards ==
- 2010: Gold Awards - Best Actress in Negative Role (Female) - Na Aana Is Des Laado
- 2022 : 67th Filmfare Awards – Best Supporting Actress Saina (Nominated)
