= Inspire Films =

Indian television production company

- Industry: Entertainment
- Founded: 2007
- Headquarters: Mumbai, India
- Key people: Yash A Patnaik; Mamta Yash Patnaik
- Products: Television programs, Films
- Website: Official website

Inspire Films Private Limited is a television content company under Beyond Dreams Entertainment Private Limited. The company has produced shows including Ek Veer Ki Ardaas...Veera, Sadda Haq, Kuch Rang Pyar Ke Aise Bhi, and Ishq Mein Marjawan.

== Former productions ==
Year	Show	Production	Notes	Ref (s)
2008–2010	Cambala Investigation Agency	Produced Under Beyond Dream Entertainment		
2008	Neijare Megha Mote	Produced Under Beyond Dream Entertainment	Odia show	
2009	Chehra	Co-Produced With Beyond Dream Entertainment		
2009	Vachana Dile Tu Mala	Produced Under Beyond Dream Entertainment	Marathi show	
2009	Monica Mogre	Produced Under Beyond Dream Entertainment	Crime Drama	
2010–2011	Rang Badalti Odhani	Produced Under Beyond Dream Entertainment	Love drama	
2010	Jamunia	Produced Under Beyond Dream Entertainment	Rural life drama	
2012–2013	Junoon – Aisi Nafrat Toh Kaisa Ishq	Produced Under Beyond Dream Entertainment		
2012–2015	Ek Veer Ki Ardaas...Veera	Produced Under Beyond Dream Entertainment		
2013–2014	Beintehaa			
2013–2014	Main Naa Bhoolungi	Produced By Beyond Dream Entertainment and Dancing Waters		
2013–2016	Sadda Haq	Co-Produced With Beyond Dream Entertainment		
2014	Million Dollar Girl			
2015	Twistwala Love		Love stories	
2015	Secret Diaries			
2016–2017	Kuch Rang Pyar Ke Aise Bhi	Produced Under Beyond Dream Entertainment		
2016–2017	Jaana Na Dil Se Door	Co-Produced With Beyond Dream Entertainment		
2016–2017	Naagarjuna – Ek Yoddha			
2017–2019	Ishq Mein Marjawan	Co-Produced With Beyond Dream Entertainment		
2019–2020	Chocolate (Malayalam TV series)	Malayalam serial aired on Surya TV		
2020–2021	Ishq Mein Marjawan 2	Co-Produced With Beyond Dream Entertainment		
2021	Ishq Mein Marjawan 2: Naya Safar	Co-Produced With Beyond Dream Entertainment	Web Series	
2021	Kuch Rang Pyar Ke Aise Bhi: Nayi Kahaani	Co-Produced With Beyond Dream Entertainment		
2021–2022	Rakshabandhan... Rasal Apne Bhai Ki Dhal	Co-Produced With Beyond Dream Entertainment		
2022	Channa Mereya	Co-Produced With Beyond Dream Entertainment		
2022	Control Room	Co-Produced With Beyond Dream Entertainment		
2023	Dear Ishq	Co-Produced With Beyond Dream Entertainment		
2023	Tere Ishq Mein Ghayal	Co-Produced With Beyond Dream Entertainment		
2023	Baazi Ishq Ki	Co-Produced With Beyond Dream Entertainment		
2023	Gauna – Ek Pratha	Co-Produced With Beyond Dream Entertainment		
2025	Dhaakad Beera	Co-Produced With Beyond Dream Entertainment		
