= Kyunki Papa Kehte Hain =

Indian Sitcom television series

- Genre: Sitcom
- Created by: Yash A Patnaik
- Directed by: Dharmesh Mehta
- Starring: Raj Anadkat; Saachi Tiwari; Asmi Deo; Lavish Chauhan; Divya Sharma; Kavish Khunger
- Country of origin: India
- Original language: Hindi
- No. of episodes: 40

Production
- Producers: Yash A Patnaik; Mamta Patnaik
- Camera setup: Multi-camera
- Running time: 20–25 minutes
- Production companies: Beyond Dreams Entertainment; Inspire Films Private Limited

Original release
- Network: Sony SAB
- Release: 22 September 2026 – present

Related
- Party Of Five

Kyunki Papa Kehte Hain is an Indian teen and Comedy television series created by Yash A Patnaik and Mamta Patnaik that is seen on Sony SAB from 22nd September 2026. The series features Raj Anadkat and Saachi Tiwari in lead roles. It is an official Hindi adaptation of American series Party Of Five.

== Cast ==
=== Main ===
- Raj Anadkat as Pawan Parekh - Anmol and Revati's eldest son; Prithvi, Jharna, Atisha and Amber's brother (2026–present)
- Saachi Tiwari as Simran Mehra - Balbeer's daughter (2026–present)
- Lavish Chauhan as Prithvi Parekh - Anmol and Revati's second son; Pawan, Jharna, Atisha and Amber's brother (2026–present)
- Divya Sharma as Jharna Parekh - Anmol and Revati's elder daughter; Pawan, Prithvi, Atisha and Amber's sister (2026–present)
- Asmi Deo as Atisha Parekh - Anmol and Revati's younger daughter; Pawan, Prithvi, Jharna and Amber's sister (2026–present)
- Kavish Khunger as Amber Parekh - Anmol and Revati's youngest son; Pawan, Prithvi, Jharna and Atisha's brother (2026–present)

=== Recurring ===
- Amit Soni as Anmol Parekh - Ratan and Madhavi's brother; Revati's husband; Pawan, Prithvi, Jharna, Atisha and Amber's father (2026)
- Shriya Jha as Revati Parekh - Anmol's wife; Pawan, Prithvi, Jharna, Atisha and Amber's mother (2026)
- Rajesh Balwani as Ratan Parekh - Anmol and Madhavi's brother; Bijal's husband; Lakshya and Vedika's father (2026-present)
- Purvi Mehta as Bijal Parekh: Ratan's wife; Lakshya and Vedika's mother (2026-present)
- Moheet Chauhan as Lakshya "Lakhu" Parekh - Ratan and Bijal's son; Vedika's brother (2026-present)
- Hetvi Sharma as Vedika Parekh - Ratan and Bijal's daughter; Lakshya's sister (2026-present)
- Bhavisha M as Madhavi Parekh - Anmol and Ratan's sister (2026-present)
- Archana Dani as Aruna Tai - Revali Chai Shop's worker (2026-present)
- Swapnesh Shrivastava as Jassi - Pawan's friend (2026-present)
- Tanvi Sawant as Avni - Pawan's ex-girlfriend (2026)
- Nimesh Soni as Ketan: A fraudster (2026)
- Tushar Jha as Rocky: A model photographer (2026)

== Production ==
=== Development ===
Kyunki Papa Kehte Hain was announced by Sony SAB in August 2026. The show is produced by Yash Patnaik and Mamta Patnaik under the banner of Inspire Films.

=== Casting ===
Initially, Avinash Mishra was cast to play the main lead but due to production delays, he was replaced by Raj Andakat marking his return after 4 years. While, initially Khushi Dubey was cast as female lead, but in September 2026, she was also replaced by Saachi Tiwari. Lavish Chauhan was cast as Prithvi Parekh. Child actor Asmi Deo was cast as Atisha.
