= ITA Award for Best Actor in a Negative Role =

Indian Television Academy award

- Awarded for: Best Performance by a male actor in a Negative Role on Television
- Country: India
- First award: Makrand Deshpande for CID (2005)
- Currently held by: Nikitin Dheer for Shrimad Ramayan (2024)
- Website: Indian Television Academy Awards

ITA Award for Best Actor in a Negative Role is an award given by Indian Television Academy Awards for TV serials, to recognize a male actor who has delivered an outstanding performance in a negative role, that is in the role of an antagonist.

== Winners ==
Year	Actor	Character	Show	Ref
2005	Makarand Deshpande	Maneater	C.I.D.	
2006	Aman Verma	Rishabh Lamba	Virasaat	
2007	Rajesh Khattar	Kishan Katara	Kumkum – Ek Pyara Sa Bandhan	
2008	Mukul Dev	Pulkit	Kumkum – Ek Pyara Sa Bandhan	
2009	Sudesh Berry	Loha Singh	Agle Janam Mohe Bitiya Hi Kijo	
2010	Anupam Shyam	Thakur Sajjan Singh	Mann Kee Awaaz Pratigya	
2011	Shiv Kumar Subramaniam	I.M. Virani	Mukti Bandhan	
2012	Karanvir Bohra	Viraj Dobriyal	Dil Se Di Dua... Saubhagyavati Bhava?	
2013	Mohit Raina	Jalandhara	Devon Ke Dev...Mahadev	
2014	Ayub Khan	Rajnath Goenka	Ek Hasina Thi	
2015	Mohit Malik	Samrat Singh Rathore	Doli Armaano Ki	
2016	Vineet Kumar	Kailash Kashyap	Jaana Na Dil Se Door	
2017	Denzil Smith	Rashid Jamal	P.O.W.- Bandi Yuddh Ke	
2018	Aamir Dalvi	Zafar	Aladdin - Naam Toh Suna Hoga	
2019	Manish Wadhwa	Kans	Paramavatar Shri Krishna	
2020	Not awarded			
2021	Vaibhav Mangle	Kulkarni Sarkar	Mere Sai	
2022	Shakti Anand	Amber Singh	Channa Mereya	
2023	Rakesh Paul	Yogesh Mehra	Na Umra Ki Seema Ho	
2024	Nikitin Dheer	Ravan	Shrimad Ramayan	
