= Yash A Patnaik =

Indian television producer

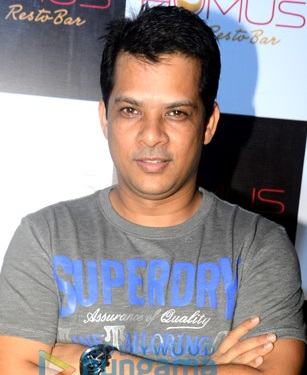
- Yash Patnaik
- Born: Yash A Patnaik; 12 March 1974 (age 52); Bhubaneshwar, Odisha, India
- Occupations: Producer, Journalist, Screenwriter
- Years active: 2005–present
- Spouse: Mamta Patnaik (m. 2002)
- Children: 1

Yash A Patnaik (born 12 March 1974) is an Indian television and film producer and screenwriter.

He founded Indian media company Beyond Dreams Entertainment in 2007 along with his writer wife Mamta Yash A Patnaik.

Under the banner of Beyond Dreams Entertainment he has produced many television shows and films. Among the TV shows produced by him are Ek Veer Ki Ardaas...Veera, Sadda Haq, Kuch Rang Pyar Ke Aise Bhi, Ishq Mein Marjawan to name a few.

== Early life and career ==
Yash A Patnaik was born on 12 March 1974 in Bhubaneswar, Odisha, India. Patnaik did political science from Ravenshaw University and did his graduation from Symbiosis Institute of Journalism and Communications, Pune. He started his career as a journalist for print as well as electronic media and then went on to work with leading production houses and television channels. He then moved to Mumbai and worked as a journalist for quite some time before joining TV software production company Fireworks Productions. With Fireworks he worked as an executive producer for CID and Achanak 37 Saal Baad. After working with Fireworks for a period of seven years, Patnaik moved out in 2006.

In 2007 Patnaik started his own production house Beyond Dreams Entertainment, with his wife Mamta Patnaik. Under Beyond Dreams Patnaik produced shows for almost all Hindi GEC's and also for the regional television channel Star Pravah and Pogo TV, the entertainment channel for kids. The shows produced by Patnaik under Beyond Dreams Entertainment and Inspire Films are Cambala Investigation Agency (2008), Chehra (TV series) (2009), Monica Mogre (2009), Rang Badalti Odhani (2010-2011), Jamunia (2010), Junoon – Aisi Nafrat Toh Kaisa Ishq (2012-2013), Ek Veer Ki Ardaas...Veera (2012-2015), Main Naa Bhoolungi (2014), Sadda Haq (2013-2016), Twistwala Love (2015), Million Dollar Girl (2014), Secret Diaries (2015), Kuch Rang Pyar Ke Aise Bhi (2016–present), Jaana Na Dil Se Door (2016–present) and Naagarjuna – Ek Yoddha (2016-2017). Patnaik has also produced regional shows like Vachana Dile Tu Mala (2009) on Star Pravah and Neijare Megha Mote (2008) on Tarang TV .In 2017 he also produced a show Ishq Mein Marjawan whose story is developed by his wife Mamta Yash Patnaik and show airs on colors TV and gained popularity with a small time of its release.

Patnaik produced a day horror film Kaalo, in 2010 based on centuries-old folktale about a desert witch. Kaalo is the only Indian horror film which has received Best Film in an international film festival (Best Film and Best Cinematography awards at South Africa Horrorfest 2010, Cape Town). Patnaik has worked as a screenwriter in the 2011 Indian film Ra.One.

== Filmography ==
=== Television ===
==== As a producer ====
Year	Show	Notes	Ref (s)
2007–2009	Cambala Investigation Agency		
2008	Neijare Megha Mote	Odia show	
2009	Chehra		
2009	Vachana Dile Tu Mala	Marathi show	
2009	Monica Mogre	Crime drama	
2010–2011	Rang Badalti Odhani	Love drama	
2010	Jamunia	Rural life drama	
2012–2013	Junoon – Aisi Nafrat Toh Kaisa Ishq		
2012–2015	Ek Veer Ki Ardaas...Veera		
2013–2014	Beintehaa		
2013–2014	Main Naa Bhoolungi		
2013–2016	Sadda Haq	Youth show	
2014	Million Dollar Girl	Youth show	
2015	Twistwala Love	Youth show	
2015	Secret Diaries	Youth show	
2016–2017	Kuch Rang Pyar Ke Aise Bhi		
2016–2017	Jaana Na Dil Se Door		
2016–2017	Naagarjuna – Ek Yoddha		
2017–2019	Ishq Mein Marjawan		
2020–2021	Ishq Mein Marjawan 2		
2021	Kuch Rang Pyar Ke Aise Bhi: Nayi Kahaani		
2022	Channa Mereya	Love drama	
2023	Dear Ishq	Romance drama	
2023	Baazi Ishq Ki	Romance drama suspense	
2023	Gauna Ek Pratha	Drama	
2025	Dhaakad Beera	Drama	
2026–present	Kyunki Papa Kehte Hain	Comedy	

=== Films ===
- Kaalo (2010) as Producer
- Ra.One (2011) as Screenwriter
