= Tere Ishq Mein Ghayal =

Indian supernatural horror television series

- Genre: Supernatural Horror; Fantasy; Romance; Thriller
- Created by: Yash A Patnaik
- Starring: See below
- Opening theme: Ishq Mein Hua Ghayal...Ghayal!
- Composers: Reenam Jain, Aashish Rego
- Country of origin: India
- Original language: Hindi
- No. of seasons: 1
- No. of episodes: 89

Production
- Producers: Yash A Patnaik; Mamta Patnaik
- Running time: 21-63 minutes
- Production companies: Beyond Dreams Entertainment; Inspire Films

Original release
- Network: Colors TV; JioCinema
- Release: 13 February – 12 July 2023

Tere Ishq Mein Ghayal (transl. Wounded in Your Love) is an Indian Hindi-language supernatural fantasy television series that aired from 13 February 2023 to 9 June 2023 on Colors TV. From 12 June 2023 to 12 July 2023, the show exclusively streamed on JioCinema. An adaptation of The Vampire Diaries, produced by Yash A Patnaik and Mamta Patnaik under the banner of Beyond Dreams Entertainment and Inspire Films, it stars Karan Kundrra, Gashmeer Mahajani and Reem Shaikh in main roles respectively.

== Plot ==
Many years ago, Avantika plead to her werewolf lover Tej to make her a werewolf like him, so they could be together, to which Tej refused. Eventually Tej was shot and killed. Avantika vowed that someday a lover would come to fulfill their incomplete love story.

Years later, Eisha Sharma, is still grieving from the loss of her parents. She met Armaan Oberoi, a werewolf. Eisha felt a connection between her and Armaan. Armaan's brother Veer, also a werewolf, wanted Eisha as she looked exactly like his lover Kavya, also a werewolf, who was burned to death by a villager. Armaan wanted Eisha as he is in love with her. Whereas Veer wants Eisha to take revenge on Armaan, as he believes Armaan is the reason for Kavya's death.

== Cast ==
=== Main ===
- Gashmeer Mahajani as Armaan Oberoi: A 123 year old werewolf turned by Kavya; Veer's brother; Daksh and Raima's half-brother; Sikander’s step-brother; Tina's best friend; Eisha's ex-boyfriend (2023) (Dead)
- Reem Shaikh as
  - Eisha Sharma: Sudha and Vyom's daughter; Angira, Viaan's cousin and adoptive sister; Laksh and Armaan's ex-girlfriend; Veer's girlfriend; Mehek and Cherry's best friend; Amar Sharma's descendant. (2023)
  - Kavya: A 500+ year old werewolf who manipulated both Armaan and Veer to be her lovers for her own benefit; Eisha and Sudha's ancestor (2023)
- Karan Kundrra as Veer Oberoi: A 122 year old werewolf turned by Armaan; Armaan's brother; Daksh and Raima's half-brother; Sikander’s step-brother; Kavya's former love interest; Eisha's boyfriend (2023)

=== Recurring ===
- Rrahul Sudhir as Sikandar: Daksh and Raima's half-brother; Armaan and Veer's step-brother (2023) (Dead)
- Pooja Singh as Malini: Eisha's adoptive aunt; Vihaan's aunt; Sameer's love interest (2023) (Dead)
- Kunal Khosla as Vihaan Sharma: Eisha's cousin; Sara and Ahana's former love-interest; Amar Sharma's descendant; Mehek's boyfriend (2023)
- Vaishnavi Dhanraj as Mehek Roy: A Yogini; Eisha's childhood best friend; Arundhti's granddaughter; Cherry, Lakshya, Sara, Armaan, Veer and Maahir's friend; Chandrika's great-granddaughter; Vihaan's girlfriend (2023)
- Nalini Negi as Cherry Diwaan - Eisha and Mehek's best friend; Maaya's daughter; Lakshay's ex-girlfriend; Sara and Vihaan's friend; a werewolf turned by Kavya; Mahir's girlfriend (2023)
- Vishal Nayak / Ayub Khan as Vikram Oberoi - Armaan and Veer's father (2023) (Flashback)
- Priya Bathija as Mrs. Oberoi - Vikram's wife; Armaan and Veer's mother (2023)
- Nimai Bali as Mayor Kumar Damania: A Mahishi; Taruneema's husband; Mahir's father; Maya's friend (2023) (Dead)
- Smriti Tarun Khanna as Taruneema Kumar Damania: Mayor's wife; Mahir's mother (2023)
- Nidhi Shetty as Sara - A normal girl who gets turned into a werewolf by Veer; Lakshya's sister; Viaan's ex-love interest; Anita's daughter (2023)(Dead)
- Prabhat Chaudhary as Lakshya - Sara's brother; Mehek, Maahir and Viaan's friend; Eisha and Cherry's ex-boyfriend; Anita's son (2023)
- Pratik Parihar as Vicky - A werewolf turned by Ahana; Mehek's love interest later killed by Armaan (2023)(Dead/Cameo Role)
- Roma Navani as ACP Maaya Diwaan - A police officer; Cherry's mother; Mayor's friend (2023)
- Kavita Vaish as Arundhati Roy - A Yogini; Mehek's grandmother; Chandrika's granddaughter (2023)(Dead)
- Gauri Singh - as Izaa, Caretaker of the Oberoi Mansion (2023) (Cameo Role)
- Megha Prasad as Tina - A 350 years old werewolf; Armaan's friend; Kartik's girlfriend (2023) (Dead)
- Meherzan Mazda / Fahad Ali as Mahir Damania: Mayor and Taruneema's son, a Mahish; Cherry's boyfriend (2023) / (2023)
- Nikhil Arya as Sameer Acharya - A new history teacher of Landsale college; Sudha's ex-husband; Eisha's step-father; Malini's love-interest (2023)
- Nidhi Sisodiya as Chandrika Ghosh - A former Yogini and Soul; Arundhti's grandmother; Mehek's ancestor (2023)(Cameo Role)
- Nisha Agarwal as Nikita - A Yogini; Veer's friend (2023)(Cameo Role) (Dead)
- Aditi Rawat as Ahana - Viaan's new love interest; a werewolf (2023) (Dead)
- Gultesham Khan as Kartik - a werewolf; Tina's boyfriend (2023)(Cameo Role)
- Shardul Pandit as Adi: a werewolf turned by Ahana (2023)(Cameo Role)
- Shilpa Saklani as Sudha: Sameer's ex-wife; a werewolf turned by Veer; Eisha's biological mother; Kavya's descendant (2023) (Dead)
- Kamya Panjabi as Nandini: a 400 year-old werewolf; Ahana's mother; Amar Sharma's former love-interest (2023)(Dead)
- Subodh Verma as Amar Sharma: Nandini's former love interest and Eisha and Vihaan's great-grandfather; Vyom's grandfather (2023)(Flashback)
- Navina Bole as Anita: Lakshya and Sara's mother (2023)
- Suchita Sinha as Trisha Gupta: Sudha's friend (2023)(Dead/Cameo)
- Bakhtiyaar Irani as Vyom Sharma: Eisha's biological father & adoptive uncle; Vihaan's uncle; Sudha's ex-Boyfriend; Amar Sharma’s grandson (2023)(Dead)
- Krip Suri as Daksh Oberoi: Raima’s brother; Sikandar, Armaan and Veer's half-brother (2023)
- Ankit Gulati as Bheem, a Mahish (2023)
- Sonam Arora as Mrs. Oberoi: Sikander, Daksh and Raima's mother; Armaan and Veer's step-mother; Vikram Oberoi's First wife (2023)(Dead)
- Rakshita Khanna as Raima Oberoi: Sikander, Armaan and Veer's half-sister; Daksh's Sister; Vikram Oberoi's only daughter, a bhediya (2023)

=== Cameo appearances ===
- Arjun Bijlani as Tej: A werewolf, Avantika's lover; Armaan and Veer's cousin (2023)
- Niyati Fatnani as Avantika: Tej's lover; Cherry' s grandmother; Maya's mother (2023)
- Nia Sharma as Dancer (2023)

== Production ==
=== Casting ===
Karan Kundrra as Veer, Reem Shaikh as Isha and Gashmeer Mahajani as Armaan were signed as the lead.

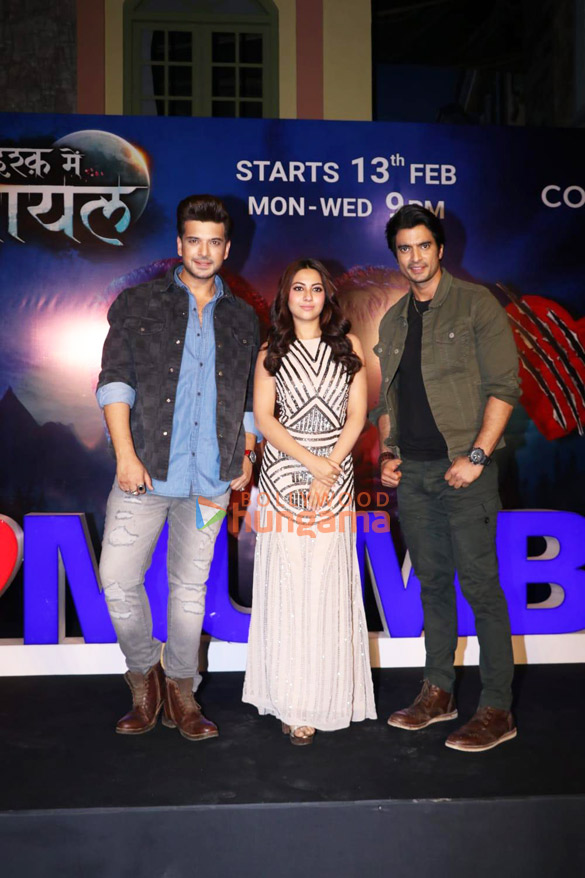
Karan with Reem and Gashmeer snapped on sets

The series also features Arjun Bijlani and Niyati Fatnani in cameo appearances. In May 2023, Rrahul Sudhir to join the show as Sikander Oberoi.

=== Development ===
The series was announced by Beyond Dreams Entertainment and Inspire Films for Colors TV in December 2022. The series is an adaptation of The Vampire Diaries. Initially titled "Bhediya – Ishq Aur Junoon", later changed to "Ishq Mein Ghayal" and launched with the title "Tere Ishq Mein Ghayal". From 12 June 2023, the show exclusively streamed on JioCinema with title ''Tere Ishq Mein Ghayal-Aage Badhayenge Ishq Ki Dastaan'' .

=== Filming ===
In December 2022, principal photography commenced in Dehradun, with some initial sequences shot at Forest Research Institute.

== Reception ==
India Today noted its poor makeup and VFX and stated that "There should have been an eerie aura attached to the plot, but honestly, the fight scenes as well as the shapeshifting scenes gave us the laughs, thanks to poor VFX." but also noted that "If there was someone who actually went beyond and gave a great performance, it was Karan Kundrra. He was simply realistic and we loved watching him." Mid-day - Gashmeer Mahajani and Reem Sameer Sheikh make an honest effort to elevate the script with their performances; While Mahajani doesn’t manage to ace the semi-transformation (where only their eyes and facial expressions change), he is spot-on in the emotional "scenes"

The series was reviewed by Gursimran Kaur Banga for The Times of India.

== See also ==
- List of programmes broadcast by Colors TV
