= Puneett Chouksey =

Indian television actor (born 1991)

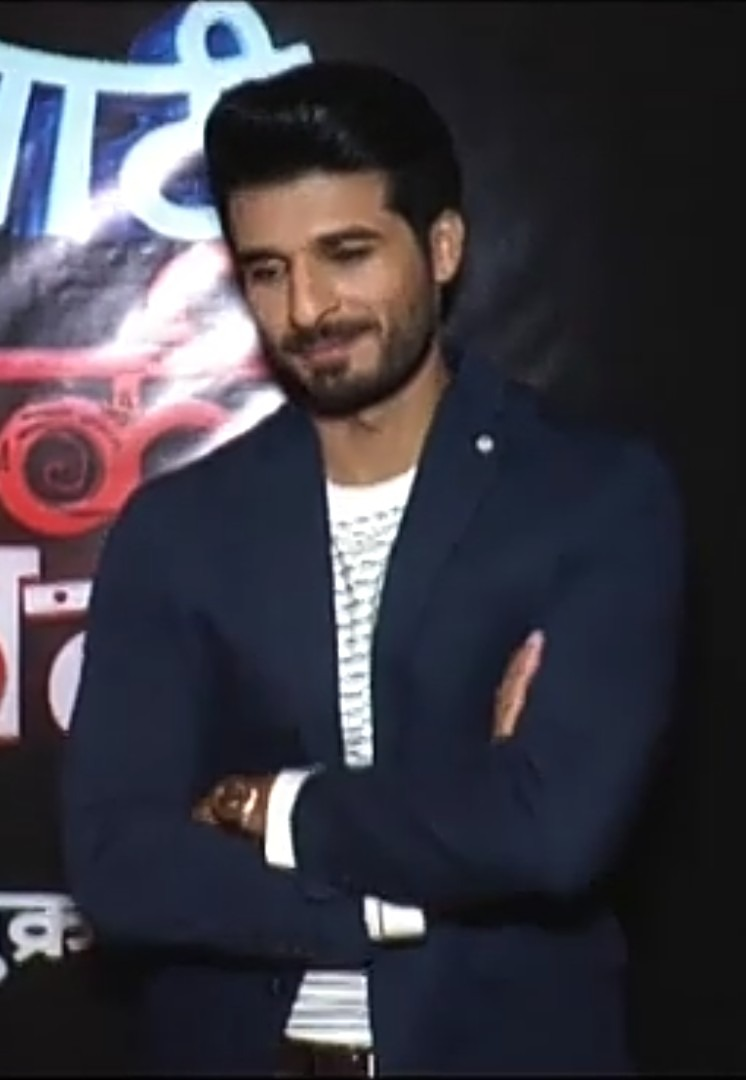
- Puneett in 2020
- Born: 4 December 1990 (age 35); Shivpuri, Madhya Pradesh, India
- Education: MBA, Prestige Institute of Management and Research (PIMR), Indore
- Occupations: Actor; Model
- Years active: 2016–present
- Known for: Baazi Ishq Ki; Sirf Tum (TV series)
- Height: 182 cm (6 ft 0 in)

Puneett Chouksey (born 4 December) is an Indian actor and model.

== Early life ==
Puneett Chouksey was born on 4 December 1990 in Shivpuri, Madhya Pradesh to Ushakiran Choukse. He has an elder brother, Sanket Chouksey who is also a TV actor. His sister, Mohini Shri Gaur is a playback singer.

Chouksey completed his MBA from Prestige Institute of Management and Research (PIMR), Indore.

== Career ==
Chouksey first started his career as a Customer Service Manager in IndusInd Bank. Then he joined Anupam Kher's Actor Prepares – The School for Actors to pursue his career in acting.

Chouksey made his acting debut in 2016, with Sadda Haq. He rose to fame, by playing, Aditya "Adi" Sehgal in Hindi television series Naagin 3. In 2019, Chouksey made his debut in web-series with Ishq Aaj Kal. In 2020, Chouksey got his first lead role as Arjun Venkatraman in Colors TV series Naati Pinky Ki Lambi Love Story opposite Riya Shukla. Chouksey was last seen playing the parallel lead role of Dr. Akshay Kaul in Colors TV series Shakti – Astitva Ke Ehsaas Ki opposite Jigyasa Singh. From November 2021 to July 2022, he appeared in Colors TV's show Sirf Tum. From March 2023 to September 2023, Chouksey appeared in Dangal's show Baazi Ishq Ki

== Television ==
Year	Serial	Role	Channel	Notes
2016	Sadda Haq	Arjun Khanna	Channel V India	
2016	Naagarjuna – Ek Yoddha	Aditya Dikshit	Life OK	
2017	Saath Nibhana Saathiya	Karan	Star Plus	Cameo Role
2018	Naagin 3	Aditya Sehgal	Colors TV	Negative Role
2019	Vish: A Poisonous Story	Aghori Baba	Colors TV	Cameo Role
2019	Laal Ishq	Zoraan (Episode 73)	And TV	Episodic Role
2019	Laal Ishq	Sumeet (Episode 158)	And TV	Episodic Role
2020	Naati Pinky Ki Lambi Love Story	Arjun Venkatraman	Colors TV	Lead Role
2021	Shakti – Astitva Ke Ehsaas Ki	Dr. Akshay Kaul	Colors TV	Cameo Role
2021–2022	Sirf Tum	Anshul "Ansh" Oberoi	Colors TV	Negative Role
2023	Baazi Ishq Ki	Ekansh Agnivanshi	Dangal	Lead Role
2025–2026	Aarti Anjali Awasthi	Ved Rajyavanshi	StarPlus	Lead Role

== Web series ==
Year	Show	Role	Channel
2019–2020	Ishq Aaj Kal	Ejaz Ali Khan	ZEE5
2020	Love Sorries	Niket	MXPlayer

== See also ==
- List of Indian actors
- List of Indian television actors
