= List of Hindi thriller shows =

This is a list of notable Hindi thriller shows.

Year	Name	Notes	Channel
1985	Karamchand	Karamchand was a popular Indian detective TV series telecast in the 1980s. It was broadcast on India's national television channel DD National, and was one of India's first detective series.	DD National
1991	Tehkikat	Tehkikat can be seen as an early Indian detective series clear;y inspired by the legend of Sherlock Holmes. Though it only spanned for 23 episodes, there is a lot to be deduced.	DD National
1993	Byomkesh Bakshi	Byomkesh Bakshi is a Bengali Detective who takes on spine-chilling case with his sidekick Ajit Bandyopadhyay. Byomkesh identifies himself as Satyanweshi meaning 'truth seeker' rather than a detective.	DD National
2018-present	C.I.D	This is a detective television anthology series about Crime Investigation Department.	Sony Entertainment Television
1999	Suraag – The Clue	Inspector Bharat and his assistant Inspector Nitin Srivastava formed a formidable partnership in solving crimes, mostly murder mysteries.	DD National
2002	Jasoos Vijay	This is an Indian detective mystery TV series produced by BBC World Service Trust in collaboration with Doordarshan and National AIDS Control Organisation to spread awareness about HIV/AIDS.	DD National
2002	Krishna Arjun	Krishna Arjun is a detective show produced by Cinevistaas Limited and Contiloe Entertainment.[2] The show aired on StarPlus which starred Shraddha Nigam and Hussain Kuwajerwala.A pair of young detectives based in Mumbai take on cases that range from murder mysteries, kidnapping, thefts, missing cases to frauds.	Star Plus
2002	Kya Hadsaa Kya Haqeeqat	The story follows trials and tribulations of a young woman, Nikki and the killer.	Sony Entertainment Television
2003	Crime Patrol	The series, whose motto is "Crime never pays" presents dramatized version of crime cases.	Sony Entertainment Television
2005	Kohinoor	This is a mystery-thriller Indian television series based on the popular American novel, The Da Vinci Code.	Sahara One
2009	Monica Mogre	This series consists of stories where Inspector Monica Mogre deals with very dangerous cases involved with crime.	Zee TV
2009	Ek Din Achanak	†	DD National
2012	Savdhaan India	It focuses on real-life crime incidents and the story of struggle of the victims in order to get justice for their sufferings.	Life OK
2012	Gumrah: End of Innocence	The show explores and suggests the right measures to avert crimes, narrating real-life stories revolving around harassment, kidnapping, murders and all sorts of crime made by teenagers.	Channel V
2014	Arjun	This series is about a rebellious cop, Arjun Rawte. He is transferred to Emergency Task Force (ETF) that solves cases linked to high-profile individuals. The crime fiction revolves around the dark past.	Star Plus
2014	Ishq Kills	The show is based on true events and it wrapped up in 13 episodes.	Star Plus
2015	Agent Raghav – Crime Branch	The show is inspired from the American police drama/mystery television series, The Mentalist.	&TV
2016	Hoshiyar… Sahi Waqt, Sahi Kadam	This series shows that the right steps to which a person can avoid to be a victim of crime.	&TV
2017	Dev	Showcasing stories inspired by real life events, this fictionalized investigative thriller plunges viewers into the world of Dev Burman - a detective who is an enigma in himself.	Colors
2017	Koi Laut Ke Aaya Hai	Revolves around a story of a girl who is trying to find the truth, and amidst all that she unveils dark secrets about her family and dead husband.	Star Plus
2017-2018	Kaal Bhairav Rahasya	The story is based on a Tamil novel Ragasiyamaga Oru Ragasiyam which was also made into a serial called Marmadesam by Indra Soundarrajan, and aired on television in the 90s.	Star Bharat
2018-2019	Kaal Bhairav Rahasya 2	This story is based on the supernatural thriller by the veteran Tamil writer Indra Soundarrajan, The Palace of Kottaipuram (Kottai Purathu Veedu) which was also made into a successful daily soap under the same name in 1990.	Star Bharat
2019	CIF	A team of investigators examine criminal cases and strive to bring criminals to justice	Dangal TV
2022	Control Room	This is a detective television series.	Dangal TV
2023	Baazi Ishq Ki	The story of the series revolves around a man named Ekansh Agnivanshi, who keeps tabs on his wife, Mehak, for a long time for his own purpose.	Dangal TV
2023	Keh Doon Tumhein	The story of series revolves around a serial killer and a single mother.	Star Plus

== See also ==
- List of Hindi horror shows
- List of Hindi comedy shows
- List of Hindi thriller films
