= D4 - Get Up and Dance =

- Genre: Youth show; Dance; Romance
- Created by: Anahata Menon
- Screenplay by: Pretti Mamgain; Mitali Mahajan; Dialogue: Preeti Mamgain
- Story by: Preeti Mamgain; Mitali Mahajan
- Directed by: Sidharth Sengupta; Iqbaal Rizzvi; Sahil Sharma
- Creative director: Snehil Dixit Mehra
- Starring: Niyati Fatnani; Utkarsh Gupta
- Music by: Bards of the East Band
- Country of origin: India
- Original language: Hindi
- No. of seasons: 2
- No. of episodes: 91

Production
- Producers: Sidharth Sengupta; Jyoti Sagar
- Production locations: Mumbai; Goa
- Cinematography: Hanoz VK
- Editors: Jaskaran Singh; Imran Chauhan
- Camera setup: Multi-camera
- Running time: Approx. 22 minutes
- Production company: Urban Brew Studios

Original release
- Network: Channel V India
- Release: 22 February – 30 June 2016

D4 - Get Up and Dance is an Indian dance fiction television series that premiered on Channel [V] India on February 22, 2016. The show incorporates elements of drama, romance, and dance choreography. D4 was produced by Urban Brew.

== Plot ==
Niharika Sinha, the AKA 'Baby', is a girl living in Delhi who dreams of becoming a dancer. Mikhail Shah is a famous choreographer living in Goa, and he is also Baby's idol. Baby becomes Mikhail's adoring manager and secretly falls in love with him. Baby is heartbroken to learn that her manipulative boss, Netra, is in a relationship with Mikhail.

Mikhail creates a show called Soul Mates about the love of two people, "Ruhans" (played by Mikhail) and "Aneri." Mikhail has a difficult time casting Aneri, a role that Netra would like to play herself. When Mikhail sees Baby dancing, Baby is asked to play the part of Aneri, but she initially declines, fearing her father's reaction. Baby eventually agrees to play the part of Aneri for one month, despite Netra attempting to stop her. When Mikhail finds out about Netra's failed plan, the two break up.

While travelling back to Delhi to visit her sick grandmother, Baby is involved in a car accident that leaves her paralyzed and unable to dance. Returning to Goa, Mikhail promises to help her dance again. Mikhail's best friend Harry fears these efforts will jeopardize Mikhail's career. Harry tells Baby to leave for Mikhail's sake, and Baby returns to Delhi. Through physiotherapy, Baby learns how to walk again.

Even though he doesn't care for Netra, Harry still works with her for Mikhail's benefit. Diya, Harry's girlfriend, doesn't like the pair working together and breaks up with him. Baby and Harry devise a plan to pretend they love each other, which causes Diya to realize she still loves Harry, and they get back together. However, this makes Mikhail jealous. Baby explains her fake relationship with Harry to Mikhail and indirectly tries to make Mikhail realize how much she loves him.

Baby and Mikhail spend an evening together dancing, and Mikhail takes her home. Mikhail realizes that he is in love with Baby and proposes to her during the performance of "Soulmate," and Baby accepts. This angers Netra, and she retaliates by calling Baby's father. Baby's father sends Tarun to save her and tells her that if she doesn't agree to marry him, she is not allowed to remain in Goa.

The same night, Mikhail comes to Baby's room and dances for her. She tells him that she is getting engaged to Tarun, only explaining that it is because of her father. Mikhail is heart broken.

On the day of Baby's engagement to Tarun, Mikhail pleads with Baby to listen to her heart, but she tells him no. Mikhail forcefully kisses Baby, and she doesn't stop him. When he asks her if she felt anything, she lies and tells him no, and follows through with her engagement to Tarun.

The next day, Mikhail and Baby have a photoshoot for Soul Mates, during which they share a meaningful glance. As they are going through the narration for Soul Mates, Baby and Mikhail end up sharing a passionate kiss, which angers Tarun and Netra. During a drunken moment, Tarun discloses the arranged engagement. Mikhail learns about this and is told that Baby only hid the truth because she loves him and wanted to save his dream of the production of Soul Mates. Mikhail rushes to Baby and tells her he is pulling out of Soul Mates. Both Baby and Tarun's parents come to visit, and the show ends with Baby's father realizing his mistake and agreeing to give his daughter's hand in marriage to Mikhail. The series ends with the successful performance of Soul Mates.

== Cast ==
- Niyati Fatnani as Niharika "Baby" Sinha (Female Lead)
- Utkarsh Gupta as Mikhail Shah (Male Lead)
- Pratyaksh raj bhatt as Amar
- Hitachi Chopra as Netra
- Abigail Jain as Aneri
- Tisha Kapoor as Sonam
- Aman Gandhi as Nikhil
- Swasti Kapur astara
- Anasua Chowdhury as Diya
- Roche Mascarenhas as Harry
- Malware R Ghai as Mrs. Kavita Sinha
- Reyhna Malhotra as Sweety (Cameo)
