= Naagarjuna – Ek Yoddha =

- Genre: Fantasy; Mythology; Action; Thriller; Drama
- Created by: Yash A Patnaik
- Based on: Mahabharatha
- Written by: Robin Bhatt
- Starring: Anshuman Malhotra; Pearl V Puri; Pooja Banerjee; Nitanshi Goel; Nikitin Dheer; Sudeepa Singh; Karishma Tanna; Mrunal Jain; Rehaan Roy
- Country of origin: India
- Original language: Hindi
- No. of seasons: 2
- No. of episodes: 176

Production
- Producer: Inspire Films
- Production locations: Mumbai; Dharamshala; Kangra; Palampur; Kerala; Madhya Pradesh; India
- Camera setup: Single-camera
- Running time: 22 minutes
- Production company: Inspire Films

Original release
- Network: Life OK
- Release: May 30, 2016 – 13 January 2017

Related
- Piya Rangrezz

Naagarjuna – Ek Yoddha (Naagarjuna – A Warrior) is an Indian Hindi fantasy action drama television series which premiered on 30 May 2016 on Life OK. Produced by Yash A Patnaik of Beyond Dreams Entertainment, it starred Anshuman Malhotra, Pearl V Puri, Pooja Banerjee and Nikitin Dheer.

Jeet Gannguli composed the soundtrack, which was sung by Jubin Nautiyal and Shankar Mahadevan. The show was written by Robin Bhatt and Akash Khurana while Nitin Chandrakant Desai designed the sets. The show's first look was launched in Mumbai on May 24, 2016.

== Plot ==
The show starts with a flashback. Arjun sits on a snake-shaped rock and the voice over starts. Astika indulges in a fight with Nagdev, kills him and takes the Naagmani and give to his king Maharaj Takshak. Takshak wants to attack the humans and wants the domination of snakes all over the world. It is then revealed that Astika has bewitched Pranali who does not know that he is a Naag. Pranali gives birth to his son and Astika comes to demand his son from her. Pranali somehow escapes from Astika's clutches and sets her son sailing in a river so that Astika can not get a hold over him. Vasuki, also a snake, is responsible for maintaining peace and balance between the prithvi lok and naag lok. He steals the Naagmani from Takshak's abode so that it is not misused and finds Arjun. It is then revealed that Astika's human son is the bearer of the Naagmani. Arjun is found by a couple who adopt him.

The story shifts to the present where Arjun is grown up and works in a garage as part-time job. He is a simple, innocent, hardworking lad who is hated by his family, except his parents and younger sister Chhutki for being adopted. His best friend is Aslam. He meets Noori and starts feeling for her. The next day, at the temple, Vasuki comes face to face with Arjun and touches his feet, puzzling Arjun. Astika's informant sees this and Vasuki kills him, letting Astika know that he is in Amroli. Now, Astika is in search of the Naagmani and his son, but is not aware that both are at the same place. He even comes in front of Arjun, but does not recognize him.

Where Noori and Arjun's friendship increases and Noori's father was not happy with that. Meanwhile in search of Vasuki and his son, Astika mixes poison in Prasad; everyone except Arjun faints. Astika believes Vasuki takes this new form to safeguard his identity. Vasuki discloses secret that Arjun is his son to Astika. Shankhachurna, Arjun's half-brother who wants Nagmani and hated his father, who always neglected him and his mother for his missing son. He comes to PrthiviLok and takes the identity of ACP Rajveer Singh. His mother Mohini also joins him. Arjun realises he was not ordinary and has some supernatural powers. Astika befriends Arjun and discusses his special abilities. Pranali meet Arjun and his family and so happy for taking care of his son to Yashosha. Before she reveals the truth about Arjun's birth to Yashodha, she is killed by Astika. Shankhachurna and Mohini find that Arjun is Astika's son and Nagmaani bearer they decide to kill him but fail every time. Noori's father want to get married her to Rajveer where Rajveer finds that Arjuns weakness was Noori and accept his proposal. Arjun tells the truth about Rajveer to Noori's father where Rajveer kills him and Noori's Father asks Arjun to protect Noori and take care of her.

Rajveer tells Noori that her father's dying wish is to get her daughter married to him. Arjun tries to explain Rajveer's identity but it backfires. Noori emotionally breaks up with Arjun and accepts to marry Rajveer because of her father's last wish. Meanwhile Arjun knows that Astika is her father and Rajveer is his step-brother and he was angry at Astika for keeping this secret. Vasuki explains to Arjun about story of Nagmani and cause of his birth. He overcomes various monsters sent by Rajveer and other enemies. Tina - Arjun and Aslam best friend return to her village after many years to investigate her town's mysteries. Takshak wakes up from his curse and try to get Nagmani back he captures Noori soul and threatens Arjun to complete task by saving her soul. After saving Noori's soul, Arjun's soul becomes trapped and he becomes Naagrakshas and threatens his hometown. After a few attempts Arjun's younger sister Chhutki notices his soul was in his chain where Naagraksha's holding. Vasuki sacrifices himself saving Arjun. Arjun was become normal with a new face Pearl V Puri and more powerful and he becomes Naagarjun. Arjun's parents do not believe his new face because of the enemies' plan. Arjun's mother notices he was her son after he become emotional by seeing Noori. Rajveer fumes anger by Arjun by getting more powers. They bring a powerful Naag where he was killed by Arjun. They hatch a plan and awaken the powerful evil serpent Maskini to say about his brother's death. She avenges her brother's death. Meanwhile Arjun and Noori patch up and confess their love and not to leave each other. Maskini comes to Earth posing as an innocent girl who loses her memory. Arjun's sister Chhutki saves her and brings her home and named Pari. Maskini attacks Arjun but each time she is defeated. Meanwhile she attracted to his powers. Finally Arjun knows that Maskini was behind all the attacks and he shows that he didn't kill her brother but leaves him by warning to get back her world. She realizes Rajveer's betrayal and falls deeply love with Arjun. She schemes, but Arjun learns her real identity and warns her and sends her back to her world where Arjun and Noori get married.

Seeking vengeance, Maskini abducts all the villagers to her world, challenging Arjun and Tina to save them. Arjun, assisted by his father, enters Maskini's world. Tina in village, searches for a portal to enter Maskini world to save the villagers. Maskini kills Aslam making Arjun grief. She tortures Arjun's family. Tina and some police officers enter Maskini's world through a secret portal. They all die where Tina and ACP remaining. Rajveer joins with Arjun and Astika to save villagers while he has other plans for Arjun. Astika is separated from the duo in the attack. Tina reaches the hidden villagers and with help of Astika she saves them. Maskini kills Mohini making Rajveer angry and she also kills Astika. Arjun and Shankhachurna are saddened by their parents' death where Rajveer was sorry to Arjun by lust of Nagmani and Joins with Arjun to defeat Maskini. Finally, Arjun defeats Maskini, kills her, and returns to his hometown with his wife and family. After three months, Noori gets pregnant and she has nightmares about her unborn child being attracted to evil powers. Arjun consoles her and she gives birth to a healthy boy continuing Arjun's legacy.

== Cast ==
=== Main ===
- Pearl V Puri as Arjun "Naagarjun" Shastri
  - Anshuman Malhotra as Young Arjun Shastri
- Pooja Banerjee as Noorie Shastri
- Karishma Tanna as Maskini
- Nikitin Dheer as Astika

=== Recurring ===
- Mrunal Jain as Shankhachurna/A.C.P. Rajveer Singh
- Sudeepa Singh as Mohini
- Shruti Ulfat as Yashodha Shastri, Arjun's foster mother
- Abigail Jain as Tina
- Aman Vasishth as Aslam
- Rishina Kandhari as Naag Maya
- Puneett Chouksey as Inspector Aditya Dixit
- Rehaan Roy as Ajgaar
- Ishita Vyas as Cheemi
- Nawab Shah as S. P. Baldev Singh
- Chetan Hansraj as Nag Dev, King of Naaglok many generations after Shesh Naag, King of all the Nagaas.
- Keerti Nagpure as Pranali, Naagarjuna's biological mother
- Saar Kashyap as Agni
- Rajesh Khera as Takshak
- Manish Wadhwa as Vasuki
- Richa Mukherjee as Urmi
- Arjun Singh Shekhawat as Digant, Arjun's brother
- Kishori Shahane as Goddess Manasa
- Vishal Karwal as Krishna
- Rahul Sharma as Arjuna
- Salman Shaikh as Ashvasena
- Iris Maity as Chitrāngadā
- Arshee Khan as Loka
- Srishti Jain as Draupadi
- Esha Chawla as Ulupi
- Ahmad Harhash as Babhuram Malhotra

== Production ==
=== Development ===
The show is going to be produced by Yash A Patnaik under the banner of Beyond Dreams Entertainment. In March, Mrunal Jain was signed to portray the role of the lead antagonist Anshuman Malhotra was signed to portray the lead role in the series but replaced by Pearl V Puri in September 2016 . Anshuman's real life girlfriend Sanaya Pithawalla was initially signed to star opposite him. But she was replaced by Pooja Banerjee at the last minute.Nikitin Dheer was signed to portray the second lead in the fantasy series. He will now be seen as a warrior, with grey shades, from the times gone by in the series.Keerti Nagpure was signed to star opposite him.Nawab Shah (actor) has been signed to play the role of a cop in the series. Nitanshi Goel was signed to play the role of Anshuman's kid sister Chutki. In May, Sheela Sharma, Gujarati actress Anandi Tripathi, model Arjun Singh and Ajay Kumar Singh have been roped to play prominent roles in the series.Kishori Shahane and Rishina Kandhari have also been finalised for prominent roles in the series. As of July 2016, Abigail Jain entered the show as Anshuman's childhood friend Tina. On 5 Dec 2016, The Times of India reported that actor Rehaan Roy was signed to play a villainous role in the show.

=== Character and looks ===
Nikitin Dheer plays an unusual anti-hero character in the show. He is also the reel father to Malhotra, the lead character. He trained himself in MMA (Mixed Martial Arts) and sword fighting for six months. Pooja has gone for a makeover of sorts for the show. The actress plays a simple girl-next-door character called Noorie in the show. Earlier, Pooja’s role was supposed to be played by Anshuman’s real life girlfriend Sanaya Pithawala but somehow the deal did not work out and Pooja bagged it at the last minute. Anshuman is four years younger to Pooja and to ensure they look approximately around the same age, she was asked to chop off her long tresses. Mrunal is seen in dual role, as a super villain, who will double up as a cop called Rajbir, in the show. Explaining the intricacies of playing such a role, he says, "My character Shankachurna is different compared to what I have done in the past." The costume that he will be wearing has a lot of elements, including claws jutting out from the right shoulder."It takes the actor over an hour just to get into the look of the character, complete with the costume and a wig, which he is wearing for the first time. Nitanshi will be playing the role of Chutki. She will be very cute, naughty and intelligent and will love and care for her brother a lot. Earlier Veera girl Harshita Ojha was finalized to play this character. However it is Nitanshi who had managed to bag this prized role now. Actor Arjun Singh will be playing a grey shade, Anandi will be seen as Anshuman's mother, Ajay will be Anshuman's father and Sheela would play his aunt in the show. Rishina will be playing the role of Nag Maya who will protect the Naglok. Her character will foresee the future. Pearl has been made to wear thick green-coloured lenses for his 'Naag' look.

=== Shooting locations ===
The show has been shot at intriguing districts of India like Kerala, Himachal Pradesh and Kashmir.

== See also ==
- Phir Laut Aayi Naagin
- Ishq Ki Dastaan - Naagmani
- Naagini
- Naagini 2
