= Nikitin Dheer =

Indian actor

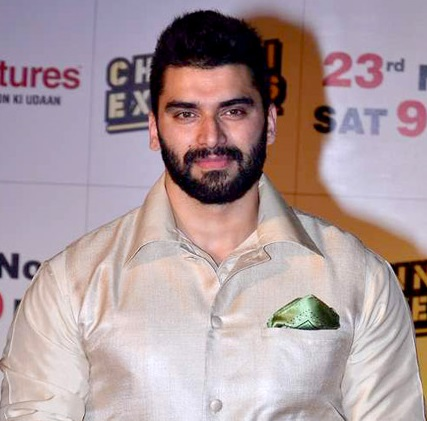
- Dheer at the success bash of his 2013 film Chennai Express
- Occupation: Actor
- Years active: 2008–present
- Spouse: Kratika Sengar (m. 2014)
- Children: 1
- Father: Pankaj Dheer

Nikitin Dheer is an Indian actor who primarily works in Hindi and Telugu films, and Hindi television. Dheer made his acting debut in 2008 with the film Jodhaa Akbar. He is best known for portraying Astika in Naagarjuna – Ek Yoddha (2016-2017) and Ravana in Shrimad Ramayan (2024). Dheer has appeared in successful films such as Ready (2011), Chennai Express (2013), Kanche (2015), Shershaah (2021) and Sooryavanshi (2021), and the series Indian Police Force (2024).

== Early and personal life ==
Dheer was born into a Punjabi family to actor Pankaj Dheer.

Dheer married actress Kratika Sengar on 3 September 2014 in a traditional Hindu wedding ceremony, in Mumbai. Sengar gave birth to their daughter, Devika, on 12 May 2022.

His father Pankaj Dheer died in October 2025.

== Career ==
Dheer made his acting debut in 2008 with Ashutosh Gowariker's historical drama Jodhaa Akbar, in which he co-starred alongside Hrithik Roshan and Aishwarya Rai Bachchan, as Sharifuddin Hussain, Akbar's brother-in-law. While the film earned critical appreciation and box office success, Dheer received praise for his role, with noted critic Taran Adarsh of Bollywood Hungama mentioning him as "fantastic". The same year he acted alongside Vivek Oberoi, Shriya Saran and Zayed Khan in Apoorva Lakhia's unremarkable action thriller Mission Istaanbul.

In 2011, Dheer appeared in Anees Bazmee's comedy Ready, alongside Salman Khan and Asin. The following year, he had a supporting role in Arbaaz Khan's action film Dabangg 2 alongside Salman Khan, Sonakshi Sinha and Prakash Raj. In 2013, he featured as the primary antagonist in Rohit Shetty's action comedy Chennai Express with Shahrukh Khan and Deepika Padukone. For his role as Tangaballi, a dreaded Tamil goon, Dheer was asked to gain more muscle and work on his accent. His physique in the film was received warmly; Mohar Basu noted that Dheer is "robust" although "hardly has a role enough to perform".

== Filmography ==
=== Films ===
Key
†	Denotes films that have not yet been released

- All films are in Hindi unless otherwise noted.

Year	Title	Role	Language	Notes	Ref.
2008	Jodhaa Akbar	Sharifuddin Hussain	Hindi		
2008	Mission Istaanbul	Al Gazni	Hindi		
2011	Ready	Aryan Chaudhary	Hindi		
2012	Dabangg 2	Chunni	Hindi		
2013	Chennai Express	Thangaballi	Hindi		
2015	Kanche	Eeshwar Prasad	Telugu		
2016	Housefull 3	Rohan Patel	Hindi		
2016	Freaky Ali	Danger Bhai	Hindi		
2017	Goutham Nanda	Gowda	Telugu		
2017	Mister	Rahul Wadayar	Telugu		
2018	Paak	Waqaar	Hindi		
2021	Shershaah	Ajay "Jassi" Singh Jasrotia	Hindi		
2021	Sooryavanshi	Mukhtar Ansari / Vivek Shastri	Hindi		
2021	Antim: The Final Truth	Daya Bagare	Hindi		
2022	Khiladi	Bala Singham	Telugu		
2022	Cirkus	Dev Chauhan	Hindi	Cameo appearance	
2024	Martin	Mushtaq	Kannada		
2025	Housefull 5	Captain Sameer	Hindi		
2025	Akaal: The Unconquered	Jangi Jahan	Punjabi		

=== Television ===
Year	Title	Role	Notes	Ref.
2011	Dwarkadheesh Bhagwan Shree Krishn	Kalayavana		
2014	Fear Files	Himself (Narrator)		
2014	Fear Factor: Khatron Ke Khiladi 5	Contestant	2nd runner-up	
2016–2017	Naagarjuna – Ek Yoddha	Astika		
2017–2018	Ishqbaaaz	Dr. Veer Singh Oberoi		
2019	Naagin 3	Huqum		
2024	Shrimad Ramayan	Ravana		

=== Web series ===
Year	Title	Role	Notes	Ref.
2020–2022	Raktanchal	Waseem Khan	2 seasons	
2024	Indian Police Force	Rana Virk		
TBA	Rakt Brahmand †	TBA	Filming	

== Awards and nominations ==
Year	Award	Category	Work	Result	Ref.
2009	Stardust Awards	The New Menace	Jodhaa Akbar	Won	
2014	Zee Cine Awards	Best Actor in a Negative Role	Chennai Express	Nominated	
2024	Indian Television Academy Awards	Best Actor in a Negative Role	Shrimad Ramayan	Won	
2025	Indian Telly Awards	Best Actor in a Negative Role	Shrimad Ramayan	Nominated	
