= Shrimad Ramayan =

Indian mythological television series

- Genre: Epic
- Created by: Siddharth Kumar Tewary
- Based on: Valmiki Ramayana; Ramcharitmanas
- Screenplay by: Anand Neelakantan
- Directed by: Kamal Monga; Loknath Pandey; Sumit Thakur
- Starring: See below
- Music by: Lalit Sen
- Opening theme: Shrimad Ramayan
- Country of origin: India
- Original language: Hindi
- No. of seasons: 1
- No. of episodes: 358

Production
- Producers: Siddharth Kumar Tewary; Gayatri Gill Tewary; Rahul Kumar Tewary
- Production location: Umargam
- Cinematography: Afsar Faruque; Veerdhaval Puranik
- Editor: Ganga Kacharla
- Camera setup: Multi-camera
- Running time: 20–40 minutes
- Production company: Swastik Productions

Original release
- Network: Sony Entertainment Television
- Release: 1 January – 9 August 2024
- Network: Sony SAB
- Release: 12 August 2024 – 10 March 2025

Shrimad Ramayan (transl. Holy Ramayana) is an Indian Hindi-language television series that premiered from 1 January 2024 to 9 August 2024 on Sony TV and from 12 August 2024 to 10 March 2025 on Sony SAB. Produced by Siddharth Kumar Tewary under the banner of Swastik Productions, the series is based on the epic Ramayana. It starred Sujay Reu as Rama and Prachi Bansal as Sita.

== Plot ==
The series showcases the life of Rama, the 7th incarnation of Vishnu. It shows how he dealt with hardships in his life and how his life became an inspiration. It also showcases the ordeal and journey he went through to free his beloved wife, Sita (Incarnation of Lakshmi), from the rakshasa king Ravana, who abducted her. Ram is born to King Dasharatha and Kaushalya while Bharat (incarnation of Vishnu's Shankha) is born to Kaikeyi and Lakshman (Sheshanaga) and Shatrughan (Sudarshan Chakra) are born to Sumitra. King Janak and Queen Sunayana get Sita from the Land. She grows up with her sister Urmila (Nagalakshmi) and cousins Mandavi (Lakshmi's Shankha) and Shrutkirti (Lakshmi's Chakra) and Sita lifts Mahadev's Bow pinaka. After growing up Ram and Lakshman defeat Tataka and her sons with the guidance of Sage Vishwamitra and reaches Mithila. Ram - Sita, Bharat - Mandavi, Lakshman - Urmila and Shatrughan - Shrutkirti get married. Manthara, along with Kaikeyi sends them to exile. The rest of the story is about the difficulties and hardships they faced during and after the exile and how Ram defeated Ravan without leaving Dharma(righteousness).The show then focuses on Lav and Kush, The sons of Ram and Sita and their Reunion. Sita spends 12 years into the forest nurturing Lav and Kush as Sita is sent once again on exile when a launder questions Sita's purity. She lives in Valmiki's Aashram. Lav and Kush eventually engage in war with Ram without knowing Sita is their mother and Ram is their father, this leads to the family's reunion but Sita's purity is once again in question so Sita returns to mother earth. As the time of Ram's departure from mortal world nears, lakshman takes jal samadhi and returns to Sheshnaag form. Ram later crowns Lav as King of North Ayodhya with Lavpuri as his capital kingdom and Kush is crowned as King of South Ayodhya with Kushavati as his capital kingdom. The sons of Bharat, Lakshman and Shatrughan are also given their respective kingdom's to rule. Bharat's son elder Pushkala ruled over Pushkalavati and younger son Taksha ruled over Takshila. Lakshman' s elder son Angad was given kingdom of Karupada and younger son Chandraketu ruled over a Kingdom named Chandrakanta. Shatrughna's elder son Subahu ruled over Madhupur and younger son, Shatrughati was crowned as King of Vidisha. At last Ram, Bharat and Shatrughna take jal samadhi while Hanuman and Vibhishan are asked to stay in mortal world until Vishnu takes their final avatar in Kal Yug and help him in re-establish dharma in Kal Yug.

== Cast ==
=== Main ===
- Sujay Reu as Rama / Vishnu - Vishnu's 7th incarnation; and Kaushalya's son; Bharat, Lakshmana and Shatrughna's half-brother; Sita's husband; Lav and Kush's father
  - Tanmay Shah as Young Ram
- Prachi Bansal as Sita / Devi Mahalakshmi - Lakshmi's incarnation; Janak and Sunaina's adoptive daughter; Urmila's elder adoptive sister, Mandavi and Shrutakirti's adoptive cousin; Rama's wife; Lav and Kush's mother
  - Hansika Jangid as Young Sita
- Basant Bhatt as Lakshmana - Sheshanaga's incarnation; Dasharatha and Sumitra's elder son; Rama and Bharata's half-brother; Shatrughna's brother; Urmila's husband; Angada and Chandraketu's father
  - Subhan Khan as Young Lakshman
- Nikitin Dheer as Ravana - Jaya's incarnation; King of Lanka; Vishrava and Kaikasi's second son; Sahastra Ravana, Kumbhakarna, Vibhishana and Shurpanakha's brother; Mandodari's husband; Meghanada, Akshayakumara and Atikaya's father
  - Athar Khan as Young Ravan
- Nirbhay Wadhwa as
  - Hanuman - Vayu's son; Kesari and Anjana's son; Rama's devotee (Incarnation of Shiva)
    - Karim Qureshi as Young Hanuman
  - Makaradhwaja - Hanuman's son
- Tarun Sharma as
  - Jatayu - Shyeni and Aruna's younger son; Sampati's brother
  - Jambavan - Rama's devotee; Jambavati's father
- Tarun Khanna as Shiva - Parvati's husband; Kartikeya and Ganesha's father
- Aishwarya Raj Bhakuni as Devi Parvati/ Mahagauri - Shiva's wife; Kartikeya and Ganesha's mother

=== Recurring ===
- Nikhlesh Rathore as Bharata - Shankha's incarnation; Dasharatha and Kaikeyi's son; Ram, Lakshmana and Shatrughna's half-brother; Mandavi's husband; Taksha and Pushkala's father
  - Hassan Syed as Young Bharata
- Samarthya Gupta / Purusharth Rawat as Shatrughna - Sudarshana's incarnation; Dasharatha and Sumitra's younger son; Rama and Bharata's half-brother; Lakshmana's brother; Shrutakirti's husband; Subahu and Shatrughati's father
  - Shabd Grover as Young Shatrughna
- Vaidehi Nair as Urmila - Nagalakshmi's incarnation; Janak and Sunaina's biological daughter; Sita's adoptive sister, Mandavi and Shrutakirti's cousin; Lakshmana's wife; Angada and Chandraketu's mother
  - Purvi Mishra as Young Urmila
- Sheersha Tiwari as Mandavi - Lakshmi shankh's incarnation; Kushadhvaj and Chandrabhaga's elder daughter; Sita and Urmila's cousin; Shrutakirti's sister; Bharata's wife; Taksha and Pushkala's mother
  - Dhwani Buch as Young Mandavi
- Siddhi Sharma / Charmi Dhami / Sonal Singh as Shrutakirti - Lakshmi chakra's incarnation; Kushadhvaj and Chandrabhaga's younger daughter; Sita and Urmila's cousin; Mandavi's sister; Shatrughna's wife; Subahu and Shatrughati's mother
  - Dhivija Arora as Young Shrutakirti
- Arav Chowdharry as Dasharatha - King of Ayodhya; Aja and Indumati's son; Kaushalya, Kaikeyi and Sumitra's husband; Rama, Bharata, Lakshmana and Shatrughna's father
- Anandi Tripathi as Kaushalya - Dasharatha's first wife; Rama's mother
- Shilpa Saklani as Kaikeyi - Dasharatha's second wife; Bharata's mother
- Bhawna Aneja as Sumitra - Dasharatha's third wife; Lakshmana and Shatrughna's mother
- Atharv J Jhony as Kusha - Ram and Sita's younger son; Lava's twin brother
- Shourya Mandoriya as Lava - Ram and Sita's elder son; Kusha's twin brother
- Jiten Lalwani as Janaka - King of Mithila; Kushadhvaja's brother; Sunaina's husband; Sita and Urmila's father
- Via Roy Chaudhary as Sunayana - Janaka's wife; Sita and Urmila's mother
- Rushiraj Pawar as Meghanada - Ravana and Mandodari's elder son; Akshayakumara and Atikaya's brother; Sulochana's husband
- Gurpreet Bedi / Harleen Rekhi as Mandodari - Mayasura and Hema's daughter; Ravana's wife; Meghanada and Akshayakumara's mother
- Pratik Vohra as Mayasura - Architect of Asuras, Hema's husband, Mandodari's father, Meghanada and Akshayakumara's grandfather
- Sameer Khan as Kumbhakarna - Vijaya's incarnation; Vishrava and Kaikasi's second son; Sahastra Ravana, Ravana, Vibhishana and Shurpanakha's brother; Kumbha and Nikumbha's father
  - Nishkarsh Dixit as Young Kumbhakarna
- Kunal Bakshi as Vibhishana - Vishrava and Kaikasi's third son; Sahastra Ravana, Ravana, Kumbhakarna and Shurpanakha's brother; Rama's devotee
- Vinit Kakar as Sambrasur
- Sangeeta Odwani as Shurpanakha - Vishrava and Kaikasi's daughter; Sahastra Ravana, Ravana, Kumbhakarna and Vibhishana's sister; Vidyutjiva's wife; Shambuka's mother
- Praneet Bhat as Sahastra Ravana - Vishrava and Kaikasi's eldest son; Ravana, Kumbhakarna, Vibhishana and Shrupanakha's brother; Indumukhi's husband and Chandrabahu's father
- Akash Kapoor as Akshayakumara - Ravana and Mandodari's younger son; Meghanada and Atikaya's brother
- Malhar Pandya as
  - Sugriva - King of Kishkindha; Vali's younger twin brother; Tara and Ruma's husband
  - Vali - King of Kishkindha; Sugriva elder twin's brother; Tara's husband; Angada's father
- Abhishek Jangra as Angada - Prince of Kishkindha; Vali and Tara's son
- Vanshika Yadav as Trinavati - Princess of Kishkindha; Sugriv and Ruma's daughter
- Ketan Karande as Nandi Shiva's bull
- Geeta Khanna as Manthara - Kaikeyi's maid
- Surendra Pal / Krishnakant Singh Bundela as Vasishtha - Family priest of Ayodhya; Rama, Bharata, Lakshmana and Shatrughna's teacher
- Vishnu Sharma as Vishvamitra - Rama and Lakshmana's teacher
- Dhananjay Singh as Sumantra - Dasharatha's minister
- Yogesh Mahajan as Shatananda - Gautama Maharishi and Ahalya's son; Janaka's advisor
- Manish Khanna as Jabali - Dasharatha's advisor
- Sandeep Arora as Nala - Vishwakarma's son; Nila's brother
- Nitin Parashar as Nila - Vishwakarma's son; Nala's brother
- Snehal Waghmare as Tara - Vali and Sugriva's wife; Angad's mother
- Meghna Panchal as Rumā - Sugriva and Vali's wife
- Jameel Chaudhary as Kesari - Brihaspati's son; Anjana's husband; Hanuman's father
- Kinjal Pandya as Anjana - Kesari's wife; Hanuman's mother
- Mrinal Shrivastav as Shabari - Rama's devotee; Matanga's student
- Deepak Bhatia as Parashurama - Vishnu's 6th incarnation; Jamadagni and Renuka’s son; Shiva’s disciple
- Garima Jain as Ahalya - Gautama's wife; Shatananda's mother
- Arun Singh as Atri - Anasuya's husband; Rama's guide; One of the Saptarshis
- Sampada Vaze as Anasuya - Atri's wife
- Meenakshi Sethi as Gargi - Vachaknu's daughter
- Raja Kapse as Kakabhushundi - Rama's devotee
- Prithvi Sankhala as Valmiki - Author of Ramayana; Sita stays at his aashram during her exile; Lava and Kusha's guru; Brahma's avatar
- Rivaan Thakkar as Angada - Lakshmana and Urmila's elder son; Chandraketu's elder brother
- Samveg Kaudan as Chandraketu - Lakshmana and Urmila's younger son; Angad's younger brother
- Rithvik Gupta as Taksha - Bharata and Mandavi's elder son; Pushkala's elder brother
- Veer Sharma as Pushkala - Bharata and Mandavi's younger son; Taksha's younger brother
- Prithil Jain as Subahu - Shatrughna and Shrutakirti's elder son; Shatrughati's elder brother
- Goraksh Babel as Shatrughati - Shatrughna and Shrutakirti's younger son; Subahu's younger brother
- Neha Nirwan as Sulochana - Vasuki and Shatashirsha's daughter; Meghanada's wife
- Brownie Parashar as Shukracharya - Meghanada's teacher
- Kamaljeet Rana as Khara - Dushana's twin brother; Ravana, Kumbhakarna, Vibhishana and Shurpanakha's step-brother
- Amit Kalra as Dushana - Khara's twin brother; Ravana, Kumbhakarna, Vibhishana and Shurpanakha's step-brother
- Arjun Kumar as Vidyutjiva - Shurpanakha's husband; Shambuka's father
- Devish Ahuja as Shambuka - Shurpanakha and Vidyutjiva's son
- Neetu Pandey as Kaikasi - Vishrava's wife; Ravana, Kumbhakarna, Vibhishana and Shurpanakha's mother
- Yogesh Bhardwaj as Prahasta - Sumali and Ketumathi's son; Ravana's uncle; Lanka's chief commander
- Vineet Asthana as Kumbha - Kumbhakarna and Vajrajvala's elder son; Nikumbha's brother
- Touseef Raza Barkati as Nikumbha - Kumbhakarna and Vajrajvala's younger son; Kumbha's brother
- Bhupinder Bhoopi as Kampana, Lankan Commander in Ravana’s army
- Ansha Sayed as Tataka - Sunda's wife; Marich and Subhau's mother
- Satendra Yadav as Subahu - Sunda and Tataka's son; Marich's brother
- Asha Singh as Trijata - Sita's guard at Ashoka vatika
- Ritu P Sood as Surasa - Daksha and Asikni's daughter; Kashyapa's wife
- Mohammed Saud Suri as Shravana Kumara - Shantanu and Gyanvanti's son
- Govind Namdev as Brahma - Creator of the Universe; Saraswati's husband
- Shreya Khanna as Saraswati - Goddess of Knowledge; Brahma's wife
- Sarthak Dayma as Ganesha - God of Wisdom and Luck; Shiva and Parvati's younger son
- Devesh Gangawar as Surya - Spiritual teacher of Hanuman
- Meer Ali as Indra - King of Devas; Jayanta's father
- Gaurav Sharma as Jayanta - Indra's son
- Praneet Bhat as Sahastramukh Ravan - Brother of Ravana. Father of Chandrabahu.
- Bharat Bhatia / Akshay Dandekar as Kubera - God of Wealth; Vishrava and Ilavida's son; Ravana, Kumbhakarna, Vibhishana and Shurpanakha's step-brother
- Sharma M Shishir as Shani - God of Karma
- Aryan Hasan as Varshal Mahabal - Commander of Vanara sena
- Sandeep Sharma as Narada - Messenger of the Devas
- Punesh Tripathi as Jambumali - Prahasta's son; Ravana's cousin
- Arnav as Somkaran - Luv and Kush's friend
- Dhrisha Kalyani as - Prasuta; Sister in Law
- Rudraksh nisiddh panchal as - Villager; Gurukul's student (Child Shree Ram Friend)

== Production ==
=== Development ===
Siddharth Kumar Tewary announced Shrimad Ramayan, that is produced under his banner Swastik Productions in August 2023. It is an adaptation of the epic Ramayana, and is based on Valmiki's Ramayana and Tulsidas's Ramcharitmanas. In December 2023, Tewary stated that criticism to film Adipurush, was one of the reason to make the show. He added,

Honestly, I like the fact that audiences are sensitive towards the history of our country. It defines our history, culture and even our country. There is a reason why someone would get offended. And it's not my intention to offend anyone. I want them to come together and celebrate it with me. I have a proper research team and everything that's going out, every word about this show is properly vetted. So if anyone raises a question tomorrow, we have an authentic source that we can count on.

The team of Shrimad Ramayan also visited Ayodhya, before the launch of the series.

=== Casting ===
Sujay Reu and Prachi Bansal were cast as Rama and Sita respectively. The series marks Reu's third and Bansal's second project with the production house. Basant Bhatt and Vaidehi Nair were cast as Lakshmana and Urmila. Nirbhay Wadhwa was cast as Hanuman, in his fourth on-screen portrayal of the character.

In October 2023, Nikitin Dheer joined the cast as Ravana, marking his television comeback after 5 year. Aarav Chowdhary was cast as Dashratha. Nikhilesh Rathore was then cast as Bharata and Samarthya Gupta was cast as Shatrughna. Later, Anandi Tripathi was cast as Kaushalya, Bhawna Aneja as Sumitra and Shilpa Saklani as Kaikeyi. Neetu Pandey was cast as Kaikasi.

In January 2024, Gurpreet Bedi was cast to play Mandodari and Garima Jain was cast to play Ahalya. Sangeeta Odwani was cast to play Shurpanakha and Arjun Kumar was cast to play Vidyutjiva. Later, in February 2024, Rushiraj Pawar was cast to play Meghanada. In March 2024, Malhar Pandya was cast in the dual role of brothers Sugriva and Vali. In September 2024, Atharv J Jhony and Shourya Mandoriya were cast as Kusha and Lava respectively.

=== Design ===
The series set covering 10 acres of land in Umargam, Valsad, Gujarat, is designed by art director Omung Kumar. Costume designer of the series is Shibapriya Sen. Sita's wedding look included 15 kg lehenga and 15meter long head trail. The hand-made embroidery took 3 days and 18 hours, with the entire lehenga taking 5 days to complete. Sen added,

Designing Sita's wedding look was ethereal, where femininity met divinity. It was a blessing to design the wedding looks for Prabhu Shri Ram and Mata Sita. The costumes and accessories were heavy, but the actors embraced it. We've maintained the sanctity of the occasion through traditional craftsmanship.

=== Filming ===
Shrimad Ramayan is mainly shot in Umargam in Gujarat and has a high production and VFX value.

=== Dubbed versions ===
Since May 2024, Shrimad Ramayan has been dubbed in other languages such as in Tamil, Telugu, Kannada, Malayalam and Bangla. It is broadcast on Sun TV Network's group of channels in the respective languages. The show is also dubbed in Bengali language and is broadcast on Sony Aath since October 2024.

== Soundtrack ==
Shrimad Ramayan Original Sound Track

Soundtrack album by Lalit Sen
- Released: 15 December 2023
- Genre: Soundtrack
- Length: 38:00
- Language: Hindi
- Label: Sony Entertainment Television
- Producers: Siddharth Kumar Tewary; Gayatri Gill Tewary

The soundtrack of Shrimad Ramayan has been composed by Lalit Sen with lyrics written by Vinod Sharma. The original title track and all major songs of the show were sung by Harshit Saxena. His soulful performance received widespread praise and earned him the Indian Television Academy Award for Best Singer in 2024. Composer Lalit Sen was also awarded Best Music for the same series. Subhadeep Das Chowdhury, Menuka Poudel, Vaibhav Gupta, Ananya Pal and Utkarsh Wankhede, the contestants of Indian Idol 14, have also sung a version of the title song.

Shrimad Ramayan: Tracklisting
No.	Title	Length
1.	"Shrimad Ramayan (Theme Song)"	1:48
2.	"Shrimad Ramayan"	1:48
3.	"Ram Siya Ram"	2:14
4.	"Ramayan Chaupai"	20:55
5.	"Shri Ram Theme"	1:00
6.	"Sita Theme"	1:00
7.	"Ram Janam"	0:52
8.	"Sita Janam"	0:52
9.	"Narayan Theme"	1:30
10.	"Mahadev Theme"	0:30
11.	"Siya Varan Kare Ram"	2:12
12.	"Thumak Thumak"	0:44
13.	"Ram Bhakt Le Chala"	0:45
14.	"Heart Attack"	3:18

== Reception ==
Gayatri Nirmal from Pinkvilla stated, "The surprisingly fresh and convincing cast works. The rich storytelling and the VFX (visual effects) literally added life to the characters, and the dialogues, drawn from the original scripture of Valmiki, are both powerful and thought-provoking."

== Awards and nominations ==
Year	Award	Category	Recipient	Result	Ref.
2024	Indian Television Academy Awards	Best Actor in a Negative Role	Nikitin Dheer	Won	
2024	Indian Television Academy Awards	Best Costumes	Shibapriya Sen	Won	
2024	Indian Television Academy Awards	Best Music Composer – TV	Lalit Sen	Won	
2024	Indian Television Academy Awards	Best Singer – TV	Harshit Saxsena	Won	
2025	Indian Telly Awards	Best Actor in a Supporting Role	Arav Chowdharry	Won	
2025	Indian Telly Awards	Best Actress in a Supporting Role	Shilpa Saklani	Nominated	
2025	Indian Telly Awards	Best Actor in a Negative Role	Nikitin Dheer	Nominated	
2025	Indian Telly Awards	Best Costumes	Shibapriya Sen	Won	
2025	Indian Telly Awards	Best Editor – Fiction	Ganga Kacharla	Won	
2025	Indian Telly Awards	Best TV Cameraman – Fiction	Veerdhaval Puranik	Nominated	

== See also ==
- List of programs broadcast by Sony Entertainment Television
- List of programmes broadcast by Sony SAB
