= Ishq Mein Marjawan =

Indian television series

- Genre: Romance; Thriller
- Created by: Yash A Patnaik
- Developed by: Yash A Patnaik
- Screenplay by: Sameer Siddiqui; Koel Chaudhuri
- Story by: Mamta Yash Patnaik
- Directed by: Kushal Zaveri; Akhilesh Bhagat
- Creative director: Sonal Kakkad
- Starring: Arjun Bijlani; Aalisha Panwar; Nia Sharma; Sonarika Bhadoria
- Theme music composer: Toshi-Sharib
- Opening theme: Iss Ishq Mein Marjawan
- Composers: Dony Hazarika; Udbhav Ojha
- Country of origin: India
- Original language: Hindi
- No. of seasons: 1
- No. of episodes: 475

Production
- Producers: Yash A Patnaik; Mamta Patnaik
- Cinematography: Jenil Patel
- Editor: Kshitija Khandagle
- Camera setup: Multi-camera
- Running time: 22–30 minutes
- Production companies: Beyond Dreams Entertainment; Inspire Films Private Limited

Original release
- Network: Colors TV
- Release: 20 September 2017 – 28 June 2019

Related
- Ishq Mein Marjawan 2 Fanaa: Ishq Mein Marjawan

Ishq Mein Marjawan (transl. I will die in this love) is an Indian romantic thriller television series which aired on Colors TV from 2017 to 2019. It starred Arjun Bijlani, Aalisha Panwar, Nia Sharma and Sonarika Bhadoria.

== Plot ==
Intelligent and rich, Deep Raichand meets the very beautiful Aarohi Kashyap at a party and seemingly falls for her, although he is already married to her look-alike Tara Raichand, a serial killer. In fact, Deep does not love Aarohi; he and Tara only want to frame Aarohi for the murders committed by Tara.

When Deep tells her that he loves her (which is just to show off) she reveals about her boyfriend Vishal. Tara kills him (so that Aarohi accepts Deep's proposal), and his plan succeeds, as the shattered Aarohi marries Deep. Meanwhile, a police officer who was chasing Arohi also gets killed mysteriously.

Due to her nature, Deep slowly begins to fall in love with her for real while she also feels the same for him. Suspecting that Deep loves Aarohi, Tara confronts him. He denies but when she saw Aarohi and Deep together on the bed, A jealous Tara plans to kill Aarohi. To warn him, Tara murdered Aarohi's elder brother, Aniket.

Deep's family is in fact pretenders hired by him. Prithvi is his manager; Maya is Tara's aunt; Sanaya and Sushant are indeed lovebirds who are actors from a drama company including Diya. Aarohi learns the truth. Deep finds out and tortures her, framing her for an incident and jailing her.

Aarohi is in jail and tries to escape numerous times but gets caught every time.the jailor believing that Aarohi's escape attempts are defying her locks her up in a dark room. The jailor decides to make arohi a prostitute for a minister and she tricks them and gets it all records. She then blackmails them to let her go and declare her dead. Deep now lives in Mumbai. Aarohi disguises herself as Kesari to enter his house. Tara's mother Roma reveals Deep's full story. He was actually an orphan, named Deep Raj Singh, and as Tara loved him, Roma realised only Deep can stop Tara from killing people and she got the two married.

Deep gets to know Kesari is actually Aarohi, and Deep loves and protects her so he tells Aarohi that he sent her to jail only because he didn't want her to die. Aarohi then pretends to be Tara and goes to London with Deep. Aarohi shoots Deep and she returns to India. Deep is still alive, and he realised that he destroyed Aarohi's life and he tries to get away from Aarohi. She meets Tara simultaneously, their family comes and Deep misleads the police that Tara is Aarohi, and gets her arrested, and apologises to Aarohi. Deep's father, Dilip Singh pretends to be disabled and Aarohi discovered it.

When Roma begs Deep for Tara's release, he helps her. Tara returns. She attempts to murder Aarohi after finding out what Deep did with her. Mistakenly, instead of Aarohi; she fatally murders Roma. Deep and Aarohi decide to remarry, but at their wedding, Tara returns. But Deep and Aarohi are finally married.

Aarohi finds herself in a truck; her face has been changed. It is revealed that Deep changed her face and wanted to send her out of India. Aarohi returns to Mumbai and finds Deep living with Tara in the Raichand mansion. Tara is now living as Aarohi in front of everyone. Aarohi pretended to be Anjali where she discovers that her parents were alive as she tries to convince them that she is their daughter.

Aarohi discovers Deep was always using her and never truly loved her. She is pregnant with his child and wants revenge, but Deep convinces her that he loves her and that they're trying to escape from Tara.

Wicked Tara plots to kill Aarohi and her child, making it to look like suicide. Aarohi assumes that Deep pushed her down a cliff. She loses her child and moves to a small village. Deep thinks Aarohi betrayed him and died with his child.

Deep begins to hate Aarohi and tries to find happiness with Tara, who feels elated as she succeeds in separating Deep and Aarohi. In the village, Aarohi meets warrior Abhimanyu who teaches her how to defend herself.

Abhimanyu enters Raichand mansion as a bodyguard to expose Deep and Tara's horrendous acts. Aarohi fails to take revenge on Deep who again convinces her that he loves her while persuading Tara he wants to get rid of Aarohi.

A blackmailer, named Mr. X; who tries to control the entire Raichand family, mysteriously appears. Aarohi feels that Mr. X is Deep, but she cannot prove it. Raj and Tara join forces and kill Abhimanyu. Deep and Raj were in a deadly race and game where Deep's brakes are broken, but escaped from the car, while they started fighting with each other, Raj accidentally fell down from a cliff and dies.

A few months later, after Mr. X's mystery is solved, Deep is blind and works with Shera his assistant, and does big deals. When Aarohi returns, she is shocked to see Deep is blind. She tries to find out the truth and is convinced that Deep is blind and innocent. Meanwhile, Deep has married a girl named Netra; who works for the police department and she has come to the Raichand family to arrest Deep; who is dealing in diamonds and expensive jewellery and is a white-collar criminal. Deep's new wife, Netra is a corrupt gold digger. Aarohi feels that Deep is innocent and tries to protect him from Netra. Aarohi works as a police agent to reveal the truth behind Deep.

Tara dies and her eyes are gifted to Deep; who is no longer blind. However, Tara has not actually died; she returns and kills Netra. The love triangle of Tara, Deep, and Aarohi continues since Deep loves Tara and Aarohi loves Deep. Later, it is shown that Deep loves Tara, and how it was plotted from the starting to the end and it is said that Aarohi did everything for her love and Deep did everything for his love Tara. The show ends with Tara and Deep leaving the country and Aarohi still looking for Deep. He used Aarohi as she was the look-alike of Tara to save Tara because she was a psycho serial killer and Deep loves Tara unconditionally. Aarohi went out looking for Deep and Tara, while they are trying to leave. Aarohi is left shattered and heartbroken. Thus; as a lesson, if you're to fall in love, always make sure that it is pure with fidelity in it as stated by Deep Raj Singh.

== Cast ==
=== Main ===
- Arjun Bijlani in a dual role as
  - Deep Raj Singh — Virendra and Vasundhara's son; Raj's twin brother; Tara, Aarohi and Netra's husband (2017–2019)
  - Raj Deep Singh — Virendra and Vasundhara's son; Deep's twin brother (2019) (Dead) (Killed by Deep Raj Singh)
- Aalisha Panwar in a dual role as
  - Tara Raichand Singh — Dilip and Roma's daughter; Virat's sister; Vedika's half-sister; Deep's first wife (2017–2019)
  - Aarohi Kashyap Singh — Niranjan and Charu's daughter; Aniket and Kia's sister; Deep's second wife (2017–2018) (before plastic surgery)
- Nia Sharma in a dual role as
  - Aarohi Kashyap Singh — Niranjan and Charu's daughter; Aniket and Kia's sister; Deep's second wife (2018–2019) (after plastic surgery)
  - Anjali "Anju" Sharma — Virat's ex-girlfriend (2018)
- Sonarika Bhadoria as Netra Sharma Singh — Mohan and Swati's adoptive daughter; Sanju's adoptive sister; Deep's third wife (2019) (Dead) (Killed by Tara Raichand)

=== Recurring ===
- Amit Behl as Virendra Pratap Singh — Vasundhara's husband; Deep and Raj's father (2019)
- Lata Sabharwal as Vasundhara Pratap Singh — Veena's sister; Virendra's wife; Deep and Raj's mother (2018–2019)
- Kishori Shahane as Veena Devi — Vasundhara's sister (2018)
- Abhinav Kohli as Dilip Raichand — Roma's husband; Tara and Virat's father (2018)
- Suchita Trivedi as Roma Raichand — Maya's sister; Dilip's wife; Tara and Virat's mother (2017–2018) (Dead) (Killed by Tara Raichand)
- Vineet Raina as ACP Lakshya Pradhan / Inspector Virat Raichand / Malik — Dilip and Roma's son; Tara's brother; Vedika's half-brother (2017–2019)
- Tuhinaa Vohra as Maya Raichand — Roma's sister (2017–2018) (Dead) (Killed by Aarohi Kashyap)
- Prithvi Zutshi as Niranjan Kashyap — Charu's husband; Aniket, Aarohi and Kia's father; Nikku's grandfather (2018–2019)
- Shravani Goswami as Charu Kashyap — Niranjan's wife; Aniket, Aarohi and Kia's mother; Nikku's grandmother (2018) (Dead)
- Harsh Vashisht as Aniket Kashyap — Niranjan and Charu's son; Aarohi and Kia's brother; Ridhi's husband; Nikku's father (2017) (Dead) (Killed by Tara Raichand)
- Aakanksha Awasthu as Ridhi Kashyap — Aniket's wife Nikku's mother (2017–2018) (Dead) (Killed by Tara Raichand)
- Unknown as Nikku Kashyap — Aniket and Ridhi's son (2017–2018) (Dead) (Killed by Virat Raichand)
- Sakshi Sharma as Kia Kashyap — Niranjan and Charu's daughter; Aniket and Aarohi's sister (2019)
- Ravi Gosain as Mohan Sharma — Swati's husband; Sanju's father (2019)
- Rajlaxmi Solanki as Swati Sharma — Mohan's wife; Sanju's mother; Netra's adoptive mother (2019)
- Araham Sawant as Sanju Sharma — Mohan and Swati's son; Netra's adoptive brother (2019)
- Mihir Mishra as Prithvi Dwivedi — Vedika's father (2017–2018) (Dead) (Killed by Aarohi Kashyap)
- Akanksha Juneja as Vedika Dwivedi — Prithvi's daughter (2018) (Dead) (Killed by Deep Raj Singh)
- Vishavpreet Kaur as Laxmi Agarwal — Abhimanyu's mother (2018–2019)
- Shoaib Ibrahim as Abhimanyu Agarwal — Laxmi's son (2018–2019) (Dead) (Killed by Raj Deep Singh and Tara Raichand)
- Fahmaan Khan as CBI Officer Randhir Khurrana (2019)
- Benazir Shaikh as Tarang — Randhi's assistant (2019)
- Sudha Chandran as Sujata (2019)
- Mrinalini Tyagi as CBI Officer Upasana Malik (2018–2019)
- Dushyant Wagh as Kashyap / Trivedi (2018) / (2019)
- Sachin Cahubey as Shera — Deep's assistant (2017;–2019)
- Deepali Saini as Surekha (2018)
- Ananya Soni as Sudha (2018)
- Neha Bam as Kalyani Singh (2018)
- Puneet Panjwani as Shankar (2018)
- Kushal Punjabi as Advocate Danny Manchanda (2018) (Dead) (Killed by Roma Raichand)
- Aashish Kaul as Dr. Bhandari Raichand (2017–2018) (Dead) (Killed by Aarohi Kashyap)
- Prema Mehta as Diya (2017–2018)
- Vividha Kirti as Supriya (2017)
- Arjun Aneja as Sushant (2017)
- Faiza Faiz as Sanaya (2017)
- Aashish Mehrotra as Vishal Singh (2017)
- Shruti Yogi as Mayuri (2017)

=== Special appearances ===
- Arshi Khan in Holi celebration (2018)
- Ritvik Arora as Ahaan Dhanrajgir from Tu Aashiqui
- Jannat Zubair Rahmani as Pankti Dhanrajgir from Tu Aashiqui
- Rahil Azam as Jayant Dhanrajgir from Tu Aashiqui
- Raqesh Vashisth as Reyansh Diwan from Tu Aashiqui
- Vivian Dsena as Harman Singh from Shakti - Astitva Ke Ehsaas Ki
- Rubina Dilaik as Soumya Singh from Shakti - Astitva Ke Ehsaas Ki
- Meera Deosthale as Chakor Rajvanshi from Udaan Sapnon Ki
- Vijayendra Kumeria as Suraj Rajvanshi from Udaan Sapnon Ki
- Shivin Narang as Jai Mittal from Internet Wala Love
- Tunisha Sharma as Aadhya Verma from Internet Wala Love
- Urvashi Dholakia as Mohini (2019)

== Broadcast ==
Languages	Release	Drama	Broadcast
Vietnam	21 March 2019	Co Dau The Toi Ishq Mein Marjawan	VTVCab 1 - VieGiaiTri
