= Baazi Ishq Ki =

Indian drama television series

- Official Poster
- Genre: Drama; Romance; Thriller; Romantic Thriller
- Created by: Yash A Patnaik
- Screenplay by: Manoj Tiwari; Garima Goyal; Gurmeet Kaur Udayan; Dialogues; Sonali Gupta Srivastava
- Story by: Mamta Patnaik
- Directed by: Atif Khan; Ajay Kumar
- Starring: Puneett Chouksey; Khushbu Tiwari; Tina Philip
- Theme music composer: Ripul Sharma
- Opening theme: "Baazi Ishq Ki"
- Country of origin: India
- Original language: Hindi
- No. of seasons: 1
- No. of episodes: 144

Production
- Producer: Yash A Patnaik
- Cinematography: Nithin Valandey
- Camera setup: Multi-Camera
- Running time: 22-24 minutes
- Production companies: Beyond Dreams Entertainment; Inspire Films

Original release
- Network: Dangal
- Release: 27 March – 9 September 2023

Baazi Ishq Ki (transl. Bet On Love) is an Indian Hindi-language romance, thriller television series that premiered on 27 March 2023 on Dangal. It starred Puneett Chouksey, Khushbu Tiwari and Tina Philip. This show was produced by Yash A Patnaik and Mamta Patnaik under the banner of Beyond Dreams Entertainment and Inspire Films. It went off air on 9 September 2023.

== Plot ==
Mehak Mishra's life changes when a mysterious yet charismatic man Ekansh Agnivanshi enters her life. Ekansh was keeping tabs on Mehak for a long time for his own purpose. When he learns of Mehak's fiancé, he kills him. Later Ekansh asks for Mehak's hand. After marriage Mehak learns that Ekansh has a mysterious past and he was married before to a girl named Palak. Later it turns out that her own sister Niharika was Ekansh's first wife. Niharika changed her name to Palak when she married Ekansh. Now everyone's lives are entangled in each other. The whole Agnivanshi family excluding Sunita, Rani and Ekansh die in a fire in a hotel caused by Sunita.

== Cast ==
=== Main ===
- Puneett Chouksey as Ekansh Agnivanshi: Sunita's stepson; Mehak and Kajal's husband; Palak's ex–husband; Trisha's widower (2023)
  - Riyansh Ayer as Child Ekansh Agnivanshi (2023)
- Khushbu Tiwari as Mehak Mishra Agnivanshi: Niharika / Palak's younger sister; Vandana's younger daughter; Ekansh's second wife (2023)
- Tina Philip as Dr. Kajal Sharma / Dr. Kajal Ekansh Agnivanshi: A consulting psychiatrist; Rajesh and Asha's daughter; Omkar's younger sister; Ekansh's fourth wife (2023)

=== Recurring ===
- Surabhi Das / Aditi Rawat as Trisha: Rani's younger sister; Ekansh's third wife and one sided obsessive lover (2023) / (2023) (Dead)
- Ritu Chaudhary as Sunita Agnivanshi: Ekansh's stepmother; Pushpa and Alok's elder sister (2023)
- Jyotsna Chandola as Palak Agnivanshi / Niharika Mishra: Mehak's elder sister; Vandana's elder daughter; Ekansh's first wife (2023)
- Arham Abbasi as Viren Agnivanshi: Sunita's elder son; Ekansh's elder stepbrother; Dhruv's elder cousin (2023) (Dead)
- Farah Lakhani as Rani Agnivanshi: Trisha's elder sister; Viren's widow (2023) (Dead)
- Meenakshi Mini as Tara Agnivanshi: Sunita's foster daughter; Meena's biological daughter (2023) (Dead)
- Gaurav Jain as Dhruv Agnivanshi: Narendra and Meena's son; Ekansh and Viren's younger cousin (2023)
- Mamata Solanki as Meena Agnivanshi: Narendra's wife; Dhruv and Tara's mother; Ekansh's aunt (2023) (Dead)
- Puneet Panjwani as Narendra Agnivanshi: Meena's husband; Dhruv's father; Ekansh's uncle (2023) (Dead)
- Rakesh Mudgal as Avdesh: Ekansh's paternal uncle "fufaji"; Jayanti's husband; Tara's biological father (2023) (Dead)
- Neetu Pandey as Vandana Mishra: Mehak and Niharika (Palak)'s mother (2023)
- Devashish Chandiramani as Vikram Agnivanshi: Ekansh's younger cousin (2023) (Dead)
- Shahab Khan as Rajesh Sharma: Asha's husband; Omkar and Kajal's father (2023)
- Sharmila Goenka as Asha Rajesh Sharma: Rakesh's wife; Omkar and Kajal's mother (2023)
- Afzaal Khan as Alok: Sunita and Pushpa's younger brother; Chanda's husband; Ekansh's step maternal uncle (2023) (Dead)
- Melissa Pais as Chanda: Alok's wife; Ekansh's step maternal aunt "mami" (2023) (Dead)
- Alok Shaw
- Sai Ranade as Pushpa: Sunita's younger sister; Alok's elder sister; Ekansh's step maternal aunt "masi" (2023)
- Lovish Saini as Omkar Sharma: Rajesh and Asha's son; Kajal's elder brother (2023)

== Soundtrack ==
Baazi Ishq Ki

Soundtrack album by Soumee Sailsh
- Released: 2023
- Genres: Romance; Soundtrack
- Length: 3:01
- Language: Hindi
- Label: Enterr10 Television Network

Tracklisting
No.	Title	Length
1.	"Baazi Ishq Ki"
Total length:		2:00

== See also ==
- List of Hindi thriller shows
