= Rang Badalti Odhani =

- Written by: Aparajita Sharma; Damini K Shetty; Rajiv Pandey; Swati Pande; Sharad Tripathi
- Directed by: Swapna Waghmare Joshi; Mukesh Dubey; Arshad Khan
- Starring: Karan Tacker; Yashashri Masurkar; See below
- Theme music composer: Shankar–Ehsaan–Loy
- Opening theme: "Rang Badalti Odhani" performed by Shankar Mahadevan and "Akruti Kakkar"
- Country of origin: India
- Original language: Hindi
- No. of seasons: 2
- No. of episodes: 365

Production
- Producers: Yash Patnaik; Swapna Waghmare Joshi
- Editors: Kshitija Khandagale; Sandip Ambekar
- Camera setup: Multi-camera
- Running time: approximately 25 minutes
- Production company: Beyond Dreams Entertainment Limited

Original release
- Network: STAR One
- Release: 5 April 2010 – 22 July 2011

Rang Badalti Odhani is a Hindi-language Indian soap opera that aired on STAR One Monday to Saturday evenings. The show premiered on 5 April 2010. It starred Karan Tacker and Yashashri Masurkar in the lead roles and was produced under the banner of Beyond Dreams Entertainment and Inspire Films by Yash A Patnaik. The series showcased performances of the leads on various iconic Bollywood numbers that garnered attention at the time.

== Overview ==
Khanak (Yashashri Masurkar) is a simple, spirited young woman hailing from a small village named Dhulwad in Bhuj, (Gujarat), newly married to her sweetheart, Suraj (Harpreet Singh). In a tragic accident, Suraj is killed. The man who caused Suraj's death is Shantanu Khandelwal (Karan Tacker), the younger son of a business tycoon called Sunil Khandelwal (Aliraza Namdar). Under pressure from the village council (panchayat) of Dhulwad, Shantanu marries Khanak and takes her to his home in the city. Khanak struggles to adjust to the unfamiliar environment, while Shantanu learns to accept his responsibilities. Meanwhile, Shantanu's arrogant mother Madhavi (Rushali Arora) and sister-in-law Khushboo (Khushboo Grewal) conspire to separate him from Khanak. They fail in their attempts as Shantanu and Khanak eventually fall in love with one another. How Khanak becomes a loved member of the family despite it all, and love blossoms between her and Shantanu form the crux of the story.

== Cast ==
=== Main ===
- Karan Tacker as Shantanu Khandelwal
- Yashashri Masurkar as Khanak Shantanu Khandelwal

=== Recurring ===
- Rucha Gujarathi as Natasha
- Ansha Sayed as Jenny
- Harpreet Singh as Suraj / Sunny
- Pankaj Dheer as Sarpanch
- Sahil Anand as Akshay Khandelwal
- Shivani Gosain as Hetal
- Khushboo Grewal as Khushboo Khandelwal
- Aliraza Namdar as Sunil Khandelwal
- Rushali Arora as Madhavi Sunil Khandelwal
- Priyanka Bassi as Samaira
- Rushad Rana as Akshay Khandelwal
- Manish Raisinghani as Rahul Khanna
- Madhurima Tuli as Khushi
- Jaskaran Gandhi as Duck
- Karan Godhwani as Adi
- Garima Bhatnagar as Simran
- Bhavana Balsavar as Gangu Bai later replaced by Sukanya Kulkarni as Gangu Bai
- Priyanka Chibber as Natasha
- Drashti Dhami as Geet
- Sidharth Shukla as Veer

=== Guest ===
- Manini Mishra as Saraswati
- Hiten Tejwani as Anand Mittal

== Music ==
The score of Rang Badalti Odhani is composed and orchestrated by Shankar–Ehsaan–Loy which received the award for Best Title Music/Song Track at the 11th Indian Television Academy Awards. Besides the score, there are two songs - "Rang Badalti Odhani", the opening theme, and "Hua Mann Bawra", where one of the leads perform in a concert. "Hua Mann Bawra" features Ehsaan Noorani of the composer trio.

Song	Singer(s)	Duration
Rang Badalti Odhani	Shankar Mahadevan, Akriti Kakkar	5:05
Hua Mann Bawra	Shankar Mahadevan, Akriti Kakkar	3:45
