= Dear Ishq =

Indian soap opera

- Genre: Drama; Romance
- Created by: Yash A Patnaik
- Based on: Write Me A Love Story (2021)
- Written by: Mamta Yash Patnaik
- Screenplay by: Manoj Tripathi
- Story by: Niranjan Iyengar; Jessica Khurana
- Directed by: Atif Khan
- Creative director: Muskan Baraja
- Starring: Sehban Azim; Niyati Fatnani
- Theme music composer: Reenam Jain
- Composer: Anish John
- Country of origin: India
- Original language: Hindi
- No. of seasons: 1
- No. of episodes: 60

Production
- Executive producers: Gaurav Banerjee; Dimpi Dey; Nilamber Majumdar; Namrata Roy; Nimai Bali; Amit Chandra
- Producers: Yash A Patnaik; Mamta Patnaik
- Cinematography: Nidhin Valanday
- Editors: Rakesh Lal Das; Santosh Patel
- Running time: 20-31 minutes
- Production companies: Beyond Dreams Entertainment; Inspire Films

Original release
- Network: Disney+ Hotstar
- Release: 26 January – 4 April 2023

Dear Ishq (transl. Dear Love) is an Indian Hindi-language romantic drama television serial that premiered on 26 January 2023 on the Disney+ Hotstar streaming service. Produced by Yash A Patnaik and Mamta Patnaik under the banner Beyond Dreams Entertainment and Inspire Films, it stars Sehban Azim and Niyati Fatnani.

== Premise ==
Abhimanyu is a noted romantic fiction writer with a huge female fan following. He is moody, arrogant and rude with his remarks. He gets into an argument with Asmita Roy who is a literary editor, sharing different ideologies about love and fiction. How these two loggerheads fall into love forms the rest of the story!

The season one end with Abhimanyu getting falsely accused for a murder and feels betrayed by his girlfriend Asmita due to a misunderstanding. He's shown starting to write a new story titled "Killer Ishq" in vengeance.

== Cast ==
=== Main ===
- Niyati Fatnani as Asmita Roy : Abhimanyu's love interest
- Sehban Azim as Abhimanyu Razdan : Asmita's love interest

=== Recurring ===
- Kishwer Merchant as Maya Costa
- Puneet Tejwani as Peter Costa
- Kunal Verma as Rizwan Khan
- Buneet Kapoor as Shauvik Sen
- Tanya Nisha Sharma as Shalini Vats
- Sanjeev Seth as Raman Razdan
- Roma Bali as Nita Razdan
- Jyoti B Mukherji as Sharmila Roy
- Beena Banerjee as Charulata Roy
- Sugandh Dhindaw as Bani Kapoor
- Shamikh Abbas as Bijoy Roy
- Kaveri Ghosh as Bindoo Sen
- Preetesh Manas as Anirban Das
- Sandeep Soni as Nannu, Abhimanyu's servant
- Viyanna Dadwani as Pia Costa
- Simran Rawal as Arya
- Gagan Deep as Dev
- Priya Shukla as Receptionist
- Shiv Pathak as Peon
- Kalpesh Rajgor as Cafe Owner
- Brijesh Mourya as Waiter

== Production ==
The series was announced on Disney+ Hotstar by Beyond Dreams Entertainment. It is based on Ravinder Singh's Write Me A Love Story (2021). Sehban Azim and Niyati Fatnani were signed as the lead. The principal photography of the series commenced began in January 2023 and wrapped up in April 2023. It was mainly shot at the Film City, Mumbai. The promo featuring the leads was released on 17 January 2023.

== Reception ==
OTT Play reviewed the first episodes, where it sharply criticized the show for being cliched, having lack of focus, and questionable camera shots. They felt it was more in line with a typical Hindi television show than a web series.

Dhaval Roy of The Times of India rated the series 3/5 stars.

== See also ==
- List of Disney+ Hotstar original programming
