= Niyati Fatnani =

Indian television actress

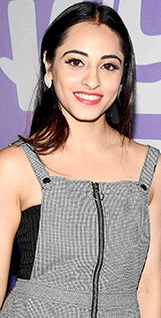
- Fatnani in 2020
- Born: 11 January 1991 (age 35); Rajkot, Gujarat, India
- Occupation: Actress
- Years active: 2016–present
- Known for: Nazar

Niyati Fatnani (born 11 January 1991) is an Indian actress working in Hindi television. She made her acting debut with D4-Get Up and Dance (2016), portraying Niharika Sinha. Fatnani is best known for her portrayal of Piya Rathod in the Star Plus supernatural series Nazar. In 2024, she participated in Fear Factor: Khatron Ke Khiladi 14.

== Early life ==
She was born on 11 January 1991 in Rajkot, Gujarat, India. She completed her early education at Amar Jyoti Saraswati International School located in Bhavnagar, Gujarat. She is also a professional Kathak dancer. Fatnani has a younger sister named Barkha Fatnani.

== Career ==
Fatnani made her acting debut in 2016 with D4 - Get Up and Dance where she played Niharika "Baby" Sinha alongside Utkarsh Gupta. In 2017, she portrayed Dharmavidya Raidhan Katara / Arundhati / Mukhiyani in Yeh Moh Moh Ke Dhaagey alongside Eijaz Khan. From 2018 to 2020, Fatnani portrayed Piya Sharma Rathod in Nazar opposite Harsh Rajput which proved as a major turning point in her career. She also played Piya in the telefilm Ankahee Dastaan in 2021. In 2022, Fatnani portrayed Ginni Garewal Singh in Channa Mereya opposite Karan Wahi. In 2023, she was seen in Disney+ Hotstar's Dear Ishq as Asmita Roy opposite Sehban Azim.

== Filmography ==
=== Television ===
Year	Title	Role	Notes	Ref.
2016	Pyaar Tune Kya Kiya	Shazia	Season 8, Episode 1	
2016	D4-Get Up and Dance	Niharika "Baby" Sinha		
2017	Yeh Moh Moh Ke Dhaagey	Aru / Dharmavidya Raidhan Katara		
2018–2020	Nazar	Piya Sharma Rathod		
2022	Channa Mereya	Ginni Garewal Singh		
2023	Tere Ishq Mein Ghayal	Avantika	Cameo appearance	
2024	Fear Factor: Khatron Ke Khiladi 14	Contestant	8th place	

=== Web series ===
Year	Title	Role	Notes	Ref.
2023	Dear Ishq	Asmita Roy	Web debut	
2023	Fuh se Fantasy	Shobhita Sharma	Episode: "Fantasy Unleashed!"	
2025	Rose Garden	Simran	Hungama OTT	

=== Music video appearances ===
Year	Title	Singer	Ref.
2018	Wahin	Mohit Gaur	
2024	Defender	Sukh E, Avvy Sra, Gulrej Akhtar	

== Awards and nominations ==
Year	Award	Category	Show	Result	Ref.
2022	Indian Television Academy Awards	Best Actress (Popular)	Channa Mereya	Nominated	

== See also ==
- List of Hindi television actresses
- List of Indian television actresses
