= Gauna =

Hindu ceremony

Gauna is a northern Indian Hindu custom and the ceremony associated with the consummation of marriage prevalent in the states of Bihar, Uttar Pradesh and Rajasthan. It is associated with the custom of child marriage. The ceremony takes place several years after marriage. Before the ceremony, the bride stays at her natal home. Marriage is considered only as a ritual union and conjugal life begins only after gauna; that is marriage is consummated only after the gauna ceremony.

== In popular culture ==
A 1950 Hindi movie carried the title Gauna. It was directed by Aamian Chakaravarty, produced by Jagat Pictures, and its music directed by Husanlal Bhagtram. The plot of the Hindi television serials Agle Janam Mohe Bitiya Hi Kijo, Balika Vadhu and Gauna – Ek Pratha mention the practice.
