= Kunal Bakshi =

Indian television actor

- Born: 6 June 1986 (age 39); Jammu, India
- Occupation: Actor
- Spouse: Ababeel Bakshi (m. 2018)

Kunal Bakshi is an Indian television actor best known for playing Mythological Characters in the serials. Mainly portraying Devraj Indra in Karmaphal Daata Shani to many more.

== Television ==
Year	Title	Role	Notes	Ref.
2007	Ssshhhh...Koi Hai: Dhruvtaal		Season 2; Episode 7	
2009	Meera	Ratan Singh		
2012	Dekha Ek Khwaab	Jagat Singh Rathore		
2013	Adaalat	Jamshed Irani/Satish Tyagi		
2013	Junoon – Aisi Nafrat Toh Kaisa Ishq	Inspector Hooda		
2013	SuperCops vs Supervillains	Sahil		
2013	SuperCops vs Supervillains	Vikram/Lion		
2013	SuperCops vs Supervillains	Noori		
2013	SuperCops vs Supervillains	Mandar		
2014	Emotional Atyachar			
2014	Sadda Haq	Rana		
2014	Sadda Haq	Inspector Hooda		
2014	Encounter	Avinash Salunkhe		
2014	Singhasan Battisi	Samant		
2014	Ek Boond Ishq			
2014	Savdhaan India	Dr. Karan	Episode 821	
2014	Savdhaan India	Karan	Episode 1397	
2014	Bharat Ka Veer Putra – Maharana Pratap	Pir Muhammad		
2014	Kahi Suni	Lord Brahma		
2015	Aahat			
2015	Baal Veer	Hubahu		
2015	Aahat			
2015	C.I.D	Vijay		
2015	Suryaputra Karn	Ashwathama		
2016	Sankat Mochan Mahabali Hanumaan	Yuddhajit		
2016–2018	Karmaphal Daata Shani	Lord Indra		
2018	Mahakali – Anth Hi Aarambh Hai	Andhakasura		
2019	RadhaKrishn	Lord Indra		
2020	Shrimad Bhagwat Mahapuran	Ravana		
2020	Devi Adi Parashakti	Lord Indra		
2021	Baalveer Returns	King Emaaya Egypt Evil		
2021–2022	Baal Shiv – Mahadev Ki Andekhi Gatha	Lord Indra		
2023–2024	Karmadhikari Shanidev	Lord Indra		
2024–2025	Shrimad Ramayan	Vibhishana		
2024–2025	Shiv Shakti – Tap Tyaag Tandav	Lord Indra		
2024	Lakshmi Narayan – Sukh Samarthya Santulan	Lord Indra		
2025	Veer Hanuman - Bolo Bajrang Bali Ki Jai	Pawandev		
