= Gauna – Ek Pratha =

2023 Indian drama television series

- Genre: Drama; Social issue
- Created by: Yash A Patnaik
- Based on: Gauna
- Screenplay by: Gurmeet Kaur Udayan
- Story by: Mamta Patnaik; Gurmeet Kaur Udayan
- Directed by: Ismail Umar Khan
- Starring: Krutika Desai; Rohit Purohit
- Country of origin: India
- Original language: Hindi
- No. of seasons: 1
- No. of episodes: 150

Production
- Producer: Yash A Patnaik
- Camera setup: Multi-camera
- Running time: 22-24 minutes
- Production companies: Beyond Dreams Entertainment; Inspire Films

Original release
- Network: Shemaroo Umang
- Release: 10 July – 30 December 2023

Gauna – Ek Pratha (transl. Gauna - a Custom) is an Indian Hindi-language Drama television series that premiered on 10 July 2023 on Shemaroo Umang. It stars Krutika Desai and Rohit Purohit. This show was produced by Yash A Patnaik and Mamta Patnaik under the banner of Beyond Dreams Entertainment and Inspire Films.

== Plot ==
A woman marries her childhood lover under Gauna pratha, He decides to pursue his dreams. After she grows older, will he come to claim her, or will he lose his love for her?

== Cast ==
- Krutika Desai as Gehna Singh Chaudhary
- Rohit Purohit as Gaurav Shukla
- Akhil Vaid as Dheeraj Singh Chaudhary
- Parvati Sehgal as Urvashi Singh Chaudhary
- Nirbhay Thakur
- Ankit Sharma
- Jatin Shah as Vansh Agnihotri
- Yogendra Kumeria as Mahendra Singh Chaudhary
- Papiya Sengupta as Sudha Mahendra Singh Chaudhary
- Rohit Chaudhary as Teja

== Production ==
The series was announced on Shemaroo Umang by Inspire Films. Rohit Purohit and Krutika Desai were signed as the leads. The first promo was released in June 2023. The plot of the show mention the Gauna practice.
