= Jyotsna Chandola =

Indian television actress

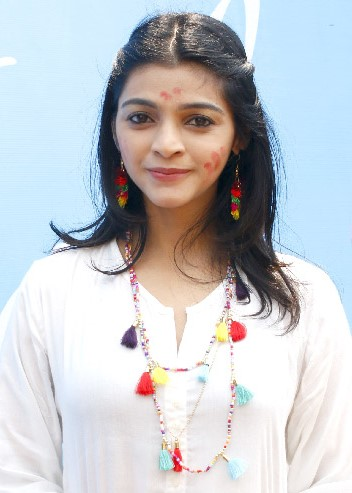
- Chandola at Holi Invasion party in 2018
- Born: India
- Occupation: Actress
- Years active: 2009–Present
- Spouse: Nitesh Singh (m. 2015)

Jyotsna Chandola is an Indian television and film actress known for playing Khushi Bharadwaj in Colors TV's Sasural Simar Ka. Age 28

== Television ==
Year	Show	Role	Ref
2009-2011	Kasak	Shilpa	
2010	Bhagonwali-Baante Apni Taqdeer	Maha Devi Pandey	
2012	Mrs. Kaushik Ki Paanch Bahuein	Anamika	
2012-2017	Sasural Simar Ka	Khushi Sankalp Bharadwaj / Billo Rani	
2014	Savdhaan India		
2014	Crime Patrol		
2015	Jodha Akbar	Maan Bai	
2016	Santoshi Maa	Bitto	
2017	Agnifera	Rajjo	
2018-2019	Muskaan	Sapna	
2022- 2023	Sindoor Ki Keemat	Anamika/Priya	
2023	Baazi Ishq Ki	Palak Agnivanshi / Niharika Mishra	
2024-2025	Kumkum Bhagya	Panchi "Khushi" Kohli Randhawa	
