= Control Room (TV series) =

Indian Hindi-language television series

- Genre: Crime; Thriller
- Created by: Yash A Patnaik; Mamta Yash Patnaik
- Written by: Mamta Yash Patnaik; Shashwat Rai
- Starring: Nishant Malkani; Rahil Azam
- Country of origin: India
- Original language: Hindi
- No. of seasons: 1
- No. of episodes: 8

Production
- Producers: Yash A Patnaik; Mamta Yash Patnaik
- Production location: Mumbai
- Camera setup: Multi camera
- Running time: 45 min
- Production company: Beyond Dreams Entertainment

Original release
- Network: Dangal TV
- Release: 13 August – 4 September 2022

Control Room is an Indian Hindi-language crime thriller television series which will be aired on Dangal TV under the banner of Beyond Dreams Entertainment. It stars Nishant Singh Malkani, Samiksha Jaiswal and Rahil Azam.

== Cast ==
- Nishant Singh Malkani as ACP Ayushman Sharma
- Samiksha Jaiswal as ACP Sugandha Singh
- Rahil Azam as Lawyer Mohit Chettani.
- Shivangi Verma as Forensic Expert Nazneen
- Anand Suryavanshi as DCP Shantanu Vyas
- Cheshta Bhagat as Inspector Varsha Marathe
- Akash Talvar as Inspector Anuj Raikar
- Mohit Chauhan as Commissioner Vishwas Rao Patil
- Saurabbh Ravi Dutta as Shakil Khan
- Ajay Kumar Nain
- Aashish Kaul
- Navina Bole
- Kavith Dutt

== Awards and nominations ==
Year	Award	Category	Result	Ref.
2023	Indian Telly Awards	Best Crime Show	Won	

== See also ==
- List of programmes broadcast by Dangal TV
- List of Hindi thriller shows
