= Channel V India =

Indian television channel

Channel [V] India
- Country: India
- Broadcast area: South Asia and the Middle East
- Headquarters: Mumbai, Maharashtra, India

Programming
- Languages: English; Hindi
- Picture format: 576i (SDTV), 1080i (HDTV)

Ownership
- Owner: Disney Star

History
- Launched: 27 May 1994; 32 years ago (as Channel [V] South)
- Closed: 15 September 2018; 7 years ago
- Replaced by: Star Sports 3

Links
- Website: www.channelv.in

Channel [V] India was an Indian television channel affiliated to the international Channel [V] launched on 27 May 1994, as Channel [V] South Beam on the AsiaSat 2 satellite. The channel owned by STAR India and 21st Century Fox broadcasts a mix of music and original fiction programs. It went from an international music channel in its early days to a music driven one to a youth-oriented entertainment one.

On 1 July 2012, Channel [V] India discontinued music programming. However, Channel [V] International continue to air music programming in India for those with C/Ku band satellite dishes until its cessation on 1 October 2021. It started focusing on original content through fiction dailies and studio formats that addressed youth issues. However On 30 June 2016, the channel discontinued fiction dailies and studio formats and reverted to a 24-hour music-channel format.

On 1 August 2016, the channel changed its look and logo and continued music programming which plays the latest Indian and International hits catering to the Indian youth. The channel was shut down on 15 September 2018 and Star Sports relaunched Star Sports 3 for the first time in 2013.

== Programming ==
- Artist Tree
- Axe Ur Ex
- Best Friends Forever?
- The Buddy Project
- Cabaret
- Catch 22
- Channel V Freedom Express
- Channel V Jammin
- Channel V Presents Bollywood Nonsensex
- Coke V Popstars
- Confessions of an Indian Teenager
- Crazy Stupid Ishq
- D4
- Dance with V
- Dare 2 Date
- Dil Dosti Dance
- Friends: Conditions apply
- Get Gorgeous
- Gumrah: End of Innocence
- Hit Machine
- Humse Hai Liife
- Ishq Unplugged
- It's Complicated – Relationships Ka Naya Status
- Jhalli Anjali Ke Tootey Dil Ki Amazing Story
- The Juice
- Late Night V
- Mastaangi
- Meri Life Meri Choice
- Million Dollar Girl
- Most Wanted
- O Gujariya: Badlein Chal Duniya
- Paanch 5 Wrongs Make A Right
- PS I hate you
- Roomies
- Sadda Haq
- Secret Diaries
- Simpoo
- Stay Tuned
- Suvreen Guggal – Topper of The Year
- Swim Team
- Tony B Show
- Twist Wala Love
- The Udham Singh Show
- V Day Trippin with the Stars
- V Distraction
- V Hangover
- V International
- V Non-Stop
- V The Player
- V Rush
- V The Serial
- V Shuffle
- Videocon Flashback
- Winner Mangta Hai
- Ye Parindey
- Yeh Jawani Ta Ra Ri Ri

== Notable VJs ==
- Ruby Bhatia
- Raageshwari Loomba
- Vekeana Dhillon
- Vikram Dhillon
- Aditya Roy Kapoor
- Laila Rouass
- Anuradha Menon (Lola Kutty)
- Sarah-Jane Dias
- Meghna Reddy
- Nina Manuel
- Anushka Manchanda
- Juhi Pande
- Shruti Seth
- Gaurav Kapur
- Ranvir Shorey
- Vinay Pathak
- Suchitra Pillai
- VJ Andy
- Luke Kenny
- VJ Yudhistir
- Manish Makhija (Udham Singh)
- Purab Kohli
- Sophiya Haque
- V Bai
- VJ Nonie
- Kim Jagtiani
- Jaaved Jaaferi

== See also ==
- MTV India
- VH1
