= Cambala Investigation Agency =

- Created by: Arshad Syed; Abhimanyu Singh
- Written by: Arshad Syed
- Story by: Arshad Syed
- Directed by: Nitin Kakkad
- Music by: Sunil Kaushik
- Country of origin: India
- Original language: Hindi
- No. of seasons: 2

Production
- Running time: 60 minutes
- Production companies: Inspire Films; Contiloe Entertainment

Original release
- Network: Pogo TV
- Release: 29 October 2007 – 2009

Cambala Investigation Agency (or CIA for short) is a television series broadcast on Indian television station Pogo TV. The C.I.A. consists of five children who live in a fictitious town called Cambala and solve numerous crimes. Each of the five kids also has his or her own special talent. They generally solve cases before the town's police inspector, D. L. K.

== Cast ==
- Aditya Kapadia as Ishaan Mehra
- Aditya Singh Rajput as Rohit Ghosh
- Amin Gazi as Farhan Siddiqui
- Freishia Bomanbehram as Sucheta Duggar
- Sheena Bajaj as Nikki Mehra (season 1)
- Jasmine Alaap Singh as Nikki Mehra (season 2)
- Atul Parchure as Inspector D.L. Kulkarni "DLK"
