= Jaana Na Dil Se Door =

Indian television series

- Genre: Drama
- Created by: Prateek Sharma; Star India Pvt. Ltd.
- Written by: Mrinal Jha; Shilpa F D'Mello
- Directed by: Rahib Siddiqui, Jagrut Mehta
- Starring: Vikram Singh Chauhan; Shivani Surve; Shashank Vyas
- Theme music composer: Krsna Solo
- Country of origin: India
- Original language: Hindi
- No. of seasons: 10
- No. of episodes: 418

Production
- Producers: Yash A Patnaik; Mamta Yash Patnaik
- Production locations: Ajmer; Jaipur; Delhi
- Camera setup: Multi camera
- Production companies: Beyond Dreams Entertainment; Inspire Films Private Limited

Original release
- Network: StarPlus
- Release: 9 May 2016 – 30 June 2017

Jaana Na Dil Se Door (English: Don't Go Away From My Heart) is an Indian television series that had aired on StarPlus. It stars Vikram Singh Chauhan, Shivani Surve and Shashank Vyas in lead roles. The cast also includes Sara Khan, Smita Bansal, Vineet Kumar and Shilpa Tulaskar in prominent roles. The series concluded on 30 June 2017.

== Plot ==
Vividha lives a contented life in Ajmer, where her father, Kailash Kashyap, is her role model. Atharv is a disciplined, lower middle-class man who is a feminist and loves his mother dearly, which is completely the opposite for his family. Atharv plans to open a dairy business and often clashes with Kailash. He also saves Guddi in a scuffle, and the same for Vividha, so she realizes he's a good person. Atharv's calf gets stolen, and he and Vividha go to the Pushkar Mela to save the calf, where they bond in a fight from saving the cow. Over time, Atharv falls in love with her and declares that he will marry her once he establishes his business. Kailash, however, disapproves, as he believes that relationships are possible only between individuals of equal social status. Since Atharv lacks social standing and a paternal surname, Kailash considers him unsuitable for Vividha. On the other hand, Vividha’s family finds him dashing and awesome. He frames Atharv for a crime and has him arrested. To secure his release, Atharv's mother Sujata is compelled to give up her house and leave the city with her son.

Kailash arranges Vividha's marriage into a wealthy family, but she prevents Sujata and Atharv from leaving. Atharv and Sujata still have a tabeli in the property and a piece of a small store-room land in front of the house, and Vividha slowly realises her love for Atharv. Soon after, Atharv's father, Colonel Ramakant Vashisht, returns home gravely ill. He promises to unite Atharv and Vividha, but dies before his wish can be fulfilled. Kailash manipulates the situation by convincing Ramakant's second family that his last wish was for Vividha to marry their son Ravish, and the alliance is fixed.

Although Kailash pretends to support Atharv and Vividha's marriage, on the wedding day, he deceives them and arranges Vividha's marriage with Ravish in Delhi. Vividha and Atharv find out about his truth, but Kailash attacks Atharv. Atharv gets the upper-first by managing to defeat them, but at the end Kailash's men attack Atharv with rods and sticks, leaving him critically injured. Ankit also smashes a hammer on his head. Believing Atharv to be killed if she doesn't agree, Vividha agrees to marry Ravish out of compulsion. He goes on a mission, and Vividha hopes he doesn't come out safely.

After marriage, Vividha remains hostile towards Ravish, who struggles to understand her behaviour. Ravish and his family treat her with kindness, and eventually, she learns that Atharv is alive but mentally unstable due to Kailash's assault. Ravish shelters Atharv and Sujata secretly in his house, later revealed to be his half-brother and stepmother. Despite the truth, Vividha continues to live in Ravish's household, torn between her obligations and her love for Atharv.

As events unfold, family conflicts, betrayals, and external threats such as terrorist attacks test the characters. Ravish learns of Vividha's love for Atharv and, though heartbroken, supports their reunion. Over time, secrets regarding property inheritance, family rivalries, and multiple conspiracies emerge. Suman becomes hurt by saying Ravish's pain, whereas Vipul and Kalindi are greedy for inheritance. Guddi supposedly dies from a murder, while Dadaji tries to drown Vividha in a lake. Atharv reaches the spot, beats him, and regains his memory for a few seconds before Dadaji hits him on the head and kicks him in the deep lake.

Believing Atharv to be dead after the accident, Vividha is heartbroken. Later, Atharv returns, creating further emotional turmoil. He gets to know Ravish and the Vashisht family are his family. He tries to reunite Ravish and Vividha, but eventually gets convinced ro marry Vividha himself, as he realizes Vividha loves him. But, he meets a fatal bike accident. The story takes a four-year leap, showing Vividha, Ravish, and their son Madhav living together in Ajmer with the Kashyap family. Guddi is revealed to be alive, while Atharv, now known as Raghav Suman, is manipulated by Guddi and Suman and brainwashed by them. The truth about Madhav's parentage eventually comes out, as Atharv is his father, leading to renewed conflict between the families. Atharv and Vividha marry each other, finally, and they all move back to the Vashisht House.

Later, a woman named Kangana enters the Vashisht House as she meets an accident with Ravish’s car, revealed to be Madhav's biological mother and a pawn of Kailash’s manipulation. Kailash switched Vividha and Kangana’s babies, meaning Madhav is her child. She initially seeks revenge but eventually reforms and marries Ravish for Madhav's custody. Atharv and Vividha's real daughter, Khushi gets found, but turns out to be non-verbal and doesn't know how to properly live with humans, as Kailash raised her as an animal. She, however, learns by seeing Madhav.

However, Kailash resurfaces, as Vividha brings him into the Vashisht House, as she believes he's mentally unstable, and he manipulates circumstances to separate Atharv and Vividha once again. Ravish and Atharv try to expose him, but fail to do so as Vividha prevents them. Ravish tries to expose him by giving him a dose, setting up a camera, and trying to expose Kailash to save his beloved family. This culminates in Kailash murdering Ravish, stabbing him when he opens the door, and he pulls the knife. Even though he tries to fight back, Ravish falls to his death on the floor. Vividha thinks Khushi did it, so takes the blame but Atharv gets bail. The entire Kashyap and Vashisht family go on a mission to expose him and find Kangana, who he has kidnapped, and Khushi helps them. Atharv finds the camera in the basement, where Kailash knocks him, and bombs the house, while Kangana gets found. Madhav gets kidnapped and Vividha gets forced to marry another guy but Atharv tracks them down to save them. Eventually, Atharv exposes Kailash's misdeeds. In the final confrontation, Atharv defeats him and beats him up for everything he’s done to ruin their lives, in which Kailash takes his own life.

The show concludes with a three-month leap, showing the Vashisht and Kashyap families live peacefully in the Ajmer House, while Khushi learns how to talk, and they continue cherishing the memories of Ravish and Ramakant and live happily ever after.

== Cast ==
=== Main ===
- Vikram Singh Chauhan as Atharv Vashisht: Ramakant and Sujata's son; Amarkant's grandson; Kalindi's nephew; Vipul's cousin; Suman's step son; Ravish and Aditi's half brother; Vividha's husband; Khushi's father; Madhav's foster father; Indumati's grandson-in-law; Kailash and Uma's son-in-law; Ankit and Guddi's brother-in-law (2016–2017)
- Shivani Surve as Vividha Kashyap Vashisht: Uma and Kailash's elder daughter; Indumati's granddaughter; Shweta and Ankit's elder sister; Amarkant's granddaughter-in-law; Ramakant and Sujata's daughter-in-law; Atharv's wife; Khushi's mother; Madhav's foster mother.(2016–2017)
- Shashank Vyas as Ravish Vashisht: Ramakant and Suman's son; Aditi's brother; Amarkant's grandson; Kalindi's nephew; Vipul's cousin; Sujata's stepson; Atharva's step brother; Khushi's paternal uncle; Shweta's fiance; Kangana's husband; Madhav's stepfather (2016–2017)

=== Recurring ===
- Surendra Pal as Brigadier General Amarkant "Dadaji" Vashisht: Ratna's brother; Kalindi and Ramakant's father; Sujata and Suman's father-in-law; Vipul, Atharva, Ravish and Aditi's grandfather; Vividha's grandfather-in-law; Madhav's great grandfather (2016–2017)
- Prashant Bhatt as Colonel Ramakant Vashisht: Amarkant's son; Kalindi's brother; Vipul's maternal uncle; Sujata and Suman's husband; Atharv, Ravish and Aditi's father; Khushi's grandfather (2016)(cameo)
- Shilpa Tulaskar as Sujata Vashisht: Amarkant's daughter-in-law; Ramakant's first wife; Atharv's mother; Vividha's mother-in-law; Ravish and Aditi's step mother; Khushi's grandmother (2016–2017)
- Kenisha Chadha as Khushi Vashisht: Atharva and Vividha's daughter; Indumati's great granddaughter; Ramakant and Sujata's granddaughter; Ravish and Aditi's niece; Madhav's foster sister (2017)
- Smita Bansal as Suman Vashisht: Amarkant's daughter-in-law; Ramakant's second wife; Ravish and Aditi's mother; Atharva's step mother (2016–2017)
- Sara Khan as Kangana "Tara" Vashisht: Ravish's wife; Madhav's biological mother (2017)
- Kabir Shah as Madhav Vashisht: Kangana's biological son; Ravish's stepson; Atharva and Vividha's foster son; Aditi's nephew; Khushi's foster brother, Amarkant's great grandson; Kailash and Uma's grandson; (2017)
- Sana Sayyad as Aditi Vashisht: Amarkant's granddaughter; Ramakant and Suman's daughter; Sujata's step daughter; Ravish's sister; Atharv's step sister; Kalindi's niece; Vipul's cousin; Vividha's sister-in-law; Madhav and Khushi's paternal aunt; Avinash Mehra's girlfriend (2016–2017)
- Aaradhna Uppal as Kalindi Vashisht: Amarkant's daughter; Ramakant's sister; Atharva, Ravish and Aditi's paternal aunt; Vipul's mother; Bhumi's mother-in-law ; (2016–2017)
- Manmohan Tiwari as Vipul Vashisht: Amarkant's grandson; Ramakant's nephew; Kalindi's son; Bhumi's husband; Atharva , Ravish and Aditi's cousin (2016–2017) (dead)
- Bhavini Purohit as Bhumi Vashisht: Amarkant's granddaughter-in-law; Vipul's wife; Kalindi's daughter-in-law (2016–2017)
- Aparna Kanekar as Ratna "Bua Dadi" Vashisht: Amarkant's sister; Ramakant and Kalindi's aunt; Sujata and Suman's aunt-in-law; Vipul, Atharva, Ravish and Aditi's grandaunt; Vividha's grandaunt-in-law; Khushi's great grandaunt (2016–2017)
- Sulakshana Khatri as Indumati Kashyap: Kailash's mother; Uma's mother-in-law; Vividha, Shweta and Ankit's grandmother; Atharva's grandmother-in-law; Khushi's great grandmother (2016–2017)
- Vineet Kumar as Kailash Kashyap: Indumati's son; Uma's husband; Vividha, Shweta and Ankit's father; Atharva's father-in-law; Madhav's foster grandfather (2016–2017)
- Aparna Ghoshal as Uma Kashyap: Kailash's wife; Indumati's daughter-in-law; Vividha, Shweta and Ankit's mother; Atharva's mother-in-law; Khushi's maternal grandmother; Madhav's foster grandmother (2016–2017)
- Nidhi Shah / Priyanka Kandwal as Shweta "Guddi" Kashyap: Kailash and Uma's younger daughter; Indumati's granddaughter; Vividha and Ankit's sister; Atharva's sister-in-law; Madhav and Khushi's maternal aunt; Ravish's fiance (2016–2017)
- Ruslaan Sayed as Ankit Kashyap: Kailash and Uma's son; Indumati's grandson; Vividha and Shweta's brother; Atharva's brother-in-law; Madhav and Khushi's maternal uncle; Madhav's kidnapper; Aditi's molester (2016–2017)
- Pawan Shankar as Dr Rajat Kumar Shastri (2016–2017)
- Firoza Khan as Zeenat "Aruna": A terrorist; Adaa's mother (2016)
- Palak Panchal as Adaa "Chutki": Zeenat's daughter (2016)
- Parvez Magray as Chintu Zaveri: Badri's son; Vividha's supposed groom; Kailash's former henchman (2016–2017)
- Maksood Akhtar as Abdul: Dadajan; Sujata's father figure and guardian (2016;2017)

== Awards and nominations ==
Year	Award	Category	Nominee	Result
2016	Indian Television Academy Awards	Best Actor In A Negative Role	Vineet Kumar	Won
2016	Indian Television Academy Awards	Best Actor -Drama	Vikram Singh Chauhan	Nominated
2016	Indian Television Academy Awards	Digital Male	Vikram Singh Chauhan	Nominated
2017	Perfect Achievers Awards	Best Actor (Male)	Shashank Vyas	Won

== Soundtrack ==
	Title	Composer	Lyrics	Singers	Music	Mixing and Arrangement
Title Track	Thumse Milke aise laga jaise apna koi	Krsna Solo	Sandeep Nath	Kriti Killedaar and Javed Ali	Raja Rasaily	Bharat Goel
Sad song	Thumse Bichadke aisa laga choota sapna koi	Krsna Solo	Sandeep Nath	Kriti Killedaar and Krsna Solo	Raja Rasaily	Bharat Goel
Title song 2	Khoo Na Doon Mein Paake Tumko	N/A	N/A	Armaan Malik and Palak Pucchal	N/A	N/A
