= Main Naa Bhoolungi =

- Written by: Virendra Shahaney; Aparna Shahaney; Swapnil Deshpande; Dr. Vinay Chhawal; Lalsa Verma; Virat Basoya
- Directed by: Anil V. Kumar; Yash Chauhan
- Creative director: Virendra Shahaney
- Composer: Dony Hazarika
- Country of origin: India
- Original language: Hindi
- No. of seasons: 1
- No. of episodes: 157

Production
- Producers: Yash A Patnaik; Mamta Yash Patnaik; Aparna Shahaney; Yash Puri; Virendra Shahaney
- Production location: Mumbai
- Running time: 20 mins
- Production companies: Beyond Dreams Entertainment Private Limited; Dancing Waters

Original release
- Release: 23 December 2013 – 15 August 2014

Main Naa Bhoolungi is an Indian Hindi-language psychological thriller television series created by writer Virendra Shahaney. It aired on Sony TV.

== Plot ==
Shikha Gupta, a smart, kind, and nerdy woman marries Sameer Verma, a successful businessman and have a son together. However, though things seem perfect, Sameer is not who he says he is. His real name is Aditya Jagannath and his marriage with Shikha is just a part of a sinister plan. He is already married to a woman named Madhurima. He plans to murder Shikha and kidnap their son however Shikha survives the murder attempt and aims to reclaim her son and exact revenge against Aditya. Neeraj, Aditya's friend, learns the actual truth of Aditya and promises to help Shikha in her plan.

Shikha undergoes a makeover and takes on a new identity and name - Samaira Seth. She becomes the brand ambassador of the Jaggannath Group and convinces Aditya that she is Samaira and not Shikha. He falls in love with her and tells her what he had done to Shikha however she asks him to prove that Madhurima was behind everything. In order to win Samaira's trust, Aditya gets Madhurima drunk and she confesses to everything. Aditya and Samaira send Madhurima to the mental hospital and then marry.

Aditya discovers that Samaira is Shikha and plans with Madhurima to kill her again. They blackmail her into burying herself alive but when they reach the cliff where Shikha was pushed off by Aditya, Shikha stands there, alive and well. While fighting Neeraj, Aditya falls off the same cliff, hanging on in desperation..Madhurima is arrested. Shikha grabs hold of Aditya's hand but lets go - the same thing he did to her. He falls to his death. Neeraj, who has fallen in love with Shikha at this point, expresses his feelings. She accepts him and the couple walk away hand-in-hand with her son.

== Cast ==
- Aishwarya Sakhuja as Shikha Avinash Gupta / Samaira Seth aka Shikha Sameer Verma / Samaira Aditya Jagannath: Aditya's ex-wife.
- Vikkas Manaktala as Sameer Verma / Aditya Jagannath
- Nigaar Khan as Madhurima Aditya Jagannath: Aditya's wife.
- Avinesh Rekhi as Neeraj Sachdev

== International broadcasting ==
Country	Network	Local title	Series premiere	Timeslot	Episodes
Somalia	Fanproj Series	Ma Illoobi Doono	April 25, 2016	20:00	157
Malaysia	TV3	Main Naa Bhoolungi	July 26, 2018	16:00	79 (Double Episodes)
