= Sadda Haq (TV series) =

Indian television series

- Also known as: Sadda Haq - My Life, My Choice
- Genre: Youth show
- Created by: Anand Sivakumaran
- Written by: Durjoy Datta; Sumrit Shahi; Vikrant; Vishwas; Ranjib
- Screenplay by: Alka Shukla; Dialogue : Sumit Arora
- Directed by: Prateek Shah
- Creative directors: Karishmaa Oluchi (S1); Ameya Kulkarni; Mishrkeshii; Dev; Anil
- Starring: Harshita Gaur; Param Singh; Ankit Gupta
- Music by: Abhijit Das
- Country of origin: India
- Original language: Hindi
- No. of seasons: 2
- No. of episodes: 676

Production
- Executive producer: Nisheeth Neerav Neelkanth
- Producers: Mamta Yash Patnaik; Yash A Patnaik
- Cinematography: Hanoz VK (Hanoz Kerawala)
- Editor: Pankaj Katpal
- Camera setup: Multi-camera
- Running time: 22 minutes
- Production companies: Beyond Dreams Entertainment Pvt Ltd; Inspire Films Pvt Ltd

Original release
- Network: Channel V India
- Release: 25 November 2013 – 30 June 2016

Sadda Haq - My Life, My Choice (transl. Our Rights - My Life, My Choice) is an Indian youth television series that premiered on Channel V India on 25 November 2013. The Times of India said the show features characters from a range of areas across the country that are not common on television shows.

== Cast ==
=== Main ===
- Harshita Gaur as Sanyukta Randhir Singh Shekhawat (née Aggarwal)
- Param Singh as Randhir Singh Shekhawat
- Ankit Gupta as Parth Kashyap
- Gachui Homring as Kaustuki Sherpa
- Chirag Desai as Jignesh Patel
- Nisha Neha Nayak as Vidushi Kumar
- Prince Dua as Khuswant Singh Kohli
- Manik Talwar as Sahil Kataria

=== Recurring ===
- Krip Suri as Prof. Vardhan Suryavanshi
- Gaurav Chopra as Prof. Abhay Singh Ranawat
- Neeraj Khetarpal as Prof. Prem Kumar Chaudhary
- Sejal Shah as Mrs. Anjali Aggarwal
- Aaradhna Uppal as Mrs. Renuka Sanyal
- Mohit Chauhan as Mr. Kishore Aggarwal
- Kushabh Manghani as Ankit Aggarwal
- Harsh Vashisht as Mr. Harshvardhan Shekhawat
- Varun Sharma as Sameer Mittal
- Kunal Bakshi as Rana and Inspector Hooda
- Devish Ahuja as Young Parth Kashyap

=== Main cast ===
- Harshita Gaur as Sanyukta Randhir Shekhawat (née Aggarwal)
- Param Singh as Randhir Singh Shekhawat
- Ashwini Koul as Aryan
- Shabnam Pandey as Sanaya Jha
- Mohak Khurana as Joy Dasgupta
- Sneha Shah as Kritika Narayan Swamy
- Puneett Chouksey as Arjun Khanna
- Ali Merchant as Nirmaan Nambiar
- Charvi Saraf as Tanya
- Afzaal Khan

=== Recurring cast ===
- Simran Kapoor as Becky
- Mridula Choudhury as Mrs. Subramanyam
- Pooja Bisht as Minka
- Nisha Neha Nayak as Vidushi Kumar
- Ankit Gupta as Parth Kashyap
- Mohit Chauhan as Mr. Kishore Aggarwal
- Kushabh Manghani as Ankit Aggarwal
- Aaradhna Uppal as Mrs. Renuka Sanyal
- Harsh Vashisht as Mr. Harshvardhan Shekhawat
- Sharat Sonu as Bablu
- Kunal Singh

== Character Synopsis ==
A brief introduction to some of the characters in the show:

- Harshita Gaur portrays Sanyukta Randhir Singh Shekhawat (née Aggarwal), she tries to overcome all hurdles in her life by stepping into the road not taken. Beautiful, Humble, and Kindhearted and extremely sensible.
- Param Singh portrays Randhir Singh Shekhawat, a sheer genius in his field of study, rude and arrogant yet kind and irresistible. The college's most popular handsome hunk.
- Nisha Neha Nayak portrays Vidushi Kumar, ambitious, aggressive, want achievements by any means necessary.
- Ankit Gupta portrays Parth Kashyap, calm and composed in nature, friendly and matured but his past haunts him every moment.
- Gachui Homring portrays Kaustuki Sherpa, honest, righteous but confused in nature.
- Chirag Desai portrays Jignesh Patel, known as Jiggy in college with a Gujarati lifestyle and accent, career oriented.
- Krip Suri portrays Prof. Vardhan Suryavanshi, the mentor of "Dream Team", genius, aggressive in nature, handles difficult students and forms the "Dream Team".
- Aaradhna Uppal portrays Mrs. Renuka Sanyal, Randhir's mother, a corporate woman and one of the members of board of trustees of FITE.
- Kushabh Manghani portrays Ankit Aggarwal, Sanyukta's elder brother, works in his father's company, supports the male dominance.
- Kunal Bakshi portrays Rana and Inspector Hooda, a corrupt police officer and a criminal.
- Afzaal Khan portrays Vikram Thakur, appointed as the Foreman in Sanyukta's father's company, carries out the internship programme.
- Meer Ali portrays Prof. Vivek Chauhan, appointed as the new mentor of "Dream team", alcoholic, later terminated from the post.
- Gaurav Chopra portrays Prof. Abhay Singh Ranawat, the new mentor of "Dream Team", appointed to groom them for the international college tech fest event, genius but alcoholic due to his troubled past.
- Ali Merchant portrays Nirmaan, a multi-layered intelligent guy and a passionate scientist and the director of "Indian Space Research Centre (ISRC)".

== Production ==
Mamta Yash Patnaik, Producer and Chief Creative Director of Beyond Dreams Production house and co-founder of Inspire films production house says "The audiences are evolving with each passing day. So the content needs to evolve too. The same emotions have to be told in a new refreshing manner which will connect with the youth. We wanted to give a different show not only in terms of content but also make it visually different. The key was to have a play out which is emotional and still not look like any GEC soap."

Yash A Patnaik, chairman and managing director of Beyond Dreams Production house added "It's very exciting to produce youth shows because then you're not doing the regular things that are going on these days. You can break conventions and make your own rules with youth shows. It's a very unexplored space."

== Season synopsis ==
Season	Total no. of episodes	Originally aired	
Season	Total no. of episodes	Season premiere	Season finale
1	537	25 November 2013	25 December 2015
2	116	19 January 2016	30 June 2016

== Plot ==
=== Season 1 ===
Sanyukta Agarwal is a young and talented girl who has the dream to pursue Mechanical Engineering. But her conservative father opposes her decision as he believes Mechanical Engineering is only for boys while girls are meant to get married and do household chores. Sanyukta's mother is very supportive of her dreams but is scared of her husband. Without the knowledge of her parents, Sanyukta gives the entrance test for India's number one college FITE and gets admission. With her mother's signature on the admission form Sanyukta joins FITE. Randhir Singh Shekhawat is a sheer genius and a virtuoso. He often refers to himself as the best. Randhir has anger issues due to a troubled childhood. He is a male chauvinist and believes men are better than women. Randhir and his best friend Karan gives the entrance test together however only Randhir manages to clear it. Karan can get an admission only if one student decides to give up their seat. Upon seeing a few girls in his batch he begins to threaten them to give up their admission or change the stream in order to get Karan an admission. He and Sanyukta get into an altercation and thus begins their rivalry. Sanyukta's father and brother find out about her admission and set out to bring her back home. She intentionally causes a blast in the laboratory which leads to a police investigation as a result of which she's detained at the college thus unable to go back home. Randhir gets furious as Sanyukta traps him in the situation as well. Randhir is very distracted and not using his full intelligence towards the dream team. Vardhan asks Sanyukta to befriend him in order to bring back his attention to where it belongs and to help him overcome his inner problems. Sanyukta is very scekptical about it at first but then agrees. She prepares a scarp book highlighting hers and Randhir's journey so far. Randhir loves the gift and agrees to become her friend.

=== Season 2 ===
Sanyukta visits Parth in a hospital everyday for the past two years. She put her dream of working as a mechanical engineer aside after the international tech fest incident. She works in an IT company along with colleague and IT Engineer Aryan known to all by his desk extension number "235". Aryan falls in love with sanyukta.Her dad regrets for not supporting her dreams. Parth recovers from coma. YoYo opened an auto parts store. Sanyukta's brother and Vidushi are married and they return from Dubai. Sanyukta finally joins ISRC but becomes an intern of the project "Mission Mars 2020" led by Nirmaan, the director of ISRC. Joy, Kritika, Arjun and Sanaya are her colleagues. Meanwhile, Randhir enters ISRC for his friend Sanaya but becomes a member of the project. Randhir meets Sanyukta.

Mars Rover is being built up, the first step towards the mission. Randhir is the mechanical designer, Arjun looks after the suspension mechanics, Kritika is the coder, the logo designing comes under Joy's department and Botanist Sanaya looks after the soil level comparisons. Aryan finally becomes a member of the project and is the special consultant. Vidushi visits Sanyukta at ISRC and open up about Sanyukta's relationship with Randhir in front of her colleagues.

== Awards and recognition ==
Year - 2014

- Indian Telly Awards
  - Youth Show (Fiction) [Won]
  - Actor in a Supporting Role (Drama) - Krip Suri [Nominated]

Year - 2015

- Indian Telly Awards
  - Youth Show [Won]
