= Channa Mereya (TV series) =

Indian television series

- Genre: Drama; Romance
- Created by: Yash A Patnaik
- Developed by: Yash A Patnaik
- Starring: Niyati Fatnani; Karan Wahi
- Opening theme: Channa Mereya by Arijit Singh
- Country of origin: India
- Original language: Hindi
- No. of seasons: 1
- No. of episodes: 110

Production
- Producers: Yash A Patnaik; Mamta Patnaik
- Running time: 20-24 minutes
- Production company: Beyond Dreams Entertainment

Original release
- Network: Star Bharat
- Release: 5 July – 12 November 2022

Channa Mereya (transl. The light of my soul) is an Indian Hindi-language romantic drama television series that premiered on 5 July 2022 on Star Bharat. It digitally streams on Disney+Hotstar. Produced by Yash A Patnaik and Mamta Patnaik under the banner Beyond Dreams Entertainment, it stars Niyati Fatnani and Karan Wahi. The show went off air on 12 November 2022.

== Plot ==
The story actually revolves around the love for cooking and is based on the culture of Punjab. Ginni Garewal is a 24-year-old woman who is full of life. She lives in her own little bubble of chaos and is desperate for a resolution for her family problems and the missing feeling of love. Ginni and her family run a Dhaba in Amritsar. On the other hand, Aditya Singh is a 27-year-old man who aspires to be one of the world's highest hoteliers. He is on a quest for significance and meaning in his life, and he finds the answers in a girl he despises. But then decides to fall in love with her, not knowing his mother is still alive . He marries Ginni.

== Cast ==
=== Main ===
- Niyati Fatnani as Ginni Aditya Raj Singh (née Garewal): Khushwant and Gulraj's daughter; Goldie, Dimpy and Shampy's sister; Aditya's wife
- Karan Wahi as Aditya Raj Singh: Amber and Gurkirat's son; Supreet's step-son; Akash's half- brother; Ginni's husband
  - Swarnim Neema as Child Aditya Singh

=== Recurring ===
- Puneet Issar as Rajwant Singh aka Daarji: Anand and Amber's father; Aditya, Gurleen, Marleen and Akash's grandfather; Khushwant and Sonia's friend
- Shakti Anand as Amber Singh: Rajwant's younger son; Anand's brother; Gurkirat's widower; Supreet's husband; Aditya and Akash's father
- Vishavpreet Kaur as Supreet Amber Singh: Amber's second wife; Akash's mother; Aditya's stepmother; Gurkirat's murderer
- Perneet Chauhan as Gurkirat Amber Singh: Amber's first wife; Aditya's mother; murdered by Supreet (Dead)
- Tanushree Kaushal as Gurraj Garewal: Khushwant's widow; Ginni, Goldie, Dimpy and Shampy's mother
- Kanwalpreet Singh as Goldie Garewal: Khushwant and Gurraj's son; Ginni, Dimpy and Shampy's brother; Simranpreet's husband
- Charu Mehra as Simranpreet Goldie Garewal / Sam Dhillon: Goldie's wife; Aditya's obsessive lover
- Harpal Singh Sokhi as Khushwant Garewal: Ginni, Goldie, Shampy and Dimpy's father; Gurraj's husband; Rajwant's friend (Dead)
- Shardul Pandit as Armaan: Aditya's best friend
- Aashish Kaul as Anand Singh: Rajwant's elder son; Amber's brother; Shailaja's husband; Gurleen and Marleen's father;
- Mamta Verma as Shailaja Anand Singh: Anand's wife; Gurleen and Marleen's mother
- Aanya Rawal as Dimpy Garewal: Khushwant and Gurraj's daughter; Ginni and Goldie's younger sister; Shampy's twin sister
- Jasleen Singh as Shampy Garewal: Khushwant and Gurraj's daughter; Ginni and Goldie's younger brother; Dimpy's twin brother
- Dhriti Goenka as Gurleen Cheema (née Singh): Anand and Shailaja's elder daughter; Marleen's sister; Harjeet's wife
- Dhantejas Pandit as Akash Singh: Amber and Supreet's son; Aditya's younger half-brother; Anand and Shailaja's nephew
- Chirag Bhanot as Harjeet Cheema: Gurleen's husband
- Sonika Gill as Sonia: Rajwant's friend
- Sanjana Solanki as Marleen Singh: Anand and Shailaja's younger daughter; Gurleen's sister
- Aradhana Sharma as Harnaaz Cheema: Aditya's ex-prospective bride
- Nisha Gupta as Ginni's friend

== Production ==
=== Development ===
The show's title is based on the song "Channa Mereya" sung by Arijit Singh from the 2016 film Ae Dil Hai Mushkil. The shooting of the series began in May 2022.

=== Casting ===
Niyati Fatnani and Karan Wahi were cast as the main leads.

== Reception ==
=== Critical reception ===
Channa Mereya received mixed to positive reviews from critics. Gayatri Nirmal of Pinkvilla stated "Channa Mereya is a decent watch and brings along a dash of freshness. Niyati Fatnani's optimism & Karan Wahi's rage grips viewers."

== Awards and nominations ==
Year	Award	Category	Recipient	Result	Ref.
2022	Indian Television Academy Awards	Best Actress (Popular)	Niyati Fatnani	Nominated	
2022	Indian Television Academy Awards	Best Actor (Popular)	Karan Wahi	Nominated	
2022	Indian Television Academy Awards	Best Actor in a Negative Role	Shakti Anand	Won	
2022	Indian Television Academy Awards	Popular Serial (Drama)	Channa Mereya	Nominated	

== See also ==
- List of programs broadcast by Star Bharat
