= Monica Mogre – Case Files =

Indian crime television series

- Also known as: Monica Mogre - Case Files
- Created by: Inspire Films
- Written by: Vinay Choudary
- Starring: see below
- Opening theme: None
- Country of origin: India
- Original language: Hindi
- No. of episodes: 17

Production
- Producer: Yash Patnaik
- Running time: 52 minutes

Original release
- Network: Zee TV
- Release: 10 January – 21 March 2009

Monica Mogre – Case Files is a Hindi-language thriller series on Zee TV, which consists of short stories where Inspector Monica Mogre deals with very dangerous cases involved with crime. The series premiered on 10 January 2009 until 21 March 2009.

The series is produced by Yash Patnaik of Beyond Dreams Productions, and features a series of small crime cases, with each story lasting for about 10 to 12 episodes long.

== Premise ==
The plot revolves around a young 21-year-old Inspector Monica Mogre, who helps the public from dangerous criminals by jeopardizing her own life. In addition, to being a cop, she is the only strength for her parents, who want her to get married. Hence, they don't think too much about their daughter's police career, despite the fact that they are proud of her achievements. Besides, her marriage proposals get rejected every time, due to her being as a cop officer. Therefore, putting her parents into more worries. Her best friend's name is Marisa.

== Cast ==
- Parakh Madan as Inspector Monica Mogre
- as A.C.P. Rana
- Mahesh Manjrekar as Deepraj Mathur
- Sumeet Malhan as Harry Saluja
- Sudhanshu Pandey as Ritwik
- Pramatesh Mehta as Mr. Mogre: Monica's father
