= Payas Pandit =

Indian film Actress

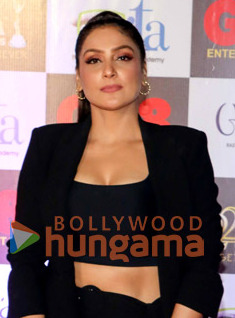
- Payas Pandit at 22nd Indian Television Awards
- Born: 31 December 1991 (age 34); Mirzapur, Uttar Pradesh
- Occupation: Actress
- Years active: 2015
- Known for: Bhojpuri Cinema
- Notable work: Loha Pahalwan
- Television: Bhabiji Ghar Par Hain!

Payas Pandit (born 31 December 1991) is an Indian film actress who works in Bhojpuri language films. She is known for her roles in films like Loha Pahalwan, Takrav, and Bhabiji Ghar Par Hain!.

== Career ==
Pandit embarked on her career in 2012 as an anchor, and came to Mumbai in 2015 in order to feature in a show named Janbaaz Sindbad with Sagar Pictures which was broadcast on Zee TV. She has appeared in small roles in various TV shows, worked as a model and taken part in print shoots, Lakme Fashion Week and Gujarat Fashion Week. In 2016, she made her acting debut in a Bhojpuri film named Loha Pahalwan. Her subsequent films included Takrav, Nagraj and Har Har Mahadev. In 2018, she played a character in a TV show named Karn Sangini which was broadcast on Star Plus. She also worked in the Hindi television industry and gained popularity by playing the role of Poonam in the serial Patiala Babes, Mere Dad Ki Dulhan, and Bhabiji Ghar Par Hain!. In 2019, she worked in ZEE5's web series Bombers and also appeared in a short film, Comedian, which is available on MX Player. In 2020, she featured in the Indian thriller serial Ishq Mein Marjawan 2. In 2021, she played the role of a female police officer in the movie Afate Ishq. At present, her show Bandhan Tute Na is running successfully on ZEE5.

== Political career ==
In 2021, Pandit joined the Aam Aadmi Party (AAP) as an Utter Pradesh State Spokesperson, and she is undertaking a variety of other volunteer work for the benefit of society too.

== Filmography ==
=== Films ===
Year	Film	Language
2018	Loha Pahalwan	Bhojpuri
2018	Takrav	Bhojpuri
2018	Nagraj	Bhojpuri

=== Television ===
Year	Name	Role	Channel	Notes	Ref
2017	Bhabiji Ghar Par Hain!	Rozy	And TV		
2019	Patiala Babes	Poonam	Sony Entertainment Television		
2020	Mere Dad Ki Dulhan	Randeep proposes Niya	Sony Entertainment Television		
2021	Ishq Mein Marjawan 2: Naya Safar	Chanchal	Voot Select		
2023	Molkki - Rishton Ki Agnipariksha		Colors TV		
2023	Chashni	Meher Babbar	Star Plus		

=== Web series ===
All web series are in Hindi Language, otherwise noted the language.

Year	Series	Role	Platform	Notes
2019	Bombers		ZEE5	Fort Et Fier
2020	Shrikant Bashir	Mrs. Vohra	SonyLIV	
