= Helly Shah =

Indian actress (born 1996)

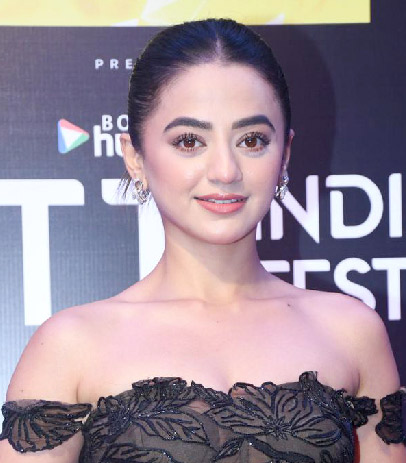
- Shah in 2024
- Born: 7 January 1996 (age 30); Ahmedabad, Gujarat, India
- Occupations: Actress; model
- Years active: 2010–present
- Known for: Swaragini; Devanshi; Sufiyana Pyaar Mera; Ishq Mein Marjawan 2 Ishq Mein Marjawan 2: Naya Safar

Helly Shah (pronounced [ˈɦɛli ʃaːɦ]; born 7 January 1996) is an Indian actress and model who primarily works in Hindi television. She made her acting debut in 2010 with Zindagi Ka Har Rang...Gulaal portraying Talli. She is best known for her portrayal of Swara Bose Maheshwari in Swaragini and Devanshi Bakshi in Devanshi.

Shah earned wider recognition with her dual portrayal of Saltanat and Kaynaat Shah in Sufiyana Pyaar Mera and her portrayal of Riddhima Raisinghania in Ishq Mein Marjawan 2 and the web series Ishq Mein Marjawan 2: Naya Safar.

== Early life ==
Shah is born on 7 January 1996. She is a Gujarati from Ahmedabad, Gujarat and is a vegetarian.

== Career ==
Shah began her acting career when she was in 8th grade. Her career began with Star Plus's show Gulaal. In 2011 she appeared in Diya Aur Baati Hum playing Shruti. She then played Alaxmi in Life OK's Alaxmi - Hamari Super Bahu. Later, she played Ami in Khelti Hai Zindagi Aankh Micholi. She then appeared in Sony Pal's Khushiyon Kii Gullak Aashi.

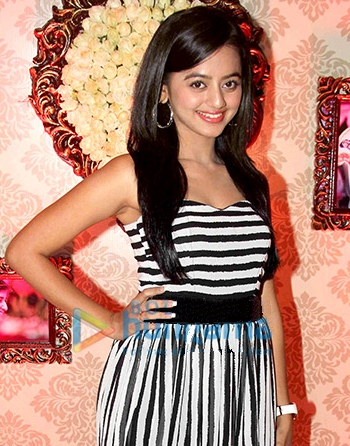
Shah in 2016

From March 2015 to December 2016, Shah portrayed Swara Maheshwari in Swaragini.

In 2016, Shah participated in Colors TV's Jhalak Dikhhla Jaa (season 9). In 2017, she portrayed Devanshi Upadhyay/Bakshi in Devanshi.

In 2019, she portrayed the double role of Saltanat Shah and Kaynaat Shah in Star Bharat's Sufiyana Pyaar Mera. Next, she appeared as Neha in Star Plus's Yeh Rishtey Hain Pyaar Ke.

Shah portrayed Riddhima Raisinghania in Ishq Mein Marjawan 2 opposite Rrahul Sudhir and Vishal Vashishtha, that aired from 13 July 2020 to 13 March 2021 on Colors TV. After the show went off air, the new season titled Ishq Mein Marjawan 2: Naya Safar started to stream in Voot Select since 15 March, with Shah reprising the character of Riddhima.

She made her Cannes red carpet debut on 18 May 2022. She unveiled the poster of her debut film Kaya Palat, at the Cannes Film Festival on 21 May. The actress also walked the red carpet for L’Oréal Paris at Cannes Film Festival, the first Indian television actress to walk for the event sponsors L'Orèal Paris. As of March 2023, Shah is shooting for an upcoming Gujarati film alongside Vatsal Seth.

From March 2025 to June 2025, she played Kajal Thakkar in Colors TV's Zyada Mat Udd opposite Shehzad Shaikh.

== In the media ==
Shah ranked 47th in Eastern Eye's Top 50 Asian celebrities of 2020. In the same year, Eastern Eye listed her in Dynamic dozen for the decade in its 4th position. In 2021, she was ranked in Eastern Eye's Top 30 under 30 Global Asian Stars list. In 2023, she ranked 3rd in Times Now "Popular Television Actresses" list.

== Filmography ==
=== Films ===
Key
†	Denotes films that have not yet been released

Year	Title	Role	Language	Notes	Ref.
2020	Happy Birthday	Saba	Hindi	Short film	
2022	Zibah	Erum	Hindi	Short film	
2025	Surprise	Kruti	Gujarati		
2025	Deda	Khushi	Gujarati		
TBA	Kaya Palat †	TBA	Hindi	Completed	

=== Television ===
Year	Title	Role	Notes	Ref.
2010–2011	Zindagi Ka Har Rang...Gulaal	Talli		
2011	Diya Aur Baati Hum	Shruti		
2012–2013	Alaxmi – Humari Super Bahu	Alaxmi / Laxmi Kapadia		
2013	Khelti Hai Zindagi Aankh Micholi	Ami Joshipura		
2014	Khushiyon Kii Gullak Aashi	Aashi Dubey		
2015–2016	Swaragini – Jodein Rishton Ke Sur	Swara Bose Maheshwari		
2016	Jhalak Dikhhla Jaa 9	Contestant	15th place	
2016–2017	Devanshi	Devanshi Upadhyay Bakshi		
2018	Laal Ishq	Deepali	Episode: "Jhankini"	
2019	Sufiyana Pyaar Mera	Saltanat Shah Khan / Kaynaat Shah		
2020–2021	Ishq Mein Marjawan 2	Riddhima Raisinghania		
2025	Zyada Mat Udd	Kajal Thakkar		

==== Special appearances ====
Year	Title	Role	Ref.
2015	Comedy Nights with Kapil	Herself	
2015	Udaan	Swara Bose Maheshwari	
2015	Sasural Simar Ka	Swara Bose Maheshwari	
2016	Krishnadasi	Swara Bose Maheshwari	
2016	Comedy Nights Live	Swara Bose Maheshwari	
2016	Comedy Nights Bachao	Swara Bose Maheshwari	
2016	Kasam Tere Pyaar Ki	Swara Bose Maheshwari	
2017	Shakti - Astitva Ke Ehsaas Ki	Devanshi Upadhyay Bakshi	
2017	Savitri Devi College & Hospital	Devanshi Upadhyay Bakshi	
2019	Yeh Rishtey Hain Pyaar Ke	Neha	
2020	Choti Sarrdaarni	Riddhima Raisinghania	
2020	Pinjara Khubsurti Ka	Riddhima Raisinghania	

=== Web series ===
Year	Title	Role	Notes	Ref.
2021	Ishq Mein Marjawan 2: Naya Safar	Riddhima Raisinghania		
2024–2026	Gullak	Dr. Preeti Singh	Season 4,5	
2024	Naam Namak Nishan	Dr. Tina		
2024	Pyramid	Vrinda		
2026	Chumbak	Twinkle Ravjiani Oberoi		
2026	Ishqa Ishqa	Arohi		

=== Music videos ===
Year	Title	Singer(s)	Ref.
2021	Halo Re Halo	Payal Dev, Mika Singh	
2022	Ik Kahani	Kaka	
2022	Humko Na Mohabbat Karne De	Gul Saxena, Saaj Bhatt	
2022	Tu Jo Mila	Romy	

== Awards and nominations ==
Year	Award	Category	Work	Result	Ref.
2016	Asian Viewers Television Awards	Best Actress (Popular)	Swaragini - Jodein Rishton Ke Sur	Nominated	
2016	Golden Petal Awards	Best Actress	Swaragini - Jodein Rishton Ke Sur	Won	
2016	Golden Petal Awards	Favourite Jodi (with Varun Kapoor)	Swaragini - Jodein Rishton Ke Sur	Won	
2017	Indian Television Academy Awards	Best Actress (Popular)	Devanshi	Won	
2019	Indian Television Academy Awards	Best Actress in a Negative Role	Sufiyana Pyaar Mera	Won	
2019	Gold Awards	Best Actress in a Negative Role	Sufiyana Pyaar Mera	Won	
2020	Gold Glam and Style Awards	Stylish Actor(Female)Tv	—N/a	Won	
2021	Indian Television Academy Awards	Best Actress (Popular)	Ishq Mein Marjawan 2	Nominated	
2022	Indian Television Academy Awards	Best Actress (Popular)	Ishq Mein Marjawan 2	Nominated	
