= Ishq Mein Marjawan 2: Naya Safar =

Indian thriller drama series

- Genre: Romance; Thriller
- Created by: Yash A Patnaik
- Developed by: Yash A Patnaik
- Screenplay by: Garima Goel
- Story by: Mamta Patnaik
- Directed by: Noel Smith
- Creative director: Manjari Mukul
- Starring: Helly Shah; Rrahul Sudhir
- Theme music composer: Toshi Sharib
- Opening theme: "Ishq Mein Marjawan"
- Composers: Dony Hazarika; Udbhav Ojha
- Country of origin: India
- Original language: Hindi
- No. of seasons: 1
- No. of episodes: 97 (list of episodes)

Production
- Producers: Yash A Patnaik; Mamta Patnaik
- Cinematography: Shanoo Singh Rajput
- Editor: Kshitija Khandagle
- Camera setup: Multi-camera
- Running time: 22 minutes
- Production companies: Beyond Dreams Entertainment; Inspire Films Private Limited

Original release
- Network: Voot Select
- Release: 15 March – 5 July 2021

Related
- Ishq Mein Marjawan; Ishq Mein Marjawan 2 Fanaa: Ishq Mein Marjawan; Fanaa: Ishq Mein Marjawan - Aakhri Imtihaan

Ishq Mein Marjawan 2: Naya Safar (transl. I will die in this love 2: New journey) is an Indian romantic-thriller web series that premiered on Voot Select on 15 March 2021. Produced by Yash A Patnaik, it starred Helly Shah and Rrahul Sudhir. The 97-episode series went off air on 5 July 2021 in India.

== Cast ==
=== Main ===
- Helly Shah as Riddhima Raisinghania
- Rrahul Sudhir as Vansh Raisinghania
- Vishal Vashishtha as Kabir Sharma
- Ankit Siwach as Vyom: Madhuri's husband

=== Recurring ===
- Manasvi Vashist as Aryan Raisinghania
- Chandni Sharma as Ishani Raisinghania
- Zayn Ibad Khan as Angre
- Nikita Tiwari as Sia Raisinghania
- Meenakshi Sethi as Indrani Raisinghania
- Khalida Jaan as Anupriya Raisinghania
- Payas Pandit as Chanchal Rudra Raisinghania
- Kristina Patel as Sara/ Gayatri
- Riya Bhattacharjee as Kiara

== Production ==
In February 2021 Ishq Mein Marjawan 2 announced to move the series to Voot Select. Later it was announced that the series will stream on 15 March 2021 with its new season Ishq Mein Marjawan 2: Naya Safar. In March 2021 Ankit Siwach was introduced as Vyom, a gangster, in the parallel lead role.

The series premiered on Colors Rishtey UK on 29 March 2021. It airs from Monday to Friday 10PM.

In early April 2021, Ankit Siwach tested positive for COVID-19.

The series premiered on Voot USA on 5 April 2021. It streams Monday to Friday.

The series was temporarily shot in Goa due to the COVID-19 curfew from 14 April 2021 to 1 May 2021 in Maharashtra The curfew was extended till 15 May 2021. On 7 May 2021, the Goa government cancelled the permission for shoots due to a rise in the COVID-19 cases.

The series was shot in Siliguri after the lockdown in Goa.

The shooting of the series ended on 9 June 2021.

== Reception ==
=== Ratings ===
In UK the viewership on week ending Sunday 4 April 2021 was 13,400 K viewers, making it the 3rd most-watched serial on Colors Rishtey UK. The Ratings then dropped but it still was the 2nd most watched on Colors Rishtey UK gathering 11,800 K viewers on week ending 16 May 2021. The Viewership increased on week ending Sunday 13 June 2021 with 16,700 K viewers, making it the most watched serial on Colors Rishtey UK.

== Episodes ==
No.	Title	Original release date
1	"Vansh gets a warning"	15 March 2021
As Vansh meets Riddhima, a stranger calls him and warns that Riddhima isn't his anymore.
2	"Whoa! Did Riddhima attack Vansh?"	16 March 2021
Riddhima trespasses into Vansh's room, however, she triggers a burglar alarm and is locked inside.
3	"Riddhima Held At Gun Point"	17 March 2021
Aryan kidnaps Riddhima to extract information about the stolen diamonds, however, she refuses to speak.
4	"Riddhima challenges Vansh!"	18 March 2021
Riddhima confronts that she took the diamonds beside challenging Vansh to shoot her. Meanwhile, Vansh learns that Riddhima is not pregnant.
5	"Vansh gets resentful!"	19 March 2021
Riddhima tries to doze Vansh using sleeping medicine and steals the rifle. However, Vansh discovers about Riddhima and gets resentful. Meanwhile, Aryan tries to prove the culprit.
6	"Vansh To Expose Riddhima?"	20 March 2021
Vansh confronts the family and reveals that Riddhima has stolen the family's valuable possession, an old rifle. Later, Vansh interrogates Riddhima and urges her to reveal the truth about her action.
7	"Vansh Finds Riddhima's look-alike"	22 March 2021
Vansh ends up at Vyom's lair looking for Riddhima and ends up finding a shocking truth about Riddhima's look-alike. Meanwhile, Vyom states what he wants from Vansh.
8	"Who Is The Mystery Girl?"	23 March 2021
Vansh remains stressed to find the diamonds and the family rifle. Adding to the trouble, another shock jolts him when Dadi takes back the control of the family business from him until he makes his decision regarding Riddhima.
9	"Vansh's mission gets sabotaged"	24 March 2021
When Vansh is on a mission to retrieve his black box, Riddhima's doppelganger sabotages his mission and gets away with the black box.
10	"Vansh hides the 'black box'"	25 March 2021
Vansh talks to Angre and informs him that the 'black box' needs to be hidden in a safe location, which Riddhima's doppelganger overhears and figures out the whole plan.
11	"Is Vansh Falling Into Riddhima's Trap?"	26 March 2021
While Vansh confronts Riddhima at gunpoint about her actions, an explosion in the house shocks everyone, leading Vansh to run out and save his family.
12	"Vansh shoots Riddhima!"	27 March 2021
Aryan kidnaps Riddhima and takes her to a secluded forest to kill her. However, in a shocking turn of events, Vansh arrives and shoots Riddhima.
13	"Vansh-Vyom's Final Showdown!"	29 March 2021
Sia reveals to Vyom that Vansh killed Riddhima. Later, Vyom panics when he sees Vansh in his room. Subsequently, Vansh holds Vyom at gunpoint and questions him about Riddhima's whereabouts.
14	"Vansh confronts Riddhima's doppelganger!"	30 March 2021
Vansh reveals to Riddhima's look-alike how he faked her death in front of Aryan and saved her life. Furthermore, he questions her about Riddhima's whereabouts and her plan.
15	"Vansh looks for the caller"	31 March 2021
While Angre guards Riddhima's doppelganger, he gets a call informing that Vansh needs him immediately. But, on reaching, they learn that Angre was misled.
16	"Aryan to expose Vansh?"	1 April 2021
Aryan finds out that Riddhima is alive after uncovering the CCTV footage in Vansh's room. Immediately, he plans to expose Vansh and alerts Daadi about it.
17	"Aryan shoots Angre!"	2 April 2021
Aryan learns about Riddhima's whereabouts and goes in pursuit, with a loaded gun to kill her. A scuffle ensues between Angre and Aryan, and in the midst, Aryan shoots Angre.
18	"Vansh held at gunpoint"	3 April 2021
After Aryan proves to his grandmother that Vansh had lied about Riddhima's demise, Riddhima presents herself to prove him right. Unable to bear the anger, Vansh's grandmother holds him at gunpoint and questions him.
19	"Vansh's futile attempt?"	5 April 2021
While Aryan accepts his crimes of shooting Angre, Ishani falls for his deceit eventually. Meanwhile, Vansh tries his best to decode the 'black box'.
20	"Riddhima receives a courier"	6 April 2021
As requested by Riddhima, Vyom sends a costly pendent to VR Mansion, but Chanchal takes the courier and decides to keep it for herself.
21	"Vansh sets a trap for Riddhima"	7 April 2021
As Vansh suspects Riddhima and feels that she is on a mission to retrieve the black box from him, he lets Riddhima have the password for it so that he can find out what she is up to.
22	"Riddhima is confronted!"	8 April 2021
Vansh tells Riddhima about noticing a rapid change in her behaviour. He confronts her for stealing from her own house and demands the truth, ensuring her of a certain solution to her problem.
23	"Vyom flirts with Sia"	9 April 2021
Indrani threatens Riddhima that she will reveal her and Vansh's secret to Dadi. Meanwhile, Riddhima warns Sia to stay away from Vyom as he is a dangerous man.
24	"Riddhima to spill the beans?"	10 April 2021
During a romantic moment, Riddhima tries to make a shocking revelation to Vansh. However, they get into a heated argument, and Riddhima stops short of making the revelation.
25	"Vansh makes a discovery"	12 April 2021
Riddhima confronts Kiara to find a clue about the secret black box. Later, Vansh learns a horrific secret about Riddhima from his spy.
26	"Vansh gets instigated against Riddhima!"	13 April 2021
Vansh's trust in Riddhima gets low when he finds out that she has been hiding Kabir in captivity. But things turn ugly when Sia instigates him against Riddhima, lying about the latter plotting his fall!
27	"Riddhima is bewildered"	14 April 2021
When Riddhima is about to call Kiara, she is shocked to find her falling from the first floor to the middle of the house. And Vansh concludes that it was a murder attempt, and the perpetrator has not left the house.
28	"Riddhima feels threatened"	15 April 2021
Riddhima finds a note written on the floor with Gulal in the middle of VR Mansion, which says that Riddhima's secrets will soon be exposed to Vansh.
29	"Riddhima suspects Aryan"	16 April 2021
Riddhima suspects Aryan to be Kiara's killer but is unable to figure out his motive behind the murder. She discusses the same with Vansh, who agrees with her suspicion.
30	"Did Aryan kill Kiara?"	17 April 2021
Riddhima manages to hide the message on the mirror from Vansh. Later, Ishani accuses Aryan of murdering Kiara after the image of Kiara's tattoo is found in Ishani's phone.
31	"Vansh falls sick"	19 April 2021
Vansh manages to hide the dead body of Kiara before the police could find out. Meanwhile, Sia runs away from home to Vyom.
32	"Vansh is held at gunpoint!"	20 April 2021
After Sia goes missing, Vansh confronts Vyom and interrogate him about her whereabouts at gunpoint. However, things take an ugly turn as Vyom wins the gun from him and threaten to kill him.
33	"Vyom captives Riddhima"	21 April 2021
Riddhima visits Vyom to request him for the antidote for Vansh and ends up captivated. Later, Vyom calls Vansh and demands the black box to release Riddhima.
34	"Vansh's race against the clock"	22 April 2021
Vansh reaches Vyom to save Riddhima and Angre from his captivity. But a poisoned Vansh fades in front of Vyom, as he begins to run out of time.
35	"Vansh has his last moments"	23 April 2021
On the verge of death, Vansh savours his last moments with Riddhima and his loved ones. Meanwhile, Vyom is holding the antidote for Vansh in return for the black box.
36	"Vansh spikes Riddhima's drink"	24 April 2021
After Vansh fails to get Riddhima to reveal the truth behind her disappearance, he comes up with a plan to spike Riddhima's drink to make her do his bidding.
37	"Danger looms over Vansh's family"	26 April 2021
Vyom calls Indrani to threaten her and vows to wreak havoc in Vansh's life. Later, Riddhima goes missing from the resort, and Vansh grows anxious.
38	"Riddhima investigates Vansh's family"	27 April 2021
Vyom is still onto Riddhima and believes that their deal isn't off yet. Meanwhile, Riddhima investigates Vansh's family members one by one to find out who else is working for Vyom.
39	"Riddhima is in danger"	28 April 2021
Riddhima arrives at the poolside after she finds a note from Vansh asking her to meet him there. While she waits for Vansh, she gets pushed into the pool.
40	"Vansh in dilemma!"	29 April 2021
By giving Riddhima the first dose of the high risk medicine, Vansh learns a part of the secret she has been hiding. Now, he finds himself in dilemma as the other dose can reveal the truth but it puts Riddhima's life at risk!
41	"Vansh gets a lead!"	30 April 2021
Vansh finds a perfect opportunity to acquire information from Riddhima and sedates her with the drug. Resultingly, an intoxicated Riddhima reveals the name Sara, who is a contract killer.
42	"Is Ishani a black mamba?"	1 May 2021
Upon finding out that Ishani pushed her into the pool, Riddhima wonders whether Ishani is a black mamba. Later on, Riddhima and Vansh spend a romantic evening.
43	"Riddhima feels threatened"	3 May 2021
Gayatri challenges Riddhima that she will get rid of Vansh no matter who comes in between them within the next twelve hours.
44	"Vansh finds the black box"	4 May 2021
Vansh starts to grow anxious as his search for the black box leads him nowhere. However, he grows suspicious when he finds the black box in his grandmother's room hidden in the locker.
45	"Sara to kill Vansh"	5 May 2021
In order to stop Sara from harming Vansh, Riddhima locks Sara in her hotel bathroom. However, Sara escapes without Riddhima's knowledge and goes on to implement her plan to kill Vansh and get her revenge.
46	"Vansh finds himself trapped!"	6 May 2021
Riddhima grows distressed when she fails to find Vansh's whereabouts. Meanwhile, Vansh, who begins to feel breathless, finds himself trapped inside the sauna and ends up losing consciousness.
47	"Sara's murder attempt fails!"	7 May 2021
Sara's attempt to murder Vansh doesn't go as planned as her aim misses him by an inch. However, frustrated, she declares in front of Riddhima to have another attempt before the time runs out.
48	"Sara's cunning deception!"	8 May 2021
After Sara's attempt to murder Vansh fails, she flees from the situation and shoots herself in the hand to create a deception. Moments later, Vansh arrives and grows suspicious, looking at the situation.
49	"Vansh steals the evidence!"	10 May 2021
Vansh contacts Angre with a transmitter card and calms down Ishani. However, he makes a master plan and steals the evidence and instructs Aryan to hide them safely.
50	"Vansh checkmates Vyom"	11 May 2021
Vansh and Ishani trap Vyom and Ajay by capturing a video of them dealing with drugs and checkmate them with the footage. However, Vansh gets a threatening message and learns that Riddhima has been kidnapped.
51	"Ishani conspires against Riddhima"	12 May 2021
When Riddhima is kidnapped, Isha looks at it as an opportunity to get rid of Riddhima for good. Meanwhile, Vansh finds clues that will help him find Riddhima.
52	"Vansh is in a perilous situation"	13 May 2021
A temporarily blinded Vansh goes searching for Riddhima, who has been held captive by Vyom. On his way to Riddhima, he gets into a life-threatening situation after stepping on a mine.
53	"Aryan to foil Vansh's plan?"	14 May 2021
Vansh prepares to drug Riddhima for the last time to get her to reveal the overall truth she has been hiding. Meanwhile, Aryan learns Vansh's plan and decides to use the opportunity in his favour.
54	"Riddhima to save Vansh's life?"	15 May 2021
Riddhima confronts Vyom and beseeches in front of him to spare Vansh's life. Moreover, she offers him Vansh's entire business empire in return for his life and refuge in a foreign haven.
55	"Vyom initiates his plan!"	17 May 2021
Vyom's attention shifts from Vansh to the assassin, who left the former with a lethal wound. And to find out who it is, Vyom forces Aryan to appoint him as the manager of the hotel.
56	"Riddhima confronts Angre!"	18 May 2021
A distraught Riddhima is unable to find Vansh and confronts Angre to reveal his location. While Angre refuses to divulge the information, she decides to search for Vansh herself.
57	"Riddhima gets Vyom arrested"	19 May 2021
Riddhima traps Vyom in the murder of Gayatri and gets him arrested. However, Riddhima and Gayatri plot the fake case of murder only to sideline Vyom for Vansh's safety.
58	"Riddhima learns an appalling truth"	20 May 2021
Riddhima finds Gayatri to be brutally injured and soon succumbs to death. When Riddhima looks around to find the murderer, she finds Angre shaking hands with Vyom and confirming the news of her death.
59	"Riddhima learns about Mallika"	21 May 2021
Riddhima is left surprised after learning about Mallika, whom she met earlier is believed to be dead. She feels something is fishy and decides to investigate the truth.
60	"Riddhima spiles on Angre"	22 May 2021
After Vyom hoodwinks Riddhima and takes the valuable diamond in his possession, she gets suspicious of Angre's involvement with Vyom and spies on him to find the diamond.
61	"Riddhima learns the truth about sara"	24 May 2021
When Riddhima confronts Angre about working for Vyom, he reveals his plan to her and shows her that Gayatri is alive, leaving her shocked. Meanwhile, Vyom desperately looks for the diamond.
62	"Riddhima's master plan!"	25 May 2021
Riddhima and Angre locate the diamond and make a devious plan to steal it. However, when Riddhima breaks in to commit burglary, she is confronted by Vyom, who already has the diamond in his possession.
63	"Riddhima gets the upper hand"	26 May 2021
Riddhima gets her hands on the diamond and holds it as leverage against Vyom in a bid to get him to reveal the location where Vansh has been kept.
64	"Riddhima spies on Vyom"	27 May 2021
While spying on Vyom, Riddhima realises that he has been holding a person in his captivity and decides to investigate.
65	"Riddhima gets a message"	28 May 2021
As Riddhima tries to find clues about Vansh, a person bumps into her and drops a pen drive with her name on it. Further, Riddhima finds a cryptic video with the name mentioned as Black Mamba.
66	"Vyom breaks down!"	29 May 2021
On seeing Vyom's emotional breakdown, Riddhima secretly sweeps through his belongings in an attempt to find a clue to solve the puzzle.
67	"Riddhima gets emotional"	31 May 2021
Riddhima is overwhelmed with emotions on seeing Vansh and is unwilling to let go of his hand even while going to sleep. The next day, she wakes up and fails to find Vansh by her side.
68	"Vyom's tragic story"	1 June 2021
When Riddhima questions an intoxicated Vyom about the whereabouts of the unknown woman and her child, Vyom reveals that they were his wife and daughter, whom Vansh had murdered.
69	"Riddhima learns Vansh's plan"	2 June 2021
Riddhima gets miffed at Vansh and Angre after learning about their plan from Angre. Later, when she meets Vyom to learn the truth regarding his claims about Vansh's villainy, he attempts to shoot her.
70	"Vansh shoots Vyom"	3 June 2021
When Vyom points the gun at Riddhima, Vansh comes to her rescue and by shooting Vyom instead. However, Vyom blames Vansh for his dreadful life and accuses Vansh of backstabbing him.
71	"Vansh warns Riddhima"	4 June 2021
When Riddhima and Vansh get into an argument, he warns her to stay out of his business and stop hiding things from him.
72	"Vansh is angry with Riddhima"	5 June 2021
Vansh walks out of the hotel room in anger and questions Riddhima for her action. He grows furious when she fails to justify herself and refuses to reveal the truth to him regarding her sneaky behaviour.
73	"Riddhima gets a reminder"	7 June 2021
Gayatri reminds Riddhima that she has very little time to fulfil her demand or else she will assassinate Vansh. Later, Riddhima goes to Angre for help, but he refuses to agree to Riddhima's terms without Vansh's permission.
74	"Riddhima gets a nightmare"	8 June 2021
Riddhima gets a nightmare in which Gayatri kills Vansh right in front of her eyes. Riddhima goes to Vansh's room to ensure everything is fine, but she finds Gayatri taking a shower in Vyom's room.
75	"Vyom questions Gayatri"	9 June 2021
Vyom enquires about Gayatri from his sources and learns that she is a professional killer named Sarah. He confronts her and enquires the identity of the person who paid her to shoot Vansh.
76	"Vansh confronts Ishani"	13 June 2021
Riddhima requests Thapa to not share a word with Vansh about their action. While Vansh learns from Thapa that Ishani is trying to make fake documents, he grows angry and confronts her to know about her intentions.
77	"Riddhima-Vansh get a surprise"	11 June 2021
Worried about Vansh's actions, Riddhima recalls their moments and sheds tears. Meanwhile, Riddhima and Vansh get surprise cards and cakes for their wedding anniversary. How will they react to his surprise? Did they surprise each other?
78	"Vansh grows furious"	12 June 2021
Angre holds Riddhima's hand to stop her from leaving when he asks her about the forged documents. When Vansh sees Angre holding Riddhima's hands, he gets infuriated at Angre and beats him into pulp. Is this a sign of Vansh's love for Riddhima?
79	"Vansh questions Riddhima"	13 June 2021
On learning that Riddhima had contacted Thappa to create a fake ID, he questions her motive behind it. Will Vansh receive answers from Riddhima?
80	"Vansh searches for Riddhima"	14 June 2021
While Riddhima struggles to get out of the car filled with gas, Vansh arrives at the parking lot as he finds a clue regarding Riddhima's whereabouts. Will Vansh find Riddhima in time to rescue her?
81	"Vansh is Outraged!"	15 June 2021
Vansh is left shocked when Ishani reveals that she attempted to kill Riddhima. Fuming with rage, Vansh slaps Ishani and demands her to apologise to Riddhima! Will Ishani comply with Vansh's demand and apologise to Riddhima? Find out, on Voot!
82	"Riddhima is accused of murder"	16 June 2021
A nervous Riddhima goes to confront Sara after coming across a note that accuses her of having committed a murder. However, Sara refuses to acknowledge Riddhima's questions. Will Riddhima find the person who sent her the note?
83	"Vyom learns Riddhima's secret"	17 June 2021
Vyom confronts Riddhima after learning her secret and gleefully assures her that Vansh will never forgive her for her actions. Will this secret drive a wedge between Vansh and Riddhima?
84	"Riddhima gets probed"	18 June 2021
Chanchal finds medicines prescribed after abortion to Ishani while secretly searching Riddhima's room. Both of them reveal this to Anupriya who then confronts Riddhima for lying about her pregnancy. What will Riddhima do now?
85	"Riddhima is in a pickle"	19 June 2021
A dazed Riddhima wakes up in the hospital to find herself surrounded by Vansh's family, that claims to have arrived after receiving her message. Have they learnt the truth about Riddhima's pregnancy?
86	"Riddhima confronts Sia"	19 June 2021
Riddhima learns that Sia was following her. In an attempt to destroy her peace, Riddhima confronts her and threatens to inform Vansh. Will Riddhima hold her ground?
87	"Riddhima's secret is exposed"	20 June 2021
Riddhima's attempt to learn Black Mamba's identity gets foiled when the family exposes her fake pregnancy before Vansh. How will Vansh react to learning this shocking news?
88	"Riddhima apologises to Gayatri"	21 June 2021
After learning the truth about Gayatri's past, Riddhima confronts her and apologises for her brutal actions. Later, Riddhima tries to convince Vansh that Gayatri is innocent. Will Vansh pay heed to Riddhima?
89	"Riddhima looks for Gayatri"	22 June 2021
Riddhima receives some information from Chanchal. However, she begins feeling like something is not adding up and proceeds to look for Gayatri to talk to her but is unable to find her anywhere. Can Riddhima find Gayatri before something bad happens?
90	"Riddhima loses her patience"	23 June 2021
Riddhima wakes up to find Vansh busy with his work and tries to get his attention. However, Vansh responds to Riddhima incoherently, leaving her mad. Will Riddhima find a way to get Vansh's undivided attention?
91	"Riddhima takes up a disguise"	24 June 2021
Riddhima learns that one of Vansh's business partners is coming to meet him. Furthermore, she decides to take up the partner's appearance in order to spend more time with Vansh. Will Riddhima's plan succeed in letting her be close to Vansh?
92	"Mr Roy fools Chanchal"	25 June 2021
Mr Roy aka Riddhima tricks Chanchal into secret magic to convert silver coins into gold ones. Later, Aryan and Ishani see Chanchal eating chillies while moving around a tree rather than keeping her eyes on Mr Roy. Will they suspect her?
93	"An unpleasant surprise for Riddhima"	26 June 2021
Riddhima tries her best to keep the guise of Mr Roy a secret. But to her surprise, she learns that Angre and Vansh are already aware of it. So, was Vansh just playing along with Riddhima and Mr Roy?
94	"The true identity of Mr Roy!"	27 June 2021
Riddhima reveals to Vansh that she is none other than the mysterious Mr Roy. When Ishani and the others speak ill of Mr Roy, Vansh and Riddhima start laughing at them. Will they reveal the truth to them?
95	"Riddhima finds a secret room"	28 June 2021
Vyom shows Riddhima a room and tells her that Vansh is hiding somebody inside it, but Riddhima fails to pay heed. However, when Ishani stops her from entering the room, Riddhima's suspicions grow stronger. Will Riddhima dig deeper?
96	"Vyom threatens Indrani"	29 June 2021
Vyom meets Indrani and threatens to get rid of her for good and discloses her secrets to Vansh, but she warns him of the consequences. Will Vyom hold back and give in to the threat?
97	"Will Vansh reveal his secret?"	30 June 2021
Vansh gets enraged after Riddhima wishes him on his birthday, and she asks him the reason behind his annoyance. Vansh tells Riddhima that he has to show her something and takes her to the room. Is the room connected to Vansh's past?
