= Rrahul Sudhir =

Indian television actor

- Occupation: Actor
- Years active: 2015–present
- Known for: Ishq Mein Marjawan 2 IMM 2: Naya Safar; Dabangii

Rrahul Sudhir is an Indian television actor. He is best known for portraying Vansh Raisinghania in Ishq Mein Marjawan 2. He is currently portraying the role of Eklavya in Dabangii – Mulgii Aayi Re Aayi.

== Personal life ==
Rrahul hails from Kashmir.

== Career ==
Rrahul Sudhir began his acting career in 2015. In 2016, he played a minor role in Amit Khanna's webshow All about Section 377. Subsequently, he acted in various web shows such as Gehraiyaan, Maaya and Spotlight before landing a major role in the 2017 web series Twisted as inspector Aryan Mathur. He went on to play the lead in the second season as the same character.

He debuted on television in 2019 with Zee TV's Rajaa Betaa as Dr. Vedant Tripathi but had to quit the show after months owing to his mother's health.

He portrayed Vansh Raisinghania in Ishq Mein Marjawan 2 opposite Helly Shah that aired from 13 July 2020 to 13 March 2021 on Colors TV. After the show went off air, the new season titled Ishq Mein Marjawan 2: Naya Safar began to stream on Voot Select since 15 March, with Rrahul reprising the character of Vansh.

He has done his first short film named Ishqiyaat which was released on 14 February 2022 . Since May 2023, he portrayed Sikander Oberoi in Colors TV's Tere Ishq Mein Ghayal.

== Filmography ==
=== Television ===
Year	Title	Role	Notes
2015	Gulmohar Grand	Unnamed	Guest
2019	Rajaa Betaa	Dr. Vedant Tripathi	
2020–2021	Ishq Mein Marjawan 2	Vansh Raisinghania/Vihaan	
2020	Pinjara Khubsurti Ka	Vansh Raisinghania	Special appearance
2023	Tere Ishq Mein Ghayal	Sikandar Oberoi	
2024	Dabangii – Mulgii Aayi Re Aayi	Eklavya / Yug Sisodiya	

=== Web series ===
Year	Title	Role	Notes
2016	All About Section 377	Mark	
2017	Gehraiyaan	Mr. Mukherjee	
2017	Maaya:Slave of her desires	Lawyer	
2017	Spotlight	Advocate Ajit	
2017	Twisted	Inspector Aryan Mathur	
2018	Still About Section 377	Mark	
2018	Twisted 2	Aryan Mathur	
2021	Ishq Mein Marjawan 2: Naya Safar	Vansh Raisinghania	
2023	Bekaaboo 3	Arjun Irani	
2023	Honeymoon Suite Room No. 911 Season 1	Raj	
2024	Angithee	Kunal	
2025	Rishton Ka Chakarvyuh	Vikram	

=== Short film ===
Year	Title	Role	Notes
2022	Ishqyaat	Kabir	

== Awards and nominations ==
Year	Award	Category	Nominee/Work	Results
2021	Indian Television Academy Awards	ITA Award for Best Actor Popular	Ishq Mein Marjawan 2	Nominated
2021	International Iconic Awards	Best Actor of Indian Television 2021	Ishq Mein Marjawan 2	Won
2021	International Iconic Awards	Best Jodi of Indian Television 2021 (with Helly Shah)	Ishq Mein Marjawan 2	Nominated
2021	Iconic Gold Awards	Iconic Romantic Actor Of the Year	Ishq Mein Marjawan 2	Won
2021	Iconic Gold Awards	Iconic Jodi Of The Year (with Helly Shah)	Ishq Mein Marjawan 2	Won
2021	The Mumbai Achievers Award	Best Romantic Jodi Of The Year (with Helly Shah)	Ishq Mein Marjawan 2	Won
2021	Universal India Awards	The Most promising actor of the year	Ishq Mein Marjawan 2	Won
2021	GiaiThoungNgoiSaoXanh Face of the Year 2021	Favorite Foreign Actor of the Year	Ishq Mein Marjawan 2	Won
