= Sumana Das =

Indian television actress

Sumana Das Goradia
- Born: Sumana Das
- Occupation: Actress
- Years active: 2009–2016
- Spouse: Sumit Goradia (m. 2014)
- Mother: Sabitri Das Mahanta
- Family: Madhumita Das (sister)

Sumana Das Goradia is an Indian television actress. She appeared in the role of Shamoli on Bayttaab Dil Kee Tamanna Hai and has also appeared as Riya in Kya Mast Hai Life on the Disney Channel. Sumana Das was born in Diphu, Assam. Her elder sister Madhumita Das too is a television actor.

== Television ==
| Year | Show | Role | Channel | Notes |
|---|---|---|---|---|
| 2009–2010 | Kya Mast Hai Life | Riya | Disney | Supporting role |
| 2009–2010 | Bayttaab Dil Kee Tamanna Hai | Shamoli Kunal Mehra | Sony TV | Lead role |
| 2010 | Aahat - Isse Dekhna Mana Hai : Part 1 & Part 2 | Naina (Episode 37 & Episode 38) | Sony TV | Episodic role |
| 2010 | Bairi Piya | Kajri | Colors TV | Supporting role |
| 2010 | C.I.D. - Netraheen Gawah | Episode 653 | Sony TV | Episodic role |
| 2011 | Nachle Ve with Saroj Khan | Guest | NDTV Imagine | Reality show |
| 2011–2012 | Kahani Chandrakanta Ki | Damini | Sahara One | Supporting role |
| 2012 | Fear Files: Darr Ki Sacchi Tasvirein | Episode 11 | Zee TV | Episodic role |
| 2012 | Savdhaan India | Pratima (Episode 22) | Life OK | Episodic role |
| 2013 | Savitri - Ek Prem Kahani | Mishti | Life OK | Supporting role |
| 2013 | Fear Files: Darr Ki Sacchi Tasvirein | Episode 92 | Zee TV | Episodic role |
| 2014 | Yeh Hai Aashiqui | Rohan's Elder Sister (Season 1 - Episode 13) | Bindass | Episodic role |
