= Savitri Devi College & Hospital =

Indian television show

- Genre: Medical; Romance; Paranormal; Drama
- Created by: Rashmi Sharma
- Written by: Rashmi Sharma; Virendra Shahaney; Rajesh Dubey; Priyaom Jha; Shruti Tiwari; Vinay Chhawal; Sancheeta Bose; Sharad Chandra Tripathi; Akash Deep
- Directed by: Arvind Gupta
- Creative directors: Sanyukta Sharma; Divya Soni
- Starring: See below
- Music by: Asif Panjwani
- Country of origin: India
- Original language: Hindi
- No. of episodes: 367

Production
- Executive producers: Amar Gaasavani; Raaj Singh Deora
- Producers: Rashmi Sharma; Pawan Kumar Marut
- Camera setup: Multi-camera
- Running time: 22 minutes
- Production company: Rashmi Sharma Telefilms Limited

Original release
- Network: Colors TV
- Release: 15 May 2017 – 29 September 2018

Savitri Devi College & Hospital is an Indian drama television series, that was aired for 365 episodes from 15 May 2017 to 29 September 2018 on Colors TV. Produced by Rashmi Sharma, it starred Swarda Thigale, Varun Kapoor and Vikram Sakhalkar. In 2019, it was re-aired on Rishtey as Mere Dil Ki Lifeline.

== Plot ==
The show revolves around the life of Dr. Saachi Mishra, a young medical student who aspires to become a successful doctor and joins the prestigious Savitri Devi College & Hospital in pursuit of her dream. Saachi comes from a middle-class family having been brought up by her mother Jaya, who has a secret past with the owner of Savitri Devi Hospital, the famous Dr. Anand Malhotra. Jaya's deceased husband Dr. Sunil Mishra and Anand were business partners. Savitri Devi College and Hospital is built on Sunil's land. The show also features the lives of Dr. Anand Malhotra and his family including his son Dr. Veer and daughter Priya and his second wife Gayatri and her daughter Dr. Riya and Anand's younger brother Adarsh and his wife Neeta. Savitri Devi College & Hospital is named after Anand's deceased wife Savitri who was Jaya's best friend. Later Saachi gets admission as an intern in Savitri Devi College & Hospital with her best friends Dr. Isha Negi and Dr. Pragya Yadav.

Dr. Veer and Dr. Riya are also interns in same hospital. Saachi learns of Mishra family's past with Savitri Devi College and Hospital. Savitri is revealed to be alive and is in same hospital. Anand had hidden Savitri in a room. Saachi finds out that Savitri is alive and guides Veer to that room. Savitri was comatose for fifteen years. Savitri met with an accident 15 years before. Soon Savitri wakes up from coma and returns to Malhotra family. She knows Anand's secret. Veer and Saachi fall in love with each other and get married.

A witch Nayantara haunts the Malhotra family so she can exert revenge on Anand. Years ago a pregnant woman (Nayantara) came to Savitri Devi Hospital for delivery. But she didn't get the care and treatment she needed, so her baby came out stillborn. Nayantara died from the shock and Anand buried Nayantara's body in the same ward. Saachi manages to free Riya whom Nayantara had possessed and saves the family. The serial ends with the Malhotra's turning ward 13 (which was the ward Nayantara died) into "Nayantara pediatric ward" in remembrance of Nayantara and her child.

== Cast ==
=== Main ===
- Swarda Thigale as Dr. Saachi Malhotra (nee Mishra): Sunil and Jaya's daughter; Sunny's elder sister; Pragya and Isha's friend; Veer's wife (2017–18)
- Varun Kapoor as Dr. Veer Malhotra: Anand and Savitri's younger son; Priya's brother; Gayatri's step son; Riya's half-brother; Aniket and Garv's friend; Mishri's ex-fiance; Saachi's husband (2017–18)
  - Prerit Parpani as child Veer Malhotra (2017–18)
- Vikram Sakhalkar as Dr. Kabir Kapoor: Kusum's son; Riya's husband (2017–18)

=== Recurring ===
- Arshi Khan as Nayantara: Witch (2018)
- Shilpa Shirodkar as Jaya Mishra: Sunil's widow; Savitri's friend; Saachi and Sunny's mother (2017–18)
- Neha Bagga as Dr. Pragya Yadav: Saachi and Isha's friend; Satish's fiancé (2017–18)
- Sharan Kaur as Dr. Isha Negi: Saachi and Pragya's friend; Manav's love interest (2017–18)
- Shabaaz Abdullah Badi as Manav Rai: Isha's patient and lover (2017–18)
- Mohan Kapur as Dr. Anand Malhotra: Owner of Savitri Devi College & Hospital; Sumitra's son; Adarsh's elder brother; Sunil's business partner; Savitri and Gayatri's husband; Priya, Veer and Riya's father (2017–18)
- Shruti Kanwar as Priya Malhotra Chawla: Savitri and Anand's elder daughter; Veer's sister; Gayatri's step daughter; Riya's half-sister; Sanket's ex-lover; Vikrant's wife (2017–18)
- Yuvraj Malhotra as Vikrant Chawla: Sujeet's son; Priya's husband (2017–18)
- Nishigandha Wad as Savitri Devi: Jaya's friend; Anand's first wife; Priya and Veer's mother; Riya's step mother (2017–18)
- Sonica Handa as Gayatri Raisinghania Malhotra: Vaidehi's daughter; Anand's second wife; Priya and Veer's step mother; Riya's mother (2017–18)
- Akansha Sareen as Dr. Riya Malhotra Kapoor: Gayatri and Anand's daughter; Priya and Veer's half-sister; Madhu and Bala's friend; Kabir's wife (2017–18)
- Meghna Datta as Dr. Madhu Goenka: Riya's friend (2017–18)
- Aliya Naaz as Dr. Bala
- Mugdha Chaphekar as Mishri: Veer's ex-wife (2018)
- Aashish Kaul as Sujeet Chawla: Vikrant's father (2017)
- Unknown as Sunil Mishra: Ashok and Suman's elder brother; Anand's business partner; Jaya's husband; Saachi and Sunny's father (2017)
- Aneesh Sharma as Dr. Aneesh Rastogi: Garv and Veer's friend (2017–18)
- Garv Bajaj as Dr. Garv Singh: Aneesh and Veer's friend (2017–18)
- Aakash Talwar as Satish: Pragya's fiancé (2018)
- Alan Kapoor as Sanket Sharma: Priya's ex-boyfriend (2017–18)
- Shivaani Sopuri as Sumitra Malhotra: Anand and Adarsh's mother; Priya, Veer and Riya's grandmother (2017–18)
- Aparna Ghoshal as Kusum Kapoor: Kabir's mother (2017–18)
- Priya Malik as Keerti Fernandes
- Amit Dhawan as Adarsh Malhotra: Sumitra's son; Anand's younger brother; Neeta's husband; Priya, Veer and Riya's uncle (2017–18)
- Kishwer Merchant/Kajal Pisal as Neeta Sachdev: Adarsh's wife; Priya, Veer and Riya's aunt (2017–18)
- Suchit Vikram Singh as Pratik (2017)
- Prerna Panwar as Dr. Ayesha Khurana: Gayatri's accomplice (2018)
- Vandana Pathak as Vaidehi Singhania/Padmini: Gayatri's mother; Riya's maternal grandmother (2017–18)
- Sushil Bounthiyal as Ashok Mishra: Sunil and Suman's brother; Khushboo's husband (2017–18)
- Sudipti Parmar as Khushboo Parmar: Aakash's daughter; Ashok's wife (2017–18)
- Unknown as Suman Mishra: Sunil and Ashok's younger sister (2017–18)
- Unknown as Aakash Parmar: Khushboo's father (2017–18)
- Ahmad Harhash as Sagar Kapoor (2018)
- Girish Thapar as Advocate Sadashiv Saxena

=== Special appearances ===
- Helly Shah as Devanshi from Devanshi
- Rubina Dilaik as Soumya Singh from Shakti - Astitva Ke Ehsaas Ki
