= Swaragini – Jodein Rishton Ke Sur =

Indian television series

- Also known as: Swaragini
- Genre: Drama; Romance
- Screenplay by: Gautam Hegde; Janki Vishwanathan; Sharad C. Tripathi
- Story by: Mahesh Pandey; Akash Deep; Rashmi Sharma; Mrinal Jha
- Directed by: Taraknath Mourya
- Starring: See below
- Opening theme: Swaragini....
- Country of origin: India
- Original language: Hindi
- No. of seasons: 1
- No. of episodes: 472

Production
- Producer: Rashmi Sharma
- Production locations: Kolkata; Mumbai; Patna
- Editor: Hemant Kumar
- Camera setup: Multi camera
- Running time: 22 min approx
- Production company: Rashmi Sharma Telefilms

Original release
- Network: Colors TV
- Release: 2 March 2015 – 17 December 2016

Swaragini — Jodein Rishton Ke Sur (Swaragini — Join the Melody of Relationships) is an Indian Hindi-language television drama series that aired from 2 March 2015 to 17 December 2016 on Colors TV and streams digitally on Jio Cinema. Produced under the banner of Rashmi Sharma Telefilms, the series starred Helly Shah, Tejasswi Prakash, Varun Kapoor and Namish Taneja.

== Plot ==
Swara is a modern Bengali girl who lives with her single mother Sharmishtha and her grandmother Shobha. Ragini has been raised as a traditional Marwari girl by her single father, Shekhar, and her paternal grandmother, Parvati. Swara and Ragini become friends, but learn they are half-sisters as Swara is Shekhar and Sharmishtha's daughter, who were separated because of cultural differences. Later, Swara and Ragini unite and get Sharmishtha and Shekhar married.

Ragini's fiancé Lakshya falls for Swara, who loves him too. Later, Ragini plans to separate them, but is exposed and soon repents. Eventually, Laksh and Ragini marry after she and Swara expose Laksh's ex-lover Kavya. Swara fakes a marriage with Sanskaar, who hates his family after his fiancée Kavita's death. Later, Sanskaar forgives his family. Through the course of time, Swara and Sanskaar, Laksh and Ragini fall in love. Kavita returns and wants Sanskaar back, but later reunites him with Swara. They confess their love and are married again.

Rajat, eyeing the Maheshwari's wealth, traps Sanskaar's sister, and soon kidnaps Swara, who falls off the cliff while Sanskaar shoots him. She loses her memory but is saved by a rockstar, Sahil, who helps her recuperate. He then becomes obsessed with Swara and tries to kidnap her and kill Sanskar but he is arrested with the help of his mother.

Sharmishtha gets pregnant with Shekhar's child but suffers a miscarriage due to Parvati, who does not want a middle-aged woman having a child. It is then revealed that Sharmishtha gave birth to a boy but Parvati ordered the nurse to abandon the boy on the streets with a beggar. Later, Laksh's brother Adarsh and his wife Parineeta seize the family property and the family is forced to shift to Swara and Ragini's house. Swara and Ragini make them realise their mistake and the family is reunited, but finds that Laksh is missing and is assumed dead. Swara blames Sanskaar and they part ways, with her and Ragini returning to their parents.

=== Six months later ===
Laksh is alive and lives as Abhimanyu Khanna, with Abhimanyu's wife Mansi and daughter Mishka. Swara, Ragini, Sanskaar and Laksh unite as they expose Nikhil and Mansi. Lakshya and Ragini later adopt Mishka. The story ends with the family reunion and Swara and Ragini's music performance.

== Cast ==
=== Main ===
- Helly Shah as Swara Gadodia Maheshwari: Shekhar and Sharmishtha's daughter; Ayush's sister; Sanskaar's wife. (2015–2016)
- Tejasswi Prakash as Ragini Gadodia Maheshwari: Shekhar and Janki's daughter; Lakshya's wife; Mishka's adoptive mother. (2015–2016)
- Varun Kapoor as Sanskaar Maheshwari: Ramprasad and Sujata's son; Uttara's brother; Swara's husband. (2015–2016)
- Namish Taneja as Lakshya Maheshwari: Durgaprasad and Annapurna's son; Adarsh's brother; Ragini's husband; Mishka's adoptive father. (2015–2016)

=== Recurring ===
==== Gadodias ====
- Abhijit Lahiri as Deendayal Gadodia: Parvati's husband; Shekhar's father; Ragini, Swara and Ayush's grandfather; Mishka's adoptive great-grandfather. (2015–2016)
- Alka Kaushal as Parvati Gadodia: Deendayal's wife; Shekhar's mother; Ragini, Swara and Ayush's grandmother; Mishka's adoptive great-grandmother. (2015–2016)
- Sachin Tyagi as Shekhar Gadodia: Deendayal and Parvati's son; Janki and Sharmishtha's husband; Ragini, Swara and Ayush's father; Mishka's adoptive grandfather. (2015–2016)
- Dalljiet Kaur as Janki Kataria Gadodia: Shekhar's first wife; Ragini's mother; Mishka's adoptive grandmother. (2015–2016)
- Parineeta Borthakur as Sharmishtha Bose Gadodia: Shekhar's second wife; Swara and Ayush's mother. (2015–2016)
- Ahmad Harhash as Ayush Gadodia: Shekhar and Sharmishtha's son; Swara's brother. (2015–2016)

==== Maheshwaris ====
- Nagesh Salwan as Durgaprasad "Durga" Maheshwari: Annapurna's husband; Lakshya and Adarsh's father; Mishka's adoptive grandfather. (2015–2016)
- Shalini Kapoor as Annapurna Maheshwari: Durgaprasad's wife; Lakshya and Adarsh's mother; Mishka's adoptive grandmother. (2015–2016)
- Tasheen Shah as Mishka Maheshwari: Lakshya and Ragini's adopted daughter. (2016)
- Tarun Singh as Adarsh Maheshwari: Durgaprasad and Annapurna's son; Lakshya's brother; Parineeta's husband. (2015–2016)
- Akanksha Chamola as Parineeta "Pari" Patil Maheshwari: Adarsh's wife. (2015–2016)
- Amar Sharma as Ramprasad "Ram" Maheshwari: Sujata's husband; Sankaar and Uttara's father. (2015–2016)
- Sonica Handa as Sujata Maheshwari: Ramprasad's wife; Sanskaar and Uttara's mother. (2015–2016)
- Ekta Methai as Uttara Maheshwari: Ramprasad and Sujata's daughter; Sanskaar's sister. (2015)
  - Khyati Mangla replaced Methai as Uttara Maheshwari. (2015–2016)

==== Other Recurring Cast ====
- Tanima Sen as Shobha Bose: Sharmishta's mother; Swara and Ayush's grandmother; Ragini's step-grandmother (2015)
- Nikita Sharma as Kavita Roy: Kaveri's daughter; Sanskaar's ex-fiancée (2015–2016)
- Anuj Sachdeva as Sahil Sengupta: Maya's son; Swara's obsessive lover (2016)
- Mughdha Shah as Sulekha Patil: Parineeta's mother (2016)
- Mohit Abrol as Rajat Lodha: Uttara's ex-fiancé (2016)
- Roop Durgapal as Tanya "Kavya" Malhotra: Kartik's sister; Lakshya's ex-wife (2016)
- Mayur Verma as Karthik Malhotra: Kavya's brother (2016)
- Sonia Singh as Urvashi Kataria: Janki's sister; Ragini's aunt (2016)
- Sonia Shah as Kaveri Roy: Kavita's mother (2016)
- Nupur Alankar as Gayatri Bhandari: Chirag's mother (2016)
- Manoj Chandila as Chirag Bhandari: Gayatri's son; Uttara's ex-fiancé (2016)
- Pratap Hada as Nikhil Chatterjee: Mansi's boyfriend; Mishka's father (2016)
- Unknown as Mansi Khanna: Abhimanyu's widow; Nikhil's girlfriend; Mishka's mother (2016)
- Unknown as Abhimanyu Khanna: Mansi's husband; Mishka's step-father (2016)

=== Guest appearances ===
- Deepika Padukone as Herself to promote Bajirao Mastani
- Ranveer Singh as Himself to promote Bajirao Mastani
- Salman Khan as Himself to promote Prem Ratan Dhan Payo
- Sonam Kapoor as Herself to promote Prem Ratan Dhan Payo
- Nishant Singh Malkani as Himself in a dance performance
- Sanjeeda Sheikh as Herself in a dance performance
- Sana Amin Sheikh as Aradhya Rao from Krishnadasi
- Dipika Kakar as Simar Bhardwaj from Sasural Simar Ka
- Dheeraj Dhoopar as Prem Bharadwaj from Sasural Simar Ka
- Karan Johar as Himself to promote India's Got Talent
- Malaika Arora Khan as Herself to promote India's Got Talent
- Kirron Kher as Herself to promote India's Got Talent

== Awards and nominations ==
Year	Award	Category	Recipient	Result	Ref.
2015	Gold Awards	Best Actress in a Negative Role	Tejasswi Prakash	Nominated	
2015	Indian Telly Awards	Best Actress in a Negative Role	Tejasswi Prakash	Nominated	
2016	Asian Viewers Television Awards	Male Actor Of The Year	Varun Kapoor	Nominated	
2016	Asian Viewers Television Awards	Female Actor Of The Year	Helly Shah	Nominated	
2016	Golden Petal Awards	Best Serial	Swaragini – Jodein Rishton Ke Sur	Nominated	
2016	Golden Petal Awards	Best Actor	Varun Kapoor	Won	
2016	Golden Petal Awards	Best Actress	Helly Shah	Won	
2016	Golden Petal Awards	Best Actress	Tejasswi Prakash	Nominated	
2016	Golden Petal Awards	Best Actor - Debut	Namish Taneja	Nominated	
2016	Golden Petal Awards	Best Actress In A Comic Role	Sonica Handa	Nominated	
2016	Golden Petal Awards	Best Actress In Supporting Role	Parineeta Borthakur	Nominated	
2016	Golden Petal Awards	Favourite Jodi	Varun Kapoor & Helly Shah	Won	
