= Ishq Mein Marjawan 2 =

Indian thriller drama television series

- Also known as: Ek Baar Phir... Ishq Mein Marjawan
- Genre: Romance; Thriller
- Created by: Yash A Patnaik
- Developed by: Yash A Patnaik
- Screenplay by: Sameer Siddiqui
- Story by: Mamta Patnaik
- Directed by: Noel Smith
- Creative directors: Rakesh Ravikant Tak; Nisha Boridkar; Manjari Mukul
- Starring: Helly Shah; Rrahul Sudhir; Vishal Vashishtha
- Theme music composer: Toshi Sharib
- Opening theme: Ishq Mein Marjawan
- Composers: Dony Hazarika; Udbhav Ojha
- Country of origin: India
- Original language: Hindi
- No. of seasons: 1
- No. of episodes: 216

Production
- Producers: Yash A Patnaik; Mamta Patnaik
- Cinematography: Shanoo Singh Rajput
- Editor: Kshitija Khandagle
- Camera setup: Multi-camera
- Running time: 25 minutes
- Production companies: Beyond Dreams Entertainment; Inspire Films Private Limited

Original release
- Network: Colors TV
- Release: 13 July 2020 – 13 March 2021

Related
- Ishq Mein Marjawan; Fanaa: Ishq Mein Marjawan

Ishq Mein Marjawan 2 (transl. I will die in this love 2) is an Indian romantic thriller television series and spiritual sequel to Ishq Mein Marjawan produced by Yash A Patnaik. It starred Helly Shah, Rrahul Sudhir and Vishal Vashishtha.

The 216-episode series premiered on Colors TV on 13 July 2020 and went off air on 13 March 2021. It shifted to digital streaming on Voot Select with a new Season named Ishq Mein Marjawan 2: Naya Safar from 15 March 2021. The show ended on 5 July 2021.

It is the second installment of the Ishq Mein Marjawan series.

== Plot ==
The story revolves around Riddhima, an orphaned physiotherapist who is madly in love with her fiancé Kabir Sharma, a cop who sends her on a mission as an undercover agent to nab Vansh Rai Singhania, a business tycoon running illegal businesses throughout Southeast Asia.

Riddhima enters Vansh's cruise party as a party planner. Events unfolding during the cruise lead to Vansh hiring her as his sister Sia's physiotherapist. Eventually, Vansh begins to doubt her and coerces her to marry him to find out her real intention. She agrees, upon being pressed by Kabir.

On the day following the marriage, Riddhima finds a statue of Vansh's ex-fiancée Ragini. Believing him to be Ragini's killer, she plans to discover the truth about Ragini's death as it could provide major evidence against Vansh.

Next, she comes across a secret room in the mansion, where Riddhima sees a painting and another woman's statue. The woman in the painting is in fact Vansh's biological mother, Uma Rai Singhania, who left him without saying a word when he was young. Slowly, after listening to his story, Riddhima develops a soft corner for Vansh.

Meanwhile, it is revealed that Kabir had never loved Riddhima. However, at present he was using her for his mission and is actually revealed to be Anupriya's biological son. Kabir wants revenge from Vansh for his father's death and Anupriya wants to usurp Vansh's position and his businesses. In the mansion, Vansh begins to fall for Riddhima after she takes a bullet for him. Contrary to Kabir's expectations, Riddhima too slowly begins to reciprocate her feelings for Vansh. With the fear of his mission's failure, Kabir plans to remind Riddhima of her past and mission but it doesn't affect her. A series of events reveals the truth about Anupriya's son to the Rai Singhania's. However, Anupriya manages to keep her son's identity a secret.

Meanwhile, Kabir asks Riddhima to find evidence about Ragini's murder. Nevertheless, Riddhima defends Vansh, saying that he cannot commit such a crime. The same day, Riddhima gets a memory card containing a video beneath Ragini's statue and secretly watches it. The video shows Vansh pointing a gun at Ragini however not shooting. Riddhima accidentally comes across Ragini only to find her alive and kept secretly under Vansh. Some misunderstandings make Riddhima believe that Vansh wants to harm Ragini, thus she joins Kabir to remove Ragini from the clutches of Vansh. Losing Ragini, Vansh breakdowns and reveals to Riddhima that his mother was actually murdered and Ragini knew the killer. A flashback showing Anupriya was the killer. A series of events lead Sia into knowing Riddhima's truth and thus blackmailing her to bring Ragini back to Vansh. Sia soon learns of Anupriya's crime but is injured and goes into coma because of the same. Ragini is shot by Kabir, and Vansh is falsely framed and arrested for the murder. Kabir and Anupriya make Vansh into believing that Riddhima betrayed him and he jumps off a cliff thus dying in front of both Riddhima and Kabir.

A lookalike of Vansh, 'Vihaan' is introduced. Meanwhile, Kabir enters VR mansion as Anupriya's son. Kabir reveals to Riddhima his entire plan leaving her helpless. Vihaan is a hacker and a gold-digger. He intentionally plans to meet Riddhima. Riddhima is initially surprised seeing Vihaan, but later joins hands with him to get rid of Kabir from VR mansion, in exchange for a large sum of money. But afterwards, Vihaan reveals to Riddhima that Vansh used him as a body double in dangerous situations. Later on, it is revealed that Vihaan is actually Vansh who is playing mind games with Riddhima to know the truth.

Later on, someone puts a bomb in Riddhima's sandal on Christmas Eve which Vansh takes out in the right time thus saving her. Vansh discloses that it was Anupriya who killed his mother gets her arrested. While leaving the mansion Anupriya attempts to shoot Vansh but Riddhima takes the bullet once again thus saving him. Vansh confesses to Riddhima that he is not Vihaan but Vansh. She is taken to the hospital and saved. Vansh and Riddhima confess their love for each other and consummate. They then return to the VR Mansion. Ahana enters the mansion to bring new twists and turns in their lives. Kabir later reveals that Ahana is his future wife. Meanwhile, Vansh challenges Riddhima to prove her love for him by killing Kabir. When Riddhima fails to do this, Vansh gets more mad. They go on a vacation where Vansh leaves her and returns to the VR mansion. At home, he holds a press conference, stating that Ahana is his wife. When Riddhima returns to the mansion, everyone claims to have forgotten her nevertheless, Sia wakes up from coma and starts calling her. Vansh, although having hatred for Riddhima, lets her stay as he wants Sia to recover. Riddhima is soon after kicked out of the mansion but Sia discloses the truth. Vansh realizes his mistakes and brings Riddhima back to the mansion and they reconcile. Soon after, Riddhima wants to find out what happened to her parents, which leaves Vansh shocked. It is later revealed that Vansh has a connection to Riddhima's parents' death. Vansh decides to marry Riddhima once again so Riddhima can focus on the wedding and not her parents however, during the marriage rituals, Riddhima learns about her parents' death. It was revealed that Ishani, Vansh's sister killed Riddhima's parents. Nevertheless, Vansh tells everyone that at the age of 15, he accidentally murdered Kabir's father and aunt. Riddhima misunderstood that Vansh had killed her parents and upon knowing the truth she punishes herself by walking on glass. However, Vansh saves and forgives her. Later, Kabir starts getting obsessed for Riddhima and realizes that he has lost her forever. Nevertheless, he doesn't accept his defeat and decides to win her back at any cost.

Later on, Riddhima becomes pregnant with Vansh's child however, Vansh is not ready to have a child because he thinks that his businesses world is too dangerous for him/her. Riddhima tries to convince him many times but he doesn't listen to her. Riddhima starts getting calls from the abortion center, but she doesn't talk to Vansh about it as she thinks it would stress him out more. However, Vansh later realizes his mistake and accepts the child. At the VR mansion, someone kidnaps Riddhima and takes her to the abortion centre but Riddhima somehow escapes and reaches the mansion. Vansh misunderstands their child for being no more and confronts Riddhima. Riddhima gets to know that Ishani was the person who had sent her to abortion centre and she reveals this to Vansh. Riddhima also tells Vansh that their baby is alive.

Vansh makes a plan to change his and Riddhima's identity to Aayansh and Shefali Malhotra and leave India. However, this plan was simply to distract their enemies. The actual plan was to fake their death in front of the family however, Aryan foils the plan. Kabir locks Vansh in a room full of fire but is later saved. Kabir tries to forcibly marry Riddhima but is saved by Vansh. Chang's goons chase Riddhima and Vansh. In order to save themselves from the goons, Vansh and Riddhima jump off the cliff.

== Cast ==
=== Main ===
- Helly Shah as Riddhima Vansh Raisinghania: A Physiotherapist and part-time Party Planner; Vansh's wife; Sara/Gayatri and Sejal's childhood friend; Kabir's ex-fiancé; (2020–2021)
- Rrahul Sudhir as Vansh Raisinghania: A Mafia Businessman; Ajay and Uma's son; Anupriya's step-son; Ishani and Sia's brother; Kabir's half brother; Riddhima's husband; Ragini's ex-fiancée; Ahana's fake husband (2020–2021)
- Vishal Vashishtha as Kabir Sharma: A Cunning Cop; Anupriya's son; Vansh, Ishani and Sia's half-brother; Neha's colleague; Riddhima's ex fiancée and Ahana's fake fiancé (2020–2021)

=== Recurring ===
- Meenakshi Sethi as Indrani Raisinghania: Ajay and Rudra's mother; Vansh, Ishani, Siya and Aryan's grandmother (2020–2021)
- Zayn Ibad Khan as Angre: Vansh's loyal employee and right-hand; Ishani's husband (2020–2021)
- Khalida Jaan as Anupriya Raisinghania (formerly sharma): Ajay's second wife; Kabir's mother; Vansh, Ishani and Sia's step-mother; Daima (fake) (2020–2021)
- Chandni Sharma as Ishani Raisinghania: Ajay and Uma's elder daughter; Vansh and Siya's sister; Anupriya's step daughter; Kabir's half sister; Sunny's ex fiancée; Angre's wife (2020–2021)
- Nikita Tiwari as Sia Raisinghania: Ajay and Uma's younger daughter; Anupriya's step daughter; Vansh and Ishani's sister; Kabir's half-sister (2020–2021)
- Geetu Bawa as Chanchal Raisinghania: Rudra's wife; Aryan's mother (2020–2021)
- Jay Zaveri as Rudra Raisinghania: Indrani's younger son; Ajay's younger brother; Chanchal's husband; Aryan's father (killed by Anupriya Sharma) (2020–2021)
- Manasvi Vashist as Aryan Raisinghania: Rudra and Chanchal's son; Kiara and Sara/Gayatri's ex love interest (2020–2021)
- Bhavya Katri as Uma Raisinghania: Ajay's first wife; Vansh, Ishani and Sia's biological mother (2020)
- Swarda Thigale/ Sushmita Banik as Ragini; Vansh's ex fiancée (killed by Kabir Sharma) (2020)
- Mansi Srivastava as Ahana: Kabir's fake fiancée; Vansh's fake wife (2020–2021)
- Muohit Joushi as Sunny: Ishani's former fiancé (2020)
- Smita Sharan as Sejal: Riddhima's childhood friend (2020)
- Aashcharya Vikas as Chitwan: A novelist who is Chanchal's brother (2020)
- Mohit Sinha as Pingle: Kabir's friend and an agent (2020)
- Rajat Swani as Mishra: Kabir's assistant (2020)
- Madhurima Tuli as Neha: A secret agent and Kabir's colleague (2020) (Dead)
- Sushma Murudkar as Mrs. D'Souza: VR Mansion's housekeeper (killed by Anupriya Sharma) (2020)

=== Special appearances ===
- Jigyasa Singh as Heer Singh from Shakti - Astitva Ke Ehsaas Ki (2020)
- Akshit Sukhija as Raja Reshammiya from Shubharambh (2020)
- Mahima Makwana as Rani Dave Reshammiya from Shubharambh (2020)
- Riya Sharma as Mayura Dubey from Pinjra Khoobsurti Ka (2020)
- Sahil Uppal as Omkaar Shukla from Pinjra Khoobsurti Ka (2020)
- Nimrit Kaur Ahluwalia as Meher Kaur Gill from Choti Sarrdaarni (2020)

== Production ==
=== Development and premiere ===
The first promo of the series was released on 22 January 2020 while the second appeared on 10 March 2020. The second promo revealed that the series would premiere on 30 March 2020. However, due to COVID-19 pandemic, it was postponed to 13 July 2020.

=== Filming ===
On 24 September 2020, the filming was stopped for a few days when lead Rrahul Sudhir tested positive for COVID-19 but after his negative testing report, filming resumed thereafter.

=== Extension ===
Ishq Mein Marjawan 2 got an extension titled Ishq Mein Marjawan 2: Naya Safar aired from 15 March 2021 to 5 July 2021, replacing Ishq Mein Marjawan 2 on Voot.

== Adaptations ==
| Language | Title | Original release | Networks(s) | Last aired | Notes |
|---|---|---|---|---|---|
| Tamil | Mandhira Punnagai மந்திர புன்னகை | 1 August 2022 | Colors Tamil | 25 November 2022 | Remake |

== Episodes ==
| No. | Title | Original release date |
|---|---|---|
| 1 | "The tragic love saga unfolds!" | 13 July 2020 |
Riddhima proposes the only love of her life Kabir, but destiny takes a drastic turn when Kabir chooses to hold his response and rushes to chase his arch-enemy, Vansh Raisinghania.
| 2 | "Kabir confronts Vansh!" | 14 July 2020 |
After mercilessly killing Neha, Vansh Raisinghania attempts to escape but meets his fate, Kabir, who demands Vansh to surrender at gunpoint.
| 3 | "Riddhima gets caught spying!" | 15 July 2020 |
The love for Kabir takes Riddhima to that extra mile as she agrees to spy Vansh, a rich businessman who has built an empire on his criminal acts. However, their plan nears the brink of failure when Riddhima is caught wearing spy equipment by the detector.
| 4 | "Riddhima is interrogated!" | 16 July 2020 |
Siya tells everybody that Riddhima is harmless and that she is a simple physiotherapist, only trying to help her. However, Vansh is still not sure if Ridhima is telling the truth about herself or is she still hiding something from everyone. He is hell bent on finding the truth about her and exposing her lies, because if one thing he cannot tolerate, it's someone lying to his face.
| 5 | "Vansh's offer to Riddhima" | 17 July 2020 |
The relationship between Ridhima and Vansh has always been estranged and Vansh does not yet trust Rdhima and her dwindling truths. But his sister Sia, has developed a liking for Ridhima and wants her to be around to look after her. Giving in to his sister’s wishes, however, Vansh is still not convinced that Ridhima is telling the truth. But he offers the job to be Sia’s physiotherapist to Ridhima.
| 6 | "Vansh gets suspicious" | 20 July 2020 |
Vansh for once has decided to do something for Ridhma to make her feel comfortable. He escorts Ridhima to her new room, which he has had especially built for her. The room he has made is the exact replica of her hostel room, so she feels comfortable and feels at home. It has the same decor, the same curtains and the same photographs. But standing in that room with Vansh terrifies Ridhima, and Vansh notices this.
| 7 | "Riddhima breaks the house rules" | 21 July 2020 |
Vansh and Ridhima’s relationship has again come to a standstill. Vansh has always been suspicious of Ridhima, her reality, her identity and her motive to be around him and his sister. Up until now he has believed everything she has revealed about herself to be a lie. But today the game has gone to the next level. Vansh has put forth a gun on Ridhima’s head. Willing to shoot if not answered truthfully today.
| 8 | "Riddhima slaps Aryan!" | 22 July 2020 |
Riddhima's heart starts pounding when she is confronted by the Raisinghanias for breaking the house rules on the very first day of her job. However, the situation takes a turn for the worse when Vansh's brother, Aryan, tries to cross his limits and, in return, receives a tight slap from Riddhima!
| 9 | "Riddhima in trouble, again!" | 23 July 2020 |
Riddhima's streak of bad luck continues after she gets into trouble by breaking the house rules again after Vansh catches her strolling through the backyard. But this time, Vansh does not take it as lightly as he did before.
| 10 | "Vansh accuses Riddhima!" | 24 July 2020 |
The suspicion around Riddhima grows as Vansh gets his hand on the makeup kit and cross-examines her. Moreover, he discovers that the makeup kit as a concealed transmitter inside it and accuses Riddhima of secretively spying on their family.
| 11 | "Riddhima is caught red-handed!" | 25 July 2020 |
Riddhima breathes a sigh of relief when Kabir manages to deflect Vansh's suspicion to Aryan instead of her. Upon being given a day to prove her innocence, Riddhima tries to send a signal to Kabir for help by putting a red cloth outside the house but gets caught in the act.
| 12 | "Kabir disguises to rescue Riddhima!" | 26 July 2020 |
Kabir disguises as an electrician and enters inside Vansh's house to rescue Riddhima. However, Vansh smells something fishy and orders to lock down the mansion when Kabir disables the electricity and tries to approach her.
| 13 | "Riddhima's grievous mistake!" | 27 July 2020 |
After Kabir escapes the mansion, an adamant Vansh grows more suspicious towards Riddhima and resolves to find the invader. Thereupon, Vansh gifts a new phone to Riddhima and without thinking about the consequences, she calls Kabir out of sheer excitement.
| 14 | "Riddhima decides to leave" | 29 July 2020 |
Riddhima is left relieved when the person being beaten up mercilessly by Vansh is not Kabir but someone else. However, noticing many innocent people being hurt, she hands her resignation to Vansh but is not permitted to leave.
| 15 | "Riddhima to marry Vansh!?" | 30 July 2020 |
Riddhima gives her resignation letter to Vansh and walks out of the house. But before she could step out of the house, the gate is closed and she is escorted back to the house. Vansh tells her that his house is like a prison, to which only the entry is allowed but no one can leave without his will. She is now a prisoner in the house, and cannot leave by giving him a piece of paper. But this is not all, Vansh has announced that she will marry him in three days, and to say no to him is not an option.
| 16 | "Riddhima-Vansh get engaged!" | 31 July 2020 |
Unable to find a way out of Vansh's clutches, Riddhima decides to make use of the situation by finding proof of his illegal businesses. To make her plan work flawlessly, she agrees to marry Vansh, and the two exchange rings and become engaged. There are only three days left until the wedding.
| 17 | "Riddhima in a tight spot!" | 1 August 2020 |
After finding an opportunity to search for proof against Vansh, Riddhima accumulates the courage and enters a prohibited room that might contain evidence of his involvement in illegal practices. However, a sudden shock engulfs her senses as she tries to sneak out of the room when she realises that the door has been locked from outside!
| 18 | "Riddhima injures herself!" | 1 August 2020 |
To sabotage the mehendi ceremony, Riddhima takes an impulsive decision and burns her hand. Subsequently, everyone is shocked when they see Riddhima's injured hand.
| 19 | "Riddhima takes measures" | 4 August 2020 |
Tension mounts between Vansh and Riddhima as he senses something wrong with her behaviour whereas she plans to get the pen drive with evidence against Vansh to a safe spot before he locates it.
| 20 | "Riddhima connects the dots" | 5 August 2020 |
Riddhima dumps Shera in the bowl of turmeric just when Vansh changes the dressing on her wound. However, once her Haldi ceremony commences, Riddhima is shocked to discover that Shera is nowhere in the turmeric bowls and tries to connect the dots that transpired during the ceremony.
| 21 | "Riddhima to sabotage the wedding?" | 6 August 2020 |
Reminiscing the time she spent with Kabir, Riddhima dreads every moment as she prepares for the wedding. In a final attempt to stall the wedding, Riddhima decides to burn her bridal dress.
| 22 | "Kabir comes to rescue Riddhima!" | 7 August 2020 |
Dressed as a bride, Riddhima feels hopeless after her attempts to find Shera fail before her forceful wedding with Vansh and is surprised to see her love, Kabir, who comes to rescue her!
| 23 | "Riddhima changes her decision" | 8 August 2020 |
Riddhima takes a sigh of relief when she sees Kabir arriving for her rescue. Meanwhile, after failing to find Riddhima anywhere in the mansion, the family assumes that she has fled, but she appears at the wedding venue fully vibrant.
| 24 | "Riddhima to marry Vansh?" | 10 August 2020 |
To everyone's surprise, Riddhima returns to the Mandap, and the wedding ceremony begins. As the priest recites the rituals, Riddhima recollects her conversation with Kabir and his request to marry Vansh.
| 25 | "Vansh brings a deadly gift" | 11 August 2020 |
After the wedding, Vansh discovers the precious jewel, Shera, in Riddhima's room and realises that she is the one who is spying on him. To uncover the truth, he holds her at gunpoint and questions her loyalty to the family.
| 26 | "Vansh lays a trap!" | 12 August 2020 |
Vansh sets a trap by breaking the precious jewel Shera into small pieces and gives them to Riddhima. However, his suspicion turns out to be false as she refuses to recognise the jewel and shows no sign of panic or fear.
| 27 | "Vansh is outraged!" | 13 August 2020 |
Riddhima becomes accustomed to her marriage with Vansh, however, she soon finds Vansh scolding his housemaid for stepping in the backyard without his permission.
| 28 | "A new mystery for Riddhima!" | 14 August 2020 |
Riddhima finds the right opportunity and escapes to find evidence against Vansh's illegal business empire. Her efforts come to fruition when she stumbles upon a mysterious statue, hidden in the Raisinghania mansion.
| 29 | "Vansh's surprising move!" | 15 August 2020 |
After getting caught by Vansh for trespassing into the mansion's backyard and trying to know about the ring on the mysterious statue, Riddhima limits herself from breaking the laws of the house. But to her surprise, Vansh confronts her and puts that very ring on her finger.
| 30 | "Riddhima receives an ultimatum" | 17 August 2020 |
Riddhima tries to force Siya to tell her the truth about the statue and the ring that the statue had on its fingers. Siya's mother comes into the room and reprimands Riddhima for behaving like a spy in the house and not like a daughter-in-law. She warns her that if she continues with such behaviour, she will have to face fierce consequences because the house has certain rules to which she will have to abide by.
| 31 | "Riddhima tries to connect the dots" | 18 August 2020 |
Anupriya warns Riddhima to stay out of any matter concerning Ragini and reveals that she is no more. Riddhima begins connecting the dots and owing to his temperament, she immediately suspects Vansh to be the murderer. Assuming that this was the mission she was sent on, Riddhima decides to inform Kabir of her finding.
