= Devanshi (TV series) =

- Genre: Drama
- Created by: Sonali Jaffer; Amir Jaffer
- Written by: Gitangshu Dey; Khanna Devyana; Vandana Tewari; Ritu Goel; Kovid Gupta; Girish Dhamija
- Directed by: Anshoo Shyam
- Creative directors: Ashish batra (cd) sunayana krashanavanshi (ach)
- Starring: See below
- Composers: Dony Hazarika; Udbhav Ojha
- Country of origin: India
- Original language: Hindi
- No. of episodes: 324

Production
- Producers: Sonali Jaffer; Amir Jaffer
- Camera setup: Multi-camera
- Running time: 22 minutes
- Production company: Full House Media

Original release
- Network: Colors TV
- Release: 3 October 2016 – 29 September 2017

Devanshi is an Indian Hindi drama television series which broadcast on Colors TV. It is produced by Full House Media of Sonali Jaffer and Amir Jaffer. The final broadcast was on 29 September 2017.

== Plot ==
The show is set in Haryana. It focuses on issues related to superstition. The plot revolves around a child named Devanshi "divinely" selected as a dedication to the goddess. The mystery is that the innocence of the child outwits the wiles of adults around her.

=== 14-year leap ===
After 14 years, Devanshi and Sakshi have grown up and both left Jwalapuri as per their father's wish. However, due her to sister's mental illness, she has to come back to Jwalapuri again. Sakshi becomes an obstacle in the path of the divas. Instead of Sakshi, Devanshi becomes a target of fire bow but Vardhan, now a little cruel towards this superstitious belief, saves her. The villagers mistake Sakshi for Devanshi and Devanshi for Sakshi. They both become targets of the angry villagers and Kusum, but Vardhan always saves them. Meanwhile, Devanshi and Vardhan start falling for each other. After all everyone finds out that Devanshi is Sakshi and Sakshi is Devanshi. Due to this Sakshi is cured of her mental illness and falls in love with Vardhan, but soon realizes that Vardhan is in love with Devanshi. Devanshi finds out about Kusum's sins including her parents' death. Sakshi and Kusum start plotting against Devanshi, but later Sakshi realizes that Devanshi loves her a lot and stops her plotting. Kusum tries to kill her and Devanshi asks her to leave for while, so Sakshi does. Devanshi and Vardhan get married. With Ishwar's help, she exposes Kusum in front of the villagers, but Kusum manages to escape with Mohan's help. There comes Menka, who is married to Vardhan's cousin Golu, but she is in love with Vardhan. Kusum enters as Menka's bua and plots against Devanshi. Devanshi and Vardhan consummate when Kusum and Mohan try to make Menka and Vardhan close. Devanshi gets pregnant, but is framed that she is having illegitimate child. Ishwar dies from a heart attack caused by Kusum. The villagers try to kill Devanshi and she falls in the river and loses her child. She plans her revenge.

=== 10 months later ===
Everyone thinks that Devanshi is dead, while she has become a business woman named Kalki Shah. She returns to Jwalapuri and makes everyone's life difficult. She makes Mohan and Kusum against each other, wins Nutan, Bhupi and tries to separate Menka and Vardaan. Kusum eventually tries to make Vardaan and Kalki fall for each other and marry, because Kalki's husband will get 50% of her property. This makes Menka really jealous and she tries to kill Kalki and put the blame on Kusum. But there comes Pavan Bakshi, who loves Kalki, and states that Kalki is his wife and eventually saves her from Menka's deadly trap. Pavan starts falling in love with Devanshi whilst helping her and does not want her to go back with Vardaan so starts plotting against her. Eventually, she is successful in helping Vardaan see that Menka is only after his money and thus their wedding does not happen. Vardaan later on learns about the innocence of Devanshi and his sadness melts Kalki's heart who wanted to make his life difficult. Furthermore, she exposes the truth about Kusum Sundari once again to everyone with the help of Pavan who wants to save Devanshi from Kusum, Mohan and the villagers. An 11-year-old girl comes out of the hundi who happens to be called Kalki and tells everyone she is from an orphanage and to leave 'Devanshi didi' alone. When Vardaan finds out the whole truth, he is initially very upset with himself and tries to kill himself but Devanshi stops him, deciding to give him another chance.

Kusum Sundari and Mohan are arrested by the police, although Mohan tries to escape so Pavan and Vardaan chase after him to kill him. Devanshi comes and see them and is upset with them for trying to kill Mohan. The police inspector asks who hit Mohan on the head last. Devanshi saw Vardaan hit him last but doesn't want Vardaan to go to jail. Pavan decides to take the blame on himself for Devanshi's happiness. He tells Devanshi the truth that he was plotting against her because he did not want her to be with Vardaan and that he has realizes what true love is. The police are about to take Pavan away but she stops them. She tells the police that it was actually Vardaan who hit Mohan. Vardaan is shocked. Devanshi assures him that she will get him out of jail but she cannot lie and so she hopes he will understand. However, much to her shock he pushes her away and accuses her of telling the police the truth to get revenge on him so that she can be with Pavan. Pavan comes to her rescue. She tells Vardaan he is not worth her love. Vardaan goes with the police. She is angry with Pavan because he betrayed her trust by plotting against her. Kalki(child) later reminds Devanshi that Pavan saved her life and deserves a second chance. She also makes Pavan her brother. Vardaan begins plotting against Devanshi.

Another villain enters in their lives: she is the child of Kukarni Devi who is against Maiyya and targets Kalki (child). Kukarni Devi's child takes the avatar of Pavan's sister who is called Maya. Her truth is exposed and Pavan and Devanshi decide to fight against her together. Vardaan becomes jealous when he enters the house and sees Pavan with Devanshi. At first, he tries to remind Devanshi that he is her husband though this results in her becoming angry as he is forcing himself on her. She decides to divorce Vardaan though he refuses to divorce and creates trouble for her. Soon, Vardaan is murdered by Mohan for revenge. After defeating all the major villains in the show, Pavan and Devanshi get married because Devanshi realizes Pavan's true love for her and reciprocates. They live happily ever with Kalki.

== Cast ==
=== Main ===
- Karuna Pandey as Mata Kusum Sundari Choudhary: Ishwar's widow and murderer; Vardaan's mother; Gayatri, Rasik and Ishwar's killer (2016–2017)
- Helly Shah as Devanshi Bakshi: Gayatri and Rasik's daughter; Sarla and Omi's adopted daughter; Sakshi's foster sister; Vardaan's widow; Pawan's wife (2017)
  - Kashvi Kothari as Young Devanshi Upadhyay (2016–2017)
- Piyush Sahdev as Pawan Bakshi: Maya's brother; Devanshi's second husband (2017)
- Mudit Nayar as Vardaan Choudhary: Kusum and Ishwar's son; Devanshi's husband (2017) (dead)
  - Viraj Kapoor as Young Vardaan Choudhary (2016–2017)

=== Recurring ===
- Saniya Touqeer as Kalki Shah: Maya's daughter (2017)
- Dhruvee Haldankar as Maya Shah/Aveela Kapoor: Pawan's sister; Kalki's mother (2017)
- Aamir Dalvi as Mohan Singh: Kusum's servant; Gayatri, Rasik, Ishwar and Vardaan's killer (2016–2017)
- Reema Vohra as Nutan Choudhary: Bhupi's wife; Golu's mother (2016–2017)
- Hetal Puniwala as Bhupendra "Bhupi" Choudhary: Ishwar's brother; Nutan's husband; Golu's father (2016–2017)
- Shahab Khan as Ishwarchand Choudhary (dead) (2016–2017)
- Arha Mahajan as Young Sakshi Bhatnagar: Sarla and Omi's daughter; Devanshi's foster sister (2016–2017)
- Anjum Fakih as Sakshi Bhatnagar: Sarla and Omi's daughter; Devanshi's foster sister (2017)
- Nisha Nagpal as Menaka Yadav: Vardaan's obsessed lover; Golu's ex-wife (2017)
- Gaurav Singh as Rahul "Golu" Choudhary: Nutan and Bhupi's son; Menaka's ex-husband (2017)
- Gaurav Sharma as Shikhar Sharma: Devanshi's friend (2017)
- Sshrey Pareek as Ashutosh "Ashu" Ojaswal (2017)
- Priyanka Khera as Rajwinda "Rajjo" Chaddha (2017)
- Ankita Sharma as Sarla Bhatnagar: Omi's wife; Devanshi's adoptive mother; Sakshi's mother (2016–2017)
- Pankaj Bhatia as Omendra "Omi" Bhatnagar: Sarla's husband; Devanshi's adoptive father; Sakshi's father (2016–2017)
- Dolphin Dwivedi as Geeta Choudhary (2016–17)
- Preeti Chaudhary as Gayatri Upadhyay: Rasik's wife; Devanshi's mother (2016)
- Mazher Sayed as Rasik Upadhyay: Gayatri's husband; Devanshi's father (2016)

=== Special appearance ===
- Varun Kapoor as Dr. Veer Malhotra froom Savitri Devi College & Hospital

== Awards and nominations ==
Year	Award	Category	Recipient	Result
2017	Indian Television Academy Awards	Best Actress (Popular)	Helly Shah	Won
2017	Golden Petal Awards	Best debut	Kashvi Kothari	Nominated
2017	Golden Petal Awards	Best comic in a fiction series	Reema Vohra	Nominated
2017	Golden Petal Awards	Best Actress in a Negative Role	Karuna Pandey	Won
