= Bayttaab Dil Kee Tamanna Hai =

- Genre: Soap opera
- Written by: Sandiip Sikcand, Vipul Mehta & Fatima Rangila; Dialogues: Rekkha Modi
- Starring: Sumana Das; Varun Kapoor; Aman Verma; Karan Kundra; Priyamvada Kant; Urvashi Dholakia; Pragati Chourasiya; Ashlesha Sawant
- Country of origin: India
- Original language: Hindi
- No. of episodes: 82

Production
- Producers: Ekta Kapoor; Shobha Kapoor
- Cinematography: Suhas Shirodkar; Rajan Singh; Sanjay Malwankar; Ashish Sharma; Dannie
- Editors: Sanjeev Shukla; Joydeep Nath; Vikas Sharma; Sandeep Bhatt
- Running time: 24 mins
- Production company: Balaji Telefilms

Original release
- Network: Sony Entertainment Television
- Release: 6 October 2009 – 24 February 2010

Bayttaab Dil Kee Tamanna Hai is an Indian television series that aired on Sony Entertainment Television. It premiered on 6 October 2009 and concluded on 24 February 2010. The channel reportedly spent Rs. 50 million to promote the series on Indian news channels, such as Aaj Tak and STAR News. The series was created by Ekta Kapoor and was produced by her production company Balaji Telefilms.

== Plot ==
Three sisters, Shamoli, Kanchan and Kakoon arrive in Mumbai from their village in search of a better means of livelihood. At first, they have to face terrible hardships in the new city. However, soon they find help from Veeru, the chauffeur and protégé of a powerful and wealthy lawyer named Kunal Mehra, who has never faced defeat in a single case. Veeru employs Kanchan and Shamoli as maids in Kunal's home. Shamoli impresses Kunal with her presence of mind, and once saves him from a very difficult situation. The middle-aged Kunal, a confirmed bachelor for years, though at first avoids Shamoli because of her status, later feels attracted and proposes to her, leaving Shamoli in confusion. He does not know that she and Veeru love each other. Unknown to them all, Kanchan also silently loves Veeru.

Kakoon, the little sister, has a major accident and needs expensive treatment at once. Veeru tries his best to help and even takes loans, but that is still insufficient. Meanwhile, Kunal has proposed to Shamoli to either marry him or leave. Being rich, only Kunal is in a position to help, so Shamoli having no other alternative quickly decides to accept his proposal and marries him. This angers Veeru and Kanchan, who believe Shamoli has lost her head over Kunal's wealth. Rejected by her loved ones, Shamoli struggles to be accepted in her husband's elite social circle, where she is often tormented and humiliated by Karishma, the wife of Kunal's brother. She gradually falls in love with Kunal.

Shamoli's resolve is tested further when Veeru comes to live in Kunal's house, following a surprise revelation that the two men are long-lost brothers. Kunal then learns the truth that Shamoli had married him only to save her little sister's life and that she used to love Veeru. He becomes upset and in anger, drives both Shamoli and Veeru out of his house. However, he later feels regret and decides to set her free from their marriage, send her back to Veeru and leave the city. However, Shamoli realizes that she now loves Kunal and not Veeru, so she chooses to stay with her husband. Kanchan and Shamoli reconcile with each other. Veeru accepts the fact that Shamoli is now Kunal's wife and despite Kunal's insistence to stay with them, decides to stay away from them until he achieves his dream of becoming a lawyer.

In the end, Veeru accomplishes his goal and marries Kanchan, giving recognition to her love for him. He then pays a visit to his brother's house, and the show ends with both the brothers and the sisters united.

== Cast ==
- Sumana Das as Shamoli Kunal Mehra
- Aman Verma as Advocate Kunal Mehra
- Karan Kundra as Veeru
- Priyamvada Kant as Kanchan
- Pragati Chourasiya as Kakoon
- Varun Kapoor as Varun Mehra
- Urvashi Dholakia as Karishma Mehra
- Nitin Chatterjee as Aarav (Veeru's confidant & childhood friend)
- Ashlesha Sawant as Lekha

== Crossover ==
A special crossover with Pyaar Ka Bandhan aired on 24 December 2009 and 28 December 2009 on Sony Entertainment Television.
