= Varun Kapoor =

Indian actor (born 1986)

- Born: 28 August 1986 (age 39); Ahmedabad, Gujarat, India
- Occupation: Actor
- Years active: 2008–present
- Known for: Swaragini – Jodein Rishton Ke Sur; Savitri Devi College & Hospital
- Spouse: Dhanya Mohan (m. 2013; div. 2025)

Varun Kapoor (born 28 August 1986) is an Indian actor who primarily works in Hindi television. Kapoor is best known for playing Sanskaar Maheshwari in Swaragini – Jodein Rishton Ke Sur and Dr. Veer Malhotra in Savitri Devi College & Hospital. In 2022, he made his film debut with Gangubai Kathiawadi.

== Early life ==
Kapoor was born on 28 August 1986 in Ahmedabad, Gujarat, into a Gujarati Hindu family. He did his schooling from St. Kabir School, Vadodara and graduated in Electronic Engineering from Sinhgad College of Engineering, Pune. He went to Bloomington for further studies.

== Career ==
Kapoor has played the role of Varun in Kis Desh Mein Hai Meraa Dil, Neil in Tujh Sang Preet Lagai Sajna, Varun in Bayttaab Dil Kee Tamanna Hai, Shaurya in Na Aana Is Des Laado, Kabir in Humse Hai Liife, Mahish/Mahishasura in Maharakshak: Devi and Danny Vyas in Saraswatichandra.

From 2015 to 2016, he portrayed Sanskaar Maheshwari in Swaragini - Jodein Rishton Ke Sur opposite Helly Shah, for which he was awarded the Best Actor Male at Golden Petal Awards 2016.

From 2017 to 2018, Kapoor played the role of Dr. Veer Malhotra in Savitri Devi College & Hospital on Colors TV opposite Swarda Thigale.

Kapoor made his Hindi film debut in the 2022 film Gangubai Kathiawadi. He played Ramnik Laal opposite Alia Bhatt, who pretended to be in love with Gangu and then proceeded to sell her into prostitution. The film was a commercial success and emerged as the fifth highest grossing Hindi films of the year.

== Personal life ==
Kapoor married Dhanya Mohan in 2013. She works with Air India. The couple divorced in 2025.

== Filmography ==
=== Films ===
Year	Title	Role	Notes	Ref.
2022	Gangubai Kathiawadi	Ramnik Laal		

=== Television ===
Year	Title	Role	Notes	Ref.
2008	Kis Desh Mein Hai Meraa Dil	Varun Gangotre		
2008–2009	Tujh Sang Preet Lagai Sajna	Neil		
2009–2010	Bayttaab Dil Kee Tamanna Hai	Varun Mehra		
2010–2011	Na Aana Is Des Laado	Shaurya Pratapsingh		
2012	Humse Hai Liife	Kabir Lazarus		
2013–2014	Saraswatichandra	Danny Vyas		
2015	Maharakshak: Devi	Mahesh Sarna / Mahishasura		
2015–2016	Swaragini – Jodein Rishton Ke Sur	Sanskaar Maheshwari		
2017–2018	Savitri Devi College & Hospital	Dr. Veer Malhotra		

==== Special appearances ====
Year	Title	Role	Ref.
2016	Comedy Nights Live	Sanskaar Maheshwari	
2016	Comedy Nights Bachao	Sanskaar Maheshwari	
2017	Shakti – Astitva Ke Ehsaas Ki	Dr. Veer Malhotra	
2017	Devanshi	Dr. Veer Malhotra	
2018	Tu Aashiqui	Dr. Veer Malhotra	

=== Web series ===
Year	Title	Role	Notes	Ref.
2023	Fireflies: Parth Aur Jugnu	Laffu		

=== Music videos ===
Year	Title	Singer	Ref.
2022	Tera Rahoon	Amit Mishra	

== Awards and nominations ==
Year	Award	Category	Work	Result	Ref.
2016	Asian Viewers Television Awards	Male Actor Of The Year	Swaragini	Nominated	
2016	Golden Petal Awards	Best Actor	Swaragini	Won	
2016	Golden Petal Awards	Favourite Jodi (with Helly Shah)	Swaragini	Won	
