= Roop Durgapal =

Indian television actress

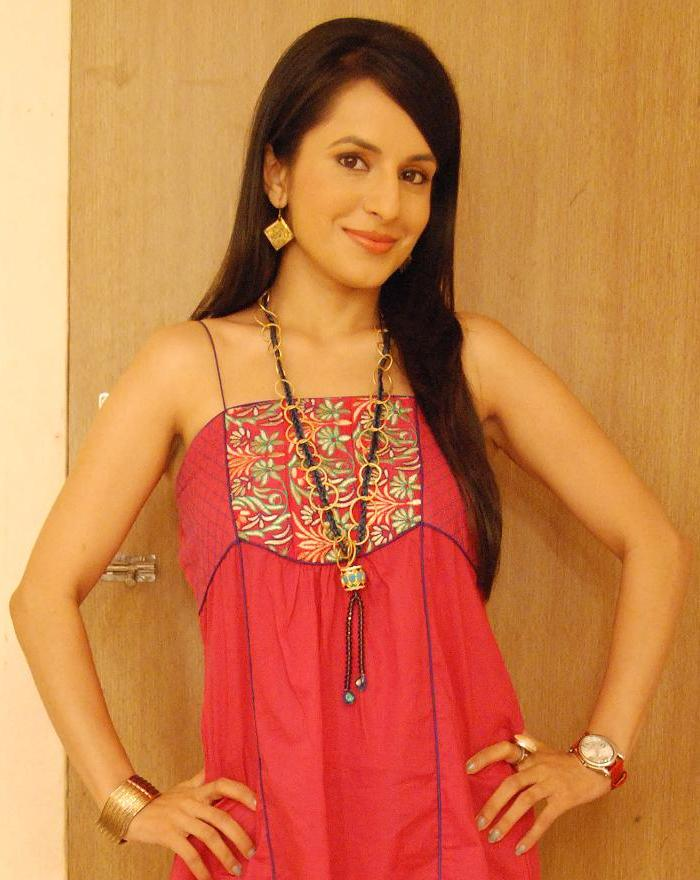
- A photograph of Roop Durgapal, an Indian television actress active from 2011
- Born: Almora, Uttar Pradesh (now in Uttarakhand), India
- Occupation: Actress
- Years active: 2011–present

Roop Durgapal is an Indian television actress. She is best known for her role as Sanchi in the serial Balika Vadhu.

== Early life and career ==
Roop Durgapal was born in Almora, Uttarakhand, India. She earned a Bachelor of Technology degree in Instrumentation and Control Engineering at Graphic Era Deemed To Be University in 2006, and worked at Infosys before starting her career in acting.

Durgapal played Sanchi in the serial Balika Vadhu from 2012 to 2015. She has played characters in Babosa Mere Bhagwan, Shama, and played Dari Dari Pari in the children's show Baal Veer.

In March 2015, she made a guest appearance as an ichchhadhari naagin, a mythical shapeshifting snake, in Akbar Birbal. She has also appeared in television advertisements.

In February 2016, she played the role of Kavya Maheshwari in Swaragini on Colors, and in April 2016 she played Natasha Gujral in Kuch Rang Pyar Ke Aise Bhi on Sony TV.

In June 2016, once again she made a guest appearance in Big Magic's Akbar Birbal as Birbal, playing a man's role for the first time. It was announced in August 2016 that the actress would be joining the serial Gangaa in the role of Supriya.

In October 2018, Durgapal played the lead role of a lawyer, Sharmishtha, in Zing TV's love stories based episodic show Pyaar Pehli Baar, which was a revamp of "Pyaar Tune Kya Kiya (TV series)".

Durgapal has joined Zee Tv's series Tujhse Hai Raabta, playing a Maharshtrian girl, Ketki, for the first time in July 2019.

In September 2019, it was announced that she will be joining the team of CIF, on Dangal TV as the new Forensic Doctor, Sakshi Shrivastava. In October 2019, she became a part of the romantic horror show Laal Ishq on &tv.

In February 2020, Roop played the protagonist Sonia in another supernatural story "Patal Danav" of Laal Ishq on &tv. In March 2020, for the third time, Roop played the protagonist Aleesha in supernatural story "Mayavi Shakhi" of Laal Ishq on &tv.

Durgapal was nominated as "Most Tez Taraar Personality" in the 2013 Colors Golden Petal Awards.

== Web Series ==
- 2023 Campus Beats as Piyali
- 2026 Sankalp as Madhuri

== Television ==
- 2012 CID as Sunita (Episode 794)
- 2012–2013 Baal Veer as Dari Pari
- 2012–2015 Balika Vadhu as Sanchi Kabra (née Shekhar)
- 2015 Akbar Birbal as Ichhadhari Nagin
- 2016 Swaragini - Jodein Rishton Ke Sur as Kavya Maheshwari (née Malhotra)
- 2016 Kuch Rang Pyar Ke Aise Bhi as Natasha Gujral
- 2016 Akbar Birbal as Rekha Madhuri aka Female Birbal
- 2016-2017 Gangaa as Supriya Chaturvedi
- 2017 Waaris as Sakshi
- 2018 Pyaar Pehli Baar as Sharmishtha
- 2019 Tujhse Hai Raabta as Ketki Walia (Episode 247-Episode 256; Episode 260-Episode 271)
- 2019 CIF as Dr. Sakshi Srivastav (Episode 08)
- November 2019 Laal Ishq as Kajal
- February 2020 Laal Ishq as Sonia
- March 2020 Laal Ishq as Aleesha
- 2021 Kuch Rang Pyar Ke Aise Bhi as Natasha Gujral

== See also ==
- List of Indian television actresses
