= Deda (film) =

Indian Gujarati film by Hema Shukla

- Official Poster
- Directed by: Hema Shukla
- Written by: Hema Shukla
- Produced by: Brijesh Narola
- Starring: Gaurav Paswala; Helly Shah
- Production company: Brijraj Entertainment
- Release date: 4 July 2025
- Country: India
- Language: Gujarati

Deda is an Indian Gujarati-language family drama film written and directed by Hema Shukla and produced by Brijesh Narola under the banner of Brijraj Entertainment, the film features Gaurav Paswala and Helly Shah in lead roles.

The film is scheduled to be released on 4 July 2025.

== Cast ==
- Gaurav Paswala
- Helly Shah
- Sonali Lele Desai
- Mehul Buch
- Hiten Tejwani
- Sanjay Galsar
- Chetan Daiya
- Asrani

== Reception ==
Kanksha Vasavada of Times of India said that “Hema Shukla’s directorial debut, Deda, is a heartwarming story nicely directed and presented on screen, with an impressive music and background score that adds great effect to the emotion of the film, and Gaurav Paswala’s intense performance can be counted as one of his finest in his career.” Kishan Prajapati of Gujarati Jagaran said that “The story of the film Deda revolves around an ordinary middle-class father who continues to struggle steadfastly for his family even in the face of life’s toughest circumstances.”

== Release ==
The film is released on 4 July 2025.
