= Gangaa =

Indian drama television series

- Also known as: Sagar Ki Gangaa
- Genre: Drama; Romance
- Written by: Rajita Sharma; Zama Habib
- Directed by: Waseem Sabir; Yusuf Ansari
- Creative director: Shikha Vij
- Starring: Aditi Sharma; Vishal Vashishtha; Shakti Anand
- Opening theme: Ganga Bahi Chali Jaye; Ishq Nasheen
- Composer: Ashish Rego
- Country of origin: India
- Original language: Hindi
- No. of seasons: 3
- No. of episodes: 595

Production
- Executive producer: Sumeet Dubey
- Producers: Sunjoy Waddhwa; Comall S. Waddhwa
- Camera setup: Multi-camera
- Running time: 24 minutes
- Production company: Sphere Origins

Original release
- Network: &TV
- Release: 2 March 2015 – 2 June 2017

Gangaa (also known as Sagar Ki Gangaa) is an Indian, Hindi-language, television soap opera that premiered on 2 March 2015 on &TV. The show ended on 2 June 2017 after 595 episodes. The show was produced by Sphere Origins and initially starred child actors Swar Hingonia as child Sagar, Ruhana Khanna as child Gangaa and Raj Singh Verma as Gangaa's father (Bappa). When Gangaa and Sagar grew up, the child actors were replaced with Aditi Sharma and Vishal Vashishtha.

On 29 August 2016, on Janmashtami, Ruhana Khanna, who played child Gangaa, made her comeback as Gangaa and Sagar's daughter Krishna, eight months after being replaced by Aditi Sharma as grown up Gangaa.

On January 16, 2017, the show was revamped; the storyline and the entire cast including lead Vishal Vashishtha, who played the grown up Sagar, except Aditi Sharma who continued to play the role of Gangaa, changed. Shakti Anand was the new lead as Shiv opposite Sharma. The other actors left the show. In October 2018 the show aired on Zee World.

== Episodes ==
Season	Episodes	Original Broadcast	
Season	Episodes	Premiere	Finale
1	205	12 January 2015	5 September 2015
2	292	7 September 2015	16 January 2017
3	98	17 January 2017	9 September 2017

The first season of Gangaa Childhood Gangaa.

Gangaa Shukla is a sweet 7-year-old child who lives with her father, Varun Shukla. Varun fixes her marriage, but Gangaa is left alone as both Varun and her husband are killed in Varanasi stampede. Gangaa is forced to live as a widow. Advocate Niranjan Chaturvedi, rescues Gangaa and adopts her. Soon, Gangaa is accepted by Niranjan's family including his wife, Madhvi and two sons, Pulkit and Sagar except Niranjan's mother, Kanta who treats her like a widowed servant.

Eventually, Gangaa and Sagar become good friends. They compete in ingenuity, sometimes even in conflict, to unmask the low blows of certain. However, Sagar is revealed to have a hole in his heart. He had to apply vermilion on Gangaa's forehead. After Sagar's recovery, Madhvi and Kanta plan to take Sagar to London to pursue his studies, thinking Sagar would be away from them because of Gangaa. Since then, Sagar and Gangaa are separated.

=== 10 years later ===
10 years later in Gangaa; Sagar ki Gangaa.

Gangaa is now grown up and happens to be in love with Sagar. She has been putting on her vermilion for 10 years not only to protect him, but also to respect her spouse status. Madhvi, Sagar's mother fails in her mission to separate her from her son when they finally meet. It turns out that Sagar came back from London with Janvi, his girlfriend and Sahil, Janvi's brother.

Gangaa doesn't like Janvi and Sahil's company. Her hopes are shattered upon learning about the relationship between Sagar and Jaanvi as well as the unrequited feelings there are between her and Sagar.

But gradually, Sagar cares and supports Gangaa. Finally, he understand that he falls in love of her and expresses his love by applying vermilion on Gangaa in front of the family. As Chaturvedis' object this, Sagar and Gangaa want leave for Delhi for a court marriage. But a misunderstanding causes their immediate separation as Sagar marries Jaanvi on a whim.

Seeing the mistreatment Jaanvi is getting from Sagar for not loving her, Yash, Sagar's cousin, regularly supplies her with drugs and urges her to commit suicide. Meanwhile, Gangaa gets her life back together and becomes the assistant of a lawyer called Palash. Sagar who is jealous of her, doesn't hesitate to show it as he neglects his wife more and more. 123

A few moments later, Sagar is accused for Janvi's death. Gangaa manages to prove him innocent and Yash, the guilty, is later arrested at the same time as Palash as it turns out his love for Gangaa made him possessive to the point of hiding evidence on Sagar's case which he was handling hoping to keep him in jail. Eventually, Gangaa and Sagar's marriage is fixed after a small altercation with some charlatans..

Prabha, Yash's mother, seeks revenge on Gangaa since she was not only taken away from her son but her own husband was pronounced dead presumably due to recent events that would have led to his suicide. As conspiracy, she gives a spiked drink to Gangaa which accidentally Sagar drinks and he gets intimate with Gangaa in that state. He fails to remember what happened between him and Gangaa. On the wedding day, Gangaa is revealed to be pregnant and Sagar questions Gangaa's character. Gangaa is shattered and leaves the house. She joins with Rahat, who takes care of poor, homeless girls. Later, it is believed Rahat and Niranjan were lovers in college. After some twists, Rahat slips to her death. Niranjan takes Rahat's daughter, Zoya to his house. Sagar moves to London with Madhvi believing Niranjan doesn't care about them. Meanwhile, Gangaa gives birth to a daughter, Krishna, and decides to move on.

=== 7 years later ===
Gangaa is now a lawyer and raises Krishna alone with her friend, Kashish. Krishna is exactly look like child Gangaa. Sagar goes to Banaras on Kanta's insistence. In a jungle, he comes across Krishna and takes care of her. He knows that Krishna is Gangaa's child because she looks like young Gangaa. Eventually, Sagar and Gangaa came across each other and Krishna recognizes Sagar as the man who helped her in the jungle.

Krishna is revealed to have a hole in her heart like Sagar. Sagar is shocked, and asks Gangaa about Krishna's father. Gangaa refuses to answer him. Eventually, Sagar and Chaturvedis' are shocked on learning Krishna is Sagar's daughter. Sagar apologizes from Gangaa, who refused. Sagar sends custody papers and wins Krishna's custody. Pulkit tries to have relationship with Kashish. On family insistence, Pulkit and Supriya adopt a girl named Juwi.

Eventually, Gangaa and Sagar are reunited. Later, the family gets into a boat accident resulting Krishna to die. Gangaa goes missing and loses her memory. Sagar never returns his home, he goes in search of Gangaa and Krishna. The trauma of this whole incident results in the death of Niranjan.

The season 3 of Gangaa; Shiv ki Gangaa.

Gangaa is rescued by Shiv Jha, who was marrying a girl named Gangaa. Shiv mistakes Sagar's Gangaa as his wife. Sagar tries to find Gangaa but fails. Gangaa is welcomed to Shiv's house as his bride. She takes care of Shiv's daughter, Radhika as her own while Sagar manages to find Gangaa. Gangaa regains her memory. Shiv is shocked to finding Gangaa's truth and returns her to Sagar. However, Sagar is shot to death, making Shiv to promise that take care of Gangaa.

Gangaa and Shiv are ordered to stay together for a month. Gangaa is broken upon learning of Krishna's death. Eventually, Gangaa-Radhika closeness brings Shiv and Gangaa together. After some twists, Gangaa and Shiv confess their feelings and get married. Finally, Gangaa opens a primary school, Sagar Vidhyalaya in memory of Sagar.

== Cast ==
=== Main ===
- Aditi Sharma as Gangaa Sagar Chaturvedi/Gangaa Shiv Jha (Nee'Shukla): Varun's daughter; Niranjan and Madhvi's foster daughter; Sagar's widow; Shiv's second wife; Krishna's mother; Radhika's step-mother (2015–2017)
  - Ruhana Khanna as
    - child Gangaa Shukla (2015)
    - Krishna Chaturvedi: Gangaa and Sagar's daughter (2016–2017)
- Vishal Vashishtha as Sagar Chaturvedi: Niranjan and Madhvi's younger son; Pulkit's brother; Jahnvi's ex-fiancee; Gangaa's first husband; Krishna's father (2015–2017)
  - Swar Hingonia as child Sagar Chaturvedi (2015)
- Shakti Anand as Shiv Jha: Savitri's step-son; Pratap and Riya's brother; Parvati's widower; Gangaa's second husband; Radhika's father (2017)

=== Recurring ===
- Rajsingh Verma as Varun Shukla: Gangaa's father; Krishna's grandfather (2015) (Dead)
- Hiten Tejwani as Advocate Niranjan "Niru" Chaturvedi: Kanta's son; Madhvi's husband; Pulkit and Sagar's father; Gangaa's foster father; Krishna's grandfather; Juhi's adoptive grandfather (2015–2017) (Dead)
- Gungun Uprari as Madhvi Chaturvedi: Ratan's sister; Niranjan's widow; Pulkit and Sagar's mother; Krishna's grandmother; Juhi's adoptive grandmother (2015–2017)
- Sushmita Mukherjee as Kanta "Ammaji" Chaturvedi: Niranjan's mother; Pulkit and Sagar's grandmother; Krishna's great-grandmother; Juhi's adoptive great-grandmother (2015–2017)
- Abhishek Tiwari as Pulkit Chaturvedi: Niranjan and Madhvi's elder son; Sagar's brother; Supriya's husband; Juhi's adoptive father (2015–2017)
  - Vedant Sawant as teenage Pulkit Chaturvedi (2015)
- Nivedita Tiwari/Roop Durgapal as Supriya Chaturvedi: Pulkit's wife; Juhi's adoptive mother (2015–2017)
- Rajiv Khanna as Supriya's father (2015)
- Panchi Bora as Jahnvi: Sahil's sister; Sagar's ex-fiancée (2015–2016) (Dead)
- Gaurav Deshmukh as Sahil: Jahnvi's brother (2015–2016)
- Farukh Saeed as Sahil and Jahnvi's father (2016)
- Romanch Mehta as Ratan: Madhvi's brother; Prabha's husband; Yash's father (2015–2016) (Dead)
- Rakhee Tandon as Prabha: Ratan's wife; Yash's mother (2015–2017) (Dead)
- Akash Gill as Yash: Ratan and Prabha's son; Pulkit and Sagar's cousin; Jahnvi's murderer (2015–2017) (Dead)
  - Unknown as child Yash (2015)
- Jaya Bhattacharya as Sudha bua (2015–2016)
- Sunil Jaitley as Maharaj ji: chef at Chaturvedi's house (2015–2017)
- Rizwana Shaikh as Mehri: the Chaturvedi's maid (2015–2016)
- Arishfa Khan as Radhika Jha: Shiv and Parvati's daughter; Gangaa's step-daughter (2017)
- Utkarsha Naik as Savitri Jha: Shiv, Pratap and Riya's step-mother; Radhika's step-grandmother (2017)
- Pankaj Berry as Mr. Jha: Shiv, Pratap and Riya's father; Radhika's grandfather (2017)
- Kishwer Merchant as
  - Parvati Jha – Asha's twin-sister; Shiv's first wife; Radhika's mother (2017) (Dead)
  - Asha – Parvati's twin-sister (2017)
- Dinesh Mehta as Pratap Jha: Savitri's step-son; Shiv and Riya's brother; Jhumki's husband (2017)
- Anokhi Anand as Jhumki: Pratap's wife (2017)
- Anushka Singh as Riya Jha: Savitri's step-daughter; Shiv and Pratap's sister; Kushal's wife (2017)
- Rajesh Balwani as Kushal: Riya's husband (2017)
- Shagun Sharma as Ashi Jha (2017)
- Emir Shah as Prakash (2017)
- Pavitra Punia as Karuna
- Pooja Sethi as Drishti (2015)
- Sanjay Gandhi as Omkar: Drishti's father (2015)
- Malini Kapoor as Ginni: Prabha's socialite friend (2015)
- Priya Wal/Gunjan Vijaya as Barkha: Madhvi's cousin (2015) (Dead)
- Sameer Sharma as Raj: Barkha's boyfriend (2015)
- Jasveer Kaur as Shreya Mathur (2015)
- Pooran Kiri as Verma ji (2015)
- Vikram Mastal as teacher at Sagar school (2015)
- Nupur Alankar as Mrs. Principal (2015)
- Sumbul Touqeer as Neha: Gangaa's school classmate (2015)
- Samridh Bawa as Bal Mahant Gautam (2015)
- Mukul Nag as Mr. Chaturvedi: Kanta's husband; Niranjan's father; Pulkit and Sagar's grandfather; Krishna's great-grandfather; Juhi's adoptive great-grandfather (2015) (Dead)
- Amita Khopkar as Shanta Devi: Kanta's elder sister (2015)
- Neha Gossain as Saloni: Srivastav's daughter (2015)
  - Ahsaas Channa as teenage Saloni (2015)
- Suman Shashi Kant as Srivastav: Chief Minister; Saloni's father (2015)
- Sarwar Ahuja as Advocate Palash Banerjee: Gangaa's boss while her internship (2016)
- Amardeep Garg as Karoli Baba (2016)
- Gaurav Khanna as Dr. Sameer Mirza: Rahat's husband; Zoya's father (2016) (Dead)
- Nausheen Ali Sardar as Rahat Mirza: Niranjan's first love; Zoya's mother; Sameer's wife (2016) (Dead)
- Rucha Gujarathi as Zoya Mirza: Rahat and Sameer's daughter; Niranjan's fake daughter (2016)
- Neha Pal as Prema (2016)
- Puja Kameshwar Sharma as Kashish: Gangaa's friend (2016–2017)
- Mohit Abrol/Deepak Wadhwa as Rudra: Sagar's friend (2016)
- Divyangana Jain as Ragini: Rudra's younger sister (2016)
- Kinjal Pandya as Yash's partner in crime (2016)
- Ahmad Harhash as Akash: Yash's friend (2016)

=== Special appearances ===
- Ratan Rajput as Santoshi
- Rytasha Rathore as Komal Shamsher Singh
- Prince Narula as Laakha "Lucky" Singh Ahlawat
- Antara Banerjee as Pinky
