= Patiala Babes =

Indian television series

- Genre: Drama
- Written by: Rajita Sharma; Rahul Sharma
- Directed by: Faheim Inamdar Yusuf Ansari
- Creative directors: Kunika Chaudhary; Niharika Singh
- Starring: See below
- Theme music composer: Devendra Bhome
- Opening theme: Devendra Bhome
- Country of origin: India
- Original language: Hindi
- No. of seasons: 2
- No. of episodes: 349

Production
- Producers: Rajita Sharma; Vivek Budakoti
- Running time: 20-22 minutes
- Production company: Katha Kottage Production LLP

Original release
- Network: Sony Entertainment Television
- Release: 27 November 2018 – 27 March 2020

Patiala Babes is an Indian Hindi-language drama television series directed by Faheim Inamdar Yusuf Ansari that premiered on 27 November 2018 on Sony Entertainment Television. Produced by Rajita Sharma and Vivek Budakoti under the banner of Katha Kottage. It abruptly ended on 27 March 2020 due to COVID-19.

== Seasons overview ==
Season	Episodes	Originally aired	
Season	Episodes	First aired	Last aired
1	256	27 November 2018	19 November 2019
2	93	20 November 2019	27 March 2020

== Plot ==
Babita, a shy, innocent woman, lives with her in-laws and her 17-year-old, fearless daughter, Mini. Babita's husband, Ashok Khurana returns to India after 17 years. He cheats on Babita with his business partner, Meeta. Heartbroken, Babita leaves the house with Mini, who helps her to divorce Ashok and become independent and self-reliant. Their landlord, Inspector Hanuman Singh motivates them.

Babita open a catering service, Patiala Babes, which becomes successful. Ashok misbehaves with pregnant Meeta and Mini and Babita stand by her. Soon, He repents for his actions and moves to London with Meeta. Hanuman falls for Babita and they get married. After wedding, Babita turns into a busy wife and ignores the catering service and Mini. Mini is shocked by her behavior and takes care of catering.

Babita burns Ashok's letter, which was sent to Mini and sells the catering service to an arrogant agent, Khatri, much to Mini's dismay. Mini decides to purse her dream to become a photographer and wins a scholarship for a cinematography course. She prepares to travel to Australia, shocking Babita and Hanuman. Mini moves abroad after which Babita realizes her mistake. She finds Mini's letter and misses her.

Mini returns to Manali for a project shoot. Delighted, Hanuman tries to meet her. The next day, Mini learns that both Babita and Hanuman have died due to an accident. After that, Mini returns to her home. She meets her half-sister, Arya, who informs the latter about Patiala Babes Restaurant, which was opened by Babita after Mini left. Naeem Bi tells Mini about Babita wish that Mini taking care of the restaurant. Then, Mini changes her decision of going back to Australia and takes the responsibility of restaurant. She hires a new chef, Neil Oberoi, who lives in Mini's house as a tenant.

Mini takes a legal action against Arya's school peon, Keval, who is a child abuser. Everybody supports her and Keval is punished. Eventually, Mini and Neil become closer. Mini learns that Neil is married and now wants to obtain a divorce. She meets his daughter, Kia and tries to leave Neil, remembering her own past. Neil tells Mini about how his wife Isha cheated on him with his friend, Ritwik. After that, Mini takes Neil's side and helps him to take a legal action against Isha.

== Cast ==
=== Main ===
- Ashnoor Kaur as Mini "Veer Balika" Babita (formerly Khurana) – Owner of Patiala Babes Restaurant; Babita and Ashok's daughter; Hanuman and Meeta's step-daughter; Arya's half-sister; Neil's love interest (2018–2020).
- Paridhi Sharma as Babita "Babes" Chadda Singh – Founder of Patiala Babes Restaurant; Pinku's sister; Ashok's ex-wife; Hanuman's second wife; Mini and Arya's mother (2018–2019) (Dead)
- Aniruddh Dave as Inspector Hanuman Singh – Imarti's widower; Babita's second husband; Arya's father; Mini's step-father (2018–2019) (Dead)
- Saisha Bajaj as Arya "Chutanki" Singh – Babita and Hanuman's daughter; Mini's half-sister (2019–2020)
- Saurabh Raj Jain as Neil Oberoi – Head chef at Patiala Babes Restaurant; Isha's ex-husband; Kia's father; Mini's love interest (2019–2020)

=== Recurring ===
- Rushita Vaidya as Preet Kaur – Rano's daughter; Bobby's sister; Mini's best friend; Mickey's fiancée (2018–2020)
- Bhawsheel Sahni as Bobby Singh – Rano's son; Preet's brother; Mini's one-sided lover (2018–2020)
- Mohit Hiranandani as Makhan "Mickey" Singh Ahluwalia – Mini's friend; Preet's fiancé (2018–2019)
- Sandhya Shungloo as Naeem Bi – Irfan's mother; Hanuman's mother-figure; Imran's grandmother; Mini and Arya's grandmother-figure (2019–2020)
- Anoop Puri as Kishenchand Khurana – Shami's husband; Ashok and Lovely's father; Babita's father-figure; Mini's grandfather; Arya's foster grandfather (2018–2020)
- Poonam Sirnaik as Shami Khurana – Kishenchand's wife; Ashok and Lovely's mother; Babita's mother-figure; Mini's grandmother; Arya's foster grandmother (2018–2020)
- Bhanujeet Sudan as Ashok Khurana – Kishenchand and Shami's son; Lovely's brother; Babita's ex-husband; Meeta's husband; Mini's father (2018–2019)
- Hunar Hali as Meeta Basu Khurana – Tapan and Sulekha's daughter; Ashok's business partner turned second wife; Mini's step-mother (2018–2019)
- Jazz Sodhi / Shyn Khurana as Lovely Khurana Chahal – Kishenchand and Shami's daughter; Ashok's sister; Sukhi's wife (2018–2019)
- Ashu Sharma as Sukhwinder "Sukhi" Chahal – Jatin's brother; Lovely's husband (2018–2019)
- Ushma Rathod as Geeta Kumari – Lalit's wife; Chef in Patiala Babes Restaurant (2019–2020)
- Romit Puri as Inspector Lalit "Laala" Mohan – Hanuman Singh's companion; Geeta's husband (2018–2020)
- Priya Rajput as Raani – Mini and Arya's maid (2019–2020)
- Jasleen Arora as Pooro – Arya's nanny (2019–2020)
- Harish Chhabra as Khursheed – Chef at Patiala Babes Restaurant (2019–2020)
- Deepika Khanna as Simpy – Chef at Patiala Babes Restaurant (2019–2020)
- Lipika Pradhan as Mrs. Lajo – Mini and Arya's school principal (2019–2020)
- Lavishka Gupta as Neha Malhotra – Vinita's daughter; Arya's best friend; Keval's victim (2020)
- Akanksha Gilani as Vinita Malhotra – Neha's mother (2020)
- Rajesh Chetri as Montu – Arya and Mini's neighbor; Arya's former nemesis and later friend (2019–2020)
- Kajal Khanchandani as Mrs. Sandhu – Mini and Arys's neighbour; Montu's grandmother (2019–2020)
- Swati Rajput as Jazz – Mini's friend in Australia (2019)
- Aparna Ghoshal as Sulekha Basu – Tapan's wife; Meeta's mother (2019)
- Unknown as Tapan Basu – Sulekha's husband; Meeta's father (2019)
- Roshni Sahota as Imarti Chautala Singh – Sardar's daughter; Hanuman's first wife (2019) (Dead)
- Karmveer Choudhary as Sardar Singh Chautala – Imarti's father (2019)
- Saurabh Sharma as Agent Khatri Seth – Babita and Mini's rival; Kammo's husband (2018–2020)
- Jaspreet Chhabra as Kammo Seth – Khatri's wife; Babita's former friend (2018–2020)
- Sandeep Kapoor as Kartaar Singh – Khatri's best friend (2018–2019)
- Subeer Kasali as Madhu Singh – Kartaar's wife (2018–2019)
- Bindia Kalra as Rano Kaur – Preet and Bobby's mother (2018–2019)
- Payas Pandit as Poonam – Babita's childhood friend; Rajeev's wife (2019)
- Anshumaan Singh as Pinku Chadda – Babita's brother; Saroj's husband; Sonu and Bahar's father (2018–2019)
- Harmanpreet Kaur as Saroj Chadda – Pinku's wife; Sonu and Bahar's mother (2018–2020)
- Fanish Kataria as Sonu Chadda – Pinku and Saroj's son; Bahar's brother; Mini and Arya's cousin (2018)
- Mahinder Shera as Gurmel Singh – Bobby and Preet's grandfather (2019)
- Mayank Mohan as Manmeet – Mini's rival in college (2019)
- Bharat Bhatia as Kittu Saluja – Kammo's nephew; Preet's ex-fiancé (2019)
- Gaurav Roopdas as Irfaan – Naeem Bi's son; Rukshana's husband; Imraan's father (2019)
- Menali Mundra as Rukshana – Irfaan's wife; Imraan's mother (2019)
- Ariyan Sawant as Imraan – Irfaan and Ruksana's son (2019)
- Kirti Sually as Satto Singh – Hanuman's aunt (2019)
- Amrita Prakash as Isha – Neil's ex-wife; Kia's mother (2020)
- Avyana Chhorwani as Kia Oberoi – Isha and Neil's daughter (2020)
- Akshay Arora as Milkman – Neil's friend who secretly loves Rani (2020)

== Production ==
=== Casting ===
On 24 October 2019, news came that leads Paridhi Sharma and Aniruddh Dave, were asked to leave the show overnight after the makers decided to bring Season 2 and leap the storyline by five years. Saurabh Raj Jain was cast as the lead Neil post leap in December 2019.

=== Cancellation ===
On 27 March 2020, owing COVID-19 pandemic, the series was temporarily halted as the shootings were stalled. However, in April 2020, on mutual agreement between the makers and channel, it was decided to terminate the series abruptly. Producer Rajita Sharma stated, "Ours was always a finite series, but unfortunately we are unable to shoot the remaining episodes because of the lockdown. None of us know when we will be in a position to resume shooting. So, it was a mutual decision to pull it off air."

== Awards ==
Year	Award	Category	Recipient	Result	Ref
2019	Indian Telly Awards	Best Drama Series (Jury)	Patiala Babes	Won	
2019	Indian Telly Awards	Next Generation Star	Ashnoor Kaur	Won	
