= Pinjara Khubsurti Ka =

Indian television drama series

- Genre: Romance; Drama
- Written by: Bhavna Vyas
- Story by: Srinita Bhoumick; Bhavna Vyas
- Directed by: Arshad Khan
- Starring: See below
- Theme music composer: Sangeet Patil
- Opening theme: Ae Pinjara
- Country of origin: India
- Original language: Hindi
- No. of seasons: 2
- No. of episodes: 250

Production
- Producer: Saurabh Tiwari
- Production location: Mumbai
- Cinematography: Shahbaaz Khan; Shahnoor Khan
- Editor: Jatish Narayan Ghadi
- Running time: 20-22 minutes
- Production company: Parin Multimedia

Original release
- Network: Colors TV
- Release: 24 August 2020 – 6 August 2021

Pinjara Khubsurti Ka (transl. Cage of Beauty) is an Indian Hindi-language television romantic drama series that aired from 24 August 2020 to 6 August 2021 on Colors TV for two seasons. Season 1 starred Riya Sharma and Sahil Uppal as Mayura Dubey and Omkar Shukla, while season 2 they played Mayura Goswami and Omkar Vashisht, respectively.

== Plot ==
Mayura Dubey, an aspiring doctor hates how people only like her beauty and not her skills or accomplishments. Omkar Shukla, the king of marble business industry wishes to marry her, and pressures her family to coerce her. They marry. Mayura befriends his brother Piyush. Later, Omkar scars her face with marble and kills Piyush. Mayura wants revenge. Omkar chooses Aishwarya over her. Aishwarya kidnaps Omkar and escapes. Mayura and Omkar are left hanging on from a tree by the cliff after she rescues Omkar from the car's trunk.

Omkar realizes Mayura's love for him and expresses his gratitude towards her. She falls off the cliff and is presumed dead. Distraught, Omkar realizes his mistakes, reforms and accepts his love for Mayura. She is alive but loses her memory.

Six months later, Omkar searches for Mayura and meets Dr. Neel who saved and loves her. Omkar finds Mayura, and her father Akhilesh begs Neel to marry her. Neel kidnaps Mayura and coerces her to marry his brother, Kundan. Omkar is revealed to be the groom and marries Mayura. Neel shoots him, but Omkar survives.

Mayura is pregnant and eventually delivers a girl named Tara. Omkar keeps her away from Mayura because Guru Maa tells him her scar is a bad omen for the baby. Omkar forces Mayura to have plastic surgery. She fakes her surgery, and Omkar kicks Mayura out and forbids her from seeing her daughter.

Five years later, Mayura has schizophrenia and celebrates Tara's 5th birthday while hallucinating about her and Omkar. Tara faints during the celebration. While Omkar tends to her needs, Tara sneaks out to play with the other kids. Mayura notices Tara helplessly standing in middle of road and rushes to save her. When Omkar unleashes his wrath upon the doctor, Tara is terrified and escapes. Mayura chases her and they are trapped inside a pipe tunnel while escaping heavy winds. Mayura soon learns that Tara is her daughter. Having been forced to stay away from her daughter for five years, Mayura resolves to get her daughter back.

Mayura disguises herself as a nurse for Tara's treatment and enters Omkar's house. When Mayura rescues Tara. Mayura bonds with Tara as Omkar investigates Mayura's identity.

Mayura plans to escape with Tara after finding her passport. In an attempt to take Tara away from Omkar, Mayura convinces her to go on a trip. When Mayura and Tara are caught by the police, Omkar refuses to lodge an FIR against her, but warns her to stay away from his daughter.

Omkar's mother learns that Mayura is not in the hospital and warns her son. When Omkar takes Tara to the hospital for a checkup, Mayura plots to kidnap her child. Omkar accuses Mayura of Tara's disappearance and plans to have her arrested. Mayura removes her disguise and leaves Omkar in utter shock. As Omkar takes Tara away, Mayura sits on a strike in front of his house. Later, Mayura reveals images of her marriage in front of the media, one of which is found by Tara.

With the start of a 14-day trial for custody, Tara reciprocates the emotional bond for her mother. Mayura wants Tara to enroll in school, but Omkar wants Tara to take online classes to protect her from the outside world and tries to scare her from enrolling. When Omkar and his goons invade Mayura's house, she stealthily escapes with Tara, but falls unconscious from an injury. After Mayura secures Tara, she seeks help from Vishakha, who advises her to work on herself and improve her lifestyle. Omkar visits Vishakha and asks her to reveal Mayura's address, but she refuses. Enraged by her refusal, Omkar threatens to burn down Vishakha's office. Omkar tries to warn Mayura but fails miserably. He pretends to be blind and tries to convince Mayura about Vishakha. The police find Vishakha's body, and despite all the clues pointing towards Omkar's involvement, Mayura defends him. Megha, Mayura's sister goes to the house disguised as a maid and plans to help Omkar to get paid. But Mayura suspects her and later finds out about Omkar's plans to recapture Tara. When Omkar is found with suspicious objects at the crime scene, he is arrested by the police. He escapes from the police station but is hit by the ACP's car. Mayura lashes out at Raghav when he tries to keep her away from Omkar, which infuriates him. Vishakha is revealed to be alive and conspiring with Raghav. When Omkar tries to fight back, Vishakha threatens him with his family being held hostage. Mayura and Omkar escape from captivity and flee, but Vishakha kills Omkar and Mayura with a sword.

20 years later, Mayura and Omkar are reincarnated as Mayura Goswami and Omkar Vashisht. After a rocky start, Omkar and Mayura meet again when the former works as a waiter in a hotel that belongs to Mayura's father. When Omkar begs Mayura for a second chance, she fires him. On a trip with her friends, Mayura takes Omkar with her as her bodyguard to teach him a lesson.

Mayura goes against her father's will and sneaks out of the house to participate in a fencing competition. She loses the sword-fighting competition against Omkar, and gets into a heated argument with her father and plans revenge against Omkar. Mayura bets with her friends to make Omkar fall in love with her and exact revenge on him. Later Vishakha comes backs into Omkar and Mayura's life. Mayura then remembers her past birth and tries to make Omkar remember. Vishakha plans that when Ishaan and Mayura marry she will send them to London and get her killed in a staged car accident. Omkar goes to Jabalpur and finds out about his past birth.

Bela gets Mayura ready for her haldi ceremony. Vishakha slips and falls, spilling the haldi and ruining the ceremony. Mayura is then taken to the mandap and pretends to faint. Omkar stops the wedding and Mayura is happy to see him. Vishakha reveals her plan and challenges Mayura to a sword fight with a talented fencer. Omkar saves Mayura and Vishkha holds everyone hostage, planning to burn Mayura and Omkar alive. The police arrests Vishakha for her crimes, and Mayura's father allows her and Omkar to marry.

== Cast ==
=== Main ===
- Riya Sharma as
  - Dr. Mayura Dubey Shukla: Surekha and Akhilesh's younger daughter; Megha's sister; Piyush's best friend; Omkar Shukla's wife; Tara's mother (Dead)
  - Mayura "Mayu" Goswami Vashisht – Reborn Mayura; Mahesh's daughter; Sachin's sister; Ishaan's childhood friend; Omkar Vashisht's wife
- Sahil Uppal as
  - Omkar "Omi" Shukla: Manjari and Shankar's elder son; Piyush's brother and murderer; Sanjay's cousin; Mayura Dubey's husband; Tara's faher (Dead)
  - Omkar Vashisht: Reborn Omkar; Madhulika's son; Naina's childhood friend; Mayura Vashisht's husband

=== Recurring ===
- Shruti Ulfat as Vishakha Rajvansh – Fashion tycoon and philanthropist; Ishaan's mother; Mayura Shukla and Omkar Shukla's rival and murderer
- Jaya Bhattacharya as Manjari Shukla – Shankar's wife; Omkar Shukla and Piyush's mother; Tara's grandmother
- Harish Chabbra as Shankar Shukla – Gauravi's brother; Manjari's husband; Omkar Shukla and Piyush's father; Tara's grandfather
- Gautam Vig as Piyush Shukla – Manjari and Shankar's younger son; Omkar Shukla's brother; Sanjay's cousin; Mayura's best friend (Dead)
- Saee Rewadikar / Druhi Pote as Tara Shukla – Mayura Shukla and Omkar Shukla's daughter
- Iqbal Azad as Akhilesh Dubey – Triveni's son; Surekha's husband; Megha and Mayura Shukla's father; Tara's grandfather
- Anindita Chatterjee as Surekha Dubey – Akhilesh's wife; Megha and Mayura Shukla's mother; Tara's grandmother
- Akanksha Pal as Megha Dubey Mishra – Surekha and Akhilesh's elder daughter; Mayura Shukla's sister; Sanjay's wife
- Sunny Sachdeva as Sanjay Mishra – Gauravi's son; Omkar and Piyush's cousin; Megha's husband
- Uma Basu as Triveni Dubey – Akhilesh's mother; Megha and Mayura Shukla's grandmother; Tara's great-grandmother
- Sanjay Swaraj as Mahesh Goswami – Sachin and Mayura Vashisht's father
- Ankush Bhaskar as Sachin Goswami – Mahesh's son; Mayura Vashisht's brother; Bela's husband
- Bhoomika Mirchandani as Bela Goswami – Sachin's wife
- Kajal Kanchandani as Nitanjali Kuryekar aka Dai Maa – Mayura Vashisht's caretaker
- Madhuri Sanjeev as Madhulika Vashisht – Omkar Vashisht's mother
- Komal Kunder as Naina Singhal – Omkar Vashisht's childhood friend
- Alan Kapoor as Ishaan Rajvansh – Vishaka's son; Mayura Vashisht's childhood friend
- Karan Vohra as ACP Raghav Shastri – Mayura Shukla's obsessed lover
- Nidhi Bhavsar as Aishwarya Bharadwaj – Manish's lover; Omkar Shukla's fake wife
- Anil Rajput as Manish Shekhari – Aishwarya's lover
- Asmita Sharma as Guruma Agrima Devi Shekhawat
- Abhishek Malik as Dr. Neel Upadhyay – Kundan's brother; Mayura Shukla's ex-fiancé
- Nitish Gupta as Kundan Upadhyay – Neel's brother; Megha's ex-fiancé

=== Special appearances ===
- Helly Shah as Riddhima Raisinghania
- Rrahul Sudhir as Vansh Raisinghania
- Vishal Vashishtha as Kabir Sharma

== Production ==
Shivangi Khedkar was originally cast as Mayura and was featured in a promo for the show, but due to creative differences, she quit the show and Riya Sharma was later cast to play Mayura.

The series switched time slots with Bawara Dil on 1 July 2021, moving to a later broadcast time. The change was made after the Broadcasting Content Complaints Council stated there was too much violent content in the show. Its last episode was telecasted on 6 August 2021 attributed to low ratings and was replaced by Balika Vadhu 2.
