= Vishal Vashishtha =

Indian actor (born 1992)

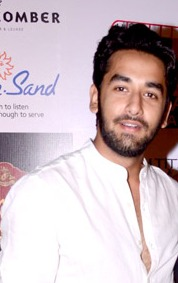
- Vishal in 2014
- Born: 3 February 1992 (age 34); Kolkata, West Bengal, India
- Education: The Heritage School, Kolkata
- Occupation: Actor
- Years active: 2013–present
- Known for: Ek Veer Ki Ardaas...Veera; Gangaa
- Spouse: Deepakshi Mishra (m. 2021)

Vishal Vashishtha (born 3 February 1992) is an Indian television actor. He has starred in various shows like Crazy Stupid Ishq, Ek Veer Ki Ardaas...Veera, Gangaa, Vish and Ishq Mein Marjawan 2.

== Life ==
Vishal Vashishtha was born on 3 February 1992 in Kolkata, India. While initially planning on a career as a Chartered Accountant, an interest in acting led him to audition for a career on the Small Screen. Besides English, he is also fluent in Hindi and Bengali. Vishal married his childhood sweetheart, Deepakshi Mishra.

== Career ==
Vishal's foray into Hindi television industry was with Sphere Origins's youth drama Crazy Stupid Ishq in 2013 broadcast on Channel V India as 'Ayaan Dixit' alongside Hiba Nawab, Harsh Rajput and Aneri Vajani. The same year, he appeared in an episode of MTV Webbed (Ep.11).

He later starred in Yash A Patnaik's Ek Veer Ki Ardaas...Veera on Star Plus(2013), portraying the character of 'Baldev Singh' opposite Digangana Suryavanshi. In 2015, he featured as 'Anil' in the fifth episode of Yeh Hai Aashiqui created by Vikas Gupta and broadcast by Bindass. In the final quarter of 2015, Vishal joined the cast of &TV's Television Drama Series Gangaa starring as 'Sagar Chaturvedi' opposite Aditi Sharma, for this performance he was nominated for Best Actor at Zee Gold Awards. He exited the series in January 2017.

Vishal's next project was rom-com Jaat Ki Jugni, broadcast on Sony Entertainment Television from April to July 2017 wherein he was paired opposite (Madirakshi Mundle). In January 2018, he was cast as the titular protagonist Shaurya Gupta (Kanhaiya) in Jai Kanhaiya Lal Ki on Star Bharat. Vishal next signed on to star in the finite series Vish: A Poisonous Story (May 2019) on Colors TV. The show co-starred Debina Bonnerjee, Krip Suri and Sana Makbul.

Reuniting with Patnaik, he essayed the lead antagonist role in the romantic thriller Ishq Mein Marjawan 2 on Colors TV as 'Kabir Sharma' 2020 to March 2021. In March 2021, the show ended on TV and shifted to the digital platform Voot by airing a new season named Ishq Mein Marjawan 2: Naya Safar with him reprising his role of Kabir Sharma.

In July 2021, Vishal joined the lead cast of Dice Media's Clutch – India's first Esport Web-Series. The first episode streamed on 2 October 2021 and the finale episode streamed on 4 November 2021. The series was received with a good reception on YouTube and got a year end special mention for one of the highest viewed YouTube India web series of 2021.

He started 2022 with the shoot of his new webseries tentatively titled 'Ghar Waapsi' produced by Dice Media. In April and May 2022 a string of his YouTube videos were uploaded by FilterCopy and Pocket Change. His OTT debut 'Ghar Waapsi' premiered on Disney+ Hotstar on 22 July 2022.

== Filmography ==
=== Television ===
Year	Title	Role	Notes
2013	Crazy Stupid Ishq	Ayaan Dixit	Lead Role
2013	MTV Webbed	Daksh	Episode 11
2013–2015	Ek Veer Ki Ardaas...Veera	Baldev Balwant Singh	Lead Role
2015	Yeh Hai Aashiqui – Sun Yaar Try Maar	Anil	Episode 5: "Courtroom Romance"
2015–2017	Gangaa	Sagar Niranjan Chaturvedi	Lead Role
2017	Jaat Ki Jugni	Bittu Daljeet Singh Dahiya	Lead Role
2018	Jai Kanhaiya Lal Ki	Shaurya "Kanhaiya" Ramnik Gupta	Lead Role
2019	Vish	Aditya Vir Kothari	Lead Role
2020–2021	Ishq Mein Marjawan 2	Kabir Sharma	Negative Lead

=== Film ===
Year	Title	Role
2025	The Diplomat	Ayush
2025	Sikandar	Rangachari
2026	Pati Patni Aur Woh Do	Sudhanshu "Sunny" Tiwari

=== Web series ===
Year	Title	Role	Notes	Broadcast By
2021	Ishq Mein Marjawan 2: Naya Safar	Kabir Sharma	Negative Lead	Voot
2021	Clutch	Arun Wankhede	Lead role	Dice Media
2022	Ghar Waapsi	Shekhar Dwivedi	Lead role	Disney+ Hotstar
2024	Showtime	Prithvi	Supporting role	Disney+ Hotstar
2024	Hustlers			Amazon Miniseries
2026	Glory	Inspector		Netflix
2026	Ali Baba aur 40 Bhoot	Babarao Upadhaya / Baba	Lead Role	Disney+ Hotstar

=== Music video ===
Year	Title	Role	Label
2019	Uske Bina	Himself	Zee Music

=== Short films ===
Year	Title	Role	Level
2019	Name Plate	Pratyaksh sharma	Blush

=== YouTube videos ===
Year	Title	Role	channel
2019	When you date a Bengali guy	Himself	Filtercopy
2019	Is it necessary to get married	Himself	Filtercopy
2019	Things you shouldn't say to your partner	Himself	Filtercopy
2020	Jon snow ki shaadi ka rishta	Himself	Filtercopy
2020	Shaadi aaj kaal : a wedding story	Himself	Filtercopy
2020	When you love buying things online	Himself	Filtercopy
2021	Shaadi at 4 am	Jai	Filtercopy
2021	3 Stages Of Long Distance Relationship	Sameer	The Zoom Studio
2022	Money Conversations Between Couples	Himself	Filtercopy
2022	Our Happy Place: When You Move To A New City	Uday	Filtercopy
2022	When You Plan A Housewarming With Your Partner	Uday	Filtercopy
2022	How To Survive Traffic	Kabir	Pocket Change

== Awards and nominations ==
Year	Award	Category	Nominated work	Result	Ref.
2014	Zee Gold Awards	Best Actor in A Comic Role (Male)	Ek Veer Ki Ardaas...Veera	Won	
2014	Indian Television Academy Awards	Best Actor Comedy	Ek Veer Ki Ardaas...Veera	Nominated	
2014	Indian Telly Awards	Best Fresh New Face Male	Ek Veer Ki Ardaas...Veera	Nominated	
2014	Indian Telly Awards	Best Tellywood jodi with Digangana Suryavanshi	Ek Veer Ki Ardaas...Veera	Nominated	
2014	Star Parivaar Awards	Favourite Jodi	Ek Veer Ki Ardaas...Veera	Nominated	
2014	Star Parivaar Awards	Most Stylish Sadasya – Male	Ek Veer Ki Ardaas...Veera	Nominated	
2014	Star Parivaar Awards	Sabse Mazedaar Sadasya	Ek Veer Ki Ardaas...Veera	Nominated	
2014	Star Parivaar Awards	Best Naya Sadasya – Male	Ek Veer Ki Ardaas...Veera	Nominated	
2016	ZEE Gold Awards	Best Actor	Gangaa	Nominated	
2017	Indian Television Academy Awards	Best Actor Popular	Jaat Ki Jugni	Nominated	
2018	ZEE Gold Awards	Best Actor	Jaat Ki Jugni	Nominated	
