= Sirf Tum (TV series) =

Indian television series

- Genre: Romantic drama
- Created by: Rashmi Sharma
- Written by: Sharad Tripathi
- Screenplay by: Tanya Sinha
- Story by: Abhijeet Sinha
- Directed by: Pankaj Kumar
- Creative director: Roma Gadwal
- Starring: See below
- Opening theme: Sirf Tum
- Composer: Rahul Jain
- Country of origin: India
- Original language: Hindi
- No. of seasons: 1
- No. of episodes: 232

Production
- Producers: Rashmi Sharma (2021–2022); Sanjeev Kumar (2022)
- Cinematography: Sachin Mishra
- Editors: Adya Yadav; Vishal Singh
- Camera setup: Multi camera
- Running time: 22 min approx.
- Production companies: Rashmi Sharma Telefilms (2021–2022); Cryptic Code Entertainment (2022)

Original release
- Network: Colors TV (2021–2022); Voot (2022)
- Release: 15 November 2021 – 16 September 2022

Sirf Tum (transl. Only You) is an Indian Hindi-language romantic television drama series created by Rashmi Sharma, and starring Vivian Dsena and Eisha Singh. It was broadcast on Colors TV and Voot from 15 November 2021 to 16 September 2022. It contained 232 episodes.

== Plot ==
Vikrant Oberoi is a wealthy and arrogant businessman. He marries Mamta after disowning his first wife Asha, and their new-born son Ansh. Asha moves on with Ansh, and swears to destroy the Oberoi family by raising Ansh to take revenge on the Oberois, especially Mamta and Vikrant's son, Ranveer, who got everything that Ansh lost.

=== 25 years later ===
Angry and strong-minded, Ranveer has grown up to hate his father, after he discovered in his childhood that Vikrant cheated on Mamta with another woman. Suhaani Sharma is an aspiring doctor, whose father is Vikrant's manager Rakesh Sharma. Ranveer and Ansh study in the same college. Ranveer has always been unaware that Ansh is his half-brother, whereas Ansh knows the truth and detests him. Suhaani signs up for the same college. Rakesh asks Ranveer to look after her, to which he agrees. They become friends, but Ranveer falls in love with Suhaani. Ansh intends to separate them but his plans go in vain. Ranveer and Suhaani confess their love. Rakesh is hesitant to give a nod to their relationship, when Vikrant secretly insults him due to differences in their family status, but later agrees seeing their love. Suhaani and Ranveer get engaged. A furious Ansh reveals to Ranveer that he is his half-brother, and attacks him, leaving him unconscious. Ansh photographs him, and shows the photos to Rakesh, saying that Ranveer is drunk and will not come to the wedding. Out of embarrassment, Rakesh is forced to marry Suhaani to Ansh, as Ranveer arrives too late to stop the ceremony.

Upon his arrival, Ranveer thrashes Ansh and sets fire to the venue. Later, Ansh reveals to Suhaani that he married her just to hurt Ranveer, leading the two to separate. Ranveer and Suhaani finally get married. Vikrant divorces Mamta and reconciles with Asha, accepting Ansh as his heir. Ansh also marries a girl Honey, who has returned from a mental asylum. During a fight, Honey tries to kill Ranveer, but Ansh is shot and dies. Asha apologizes to Mamta, realizes her mistakes, and leaves Vikrant's house. Ranveer insults Suhaani, who leaves him and moves to another city with her family members. After manipulating Ranveer against Suhaani, Honey abducts and tries to kill her, lying of doing so on Ranveer's orders, which causes Suhaani to hate Ranveer. Ultimately, Aditya (a college student) saves Suhaani from Honey, and offers her and the Sharmas a place to stay. Vikrant realizes his misdeeds and seeks forgiveness from Mamta.

=== 1 year later ===
Suhaani and her family live with Aditya, before Suhaani returns to her house and goes back to college. While there, she reunites with Ranveer. Aditya starts falling for Suhaani. Ranveer and Suhaani get kidnapped, and Aditya finds them and rescues them. Aditya blames Ranveer for the incident, saying because of him, Suhaani got abducted. Aditya puts Suhaani on his lap, Ranveer hits him and says that Suhaani is his wife, and arguments start between them. Because of this incident, Ranveer breaks his relationship with Suhaani.

=== 1 year later ===
Ranveer is working in a hospital, treating a criminal patient who is seriously injured. When the police come to arrest the patient, Ranveer stops them, and Suhaani arrives to bail out the patient. Surprised by the generosity, Ranveer again falls in love with Suhaani, and the two remarry.

== Cast ==
=== Main ===
- Vivian Dsena as Ranveer Oberoi: Mamta and Vikrant's son; Ansh's half-brother; Suhaani's husband (2021–2022)
- Eisha Singh as Suhaani Sharma Oberoi: Rakesh and Sudha's daughter; Ishaan's sister; Ansh's ex-wife; Ranveer's wife (2021–2022)

=== Recurring ===
- Shalini Kapoor Sagar as Mamta Oberoi: Vikrant's second wife; Ranveer's mother (2021–2022)
- Nimai Bali as Vikrant Oberoi: Devendra's elder son; Vikram's brother; Asha and Mamta's husband; Ansh and Ranveer's father (2021–2022)
- Sanjay Batra as Rakesh Sharma: Aarti's son; Kamini's brother; Vikrant's former employee; Sudha's husband; Suhaani and Ishaan's father (2021–2022)
- Eva Ahuja as Sudha Sharma: Rakesh's wife; Suhaani and Ishaan's mother (2021–2022)
- Anil Dhawan as Devendra Oberoi: Vikrant and Vikram's father; Ansh, Ranveer and Samaira's grandfather (2021–2022)
- Puneett Chouksey as Ansh Oberoi: Asha and Vikrant's son; Ranveer's half-brother; Suhaani's ex-husband; Honey's husband (2021–2022) (Dead)
- Kajal Pisal as Asha Oberoi: Vikrant's first wife; Ansh's mother (2021–2022)
- Sonyaa Ayodhya as Riya Kapoor: Shashi's daughter; Ranveer's obsessive lover (2021–2022)
- Jasjeet Babbar as Aarti Sharma: Rakesh and Kamini's mother; Suhaani, Nikita and Ishaan's grandmother (2021–2022)
- Amit Dhawan/Mani Rai as Vikram Oberoi: Devendra's younger son; Vikrant's brother; Roshni's husband; Samaira's father (2021–2022)
- Bindiya Kalra as Roshni Oberoi: Vikram's wife; Samaira's mother (2021–2022)
- Tanu Vidyarthi as Kamini Sharma: Aarti's daughter; Rakesh's sister; Nikita's mother (2021–2022)
- Aakash Rohira as Raghav "Raghu" Tripathi: Ranveer's friend (2021–2022)
- Sapan Gulati as John Wults: Ranveer's friend (2021–2022)
- Agam Dixit as Ishaan Sharma: Rakesh and Sudha's son; Suhaani's brother (2021–2022)
- Vaidehi Nair as Samaira Oberoi: Vikram and Roshni's daughter (2021–2022)
- Shalu Chauhan/Dolly Kaushik as Nikita Chopra: Kamini's daughter (2021–2022)
- Rishika Bali as Meeta Basu: Suhaani's friend (2021–2022)
- Amit Rai as Rishi Singhania: Ansh's friend (2021–2022)
- Akshay Patil as Rocky Kundra: Ansh's friend (2021–2022)
- Kamal Malik as Shashi Kapoor: Vikrant and Vikram's business partner; Riya's father (2021–2022)
- Nikki Sharma as Honey Oberoi: Ansh's wife (2022)
- Raghav Tiwari as Dr. Aditya Birla (2022)
- Sharik Khan as Karan Arora (2021–2022)

=== Special appearances ===
- Bharti Singh as the host of the New Year Celebration (2021)
- Haarsh Limbachiyaa as the host of the New Year Celebration (2021)
- Tanya Sharma as Reema Vivaan Oswal from Sasural Simar Ka 2 (2021)
- Karan Sharma as Vivaan Oswal from Sasural Simar Ka 2 (2021)
- Radhika Muthukumar as Simar Aarav Oswal from Sasural Simar Ka 2 (2021)
- Avinash Mukherjee as Aarav Oswal from Sasural Simar Ka 2 (2021)
- Sumit Bhardwaj as Samar Khanna from Sasural Simar Ka 2 (2021)
- Akash Jagga as Gagan Narayan from Sasural Simar Ka 2 (2021)
- Shubhanshi Singh Raghuvanshi as Aditi Oswal from Sasural Simar Ka 2 (2021)
- Nikki Tamboli for New Year Celebration (2021)
- Priyal Mahajan as Purvi Virendra Pratap Singh from Molkki (2021)
- Amar Upadhyay as Virendra Pratap Singh from Molkki (2021)
- Shivangi Joshi as Anandi Bhujaariya Anjaariya from Balika Vadhu 2 (2021)
- Samridh Bawa as Jigar Anjaariya from Balika Vadhu 2 (2021)
- Jigyasa Singh as Vaani "Thapki" Tripathi Singhania from Thapki Pyar Ki 2 (2021)
- Aakash Ahuja as Purab Singhania from Thapki Pyar Ki 2 (2021)
- Rachana Mistry as Hansika Agrawal from Thapki Pyar Ki 2 (2021)
- Karan Suchak as Dr. Anurag Basu from Thoda Sa Baadal Thoda Sa Paani (2021)
- Ishita Dutta as Kajol Mukherjee from Thoda Sa Baadal Thoda Sa Paani (2021)
- Surabhi Das as Nima Denzongpa from Nima Denzongpa (2021)
- Akshay Kelkar as Suresh Mane from Nima Denzongpa (2021)
- Usha Naik as Sunita Mane from Nima Denzongpa (2021)
- Sushmita Singh as Siya Mane from Nima Denzongpa (2021)
- Sonakshi Batra as Manya Mane from Nima Denzongpa (2021)
- Sukanya Baruah as Naari Mane from Nima Denzongpa (2021)
- Sharmila Shinde as Tulika Mane from Nima Denzongpa (2021)
- Jayati Bhatia as Geetanjali Devi from Sasural Simar Ka 2 (2022)
- Shakti Singh as Professor Avinash Narayan from Sasural Simar Ka 2 (2022)
- Anita Kulkarni as Indu Narayan from Sasural Simar Ka 2 (2022)
- Aarav Chowdhary as Gajendra Oswal from Sasural Simar Ka 2 (2022)
- Shital Thakkar as Sandhya Oswal from Sasural Simar Ka 2 (2022)
- Shubhanshi Singh Raghuvanshi as Aditi Gagan Narayan from Sasural Simar Ka 2 (2022)

== Soundtrack ==
Sirf Tum Original Sound Track

Soundtrack album by Rahul Jain
- Released: 12 November 2021
- Genre: Romance; Soundtrack
- Length: 10:14
- Language: Hindi; Urdu
- Producer: Rashmi Sharma

Sirf Tum's soundtrack is written by Amit D, and composed by Rahul Jain.

Sirf Tum: Tracklisting
No.	Title	Lyrics	Music	Singer(s)	Length
1.	"Sirf Tum" (Title Song)	Amit D	Rahul Jain	Rahul Jain	05:12
2.	"Sirf Tum" (Sad Version)	Amit D	Rahul Jain	Rahul Jain	05:02

== Reception ==
A review of the first episodes in the Times of India stated that the series "ha[d] the potential to fare better if it [did] away with typical dialogues and mentality of some of its characters".

The series was described as follows by Madhushree Chakrabarty of Media Infoline: "Set in the beautiful locales of Dehradun, against the backdrop of a medical college, Sirf Tum highlights the nuances of a complicated relationship between two people."
