= Nyrraa M Banerji =

Indian actress and model

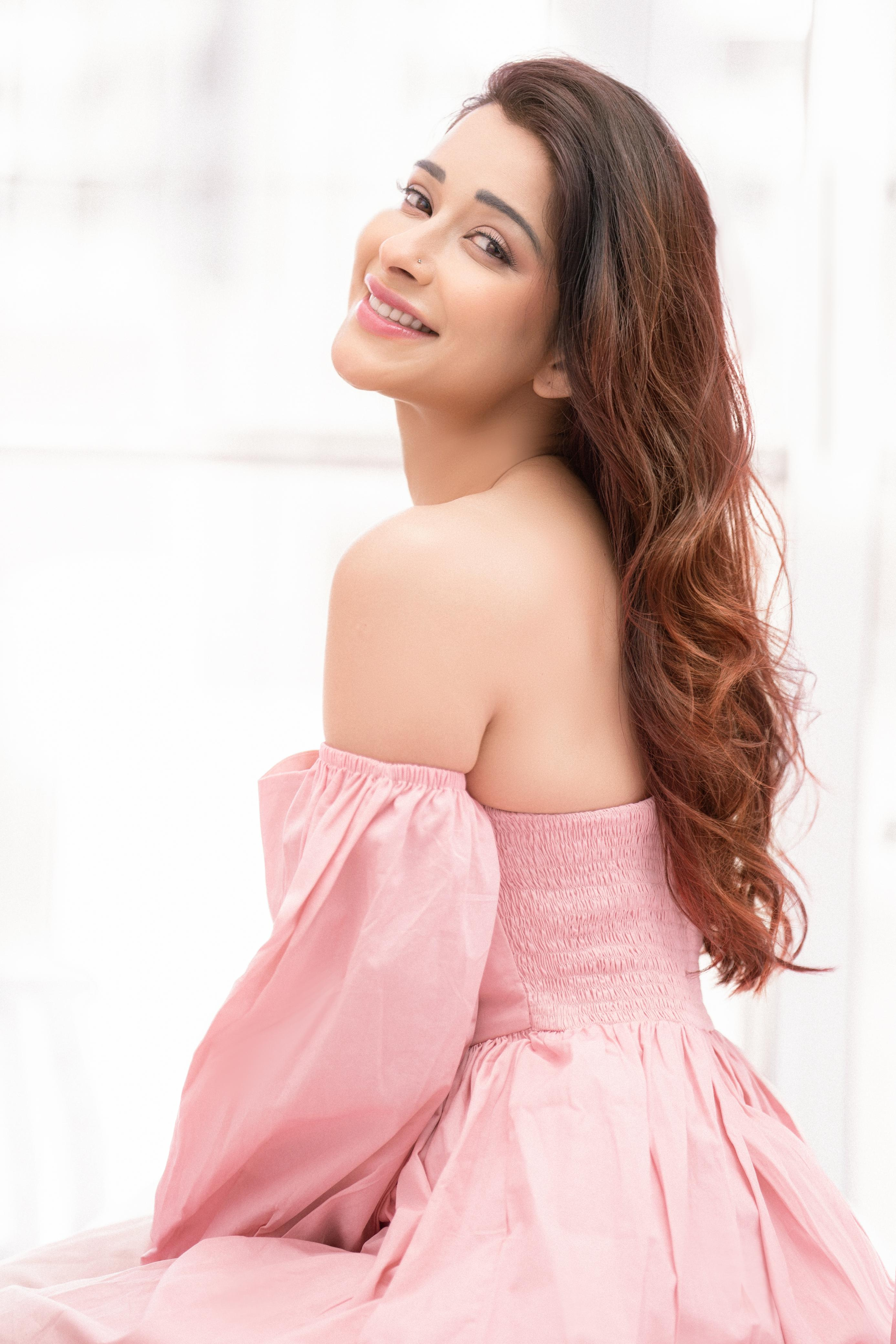
- Banerji in 2025
- Born: Madhuurima Banerjee; 14 May 1987 (age 39); Mumbai, Maharashtra, India
- Occupations: Actress; Model
- Years active: 2009–present

Madhuurima Banerjee professionally known as Nyra Banerji, is an Indian actress and model who appears in Hindi, Telugu, Tamil, Malayalam, and Kannada language productions. She is widely recognized for her lead roles in series such as Divya Drishti and Pishachini. Banerji has been a prominent participant in major reality shows, including Khatron Ke Khiladi 13 and Bigg Boss 18.

In 2026, she starred in the pan-India comedy film One Two Cha Cha Chaa alongside Ashutosh Rana. She also gained praise for her performance in Neeraj Pandey's Netflix series Khakee: The Bengal Chapter (2025–2026). Banerji's film career includes her Bollywood debut in Kamaal Dhamaal Malamaal (2012) and One Night Stand (2016). Beyond acting, she served as an assistant director for the film Azhar (2016).

== Early life ==
Nyrraa M Banerji was born in Mumbai. Banerji learned Hindustani classical music and ghazal from her mother and used to sing children's songs. She also learned the classical dancing form Kathak but had to discontinue due to her father's transferable job. While recording a song one day, she was spotted by noted director G. V. Iyer who signed her on for the Hindi television serial Kadambari. She was supposed to play Sita's role in a film adaptation of Ramayana that G. V. Iyer was planning to shoot, but the director died and the project failed to materialise.

== Career ==
Banerji made her acting debut with the Telugu-language film Aa Okkadu in 2009.

Banerji was seen in the Telugu films Sardaga Kasepu and Orange, directed by Bhaskar, which was followed by her Kannada releases, Savaari 2 and Tiger. In Savaari 2, she played the role of a bank manager. Her Malayalam releases included Koothara alongside Mohanlal. In Koothara she played the role of Shaista, an NRI. She then starred in Maruthi's Kotha Janta also starring Allu Sirish.

In early 2015, she was seen in Puri Jagannadh's Temper, for which she was critically acclaimed. She then appeared in one Tamil film, Sundar C's Aambala.

In 2016, Banerji adopted her pet name, Nyra, as her stage name, replacing her birth name, Madhuurima, with the former. This was to avoid the ongoing confusion between her and actress Madhurima Tuli. She also assisted director Tony D'Souza for his film Azhar.

In 2019, she played one of titular character Divya Sharma Shergill in Star Plus's Divya Drishti opposite Mishkat Varma and alongside Sana Sayyad and Adhvik Mahajan.

In 2022, she starred as titular role in Colors TV's Pishachini. In 2023 she particinated in Fear Factor: Khatron Ke Khiladi 13 on the same channel and finished at seventh position. In 2024 she participated in Indian reality show Bigg Boss 18 finished at 20th place.

In 2025, she was also seen in Netflix series Khakhee - The Bengal Chapter, a Neeraj Pandey series, playing a very prominent role.

== Filmography ==
=== Films ===
Year	Title	Role	Language	Notes
2009	Aa Okkadu	Dr. Pavithra	Telugu	
2009	Toss	Sherry	Hindi	
2010	Saradaga Kasepu	Manimala	Telugu	
2010	Orange	Madhu	Telugu	Special appearance
2012	Kamaal Dhamaal Malamaal	Maria	Hindi	
2014	Kotha Janta	Pentamma	Telugu	
2014	Savaari 2		Kannada	
2014	Koothara	Sheistha	Malayalam	
2015	Temper	Lakshmi	Telugu	
2015	Aambala	Nadu Ponnu's daughter	Tamil	
2015	Dohchay	Item number	Telugu	Special appearance
2015	Supari Surya		Kannada	
2015	Ishq Ne Krazy Kiya Re	Ritu	Hindi	
2016	One Night Stand	Simran	Hindi	
2016	Azhar	—	Hindi	Assistant director
2017	Tiger	Gowri	Kannada	
2021	Barun Rai and the House on the Cliff	Soumili	English	
2026	One Two Cha Cha Chaa	Shoma	Hindi	

=== Television ===
Year	Title	Role	Notes	Ref.
2007	Ssshhhh... Phir Koi Hai	Shalini	(Episode 17 - Khooni Billi)	
2019	Skyfire			
2019	Operation Cobra	Tahira Shaikh		
2019–2020	Divya Drishti	Divya Sharma Shergill		
2020	Excuse Me Maadam	Mithu Madam		
2021–2022	Rakshabandhan... Rasal Apne Bhai Ki Dhal	Chakori Moong Singh		
2022–2023	Pishachini	Rani/Pishachini		
2023	Fear Factor: Khatron Ke Khiladi 13	Contestant	7th place	
2023	Fuh Se Fantasy 2	Kamnya	Episode 1	
2024	Bigg Boss 18	Contestant	20th place	
2024	Checkmate	Neelam	Hungama Play	
2025	Khakee: The Bengal Chapter	Rekha Sinha	Netflix series	
2026	Dil Padosi: Love Next Door	Dia Krishna Ranawat	Shemaroo me series	

=== Music videos ===
Year	Title	Singer	Ref.
2022	Jaana Hai Toh Jaa	Mohammed Irfan	
2022	Heartthrob	Veer Sahu	
2022	Aur Kitna Rulayegi Tu	Varun Jain	
2022	Aashiqon Ki Mehfil	Stebin Ben, Payal Dev	
2022	Naughty Balam	Rahul Vaidya	
2023	Baarish	Javed Ali, Arpita Mukherjee	
2025	Main Teri Hoon	Ahaan	
2025	Intezaar	Keshav Anand	
2025	SLT (Stay Like This)	Harssh Dada	
2025	Patience	Pranay Pawar	
