= Pooja Singh (actress) =

Indian actress

- Occupations: Actress, athlete
- Years active: 2011–2025
- Spouse: Kapil Chattani (m. 2017; div. 2021) Karan Sharma (m. 2024)

Pooja Singh is an Indian television actress best known for her portrayal of Emily Rathi in Diya Aur Baati Hum which rank among the Indian longest running television shows.

== Personal life ==
She was earlier married to her Canada based boyfriend Kapil Chattani from 2017 to 2021. She is dating actor Karan Sharma of Sasural Simar Ka 2 fame and going to tie the knot with him on 30 March 2024.

== Television ==
Year	Title	Role
2011	Comedy Circus Ka Naya Daur	Contestant
2012	Aasman Se Aage	Poonam Sharma
2012	Savdhaan India	Miloni Gaekwad
2013	Aaj Ki Housewife Hai... Sab Jaanti Hai	Julie Chaturvedi
2013–2016	Diya Aur Baati Hum	Emily D'Souza Rathi
2014–2015	Friends: Conditions Apply	Isha Chawla
2017	Dil Se Dil Tak	Forum Bhanushali
2017	Crime Patrol	Sangita Das
2018	Saat Phero Ki Hera Pherie	Lajmeen "Laajo" Singh
2018–2021	Shakti Astitva Ke Ehsaas Ki	Raavi Singh
2020–2021	Aye Mere Humsafar	Divya Kothari
2022	Banni Chow Home Delivery	Alpana
2023	Tere Ishq Mein Ghayal	Malini
2023	Swaraj	Durga Bhabhi
2025	Pocket Mein Aasman	Pinky
