= Sana Sayyad =

Indian television actress

- Occupations: Actress; Model
- Years active: 2015–present
- Known for: Divya Drishti; Spy Bahu; Kundali Bhagya
- Spouse: Imaad Shamsi (m. 2021)
- Children: 1

Sana Sayyad is an Indian actress who primarily works in Hindi television. Sayyad is best known for her portrayal of Drishti Sharma in Divya Drishti, Sejal Kotadia in Spy Bahu and Dr. Palki Khurana in Kundali Bhagya.

== Early life ==
Sayyad's father, Yaquib Sayyad, works in the Merchant Navy.

== Personal life ==
Sayyad revealed in February 2021, that she was dating entrepreneur Imaad Shamsi, and the two married on 25 June 2021 in a Nikaah ceremony.

The couple had their first child, a daughter, on 9 October 2024.

== Career ==
=== Debut and early work (2015–2019) ===
Sayyad started her career in 2015 by participating in MTV Splitsvilla 8, where she finished as the runner-up with Utkarsh Gupta. In 2015, she made her acting debut with Boyz Will Be Boyz, portraying Ashita opposite Ashwini Koul. She then portrayed Avanti in Yeh Hai Aashiqui Sun Yaar Try Maar opposite Shehzad Shaikh, the same year.

In 2016, she appeared in Star Plus's soap opera Jaana Na Dil Se Door portrayed as Aditi Vashisht and same year she played as Megha in romantic television series MTV Girls on Top.

Later, she was seen as Manisha in an episode role in Sony Entertainment Television India's Indian true crime anthology series Crime Patrol . In 2018, she portrayed Amrit Kakkar Chopra in Papa By Chance opposite Zebby Singh.

=== Breakthrough and recognition (2019–2022) ===
From 2019 to 2020, Sayyad portrayed one of the titular character Drishti Sharma Shergill in Star Plus's popular supernatural drama and romantic television serial Divya Drishti, opposite Adhvik Mahajan and alongside Nyra Banerjee and Mishkat Varma. It proved as a major turning point in her career.

In 2020 to 2021 post COVID-19 pandemic lockdown, she portrayed Sonam Goel Jaiswal in Star Plus's Lockdown Ki Love Story opposite Mohit Malik.

In 2022, Sayyad portrayed Sejal Kotadia Nanda / Mahira Mirza, a Research and Analysis Wing agent, in Spy Bahu opposite Sehban Azim. For her role as Sejal, Sana nominated for Indian Television Academy Awards and Gold Awards as Best Actress in a Leading Role 2022.

=== Further work (2023–present) ===
In March 2023, she portrayed Dr. Palki Khurana opposite Baseer Ali and Paras Kalnawat after the generation leap in Zee TV's romantic drama Kundali Bhagya. However she quit the series in May 2024 due to her pregnancy and was replaced by Adrija Roy.

== Filmography ==
=== Television ===
Year	Title	Role	Notes	Ref.
2015	MTV Splitsvilla 8	Contestant		
2015	Boys Will Be Boyz	Ashita		
2015	Yeh Hai Aashiqui	Avanti		
2016–2017	Jaana Na Dil Se Door	Aditi Vashisht		
2016–2017	MTV Girls on Top	Megha		
2017	Crime Patrol	Manisha		
2018	Papa By Chance	Amrit Chopra		
2019–2020	Divya Drishti	Drishti Sharma		
2020–2021	Lockdown Ki Love Story	Sonam Goel		
2022	Spy Bahu	Sejal Kotadia		
2023–2024	Kundali Bhagya	Dr. Palki Khurana		
2024	Kumkum Bhagya	Dr. Palki Khurana		

=== Short films ===
Year	Title	Role
2023	Couple Goals	
2023	Signs We Made For Each Other	
2023	Reasons Why I Love Him	
2023	Ways I Say I Love You	
2023	My Professional Housewife	

=== Web series ===
Year	Title	Role	Notes	Ref.
2022	Hasratein	Aarti	Episode 4: "Shaadi Mubarak"	

== Awards and nominations ==
Year	Award	Category	Work	Result	Ref.
2022	Indian Television Academy Awards	Popular Actress (Drama)	Spy Bahu	Nominated	
2023	Gold Awards	Best Actress in a Leading Role	Spy Bahu	Nominated	

== See also ==
- List of Indian television actresses
- List of Hindi television actresses
