= Kajal Pisal =

Indian television actress

- Born: Mumbai, India
- Occupation: Actress
- Years active: 2007–present
- Notable work: Saath Nibhaana Saathiya; Bade Achhe Lagte Hain
- Spouse: Abhijit Pisal (m. 2003)
- Children: Sara Pisal

Kajal Pisal is an Indian television actress who works in Hindi shows.

== Career ==
=== 2007–2014 ===
Pisal began her television acting career in 2007 when Ekta Kapoor gave her a minor part in Kuchh Is Tara, and next played episodic roles in Savdhaan India, CID and Adaalat. In 2011, she bagged the role of Ishika in Kapoor's successful daily soap Bade Achhe Lagte Hain. It was her first big breakthrough, followed by portraying Riya Malik in Ek Hazaaron Mein Meri Behna Hai opposite Karan Suchak. She also appeared as Maya in Ek Mutthi Aasmaan.

=== 2015–present ===
In 2015, Pisal got further recognition by portraying the negative role of Manasi Raheja in Rashmi Sharma's longest-running television series Saath Nibhaana Saathiya. She next replaced Kishwer Merchant Rai as Neeta Malhotra in Sharma's medical romantic drama Savitri Devi College & Hospital in 2017. In 2018, she had a brief role in Udaan as Kanchan Bedi.

In 2020, Pisal bagged a cameo as Adhira Mathur in Kapoor's supernatural thriller Naagin 5 and starred as Ketki Aneja in Durga – Mata Ki Chhaya. In November 2021, she was cast as Asha Oberoi in Sharma's romantic drama series Sirf Tum.

== Television ==
Year	Serial	Role	Notes
2007	Kuchh Is Tara	Unknown	
2010	C.I.D	Megha Gupta	
2011–2014	Bade Achhe Lagte Hain	Ishika Kapoor	
2012	Savdhaan India	Smriti Roy	
2013	Ek Hazaaron Mein Meri Behna Hai	Riya Malik	
2013	Adaalat	Anjali Rane	
2013–2014	Ek Mutthi Aasmaan	Maya Bhandari	
2015; 2016	Saath Nibhaana Saathiya	Manasi Raheja	
2017–2018	Savitri Devi College & Hospital	Neeta Sachdev Malhotra	
2018	Udaan	Kanchan Bedi	
2020	Naagin 5	Adhira Mathur	
2020–2021	Durga – Mata Ki Chhaya	Ketki Aneja	
2021–2022	Sirf Tum	Asha Saxena Oberoi	
2023	Sasural Simar Ka 2	Charulata	
2023–2025	Jhanak	Tanuja Bose	
2026	Lakshmi Niwas	Nalini Gajendra Chauhan	
