= Amika Shail =

Indian film and television actor

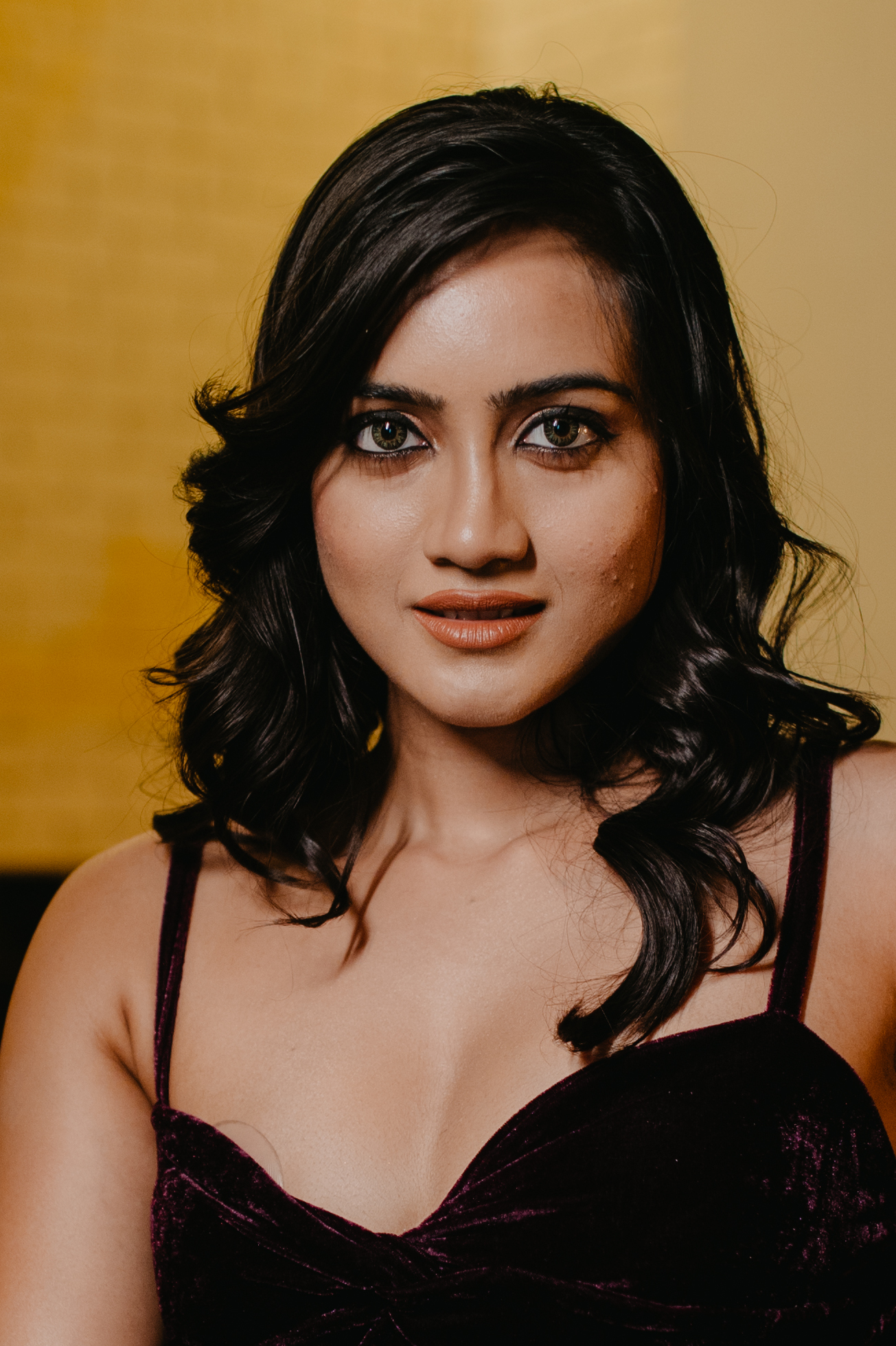
- Born: Gitashree Shil; 12 November; Uttarpara, Hooghly, West Bengal, India
- Occupations: Singer, Actor, Model

Amika Shail (pronounced [a-mee-kaa]; born 12 November) is an Indian singer turned actress. She is known for her works in Hindi-language cinema, web series, web films, and television. She portrayed the character of Vayu Pari in Balveer Returns.

== Early life ==
Amika Shail was born in Uttarpara in the Hooghly district of West Bengal and currently lives in Mumbai. Amika started her career on the silver screen as a contestant on Sa Re Ga Ma Pa Lil Champs singing reality show at the age of 9.

Amika started learning music at the age of 5 years from her mother. Amika has also participated in Bengali version of "Sa Re Ga Ma Pa". She later participated in other singing reality shows like - Sa Re Ga Ma Pa National Talent Hunt, Indian Idol, Star Voice of India and All India Radio Show.

The actress is a post graduate in Hindustani Classical Music passed out as a Sangeet Visharad. Amika has lent her voice to the television commercials of brands such as Dabur, Colgate, Santoor, Ujala and IPL.

The actress in a candid interview had admitted that she had taken up the job as a music teacher during her early struggling days in Mumbai to make ends meet.The actress considers A.R. Rahman as her music inspiration. She considers Priyanka Chopra to be her acting inspiration.

== Acting Breakthrough ==
Amika got a career breakthrough when she started acting on television starting with ‘Udaan’. Later, she then went on to act in television soaps like ‘Divya Drishti’, ‘Balveer Returns’, etc.

Amika has also been a part of television series like ‘Madam Sir’, ‘Laal Ishq’, ‘Shaadi ke Siyape’ ‘Gunah’ and ‘Abhay’.

Amika in an interview mentioned that "After being a singer, I realized that I could try my hand at acting. I was very fascinated by the television industry right from the time I participated in singing reality shows. I admit that I came to Mumbai with the goal of being a singer, but acting drew me towards itself. ‘Udaan’ boosted my confidence and motivated me to go for more."

Amika currently is the Indian Brand Ambassador for the South African Brand ESN also known as The global brand endorser is the star Cricketer Jonty Rhodes. The actress is a fitness freak and considers Milkha Singh as her fitness inspiration.

Post the COVID-19 induced lockdown in the country, the actress is doing only web shows for various OTT platforms and taken a break from TV for sometime.

== Filmography ==
Key
†	Denotes titles that have not yet been released

- All films and web series are in Hindi otherwise noted.

=== Television ===
Year	Title	Role	Channel
2018	Savdhaan India	N/A	Star Bharat
2019	Udaan	Jyoti	Colors TV
2019-20	Divya Drishti	Twinkle Shergill	Star Plus
2021	Balveer Returns	Vayu Pari / Vidhi	Sony SAB
2019	Shaadi Ke Siyape	Prachi	& TV
2018	Laal Ishq	Multiple Characters	&TV
2020	Maddam Sir	Antara	Sony SAB
2025	Ishq Jabariya	Dr. Manisha	Sun Neo

=== Web ===
Year	Title	Role	Platform
2019	Abhay	Office Girl	Zee5
2019	Gunah	Priyanka	YouTube
2020	Gandi Baat 5	Priyanka	ALT Balaji
2020	Laxmmi	Ankita Jain	Disney+Hotstar
2020	Mirzapur 2	Bar Singer	Amazon Prime Video
2020	Mask Man	Aditi	Rabbit
2020	Trapped	Psycho Killer	Rabbit
2021	Nachaniya	Nachaniya	Tamasha
2021	Chattis Aur Maina	Dhani	Disney+Hotstar
2021	Video Call	Komal	Cineprime
2021	Khunnas	Rashmi	Ullu
2021	Intention	Pranjal	Not Decided
2021	Hai Taubba	Lena	AltBalaji
2021	Khudraang	Ishu	Cine 7
2021	Dulhan	Aarti	Cinebox
2021	Good Night	Champa	Ullu
2022	Machaand	Janvi	Dadmas Reclaimer
2022	Unsafe	N/A	N/A
2022	Tuition Teacher	Teacher	Ullu
2022	Mail Trail (Hotspot)	Alisha	Ullu
2022	Untitled Project	Ami	SonyLiv
2023	Manthan	Avantika	EOR TV
2024	Builders	Fatima	Amazon Prime Video
2024	Bekaaboo 3	Rasika Asthana	Altt
2024	Dog	Ria	Prime video
2025	Khakee: The Bengal Chapter	Miththu	Netflix India
2025	Hasratain 2	TBA	Hungama
2025	High Dose †	Netra	TBA
2025	12 A.M †	Neha	TBA

Feature Films

Year	Title	Role	Note	Platform
2018	I Am Roshni	Rani	Supporting Role	Crescendo Music
2023	Bandra	Item Girl	Cameo	Malayalam Films
2025	Mussorii Boyz †	Ria	Completed	JSR Production House
2025	Rangbaaz Wanted †	TBA	Completed	TBA

== Music ==
Year	Title/Movie	Note
2015	Khamoshiyan	Khamoshiyan (Female)
2015	Comedy Superstar	Title Track
2015	Meri Hastron Mein	Official Music Video
2016	Ankhan Sharabi	Official Music Video
2017	Ittefaqan	Playback Song
2018	Chal Chale (I am Roshni)	Playback Song
2019	Akhiyan (Agr Hum Bache hote)	Playback Song
2019	Suhagan Teri (Agr Hum Bache hote)	Playback Song
2019	Jab se Mile Ho (Agr Hum Bache hote)	Playback Song
2019	Rangdi (agr hum Bache hote)	Playback Song
2021	Saiyan Bina Ghar Sona	Salman Ali Music Video
2022	Untitled Item Number / Nobody	Special Appearance
2022	Nachaniya	Original Sound Track
2022	Nacho Saare	Special Appearance
2022	Dhokha	Special Appearance
2023	Beating Beating	Special Appearance
2026	Dhak Baja	Independent Durga Puja single, written, composed and performed by Shail

== Album ==
Year	Album	Songs	Feature	Note
2017-18	Jam With Amika	Saaiyan, Zindagi, Khuwaab, Tere Naal, Come on the Floor, Mahiya, Jill & Jim, Beinteha	Ringo Basu, Japinder Sindhu, Abhishek euphony	YouTube, Spotify, Hungama

== Reality Shows ==
Year	Show	Channel
2006	Sa Re Ga Ma Pa L'il Champs	Zee TV
2007	Bengali Sa Re Ga Ma Pa L'il Champs	Zee Bangla
2008	Star Voice of India - Chhote Ustaad	Star Plus
2012	Indian Idol	Sony Entertainment Television
2013	Bharat Ki Shaan: Singing Star	DD National

== Media ==
Amika is very active on social media platforms including Instagram, Twitter, Facebook and YouTube page. The actress is one of the top 10 most followed Indian Cover Singers on YouTube. The social media photoshoots that the actress does often become a talking point in the media.

The actress also represented India at the World Youth Forum in Egypt for the second time in 2022. She sang and performed on a song in front of Global audience which included the President of Egypt. She was also felicitated at the Egyptian Embassy in India for the same.

== See also ==
- List of Indian television actresses
- List of Indian film actresses
- List of people from West Bengal
