= Lockdown Ki Love Story =

Indian television series

- Genre: Romance; Comedy
- Created by: Rashmi Sharma
- Written by: Shanti Bhushan; Dialogues; Sanjay Masoom
- Screenplay by: Shivangi Singh; Anubhav Proothi
- Directed by: Pawan Sahu
- Creative director: Pavitra Kumar
- Starring: Sana Sayyad; Mohit Malik
- Opening theme: Lockdown Mein Phas Gaye Sajni Sajna
- Composer: Nishant-Raja
- Country of origin: India
- Original language: Hindi
- No. of seasons: 1
- No. of episodes: 125

Production
- Producers: Rashmi Sharma; Pawan Kumar Marut
- Editor: Monu Singh
- Camera setup: Multi-camera
- Running time: 24–25 minutes
- Production company: Rashmi Sharma Telefilms

Original release
- Network: StarPlus
- Release: 31 August 2020 – 23 January 2021

Lockdown Ki Love Story (transl. A Lockdown Love Story) is an Indian television drama series that aired from 31 August 2020 to 23 January 2021 on Star Plus. Produced by Rashmi Sharma under Rashmi Sharma Telefilms, it starred Sana Sayyad and Mohit Malik.

== Plot ==
Set in Mughalsarai, the series follows the love story of Dhruv and Sonam who are forced to share a house with their respective families; due to the COVID-19 pandemic lockdown.

Dhruv's mother, Nutan and his aunt, Sheetal oppose their relationship; due to Sonam's modern ways while her father, Pratap finds Dhruv's family very backward in their thinking. The main supporters of the union are Sonam's mother, Subhadra and Dhruv's father, Shashikant. Despite Nutan, Sheetal and Pratap's numerous plots, the wedding of Dhruv and Sonam was still on. Nutan, Sheetal, Pratap and Tanu collaborate to stop their wedding. Their plan is to get Dhruv to marry his childhood friend, Milky; who has always had a crush on Dhruv. Milky persuades Sonam to go to her mother to do bridal makeup while she impersonates Sonam as the bride. Sonam does so and Milky's mother manages to drug her to sleep. Sonam wakes up too late and witnesses Dhruv marrying Milky. Sonam tries to explain why she wasn't at the wedding, but Milky and Nutan place all the blame on Sonam. This continues to a point when Nutan burns herself intentionally. Dhruv in a fit of rage, throws Sonam and her family out of the house.

Dhruv does not accept Milky as his wife, despite his mother's pleas. Sonam realizes the truth of what happened on the wedding day and decides to expose Milky to Dhruv as a cheat. Later, Sonam learns that she is COVID-19 positive and the police force the Jaiswals to let her stay in the house as she was staying there before.

In an attempt to return Sonam to Mumbai, Dhruv sends kidnappers after her. However, the kidnappers mistakenly take Milky instead of Sonam. Hulchal and Babloo save Milky from the kidnappers but they call Milky's mother and demand she tell the truth about what happened on the wedding day to the Jaiswals in exchange for Milky. Their plan almost succeeds, but Dhruv spoils it by finding Milky and bringing her back before Milky's mother could confess. Dhruv reveals that Sonam never had COVID-19 and it was all an act to get her in the house. Later, when Dhruv wants to send Sonam out of the house Shasikant opposes his decision and decides to conduct a voting poll for Sonam to stay in the house or not. Sonam wins the voting poll and stays in the house. Later, Nutan decides to Dhruv's future with a coin toss and Dhruv stops that. Later, he knows that both sides are tail so that his mother can win and reveals the truth to everyone.

Dhruv hears Sonam's side of the story and challenges her to bring him evidence of this in seven days. If she fails, Sonam will return to Mumbai on the eighth day. Now Dhruv's estranged cousin, Raghav comes into the story. He hates Dhruv and plans on using Sonam, with who he is in love, to get revenge against Dhruv. He also has a video of Milky's mother admitting to what happened in the wedding. Due to a misunderstanding created by Raghav; Dhruv throws Sonam out of the house again where Raghav kidnaps her and tries to forcefully marry her. Dhruv rescues Sonam and finally sees the evidence. Dhruv confronts the conspirators and he decides to marry Sonam. In order to stop this, Milky tries to burn herself in the kitchen. She then files a case against Shashikant, Nutan and Sheetal, accusing them of burning her for dowry. In order to bring Shashikant and Nutan, Sonam makes a deal with Milky and Raghav that if Milky releases the Dhruv family then she will marry Raghav.

Dhruv demands that Sonam marry him after Milky pretends that she realised her mistake and wanted to unite them. On the day of Sonam and Dhruv's marriage, Sonam writes a letter to Dhruv apologizing to him and Dhruv rushes to Sonam after he finds out that Raghav is forcefully marrying Sonam, from Raghav's mother, Sumitra. Dhruv and Raghav fight and Raghav shoots Sonam, but Dhruv saves her and is shot. The next morning Sonam notices that Dhruv is acting like a child and has lost his memory. To cheer up Dhruv, Sonam dresses up like a kid and helps Dhruv to face all the problems he was facing because of the other children. In the beginning, Milky loved Dhruv but now she hates him because he is equal to a child and doesn't want him in her life. So she kidnaps Dhruv with her mother's help but Sonam finds Dhruv. An attacker tries to murder Dhruv, but she saves him seeing her love for Dhruv.

Nutan apologises to Sonam for the mistrust. Nutan and Sonam expel Milky from their home. Milky expels Sonam and Dhruv's family from their house and Milky blackmails Dhruv. Due to the stress; Dhruv falls unconscious and is hospitalised. Sheetal apologies to Sonam and helps her mislead Milky and recover their house. Dhruv's memory returns. Dhruv and Sonam decide to marry and Sonam's father approves. Milky schemes to break Sonam and Dhruv's marriage. She makes a fake report of pregnancy and murders Dhruv's servant Batasha as he hears her plans. Seeing this, Milky blackmails Nutan to kill Sonam otherwise she will kill the whole family. Sonam eludes many attacks on her. On the other side, Sheetal and Sonam try to find evidence about Milky faking her pregnancy. Soon, Sonam obtains the evidence and marries Dhruv. The story ends on a happy note.

== Cast ==
=== Main ===
- Sana Sayyad as Sonam Goel Jaiswal – Pratap and Subadra's elder daughter; Tanu and Amber's sister; Dhruv's wife (2020–2021)
- Mohit Malik as Dhruv Jaiswal – Shashikant and Nutan's younger son; Dheeraj and Sneha's brother; Raghav's cousin; Milky's ex-husband; Sonam's husband (2020–2021)

=== Recurring ===
- Jayati Bhatia as Nutan Jaiswal – Shasikant's wife; Dheeraj, Dhruv and Sneha's mother (2020–2021)
- Vijay Kumar as Shashikant Jaiswal – Shobakant and Sheetal's brother; Nutan's husband; Dheeraj, Dhruv and Sneha's father (2020–2021)
- Anjita Poonia as Shweta "Milky” Gupta – Kutal's daughter; Dhruv's friend and ex-wife (2020–2021)
- Ananya Agarwal as Sneha Jaiswal – Shasikant and Nutan's daughter; Dheeraj and Dhruv's sister; Raghav's cousin (2020–2021)
- Ashutosh Tiwari as Dheeraj Jaiswal – Shashikant and Nutan's elder son; Dhruv and Sneha's brother; Raghav's cousin; Ankita's husband (2020–2021)
- Deepika Upadhyay as Ankita Jaiswal – Dheeraj's wife (2020–2021)
- Ananya Khare as Sheetal Jaiswal – Shashikant and Shobhakant's sister; Dheeraj, Dhruv, Raghav and Sneha's aunt (2020–2021)
- Aniruddh Dave as Raghav Jaiswal – Shobhkant and Sumitra's son; Dheeraj, Dhruv and Sneha's cousin (2020–2021)
- Adi Irani as Shobhakant Jaiswal – Shashikant and Sheetal's brother; Sumitra's husband; Raghav's father (2020–2021)
- Leena Badoli as Sumitra Jaiswal – Shobhakant's wife; Raghav's mother (2020–2021)
- Rakesh Kukreti as Pratap Goel – Subadra's husband; Sonam, Tanu and Amber's father (2020–2021)
- Kashish Duggal Paul as Subhadra Goel – Pratap's wife; Sonam, Tanu and Amber's mother (2020–2021)
- Nazea Hasan Sayed as Tanu Goel – Pratap and Subadra's younger daughter; Sonam and Amber's sister (2020–2021)
- Ravin Makhija as Amber Goel – Subhadra and Pratap's son; Sonam and Tanu's brother (2020–2021)
- Saniya Nagdev as Kutal Gupta – Milky's mother (2020–2021)
- Saahil Rao as Batasha – Dhruv's cousin (2020–2021)
- Yash Choudhary as Hulchul – Dhruv's childhood friend (2020)
- Abhishek Goyal as Bablu – Dhruv's childhood friend (2020)
- Rajveer Singh as Munna Bhavani – kidnapper (2021)

== Production ==
=== Development ===
Initially titled as Lockdown Ki Love Story, it was renamed Quarantine Mein Prem Kahaani while in pre-production. Shooting began in December 2020.

Days before the end of the series, Malik playing Dhruv tested positive for COVID-19 and did not shoot for the series and he was not shown in the series for last few episodes and for the finale episode, few of his parts was taken from the previous shots while some portions were covered with a dupe of him.

=== Casting ===
Mohit Malik was selected to portray Dhruv Jaiswal. Speaking on his preparation for his role, "My character in the show speaks Bhojpuri dialect since he is based in Benaras. When this role was offered to me, we were in the lockdown phase and I utilized that time to sharpen my hold over this particular dialect. Even when we use to do workshops with our scriptwriters, I spent extra time with them to understand the tone and tonality of the dialect/language.

== Reception ==
Weeks after premiere, the series saw a rise in its ratings from TRP of 0.9 to 1.3 gradually in its early prime time slot of 7:00 pm (IST). It was later shifted to the late night slot of 11:00 pm (IST), due to the launch of Star Plus's new show Shaurya Aur Anokhi Ki Kahani at 7:00 pm but the ratings continued to languish.
