= Spy Bahu =

Indian television series

- Genre: Drama
- Created by: Ashvini Yardi
- Screenplay by: Gautam Hegde; Nitish Bakshi
- Story by: Srinita Bhowmick; Prakriti Mukherjee
- Directed by: Niraj Pandey
- Starring: Sehban Azim; Sana Sayyad
- Narrated by: Kareena Kapoor Khan
- Music by: Lenin Nandi
- Country of origin: India
- Original language: Hindi
- No. of seasons: 1
- No. of episodes: 143

Production
- Producer: Ashvini Yardi
- Camera setup: Multi-camera
- Running time: 20-25 minutes
- Production company: Viniyard Films

Original release
- Network: Colors TV
- Release: 14 March – 30 September 2022

Spy Bahu (transl. A Spy Daughter-in-Law) is an Indian Hindi-language television spy drama series that premiered on 14 March 2022 on Colors TV. It is digitally available on Voot. Produced by Ashvini Yardi under the banner of Viniyard Films, it stars Sana Sayyad and Sehban Azim. The series went off-air on 30 September 2022.

== Plot ==
Mahira Mirza is a young girl from Kashmir, whose parents Sharif and Aayat were killed in a terrorist attack and she got separated from her brother. She gets adopted by Saras and Minal Kotadia, who changes her name to Sejal Kotadia. While, her brother Fareed is adopted by Shera and becomes Abhishek Singh.

Yohan Nanda, is the son of rich businessman Arun Nanda, his mother Aarti died when he was young and he hates his step-mother and aunt Veera Nanda. He lives with his brothers Shail and Krish, sister Drishti and sister-in-law Shalini. Veera in reality is a terrorist and runs a group named "Mission Azaadi".

Sejal eventually join RAW with the help of S.K. and Tanha. She enters the Nanda mansion in order to spy on Yohan, who is suspected. She eventually learns that Yohan is innocent and Veera is the real culprit. She also learns that her brother, Abhishek is married to Yohan's sister Drishti. Abhishek loses his life in a mission to avenge his family's death, leaving Drishti in deep shock. She later give birth to Fareed's(aka Abhishek) son Aditya.

Veera makes her assistant Ahana enter the Nanda house as fake Mahira. They together prove Sejal as a terrorist and she is arrested. During court's hearing, Sejal's police van is forced to fall off the cliff by Ahana and Sejal is presumed dead.

=== 6 months later ===
Sejal disguises as Paro and is pregnant. She re-enters the Nanda house faking memory loss. With her constant efforts, Yohan finds out that his mother was killed by Veera. They also found that Veera and Ahana were giving wrong medicines to Drishti. They together decides to expose Veera.

Veera tries to kill Shalini when she finds out her truth. Shalini is however, saved by Yohan and Sejal. Veera plans to kill the Nandas in a blast during Ganpati. But, Sejal saves everyone on time. Veera is exposed and is arrested by SK. Yohan is arrested on false charges of rape, through a plan made by Ahana and Veera.

During the court hearing, Yohan proves himself innocent, but Ahana turns the table around. Veera escapes police custody with Arbaaz's help and SK sir is killed by a bomb planted in the court. Sejal promises to catch Veera. Sejal is finally able to capture Veera who is killed while escaping. Ahana and Arbaaz are arrested.

Sejal is awarded for her bravery. She later gives birth to a baby girl, Hichki. Yohan is asked by Tanha to join as a spy. He and Sejal are assigned their new mission in Lucknow. The show ends on a happy note with Sejal, Yohan and Hichki enjoying their family time.

== Cast ==
=== Main ===
- Sana Sayyad as Mahira Mirza Nanda / Sejal Saras Kottadia Nanda: Sharif and Aayat's daughter; Saras and Minal's adopted daughter; Abhishek's sister; Bumba's adopted sister; Yohan's wife; Hichki's mother
  - Hardika Sharma as Child Mahira Mirza
- Sehban Azim as Yohan Nanda: Arun and Aarti's younger son; Veera's nephew/step-son; Shail and Drishti's brother; Krish's half-brother; Sejal's husband; Hichki's father

=== Recurring ===
- Ayub Khan as Arun Nanda: Aarti's widower; Veera's husband; Shail, Yohan, Drishti and Krish's father; Hichki and Aditya's grandfather
- Parineeta Borthakur as Veera Nanda: Aarti's younger sister; Arun's second wife; Krish's mother; Shail, Yohan, and Drishti's aunt/step-mother; Hichki and Aditya's grandaunt/step-grandmother
- Ram Yashvardhan Passi as Shail Nanda: Arun and Aarti's elder son; Yohan and Drishti's brother; Krish's half-brother; Shalini's husband
- Nikunj Malik as Shalini Nanda: Shail's wife
- Sayali Salunkhe / Aditi Bhagat as Drishti Nanda Mirza: Arun and Aarti's daughter; Shail and Yohan's sister; Krish's half-sister; Abhishek's wife; Aditya's mother
- Wasim Mushtaq as Fareed "Abhishek" Mirza: Sharif and Aayat's son; Shera's adopted son; Sejal's brother; Dhristi's husband; Aditya's father (Dead)
- Devashish Chandiramani as Krish Nanda: Arun and Veera's son; Shail, Yohan and Drishti's half-brother
- Sanjeev Jotangia as Saras Kotadia: Minal's husband; Bumba's father; Sejal's adoptive father
- Bhavana Balsavar as Minal Kotadia: Saras's wife; Bumba's mother; Sejal's adoptive mother
- Shubha Khote as Mrs. Kotadia: Saras's mother; Bumba's grandmother; Sejal's adoptive grandmother
- Ekagra Dwivedi as Bumba Kotadia: Saras and Minal's son; Sejal's adoptive younger brother
- Kiran Karmarkar as Suryakant Sharma; RAW officer; one of Sejal's boss
- Krunal Pandit as Tanha; RAW officer; one of Sejal's boss
- Sara Khan as Ahana / fake Mahira: Veera's terrorist group member
- Shivendraa Saainiyol as Shera Singh: Nanda's head of security; Abhishek's adoptive father
- Subir Rana as Harsh: Sejal's colleague and a spy
- Aaryaa Sharma as Aarti Nanda: Arun's first wife; Veera's sister; Shail, Yohan and Drishti's mother; Hichki and Aditya's grandmother (Dead)
- Aafreen Dabestani as Alisha Kapoor: Yohan's former fiancée
- Manas Shah as Jatin: Sejal's best friend and former fiancé

=== Cameo appearance ===
- Kareena Kapoor Khan as narrator in the first episode

== Production ==
=== Development ===
Ashvini Yardi roped in actress Kareena Kapoor Khan as the narrator for the promos and the show. On her part, Kapoor said, "Spy Bahu is a fascinating love story that has left me captivated. The audience is going to love Sejal and Yohan's chemistry and enjoy this power-packed show."

Sana Sayyad on her role and shows comparison to Raazi said, "While the story is about an undercover agent, it has nothing to do with Raazi or even Ek Tha Tiger. With our show, we want to pay tribute to the many unnamed detectives, who are no less than soldiers for us. Sejal's flaws make her different. Honestly, I have always wanted to play a RAW agent or a spy and I feel I manifested this project."

=== Casting ===
Sana Sayyad was cast to portray Mahira Mirza/Sejal Kotadia opposite Azim. Sana had to gain weight for her role of a spy. Sehban Azim was chosen to portray Yohan Nanda opposite Sayyad. He had to lose 8 kgs for his role of a businessman.

Parineeta Borthakur was cast as the main antagonist Veera Nanda. Wasim Mushtaq was roped in to portray Sejal's brother Fareed/Abhishek. But his track ended within 4 months. In July 2022, Sara Khan entered the show as Ahana.

=== Filming ===
The series is set in New Delhi and in Kashmir. It is mainly shot at the Film City, Mumbai. Some initial sequences were shot in Kashmir. The team also shot in Srinagar, including Lal Chowk.

=== Release ===
The series promos were released in February 2022, where Kareena Kapoor Khan introduced the characters of Sejal and Yohan. Spy Bahu premiered on 14 March 2022 on Colors TV and digitally on Voot.

=== Cancellation ===
The series went off-air on 30 September 2022. Sehban Azim said, "Everyone was obviously sad on the last day of the shoot, as we were expecting the show to run longer. The story was nice and so were the cast and the production house. In fact, even the ratings were decent as compared to other shows on the channel. I think there are more shows in the offing. They might come come up with a 2.0 and I would love to take it up if it's the same team."

== Reception ==
=== Critical reception ===
Spy Bahu generally received positive reviews from critics. Rasika Deshpande said, " It is pretty intriguing and keeps you hooked onto it. It looks promising and moreover very interesting. Spy Bahu brings on board something different yet strong on Television after a pretty long time."

== Soundtrack ==
Spy Bahu Original Sound Track

Soundtrack album by Lenin Nandi
- Released: 14 March 2022
- Genres: Romance; Soundtrack
- Length: 3:30
- Language: Hindi
- Label: Viacom 18
- Producer: Ashvini Yardi

Spy Bahu soundtrack is composed by Lenin Nandi. The series theme music was taken from the 2005 film Salaam Namaste's song "My Dil Goes Mmmm". The track "Keh Do Naa" is the theme song of Yohan and Sejal.

Spy Bahu: Tracklisting
No.	Title	Artist	Length
1.	"Spy Bahu" (Theme)	Lenin Nandi	0:30
2.	"Keh Do Naa" (Duet)	Sumedha Karmahe; Himanshu Kohli	3:00

== Awards and nominations ==
Year	Award	Category	Recipient	Result	Ref.
2022	Indian Television Academy Awards	Popular Actress (Drama)	Sana Sayyad	Nominated	
2022	Indian Television Academy Awards	Popular Actor (Drama)	Sehban Azim	Nominated	
2022	Indian Television Academy Awards	Popular Serial (Drama)	Spy Bahu	Nominated	
2023	Gold Awards	Best Actress in a Leading Role	Sana Sayyad	Nominated	
2023	Gold Awards	Best Actor in a Leading Role	Sehban Azim	Nominated	
2023	Gold Awards	Best Director	Niraj Pandey	Nominated	

== See also ==
- List of programmes broadcast by Colors TV
