= Papa by Chance =

- Genre: Soap opera
- Creative director: Darshna Singrole
- Starring: See below.
- Country of origin: India
- Original language: Hindi
- No. of seasons: 1
- No. of episodes: 79

Production
- Producers: Amir Raza Gulam Jaffer; Sonali Jaffer
- Production locations: Delhi, India
- Camera setup: Multi-camera
- Running time: 20 Minutes
- Production company: Full House Media

Original release
- Network: Star Bharat
- Release: 20 August – 19 November 2018

Papa by Chance is a Hindi-language Indian television series. It is produced by Full House Media, and premiered on 20 August 2018 on Star Bharat. The show stars Zebby Singh, Sana Sayyad and Priya Tandon.

== Plot ==
The show is about a spoilt, rich man named Yuvaan who falls in the conspiracy of his deceased father, Samrat Chopra's servant, Harman Battra. As a result, he misunderstands that he accidentally killed a couple after the brakes of his car fail. But in reality, the deceased couple had committed suicide. In order to make amends for his mistake and to win the case of Samrat's property, he decides to become the custodian of the three children Dhoni, Ullu & Gungun Chatwaal of the ill-fated couple on the advice his new lawyer, Kashvi. Fighting a court case for his father's inheritance, Yuvaan looks for help from his friend but is turned down. But still Yuvaan steadily fulfils his duty for the children. Bantoo helps him get a roof over their head. The kids being taunted by Yuvaan, set a fire in the house. Thereafter when the Judge learns about Yuvaan's move, she initially refuses his children's custodianship but Yuvaan cleverly locks himself inside the jail whereupon seeing his stubbornness, she cautions him of heavy paternity responsibility and allows him to be the custodian. Having no roof over his head, Yuvaan is left with the only option of taking refuge in his deceased father's old house along with the three children where he meets his childhood friend, Amrit. The unaccepted arrival of Yuvaan in Amrit's house (Amrit Nivas) during her engagement fires Amrit and she slaps Yuvaan and kicks him out of the house. Yuvaan also becomes furious and asks her to empty the house as it is lawfully a property of Yuvaan.

Meanwhile, Mohini, the paternal aunt of Amrit, had come to attend the marriage begins plotting against Harman as he had dumped her got in relationship with Sucharita, Yuvaan's Mother to get the billionaire inheritance. She also cautions Sucharita but she turns a deaf ear to her. Back to Amrit, we see that Bela, Amrit's Mother convinces both Amrit and Yuvaan to stay under the same rooftop; secretly she plans to make both of them befriend again and eventually get married. But the main problems come when Yuvaan's adopted children come in the house and Amrit refuses to stay with them. In spite of Amrit's refusal on the advice of Gungun, Yuvaan stealthily keeps the children in the house. After when Yuvaan found himself in trouble when the Children were forced to say "that Yuvaan is careless and not good for them", children know about the reality of the death of their parents, they don't panic about what they are forced to say and presents all the events and reality happened with all of them. Kachvi (Yuvaan's lawyer) makes every stage help to win Yuvaan and children.

The Judge announces Yuvaan to be the rightful owner of the children and Yuvaan again gets custody of children. However, Jenny makes the Children's life full of tragedy and helplessness, but as soon as Yuvaan finds out Jenny's plan, he resolves the issues and then returns to his rich life. In the end, the show takes a short leap and they all live happily .

== Cast ==
Played by	Character	Details
Zebby Singh	Yuvaan Chopra	Sucharita and Samrat's son; Harman's stepson; Gungun, Ullu and Dhoni's adoptive father; Amrit's husband.
Sana Sayyad	Amrit Chopra/Kakkar	Bela's daughter; Yuvaan's wife.
Priya Tandon	Kashvi Rathi/Kachvi	Yuvaan's lawyer.
Arishfa Khan	Gurneet Chatwal	Ullu and Dhoni's sister; Yuvaan's adopted daughter.
Bhanushali Ishant	Balwinder Chatwal	Gungun and Dhoni's brother; Yuvaan's adopted son.
Siddharth Dubey	Dhoni Chatwal	Gungun and Ullu's brother; Yuvaan's adopted son
Manasi Salvi	Sucharita Saxena	Samrat and Harman's wife; Yuvaan's mother.
Jiten Lalwani	Harman Batra	Former Servant of Chopras; Sucharita's second husband; Yuvaan's stepfather.
Vibha Bhagat	Bela Kakkar	Amrit's mother.
Ginnie Virdi	Mohini Kakkar	Amrit's paternal aunt.
Sheen Dass	Jineeta Patel/Jinni	Miss Chandni Chowk.
Manu Malik	Mr. Samrat Chopra	Sucharita's first husband; Yuvan's father.
