= Karan Sharma (TV actor) =

Indian actor

- Occupations: Actor; model
- Years active: 2009–present
- Known for: Sasural Simar Ka 2
- Spouse: Tiaara Kar (m. 2016; div. 2019) Pooja Singh (m. 2024)

Karan Sharma is an Indian television actor. He played Karan Modi in the show Ekk Nayi Pehchaan on Sony TV. He is known for playing Vivaan Oswal in the Colors TV television show Sasural Simar Ka 2. He recently played the role of Murtazim Siddiqui in Udaariyaan.

== Early life and family ==
Karan was born in Garhwali family from Ranipokhari in Dehradun, Uttarakhand and his father was in Indian Army.

He started his acting career from National School of Drama in Delhi acting in English and Kannada plays. He continued his stage career appearing as lead roles in various plays. In 2018, Sharma was due to appear in the mythological show Karn Sangini but was dropped at the last minute.

== Personal life ==
In December 2019, he divorced his wife Tiaara Kar after three years of relationship.

On 30 March 2024, Karan Sharma married Pooja Singh.

== Filmography ==
=== Television ===
Year	Title	Role	Notes
2009–2010	Pyaar Ka Bandhan	Sujoy Das/Aziz	
2010	Baa Bahoo Aur Baby	Anirudh Desai	
2010	Sapnon Se Bhare Naina	Abhi	
2010	Bandini	Krishna Arjan Mahiyavanshi	
2010–2011	Yeh Rishta Kya Kehlata Hai	Rishabh	
2012	Pavitra Rishta	Sunny Mukesh Khandeshi	
2012	Gumraah: End of Innocence		
2013–2014	Ekk Nayi Pehchaan	Karan Suresh Modi	
2015–2016	Mohi	Ayush Gokhale	
2016	Khidki		
2016	Yeh Hai Aashiqui	Prabhan	
2017	Kaala Teeka	Krishna Sinha	
2018	Bitti Business Waali	Prakash	
2021–2023	Sasural Simar Ka 2	Vivaan Oswal	
2021	Sirf Tum	Vivaan Oswal	Guest
2023	Wagle Ki Duniya – Nayi Peedhi Naye Kissey	Pulkit Sharma	
2024	Udaariyaan	Murtazim Siddiqui	
2025	Dhaakad Beera	Vikram Beniwal	

=== Web series ===
Year	Title	Role	Notes
2024	Pyramid	Milind	
2025	Superstar Naukar	Kartik	Microdrama
2026	Begum of Crime	Guddu	
