= Waseem Mushtaq =

Indian television actor (born 1984)

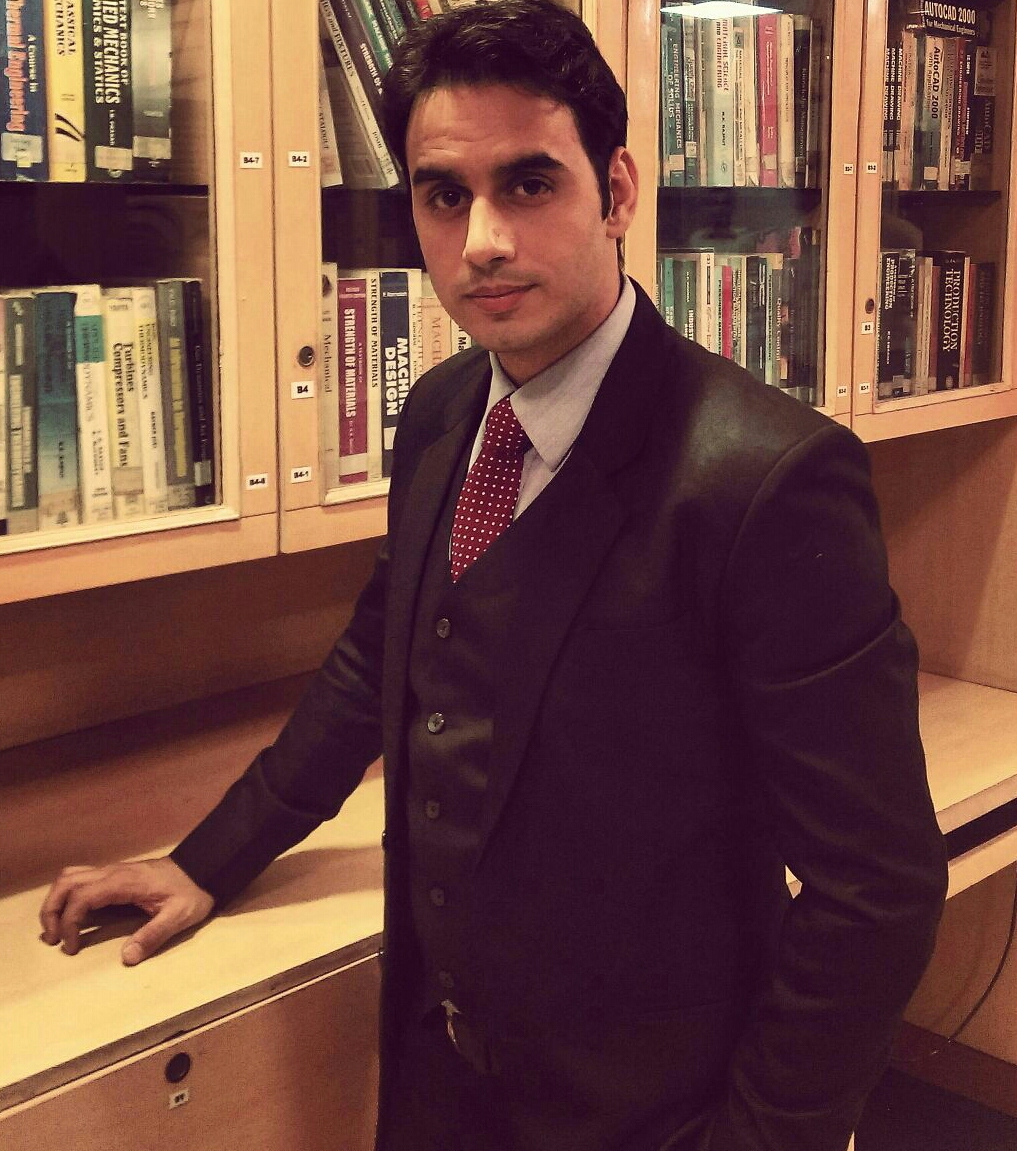
- Mushtaq on the set of Amrit Manthan
- Born: 21 April 1984 (age 42); Srinagar, Kashmir, India
- Occupations: Actor, model
- Years active: 2006–present
- Spouse: Ayesha Mushtaq
- Children: Rayan Mushtaq (son)

Waseem Mushtaq (born 21 April 1984) is an Indian television actor.

== Personal life and career ==
Mushtaq is originally from Srinagar. He auditioned for Indian Idol where judge Anu Malik recommended he try his hand at acting.

== Television ==
Year	Show	Role	Notes
2009–2010	12/24 Karol Bagh	Anuj Sethi	
2010–2011	Bhagyavidhaata	Suraj Sinha	
2012–2013	Amrit Manthan	Tej Malik	
2014	Aur Pyaar Ho Gaya	Akshat Khandelwal	
2014–2015	Box Cricket League 1	Contestant	Player in Chandigarh Cubs
2015	Dilli Wali Thakur Gurls	Aseem	
2015	Killerr Karaoke - Atka Toh Latkah	Himself / Contestant	
2015–2016	Mere Angne Mein	Sujeev Sinha	
2016–2017	Ek Rishta Saajhedari Ka	Sushant Sethia	
2017	Ek Vivah Aisa Bhi	Ravi Parmar	
2017	Savdhaan India	Jay Sinha (Episode 2280)	
2018	Bitti Business Wali	Veerendra	
2019	Shrimad Bhagwat Mahapuran	Rama	
2019–2020	Kahaan Hum Kahaan Tum	Yash Kapoor (YK)	
2021–2022	Sasural Simar Ka 2	Lalit Kashyap	
2022	Spy Bahu	Fareed Mirza / Abhishek Singh	
2023–2024	Aangan – Aapno Kaa	Varun Mehta	
2025	Ram Bhavan	Jagdish Vajpayee	
