= Ginnie Virdi =

Indian television actress

- Born: India
- Occupation: Actress
- Years active: 2010 – present
- Known for: Udaan

Ginnie Virdi is an Indian television actress, who has appeared in Hindi television series, like Rishton Ke Bhanwar Mein Uljhi Niyati, Rab Se Sohna Isshq, and Hazir Jawab Birbal. She was also seen in Udaan(2014).

== Television ==
- Star Plus's Udne Ki Aasha as Mamta Joy Banerjee (2025)
- Sony TV's CID
- Sahara One's Ganesh Leela
- Sahara One's Aakhir Bahu Bhi Toh Beti Hee Hai
- Sahara One's Rishton Ke Bhanwar Mein Uljhi Niyati
- Zee TV's Rab Se Sohna Isshq
- BIG Magic's Hazir Jawab Birbal
- Colors TV's Udaan
- Star Bharat's Papa By Chance
- Shemaroo TV's Karmadhikari Shanidev as Surili
