= Ekk Nayi Pehchaan =

- Genre: Drama; Romance; Comedy
- Screenplay by: Malvika Asthana; Mrinal Tripathi
- Story by: Monali Sen Chowdhury; Neha Singh
- Directed by: Hemant R Prabhu; Santosh Bhatt
- Creative director: Mrinal Tripathi
- Starring: Krystle D'Souza; Poonam Dhillon; Karan Sharma; Namish Taneja; Sooraj Thapar
- Theme music composer: Raju Singh
- Country of origin: India
- Original language: Hindi
- No. of seasons: 1
- No. of episodes: 180

Production
- Producers: Jay Mehta; Kinnari Mehta
- Production location: Mumbai
- Camera setup: Multi-camera
- Running time: About 24 minutes
- Production company: Jay Production

Original release
- Network: Sony TV
- Release: 23 December 2013 – 25 September 2014

Ek Nayi Pehchaan (transl. A new identity) is an Indian television drama series which premiered on Sony TV on 23 December 2013. The series cast veteran Bollywood actresses Poonam Dhillon and Padmini Kolhapure, along with Krystle D'Souza and Karan Sharma. The story, based on a Gujarati play titled Sharda, takes on the issue of women's empowerment through education. The show went off air on 25 September 2014.

== Plot summary ==
Ek Nayi Pehchaan focuses on the relationship between a mother-in-law and her daughter-in-law in an affluent Indian household. The story begins with a well reputed family: Suresh Modi, the owner of Sharda Textiles, his wife Sharda (Poonam Dhillon), his sons Karan and Chirag and married daughter Latika. Karan's marriage is arranged with Sakshi who enters the Modi family as the daughter-in-law.

Sakshi quickly realizes that even though Sharda is a perfect homemaker she lacks self-confidence as she is illiterate. Sharda's husband, Suresh, often finds opportunities to humiliate her as a result of this. Sakshi is deeply hurt on seeing this and decides to help Sharda become literate, independent and confident. She gets Sharda enrolled in an adult education programme. Initially, no one in the family supports Sharda but she is often motivated by Sakshi to carry on. Sharda eventually excels and goes on to start her own small business while still trying to earn her husband's love and respect.

Later, it is revealed that Suresh has two other children, Shanaya and Arav born out of wedlock with another woman Pallavi (Padmini Kolhapure). As the truth emerges, Karan leaves the Modi mansion and family business followed by Sharda and Sakshi. Meanwhile, Sharda starts a new factory. Pallavi's daughter, Shanaya, decides to join the company to sabotage it.

Pallavi is diagnosed with terminal bone cancer and reveals it to the family when Sharda insists she does so and promises her that she will take care of Pallavi's children as her own. Before she dies, Pallavi manages to make Suresh realise Sharda's value and he comes to finally respect her. On Pallavi's death, her will leaves equal share of her property to all five Modi children. While everyone accepts this, Shanaya is furious and accuses Sharda of having manipulated Pallavi. She goes on to try and create a rift between Sharda and her children but Sakshi and Sharda thwart her plans.

In the end, all family members come to understand and accept one another and the show ends on a happy note with Sakshi announcing her pregnancy.

== Cast ==
- Krystle D'Souza as Sakshi Karan Modi
- Karan Sharma as Karan Suresh Modi
- Sooraj Thapar as Suresh Modi / Mahesh Ajmera
- Namish Taneja as Chiraag Suresh Modi
- Ankita Bhargava as Latika Suresh Modi
- Jagrati Sethia as Diya Latika Modi
- Kavita Vaid as Ishwari
- Rita Bhaduri as Dadi
- Rahulram Manchanda as Prateek
- Rituraj Singh as Sharda's professor
- Deepak Sandhu as Aditya
- Padmini Kolhapure as Pallavi Mahesh Ajmera / Pallavi Suresh Modi
- Usha Bachani as Meeta Manchanda
- Nazea Hasan Sayed as Shanaya Mahesh Ajmera / Shanaya Suresh Modi
- Alam Khan as Arav Mahesh Ajmera / Arav Suresh Modi
- Sarika Dhillon as Tasha
