= Udaan (2014 TV series) =

Indian social drama

- Genre: Drama
- Created by: Guroudev Bhalla
- Written by: Robin Bhatt; Javed Siddiqi; Sameer Siddiqui
- Story by: Rajesh Saksham
- Directed by: Loknath Pandey
- Starring: See below
- Opening theme: "Ye Honslo Ki Udaan Hai" by Kailash Kher
- Country of origin: India
- Original language: Hindi
- No. of seasons: 1
- No. of episodes: 1,356

Production
- Executive producers: Guroudev Bhalla; Dhaval Bhalla
- Producer: Mahesh Bhatt
- Camera setup: Multi camera
- Running time: 22 minutes
- Production company: Guroudev Bhalla Screens

Original release
- Network: Colors TV
- Release: 18 August 2014 – 28 June 2019

Udaan (transl. Flight) is an Indian soap opera that premiered on Colors TV on 18 August 2014, replacing Madhubala. This show is the fifth longest running television shows of Colors TV. The story revolves around Chakor, a victim of bonded child labour who fights for her village's freedom and aspires to break free. It starred Spandan Chaturvedi as a child version of Chakor until it took a generation leap in February 2016 and actress Meera Deosthale was brought in to play the role of an adult Chakor. Produced by Mahesh Bhatt, it was originally conceived as a film but that plan was eventually shelved.

== Plot ==
Kamal Narayan, a wealthy landlord in Azadganj village, uses the villagers as bonded labourers. Couple Bhuvan Singh and Kasturi face financial difficulty; as collateral for a loan, they has to let Kamal use their unborn child as a servant. Then, Kasturi gives birth to a girl and names her Chakor.

=== 7 years later ===
Chakor, now a bonded labourer, is an aspiring marathon runner and has a younger sister, Imli. She befriends Kamal's nephew, Vivaan and campaigns for the villagers' rights. She is unaware that she also has a twin sister, Chunni, who was secretly raised in Mumbai. Kamal kills Chunni, motivating Chakor to seek revenge. She escapes with her marathon coach to pursue her dreams and vows to return to the village in 10 years. Vengeful for the betrayal, Kamal gets Chakor's grandmother buried alive.

=== 10 years later ===
Chakor returns after becoming a famous marathon runner. Imli hates her for leaving them all behind. Chakor learns about her grandmother's death and gets Kamal and his son, Suraj arrested. Vivaan and Chakor fall in love while Imli falls for Suraj.

However, Suraj comes back as he promised to be a government witness against his father's deeds. Later, Kamal tries to kill him for his betrayal but he escapes with the help of Chakor, Imli and Vivaan. Suraj, whose marriage is arranged to Tina Raichand, also impregnates Imli. A double ceremony is planned for both Suraj and Vivaan. Imli explains this to Chakor who conspires to switch places in the ceremony. Suraj shows his cruelty by switching them, marrying Imli to Vivaan while he marries Chakor. Imli miscarries and later Vivaan and Imli fall in love. Kamal Narayan returns and forces Suraj to be a bonded laborer. In the process to set him free, Chakor and Suraj also realize their love for each other.

Imli turns evil and gives Vivaan a sleeping pill, putting him into coma. She also conspires with Kamal to have kill Chakor, which presumably succeeds. Chakor survives and learns that she's pregnant with Suraj's child. Suraj finds Chakor and they reunite and return to Azadganj, after forgiving Imli. Kamal kidnaps Chakor and she miscarries. In return, Chakor kills Kamal to avenge the deaths of her family and his prior sins. She gets jailed for 5 years elsewhere Imli hits Suraj with an iron rod, causing him to lose his memory.

=== 5 years later ===
Chakor is released and shocked to learn Imli's truth. She's hurt when Suraj fails to recognize her as he has lost his memory. Chakor motivates villagers to fight back against Imli and Ranvijay's cruelty. One day when Ranvijay tries to kill Chakor, Suraj regains his memories and saves Chakor. They reunite and the couple shares some romantic moments together. Eventually, Chakor becomes pregnant with Suraj's child and gives him the good news. They both come up with a plan and expose Imli and Ranvijay and eventually succeed. Imli has an accident and is presumed dead.

=== 1.5 years later ===
Chakor and Suraj lead a happy life with their baby daughter, Saanvi. Imli returns and tries to create rift in their relationship. Chakor suspects that Imli is alive.

Vivaan also comes back leaving both Suraj and Chakor shocked as they thought he died 7 years ago. Vivaan also believes that Imli is alive igniting Chakor's doubt about the same. Eventually, They find Imli and locks her in a room. Gun dealer Yashwant tries to kill Suraj; when Vivaan gets in the way, Chakor accidentally shoots him to death. Imli swears revenge and kidnaps Saanvi and fakes her death. Suraj blames Chakor for Saanvi's death and severs ties with her. Suraj moves to New York and Chakor moves to a different town while Imli makes Saanvi a bonded labourer.

=== 7 years later ===
Both Chakor and Suraj return to village for work and form a bond with Saanvi, who now renamed as Anjor, unaware of the fact that she's their daughter. Imli finally tells them the truth and an apologetic Suraj reconciles with Chakor and Anjor. Suraj is killed in a bomb-blast, a result of a political fallout. Chakor, pays Suraj's look-alike, Raghav Khanna to take Suraj's place, rather than telling the truth to Anjor and family. Imli turns good and dies while saving Chakor life. Chakor gets jailed for 10 years under false charges and Anjor is adopted by a rich couple.

=== 10 years later ===
Chakor traces her daughter and tries to get close to her. The rich couple tries to separate them and kills Raghav, causing Anjor to leave them. Anjor marries Sameer and they move to Sitapur. Sameer is brutally killed by Ranvijay, who had helped Imli earlier. Chakor and Anjor unite to get revenge and Ranvijay is burnt alive. Finally, Chakor comes back to Azadganj as Anjor decides to stay in Sitapur.

== Cast ==
=== Main ===
- Meera Deosthale / Toral Rasputra as Chakor Singh Rajvanshi: Marathon runner; Kasturi and Bhuvan's eldest daughter; Chunni and Imli's sister; Suraj's widow; Anjor's mother (2016–2019) / (2019)
  - Spandan Chaturvedi as
    - Child Chakor Singh (2014–2016)
    - Chunni Singh: Kasturi and Bhuvan's second daughter; Chakor and Imli's sister (2015–2016)
- Vijayendra Kumeria as
  - Suraj Rajvanshi: Tejaswini and Kamal's son; Bhagya and Ragini's brother; Chakor's husband; Anjor's father (2016–2018)
    - Darshan Gurjar / Apurva Jyotir as Child Suraj Rajvanshi (2014) / (2014–2016)
  - Raghav Khanna: Suraj's lookalike; Chakor's helper (2018–2019) (Dead)
- Vidhi Pandya as Imli Singh Rajvanshi: Kasturi and Bhuvan's youngest daughter; Chakor and Chunni's sister; Ranvijay's ex-wife; Vivaan's widow (2016–2019) (Dead)
  - Tasheen Shah as Child Imli Singh (2014–2016)
- Paras Arora as Vivaan Rajvanshi: Ranjana and Manohar's son; Imli's husband (2016–2018) (Dead)
  - Wahib Kapadia as Child Vivaan Rajvanshi (2014–2016)
- Tanya Sharma as Saanvi "Anjor" Rajvanshi Sharma: Chakor and Suraj's daughter; Jatin and Poonam's adopted daughter; Sameer's widow (2019)
  - Samriddhi Yadav as Child Saanvi "Anjor" Rajvanshi (2018–2019)
  - Aadhya Barot as Baby Saanvi Rajvanshi (2018)
- Gaurav Sareen as Sameer Sharma: Jaya and Manoj's son; Vanshika's brother; Anjor's husband (2019) (Dead)

=== Recurring ===
==== Rajvanshi family ====
- Suhasini Mulay as Shakuntala Devi Rajvanshi: Kamal, Manohar, Nayantara and Bharat's mother; Bhagya, Suraj, Ragini, Vivaan, Gumaan, Mahendra, Narendra and Vaani's grandmother; Anjor and Rohan's great-grandmother (2014–2015) (Dead)
- Sai Balla as Kamal Rajvanshi: Shakuntala's son; Manohar, Nayantara and Bharat's brother; Tejaswini's husband; Ranjana's widower; Bhagya, Suraj and Ragini's father; Anjor's grandfather (2014–2017) (Dead)
- Prachee Pathak as Tejaswini Desai Rajvanshi: Ramesh's sister; Kamal's widow; Bhagya, Suraj and Ragini's mother; Anjor's grandmother (2014–2019) (Dead)
- Vandana Singh as Ragini Rajvanshi: Tejaswini and Kamal's younger daughter; Bhagya and Suraj's sister (2016–2018)
  - Vaishnavi Shukla as Child Ragini Rajvanshi (2014–2016)
- Moni Rai as Manohar Rajvanshi: Shakuntala's son; Kamal, Nayantara and Bharat's brother; Ranjana's first husband; Vivaan's father (2014–2016) (Dead)
- Ginnie Virdi as Ranjana Rajvanshi: Manohar's widow; Kamal's second wife; Vivaan's mother (2014–2017) (Dead)
- Alpana Buch as Nayantara Rajvanshi: Shakuntala's daughter; Kamal, Manohar and Bharat's sister (2015)
- Unknown as Bharat Rajvanshi: Shakuntala's son; Kamal, Manohar and Nayantara's brother; Gumaan, Mahendra Narendra and Vaani's father; Rohan's grandfather (2014)
- Mohammad Nazim as Gumaan Rajvanshi: Bharat's eldest son; Mahendra, Narendra and Vaani's brother; Garima's husband; Rohan's father (2018)
- Aastha Singh as Garima Rajvanshi: Gumaan's wife; Rohan's mother (2018)
- Unknown as Rohan Rajvanshi: Gumaan and Garima's son; Anjor's cousin (2018)
- Unknown as Narendra Rajvanshi: Bharat's second son; Gumaan, Mahendra and Vaani's brother; Madhuri's husband (2018)
- Unknown as Madhuri Rajvanshi: Narendra's wife (2018)
- Abhishek Verma as Mahendra Rajvanshi: Bharat's youngest son; Gumaan, Narendra and Vaani's brother; Vatsala's husband (2018)
- Unknown as Vatsala Rajvanshi: Mahendra's wife (2018)
- Sabina Jat as Advocate Vaani Rajvanshi: Bharat's daughter; Gumaan, Mahendra and Narendra's sister (2018)

==== Singh family ====
- Jhuma Biswas as Savitri Devi Singh: Bhuvan's mother; Chakor, Chunni and Imli's grandmother; Anjor's great-grandmother (2014–2016) (Dead)
- Rajiv Kumar as Bhuvan Singh: Savitri's son; Kasturi's husband; Chakor, Chunni and Imli's father; Anjor's grandfather (2014–2018)
- Sai Deodhar as Kasturi Singh: Bhuvan's wife; Chakor, Chunni and Imli's mother; Anjor's grandmother (2014–2018)

==== Khanna family ====
- Sheetal Pandhya as Bhagya Rajvanshi Khanna: Tejaswini and Kamal's elder daughter; Suraj and Ragini's sister; Arjun's wife (2015–2016)
- Vineet Raina as Arjun Khanna: Mahesh's brother; Chakor's sports coach; Bhagya's husband (2014–2016)
- Amit Dolawat as Mahesh Khanna: Arjun's brother (2015–2016)

==== Rawat family ====
- Sandeep Baswana as District collector Ishwar Rawat: Abha's husband; Aditya's father (2014–2015) (Dead)
- Dolphin Dwivedi as Abha Rawat: Ishwar's widow; Aditya's mother (2014–2015)
- Varun Sharma as Aditya Rawat: Ishwar and Abha's son; Chakor's childhood friend (2016)
  - Yash Mistry as Child Aditya Rawat (2014–2015)

==== Pratap Singh family ====
- Vikas Bhalla as ACP Ranvijay Pratap Singh: Malini and Rajan's son; Kavya and Preeti's brother; Imli's ex-husband; Sameer's murderer (2017–2018; 2019) (Dead)
- Unknown as Rajan Pratap Singh: Malini's husband; Ranvijay, Kavya and Preeti's father (2017)
- Unknown as Malini Pratap Singh: Rajan's wife; Ranvijay, Kavya and Preeti's mother (2017)
- Simran Khanna as Kavya Pratap Singh: Rajan and Malini's elder daughter; Ranvijay and Preeti's sister (2017)
- Sakshi Sharma as Preeti Pratap Singh: Rajan and Malini's younger daughter; Ranvijay and Kavya's sister (2017)

==== Desai family ====
- Unknown as Ramesh Desai: Tejaswini's brother; Amit, Arvind and Jyoti's father (2018)
- Amika Shail as Jyoti Desai Singh: Ramesh's daughter; Amit and Arvind's sister; Bhagya, Suraj and Ragini's cousin; Akash's wife (2018–2019)
- Manish Naggdev as Akash Singh: Rajeshwari's son; Vikram's brother; Jyoti's husband (2018–2019)
- Unknown as Amit Desai: Ramesh's son; Bhagya, Suraj and Ragini's cousin; Arvind and Jyoti's brother (2018)
- Unknown as Arvind Desai: Ramesh's son; Amit and Jyoti's brother; Bhagya, Suraj and Ragini's cousin (2018)

==== Sharma family ====
- Digvijay Purohit as Manoj Sharma: Deepali's brother; Abhiraj's uncle; Jaya's husband; Sameer and Vanshika's father (2019)
- Barsha Chatterjee as Jaya Sharma: Manoj's wife; Sameer and Vanshika's mother (2019)
- Prachi Singh as Vanshika Sharma: Manoj and Jaya's daughter; Sameer's sister; Abhiraj's cousin (2019)

==== Dixit family ====
- Divya Bhatnagar as Deepali Sharma Dixit: Manoj's sister; Abhiraj's mother (2019)
- Shantanu Verma as Abhiraj Dixit: Deepali's son; Sameer and Vanshika's cousin (2019)

=== Other Recurring Cast ===
- Unknown as Hariya (2014)
- Unknown as Girija (2014–2019)
- Nisha Pareek as Laali (2014–2016)
- Unknown as Lovely (2014–2015)
- Rishina Kandhari as Vishakha (2015–2016)
- Prakash Ramchandani as Lakhan Singh: Kamal's henchman; Chagan's father (2014–2017)
- Shresth Kumar as Chagan Singh: Lakhan's son; Chakor's friend; Gauri's husband (2016–2018)
- Sunidhi Chauhan as Gauri Singh: Chagan's wife (2017–2018)
- Jineet Rath as Om (2014–2015)
- Deep Kaur as Swarnaa Rawat (2014–2016)
- Roma Bali as Vaibhavi Deshmukh (2015) (Dead)
- Naveen Sharma as Rakesh "Rocky" Deshmukh (2015–2016)
- Vijay Aidasani as Samarithan Prabhakar Rawat (2014–2015)
- Mukesh Tripathi as Roney (2015–2016)
- Nishikant Dixit as Principal Dharampal Chauhan (2015–2016)
- Sandeep Nuval as Shikhu (2016–2018)
- Vinny Arora as Tina Raichand: Marathon Runner; Chakor's competitor (2016)
- Unknown as Bijli
- Unknown as Leela
- Sehban Azim as Inspector Ajay Khurana (2017)
- Drisha Kalyani as Paakhi Trivedi: Suraj's namesake sister; Chakor's friend (2017–2019) (Dead)
  - Chahat Tewani as Child Paakhi Trivedi (2017)
- Mahi Sharma as Manju Bhatia (2018)
- Keith Sequeira as Karan Oberoi (2018) (Dead)
- Kiran Janjani as Abhay Singhania (2018)
- Abhilash Choudhary as Ankush: Abhay's assistant (2018)
- Unknown as Nisar Bhai (2018)
- Mahesh Thakur as Colonel Yashwant Bedi: Kanchan's brother; Naina's father; Imli's gun dealer; Gumaan's boss (2018) (Dead)
- Swati Kapoor as Naina Bedi: Yashwant's daughter; Chakor and Suraj's friend (2018)
- Kajal Pisal as Kanchan Bedi: Yashwant's sister (2018)
- Neeraj Pandey as Keshav "Kesho" Dave: Sugna's husband; Saanvi's foster father (2018) (Dead)
- Komal Sharma as Sugna Dave: Keshav's wife; Saanvi's foster mother (2018) (Dead)
- Avisha Shahu as Tuntun Jagabandhi: Saanvi's friend (2018)
- Unknown as Abha (2018)
- Pratima Kazmi as Rajeshwari Devi Singh: Politician; Vikram and Akash's mother (2018) (Dead)
- Mukul Harish as Vikram Singh: Rajeshwari's son; Akash's brother (2018)
- Micckie Dudaaney as Bachcha Pandey: Rajeshwari and Vikram's assistant (2018)
- Minal Mogam as Rajjo: Chakor's friend (2018)
- Unknown as Bhawari Yadav (2018)
- Unknown as Prabhu (2018)
- Karan Mehat as ACP Damodar Chauhan (2018–2019)
- Sanjai Gandhi as Bhanu Pratap Singh (2019)
- Unknown as Lallan Singh (2019)
- Anurag Sharma as Jatin Shroff: Poonam's husband; Anjor's adoptive father (2019)
- Arti Singh as Poonam Shroff: Jatin's wife; Anjor's adoptive mother (2019)
- Urvashi Dholakia as Mohini (2019)
- Ashish Trivedi as Prakash Ahuja: Sameer's friend (2019)
- Ahmad Harhash as Rohan Singh: Rajjo's brother (2018)

=== Special appearances ===
- Vidya Balan, to promote Hamari Adhuri Kahani and Kahaani 2
- Nawazuddin Siddiqui, to promote Manjhi - The Mountain Man
- Ranveer Singh, to promote Bajirao Mastani
- Salman Khan and Anushka Sharma, to promote Sultan
- Shah Rukh Khan and Anushka Sharma, to promote Jab Harry Met Sejal
- Helly Shah as Swara Sanskaar Maheshwari from Swaragini
- Jigyasa Singh as Thapki Bihaan Pandey Kumar from Thapki Pyar Ki
- Manish Goplani as Bihaan Pandey Kumar from Thapki Pyar Ki
- Toral Rasputra as Anandi Shiv Shekhar from Balika Vadhu
- Gracy Goswami as Nandini "Nimboli" Shekhar from Balika Vadhu
- Harshad Chopda as Aditya Hooda from Bepannaah
- Jennifer Winget as Zoya Siddiqui Arora from Bepannah
- Karan Wahi as himself for special dance performance
- Krystle D'Souza as herself for special dance performance
- Rohan Gandotra as Parth Bhanushali from Dil Se Dil Tak
- Rashami Desai as Shorvori Bhattacharya Bhanushali from Dil Se Dil Tak
- Jannat Zubair Rahmani as Pankti Sharma from Tu Aashiqui
- Ritvik Arora as Ahaan Dhanrajgir from Tu Aashiqui

== Crossover episodes ==
No.	Air Date	Serials			
1	February 19, 2016	Ishq Ka Rang Safed	Thapki Pyar Ki	Sasural Simar Ka	
2	March 10, 2016	Ishq Ka Rang Safed	Thapki Pyar Ki	Sasural Simar Ka	
3	March 17, 2016	Thapki Pyar Ki	Sasural Simar Ka	Balika Vadhu	
4	March 29, 2016	Thapki Pyar Ki	Sasural Simar Ka	Udaan	
5	April 8, 2016	Thapki Pyar Ki	Sasural Simar Ka	Udaan	
6	April 21, 2016	Ishq Ka Rang Safed	Thapki Pyar Ki	Sasural Simar Ka	
7	May 12, 2016	Sasural Simar Ka	Udaan	Swaragini	
8	May 20, 2016	Thapki Pyar Ki	Sasural Simar Ka	Udaan	
9	May 26, 2016	Thapki Pyar Ki	Sasural Simar Ka	Balika Vadhu	
10	March 5, 2018	Laado 2	Dil Se Dil Tak	Savitri Devi College & Hospital	Tu Aashiqui

== Broadcaster ==
Language	Release	Drama	Broadcaster
Vietnam	9 August 2017	Doi Canh Tu Do Udann Sapnon Ki	VTVCab 5 - E Channel

== Production ==
It replaced the long-running series Madhubala: Ek Ishq Ek Junoon. The show was produced by Bollywood filmmaker Mahesh Bhatt and was based on his unreleased movie of the same name.

== Reception ==
Udaan was the fourth longest-running Indian television series of Colors TV after Balika Vadhu, Sasural Simar Ka and Uttaran. With more than 1300 episodes, it was one of the longest running Indian television series.
