= Divya Drishti =

Indian supernatural series

- Genre: Supernatural; Thriller; Drama
- Written by: Uddin Nadeem
- Screenplay by: Mrinal Jha; Saima Ahmad
- Story by: Mukta Dhond
- Directed by: Arshad Khan
- Starring: Nyra Banerjee; Sana Sayyad; Adhvik Mahajan; Mishkat Varma; Sangita Ghosh
- Opening theme: Divya Drishti
- Composer: Ashish Rego
- Country of origin: India
- Original language: Hindi
- No. of seasons: 1
- No. of episodes: 106

Production
- Producers: Mukta Dhond; B.P. Singh
- Cinematography: Abhishek Gandhi; Hrishikesh Gandhi
- Camera setup: Multiple-camera setup
- Running time: 41-45 minutes
- Production company: Fireworks Productions

Original release
- Network: StarPlus
- Release: 23 February 2019 – 23 February 2020

Divya Drishti (transl. Divine Sight) is an Indian supernatural drama television series which aired from 23 February 2019 to 23 February 2020 on StarPlus. Produced under Fireworks Productions, it starred Sana Sayyad, Nyra Banerjee, Adhvik Mahajan, Mishkat Varma and Sangita Ghosh.

== Plot ==
The story starts with a pregnant woman, Vidya, meeting with her Guruji. They talk about Pishaachini, a former disciple of Guruji, who is going after three powerful and magical gems of Lord Shiva which are with him. If she gets all three of the gems, she will become so powerful no one will be able to stop her. Guruji had given two of the gems, the Tatva Ratna, with the power to control the elements, and the Mayavi Ratna, with the power of illusions and mind control, to two of his disciples for safekeeping. Pishaachini, however, killed these disciples with her magic and acquired both the gems, which she wears on a pendant, and their powers. She is now after the third and the most powerful of the three gems, the Kaal Vijay Ratna, which has the power to give visions of the future and the power to change the future, which is with Guruji himself. Vidya and Guruji go to his cave, where Pishaachini appears and asks Guruji for the Kaal Vijay Ratna. Guruji uses magic and pushes Pishachini to the side while he throws the gem at Vidya. Pishaachini, recovers and moved in front of the incoming gem to catch it. The Kaal Vijay Ratna then enters her right eye, destroying it and revealing a glowing red light inside it. The gem then goes inside Vidya's womb. Guruji then tells her that her unborn twin children will get the powers of the gem and warns her to beware the dark forces that will come after her and to beware the full moon. He then tells Vidya to run away.

Vidya has two daughters, Divya and Drishti. Gifted with superpowers, Drishti has the ability to see the future while Divya has the power to change the future. Vidya and Sarthak are worried as Pishaachini is hunting them down to steal their powers. They manage to save Divya and Drishti but end up sacrificing themselves. The sisters run away but ultimately get separated and adopted by different families.

=== 20 years later ===
Divya and Drishti are all grown up. Divya is carefree and free-spirited, while Drishti is mature and caring. They constantly try to find each other during full moon nights, feeling each other's presence at times, but yet are unable to identify each other. They coincidentally meet at the fair, both realising each other's presence as their hands were touched slightly unknowingly. Chiranjivi spots both of them and tries to keep them apart so that Pishachini cannot follow them. In an attempt to keep Divya and Drishti apart, he arranges a job for Drishti in Bali whose job turns out to become Rakshith Shergill's personal assistant. Even Divya travels to Bali unknown to Chiranjivi. Rakshit is engaged to Lavanya but starts developing feelings for Drishti. Drishti finds out Divya is her sister but is unable to tell her. Through a series of events, Drishti marries Rakshit and Divya marries Rakshit's cousin brother Shikhar. He is revealed to know everything about Pishaachini and is in cahoots with her. It turns out Shikhar is actually a dupe that Pishaachini placed in the house to do her bidding. Later, Divya also discovers the truth about Dristhi being her sister and both reunite. They decide to find their parents' murderer. Dristhi sees Pishachini murder Sunny and sees Preeto in her true avatar as Pishachini. She tells the whole family, including Divya, but no one believes her because Pishachini resurrects Sunny for 24 hours. Divya eventually comes around to trusting her sister and they both plan on killing Pishachini before Pishachini can hurt them.

Drishti, Divya, Romi (Drishti's adopted brother) and Shikhar join hands to destroy Pishachini. In reality, Shikhar is still working for Pishaachini and letting Pishaachini know everything about the sisters' plan. Divya and Dristhi finally manage to kill Pishaachini but her soul enters Divya's body, turning her into Divyaachini. Drishti manages to separate Divya and Pishachini with the help of a powerful and mysterious man named Anjaan, who tells her that the only way to destroy Pishaachini is to trap her soul in Divya's body. Drishti stabs Divya, which traps Pishaachini's soul in Divya and Divya regains her consciousness. However, Divya and Drishti's lives are connected, so if one twin dies, so does the other. Anjaan seemingly helps Pishaachini reenter her previous body by removing the dagger from Divya's chest. Anjaan also gives Pishaachini the Kaal Vijay ratna, however it turns out to be fake. In reality, he was saving Divya and Drishti from dying. Divya-Drishti get their powers back and let Lord Shiva protect the Kaal Vijay ratna. Simran (Rakshit's cousin) is attacked by Pishaachini as she wants to activate the Kaal Vijay ratna with a virgin girl's blood. Pishaachini figures out the Kaal Vijay ratna she has is fake. Later, Rakshit is revealed to be Anjaan who possesses powers and is trying destroy Pishaachini. Drishti also finds out that Anjaan is Rakshit by touching his forehead, which lets her see his true intentions.

=== After some days ===
Everyone come to know that the doors of the hell are opening and many evil power are coming out from hell who will try to get the Kaal Vijay ratna. Pishaachini's right hand, Bicchhu, ends up dying and she takes his poison for later use as it is the most poisonous substance in the world. Pishaachini asks Anjaan to get Rakshit married with Lavanya, without knowing that Anjaan is Rakshit. Her plan is to stop Rakshit from inheriting his powers from his maternal grandfather, Guruji, as well as break Drishti's raksha kavach. Chiranjivi reveals that Pishaachini used to be human and only way to defeat her is to destroy her human ashes. Meanwhile, Simran's wedding with Agham is canceled as her in-laws find out she has gone crazy after Pishaachini's attack. The household is distressed from the broken wedding so Rakshit announces to get married with Lavanya to maintain the wedding atmosphere. He is actually trying to get to the bottom of Pishaachini's plan by marrying Lavanya. Drishti is heartbroken as she doesn't know worthy Rakshit is doing all this. Amidst all this, Romi follows Anjaan and finds out his real identity. Rakshit reveals that he is faking to help Pishaachini to find out where his dad is. Romi agrees to keep Rakshit's identity a secret and help Rakshit by keeping an eye on Lavanya. Later, Rakshit brings divorce papers for Drishti and she signs it. Divya and Drishti, with Simran's aide, find the place where Pishaachini's ashes are kept. Before Divya-Drishti could destroy the ashes, Pishaachini comes and stops them. On the other hand, Rakshit has arranged for a fake pandit to conduct his wedding with Lavanya so the wedding will be nulled. During the wedding, Lavanya is shown to have turned into an evil lizard being by Pishaachini and her goal is to bite Rakshit and kill him with her poison. Divya-Drishti are left hanging by a bridge after their fight with Pishaachini. While stuck there, Drishti reveals that Anjaan is Rakshit. Finally, Anjaan and Romi come to save the twins. Later, Drishti saves Rakshit after Lavanya poisons him. Lavanya finds out that Divya-Drishti's weakness is dhatura, while Pishaachini finds out that Anjaan is Rakshit.

Pishaachini teams with the evil from hell in order to get the Kaal Vijay ratna for herself. Divya Drishti and others manage to kill the evil powers from hell but Pishaachini becomes successful in taking the ratna and flies away. With all the ratna in hand she tries to merge the power of all ratna but fails. Later, she asks for help from Kaal Devta, the evil Lord of Hell to help her in merging the powers. He tells her that she needs to activate the true power of each of the ratna. He does so with the Tatva and Mayavi Ratna. On Independence Day, Shikhar is revealed to be not the real son of the family, it was Shikhar's imposter who was helping Pishachini in order to gain powers. Divya kills the imposter. Pishaachini successfully activates the Kaal Vijay ratna, but Divya Drishti blow up the building with a bomb Pishaachini placed. The resulting explosion causes Pishaachini to drop all the ratna while fleeing and kills Divya and Drishti.

=== 13 days later ===
Pishaachini lives in the Shergill mansion and is controlling the family mysteriously. Divya and Drishti reincarnate and gain new powers to stop Pishachini once and for all they get all powers of the three ratna. They re-enter the house to find Pishachini. Rakshit has lost his memory due to the blast. Pishaachini gives birth to Patali, her and Kaal Devta's daughter. Rakshit regains his memory and along with Divya and Drishti, defeats Patali.

A few days later, a cunning prisoner escapes from hell fooling the Kaal Devta. He comes through Pisachini's den which leads to the Shergill house and realises that they are a very rich family and decides to rob them. Rakshit traces out the real Shikhar through some detectives using his childhood pictures. The prisoner who has now named himself as Murari, is brought to the Shergill family as the real Shikhar. Pishaachini kills Patali and puts the blame on Divya, sending her to hell. Drishti, Rakshit, Romi and Murari rescue her. Murari has flashbacks of his forgotten childhood and realises that he is real Shikhar. The Shergill family then find out that Shikhar is from hell, putting a strain on Divya and Shikhar's newly budding feelings. Now, the mysterious Laal chakor, an old disciple of Guruji, enters. Laal chakor attacks Rashi, killing her to the chagrin of the Shergill family. To find out Laal chakor's secret, Divya-Drishti decide to go into the cave, where many years ago the kaal vijay ratna was given to Vidya(Divya and Drishti's mother). They find the cave locked and the only way to open it is with their and their husbands hands on four handprints. Divya marries Shikhar since his hand fits the last handprint.

After many tries, Divya and Drishti find an oyster, which holds the secret of the cave. Drishti finds out she is pregnant with twins after a sudden vision. During the Shergill family reunion where Rakshit's cousins arrive, Pishaachini casts a spell, barring every exit with walls that form back when they are broken down. To make matters worse, Laal chakor is attacking members of the Shergill family, killing everyone except Divya-Drishti, Rakshit and Shikhar, who escaped using a magic chest Divya and Drishti encountered in the cave. After escaping, they make a plan to lure Laal chakor and Pishaachini to Divya-Drishti's old house by leaving a note in the Shergill house. A fight ensues between the heroes and the two villains. In a dramatic twist, Laal chakor is revealed to be Mahima, Rakshit's mother, leaving everyone, especially Rakshit, devastated.

Mahima reveals that she was jealous of Vidya because she was given the Kaal Vijay Ratna by Guruji, rather than Mahima, his greatest pupil. Mahima vowed revenge and allied with Pishaachini to kill Vidya and get the gems. Mahima says she can bring back the dead family members with some magic water which she will give to them only if Divya and Drishti kill themselves. They do so, releasing the Tatva Ratna, which Pishaachini takes and the Mayavi Ratna, which Mahima takes. The Kaal Vijay Ratna also came out but disappeared when Divya and Drishti touched hands. Divya and Drishti are resurrected once more, with the help of the two pearls inside the oyster. This came with news that both of them lost their new powers so Drishti can only see the future and Divya only has the power to change the future. Also, Drishti's children were due in 2 days. They return to the Shergill house and they hide in pisaachini's den, where the family is tricking Mahima and Pishaachini into thinking that Divya and Drishti's souls are alive.

Guruji is revealed to be alive, having faked his death and being trapped in the cave by Mahima since then. He allies with Divya-Drishti, who are plotting to destroy Pishaachini and Mahima by turning them on one another. But later he reveals that the Kaal Vijay Ratna was cursed in the first place and he being greedy for powers could not join the three gems and hence approached Vidya, a pure soul who could possibly remove the curse but due to the chaos created by Pishaachini before Vidya touched it led the powers to be split to her children. He later disguised himself as Kaal Devta by killing the real Kaal Devta. Drishti gives birth to her twin children shortly after which Laal chakor is killed by Pishachini and Kaal Devta by Rakshit. Pishaachini then acquires all three ratnas which she combines to form the blue Maha Ratna. She transforms into Maha Pishaachini and tries to kill Divya and Drishti but Lord Shiva ends her once and for all. Divya-Drishti are later revealed to have lost their powers which they are okay with. Drishti's twins are later shown to have Divya-Drishti's powers, while the Maha Ratna, thought to have gone back to Lord Shiva, is revealed to still be on Earth and Drishti's children gain them.

(This is going on Star Bharat)

== Cast ==
=== Main ===
- Sana Sayyad as Drishti Shergill (née Sharma): Vidya and Sarthak's daughter; Divya's twin sister; Nadika and Sarvesh's adoptive daughter; Romi's adoptive sister; Rakshit's wife (2019 - 2020)
  - Tamanna Jain as Child Drishti Sharma (2019)
- Adhvik Mahajan as Rakshit Shergill aka Anjaan: Mahima and Chetan's elder son; Rashi's brother; Lavanya's ex-fiancé; Drishti's husband (2019 - 2020)
- Nyra Banerjee as Divya Shergill (née Sharma): Vidya and Sarthak's daughter; Drishti's twin sister; Brij and Garima's adoptive daughter; Shikhar's wife (2019 - 2020)
  - Aleena Lambe as Child Divya Sharma (2019)
- Mishkat Varma as Shikhar Shergill aka Murari: Ashlesha and Bharat's son; Divya's husband (2019 - 2020)
- Sangita Ghosh as Pishachini: Guruji's ex-disciple; Mohana's friend; Vidya, Sarthak, Sunny and Mahima's murderer; Pataali's mother and murderer (2019 - 2020) (Dead)

=== Recurring ===
- Vaishnavi Macdonald as Mahima Shergill aka Laal Chakor: Guruji's daughter; Chetan's widower; Rakshit's mother; Rashi's mother and murderer; Vidya, Drishti and Divya's enemy; Pishachini's accomplice (2019 - 2020) (Dead)
- Gireesh Sahdev as Chetan Shergill: Bharat's elder brother; Mahima's widower; Rakshit and Rashi's father (2019) (Dead)
- Prakriti Nautiyal as Rashi Shergill: Chetan and Mahima's younger daughter; Rakshit's sister (2019 – 2020) (Dead)
- Parull Chaudhary as Ashlesha Shergill: Bharat's wife; Shikhar’s mother (2019 - 2020)
- Imran Khan as Bharat Shergill: Chetan's younger brother; Ashlesha's husband; Shikhar’s father (2019)
- Ridheema Tiwari as Ojaswini Shergill: Sunny, Simran and Twinkle’s mother (2019–2020)
- Ankit Narang as Sunny Shergill: Ojaswini's son; Simran and Twinkle’s brother; Lavanya's husband (2019) (Dead)
- Mansi Srivastava as Lavanya: An evil Lizard from hell; Rakshit's ex-fiancée; Sunny's widow; Pishachini's accomplice (2019)
- Shrishti Maheshwari as Simran Shergill: Ojaswini's elder daughter; Sunny and Twinkle’s sister; Agham's ex-fiancée (2019 - 2020)
- Amika Shail as Twinkle Shergill: Ojaswini’s younger daughter; Sunny and Simran’s sister (2019 - 2020)
- Richa Rathore as Patali: Pishachini and Kaal Devta's daughter (2019) (Dead)
- Paaras Madaan as Bicchu: Pishachini's right hand (2019) (Dead)
- Raj Zutshi as Guruji: Fake Kaal Devta; Mahima's father, Pishachini's old mentor; Vidya, Chiranjivi, Drishti and Divya's mentor (2019 - 2020)
- Priyank Tatariya as Brij Walia: Garima's husband; Divya's foster father (2019)
- Eva Ahuja as Garima Walia: Brij's wife; Divya's foster mother (2019)
- Ritu Vashisht as Nadika Sood aka Lucky: Sarvesh's wife; Romi's mother; Drishti's foster mother (2019)
- Hetal Puniwala as Sarvesh Sood: Nadika's husband; Romi's father; Drishti's foster father (2019)
- Kushagre Dua as Romi Sood: Nadika and Sarvesh's son; Chiranjivi's disciple; Drishti's adoptive brother (2019 - 2020)
- Antara Banerjee as Chikki Malhotra: Vicky's sister; Laal Chakor's helper (2019–2020)
- Rohit Chaudhary as Vicky Malhotra: Chikki's brother; Laal Chakor's helper (2019)
- Rati Pandey as Vidya Sharma: Sarthak's wife; Drishti and Divya's mother; Guruji's disciple (2019) (Dead)
- Amit Dolawat as Sarthak Sharma: Vidya's husband; Drishti and Divya's father (2019) (Dead)
- Karan Khanna as Daitya Vanar: Shikhar's imposter (2019)
- Antara Biswas as Mohana Rathod: Pishachini's friend from Nazar (2019)

== Production ==
The first promo of the series was released on 24 January 2019 where Sana Sayyad and Sangita Ghosh were introduced.

== Reception ==
=== Critical reception ===
Originally, the series was planned for 52 episodes and to end in July 2019. But, a good response for it gave an extension and it ended on 23 February 2020 completing 106 episodes.

In October 2019, The Times of India criticised the ongoing track then stating: "Divya-Drishti’s latest storyline is crossing all boundaries of bizarreness. This storyline is full of essence which is just opposite of what we expect from a thriller show. We can just wait and hope to witness something very thrilling in the show, something more real than just mere naivety."

=== Ratings ===
Divya Drishti was the seventh most watched Hindi urban television show in its debut week (week 9 of 2019) in India, reaching a TRP of 1.9. In week 45, it was at fourteenth position with 4.32 million impressions with trp of 1.7. Since its premiere, the show has maintained its position in the top 20 most-watched Hindi shows.

== Crossover ==
Nazar and Divya Drishti had a collaboration where Mohana portrayed by Antara Biswas from Nazar entered the show Divya Drishti teaming up with Pishachini portrayed by Sangita Ghosh for a sequence.
