= Avinash Mukherjee =

Indian television actor (born 1997)

- Born: 1 August 1997 (age 28); Noida, Uttar Pradesh, India
- Occupation: Actor
- Years active: 2007–present
- Known for: Balika Vadhu; Sasural Simar Ka 2
- Relatives: Richa Mukherjee (cousin sister)
- Awards: ITA Award for Best Child Artist; Gold Award for Best Child Artist

Avinash Mukherjee (born 1 August 1997) is an Indian television actor. Mukherjee is best known for his portrayal of Young Jagdish Singh in Balika Vadhu and as Aarav Oswal in the TV series Sasural Simar Ka 2. He also played Ranbir Khanna in Itna Karo Na Mujhe Pyaar and Soham Singh in Shakti.

== Filmography ==
=== Television ===
Year	Title	Role	Notes
2007	Ssshhhh	Ashish "Ashu" Bhosle	Child artist Season 2; Episodes 100–101
2008	Ramayan	Bharat	Child artist
2008	Raajkumar Aaryyan	Raajkumar Aaryyan	Child artist
2008–2010	Balika Vadhu	Jagdish "Jagya" Singh	Child artist
2012	Gumrah: End of Innocence	Unnamed	Season 2
2013	Sanskaar – Dharohar Apnon Ki	Ankit Vaishnav	
2014–2015	Itna Karo Na Mujhe Pyaar	Ranbir Khanna	
2014	Pyaar Tune Kya Kiya	Vikas Prajapati	Season 2; Episode 8
2016	Pyaar Tune Kya Kiya	Ayushaaz Khan	Season 7; Episode 9
2016	Mann Mein Vishwas Hai	Aryan Shashtri	Episodic Role
2019	Jaat Na Poocho Prem Ki	Arjun Mishra	
2020	Shakti – Astitva Ke Ehsaas Ki	Soham Singh	
2021–2023	Sasural Simar Ka 2	Aarav Oswal	

=== Guest appearance ===
Year	Title	Role
2021	Udaariyaan	Aarav Oswal
2021	Sirf Tum	Aarav Oswal

=== Web series ===
Year	Title	Role
2019	Panchali	Kshite
2020	Ratri Ke Yatri	Rudra Kapoor

== Awards ==
Year	Award	Category	Work	Result
2009	Indian Telly Awards	Best Child Artiste (Male)	Balika Vadhu	Won
2010	Gold Awards	Best Child Artist (Male)	Balika Vadhu	Won
