= Nazea Hasan Sayed =

Indian actress

- Born: Mumbai, India, 23 September 1990
- Occupations: Actress, Model
- Years active: 2007–present

Nazea Hasan Sayed is an Indian actress and model. She is best known for her work in daily soaps like Mahabharat, Dahleez, Lockdown Ki Love Story and Ek Nayi Pehchan.

== Career ==
She came into the limelight for her work in the series Aladdin (Kid Show), which was aired on Zee TV in 2007. She became popular for her work in Punar Vivah - Ek Nayi Umeed. She made her debut as an actress in the Bollywood movie Once Upon a Time in Mumbai Dobaara!, which was released in 2013. She also appeared in Mahabharat and Dahleez where she played the role of Vrushali and Simmi respectively. she played the role of Tanu Goel in Lockdown Ki Love Story which is produced by Rashmi Sharma telefims.presently working for &tv baalshiv as goddess Saraswati with Rishabh

== Filmography ==
- Aladdin as Princess Jasmine
- CID - Many episodics.
- Punar Vivah - Ek Nayi Umeed as Sheela
- Ekk Nayi Pehchaan as Shanaya (Padmini Kolhapure Daughter)
- Mahabharat as Vrushali
- Dahleez as Simmi Ahuja
- Lockdown Ki Love Story as Tanu Goel
- Once Upon A Time In Mumbai Dobaara
- Ebn-e-Batuta as Bubbly
- Devi Adi Parashakti as Mohini
- Anbe Vaa as Mohana Lakshminarayanan
- Tulsidham Ke Laddu Gopal as Yashoda
- Adaalat episode 272---as Zenia
