= Sehban Azim =

Indian television actor

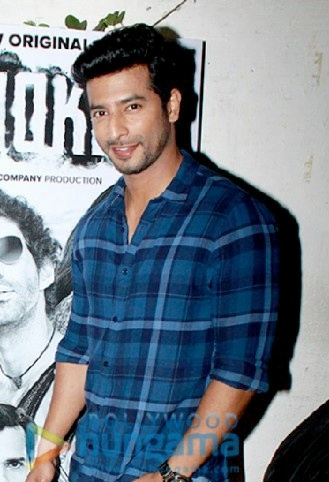
- Sehban Azim at the success bash of the web series Smoke
- Born: 26 February 1986 (age 40); Delhi, India
- Education: Dayal Singh College
- Occupation: Actor
- Years active: 2008–present
- Known for: Tujhse Hai Raabta

Sehban Azim (born 26 February 1986) is an Indian television actor, having worked in TV shows like Dill Mill Gayye, Ek Hazaaron Mein Meri Behna Hai, Humsafars, Thapki Pyar Ki, Bepannaah and Tujhse Hai Raabta.

== Early life and education ==
Born in Delhi to a writer mother and painter father Abdul, Azim did studentship at Dyal Singh College (Delhi). During college days he did small jobs like promoter or coordinator.

== Personal life ==
Azim moved to Mumbai to pursue his acting career. He is a poet as well. He's a practicing Muslim.

== Media ==
The Times 20 Most Desirable Men on Television
| Ranking | Year | Ref |
|---|---|---|
| 10th | 2018 | |
| 19th | 2019 | |
| 14th | 2020 | |

== Filmography ==
=== Films ===
| Year | Title | Role | Notes | Ref. |
|---|---|---|---|---|
| 2008 | Stations | Unknown | Cameo | |
| 2008 | Karma | Rocky | | |
| 2010 | Tequila Nights | Unknown | | |
| 2012 | 64 Panne | Unknown | | |
| 2018 | Have You Met You | Karan Wahi | Short film | |
| 2019 | Banjar | Unknown | Short film | |
| 2020 | Soulsathi | Rajat | Short film | |
| TBA | Jaageer | | Filming | |

=== Television ===
| Year | Title | Role | Notes | Ref. |
|---|---|---|---|---|
| 2009–2010 | Dill Mill Gayye | Dr. Yuvraj Oberoi | | |
| 2012–2013 | Ek Hazaaron Mein Meri Behna Hai | Karan Singh Shekhawat | | |
| 2013 | Yeh Hai Aashiqui | Neel | Season 1; Episode 14 | |
| 2013 | Dil Dosti Dance | Aditya Khurana | | |
| 2014 | Pyaar Ka The End | Suraj Sharma | | |
| 2014–2015 | Humsafars | Zaki Chaudhary | | |
| 2015 | Pyaar Tune Kya Kiya | Karan Singh | | |
| 2015 | MTV Webbed | Rohit Kapoor | | |
| 2016 | Silsila Pyaar Ka | Akshay Singh Bansal | | |
| 2016 | Yeh Hai Aashiqui | Nick | Season 4; Episode 12 | |
| 2016–2017 | Thapki Pyar Ki | Kabir Katyal | | |
| 2017 | Udaan | Inspector Ajay Khurana | | |
| 2018 | Bepannaah | Yash Arora | | |
| 2018–2021 | Tujhse Hai Raabta | ACP Malhar Rane | | |
| 2018–2021 | Tujhse Hai Raabta | Shera Choudhary | Cameo | |
| 2019 | Kitchen Champion | Himself/Contestant | Episode 22 | |
| 2022 | Spy Bahu | Yohan Nanda | | |

=== Web series ===
| Year | Title | Role | Notes | Ref. |
|---|---|---|---|---|
| 2023 | Dear Ishq | Abhimanyu Razdan | | |
| 2024 | Tera Ishq Mera Fitoor | Raghav | | |

=== Music videos ===
| Year | Title | Singer(s) | Ref. |
|---|---|---|---|
| 2018 | Main Tenu Samjhawan (Reprise) | Pawni Pandey | |
| 2020 | Yaad Aayega | Abhay Jodhpurkar, R. Naaz | |
| 2022 | Jeev Jhala Mogra | Chinmay Hulyalkar, Sayee Gangan | |
| 2022 | Minnatein | Mohammed Irfan | |
| 2022 | Ishq Paudiyan | Mohammed Irfan | |
