= Tanya Sharma =

Indian television actress (born 1995)

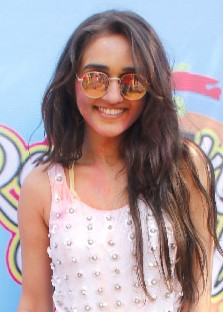
- Tanya Sharma at Holi Invasion party 2018
- Born: 27 September 1995 (age 30); Delhi, India
- Occupations: Actress; Model
- Years active: 2011–Present
- Known for: Saath Nibhaana Saathiya; Sasural Simar Ka 2

Tanya Sharma (born 27 September 1995) is an Indian television actress. She is known for portraying the lead characters in Saath Nibhaana Saathiya and Sasural Simar Ka 2.

== Career ==
=== Early struggles (2011–14) ===
Sharma made her television debut in Afsar Bitiya (2011–2012), playing the role of Chanchal Raj. It was followed by the mythological drama Devon Ke Dev...Mahadev, where she was cast as Devasena, and Fear Files in an episodic appearance but these roles failed to get her wider acclaim.

=== Rise to success (2015–present) ===
Sharma went to have her breakthrough role as Meera Modi, the new generation lead in Rashmi Sharma's most successful long-running StarPlus soap opera Saath Nibhaana Saathiya from 2015 to 2017.

In 2018, she starred in Zee TV show Woh Apna Sa as Binni Jindal. She featured in three different standalone episodes of &TV popular anthology drama Laal Ishq in different characters.

In February 2019, Sharma got her second big role when she was finalized to play Saanvi "Anjor" Rajvanshi in Colors TV's social drama Udaan.

== Television ==
Year	Title	Role	Notes	Ref.
2011–2012	Afsar Bitiya	Chanchal Raj		
2012–2014	Devon Ke Dev...Mahadev	Devasena		
2013	Fear Files	Varsha		
2013–2014	It's Complicated: Relationships Ka Naya Status	Urvashi		
2014	Yeh Hai Aashiqui	Unknown		
2015–2017	Saath Nibhaana Saathiya	Meera Modi Suryavanshi		
2017	Aye Zindagi	Vaidehi	Episodic Role	
2018	Woh Apna Sa	Binni Jindal		
2018	Kaun Hai?	Akshita	Episode 24: "The Curse Of Bhanumati"	
2018	Laal Ishq	Radhika	Episode 20: "Ateet"	
2019	Laal Ishq	Harni/Akansha	Episode 47: "Khooni Rishta"	
2019	Laal Ishq	Anvesha	Episode 165: "Khooni Gudda"	
2019	Udaan	Saanvi "Anjor" Rajvanshi		
2020–2021	Qurbaan Hua	Kashmeera	Recurring role	
2021–2023	Sasural Simar Ka 2	Reema Narayan Oswal / Chhaya the spirit		
2026	Oh Humnava Tum Dena Saath Mera	Ira		

=== Web series ===
Year	Title	Role	Notes	Ref
2025	Jackpot			
