= Sasural Simar Ka 2 =

Indian television series

- Genre: Drama; Supernatural; Horror fiction
- Created by: Martin Lowe
- Written by: Jay Verma
- Screenplay by: Gautam Hegde; Shilpa D'Mello; Fatema Rangila; Shubham Joshi; Dialogues: Khushbu Shrivastav; Aanchal Aggarwal Vasani
- Directed by: Yash Sinha
- Starring: Radhika Muthukumar; Avinash Mukherjee; Tanya Sharma; Karan Sharma; Jayati Bhatia
- Composer: Nishant-Raja
- Country of origin: India
- Original language: Hindi
- No. of seasons: 2
- No. of episodes: 629

Production
- Producers: Rashmi Sharma; Pawan Kumar Marut
- Cinematography: Danny S
- Editor: Suraj Singh
- Camera setup: Multi-camera
- Running time: 20–35 minutes
- Production company: Rashmi Sharma Telefilms

Original release
- Network: Colors TV
- Release: 26 April 2021 – 7 April 2023

Related
- Sasural Simar Ka

Sasural Simar Ka 2 (transl. Simar's In-Laws 2) is an Indian Hindi-language television series that aired from 26 April 2021 to 7 April 2023 on Colors TV. It is a sequel to the 2011 soap opera Sasural Simar Ka. Produced by Rashmi Sharma Telefilms, it stars Radhika Muthukumar, Avinash Mukherjee, Tanya Sharma, Karan Sharma, and Jayati Bhatia.

== Plot ==
Set in Agra, the story revolves around Simar Narayan and Reema Narayan, two sisters with different personalities. While Simar dreams of becoming a singer, Reema aspires to be a model. Aarav Oswal and Vivaan Oswal are cousins who love and respect each other. They fall for Reema, but Simar falls for Aarav. Reema is chosen to be Aarav's bride but leaves on the wedding day for an event for her modeling career. Because of this, Simar has to marry instead of her sister, but the Oswal family does not accept her as a daughter-in-law .Then Rima and Vivan held a wedding without telling anyone. After a lot of twists and turns, the Oswal family and Geetanjali Devi (Badi Maa) finally accept Simar as their daughter-in-law.

However, Simar and Aarav's relationship is jeopardised when Aarav's old friend Dhami enters their lives. Dhami is obsessed with Aarav and claims to be his first wife. It turns out that Dhami is mentally unstable and she drugs Aarav to marry her. Simar tries to expose Dhami but all her plans backfire. On Geetanjali Devi birthday, Dhami shows a picture of Gopichand Oswal (Geetanjali Devi late husband) and his second wife who is actually Simar's music teacher, Yamini. Simar leaves her musical career for Geetanjali Devi. Dhami decides to commit suicide with Aarav. However, Simar saves Aarav, while Dhami died after falling off the cliff.

Reema leaves The Oswal's mansion to complete her modeling career. However, when she returns, she starts acting strangely. Simar worried about Reema's behaviour. She decides to investigate and finds out that Reema has been captured by a yaksh named Rudra, and the one pretending to be Reema is actually Chhaya, her lookalike and Rudra's wife. Simar frees Reema and brings her back. However, it turns out that Chhaya had swapped places with Reema. Rudra learns that Simar is the reincarnation of Rani Yakshini Damini, the most powerful yakshini. Rudra tries everything to prevent Simar from remembering her past and attaining the power of Damini. However Simar gains the power and kills Rudra.

On their first wedding anniversary, Aarav wants to gift Simar something special. He saw a bangle which was in a statue's hand. The statue has a burn mark on it so no one was willing to buy it. However, Aarav likes it. The statue turned out to be cursed. It killed everyone one who hated it. Reema knows about this after some research that the statue was made by a man named Arindam, who was the heir of a famous Bengali family, The Roy Chaudary's. Arindam was in love with a maid named Labuni. However, The Roy Chaudary's refused their relationship and threw Labuni into fire. Labuni escaped but her face was scarred. Arindam had made a statue similar to Labuni and now Labuni's soul resides in the statue looking for someone who would love her despite the scar on her face. The man happened to be Aarav, and Labuni plotted to marry him to become alive. Labuni tries everything she can to marry Aarav. However, Simar manages to burn the statue. Labuni returns in her human form to marry Aarav. She becomes Geetanjali's maid and frames Simar for a murder. Aarav proves Simar is innocence and kills Labuni. Arindam, who falls for Simar, along with his grandmother and Dulba plan to bring back the dead Choudhary family souls into the bodies of the Oswal family but end up being defeated, thanks to Simar.

Gajendra (Aarav's father) had a daughter named Masoomi, from his girlfriend before his marriage with Sandhya (Aarav's mother). He had been raising her secretly in an orphanage for 25 years. A priest told Geetanjali Devi about a sin committed by one of the family members. To repent for the "sin", Geetanjali Devi distributes food to an orphanage which happens to be the same orphanage where Masoomi stays. Gajendra's truth comes out and everyone hates him except Simar. Masoomi overhears the conversation between Gajendra, Simar and Aarav. She learns about her father and runs away after Gajendra says that he will leave Masoomi for his wife and children. Masoomi meets Sandhya on the road who brings her to The Oswal's Mansion. Sandhya becomes heart-broken after learning the truth and keeps her distance from Gajendra. Masoomi accuses Aarav of snatching her happiness by stealing her father. Simar visits the orphanage to learn more about Masoomi. She learned that Masoomi had a twin sister named Gunjan who had died. Charulata (Gunjan and Masoomi's mother and Gajendra's ex-girlfriend) is a witch. She summons Gunjan's spirit to avenge The Oswals. However, Simar manages to defeat them. But Gunjan already orders a Naag to disguise as Aarav.

The Naag possess Aarav's body to live longer. Simar manages to kill the Naag and free Aarav. However, Naag's wife, Nazar returns to seek revenge. She murders Sandhya. Simar performs a ritual to protect their house from any evil spirit. Nazar manages to break that protection and tricks Aarav into believing that they slept together. Simar reveals to the family that she is pregnant. Many months pass and Nazar enters the house also revealing to everyone that she is also expecting Aarav's child. Simar breaks down on this revelation and goes into labour pain. Nazar too stars experiencing labour pain. A Baba tells Geetanjali Devi that if Simar's child is born between 4:00–4:07 pm then that child will be the cause of Simar's death. Simar gives birth to a daughter at 4:06 pm. Nazar gives birth to a daughter as well and named her Amrit. Aarav snatches away Simar's daughter revealing that she is bad luck. However, Simar makes it clear that if her daughter is being thrown then she will also leave the house. It is revealed that Nazar exchanged the babies. She feels confident that she snatched everything from Aarav and Simar and permanently separated them. To her shock, this was a plan of Simar and Aarav and they successfully acquire their daughter from her when Nazar thought that now no one can challenge her. Nazar, held captive, reveals it to everyone that Aarav is not Amrit's father, but her Naag Devta (Snake God) gave her a blessing and made her pregnant. Nazar is burnt to death. Simar names her daughter Disha and adopts Amrit. The family accepts the babies and they are happily reunited.

== Cast ==
=== Main ===
- Radhika Muthukumar as:
  - Simar "Choti Simar" Narayan Oswal: A singer; Indu and Avinash's youngest daughter (2021–2023)
  - Rani Yakshini Damini: Simar's previous birth; a yakshini (2022)
- Avinash Mukherjee as:
  - Aarav Oswal: Sandhya and Gajendra's son (2021–2023)
  - Raja Dev Singh: Aarav's past life (2022)
  - Naag: An ichchaddari naag who possessed in Aarav's body (2023)
- Tanya Sharma as:
  - Reema Narayan Oswal: Indu and Avinash's second daughter (2021–2023)
  - Chhaya Rathore: A soul; Reema's doppelganger (2022)
- Karan Sharma as Vivaan Oswal: Chitra and Giriraj's elder son (2021–2023)
- Jayati Bhatia as:
  - Geetanjali Devi "Badi Maa" Oswal: The matriarch of Oswal family (2021–2023)
  - Nirmala Devi "Mataji" Bharadwaj: The matriarch of Bharadwaj family (2021) (Cameo from Season 1)

=== Recurring ===
==== Narayans ====
- Shakti Singh as Professor Avinash Narayan: Indu's husband (2021–2022)
- Anita Kulkarni as Indu Narayan: Avinash's wife (2021–2022)
- Akash Jagga / Rupesh Kotwani as Gagan Narayan: Indu and Avinash's son (2021–2022) / (2023)
- Shubhanshi Raghuwanshi as Aditi Oswal Narayan: Sandhya and Gajendra's daughter (2021–2023)

==== Oswals ====
- Adi Irani as Gopichand Oswal: Geetanjali and Yamini's late husband (2021) (Dead)
- Aarav Chowdhary as Gajendra Oswal: Geetanjali and Gopichand's elder son (2021–2023)
- Shital Thakkar / Moon Banerjee as Sandhya Oswal: Gajendra's wife (2021–2022) / (2023) (Dead)
- Kajal Pisal as Charulata: A witch; Gajendra's ex-lover (2023) (Dead)
- Payal Bhojwani as:
  - Gunjan Oswal: Charulata and Gajendra's daughter (2023) (Dead)
  - Masoomi Oswal: Charulata and Gajendra's daughter (2023)
- Rajeev Paul as Giriraj Oswal: Geetanjali and Gopichand's younger son (2021–2023)
- Vibha Bhagat as Chitra Oswal: Giriraj's wife (2021–2023)
- Rakshit Wahi as Reyansh Oswal: Chitra and Giriraj's younger son (2021)/(2022–2023)
- Neha Harsora as Kavya Oswal: Reyansh's wife (2022)
- Dolphin Dwivedi Dubey as Yamini Devi Oswal: A classical singer; Gopichand's second widow (2021–2022)
- Sumit Bhardwaj as Samar Oswal: Gopichand and Yamini's adoptive son (2021–2022)

==== Kashyaps ====
- Avinash Sahijwani as Dr. Rajendra Kashyap: Shobha's husband (2021–2022)
- Leena Prabhu as Shobha Oswal Kashyap: Geetanjali and Gopichand's daughter (2021–2022)
- Wasim Mushtaq as Lalit Kashyap: Shobha and Rajendra's elder son (2021–2022)
- Shubhangi Tambale as Roma Narayan Kashyap: Indu and Avinash's eldest daughter (2021–2022)
- Prithvi Tanwar as Vivek Kashyap: Shobha and Rajendra's younger son (2021–2022)

==== Kapoors ====
- Krishna Soni as Karan Kapoor: Pallavi's husband (2022)
- Heena Soni as Pallavi Kapoor: Karan's wife (2022)
- Nishi Singh as Ishita "Ishu" Kapoor: Karan and Pallavi's daughter (2022)

==== Rathores ====
- Arina Dey as Kamakshi Rathore: A yakshini; Rudra and Mayakshi's mother (2022)
- Ashish Kapoor / Kapil Arya as Rudra Rathore: A yaksh; Chhaya's husband (2022) / (2022)
- Farah Lakhani as Mayakshi Rathore: A yakshini; Rudra's younger sister (2022)

==== Others ====
- Salman Shaikh as Devesh Agarwal: Reema's photographer who create many problems in Reema's life for his revenge. (2021)
- Kamal Ghimiral as Surinder Gupta: Oswal's business associate (2021)
- Sneha Tomar as Kajal Gupta: Surinder's daughter (2021)
- Giriraj Kabra as Mohit: A local goon; Aditi's ex-fiancé (2021–2022)
- Kamal Malik as Rana: Mohit's father (2022)
- Nidhi Bhavsar as Radhika: Gagan's prospective bride (2022)
- Sheel Verma as Mayank: Aditi's ex-husband (2022)
- Sonam Arora as Bhavna: A brothel owner (2022)
- Krutika Desai as Dhami Kapoor: Aarav's psycho friend turned fake wife (2022) (Dead)
- Manish Arora as Doctor (2022)
- Sonam Lamba as Labuni: An evil statue who tried to marry Aarav to become alive. (2022) (Dead)
- Krishnakant Singh Bundela as Baba Ji (2022) (Dead)
- Kaveri Ghosh as Guru Maa (2022) (Dead)
- Vishal Bharadwaj as Arindam: Labuni's love interest (2022–2023)
- Dubroo Clown as Joker: The evil soft toy; Arindam's friend (2022–2023)
- Benazir Shaikh as Tara: A witch; Charulata's friend (2023)
- Tushar Kawale as Suraj: Fake Aarav (2023)
- Shraddha Jaiswal as Nazar: An ichchaddari naagin; Naag's wife (2023) (Dead)

=== Guest appearances ===
- Dipika Kakar as Simar Bharadwaj: Prem's wife (2021)
- Vivian Dsena as Ranveer Oberoi from Sirf Tum (2021)
- Jaya Prada as Herself (2022)
- Eisha Singh as Suhani Sharma from Sirf Tum (2022)

== Production ==
=== Casting ===
Via first promo, Dipika Kakar was confirmed to be reprising her role of Simar Bhardwaj. Later it was revealed to be a cameo role of 50 episodes. Jayati Bhatia was signed to play her role as Mataji in cameo and play a new role of Geetanjali Devi Oswal (Badi Maa). Avinash Mukherjee, Tanya Sharma, Radhika Muthukumar and Karan Sharma were selected for new leads.

Aarav Chowdhary, Sheetal Thakkar, Vibha Bhagat, Rakshit Wahi, Rajeev Paul, Leena Prabhu, Anita Kulkarni, Akash Jagga, Shakti Singh and Shubhangi Tambale were cast for recurring roles of the show. Rakshit Wahi quit the show in 2021 but came back in June 2022. In March 2022, Jaya Prada to join as a cameo for Gajendra and Sandhya's wedding anniversary. Wasim Mushtaq quit the show in April 2022. In August 2022, the storyline changed to a supernatural fantasy genre, just like in the first season.

=== Filming ===
Set against the backdrop of Agra, the series is mainly filmed at the sets in Naigaon, Maharashtra. In April, May and June 2021, several sequences were shot near the Taj Mahal in Agra due to the lockdown in Maharashtra. Filming of the series began on 19 March 2021 and ended on 5 April 2023.

=== Release ===
The pilot episode was released on April 26, 2021, 10 years after the release date of the first season. It aired from Monday to Saturday at 6:30 pm. From 22 August 2022, its slot shifted to 6 pm and Saavi Ki Savaari started airing at the previous slot.

=== Cancellation ===
The show went off air on 7 April 2023 due to dropping TRPs, and the makers did not want to move the story forward.
