= NRI =

NRI or Nri may refer to:

- Kingdom of Nri, an Igbo kingdom that flourished between the 10th century and early 20th century
- National Radio Institute, a now defunct post-secondary vocational correspondence school
- National Resources Inventory
- Needham Research Institute
- Networked Readiness Index
- Nomura Research Institute
- Non-resident Indian
- Non-roster invitee
- Norepinephrine reuptake inhibitor
