= Gud Se Meetha Ishq =

Indian drama television series

- Genre: Drama
- Starring: Pankhuri Awasthy Rode; Meera Deosthale; Ishhan Dhawan; Arhaan Behll
- Opening theme: Gud Se Meetha Ishq by Sujatha Mohan, Sonu Nigam and Anuradha Sriram
- Country of origin: India
- Original language: Hindi
- No. of seasons: 1
- No. of episodes: 130

Production
- Producers: Pintoo Guha; Rupali Guha
- Running time: 20-24 minutes
- Production company: Film Farm India

Original release
- Network: Star Bharat
- Release: 18 April – 1 October 2022

Related
- Jol Nupur

Gud Se Meetha Ishq (transl. Love Is Sweeter Than Jaggery) is an Indian Hindi-language drama television series that premiered on 18 April 2022 on Star Bharat and digitally on Disney+ Hotstar. Produced by Film Farm India as an official remake of Star Jalsha's Bengali series Jol Nupur, it stars Pankhuri Awasthy Rode, Meera Deosthale, Ishhan Dhawan, and Arhaan Behll. It went off air on 1 October 2022.

== Plot ==
Kajal is a shy girl who is a travel guide and works under Phool Singh. She lives with her mother and is often questioned about her father's absence. Neel, is a free-spirited photographer who lives life on his own terms and is close to his family and his sister Paridhi. Pari is a special child, the eldest child in her family who needs special care. She is often scolded by her uncle for her irresponsible behaviour and labelled mental.

The show traces their lives. Circumstances causes Neel to marry Kajal. However, Neel's father and his family do not approve of their relationship. It shows how Pari plays an important role in Kajal and Neel's acceptance.

== Cast ==
=== Main ===
- Pankhuri Awasthy Rode as Kajal "Kaju" Khurana (née Bhatt): Surya and Pallavi's daughter; Neel's wife
- Ishhan Dhawan as Neel Khurana: Jaydeep and Sonia's son; Ritika's brother; Pavitra's former boyfriend; Kaju's husband
- Meera Deosthale as Paridhi "Pari" Shergill (née Khurana): Nutan and Rajat's daughter; Dhruv's sister; Dev's wife; Noor's stepmother
- Arhaan Behll as Dev Shergill: Navdeep's brother; Chandni's former husband; Pari's music teacher and husband; Noor's father; Neel's friend; Kaju's sworn brother

=== Recurring ===
- Sakshi Sharma as Pavitra Bhalla: Rajendra's daughter; Neel's former girlfriend
- Amrapali Gupta as Chhavi Rawat: Pallavi's sister; Satyakam's wife; Bhoomi's mother
- Patrali Chattopadhyay as Bhoomi Rawat Khurana: Satyakam and Chhavi's daughter; Dhruv's wife
- Vishal Chaudhary as Dhruv Khurana: Nutan and Rajat's son; Pari's brother; Bhoomi's husband
- Rajoshi Vidyarthi as Pallavi Bhatt: Chhavi's sister; Surya's wife; Kajal's mother
- Sudesh Berry as Satyakam Rawat: Chhavi's husband; Bhoomi's father
- Ananya Khare as Nutan Khurana: Rajat's wife; Pari and Dhruv's mother
- Jaya Ojha as Sonia Khurana: Jaydeep's wife; Neel and Ritika's mother
- Vicky Ahuja as Rajat Khurana: Nutan's husband; Pari and Dhruv's father
- Sunil Singh as Advocate Jaydeep "JD" Khurana: Sonia's husband; Neel and Ritika's father
- Prabhleen Sandhu as Ritika "Ritu" Khurana: Jaydeep and Sonia's daughter; Neel's sister
- Susheel Parashar as Mr. Khurana: Rajat and Jaydeep's father; Neel, Pari and Dhruv and Ritika's grandfather
- Akshita Arora as Mrs Khurana: Rajat and Jaydeep's mother; Neel, Pari, Dhruv and Ritika's grandmother
- Ishita Ganguly as Chandni: Nimrit's younger sister; Dev's ex-wife; Noor's mother
- Jasveer Kaur as Nimrit Shergill: Chandni's elder sister; Navdeep's wife; Bunty's mother
- Ayub Khan as Navdeep Shergill: Dev's brother; Nimrit's husband; Bunty's father
- Shivika Rishi as Noor Shergill: Dev and Chandni's daughter; Pari's stepdaughter
- Shubham Pamecha as Bunty Shergill: Navdeep and Nimrit's son
- Rishi Khurana as Phool Singh: Kajal's boss-turned-obsessive lover
- Shantanu Monga as Madhur Sharma: Pari's prospective groom
- Sagar Saini as Advocate Rajendra Kumar Bhalla: Pavitra's father
- Sharanpreet Matharoo as Mrs. Bhalla: Pavitra's mother

== Production ==
=== Casting ===
Pankhuri Awasthy Rode was cast to portray the lead role of a tourist guide. Ishhan Dhawan was cast as a photographer opposite Rode.

Meera Deosthale was cast as the other lead, in the role of a mentally challenged girl. Arhaan Behll was cast opposite Deosthale.

Vishal Chaudhary was roped in to play Dhawan and Deosthale's brother. Sudesh Berry was cast in a prominent role. Ananya Khare was roped in to portray Deosthale's mother.

=== Filming ===
The series is set in Delhi. It is mainly shot at the Film City, Mumbai. The shooting of the series began in March 2022. Some initial scenes were shot in Lakhamandal.

=== Cancellation ===
Gud Se Meetha Ishq went off air on 1 October 2022, due to low viewership.

== Adaptations ==
Language	Title	Premiere date	Network(s)	Last aired	Notes
Bengali	Jol Nupur জল নূপুর	21 January 2013	Star Jalsha	5 December 2015	Original
Hindi	Gud Se Meetha Ishq गुड़ से मीठा इश्क	18 April 2022	Star Bharat	1 October 2022	Remake
Hindi	Jhanak 1 झनक 1	20 November 2023	StarPlus	8 June 2025	Remake
