= Ekroop Bedi =

Indian television actress

- Born: 1 January 1996 (age 30); Delhi, India
- Other names: Roop
- Occupation: Actress
- Years active: 2011-present
- Known for: Suhani Si Ek Ladki; Shakti – Astitva Ke Ehsaas Ki
- Height: 163 cm (5 ft 4 in)
- Spouse: Harmeet Jolly (m. 2018)

Ekroop Bedi is an Indian television actress, who has appeared in Hindi television series, like Suhani Si Ek Ladki, Dharampatni, Rab Se Sohna Isshq, and Bani – Ishq Da Kalma. She was seen in Star Plus's Koi Laut Ke Aaya Hai. Sony tv's "Peshwa Bajirao" and is currently seen on Color TV's Shakti – Astitva Ke Ehsaas Ki.

== Personal life ==
On 12 December 2018, Bedi became engaged to and on 17 December 2018, married Harmeet Jolly.

== Television ==
Year	Title	Role	Channel
2011	Dharampatni	Hansika	Imagine TV
2012	Rab Se Sohna Isshq	Roop	Zee TV
2013	Bani – Ishq Da Kalma	Kookie Singh Mann	Colors TV
2014	Suhani Si Ek Ladki	Gauri Aditya Shivasthav	Star Plus
2014	Baal Veer	Vigyan Pari	Sony SAB
2015	Agent Raghav – Crime Branch	Alpana	&TV
2016	Kuch Rang Pyar Ke Aise Bhi	Tina	Sony TV
2016	Vishkanya Ek Anokhi Prem Kahani	Yakshini/Laila	Zee TV
2016	Chandra Nandni	Kinnari	Star Plus
2017	Koi Laut Ke Aaya Hai	Chanda	Star Plus
2017	Peshwa Bajirao	Bhiubai Ghorpade	Sony TV
2018	Kaleerein	Nimmo Dhingra	Zee TV
2020–2021	Shakti – Astitva Ke Ehsaas Ki	Gurwinder Daljeet Singh	Colors TV
