= Rohit Chandel =

Indian television actor (born 1995)

- Born: 26 September 1995 (age 31); Shahada, Maharashtra, India
- Occupation: Actor
- Years active: 2014–present
- Known for: Kashibai Bajirao Ballal; Pandya Store

Rohit Chandel (born 26 September 1995) is an Indian television actor who is best known for playing Baji Rao in Kashibai Bajirao Ballal and Dhawal Makwana in Pandya Store.

== Early life ==
Rohit Chandel was born on 26 September 1995 to Rajendra Chandel and Nanda Chandel in Shahada, Maharashtra.

== Career ==
Chandel made his acting debut in a commercial advertisement after getting rejected in 90 auditions. In 2014, Chandel made his television debut in BIG Magic series Har Mushkil Ka Hal Akbar Birbal in a minor role. Later, he appeared in various Hindi series in several significant roles.

In 2022, he played the lead role of Baji Rao in Kashibai Bajirao Ballal. From 2023 to 2024, he is seen playing the lead role of Dhawal Makwana in Pandya Store opposite Priyanshi Yadav. In June 2026, he was signed to portray Ishaan Ganguly in musical romance show Sairaab but in July 2026 he was replaced by the makers following his arrest in POCSO Case.

== Filmography ==
=== Television ===
Year(s)	Title	Role	Notes	Refs
2014	Har Mushkil Ka Hal Akbar Birbal	Boy 1	TV debut Cameo	
2015	Yam Hain Hum			
2016	Tamanna	Imran		
2017	Akbar Rakht Se Takht Ka Safar	Sultan Kasim		
2018	Yeh Un Dinon Ki Baat Hai	Rohan Somani		
2019	Vikram Betaal Ki Rahasya Gatha	Babruvahana		
2019	Chandragupta Maurya	Ambhikumar		
2019	Shakti – Astitva Ke Ehsaas Ki	Gurmeet "Garry" Singh		
2021–2022	Kashibai Bajirao Ballal	Baji Rao		
2023–2024	Pandya Store	Dhawal Makwana		
2026	Sairaab	Ishaan Ganguly		

=== Films ===
Year(s)	Title	Role	Language	Notes	Refs
2010	Arcadia Lost	Himself	English		
2016	The American Gandhi	Himself	English		
2025	Ryder	Raj	English		
2026	Blind Game	Vicky	Hindi		

=== Web series ===
Year(s)	Title	Role	Notes	Refs
2022	Escaype Live	Rajkumar/Meena Kumari		

== See also ==
- List of Indian actors
- List of Indian television actors
