= Meera Deosthale =

Indian television actress (born 1995)

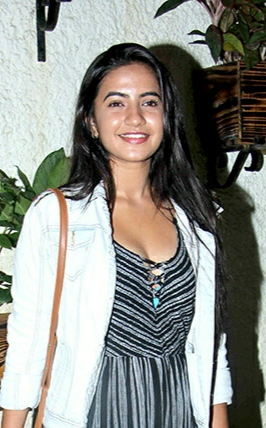
- Deosthale in 2018
- Born: 16 November 1995 (age 30); Vadodara, Gujarat, India
- Occupation: Actress
- Years active: 2014–present
- Known for: Udaan; Gud Se Meetha Ishq; Kuch Reet Jagat Ki Aisi Hai

Meera Deosthale (born 16 November 1995) is an Indian actress who primarily works in Hindi television. Deosthale is best known for playing Chakor Singh Rajvanshi in Udaan, for which she won a Gold Award. She is also known for playing Paridhi "Pari" Khurana Shergill in Gud Se Meetha Ishq and Nandini "Nandu" Naren Ratansi in Kuch Reet Jagat Ki Aisi Hai.

== Early life ==
Deosthale was born on 16 November 1995 in Vadodara, Gujarat. While in school, Deosthale was a state-level basketball player and focused on sports, later moving to Mumbai with her mother when she developed an interest in being an actress and finished school.

== Career ==
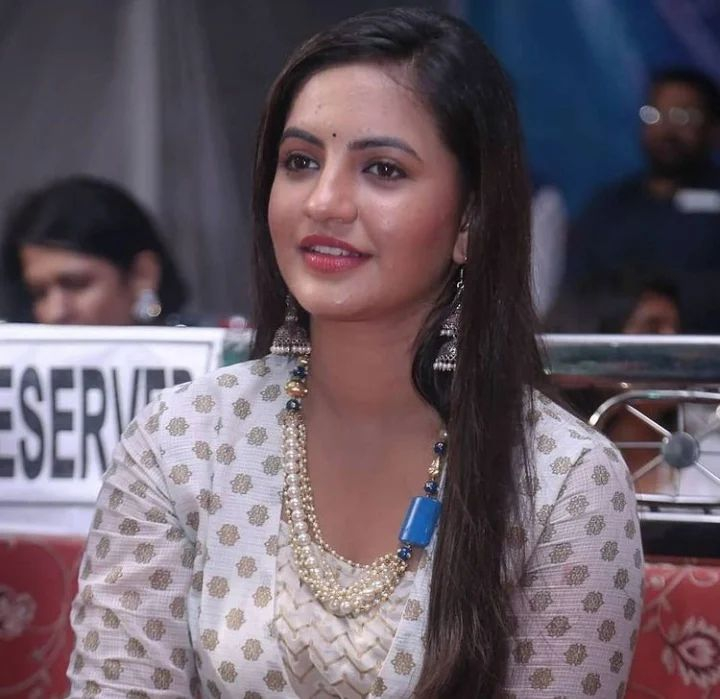
Deosthale at an event in 2016

Deosthale made her acting debut in 2014 with Sasural Simar Ka, where she played Priya Malik. In 2015, she first played Riya in Zindagi Wins and then appeared as Eshwari Thakur in Dilli Wali Thakur Gurls.

From 2016 to 2019, Deosthale played Chakor Singh Rajvanshi opposite Vijayendra Kumeria in Udaan. The show proved to be a turning point in her career and earned her a Gold Award. She quit the show in March 2019.

From 2019 to 2020, she played Vidya Singh in Vidya, opposite Namish Taneja. It went off air abruptly in March 2020 due to COVID-19 pandemic. In 2022, she played Paridhi Khurana in Gud Se Meetha Ishq, opposite Arhaan Behll. In the same year, she played Sweety, opposite Sharad Malhotra, in her web debut Ratri Ke Yatri 2.

From February 2024 to May 2024, Deosthale played the role of Nandini "Nandu" Naren Ratansi in Kuch Reet Jagat Ki Aisi Hai opposite Zaan Khan.

== Filmography ==
=== Television ===
Year	Title	Role	Notes	Ref.
2014	Sasural Simar Ka	Priya Malik		
2014–2015	Box Cricket League	Contestant	Season 1	
2015	Zindagi Wins	Riya		
2015	Dilli Wali Thakur Gurls	Eshwari "Eshu" Thakur		
2016–2019	Udaan	Chakor Singh Rajvanshi		
2019	Kitchen Champion 5	Contestant		
2019	Khatra Khatra Khatra	Contestant		
2019–2020	Vidya	Vidya Singh		
2022	Gud Se Meetha Ishq	Paridhi "Pari" Khurana Shergill		
2024	Kuch Reet Jagat Ki Aisi Hai	Nandini "Nandu" Naren Ratansi		

==== Special appearances ====
Year	Title	Role	Ref.
2016	Swaragini – Jodein Rishton Ke Sur	Chakor Singh	
2016	Balika Vadhu	Chakor Singh	
2016	Comedy Nights Live	Chakor Singh	
2016	Comedy Nights Bachao	Chakor Singh	
2016	Bigg Boss 10	Chakor Singh	
2017	Shakti – Astitva Ke Ehsaas Ki	Chakor Singh	
2017	Entertainment Ki Raat	Chakor Singh	
2018	Tu Aashiqui	Chakor Singh	
2018	Ishq Mein Marjawan	Chakor Singh	
2018	Laado 2 – Veerpur Ki Mardani	Chakor Singh	
2018	Bepannah	Chakor Singh	
2018	Silsila Badalte Rishton Ka	Chakor Singh	
2019	Choti Sarrdaarni	Vidya Singh	
2020	Bigg Boss 13	Vidya Singh	
2020	Bahu Begum	Vidya Singh	

=== Web series ===
Year	Title	Role	Notes	Ref.
2022	Ratri Ke Yatri 2	Sweety	Episode: "Kanya Dosh"	
2026	Anakhee	Ruhi	YouTube Series	

=== Music videos ===
Year	Title	Singer(s)	Ref.
2021	Jhooti Jhooti Batiyaan	Rashmi Vartak, Vidyadhar Bhave	

== Awards and nominations ==
Year	Award	Category	Work	Result	Ref.
2018	Gold Awards	Best Actress in a Lead Role	Udaan	Nominated	
2018	Gold Awards	Stellar Performance of the Year - Female	Udaan	Won	
2022	Indian Television Academy Awards	Popular Actress (Drama)	Gud Se Meetha Ishq	Nominated	
