= Yeh Fitoor Tera =

Indian drama television series

- Genre: Drama; Romance
- Created by: Ved Raj
- Written by: Dialogue; Shivangi Singh
- Screenplay by: Bhavna Vyas
- Story by: Pavni Mehandiratta; Malavika Asthana
- Directed by: Arshad Khan
- Creative directors: Janhvi Aasthana; Sankalp Gala
- Starring: Debchandrima Singha Roy; Ishhan Dhawan
- Theme music composer: Amit Trivedi
- Opening theme: "Feel Banaate Hain" by Dridha; Lyrics: Geet Sagar
- Country of origin: India
- Original language: Hindi
- No. of seasons: 1
- No. of episodes: 107

Production
- Producer: Ved Raj
- Cinematography: Sarfaraz Meghani
- Editor: Shashank Singh
- Camera setup: Multi-camera
- Running time: 20 minutes
- Production company: Story Square Productions

Original release
- Network: StarPlus
- Release: 5 August 2026 – present

Yeh Fitoor Tera (transl. This Obsession Of Yours) is an Indian Hindi-language television romantic drama series that premiered on 5 August 2026 on Star Plus and streames digitally on JioHotstar. Produced by Ved Raj under Story Square Productions, the series stars Debchandrima Singha Roy and Ishhan Dhawan.

== Premise ==
A reclusive girl named Saumya who finds the courage to reclaim her life as she adjust to co-ed college life, after meeting Jeet, a free-spirited rebel. Their passionate love story unfolds against the backdrop of Prayagraj.

== Cast ==
=== Main ===
- Debchandrima Singha Roy as Soumya Mathur: Madhu and Anoop's daughter; Krish's sister; Jeet’s girlfriend (2026–present)
- Ishhan Dhawan as Jeet Saxena: Sakshi and Sanjeev's son; Neeta's stepson; Hridaan and Pakhi's half-brother; Soumya’s boyfriend (2026–present)

=== Recurring ===
- Farida Dadi as Mrs. Saxena: Sanjeev and Rajeev's mother; Jeet, Hridaan, Pakhi, Tanya and Pihu's grandmother (2026–present)
- Sanjeev Seth as Sanjeev Saxena: Sakshi's former lover; Neeta's husband; Jeet, Hridaan and Pakhi's father (2026–present)
- Resham Tipnis as Sakshi Saxena: Sanjeev's former lover; Jeet's mother (2026)
- Rinku Ghosh as Neeta Saxena: Sanjeev's wife; Hridaan and Pakhi's mother (2026–present)
- Arnav Maggo as Hridaan Saxena: Sanjeev and Neeta's son; Pakhi's brother; Jeet's half-brother (2026–present)
- Ishani Banerjee as Pakhi Saxena: Sanjeev and Neeta's daughter; Hridaan's sister; Jeet's half-sister (2026–present)
- Rahul Aliani as Rajeev Saxena: Sanjeev's brother; Shobha's husband; Tanya and Pihu's father (2026–present)
- Neha Narang as Shobha Saxena: Rajeev's wife; Tanya and Pihu's mother (2026–present)
- Prachi Sharma as Tanya Saxena: Rajeev and Shobha's elder daughter; Pihu's sister (2026-present)
- Nandini Karmarkar as Pihu Saxena: Rajeev and Shobha's younger daughter; Tanya's sister (2026–present)
- Indraneel Bhattacharya as Dr. Anoop Mathur: Roop's younger brother; Madhu's husband; Soumya and Krish's father (2026–present)
- Gunn Kansara as Madhu Mathur: Anoop's wife; Soumya and Krish's mother (2026–present)
- Mohit Duseja as Krish Mathur: Anoop and Madhu's son; Soumya's brother (2026–present)
- Aman Verma as Roop Mathur: Anoop's elder brother; Uma's husband; Saumya's abuser (2026)
- Khushi Rajpoot as Uma Mathur: Roop's wife (2026–present)
- Manas Mayekar as Vijay Saxena (2026–present)
- Renee Arora as Reva: Hridaan's love interest (2026–present)
- Rohit Sharma as Shaurya: Sonali's boyfriend (2026–present)

=== Guest Appearances ===
- Samiksha Jaiswal as Sunheri from Apsara

== Production ==
=== Release ===
In June 2026, StarPlus unveiled a teaser to introduce Yeh Fitoor Tera with Debchandrima Singha Roy and Ishhan Dhawan.

=== Casting ===
Debchandrima Singha Roy was selected to play Soumya. Ishhan Dhawan was confirmed to play Jeet. Mohit Duseja was cast as Krish. Aman Verma also confirmed join the series.

== Soundtrack ==
The title song of the series, Feel Banaate Hain was composed by National award winning music composer Amit Trivedi. The song is performed by playback singer Dridha while the lyrics were written by Geet Sagar. Trivedi revealed that that the song was inspired by today's reel making culture of Gen-Z vibe due to frequently referred to its viral hook line, "Chal Na Reel Banate Hain".

| No. | Title | Lyrics | Music | Singer(s) | Length |
|---|---|---|---|---|---|
| 1. | "Feel Banaate Hain" | Geet Sagar | Amit Trivedi | Dridha | 3:06 |
| Total length: | | | | | 3:06 |

== Awards and nominations ==
| Year | Award | Category | Nominee | Result | Ref |
|---|---|---|---|---|---|
| 2026 | Indian Television Academy Awards | Best Show Drama Jury | Yeh Fitoor Tera | Pending | |
| 2026 | Indian Television Academy Awards | Best Director Drama Jury | Arshad Khan | Pending | |
| 2026 | Indian Television Academy Awards | Best Show Drama Popular | Yeh Fitoor Tera | Pending | |
