= Kahaani Hamaaray Mahaabhaarat Ki =

Television series

- Written by: Mahesh Pandey; Manish Paliwal; Dr. Bodhaisaattva; Dialogues; Dheeraj Sarna
- Directed by: Garry Bhinder; Santram Varma; Talat Jani; Mujammil Desai
- Creative directors: Suraj Rao; Vikas Gupta
- Starring: See Below
- Opening theme: "Katha Mahaabhaarat Ki" by Daler Mehndi
- Country of origin: India
- Original language: Hindi
- No. of episodes: 75

Production
- Producers: Ekta Kapoor; Shobha Kapoor
- Cinematography: Mahesh Talkad; Shabbir Naik; Deepak Malwankar; Suhas Shirodkar
- Editors: Vikas Sharma; Vishal Sharma; Khursheed Rizvi; Prem Raaj; Rajiv Kumar Chanai
- Running time: 24 minutes
- Production company: Balaji Telefilms

Original release
- Network: 9X
- Release: 7 July – 6 November 2008

Kahaani Hamaaray Mahaabhaarat Ki is an Indian mythological television drama series on 9X based on the Sanskrit epic Mahabharata.

It aired from 7 July 2008 to 6 November 2008. The series was produced by Ekta Kapoor and Shobha Kapoor under their banner Balaji Telefilms.

== Plot ==
It's a dynastic struggle for the throne of Hastinapur, the kingdom ruled by the Kuru clan. The two branches of the family that participate in the struggle are the Kauravas and the Pandavas. Although the Kauravas are the senior branch of the family, Duryodhan, the eldest Kaurava, is younger than Yudhishthira, the eldest Pandav. The seeds of the climactic battle of Kurukshetra were laid in the boyhood days of the Kauravas and Pandavas, when Shakuni, the maternal uncle of the Kauravas poisoned the mind of Duryodhana. This series ends before the Kurukshetra war actually occurs.

== Cast ==
=== Main ===
- Mrunal Jain as Krishna
- Hiten Tejwani as Karna
- Ronit Roy as Bhishma
- Anita Hassanandani as Draupadi
- Uma Shanker as Yudhishtir
- Aryan Vaid as Duryodhan
- Chetan Hansraj as Bheem
- Ajaz Khan as Dushasan
- Harshad Chopda / Sid Makkar as Arjuna
- Deepak Sandhu as Nakul
- Jatin Shah as Sahadeva

=== Recurring cast ===
- Puja Banerjee as Radha
- Kiran Karmarkar as Shantanu
- Sakshi Tanwar as Ganga
- Ravee Gupta as Satyavati
- Makrand Deshpande as Ved Vyas
- Rakshanda Khan as Amba
- Sonal Udeshi as Ambalika
- Vindhya Tiwari as Ambika
- Jaya Bhattacharya as Kunti
- Kali Prasad Mukherjee as Shakuni
- Deepak Jethi as Dronacharya
- Rituraj Singh as Kashi Naresh
- Akashdeep Saigal as Kans
- Krrish Karnavat as Krishna (child)
- Amar Sharma as Jarasandh
- Anurag Sharma as Shishupala
- Alpesh Patel as King Virata
- Gaurav Nanda as Gargacharaya
- Manoj Ramola as Shatrughna
- Gautam Gulati as Duryodhan (teenage)
- Vishal Thakkar as Bhishma (teenage)
- Lavanya Bhardwaj as Sahadeva (teenage)
- Preeti Gandwani as Yashoda
- Jaswant Menaria as Maharaj Dhritarashtra

== Reception ==
Writing for Livemint, Padmaparna Ghosh wrote that "KHMK suffers from a bad case of Kapoor soap hangover. Soft focus close-ups, shaky camera angles, repeat sequences — the new Mahabharat has it all.". Navya Sinha of Hindustan Times that "Six-pack abs, waxed chests, off-shoulder blouses and a scantily-clad Draupadi decked in a chiffon sari... that’s what Ekta Kapoor’s version of Mahabharata is all about."

Actor Mukesh Khanna stated that producer Ekta Kapoor made a horrendous epic saga which was incomprehensible with the characterisation and costumes of the mythological characters. He also stated that the way Kapoor made the saga was a mockery of Mahabharata.
