= Dharampatni =

- Genre: Family drama
- Created by: DJ's a Creative Unit; Endemol India
- Starring: See below
- Country of origin: India
- Original language: Hindi
- No. of seasons: 1
- No. of episodes: 98

Production
- Executive producer: Aditya Kashyap
- Producers: Dj s creative unit, Endemol shine india ltd.
- Running time: 23 minutes
- Production company: Djs creative and Endemol shine

Original release
- Network: NDTV Imagine
- Release: 16 August 2011 – 2 February 2012

Dharampatni (transl. Dutiful Wife) is an Indian drama television series that aired on Imagine TV. It was jointly produced by DJ's a Creative Unit and Endemol India. It premiered on 16 August 2011 and starred Harshad Chopda, Pankit Thakker and Aasiya Kazi.

== Plot ==
The story is about Mohan, who is sent abroad at a young age and returns after completing his studies. When he returns, he is completely changed, especially in the aspects of his behaviour and ideologies which are different from the others in his family, This change will make the character look grey. There are situations when his thought process counters his family, but the character is not completely grey. Later, because of his personal financial issues and family pressure, he marries a Gujrati girl Kastur, who is opposite of him in case of ideologies, traditions and culture. Mohan respects her, appreciates her and tries to fulfill his responsibilities towards her. However he doesn't love her yet but slowly as the time passes by, he understands her value as his wife and begins to develop feelings for her which turn into true love.

His wife, on the other hand, is loyal to him. She fulfills all her duties as his wife. She will do anything for her husband's and family's well-being and happiness. When she realizes that her husband has started to love her, she is expecting him to admit it.

Saroj did not want her son Mohan, to marry her. But she later realises how dutiful Kastur is.

== Cast ==
- Harshad Chopda as Mohan Galla
- Pankit Thakker as Vipul Galla
- Aasiya Kazi as Kastur
- Supriya Shukla as Saroj Galla
- Gopi Desai
- Mihika Verma
- Ekroop Bedi as Hansika
- Addite Shirwaikar as Mohan Galla's sister
