= Aapki Nazron Ne Samjha =

Indian television series (2021)

- Genre: Romance drama
- Created by: Sonali Jaffar
- Written by: Zaheer Shaikh
- Screenplay by: Vikas Tejpal Sharma
- Story by: Komolika Bhattacharya; Harsha Jagdish
- Directed by: Shashank Bhardwaj
- Creative director: Bhawna Bundela
- Starring: Vijayendra Kumeria; Richa Rathore; Pankit Thakker; Narayani Shastri
- Theme music composer: Sargam Jassu; Nakash Aziz
- Opening theme: Aapki Nazron Ne Samjha
- Composer: Sreerama Chandra
- Country of origin: India
- Original language: Hindi
- No. of seasons: 1
- No. of episodes: 191

Production
- Producers: Sonali Jaffar; Amir Jaffar
- Cinematography: Hrishikesh Gandhi; Manish Sharma
- Editor: Sameer Gandhi
- Camera setup: Multi-camera
- Running time: 20–25 minutes
- Production company: Full House Media

Original release
- Network: StarPlus
- Release: 2 March – 9 October 2021

Related
- Sanjher Baati

Aapki Nazron Ne Samjha (transl. Your eyes have understood)(International name: Unspoken bond)is an Indian television drama series that aired from 2 March 2021 to 9 October 2021 on StarPlus. The plot centers on a blind man named Darsh Rawal, his wife Nandini, and their respective families. The series is a remake of Star Jalsha's Bengali series Sanjher Baati. Set in Dwarka and produced by Full House Media, it stars Vijayendra Kumeria, Richa Rathore and Narayani Shastri.

== Plot ==
The story begins with Darsh Rawal receiving an award for his photography at an event in Paris, France. Despite being blind, Darsh possesses amazing photographic skills. He can sense and visualize the whole world through his mind. In Dwarka, his mother, Rajvi, is concerned about his unmarried status. Meanwhile, Nandini prepares for her sister Bansuri's marriage, but is caught in a storm near the harbor. Darsh risks his life to save Nandini. Bansuri's prospective mother-in-law, Vanlata, demands huge sums of money and gifts as dowry from Nandini for her sister's wedding. Lying about requesting a washing machine, Vanlata forces Nandini to accompany her sister as a household helper until she buys one.

Elsewhere, Rajvi hosts a party to celebrate Darsh's success and homecoming to Dwarka after three years, but he is insulted by some guests for being disabled. Rajvi becomes very tense upon listening to them and vows to find a suitable bride for her son in 30 days, one who will heartily accept him with all his shortcomings. Rajvi arranges a marriage for Darsh with Tosha, but it does not work out. Due to a misunderstanding, Rajvi takes a disliking to Nandini and asks her to leave Dwarka, while Darsh falls for Nandini. Rajvi then arranges Darsh's marriage with his childhood friend, Nirali, unaware that she is already married to Aman Raakla; after both Tosha and Nirali's truth is revealed, Rajvi starts to like Nandini.

Darsh admits that he has fallen in love with Nandini and Rajvi goes to Vanlata requesting Nandini's hand for marriage. Vanlata initially taunts her and refuses but later agrees to Darsh and Nandini's marriage on the condition that Shobhit has to marry Gunjan. Rajvi pleads to Shobhit, who jumps at the chance to redeem himself for causing Darsh's blindness. Rajvi and Shobhit reunite. While Darsh and Nandini's romance blossoms, Gunjan taunts Shobhit and takes advantage of his kindness. Knowing that Darsh always wanted his wedding to take place in Goa, Nandini tells Rajvi and prepares the family to leave for Goa for the wedding. On the wedding day, Nandini is kidnapped by Moped, who attempts to marry her, but she escapes. Namrata lies to Shamika about Nandini and convinces her to sit in Nandini's place.

Darsh realizes that Shamika isn't Nandini, leaving Rajvi to confront the family for making such a decision without her knowledge. Nandini returns to the mandapa, and the two weddings proceed. During the marriage rituals, Charmi tells Darsh privately that Nandini told Rajvi that she would marry Darsh only if Shobhit married Gunjan. Darsh fumes with anger and vows to get revenge on Nandini, not aware that Vanlata made the deal without Nandini's knowledge. Meanwhile, Shobhit vows to create a rift between Darsh and Nandini for ruining his chance to marry Charmi, unaware that Darsh already hates Nandini because of the misunderstanding. Soon, the Rawals witness Darsh and Nandini fighting and learn why he hates Nandini. Rajvi takes a strong stand on Nandini's behalf and tells Darsh that Vanlata was behind the deal, and Nandini did not know anything about it.

Darsh tries to apologize for ruining Nandini's life, but she leaves and returns to her village in Okha. While Darsh goes after her to win her back, Shobhit is left devastated when he learns that Charmi has died. Despite his attempts to win her back, Nandini refuses to return home with Darsh. Bansuri and Rajvi create a plan to force Nandini to return to the Rawals. She agrees to work as Darsh's assistant until she pays back the wedding expenses. Darsh meets Ritesh, who Shobhit plans to use to separate Darsh and Nandini. He deliberately causes Darsh to doubt Nandini and Ritesh's relationship, even going as far as to get pictures taken out of context. The family confronts Nandini for betraying Darsh. Nandini is left heartbroken and leaves the Rawals.

Charmi is revealed to be alive and confronts Shobhit for his evil intentions against Darsh and Nandini. Shocked and left feeling guilty, he confesses to the family about Nandini's innocence and her surprise operation to regain Darsh's eyesight. He leaves with Darsh to find Nandini. Meanwhile, Nandini witnesses a fatal car accident and attempts to help the passengers, during which she drops her purse and phone. Shobhit reaches the accident spot and mistakenly concludes that the deceased woman is Nandini. As Darsh undergoes his operation, the Rawals are left devastated by the news of Nandini's assumed demise and decide to hide it from Darsh. Meanwhile, Nandini adopts Vini, Jhunjhunwala's granddaughter, who believes that Nandini is her mother.

=== 13 days later ===
Nandini raises Vini as her daughter and vows to pay back the loan that Jhunjhunwala, Darsh's business partner, has borrowed with interest. While Shobhit and Gunjan live separately, preparations for Nandini's terahvin begin at the Rawal mansion. Darsh decides to head home a day earlier than expected, as he desires to meet Nandini. This leaves the Rawals shocked and unable to perform Nandini's terahvin. Darsh removes his eye patches and assumes Charmi to be Nandini. Later, Darsh reaches Porbandar to thank Mr. Jhunjhunwala and Darsh starts to feel that Charmi might not be Nandini, but he convinces himself that Charmi is Nandini.

Later, Darsh recognises the real Nandini and confronts Rajvi for hiding the truth. He also realises that Rajvi told Charmi to pretend to be Nandini. Rajvi was told that they did the last rites of Nandini, but little did she know that Nandini was alive and she saw her two days earlier. Darsh breaks all ties with Rajvi and rushes to Nandini. He confesses his love to Nandini and they reunite. Rajvi gets stabbed and Darsh gets arrested. Later, it is revealed that Gunjan stabbed Rajvi. Rajvi regains consciousness and Charmi kills Gunjan.

After being proven innocent, Darsh is released from prison. Charmi becomes obsessed with Darsh and wants to remove Nandini from his life.

Namrata, Darsh and Shobhit's sister, returns home after apparently being physically abused by her husband, Aatish. The Rawals press charges against Aatish for domestic violence, unaware that they have been deceived by Namrata. But Nandini discovers that Aatish is innocent and that Namrata is lying about him being violent so she can get a divorce, because she hates living in a poor area. Nandini then tries to expose Namrata's true colors to the Rawals.

Initially, Nandini's attempts to reveal the truth are thwarted by both Charmi and Namrata respectively, but she ultimately exposes Namrata's true colors, and proves Aatish's innocence. The Rawals apologize to both Aatish and Nandini respectively for not believing them, regarding Namrata's true colors. They also disown Namrata for good, due to her deceitful actions, and because Namrata's deceit led them unawares into wrongdoing.

Nandini meets a woman, named Toral who is mentally unstable. After Toral enters the Rawals' house, Rajvi starts to feel insecure. After a series of events, Charmi's crimes are exposed and she is arrested and imprisoned for her crimes. Even after Charmi's crimes are exposed, she still tries to justify her actions by stating that everything that she did was for Darsh, but in truth, everything she did was for herself.

Toral is also revealed to be Darsh's biological mother, who was admitted to a mental health institution for treatment 28 years ago. Vipul marries Rajvi so that Darsh becomes her son, Nandini is revealed to be pregnant and the series ends on a happy note.

== Cast ==
=== Main ===
- Vijayendra Kumeria as Darsh Rawal - Toral and Vipul's son; Rajvi's stepson; Namrata and Shobhit's half-brother; Nandini's husband; Vini's adoptive father
- Richa Rathore as Nandini "ATM" Rawal / Fake Ishaani Jhunjhunwala - Bansuri's sister; Darsh's wife; Bhanu's younger daughter; Vini's adoptive mother
- Kritika Singh Yadav / Aditi Rathore as Charmi Mehta- Shobhit's ex-girlfriend; Darsh's obsessive lover

=== Recurring ===
- Abhishek Verma as Shobhit Rawal - Rajvi and Vipul's son; Darsh's half-brother; Namrata’s younger brother; Charmi's ex-boyfriend; Gunjan’s widower
- Miloni Kapadia as Gunjan Parekh Rawal - Naveen's daughter; Shobhit's wife; Rakla's ex-girlfriend
- Saurabh Agarwal as Vipul Rawal - Keshav's elder son; Chetan's brother; Toral and Rajvi's husband; Darsh, Namrata and Shobhit's father
- Narayani Shastri as Rajvi Vipul Rawal - Vipul's second wife; Darsh's stepmother; Namrata and Shobhit's mother
- Pankit Thakker as Chetan Rawal - Keshav's younger son; Vipul’s brother; Parul’s husband
- Sucheta Khanna as Toral Vipul Rawal - Vipul's first wife; Darsh's mother
- Renee Dhyani / Vaishnavi Dhanraj / Kshitisha Soni as Namrata Rawal Desai - Rajvi and Vipul's daughter; Shobhit's elder sister; Darsh's half-sister; Aatish's wife
- Ankit Gulati as Aatish Desai - Namrata's husband
- Bharat Pahuja as Keshav Rawal - Vipul and Chetan's father; Namrata, Darsh and Shobhit's grandfather
- Sai Barve as Parul Rawal: Chetan's wife
- Mahi Soni as Vini Rawal (formerly Jhunjhunwala): Ishaani's daughter; Darsh and Nandini's adopted daughter
- Ashish Kulkarni as Naveen Parekh: Bansuri's husband; Gunjan's father; Vanlata's son
- Revati Lele as Bansuri Parekh - Nandini's sister; Bhanu's elder daughter; Naveen’s wife
- Purvi Vyas as Vanlata Parekh - Naveen's mother
- Ayaz Ahmed as Rakla - Nirali's husband; Gunjan's ex-boyfriend
- Ketaki Kadam as Nirali - Darsh's childhood friend; Rakla's wife
- Abigail Jain as Shamika Barot- Darsh's ex-girlfriend; Ritesh's wife
- Varun Sharma as Dr. Ritesh Barot - Nandini's childhood friend; Shamika's husband
- Dolly Chawla as Tosha - Darsh's prospective bride
- Riyaz Panjwani as Mr. Jhunjhunwala: Darsh's business partner and investor; Ishaani's father; Vini's maternal grandfather
- Unknown as Ishaani Jhunjhunwala - Mr. Jhunjhunwala's daughter
- Radhika Pandit as Herself

== Production ==
=== Casting ===
Shivin Narang was initially approached to play Darsh before Vijayendra Kumeria was signed by the producers. In an interview Kumeria called his role as a blind man to be one of the most difficult of his career.

=== Preparation ===
Vijayendra Kumeria watched various films having impaired protagonists, attended workshops, and reduced weight to fit into Darsh's character. Actress Richa Rathore, who was cast as Nandini, attended several workshops to understand and master the Gujarati dialect.

=== Filming ===
Based on the backdrop of Dwarka in Gujarat, the series was mainly filmed at Film City in Mumbai. Some initial sequences were shot in Dwarka in early February 2021.

On 14 April 2021, due to the sudden COVID-19 rules set by the Chief Minister of Maharashtra, Uddhav Thackeray, the shooting halted. Later, the production house planned to move their shoot location to Goa until the next hearings from the government but after Goa too announced a lockdown, the sets were once again shifted to Silvassa, Gujarat.

=== Release ===
The first promo was released on 8 February 2021, the show premiered on 2 March 2021, and the series finale aired on 9 October 2021. From 2 March 2021 to 4 September 2021. In India, Aapki Nazron Ne Samjha aired Monday through Saturday at 6:00 PM on StarPlus, although it was moved to 5:30 PM later in the year.

== Reception ==
The premiere episode of the show garnered 1.1 TRP while averaging 1.0 TRP in its debut week.

== Soundtrack ==
Aapki Nazron Ne Samjha Original Sound Track

Soundtrack album by Sargam Jassu and Nakash Aziz
- Released: 12 March 2021
- Genre: Romance Soundtrack
- Length: 3:14 Minutes
- Language: Hindi
- Label: Star India
- Producers: Aamir Jaffar; Sonali Jaffar

The title song Aapki Nazron Ne Samjha is a remake of the song Aapki Nazron Ne Samja from the 1962 film Anpadh, originally composed by Madan Mohan, written by Raja Mehdi Ali Khan and sung by Lata Mangeshkar. The song was recreated for the series with the music composed by Sargam Jassu and Nakash Aziz and sung by Palak Muchhal and Sreerama Chandra.

Aapki Nazron Ne Samjha: Tracklisting
No.	Title	Artist	Length
1.	"Aapki Nazron Ne Samjha" (Male)	Sreerama Chandra	2:37
2.	"Aapki Nazron Ne Samjha" (Female)	Palak Muchhal	2:37

== Adaptations ==
Language	Title	Premiere date	Network(s)	Last aired	Notes
Bengali	Saanjher Baati সাঁঝের বাতি	1 July 2019	Star Jalsha	12 December 2021	Original
Hindi	Aapki Nazron Ne Samjha आपकी नज़रो ने समझा	2 March 2021	StarPlus	9 October 2021	Remake
Tamil	Raja Paarvai ராஜ பார்வை	22 March 2021	Star Vijay	18 December 2021	Remake
Kannada	Akashadeepa ಆಕಾಶದೀಪ	21 June 2021	Star Suvarna	30 January 2022	Remake
Telugu	Krishnamma Kalipindhi Iddarini కృష్ణమ్మ కలిపింది ఇద్దరినీ	9 May 2023	Star Maa	23 September 2023	Remake
