= Matti Ki Banno =

- Genre: Drama
- Written by: Anand Vardhan, Sharad Tripathi, Amit Jha
- Directed by: Shyam Maheshwari & Yash Chauhan
- Creative director: Anand Vardhan
- Narrated by: Hema Malini
- Theme music composer: Anurag Bharadwaj
- Country of origin: India
- Original language: Hindi
- No. of seasons: 1
- No. of episodes: 96 (1 special episode)

Production
- Producers: Hema Malini; Mohan Raghavan
- Cinematography: Vineet Sapru
- Editors: Rocchak Ahuja; Anshul Ahuja
- Camera setup: Multi-camera
- Running time: 24 minutes
- Production company: Hema Malini Media Entertainment

Original release
- Network: Colors TV
- Release: 27 December 2010 – 6 May 2011

Matti ki Banno (transl. Clay's Banno) is an Indian television series that aired on Colors TV from 27 December 2010 to 6 May 2011. It based on the story of an orphaned girl, Avanti who is in search for her land, her family. Who enters a world at once savage and alien to her. The story validates the traditional Indian belief that no matter how vulnerable or fragile one believes one is or how perilous and insurmountable the obstacle...to overcome the most arduous of climbs all you need is a strong will and a good heart.

== Plot ==
Matti Ki Banno is the story of an orphaned girl whose entire life has been a struggle to belong to a people and a land. At the heart of the narrative is Avanti's determination to overcome the feeling of isolation and loneliness that resulted from a dispossession of all the loved ones that she once had and a deep yearning to have a family and a place she can call home. The show takes off from the point when Avanti, now eighteen years old, relates to the viewer her journey from when she was a pampered child of her parents in Muzaffarpur to how she was orphaned and banished to being an extremely ill-treated housemaid (in her own Bua's house) in the far-away land of Mauritius.

In spite of spending the best part of her life amongst people who subjected her to abject destitution and in a country which only served to enhance her feeling of uprootedness, Avanti never gave up on the one thing that eventually made her life turn around — humanness.

Avanti's simplicity and charm wins the heart of the suave, sophisticated Arjun. What follows is a classic fairytale where Avanti's prince charming rescues her from the drudgery of her life as maid. Avanti and Arjun get married in the picturesque country of Mauritius. Avanti finally is convinced that after all destiny did have a plan for her. But soon, the happily-ever-after phase gets interrupted when, to her shock, Avanti realises that her husband Arjun is not what he had promised to be. He has a secret past that he has hidden with a bunch of lies that, if exposed, will shatter the two forever. When Avanti confronts Arjun about his past, he tells her that his real name is Vikram and that he comes from a rich, powerful political family in Chappran Bihar; the reason he hid this from her is that they are unruly, uncivilised, uncouth and ruthless in their ways and beliefs which is why even he has disassociated from them. Being an optimist, Avanti looks for the silver lining and, instead of giving up on fate, uses the opportunity to belong to a large joint family as she always longed to do.

In her need for a family and love she has had for all these years she does not realise that Vikram has not told her the real story. Like a good Indian bahu she decides to reunite Vikram with his family in Chappra. Avanti's remaining defences are shattered when she comes to Chappra with Vikram and realises that, like the rest of the men in her sasural, her husband was not immune to the corruptible ways of an outlaw life. She witnesses in shock how gradually the loving, responsible Vikram morphs into someone totally alien to her once he is in Chappra. Avanti realizes in horror how in a bid to reunite Vikram with his family she has unknowingly stepped into an abyss of lies, deceit and a trap from which she can never escape. Will Avanti be able to win back Vikram's love? Will her goodness be able to transform the evil in the family where she longs to belong? What is this dark secret Vikram and his family are hiding from Avanti? Will she be able to transform this family and change their regressive ways or will she become one of them?

== Cast ==
- Via Chaudhary as Avanti
- Jannat Zubair Rahmani as Avanti as a kid
- Manoj Chandila as Vikram Singh/Arjun
- Natasha Rana as Baby Buaji
- Raj Premi as Surya Narayan Singh
- Nishigandha Wad as Janki Singh
- Yashodhan Rana as Jasodhan
- Akshay Verma ...
- Shiraz Mustafa ...
- Alka Shlesha as Dadi (Grandmother)
- Aasiya Kazi as Saudamini
