= Jhanak =

Indian television series

- Genre: Drama; Romance; Tragedy
- Created by: Leena Gangopadhyay
- Written by: Dialogue: Leena Gangopadhyay
- Screenplay by: Leena Gangopadhyay
- Story by: Leena Gangopadhyay
- Directed by: Saibal Banerjee; Sujit Pyne; Yogesh Bhati; Gourav Sharma
- Creative director: Garima Dimri
- Starring: Hiba Nawab; Krushal Ahuja; Chandni Sharma; Riya Sharma; Arjit Taneja; Twinkle Arora; Rajveer Singh
- Theme music composer: Debojyoti Mishra
- Composer: Dwarkesh Joshi
- Country of origin: India
- Original language: Hindi
- No. of seasons: 2
- No. of episodes: 923

Production
- Executive producers: Arabinda Dasgupta & Debolina Mukhopadhyay (Magic Moments Motion Pictures); Taniya, Supriyo & Shayak (StarPlus)
- Producers: Saibal Banerjee; Leena Gangopadhyay
- Cinematography: Pankaj Saha; Satish Shetty
- Editors: Sameer; Soumen; Janak Chauhan
- Camera setup: Multi-camera
- Running time: 40 minutes
- Production company: Magic Moments Motion Pictures

Original release
- Network: StarPlus
- Release: 20 November 2023 – 31 May 2026

Related
- Jol Nupur; Ishti Kutum

Jhanak is an Indian Hindi-language television drama series that aired on StarPlus from 20 November 2023 to 31 May 2026 and streams digitally on JioHotstar. Produced under Magic Moments Motion Pictures, the series originally starred Hiba Nawab, Krushal Ahuja and Chandni Sharma in the lead roles. The story of the first generation was inspired by the Star Jalsha's Bengali series, Jol Nupur.

Since June 2025, the show featured Riya Sharma in the titular role as Jhanak (the daughter of Jhanak, previously portrayed by Hiba Nawab), along with Arjit Taneja (replaced by Rajveer Singh) and Twinkle Arora. The second-generation storyline is a loose adaptation of Star Jalsha's Bengali series, Ishti Kutum.

The show also featured Megha Chakraborty as Ishani in a parallel storyline. Following the positive response to Ishani's storyline, it was developed into a standalone series titled Ishani, which premiered from 3 July 2025 to 27 October 2025.

== Plot ==
After her mother's death, Jhanak is forced to marry her cousin Arshi's fiancé, Aniruddh, to escape her stalker, Tejas. Although Aniruddh and Arshi have been together for seven years, Jhanak enters their lives under distressing circumstances and begins to work as the Bose household's maid. While some family members treat her kindly, others insult and belittle her. Despite Arshi's presence, Jhanak and Aniruddh become close and become intimate when he is intoxicated during a trip to Kashmir.

Their secret marriage is exposed, causing major tension within the family. Though humiliated, Arshi decides to stay. Jhanak moves to Mumbai to pursue her dream of becoming a dancer and returns, claiming to be pregnant with Aniruddh's child. However, it is revealed to be a tumour. Aniruddh suffers a heart attack, and Jhanak is presumed dead after being targeted by Srishti and Tejas. She is rescued by Kulbhushan, Brijbhushan's lookalike, and soon learns that Brijbhushan is her biological father. Kulbhushan, with the help of Srishti and Urvashi, had stolen Brijbhushan's identity. Determined to expose them, Jhanak returns disguised as Nutan. During an anniversary celebration, their truth is revealed. Kulbhushan murders Brijbhushan, and Aniruddh, still in love with Jhanak, falsely claims to have cancer to marry her. Arshi reveals to everyone that she is pregnant with Aniruddh's child. It is revealed that she had spiked his drink and posed as Jhanak in order to have sex with him, hoping to bind him to her forever because of their baby. Upon discovering the truth, a heartbroken Jhanak breaks off ties with Aniruddh and leaves for Mumbai with Aditya Kapoor.

Kulbhushan's men kidnap Jhanak, but she manages to escape. Meanwhile, property disputes erupt in the Bose family, and Jhanak ends up in Gujarat disguised as Vihaan's late wife, Avni. She is shocked to discover that Aniruddh is Vihaan's close friend. At a family wedding, Arshi exposes Jhanak's true identity. A marriage is arranged between Jhanak and Vihaan, but she flees before the ceremony.

Jhanak is captured again by Kulbhushan's men but is saved by an elderly couple. She ends up in a red-light area and escapes to a police station, where Choton finds her and brings her back to the Bose house. During Arshi's baby shower, Srishti publicly apologises and claims to be Jhanak's mother. Arshi gives birth to a daughter and Jhanak becomes the caretaker of the child but continues to face humiliation and abuse from the family. Jhanak eventually learns that Arshi's daughter was swapped at birth. During the Holi festival, she exposes the truth and begins searching for the real child. Meanwhile, Laal divorces Bipasha after her father, Sarveshwar, reappears. Bipasha conspires with him to send Jhanak to Banaras.

Jhanak tracks down the man responsible for stealing Arshi's baby and attempts to expose him. Meanwhile, Mimi and Anirban plan their wedding, and a false case is filed against Jhanak. She is arrested, but Aniruddh and Mimi testify in her defence, revealing the constant mental abuse she endured in the Bose household. Inspector Sanjay Sarkar uncovers that several police officers helped Shubho, Tanuja, and Arshi frame Jhanak by suppressing evidence, and exposes this to the court. The judge dismisses the case due to lack of evidence and clears Jhanak of all charges. Shubho, Tanuja, and Arshi are left humiliated as the truth comes to light, and justice finally prevails for Jhanak.

Arshi meets Siddharth Chatterjee and quickly falls in love with him, while Aniruddh leaves the Bose house to live in a live-in relationship with Jhanak. When Aniruddh learns of Arshi's growing closeness to Siddharth, he insists that Arshi divorce him so that he can marry Jhanak and she can be with Siddharth. The divorce proceedings nearly reach completion, but Siddharth betrays Arshi and elopes with his girlfriend, leaving her devastated. Aniruddh and Jhanak return to the Bose house and begin their wedding preparations. However, on the wedding day, Arshi returns and refuses to grant the divorce. Heartbroken, Jhanak runs away and, on her journey, finds Arshi and Aniruddh's kidnapped daughter, Aditi, affectionately nicknamed "Moon". She rescues her, boards a bus, and meets Parashar, who saves them both from Kulbhushan's goons and takes them to Shimulbuni. Over time, Jhanak and Parashar grow close as he supports her and helps raise Moon as his own daughter.

=== 5 years later ===
Although Aniruddh and Arshi remain married, their relationship turns cold and distant. Aniruddh continues to live in the memories of Jhanak, while in Shimulbuni, Parashar becomes a father-figure to Moon, and Jhanak raises her as her own child. Unaware of Jhanak's presence in Shimulbuni, Aniruddh arrives there for an office project. The two reunite and have a one night stand. The next day, Aniruddh hears rumours that Jhanak is Parashar's wife and feels betrayed. Jhanak then reveals the truth—that Moon is actually Aniruddh and Arshi's biological daughter. Wanting the best for Moon, Jhanak sends her away with Aniruddh to Kolkata despite her heartbreak. Arshi struggles to bond with Moon. Soon after, Jhanak is poisoned in the village and rushed to the hospital by Parashar and the villagers. Aniruddh arrives, learns that Jhanak and Parashar were never married, and decides to marry Jhanak in the village. Parashar, secretly in love with Jhanak, is heartbroken but hides his pain and supports their union. Aniruddh and Jhanak eventually marry, and Jhanak reveals that she is pregnant with his child. However, Aniruddh refuses to believe her and accuses Parashar of being the father. Devastated by his mistrust and accusations, Jhanak severs all ties with him, realizing that, Aniruddh is unworthy of her love. The two permanently part ways.

=== 20 years later ===
Jhanak has renamed herself Nutan and is raising her and Aniruddh's daughter, Jhanak, affectionately nicknamed "Phool", with love and care in their village along with Parashar. Jhanak aspires to become a doctor to give her mother a better life. Meanwhile, Arshi and Aniruddh have shifted to London with the Bose family. A grown-up Aditi, nicknamed "Moon" is now in a relationship, with a police officer, named Rishi Chatterjee. Rishi is sent to Parashar's village to capture him where he meets Jhanak. Aniruddh and Arshi return to India and Arshi disapproves of Aditi and Rishi's relationship due to his simple family background. In the village due to a misunderstanding, Jhanak is forced to marry Rishi. Jhanak shifts to Kolkota with Rishi for higher studies and they decide to keep their marriage secret. Jhanak enters Rishi's house as a maid named Phool. However, Aditi continues to point out Rishi and Jhanak's growing closeness. Regardless, Rishi and Aditi get married.

Nutan dies because of an illness which devastates Jhanak. Aniruddh learns of this through Rishi so he begins to connect the dots and realises that Phool is married to Rishi. He offers her a ransom to leave Kolkata and Rishi for good, but she declines. Aniruddh exposes Rishi and Jhanak's secret marriage in order to steer her away forever. Aditi divorces Rishi and accuses him of having an extramarital affair with Jhanak. Jhanak refutes these claims and stands up for herself.

Jhanak moves from the Chatterjee house to a hostel to focus on her studies. Aniruddh becomes vengeful towards Jhanak and decides to ruin her life. He frames her for wrongdoing that she didn't commit and tries to ruin her internship to effect her expulsion from the hostel. He even attempts to murder her, but all his efforts fail. Jhanak discovers that Aniruddh is her biological father, a claim Aniruddh rejects. Jhanak takes the issue to court to clear her mother's name and demands a DNA test. The results confirm that Jhanak is Aniruddh's biological daughter. Arshi confronts Aniruddh over hiding the fact that he fathered a child with her arch-nemesis, Nutan. Aniruddh makes Arshi understand that Nutan is dead and that he has had no connection with her for the last twenty years. He also begins to regret for unknowingly plotting to kill his own daughter. Arshi and Aniruddh continue to argue over his betrayal. Aditi convinces them to divorce each other and work on themselves separately. Rishi continues to support Jhanak emotionally. Meanwhile, Rishi's family recognises Jhanak's positive and hardworking side. They sympathize with her hardships and gradually change their perception of her.

Jhanak tops her exams and earns her medical license fulfilling her dream of becoming a doctor. Jhanak and Rishi realize that they become accustomed to one another and have fallen in love. They marry with everyone's blessings. Aniruddh asks Jhanak for forgiveness and strives to be a present and better father to her. Aditi moves on and forgives Aniruddh, Jhanak and Rishi. She accepts Jhanak as her half-sister and marries Kaushik. Jhanak gains respect in the Chatterjee house for her character and behavior.

However, Arshi continues to be vengeful against Jhanak and holds her and Nutan responsible for constantly ruining her life. She poisons Jhanak in order to kill her. However, Jhanak recovers from the poison and Rishi is sure that Arshi is the culprit. Aditi proves Arshi guilty and shames her. When Rishi is about to arrest Arshi, Jhanak pleads to not arrest Arshi. Arshi is touched by her gesture and begins to regret her behavior towards Nutan and Jhanak. She begs Jhanak for forgiveness. Jhanak forgives her since her mother never held any grudge against Arshi. She makes Arshi and Aniruddh realize that they have always belonged to each other and has them marry while Aditi marries Kaushik, forgetting her past with Rishi.

Parashar is arrested by his rival since he was trying to improve their village. Jhanak and Rishi collaborate to free him and succeed. However, this costs Rishi his job. The villagers encourage Jhanak to continue her mother Nutan's incomplete dream of social service. Hence, she decides to take part in politics with the support of Rishi, Parashar and everyone else. She wins the election and becomes the MLA of Shimulboni. She pledges to be an honest leader and promises to help every person in need. Jhanak and Rishi reminisce their journey and he promises that he will always be by her side.

== Cast ==
=== Main ===
- Hiba Nawab / Parvati Sehgal as Jhanak "Nutan" Raina Bhanushali Bose: An honest dancer; Srishti and Brijbhushan's daughter (2023–2025) / (2025)
- Krushal Ahuja / Sumeet Sachdev as Aniruddha "Ani" Bose: Shubhankar and Tanuja's son (2023–2025) / (2025–2026)
- Chandni Sharma / Ashlesha Sawant as Arshi Mukherjee Bose: A dancer; Srishti and Vinayak's daughter (2023–2025) / (2025–2026)
- Riya Sharma as Dr. Jhanak "Phool" Bose Chatterjee: Jhanak Raina and Aniruddha's daughter; Rishi's wife (2025–2026)
- Arjit Taneja / Rajveer Singh as Inspector Rishi Chatterjee: Tanushree and Abhimanyu's son; Jhanak Chatterjee's husband (2025) / (2025–2026)
- Twinkle Arora as Aditi "Moon" Bose Mitra: A professor; Arshi and Aniruddha's daughter; Rishi's ex-wife; Kaushik's wife (2025–2026)
  - Savi Jain as child Aditi "Moon" Bose (2025)

=== Raina family ===
- Sangeetaa Ballachandran as Mrs. Raina: Srishti, Urvashi, Bharat and Laxman's mother (2023)
- Shilpa Tulaskar as Urvashi Raina: A dancer; Mrs. Raina's younger daughter (2023)
- Bharat Kaul as Bharat Raina: Mrs. Raina's elder son; Srishti, Laxman and Urvashi's brother; Kaushalya's husband; Aarya's father (2023-2024)
- Ekta Sharma as Kaushalya Raina: Bharat's wife; Aarya's mother; (2023)
- Anand Sharma as Laxman Raina: Mrs Raina's younger son; Bharat, Srishti and Urvashi's brother; Urmila's husband (2023)
- Neetu Bhatt as Urmila Raina: Laxman's wife (2023)

=== Mukherjee family ===
- Dolly Sohi / Poorva Gokhale / Parinita Seth as Srishti Raina Mukherjee: A dishonest and disgraced dancer; Mrs Raina's elder daughter (2023–2024) / (2024–2025) / (2025)
- Saurabh Agarwal as Vinayak Mukherjee: A scientist; Srishti's second husband; Arshi's father (2023–2025)

=== Bhanushali family ===
- Sanjay Gandhi as
  - Brijbhushan Bhanushali: An honest dance teacher; Kulbhushan's twin brother and enemy; Srishti's estranged husband and enemy (2024; dead)
  - Kulbhushan Bhanushali: Brijbhushan's twin brother, imposter, enemy and murderer; Jhanak Raina's uncle and kidnapper; Srishti's partner-in-crime (2023–2025)

=== Bose family ===
- Madhuri Sanjeev as Arundhati Bose: Matriarch of the Bose family; Amitabh's wife (2023–2025)
- Prithvi Zutshi as Amitabh Bose: Patriach of the Bose family; Arundhati's husband (2023–2025)
- Ajay Chakraborty as Dipankar "Bablu" Bose: Amitabh and Arundhati's eldest son (2023–2026)
- Reena Pimpale as Anjana Bose: Dipankar's wife; Aparajita and Laal's mother (2023–2026)
- Sunny Sachdeva as Laal Bose: A college professor: Dipankar and Anjana's son (2023–2025)
- Kajal Pisal as Tanuja Bose: Shubhankar's wife (2023–2025; dead)
- Sachin Verma as Advocate Shubhankar "Shubho" Bose: A dishonest and disgraced lawyer; Amitabh and Arundhati's second son (2023–2025)
- Srijani Banerjee as IAS Mimi Bose: Tanuja and Shubhankar's elder daughter (2023–2025)
- Meghna Kukreja / Aarshavi Joshi / Simran Khanna as Rumi Bose: Tanuja and Shubhankar's younger daughter (2023–2024) / (2024–2025) / (2025)
- Puneet Panjwani as Rupankar "Choton" Bose: Amitabh and Arundhati's youngest son (2023-2025)
- Deepali Pansare / Ankita Sharma as Mrinalini "Minu" Ghosh Bose: A school principal; Rupankar's wife (2024–2025) / (2025)

=== Chatterjee family (Season 1) ===
- Barsha Chatterjee / Chitrapama Banerjee as Anuradha Chatterjee: Pranay's widow (2024–2025) / (2025)
- Bhavya Sachdeva as Lalon Chaterjee: An honest famous singer; Anuradha and Pranay's son (2024-2025)
- Ankita Chakraborty as Aparajita "Appu" Bose Chatterjee: An honest singer: Anjana and Dipankar's daughter (2023-2025)
- Isha Pandey / Enakshi Ganguly as Kajol Sen Chatterjee: A teacher; Lalon's friend and second wife (2024–2025) / (2025)
- Komal Thakur as Jimli Chatterjee: Anuradha and Pranay's daughter (2024–2025)

=== Parekh family ===
- Vaishali Thakkar as Ketki Parekh: Matriarch of the Parekh family; Mahendranath's wife (2025)
- Muni Jha as Mahendranath Parekh: Patriarch of the Parekh family; Ketki's husband (2025)
- Jignesh Joshi as Bhavesh Parekh: Ketki and Mahendranath's eldest son (2025)
- Piyali Munshi as Prachi Parekh: Bhavesh's wife; Priyanshi's mother (2025)
- Mahi Khan as Priyanshi Parekh: Bhavesh and Prachi's daughter (2025)
- Aarya Dharamchand Kumar as Hitesh Parekh: Ketki and Mahendranath's second son (2025)
- Soniyaa Kaur as Sejal Parekh: Hitesh's wife; Riddhi's mother (2025)
- Jia Narigara as Riddhi Parekh: Sejal and Hitesh's daughter (2025)
- Kunal Verma as Dr. Vihaan Parekh: Ketki and Mahendranath's youngest son (2025)
- Ahil Sharma as Ahaan Parekh: Avni and Vihaan's son; Jhanak Raina's foster son (2025)
- Rupali Thapa as Mehek Parekh: Ketki and Mahendranath's daughter (2025)

=== Chatterjee family (Season 2) ===
- Sanjeev Seth as Jyotirmay "Dadabhai" Chatterjee: Patriarch of the Chatterjee family (2025–2026)
- Purva Parag as Indumati Chatterjee: Matriarch of the Chatterjee family; Jyotirmay's wife (2025–2026)
- Astha Agarwal as Neelu Chatterjee: Jyotirmay and Indumati's elder daughter (2025–2026)
- Harsha Khandeparkar as Putul Chatterjee Mukherjee: Jyotirmay and Indumati's younger daughter (2025–2026)
- Shrey Pareek as Dr. Dhritiman Chatterjee: Jyotirmay and Indumati's son (2025–2026)
- Amaira Jairath as Sanjhbati Chatterjee: Dhritiman's wife (2025–2026)
- Ujjwal Rana as Abhimanyu Chatterjee: Jyotirmay's and Surjeet's brother (2025–2026)
- Jyoti Mukherjee as Tanushree Chatterjee: Abhimanyu's wife(2025–2026)
- Saloni Rathi / Surbhi Rohra as Dr. Mishti Chatterjee: Tanushree and Abhimanyu's daughter (2025–2026)
- Anuj Khurana / Vishal Nayak as Dr. Surjeet Chatterjee: Jyotirmay and Abhimanyu's brother (2025–2026) / (2026)
- Nandini Karmarkar as Kaju Chatterjee: Surjeet and Payal's daughter (2025–2026)
- Jivansh Gupta as Badam Chatterjee: Surjeet and Payal's son; Kaju's brother (2025–2026)

=== Mitra family ===
- Krishna Soni as Mr. Mitra: Gopa's husband; Kaushik's father (2026)
- Mridula Oberoi as Gopa Mitra: Mr. Mitra's wife; Kaushik's mother (2026)
- Ayush Anand / Pulkit Bangia as Kaushik Mitra: Mr. Mitra and Gopa's son; Aditi's second husband (2026)/(2026)

=== Others ===
- Rajani Gupta as Radha: Urmila's friend (2023)
- Rishi Kaushik as Tejas Kumar: A corrupt politician; Jhanak's obsessive lover (2023-2024)
- Satvik Sankhyan as Rahul: Jhanak's college best friend and one-sided love interest (2023-2024)
- Patrali Chattopadhyay as Bipasha Jha: Nandini and Sarveshwar's daughter; Laal's ex wife (2023–2025)
- Pankaj Bijlani as Dr. Anirban Sen: Mimi's love interest (2024-2025)
- Ajeet Agrawal as Guru Ji: Head of the Ashram; Brijbhushan's friend (2024)
- Amit Dolawat as Advocate Devashish Roy: Jhanak and Brijbhushan's lawyer (2024)
- Tarun Raj Nihalani as Rudra Pratap Singh "Guru ji": A dance teacher; Jhanak's mentor; Pallavi's husband (2024)
- Sanjana Sinha as Pallavi Pratap Singh; Pratap's wife (2024)
- Salman Shaikh as Aditya Kapoor: A famous actor; Jhanak's friend and one-sided love interest (2024)
- Saurabh Gumber as Anindo: A fraudster; Jimli's ex-husband (2024)
- Piyush Sahdev as Siddharth "Sid" Chatterjee: Arshi's ex-love interest (2025)
- Gaurav Sharma/Sachal Tyagi as Anant "Parashar" Kumar Nihar: A tribal leader; Jhanak's helper (2025) / (2025–2026)
- Ruchi Tripathi/Puja Sharma as Kanka (2025) / (2025–2026)
- Komal Srivastav as Sakhi: Nutan's friend (2025–2026)
- Unknown/Unknown as Bua Ji: Parashar's aunt (2025)/(2025-2026)
- Shivam Singh Mandloi as Veer: Parashar's friend (2025)
- Amita Kulkarni as Payal: A school teacher; Surjeet's ex wife; Kaju and Badam's mother (2025–2026)
- Adish Vaidya as Ankush: Indranath's rival; Rishi's kidnapper (2026)
- V S Prince Ratann as Billa: Ankush's man (2026)
- Rakesh Kukreti as Indranath: An education minister (2026)
- Arham Abbasi as Arya Mukherjee: Putul's husband (2026)
- Sumit Bhardwaj as Dr. Ayushmaan: Jhanak Chatterjee's boss (2026)

=== Guest appearances ===
- Neha Harsora as Sailee Jadhav from Udne Ki Aasha (2024, 2025, 2026)
- Rutuja Bagwe as Vaijayanti "Vaiju" to promote Maati Se Bandhi Dor (2024)
- Kumar Sanu as himself (2024)
- Sonakshi Batra as Meghla Sen from Iss Ishq Ka Rabb Rakha (2024, 2025)
- Shreya Jain as Adrija Sen to promote Iss Ishq Ka Rabb Rakha (2024)
- Vaibhavi Hankare as Tejaswini Chavan from Ghum Hai Kisikey Pyaar Meiin (2025)
- Khushi Dubey as Gauri from Jaadu Teri Nazar – Daayan Ka Mausam (2025)
- Shritama Mitra as Anjali Awasthi from Advocate Anjali Awasthi (2025)
- Param Singh as Neelkant Pradhan from Ghum Hai Kisikey Pyaar Meiin (2025)
- Megha Chakraborty as Ishani Sengupta from Ishani (2025)
- Anupam Bhattacharya as Shashwat Sengupta from Ishani (2025)
- Aasiya Kazi as Nandini Mitra Sengupta from Ishani (2025)
- Richa Rathore as Pihu Sengupta from Ishani (2025)
- Tanmay Nagar as Yash Sengupta from Ishani (2025)
- Sneha Bhawsar as Ankita Ghosh from Ishani (2025)
- Shresth Kumar as Jeet from Ishani (2025)
- Divya Patil as Khushi from Maana Ke Hum Yaar Nahi (2025)
- Manjeet Makkar as Krishna from Maana Ke Hum Yaar Nahi (2025)
- Ashika Padukone as Deepa from Shehzaadi... Hai Tu Dil Ki (2025)
- Saisha Kumawat as Jyoti from Shehzaadi... Hai Tu Dil Ki (2025)
- Anuradha Paudwal as herself (2026)
- Kanwar Dhillon as Sachin Deshmukh from Udne Ki Aasha in Baisakhi Da Mela (2026)
- Rohit Suchanti as Angad Virani from Kyunki Rishton Ke Bhi Roop Badalte Hain in Baisakhi Da Mela (2026)
- Tanisha Mehta as Vrinda Gokhale Virani from Kyunki Rishton Ke Bhi Roop Badalte Hain in Baisakhi Da Mela (2026)
- Krushal Ahuja as Yuvraj Shekhwat from Taara in Baisakhi Da Mela (2026)
- Kanikka Kapur as Taara Shekhawat from Taara in Baisakhi Da Mela (2026)

== Production ==
=== Development ===
Jhanak is produced by Leena Gangopadhyay and Saibal Banerjee under Magic Moments Motion Pictures. It is inspired from Jol Nupur. This is the first Hindi show of the production house.

=== Casting ===
Hiba Nawab was cast in the titular role of Jhanak. Krushal Ahuja was cast as Aniruddha Bose opposite Hiba Nawab. Chandni Sharma was cast as Arshi, the parallel lead. Dolly Sohi was cast as Arshi's mother Srishti, while Kajal Pisal was cast as Aniruddh's mother Tanuja. Rishi Kaushik was cast as Tejas, Jhanak's obsessive lover.

In January 2024, Sohi quit the show and was replaced by Poorva Gokhale. In April 2024, Deepali Pansare was cast as Mrinalini, opposite Puneet Panjwani.

Zohaib Siddiqui and Erica Fernandes were approached to play the new leads post the generation leap, but Riya Sharma, Arjit Taneja and Twinkle Arora were finalized. Krushal Ahuja was replaced by Sumeet Sachdev as the older Anirudh, while Parvati Sehgal took over the role of the older Jhanak, replacing Nawab. Ashlesha Sawant replaced Chandni Sharma as older Arshi.

=== Filming ===
The shooting of the series began in September 2023. It was primarily based in Kashmir and Kolkata, and some initial episodes were shot in both locations.

Nawab had learned to row a shikara within two days for the role of Jhanak.

=== Release ===
In June 2025, a promo for the twenty-year leap was released featuring Riya Sharma and Arjit Taneja as new leads, respectively playing Jhanak and Rishi. Taneja quit the show in September 2025, and was replaced by Rajveer Singh and the show's runtime extended to 45-minutes and shifted to 11.00 pm (IST).

== Adaptations ==
Language	Title	Premiere date	Network(s)	Last aired	Notes	Ref
Bengali	Jol Nupur জল নূপুর	21 January 2013	Star Jalsha	5 December 2015	Original	
Hindi	Jhanak झनक	20 November 2023	Star Plus	8 June 2025	Inspired	
Bengali	Roshnai রোশনাই	25 April 2024	Star Jalsha	20 July 2025	Inspired	
