= Sonal Udeshi =

Indian actress

Sonal Udeshi is an Indian actress, who worked in numerous television show. Her work includes C.I.D, Kuch Hawa Badli Si and Kaisi Yeh Zindgani, in which she played the lead role.

== Television ==
Serial	Year	Role	Notes
Palwasha	2007	Palwasha	Afghan TV serial
Kahaani Hamaaray Mahaabhaarat Ki	2008	Ambalika	
C.I.D	2008	Karishma	
Raghukul Reet Sada Chali Aayi	2008	Vipasha	
Kaisi Yeh Zindgani	2011-2012	Niharika	
Kyun Apne Hue Paraye		Shradha	
Koi To Ho Ardhnarishwar		Pallavi	
Saat Vachan Saat Phere			
Kuchh Hawa Badli Si		Sanjeeda	
Akhand Saubhagyavati Bhava	2012	Anuradha	
Lal Kothi Alvida	2012	Shalini	
