= Ishhan Dhawan =

Indian television actor

- Born: 8 November 1995 (age 30); Chandigarh, India
- Education: Chitkara University, Chandigarh
- Occupation: Actor
- Years active: 2020–present
- Notable work: Gud Se Meetha Ishq; Dhruv Tara – Samay Sadi Se Pare; Doree; Yeh Fitoor Tera

Ishhan Dhawan is an Indian actor who predominantly works in the Hindi television industry. He is best known for his portrayal of Kabir Sakhuja in Zindagi Mere Ghar Aana, Neel Khurana in Gud Se Meetha Ishq, Dr. Dhruv Saxena in Dhruv Tara – Samay Sadi Se Pare, Advocate Maan Thakur in Doree and Jeet Saxena in Yeh Fitoor Tera.

== Career ==
Dhawan started his acting career in 2020 with the web series Bebaakee, which streamed on ZEE5 and ALTBalaji, where he played the role of Hamid Alqaazi.

He made his debut in the television industry in 2021 with StarPlus's show Zindagi Mere Ghar Aana where he played the role of Kabir Sakhuja. In 2022, Ishhan portrayed the role of Neel Khurana in Star Bharat's show Gud Se Meetha Ishq opposite Pankhuri Awasthy Rode, marking his first show in a lead role.

From 2023 to 2024, he portrayed the lead role of Dr. Dhruv Saxena in Sony SAB's sci-fi fantasy romantic drama Dhruv Tara – Samay Sadi Se Pare opposite Riya Sharma. From January 2025 to June 2025, he played the lead role of Advocate Maan Thakur in Colors TV's show Doree Season 2 opposite Priyanshi Yadav. Since August 2026, he is currently essaying the role of Jeet Saxena in Star Plus' romantic drama Yeh Fitoor Tera, opposite Debchandrima Singha Roy.

== Media image ==
In 2026, he was listed in Under 40 TV Stars who are ruling the industry by the Indian edition of Variety.

== Filmography ==
=== Television ===
Year	Title	Role	Notes	Ref
2021–2022	Zindagi Mere Ghar Aana	Kabir Sakhuja	Supporting Role	
2022	Gud Se Meetha Ishq	Neel Khurana	Lead Role	
2023–2024	Dhruv Tara – Samay Sadi Se Pare	Dr. Dhruv Saxena	Lead Role	
2024	Dhruv Tara – Samay Sadi Se Pare	Dhruv Seth	Lead Role	
2025	Doree 2	Advocate Maan Thakur	Lead Role	
2026–present	Yeh Fitoor Tera	Jeet Saxena	Lead Role	

=== Web series ===
Year	Show	Role	Notes	Ref.
2020	Bebaakee	Hamid Alqaazi	Supporting Role	

== Awards and nominations ==
Year	Award	Category	Work	Result
2026	Ngôi Sao Xanh 2025 (Green Star Awards)	Most Popular Foreign Actor	Dhruv Tara – Samay Sadi Se Pare	Won
