= Dinesh Kaushik =

Indian television actor

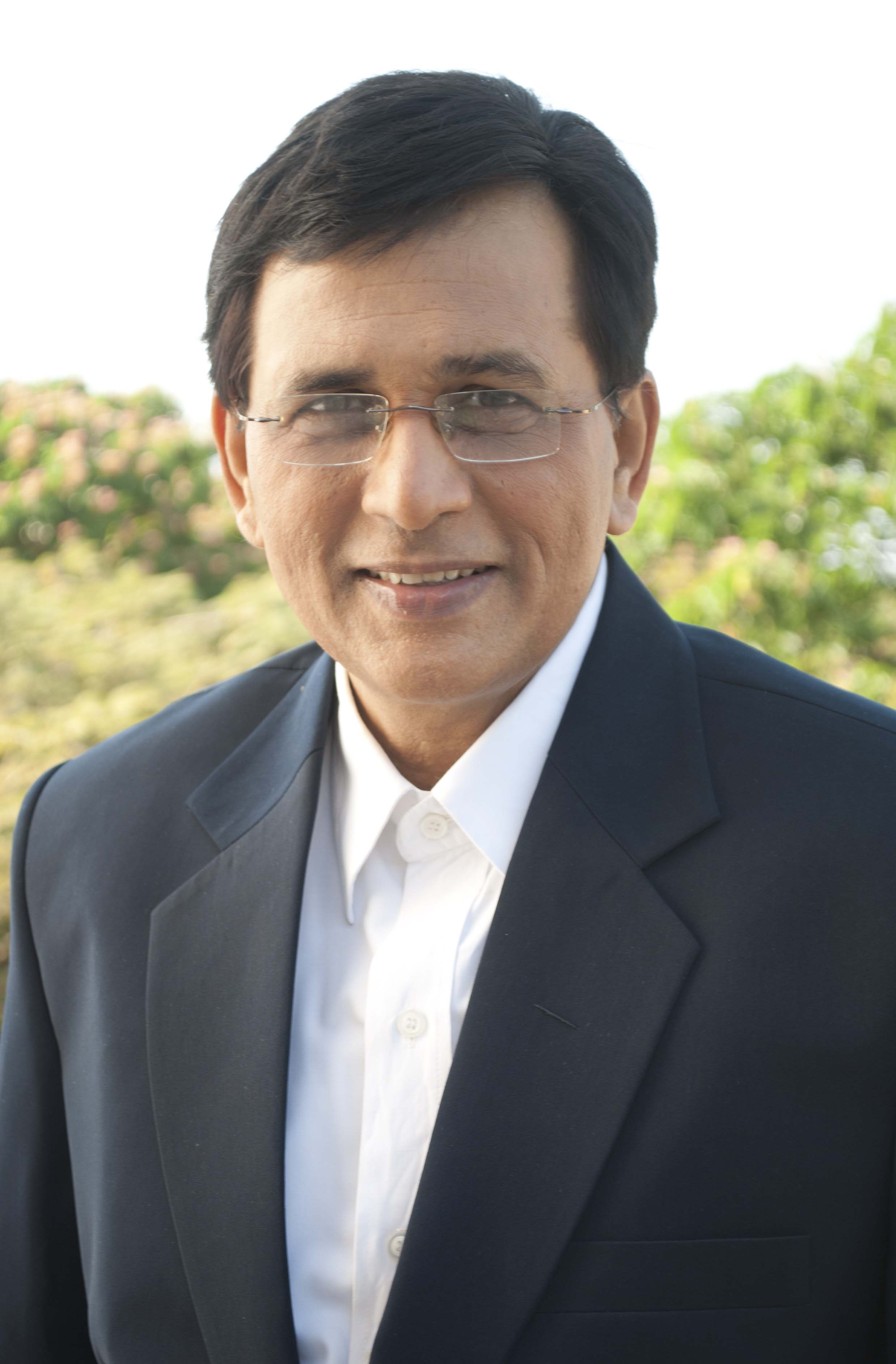
- Born: 27 May 1957 (age 68); Bhatinda, Punjab, India
- Years active: 1986–present
- Height: 5 ft 9 in (175 cm)

Dinesh Kaushik (born 27 May 1957) is an Indian actor. He is a post graduate in Indian theatre from the Punjab University, Chandigarh. He has worked with professional theatre groups in Mumbai. He has appeared in many advertisements, television shows and movies. He is currently playing Narsinghrao Pradhanmantri (the prime minister of Jhansi) in Jhansi Ki Rani (Zee TV). He has acted in Raghukul Reet Sada Chali Aayi on Doordarshan.

== Career ==
He is a TV actor, who started his career with theatre, and took active part in Majma and Ekjute theatre groups, respectively. He became a household face with television commercials. Dinesh Kaushik has been the face for leading brands including Godrej Interio, Rustomjee, Cadbury, Thumbs Up, Tree Top, Keo-Karpin, Mayur Suitings, Vicks, Hero Honda Motor Bikes, Surf, and Girnar Tea. He moved his concentration towards television serials and movies. He has appeared in the T-series video album Main Pardesi Hoon.

== Personal life ==
He is married to Ragini and has two daughters Ruchika and Simran.

== Television ==
- Jhansi Ki Rani on Zee TV
- Pancham on Zee TV
- 1993 Commander on Zee TV
- Hip Hip Hurray on Zee TV
- Parampara on Zee TV
- Ghar Ki Lakshmi Betiyaan on Zee TV
- Tum Bin Jaaoon Kahaan on Zee TV
- X Zone on Zee TV
- Kora Kagaz on Star Plus
- Kumkum - Ek Pyara Sa Bandhan on Star Plus
- Meri Awaz Ko Mil Gayi Roshni on Star Plus
- Kyunki Saas Bhi Kabhi Bahu Thi on Star Plus
- Raaz...Ki Ek Baatt on Doordarshan
- Raghukul Reet Sada Chali Aayi on Doordarshan
- Kuntee on SAB TV
- Bahadur Shah Zafar (TV series) on Doordarshan
- Mahabharat on Doordarshan
- Anugoonj on Doordarshan
- Shiv Maha Puran on Doordarshan
- Swabhimaan on Doordarshan
- Remix on StarOne
- Ssshhhh...Koi Hai on StarOne
- Ssshhhh...Phir Koi Hai on StarOne
- Vaidehi on Sony TV
- Par Is Dil Ko Kaise Samjhae on Sony TV
- C.I.D on Sony TV
- Aahat on Sony TV
- Saaya on Sony TV Special Appearance from episode no 41-45
- Zameen Se Aassman Tak on Sahara TV
- Punarvivaah on Zee TV
- Main Lakshmi Tere Aangan Ki on Life Ok
- Tujh Sang Preet Lagai Sajna on Sahara One
- Choti Sarrdaarni on Colors
- Vish on Colors

== Films ==
- Ankush (1986) as Dave
- Sanchi Pritiya Hamar (1987)
- Aryan (1988) as Henchman
- Shadyantra (1989) as Anil Chowdary
- Prakope (1990)
- Jeena Teri Gali Mein (1991)
- Aaj Ka Goonda Raj (1992) as Raja's Friend
- Jo Jeeta Wahi Sikandar (1992)
- Bedardi (1993) as Bharat Desai
- Gopalaa (1993) as Dr Dandekar
- Mahakaal (1993) as Randheer
- Dilwale (1994) as Mental Hospital Patient
- Karan (1994)
- Sarfarosh (1999) as Roshan Nagrath
- Badhaai Ho Badhaai (2002) as Anthany D'Souza
- Tere Naam (2003) as Aatmaram
- Madhoshi (2004) as Nakul
- Vaada (2005)
- Bhoot Unkle (2006) as Principal
- 3rd Eye (2019)
- Romeo S3 (2025) as Home Minister
