= Shyam Pathak =

Indian actor and comedian

- Born: Shyam Pathak; 12 June 1972 (age 54); Mumbai, Maharashtra, India
- Education: National School of Drama
- Occupations: Actor, comedian
- Years active: 2004–present
- Known for: Popatlal in Taarak Mehta Ka Ooltah Chashmah
- Children: 3

Shyam Pathak (born 12 June 1972) is an Indian actor and comedian. He is best known for portraying Patrakaar Popatlal in the long-running Hindi television sitcom Taarak Mehta Ka Ooltah Chashmah. He also acted in 2007 erotic espionage period film Lust, Caution.

== Career ==
Since 2009, he has been portraying Patrakaar Popatlal in Taarak Mehta Ka Ooltah Chashmah.

== Filmography ==
=== Films ===
Year	Film	Language	Role
2007	Lust, Caution	Mandarin	Jewelry Shopkeeper

=== Television ===
Year	Serial	Role	Ref.
2004	Jassi Jaisi Koi Nahin	Raddiwala	
2008–2009	Jasuben Jayantilaal Joshi Ki Joint Family	Rajendra Jayantilal Joshi	
2009–2010	Sukh By Chance	Dheeraj Mehta	
2009–present	Taarak Mehta Ka Ooltah Chashmah	Patrakar Popatlal Pandey	
