= Dhruv Tara – Samay Sadi Se Pare =

Indian fantasy television series

- Also known as: Dhruv Tara
- Genre: Sci-fi; Drama; Fantasy; Romance
- Created by: Shashi Mittal; Sumeet Mittal
- Screenplay by: Amit Senchoudhary
- Story by: Vikram Khurana; Pankhuri Gangawal; Timir Kireet Bakshi
- Directed by: Vaibhav Singh; Pushkar Pandit
- Creative director: Aseem Kalra
- Starring: See below
- Opening theme: "Dhruv Tara"
- Composers: Lalit Sen; Souvyk Chakraborty
- Country of origin: India
- Original language: Hindi
- No. of seasons: 1
- No. of episodes: 456

Production
- Producers: Shashi Mittal; Sumeet Mittal; Jitendra Singla
- Cinematography: Mangesh Mahadik
- Editor: Prashant Rai
- Camera setup: Multi-camera
- Running time: 19-25 minutes
- Production company: Shashi Sumeet Productions

Original release
- Network: Sony SAB; Sony LIV
- Release: 27 February 2023 – 10 August 2024

Dhruv Tara – Samay Sadi Se Pare (transl. Pole Star – Beyond Time and Centuries) is an Indian Sci-fi Fantasy Romantic Drama television series that aired from 27 February 2023 to 10 August 2024 on Sony SAB. Produced by Shashi Mittal and Sumeet Mittal under Shashi Sumeet Productions, it starred Ishhan Dhawan and Riya Sharma.

== Plot ==
Tarapriya, a princess of 17th century time travels to 21st century to find cure for her brother's brain clot and she cross path with Dr. Dhruv. After struggling a lot, she finally becomes successful to convince Dhruv to help her. Meanwhile, Dhruv and Tara fakes their marriage on Preeti's request and Dhruv develops feelings for Tara. Later, they overcomes all the hurdles created by Tarun and time travels to 17th century. After reaching Vallabhghar, Dhruv successfully completes Mahaveer's operation with the help of Tara amidst all the hurdles created by Samrat. Afterwards, Dhruv confesses his love for Tara and she reciprocates. Although Samrat creates problems for them but eventually they exposes him and Udaybhan announces their marriage. As a result, Dhruv and Tara gets cursed by the time portal. Because of which, Dhruv's existence from 21st century gets erased and Tara's father gets killed by Samrat. Then Dhruv is accused of Udaybhan's murder and he gets death penalty but Anusiya saves him. Meanwhile, Lord Krishna appears as Ranchod to guide Dhruv and Tara. Dhruv leaves for 21st century on his suggestion.

Tara announces her Swayamvara to catch Dhruv and he comes back from 21st century but in disguise of Nayak and proves his innocence to Tara with the help of Ranchod and defeats Samrat and Tilotma. Afterwards, Mahaveer gets them married and they leave for the 21st century.

Dhruv and Tara time travels to 17th century on the occasion of Raksha Bandhan but earthquake occurs and destroys Vallabhghar. As a result, Dhruv and Tara gets separated. Later, Tara finds out that she's pregnant with Dhruv's child. Afterwards, she's attacked by a group of goons but Devgarh's king Suryapratap arrives and saves her life and takes her with him in his kingdom. But there, she slips into coma.

Dhruv is trying to find the time portal to bring back Tara meanwhile Tara gives birth to a baby boy in the state of coma and Suryapratap names him Shaurya. After few days, she wakes up from coma and decides to leave but seeing Shaurya's attachment with Suryapratap, she stays back.

Tara is living with the name of Antara in Devgarh with her and Dhruv's son, Shaurya. Meanwhile, Dhruv is living with Saraswati in 21st century and has established a hospital after the name of Tara. After a lot of events, Dhruv and Tara comes face to face and he learns about Shaurya being his son. Suryapratap also learns about the relationship of Dhruv and Tara. So he conspiracies against Dhruv but Tara learns the truth of Suryapratap and saves Dhruv but he gets into a fight with Suryapratap and while stopping them, Tara falls down from a cliff.

Dhruv finally finds out Tara but she has lost her memory and assumes herself as Bijli, a dancer. Dhruv takes her in Devgarh but there the royal family doesn't believe that she's Tara and humiliates her a lot so she leaves. Meanwhile, Bijli goes back to the palace as a hostage of Kapali to kill Suryapratap but Dhruv manages to stop her. Then Suryapratap lies to her being his wife to separate Dhruv and Bijli but eventually she learns the truth and decides to run away with Dhruv. Suryapratap learns about it and makes Dhruv mentally unstable. Mahaveer killed Suryapratap. Later, there is a dispute between Mahaveer and Tara.

== Cast ==
=== Main ===
- Riya Sharma as
  - Tarapriya "Tara" Singh Saxena: Princess of Vallabhgarh and an aspiring ayurvedic doctor; Saraswati and Udaybhan's daughter (2023–2024)
  - Tara Shastri: Chandra's adoptive sister (2024)
- Ishhan Dhawan as
  - Dr. Dhruv Saxena: Neurosurgeon; Lalita and Sanjay's elder son (2023–2024)
  - Dhruv Seth: Musician; Indrani and Giriraj's son (2024)

=== Recurring ===
- Narayani Shastri as Saraswati Singh: Former Queen and Royal Mother of Vallabhgarh; Udaybhan's widow (2023–2024)
- Krishna Bharadwaj as Mahaveer Singh: King of Vallabhgarh; Saraswati and Udaybhan's son (2023; 2024)
- Yash Tonk as Udaybhan Singh: Former King of Vallabhgarh; Saraswati's husband; Mahaveer and Tara's father; Dhruv's father-in-law; Shaurya's maternal grandfather (2023)
- Vineet Kumar Chaudhary as Samrat Singh: Former Senapati of Vallabhgarh; Tara and Dhruv's rival; Tara's former one-sided obsessive lover and fiancé; Tilottama's lover (2023)
- Krutika Desai as Anusuya: Nagarseth's daughter; Mahaveer's ex–fiancée and love-interest; Tara's best friend (2023)
  - Benazir Shaikh replaced Desai as Anusuya. (2023)
- Neelima Singh as Susheela Saxena: Vidya's daughter; Ravi's estranged wife; Dhruv's aunt and adoptive mother; Tara's mother-in law; Shaurya's paternal grandaunt (2023)
- Harsh Vashisht as Ravi Saxena: Sanjay's younger brother; Susheela's estranged husband; Dhruv's uncle and adoptive father (2023)
- Abha Parmar as Vidya: Susheela's mother; Dhruv's adoptive grandmother; Shaurya's adoptive great-grandmother (2023)
- Gulfam Khan as Lalita Saxena: Sanjay's wife; Dhruv, Jay, Khatti and Meethi's mother (2023)
- Vijay Kalvani as Sanjay Saxena: Ravi's elder brother; Lalita's husband; Dhruv, Jay, Khatti and Meethi's father (2023)
- Susheel Parashar as Mr. Saxena: Sanjay and Ravi's father; Dhruv, Jay, Khatti and Meethi's grandfather (2023)
- Tanay Aul as Dr. Jay Saxena: Lalita and Sanjay's younger son; Dhruv's younger brother; Khatti and Meethi's elder brother; Ayesha's husband (2023)
- Swati Kapoor as Ayesha Malhotra Saxena: Jay's wife; Dhruv's former one-sided-lover (2023)
- Ashish Kaul as Mr. Malhotra: Ayesha's father (2023)
- Drisha Kalyani as Khatti Saxena: Lalita and Sanjay's elder daughter; Dhruv and Jay's younger sister; Meethi's elder sister (2023)
- Milky Srivastav as Mithi Saxena: Lalita and Sanjay's younger daughter; Dhruv, Jay and Khatti's younger sister (2023)
- Het Makwana as Prince: Informally adopted son of the Saxena family (2023)
- Amit Pachori as Tarun Shukla: An archaeologist; Preeti's elder brother; Tara and Dhruv's rival (2023)
- Akshita Singh Rajput as Preeti Shukla: Tarun's younger sister; Tara and Dhruv's friend (2023)
- Jiya Solanki as Sukanya: A girl from Vallabhgarh who idolise Tara; Tara and Dhruv's friend (2023–2024)
  - Ayesha Vindhara as young Sukanya (2023)
- Vinod Kapoor as Maharishi (2023)
- Neha Harsora as Tilottama: A former maid at Vallabhgarh; Mahaveer's ex-wife; Former Queen of Vallabhgarh; Samrat's lover (2023)
- V S Prince Ratann as Royal Soldier: A Close Informant of Rajkumari Tarapriya (2023)
- Ulka Gupta as Rajkumari Shyammohini Singh: Rajkumari of Vikramgarh; Vikramjeet's daughter; Dhruv's former one sided obsessive lover (2023)
- Manish Khanna as Vikramjeet Singh: King of Vikramgarh; Rajkumari Shyammohini's father (2023)
- Siddharth Arora as Krishna / Ranchod (2023)
- Karan Grover as Suryapratap Singh: King of Devgarh; Durgavati's nephew; Maan and Meenakshi's elder cousin; Shaurya's foster father; Tara's ex-one sided obsessive lover (2023–2024)
- Indira Krishnan as Durgavati aka Bhabhosa: Rajmata of Devgarh; Suryapratap's aunt; Maan and Meenakshi's mother (2023–2024)
- Kajol Srivastav as Meenakshi Singh: Princess of Devgarh; Durgavati's daughter; Suryapratap's younger cousin; Maan's younger sister; Dhruv’s ex-one sided lover and friend; Mahaveer's second wife (2023–2024)
- Anuj Sachdeva as Maan Singh: Prince of Devgarh; Durgavati's son; Suryapratap's younger cousin; Meenakshi's elder brother; Sona and Chandi's husband (2023–2024)
- Neha Kaul as Sona Maan Singh: Maan's first wife (2023–2024)
- Simran Simmi as Chandi Maan Singh: Maan's second wife (2023–2024)
- Evan Dixit as Shaurya Saxena: Dhruv and Tara's son; Prince of Devgarh; Suryapratap's adopted son (2023–2024)
- Shreya Patel as Dolly: Dhruv and Tara's friend (2024)
- Pankaj Dheer as Giriraj Seth: Rajrani and Indrani's husband; Dhruv and Rishi's father (2024)
- Neelu Vaghela as Rajrani Seth: Giriraj's second wife; Dhruv and Rishi's step-mother (2024)
- Ravi Gossain as Raviraj Seth: Dhruv's uncle (2024)
- Monica Khanna as Urvashi Seth: Dhruv's sister in law; Rishi's wife(2024)
- Rashmi Gupta as Chandra: Tara's adoptive sister; Dhruv's ex-fiancé (2024)
- Worship Khanna as Birju: Dhruv's friend (2024)
- Manraj Singh Sarma as Rishiraj Seth: Giriraj and Indrani's elder son; Dhruv's brother; Urvashi's husband (2024)

== Production ==
The series was announced on Sony SAB by Shashi Sumeet Productions. Ishhan Dhawan as Dhruv and Riya Sharma as Tarapriya were signed as the leads. Set in Agra, shooting of the series started in December 2022, with Narayani Shastri and Yash Tonk joining the cast as the parallel leads. It was Yash and Narayani were first appearance together, previously both were seen with their partners in the dance reality show Nach Baliye - Season 2. The promo featuring the leads was released on 23 December 2022.

In January 2023, Swati Kapoor was cast to portray a negative role and was joined by Vineet Kumar Chaudhary and Krishna Bharadwaj.

== Awards and nominations ==
| Year | Award | Category | Nominee | Result |
|---|---|---|---|---|
| 2026 | Ngôi Sao Xanh 2025 (Green Star Awards) | Most Popular Foreign Actor (Male) | Ishhan Dhawan | Won |
| 2026 | Ngôi Sao Xanh 2025 (Green Star Awards) | Most Popular Foreign Actor (Female) | Riya Sharma | Won |

== See also ==
- List of programmes broadcast by Sony SAB
