= Shresth Kumar =

Indian television actor (born 1988)

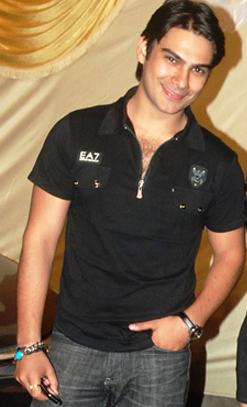
- Born: 1988 (age 37–38); Delhi, India
- Occupation: Actor
- Years active: 2009-present

Shresth Kumar (born 1988) is an Indian television actor. He is known for playing the role of Sunny in Sawaare Sabke Sapne... Preeto on Imagine TV. He currently portrays Neeraj in Kaal Bhairav Rahasya on Star Bharat.

== Career ==
Shresth made his acting debut on the Imagine TV show Kitani Mohabbat Hai as Salil Mittal. He was last seen in Sapne Suhane Ladakpan Ke as Aditya on Zee TV.

== Television ==
Year	Title	Role	Ref(s)
2009	Raghukul Reet Sada Chali Aayi	Rajesh Khanna's Son	
2009	Kitani Mohabbat Hai	Salil Mittal	
2009–2010	Bairi Piya	Radhe	
2010	Roomies		
2010–2012	Na Aana Is Des Laado	Aditya Gajendar Sangwan	
2011	Sanjog Se Bani Sangini		
2012	Sawaare Sabke Sapne... Preeto	Sunny	
2012	Hum Ne Li Hai... Shapath	Cameo	
2012	Love Marriage Ya Arranged Marriage	Mansi's coach	
2012–2013	Sapne Suhane Ladakpan Ke	Aditya	
2013	Adaalat	Akash Talwar/Rajat Malhotra	
2013–2014	Ek Boond Ishq	Yug	
2014	Sanskaar – Dharohar Apnon Ki	Gaurav	
2014	Saath Nibhaana Saathiya	Vivaan Khanna	
2014	Encounter	Ameya	
2015	Maharakshak Devi	Krishna	
2015	Love by Chance		
2015–2016	Mere Angne Mein	Vyom Sinha	
2016	Shiksha: Ek Mazboot Aadharshila		
2016	Sahaab Ji		
2016	Suryaputra Karn	Samba	
2016–2018	Udaan	Chagan Lakhan Singh	
2018	Laal Ishq	Anup Agnihotri	
2018–2019	Kaal Bhairav Rahasya Season 2	Neeraj Singh / Abhiram Pratap Singh	
2019	Paramavatar Shri Krishna	Paundraka Vasudeva	
2021	Crime Alert	Episodic Role	
2023	Agnisakshi…Ek Samjhauta	Utkarsh Bhosle	
2023	Jahan Chaand Rehta Hai	Veer	
2023	Swaraj	Alluri Sitarama Raju	
2025	Jhanak	Jeet	
2025	Ishani	Jeet	

== Filmography ==
Year	Title	Role	Director	Refs
2018	Dhappa	Main Lead	Siddharth Nagar	
2018	Sholey Girl	Main Lead	–	Zee5
2018	Keep Smiling	Main Lead	–	Short Film
