= Blind Game =

2026 Indian film by Sangeeth Sivan

- Official release poster
- Directed by: Sangeeth Sivan
- Produced by: Anuj Sharma. Deepak Mukut
- Starring: Arjun Rampal; Priyamani; Rohit Chandel
- Cinematography: Deep Sawant
- Edited by: Sandeep Kurup
- Production companies: Zee Studios; Soham Rockstar Entertainment; ThunderSky Entertainment
- Distributed by: Zee 5
- Release date: 11 November 2026
- Running time: 120 minutes
- Country: India
- Language: Hindi

Blind Game is a 2026 Indian Hindi-language crime thriller film directed by Sangeeth Sivan and produced by Dinesh Mukut and Anuj Sharma under the banner of Soham Rockstar Entertainment. It stars Arjun Rampal, Priyamani and Rohit Chandel in lead roles. The film is a Hindi remake of the Malayalam thriller 7th Day and follows an IPS officer drawn into an investigation involving a group of friends and missing cash. The film premiered on 11 November 2026 on Zee 5.

== Plot ==
A suspended IPS officer investigates a series of suspicious events involving a group of friends and a missing sum of ₹5 crore. As the case develops, he uncovers secrets, deception, and unexpected revelations.

== Cast ==
- Arjun Rampal as Sikander Singh IPS,Crime Branch(imposter)/ David Walter Williams (real), dreaded crime lord, mastermind of the counterfeit currency racket and chief of goon Rangtta- the main antagonist
- Priyamani as Inspector later DSP Yamini Thakur, David Walter Williams secret accomplice (secondary antagonist)
- Rohit Chandel as Vikrant Verma (Vicky)
- Nakul Roshan Sahdev as Jerry
- Shayank Shukla as Burger
- Akash Makhija as Shaan Rehman,a journalist
- Mahesh Pillai as Rangtta,David Walter Williams chief goon
- Noyrika Bhateja as Jessica

== Production ==
Principal photography began in 2022. It was extensively shot in Manali, Himachal Pradesh. It was originally scheduled for release in 2024 but it got delayed after director Sangeeth Sivan passed away.

== Release ==
The film is scheduled to premiere for free in the Free 5 category on Zee 5 on 11 November 2026.

== Reception ==
Mashable India gave the film 2.5 out of 5 stars. It found the opening suspenseful and appreciated the background score and dialogues, while praising the on-screen dynamic between Rampal and Priyamani. It, however, felt that the plot became predictable towards the end and that several mountain and forest sequences appeared rushed. Scroll.in described the film as barely qualifying as a timepasser, but acknowledged that Rampal and Priyamani were exceptions to its otherwise weak performances. The review also said that a few twists and chase sequences were enough to sustain the film's 113-minute runtime. IGN India called the film a strong crime-thriller idea that falls short in execution. It praised Rampal and Priyamani for their sincere performances, but criticised the screenplay for not developing the friendships, for including too many subplots, poorly sketched characters, awkward dialogue and unnecessary twists. Eastern Eye argued that its execution did not match its ambition. The review criticised the underdeveloped characters and excessive twists, noting that the promising opening lost momentum as subplots took over.

The Hollywood Reporter India gave a strongly negative review. It criticised the amateur plotting, technical execution, editing, dubbing and sound effects, and said that the performances were undermined by wooden writing. The Tribune also reviewed the film negatively, writing that Rampal's screen presence could not compensate for a weak plot. It described the narrative and characters as uninteresting and called the film "simply bad". Bollywood Hungama gave the film 1.5 out of 5 stars. While it acknowledged that Rampal tried to rise above the flawed script and that Priyamani put in a sincere effort, it criticised the film's illogical script and unconvincing twists. The Free Press Journal gave the film 1 out of 5 stars, calling it a poorly executed adaptation of 7th Day. It criticised the directionless script, sluggish pacing and lacklustre performances, while also saying that Rampal appeared "half sleepy and bored" in his scenes.
