= Krishna Bharadwaj (actor) =

Indian television actor

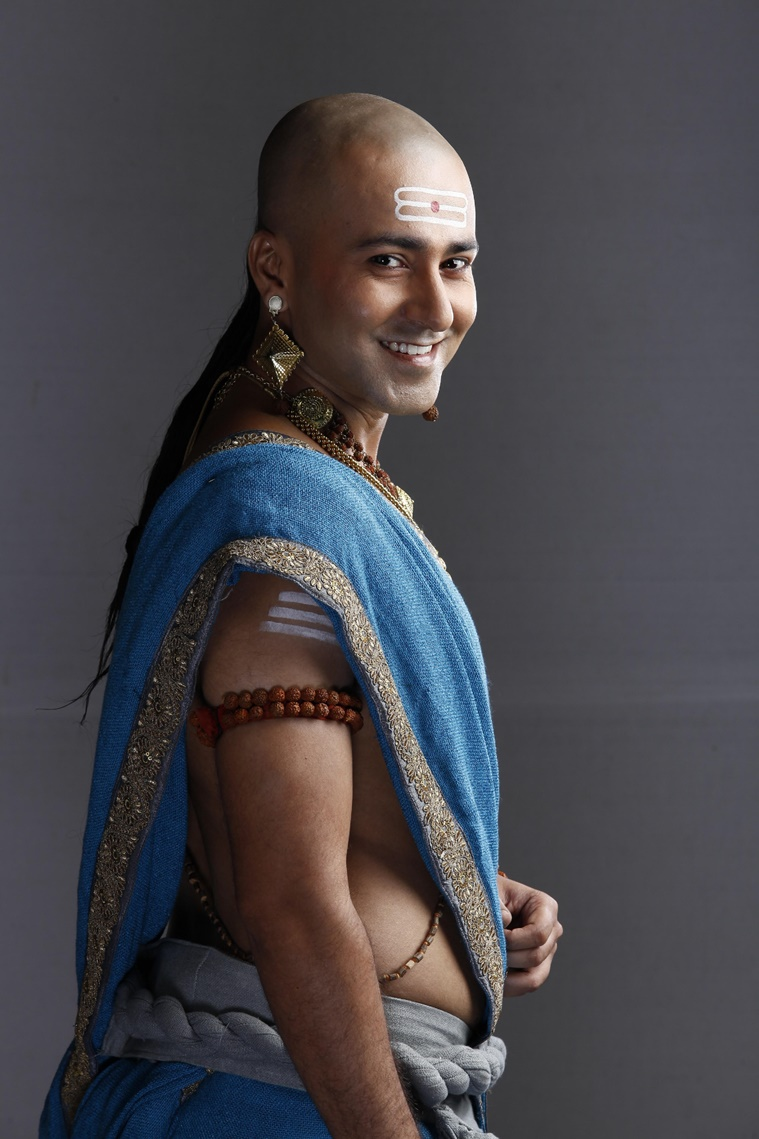
- Bharadwaj in Tenali Rama
- Born: 18 July 1983 (age 43); Ranchi, Bihar (present–day Jharkhand), India
- Occupation: Actor
- Years active: 2005–present
- Known for: Tenali Rama

Krishna Bharadwaj is an Indian television actor born in Ranchi, Jharkhand. He is best known for portraying the titular role in Tenali Rama for Sony SAB. He is also known for his roles in Jasuben Jayantilaal Joshi Ki Joint Family, Sukh By Chance, R. K. Laxman Ki Duniya and Dhruv Tara – Samay Sadi Se Pare, among others, and has appeared in the Gujarati film Chal Man Jeetva Jaiye.

== Early life ==
Krishna Bharadwaj was born on 18 July 1983 in Ranchi, Jharkhand, where his father Dr. Aniket Bharadwaj is a writer, director, and actor associated with theatre in Jharkhand. He began acting at the age of four and was associated with Akashvani, where he performed in radio programmes. He has also trained in various dance forms, including Bharatanatyam, which he studied for seven years. He later moved to Mumbai to pursue a career in acting and received training at the Roshan Taneja School of Acting, where he subsequently taught for around one and a half years. His early exposure to performance and storytelling influenced his interest in acting and writing.

== Career ==
Krishna Bharadwaj began his television career with ADA (2005), followed by roles in Kashmakash Zindagi Ki (2006–2009), Jasuben Jayantilaal Joshi Ki Joint Family (2008–2009) and Sukh By Chance (2009–2010). He later appeared in shows such as Kasak (2009–2011), R. K. Laxman Ki Duniya (2011–2013), Piya Basanti Re (2014), and Bahu Hamari Rajni Kant (2016).

Before gaining wider recognition, he experienced a period of limited acting opportunities. In an interview with The Times of India, he stated that he was out of work for four years, during which he turned to theatre, an experience that later helped him in his acting career.

He gained prominence for portraying the titular role of Pandit Ramakrishna in Tenali Rama (2017–2020), for which he shaved his head. He also played a dual role in the show, portraying Rama's son Bhaskar. The show became a significant milestone in his career. He reprised the role of Tenali Rama in Tenali Rama 2.0 (2024–2025).

In 2023–2024, Bharadwaj played Maharaj Mahaveer Singh in Dhruv Tara – Samay Sadi Se Pare, and later portrayed Lord Krishna in the Gujarati television show Shyam Dhun Laagi Re (2024–2025).

In 2026, he joined Hui Gumm Yaadein Ek Doctor, Do Zindagiyaan in a cameo role as Satendra Tiwari (Sattu), a man believed to be possessed by the spirit of his deceased wife. The role required him to portray both Sattu and his wife's persona, making it one of his more complex television roles.

Apart from television, Bharadwaj has appeared in Gujarati films, including Chal Man Jeetva Jaiye (2017) and its sequel Chal Man Jeetva Jaiye 2 (2023), as well as Vishwaguru (2025).

In addition to acting, he has also worked as a writer, assistant director, creative director, and casting director. He co-wrote the Gujarati film Chal Man Jeetva Jaiye, in which he also played the lead role.

== Filmography ==
=== Films ===
Year	Title	Role	Language	Notes	Reference
2017	Chal Man Jeetva Jaiye	Dev Sanghvi	Gujarati	Main lead & Co-writer	
2023	Chal Man Jeetva Jaiye 2	Dev Sanghvi	Gujarati	Main lead	
2025	Vishwaguru	Rudra	Gujarati	Main lead	

=== Television ===
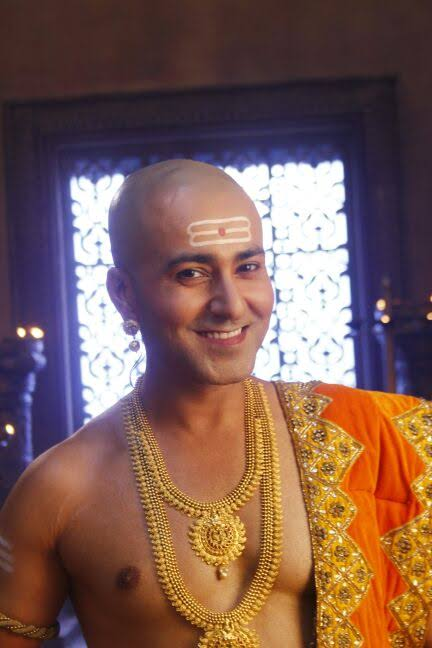
Krishna Bharadwaj playing as Tenali Rama

Year	Serial	Role	Channel
2005	ADA	Jignesh	Sahara One
2006–2009	Kashmakash Zindagi Ki	Aditya	DD National
2008–2009	Jasuben Jayantilaal Joshi Ki Joint Family	Pinakin Joshi	Imagine TV
2009–2010	Sukh By Chance	Akash	Sony Entertainment Television
2009–2011	Kasak	Ballu	DD National
2011–2013	R. K. Laxman Ki Duniya	Piyush Vasavda	Sony SAB
2014	Piya Basanti Re	Himesh	Sony Pal
2016	Bahu Hamari Rajni Kant	Balwant	Life OK
2016	Baalveer	Rangeela	Sony SAB
2017–2020	Tenali Rama	Pandit Ramakrishna	Sony SAB
2019–2020	Tenali Rama	Bhaskar	Sony SAB
2020	Kuch Smiles Ho Jayein... With Alia	Pandit Ramakrishna	Sony SAB
2023- 2024	Dhruv Tara – Samay Sadi Se Pare	Maharaj Mahaveer Singh	Sony SAB
2024–2025	Shyam Dhun Laagi Re	Krishna	Colors Gujarati
2024-2025	Tenali Rama 2.0	Pandit Ramakrishna	Sony SAB
2026	Hui Gumm Yaadein Ek Doctor, Do Zindagiyaan	Satendra Tiwari (Sattu)	Sony SAB
