= Doree (TV series) =

Indian drama television series

- Genre: social issue family drama
- Created by: Jay Mehta
- Screenplay by: Aanchal Vasani
- Story by: Lakshmi Jayakumar; Shashwat Rai
- Starring: See below
- Opening theme: Rishton Ki Yeh... Doree Hai
- Country of origin: India
- Original language: Hindi
- No. of seasons: 2
- No. of episodes: 336

Production
- Camera setup: Multi camera
- Running time: 21-46 minutes
- Production company: Jay Productions

Original release
- Network: Colors TV
- Release: 6 November 2023 – 20 June 2025

Doree (transl. Chord) is an Indian Hindi-language drama television series that aired from 6 November 2023 on Colors TV and streams digitally on JioHotstar. The first season starred Mahi Bhanushali, Amar Upadhyay and Sudha Chandran and ended on 26 June 2024. The second season premiered on 21 January 2025, with Priyanshi Yadav as Doree alongside Ishhan Dhawan, Upadhyay and Sreejita De and ended on 20 June 2025. The series aims to promote awareness on the issue of girl child abandonment.

== Seasons overview ==
Season	Episodes	Originally aired	
Season	Episodes	First aired	Last aired
1	227	6 November 2023	26 June 2024
2	109	21 January 2025	20 June 2025

== Plot ==
=== Season 1 ===
Doree, a six-year-old girl, who lives in a village where women are largely marginalized, especially in professions such as weaving, traditionally reserved for men. From the first episode, Doree is portrayed as a determined and intelligent child, who does not accept the limitations imposed by her gender. The series opens with Doree's initial struggles to make a place for herself in the textile world. As a baby, she is rescued by Ganga Prasad, a poor weaver with a paralysed left arm, who becomes one of her main supporters. She grows up with him and sees him as her father. However, she faces strong opposition from Kailashi Devi, a powerful matriarchal figure, who sees Doree as a threat to the established order. Tensions rise as Doree begins to question the community's practices. As the series progresses, Doree faces even greater challenges. It is revealed that Kailashi Devi is actually Rukmani, who had taken her twin sister's place after trying to burn her alive. Rukmani is driven by jealousy and a desire for power, which leads her to manipulate those around Doree. The plot becomes more intense as new threats arise. Doree faces assassination attempts orchestrated by Rukmani, who sees her as an obstacle to her own ambitions. Family conflicts escalate when Doree discovers that members of her family are involved in plots against her. Despite this, she manages to gain allies among her community members, especially through her determination and her ability to solve problems with intelligence. The end of the series is marked by a final battle between Doree and her antagonists. Rukmani makes one last attempt to destroy Doree, but her plans fail, thanks to the support of Ganga Prasad and other allies. The final episode shows Doree triumphing not only in her fight for gender equality, but also in establishing her own textile business, which becomes a model of success for the community. The series ends on a positive note, albeit tinged with melancholy, as Doree had to face significant sacrifices to achieve her goals. She becomes a symbol of resilience and hope, not only for the women in her village, but for the entire region.

=== Season 2 ===
The story follows the now 22-year-old Doree, a young woman who challenges the traditional norms and strives to empower local weavers. Her life changes when she rescues an abandoned baby, Shubhi, from the river, just as Ganga had once rescued her. The show initially focused on Doree's struggle as an unwed single mother, facing the harsh societal hurdles. She earns money by weaving sarees and selling them. Due to her profession, she faces off with Rajnandani Thakur, whose family has dominance in the handloom community. Rajnandani sees Doree as a threat to her power and plots against her.

Later on, Doree marries Advocate Maan Thakur, Rajnandani's cousin, to save her father from false murder charges. Unbeknownst to Doree, Shubhi is the daughter of the Thakur family. Rajnandani, who dreams of controlling the Thakur family and making her son, Pratham, the sole heir, switched her child with her brother Deep's newborn baby. She then throws the baby into the river, which had been witnessed by Ganga. She then frames Ganga in Neelu's murder as Neelu also knew she was the one that abandoned Shubhi. As the show progresses, Rajnandani realizes that Doree rescued Shubhi and feels threatened that her truth would be exposed. She plots to get Doree and Shubhi kicked outside of the house, but fails each time. On the other hand, after marriage, Doree starts her journey of unveiling Thakur family's dark secrets, one of which is related to her father Ganga. It is revealed that Maan's mother is alive and was kept in a mental asylum for years by Ambika Thakur, as she was jealous of her. Ganga is falsely accused of killing Meera years ago, but Doree exposes Ambika and brings Meera home.

== Cast ==
=== Main ===
- Priyanshi Yadav as Doree Thakur: Manasi and Anand's daughter; Ganga's adopted daughter; Neetu's step-daughter; Parvati's half-sister; Maan's wife; Shubhi's aunt and adoptive mother (2025)
  - Mahi Bhanushali as Child Doree Thakur (2023-2024; 2025)
- Amar Upadhyay as Ganga "Agni" Thakur: Mahendra and Kailashi's son; Rukmani's stepson; Yash, Anand and Raj's half-brother; Manasi's widower; Doree's adoptive father; Shubhi's adoptive grandfather (2023–2024; 2025)
- Sudha Chandran as
  - Rukmani Thakur / Fake Kailashi Thakur: Kailashi's twin sister; Mahendra's second wife; Yash, Anand, Raj and Maya's mother; Ganga's stepmother; Doree and Parvati's grandmother; Vansh's adoptive grandmother (2023–2024; 2025)
  - Kailashi Thakur: Rukmani's twin sister; Mahendra's first wife; Ganga's mother; Yash, Anand and Raj's stepmother; Doree and Parvati's step-grandmother (2024)
- Ishhan Dhawan as Advocate Maan Thakur: Meera and Surendra's son; Rajnandini and Deep's cousin; Doree's husband; Shubi's uncle and adoptive father (2025)
- Sreejita De as Rajnandini Thakur: Ambika and Vijendra's daughter; Deep's sister; Maan's cousin; Pratham's mother; Neelu's murderer (2025) (Dead)

=== Recurring ===
- Toral Rasputra as Manasi Singh Thakur: Veerendra's younger sister; Anand's ex-wife; Ganga's wife; Doree's mother; Vansh's adoptive mother (2023–2024) (Dead)
- Anurag Sharma as Anand Thakur: Mahendra and Rukmani's second son; Yash and Raj's brother; Ganga's half-brother; Manasi's ex–husband; Neelu's widower; Doree and Parvati's father; Vansh's adoptive father (2023–2024; 2025)
- Atharv Jhonny as Vansh "Lalla" Thakur: Anand and Manasi's adopted son (2023–2024)
- Uma Basu as Nani: Ganga's adoptive grandmother (2023–2024) (Dead)
- Mehul Buch as Mahendra Thakur: Kailashi and Rukmani's husband; Ganga, Yash, Anand and Raj's father; Doree and Parvati's grandfather; Vansh's adoptive grandfather (2023–2024)
- Soni Singh as Neelu Thakur: Anand's second wife; Doree's stepmother; Parvati's mother (2023–2024; 2025) (Dead)
- Haelyn Shastri as Komal Thakur: Raj's wife (2023–2024)
- Anurag Vyas as Raj Thakur: Mahendra and Rukmani's youngest son; Yash and Anand's brother; Ganga's half-brother; Komal's husband (2023–2024)
- Sugandha Srivastava as Sudha Thakur: Yash's wife (2023–2024)
- Mehul Kajaria as Yash Thakur: Mahendra and Rukmani's eldest son; Anand and Raj's brother; Ganga's half-brother; Sudha's husband (2023–2024)
- Moonmoon Banerjee as Maya: Agni's (Ganga) fake/adoptive sister; Rukmani's daughter (2024) (Dead)
- Ashwani Rathore as Chakaram: Thakur's maid (2023–2024)
- Rohit Agrawal as Sattu: Doree's friend (2025)
  - Hardik Mehta as Child Sattu (2023–2024)
- Anuradha Nandini as Inspector Bhairavi Tomar: A police officer (2023–2024)
- Milan Dhamecha as Reporter (2024)
- Sonal Vengurlekar as Pavitra: Ganga's ex–girlfriend and fake wife; Flora's mother (2024)
- Mahi Bhadra as Flora: Pavitra's daughter; Ganga's fake daughter (2024)
- Hemant Choudhary as Veerendra Singh: Manasi's elder brother (2024)
- Anushri as Baby Shubhi Thakur: Pushpa and Deep's daughter; Doree and Maan's adopted daughter; Pratham's cousin (2025)
- Zaid Shaikh as Baby Pratham Thakur: Rajnandini's son; Deep and Pushpa's adopted son; Shubhi's cousin (2025)
- Unknown as Parvati "Paro" Thakur: Neetu and Anand's daughter; Doree's half-sister (2025)
- Farida Dadi as Dadi: Vijendra and Surendra's mother; Rajnandini, Maan and Deep's grandmother; Shubhi and Pratham's great-grandmother (2025)
- Utkarsha Naik as Ambika Thakur: Vijendra's wife; Rajnandini and Deep's mother; Shubhi and Pratham's grandmother (2025)
- Pankaj Vishnu as Vijendra Thakur: Ambika's husband; Rajnandini and Deep's father; Shubhi and Pratham's grandfather (2025)
- Sanjay Swaraj as Surendar Thakur: Meera's husband; Maan's father; Shubhi's adoptive grandfather (2025)
- Kashish Duggal as Meera Thakur: Surendar's wife; Maan's mother; Shubhi's adoptive grandmother (2025)
- Gultesham Khan as Deep Thakur: Vijendra and Ambika's son; Pushpa and Kavya's husband; Shubhi's father; Pratham's adoptive father (2025)
- Minakshi Kashyap as Pushpa Thakur: Deep's wife; Shubhi's mother; Pratham's adoptive mother (2025)
- Milan Singh as Kavya: Maan's obsessive lover; Deep's illegal second wife (2025)

== Production ==
Due to decrease in TRP, the show is scheduled to last aired on 26 June 2024. But however it is also planned to bring up the second season showcasing a new grown up Doree and her challenges against women empowerment.

In January 2025, the promo of Doree 2 was shown wherein Priyanshi Yadav is now playing the character of elder Doree which will eventually begin from 21 January 2025.

=== Casting ===
Karan Vohra were approached for the lead role, but Ishhan Dhawan was finalized for the role of Maan. Sreejita De was roped as Rajnandini Thakur, the main female antagonist. In the second season, Soni Singh who played Neelu in the first season reprise her role. Upadhyay also reprise him role, Ganga in second season. In February 2025, Upadhyay who known playing Ganga quit the show.

== See also ==
- List of programmes broadcast by Colors TV
- Beti Bachao Beti Padhao
- Female foeticide in India
- Bunkar: The Last of the Varanasi Weavers
- Gender inequality
