= Ishani (TV series) =

2025 Indian drama television series

- Genre: Romance; Drama
- Created by: Leena Gangopadhyay
- Developed by: Leena Gangopadhyay
- Written by: Leena Gangopadhyay
- Screenplay by: Leena Gangopadhyay
- Story by: Leena Gangopadhyay
- Directed by: Chirag Madhuram Singh; Yogesh Bhati
- Creative director: Garima Dimri
- Starring: Megha Chakraborty; Karam Rajpal; Richa Rathore; Aasiya Kazi; Shresth Kumar
- Country of origin: India
- Original language: Hindi
- No. of seasons: 1
- No. of episodes: 114

Production
- Executive producers: Nitin Solanki; Sanket M Vanzara; Rahul Gyaan Singh
- Producers: Leena Gangopadhyay; Saibal Bannerjee
- Editors: Sameer; Soumen
- Camera setup: Multi-camera
- Running time: 20 minutes
- Production company: Magic Moments Motion Pictures

Original release
- Network: StarPlus
- Release: 3 July – 28 October 2025

Related
- Jhanak; Bhole Baba Parkarega

Ishani is an Indian Hindi-language television drama series that aired from 3 July to 28 October 2025 on StarPlus and streams digitally on JioHotstar. A spin-off of Jhanak, It was produced by Leena Gangopadhyay under Magic Moments Motion Pictures, and stars Megha Chakraborty in the titular role of Ishani, Karam Rajpal and Richa Rathore.

== Plot ==
Once full of dreams, Ishani returns to college after marriage and motherhood; her journey is about second chances, hidden truths and whilst finding love and courage to live life on her terms again.The show presents the tale of a woman caught between what society expects of her and what her heart truly desires.

Ishani is now married to a man, named Shashwat Sengupta, who already has children, named Pihu and Yash. But even in her new home, happiness remains elusive. Ishani's in-laws and her husband, Shashwat mistreat her for no clear reason at all, and she continues to live under the weight of judgment and isolation. Despite everything, Ishani finds support in an unexpected place, her step-daughter, Pihu.

Encouraged, by Pihu's belief in Ishani, she decides to reclaim her life. She takes a bold step and resumes her education, hoping to finally realize the dreams of becoming an IPS officer that, she had once buried. But life throws another twist her way, when she enrolls in a college and comes face to face, with her past, her ex-boyfriend, Anurag, who is now a college professor at the same institution that, Ishani has enrolled in.

== Cast ==
=== Main ===
- Megha Chakraborty as Ishani Sengupta: An inspired IPS; Anurag's ex-girlfriend and love interest; Shashwat's estranged widow (2025)
- Karam Rajpal as Anurag Banarjee: An honest college professor; Ishani's ex-boyfriend and love interest; Pihu's former love interest (2025)

=== Recurring ===
- Richa Rathore as Pihu Sengupta: Siddharth's wife (2025)
- Pankaj Bijlani as Dr. Siddharth: An honest doctor; Pihu's husband (2025)
- Anupam Bhattacharya as Shashwat Sengupta: A dishonest businessman; Ishani's estranged abusive husband (2025)
- Aasiya Kazi as Nandini Mitra Sengupta: An honest businesswoman; Shouvik's widow (2025)
- Tanmay Nagar as Yash Sengupta: Shashwat and Ishani's son; Ankita's husband (2025)
- Sneha Bhawsar as Ankita Ghosh Sengupta: Yash's wife (2025)
- Shresth Kumar as Jeet: Ishani's enemy and rapist (2025)
- Riya Bhattacharjee as Radhika (2025)
- Unknown as Advocate Abhishek: An honest lawyer; Ishani's friend (2025)
- Sonali Pandit Naik as Anjali Sengupta: Prabhakar's daughter (2025)

== Production ==
=== Development ===
Screenwriter Leena Gangopadhyay who has previously written down the scripts for Jhanak and Iss Ishq... Ka Rabb Rakha developed the central plot for Ishani. Initially, Jhanak featured Megha Chakraborty as Ishani in a parallel storyline, post 5-year leap. Following the positive response to Ishani's storyline, it was developed into a series by the same name.

=== Casting ===
Megha Chakraborty was signed in to play Ishani. Aasiya Kazi was cast as Nandini and this series marks Kazi's return to television after a 2-year hiatus. Anupam Bhattacharya was sign to play Shashwat, marking his return to television after a 5-year hiatus. Tanmay Nagar joined the cast to play Yash.

=== Cancellation ===
The show went off air on 28 October 2025 due to low TRP response.

=== Broadcast ===
The storyline of Ishani, which used to be aired at late night slot after Jhanak, shifted to early evening slot as a standalone series.
