= Kashibai Bajirao Ballal =

Indian historical television series

- Genre: Historical drama
- Based on: Kashibai
- Written by: Shanti Bhushan
- Screenplay by: Yogesh Vikrant
- Story by: Prabhat Kumar; Gajra Kottari
- Directed by: Vikram Ghai
- Creative director: Uday Rakesh Berry
- Starring: Riya Sharma; Rohit Chandel
- Theme music composer: Nishant Raja
- Opening theme: Kashi.... by Anweshaa
- Country of origin: India
- Original languages: Hindi; Marathi
- No. of seasons: 1
- No. of episodes: 201

Production
- Producers: Smruti Shinde; Bobby Arora
- Editor: Dharmesh Patel
- Production company: Sobo Films

Original release
- Network: Zee TV
- Release: 15 November 2021 – 19 August 2022

Kashibai Bajirao Ballal is an Indian historical drama based on Kashibai. It premiered on 15 November 2021 on Zee TV with Aarohi Patel as Young Kashi Bai and Venkatesh Pandey as Young Bajirao. On 21 March 2022, the story moved on several years and Riya Sharma portrays the lead role of Kashibai opposite Rohit Chandel who essays the role of Bajirao. It went off air on 19 August 2022, after completing 201 episodes.

== Cast ==
=== Main ===
- Riya Sharma as Kashibai: Peshwinbai, Shiubai and Mahadji's daughter, Bajirao's first wife (2022)
  - Aarohi Patel as Child Kashi Joshi / Child Kashi Bajirao Ballal (2021–2022)
- Rohit Chandel as Baji Rao I Bhatt: Peshwa of Maratha Empire, Balaji Vishwanath and Radhabai Barve's son, Chimaji Appa, Anubai and Bhiubai's brother, Kashibai and Mastani's husband (2022)
  - Venkatesh Pandey as Young Bajirao Bhatt (2021–2022)

=== Recurring ===
- Farnaz Shetty as Mastani: Maharaj Chhatrasal and Ruhani Begum's daughter, Bajirao's second wife (2022)
- Vidisha Srivastav as Shiu Krishna Joshi
- Tarun Khanna as Balaji Vishwanath Bhatt (2021-2022)
- Aishwarya Narkar as Radha Balaji Bhatt
- Khalid Siddiqui as Chhatrapati Shahu I Bhosle
- Nabeel Mirajkar as Chimaji Appa Bhatt
- Smita Jaykar as Maharani Tarabai Rajaram Bhonsle
- Prashant Singh Rajput as Krishnarao Joshi
- Amit Pandey as Dacoit Mangal Singh
- Hetal Yadav as Bhavani Krishna Joshi
- Amol Bawdekar as Mahadji Krishna Joshi
- Vishal Chaudhary as Balarao Joshi (2021-2022)
- Palak Rana as Ganga
- Urmi as Annubai
- Twinkle Saini as Bhiu Joshi
- Tejaswi Parab as Kaveri
- Chhaya Katare as Jaishree
- Ankur Chaturvedi as Koshadaksh
- Chitra Sharma as Mandhara
- Jyoti Katariya as Mala
- Suneel Pushkarna as Maharaj Chhatrasal Bundela
- Rudrakshi Gupta as Ruhani Begum
- Naveen Sharma as Surya
- Ishaan Raj as Matang, Mastani's best friend
- Krishnakant Singh Bundela as Mahapandit

== Awards and nominations ==
Year	Award	Category	Recipient	Result	Ref.
2022	Indian Television Academy Awards	Popular Actress (Drama)	Riya Sharma	Nominated	
2022	Indian Television Academy Awards	Popular Actor (Drama)	Rohit Chandel	Nominated	
2022	Indian Television Academy Awards	Best Director – Drama	Vikram Ghai	Won	
2022	Indian Television Academy Awards	Best Historical Show	Kashibai Bajirao Ballal	Won	
