= Riya Sharma =

Indian television actress

- Born: 9 October 1998 (age 28); Nagpur, Maharashtra, India
- Occupation: Actress
- Years active: 2018–present
- Known for: Pinjara Khubsurti Ka, Kashibai Bajirao Ballal, Dhruv Tara – Samay Sadi Se Pare

Riya Sharma is an Indian actress who mainly works in Hindi television. She made her acting debut in 2018 with Saat Phero Ki Hera Pherie portraying Chinki Tandon. She is best known for her portrayal of Dr. Mayura Dubey Shukla in Pinjara Khubsurti Ka, Kashibai in Kashibai Bajirao Ballal and Rajkumari Tarapriya in Dhruv Tara – Samay Sadi Se Pare.

== Early life ==
Sharma was born and brought up in Nagpur. Her mother's name is Pratima Sharma. She couldn't complete her graduation as she had skipped her college's third years final exam to pursue acting.

== Career ==
Sharma made her acting debut in 2018 with Saat Phero Ki Hera Pherie portraying Chinki Tandon.

In 2020, she portrayed Sunaina in Maharaj Ki Jai Ho! opposite Satyajeet Dubey. It ended in two months due to COVID-19 pandemic.

From 2020 to 2021, she portrayed Dr. Mayura Dubey Shukla in Pinjara Khubsurti Ka opposite Sahil Uppal. She portrayed Mayura Goswami Vashisht in 2021, after the reincarnation track. It proved as a major turning point in her career.

Sharma started portraying Kashibai opposite Rohit Chandel in Kashibai Bajirao Ballal from March 2022. The show ended in August 2022. In October 2022, she was seen portraying Dr. Tulika in Banni Chow Home Delivery opposite Pravisht Mishra.

Sharma was last seen portraying Rajkumari Tarapriya Singh in Dhruv Tara – Samay Sadi Se Pare opposite Ishhan Dhawan from 2023 to 2024. Since June 2025, she played Jhanak in StarPlus's Jhanak opposite Arjit Taneja.

Sharma made her film debut with Disha Jha's Konman opposite Adhyayan Suman.

== Filmography ==
=== Films ===
Key
†	Denotes films that have not yet been released

Year	Title	Role	Notes	Ref.
2023	Baipan Bhari Deva	Madhavi		
TBA	Konman †	TBA	Filming	

=== Television ===
Year	Title	Role	Notes	Ref
2018	Saat Phero Ki Hera Pherie	Chinki Tandon		
2020	Maharaj Ki Jai Ho!	Sunaina	Lead role	
2020–2021	Pinjara Khubsurti Ka	Dr. Mayura Dubey Shukla	Lead role	
2021	Pinjara Khubsurti Ka	Mayura Goswami Vashisht	Lead role	
2022	Kashibai Bajirao Ballal	Kashibai	Lead role	
2022	Banni Chow Home Delivery	Dr. Tulika		
2023–2024	Dhruv Tara – Samay Sadi Se Pare	Rajkumari Tarapriya Singh	Lead role	
2024	Dhruv Tara – Samay Sadi Se Pare	Tara Shastri Seth	Lead role	
2025–2026	Jhanak	Jhanak Bose Chatterjee	Lead role	

== See also ==
- List of Hindi television actresses
- List of Indian television actresses
