= Richa Rathore =

Indian television actress (born 1993)

- Born: Richa Rathore; 29 January 1993 (age 33); Shimla, Himachal Pradesh
- Occupation: Actress
- Years active: 2015–present

Richa Rathore (born 29 January 1993) is an Indian actress who primarily works in Hindi television. Rathore is best known for her portrayal of Nandini Rawal in Aapki Nazron Ne Samjha and Ghazal Rahmani in Rabb Se Hai Dua.

== Filmography ==
=== Films ===
Year	Title	Role	Note	Ref.
2015	Tamasha			
2019	Catch the Light	Sameera	Short film	

=== Television ===
Year	Title	Role	Notes	Ref.
2018	Kumkum Bhagya	Neha Mehra	Supporting role	
2019	Divya Drishti	Patali	Cameo	
2019–2020	Naagin 4	Priyal Singh	Supporting role	
2020	RadhaKrishn	Rukmavati	Supporting role	
2021	Aapki Nazron Ne Samjha	Nandini "ATM" Rawal	Lead Role	
2022–2024	Rabb Se Hai Dua	Ghazal Rahmani	Negative role	
2025	Aye Dil Jee Le Zara	Anandi		
2025	Jhanak	Pihu Sengupta	Supporting role	
2025	Ishani	Pihu Sengupta	Guest	

== See also ==
- List of Hindi television actresses
- List of Indian television actresses
