= Sukh By Chance =

Indian television series

- Genre: Drama
- Directed by: Aatish Kapadia
- Starring: See below
- Country of origin: India
- Original language: Hindi

Production
- Producers: J.D. Majethia; Aatish Kapadia
- Running time: 25 minutes
- Production company: Hats Off Productions

Original release
- Network: Sony Entertainment Television
- Release: 10 November 2009 – 13 May 2010

Sukh By Chance (transl. Happiness by chance) is an Indian television series that airs on Sony TV, based on the story of a middle-class Gujarati family, the Mehtas, with modest financial earnings. The series premiered on 10 November 2009. It ended on 13 May 2010.

== Plot ==
The story revolves around a poor middle-class family, who struggle to survive. All of a sudden, lady luck smiles on them, and they become rich. All the scarcities in their lives are now taken over by big bank balances, and various luxuries. With money coming in, their lifestyle changes, as do their mentalities. However, they are satisfied with their material assets and more involved in deriving happiness from the little joys of life found in sharing life within a big, happy household. They not only continue to reside under one roof amicably, but have a common joint bank account operated by the patriarch of the family.

== Cast ==
- Sanjeev Jogtiyani as Mohan Mehta
- Bharati Patil as Sarala Mehta
- Ujjwal Chopra as Rajesh Mehta
- Upasana Shukla as Rajani Mehta
- Shyam Pathak aa Dheeraj Mehta
- Shreya More as Kokila Mehta
- Ketkie Jain as Tina Mehta: Dheeraj and Kokila's daughter
- Neel Patel as Mantu Mehta: Dheeraj and Kokila's son
- Anuj Thakur as Amit
- Krishna Bharadwaj as Akash
- Vibha Anand as Namrata
- Harsh Chhaya as Ashwin Mehta / Chandan Mehta
- Silambarasan
