= Raghukul Reet Sada Chali Aayi =

- Starring: Rajesh Khanna; Dinesh Kaushik; Jaya Bhattacharya; Shresth Kumar
- Original language: Hindi

Original release
- Network: DD National
- Release: 22 November 2008 – 2009

Raghukul Reet Sada Chali Aayi (transl. The Tradition of the Raghukul continues) is an Indian television series based on old Indian traditions (especially from the Raghukul period), cultures, and values, which revolves around the personal relationships among people in contemporary India. It premiered on 22 November 2008, and has starred Rajesh Khanna, Dinesh Kaushik, Jaya Bhattacharya and Shresth Kumar.

== Cast ==
- Rajesh Khanna
- Dinesh Kaushik
- Jaya Bhattacharya
- Shresth Kumar
- Sonal Udeshi
- Swati Anand
- Raushni Srivastava
