= Aasiya Kazi =

Indian television actress (born 1991)

- Born: 12 December 1991 (age 34); Mumbai, India
- Occupation: Actress
- Years active: 2009–present
- Spouse: Gulshan Nain (m. 2024)

Aasiya Kazi (born 12 December 1991) is an Indian television actress best known for her role of Santu Dharamraj Mahiyavanshi in Imagine TV's drama Bandini.

== Career ==
Kazi is best known for her role of Santu Dharamraj Mahiyavanshi in the television soap opera Bandini (2009-2011) on Imagine TV. She also played the role of Saudamini in Colors TV and Hema Malini’s Matti Ki Banno (2010), Kastur Galla in Imagine TV's Dharampatni (2011), Shweta Kapoor / Shweta Rishi Kumar in Zee TV's Hitler Didi, Ruku in Na Bole Tum Na Maine Kuch Kaha 2 on Colors TV, as Ganga in Balika Vadhu, and Sharda in Tenali Rama.

== Personal life ==
Kazi belongs to an Indian Muslim family. Actor Karan Khandelwal is her rakhi-brother.

Following a courtship of eight years, she married actor Gulshan Nain on 29 November 2024 in a private ceremony.

== Television ==
Year	Title	Role
2009–2011	Bandini	Santu Dharamraj Mahiyavanshi/Santu Baghela
2011	Matti Ki Banno	Saudamini
2011–2012	Dharampatni	Kastur Mohan Galla
2012–2013	Hitler Didi	Dr. Shweta Kapoor
2013	Na Bole Tum Na Maine Kuch Kaha 2	Ruku Vaidya
2013	Yeh Hai Aashiqui	Juhi
2014–2016	Balika Vadhu	Dr. Ganga Jagdish Singh
2016	Box Cricket League	Contestant (Team Ahmedabad Express)
2019–2020	Tenali Rama	Sharda
2022–2023	Janam Janam Ka Saath	Siya Vansh Raghuvanshi
2025	Ishani	Nandini Mitra Sengupta
