= Gold Award for Best Actress in a Supporting Role =

Indian media award

Gold Award for Best Actor in a Supporting Role - Female
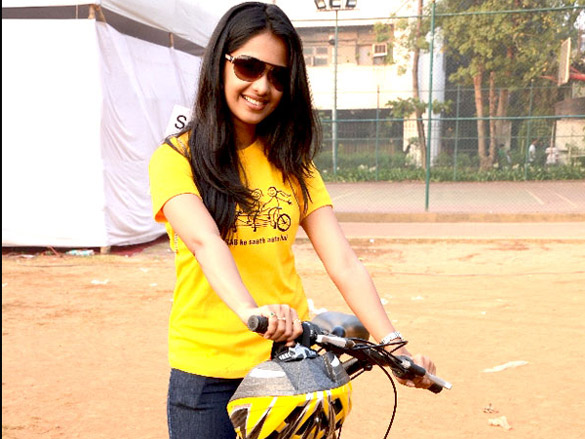
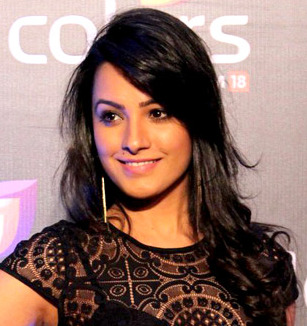
- The 2019 recipient: Mugdha Chaphekar(Popular); Anita Hassanandani(Jury)
- Awarded for: Best Performance by a Female Actor in a Supporting Role on Television
- Country: India
- Presented by: White Leaf Entertainment
- First award: 2007 (for performances in TV shows in 2006)
- Currently held by: Mugdha Chaphekar for Kumkum Bhagya (Popular); Anita Hassanandani for Naagin (season 3) (Jury)
- Website: Gold Awards

Gold Award for Best Actress in a Supporting Role is an award given by Zee TV as part of its annual Gold Awards for Indian television series and artists, to recognize a female actor who has delivered an outstanding performance in a supporting role.

The award was first awarded in 2007 and since has been separated in two categories, Critics Award and Popular Award. Critics Award is given by the chosen jury of critics assigned to the function while Popular Award is given on the basis of public votings.

== List of winners ==
=== 2000s ===
- 2007 Vaishali Thakkar - Baa Bahoo Aur Baby as Praveena Thakkar
  - Gauri Pradhan Tejwani - Kyunki Saas Bhi Kabhi Bahu Thi as Nandini Virani
  - Neena Gupta - Saat Phere...Saloni Ka Safar as Manno Bhabhi
  - Roshni Chopra - Kasamh Se as Pia Walia
  - Tina Parekh - Kahaani Ghar Ghar Kii as Shruti Aggrawal
- 2008 Aruna Irani - Naaginn - Wadoo Ki Agni Pariksha as Maa saa / Triveni
  - Aishwarya Narkar - Ghar Ki Lakshmi Betiyaan as Savitri Goradia
  - Smita Bansal - Balika Vadhu as Sumitra Singh
  - Vibha Chibber - Sapna Babul Ka...Bidaai as Kaushalya Prakashchandra Sharma
  - Prachi Shah - Kayamath as Premlata Under Shah
- 2009 Not Held

=== 2010s ===
- 2010 Smita Bansal - Balika Vadhu as Sumitra Singh
  - Savita Prabhune - Pavitra Rishta as Sulochana Karanjkar
  - Lata Sabharwal - Yeh Rishta Kya Kehlata Hai as Rajeshwari Maheshwari
  - Sukirti Kandpal - Agle Janam Mohe Bitiya Hi Kijo as Siddheshwari Singh
  - Vaishali Thakkar - Uttaran as Damini
- 2011 Smita Bansal - Balika Vadhu as Sumitra Singh
  - Savita Prabhune - Pavitra Rishta as Sulochana Karanjkar
  - Medha Jambotakar - Yeh Rishta Kya Kehlata Hai as Kaveri Singhania
  - Supriya Shukla - Tere Liye as Laboni Bannerjee
  - Vaishali Thakkar - Uttaran as Damini
- 2012 Rupal Patel - Saath Nibhaana Saathiya as Kokila Modi
  - Tarana Raja - Bade Achhe Lagte Hain as Neha Vikram Shergill
  - Neelu Vaghela - Diya Aur Baati Hum as Bhabho
  - Savita Prabhune - Pavitra Rishta as Sulochana Karanjkar
  - Rupali Ganguly - Parvarrish – Kuchh Khattee Kuchh Meethi as Pinky Ahuja
- 2013 Neelu Vaghela - Diya Aur Baati Hum as Bhabho
  - Asha Negi - Pavitra Rishta as Purvi Manav Deshmukh
  - Tarana Raja - Bade Achhe Lagte Hain as Neha Vikram Shergill
  - Smita Bansal - Balika Vadhu as Sumitra Singh
  - Manasi Salvi - Pyaar Ka Dard Hai Meetha Meetha Pyaara Pyaara as Avantika Deewan
  - Rupal Patel - Saath Nibhana Saathiya as Kokila Modi
- 2014 Neelu Vaghela - Diya Aur Baati Hum as Bhabho
  - Lavina Tandon - Jodha Akbar as Ruqaiyya Begum
  - Rupal Patel - Saath Nibhana Saathiya as Kokila Modi
  - Jayati Bhatia - Sasural Simar Ka as Mataji
  - Mihika Verma - Ye Hai Mohabbatein as Mihika Bhalla
  - Manasi Salvi - Pyaar Ka Dard Hai Meetha Meetha Pyaara Pyaara as Avantika Deewan
- 2015 Neelu Vaghela - Diya Aur Baati Hum as Bhabho
  - Rupal Patel - Saath Nibhana Saathiya as Kokila Modi
  - Jayati Bhatia - Sasural Simar Ka as Mataji
  - Mihika Verma - Ye Hai Mohabbatein as Mihika Bhalla
  - Mrunal Thakur - Kumkum Bhagya as Bulbul Arora
  - Rati Pandey - Begusarai as Komal Thakur
  - Supriya Shukla - Kumkum Bhagya as Sarla Arora
- 2016 Jayati Bhatia - Sasural Simar Ka as Mataji
  - Krutika Desai Khan - Mere Angne Mein as Shanti Srivastava
  - Mihika Verma - Ye Hai Mohabbatein as Mihika Bhalla
  - Mrunal Thakur - Kumkum Bhagya as Bulbul Arora
  - Barkha Sengupta - Sankat Mochan Mahabali Hanumaan as Anjana
- 2017 Parul Chauhan - Yeh Rishta Kya Kehlata Hai as Suvarna Goenka
  - Prachi Shah - Ek Shringaar-Swabhiman as Sharda Solanki
  - Juhi Parmar - Karmaphal Daata Shani as Sandhya
  - Avantika Hundal - Ye Hai Mohabbatein as Mihika Bhalla
  - Jyoti Gauba - Piyaa Albela as Supriya Vyas
- 2018 Anjum Fakih - Kundali Bhagya as Shristi Arora
  - Ruchi Savarn - Kumkum Bhagya as Disha Singh
  - Parul Chauhan - Yeh Rishta Kya Kehlata Hai as Suvarna Goenka
  - Sudha Chandran - Naagin (season 2) as Yamini Singh Raheja
  - Kamya Panjabi -Shakti - Astitva Ke Ehsaas Ki as Preeto Singh
- 2019 Mugdha Chaphekar - Kumkum Bhagya as Prachi Arora (tied with) Anita Hassanandani - Naagin (season 3) as Vishakha a.k.a. Vish
  - Anjum Fakih - Kundali Bhagya as Sristi Arora
  - Poorva Gokhale - Tujhse Hai Raabta as Anupriya Rane
  - Rupal Patel - Yeh Rishtey Hain Pyaar Ke as Meenakshi Rajvansh
  - Pooja Banerjee - Kasautii Zindagii Kay (2018 TV series) as Nivedita Basu
