= Indian Telly Award for Best Actress in a Supporting Role =

Award given by indiantelevision.com for best supporting female actress

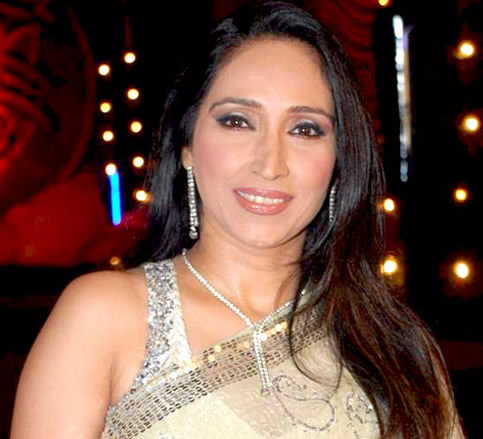
- The 2025 recipient: Ketki Dave
- Awarded for: Best Performance by an Actress in a Supporting Role on Television
- Country: India
- Presented by: IndianTelevision.com
- First award: 2004
- Currently held by: 2025 Ketki Dave – Pushpa Impossible as Kunjbala Parikh
- Website: Indian Telly Awards

Indian Telly Award for Best Actor in a Supporting Role – Female is an award given by Indiantelevision.com as part of its annual Indian Telly Awards for TV serials, to recognize a female actor who has delivered an outstanding performance in a Supporting Role.

The award was first awarded in 2004. Since 2010, the award has been separated in two categories, Jury Award and Popular Award. Winner of Jury award is chosen by the jury of critics assigned to the function while Popular Award is given on the basis of public voting.

== List of winners (Popular) ==
=== 2000–2009 ===
- 2001 Not Awarded
- 2002 Not Awarded
- 2003 Not Awarded
- 2004 Geetanjali Tikekar – Kasautii Zindagii Kay as Aparna Basu
  - Aruna Irani – Des Mein Niklla Hoga Chand as Teji
  - Sudha Shivpuri – Kyunki Saas Bhi Kabhi Bahu Thi as Baa
  - Tina Parekh – Kahaani Ghar Ghar Kii as Shruti
  - Poonam Narula – Kkusum as Mahi
- 2005 Gauri Pradhan Tejwani – Kyunki Saas Bhi Kabhi Bahu Thi as Nandini
  - Tina Parekh – Kahaani Ghar Ghar Kii as Shruti
  - Suvarna Jha – Kaisa Ye Pyar Hai as Mishti
  - Shweta Gulati – Remix as Tia
  - Mauli Ganguly – Sarrkkar..Risshton Ki Ankahi Kahani as Kritika
- 2006 Tina Parekh – Kasautii Zindagii Kay as Mukti
  - Surveen Chawla – Kahiin To Hoga as Charu
  - Aruna Irani – Vaidehi – Ek Aur Agni Pareeksha as Sitadevi
  - Vaishnavi Mahant – Ek Ladki Anjaani Si as Meera Sachdeva
  - Neena Gupta – Saat Phere as Manno Bhabhi
- 2007 Lubna Salim – Baa Bahoo Aur Baby as Leela Thakkar
  - Jaya Bhattacharya – Thodi Si Zameen Thoda Sa Aasmaan as Pooja
  - Ashlesha Sawant – Saat Phere as Tara
  - Achint Kaur – Virrudh as Vedika
  - Rakshanda Khan – Kyunki Saas Bhi Kabhi Bahu Thi as Tanya Virani
  - Jennifer Winget – Kasautii Zindagii Kay as Sneha
  - Arunima Sharma – Kasamh Se as Rano
- 2008 Smita Bansal – Balika Vadhu as Sumitra
  - Amrapali Gupta – Teen Bahuraaniyaan as Bindiya
  - Arunima Sharma – Kasamh Se as Rani
  - Aditi Sajwan – Jai Shri Krishna as Yashoda
  - Vibha Chibber – Sapna Babul Ka...Bidaai as Kaushalya Devi
- 2009 Savita Prabhune – Pavitra Rishta as Sulochana
  - Vibha Anand – Balika Vadhu as Sugna Shyam Singh.
  - Smita Bansal – Balika Vadhu as Sumitra
  - Lata Sabharwal – Yeh Rishta Kya Kehlata Hai as Rajshree Maheshwari
  - Roopa Ganguly – Agle Janam Mohe Bitiya Hi Kijo as Sumitra

=== 2010–2019 ===
- 2010 Supriya Pilgaonkar – Sasural Genda Phool as Shailja Kashyap
  - Bhairavi Raichura – Balika Vadhu as Bhagwati
  - Lata Sabharwal – Yeh Rishta Kya Kehlata Hai as Rajshree Maheshwari
  - Roopa Ganguly – Agle Janam Mohe Bitiya Hi Kijo as Sumitra
  - Vaishali Thakkar – Uttaran as Damini
- 2011 No Award
- 2012 Rupal Patel – Saath Nibhana Saathiya as Kokila Parag Modi
  - Anjum Farooki – Balika Vadhu as Gauri Jagdish Singh
  - Neelu Vaghela – Diya Aur Baati Hum as Santosh Arun Rathi (Bhabo)
  - Supriya Pilgaonkar – Sasural Genda Phool as Shailja Kashyap
  - Aarti Singh – Parichay – Nayee Zindagi Kay Sapno Ka as Seema Chopra
- 2013 Pallavi Purohit – Madhubala - Ek Ishq Ek Junoon as Padmini
  - Neelu Vaghela – Diya Aur Baati Hum as Santosh Arun Rathi (Bhabo)
  - Smita Bansal – Balika Vadhu as Sumitra
  - Sonali Sachdev – Sanskaar – Dharohar Apno Ki as Parul Karsan Vaishav
  - Rupal Patel – Saath Nibhana Saathiya as Kokila Parag Modi
- 2014 Rajshree Thakur – Bharat Ka Veer Putra – Maharana Pratap as Maharani Jaivantabai
  - Neelu Vaghela – Diya Aur Baati Hum as Santosh Arun Rathi (Bhabo)
  - Vaishali Thakkar – Uttaran as Damini
  - Shafaq Naaz – Mahabharat as Kunti
  - Mihika Verma – Yeh Hai Mohabbatein as Mihika Iyer
- 2019 – Anita Hassanandani – Naagin 3 as Vishakha

=== 2020 – present ===
- 2023 Supriya Pilgaonkar – Kuch Rang Pyar Ke Aise Bhi as Ishwari Dixit & Alpana Buch – Anupamaa as Leela Shah
- 2025 Ketki Dave – Pushpa Impossible as Kunjbala Parikh

== Jury Award ==
=== 2010 ===
- 2010 Vaishali Thakkar – Uttaran as Damini
- 2011 No Award
- 2012 Surekha Sikri – Balika Vadhu as Kalyani Devi (Dadisa)
  - Bhairavi Raichura – Balika Vadhu as Bhagwati
  - Smita Bansal – Balika Vadhu as Sumitra
  - Kamya Panjabi – Maryada: Lekin Kab Tak? as Uttara
  - Supriya Pilgaonkar – Sasural Genda Phool as Shailja Kashyap
- 2013 Neelu Vaghela – Diya Aur Baati Hum as Santosh Arun Rathi (Bhabo)
  - Alka Amin – Parichay – Nayee Zindagi Kay Sapno Ka as Veena Chopra
  - Zarina Wahab – Gumrah: End of Innocence as Sawant Daggar
  - Jayati Bhatia – Sasural Simar Ka as Nirmala Devi Bhardwaj
  - Tarana Raja Kapoor – Bade Achhe Lagte Hain as Neha Vikram Shergill
- 2014 Shabana Azmi – 24 (Indian TV series) as Abhilasha Grewal
  - Vaishali Thakkar – Uttaran as Damini
  - Rajshree Thakur – Bharat Ka Veer Putra – Maharana Pratap as Maharani Jaivantabai
  - Vaishnavi Mahant – Sapne Suhane Ladakpan Ke as Shail Dayal Garg
  - Shama Deshpande – Madhubala - Ek Ishq Ek Junoon as Radha Kundra
- 2019 Poorva Gokhale – Tujhse Hai Raabta as Anupriya Deshmukh and Mohena Singh – Yeh Rishta Kya Kehlata Hai as Keerti Singhania

=== 2023 ===
- 2023 Anjum Fakih – Kundali Bhagya as Sristhi Arora

== Indian Telly Award for Best Actress in a Supporting Role (Comedy) ==
=== Popular ===
- 2014 Sapna Sikarwar – F.I.R
  - Kanika Maheshwari – Diya Aur Baati Hum as Meenakshi Vikram Rathi
  - Debina Bonnerjee – Chidiya Ghar as Mayuri
  - Sumona Chakravarti – Comedy Nights with Kapil as Manju
  - Upasana Singh – Comedy Nights with Kapil as Pinky Bua
- 2015 Manasi Parekh – Sumit Sambhal Lega as Maya Walia
  - Sumona Chakravathy – Comedy Nights with Kapil as Manju
  - Anita Kanwal – Zindagi Abhi Baaki Hai Mere Ghost as Dadi
  - Bharti Singh – Comedy Nights Bachao
  - Upasana Singh – Comedy Nights with Kapil as Bua
