= Katial =

Katial is a surname. Notable people with the surname include:

- Chuni Lal Katial (1898–1978), British politician
- Tarun Katial (born 1975), Indian broadcast executive
