= Kavita Kaushik =

Indian actress

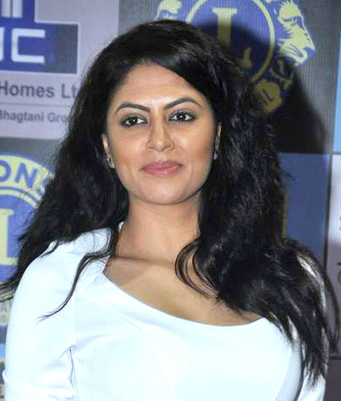
- Kaushik in 2014
- Born: 15 February 1981 (age 45); New Delhi, India
- Occupations: Actress; television host; model
- Years active: 2001–present
- Known for: F.I.R.; Bigg Boss 14
- Spouse: Ronnit Biswas (m. 2017)

Kavita Kaushik (born 15 February 1981) is an Indian actress who primarily works in Hindi and Punjabi television. Kaushik is well known for her portrayal of Chandramukhi Chautala in SAB TV's sitcom F.I.R., a role which established her career in the television industry and made her a household name.

She made her debut with Ekta Kapoor's Kutumb. She participated in reality shows Nach Baliye (2007), Jhalak Dikhhla Jaa (2015) and Bigg Boss (2020).

== Early life ==
Kaushik was born on 15 February 1981 to a Brahmin family in New Delhi, India. She is the daughter of Dinesh Chandra Kaushik, a former CRPF officer. She graduated in philosophy from Indraprastha College for Women, Delhi.

== Career ==
=== 2001–2006: Debut ===
Kaushik had started modelling, hosting events and anchoring during her college days. In 2001 she went for auditions in New Delhi for Kutumb and moved to Mumbai. Kaushik joined Ekta Kapoor's Kahaani Ghar Ghar Kii, portraying the role of Manya Doshi. In 2002, she appeared in two shows Kohi Apna Sa and Kammal.

In 2003, Kavita acted in Sony TV's Kahani Terrii Merrii and Zee TV's Piya Ka Ghar In 2004, she appeared in shows Dil Kya Chahtha Hai, Raat Hone Ko Hai in an episodic appearance, Ruby Duby Hub Dub and Tumhari Disha. From 2004 to 2005, she portrayed Naina Kulkarni, in Star Plus's longest running daily soap Kumkum – Ek Pyara Sa Bandhan This followed by appearing in another daily soap Remix as Pallavi. Kaushik made brief appearances in Ye Meri Life Hai and C.I.D. as Sub Inspector Anushka.

Kaushik made a debut in Bollywood with the 2004 film, Ek Hasina Thi playing Saif Ali Khan's girlfriend. In 2005, Kaushik returned to television with the show, Rooh, followed by playing Deepika in Saarrthi

=== 2006–2015: Breakthrough and success ===
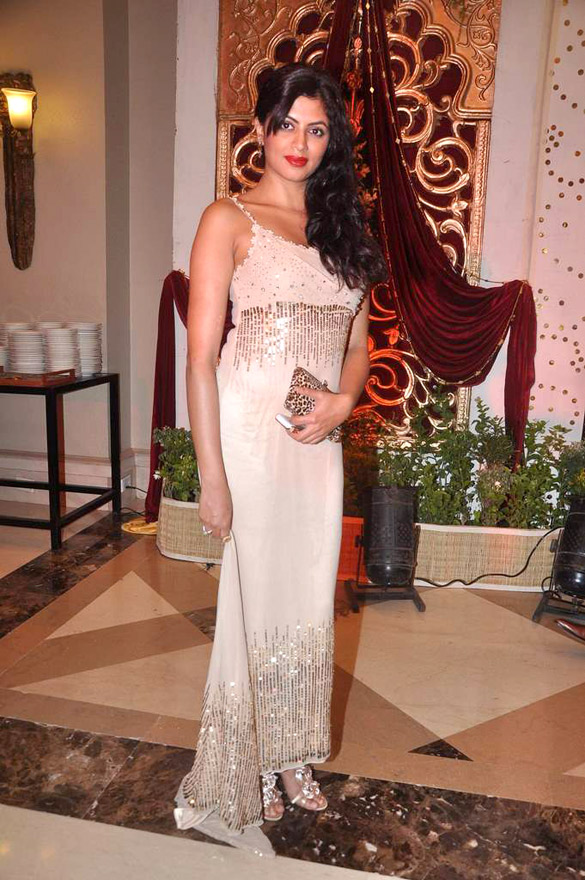
Kaushik at a wedding

In 2006, Kaushik's breakthrough finally came when she was roped in to playing the main lead in SAB TV's longest running sitcom, F.I.R. as Chandramukhi Chautala. She portrayed the role until the end. In her initial days in the industry, Kaushik was offered mostly glamorous and negative roles owing to her tall frame and appealing personality. Her stint as Chandramukhi Chautala in F.I.R. proved to be a watershed role in her career and it marked a break from the negative roles that she was being offered at that time. The sitcom proved to be a success, completing 1000 episodes. The role of a gusty female cop who speaks in a Haryanavi accent made Kaushik a renowned face of Indian television and won several accolades for her. During her time off FIR, the show took a 20-year leap with actor Chitrashi Rawat playing the role of Jawalamukhi Chautala, Chandramukhi's daughter. Kaushik made a comeback in FIR donning her previous role of Chandramukhi Chautala in July 2013 while Rawat was asked to quit the show. The show ended in January 2015.

In 2009, Kaushik presented Star Plus's reality show Arre Deewano Mujhe Pehchano. Despite the sitcom's success, Kaushik left the show in January 2013 to star in another SAB TV sitcom Tota Weds Maina opposite Gaurav Gera. The story focused on Tota (Gera) and Maina (Kaushik), and the situations that ensued when they mistakenly marry one another. However, the show continually saw a dip in the TRPs and went off air in the April of the same year.

In addition to her various television roles, Kaushik has played minor roles in films like Mumbai Cutting (2009) and Phillum City (2011). She has even performed to an item song, Shakila Bano, in Apoorva Lakhia's Zanjeer (2013).

=== 2015–present: Jhalak Dikhhla Jaa and later projects ===
In 2014, Kaushik presented Sony TV's sports reality show, Box Cricket League along with VJ Andy. In July 2015, Kaushik participated Colors TV's celebrity dance show, Jhalak Dikhhla Jaa 8, however she was eliminated in 2nd week. Kaushik stormed out of the Jhalak stage during its grand finale in October 2015 after the Comedy Nights Bachao team insulted her and turned her mike off. Kaushik said:

"Yes it's true, I am totally against shows like the roast where national personalities are insulted with cheap comments, people do it but I don't have any such majboori nor am I comfortable projecting myself in a shallow manner to create content or money. I had signed Jhalak and not "Bachaao", without my permission or a brief some random people threw a volley of insults at me and when I tried to retaliate they cut power off my Mike."

In October, Kaushik hosted a show Fakebook with Kavita. In June 2016, Kaushik landed the lead role of Bhanumati in SAB TV's Dr. Bhanumati On Duty. Within a month, she quit the show and got replaced by Debina Bonnerjee. However, after the exit of Kaushik the show failed to do well and ended in September 2016.

Kaushik starred in a Bollywood film titled Lollipop Since 1947. The film, which was directed by Anirudh Chautala, is a political satire set in a lower middle-class household where Kaushik plays wife to actor Deepak Dobriyal. In 2017, Kaushik made a celebrity guest appearance for Sakshi Tanwar's cooking reality show, Tyohaar Ki Thaali as a contestant. Kaushik made a debut in the Punjabi film industry with Vekh Baraatan Challiyan (2017). She later appeared in two more Punjabi films, Vadhayiyaan Ji Vadhayiyaan and Nankana along with Anas Rashid.

From 2018 until 2019, Kaushik presented Star Bharat's crime show, Savdhaan India. In 2019, she starred in the Punjabi film, Mindo Taseeldarni as Mindo. In 2019, Kaushik participated in Colors TV's Kitchen Champion 5 along with Aamir Ali and presented by Arjun Bijlani.

In October 2020, Kaushik participated in the reality show Bigg Boss 14, entering as a wild card contestant. She first got evicted but later re-entered. She walked out of the house after a fight with Rubina Dilaik in November.

== Personal life ==
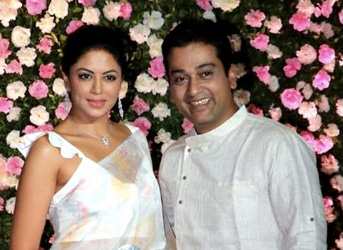
Kavita with her husband Ronit Biswas, 2018

Kaushik was in a relationship with fellow television actor Karan Grover and they participated in celebrity couples dance reality show Nach Baliye 3. The couple parted their ways in 2008. She married her best friend businessman Ronnit Biswas, in January 2017.

== Filmography ==
=== Films ===
Year	Title	Role	Language
2004	Ek Hasina Thi	Karan's girlfriend	Hindi
2008	Mumbai Cutting		Hindi
2010	Phillum City	Kalyani	Hindi
2013	Zanjeer		Hindi/Telugu
2017	Vekh Baraatan Challiyan	Sarla Dangi	Punjabi
2018	Vadhayiyaan Ji Vadhayiyaan	Gagan	Punjabi
2019	Mindo Taseeldarni	Mindo	Punjabi
2023	Carry on Jatta 3	Daljeet	Punjabi
2025	Loveyapa	Kavita Bhabhi	Hindi

Dubbing roles
Film title	Original Voice(s)	Character	Dub Language	Original Language	Original Year Release	Dub Year Release	Notes
Bolt	Susie Essman	Mittens (Milli)	Hindi	English	2008	2008	

=== Television ===
Year	Title	Role	Ref
2001–2003	Kutumb	Sakshi Malhotra	
2003	Kahaani Ghar Ghar Kii	Manya Doshi	
2002	Kohi Apna Sa	Rachana Gill	
2002	Kammal	Rushal	
2003	Kahani Terrii Merrii	Kavita	
2003	Piya Ka Ghar	Rashi	
2004	Dil Kya Chahtha Hai	Nari Merchant	
2004	Raat Hone Ko Hai	Kavita	
2004	Ruby Duby Hub Dub	Sneha	
2004	Tumhari Disha	Porineeta	
2004–2005	Ye Meri Life Hai	Annie	
2004–2005	Kumkum – Ek Pyara Sa Bandhan	Naina Kulkarni / Naina Rahul Wadhwa	
2004–2005	Arre Deewano Mujhe Pehchano	Host	
2004–2006	Remix	Pallavi	
2005–2006	C.I.D.	Inspector Anushka	
2005	Rooh		
2005	Saarrthi	Deepika	
2006	Kyaa Hoga Nimmo Kaa	Natasha	
2006–2015	F.I.R.	Inspector Chandramukhi Chautala	
2007	Ghar Ek Sapna	Vanshika	
2007	Kesar	Kadambari Abhinav Pandey	
2008	Nach Baliye 3	Contestant	
2009	Nachle Ve with Saroj Khan	Contestant	
2010	Comedy Circus Ka Jadoo	Guest	
2013	Tota Weds Maina	Maina	
2014–2015	Box Cricket League 1	Host	
2015	Comedy Nights with Kapil	Guest	
2015	Jhalak Dikhhla Jaa 8	Contestant	
2015–2016	Fakebook with Kavita	Host	
2016	Dr. Bhanumati On Duty	Dr. Bhanumati	
2017	Tyohaar Ki Thaali	Guest	
2018–2019	Savdhaan India	Host	
2019	Kitchen Champion	Guest	
2020	Bigg Boss 14	Contestant	15th place
2021	Lakshmi Ghar Aayi	Baksa Mausi	
2022	Goodnight India	Guest	
2022	Maddam Sir	IPS Chandramukhi Chautala (Guest)	

=== Web Series ===
Year	Title	Role	Notes	Ref.
2022	The Cobweb		Amazon MX Player	
2026	Kaptaan	Preet	Amazon MX Player	

== Awards ==
Year	Award	Category	Role	Show	Ref	Result
2010	Indian Telly Awards	Best Actress in a Comic Role: Jury	Chandramukhi Chautala	F.I.R.	—N/a	Won
2010	Indian Television Academy Awards	Best Actress: Comedy	Chandramukhi Chautala	F.I.R.	—N/a	Won
2011	Zee Gold Awards	Best Comic Actress: Jury	Chandramukhi Chautala	F.I.R.	—N/a	Won
2011	Indian Television Academy Awards	Best Actress: Comedy	Chandramukhi Chautala	F.I.R.		Won
2012	Indian Telly Awards	Most Popular Actress in a Comic Role	Chandramukhi Chautala	F.I.R.		Won
2012	Gold Awards	Best Comic Actress: Popular	Chandramukhi Chautala	F.I.R.	—N/a	Won
2013	Indian Television Academy Awards	Best Actress: Comedy	Chandramukhi Chautala	F.I.R.		Won
