= Indian Telly Award for Best Child Artiste – Male =

- Awarded for: Best performance by a male child actor in a comic role on television
- Country: India
- Presented by: IndianTelevision.com
- First award: 2004
- Website: Indian Telly Awards

Indian Telly Award for Best Child Artiste – Male is an award given by Indiantelevision.com as part of its annual Indian Telly Awards for TV serials, to recognize a male child actor who has delivered an outstanding performance on television.

The award was first awarded in 2003 under the title TV Child Artiste of the Year for a performance by either sex. Next year, it was officially divided into two separate categories to acknowledge both male and female actors individually.

== List of winners ==
=== Child Artiste of the Year ===
- 2001 Not Awarded
- 2002 Not Awarded
- 2003 Won by a female actor
- 2004 Zain Khan – Jassi Jaissi Koi Nahin as Rohan
  - Yash Mittal – Khichdi as Jackie
  - Kinshuk Vaidya – Shaka Laka Boom Boom as Sanju
  - Abbas Khandelwal – Shaka Laka Boom Boom as Klesha
  - Smith Seth – Bachha Party as Rishi Gujral
- 2005 Yash Mittal – Khichdi as Jackie
  - Darshil Mashru – Ruby Duby Hub Dub as Gochu
  - Rahul – Guns & Roses as Vincent
  - Zain – Jassi Jaissi Koi Nahin as Rohan
- 2006 Dhruv – Kaisa Ye Pyar Hai as Prateek
  - Rajat Tokas – Dharti Ka Veer Yodha Prithviraj Chauhan as Prithviraj Chauhan
  - Smith Seth – Baa Bahoo Aur Baby as Manav Thakkar
  - Abhileen Pandey – Jabb Love Hua as Chottu
- 2007 Rajat Tokas – Dharti Ka Veer Yodha Prithviraj Chauhan as Prithviraj Chauhan
  - Smith Seth – Baa Bahoo Aur Baby as Manav Thakkar
  - Adityansh – Hero - Bhakti Hi Shakti Hai as Bakyay Babu
  - Shyam Sharma – Banoo Main Teri Dulhann as
  - Dev Kantawala – Vicky & Vetaal as Vicky Sharma
- 2008 Krish Karnavat – Main Teri Parchhain Hoon as Sachin
  - Avinaash Mukherjee – Balika Vadhu as Jagadish
  - Dhriti Bhatia – Jai Shri Krishna as Krishna
  - Smith Seth – Baa Bahoo Aur Baby as Manav Thakkar
  - Varun Shukla – Kumkum – Ek Pyara Sa Bandhan as Sumit
- 2009 Avinash Mukherjee- Balika Vadhu as Jagya
  - Dhriti Bhatia – Jai Shri Krishna as Krishna
  - Siddharth Gupta – Maat Pitaah Ke Charnon Mein Swarg as Shubh
  - Adarsh – Mahavir Hanuman
  - Bhavya Gandhi – Taarak Mehta Ka Ooltah Chashmah as Tapu
- 2010 Bhavya Gandhi – Taarak Mehta Ka Ooltah Chashmah as Tapu
  - Avinaash Mukherjee – Balika Vadhu as Jagadish
  - Nikunj Padaya – Mrs. & Mr. Sharma Allahabadwale as Dabbu
  - Devarsh Amit Thaker – Tere Liye as Anurag
  - Tapasvi Mehta – Ishaan: Sapno Ko Awaaz De as Ishaan
- 2011 No Award
- 2012 Raj Mange – Jai Jai Jai Bajrang Bali as Hanuman
  - Paras Arora – Veer Shivaji as Shivaji
  - Bhavya Gandhi – Taarak Mehta Ka Ooltah Chashmah as Tapu
  - Aryan Sharma – Diya Aur Baati Hum as Chotu
  - Rushiraj Pawar – Chandragupt Maurya as Chandragupt Maurya
- 2013 Bhavesh Balchandani – Ek Veer Ki Ardaas...Veera as Veer
  - Sadhil Kapoor – Devon Ke Dev...Mahadev as Ganesh
  - Raj Mange – Jai Jai Jai Bajrang Bali as Hanuman
  - Dev Joshi – Baal Veer as Baal Veer
  - Divyam Dama – Punar Vivaah as Ansh Yash Sindhia
  - Shivansh Kotia – Yeh Rishta Kya Kehlata Hai as Naksh
- 2014 Faisal Khan – Bharat Ka Veer Putra – Maharana Pratap as Young Mharana Pratap
  - Bhavesh Balchandani – Ek Veer Ki Ardaas...Veera as Veer
  - Shivansh Kotia – Yeh Rishta Kya Kehlata Hai as Naksh
  - Vishesh Bansal – Buddhaa – Rajaon Ka Raja as Young Siddharth
  - Dev Joshi – Baal Veer as Veer
- 2015 Siddharth Nigam – Chakravartin Ashoka Samrat as Ashoka
  - Ishant Bhanushali – Sankatmochan Mahabali Hanuman as Bal Hanuman
  - Dev Joshi – Baal Veer as Veer
- 2019 Krish Parekh – Tenali Rama as Gundappa
- 2023 Tanmay Shah – Ghum Hai Kisikey Pyaar Meiin as Vinayak Chauhan

== See also ==
- Indian Telly Award for Best Child Artiste – Female
