= Ruhanika Dhawan =

Indian child television actress (born 2007)

Ruhaanika Dhawan
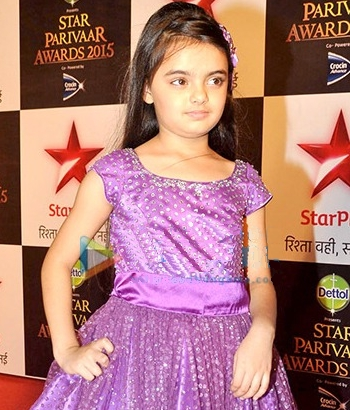
- Dhawan in 2015
- Born: 25 September 2007 (age 19); Mumbai, India
- Occupation: Actress
- Years active: 2010–present
- Known for: Yeh Hai Mohabbatein
- Notable work: Yeh Hai Mohabbatein; Khatron Ke Khiladi 15

Ruhaanika Dhawan is an Indian actress known for working in Hindi television. She started her career with the 2012 Zee TV's show Mrs. Kaushik Ki Paanch Bahuein as Aashi. She was then approached to play the roles of Child Ruhi Bhalla and Child Pihu Bhalla in Star Plus's series Yeh Hai Mohabbatein. For her performance she won several awards, including the Indian Telly Award for Most Popular Child Actress. She also gained recognition for her participation as a contestant on the stunt based reality show Khatron Ke Khiladi 15.

Later in January 2014, Dhawan played a cameo in the 2014 Bollywood film Jai Ho. In February 2015, she signed the 2016 Sunny Deol starrer action drama film Ghayal Once Again.

== Life and career ==
Ruhanika Dhawan was born on 25 September 2007 in Mumbai, India. She studies at IGCSE school. She lives in Mumbai. She can speak Hindi and English, and learned Punjabi from actor Sunny Deol in 2014.

Dhawan began her career with the 2012 soap opera Mrs. Kaushik Ki Paanch Bahuein, which she played the role of Aashi on Zee TV. Later she featured to play the pivotal role in Ekta Kapoor's romance-drama series Yeh Hai Mohabbatein. She is portraying alongside an ensemble cast including Divyanka Tripathi, Karan Patel and plays the role of Child Ruhi Bhalla on Star Plus channel. The story of the show is based on Manju Kapur's novel "Custody". It tells the story of Dr. Ishita (played by Tripathi), who is Tamilian whereas Raman (played by Patel), who is Punjabi. Ishita marries Raman and gets attached emotionally to Raman's daughter, Ruhi, who lives with her divorced father. For her performance in this series she won the 2014 Indian Telly Award for Most Popular Child Actress. The show recently took a 7-year leap. After this leap, Ruhanika is playing the character of Child Pihu Bhalla who is the step younger sister of Ruhi and the biological daughter of Raman and Ishita.

While working in Yeh Hai Mohabbatein, she approached to play in the 2014 Salman Khan starred action drama film Jai Ho, in which she appeared as a cameo.

She walked the ramp as a showstopper for a fashion show, at which she appeared in Barbie attire. The event was held at the end of August 2014. On 22 November 2014, she appeared as a guest in K9 productions comedy show Comedy Nights with Kapil on Colors TV.

In February 2015, Dhawan bagged to play in the 2016 action drama film Ghayal Once Again. The film is written and directed by actor Sunny Deol and produced by Dharmendra. It is the sequel of the 1990 film Ghayal and is based on the life of an encounter specialist officer of the Mumbai Police. The film was scheduled to release on 15 January 2016.

== Filmography ==
=== Films ===
| Year | Title | Role | Notes |
|---|---|---|---|
| 2014 | Jai Ho | Sanjana | Cameo appearance |
| 2016 | Ghayal: Once Again | Ananya Bansal | |

=== Television ===
| Year | Title | Role | Notes |
|---|---|---|---|
| 2012 | Mrs. Kaushik Ki Paanch Bahuein | Child Aashi | |
| 2013–2016 | Yeh Hai Mohabbatein | Child Ruhi Bhalla | |
| 2016–2019 | Yeh Hai Mohabbatein | Pihu Bhalla | |
| 2014 | Comedy Nights with Kapil | Herself | Special appearance |
| 2016 | Comedy Nights Bachao | Herself | Season 2; Episode 1 |
| 2016 | Tuyul & Mba Yul Reborn | Herself | Guest appearance |
| 2021 | Mere Sai - Shraddha Aur Saburi | Rama | |
| 2026 | Khatron Ke Khiladi 15 | Contestant | 8th place |

== Awards and nominations ==
| Year | Award | Category | Work | Result |
|---|---|---|---|---|
| 2014 | Indian Television Academy Awards | Most Promising Child Star (Desh Ka Ladla) | Ye Hai Mohabbatein | Nominated |
| 2014 | Indian Telly Awards | Most Popular Child Artiste - Female | Ye Hai Mohabbatein | Won |

== See also ==
List of Indian television actresses
