= Chunni Lal =

Chunni Lal is a famous character of Bengali romance novel Devdas written by Sarat Chandra Chattopadhyay.

Chunni Lal or Chuni Lal may also refer to:

- Chuni Lal Katial, a South Asian doctor and politician, who became the first UK's South Asian mayor, after being elected mayor of Finsbury in 1938.
- Naib Subedar Chuni Lal, Ashok Chakra, Vir Chakra, Sena Medal (Gallantry) was a soldier of 8th Battalion of Jammu and Kashmir Light Infantry (8 JAK LI) of Indian Army.
- Chuni Lal Bhagat, member of Bharatiya Janta Party, is an Indian politician and Minister for Local Government and Medical Education & Research in the present Punjab Government.
