= Kahiin to Hoga =

Indian television drama series (2003)

- Genre: Soap opera Romance
- Created by: Balaji Telefilms
- Based on: Pride and Prejudice by Jane Austen
- Developed by: Ekta Kapoor
- Written by: Mushtaq Shiekh; Anil Nagpal
- Directed by: Santram Varma; Anil V. Kumar; Santosh Bhatt; Shatrugan Goswami; Rishi Tyagi; Deepak Chavan
- Creative directors: Gargi Chandra; Shivangi Singh Chauhan; Nivedita Basu; Doris Dey; Shipra Arora; Set Design- Smita Gupta
- Starring: Aamna Sharif; Rajeev Khandelwal; Gurpreet Singh
- Opening theme: "Kahiin To Hoga" by Priya Bhattacharya
- Country of origin: India
- Original language: Hindi
- No. of seasons: 1
- No. of episodes: 799

Production
- Producers: Ekta Kapoor; Shobha Kapoor
- Cinematography: Ashok Salian; Santosh Suryavanshi
- Editors: Vikas Sharma; Lalit Tiwari; Sandeep Bhatt
- Running time: 24 minutes

Original release
- Network: StarPlus
- Release: 8 September 2003 – 16 February 2007

Kahiin To Hoga (transl. Will be Somewhere) is an Indian soap opera which aired on StarPlus from September 2003 to February 2007. The show was created by Ekta Kapoor of Balaji Telefilms and starred Aamna Sharif, Rajeev Khandelwal and Gurpreet Singh. The show is based on the 1813 novel Pride and Prejudice by Jane Austen.

== Plot summary ==
Kashish, Mahek, Mouli, Kanan and Charu are five sisters living in Shimla. Their father, Prof. Sinha, is an idealistic college teacher. One day, Kashish accidentally hits a car belonging to Sujal Garewal, a rich, young businessman. Later, she goes for a job interview to his office. She assumes that she will not get the job, but Sujal hires her. Sujal works for a business enterprise started by his father, Chetan Garewal, in partnership with close friend/brother-figure Lalit Raheja. The Raheja and Garewal families live in the same house. Sujal's best friend is Lalit's son, Piyush. Sujal has a spoilt and arrogant younger brother, Rishi, who flirts with both Mouli and Mahek. Piyush's younger brother, Varun, secretly loves Mahek.

Kashish and Sujal eventually fall in love with each other as they grow even closer since seeing each other daily at work. She writes a love letter to him and leaves it on his desk. Rishi, who dislikes Kashish, sees the letter and deliberately puts Piyush's name on it. When Piyush sees the letter, he thinks that Kashish likes him and begins to feel the same way for her. Lalit and Prof. Sinha decide to get Piyush and Kashish married. Meanwhile, Sujal and Kashish verbally profess their love for each other. Kashish assumes she is about to get engaged to Sujal. On the day of the engagement, Kashish is shocked to see Piyush as her fiancé. But she decides to stay quiet to prevent humiliation for her family. However, Sujal sees the letter with Piyush's name on it and thinks that Kashish is cheating on him. He cuts all ties with her and is heartbroken. Amidst all this, Mahek gets pregnant with Rishi’s child unbeknownst to everyone. The families plan their engagement but in a sudden turn of events, the Sinha family are embarrassed as the pregnancy truth come to light. Rishi despises a plan to break the engagement as he only used Mahek. Mahek is thrown out the house by Prof Sinha and he cuts all ties with her. Varun supports her.

Akshat Shergill, an old friend of the Sinha family, enters the scene. His entry is followed by the arrival of his mother Reva and elder brother, Swayam. Akshat starts working in the R&G company and becomes a good friend and ally of Sujal, whilst he's also a good friend to Kashish. He learns of Kashish and Sujal's past and of Sujal's unconditional love for Kashish and hopes to bring them together to give Kashish a new life. Akshat and Charu soon fall in love with each other. Mahek gives birth to a son. Varun soon confesses his love for her and proposes but she refuses as she doesn't want to be in a relationship again. But later accepts as she realises is willing to sacrifice everything for her and her son who she names Roshan. Sujal arranges their marriage much to Rishi's dismay. As Mahek begins to live in the Raheja/Garewal household, Rishi flirts with her and grows close to their son. He finds out that he has real feelings for Mahek whilst she despises him and he tries to separate Mahek and Varun but is thwarted each time. Mouli falls in love with Rishi again and leaves her house to live with him. Prof. Sinha cuts ties with her for good. After some time, it is revealed that Piyush's death was not an accident. The car crash was deliberately caused.

Kashish begins to suspect Sujal of killing her husband and starts believing the false evidence planted against Sujal. With Kashish failing to realize this as a ploy against Sujal and her, Kashish begins deeply hating Sujal and wants to seek revenge. To punish him, Kashish decides to marry Sujal and live close to him to get access to his home and business and to destroy him. Kashish and Sujal do not consummate their marriage after Kashish asks Sujal to give her time. Unaware of Kashish's hatred for him and of Kashish's intentions of not taking this marriage seriously, Sujal respects her decision and assures her to take as much time as she needs. Kashish begins to lay many obstacles in Sujal's path personally and professionally. However, despite trying to hurt Sujal and as time passes by, she finds herself getting attracted towards Sujal again and is drawn to him. The more Kashish tries to shake her revived attraction for Sujal, the stronger she finds herself being pulled towards him. Much to Kashish's dismay, she finds herself fantasizing about Sujal and wanting to get close to him, whilst being torn apart by her commitment to hating Sujal and to seek revenge. To punish herself for thinking that way, Kashish causes a major accident to happen to Sujal and herself as a final showdown where she is ready to lose her life, if it also claims Sujal's life, thus exacting her revenge on Sujal. She fails the breaks of the car that Sujal and she travel in and refuses to jump out of the vehicle to save herself, despite Sujal's multiple pleas and prompting.

Sujal jumps out of the car in the nick of time, whilst the car falls down a steep cliff and erupts into flames immediately. Sujal is devastated and believes he has lost Kashish, but finds relief after he sees her lying unconscious yet deeply wounded close to the bottom of the cliff. Eventually a badly wounded Sujal saves the life of a seriously wounded and unconscious Kashish. In the process of Sujal saving Kashish's life, Sujal ends up with deep abrasive wounds himself. Kashish and Sujal survive the deadly ordeal. When recovering from the accident, Kashish stumbles upon Sujal's diary and learns of Sujal's intense love for her and learns from everyone around her of Sujal's valiant efforts to save her life, while risking his. Kashish feels guilty, is moved and breaks down upon seeing Sujal's wounds. When Kashish sees Sujal nursing to his deep wounds, she offers to aid him. Upon seeing Sujal's wounds that he obtained whilst saving her life, Kashish breaks down in a perplexed Sujal's arms. Kashish and Sujal consummate their marriage. Kashish later regrets letting her emotions and love for Sujal come in the way of her extracting her vengeance.

As Kashish's love for Sujal increases, in order to stop herself from losing track again, she expedites framing Sujal in the SG Enterprises' case and gets him arrested on New Year's Eve. Kashish is secretly heartbroken over Sujal's arrest. Rishi exposes Kashish as the culprit behind Sujal's arrest, and Kashish confesses to her part. While the entire Raheja and Garewal house is shaken by Kashish's betrayal and of her false understanding of Sujal as Piyush's killer, Akshat, Rishi and Kashish's sisters take Sujal's side and are determined to prove him innocent. Kashish has a heated argument with Sujal in jail, wherein she reveals to Sujal her motive behind marrying him. Sujal challenges Kashish to accept that she still loves him and has always only loved him. Kashish is shaken.

Eventually, Kashish begins learning of clues that point towards Sujal's innocence and is startled. To find out the truth, Kashish goes to Piyush's accident spot and learns from a local, the first hand account of how things played out on the day of Piyush's death and Sujal's numerous efforts to save Piyush's life. Kashish having finally learnt the truth breaks down from guilt and remorse. She rushes to the courthouse to interrupt the proceedings and prevent Sujal from getting sentenced. Sujal however to Kashish's shock, confesses to being guilty in the SG Enterprises' case.

Kashish learns from Akshat that Sujal always knew of Kashish's intentions to destroy him and yet surrendered himself to the authorities so that, she is not jailed on account of falsely framing Sujal. Learning this, Kashish is deeply ashamed of herself and of what she put Sujal through. Kashish repents and bitterly weeps before Sujal, who instantly forgives her. Kashish and Sujal reconcile in the Jail. Sujal yet again confesses his love for her, while a teary-eyed Kashish reciprocates this time.

Eventually, Kashish teams up with Akshat and Rishi to free Sujal and Sujal wins the case. With everything back to normal, Sujal and Kashish reunite and rekindle their love and passion for each other. Kashish is now deeply in love with Sujal again and becomes his loyal ally and partner. Vasu who believes that Kashish reconciled with Sujal for the money and to live a wealthy life, gets Sujal arrested again but in the charge of Piyush's murder this time. Kashish is heartbroken and so is the entire family except Vasu. Kashish vows to prove Sujal innocent and to set him free, to live a life with him again.

Eventually, Archie turns out to be Piyush's murderer. Archie was jealous of Sujal's love for Kashish and wanted to get rid of her, but Piyush died in the car crash meant for his wife. With the misunderstandings out of the way, the love between Sujal and Kashish is rekindled. It is revealed that Reva is Chetan's first wife and Swayam and Akshat are Sujal's half-brothers. Swayam is an evil person who starts creating problems for Sujal and his family. Mouli finds out about Rishi's flirtatious behavior behind her back and wants to return home but her father refuses. But the sisters forgive her. She begins to live in another house alone.

On his way to meet Kashish, Sujal has an altercation with some criminals, falls into a river and is presumed dead. (With this, the exit of Rajeev Khandelwal takes place) Kashish and the family are heartbroken and Kashish yearns for Sujal. Hoping against hope, Kashish prays that he is alive somewhere and has survived the ordeal and would return to her, though everyone considers him dead. Sujal survives but loses his memory and undergoes reconstructive surgery. He gets a new face and is known by the name Tushar (played by Gurpreet Singh). He is taken care of by Dr Archita. Tushar soon meets and falls in love with Kashish, not knowing that she is his wife. Kashish feels a sense of familiarity with Tushar and is intrigued by him, but suppresses any feelings because of her love for her dead husband Sujal. Charu soon grows attracted to Tushar and eventually falls for him after misunderstanding Kashish and Akshat to be getting married. Kashish has Tushar marry Charu, and then finds out that he is Sujal. Kashish is heartbroken upon realizing that Tushar is her very own Sujal whom she has loved and missed as much. But given the circumstances, Kashish tells him to stay with his new wife and her sister Charu, seeing how Charu is happy with him and from the guilt of being the reason for Akshat and Charu's separation.

Sujal is defiant and resists Kashish in her pleas. However, Sujal eventually tries to fulfill the duties of a Husband to Charu, for Kashish's sake. Sujal soon separates from Charu when he discovers that she had played tricks to get him. He tries to get close to Kashish once again but Charu is pregnant and ill and has to be in a wheelchair after landing in an accident. Kashish finds out she too is pregnant by Sujal after a one-night stand and immediately regrets it but Sujal is happy. It is then revealed that Charu was faking her illness in order for Sujal to grow closer to her but the truth comes out and everyone shuns her. Kashish and Sujal then reunite. During a party Charu commits suicide leaving Akshat in despair but it is rumored that she was mysteriously killed. Mouli falls for and marries Siddharth, the brother-in-law of a rich man named Shabbir Ahluwalia.

Sujal looks forward to a new life with Kashish. But she learns that the secret of her sister's death can be found within the Ahluwalia family. So, Kashish marries Shabbir Ahluwalia in order to find Charu's killer. Disappointed and heart broken, Sujal wants revenge from Kashish. So he pretends to romance Gayatri, Mr. Ahluwalia's daughter, who works with him. Kashish becomes jealous; although she knows that Sujal is only seeking revenge from her. Mr. Ahluwalia learns about the murderer but is soon killed; Kashish is sent to jail, and Kashish's father is killed. Varun and Mahek get divorced because of mutual differences. She also learns she is pregnant with his child. Mahek marries Rishi to ensure she obtains custody of Roshan, whilst, Varun falls for and marries Shivangi, Mr Ahluwalia's youngest daughter. Soon, Rishi turns over a new leaf and begins to care for Mahek and they start to love each other again. Kashish learns that Siddharth murdered Charu, Mr. Ahluwalia, and Prof. Sinha.

Soon after, Kashish, Rishi and Mahek move to a new town to start afresh. There, they meet Abhishek Chauhan, a navy officer and a look-alike of Piyush (who is later found to be his identical twin). Abhishek is a widower with a young daughter, Sneha. Kashish, Mahek and Rishi begin living happily until Swayam returns. Soon, Rishi dies while saving Sujal which leaves Sujal and Mahek heartbroken. Swayam threatens Kashish that he will frame Sujal for Rishi's murder. To save Sujal, Kashish has to leave him forever. So, she agrees to marry Abhishek. But Abhishek realizes that she is making a sacrifice. He has Sujal and Kashish marry each other. Swayam's evil plans to frame Sujal and harm the Garewals fail. He is killed by Mahek after he stole her child and for killing Rishi.

Five years later, Kashish and Sujal are seen living happily together. Mouli is also there. Abhishek and Mahek, too, are married and living with their children.

== Cast ==
=== Main ===
- Aamna Sharif as Kashish Sinha Garewal – Prof. Sinha's eldest daughter; Mahek, Mauli, Kanan and Charu's sister; Piyush's widow; Sujal's wife
- Rajeev Khandelwal / Gurpreet Singh as Sujal Garewal – Veena and Chetan's elder son; Rishi's brother; Swayam and Akshat's half-brother; Kashish's husband; Charu's ex-husband

=== Recurring ===
- Rohit Bakshi as
  - Piyush Raheja – Lalit and Vasundhra's eldest son; Abhishek, Varun, Sanjana and Aman's brother; Kashish's first husband (Dead)
  - Abhishek Raheja – Lalit and Vasundhra's second son; Piyush, Varun, Sanjana and Aman's brother; Mahek's husband; Sneha's father; Roshan's step-father
- Poonam Joshi / Vaani Sharma as Mahek Sinha Raheja – Prof. Sinha's second daughter; Kashish, Mauli, Kanan and Charu's sister; Varun's ex-wife; Rishi's widow; Abhishek's wife; Roshan's mother; Sneha's step-mother
- Shabir Ahluwalia as Rishi Garewal – Veena and Chetan's younger son; Sujal's brother; Swayam and Akshat's half-brother; Sanjana's ex-husband; Mahek's first husband; Roshan's father (Dead)
- Ashlesha Sawant / Preeti Puri / Ekta Saraiya as Mauli Sinha – Prof. Sinha's third daughter; Kashish, Mahek, Kanan and Charu's sister; Siddharth's ex-wife
- Mitra Joshi / Surveen Chawla as Charu Sinha – Prof. Sinha's youngest daughter; Kashish, Mahek, Mauli and Kanan's sister; Akshat's love interest (Dead)
- Chaitanya Choudhry as Akshat Shergill – Chetan and Reva's younger son; Swayam's brother; Sujal and Rishi's half-brother; Kashish's childhood friend; Charu's love interest
- Vikas Sethi as Swayam Shergill – Chetan and Reva's elder son; Akshat's brother; Sujal and Rishi's half-brother (Dead)
- Kusumit Sana / Kanika Kohli / Keerti Gaekwad Kelkar as Kanan Sinha – Prof. Sinha's fourth daughter; Kashish, Mehak, Mauli and Charu's sister
- Amar Talwar / Chetan Pandit as Prof. Sinha – Kashish, Mehak, Mauli, Kanan and Charu's father; Roshan's grandfather; Sneha's step-grandfather (Dead)
- Rudra Soni / Azaan Ali Khan as Roshan Raheja – Mehak and Rishi's son; Abhishek's step-son; Sneha's half brother
- Madhavi Gogate as Veena Garewal – Chetan's second wife; Sujal and Rishi's mother; Swayam and Akshat's step-mother
- Deepak Parashar as Chetan Garewal – Lalit's best friend; Reva's ex-husband; Veena's husband; Swayam, Akshat, Sujal and Rishi's father
- Eijaz Khan / Manish Raisinghan as Varun Raheja – Lalit and Vasundhara's third son; Piyush, Abhishek, Sanjana and Aman's brother; Mahek's ex-husband; Shivangi's husband; Roshan's first step-father.
- Amit Singh Thakur as Lalit Raheja – Chetan's best friend; Vasundhara's husband; Piyush, Abhishek, Sanjana, Varun and Aman's father; Roshan and Sneha's step-grandfather
- Madhuri Bhatia as Vasundhara Raheja – Lalit's wife; Piyush, Abhishek, Sanjana, Varun and Aman's mother; Roshan and Sneha's step-grandmother
- Dimple Hirji as Sanjana Raheja – Lalit and Vasundhra's daughter; Piyush, Abhishek, Varun and Aman's sister; Rishi's ex-wife
- Bhisham Mansukhani as Aman Raheja – Lalit and Vasundhra's youngest son; Piyush, Abhishek, Sanjana and Varun's brother
- Anju Mahendru as Reva Shergill – Chetan's first wife; Swayam and Akshat's mother
- Neetha Shetty as Dr. Archita – Face Surgeon; Tushar's friend
- Ravee Gupta / Urvashi Dholakia as Archie Khanna – Sujal's ex-fiancée
- Tinnu Anand as Shabbir Ahluwalia – Kartik, Gayatri and Shivangi's father (Dead)
- Aashka Goradia as Gayatri Ahluwalia – Shabbir's elder daughter; Kartik and Shivangi's sister; Sujal's ex-fiancée
- Anokhi Anand as Shivangi Ahluwali Raheja – Shabbir's younger daughter; Gayatri and Kartik's sister; Varun's second wife
- Anas Rashid as Kartik Ahluwalia / Suraj - Shabbir's son; Gayatri and Shivangi's brother
- Mrinal Deshraj as Shipra Arora – Shabbir's sister-in-law
- Siddharth Vasudev as Siddharth Arora – Shabbir's brother-in-law; Mauli's ex-husband; Shabbir, Charu and Prof. Sinha's murderer
- Hiten Tejwani as Pratham – Sujal's friend
- Rajendra Sethi as Inspector Rana
- Parul Chauhan as many characters
- Amita Chandekar as Anu – Pratham's wife
- Nikhil Arya as Rahul Singhania
- Jennifer Winget as Svetlana
- Parul Chauhan as Receptionist
- Panchi Bora as Prachi Shah
- Tina Parekh
- Sonia Kapoor as Ritika – Piyush & Abhishek’s biological mother; Vasu’s sister
- Rocky Verma as Contract Killer
- Shweta Tiwari as Prerna

== Development ==
The series was titled as Kashish but was renamed to Kahiin To Hoga before premiere.

== Reception ==
Kahiin started with a rating of 5 TVR in the premiere week at number 31 of most watched Hindi television series but gradually increased and entered top 10 programs.

Kahiin to hoga became one of the most popular Indian television programs by achieved the milestone of getting TVR of 10.77 in second week of 2005, despite aired at 11:00 pm (IST) slot. From January to November 2004, it averaged 8.8 TVR being the fourth most watched Hindi GEC. In December 2004, it averaged 9.35 TVR. In second week of 2005, it garnered 14.54, 10.36 and 10.71 TVR in Mumbai, Delhi and Kolkata areas.

After the exit of Rajeev Khandelwal in early 2005, the ratings decreased. However, with the entry of Tinnu Anand, it started to increase again and increased even more with his character's death which got 7.18 TVR in August 2006 being the fourth most watched Hindi show.

The show went off air despite being in top 10 show as makers of the show felt that story became stretching after the exit of Rajeev Khandelwal who was replaced by Gurpreet Singh. The show to this date is remembered as a classic during Golden Period of Indian television fiction.

=== Critics ===
Mid-Day stated that the series was popular mainly because of the lead characters Kashish and Sujal's crackling chemistry.

== Awards and nominations ==
Year	Award	Category	Nominee	Status
2004	Star Parivaar Awards	Favorite Jodi	Rajeev Khandelwal & Aamna Sharif	Won
2004	Indian Telly Awards	Best Onscreen Couple	Rajeev Khandelwal & Aamna Sharif	Won
2004	Indian Telly Awards	Best Daily Serial	Ekta Kapoor & Shobha Kapoor for 'Kahiin to Hoga'	Won
2004	Indian Telly Awards	Best TV Personality of the Year	Rajeev Khandelwal as 'Sujal Garewal'	Won
2004	Indian Telly Awards	Best Fresh New Face	Rajeev Khandelwal	Won
2004	Indian Telly Awards	Best Fresh New Face	Aamna Sharif	Won
2004	Indian Telly Awards	Best Actor in a Negative Role	Shabbir Ahluwalia	Won
2004	Indian Telly Awards	Best Actor	Rajeev Khandelwal	Nominated
2004	Indian Telly Awards	Best Actress	Aamna Sharif	Nominated
2004	Indian Telly Awards	Best Screenplay Writer (Drama Series)	Salil Sand	Nominated
2004	Indian Telly Awards	Best TV Programme of the Year	Kahiin to hoga	Nominated
2005	Star Parivaar Awards	Favorite Jodi	Rajeev Khandelwal & Aamna Sharif	Won
2005	Star Parivaar Awards	Favorite Patni	Aamna Sharif	Won
2005	Indian Telly Awards	Logitech Style Icon of the Year (Female)	Aamna Sharif for Kahiin to Hoga	Won
2005	MTV Lycra Style Awards	Most Stylish Persona (Male)	Rajeev Khandelwal	Won
2005	MTV Lycra Style Awards	Most Style Actor on TV	Rajeev Khandelwal	Won
2006	Star Parivaar Awards	Favorite Damaad	Chaitanya Choudhary	Won
2006	Star Parivaar Awards	Favorite Behen	Aamna Sharif	Won
2006	Star Parivaar Awards	Favorite Devar	Shabbir Ahluwalia	Won
2006	Indian Telly Awards	Best Actress	Aamna Sharif	Won
2006	Indian Telly Awards	Best Actor in a Supporting Role	Shabbir Ahluwalia	Nominated
2006	Indian Telly Awards	Best Actress in a Supporting Role	Surveen Chawla	Nominated
2006	Indian Telly Awards	Best Actor in a Negative Role	Vikas Sethi	Nominated
2006	Indian Telly Awards	Best Daily Serial	Kahiin to Hoga	Nominated
2007	Star Parivaar Awards	Favorite Bhai	Shabbir Ahluwalia	Won
2008	Indian Telly Awards	Special Commendations	Rajeev Khandelwal for 'pathbreaking' success in TV as Sujal Garewal & transition to Cinema	Won
2009	Indian Telly Awards	Special Commendations	Aamna Sharif for 'pathbreaking' success in TV as Kashish Garewal & transition to Cinema	Won

== Soundtrack ==
Track #	Title	Singer(s)	Lyricist	Music composer(s)
1	"Title Track"	Priya Bhattacharya	Nawab Arzoo	Lalit Sen
2	"Thodasa Pyar Hua Hai" (Sad)	Sonu Nigam	Nawab Arzoo	Lalit Sen
3	"Thodasa Pyar Hua Hai Maine Dil Tujhko Diya"	Udit Narayan, Alka Yagnik	Nawab Arzoo	Lalit Sen
4	"Tum Mil Gaye"	Junaid Jamshed	Rohail Hyatt	Salman Ahmad
5	"Pyar"	Junaid Jamshed	Shoaib Mansoor	Salman Ahmad. EMI
6	"Aisa Na Ho Yeh Din"	Vital Signs	Shahi Hassan	Rohail Hyatt. EMI
