= Fakebook =

Fakebook may refer to:

- Fakebook (album), the fourth studio album by American indie rock band Yo La Tengo
- Lead sheet (also a fake book), a form of musical notation that specifies the essential elements of a popular song

== See also ==
- Fakebook with Kavita, Indian satirical sketch comedy television series
