= Anas Rashid =

Indian actor

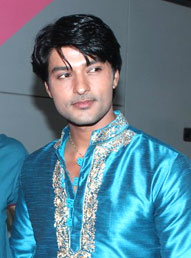
- Rashid in 2012
- Born: 31 August 1980 (age 45) or 31 August 1981 (age 44); Malerkotla, Punjab, India
- Occupation: Actor
- Years active: 2006–present
- Spouse: Heena Iqbal (m. 2017)
- Children: 2

Anas Rashid (born 31 August 1980/81) is an Indian actor who works in Hindi television. He is known for portraying Prithviraj Chauhan in the historical drama Dharti Ka Veer Yodha Prithviraj Chauhan (2006–09) and later as Sooraj Rathi in the soap opera Diya Aur Baati Hum (2011–16), which ranked among the highest-rated Indian television series.

== Early life ==
Rashid was born on 31 August 1980 or 1981 in Malerkotla into a Muslim family. He has two brothers and two sisters. Rashid did his schooling from an Urdu Medium School and has done his post-graduation in psychology. He is a polyglot who fluents in Urdu, Punjabi, Arabic and Persian languages. Rashid is a well trained singer and also won the title of Mr. Punjab in 2004.

== Career ==
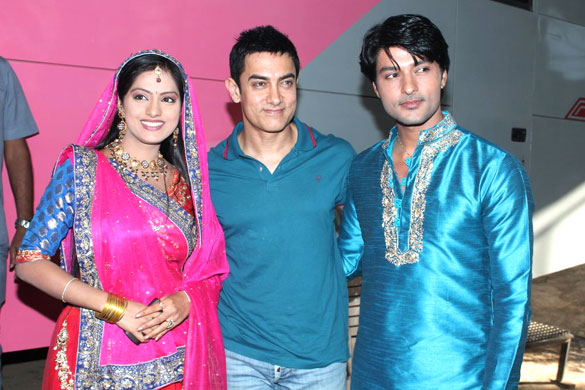
Rashid with Deepika Singh and Aamir Khan in 2012

Rashid made his screen debut with the Star Plus drama Kahiin To Hoga as Kartik Ahluwalia. He went on to feature in a supporting role in the drama Aise Karo Naa Vidaa. However, Rashid's breakthrough role was the portrayal of Prithviraj Chauhan, in the historical drama Dharti Ka Veer Yodha Prithviraj Chauhan on Star Plus, which made him a household name in India. Anas worked as the male lead in Diya Aur Baati Hum, where he portrayed the role of Sooraj Rathi. Rashid also marked his singing debut during his time in the series as well. Diya Aur Baati Hum ranked among the highest-rated Indian television serials. Rashid's performance in the series earned him wide recognition as well as several accolades. In 2018, he made his feature film debut in the Punjabi film Nankana starring Gurdas Maan.

== Personal life ==
Rashid married Heena Iqbal, a corporate professional from Chandigarh, on 10 September 2017. They have a daughter named Aayat Anas Rashid (born 11 February 2019), and a son named Khabib Anas Rashid (born 16 December 2020).

== Filmography ==
=== Television ===
Year(s)	Show	Role	Notes	Ref
2006–2007	Kahiin To Hoga	Kartik Ahluwalia	Soap opera	
2006–2007	Kyaa Hoga Nimmo Kaa	Karan Sehgal	Television series	
2007–2009	Dharti Ka Veer Yodha Prithviraj Chauhan	Prithviraj Chauhan / Surya	Indian historical drama; also main role	
2010	Aise Karo Naa Vidaa	Prince Yashwardha	Television series; also main role	
2011–2016	Diya Aur Baati Hum	Sooraj Rathi	Television soap opera; also main role	
2017	Tu Sooraj, Main Saanjh Piyaji	Sooraj Rathi	Guest appearance	

=== Film ===
Year	Film	Role	Notes
2018	Nankana	Himself	Punjabi movie; also main role

Anas Rashid awards and nominations
Awards and nominations
Award	Wins	Nominations
Indian Television Academy Awards	1	3
Indian Telly Awards	1	6
Lion Gold Awards	1	0
Zee Gold Awards	0	2

Totals (Note: Certain award groups do not simply award one winner. They acknowledge several different recipients, have runners-up, and have third place. Since this is a specific recognition and is different from losing an award, runner-up mentions are considered wins in this award tally. For simplification and to avoid errors, each award in this list has been presumed to have had a prior nomination.)
- Wins: 3
- Nominations: 11

== Awards and nominations ==
=== Indian Telly Awards ===
Year	Category	Nominated work	Result
2012	Best Actor in a lead Role	Diya Aur Baati Hum	Nominated
2012	Best Onscreen Couple (with Deepika Singh)	Diya Aur Baati Hum	Nominated
2013	Best Actor in a lead Role	Diya Aur Baati Hum	Won
2013	Best Onscreen Couple (with Deepika Singh)	Diya Aur Baati Hum	Nominated
2014	Best Actor in a lead Role	Diya Aur Baati Hum	Nominated
2015	Best Actor in a lead Role	Diya Aur Baati Hum	Nominated
2015	Best Onscreen Couple (with Deepika Singh)	Diya Aur Baati Hum	Nominated

=== Lion Gold Awards ===
Year	Category	Nominated work	Result
2012	Best Onscreen Couple (with Deepika Singh)	Diya Aur Baati Hum	Won

=== Indian Television Academy Awards ===
Year	Category	Nominated work	Result
2012	Best Actor - Jury	Diya Aur Baati Hum	Nominated
2013	Best Actor - Drama	Diya Aur Baati Hum	Won
2014	Best Drama Actor	Diya Aur Baati Hum	Nominated
2014	Desh Ka Sitara – Best Actor (Popular)	Diya Aur Baati Hum	Nominated

=== Zee Gold Awards ===
Year	Category	Nominated work	Result
2012	Best Actor In A Lead Role (Male)	Diya Aur Baati Hum	Nominated
2012	Best Celebrity Jodi (with Deepika Singh)	Diya Aur Baati Hum	Nominated

=== Others accomplishments ===
Awarded by UP Government

Year	Category	Recipient	Result
2015	Achievement in Acting Profession	Anas Rashid	Won
