= Fakebook with Kavita =

- Genre: Satirical; Sketch comedy
- Created by: Tarun Katial
- Based on: Inside Amy Schumer
- Presented by: Kavita Kaushik
- Starring: See below
- Country of origin: India
- Original language: Hindi
- No. of seasons: 01
- No. of episodes: 32

Production
- Producer: Tarun Katial
- Production locations: Mumbai, Maharashtra, India
- Camera setup: Multi-camera
- Production company: Reliance Broadcast Network

Original release
- Network: BIG Magic; BIG FM 92.7
- Release: 19 October 2015 – 2 February 2016

Fakebook with Kavita is an Indian satirical sketch comedy television series, which premiered on 19 October 2015 and is broadcast on BIG Magic and BIG FM 92.7. The series is based on American television series Inside Amy Schumer.

The series was aired on Monday and Tuesday nights. The series is produced by Reliance Broadcast Network of Tarun Katial. Fakebook with Kavita showcases all the fake faces of the Indian society through small skits. The series is hosted by Kavita Kaushik, who is seen playing different characters in different situations, which she likes doing. The series also feature artists like Kunal Kumar and Manju Sharma.

== Host ==
- Kavita Kaushik

== Cast ==
- Kunal Kumar
- Manju Sharma
