= Tuyul & Mbak Yul Reborn =

Indonesian soap opera

- Genre: Musical Comedy Drama
- Created by: Raam Punjabi
- Directed by: Taka Rich
- Starring: Megi Irawan; Pamela Bowie; Bhavesh Balchandani; Harshita Ojha; Vaishali Thakkar; Ruhanika Dhawan; Faisal Khan; Mrunal Thakur; Shakti Arora; Shaheer Sheikh; Shah Rukh Khan; Kiesha Alvaro; Rony Dozer; Jessica Torsten
- Theme music composer: Nathanael P Winarto
- Opening theme: Tuyul & Mbak Yul
- Ending theme: Tuyul & Mbak Yul
- Country of origin: Indonesia
- Original language: Indonesian
- No. of seasons: 1
- No. of episodes: 118

Production
- Executive producers: Gobind Punjabi; Anita Whora
- Producer: Raam Punjabi
- Production locations: Jakarta, Indonesia
- Running time: One hour (10:00-11:00am Indonesian Western Time)
- Production company: Tripar Multivision Plus

Original release
- Network: antv
- Release: September 25, 2016 – January 27, 2017

Tuyul & Mbak Yul Reborn is an Indonesian soap opera produced by Tripar Multivision Plus. It first aired on ANTV on September 25, 2016.

The comedy film based on Tuyul & Mbak Yul: Reborn series originally planned in 2019 by Tripar Multivison Plus, due to the COVID-19 pandemic in 2020, the Tuyul & Mbak Yul The Movie shooting had to be temporarily canceled.

== Synopsis ==
Ucil (Megi Irawan) who chose to retire took the money man. In his flight from King Toyol, Ucil saved by Yuli alias Mbak Yul (Pamela Bowie). Ucil pursued two executioners, but have friends who protect her, Kentung (Rony Dozer). Rocky (Stuart Collin) were chatty and jealous.

== Cast ==
- Megi Irawan as Ucil
- Pamela Bowie as Yulia
- Stuart Collin as Rocky
- Asep Jaya as Asep
- Ery Makmur as Kenting
- Rony Dozer as Kentung
- Rurin Nirmala as Ibu Guru
- Aga Dirgantara as Aji
- Jessica Torsten as Jessy
- Sayudi as Ucul
- Mueng Engingeng as Ocol
- Nesya Chandria as Laras
- Keisha Alvaro as Radit
- Naguita Aurora as Mimi
- Arzenda as Udin
- Boim Imoet as Mr. Raja Tuyul

== Guest stars ==
- Bhavesh Balchandani
- Harshita Ojha
- Vaishali Thakkar
- Ruhanika Dhawan
- Faisal Khan
- Mrunal Thakur
- Shakti Arora
