= Indian Telly Award for Best Child Artiste – Female =

Indian awards for TV serials

- Awarded for: Best performance by a female child actor in a comic role on television
- Country: India
- Presented by: IndianTelevision.com
- First award: 2003
- Currently held by: Asmi Deol for Anupamaa
- Website: Indian Telly Awards

Indian Telly Award for Best Child Artiste – Female is an award given by Indiantelevision.com as part of its annual Indian Telly Awards for TV serials, to recognize a female actor who has delivered an outstanding performance on television.

The award was first awarded in 2003 under the title TV Child Artiste of the Year for a performance by either sex. Next year, it was officially divided into two separate categories to acknowledge both male and female actors individually.

== Superlatives ==
Superlative	Best Child Artiste – Female	
Actress with most awards	Swini Khara; Avika Gor	2
Actress with most nominations	Chinky Jaiswal	5
Actress with most nominations (without ever winning)	Tanvi Hegde	3

== List of winners ==
=== Child Artiste of the Year ===
- 2001 Not Awarded
- 2002 Not Awarded
- 2003 Hansika Motwani – Des Mein Niklla Hoga Chand as Tina
  - Mausami – Kyunki Saas Bhi Kabhi Bahu Thi as Saawari
  - Swapnali Kulkarni – Kasautii Zindagii Kay as Kuki
  - Tanvi Hegde – Sonpari as Frooty
  - Male nominees

=== Child Artiste – Female ===
- 2004 Shriya Sharma – Kasautii Zindagii Kay as Sneha
  - Tanvi Hegde – Sonpari as Frooty
  - Hansika Motwani – Des Mein Niklla Hoga Chand as Tina
  - Akshita Garud – Kumkum – Ek Pyara Sa Bandhan as Roshini
  - Richa Bhadra – Khichdi as Chakki
- 2005 Chinky Jaiswal – Kyunki Saas Bhi Kabhi Bahu Thi as Bhoomi
  - Tanvi Hegde – Sonpari as Frooty
  - Shriya Sharma – Kasautii Zindagii Kay as Sneha
  - Chinky Jaiswal – Kkusum as Simi
- 2006 Swini Khara – Baa Bahoo Aur Baby as Chaitali Thakkar
  - Chinky Jaiswal – Dharti Ka Veer Yodha Prithviraj Chauhan as Vedika
  - Chinky Jaiswal – Jassi Jaissi Koi Nahin as Preetha
  - Khushi Dubey – Kaisa Ye Pyar Hai as Sur
- 2007 Swini Khara – Baa Bahoo Aur Baby as Chaitali Thakkar
  - Rudrakshi – Kasautii Zindagii Kay as Kanishta
  - Rudrakshi – Kayamath as Prachi
  - Chinky Jaiswal – Durgesh Nandinii as Nikita
  - Benazir Shaikh – Agadam Bagdam Tigdam as Sonia Malhotra
- 2008 Avika Gor – Balika Vadhu as Anandi
  - Khushi Dubey – Naaginn – Waadon Ki Agniparikshaa as Amrita
  - Ishita Panchal – Woh Rehne Waali Mehlon Ki as Rani
  - Ahsaas Channa – Kasamh Se as Ganga
  - Swini Khara – Baa Bahoo Aur Baby as Chaitali Thakkar
- 2009 Avika Gor – Balika Vadhu as Anandi
  - Ishita Panchal – Uttaran as Tapasya
  - Sparsh Khanchandani – Uttaran as Ichchha
  - Zaynah Vastani – Aapki Antara as Antara
  - Akshita Rajput – Bandini as Mongi
- 2010 Ulka Gupta – Jhansi Ki Rani as Manu
  - Avika Gor – Balika Vadhu as Anandi
  - Prachi Deshmukh – Tere Liye as Tani
  - Reem Sheikh – Neer Bhare Tere Naina Devi as Devi
  - Saloni Daini – Comedy Circus – Maha Sangram as Saloni
- 2011 No Award
- 2012 Aanchal Munjal – Parvarrish – Kuchh Khattee Kuchh Meethi as aka Raave Ahuja
  - Sparsh Khanchandani – Parvarrish – Kuchh Khattee Kuchh Meethi as Raashi Ahuja
  - Jannat Zubair Rehmani – Phulwa as Phulwa
  - Khusali Hirani – Haar Jeet as Mahika
  - Palak Jain – Veer Shivaji as Rani Saibai
- 2013 Amrita Mukherjee – Bade Achhe Lagte Hain as Pihu Ram Kapoor
  - Harishita Ojha – Ek Veer Ki Ardaas...Veera as Veera Kaur Sampooran Singh
  - Ahsaas Channa – Devon Ke Dev...Mahadev as Ashok Sundari
  - Ashnoor Kaur – Na Bole Tum Na Maine Kuch Kaha as Navika Mohan Bhatnagar
  - Palak Dey – Punar Vivah as Palak Yash Sindhia
- 2014 Ruhanika Dhawan – Yeh Hai Mohabbatein as Ruhi Raman Bhalla
  - Harshita Ojha – Ek Veer Ki Ardaas...Veera as Veera
  - Roshni Walia – Bharat Ka Veer Putra – Maharana Pratap as Ajabde Punwar
  - Drishti Hemdev – Pavitra Bandhan as Misthi
- 2015 Ruhana Khanna – Gangaa as Gangaa
  - Ruhanika Dhawan – Yeh Hai Mohabbatein as Ruhi Raman Bhalla
  - Spandan Chaturvedi – Udaan as Chakor
- 2019 Aakriti Sharma – Kullfi Kumar Bajewala as Kulfi
- 2023 Asmi Deol – Anupamaa as Anu Kapadia

== See also ==
- Indian Telly Award for Best Child Artiste – Male
