= Nankana (film) =

- Directed by: Manjeet Maan
- Starring: Gurdas Maan; Kavita Kaushik; Gurmeet Saajan; Anas Rashid
- Music by: Jatinder Shah
- Release date: 6 July 2018
- Running time: 128 mins
- Country: India
- Language: Punjabi language

Nankana is a Punjabi language movie released on 6 July 2018. Gurdas Maan played the lead role in the movie along with Kavita Kaushik, and Gurmeet Sajan. Gurdas Maan made a comeback on big screen after four years. The film was directed by Manjeet Maan.

== Plot ==
Nankana revolves around the strong bond between a father and a son. Karma must protect his adopted son (Born to a Muslim) from people due to riots as well as from his evil brother Taari.

== Cast ==
- Gurdas Maan
- Kavita Kaushik
- Anas Rashid
- Gurmeet Saajan

== Soundtracks ==
Song	Singer
"Shagna Di Mehandi"	Gurdas Maan, Sunidhi Chauhan
"Kive Karaange Guzara"	Gurdas Maan
"Uccha Dar Babe Nanak Da"	Gurdas Maan
"Giddhey Vich"	Gurdas Maan
Theme Song	Jyoti Nooran
