= Vaishali Thakkar =

Indian theatre and television actress

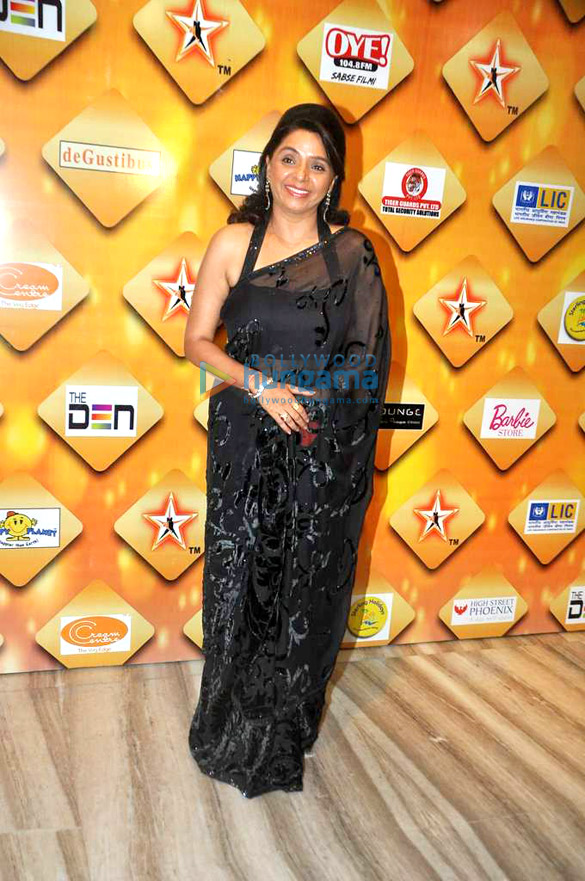
- Thakkar in December 2013
- Born: Vaishali Thakkar; Bombay, Maharashtra, India
- Occupation: Actress
- Years active: 1999–present
- Known for: Baa Bahoo Aur Baby; Uttaran

Vaishali Thakkar is an Indian theatre and television actress. She portrayed the comic role of Praveena in the Star Plus TV series Baa Bahoo Aur Baby, the supporting role of Damini in the Colors TV TV series Uttaran and Kusum in the Star Plus television series Saath Nibhaana Saathiya 2.

== Career ==
Vaishali Thakkar was born in Mumbai. Her father worked in Gujarati theatre, and she first appeared in Gujarati plays. She had a role in the TV series Ek Mahal Ho Sapno Ka, and then in Baa Bahoo Aur Baby where she played Praveena. She subsequently appeared as Damini Ragendra Bharti in the Colors TV series, Uttaran.

Thakkar is fluent in English, Hindi, and Gujarati.

== Filmography ==
=== Films ===
Year	Title	Role	Notes
2011	Angel	Priya Chawla	Debut film
2026	Jai Kanhaiyalall Ki	Pushpa	First Gujarati Film

=== Television ===
Year	Title	Role	Notes
1999–2002	Ek Mahal Ho Sapno Ka	Bharti	
2000	Kahani Saat Pheron Ki	Savri	
2000–2004	Shaka Laka Boom Boom	Lalita	
2004	Shubh Mangal Savadhan	Sonu	
2004–2005	Main Office Tere Aangan Ki	Susheela	
2004–2006	Sarabhai vs Sarabhai	Nilima Verma	Guest appearance in episode 30 of season 1
2005–2008	Baa Bahoo Aur Baby	Praveena Thakkar	2005: Won — ITA Award for Best Actress in a Supporting Role; 2006: Won — Gold Award for Best Actress in a Supporting Role
2006–2009	Teen Bahuraaniyaan	Maya Gheewala	
2008–2015	Uttaran	Damini Rajendra Bharti	2010: Won — ITA Award for Best Actress in a Supporting Role; 2011: Won — BIG Television Awards
2009	Shakuntala	Maharani Gandhari	
2014	Bharat Ka Veer Putra – Maharana Pratap	Maan Kanwar	
2015	Baal Veer	Hany (Dadi Bua)	
2015	Diya Aur Baati Hum	Manjari	
2016	Malaikat Kecil Dari India	Mrs. Behnaz	
2016	Tuyul & Mbak Yul Reborn	Herself	Guest
2016–2017	Yeh Vaada Raha	Kaki	
2017	Har Mard Ka Dard		
2018–2019	Roop - Mard Ka Naya Swaroop	Kaushalya Ben	
2018	Saat Phero Ki Hera Pherie	Jigna Ben	
2020	Maddam Sir	Head Constable/Warden Babita Sarkar	Guest appearance
2021	Saath Nibhaana Saathiya 2	Kusum Patel	
2021	Kuch Toh Hai: Naagin Ek Naye Rang Mein	Priya's former guardian	Cameo
2022	Sanjog	Sarita	
2023–2024	Ghum Hai Kisikey Pyaar Meiin	Surekha Yashwant Bhosle	
2025	Jhanak	Ketki Parekh	
