= Diya Aur Baati Hum =

Indian television soap opera (2011)

- Genre: Drama
- Created by: Sumeet Hukamchand Mittal; Shashi Mittal
- Written by: Shashi Sumeet Mittal; Sumeet Hukamchand Mittal; Raghuvir Shekhawat; Seema Mantri
- Directed by: Sumeet Hukamchand Mittal; Rohit Raj Goyal; Maqbool Khan; Akaashdeep Chhetri; Sudesh Kotian; Rashid Beg; Jitendra Kadam
- Creative director: Shweta Bishnoi Creative Head- Prabhjyot Gujral
- Opening theme: "Diya Aur Baati Hum" by Shubha Mudgal and Kailash Kher
- Country of origin: India
- Original language: Hindi
- No. of seasons: 1
- No. of episodes: 1,491

Production
- Editors: Jay B Ghadiali; Saurabh Khanna
- Running time: 20–23 minutes
- Production company: Shashi Sumeet Productions

Original release
- Network: StarPlus
- Release: 29 August 2011 – 10 September 2016

Related
- Tu Sooraj Main Saanjh, Piyaji

Diya Aur Baati Hum (transl. We Are the Lamp and the Wick) is an Indian television soap opera that aired on StarPlus from 29 August 2011 to 10 September 2016 comprising 1,487 episodes. It was produced under Shashi Sumeet Productions starring Anas Rashid and Deepika Singh.

Set on the backdrop of Pushkar, Rajasthan, Diya Aur Baati Hum focused on breaking the stereotypical image of women in rural India by showing the inspirational journey of Sandhya Rathi, whose ambition is to become an IPS officer. She achieves her goal with the help of her husband, Sooraj, by going against all odds.

A sequel series, Tu Sooraj Main Saanjh, Piyaji starring Rhea Sharma and Avinesh Rekhi, aired from 3 April 2017 to 1 June 2018.

== Plot ==
Ambitious and educated, Sandhya Kothari aspires to fulfill her dream of being an IPS officer for her father Arvind. Sooraj Rathi, a partially-educated and simple young master-confectioner is the perfect elder heir to his middle-class traditional family in Pushkar, Rajasthan. Later, Sandhya is shattered as her parents die in a terrorist attack. Her brother Ankur fixes her marriage to Sooraj whose strict mother, Santosh, wants a simple and uneducated daughter-in-law, with the excellent skills of a housewife. So, Ankur lies about Sandhya's education level and hides the truth about Sooraj to her.

Giving up her education and dreams, Sandhya marries Sooraj. Learning the truth about Ankur's lies Sandhya is disappointed and her distant behaviour confuses Sooraj. Despite initial struggles she gradually bonds with Sooraj seeing his Kind and patient nature. As soon as her truth of being educated and not knowing household skills is revealed, Santosh hates her. Sooraj stands up for her and vows to help Sandhya become the daughter-in-law Santosh wants. Sandhya goes through many troubles but manages to win Santosh's acceptance and with time falls in love with Sooraj. She helps Sooraj win an international cooking competition in Singapore and manages to save Pushkar from a terrorist attack. She forgives Ankur who in order to rectify his mistake helps Sooraj learn about Sandhya's IPS dreams. Despite Santosh being against it Sooraj helps her complete her studies and after facing various challenges manages to convince Santosh to accept her dreams.

Sandhya faces challenges in IPS Academy, establishing as an extraordinary police officer. She struggles to balance between her professional duties and domestic responsibilities but with Sooraj help she is successful. Together with Sooraj, Sandhya forms a relationship with underlying love which is put to test after battling Raj Kumar (a terrorist whose allies hijack the plane which Sooraj and Santosh are travelling in) but emerge victorious. She donates one of her kidneys to Santosh battling for life after the attack, a fact which the family later learns. Ankur's daughter Bulbul greatly wishes for a sibling but his wife Ankita miscarries and is unable to conceive again. Sandhya, expecting twins, decides to give their one twin to Ankita. Eventually, she delivers twin sons Ved and Vansh who get kidnapped. In the rescue, Ved is saved and the unfound Vansh is presumed dead, shattering all. A police officer saves and returns Vansh though promptly. Ankur ends his relationship with Sandhya and takes Vansh with him feeling that Vansh can never be truly theirs otherwise.

=== 7 years later ===
Sandhya, Sooraj and Ved live happily. They cross paths with Vansh who studies in the same school as Ved. Bulbul who is unaware of the past attempts to reunite the families after realizing the truth and with the help of Santosh is successful. Ankur realizes his mistakes and reunites with Sandhya. As Sooraj dreams of opening a big hotel and works for it with Sandhya, she is appointed for an extremely perilous mission Mahabhali, to defeat a dangerous terrorist in his territory in West Bengal, faking her identity as Sagarika. Sandhya leaves and enacts to be presumed dead in a train accident. Sooraj loses his dreams and mental stability due to this shock. Due to his condition, Santosh starts hating Sandhya.

Santosh wants Sooraj to marry Laalima Agarwal, who she believes will be able to help him recover. Sandhya battles with the difficulties of Mahabhali and finally sabotages their plan, but her identity is exposed. The terrorists capture and almost torture her to death. Sooraj finds out Sandhya is alive, and joins her on the mission to help. They complete the mission and return home. Santosh refuses to forgive Sandhya and Laalima who has fallen in love with Sooraj lies that she is his wife.

Eventually Sooraj and Sandhya's love wins and Santosh forgives her. Sooraj reveals to Laalima that he knew her truth all along but didn't expose her as he respects her greatly leading to Laalima realizing her mistakes. Later, Sooraj's youngest brother Mohit is killed after attempting to molest Laalima by Santosh. With the help of women's rights activists, Sandhya bails her out. The Rathi family celebrate Laalima and Pramod's wedding.

Santhosh hates Pakistan because of a tragic accident on the border which took her younger brother's life when they were children. Not knowing Arzoo is from Pakistan, she fixes her alliance with Aryan (whom she adopts after his grandmother's death). At first, Sandhya suspects Arzoo of being a terrorist.

Later, Sandhya not only saves Arzoo from the terrible misunderstanding but also helps her get accepted by Santosh. Sandhya and Sooraj battle superstition and later help expose Poorvi's crimes (Sooraj cousin Om's obsessed wife). Sooraj meets with an accident and gets stuck in a wheelchair. Sandhya decides to run his confectionery shop by leaving her job, much to Sooraj, and the family's displeasure.

As Sandhya delivers a daughter named Kanak, Sooraj overcomes his disability and is able to walk to run his shop. Sandhya gets a proposal from commissioner and joins the police again before meeting IPS Arpita Khanna, who considers Sandhya as her rival at first but later becomes among her best allies and assists her in solving various cases.

Soon, Vansh discovers the truth about his birth parents but hates them for giving him away. Four terrorists kill Ankur and Ankita and also take the residents of the Rathis' neighborhood hostage, including them. Sandhya and Sooraj bravely rescue the civilians.

Upon seeing his parents' selflessness and courage, Vansh forgives them and the family is reunited, but not for long. Sandhya and Sooraj unsuccessfully try a trap for the terrorists and punish them. The leader kidnaps Kanak and makes Sandhya and Sooraj eat bomb pills.

Sandhya and Sooraj bid their farewell to family and others by jumping into the river before exploding. Sandhya's mangal sutra and Sooraj's chain becomes entangled in the water before the setting Sun, highlighting that even death cannot separate them.

== Cast ==
=== Main ===
- Deepika Singh as IPS Sandhya Rathi (née Kothari): Arvind and Kanchan's daughter; Ankur's sister; Sooraj's wife; Ved, Vansh and Kanak's mother (2011–2016)
- Anas Rashid as Sooraj Rathi: Arun and Santosh's eldest son; Vikram, Mohit and Chavvi's brother; Aryan's adoptive brother; Sandhya's husband; Ved, Vansh and Kanak's father (2011–2016)
  - Runav Shah as Toddler Sooraj (2016)

=== Recurring ===
- Deepak Gheewala as Mr. Rathi (Dado Sa): Krishna's husband; Arun's father; Sooraj, Vikram, Om, Mohit and Chhavi's grandfather; Mishri, Pari, Golu, Ved, Vansh, Sparsh and Kanak's great-grandfather (2012–2013)
- Ragini Shah as Krishna Rathi (Maa Sa): Matriach of Rathi family; Dado Sa's wife; Arun's mother; Sooraj, Vikram, Om, Mohit and Chhavi's grandmother; Mishri, Pari, Golu, Ved, Vansh, Sparsh and Kanak's great-grandmother (2012; 2013–2016)
- Ashok Lokhande as Arun "Bhabasa" Rathi: Krishna and Mr. Rathi's son;;Santosh's husband; Sooraj, Vikram, Mohit and Chhavi's father; Aryan's adoptive father; Mishri, Pari, Golu, Ved, Vansh and Kanak's grandfather (2011–2016)
- Neelu Vaghela as Santosh "Bhaboo" Rathi: Arun's wife; Sooraj, Vikram, Mohit and Chhavi's mother; Aryan's adoptive mother; Mishri, Pari, Golu, Ved, Vansh and Kanak's grandmother. (2011–2016)
- Devyansh Tapuriah as Ved Rathi: Sooraj and Sandhya's elder son; Vansh and Kanak's brother (2015–2016)
- Ricky Patel as Vansh Rathi: Sooraj and Sandhya's younger son; Ankur and Ankita's foster son; Ved and Kanak's brother (2015–2016)
- Kiara Bhatt as Kanak Rathi: Sooraj and Sandhya's daughter; Ved and Vansh's sister (2016)
- Gautam Gulati / Abeer Singh Godhwani as Vikram Rathi: Santosh and Arun's second son; Sooraj, Mohit and Chhavi's brother; Aryan's adoptive brother; Meenakshi's husband; Mishri and Golu's father (2011–2014) / (2014–2016)
- Kanika Maheshwari as Meenakshi "Meena" Rathi: Uma's elder daughter; Sudha's sister; Vikram's wife; Mishri and Golu's mother (2011–2016)
- Reem Sheikh as Mishri Rathi: Vikram and Meenakshi's daughter; Golu's sister (2015–2016)
- Sadhil Kapoor / Kiran Mohnani as Golu Rathi: Vikram and Meenakshi's son; Mishri's brother (2015–2016)
- Varun Jain as Mohit Rathi: Santosh and Arun's youngest son; Sooraj, Vikram and Chhavi's brother; Aryan's adoptive brother; Emily's first husband; Pari's father (2011–2015) (Dead)
- Pooja Singh as Emily D'Souza Rathi: David and Angela's daughter; Mark's sister; Mohit's widow; Om's second wife; Pari's mother; Sparsh's step-mother (2013–2016)
- Drisha Kalyani as Pari Rathi: Emily and Mohit's daughter; Om's step-daughter; Sparsh's half-sister (2015–2016)
- Abhinav Shukla as Om Rathi: Sooraj, Vikram, Mohit and Chhavi's cousin; Poorvi's ex-husband; Emily's second husband; Sparsh's father; Pari's step-father (2016)
- Pooja Sharma as Poorvi: Om's ex-wife; Sparsh's mother.(2016)
- Advait Adi as Sparsh Rathi: Om and Poorvi's son; Emily's step-son; Pari's half-brother (2016)
- Sehrish Ali as Chhavi Rathi: Santosh and Arun's daughter; Sooraj, Vikram, Mohit's sister; Aryan's adoptive sister; Dilip's ex-wife (2011–2016)
- Satyam Seth as Dilip: Chhavi's ex-husband (2012–2015)
- Randeep Rai / Kunal Khosla as Aryan "Chotu" Rathi: Santosh and Arun's adopted son; Sooraj, Vikram, Mohit and Chhavi's adopted brother; Arzoo's husband (2015–2016)
  - Aryan Sharma as Teenage Aryan "Chotu" Rathi (2011–2015)
- Prachi Tehlan as Arzoo Rathi: Aryan's wife (2016)
- Rakesh Kukreti as Arvind Kothari: Kanchan's husband; Ankur and Sandhya's father; Bulbul, Ved, Vansh and Kanak's grandfather (2011)
- Surbhi Tiwari as Kanchan Kothari: Arvind's wife; Ankur and Sandhya's mother; Bulbul, Ved, Vansh and Kanak's grandmother (2011)
- Varun Khandelwal as Ankur Kothari: Kanchan and Arvind's son; Sandhya's brother; Ankita's husband; Bulbul's father; Vansh's foster father (2011–2016)
- Urmila Nimbalkar / Shubha Uplopwar as Ankita Kothari: Ankur's wife; Bulbul's mother; Vansh's foster mother (2011–2016) (Dead)
- Shivshakti Sachdev as Bulbul Kothari: Ankur and Ankita's daughter (2015)
  - Lavneet Rajput as Child Bulbul Kothari (2014–2015)
- Pubali Sanyal as Angela D'Souza: David's wife; Emily and Mark's mother; Pari's grandmother (2013–2015)
- Lavin Gothi as Mark D'Souza: David and Angela's son; Emily's brother (2013)
- Rashmi Pitre as Chaturi: Rathi family's former household help, Bholaram's wife (2011–2014; 2016)
- Urmila Sharma as Daisaa: Rathi's neighbour and Santosh friend; Kanha's grandmother (2011–2016)
- Kanishka Soni as Kavita: Kanha's mother (2011–2016)
- Ruchi Savarn as Preeti: Sandhya's friend (2011)
- Nupur Alankar as Kisna: Sooraj and Sandhya's matchmaker (2011)
- Helly Shah as Shruti: Chhavi's friend (2011)
- Kiran Bhargava as Malti Agarwal: Owner of the night college where Sandhya studied (2012)
- Gulfam Khan as Uma: Meenakshi and Sudha's mother; Mishri and Golu's grandmother (2011–2012)
- Lahiru Dilshan Dharmasena as Sri lankan chef : Sooraj's friend at worlds best cook competition in Singappore (2012)
- Sneha Verma as Sudha: Uma's daughter; Meenakshi's sister (2012–2014)
- Gaurav Sharma as Rajkumar: Maya's brother; A terrorist (2012, 2014)
- Pallavi Rao as Kajri (2013)
- Eijaz Khan as Abhimanyu Singh (2013)
- Abhijeet Sooryvanshe as Ashutosh Aggrawal: Sandhya's contestant (2013)
- Preeti Chaudhary as Kavita Sharma: Sooraj ex-fiancé, former politician (2013–2014)
- Charu Asopa as Roma Reddy: Sandhya's former friend, Rahul's ex-girlfriend, Terrorist (2014) (Dead)
- Alan Kapoor as IPS Rahul Kapoor: Sandhya's friend, Roma's ex-boyfriend (2014)
- Keith Sequeira as Officer Roy (2014)
- Vindhya Tiwari as Prema: Terrorist (2014) (Dead)
- Jyoti Sharma as Disha: Terrorist (2014)
- Gurdeep Kohli as Maya / Baijii: Rajkumar's sister; The terrorist leader who hijacks the plane (2014)
- Arjun Punj as IPS Arjun Chaudhary (2014)
- Sonam Lamba as Shalu: One of the passengers in the hijacked plane (2014)
- Manini Mishra as Officer Agrima Singh: Sandhya's former mentor (2014–15)
- Neil Bhatt as IPS Zakir Siddiqui: Sandhya and Sooraj's best friend.(2014–2015)
- Jiten Lalwani as National Investigation Bureau officer Bharat Kapoor (2015)
- Rituraj Singh as Mahendra Singh: Kabaddi Coach of Sooraj and his team (2015)
- Ridhi Dogra as Kabaddi Coach Aditi: Sooraj's teacher (2015)
- Jignesh Mehta as Avinash: One of the players in Sooraj's kabaddi team (2015)
- Vicky Arora as Ratan: One of the players in Sooraj's kabaddi team (2015)
- Banty Chopra as Lakhan: One of the players in Sooraj's kabaddi team (2015)
- Sandeep Nahar as Babban: One of the players in Sooraj's kabaddi team (2015)
- Arun Singh Rana as Prem: Sooraj's kabaddi team captain (2015)
- Aadesh Chaudhary as Chandrashekhar: Leader of terrorist group Garjana Sangh (Chandu) (2015)
- Bharat Singh Jadon as Ashok (2015–2016)
- Amit Dolawat as Himanshu Dubey: Manjari's son (2015)
- Ekta Tiwari as Devi Narayani (2015)
- Vaishali Thakkar as Manjari: Himanshu's mother (2015)
- Shalini Arora as Yashoda (2015)
- Shefali Sharma as Laalima Agarwal: Lokesh's sister; Sooraj's ex-fiancé; Pramod's wife (2015–2016)
- Akshay Batchu as Lokesh Agarwal: Laalima's brother (2015–2016)
- Sarwar Ahuja as IPS Satyadev Tripathi: Head investigator of Mohit's murder case (2015–2016)
- Joyoshree Arora as Resham: Arzoo's grandmother (2016)
- Rukhsar Rehman as Mehak (2016)
- Deepraj Rana as Gul Mohammad (2016)
- Anshul Trivedi as Amit (2016)
- Vishal Jethwa as Chhota Packet: The leader of the terrorist group who subjugate Hanuman street (2016)
- Rishina Kandhari as Arpita Khanna: Sandhya's co-officer (2016)
- Akhil Kataria as PP (2016)
- Ashish Chaudhary as Jimmy (2016)

=== Guest stars ===
- Hina Khan as Akshara Singhania from Yeh Rishta Kya Kehlata Hai (2012; 2015).
- Ashnoor Kaur as Naira Singhania from Yeh Rishta Kya Kehlata Hai (2015)
- Devoleena Bhattacharjee for Dance Performance: as Gopi Modi from Saath Nibhaana Saathiya (2016)
- Gurmeet Choudhary and Debina Bonnerjee for Dance Performance during Holi (2016)
- Ragini Khanna as herself (2014)
- Aamir Khan to promote his show Satyamev Jayate (2012)
- Salman Khan and Sonakshi Sinha to promote their film Dabangg 2 (2012)
- Shahrukh Khan as Quizmaster to promote Chennai Express (2013)

== Production ==
=== Development ===
20 years back I read a story in a newspaper that talked about a common man – a panipuri seller helping his wife become a civil servant. I just based my show Diya Aur Baati Hum on this incident, which was still afresh in my memory.

— Sumeet Mittal during January 2012

Speaking about the series before its premiere, Nitin Vaidya, the Business Head of StarPlus then said, "It's undeniable that in India, traditionally the women's role is seen as bride, wife or mother, within the geographical parameters of her home. This show aims at breaking that mold and raising public acceptance of women stepping out of their homes towards self-fulfillment. Diya Aur Bati Hum is another testimony of Star Plus' programming ethos – 'Rishta Wahi, Soch Nayi (Same relationship, different thinking)'."

On 8 January 2013, the cast and crew went to Ajmer to shoot a sequence, expected to return to Mumbai on 11 January 2013. However, with the overcrowding of the fans of the series, they could not properly shoot within the estimated time, sometimes halting owing to the rush of people there.

In December 2014, the shoot was disrupted when an air cooler in the sets burst, injuring two technicians. In the same month, it was announced that Bollywood singers Javed Ali and Shilpa Rao would record a song for an upcoming sequence.

In September 2015, for the track of Mission Mahabali, six sets of each dress were made for the cast during the outdoor shoot owing unpredictable weather change and rains.

=== Casting ===
Gautam Gulati quit the series in September 2014 for participating in Bigg Boss 8 and was replaced by Karan Goddwani as Vikram. In December 2014, Neelu Vaghela playing Santosh decided quit the series owing health issues and her death sequence was also shot. But the popular demand from both viewers and channel made her to continue and the track was altered. In the same month, Shubha Uplopwar replaced Urmila Nimbalkar as Ankita.

In May 2015, Jimmy Shergill was in talks for the role of the Kabaddi coach. But, Shahbaz Khan was confirmed. However, Rituraj Singh got the role due to the creative differences with Khan. In April 2015, Randeep Rai, who was cast for the role Adult Chotu, quit the series in few months and was replaced by Kunal Khosla in January 2016. In November 2015, Varun Jain playing Mohit wished to opt out of the series unhappy with his role shaping up and thus his character was killed in the series.

=== Cancellation and future ===
Due to its fluctuating ratings, it was reported to go off air on 15 August 2016. But, it received an extension for about a month and ended on 10 September 2016. However, before the series was about to end, it was reported to come back with a sequel series owing its popularity. Within seven months, the sequel titled as Tu Sooraj Main Saanjh, Piyaji premiered and aired from 3 April 2017 to 1 June 2018 for 365 episodes.

=== Filming ===
The series is based on the backdrop of Pushkar, Rajasthan. The series is mainly filmed on the sets created in Mira road, Mumbai. Some of the scenes were filmed in Rajasthan including Pushkar, Ajmer and Bikaner. The final scene of the series was filmed in Udaipur. In June 2012, the sequence of lead character Sooraj's cooking competition was filmed in Singapore for 10 days. For that, the upcoming episodes were shot well in advance before going there such that shooting did not happen for 12 days after it in India.

From December 2013 for a few months, the main IPS training sequence of lead character Sandhya was shot at Haryana Police Commando Complex in Newal, Karnal and the initial promo of the sequence being shot in a ground at Matunga. During which, in April 2014 the sequence of a training in Jungle was shot at Ghodbunder road, Thane, Maharashtra.

In March 2015, the storyline took a five years leap. Soon, in the same year, in July, it took a three years leap.

In 2016, the sequences of the character Arzoo in Pakistan was shot at Bhopal which was shown in the series as Pakistan.

Singh and Rashid continuously ran for about 12 hours for filming the last sequence for 2 days.

=== Crossover ===
On 24 August 2012, the show had a crossover episode with Yeh Rishta Kya Kehlata Hai. On 3 March 2016, Diya Aur Baati Hum's lead actress Deepika Singh as Sandhya made an entry in Yeh Rishta Kya Kehlata Hai. In January 2016, Diya Aur Baati Hum and Saath Nibhana Saathiya had a connection where Devoleena Bhattacharjee as Gopi from Saathiya entered the series.

== Reception ==
=== Critics ===
Rediff.com quoted the series as simple and fresh.

Hindustan Times quoted that the series portrayed women in better light.

The Indian Express rated two and a half stars and stated, "The lead actors are impressive. Anas Rashid as maa ka laadla (mother's favorite) Sooraj is likable and Deepika Singh as Sandhya is raw but earnest."

=== India ===
Diya Aur Baati Hum maintained its number one position mostly on the ratings charts from the beginning till it completed 1000 episodes. It became the no 1 show in India with 14.5 TVM (Television Viewership in Millions), considered to be extremely good at that time. It also became the only fiction show to have a rating of 6.6 on a Saturday. Diya Aur Baati Hum is also known as one of the most popular Indian teledrama for Star Plus.

The series opened with a low rating of 1.9 TVR in its debut week, but soon increased and entered top ten Hindi GECs. In week 33 of 2011, it garnered 3.81 TVR being seventh most watched Hindi GEC while the following week, it was the tenth most watched Hindi GEC with 3.11 TVR. In week 42, it was at tenth position garnering 3.65 TVR. In week 50 and 51, it became the second most watched Hindi GEC after Saath Nibhana Saathiya garnering 5.7 and 5.87 TVR.

In first week of 2012, it garnered 5.98 TVR. On week ending 21 January 2012, it garnered 5.88 TVR being most watched Hindi GEC. In week ending 2 May 2012 and the following week it maintained its top position with 5 and 4.7 TVR. In May 2012, during the ongoing IPL broadcast during prime time remained the most watched television program. After three weeks of its premiere being most watched programme, in Week 17 2012, Dance India Dance along with Diya Aur Baati Hum beat them scoring 4.5 and 4.48 TVR for position number one and two being the only two GECs to top the list. In week 22 during IPL finale, it was the most watched Hindi GEC with 5.1 TVR. During 15 to 21 July 2012 and previous week, it maintained its top position with 5.8 and 5.9 TVR. During 1 to 15 August 2012, it maintained its top position with 5.8 TVR. In week 51, it was at second position with 4.8 TVR. In the year, the track of Sooraj's international cooking competition topped the Hindi GEC ratings list while the following track of terrorist Rajkumar reached a 6.9 TVR.

In week 5 of 2013, it was the most watched Hindi GEC with 4.3 TVR while it was pushed to second by Sapne Suhane Ladakpan Ke garnering 4.2 TVR. In week 9, it was in the top spot with 7.1 TVR. The following week it maintained its position with 5.7 TVR. In week 16 and 17 it maintained its top position with 3.7 and 4 TVR. In week 23, it once again was at the top with a trp of 3.7. In first week of August, it was the top rated with 4.5 TVR. During week 30 and 31 of 2013, it maintained its top position garnering 9.1 and 10.3 million viewership. In week 48 of 2013 it was the most watched Hindi GEC with 11.4 million TVTs. Overall, It secured number one among the top ten shows in India of 2013, with an average viewership of 9.3 million and a peak viewership of 12.3 million in October 2013. In week 47, it remained the top rated with more than about 12 million impressions.

In first week of 2014, it was at the top position with 6 TVR. In week 3, it maintained its position with 6.4 TVR. In week 5 also it was at top with 5.7 TVR. The series had a tough fight with Kumkum Bhagya for the top spot which aired at the rival channel Zee TV during same time slot after it premiered in April 2014. When Kumkum Bhagya premiered, Diya Aur Baati Hum, the top show in its time slot saw a decrease of 22% of its viewership in that week, after which Kumkum's viewership started increasing gradually and soon beat Diya Aur Baati Hum for number one pushing it to second. Since then, both had a tough fight for number one position for a long time alternatively. In week 27 of 2014, it shared the top spot with Saath Nibhana Saathiya garnering 4.4 TVR. In week ending 23 August 2014, it had 7.3 million viewership occupying fourth position while the previous week it was at top position with 7.6 million. In third week of September 2014, it was at top with 3.8 TVR. In second week of November 2014, it maintained its top position with 5.5 TVR. In week 52, it continued to maintain its top position. Overall, In 2014, it maintained its position in top three most watched Hindi shows.

In January 2015, it remained the most watched Hindi show followed by Kumkum Bhagya. However, after the five years leap during February 2015, ratings started to decline losing its top position. First two weeks of May 2015, it dropped to tenth position garnering 4 and 4.1 TVR. In week 40 of 2015, it was at top position with 4.31 TVR. In week 42 of 2015, Diya Aur Baati Hum was at fourth position with a TRP of 3.

In week 11 of 2016, it garnered a trp of 2.3 while the following week, it occupied seventh position garnering a trp of 2.6. In week 14, it garnered a trp of 2 slipping down to seventh position. In first week of June 2016, it garnered 1.6 trp moving out of top ten. However, it was ended by the channel in September 2016 due to its declining ratings in recent months.

=== UK ===
In the UK, Diya Aur Baati Hum was consistently one of the most watched Indian television shows, with more than 200,000 viewrs. It garnered its first peak rating of 315.100 K viewership in October 2013 and got a record viewership of 383,700 viewers in April 2014.

=== Impact ===
The story is based on a fictional family in Pushkar of Rajasthan who lives in the fictional street named Hanuman Gali. Owing to Diya Aur Baati Hum's huge popularity, Municipal Corporation and Government of Rajasthan renamed a lane in Pushkar as Hanuman Gali. The event was attended by the cast and crew which was held during December 2015. Speaking about it actress Neelu Vaghela who played Santosh said, "Apparently, the show has a great viewership and tourists who visited Pushkar often used to go searching for Hanuman Galli and ask for Sooraj and his jalebi shop. Since this has led to increasing in tourists, I guess the ministry must have come up with this plan. We are excited and the whole team will be going for this event." Lead Deepika Singh stated, "There was a day when I had to run through all the streets in Pushkar for the opening scene of the show. Nobody did recognize me then. But now, as I stood at the same place, the whole crowd present over there was cheering for me and their reactions made me feel so special,"

The poster of the series and the main leads are found in the shops in the areas of Pushkar and Jaipur owing its popularity.

== Broadcast ==
It was dubbed in Telugu on Star MAA as "Eetharam Illalu". In the Tamil it was dubbed under the title, "En Kanavan En Thozhan" on Star Vijay and in Kannada as "Radhe Shyama" on Star Suvarna.

== Adaptations ==
Language	Title	Original release	Network(s)	Last aired	Notes
Bengali	Tomay Amay Mile তোমায় আমায় মিলে	11 March 2013	Star Jalsha	20 March 2016	Remake
Malayalam	Parasparam പരസ്പരം	22 July 2013	Asianet	31 August 2018	Remake
Marathi	Phulala Sugandha Maticha फुलाला सुगंध मातीचा	2 September 2020	Star Pravah	4 December 2022	Remake
Tamil	Raja Rani 2 ராஜா ராணி 2	12 October 2020	Star Vijay	21 March 2023	Remake
Telugu	Janaki Kalaganaledu జానకి కలగలేదు	22 March 2021	Star Maa	19 August 2023	Remake
Kannada	Radhe Shyama ರಾಧೆ ಶ್ಯಾಮ	6 September 2021	Star Suvarna	16 April 2022	Remake

== Sequel series ==
Owing its popularity, the creators of the show launched a sequel series named Tu Sooraj Main Saanjh, Piyaji with the leads Anas Rashid and Deepika Singh not being part of it. It starred Rhea Sharma as Kanak, the grown up daughter of Sooraj and Sandhya and Avinesh Rekhi as Uma Shankar. It began airing from 3 April 2017 and ended on 1 June 2018 completing 365 episodes.

== Awards and nominations ==
Zee Gold Awards
Year	Category	Recipient	Result
2012	Best Actress In A Supporting Role(Critics)	Neelu Vaghela	Won
2012	Best Actress In A Negative Role(Popular)	Kanika Maheshwari	Won
2012	Gold Debut In A Lead Role(Female)	Deepika Singh	Won
2012	Best Television Show(Fiction)	Diya Aur Baati Hum	Won
2012	Best Actor In A Lead Role(Male)	Anas Rashid	Nominated
2012	Best Actor In A Supporting Role(Popular)	Ashok Lokhande	Nominated
2012	Best Actress In A Supporting Role(Popular)	Neelu Vaghela	Nominated
2012	Best Actor In A Negative Role(Popular)	Gautam Gulati	Nominated
2012	Best Celebrity Jodi	Anas Rashid & Deepika Singh	Nominated
2012	Best TV Show For A Social Change	Diya Aur Baati Hum	Nominated
2013	Best Actress (Popular)	Deepika Singh	Won
2013	Best Supporting Actress (Popular)	Neelu Vaghela	Won
2013	Best Negative Actress (Popular)	Kanika Maheshwari	Won
2013	Best TV Show (Fiction)	Shashi Sumeet Productions	Won
2013	Best Comic Actor (Popular)	Gautam Gulati	Nominated
2013	Best Supporting Actor (Popular)	Ashok Lokhande	Nominated
2013	Best Actor Male	Anas Rashid	Nominated
2014	Best Actress (Popular)	Deepika Singh	Won
2014	Best Supporting Actress (Popular)	Neelu Vaghela	Won
2014	Best TV Show (Fiction)	Shashi Sumeet Productions	Won
2014	Best Negative Actor (Popular)	Gautam Gulati	Nominated
2014	Best Actor (Male)	Anas Rashid	Nominated
2014	Best Supporting Actor (Popular)	Ashok Lokhande	Nominated
2014	Best Celebrity Jodi	Anas Rashid & Deepika Singh	Nominated
2015	Best Actor (Female)	Deepika Singh	Nominated
2015	Best Actor (Male)	Anas Rashid	Nominated
2015	Best Supporting Actor (Female)	Neelu Vaghela	Nominated
2015	Best Television Show (Fiction)	Shashi Sumeet Productions	Nominated
2016	Best Actress	Deepika Singh	Nominated
2016	Best Supporting Actor (Male)	Ashok Lokhande	Nominated
2016	Best Supporting Actor (Female)	Neelu Vaghela	Nominated
Indian Telly Awards
Year	Category	Recipient	Result
2012	Best Title Singer for a TV Show	Shubha Mudgal & Kailash Kher	Won
2012	Best Daily Serial	Shashi Sumeet Productions	Won
2012	Best Actress in a Negative Role	Kanika Maheshwari	Won
2012	Best Makeup Artist	Krishna Gopal Rajput	Nominated
2012	Best Programme with a Social Message	Shashi Sumeet Productions	Nominated
2012	Best Fresh New Face (Female)	Deepika Singh	Nominated
2012	Best Child Actor	Aryan Sharma	Nominated
2012	Best Actress in a Supporting Role	Neelu Vaghela	Nominated
2012	Best Actor in a Lead Role	Anas Rashid	Nominated
2012	Best Onscreen Couple	Anas Rashid & Deepika Singh	Nominated
2013	Best Actress in a Lead Role	Deepika Singh	Won
2013	Best Actor in a Lead Role	Anas Rashid	Won
2013	Best Actress in a Supporting Role (Jury)	Neelu Vaghela	Won
2013	Best Daily Serial	Shashi Sumeet Productions	Won
2013	Best Makeup Artist	Krishna Gopal Rajput	Won
2013	Best Actress in a Supporting Role (Popular)	Neelu Vaghela	Nominated
2013	Best Actress in a Comic Role (Popular)	Kanika Maheshwari	Nominated
2013	Best Actress in a Comic Role (Jury)	Kanika Maheshwari	Nominated
2013	Best Actress in a Negative Role	Kanika Maheshwari	Nominated
2013	Best Drama Series	Shashi Sumeet Productions	Nominated
2013	Best Onscreen Couple	Anas Rashid & Deepika Singh	Nominated
2013	Best Programme with a Social Message	Shashi Sumeet Productions	Nominated
2013	Indian Telly Award for Best Ensemble	Shashi Sumeet Productions	Nominated
2013	Indian Telly Jury Award for Best Story Writer	Shashi Mittal & Seema Mantri	Nominated
2014	Best Daily Serial	Shashi Sumeet Productions	Won
2014	Best Actress in a Lead Role	Deepika Singh	Nominated
2014	Best Actor in a Lead Role	Anas Rashid	Nominated
2014	Indian Telly Award for Best Actress in a Supporting Role (Drama)	Neelu Vaghela	Nominated
2014	Indian Telly Award for Best Actor in a Supporting Role (Comedy)	Gautam Gulati	Nominated
2014	Indian Telly Award for Best Actress in a Supporting Role (Comedy)	Kanika Maheshwari	Nominated
2015	Best Actress in a Lead Role	Deepika Singh	Nominated
2015	Best Actor in a Lead Role	Anas Rashid	Nominated
2015	Best Actress in a Supporting Role (Jury)	Neelu Vaghela	Nominated
2015	Best Onscreen Couple	Anas Rashid & Deepika Singh	Nominated
2015	Best Programme with a Social Message	Shashi Sumeet Productions	Nominated
2015	Best Daily Serial	Shashi Sumeet Productions	Nominated
Indian Television Academy Awards
Year	Category	Recipient	Result
2012	Best Singer	Shubha Mudgal & Kailash Kher	Won
2012	Best Serial (Popular)	Shashi Sumeet Productions	Won
2012	Best Actor (Jury)	Anas Rashid	Nominated
2012	Best Title Song	Adil	Nominated
2013	Best Actor (Drama)	Anas Rashid	Won
2013	Best Supporting Actress	Neelu Vaghela	Won
2013	Best Dialogues	Raghuvir Shekhawat	Won
2013	Best Teleplay	Seema Mantri	Won
2013	Best Director (Drama)	Rohit Raj Goyal	Won
2014	Best Actress (Popular)	Deepika Singh	Won
2014	Best Supporting Actress	Neelu Vaghela	Won
2014	Best Serial	Shashi Sumeet Productions	Won
2014	Best Drama Actress	Deepika Singh	Nominated
2014	Best Drama Actor	Anas Rashid	Nominated
2014	Desh Ka Sitara – Best Actor (Popular)	Anas Rashid	Nominated
2014	Best Serial	Shashi Sumeet Productions	Nominated
2014	Best Dialogues	Raghuvir Shekhawat	Nominated
2016	Best Actress	Deepika Singh	Nominated
2016	Best Serial	Shashi Sumeet Productions	Nominated

Big Star Entertainment Awards
Year	Category	Recipient	Result
2013	Best TV Show	Diya Aur Baati Hum	Won
2014	Best TV Show	Diya Aur Baati Hum	Won

Awarded by UP Government
Category	Recipient	Result
Achievement in Acting Profession	Anas Rashid	Won

Gold Awards 2016
Year	Category	Recipient	Result
2016	Best Actress in Comedy Role	Kanika Maheswari	Won
