= Jai Jai Jai Bajrang Bali =

Indian mythological television series

- Logo image
- Genre: Mythological; Drama
- Written by: Udipto Sahgal
- Story by: Prem Sagar
- Directed by: Ajay Kumar
- Starring: See below
- Theme music composer: Pandit Kiran Mishra & Surya Raj Kamal
- Opening theme: "Jai Jai Jai Bajrang Bali" by Mohammad Aziz
- Country of origin: India
- Original language: Hindi
- No. of seasons: 1
- No. of episodes: 1500

Production
- Executive producer: Shiv Sagar
- Producer: Anand Sagar
- Cinematography: S Kumar
- Editor: Shums Mirza
- Camera setup: Multi-camera
- Running time: 24 minutes
- Production company: Sagar Films

Original release
- Network: Sahara One
- Release: 6 June 2011 – 31 July 2015

Jai Jai Jai Bajrang Bali (transl. Victory to the mighty Hanuman) is an Indian Hindu religious television series, which premiered on 6 June 2011 on Sahara One. It is based on the life of Hanuman, the Hindu vanara deity who plays a major role in the epic Ramayana. The show tells the story of Hanuman (Maruti) as he grows up in Kishkindha along with his mother Anjana and father Kesari.

The storyline of the series focuses on Hanuman as the avatar of Shiva. The events depicted are some of the lesser-known ones surrounding the trials and tribulations of Hanuman, while he was combating the evil and malevolent forces espoused by characters such as Raavana. Through the course of the show, the makers of the series plan to reveal the miraculous powers and the immeasurable physical strength Hanuman derives from Shiva, which ultimately helps him pursue his noble endeavors and win his fights against all evil forces he encounters.

== Plot ==
=== Panchamuki Anjaneya Swami Temple; Karnataka ===
Hanuman proves Varun wrong when Dhartidhol Prasad comes with an answer and at same time Arun shouts the answer. Pradhan Jaipal announces the last competition of Mallayudh that should be started. The first Mallayudh happens between Dhartidhol Prasad and Sanjay followed by Mukesh competing with Arun and then between Varun and Vikram. The competitions for the Swayamvar ends up with Varun scoring the highest points and winning the competitions. But suddenly Sanchita stands up with a question for contestants and then to decide the winner. Arun gives right answer and wins the Swayamvar. Sanchita happily accepts Arun as his husband.

Arun gives the right answer and wins the Swayamvar. Sanchita happily accepts Arun as his husband. Losing the Swayamvar, Varun gets upset and angry. He goes to Mahanand to help him out to get Sanchita. Tantrik Mahanand asks hundred gold coins from Varun. Arun and Sanchita are getting married whereas Varun comes home to get some gold coins for tantrik Mahanand. Sanchita asks Hanuman to get her conch from Kishkinda for worshipping Lord Shiva. After the marriage, Arun and Sanchita head towards their home and Hanuman leaves for Kishkinda. Mahanand is happy to see gold brought by Varun. Village ladies welcome Sanchita to Arun's house and get tensed about Varun.

King Kesari and mata Anjana discuss about whether Hanuman will stay in Kishkinda or will return to Sumeru. On first night, Sanchita gives gift to Arun. But Arun is not able to find his gift which he has bought for Sanchita. Varun gives fruits as a gift to Arun and Sanchita. On his way to Kishkinda, Hanuman encounters with Pakshiraj Sampati (king of birds). He explains Hanuman the entire incidence that how he lost his wings for protecting his younger brother Jatayu. Hanuman advises him to worship Lord Ram to get rid of his sins. Arun feels uneasy after eating the fruit given by Varun and he goes out of the hut. Hanuman along with Jamvant comes to Rajdarbar to meet Bali and Sugreev.

Hanuman along with Jamvant comes to Rajdarbar to meet Bali and Sugreev and discuss about the words given by the king Kunjar. Sanchita is worried for Arun and requests Varun to find her husband. In Kishkinda Darbaar, a soldier comes and informs everyone that they are being attacked by a monster. Hearing this Bali gets angry and leaves. Varun comes to Mahanand in anger and tells him that the fruit he gave is not effective. Sanchita gets upset and Varun tries to provoke her against Arun. He says Arun is a coward and should forget him. Hanuman gets the conch from Kinshkinda and heads towards Arun's house. Sanchita gets flashes in which Varun takes Arun's place. She gets confused and goes in search of Arun. Hanuman is shocked to see Varun running in the forest.

Varun runs in the forest in search of Sanchita when Hanuman sees him and follows. Varun is shocked and cries out loud when he sees Sanchita and Arun both turned into a tree. Hanuman reaches there and after seeing the situation gets confused. Varun tells him a fake story and they go to tantrik Mahanand for the solution. Arun and Sanchita are upset and worried about their freedom.

Varun tells Hanuman a fake story of Sanchita and they go to tantrik Mahanand for the solution. Arun and Sanchita are upset and worried about their freedom. According to tantrik Mahanand; Arun and Sanchita are under a curse and evil has come upon them in some way. Hanuman goes in search of Maharshi Sadanand and Varun comes back to Sanchita and waits near the tree. Sanchita gets confused between Varuna and Arun as who is her husband. But finally Arun realizes that Varun is the only person who has fed them a magical fruit. Varun realizes his mistake and in anger he goes to meet tantrik Mahanand. But once again Varun comes under the spell of Mahanand's black magic and follows his all instruction. Hanuman along with Maharshi Sadanand; comes to meet Mahanand. Maharshi feels betrayed when he sees Mahanand and gets angry on Hanuman.

== Cast ==
- Raj Mange as Child Hanuman
- Aparna Tarakad as Anjana
- Romanch Mehta as Suryadev
- Abhijeet Sooryvanshe as Vrihaspati
- Shobhit Attray as Rama
- Shweta Kanoje as Kaushalya
- Sonali Gupta as Sita
- Raman Khatri as Vibhishana
- Nimai Bali as Ravana
- Amardeep Garg as Kagmundi Rakshasa
- Zeba Hussain as Saraswati
- Shivam Jagtap as young Yamraj

== Contemporary locations ==
The epic series looks to create greater resonance with sections of the audience with lesser mythological know-how, with the inclusion of places that are directly linked to or mentioned in the Ramayana and other relevant mythological texts, as shooting locations for the show. Most of these places are popular as tourist destinations in contemporary knowledge and culture.

The Anjanadri Hill near Hampi, believed to be the birthplace of Lord Hanuman, is one such location featured in the series. Others include Kishkinda, now known as Hammipur and Belur, as well as Anganwadi in the ancient city of Varanasi, which is described extensively in Tulsi Das’ Ramayana. Varanasi, in fact, is where Tulsi Das lived when he wrote a major part of the Ram Charit Manas. Kishkinda, on the other hand, has strong references in the Ramayana as the ape kingdom that was ruled by Sugriva's brother, Bali. Hanuman helps Sugriva capture the kingdom, and later brings him and Lord Rama together for the war against Raavana.

== In the media ==
The series, though well received, and hugely popular amongst millions of cable TV subscribers, has received some amount of criticism for the quality of production. "While Hanuman has been (a) part of our lives since the days of Doordarshan and the late Ramanand Sagar's Ramayan, it's also taken animated forms in endearing children's films. So it's painful to sit through this tacky production. Raavana's sword is a cardboard toy, while the torture scenes of the rishi-munis are funny, to say the least. Everyone goes through their jobs seriously, but are let down by shoddy production values", says an Indian Express reviewer.

Jai Jai Jai Bajarang Bali has been in the news for being the top-rated show in spot ad charges on Sahara One. The prime time feature is all set to generate the highest revenues for the cable TV channel, after it decided to adopt the fixed spot strategy as of March 2012. In a bid to increase its advertising revenues by 30% within one year, Sahara One designated Jai Jai Jai Bajarangbali as its flagship property and fixed ad rates during the show at an estimated Rs.7,500 for a 10-second spot.
