= Neelu Vaghela =

Indian television actress

- Born: 15 April 1970 (age 56); Jaipur, Rajasthan, India
- Occupations: Actress, Dancer, TV presenter
- Years active: 1981–present
- Known for: Diya Aur Baati Hum; Tu Sooraj Main Saanjh, Piyaji
- Spouse: Arvind Kumar
- Children: 2

Neelu Vaghela (born 15 April 1970) is an Indian actress, dancer and television personality, well known for her work in the Rajasthani cinema. She is also known for the role of Santosh Arun Rathi aka Bhabho in the soap opera Diya Aur Baati Hum and its sequel Tu Sooraj Main Saanjh, Piyaji on Star Plus. She has her own production house, Aruneel Films, which makes Rajasthani movies.

== Early life and career ==
Neelu Vaghela started her career as a stage artist and was chosen for films. She appeared in Supattar Binani in 1981 at the age of 11 and acted in Bai Chali Sasariya which was remade in Hindi as Saajan Ka Ghar. She spent her earlier phase of life in Jaipur.

She has also appeared in films like Ramgarh Ri Ramli, Jai Karni Mata, Naini Bai Ro Mayro, Lancha Gujri, Derani Jethani, Ramkudi Ghamkudi, Baisa Ra Jatan Karo, Dadosari Laadli, Veer Tejaji and Bai Chali Sasariye.

Vaghela became a household name after portraying Santosh Arun Rathi aka Bhabho on popular Star Plus soap Diya Aur Baati Hum. She then went on to participate in the dance reality show Nach Baliye 5 with her husband Arvind Kumar. On 23 March 2013, Vaghela and her husband finished in third place on the fifth season of Nach Baliye.

She is married to Arvind Kumar, and has two children: a son, Kaizer, and a daughter, Vanshikha. There are rumours of her being separated from her husband, as she has unfollowed him from social media accounts and also removed 'Vaghela' surname.

== Filmography ==
=== Film ===
- Ramgarh Ri Ramli
- Jai Karni Mata
- Naini Bai Ro Mayro as Naini Bai
- Baba ji ka tullu
- Derani Jethani
- Dharambhai (with Naresh Kanodia and Arvindkumar)
- Ramkudi Ghamkudi as Ramkudi Ghamkudi
- Binani
- Baisa Ra Jatan Karo
- Dadosari Laadli
- Veer Tejaji
- Bai Chali Sasariye
- Nanad Bhojai
- Supattar Binani
- Lado Tharo Gaon Bado Pyaro
- Binani
- Jaatni
- Baba Ramdev

=== Television ===
Year	Serial	Role	Language	Notes
2011–2016	Diya Aur Baati Hum	Santosh Arun Rathi aka Bhabho	Hindi	
2012–2013	Nach Baliye 5	Contestant	Hindi	With husband Arvind Kumar
2013	Meri Maa	Host	Hindi	
2017–2018	Tu Sooraj Main Saanjh, Piyaji	Santosh Arun Rathi aka Bhabho	Hindi	
2018–2019	Main Maike Chali Jaungi Tum Dekhte Rahiyo	Satya Amarnath Sharma / Satya Vikramjeet Singh	Hindi	
2020	Shaadi Mubarak	Bua	Hindi	
2020–2021	Aye Mere Humsafar	Pratibha Kothari	Hindi	
2021–2022	Pavitra: Bharose Ka Safar	Uma Thakur	Hindi	
2022–2023	Bindiya Sarkar	Barfi Kantilal Bharadwaj	Hindi	
2023	Laal Banarasi		Hindi	
2024	Mera Balam Thanedaar	Bhavani Chundawat	Hindi	
2024	Suhaagan	Shanti Shukla	Hindi	
2024	Dhruv Tara – Samay Sadi Se Pare	Rajrani	Hindi	
2024	Saajha Sindoor	Hukum	Hindi	
2024–2025	Shyam Dhun Laagi Re	Mrs. Mehta	Gujarati	
2024–2025	Main Dil Tum Dhadakan		Hindi	
2025	Vasudha	Mrs. Mehta	Hindi	
2025	Mangal Lakshmi	Bhabhiji	Hindi	
2026	Pati Anaadi	Jashodha	Hindi	
2026–present	Yeh Rishta Kya Kehlata Hai	Bhairavi Devi Damani	Hindi	
