= Ruby Duby Hub Dub =

Indian children's television series

Ruby Duby Hub Dub is an Indian kids series aired on Sahara One channel in 2004. Produced by Dheeraj Kumar of Creative Eye Limited, the series originally premiered on 27 March 2004.

== Plot ==
Deepak Malhotra (Parmeet Sethi) is a widower from Pune, living with his three children - Chinky, Vishu, and Gochu. He learns of the demise of his elder brother and sister in-law in a car accident, and shifts base to Mumbai, in order to look after his brother's children - Kittu and Pinky. He also takes over at Zara Hatke, the ad agency and film production house of his brother. Kittu and Pinky don't really like their uncle and their cousins living with them, and constantly devise plans to get rid of them. Even Deepak's children reciprocate, by playing tricks to give it back to their cousins. They eventually make peace. The story revolves around the children and their daily lives, which sometimes develop into comic situations.

== Cast ==
- Parmeet Sethi as Deepak Malhotra
- Eva Grover as Nikki, Deepak's junior at Zara Hatke, his brother's ad agency.
- Mushtaq Sheikh as Swami, another executive junior to Deepak.
- Shekhar Shukla as Maganlal "Maggi", the butler of the Malhotras, who has been deported from the US post-9/11.
- Akshita Kapoor as Pinky Malhotra, a 13-year-old fashionista and Deepak's niece.
- Rudraksh Thakur as Kittu Malhotra, Deepak's 12-year-old nephew, who's a fan of horror stories and ghosts. He has a pet skeleton homonymic to his cousin Vishu.
- Esha as Chinky Malhotra, Deepak's 11-year-old daughter, who aspires to be a boxer, and loves to show off her talent of boxing.
- Abhileen Pandey as Vishu Malhotra, Deepak's 9-year-old son, who is a nerd, and his catchphrase is "Mere paas ek question hai.." (I have a question), and occasionally performs bad at school tests.
- Darshil Mashru as Gochu Malhotra, Deepak's 5-year-old kid. He spends most of his day at his "picnic spot", as said by his siblings—the washroom. He is a very innocent boy, and gives in to threats.
- Gaurav Chopra as Ballu (Ghost)
- Kavita Kaushik
- Raashi Bawa
