= Chuni Lal Katial =

Chuni Lal Katial (1898 – 14 November 1978) was a South Asian medical doctor and politician, who became the first UK's South Asian mayor, after being elected mayor of the Metropolitan Borough of Finsbury in 1938. He was born in the Punjab Region in 1898.

== Career ==
Katial came to London in or around 1929, and started his career running a medical practice in Canning Town. During that time, Katial – an acquaintance of Mahatma Gandhi – introduced Gandhi to Charlie Chaplin, at his house in Canning Town on 22 September 1931.

In 1935, Katial came to prominence as Chairman of the Public Health Committee of Finsbury Borough Council, where he was responsible for pushing forward a programme for health and housing known as the Finsbury Plan – an ambitious plan to build a centralised facility that would incorporate a health centre, libraries, public baths and nurseries in the famously working class council. In 1937, as part of this plan, Katial commissioned architect Berthold Lubetkin to build the Finsbury Health Centre. The Centre was renowned both for its architectural style and its new approach to centralised health, housing multiple free medical facilities under one roof, and predating the National Health Service by over 10 years.

Katial was elected mayor of Finsbury for 1938–1939. During the Second World War, he served as a First-Aid Medical Officer. In 1946, he was elected to the London County Council, as one of the two borough representatives. On 8 June 1948, he was granted the Freedom of the Borough of Finsbury.
