= Tarana Raja =

Indian actress, dance, television and radio presenter

- Born: New Delhi, India
- Occupations: Actress; podcaster; writer; television anchor; radio host
- Years active: 1995 onwards

Tarana Raja is an Indian actress, podcaster, writer, television anchor and radio host.

She co-hosted a popular radio show in Mumbai, "Jaggu and Tarana", alongside Ashish Jagtiani (a.k.a. Jaggu). Due to the popularity of the radio program, a television show called COLORS CricQuiz was created.

== Biography ==
Tarana Raja was born in 1977 in Delhi, India. Her mother is actress Madhu Raja.

== Filmography ==
=== Film ===
Year	Title	Role	Notes
2026	Meethe Mein Kya Hai	Preethi	Netflix film
2025	Sitaare Zameen Par	Anupama Mondal	
2012	Jodi Breakers	Isha	
2010	Karthik Calling Karthik	Neelu	
2008	Thoda Pyaar Thoda Magic		
2007	Laaga Chunari Mein Daag (Journey Of A Woman)	Sophia	
2006	Pyaar Ke Side Effects	Shalini	

=== Web Series ===
Year(s)	Title	Role	Notes
2025	Crime beat on Zee5	Sameera Saxena	

=== Television ===
Year(s)	Title	Role	Notes
2011 - 2014	Bade Achhe Lagte Hain	Neha Vikram Shergill	
2011–2012	Dil Dosti Dance	Smriti Ghai	
2009–2012	Face to Face & In Conversation with Tarana (anchor)		
2012	Apsara Awards		
2012	New Talent Awards		
2009–2010	Some Girl(s)	Bobby / Shivani	
2008–2010	Let's Talk		
2008–2009	Kuchh Is Tara	Pooja Godbole	
2009	Zing Expose	Anchor	
2008	Khud Par Karo Yakeen		
2008	Flashback		
2008	Dance India Dance	Anchor	
2007	Kabhi Haan Kabhi Naa	ACP Devika	
2004–2007	DD Top 10		
2006	Zee Cine Awards	Host	
2004–2005	The Great Indian Comedy Show		
2004–2005	Lo Kal-Lo Baat		
2005	Apni Tuning Jamegi		
2004–2005	Recova Superfan – The Hunt for Amitabh Bachchan's biggest fan	Anchor	
2004	Sanjivani	Reena	
2004	Kumkum – Pyara Sa Bandhan	Nalli	
2004	Saathiya	Simran	
2002–2004	Kasautii Zindagi Kay	Vishakha Bajaj	
2001–2004	Chitrahaar		
2004	Star Parivaar Awards	Host	
2002	Kkusum	Sonia Jhulka	
2001–2002	Sanskruti	Surabhi / Tanya Goenka	
2002	Screen Awards		
2000–2002	Music this Week	Anchor	
2000–2002	Chit Chaat	Anchor	
2000–2002	Artist Of The Fortnight		
2000–2002	Dekho Kya Fark Hai		
2000–2002	Old is Gold		
2000	Zee & You		
	Indian Investor of the Year		

== Radio ==
Year	Name	Role	Station
2002–2009	Good Morning Mumbai	Host	Go 92.5 FM
	Radio Talkies		Radio midday
	Good Morning Mumbai		Go 92.5 FM
	Flashback		Go 92.5 FM
2013–2016	Wake Up With Jaggu & Tarana	Co-host	Josh FM (Dubai)
2017-2021	The Jaggu and Tarana Show	Co-host	Suno 102.4 (Dubai)

== Theatre ==
Date	Name	Location	Role	Notes
Since 2024	Buckingham's New Secret	Sillypoint Productions, Mumbai, India	Rachel	
Since 2022	Pink is the New Black	Sillypoint Productions, Mumbai, India	Gayatri	
2009–2010	Some Girl(s)	Q Theatre Productions, Mumbai, India	as Bobby/ Shivani	

== Dubbing ==
Film	Original actress	Role	Dubbed Language	Original Language	Original year release	Dubbed year release	Note(s)
Eragon			Hindi	English	2006	2006	
300	Lena Headey	Queen Gorgo (first dub)	Hindi	English	2007	2007	Voiced a character for the Sound & Vision India Hindi dub.

== Animated films ==
Film title	Role	Original voice	Dub Language	Original language	Original Year Release	Dub year Release	Notes
Quest for Camelot			Hindi	English	1998	Unknown	

== Story Writing ==
Platform	Title	Notes
Jio Hotstar	Kull	with Althea Kaushal
