= Tarun Katial =

Indian broadcast executive (born 1975)

Chief Executive Officer of Reliance Broadcast Network
- Former
- In office 2006–2018

Chief Executive Officer of ZEE5
- Former
- In office May 2018 – November 2020

Personal details
- Born: 7 January 1975 (age 51) Chandigarh, India
- Spouse: Monisha Singh Katial
- Occupation: Executive, CEO
- Awards: Indian Telly Awards (2002)

Tarun Katial (born 7 January 1975) is an Indian media executive and businessman, known for his work in Indian television. He is the founder and CEO at Coto, and was CEO of Reliance Broadcast Network and ZEE5 (2018–2020). He was a founder and CEO of Big FM.

He is now an investor in the media-tech space and invests in edutech and media-tech businesses. Results and Outcomes, Genius Inside, Serendpity MediaTech, Lomotif are some of the ventures. He was a senior advisor at Lomotif during the sale for 120 million.

He is the founder & CEO of Eve World, a Web3 social community platform for women.

Katial began his career at Saatchi & Saatchi, Enterprise Nexus Lowe and Ogilvy & Mather, and later moved to Star Network, headed several channels across the networks in India before moving to Sony Entertainment Television as its business head in 2004. He received the Indian Telly Awards in 2002 for Best TV Programming Executive of The Year category. The next year, he was nominated for same award for Best TV Programming Head of the Year category.

== Life and career ==
Tarun Katial was born on 7 January 1975. He studied Master of Management (MBA) from University of Mumbai. He started his career as a media trainee at Saatchi & Saatchi, and later became a media executive at Enterprise Nexus Lowe and Ogilvy & Mather, senior vice-president of Star Plus. He worked as a business head and executive vice-president of Sony Entertainment Television.

He was head of channels at Star Network before joining the Sony Pictures as business head and executive vice-president in 2004. In 2006, He founded Big FM, a private radio station, where he worked as a COO and CEO for over 12 years.

He worked as a CEO of Reliance Broadcast Network till 2016, then joined ZEE5 in November and became its CEO in May 2018. He resigned his position from ZEE5 in November 2020.

== Works ==
Katial was responsible for several successful Indian television shows which include Indian Idol, Kaun Banega Crorepati (KBC), Bigg Boss, Fear Factor: Khatron Ke Khiladi and Jassi Jaissi Koi Nahin. Under his leadership, ZEE5, hosted over 100 programs in various genres and languages.

While working as CEO of Reliance Broadcast Network, he founded the BIG Star Entertainment Awards in 2010 in collaboration with Star India. In 2019, Katial participated in the 24th Paley International Council Summit, and became the first Indian CEO from the OTT industry to speak at the Paley International Council Summit.

== Personal life ==
Katial is married with Monisha Singh Katial.

== Awards and nominations ==
Year	Award	Category	Result	Ref.
2002	Indian Telly Awards	TV Programming Executive of The Year	Won	
2003	Indian Telly Awards	Indian Telly Award for Best TV Programming Head of the Year	Nominated	
