= Tina Parekh =

Indian television actress

Tina Parekh Hazra
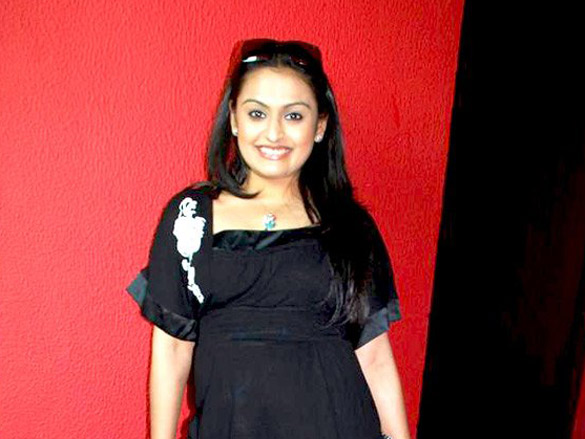
- Parekh at the press conference of Padmini Kolhapure’s movie Saath Rahenge Always in 2010
- Born: 1979; Jaipur Rajasthan, India
- Other names: Tina Parekh; Tina Parakh
- Occupations: Model, Actress, Television Presenter
- Years active: 2000–2008
- Spouse: Vikram Hazra

Tina Parekh (born 1979) is an Indian Television actress and voice actress. She is best known for her roles as Shruti Om Agarwal in Kahaani Ghar Ghar Kii, as Mukti Deshmukh in Kasautii Zindagii Kay and as Melissa in Khichdi and Instant Khichdi. She played Mihir Mishra's mom in the commercial advertisement of BSNL B-fone.

== Filmography ==
=== Television ===
Show	Role	Citation (s)
Son Pari	Jennifer	
Ssshhhh...Koi Hai - Vidyut	Divya (Episode 1)	
Manshaa	Rhea	
Ssshhhh...Phir Koi Hai - Mannmohini	Mohini (Episode 66 & 67)	
Dollar Bahu	Jyoti	
Kahaani Ghar Ghar Kii	Shruti Om Agarwal/Shruti Sameer Kaul	
Kasautii Zindagii Kay	Mukti Deshmukh / Devki Basu	
Kahani Terrii Merrii	Tara	
Khichdi	Melissa Parekh	
Instant Khichdi	Melissa Parekh	
Jamegi Jodi.Com		
Kabhi Kabhii Pyaar Kabhi Kabhii Yaar	Herself	
Idea Ek Se Badhkar Ek	Herself (Host)	
Hip Hip Hurray	Mona	
Kehta Hai Dil	Anju manju	
Shubh Kadam		
Astitva...Ek Prem Kahani	Cameo Role	
Peehar	Nandini	

=== Dubbing roles ===
==== Live action films ====
Film title	Actress	Character	Dub Language	Original Language	Original Year release	Dub Year release	Notes
Pirates of the Caribbean: Dead Man's Chest	Naomie Harris	Tia Dalma	Hindi	English	2006	2006	
Pirates of the Caribbean: At World's End	Naomie Harris	Tia Dalma / Calypso	Hindi	English	2007	2007	
Guardians of the Galaxy	Karen Gillan	Nebula	Hindi	English	2014	2014	Released as "Brahmand Ke Boss" (ब्रह्मांड के रक्षक) for the title of the Hindi dubbed version and she was credited as: "Tina Parakh" in the Hindi dub credits for the DVD release.
Guardians of the Galaxy Vol. 2	Karen Gillan	Nebula	Hindi	English	2017	2017	
Avengers: Infinity War	Karen Gillan	Nebula	Hindi	English	2018	2018	
Avengers: Endgame	Karen Gillan	Nebula	Hindi	English	2019	2019	
Deadpool	Gina Carano	Angel Dust	Hindi	English	2016	2016	

== Awards ==
- Indian Telly Award 2006 Best Actress in Supporting Role - Kasautii Zindagii Kay
- Sinsui TV Award 2006 Best Actress in Supporting Role - Kasautii Zindagii Kay
