= StarPlus =

Indian Hindi-language television channel

- Logo used since 2018
- Type: Television Channel
- Country: India
- Broadcast area: Worldwide (Except in Iran and North Korea)
- Headquarters: Mumbai, Maharashtra, India

Programming
- Languages: English (1991–2000); Hindi (1996–present)
- Picture format: 1080p HDTV

Ownership
- Owner: JioStar

History
- Launched: 15 December 1991; 34 years ago
- Replaced by: Star Plus (Europe)

Links
- Website: Star Plus on JioHotstar

Availability

Terrestrial
- Disney+ Hotstar: Indonesia, Malaysia, Thailand, Vietnam, Canada, United Kingdom, Bangladesh and Singapore

Streaming media
- JioHotstar: India
- Hulu: United States

StarPlus is an Indian Hindi-language general entertainment pay television channel owned by JioStar, a joint venture between Reliance Industries, Viacom18 and Disney India. Its programming consists of family dramas, romantic dramas, comedies, reality shows and crime shows.

== History ==
It was first launched on 15 December 1991, as Star Entertainment. At that time, it was an English language entertainment television channel, broadcasting international television shows from the United States, United Kingdom, Australia and New Zealand, with Zee TV being the Hindi-language counterpart.

On 21 February 1992, it was renamed as StarPlus. This change was seen in other countries from 1 July 1992 onwards.

After Star ended its relationship with Zee TV on 30 June 2000, StarPlus was transformed completely into a Hindi-language channel from the next day - 1 July 2000 (from April 1996 to June 2000, StarPlus was a bilingual TV channel consisting of Hindi and English programmes), with Star World becoming the network's English-language counterpart channel. The company's CEO Sameer Nair and programming chief Tarun Katial introduced a number of new shows, which helped solidify the channel's position as a large influence in Hindi-language television broadcasting.

The channel launched in the United States in November 2004.

The channel's high-definition feed was launched on 15 April 2011.

StarPlus HD was set to launch in both the United Kingdom and Ireland by the end of 2011, but it was delayed until 5 July 2012.

On 6 October 2017, Canada's ATN Channel lost rights to Star programming, with viewers directed to the new streaming service Hotstar, which was recently introduced into the Canadian market.

On 4 January 2019, Star similarly shut down its linear channels in the United States, in favour of Hotstar. On 14 September 2023, Dish Network and Sling TV relaunched Star Plus and other Disney Star channels in the United States.

=== Rebranding ===
On 14 June 2010, at 12:15 AM IST, just before the conclusion of the Star Parivaar Awards, which had begun the previous day at 8:00 PM, it underwent a rebranding along with a change from the blue rectangular logo to a ruby red star with the tagline "Rishta Wahi, Soch Nayi" (Same Relationship, New Thinking). The signature tune was composed by Shankar–Ehsaan–Loy and rendered by Shreya Ghoshal.

On 7 November 2016, it underwent a rebranding with the tagline "Nayi Soch" (New Thinking).

On 27 May 2018, it underwent a rebranding with the red crystal star with gold swoosh along with the tagline "Rishta Wahi, Baat Nayi" (Same Relationship, New Conversations), and a signature song composed by A. R. Rahman.

On 30 December 2020, Disney announced that the Star branding in the Netherlands would be replaced with Utsav from 22 January 2021. On 22 January 2021, StarPlus became Utsav Plus in the UK and Europe. JioStar reverted to StarPlus in the UK and Europe on August 13, 2026.

== Reception ==
In 2000, StarPlus was at third position in terms of revenue and viewership after Zee TV and Sony Entertainment Television while none of the series were in top 10. With the launch of Indian Hindi version of Who Wants to Be a Millionaire?, Kaun Banega Crorepati, hosted by Amitabh Bachchan, emerged as a major blockbuster, becoming the number one show in 2000 followed by the launch of Ekta Kapoor's Kyunki Saas Bhi Kabhi Bahu Thi, on the same day which became the second most watched show in 2000, which soon beat KBC after the new year to the number one position, held for the next 6 years, while StarPlus emerged as the most watched channel. This followed Kahaani Ghar Ghar Kii in October 2000 and later Kasautii Zindagi Kay a year after it and many more produced under Balaji Telefilms which made StarPlus to achieve the highest viewership during that time, making it the channel at No. 1 position since. Most of the series (80-90%) aired in the channel during that period were produced by Balaji Telefilms. 70% of the revenue for the production house was obtained from Star then. After 2006, their top rated shows started to decline in viewership and were axed one by one by the channel. Later Sapna Babul Ka... Bidaai became the first Hindi GEC to beat Kyunki Saas Bhi Kabhi Bahu Thi to the top position at that time garnering 5.28 TVR during first week January 2008. Until March 2008, it shuffled in and out of top ten shows. In March 2008, it got 6 TVR on one of the leads Sadhana and Alekh's wedding track. Since April 2008 to September 2008, it was consistently the number one series except twice in June 2008, when it was pushed to second by Kyunki Saas Bhi Kabhi Bahu Thi and Star Parivaar Awards. In the week during 5 to 11 October 2008, it was second most watched after Balika Vadhu with 6 TVR. Its highest rating garnered in the year was 8.8 TVR for the Taj Mahotsav sequence in October 2008. In November 2008 overall, it was the second most watched Hindi show with averaging between 5 and 6 TVR. However, during 2008, differences arouse between Star India and Balaji due to termination of their serials over declining ratings, cancellation of joint venture for regional content in South India and as a result the agreement of Balaji buying Star's stake was terminated. Both suffered some downfall after it. However, after two years, they patched up and Tere Liye was the show produced after it in 2010. During the slight downfall in viewership in the end of the 2000s the No.1 position dominated by it for nine years continuously was beaten by the rival channel Colors TV in April 2009 for the first time pushing it to second position. During last week of May 2009, it was beaten by Zee TV for the first time in nine years, pushing it to third position and only Yeh Rishta Kya Kehlata Hai had maintained its ratings among the list of the Top 10 shows. After Yeh Rishta Kya Kehlata Hai maintaining its ratings among Top 10, few other shows like Saath Nibhaana Saathiya, Diya Aur Baati Hum, Iss Pyaar Ko Kya Naam Doon?, Yeh Hai Mohabbatein and Mann Kee Awaaz Pratigya helped StarPlus to regain their position into Top 10.

On week 12 of 2020, while it dropped to fifth position in Hindi GEC while overall at sixth position in India, the following week the channel did not even feature in top ten Indian channels owing COVID-19 pandemic when production and new episodes broadcast were halted and reruns began.

Post first lockdown, in 2020, a new line-up of shows like Anupamaa, Ghum Hai Kisikey Pyaar Meiin, Saath Nibhaana Saathiya 2, Imlie,Yeh Hai Chahatein and Pandya Store helped StarPlus regain their position.

== Programming ==
From 2 October 2022, StarPlus extended its fiction airtime band to seven days a week. All shows aired everyday since then.
