= Ravi Raj =

Director Of Telivision Films

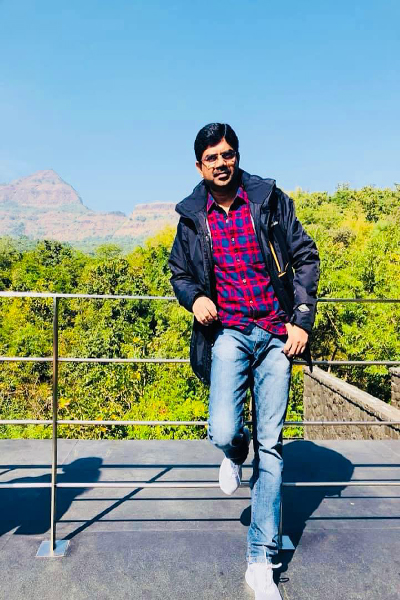
- Born: Jamshedpur (Jharkhand)
- Occupations: Director & Producer
- Years active: 2000 to Present
- Known for: Swaragini - Jodein Rishton Ke Sur & Agniphera (TV series)
- Notable work: Bhabhi; Woh Rehne Waali Mehlon Ki; Kkusum; Ye Meri Life Hai; Devi; Kahaani Ghar Ghar Kii; Showreel

Ravi Raj (born Jamshedpur, Jharkhand) is a well-known television and film director and producer in India. He started his production house "Ravi Raj Creations" in 2017 & launched Agniphera, Ankit Gera, Yukti Kapoor Simran Kaur, are going to play leads in the show, he has Directed many TV shows include Swaragini and Woh Rehne Waali Mahlon Ki.

== Director ==
=== Television ===
- Swaragini- Colors TV
- Bhabhi- STAR Plus ( 500 episodes)
- Devi SONY Entertainment Television ( 104 episodes)
- Yeh Meri Life Hai - SONY Entertainment Television(200 episodes)
- Ek Ladki Anjani Si SONY Entertainment Television( 200 episodes)
- Miilee- Star TV.( 110 episodes)
- Woh Rehne Waali Mehlon Ki - Sahara One (600 episodes)
- Grihastii- STAR Plus(105 Episodes)
- Aise Karo Naa Vidaa - Colors TV.(90 episodes)
- Sabki Laadli Bebo - STAR Plus.(200 episodes)
- Beend Banoongaa Ghodi Chadhunga -Imagine TV .(150 episodes)
- Phir Subah Hogi Zee TV.( 90 episodes)
- Punar Vivah - Ek Nayi Umeed- Zee TV.(90 episodes)
- Anamika - SONY Entertainment Television (110 episodes)
- Dil Ki Nazar Se Khoobsurat -SONY Entertainment Television (50 Episodes)
- Kaisa Yeh Ishq Hai... Ajab Sa Risk Hai -Life OK(240 Episodes)

== Producer ==
- Laal Ishq - &TV
- Mauka-E-Vardaat - &TV
