= Indian Telly Award for Fresh New Face – Female =

Award in the Indian Telly Awards

- Country: India
- Presented by: IndianTelevision.com
- First award: 2004
- Website: Indian Telly Awards

Indian Telly Award for Fresh New Face – Female is an award given by Indiantelevision.com as part of its annual Indian Telly Awards for TV serials.

== List of winners ==
=== 2000s ===
- 2001 Not Awarded
- 2002 Not Awarded
- 2003 Not Awarded
- 2004 Aamna Shariff – Kahiin To Hoga as Kashish
  - Geetanjali Tikekar – Kasautii Zindagii Kay as Aparna
  - Jasmeet Walia (Mona Singh) – Jassi Jaissi Koi Nahin as Jassi
  - Shama Sikander – Ye Meri Life Hai as Pooja
  - Sai Deodhar – Saara Akaash as Flight Lt Monica
- 2005 Mona Wasu – Miilee as Miilee
  - Priya Wal – Remix as Anvesha Bannerjee
  - Kulraj Randhawa – Kareena Kareena as Kareena
  - Neha Bamb – Kaisa Ye Pyar Hai as Kripa
  - Amrita Saluja – Time Bomb 9/11 as Roma
- 2006 Prachi Desai – Kasamh Se as Bani (tied with) Rajshree Thakur – Saat Phere – Saloni Ka Safar as Saloni
  - Kanchi Kaul – Ek Ladki Anjaani Si as Ananya Sachdeva
  - Priyanka Bassi – Bombay Talking as Sheena
  - Sanjeeda Sheikh – Kyaa Hoga Nimmo Kaa as Nimmo
  - Mouni Roy – Kyunki Saas Bhi Kabhi Bahu Thi as Krishnatulsi
- 2007 Divyanka Tripathi – Banoo Mein Teri Dulhann as Vidya
  - Twinkle Bajpai – Ghar Ki Lakshmi Betiyaan as Lakshmi
  - Pallavi Subhash – Karam Apnaa Apnaa as Gauri Shiv Kapoor
  - Shalini Chandran – Kahaani Ghar Ghar Ki as Maithili
  - Suhasi Dhami – Aek Chabhi Hai Padoss Mein as Urmi
  - Shubhangi Atre Poorey – Kasturi as Kasturi
- 2008 Avika Gor – Balika Vadhu as Anandi
  - Sara Khan – Sapna Babul Ka...Bidaai as Sadhna
  - Parul Chauhan – Sapna Babul Ka...Bidaai as Ragini
  - Additi Gupta – Kis Desh Mein Hai Meraa Dil as Heer
  - Abigail Jain – Kya Dill Mein Hai as Kakoon
- 2009 Hina Khan – Yeh Rishta Kya Kehlata Hai as Akshara
  - Rubina Dilaik – Choti Bahu as Radhika
  - Ankita Lokhande – Pavitra Rishta as Archana
  - Kritika Kamra – Kitani Mohabbat Hai as Arohi Sharma
  - Shivshakti Sachdev – Sabki Laadli Bebo as Bebo

=== 2010s ===
- 2010 Anupriya Kapoor – Tere Liye as Tani
  - Pratyusha Banerjee – Balika Vadhu as Anandi
  - Smriti Kalra – 12/24 Karol Bagh as Simran
  - Neha Jhulka – Dill Mill Gayye as Dr. Naina Mehta
  - Neha Sargam – Chand Chupa Badal Mein as Nivedita
- 2011 No Award
- 2012 Aakanksha Singh – Na Bole Tum Na Maine Kuch Kaha as Megha Mohan Bhatnagar
  - Mitali Nag – Afsar Bitiya as Krishna Raj
  - Aishwarya Sakhuja – Saas Bina Sasural as Tanya Tej Prakash Chaturvedi (Toasty)
  - Soumya Seth – Navya as Navya Anant Bajpai
  - Deepika Singh – Diya Aur Baati Hum as Sandhya Sooraj Rathi
  - Kirti Nagpure – Parichay—Nayee Zindagi Kay Sapno Ka as Siddhi Kunal Chopra
- 2013 Disha Parmar – Pyaar Ka Dard Hai Meetha Meetha Pyaara Pyaara as Pankhuri Aditya Kumar'
  - Ekta Kaul – Rab Se Sohna Isshq as Sahiba Ranveer Singh
  - Shiny Doshi – Saraswatichandra as Kusum Danny Vyas
  - Surbhi Jyoti – Qubool Hai as Zoya Siddiqui
  - Roopal Tyagi – Sapne Suhane Ladakpan Ke as Gunjan
  - Shamin Mannan – Sanskaar – Dharohar Apnon Ki as Bhoomi Jaikishan Vaishnav
- 2014 Paridhi Sharma – Jodha Akbar as Jodha
  - Pooja Sharma – Mahabharat as Draupadi
  - Digangana Suryavanshi – Ek Veer Ki Ardaas...Veera as Veera
  - Farnaz Shetty – Ek Veer Ki Ardaas...Veera as Gunjan
  - Preetika Rao – Beintehaa as Aaliya Zain Abdullah
  - Harshita Gaur – Sadda Haq as Sanyukta Agarwal
- 2015 Radhika Madan – Meri Aashiqui Tum Se Hi as Ishaani
  - Pooja Sharma – Mahabharat as Draupadi
  - Shamin Mannan – Sanskaar – Dharohar Apnon Ki as Bhoomi Jaikishan Vaishnav
  - Shivangi Joshi – Begusarai as Poonam Lakhan Thakur
  - Roopal Tyagi – Sapne Suhane Ladakpan Ke as Gunjan
- 2019 Aakriti Sharma – Kullfi Kumarr Bajewala as Kullfi
- 2023 Surabhi Das – Nima Denzongpa as Nima
- 2025 Tanishq Seth - Mann Atisundar as Radhika Divyam Bansal
