= Yukti Kapoor =

Indian television actress

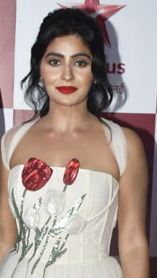
- Kapoor in 2023
- Born: 18 May 1992 (age 34); Jaipur, Rajasthan, India
- Occupation: Actress
- Years active: 2010-present
- Known for: Siya Ke Ram; Agniphera; Maddam Sir

Yukti Kapoor (born 18 May 1992) is an Indian actress who mainly works in Hindi television. She is best known for her roles in Siya Ke Ram, Agniphera and Maddam Sir.

== Personal life ==
In April 2022, Kapoor stated that she was in a happy relationship. She has also spoken about maintaining a simple fitness routine that includes regular meals and yoga.

== Career ==
=== Debut and breakthrough (2010-2018) ===
Kapoor made her acting debut in 2010 with Nanhi Si Kali Meri Laadli where she was seen as Guddi. She subsequently appeared as Tanu Chauhan in Jhilmil Sitaaron Ka Aangan Hoga, Bittoo in Pyaar Ka Dard Hai Meetha Meetha Pyaara Pyaara and Mayura Dunavati in Yeh Hai Mohabbatein in 2013. In the same year, she made her film debut with the Bhojpuri film Ka Ukhaad Leba where she played Mona Bai.

In 2015, she made her Hindi film debut with Uvaa. Later in the same year, she landed her first major role in Star Plus's Siya Ke Ram, where she portrayed Urmila opposite Karan Suchak.

In 2016, she played the role of Sudha Shekhwat in Balika Vadhu.

In 2017, she played one of the protagonist Ragini Singh in Agnifera alongside Ankit Gera and Simran Kaur.

=== Success and further career (2019-present) ===
Agnifera took a leap in 2018, after which she portrayed her character's on-screen daughter Agni Singh Thakur alongside Samridh Bawa and Kaur (coincidentally portraying Kaur's earlier character's daughter) till 2019. Later, Kapoor played Swetha in an episode of Laal Ishq with Vikram Sakhalkar. The same year, she portrayed Lakshmi, Alakshmi and Matrikas in Namah alongside Savi Thakur.

In 2020, she appeared in her first music video Fakiri. From 2020 to 2023, Kapoor portrayed the role of a Lucknow based cop Karishma Singh in Sony SAB's Maddam Sir alongside Gulki Joshi. In 2022, she also portrayed Kareena Singh, the twin-sister of her onscreen character Karishma Singh in Maddam Sir, in her third dual role.

In 2023, she portrayed as Keerti Shukla in Star Plus's Keh Doon Tumhein alongside Mudit Nayar.

== Filmography ==
=== Films ===
Key
†	Denotes films that have not yet been released

Year	Title	Role	Language	Notes	Ref.
2015	Uvaa	Roshni	Hindi		
2024	Break The Silence	Arti	Hindi	Short film	
2026	Bihu Attack	Ruchita	Hindi		

=== Television ===
Year	Title	Role	Notes	Ref.
2010	Nanhi Si Kali Meri Laadli	Guddi		
2013	Jhilmil Sitaaron Ka Aangan Hoga	Tanu Chauhan		
2015–2016	Siya Ke Ram	Urmila		
2016	Balika Vadhu	Sudha Shekhwat Shekhar		
2017–2018	Agniphera	Ragini Singh		
2018-2019	Agniphera	Agni Singh Thakur		
2019	Laal Ishq	Swetha	Episode: "Tilasmi Almari"	
2019	Namah Lakshmi Narayan	Lakshmi / Alakshmi		
2020–2023	Maddam Sir	Karishma Singh		
2022	Maddam Sir	Kaushalya "Kareena" Singh		
2023	Keh Doon Tumhein	Kirti Shukla		

==== Special appearances ====
Year	Title	Role	Notes	Ref.
2013	Pyaar Ka Dard Hai Meetha Meetha Pyaara Pyaara	Bittoo		
2013	Yeh Hai Mohabbatein	Mayura Dunavati		
2020	Kuch Smiles Ho Jayein... With Alia	Karishma Singh	Episode 4	
2021	Ziddi Dil Maane Na	Karishma Singh	Episode 67	
2022	Good Night India	Karishma Singh	Episode 29	

=== Web series ===
Year	Title	Role	Notes	Ref.
2024	The Return	Navya Sinha		
2025	Pati Patni Aur Padosan	Pratibha		
2025	Sarpanch Sahab	Madhu		
2025	Let's Play Blind	Neeta		
2025	Rishqiyaan: Dil, Dosti aur Dhokha	Arohi	Microdrama	
2025	The Royal Affair	Kirti Rai	Microdrama	
2025	Don't Touch My Wife	Navya Singh	Microdrama	
2025	The Missing CEO	Anika	Microdrama	
2025	Mafia vs Police	Tara Khanna	Microdrama	
2026	Love, Lies & Murder	Suhana Singhania	Microdrama	
2026	Kill Kabier	Ananya	Microdrama	
2026	Dil Se Deewangi Tak	Sia	Microdrama	
2026	Don of Jaunpur	Avni Singh	Microdrama	

=== Music videos ===
Year	Title	Singer	Ref.
2020	Fakiri	Jyotica Tangri	
2021	Dhat	Arko Pravo Mukherjee	
2021	Mere Sath	Nicks Kukreja	
2022	Kya Fark Padta Hai	Dev Negi	

== Awards and nominations ==
Year	Award	Category	Work	Result	Ref.
2022	21st Indian Television Academy Awards	Best Actress - Comedy	Maddam Sir	Nominated	
2022	22nd Indian Television Academy Awards	Popular Actress (Drama)	Maddam Sir	Nominated	

== See also ==
- List of Indian television actresses
- List of Hindi television actresses
