= Abeer Singh Godhwani =

Indian actor (born 1988)

- Born: 26 March 1988 (age 38); Mumbai, India
- Occupation: Actor
- Years active: 2008–present
- Known for: Jugni Chali Jalandhar; Iss Pyaar Ko Kya Naam Doon?; Diya Aur Baati Hum; Agnifera; Yeh Rishta Kya Kehlata Hai

Abeer Singh Godhwani (born 26 March 1988) also known as Karan Godhwani is an Indian actor who works in Hindi television. He is known for his portrayal of Vikramjeet Bhalla in Jugni Chali Jalandhar, Nandkishore Mittal in Iss Pyaar Ko Kya Naam Doon?, Vikram Rathi in Diya Aur Baati Hum, Kishan Thakur in Agnifera and Kairav Goenka in Yeh Rishta Kya Kehlata Hai.

== Life and family ==
Godhwani was born on 26 March 1988 in Barcelona, Spain. In 2019, Godhwani married his long-time girlfriend Tanya Singh in Mumbai.

== Career ==
He started his career, portraying the role of The NRI VikramJeet a.k.a. Vicky Bhalla in Sab TV's Comedy/Drama, jugni-chali-jalandhar. He Then Played the street smart, Adi in Color's Show, Rang badalti Odhani. He played in Zee TV's show Sanjog Se Bani Sangini as Shankar. He then entered Star Plus's Iss Pyaar Ko Kya Naam Doon? as N.K.

His next role came in the Colors TV's show Chhal-Sheh Aur Maat as Ranveer Jaiswal. Later on in the year 2013, He got the opportunity to play the magical, charming, funny, and handsome character of Jin Johnny, In the Sab TV's Comedy, Jeannie Aur Juju. After That he got the role of Rahul Pyarelal in the Color's Show, Mrs. Pammi Pyarelal. He then reentered Jeannie Aur Juju in late 2013. After that he got to portray another Negative Role in Life Ok's Hum Ne Li Hai Shapath as a game boy super villain. He then Interacted with Sab TV again for his 3rd Time, another comedy show, Tu Mere agal bagal hai as Rohit, a negative role, but only for the beginning.

Finally he was offered a show airing on Star Plus. The very famous and popular, Diya Aur Baati hum, replacing Gautum Gulati as Vikram Rathi. In September 2014, he joined the cast of Diya Aur Baati Hum as Vikram Rathi. In 2017, he joined the show Dil Se Dil Tak, which premiered on Colors TV on 30 January 2017. He also plays the role of Kaushal in Sab TV show TV, Biwi aur Main. He also played the role of Akshay Kapoor in the serial Kasam Tere Pyaar Ki post the leap.

In 2018, Goddwani played the lead role of Kishan Thakur in the &TV serial Agniphera alongside Yukti Kapoor and Simraan Kaur. In 2020, he made a cameo appearance Sujoy Banerjee in Sony TV's Ishaaron Ishaaron Mein. In 2022, he enter Colors TV's popular show Naagin 6 as Inspector Vijay Shukla. From January 2023 to November 2023, he portrayed Kairav Goenka opposite Shambhavi Singh in StarPlus' Yeh Rishta Kya Kehlata Hai.

== Filmography ==
=== Television ===
| Year | Title | Role | Notes | Ref. |
|---|---|---|---|---|
| 2008–2010 | Jugni Chali Jalandhar | Vikramjeet "Vicky" Bhalla | Lead Role | |
| 2010 | Rang Badalti Odhani | Adi | | |
| 2010 | Sanjog Se Bani Sangini | Shankar | | |
| 2011–2012 | Iss Pyaar Ko Kya Naam Doon? | Nandkishore "NK" Mittal | | |
| 2012 | Chhal – Sheh Aur Maat | Ranveer Jaiswal | | |
| 2013 | Mrs. Pammi Pyarelal | Rahul Pyarelal | Lead Role | |
| 2013–2014 | Jeannie Aur Juju | Jin Johnny | Cameo appearance | |
| 2014–2016 | Diya Aur Baati Hum | Vikram Rathi | | |
| 2017 | Dil Se Dil Tak | Suyog Bhanushali | | |
| 2017 | TV Biwi Aur Main | Kushal | | |
| 2018 | Kasam Tere Pyaar Ki | Akshay "Akki" Kapoor | | |
| 2018–2019 | Agnifera | Kishan Thakur | Lead Role | |
| 2020 | Ishaaron Ishaaron Mein | Sujoy Banerjee | | |
| 2022 | Naagin 6 | Inspector Vijay Shukla | | |
| 2023 | Yeh Rishta Kya Kehlata Hai | Kairav Goenka | | |
| 2025 | Mannat – Har Khushi Paane Ki | Puneet Saluja | | |
