= Laal Ishq (Indian TV series) =

Indian horror comedy-cum-romantic comedy series

- Laal Ishq Poster
- Genre: Romance; Horror
- Written by: Various
- Screenplay by: Various
- Directed by: Ravi Raj; Neeraj Pandey; Sachin
- Country of origin: India
- Original language: Hindi
- No. of seasons: 1
- No. of episodes: 233

Production
- Producers: Anshuman Pratap Singh; Sridhar Makhija; Ravi Raj; Sachin Mohite; Darpan Patel
- Cinematography: Various
- Camera setup: Multi-camera
- Running time: 40-47 minutes
- Production companies: Jaasvand Entertainments; Ravi Raj Creations; Dhaivat Records & Productions

Original release
- Network: &TV
- Release: 23 June 2018 – 27 September 2020

Laal Ishq (Cursed Love) is an Indian Hindi romantic horror television series that aired on &TV. The series premiered on 23 June 2018 under the production of Jaasvand Entertainments. It is produced by Anshuman Pratap Singh, Sachin Mohite, Sridhar Makhija, Darpan Patel and Ravi Raj.

== Plot ==
The romantic horror series is about the mysterious life and events of couples. Every episode starts with a new couple. The show focuses on the never-ending love of the couples. It also shows love triangle stories.

== Cast ==
Each episode starts with a new cast.

Episode No.	Telecast date	Title	Cast	
1.	23 June 2018	Chalawa	Sayantani Ghosh as Neighbour Bhabhi, Veebha Anand as Gunjan, Karam Rajpal as Akshay	
2.	24 June 2018	Raatrani	Zain Imam as Arjun, Mahhi Vij as Seher	
3.	30 June 2018	Gudiya	Preetika Rao as Mahima Malhotra (Mahi), Priyank Sharma as Vivaan, Niti Taylor as Chitra Sachdev (Cheeni), Aishwarya Raj Bhakuni as Mini	
4.	1 July 2018	Eternal Beauty	Gaurav Khanna as Dr. Avinash, Ishita Ganguly as Nitya (witch)	
5.	7 July 2018	Call Of The Night	Donal Bisht as Riya, Mrunal Jain as Harsh / Suraj	
6.	8 July 2018	Prophecy	Akansha Sareen as Kajal, Rohan Mehra as Rohan, Palak Jain as Janvi	
7.	14 July 2018	Saree	Rhea Sharma as Komal Mishra, Ruslaan Mumtaz as Nirmal Singh, Akash Gill as Bunty.	
8.	15 July 2018	Kundali	Mishkat Varma as Shaurya Saxena, Ankitta Sharma as Radhika	
9.	21 July 2018	Chetkin	Sana Amin Sheikh as Manjari, Antara Banerjee as Kesar, Ankit Siwach as Prabhu	
10.	22 July 2018	Moksh	Abhishek Rawat as Karan, Barkha Sengupta as Shalini, Amit Behl	
11.	28 July 2018	Shakhchunni	Shiny Doshi as Khushi, Neil Bhatt as Aditya	
12.	29 July 2018	Best Friend	Jay Soni as Dushyant, Simran Pareenja as Nayan	
13.	4 August 2018	Petni	Devoleena Bhattacharjee as Manorama, Mohammad Nazim as Sikandar	
14.	5 August 2018	Kareeb	Chhavi Mittal, Ravish Desai, Girish Pal as Chetantanya.	
15.	11 August 2018	Kokh	Priyal Gor as Sonia, Naman Shaw as Dhruv	
16.	12 August 2018	Soul Transformation	Chetan Hansraj as Abhishek, Aadesh Chaudhary as Vivek, Mansi Srivastava as Nitya	
17.	18 August 2018	I Love Books	Shaleen Bhanot as Prince / Niku, Sonia Balani as Simran / Shanno, Simpy Singh	
18.	19 August 2018	Black Widow	Prince Narula as Aryan (Ghost), Yuvika Chaudhary as Shikha	
19.	25 August 2018	Baba Bangali	Kinshuk Mahajan as Veer, Sana Saeed as Maya, Pratima Kazmi as Raka	
20.	26 August 2018	Ateet	Tanya Sharma as Radhika, Abhishek Verma as Arjun	
21.	1 September 2018	Bhoot Baraat	Ajay Chaudhary as Rawal, Umang Jain as Siddhi, Piyush Suhane as Thakur	
22.	2 September 2018	Pishachani	Sonia Singh, Gulki Joshi, Nikita Dutta, Anuj Sachdeva	
23.	8 September 2018	Shraap	Aneri Vajani as Shreya, Samridh Bawa as Rishi	
24.	9 September 2018	Jinn	Rohan Gandotra as Ashwak Khan, Manoj Chandila as Ali Khan, Nalini Negi as Rukhsar Khan	
25.	15 September 2018	Main Phir Bhi Tumko Chahunga	Kanwar Dhillon as Sangram, Yashashri Masurkar as Devyani, Somit Jain as Rohit, Gagan Anand as Sameer, Neha Bam as Devyani's mother	
26.	16 September 2018	Ghoonghat Mein Chanda Hai	Vipul Gupta as Neel, Fenil Umrigar as Naina, Falaq Naaz as Kamini	
27.	22 September 2018	Mayong	Pankhuri Awasthy Rode, Jason Tham	
28.	23 September 2018	Blind Love	Keerti Nagpure as Drishti, Rahil Azam as Aadarsh	
29.	29 September 2018	Maid	Pracheen Chauhan as Chandar, Sheetal Dabholkar as Sheeva, Supriya Kumari as Bindiya	
30.	30 September 2018	Yar Meri Zindagi	Manish Goplani as Mayank, Anupriya Kapoor	
31.	6 October 2018	Brothers	Kishwer Merchant as Daisy, Suyyash Rai as Shawn, Viren Singh Rathore as David, Avtaar Vaishnavi as Daisy and David's son	
32.	7 October 2018	Premonition	Tina Philip as Roshni, Mohit Malhotra as Shivam	
33.	20 October 2018	Dance Bar	Swati Kapoor as Amrita, Sambhavna Seth, Aakash Talwar	
34.	21 October 2018	Mithun Rashi	Meherzan Mazda as Rishabh, Prakriti Nautiyal	
35.	27 October 2018	Vatsavitri	Krip Suri as Shrikant, Aparna Dixit as Savitri	
36.	28 October 2018	Dreams	Angad Hasija as Akash, Sara Khan as Mallika, Ashita Zaveri as Roshni	
37.	3 November 2018	Kya Aap Akele Hain	Narayani Shastri as Sejal, Mridul Kumar Sinha, Jatin Shah, Sneha Jain as Hiral	
38.	4 November 2018	Antarmahal	Viraf Patel as Amar, Debina Bonnerjee as Vidhya aka Vidu, Sheena Shahabadi	
39.	10 November 2018	Jhankini	Helly Shah as Deepali, Anuj Sachdeva as Nikhil, Jayshree T. as Nikhil's mother	
40.	11 November 2018	Pakdau Dulha	Shivani Surve, Vineet Kumar Chaudhary	
41.	15 December 2018	Shaitani Chehra	Paras Arora as Karan, Jigyasa Singh as Paayal, Aftab Alam	
42.	16 December 2018	Paapi Gudda	Shivya Pathania as Priya, Maitrik Thakkar as Balla	
43.	22 December 2018	Jalpret	Neha Marda as Genda, Sartaj Gill as Kishore	
44.	23 December 2018	Shaitan Ki Beti	Vindhya Tiwari as Urvashi, Shresth Kumar as Anil (Anup) Agnihotri, Khushwant Walia as Atul Agnihotri	
45.	29 December 2018	Bhoot Baazaar	Vinny Arora as Madhu, Kiran Srinivas as Prakash	
46.	30 December 2018	Mayajal	Ankit Bathla as Aditya, Sanam Johar as Prem, Abigail Jain as Preeti, Adi Irani	
47.	5 January 2019	Khooni Rishta	Ayaz Ahmed as Saamy / Sameer (Sam), Tanya Sharma as Harni / Akanksha, Hargun Grover as Bhuvan	
48.	6 January 2019	Parchhai	Veebha Anand as Sheel / Jheel, Abhaas Mehta as Rishabh, Amit Dolawat as Rohit	
49.	12 January 2019	Qatil Naag Ka Tattoo	Kabeer Kumar as Aaryan, Sonal Vengurlekar as Riya, Kannan Arunachalam	
50.	13 January 2019	Naag Ka Mayajaal	Neetha Shetty as Manika (Naagin), Mayank Gandhi as Dharma (Naag), Giriraj Kabra, Ravi Jhankal	
51.	19 January 2019	Murdon Ki Baraat	Sheena Bajaj as Dr. Raani, Manoj Chandila as Dr. Rahul, Vikram Kochchar as Raja	
52.	20 January 2019	Aao Kabhi Haveli Pe	Rahul Sharma as Burjil Batiwala, Shafaq Naaz as Kareena	
53.	26 January 2019	Brahmpret	Umang Jain as Sona, Azad Ansari as Shubham, Aalika Sheikh as Bindiya	
54.	27 January 2019	Khooni Kathal	Sreejita De as Sakeena Khan, Mohammad Nazim as Saifuddin Khan	
55.	2 February 2019	Shrapit Nachaniya	Abhishek Tiwari, Aasiya Kazi as Sonali, Aishwarya Sharma as Saundarya	
56.	3 February 2019	Talaab Ki Dehshat	Shikha Singh as Vibha, Malhar Pandya as Bharat, Spandan Chaturvedi as Meera	
57.	9 February 2019	Dhankundra	Avdeep Sidhu as Abhi, Deblina Chatterjee as Paro	
58.	10 February 2019	Khoofnaak Car Ki Dikki	Fahad Ali as Bunty, Sunayana Fozdar as Sweety	
59.	16 February 2019	Khooni Wig	Paras Kalnawat as Kabir, Piyali Munshi as Meera, Neha Pednekar as Diya	
60.	17 February 2019	Khoonkhar Dulhan	Khushboo Shroff as Neha, Karan Sharma as Vicky, Umang Jain as Khushi	
61.	23 February 2019	Rahsyamaye Raaste	Gunjan Walia as Sapna, Vikas Manaktala as Balveer	
62.	24 February 2019	Gumnaam Hai Koi	Krissann Barretto as Tanya, Karan Khandelwal as Sunny	
63.	2 March 2019	Kathputli	Alan Kapoor as Meghavat (Megh) Karan Singh, Priyal Gor as Kajri	
64.	3 March 2019	Apna Time Aayyega	Sparsh Srivastav, Sunita Shirole, Toshi Shaikh	
65.	9 March 2019	Yaksh	Swati Kapoor as Suzanne, Shardul Pandit as Thomas, Shivlekh Singh	
66.	10 March 2019	Bauna Banmanus	Abraam Pandey, Shaji Chaudhary, Reena Aggarwal	
67.	16 March 2019	Mundai ka Tandav Part 1	Aishwarya Khare as Maya, Nikhil Pandey as Ram Prasad, Pooja Sethi, Anjana Nathan	
68.	17 March 2019	Mundai ka Tandav Part 2	Aishwarya Khare as Maya, Nikhil Pandey as Ram Prasad, Pooja Sethi, Anjana Nathan	
69.	23 March 2019	Kantal Danav	Khushwant Walia as Yogi, Ishani Sharma as Gunja	
70.	24 March 2019	Bijli Booth	Gaurav Khanna as Sunil, Shraddha Jaiswal as Minni, Cindrella D' Cruz	
71.	30 March 2019	Nadaan Mein Shaitaan	Sonali Nikam, Pankaj Singh	
72.	31 March 2019	Bhootkaal	Alan Kapoor as Pawan, Neha Bagga as Ritu, Diya Makhija as Kaajal	
73.	6 April 2019	Khel Dehshat Ka	Shagun Sharma as Pernia, Puneett Chouksey as Zoraan, Kiran Srinivas as Dhruv, Saar Kashyap as Keerat	
74.	7 April 2019	6 Ungli Ka Rahasya	Yash Mistry as Khariya, Shamik Abbas, Muskan Bamne	
75.	13 April 2019	Pretkalyanam	Simran Kaur as Parvati, Shubhashish Jha as Venu	
76.	14 April 2019	Singhali	Sreejita De as Shivani, Rishi Verma as Bhairav	
77.	20 April 2019	Sarp Rahasya	Ram Awana	
78.	21 April 2019	Mayavi Shev	Abigail Jain as Siya Mittal, Paras Kalnawat as Mannu Mittal	
79.	27 April 2019	Muchnowa	Antara Banerjee as Chanda, Mithil Jain as Balhari, Neetu Pandey	
80.	28 April 2019	Maya Saray	Shalini Sahuta as Saloni, Shabaaz Abdullah Badi as Samrat	
81.	4 May 2019	Pretganj ki Holi	Mohit Abrol as Prem, Farnaz Shetty as Pari	
82.	5 May 2019	Shaitani Shalaka	Neha Pednekar as Tashya Raichand, Ravi Bhatia as Bakul	
83.	11 May 2019	Shaitani Fridge Ka Kaher	Dolly Chawla, Bunty Chopra as Dev	
84.	12 May 2019	Mayavi	Kinshuk Vaidya as Dhruv / Badri, Shamin Mannan	
85.	18 May 2019	Rakhtveej	Charu Asopa as Kasturi	
86.	19 May 2019	Maricheeka	Nikhil Pandey as Dhananjay, Roshni Sahota as Jhumri	
87.	25 May 2019	Khandit Murti Ki Dahshat	Sana Amin Sheikh as Shalini	
88.	26 May 2019	Kiwaad Bhoot	Meghan Jadhav as Shashwat, Dalip Tahil as Baba	
89.	1 June 2019	Khooni Gudda	Navin Prabhakar as Subodh Chaterjee	
90.	2 June 2019	Rudaaliya	Varun Sharma as Aarav, Ketaki Kadam as Jia	
91.	8 June 2019	Karvachauth	Priyal Gor, Pankaj Singh, Aftab Alam	
92.	9 June 2019	Totka	Rahul Sharma, Patrali Chattopadhyay	
93.	15 June 2019	Bhoot Bangla	Prakruti Mishra as Mathura, Rishi Verma as Akash, Aarthi Thakur as Daisy	
94.	16 June 2019	Gudda	Shamik Abbas as Mahesh, Samikssha Batnagar as Rama, Yashodhan Rana, Viren Vazirani as Bunty, Abbas Ghaznavi	
95.	22 June 2019	Shrapith Bus	Swati Kapoor as Alisha, Samridh Bawa as Suketu, Chirag Desai	
96.	23 June 2019	Kabuda	Lavin Gothi as Rohit, Ishani Sharma as Charu	
97.	29 June 2019	Chipkaal Danav	Nalini Negi as Nandini, Ruslaan Mumtaz as Dev	
98.	30 June 2019	Kaali Zubaan	Drisha Kalyani as Imli	
99.	6 July 2019	Shaitani Ullu	Astha Agarwal as Mohi	
100.	7 July 2019	Tilasmi Almari	Yukti Kapoor as Swetha, Vikram Sakhalkar as Vihaan	
101.	13 July 2019	Gubbarewali	Roshni Sahota as Geeta, Rohit Choudhary as Raghav, Siddharth Dhanda	
102.	14 July 2019	Sarkata Shaitan	Khan Ovais as Tamas	
103.	20 July 2019	Conjoined Twins	Ravi Gossain as Rakesh, Preeti Amin as Pavitra, Drisha Kalyani as Naina	
104.	21 July 2019	Mayavi Behenein	Keertida Mistry as Mehak, Paaras Madaan as Himanshoo	
105.	27 July 2019	Kaid	Prakruti Mishra as Ramya, Ayaz Ahmed as Shekhar, Jaya Ojha as Maa Ji	
106.	28 July 2019	Bichhunni	Sana Amin Sheikh as Bichhunni Krutika Desai as Vaisakhi	
107.	3 August 2019	Naagina	Jyoti Sharma as Shikha	
108.	4 August 2019	Icchadhari Mendhak	Vidhi Pandya as Rani, Saheem Khan as Saurabh, Mehnaz Shroff	
109.	10 August 2019	Jeeva	Kinshuk Mahajan as Suyash, Parvati Sehgal as Yashri	
110.	11 August 2019	Shaitan Ki Aankhe	Abigail Jain as Saniya, Ashish Dixit as Rishabh.	
111.	17 August 2019	Chukabra	Sonal Parihar as Kiran, Amit Varma as Shrey	
112.	18 August 2019	Tilasmi Jeev	Ankita Sharma as Nandita, Shamik Abbas as Manav, Samriddi Yadav as Munni, Siddharth Dhanda	
113.	24 August 2019	Bhookha Bastha	Aalika Sheikh as Laali, Ankita Dubey, Mehnaz Shroff	
114.	24 August 2019	Jhoolewali Dadi	Krutika Desai Khan as Kesar Dadi, Ketaki Kadam as Arshi	
115.	25 August 2019	Katila Shaitan	Farnaz Shetty as Tulsi, Kunal Singh as Sagar, Amit Kapoor as Tulsi's father	
116.	25 August 2019	Bauna Danav	Pooja Sharma as Tanu	
117.	31 August 2019	Nazarbattu	Paaras Madaan as Dr. Vinay, Falaq Naaz as Suman, Pooran Kiri	
118.	31 August 2019	Raat Danav	Neil Bhatt as Vinod, Vaishali Takkar as Juhi	
119.	1 September 2019	Khagraaaz	Ankur Nayyar as ACP Verma, Samar katyaan, Cindrella D'Cruz	
120.	1 September 2019	Shraapit Sasural	Neha Pednekar as Sudha, Ravi Bhatia as Mohit	
121.	7 September 2019	Aadmkhor Bhediya 2hr Mahaepisode Part 1	Kabeer Kumar as Tarun, Lavin Gothi as Virat, Urfi Javed as Komal, Seema Bora	
122.	7 September 2019	Aadmkhor Bhediya 2hr Mahaepisode Part 2	Kabeer Kumar as Tarun, Lavin Gothi as Virat, Urfi Javed as Komal, Seema Bora	
123.	8 September 2019	Mayavi Cheekh Check 2hr Mahaepisode Part 1	Aarna Sharma as Pinky, Avtaar Vaishnavi as Raju, Cindrella D'Cruz	
124.	8 September 2019	Mayavi Cheekh Check 2hr Mahaepisode Part 2	Aarna Sharma as Pinky, Avtaar Vaishnavi as Raju, Cindrella D'Cruz	
125.	14 September 2019	Kankhajura	Nikhil Pandey as Sandeep, Sonali Nikam as Siddhi, Priyal Gor as Karn Pischachini	
126.	14 September 2019	Rahasyamayi Mitti Daitya	Resham Tipnis, Ravi Gossain	
127.	15 September 2019	Ashtabhuji Danav	Aishwarya Khare as Radha, Rohit Bhardwaj as Ranvijay	
128.	15 September 2019	Kaal Ka Jaal	Hetal Gada as Preeti, Muskan Bamne as Seema	
129.	21 September 2019	Barahsingha Danav	Shafaq Naaz as Shreya, Kanwar Dhillon as Rahul	
130.	21 September 2019	Pret Kutumb	Ishani Sharma as Rihaana, Mohit Abrol as Daksh	
131.	22 September 2019	Baanjkara	Rahil Azam as Shyaam, Arina Dey as Veena, Sonakshi Save as Minnie	
132.	22 September 2019	Bidaal Pisachini	Sheen Dass as Shweta, Ankit Gupta, Jay Zaveri	
133.	28 September 2019	Shaitaani Ghadiyaal	Alihassan Turabi as Ayush, Gauri Singh as Suman	
134.	28 September 2019	Girgit	Keerti Nagpure as Meena, Hasan Zaidi, Ram Awana as Maqbool	
135.	29 September 2019	Khar Danav	Aalisha Panwar as Nishta, Naveen Pandita as Sunil, Amit Singh Thakur as Dadaji	
136.	29 September 2019	Kapali	Sheetal Dabholkar as Jaya, Kapil Arya as Gunjar	
137.	5 October 2019	Ardhnaag	Rajeev Bharadwaj as Raghu, Tina Philip as Rukmani	
138.	5 October 2019	Danav Ki Dillagi	Roopal Tyagi as Manisha, Ankit Gupta as Raghav, Shilpa Gandhi as Kanti	
139.	6 October 2019	Jalan Jalani	Ankita Sharma, Samriddhi Yadav as Babli	
140.	6 October 2019	Djinn	Sheena Bajaj as Samiksha, Ashish Dixit as Chandu, Rohit Choudhary as Ranjeet	
141.	12 October 2019	Bhavashyavaani	Alan Kapoor as Mahen, Bhoomika Mirchandani as Ritu, Mona Vasu as Vedana	
142.	12 October 2019	Aadmkhor Bhagnar	Ketaki Kadam as Maya	
143.	13 October 2019	Daayan	Monica Sharma as Varsha, Kinshuk Vaidya as Sanjay	
144.	13 October 2019	Yakshini	Cindrella D'Cruz as Kunti, Jiya Chauhan as Poonam	
145.	19 October 2019	Shermukhi Danvi	Vivana Singh as Danvi	
146.	19 October 2019	Narbhakshi Jangal	Dolly Chawla as Nyonika / Madhubani, Paras Arora as Ranbir	
147.	20 October 2019	Ravula	Aishwarya Raj Bhakuni as Vaidehi, Rahul Sharma as Raghav	
148.	20 October 2019	Icchapoorti Handya	Abigail Jain as Harsha, Pratik Parihar as Raja, Imran Khan as Vaibhav	
149.	2 November 2019	Jhok Danav	Ishita Ganguly as Dr. Arshi, Raj Logani as Vishwas	
150.	2 November 2019	Tilasmi Charkha	Harsha Khandeparkar as Avantika, Rahul Manchanda as Ruhaan	
151.	3 November 2019	Angula Danav	Parvati Sehgal as Sanjana, Aakash Talwar as Shekhar	
152.	3 November 2019	Paatal ke Danav	Sahil Uppal as Nikat, Urvashi Sharma as Parul, Mani Rai	
153.	9 November 2019	Giddug Danav	Deblina Chatterjee as Lokiya, Aniruddh Singh as Birju / Giddug Danav	
154.	9 November 2019	Laakad Danav	Akanksha Juneja as Renu, Ravi Bhatia as Atul, Yash Choudhary as Vinod	
155.	10 November 2019	Mayavi Kitab	Manini Mishra as Ila, Mihir Mishra as Siddharth	
156.	10 November 2019	Kabhuka	Neha Pednekar as Kaveri, Achherr Bhaardwaj as Mukund	
157.	16 November 2019	Zehreeli Kundala	Samikssha Batnagar as Kundala, Khushwant Walia as Somdard, Sonakshi Save as Chandni	
158.	16 November 2019	Samudri Shaitan	Purvi Mundada as Meenu, Puneett Chouksey as Sumit	
159.	17 November 2019	Shikari Kauwa	Kunal Bakshi, Aishwarya Khare as Roshni, Arina Dey as Sonia	
160.	17 November 2019	Pitru Preth	Sonali Nikam as Rupa, Shaleen Malhotra as Manav	
161.	23 November 2019	Khel Kursi Ka	Roop Durgapal as Kajal, Shaleen Malhotra as Uday	
162.	23 November 2019	Siddhak Ka Shrap	Zalak Desai as Chaaya, Parichay Sharma as Abhay	
163.	24 November 2019	Preth Pari	Vindhya Tiwari as Nisha, Ankur Nayyar as Randhir	
164.	24 November 2019	Kathil Koyal	Tina Philip as Bhavana, Richa Dixit as Radhika, Kabeer Kumar as Ravi	
165.	30 November 2019	Khooni Gudda	Tanya Sharma as Anvesha, Mukul Raj Singh as Nandu	
166.	30 November 2019	Kiraay Ka Rakshas	Ravi Gossain as Bhushan	
167.	1 December 2019	Mayavi Jaal Vikram aur Betaal	Gaurav Khanna as Raghav, Rajkumar Kanojia as Betaal	
168.	1 December 2019	Mukhauta	Asawari Joshi as Dadi, Kashvi Kothari as Kavya	
169.	7 December 2019	Ashwa Danav	Chahat Pandey as Jhanvi, Shardul Pandit as Sambhav	
170.	7 December 2019	Carbon Copy	Piyali Munshi as Pooja, Nikhil Pandey as Himanshu	
171.	8 December 2019	Khooni Panja	Khushboo Tawde as Meera, Dishank Arora as Sidharth, Amit K Singh as Tiger	
172.	8 December 2019	Pishach Darji	Rishi Verma as Jagan	
173.	14 December 2019	Saya Saree Ka	Geetanjali Mishra as Sudha, Ravi Gossain as Mishra Ji, Zuber K. Khan as Himanshu	
174.	14 December 2019	Khooni Mahbooba	Lavina Tandon as Mehbooba, Jatin Shah as Ranjeet	
175.	15 December 2019	Guldar	Anshul Pandey as Gul, Dolly Chawla as Mala	
176.	15 December 2019	Narakasur	Amit Behl as Uncle, Dolphin Dwivedi as Sweetie, Anchal Sahu as Christie	
177.	21 December 2019	Rasayanik Rakshas	as Arvind	
178.	21 December 2019	Jaadui Jhoote	Ishani Sharma as Sanya, Srishti Jain as Yami	
179.	22 December 2019	Daravani Parikatha	Kinshuk Vaidya as Prince, Shagun Sharma as Satya	
180.	22 December 2019	Rooh Pishachni	Ankit Gupta as Surya, Keerti Nagpure as Radha	
181.	28 December 2019	Parchhayi	Ashish Dixit as Manishankar, Garima Jain as Urvashi	
182.	28 December 2019	Naag Danav	Neha Pednekar as Malan, Kabeer Kumar as Nagesh, Neetu Pandey as Girija	
183.	29 December 2019	Sehri Ka Pedh	Ketaki Kadam as Revati	
184.	29 December 2019	Bhavishya Danav		
185.	4 January 2020	3 km Ka Ghoofa		
186.	4 January 2020	Makra	Alan Kapoor, Roshni Sahota	
187.	5 January 2020	Tilasmi Nagina	Pankit Thakker, Shivani Gosain	
188.	5 January 2020	Rooh Ka Lutera	Rishi Khurana, Arina Dey, Krishnakant Singh Bundela	
189.	11 January 2020	Ballal	Lavin Gothi as Vansh, Viren Singh Rathore as Ballal	
190.	11 January 2020	Katha Pret	Ravi Gossain	
191.	12 January 2020	Avinash Mukherjee, Preeti Amin		
192.	12 January 2020	12 January 2020	Ankit Arora	
193.	18 January 2020	12 January 2020	Highway 21	Kunal Bakshi
194.	18 January 2020	Vanraja	Ayush Anand as Girish, Utkarsha Naik as Girish's mother, Rajat Sharma as Varun (Girish's friend)	
195.	19 January 2020	Jakata Ka Khazana	Parichay Sharma, Cindrella D' Cruz	
196.	19 January 2020	Angariya	Rajeev Kumar as Manohar, Ankita Dubey, Veena Kapoor	
197.	25 January 2020	Shaitaani Chata	Puneet Vashisht, Anaya Shivan	
198.	25 January 2020	Tidda Danav Aur Chitirani Ka Aatank		
199.	26 January 2020	Chandra Pishach	Yash Sinha, Chahat Pandey	
200.	26 January 2020	Jadwa Danav	Sonal Vengurlekar	
201.	1 February 2020	Tilismi Tohfa	Gaurav Khanna as Jaggu	
202.	1 February 2020	Patal Danav	Ishaan Singh Manhas as Ranvijay, Roop Durgapal as Sonia, Ram Awana	
203.	2 February 2020	Vritara Danav	Varun Sharma, Aishwarya Khare	
204.	2 February 2020	Zehreela Mayajaal	Preetika Chauhan as Avni	
205.	8 February 2020	Kunva	Priyal Gor	
206.	8 February 2020	Sinduriya Sindoor Danav	Sudeep Sarangi, Sudeepti Parmar	
207.	9 February 2020	Bima Danav	Ravi Gossain as Bhanu Rai	
208.	9 February 2020	Nagarvadhu	Ashish Dixit as Madhav / Veerbhadra, Neha Pednekar	
209.	15 February 2020	Grih Pravesh	Iqbal Azad	
210.	15 February 2020	Pisachini Aur Kankhajuri	Richa Pallod, Vikram Rathod	
211.	16 February 2020	Yeti		
212.	16 February 2020	Giddhni Ka Mayajaal	Rupa Divetia	
213.	22 February 2020	Golva	Neil Bhatt, Shagun Sharma	
214.	22 February 2020	Jal Rakshas	Fenil Umrigar, Yash Gera	
215.	23 February 2020	Maut Ka Geet	Arup Pal, Ashwin Kaushal, Himanshu Chhabra As 1st victim, Sakib Khan as 2nd victim (MTV Roadies Revolution)	
216.	23 February 2020	Damyanti Ka Dera	Kajol Srivastav as Charu	
217.	29 February 2020	Betaal Vivaah	Rashmi Gupta, Meer Ali, Senaya Sharma	
218.	29 February 2020	Chatkora Danav	Garima Parihar, Khushwant Walia	
219.	1 March 2020	Chamgadar Pret	Jiya Shankar as Suhani, Kabir Kumar as Roop Singh, Jaywant Patekar	
220.	1 March 2020	Jinn Aur Itra	Arina Dey, Pooran Kiri as Mushtaq, Raju Shrestha	
221.	7 March 2020	Zulekha	Alan Kapoor, Aditi Rawat	
222.	7 March 2020	English Cat	Patrali Chattopadhyay	
223.	8 March 2020	Kark Danav	Chahat Pandey as Paneeri, Harsha Gupte as Gomti	
224.	8 March 2020	Nishachari	Yashodhan Bal	
225.	14 March 2020	Dayan Dadi	Imran Khan, Parvati Sehgal as Suman	
226.	14 March 2020	Shakhi and Patali's trap	Dolly Chawla as Alisha, Yash Pandit as Viyaan	
227.	15 March 2020	Bahuriya Ki Holi	Dolly Chawla as Tesu, Mithil Jain as Anand	
228.	15 March 2020	Preton Ki Toli Khele Holi	Arina Dey, Armaan Tahil	
229.	21 March 2020	Bel Pishchasani	Sunayana Fozdar as Vrinda	
230.	22 March 2020	Kalraj ki Kahar	Sunita Shirole as Nani	
231.	26 September 2020	Kuku Danav	Raju Shrestha, Kenneth Desai	
232.	26 September 2020	Jhole Mein Jinnat	Vaishnavi Dhanraj	
233.	27 September 2020	Rahasyamayi Camera	Tina Ann Philip, Mohit Abrol Rahim Abdullah || Ahmad Harhash	

== See also ==
- List of Hindi horror shows
