= Devi (TV series) =

- Directed by: Anant Mahadevan; Ravi Raj
- Starring: See below
- Music by: Abhijeet Hegdepatil
- Opening theme: "Devi"
- Country of origin: India
- Original language: Hindi
- No. of episodes: 118

Production
- Producers: Ajay Devgan (2002-2004); Sujit Kumar Singh (2004); Misha Gautam
- Running time: 22-42 min.
- Production companies: Devgan Software (2002-2004); Shreya Creations (2004); Television Foot Prints

Original release
- Network: Sony Entertainment Television
- Release: 20 September 2002 – 22 December 2004

Devi (transl. Goddess) is an Indian television series which aired on Sony TV from 20 September 2002 to 22 December 2004. It was produced by Ajay Devgan's production house Devgan Software from 2002 to 2003 in association with misha gautam, later changed to Sujit Kumar Singh's production house Shreya Creations in the second year of the show in association with Misha Gautam's production house Television Foot Prints.

== Plot ==
The story revolves around Gayatri, an orphan who believes in Goddess Durga and lives with her kind-hearted uncle, evil aunt and evil husband Vikram.

== Cast ==
- Sakshi Tanwar as
  - Gayatri Vikram Sharma: Vikram's wife; Kailashnath and Revati's daughter in law, an orphan who firmly believes on Goddess Durga. She marries Vikram Sharma, a spoiled brat who refuses to accept her as his wife and kills her with the help of his brother-in-law Vasu
  - Devi Parvati
- Juhi Parmar as Kalika Shastri / Kalika Raj Malhotra Vikram's wife
- Mohnish Behl as Vikram Sharma
- Manish Goel as Advocate Raj Malhotra
- Madhoo as Devi Parvati
- Rajesh Khera as Vasudev Kumar
- Reena Kapoor as Kavita Sharma / Kavita Vasudev Kumar / Gayatri's elder sister-in-law
- Kiran Dubey as Urvashi Tandon / Fake Gayatri
- Anjana Mumtaz as Revati Sharma / Maa Ji
- Rakesh Pandey as Kailashnath Sharma / Babu Ji
- Ankit Shah as Bhola
- Aman Verma as Vasudev Kumar
- Rushad Rana as Gautam Mehra
- Lata Sabharwal as Kavita Sharma / Kavita Vasudev Kumar / Gayatri's elder sister-in-law
- Shabnam Mishra / Tasneem Khan as Pooja Sharma
- Renuka Israni as Santo Sharma / Bua Ji
- Vandita Vasa as Aparna Singh (Gayatri's friend)
- Supriya Karnik as Kamini Satyen Kapoor / Mami Ji
- Prithvi Zutshi as Satyen Kapoor / Mama Ji
- Raymon Singh as Radhika Shastri
- Karishma Randhawa as Sonika Shastri
- Siraj Mustafa Khan as Bhramesh
- Sooraj Thapar as Agnivesh
- Alyy Khan as Rudraksh
- Nirmal Pandey as Markesh
- Rohini Hattangadi as Mrs. Malhotra
- Puneet Vashisht as Rohit Mehra
- Chand Dhar as Guruji
- Naresh Suri as Police Commissioner Krishnakant
- Aayam Mehta as Johnny
- Dharmesh Vyas as Lallan / Mama Ji
- Manish Khanna as Advocate Kriplani
- Malini Kapoor as Deepa
- Govind Khatri as Advocate Desai
- Shiva Rindani as Raj Chhabria
- Kamal Malik as Mr. Shetty
- Vishal Thakkar as Guruji's disciple
- Rohan Ghag as Akshay Kumar, Vasu and Kavita's son
- Nilofer Khan as Mallika Kapoor
- Aanchal Anand as Rupali Kapoor
- Hemant Choudhary as Inspector K. Mohammad
- Yashodhan Bal as Inspector A. R. Bhatt
- Sudhir Dalvi as Gaurishankar Shastri
- Meera Vasudevan as Uma
