= Bihu Attack =

Indian thriller film

- Theatrical release poster
- Directed by: Suzad Iqbal Khan
- Screenplay by: Suzad Iqbal Khan
- Story by: Suzad Iqbal Khan
- Produced by: Prabir Kanta Saha; Dev Menaria
- Starring: Dev Menaria; Arbaaz Khan; Daisy Shah; Rahul Dev; Raza Murad; Yukti Kapoor
- Cinematography: Leela Mohan Shetty
- Edited by: Shailendra Kumar
- Music by: Biswajit Bhattacharjee
- Production company: PKS Films Production House
- Release date: 16 January 2026
- Country: India
- Language: Hindi

Bihu Attack is a 2026 Indian Hindi-language action drama film directed by Suzad Iqbal Khan and produced by Prabir Kanta Saha and Dev Menaria. The film stars Dev Menaria, Arbaaz Khan, Daisy Shah, Rahul Dev, Raza Murad, Yukti Kapoor, Hiten Tejwani, Mir Sarwar, Dimpu Baruah, and Amiee Misobbah in prominent roles. It was released in theatres on 16 January 2026.

== Plot ==
The film follows Raj Kunwar, a widowed court marshal from Assam who believes in education and social integration as instruments for long-term peace. During the Bihu festival celebrations, a major security threat emerges coinciding with the visit of India's Defence Minister. As tensions escalate, Raj Kunwar teams up with former intelligence officer KD Sir to avert the impending attack and uncover the forces behind the conspiracy.

== Cast ==
- Dev Menaria
- Daisy Shah
- Arbaaz Khan
- Rahul Dev
- Raza Murad
- Yukti Kapoor
- Hiten Tejwani
- Mir Sarwar
- Mubeen Saudagar
- Amiee Misobba
- Dimpu Boruah
- Pinky Sarma
- Mamta Kamble
- Zain Ullah
- Jeet Raidutt
- Amit Lakheani

== Reception ==
Abhishek Srivastava of Times of India said that “Bihu Attack is one of those films that feels familiar from the very first frame, and not in a good way.” Vinamra Mathur of Firstpost said that “Bihu Attack is a sincere movie because of its subject and honest approach, and it is much more than a thriller movie, as it aims to provide a social message to its audience by stating that education, talk, and social inclusion are very important tools to overcome extremisms.”
