= Jugni Chali Jalandhar =

- Promotional logo
- Written by: Raghuveer Shekhawat; Amit Senchoudhary; S. Farhan; Nitin Keswwani; Vinay Choudary
- Directed by: Pawan Parkhii; Jeetu Arora
- Starring: See below
- Theme music composer: Abhijeet Hegdepatil
- Country of origin: India
- Original language: Hindi
- No. of seasons: 1
- No. of episodes: 330

Production
- Camera setup: Multi-camera
- Running time: 24 minutes
- Production company: DJ's A Creative Unit

Original release
- Network: SAB TV
- Release: 29 September 2008 – 13 May 2010

Jugni Chali Jalandhar (transl. Jugni goes to Jalandhar) is an Indian television comedy series that premiered on 29 September 2008 on Sony SAB.

== Plot ==
Jugni Chali Jalandhar is the story of the trials and tribulations of a girl who is madly in love with a man from her college and will face any ordeal for him. Jasmeet, who is born and brought up in London, is a doctor. Sweet, stylish, modern, cultured and well-educated 'Jazz' falls for 'Vicky', who belongs to Gen 'Y' but is a Punjabi munda at heart. Although they love each other dearly, Vicky knows his father will never accept an educated girl as his 'Bahu', so he leaves Jasmeet in London and comes back to his native village Jagtariya in Jalandhar, Punjab. Since Jasmeet knows that the only way she can marry Vicky is by pleasing his father, she goes to Jagtariya. Here unfortunately she bumps into her "father-in-law", who fumes at her when she throws at him a pound and runs away. He sends his sons to get the 'Firangan' (foreigner) and vows to settle scores with her. When Vicky finds out that the Firangan is none other than Jasmeet, he somehow manages to save her from his brothers and asks her to go back. A disappointed Jasmeet was about to leave Jagtariya when she meets a woman with whom she shares her sorrow.

To her surprise, the woman turns out to be Vicky's mother who agrees to help her. She trains her to be like a villager and teaches her how to do household chores. Thus, she transforms from Dr. Jasmeet to Jugni, a simple, uneducated village girl who strongly believes in the values taught to her by her father, such as having her face covered in front of men. Without the knowledge of Vicky and with the help of Rajrani she enters 'Bhalla Nivas', impresses Jagtaar Bhalla by completing all the tasks assigned by him to ten prospective brides for his son, and ultimately succeeds in marrying her lover. Gurpal, a fellow villager who desperately wants his daughter Preeto to marry Vicky, to acquire the property of Bhallas, tries his best to stop the marriage and even after the marriage, in the name of 'abshagun ka tod', throws impossible challenges at the newlyweds, which they complete bravely. On their wedding night Vicky learns that Jugni is Jasmeet and is baffled thinking about how he will face his father when he learns the truth. He refuses to give Jugni the rights of being his wife until and unless his father accepts her as Dr. Jasmeet Lamba. Brave that she is, Jugni accepts his word. Vicky gives her ten tasks and tells her that she will accept that she is worthy of staying in Jagtariya after she completes each of those tasks. Jugni completes those tasks and manages to become the sweetheart of the family because of her nature.

In this pursuit, she does things which she had never dreamt of before, like cooking for 10–15 people, working in the fields, etc. Her troubles do not end here, with one problem approaching her after another. Though he refuses to acknowledge his love for her, Vicky helps her to come out of each problem. Though he continues to fight with her, he secretly knows that none except Jugni has the potential to solve the family's problems. Jugni and Vicky face each hurdle together, be it dealing with the notorious Gurpal and Preeto, saving their land, and transforming the mischievous children Bunty and Bubbly into good ones, Jugni and Vicky somehow succeed. Several people (Jiya, Vicky's buaji, his eldest parjaiji, Samarjit, Gattu - The Thief) have come to know about Jugni's medical background, yet they accept her, since they know she did all this for Vicky and they've seen her caring for his family.

When Jugni's parents visit her on her first anniversary, they are surprised that Vicky has not given Jugni the rights of being his wife. They plan to take their daughter back to London, but Vicky manages to prove his love for Jugni and before they leave, her parents are satisfied and believe that eventually everyone will accept their daughter. Despite all the difficulties it presents her, life is a blessing for Jugni, since Vicky is with her. The show ends with everyone accepting Jugni after the truth is revealed.

== Cast ==
- Muskaan Mihani as Dr. Jasmeet Lamba/Jugni Bhalla
- Karan Godhwani as Vikramjit 'Vicky' Bhalla
- Ranjeet as Jagtaar Bhalla
- Asha Sachdev as RajRani Bhalla
- Baba Sehgal as Balwinder Bhalla
- Sonia Kapoor as Manjeet Bhalla
- Abhishek Avasthi as Maninder Bhalla
- Shilpa Vadke as Surjeet Bhalla
- Rohan as Jatinder 'Jatti' Bhalla
- Namrata Ramsay as Simran 'Simmo' Bhalla
- Ram Kiran as Jeeta
- Poonam Gulati as Preeto
- Raju Kher as Jugni's father
- Roma Navani as Jugni's mother
- Pooja Pihal as Jugni's sister
- Simple Kaul as Jiya
- Shagufta Ali as Buaji
- Shobha Khote as Bebe
