= Pushkar Goggiaa =

Indian television actor

- Born: India
- Occupation: Actor
- Years active: 2011–present

Pushkar Gogia is an Indian Television Actor, Numerologist, Astrologer and Vastu expert. He started his career in television with a cameo role in Anamika on Sony TV where he played the role of Anand Kumar. After being recognised, he got the break with Balaji Telefilms to play the role of Nakul in a mythological serial named Dharmakshetra which was aired on Epic Channel. Last seen with Rashmi Sharma Telefilm's launched daily soap Desh Ki Beti Nandini portraying the character of Siddharth Pandey, Nandini's Brother. His role was very well recognized and much appreciated.

== Personal life ==
Gogia was born in a business family of Delhi. He has one younger brother. He took up higher studies and completed his MBA from Indian Institute of Planning and Management, New Delhi. He worked with a private bank for a year and then decided to try his hand at acting.

== Career ==
Goggiaa had undergone formal training for his acting. He has undertaken various modeling assignments for brands like Axis Bank, Uninor, Toyota, Omaxe, Raja Biscuits, IPL, etc. He was also seen in Bajaj Platina Electric Start TV Commercial.

In South industry, he has worked for brands like Vasanth & Co and Sree Kumar Thangamaligaie.

Goggiaa is a professional numerologist and vastu expert. He runs a consultancy where he provides consultations for numerology, astrology and vastu.

== Filmography ==
Year(s)	Film	Role	Notes
2014	Singham Returns	Song Track - "Kuch Toh Hua hai"	
2014	I Promise You	Varun	

== Television ==
Year(s)	Title	Role	Channel	Ref(s)
2013	Anamika	Anand Kumar	Sony	
2013	Dharmakshetra	Krishna	Epic TV	
2013	Desh Ki Beti Nandini	Siddharth Pandey	Sony	
2014	Tumhari Pakhi	Prithvi(Fake Rohan)	Life OK	

== Other episodic shows ==
Year(s)	Title	Role	Channel	Ref(s)
2015	Savdhaan India	Various Roles	Life Ok	
2015	Aahat Season 6	Rahul	SONY	
