= Khidki =

Indian television series

- Genre: Comedy
- Created by: SAB TV
- Directed by: Umesh Shukla
- Presented by: Jamnadas Majethia; Rakul Preet Singh
- Starring: See below
- Opening theme: "Khidki...Khidki"
- Country of origin: India
- Original language: Hindi
- No. of seasons: 1
- No. of episodes: 120

Production
- Producers: R. B. Choudary; Allu Aravind; Nagarjuna
- Running time: 40 min
- Production companies: Super Good Films; Geetha Arts; Annapurna Studios

Original release
- Network: SAB TV
- Release: 28 June – 12 December 2016

Khidki: Humari Funny Kahani (transl. Window: our funny story) is an Indian Hindi language mini-series produced by Hats Off Production. The show premiered on 28 June 2016 and is based on users who tweet their funny stories in 140 characters on Twitter. The casting director is Vineeth Pandey.

== Stories ==
Story no.	Story name	Based on / plot	Cast	Running dates
1	Anju Ki Shaadi	Dwarka Ashok Thakkar's real family story	Aishwarya Sakhuja, Lubna Salim, Rajeev Mehta, Anshul Trivedi	28 June 2016 – 4 July 2016
2	Govinda Govinda	Hyderabad Lalita Swami's real life story	Sarita Joshi, Deepali Pansare, Shraddha Musale, Prem Gadhavi	5 July 2016 – 12 July 2016
3	Tiffin Chor	Meerut Aloknath Tripathi's real life story (Akshay Dhiman)		13 July 2016 – 20 July 2016
4	Guru Dakshina	Mumbai Pandit Satish Pradhan's real life story	Sandeep Kulkarni, Kishori Godbole, Jaywant Wadkar	20 July 2016 – 26 July 2016
5	Mangal Sen ke Prem Patra	Haridwar Mangal Sen's real love story		27 July 2016 – 29 July 2016
6	Kya Karain Kya na Karain?	Ahmedabad Professor Hasmukh Jobanputra's real life experience		1 August 2016 – 8 August 2016
7	1947 Ki Baat Hai	Gujarat Revolutionary Prabhakar Pandey's real life story		9 August 2016 – 15 August 2016
8	Kanghi Ne Mila Di Jodi	Punjab Balvinder Khanna's real life story		16 August 2016 – 21 August 2016
9	Channo Bhaag Gayi	Mumbai Ranveer Saini's real life story		21 August 2016 – 26 August 2016
10	4 Idiots	Sagar 4 Crazy friend's real life story		29 August 2016 – 1 September 2016
11	Bhulakkad	Hyderabad Chaitanya Kumar's real life story		2 September 2016 – 8 September 2016
12	Gang Of Ganesh	Mumbai Toofaan gang's real life story		9 September 2016 – 12 September 2016
13	Bhootani Bani Mehmaan	Gujarat Ramanik Jariala's real life story	JD Majethia, Simran Kaur Hundal	13 September 2016 – 19 September 2016
14	Har Ek Friend Namuna Hotha Hai	Surat Prem and Raju's real life story	Shivshakti Sachdev	20 September 2016 – 26 September 2016
15	Hum Sath Sath Hain	Jalandhar Kiran and Simran's real life story	Chandni Bhagwanani, Sheena Bajaj, Vishal Bhardwaj (actor)	27 September 2016 – 7 October 2016
16	9 Saal Ki Dadi Maa		Sarita Joshi, Shailesh Gulabani, Astha Agarwal, Dhruvee Haldankar	10 October 2016 – 19 October 2016
17	Bhoot Bangla	Society Kids exposes fake Currency Note Racket	Shraddha Musale as Chudail	20 October 2016 – 26 October 2016
18	Krishna bana jadugar			28 October 2016 – 4 November 2016
19	ghadee padi bhari			7 November 2016 – 10 November 2016
20	Aao Wish Kare			11 November 2016 – 18 November 2016
21	Gadbad Ghotala			21 November 2016 – 24 November 2016
22	Note ki Chot			25 November 2016 – 2 December 2016
23	Ghar Na Ho To Aisa			5 December 2016 – 12 December 2016

== Cast ==
- Jamnadas Majethia as Host
- Aishwarya Sakhuja as Anju (Story no. 1 – Anju Ki Shaadi)
- Rajeev Mehta as Ashok Thakkar (Ep1)
- Lubna Salim as Jyoti Thakkar in Ep1
- Sarita Joshi as Lalita Swami in Ep2 and in Ep9 saal ki daadi maa as Dadi Maa
- Abraam Pandey as Amir
- Astha Agarwal
- Shraddha Musale as Bhanupriya (Story no. 2 – Govinda Govinda), as Chudail (Story no. 17 – Bhoot Bangla)
- Deepali Pansare as Shanti (in Story no. 2 – Govinda Govinda)
- Simran Kaur Hundal as Ghost (in Story no. 13 - Bhootani Bani Mehmaan)
- Shivshakti Sachdev as Disha (in Story no.14 - Har Ek Friend Namuna Hotha Hai)
- Kishori Godbole in Guru Daxina
- Arvind Vaidya as Jamnadas's father in Ep-Bhoot Bangla and in one more episode (in two episodic stories)
- Jamnadas Majethia
- Manav Gohil
- Krishna Bharadwaj
- Sarita Sharma
- Jay Saumik Joshi
- Shriya Popat
- Prasad Barve
- Punit Talreja
- Ajay Chaudhary
- Sheena Bajaj as Simran (Story no. 15 – Hum Sath Sath Hain)
- Chandni Bhagwanani as Kiran (Story no. 15 – Hum Sath Sath Hain)
- Vishal Bhardwaj as Vikram (Story no. 15 – Hum Sath Sath Hain)
- Falguni Rajani
- Rahul Rudra Singh as Sudhir (Story - 1947 ki baat hai)
- Sushmita Mukherjee
- Ketki Dave
- Devender Chaudhury
- Suchita Trivedi
- Supriya Pathak
- Mehul Buch

== List of episodes ==
Episode no.	Date	Story
1	28 June 2016	Anju Ki Shaadi
2	29 June 2016	Anju Ki Shaadi
3	30 June 2016	Anju Ki Shaadi
4	1 July 2016	Anju Ki Shaadi
5	4 July 2016	Anju Ki Shaadi
6	5 July 2016	Govinda Govinda
7	6 July 2016	Govinda Govinda
8	7 July 2016	Govinda Govinda
9	8 July 2016	Govinda Govinda
10	11 July 2016	Govinda Govinda
11	12 July 2016	Govinda Govinda
12	13 July 2016	Tiffin Chor
13	14 July 2016	Tiffin Chor
14	15 July 2016	Tiffin Chor
15	18 July 2016	Tiffin Chor
16	19 July 2016	Tiffin Chor
17	20 July 2016	Tiffin Chor
18	21 July 2016	Guru Dakshina
19	22 July 2016	Guru Dakshina
20	25 July 2016	Guru Dakshina
21	26 July 2016	Guru Dakshina
22	27 July 2016	Mangal Sen ke Prem Patra
23	28 July 2016	Mangal Sen ke Prem Patra
24	29 July 2016	Mangal Sen ke Prem Patra
25	1 August 2016	Kya Karain Kya na Karain?
26	2 August 2016	Kya Karain Kya na Karain?
27	3 August 2016	Kya Karain Kya na Karain?
28	4 August 2016	Kya Karain Kya na Karain?
29	5 August 2016	Kya Karain Kya na Karain?
30	8 August 2016	Kya Karain Kya na Karain?
31	9 August 2016	1947 Ki Baat Hai
32	10 August 2016	1947 Ki Baat Hai
33	11 August 2016	1947 Ki Baat Hai
34	12 August 2016	1947 Ki Baat Hai
35	15 August 2016	1947 Ki Baat Hai
36	16 August 2016	Kanghi Ne Mila Di Jodi
37	17 August 2016	Kanghi Ne Mila Di Jodi
38	18 August 2016	Kanghi Ne Mila Di Jodi
39	19 August 2016	Kanghi Ne Mila Di Jodi
40	22 August 2016	Channo Bhaag Gayi
41	23 August 2016	Channo Bhaag Gayi
42	24 August 2016	Channo Bhaag Gayi
43	25 August 2016	Channo Bhaag Gayi
44	26 August 2016	Channo Bhaag Gayi
45	29 August 2016	4 Idiots
46	30 August 2016	4 Idiots
47	31 August 2016	4 Idiots
48	1 September 2016	4 Idiots
49	2 September 2016	Bhulakkad
50	5 September 2016	Bhulakkad
51	6 September 2016	Bhulakkad
52	7 September 2016	Bhulakkad
53	8 September 2016	Bhulakkad
54	9 September 2016	Gang of Ganesh
55	10 September 2016	Gang of Ganesh
56	12 September 2016	Gang of Ganesh
57	13 September 2016	Bhootani Bani Mehmaan
58	14 September 2016	Bhootani Bani Mehmaan
59	15 September 2016	Bhootani Bani Mehmaan
60	16 September 2016	Bhootani Bani Mehmaan
61	19 September 2016	Bhootani Bani Mehmaan
62	20 September 2016	Har Ek Friend Namuna Hotha Hai
63	21 September 2016	Har Ek Friend Namuna Hotha Hai
64	22 September 2016	Har Ek Friend Namuna Hotha Hai
65	23 September 2016	Har Ek Friend Namuna Hotha Hai
66	26 September 2016	Har Ek Friend Namuna Hotha Hai
67	27 September 2016	Hum Saath Saath Hain
68	28 September 2016	Hum Saath Saath Hain
69	29 September 2016	Hum Saath Saath Hain
70	30 September 2016	Hum Saath Saath Hain
71	3 October 2016	Hum Saath Saath Hain
72	4 October 2016	Hum Saath Saath Hain
73	5 October 2016	Hum Saath Saath Hain
74	6 October 2016	Hum Saath Saath Hain
75	7 October 2016	Hum Saath Saath Hain
76	10 October 2016	9 Saal Ki Dadi Maa
77	11 October 2016	9 Saal Ki Dadi Maa
78	12 October 2016	9 Saal Ki Dadi Maa
79	13 October 2016	9 Saal Ki Dadi Maa
80	14 October 2016	9 Saal Ki Dadi Maa
81	17 October 2016	9 Saal Ki Dadi Maa
82	18 October 2016	9 Saal Ki Dadi Maa
83	19 October 2016	9 Saal Ki Dadi Maa
84	20 October 2016	Bhoot Bangla
85	21 October 2016	Bhoot Bangla
86	24 October 2016	Bhoot Bangla
87	25 October 2016	Bhoot Bangla
88	26 October 2016	Bhoot Bangla
89	28 October 2016	Krishna bana jadugar
90	31 October 2016	Krishna bana jadugar
91	1 November 2016	Krishna bana jadugar
92	2 November 2016	Krishna bana jadugar
93	3 November 2016	Krishna bana jadugar
94	4 November 2016	Krishna bana jadugar
95	7 November 2016	ghadee padi bhari
96	8 November 2016	ghadee padi bhari
97	9 November 2016	ghadee padi bhari
98	10 November 2016	ghadee padi bhari
99	11 November 2016	Aao Wish Kare
100	14 November 2016	Aao Wish Kare
101	15 November 2016	Aao Wish Kare
102	16 November 2016	Aao Wish Kare
103	17 November 2016	Aao Wish Kare
104	18 November 2016	Aao Wish Kare
105	21 November 2016	Gadbad Ghotala
106	22 November 2016	Gadbad Ghotala
107	23 November 2016	Gadbad Ghotala
108	24 November 2016	Gadbad Ghotala
109	25 November 2016	Note ki Chot
110	28 November 2016	Note ki Chot
111	29 November 2016	Note ki Chot
112	30 November 2016	Note ki Chot
113	1 December 2016	Note ki Chot
114	2 December 2016	Note ki Chot
115	5 December 2016	Ghar Na Ho Toh Aisa
116	6 December 2016	Ghar Na Ho Toh Aisa
117	7 December 2016	Ghar Na Ho Toh Aisa
118	8 December 2016	Ghar Na Ho Toh Aisa
119	9 December 2016	Ghar Na Ho Toh Aisa
120	12 December 2016	Ghar Na Ho Toh Aisa
