= Roopal Tyagi =

Indian television actress

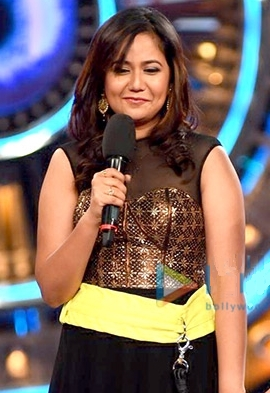
- Tyagi in Bigg Boss 9 grand premiere, 2015
- Born: 6 October 1989 (age 37); Bangalore, Karnataka, India
- Occupations: Actor, choreographer
- Years active: 2007–present
- Known for: Ek Nayi Chhoti Si Zindagi, Sapne Suhane Ladakpan Ke, Bigg Boss 9
- Spouse: Nomish Bhardwaj (m. 2025)
- Awards: Zee Rishtey Award for Favorite Behen and Favorite Nayi Jodi

Roopal Tyagi (born 6 October 1989) is an Indian choreographer, and actress who mainly works in Hindi television. She is known for playing Gunjan in the Zee TV's drama series Sapne Suhane Ladakpan Ke. She later participated in dance reality show Jhalak Dikhhla Jaa Season 8 and Bigg Boss Season 9 in 2015.

== Early life ==
Tyagi was born on October 6, 1989, in Bangalore, India. She has done her education at Sophia High School, Bangalore. She trained at Shiamak Davar's dance institute Bangalore, her hometown, after which she got an opportunity to assist Pony Verma, a Bollywood choreographer in the song "Mere Dholna" from the movie Bhool Bhulaiyaa. For two years, she shuttled between Bangalore and Mumbai before she finally settled in Mumbai.

== Career ==
Roopal started her career as a choreographer in 2007. After starting her acting career with the role of Mansha in Hamari Betiyoon Ka Vivaah, she appeared in Ek Nayi Chhoti Si Zindagi.

She played Gunjan in the Indian soap opera Sapne Suhane Ladakpan Ke. Roopal participated in the eighth season of Jhalak Dikhhla Jaa as a wildcard entrant but was eliminated after a week. She was a contestant in Bigg Boss 9, in which she was paired up with Digangana Suryavanshi and was eliminated in the second week of voting.

In 2012, Tyagi won two Zee Rishtey Awards for Favourite Behen as Gunjan and Rachana (Mahima Makwana), and Favourite Nayi Jodi as Gunjan and Mayank (Ankit Gera). In 2013, she was nominated in the Indian Telly Awards for Fresh New Face as Gunjan.

Tyagi wrote an open letter to her Instagram in 2020, where she criticized the Indian contingent for undermining the main female character and the "backwardness" of the series. "You think you are making a drama about a 'black' skin girl, a 'short' girl, a 'fat' girl, etc. and the problem they are having, and calling it a progressive show. No" she said to the producers.

== Personal life ==
Tyagi dated actor Ankit Gera from 2013 to 2014. In December 2025, she tied knot with animation professional Nomish Bhardwaj in an intimate Hindu wedding ceremony held in Mumbai.

== Filmography ==
=== Television ===
Year	Name	Role	Notes	Ref(s)
2007	Kasamh Se	Ria	Cameo	
2008–2009	Hamari Betiyoon Ka Vivaah	Mansha Kohil		
2009	Dill Mill Gaye	Pari		
2010	Karamyudh	Pallavi Chauhan		
2010	Jhalak Dikhhla Jaa 4	Guest	Week 2, Special appearance	
2011–2012	Ek Nayi Chhoti Si Zindagi	Kuhu	Lead role	
2012	Dance India Dance Li'l Masters 2	Competitor		
2012–2015	Sapne Suhane Ladakpan Ke	Gunjan Mayank Garg	Lead role	
2013	Qubool Hai	Guest (as Gunjan)	Along with Ankit Gera	
2014	Ek Mutthi Aasmaan	Guest (as Gunjan)	Crossover with SSLP	
2015	Killerr Karaoke Atka Toh Latkah	Contestant	Along with Vishal Singh	
2015	Jhalak Dikhhla Jaa 8	Contestant	(entered as wild card) – Eliminated 10th week – (7th place)	
2015	Bigg Boss 9	Contestant	Evicted Day 14 (19th place)	
2016	Box Cricket League	Contestant	Player in Pune Anmol Ratn	
2016	Fakebook with Kavita	Guest	Hosted by Kavita Kaushik	
2019	Shakti - Astitva Ke Ehsaas Ki	Manasvi	Supporting role	
2019	Laal Ishq	Manisha	Episode 138 opposite Ankit Gupta	
2021	Ranju Ki Betiyaan	Bulbul Ranju Mishra	Lead role	

=== Film ===
- 2007: Bhool Bhulaiya – Mere Dolna

== Awards and nominations ==
Year	Award	Category	Show	Result
2012	Zee Rishtey Awards	Favourite Behen	Sapne Suhane Ladakpan Ke	Won
2012	Zee Rishtey Awards	Favourite Nayi Jodi	Sapne Suhane Ladakpan Ke	Won
2012	Zee Rishtey Awards	Favourite Jodi	Sapne Suhane Ladakpan Ke	Nominated
2012	Zee Rishtey Awards	Favourite Naya Sadasya – Female	Sapne Suhane Ladakpan Ke	Nominated
2012	Indian Telly Awards	Best Fresh New Face – Female	Sapne Suhane Ladakpan Ke	Nominated
2013	Indian Telly Awards	Fresh New Face	Sapne Suhane Ladakpan Ke	Nominated
2013	Zee Rishtey Awards	Favourite Behen	Sapne Suhane Ladakpan Ke	Won
2013	Zee Rishtey Awards	Favourite Jodi	Sapne Suhane Ladakpan Ke	Nominated
2014	Zee Rishtey Awards	Favourite Popular Face – Female	Sapne Suhane Ladakpan Ke	Nominated
2014	Zee Rishtey Awards	Favourite Saas-Bahu	Sapne Suhane Ladakpan Ke	Nominated
