= Aanchal Khurana =

Indian television actress

- Occupation: Actress
- Years active: 2011–present
- Known for: Sapne Suhane Ladakpan Ke

Aanchal Khurana is an Indian television actress. She is the winner of MTV Roadies (season 8), and has worked in Sapne Suhane Ladakpan Ke. She also appeared in episodes of Arjun, Savdhaan India, Aahat and C.I.D..

== Early life ==
Aanchal Khurana hails from Delhi.

== Filmography ==
=== Television ===
Year	Title	Role	Notes	Ref.
2011	MTV Roadies 8	Contestant	Winner	
2012–2014	Sapne Suhane Ladakpan Ke	Charu Garg		
2013	Arjun	Namita	Episode 86	
2014	Savdhaan India	Priya	Episode 742	
2015	Savdhaan India	Supriya	Episode 1052	
2015	Savdhaan India	Rashi Prashant Pandey	Episode 1254	
2015	Savdhaan India	Pragya	Episode 1319	
2015	Savdhaan India	Meenu	Episode 1336	
2015	Savdhaan India	Gayatri Anmol Shah	Episode 1118	
2015	Emotional Atyachar 5	Krutika	Episode 11	
2015	Aahat	Neha/ Chutki	Episode 69	
2015	C.I.D.	Monica / Sonali	Episode 1256	
2015–2016	Sarojini - Ek Nayi Pehal	Maneesha "Mannu"		
2016	Savdhaan India	Kiran	Episode 1506	
2016	Savdhaan India	Sanika	Episode 1619	
2016	Meri Saasu Maa	Roopmati		
2016–2017	Santoshi Maa	Bubbly Tiwari		
2017	Zindagi Ki Mehek	Anjali Ahlawat		
2018	Tu Sooraj, Main Saanjh Piyaji	Madhavi Goenka		
2019	Roop - Mard Ka Naya Swaroop	Himani Singh Vaghela Suryavanshi		
2019	Vikram Betaal Ki Rahasya Gatha	Sugandha	Cameo appearance	
2020	Mujhse Shaadi Karoge	Contestant	Winner	
2021–2023	Bade Achhe Lagte Hain 2	Brinda Aditya Shekhawat		
2025–2026	Tu Juliet Jatt Di	Richa Brar		

=== Web series ===
Year	Title	Role	Notes	Ref.
2021	Crashh	Madhurima Mehra		

== Awards and nominations ==
Year	Award	Category	Work	Result	Ref.
2013	Indian Telly Awards	Best Actress in a Negative Role	Sapne Suhane Ladakpan Ke	Won	
2013	Gold Awards	Best Actress in a Negative Role	Sapne Suhane Ladakpan Ke	Nominated	
2022	Gold Awards	Best Actress in a Supporting Role	Bade Achhe Lagte Hain 2	Won	
