= Keh Doon Tumhein =

Indian mystery thriller television series

- Genre: Mystery; Psychological thriller
- Written by: Zaheer Sheikh
- Screenplay by: Viplav Singh
- Directed by: Raju Sawant
- Starring: Mudit Nayar; Yukti Kapoor
- Country of origin: India
- Original language: Hindi
- No. of episodes: 77

Production
- Producers: Shweta Shinde; Sanjay Khambe
- Camera setup: Multi-camera
- Running time: 22 minutes
- Production company: Vajra Production

Original release
- Network: StarPlus
- Release: 4 September – 19 November 2023

Keh Doon Tumhein (Shall I Tell You) is an Indian Hindi-language mystery thriller television series that aired from 4 September 2023 to 19 November 2023 on StarPlus. Produced by Shweta Shinde for Vajra Production, it stars Mudit Nayar and Yukti Kapoor.

== Plot ==
Kirti moves to the serene hill station of Panchghati with her son, Puru, to live with her uncle and aunt. Her friend Anjali is involved in an affair with Vikrant, a chemistry teacher and vice-principal of Hilltop High School. When Anjali tries to control their relationship, Vikrant kills and buries her with Bittu's help.

Concerned about Anjali's absence, Kirti files an FIR. The police track Anjali's phone, which Puru has. Vikrant takes the phone and tosses it into a passing truck, assuring Kirti that he will help find Anjali. He takes Kirti and Puru on a school trip, where Anjali's body is found. Kirti vows to find the killer, and Vikrant offers to help. Bittu sees his bracelet near the body. Neha steals it, but Kirti returns the evidence to its original location. Vikrant manipulates the police investigation, but Kirti deduces that the killer is Anjali's boyfriend and continues her investigation. Vikrant decides to kill Kirti, and she obtains a job as a librarian at his school.

Vikrant tells a photo of Rohit, his best friend, that he has killed 11 other young women before Anjali; he has photos of all his victims and a necklace made from their hair. Ganesh, a carpenter, steals a gold chain from Vikrant's house. Vikrant kidnaps him, and Bittu holds him captive. Ganesh learns about the murders, and decides to tell the police. He tricks Bittu and goes to a religious procession. Vikrant kills him, misleading the police and destroying evidence of the murder. Kirti finds a file in the school library about the murder of 12 young women, with Anjali's photo. She tells the police, and Shreyash is arrested. At the police station, Shreyash explains that he created the file because of his interest in forensics. Kirti and Vikrant secure Shreyash's release; the police, recognizing Shreyash's skills, make him an assistant in the case. Shreyash suggests that the murders may be the work of a serial killer.

Vikrant, touched by Kirti's selflessness, falls in love. She tells him that she left her abusive husband, Dev. Kirti connects Bittu with Anjali, and he is arrested. Vikrant rescues Bittu and holds him. He accompanies Kirti to buy furniture as she prepares to move into a flat in his home. Mirajkar investigates Anjali's murder and learns that Anjali met her boyfriend at a hotel, often taking Bittu's taxi. He tells Kirti, and Bittu unsuccessfully plans to kill Vikrant. Bittu learns that Mirajkar is following him and hangs him from a tree, thinking that Vikrant is dead, and kidnaps and tortures Kirti. Vikrant rescues her and frames Bittu for the murders; he arranges a power outage at the hospital, poses as a doctor and frees Bittu. Mirajkar is rescued.

Kirti accuses Vikrant of being the serial killer, but Vikrant lies to allay her suspicions and she apologizes. He traps Puru to prevent Kirti from continuing her investigation. When Puru is found, Kirti decides to quietly leave Panchghati. Ritu, Vikrant's student and obsessive lover, recorded Vikrant kidnapping Puru and tells Kirti everything. Vikrant persuades Kirti to stay by promising to protect her and Puru. On Kirti's birthday, Vikrant proposes to her. He kills Ritu when she tells him that Kirti will never be his. Dev is transferred to the Panchghati police station, reigniting his troubled relationship with Kirti; he and Vikrant become enemies. Dev arrests Kirti when her chain is found alongside Ritu, but Vikrant secures her release.

Dev suspects Vikrant, but cannot find evidence. Vikrant releases Bittu, but Dev apprehends him. Vikrant disguises himself and poisons Bittu. Dev discovers Bittu dead in police custody, and is suspended. Vikrant visits Kirti's home with a marriage proposal, and the Mores arrange for their wedding in two days. Jhanvi, a student, tells Dev that she saw Vikrant taking Ritu in his car. Vikrant learns about this and kills her; Dev is blamed when Jhanvi's body is found in his car boot. He runs away, and Anjali's murder case is closed.

Dev plans to kill Vikrant to save Kirti and Puru. After the engagement ceremony, Vikrant kills him. Kirti sees Dev's body, and is horrified. Vikrant tries to kill Kirti, revealing his split personality, and she shoots him.

== Cast ==
=== Main ===
- Mudit Nayar as Vikrant "Sarkar" Deshmukh: Ajay and Nandini's son, King of Panchghati; More family's landlord; Dev's rival; Puru's step father; Kirti's to be husband (Dead)
- Yukti Kapoor as Kirti Shukla: Dilip and Purva's daughter; Sudhakar and Madhuri's niece; Shreyash and Neha's cousin; Dev's ex-wife; Puru's mother; Vikrant's to be wife (2023)

=== Recurring ===
- Aan Tiwari as Purab "Puru" Shukla: Kirti and Dev's son; Vikrant's stepson (2023)
- Vinay Edekar as Sudhakar More: Aau's son; Madhuri's husband; Shreyash and Neha's father; Kirti's uncle (2023)
- Swati Tarar as Madhuri More: Aau's daughter-in-law; Sudhakar's wife; Shreyash and Neha's mother; Kirti's aunt (2023)
- Veena Katti as Mrs. More / Aau: Sudhakar's mother; Madhuri's mother-in-law ; Shreyansh and Neha's grandmother (2023)
- Anil Avhad as Shreyash "Shrey" More: Sudhakar and Madhuri's son; Neha's brother; Kirti's cousin (2023)
- Saloni Rathi as Neha More: Sudhakar and Madhuri's daughter; Shreyash's sister; Kirti's cousin (2023)
- Divya Shetty as Anjali "Anju" Saxena: Kirti's best friend; (2023)
- Mithil Jain as Dev Rathore: Kirti's abusive ex-husband; Puru's biological father; Vikrant's rival
- Akshay Dandekar as SI Amol Jadhav (2023)
- Amit Anand Raut as Bittu Chaudhary: Vikrant's helper (2023)
- Rohini Naik as Ritu Patil: Vikrant's student and obsessive lover (2023)

== Production ==
=== Casting ===
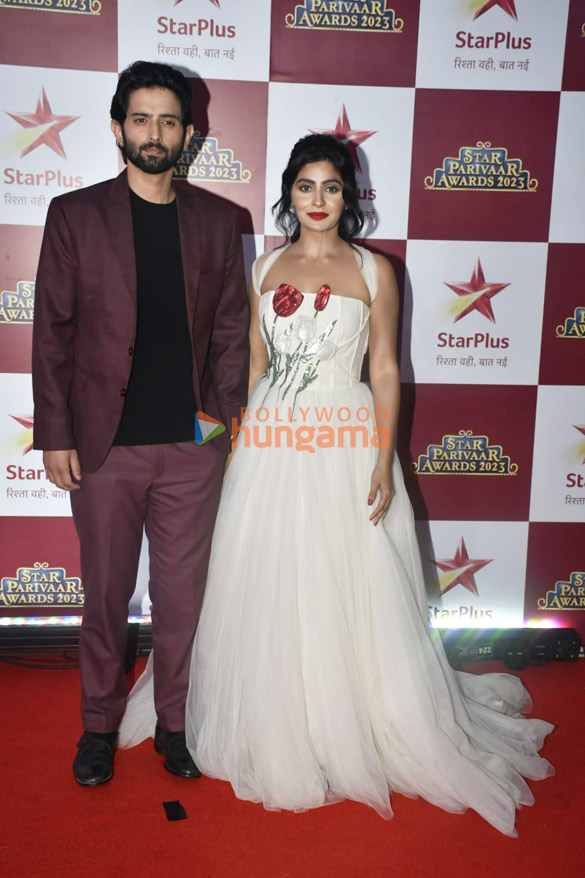
Nayar and Kapoor at the 2023 Star Parivaar Awards

The murder-mystery series was announced by Shweta Shinde's company, Vajra Production. Mudit Nayar was cast as Vikrant, a character with a dark side. Yukti Kapoor was cast as Kirti, a single mother and author. Mithil Jain was later cast as Dev Rathore, Kirti's police-officer ex-husband.

=== Filming and broadcast ===
Keh Doon Tumhein, set in Panchgani, was filmed primarily in Panchgani and at Film City, Mumbai. Its first promo was released on 21 August 2023. The series premiered on 4 September 2023, replacing Titli in its time slot. It ended on 19 November 2023, and was replaced by Yeh Hai Chahatein.

=== Cancellation ===
Nayar confirmed that the series was going off the air on 19 November: "With OTT and foreign films being watched in India, it is high time our TV shows up the game and try something different. But it seems the Indian audiences are still wanting to see typical family dramas and kitchen politics. I am very happy that the makers and the channel tried to attempt something different so that a new trend of the anti-hero can start on TV, but it will take time."

== See also ==
- List of Hindi thriller shows
