= Antara Banerjee =

Indian film and television actress

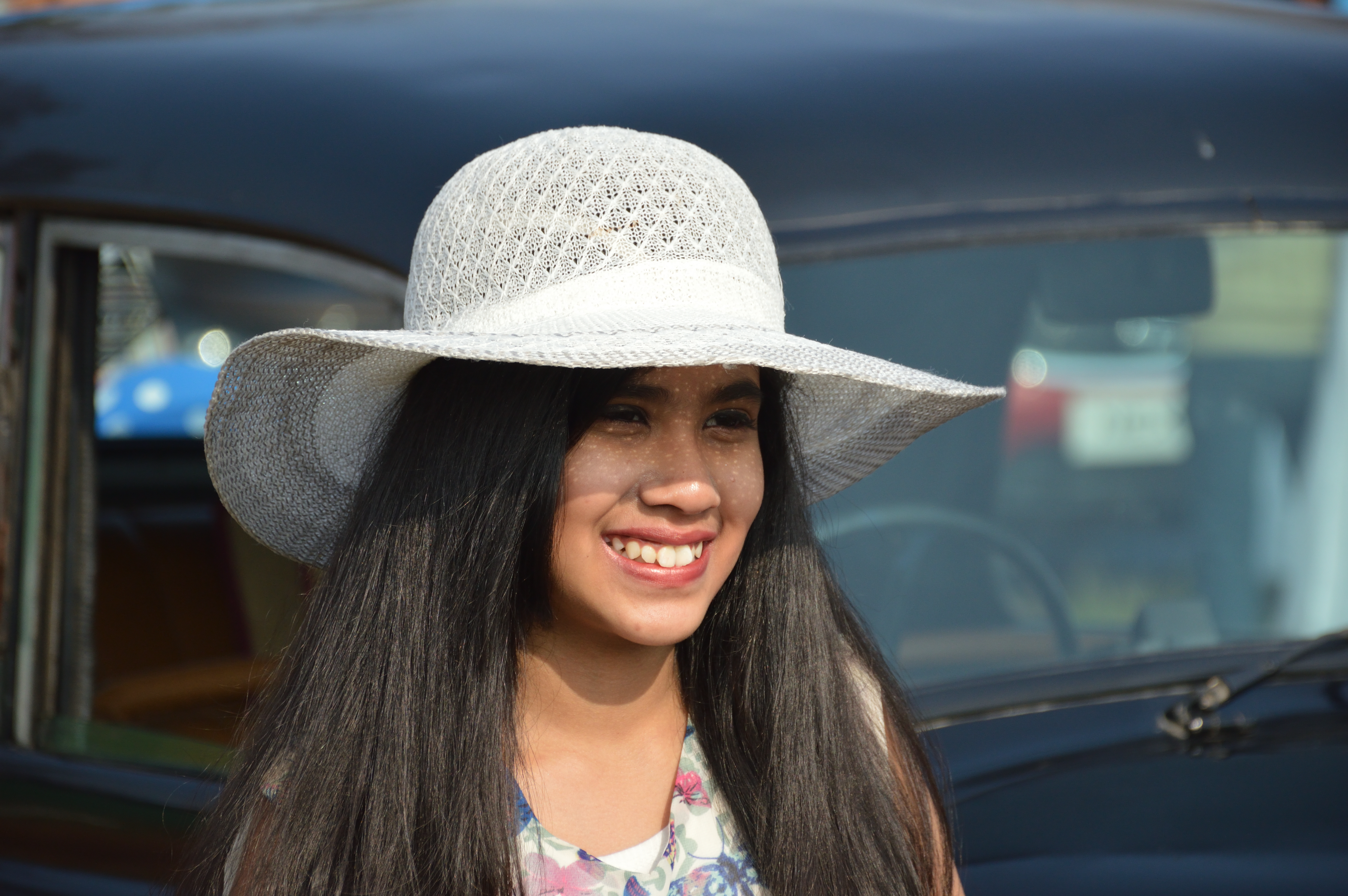
- Occupations: Actress; dancer; singer
- Years active: 2013–present

Antara Banerjee (Born November 1994) is an Indian film and television actress, who appeared in the film The Shaukeens and the television series Gumrah: End of Innocence.

== Personal life ==
Born in a Kulin Brahmin family of Bengal, Antara Banerjee is the only daughter of Subrata and Atasi Banerjee, couple from the "City of Joy" Kolkata, relocated to Bombay city, for fulfilling her ambition of becoming an actress. Being a professional Kathak dancer for the past 15 years. Banerjee has done several stage shows in Kolkata and has pursued training consistently to try her luck in Classical Singing.

== Career ==
Banerjee began her career in television, making her debut with an appearance in Gumrah: End of Innocence. Later she made her film debut with the 2014 comedy film The Shaukeens.

She was next seen in a venture, an episodic role in Life OK crime drama Savdhaan India.

Later, she rejoined television from 2016 to 2018 and played the role of Pinky Ahlawat in &TV's Badho Bahu. Her performance was highly acclaimed and appreciated.

Banerjee then made an episodic appearance in Laal Ishq as Kesar.

That same year, she bagged the role of Suman Sharma in Star Plus series Kasautii Zindagii Kay but exited the show in 2019 and was replaced by Ritu Chauhan.

In 2019, she joined Colors TV's Kavach 2 portraying Sanjana Jindal.

From 2019 to 2020, Banerjee portrayed Chinki Malhotra in Star Plus's fantasy drama Divya Drishti.

== Television ==
Year	Show	Role
2012	Gumrah: End of Innocence	Episodic Role
2014	Savdhaan India	Episodic Role
2016–2018	Badho Bahu	Pinky Rana Singh Ahlawat
2018	Laal Ishq	Kesar Kumari
2018–2019	Kasautii Zindagii Kay	Suman Shekhar Sharma
2019	Kavach... Mahashivratri	Sanjana Jindal
2019–2020	Divya Drishti	Chikki Malhotra
2021	Hero – Gayab Mode On	Aloma

== Filmography ==
Year	Film	Role
2014	The Shaukeens	Cameo Role
2017	Yeh Hai India	Reporter
