= Agnifera =

Indian television series

- Also known as: Agniphera
- Genre: Soap opera
- Created by: Taraknath Mourya
- Written by: Tarak Nath Mourya; Rajesh Singh; Amit jha Agam Gaurav
- Directed by: Taraknath Mourya Vijay singh, Sagar
- Creative director: Aakaash Berry
- Composer: Lalit Sen
- Country of origin: India
- Original language: Hindi
- No. of seasons: 1
- No. of episodes: 483

Production
- Producers: Roshan Lal Kamboj; Ravi Raj
- Cinematography: Danny
- Camera setup: Multi-camera
- Running time: 23 minutes
- Production company: Ravi Raj Creation

Original release
- Network: &TV
- Release: 14 January 2017 – 5 March 2019

Agnifera (transl. holy fire cicles), also known as Agniphera, is an Indian television series that premiered on &TV from 20 March 2017. In the beginning, the series starred Yukti Kapoor, Simaran Kaur and Ankit Gera as the leads from 2017 to 2018. Due to a generation leap in 2018, the series then starred Kapoor, Kaur, Karan Goddwani and Samridh Bawa. The series ended on 25 January 2019.

== Plot ==
MBA graduate Anurag Singh returns to his hometown Bihar after completing his studies in London. His parents have different choices as to who would become his future wife. Vidvaan wants him to marry lawyer Purushottam Singh's daughter Srishti, but Revati wants him to marry the rich thug Vikraal Singh's spoiled daughter Ragini. However, Anurag decides to marry Srishti, and that enrages Ragini. On the wedding day, Vikraal holds Vidvaan at gunpoint and forcefully makes Anurag marry Ragini. To prevent insult, Srishti marries Anurag's mentally disabled younger brother Vishesh, and soon is taunted for being a middle-class girl by Revati and her niece Dulari, who try to sabotage her studies.

Slowly, Anurag begins loving Ragini. Srishti's friend and obsessed lover, Shekhar Sharma, tries to ruin her marriage by misleading the family that they're having an affair. Shrishti and Ragini expose Shekhar, who gets arrested for attempting to kill Vishesh. Ragini and Anurag realise their love and remarry. Rajjo enters for revenge. She turns out to be Vishesh's first wife, who married him in childhood, but as he got mentally disabled due to a head injury, she was assumed to be bad luck for him and was thrown out. Due to this humiliation, Rajjo's father commits suicide and her mother loses her sanity. In present, Rajjo is arrested and Revati finally accepts Srishti and Ragini.

Later, a hitman tries to kill Srishti. Vishu saves her and fights him, but dies in the process after falling off a cliff, and his body isn't found. Baiju Kanpuria, a goon troubles Srishti for slapping him publicly. Later, the family hires him as Srishti's bodyguard. They are assumed having affair and get married forcibly. Ragini is pregnant. Srishti and Baiju eventually fall in love. They meet a man who resembles Vishesh, and assume that he's an alive Vishesh. Revati vows to unite them but Srishti loves Baiju.

Later it is revealed that Vishesh is dead, and the man with his face who wants to separate Baiju and Srishti is actually Shekhar, who escaped jail and went through plastic surgery on his face. He kills Baiju and sends Ragini to jail by falsely accusing her, who in prison later delivers and gives her daughter in adoption. After finding out the truth, Srishti kills Shekhar but also dies after delivering her and Baiju's daughter, who is taken to Anurag's family.

=== 20 years later ===
Srishti's daughter Sakshi is grown-up as like as Ragini's daughter Agni, who lives with her foster mom and finally learns about a late Ragini being her mother. Both Sakshi and Agni fall in love with Kishan Thakur, who loves Agni but Sakshi forcefully weds him. Agni eventually moves on and falls in love with lawyer Sameer, Kishan's cousin, and they get married.

== Cast ==
=== Main ===
- Yukti Kapoor as
  - Ragini Singh – Vikraal and Radha's daughter; Parag's sister; Abhimanyu's ex-fiancée; Anurag's wife; Agni's mother (2017–18) (Dead)
  - Agni Singh Thakur – Ragini and Anurag's daughter; Raksha's adopted daughter; Sakshi's adopted cousin; Kishan's ex-fiancée; Sameer's wife (2018–19)
- Simaran Kaur as
  - Srishti Singh Kanpuria – Purushottam and Maithili's daughter; Anurag's ex-fiancée; Vishesh and Baiju's widow; Sakshi's mother (2017–18) (Dead)
  - Sakshi Kanpuria Thakur – Srishti and Baiju's daughter; Singhs' adopted daughter; Agni's adopted cousin; Kishan's wife (2018–19)
- Ankit Gera as Anurag Singh – Vidvaan and Revati's elder son; Vishesh's brother; Dulari's maternal cousin brother; Srishti's ex-fiancé; Ragini's husband; Agni's father (2017–18) (Dead)
  - Nishkarsh Dixit as young Anurag Singh (2017)
- Mohak Khurana as
  - Vishesh "Vishu" Singh – Vidvaan and Revati's younger son; Anurag's brother; Dulari's maternal cousin brother; Rajjo's ex-husband; Srishti's first husband (2017–18) (Dead)
  - Shekhar Sharma (after plastic surgery) – Srishti's former friend and obsessed lover; Baiju and Srishti's murderer (2018)
    - Divay Dhamja as Shekhar Sharma (before plastic surgery) (2017–18)
- Ayaz Ahmed as Baiju Kanpuria – Don; Srishti's second husband; Sakshi's father (2017–18) (Dead)
- Karan Goddwani as Kishan Thakur – Darshan and Savitri's son; Sameer's cousin; Agni's ex-fiancé; Sakshi's husband (2018–19)
- Samridh Bawa as Sameer Thakur – Lawyer; Danveer and Vaidehi's son; Kishan's cousin; Agni's husband (2018–19)

=== Recurring ===
- Amita Choksi as Revati Singh – Vidvaan's widow; Anurag and Vishesh's mother; Baiju's foster mother; Agni's grandmother; Sakshi's adoptive grandmother (2017–19)
- Sunil Singh as Vidvaan Singh – Brijbhan's brother; Purushottam's best friend; Revati's husband; Anurag and Vishesh's father; Baiju's foster father; Agni's grandfather; Sakshi's adoptive grandfather (2017–18) (Dead)
- Ibrar Yakub as Brijbhan Singh – Vidvaan's brother; Rajjo's lover (2017–18)
- Shakti Singh as Purushottam Singh – Vidvaan's best friend; Maithili's husband; Srishti's father; Sakshi's grandfather (2017–18)
- Deepali Kamath as Maithili Singh – Purushottam's wife; Srishti's mother; Sakshi's grandmother (2017–18)
- Amit Kaushik as Vikraal Singh – Radha's husband; Parag and Ragini's father; Agni's grandfather (2017–18)
- Alpana Buch as Radha Singh – Vikraal's wife; Parag and Ragini's mother; Agni's grandmother (2017–18)
- Aamir Salim Khan as Parag Singh – Vikraal and Radha's son; Ragini's brother (2017)
- Anuradha Singh as Dulari Singh – Revati's niece; Anurag and Vishesh's maternal cousin sister (2017–18)
- Ankit Bhetiwal as Mahesh "Mac" Kapoor – Anurag's friend (2017)
- Rehaan Roy as Abhimanyu Kapoor – Ragini's ex-fiancé (2018)
- Jyotsna Chandola as Rajjo Kaur Sandhu – Vishesh's ex-wife; Brijbhan's lover (2017)
- Prakash Pandit as Narad
- Vishesh Sagar as Baijujjj
- Rutpanna Aishwarya Sethi

== Production ==
=== Casting ===
Yukti Kapoor was roped in to play the lead Ragini, with Ankit Gera as the male lead Anurag Singh. Simran Kaur and Mohak Khurrana were signed to play parallel leads Srishti and Vishesh Singh.

Besides the lead cast, Amita Choksi, Sunil Singh, Deepali Kamath, Shakti Singh and Amit Koushik were roped in to play parents' roles. In June 2017, Divay Dhamja entered as the antagonist Shekhar Sharma though he quit two months later, with his character getting jailed.

In early 2018, Khurana's exit was planned, with his character's supposed death, and his parallel lead role was passed on to Ayaz Ahmed, who was zeroed in opposite Kaur as the gangster Baiju Kanpuria. In July 2018, Khurana rejoined the show by playing both his already alive character and Shekhar Sharma's returned changed face character, thus replacing Dhamja.

In September 2018, the series was planned and finalized to take a 20 year leap with Kapoor and Kaur's previous roles of Ragini and Srishti getting killed, while they were cast to portray their daughters Agni and Sakshi. Gera, Ahmed and Khurana's lead characters also were shown dead, which made them to exit, and Karan Goddwani was introduced as the new male lead Kishan Thakur in October 2018. In December 2018, Samridh Bawa also entered as Sameer Thakur.
