= Abhishek Avasthi =

Indian actor

- Occupations: choreographer, dancer and model
- Years active: Since 2007

Abhishek Avasthi is an Indian actor, choreographer, dancer and model.

== Biography ==
Abhishek Avasthi came to Mumbai in the year 2004 as one of the 32 contestants who had won from across the country while participating in the city rounds of the Zee TV reality show India's Best Cinestars Ki Khoj.

He, along with Rakhi Sawant, an Indian model and actress, participated in the third season of Nach Baliye, a reality dance show on Star Plus.

In 2008, he played the role of Maninder Singh in Jugni Chali Jalandhar which aired on SAB TV. He also appeared in Zara Nach Ke Dikha on Star Plus and Chintu Chinki Aur Ek Badi Si Love Story and Tu Mere Agal Bagal Hai on SAB TV.
