= Muskaan Mihani =

Indian television actress

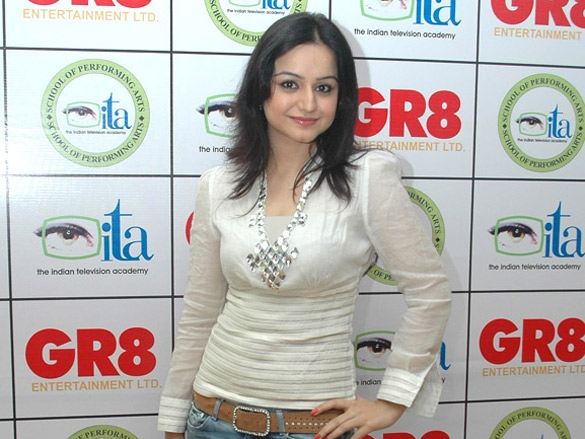
- Mihani at the launch of ITA School of Performing Arts at Noida
- Born: Ahmedabad, Gujarat, India
- Occupation: Actress
- Years active: 2004–2014
- Known for: Dill Mill Gayye
- Height: 5 ft 6 in (1.68 m)
- Spouse: Tushal Sobhani (m. 2013)
- Children: Mannat Sobhani (daughter)
- Parent: Omprakash Mihani (father)
- Relatives: Rishika Mihani (sister); Vishal Mihani (brother)

Muskaan Mihani is an Indian actress. She is known for her roles in Dill Mill Gayye and Jugni Chali Jalandhar.

== Career ==
Muskaan started her career in 2004 with Sahara One's TV show Raat Hone Ko Hai as Anuja. After she played the role of Mandeep / Mandy in Ye Meri Life Hai. In 2006, she played in Pyaar Ke Do Naam: Ek Raadha, Ek Shyaam as Mala, after she roped for parallel lead in Zee TV's show Mamta as Manisha. In 2007, she made her Bollywood debut with Hindi film Heyy Babyy as Isha's friend. She won the medical drama show Dill Mill Gayye, where she played the role of Dr. Sapna. She was last seen in Fear Files: Darr Ki Sacchi Tasvirein as Ritu.

== Personal life ==
Muskaan Mihani was born in Ahmedabad, Gujarat, India in a Sindhi family. She has a younger sister Rishika Mihani, who is also a television actress. Muskaan married with Bandra-based businessman Tushal Sobhani on 1 September 2013. Muskaan Mihani gave birth to a girl in 2015.

== Acting career ==
Television
Year(s)	Title	Role	Notes	Source
2004	Raat Hone Ko Hai	Anuja	Debut serial with episodic role	
2005	Detective Omkar Nath (D.O.N.)	Victim	In two episodic story "Victim of Fraud"	
2004–2005	Ye Meri Life Hai	Mandy		
2004–2005	Kabhi Haan Kabhi Naa (TV series)	Sanjana		
2006	Pyaar Ke Do Naam: Ek Raadha, Ek Shyaam	Mala	Supporting role	
2006–2007	Mamta	Masooma		
2007–2008	Dill Mill Gayye	Dr. Sapna		
2007–2008	Dahhej	Kritika		
2008–2010	Jugni Chali Jalandhar	Dr. Jasmeet Lamba/Jugni Bhalla	lead role	
2010	Aahat	RJ Rakhi	episode "Suno Ek Kahaani Maut Ki Zubaani"	
2010–2011	Ring Wrong Ring	Mansi		
2012	Bhai Bhaiya Aur Brother	Jennifer		
2013	Fear Files: Darr Ki Sacchi Tasvirein	Ritu	episodic role	
2013	Safar Filmy Comedy Ka	Host		

Films

- 2007 Heyy Babyy as Isha's friend
