= Mudit Nayar =

Indian actor

Mudit Nayyar
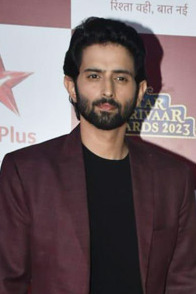
- Nayar in 2023
- Born: Allahabad, Uttar Pradesh, India
- Occupation: Actor
- Years active: 2009–present
- Spouse: Aprajita Shrivastava (m. 2018)

Mudit Nayyar is an Indian television actor.

== Early life ==
Mudit was born in Allahabad.

== Personal life ==
Nayar married his girlfriend Aprajita Shrivastava on 14 February 2018. Mudit has a son .

== Career ==
Mudit made his television début with Palampur Express as Tanmay Bose. Then he played the role of Keshav in Teri Meri Love Stories. Then he bagged the lead role of Jeet in popular horror television serial Anamika opposite Simran Kaur, Annie Gill, and Shivani Surve which was his first major break. He was nominated at the ITA Awards that year for the same. His next project was Badi Devrani in which he portrayed the character of Vibhor Poddar. He next went on to play the role of Vardhan in Devanshi. Then in 2019 he played the role of Yogi in Sony TV 's Ishaaron Ishaaron Mein. For his performance he won ITA Award for Best Actor (Jury). He won the Lions Gold Best Actor Award for the same.After more than 3 years he came back with a serial and played the role of Vikrant deshmukh aka Sarkar . In 2024 he begged the role of Vicky in Kavya .

== Television ==
| Year | Title | Role | Notes | Ref. |
|---|---|---|---|---|
| 2009 | Palampur Express | Tanmay Bose | | |
| 2012 | Teri Meri Love Stories | Keshav | | |
| 2012–2013 | Anamika | Jeet Saluja | | |
| 2014 | Yeh Hai Aashiqui | Ved | | |
| 2015 | Badii Devrani | Vibhor | | |
| 2017 | Devanshi | Vardaan Choudhary | | |
| 2019–2020 | Ishaaron Ishaaron Mein | Yogesh "Yogi" Shrivastava | | |
| 2023 | Keh Doon Tumhein | Vikrant Deshmukh | | |
| 2024 | Kavya – Ek Jazbaa, Ek Junoon | Vikram "Vicky" Adityaraj Kaushal | | |
