= Confessions of an Indian Teenager =

- Genre: Teen drama
- Written by: Rahul Patel
- Country of origin: India
- Original language: Hindi
- No. of seasons: 1
- No. of episodes: 52

Production
- Producers: Ekta Kapoor; Shobha Kapoor; Bhuvanesh Shrivastava; Kushal Zaveri; Nishikant Roy
- Production location: India
- Camera setup: Multi-camera
- Running time: Approx. 22 minutes
- Production companies: ALT Entertainment; Balaji Telefilms

Original release
- Network: Channel V India
- Release: 25 November 2013 – 22 May 2014

Confessions of an Indian Teenager is an Indian teen drama television series aired on Channel V India. The series deals with the problems of teenagers in modern Indian society and each episode ends with a moral. The series premiered on 25 November 2013. It is produced by Balaji Telefilms.

== Cast ==
- Vaibhav Sharma
- Nitesh Choudhary
- Rohan Shah
- Karan Jotwani
- Alam Khan
- Annie Gill
- Mohak Meet
- Lehar Khan
- Kshitija Saxena as Kajal
- Vishal Jethwa
- Barkha Singh
- Sneha Namanandi
