= Anamika (2012 TV series) =

- Inter-title
- Genre: Indian soap opera Mystery; Thriller; Romantic thriller
- Created by: SET Team
- Screenplay by: Jainesh Ejardar; Dialogues; Dheeraj Sarna; Anukalp Goswami
- Story by: Mahesh Pandey; Kamlesh Kunti Singh; Vinit Vyas; Vandana Sharma
- Directed by: Ravi Raj; Glen Barretto; Ankush Mohla
- Creative director: Udayan Pradeep Shukla
- Starring: Mudit Nayar; Simran Kaur; Annie Gill; Shivani Surve
- Country of origin: India
- Original language: Hindi
- No. of seasons: 1
- No. of episodes: 206

Production
- Producers: Vikas Seth; Mahesh Pandey
- Production location: India
- Cinematography: Raju Halasagi
- Editor: Tarun Sunil Babbar
- Camera setup: Multi-camera
- Running time: Approx. 20 minutes
- Production company: Trishula Productions

Original release
- Network: Sony Entertainment Television
- Release: 26 November 2012 – 13 September 2013

Anamika is an Indian soap opera that aired on Sony Entertainment Television. It premiered on 26 November 2012 and went off-air on 13 September 2013. It is Vikas Seth's debut show as a producer on Sony Television and tells the love story of Anamika and Jeet.

== Plot ==
Jeet Saluja starts encountering a mysterious woman. Her identity is later revealed as Anamika, an extremely beautiful woman who lives alone in a large bungalow in the forest.

Anamika loves Jeet and he is strangely attracted to her. He discovers that it is in fact a negative energy that is trying to win him over and he stops meeting her. Eventually, he realises his love for Rano, his childhood best friend.

Anamika, revealed to be a witch, abducts Jeet and takes him to her house where bodies of the different men she married and killed, hang. Rano tries to save him but fails. Jeet manages to escape and is finally reunited with his family. Anamika is shown to have committed suicide.

After many difficulties, Jeet and Rano get married. Anamika’s spirit returns and begins to haunt the family. In trying to defeat Anamika, Rano dies but her spirit does not attain salvation and can communicate only with a girl named Chhavi.

=== After some time ===
Jeet has left boxing and starts working at his father's company with Chhavi as his secretary. Anamika returns in human form. Chhavi and Jeet become close. At the same time Jeet gets close to Anamika. Rano’s spirit communicates to Chhavi that she must marry Jeet. Jeet's family get them married much to Anamika's discontent.

Anamika starts living with Jeet and Chhavi and causes conflicts between them. Realising Anamika's truth, Chhavi throws her out of the house but Anamika makes the family suspect Chhavi of practising black magic and they oust her.

Chhavi finally succeeds in bringing out Anamika's truth but Jeet is forced to go to Anamika's house to rescue his mother, Pushpa. Pushpa is saved but at the cost of Jeet's soul. Anamika makes her house disappear and buries Jeet but his family succeeds in finding his body. Meanwhile, Anamika manages to take Jeet's soul to the netherworld and puts him in a trance and they copulate. Anamika's wish comes true, as she becomes pregnant with Jeet's child.

Chhavi, desperate to save Jeet, gives up her own soul and goes to the netherworld. She manages to get her hands on a trident, the only thing which could destroy Anamika. Anamika wishes to keep Jeet with her forever and to make this happen Jeet has to be transformed into one of them, but Chhavi confronts Anamika ending Jeet's trance. Anamika is stabbed with the trident by Jeet and loses her powers and dies. Finally, the souls of Jeet and Chhavi return to their respective bodies. They are reunited with the family. Later that night, Jeet and Chhavi consummate their marriage.

In a past life, it is revealed that Jeet and Chhavi were king and queen but Jeet was in a relationship with Anamika. Chhavi curses Anamika to live till the end of time. Time passes and Chhavi and Jeet die but Anamika doesn't. She waits for Jeet and has been marrying and killing Jeet in each of his births since.

=== 2 months later ===
Chhavi is two months pregnant. One day, the family find a baby girl at their doorstep. They decide to keep the baby with them until they find her parents. Unbeknownst to them, the baby is Anamika and Jeet’s daughter and Anamika's supernatural powers now reside in her baby.

== Cast ==
- Simran Kaur as Anamika Malhotra/Chandralekha, a witch cursed to live till the end of time
- Mudit Nayar as Jeet Saluja
- Annie Gill as Rano Walia, Jeet's first wife
- Shivani Surve as Chhavi Gupta, Jeet's second wife
- Madhumalti Kapoor as Harmeet "Bebe" Saluja, Jeet's grandmother
- Deepak Dutta as Pratap Saluja, Jeet's father
- Sonika Gill as Pushpa Pratap Saluja, Jeet's mother
- Hemant Chaddha as Balraj Saluja, Jeet's elder brother
- Sonia Kaur as Jasleen Balraj Saluja, Balraj's wife
- Namrata Dhamija as Ritu Walia
- Anisha Vora as Guddi Walia
- Manmohan Tiwari as Inspector Abhay Gupta
- Savita Bajaj as Paatalika
- Pushkar Goggiaa as Anand Kumar
- Papiya Sengupta as Shalaka

== See also ==
- List of programs broadcast by Sony Entertainment Television
