= Ye Meri Life Hai =

- Written by: Reshma Khan: Santram Varma; Bobby Bhonsle; S. Farhan; Amit Senchoudhary
- Directed by: Apoorva Acharya; Ravi Raj
- Starring: See below
- Theme music composer: Pritam
- Opening theme: "Ye Meri Life Hai" by Shreya Ghoshal
- Country of origin: India
- Original language: Hindi
- No. of seasons: 2
- No. of episodes: 323

Production
- Producers: Vipul D Shah & Sanjiv Sharma
- Running time: approx. 23 minutes
- Production company: Optimystix Entertainment

Original release
- Network: Sony Entertainment Television (India)
- Release: 3 May 2004 – November 2005

Ye Meri Life Hai (transl. This is my life) is a Hindi TV serial that aired on Sony TV. The story reflects the aspirations and dreams of today's youth, as they battle it out with conventions and norms to carve their own niche in the world. The screenplay and dialogues of the initial episodes were penned by Arif Ali and Sanyukta Chaudhuri.

== Plot ==
The story revolves around a young girl named Pooja Mehta, who hails from a conservative middle-class Gujarati household in Mumbai. Pooja dreams of becoming a successful film director and idolises Karan Johar.

To realise her dream, Pooja secretly joins a film studies course at the St. Martin's College, keeping her father in the dark. At the college, the Pooja instantly comes face to face with the other students of St. Martins's and is made aware of her middle-class looks and attitude. She is ill-treated by the well-to-do English speaking students who label her as 'vernacular' as she speaks in her Gujarati tone and accent. The story revolves around her college life as she gradually wins over her classmates, makes new friends and completes her course.

Later, the story shifts to Pooja's life after college as she starts the new chapter in her life as an independent working woman. Her sister, Poornima falls in love with and marries Ronit. Young and rich businessman Ashmit woos Pooja and they get married. Pooja soon discovers that Ashmit, supposedly Ronit's step-brother, is in fact an impostor who kills Poornima to keep his secret safe. Eventually, Ashmit is arrested and is sent to prison.

A broken and dejected Pooja is encouraged by Ronit to regroup herself and to continue her journey of accomplishing her goal of becoming a film director. Pooja finally finishes her first film. At the premier, Ronit proposes to her and she happily accepts.

== Cast ==
- Shama Sikander as Pooja Ashmit Gujral
- Rahil Azam as Ashmit Malhotra, Pooja’s husband
- Muskaan Mihani as Mandeep "Mandy"Sodhi, Pooja's best friend
- Amit Jain as Ronit Gujral, Pooja’s former lover, lateral her Brother in law, Ashmit’s half brother
- Simple Kaul as Reema Gujral,
- Toasty Joshi / Aparna Tarakad / Kavita Kaushik as Annie
- Manoj Joshi as RasikLal Mehta, Pooja's father
- Vandana Pathak as Pooja's mother
- Shital Thakkar as Poornima, Pooja's sister
- Kishori Godbole as Prerna
- Tanaaz Currim as Jayshree
- Sudhanshu Pandey as Professor Vikram Roy
- Shweta Kawatra as Shweta Kawatra
- Kavita Kaushik as Annie
- Smita Bansal as Poornima, Pooja's sister
- Sumeet Sachdev as Jatin
- Ajay Arya as Akash
- Krutika Desai Khan as Ronit's mother
- Salil Acharya as Kushaan
- Sujata Mehta as Ronit's mother
- Abhijit Kelkar as Poornima's boyfriend and father of her child
- Manmeet Singh as Mandy's father
- Mihir Mishra as Gautam
- Gurmeet Choudhary as Gurmeet
- Nishigandha Wad
- Amit Singh
- Nikhil Yadav
