= Sapne Suhane Ladakpan Ke =

2012-2015 Indian television series broadcast on Zee TV

- Genre: Indian soap opera; Drama
- Created by: Shakuntalam Telefilms
- Written by: Priya Ramanathan, Lavleen Mishra, dialogues - Swapnil Mahaling
- Screenplay by: Anjum Abbas
- Directed by: Rajesh Babbar
- Creative director: Raghav Singh
- Starring: Roopal Tyagi; Mahima Makwana; Ankit Gera; Piyush Sahdev
- Country of origin: India
- Original language: Hindi
- No. of episodes: 707

Production
- Producers: Shyamashish Bhattacharya; Neelima Bajpa
- Production locations: Varanasi; Mumbai
- Camera setup: Multi-camera
- Running time: 22 minute
- Production company: Shakuntalam Telefilm

Original release
- Network: Zee TV
- Release: 21 May 2012 – 23 January 2015

Sapne Suhane Ladakpan Ke is an Indian television series that aired on Zee TV from 21 May 2012 to 23 January 2015. The show focused on celebrating adolescence by portraying the lives of two teenage cousins, Gunjan and Rachana. The teenage years signify the start of a person's youth, and the experiences during this period have lasting effects on personality.

== Plot ==
Gunjan Sandhu, a fun-loving girl lives in Mumbai with her mother Sneha. Her father Akash leaves for his business in Australia. Suffering cancer, Sneha expresses concern for Gunjan to her sister Shail. Shy and introverted, Shail's daughter Rachana Garg hails from Benaras. Her father, Dayal wants to get her married off if she fails in her exams. As Sneha dies, Shail brings Gunjan to Benaras. With many difficulties Gunjan settles herself in Garg Family much to Dayal's dismay due to her city lifestyle and modern ideas.

The Gargs later celebrate their son Mayank's return to home. Slowly the cousins Rachana and Gunjan turns friends. Rachana is interested in hockey. Later, Dayal also supports her, but fixes her wedding to Vihan, who flirts with Gunjan. She exposes him and the alliance is broken off. Gunjan and Mayank fall in love and try to elope but on the wedding day she rejects the idea of cheating parents and tells Mayank to return home and they return. Shail announces Mayank and Gunjan's wedding, but on the day, Charu marries him.

Rachana, her boss Kabir and Gunjan expose Charu, who is jailed. Gunjan and Mayank marry. Working in Kabir's company, Rachana falls for him but he leaves her for caring for Bittu, his mentally ill brother. She decides to care for him and leaves. Mayank and Gunjan start fighting and part ways.

=== 6 months later ===
Mayank and Gunjan miss each other, returning home to tell family they failed to unite. Bittu is hospitalized; Rachana still cares of him. It turns out that Gunjan has lost her memory due to an accident, a truth that also leaves Rachana heartbroken. She finds a job of decorator at the house of Omkar Luthra, who is shocked to see her because she looks like his late wife, Divya.

Omkar's son Lucky is attached to Rachana, thinking she's Divya. Omkar learns that his brother Lalit killed Divya, and gets him arrested. He thanks Rachana, who consoles Lucky. Gunjan and Mayank affirm to forget the past and start afresh. Kabir returns, and Rachana still loves him. Eventually, he also realizes his love for her but due to his past deeds the Garg Family first disagrees but later accepts him and they marry. Rachana and Gunjan turn out to be pregnant. In the end, all the Garg Family members pose for a group photo.

== Cast ==
=== Main ===
- Roopal Tyagi as Gunjan Sandhu Garg: Akash and Sneha's daughter; Rachna and Pihu's cousin, Mayank's wife (2012-2015)
- Mahima Makwana as
  - Rachna Garg Tripathi: Dayal and Shail's younger daughter; Pihu's younger sister; Mayank, Gunjan, Vikram and Dolu's cousin; Vihaan's former lover; Bittu's caretaker; Kabir's wife (2012–2015)
  - Divya Luthra: Omkar's wife; Lucky's mother (2014)
    - Jagrati Sethia as Young Rachana Garg
- Ankit Gera as Mayank Garg: Prabhu and Seema's son; Pihu, Vikram, Rachna and Dolu's cousin; Charu's ex-husband; Gunjan's husband 2012–2015)
- Piyush Sahdev as Kabir Tripathi: Gayatri's son; Bittu's brother; Sonal's former lover; Rachna's husband (2012–2015)

=== Recurring ===
- Alihassan Turabi as Omkar "Om" Luthra: Lalit's brother; Divya's widower; Lucky's father (2014)
- Harsh Rajput as Kush "Bittu" Tripathi: Gayatri's younger son; Kabir's brother (2014–2015)
- Vaishnavi Mahant as Shail Garg: Dayal's wife; Pihu and Rachna's mother; Sneha's elder sister; Akash's ex-fiancé (2012–2015)
- Nidhi Jha as Chhaya Khanna: Rachna and Gunjan's friend (2012–2013)
- Shakti Singh as Dayal Garg: Prabhu and Gopal's brother; Shail's husband; Pihu and Rachna's father (2012–2015)
- Diwakar Pundir / Rio Kapadia as Akash Kumar Sandhu: Sneha's widower; Gunjan's father; Shail's ex-fiancé (2012) / (2013–2014)
- Chandan Madan as Vikrant "Vicky" Gadgill
- Bhuvnesh Shetty as Prabhu Garg: Jiji, Dayal and Gopal's brother; Seema's husband; Mayank's father (2012–2015)
- Alka Mogha as Seema Garg: Prabhu's wife; Mayank's mother (2012–2015)
- Akanksha Gilani as Pihu Garg: Shail and Dayal's elder daughter; Rachna's elder sister; Mayank, Gunjan and Dolu's cousin; Murali's wife; Khushi's mother (2012–2015)
- Anshul Singh as Murali: Pihu's husband; Khushi's father (2014-2015)
- Meet Mukhi as Lakshman "Dolu" Garg: Sangeeta and Gopal's son; Pihu, Rachna and Mayank's cousin (2012–2015)
- Parakh Madan as Bindiya Choudhary: Mayank's fake fiancé (2014-2015)
- Rahul Sharma as Vikram: Pihu; Mayank; Rachna and Dolu's cousin; Charu's former fiancé (2014)
- Sanket Chouksey as Lalwind "Lalit" Luthra: Omkar's brother (2014)
- Ankit Bhardwaj as Vachan Singh (2014)
- Aanchal Khurana as Charu Garg: Mayank's ex-wife; Sangeeta's cousin; Vikram's former fiancé; Gautam Seghal's fake wife (2012–2014)
- Chandrika Saha as Sonal: Kabir's ex-girlfriend
- Nikhil Chaddha as Vihaan Agarwal: Savitri's son; Rajeev's brother; Rachna's ex-fiancé (2012–2013)
- Joyshree Arora as Manvira Tripathi: Kabir and Bittu's grandmother (2013–2015)
- Madhavi Gogate as Jiji: Dayal, Prabhu and Gopal's sister (2012-2014)
- Shabana Mullani as Sangeeta Garg: Gopal's wife; Dolu's mother; Charu's cousin (2012–2015)
- Shresth Kumar as Aditya
- Manasi Salvi as Sneha Sandhu: Akash's wife; Gunjan's mother; Shail's younger sister (2012) (Dead)
- Seema Pandey as Savitri Agarwal: Vihaan and Rajeev's mother (2012–2013)
- Ahmad Harhash as Piyush Malhotra (2012-2015)
- Mamata Luthra as Mausiji: Seema's aunt
- Shamik Abbas as Gopal Garg: Jiji, Dayal and Prabhu's brother; Sangeeta's husband; Dolu's father
- Zohaib Siddiqui as Rajeev Agarwal: Savitri's son; Vihaan's brother (2012–13)
- Astha Agarwal as Vidhi Sethi: a disguised gang leader (2014)
- Guru Paramanand
- Divya Jagdale as Shalini Pandey: a corrupt politician

=== Cameo appearance ===
- Ajay Devgn in the Holi episode
- Tamannaah Bhatia in the Holi episode
- Sajid Khan in the Holi episode
- Nishant Pandey as Shree

== Production ==
=== Development and Premier ===
The series produced by Shakuntalam Telefilms was a story depicting the lives of youth and the problems they face. The show premiered on 21 May 2012 and airs from Monday to Friday. At the launch event, while talking about the show, Sukesh Motwani, Fiction Head of Zee TV, said, "Sapne Suhane Ladakpan ke is all about celebrating adolescence. The show is full of hope, aspirations, wish, longing, desire and yearning. The idea was to enrich the lives of the viewers through an endearing content which will remind them of their carefree wonder years." Further, producer Neelima Bajpai, said, "We’ve made the show look youthful and appealing".

=== Casting ===
Roopal Tyagi and Mahima Makwana were cast to play lead roles of Gunjan and Rachana respectively. Vaishnavi Mahant and Manasi Salvi were cast to play the prominent roles. Ankit Gera was paired opposite Roopal Tyagi. Apparently Nikhil Chaddha was paired opposite Mahima Makwana, after his exit, in December 2013, Piyush Sahdev had been hired to play Mahima Makwana's love interest. After a six-month leap, Alihassan Turabi makes an entry in the show to play Omkar, opposite Divya (resemblance of Rachana's face). However, soon his track ended, and after three months re-enter the show recovering from his knee injury. Aanchal Khurana was hired to play main villain role of Charu. The rest of the cast included Alka Mogha, Harsh Rajput, Shakti Singh.

=== Special episode and events ===
"Rachana Ki Sagai" was a special episode broadcast on 19 January 2013. The episode showcases Rachana and Vihan's engagement ceremony. The episode had various television actors performing on different songs.

- Ajay Devgn
- Tamannaah Bhatia
- Sajid Khan
- Ankita Lokhande
- Karanvir Bohra
- Sara Khan
- Rubina Dilaik
- Suhasi Dhami
- Rithvik Dhanjani
- Asha Negi
- Ashish Sharma
- Ekta Kaul
- Kanan Malhotra
- Neha Janpandit
- Aniruddh Dave
- Vibha Chibber
- Vindhya Tiwari
- Pankaj Kansara
- Swati Bajpai
- Preet Kaur Nayak

"Ladakpan Ke Suhane Rang" was a three-hour Holi special event hosted by Zee TV celebrated on the sets of Sapne Suhane Ladakpan Ke wherein various actors from the Zee TV family performed. The episode showcases the Holi of three different states, including Shail of Sapne Suhane Ladakpan Ke celebrating Holi in Uttar Pradesh style, Neetu of Ek Mutthi Aasman and Saavri Bua of Aur Pyaar Ho Gaya showcasing Holi of Punjab and Rajasthan.

"Dawat-E-Eid" was an Eid special event on the sets of Qubool Hai where Rachana and Mayank gave their individual performances. A crossover episode was filmed with Ek Mutthi Aasmaan on 5 May 2014.

== Adaptations ==
Language	Title	Original release	Network(s)	Last aired	Notes
Marathi	Saara Kahi Tichyasathi सारं काही तिच्यासाठी	21 August 2023	Zee Marathi	14 September 2024	Remake
Tamil	Sandhya Raagam சந்தியா ராகம்	9 October 2023	Zee Tamil	Ongoing	Remake

== Reception ==
In week 6, 2013 with the rating of 4.3 TVR the show climbed to number one spot in the Hindi GEC space, with reference to the show's success the Hindustan Times stated "Television's prime time slot gets redefined". The report published on May 4, 2013, stated that with 2.9 Trp the show achieved third position among top 10 fictional shows. An article published by toi in 2013 quoting, "Love stories pulling up TRPs on small screen", mentioned that the show received 4.0 Trp in week 4. Yet another report published on June 29, 2013, stated that the show remained at No. 6 among top 10 fiction shows Top 10 fiction shows with the rating of 2.6. In week 16,2013, with the Trp of 2.5 show remained at No. 6. In week 17,2014 it averaged to 5.3 TVR. However, it week 18,2014 it averaged to 4.7 TVR.

== Awards ==
Year	Award	Category	Recipient
2012	Zee Rishtey Awards	Favourite Behen	Roopal Tyagi, Mahima Makwana
2012	Zee Rishtey Awards	Favourite Beti	Mahima Makwana
2012	Zee Rishtey Awards	Favourite Naya Sadasya-Female	Mahima Makwana
2012	Zee Rishtey Awards	Favourite Nayi Jodi	Roopal Tyagi, Ankit Gera
2013	Zee Rishtey Awards	Favourite Behen	Roopal Tyagi, Mahima Makwana
2013	Zee Rishtey Awards	Favourite Parivaar	Sapne Suhane Ladakpan Ke
2013	Indian Telly Awards	Indian Telly Award for Best Actress in a Negative Role	Aanchal Khurana
2014	Zee Rishtey Awards	Favourite Mata-Pita	Vaishnavi Mahant, Shakti Singh
