= Annie Gill =

Indian television actress

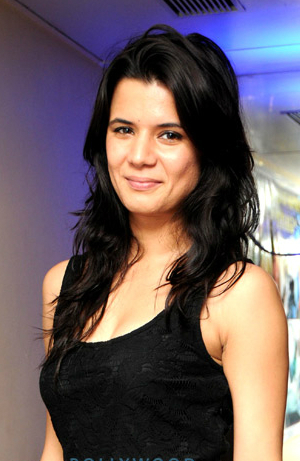
- Gill in 2014.
- Born: February 24; Ferozepur, Punjab, India
- Occupation: Actress
- Years active: 2010–present

Annie Gill (born in Ferozepur, Punjab, India) is an Indian television actress. She entered in television with as a game partner of Rahul Bose in reality show Khatron Ke Khiladi season 3. After she made her career with reality show Zor Ka Jhatka: Total Wipeout as Contestant. In 2012, she was approached in teen drama show Friendship Baazi as Anjie. Her first major role was in Anamika as Rano. She has done episodics in Confessions of an Indian Teenager and Savdhaan India @ 11. She was last seen in Anamika as Rano.

== Personal life ==
Annie was born in Ferozepur, Punjab, India and comes from a Punjabi Sikh family.

== Television ==
Year(s)	Title	Role	Channel	Notes
2008	Arslaan	Rudabeh	Sony TV	
2010	Khatron Ke Khiladi season 3	Herself	Colors TV	Rahul Bose's partner.
2011	Zor Ka Jhatka: Total Wipeout	Herself	Imagine TV	debut show
2012	Friendship Baazi	Anjie	MTV India	Youth based show.
2012–2013	Anamika	Rano	Sony TV	lead role.
2013	Confessions of an Indian Teenager		Channel V India	episodic role
2013	Savdhaan India @ 11		Life OK	episodic role
2014	Love by Chance	Roshni	Bindass	Appeared in 1st episode Aur Phir Baji Ghanti on 31 May 2014
2014	Yeh Hai Aashiqui	Ayesha	Bindass	Appeared in episode 60 The Money Factor
2015	Yeh Hai Aashiqui Siyappa Ishq Ka	Krish	Bindass	Appeared in 1st episode.
2015	Hum Ne Li Hai... Shapath	A cop	Life OK	Weekend crime series
2016	Vishkanya	Malay's Fiancée	Zee TV	Cameo Role
2016	Savdhaan India	Shruthi	Life OK	Episodic
2016	Savdhaan India	Seema	Life OK	Episodic lead
2016	Tashan-e-Ishq	Sonia	Zee TV	Cameo role
2016	Shapath Supercops v/s Supervillans		Life OK	Episodic appearance
2017	MTV Big F#Season 2	Madhu	MTV INDIA	Episodic appearance Episode 4:"A transgender love story"

== Filmography ==
Year(s)	Title	Role	Notes
2011	Aanmai Thavarael	Malayali girl	Tamil film
