= Ankit Gera =

Indian television actor (born 1987)

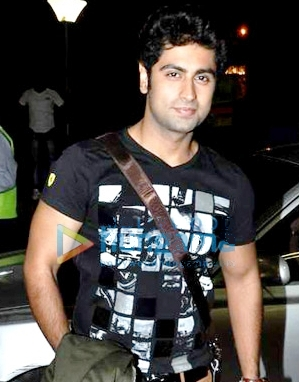
- Gera in 2015
- Born: 1 September 1987 (age 38); New Delhi, India
- Occupations: Actor; Television host
- Years active: 2009–present
- Known for: Mann Kee Awaaz Pratigya; Sapne Suhane Ladakpan Ke; Agnifera; Hara Sindoor
- Spouse: Rashi Puri (m. 2021)
- Children: 1

Ankit Gera (born 1 September 1987) is an Indian actor who works in Hindi television dramas. He was a contestant on Bigg Boss 9.

== Personal life ==
Gera completed his studies in Delhi.

He was in a relationship with the actress Adaa Khan, but they broke up in 2013. Later, he was in a relationship with his Sapne Suhane Ladakpan Ke co-star Roopal Tyagi before they broke up in 2015. In 2019, he began dating the actress Sara Khan with whom he did a guest appearance in Santoshi Maa.

In 2021, Gera married Rashi Puri, a NRI Nigerian, in a private Hindu wedding ceremony. The following year, Puri gave birth to their son.

== Career ==
After completing his studies, Gera began his acting career in Hindi television with the rom-com Mahi Way on Sony Entertainment Television.

His first big part was in 2009 in the television show Mann Kee Awaaz Pratigya as Adarsh Saxena which he left in 2011 and was replaced by Aniruddh Singh.

His first lead role came opposite Roopal Tyagi in 2012 in Zee TV's soap opera Sapne Suhane Ladakpan Ke as Mayank Garg, for which he received several nominations. The show ended in 2015.

In 2015, he took part in Killer Karaoke Atka Toh Latkah. That year he appeared as Bhasmasur in the fantasy action series Maharakshak: Devi on Zee TV that failed commercially.

In October 2015, Gera was a celebrity contestant in the 9th season of popular Indian reality game show Bigg Boss. He was evicted on Day 7.

In 2006, he was seen as Atish in an episode of Yeh Hai Aashiqui with Pooja Sharma. In the same year, he gave a guest appearance in &TV's mythological drama Santoshi Maa produced by Rashmi Sharma Telefilms with his girlfriend, Sara Khan.

In March 2017, Gera began as the main character alongside Yukti Kapoor and Simraan Kaur in the TV series Agniphera as MBA graduate Anurag Singh. He left the show in 2018, after his character's death.

== Television ==
Year	Title	Role	Notes	Ref(s)
2009	Mahi Way	Nikhil		
2009–2011	Mann Kee Awaaz Pratigya	Adarsh Saxena		
2012–2015	Sapne Suhane Ladakpan Ke	Mayank Garg		
2015	Killerr Karaoke Atka Toh Latkah	Contestant		
2015	Maharakshak: Devi	Bhasma		
2015	Bigg Boss 9	Contestant	Evicted Day 7	
2016	Yeh Hai Aashiqui	Aatish	Season 4, episode 15 - "Trafficking"	
2016	Santoshi Maa	Nikhil	Guest appearance	
2017–2018	Agniphera	Anurag Singh	Protagonist	
2018	XXX	Bunty	Web series	
2021	Choti Sarrdaarni	Sameer Shastri	Cameo Role	
2021	Molkki	Daksh Singh Shekhawat		
2022	Hara Sindoor	Bhuvan		
2023	Nath – Zewar Ya Zanjeer	Captain Aditya Rathore		
