= Samridh Bawa =

Indian actor

- Born: Delhi, India
- Occupation: Actor
- Years active: 2010–present

Samridh Bawa is an Indian television actor. He is majorly known for his role of Leeladhar Chaturvedi in Life OK's Mere Rang Mein Rangne Waali and Karan Singh Chauhan in Colors TV's Ek Shringaar-Swabhiman and the role of Jigar in Balika Vadhu 2.

== Filmography ==
=== Television ===
Year	Title	Role	Notes	Ref.
2010	Gumrah: End of Innocence		Season 4	
2010	Crime Patrol			
2010	Get Gorgeous (Season 6)	Contestant	11th place	
2012–2013	Kya Huaa Tera Vaada	Rohan Kapoor		
2013	The Buddy Project	Omkar "Omi" Dhaiya		
2014–2015	Mere Rang Mein Rangne Waali	Leeladhar Chaturvedi		
2015–2016	Swim Team	Bhagat Kapadia		
2015	Gangaa	Bal Mahant Gautam	Cameo	
2016–2017	Ek Shringaar-Swabhiman	Karan Singh Chauhan		
2017	Dil Se Dil Tak	Karan Singh Chauhan	Crossover Episodes	
2018	Laal Ishq	Rishi Kumar Gupta		
2018–2019	Agniphera	Advocate Sameer Thakur		
2019	Laal Ishq	Suketu Rajan		
2020	Alif Laila	Thief Jindal's Goon		
2021–2022	Balika Vadhu 2	Jigar Anjaariya		
2021	Sirf Tum	Jigar Anjaariya	For New Year Celebration	
2025–present	Pushpa Impossible	Ashwin Patel		
