= Simran Kaur Hundal =

Indian television actress

- Occupation: Actress
- Years active: 2009–2021
- Known for: Na Aana Is Des Laado; Anamika
- Spouse: Sikandar Singh Virk (m. 2014)

Simran Kaur Hundal is an Indian actress who mainly works in Hindi television. She made her acting debut in 2009 with Love Ne Mila Di Jodi portraying Roshni Gujral Saxena. She is best known for her portrayal of Diya Sangwan Singh in Na Aana Is Des Laado and Anamika Malhotra/Chandralekha in Anamika.

== Personal life ==
Hundal married her boyfriend Sikandar Singh Virk on 27 November 2014 in Chandigarh.

== Career ==
Hundal began her career as a voice artist, dubbing the Hindi voice of Nobita, a character from the Japanese anime series Doraemon for nearly a decade, before transitioning to television acting.

She made her acting debut with Love Ne Mila Di Jodi portraying Roshni Gujral Saxena opposite Dishank Arora from 2009 to 2010.

From 2010 to 2012, she portrayed Diya Sangwan Singh opposite Varun Kapoor in Na Aana Is Des Laado. It marked a major turning point in her career.

Hundal portrayed Anamika Malhotra/ Chandralekha in Anamika opposite Mudit Nayar from 2012 to 2013 and received praises for her role.

In 2016, she portrayed a Ghost in the story "Bhootani Bani Mehmaan" on Khidki. She portrayed Parvati in Vikram Betaal Ki Rahasya Gatha in 2019.

In 2021, she made her web debut with Kuch Love Jaisa portraying Roshni opposite Aadar Malik. She has also been part of various music videos.

== Filmography ==
=== Television ===
Year	Title	Role	Notes	Ref.
2009–2010	Love Ne Mila Di Jodi	Roshni Gujral Saxena		
2010–2012	Na Aana Is Des Laado	Diya Sangwan Singh		
2012–2013	Anamika	Anamika Malhotra/ Chandralekha		
2016	Khidki	Ghost	Story: "Bhootani Bani Mehmaan"	
2019	Vikram Betaal Ki Rahasya Gatha	Parvati		

=== Web series ===
Year	Title	Role	Notes	Ref.
2021	Kuch Love Jaisa	Roshni	Mini-series	

=== Music videos ===
Year	Title	Singer(s)	Ref.
2016	Ikk Vaari Hor Soch Lae	Harish Verma	
2016	Laembadgini	Diljit Dosanjh	
2017	Yaar Ve	Harish Verma	
2019	Vaare Vaare	Mehtab Virk	
2020	Main Suneya	Ammy Virk	
2020	Ae Kaash	Babbal Rai	
