= Saath Nibhaana Saathiya 2 =

Indian television series (2020)

- Genre: Soap opera
- Created by: Rashmi Sharma
- Developed by: Sushanta Das; Pearl Grey; Rashmi Grey
- Written by: Garima Dimri; Nikita Dhond; Abhijeet Guru; Abhijeet Sinha; Tanya Sinha; Anjali Bahura; Tapasya Udyawar; R.M Joshi; Shabia Walia; Dialogue: Rekha Modi; Yash Kumar Sharda
- Directed by: Pawan Kumar Marut; Ravi Raaj; Yash Sinha; Pawan Sahu; Ajay Mishra
- Creative directors: Sanyukta Sharma; Deepa Nigamm; Pawandeep Kaur
- Starring: Sneha Jain; Harsh Nagar; Gautam Vig; Akanksha Juneja
- Opening theme: Saath Nibhaana Saathiya
- Country of origin: India
- Original language: Hindi
- No. of seasons: 2
- No. of episodes: 550

Production
- Producers: Rashmi Sharma; Pawan Kumar
- Cinematography: Danny S
- Editors: Monu Singh; Suraj Singh
- Camera setup: Multi-camera
- Running time: 20–22 minutes
- Production company: Rashmi Sharma Telefilms

Original release
- Network: StarPlus
- Release: 19 October 2020 – 16 July 2022

Related
- Saath Nibhaana Saathiya; Ke Apon Ke Por

Saath Nibhaana Saathiya 2 (transl. Stand by Me, Partner 2) is an Indian Hindi-language television series produced by Rashmi Sharma Telefilms. It aired from 19 October 2020 to 16 July 2022 on Star Plus. Initially based on Star Jalsha's Bengali series Ke Apon Ke Por, it is a sequel to the long-running series Saath Nibhaana Saathiya. It starred Sneha Jain, Gautam Vig, Akanksha Juneja, and Harsh Nagar.

== Plot ==
The Modi family and Urmila is seen heading from Rajkot to Surat in order to visit Kokila Modi's long lost brother, Praful Desai and his family. Gehna works at the Desai House as maid post her father sacrificed his life while saving Praful from goons. Gopi learns that Ahem, who died 5 years ago, was actually alive as Gehna saved him. Anant, Praful's third son, returns from America and helps Gehna and the Modis in retrieving and reuniting with Ahem. Later, Modis head back to Rajkot while Anant exposes Sagar who tries to harass Gehna.

Eventually, due to certain circumstances, Anant marries Gehna leading her to become Desais' daughter-in-law irking Kanak who treats Gehna as mere servant and believes that she does not have any right to rise her social status. Kanak along with Hema plot against Gehna who always find Anant to her side. Anant supports Gehna, turning her into a strong independent woman and encourages her to resume her studies. However, due to lack of trust, the Desais' misunderstand Gehna, but she gains their trust with Anant's love. Soon, Anant's ex-girlfriend, Radhika returns and joins hands with Kanak who is jealous of the love Gehna receives by the Desais' post Jamuna gave her title of 'Best Bahu'. Gehna exposes Radhika and Kanak and the Desais kicks them out. Gehna brings a mentally unstable Sagar at Desai House who fills Tia's hairline with vermillion. While Gehna is blamed for Tia's condition; Anant brings Sagar's wife saving Tia from Sagar's conspiracy. Tia confesses her love for Krishna (Gehna's childhood friend).

Kanak returns to seek revenge from Desais and extort them from their own house. Gehna and Anant get back their house and throws Kanak out of Desai House. Kanak returns with Radhika in order to pave difficulties for Gehna of keeping the Desai family united. Anant encourages Gehna her to pursue a law degree and begins working for secret mission for the country. Dr. Kumar who is a terrorist enters Desai House as Gehna's law teacher and chooses Gehna to plant bomb in tunnel. While Sagar helps Kumar in his plans; Anant decides to confess his feelings to Gehna. On the wedding day, Gehna gets kidnapped. Anant reaches the bomb planting location and confesses his love to Gehna. Later, he sacrifices his life to save the city from bomb blast.

Anant survives and returns as Dr. Siddharth Mukherji while Gehna proves Anant's patriotism presuming Anant to be dead. Dr. Kumar, Sagar and Kanak get jailed and Anant reveals his true identity. Gehna's sister, Swara and mother, Kusum return in order to extort money from Desais. Swara marries Pankaj and gets Gehna jailed. Kanak helps Gehna to break the prison in order to save her family from wicked Swara. Swara is exposed and Kusum rejoins with Gehna. Gehna gets pregnant but loses her baby due to Kanak's conspiracy. Gehna gets kidnapped by Dr. Abhay Sinha, a psychologically ill doctor, who had built a family out of his patients by erasing their memories. Anant rescues Gehna who regains her memory but is unaccepted by Desais who questions upon her purity.

When Anant questions upon Gehna's purity, she leaves the Desai house to keep her self respect at height. Anant dies in a hideous accident caused by interruption in Sikandar's drug-deal.

Gehna is now known as Kamya who lives in Mumbai. She is on a quest to get justice for Anant by punishing his killers in the eyes of law. She comes across reputed photographer, Surya Seth (who is briefly disguised as Kabir). Gehna gets Sikandar jailed for killing Anant. Later, Surya marries Gehna in order to torture her to get his brother, Sikandar out of jail. Gehna protects Surya from his wicked and greedy stepmother, Suhani Seth and her attempt to expose Suhani as the murderer of Surya's real mother, Urmila. Kanak and Suhani come together to torture Gehna and separate her from Surya. On Gehna's birthday, Gopi brings Urmila (Surya's real mother) back to Seth Mansion. Gopi helps Gehna in resolving her family issues, but Suhani still continues to create misunderstandings between Surya and Gehna. Gopi gives resilience to Gehna before heading back to Rajkot. Gehna then makes a plan with Kaddu Bua in order to expose Suhani but fails. Then, Suhani calls Shakuntala and Riddhima in order to separate Gehna and Surya. Gehna wins against Suhani exposing her before Surya and making Sikandar and Sarika realise their mistakes. Suhani repents for her actions and is forgiven. At last, Surya accepts Gehna as his wife and they then live happily!

== Cast ==
=== Main ===
- Sneha Jain as Gehna Patel Seth: Kusum's elder daughter; (2020–2022)
- Harsh Nagar as Anant Desai / Dr. Siddharth Mukherji: Jamuna and Praful's youngest son; (2020–2022)
- Gautam Singh Vig as Surya Seth: Urmila and Virendra's son; (2022)
- Akanksha Juneja as Kanak Desai: Jigna's daughter; (2020–2022)

=== Recurring ===
- Aliraza Namdar as Praful Desai: Revati's elder son; (2020–2022)
- Anuradha Kanabar Namdar as Jamuna Desai: Rasika and Hansa's sister; (2020–2022)
- Jay Pathak as Pankaj Desai: Jamuna and Praful's eldest son; (2020–2022)
- Prakash V. Wagela as Chetan Desai: Jamuna and Praful's second son; (2020–2022)
- Nadia Himani as Hema Majethia Desai: Bhavani and Dashrath's daughter; (2020–2022)
- Ashar Khan as Piyush Desai: Hema and Chetan's son; (2020–2021)
- Aarifa Siddiqui as Saachi Desai: Hema and Chetan's daughter; (2020–2021)
- Hardika Joshi as Hiral Desai Parekh: Jamuna and Praful's elder daughter; (2020–2022)
- Ankur Panchal as Sapan Parekh: Hiral's husband; (2020–2022)
- Prachi Bisht as Tannu Parekh: Hiral and Sapan's daughter (2020-2021)
- Jinal Jain as Tia Desai: Jamuna and Praful's younger daughter; (2020–2022)
- Hitesh Dave as Paresh Desai: Revati's younger son; (2021–2022)
- Himanshu Gokani as Dashrath Majethia: Bhavani's husband; (2021)
- Durga Mahlotra as Bhavani Majethia: Dashrath's wife; (2021)
- Manas Adhiya as Sagar Majethia: Bhavani and Dashrath's son; (2020–2021)
- Mohini Singh as Suman Majethia: Sagar's wife (2021)
- Vaishali Thakkar as Kusum Patel: Gehna and Swara's mother (2021)
- Rashmi Gupta as Swara Patel: Kusum's younger daughter; (2021–2022)
- Leela Tejwani as Hansa Narang: Rasika and Jamuna's sister; (2021)
- Sujata Agarwal as Rasika Narang: Jamuna and Hansa's sister (2021–2022)
- Chetna Joshi as Shanti Sinha: Abhay and Priya's fake mother; (2022)
- Faisal Sayed as Dr. Abhay Sinha: Shanti's fake son; (2021–2022)
- Ishan Jain as Rohan Sinha: Abhay's fake son; (2022)
- Urvi Gor as Priya Sinha: Shanti's fake daughter; (2022)
- Rajesh Puri as Rajesh Seth: Virendra's father; (2022)
- Pratibha Goregaonkar as Dimple Seth: Virendra's mother; (2022)
- Roma Bali as Suhani Seth: Shakuntala's sister; (2022)
- Hargun Grover as Sikandar Seth: Virendra and Suhani's son; (2022)
- Namrata Tiwari as Shreya Seth: Sikandar's wife; (2022)
- Unknown as Kartik Seth: Sikandar and Shreya's son (2022)
- Swati Bakshi as Sarika Seth: Suhani and Virendra's daughter; (2022)
- Ashish Drall as Arjun: Sarika's husband; (2022)
- Kashish Duggal Paul as Urmila Seth: Virendra's second wife; (2022)
- Krutika Desai as Radhika Kapoor: Anant's ex-fiancé; (2020–2021)
- Krishnakant Singh Bundela as Jindeshwar Baba (2020)
- Sanket Chouksey as Krishna Rawat: Gehna's childhood friend; (2021–2022)
- Sachin Parikh as Vineet Virani: Radhika's ex-husband (2021)
- Subhalaxmi Das as Jigna Dholakia: Kanak's mother and accomplice (2021)
- Khyati Vaghela as Mayuri Kaul: Samarth's wife (2021)
- Deepika Agarwal as Mona Verma: Kanak's fashion expert (2021)
- Sudhir Jain as Amrish Mehta: An arrogant model advisor (2021)
- Riya Mehta as Shivangi Mehta: A model advisor (2021)
- Sikandar Kharbanda as Professor Satyansh Kumar (2021)
- Anshul Bamni as Dr. Amit Srivastava: Senior Officer of Anant's secret mission; (2021)
- Pratibha Tiwari as Advocate Sia Srivastava: Amit's sister (2021)
- Jatin Arora / Varun Sharma as Agastya: Gehna's best friend. (2022)
- Reema Joshi as Kaddu Bua: Rajesh's sister (2022)
- Deepali Saini as Shakuntala "Shakuni": Suhani's younger sister; (2022)
- Juhi Singh Bajwa as Riddhima "Riya" Bajwa: Surya's lover. (2022)

=== Guests ===
The cast from season one were seen in a span of beginning episodes during October to November 2020, to introduce the main characters.

- Devoleena Bhattacharjee as Gopi Ahem Modi: Jayantilal and Madhu's elder daughter; Radha's sister; Rashi's cousin; Ahem and Jaggi's wife; Meera and Ramakant's mother; Vidya's adoptive mother. She returned to the show again in June 2022 to help Gehna (2020, 2022)
- Rupal Patel as Kokila Desai Modi: Revati's elder daughter; Praful, Paresh and Jigna's sister; Parag's wife; Ahem and Kinjal's mother; Jaggi's step-mother; Meera and Ramakant's grandmother; Vidya's adoptive grandmother. She is the strict and dominating matriarch of the Modi family (2020)
- Mohammad Nazim as
  - Ahem Modi: Parag and Kokila's son; Kinjal's brother; Jaggi's half-brother; Gopi's first husband; Meera and Ramakant's father; Vidya's adoptive father. He was assumed dead but he survived and only lost his memory as Gehna saved and took care of him. Later, he regains his memory and unites with his family (2020)
  - Jaggi Modi: Urvashi and Parag's son; Kokila's step-son; Ahem and Kinjal's half-brother; Gopi's second husband; Meera and Ramakant's uncle and step-father; Vidya's adoptive step father. He married her after Ahem's supposed demise (2020)
- Manish Arora as Parag Modi: Janko and Tolaram's younger son; Chirag's brother; Kokila's husband; Ahem, Jaggi and Kinjal's father; Meera and Ramakant's grandfather; Vidya's adoptive grandfather (2020)
- Swati Shah as Hetal Modi: Chirag's wife; Kokila's cousin turned elder sister-in-law, Jigar's mother. She is sweet and sensible, and always thinks about the welfare of Modi's (2020)
- Vandana Vithlani as Urmila Shah: Jitu's wife; Rashi's mother; Gopi and Radha's aunt (2020)

== Production ==
=== Development ===
In July 2020, Devoleena Bhattacharjee signed the contract for the new season with the production under plans since a year before. Amidst this, the rap by Yashraj Mukhate released on 21 August 2020 went viral and the re-run of the series Saath Nibhaana Saathiya during the Coronavirus lockdown was garnering good ratings which made the makers to immediately start production of the new season of the series and released the first promo on 31 August 2020 featuring Bhattacharjee reprising her role of Gopi Modi while the casting was not even started. On 18 September, it was claimed that Bhavini Purohit, who portrayed Gopi's evil sister Radha in a previous season, will appear in the show as grown up Rashi, her character daughter from a previous season.

=== Filming ===
Based on the backdrop of Surat, in Gujarat, the series is completely filmed at the Ramdev Studio in Naigaon.

On 14 April 2021, shooting halted due to COVID-19 precautions set by Uddhav Thackeray, the chief minister of Maharashtra. On 18 and 19 April, the entire team of Saath Nibhaana Saathiya 2 shifted their base to Agra and continued shooting there until early June.

=== Release ===
The series premiered on 19 October 2020 on StarPlus. Due to a decrease in ratings the show was shifted from 9:00 pm time slot to the early 6:00 pm time slot from 30 May 2022, making way for Shashi Sumeet Productions Banni Chow Home Delivery. It went off-air on 16 July 2022.

=== Casting ===
With the release of first promo, Devoleena Bhattacharjee, Rupal Patel and Mohammad Nazim were confirmed reprising their roles of Gopi, Kokila and Ahem Modi/Jaggi Modi (double role). Vishal Singh confirmed being approached for reprising their role of Jigar Modi, but finally declined it. Rucha Hasabnis declined to reprise her role as Rashi Modi in the new season, as her character had died in the former season and that she did not wish to perform a role in a typical family drama.

On 13 September 2020, Sneha Jain and Harsh Nagar were confirmed as the new lead roles as Gehna and Anant. Soon, with the first look of the series, Vandana Vittlanee, Swati Shah and Manish Arora were confirmed reprising their roles of Urmila Shah, Hetal Modi and Parag Modi from the former season. Besides the former season's cast and the leads, Jay Pathak, Akanksha Juneja, Nadia Himani, Prakash Vaghela, Aliraza Namdar and Anuradha Kanabar were cast to perform the recurring roles of the show.

Soon, it was revealed that the cast from the first season were only shooting for a few episodes in order to introduce the new leads of the show. In mid-November 2020, the entire cast of the former season quit the series due to the promoter's demand on having only one track and that the show completely focused on the original show, Ke Apon Ke Por.

In June 2021, lead actress, Akanksha Juneja took a break from the sets. During her absence, the show focused on Hema Desai aka Nadia Himani. The show also changed the storyline slightly due to Juneja's absence and introduced a new character, Krishna, played by Sanket Chouske.

In February 2022, the show went under a revamp where Harsh Nagar's character, Anant Desai, was killed off. Gautam Vig was introduced to play Surya Seth as the new male lead opposite Gehna. Roma Bali, Hargun Grover, Swati Bakshi, Pratibha Goregaonkar, playing: Suhani Seth, Sikandar Seth, Sarika Seth and Dimple Seth, respectively, amongst others were roped in to play pivotal characters of the Seth family. Since the revamp, the role of the Desai family has been reduced, with some characters phased out. In May 2022, Akanksha Juneja playing the negative lead, Kanak Desai, quit the show since she felt that there was nothing much left to explore anymore in her character

In June 2022, Devoleena returned to Saath Nibhaana Saathiya 2, to help Gehna resolve her family issues, and to celebrate her 10-year anniversary of being part of Saath Nibhaana Saathiya.

== Reception ==
=== Critical reception ===
The Times of India reviewed, "Ahem's mysterious presence in Gopi's life, Kokila's sass and injustice towards Gehna will keep you hooked."

India Today criticized the launch of the new season as unnecessary and on the other hand criticizing the former season saying, "During the course of seven years, the show took three major leaps – eight years, 10 years and four years. That is 22 years in total. Yet they've something left to tell the audience? Needless to say, how the show turned to be ridiculous on several occasions. Saath Nibhaana Saathiya tried to be progressive but the show was regressive to the core."

=== Ratings ===
Week and Year	BARC viewership (Hindi GEC urban)		BARC viewership (Hindi GEC all)		Ref.
Week and Year	Impressions (in millions)	Ranking	Impressions (in millions)	Ranking	Ref.
Week 42, 2020	5.673	3	8.167	5	
Week 9, 2021	7.174	5	10.411	6	
Week 12, 2021	6.578	5	9.566	6	
Week 13, 2021	6.855	3	9.960	6	

== Specials ==
=== Ravivaar With Star Parivaar (2022) ===
The cast of Saath Nibhaana Saathiya 2 went on to participate in Ravivaar With Star Parivaar, a musical competition wherein eight StarPlus shows competed against each other to win the title of "Best Parivaar". The team dropped from the show from Week 8 onwards as the series went off-air.
