= Tere Sheher Mein =

Indian television series

- Genre: Drama
- Story by: Sonali Jaffer; Gaurav Sharma
- Directed by: Pradeep Gupta
- Starring: Hiba Nawab; Dhruv Bhandari; Rafi Malik
- Music by: Paresh Shah
- Country of origin: India
- Original language: Hindi
- No. of seasons: 1
- No. of episodes: 222

Production
- Producer: Rajan Shahi
- Production locations: Mumbai; Paris; Varanasi
- Editor: Sameer Gandhi
- Running time: 22 minutes
- Production company: Director's Kut Productions

Original release
- Network: Star Plus
- Release: 2 March – 14 November 2015

Tere Sheher Mein is an Indian television drama series which aired on Star Plus from 2 March 2015 to 14 November 2015. The show was created by producer Rajan Shahi of Director's Kut Productions and starred Hiba Nawab, Dhruv Bhandari, Rafi Malik, Anjum Fakih, Gautami Kapoor, Sana Amin Sheikh and Kinshuk Mahajan.

== Plot ==
Amaya Mathur lives happily in Paris, while her parents and sisters live in Mumbai. As Rishi becomes bankrupt and commits suicide, the Mathurs lose their property in Mumbai and Paris and move back to their hometown Banaras. Hari is imprisoned due to Rishi's bankruptcy crisis. Rachita turns out to be Sneha and Dev Agnihotri's daughter, whom Rishi gave his name after marrying Sneha. She befriends Rama Gupta who falls for her; they later get engaged.

Amaya and Mantu Srivastava fall in love. Dev returns and tells Rachita's illegitimacy to Sumitra, who threatens the Mathurs that she will reveal the truth publicly. But Amaya instead weds Rama to protect her family. Heartbroken Mantu leaves Banaras. Amaya learns Kangana is traditional during the day but acts like modern at night, under the name "Kanika". Later it's revealed that Kanika is Kangana's long lost twin sister, but Amaya still thinks they're the same people.

Amaya realises, Kangana has split personality disorder, needing an operation. To collect money Amaya sells her jewellery and Rama takes up a competition fighting with the greedy and evil Tilak, and wins. She and Rama get closer and fall in love. Amaya's in-laws finally accept her after Kangana's successful treatment. Tilak kills Mantu. The show ends on a happy note as Amaya and Rama remarry and live happily ever after.

== Cast ==
=== Main ===
- Hiba Nawab as Amaya Mathur Gupta – Rishi and Sneha's elder daughter; Gajanan and Pushpa's granddaughter; Rachita's half-sister; Jasmine's sister; Mantu's ex-lover; Rama's wife
- Rafi Malik as Ramashrey "Rama" Gupta – Sumitra's son; Kangana and Kanika's cousin; Rachita's former fiancé; Amaya's husband
- Dhruv Bhandari as Abhimanyu "Mantu" Srivastava – Chiklu's brother; Uma's best friend; Amaya's ex-lover

=== Recurring ===
- Gautami Kapoor as Sneha Rishi Mathur (née Chaubey) – Gajanan and Pushpa's daughter; Dev's former girlfriend; Rishi's wife; Rachita, Amaya and Jasmine's mother
- Sachin Tyagi as Rishi Mathur – Sneha's husband; Hari's friend; Rachita's adoptive father; Amaya and Jasmine's father
- Anjum Fakih as Rachita Mathur – Dev and Sneha's daughter; Gajanan and Pushpa's granddaughter; Rishi's adoptive daughter; Amaya and Jasmine's half-sister; Rohan and Rama's former fiancée
- Sana Amin Sheikh as
  - Kangana Gupta – Kanika's twin sister; Rama's cousin
  - Kanika Gupta – Kangana's twin sister; Rama's cousin
- Isha Mishra as Jasmine Mathur – Rishi and Sneha's younger daughter; Rachita's half-sister; Amaya's sister
- Kinshuk Mahajan as Tilak Rajawat – Rama's arch enemy; Mantu's murderer
- Mrinal Kaur as Uma Kaushal – Mantu's friend
- S. M. Zaheer as Gajanan Chaubey – Pushpa's husband; Sneha's father; Rachita, Amaya and Jasmine's grandfather
- Aarya Dharmchand Kumar as Rudra Bharadwaj – Hari's son
- Beena Banerjee as Pushpa Chaubey – Gajanan's wife; Sneha's mother; Rachita, Amaya and Jasmine's grandmother
- Abha Parmar as Rimjhim Gupta
- Sunita Shirole as Baa
- Iqbal Azad as Hari Bhardwaj, Rishi's friend
- Paritosh Sand as Advocate Shekhar Sinha
- Raymon Singh as Mrs. Singh
- Amit Behl as News Channel Editor
- Digvijay Purohit as Mr. Garewal, Rohan's father
- Mohit Chauhan as A.C.P. Bhagat
- Arsh Khan as Chintu "Chiklu" Srivastava, Mantu's brother
- Bhupinder Singh as Dev Agnihotri: Rachita's father
- Neeraj Malviya as Rohan Garewal: Rachita's ex-fiancé
- Seema Raj as Mohini Gupta
- Priyanshu Singh

=== Special appearances ===
- Hina Khan as Akshara Maheshwari Singhania from Yeh Rishta Kya Kehlata Hai.
- Deepika Singh as Sandhya Kothari Rathi from Diya Aur Baati Hum.
- Anas Rashid as Sooraj Rathi from "Diya Aur Baati Hum".
- Devoleena Bhattacharjee as Gopi Kapadia Modi from Saath Nibhaana Saathiya
- Mohammad Nazim as Ahem Modi from "Saath Nibhaana Saathiya"
- Divyanka Tripathi as Dr. Ishita Iyer Bhalla from Ye Hai Mohabbatein.
- Karan Patel as Raman Bhalla from "Ye Hai Mohabbatein".
- Shrenu Parikh as Astha Shlok Agnigotri from "Iss Pyaar Ko Kya Naam Doon? Ek Baar Phir".
- Avinash Sachdev as Shlok Agnigotri from "Iss Pyaar Ko Kya Naam Doon? Ek Baar Phir".
- Rajshri Rani as Suhani Srivastav Birla from Suhani Si Ek Ladki.
- Digangana Suryavanshi as Veera Singh from Ek Veer Ki Ardaas...Veera

== Production ==
=== Filming ===
Some early episodes of the show were shot in Paris and Mumbai. The show was set in Varanasi.

=== Casting ===
Hiba Nawab and Dhruv Bhandari were initially cast as the main leads of the series. However, after Bhandari quit, recurring cast Rafi Malik became the main lead opposite Nawab.

Initially Anjum Faikh auditioned for character Amaya, but did not get accepted due to her height and later got cast for Rachita.
