= So beautiful, so elegant. Just looking like a wow! =

2023 Internet meme

So beautiful, so elegant. Just looking like a wow! is a phrase that went viral through an Instagram video. It became an internet meme and a part of popular culture in India. According to Google, this meme ranked second among the top searches in India in 2023.

== Origin ==
The meme originated in a series of videos made by a West-Delhi-based mother-daughter duo used to sell their colourful women's apparel. The phrase is part of a video that went viral in September-October 2023. Jasmeen Kaur, a boutique owner who sells salwar suits used this phrase in her presentation. In the video, Kaur describes the outfits as "just looking like a wow" multiple times. Her contagious enthusiasm and passion caused the video to go viral. This phrase is used to praise something as extraordinary.

== Reception ==
People on the internet use this phrase to describe everything from outfits to everyday activities. Popular personalities including politicians, cricketers, actors and musicians adopted it. Actor Deepika Padukone and politician Trinamool MP Nusrat Jahan lip-synced to the song. Musician Yashraj Mukhate, tried to create an earworm and actor Sanya Malhotra made a video dancing to it. In November 2023, Nick Jonas launched an Instagram post for his wife Priyanka Chopra for Karwa Chauth.

Indian cricketer KL Rahul commented on a picture of his wife Athiya Shetty's Instagram post, and said, "So pretty... so beautiful... looking absolutely wow!" In a tweet, Pakistani cricketer Iftikhar Ahmed used this phrase to appreciate his teammate Fakhar Zaman's innings against the New Zealand in an ODI World Cup match in November 2023.

Aditya Birla Group Chairman Kumar Mangalam Birla used this phrase in his note on the Indian economy in January 2024.

The meme gained international traction, with users from various countries like Singapore, Malaysia, South Korea, and Canada creating their own versions.

== See also ==
- List of viral videos
