= Akanksha Juneja =

Indian television actress

- Born: 30 March
- Occupations: Actress, model
- Years active: 2010–present
- Known for: Saath Nibhaana Saathiya 2
- Partner: single

Akanksha Juneja is an Indian television actress best known for playing Kanak Desai in Saath Nibhaana Saathiya 2 and Nidhi Hinduja Luthra in Kundali Bhagya.

== Career ==
=== Early roles (2010) ===
Juneja made her debut with Do Saheliyaan... Kismat Ki Kathputaliyaan. After that, she did many popular shows like Mann Kee Awaaz Pratigya, C.I.D., Bade Achhe Lagte Hain, Saath Nibhaana Saathiya, Ishq Mein Marjawan, and Ishqbaaaz.

=== Breakthrough and recognition (2020) ===
From 2020 to 2022, Juneja starred as Kanak Desai, the negative lead, in Saath Nibhaana Saathiya 2, for which she received several awards including Iconic Gold Awards.

In June 2023, she stepped into the shoes of Ira Sone as Nidhi Hinduja Luthra in Zee TV's Kundali Bhagya, until the show went off air in December 2024.

== Filmography ==
=== Television ===
Year	Title	Role	Note
2010	Do Saheliyaan... Kismat Ki Kathputaliyaan	Bhuvnamita	
2010	C.I.D.	Criminal Sandhya	
2010	Thoda Hai Bas Thode Ki Zaroorat Hai	Akshata Kulkarni	
2010	Mahayatra – Rishton Ka Anokha Safar	Herself	
2010–2011	Hamaari Beti Raaj Karegi	Anjali Sharma	
2011	Mann Kee Awaaz Pratigya	Neelima	
2012–2013	Dil Se Di Dua Saubhagyavati Bhava	Tanisha Bohra	
2013	Bade Achhe Lagte Hain	Ayesha Sharma Kapoor	
2013–2014	Saath Nibhaana Saathiya	Daksha Prajapati	Main Antagonist
2014	Emotional Atyachar 4	Babita Harichand	
2014	The Adventures of Hatim	Khabooshi	
2014	Adaalat	Suman Bhandari	
2014	Savdhaan India	Lalita/Riddhi/Rimi/Dr. Neha/Diana/Sarita	
2014–2015	Yeh Dil Sun Raha Hai	Tanushree Verma	
2015	Bhanwar	Nitika Singhal	
2015–2016	Meri Aashiqui Tum Se Hi	Naina Singh Ahlawat	Main Antagonist
2018	Savdhaan India	Meera Roy	
2018	Ishq Mein Marjawan	Vedika Dwivedi	Main Antagonist
2018	Ishqbaaaz	Siddhi Maayi	Episodic Antagonist
2020–2022	Saath Nibhaana Saathiya 2	Kanak Dholakia Desai	Main Antagonist
2023–2024	Kundali Bhagya	Nidhi "Nidz" Hinduja Luthra	Main Antagonist

=== Films ===
Year	Film	Notes
2013	Bang Bang Bangkok	Cameo

== Awards and nominations ==
Year	Award	Category	Work	Result	Ref.
2021	Iconic Gold Awards	Best Actress in Negative role	Saath Nibhaana Saathiya 2	Won	
2021	International Iconic Awards	Popular Actress in Negative role	Saath Nibhaana Saathiya 2	Won	
2022	22nd Indian Television Academy Awards	Best Actress in Negative role	Saath Nibhaana Saathiya 2	Nominated	
