= Mohammad Nazim =

Indian actor (born 1986)

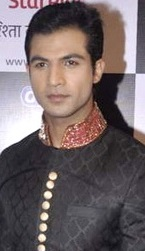
- Nazim in 2013
- Born: Mohammad Nazim Khilji; 1 January 1986 (age 40); Malerkotla, Punjab, India
- Occupations: Model; actor; singer
- Years active: 2009–present
- Known for: Saath Nibhaana Saathiya

Mohammad Nazim Khilji (born 1 January 1986) is an Indian model and actor in Hindi television. He made his television debut with Shaurya Aur Suhani. Nazim played Ahem Modi and Jaggi Modi in Star Plus's soap opera Saath Nibhaana Saathiya (2010–2017), one of the longest running shows in India. He has also worked briefly in its sequel Saath Nibhaana Saathiya 2 and played the lead role in its spin-off Tera Mera Saath Rahe (2021–2022).

== Early life ==
Nazim was born on 1 January 1986 in Malerkotla, Punjab, as the son of Suraiya and Abdul Majeed.

== Career ==
=== Early days and breakthrough (2009–17) ===
Nazim made his entry into Hindi television industry with a role on Star Plus's fantasy based series Shaurya Aur Suhani, created by Sphere Origins, in 2009 and then appeared in an episode of Sony Entertainment Television's crime thriller CID in 2010. He later played Satya in Shraddha

His first lead role was Ahem Modi for six years (2010–16) in Star Plus's Saath Nibhaana Saathiya opposite Devoleena Bhattacharjee. In 2015, he also debuted into Bollywood with the horror film Plot No. 666. He was a contestant on Box Cricket League too.

In May 2016, Nazim quit Saath Nibhaana Saathiya as he did not want to play a maternal grandfather onscreen. However, in August 2016, he returned to the show playing a new character of Ahem's twin brother Jaggi Modi and remained present in it until July 2017. Venturing into Punjabi cinema, he appeared in the Punjabi film Big Daddy (2017).

=== Further works (2017–present) ===
In August 2018, Nazim reteamed with Bhattacharjee in an episode of &TV's Laal Ishq. Few days later, he found his first antagonistic role in Colors TV's well performing drama series Udaan Sapnon Ki as Gumaan Singh Rajvanshi before his role ended the very next month. In January 2019, he was seen opposite Sreejita De in another episode of Laal Ishq.

That same month, Nazim entered Colors TV's Roop - Mard Ka Naya Swaroop as the vengeful Samru Singh Vaghela. In July 2019, he joined the same channel's love-triangle Bahu Begum as the greedy and evil Asgar Akhtar Mirza. He quit the show in November 2019 amicably.

On 19 October 2020, Nazim reprised his role as Ahem Modi and Jaggi Modi for the first 31 episodes of Saath Nibhaana Saathiya 2, until 23 November 2020, and reunited with Bhattacharjee.

From August 2021 to June 2022, Nazim played the main male lead role Saksham Modi in Star Bharat's Tera Mera Saath Rahe.

== Filmography ==
=== Television ===
==== Main appearances ====
Year	Show	Role	Notes
2009	Shaurya Aur Suhani	Anand	
2009	Shraddha	Satya	
2010	CID	Torren	Ep 607: Dead Boxer
2012	Devon Ke Dev...Mahadev	Shumbha	
2010–17	Saath Nibhaana Saathiya	Ahem Parag Modi/Jaggi Parag Modi	Lead Role
2014–16	Box Cricket League	Contestant	
2018, 2019	Laal Ishq	Sikandar / Saifuddin Sheikh	
2018	Udaan	Gumaan Singh Rajvanshi	
2019	Roop - Mard Ka Naya Swaroop	Samru Singh Vaghela	
2019	Bahu Begum	Asgar Akhtar Mirza	
2020	Saath Nibhaana Saathiya 2	Jaggi Parag Modi / Ahem Parag Modi	31 Episodes
2021–2022	Tera Mera Saath Rahe	Saksham Krishan Modi	
2024	Shamshaan Champa	Shakti	
2025	Udne Ki Aasha	Vikas Singhania	

==== Guest appearances ====
Year	Show	Role
2012	Ek Hazaaron Mein Meri Behna Hai	Ahem
2013	Yeh Rishta Kya Kehlata Hai	Ahem
2014	Nach Baliye	Guest
2016	Comedy Classes	Himself
2016	Yeh Hai Mohabbatein	Ahem

=== Films ===
†	Denotes films that have not yet been released

Year	Film	Role	Director	Notes
2015	Plot No.666	Mack		
2017	Big Daddy	Jordy		Punjabi film
2024	Munda Rockstar	Yuvi		Punjabi film

=== Web series ===
Year	Title	Role	Notes	Ref.
2024	Backroad hustle		ALTBalaji	

== Discography ==
Year	Album	Song	Lyricist	Music director
2015	Jeona mour	Jeona Mour	Gurnam Sidhu	Desi crew

== Awards ==
Year	Award	Category	Show	Result	Ref.
2015	Zee Gold Awards	Most Fittest Actor	Saath Nibhaana Saathiya	Won	
2015	BIG Star Entertainment Awards	Most Entertaining Television Actor – Male (with Vishal Singh)	Saath Nibhaana Saathiya	Won	
