= Rucha Hasabnis =

Indian television actress (born 1988)

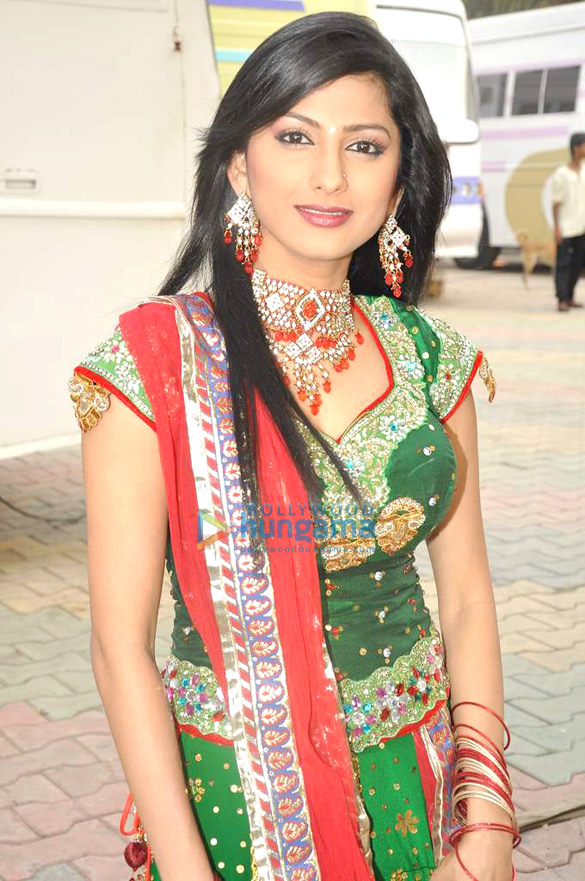
- Rucha Hasabnis in 2012
- Born: 8 February 1988 (age 38); Bombay, Maharashtra, India
- Occupation: Actress
- Years active: 2009–2014
- Known for: Saath Nibhaana Saathiya
- Spouse: Rahul Jagdale (m. 2015)
- Children: 2

Rucha Hasabnis Jagdale (née Hasabanis; born 8 February 1988) is an Indian popular actress known for playing Rashi Shah Modi in Star Plus's famous soap opera Saath Nibhana Saathiya from 2010 to 2014. Later Hasabnis took a break from acting to marry businessmen Rahul Jagdale in 2015 and focus on her family. Rucha Hasabnis regained her popularity in 2020 during the COVID-19 lockdown as musician and YouTuber Yashraj Mukhate made a Rasode mein kaun tha rap from her famous dialogues as 'Rashiben' from Saath Nibhana Saathiya which also resulted in its re-run.

== Career ==
In 2009, she began her acting career with the Marathi drama Chaar Choughi where she played the role of Devika.

Hasabnis' breakthrough role came in the drama series Saath Nibhaana Saathiya where she played the role of Rashi Jigar Modi from 2010 to 2014.

In 2021, in an interview with Times of India & Glitz Vision USA, Rucha announced she is ready to make comeback on TV and waiting for an amazing script.

== Personal life ==
Rucha Hasabnis was born on 8 February 1988 in Mumbai, Maharashtra, India in a Marathi family. On 26 January 2015, she married Rahul Jagdale and took break from acting afterwards. On 10 December 2019, she gave birth to a daughter. On 7 November 2022 she gave birth to a son.

In 2020, she returned with a small screen shoot.

== Television ==
Year	Serial	Role	Notes
2009	Chaar Choughi	Devika	Marathi series
2010	Tujh Sang Preet Lagai Sajna	Rashmi	Cameo
2010–2014	Saath Nibhaana Saathiya	Rashi Jigar Modi	Main Lead
2011	Comedy Circus Ke Taansen	Contestant	
2013	Nach Baliye 6	Guest	For dance Performance With Vishal Singh
2014	Box Cricket League	Contestant of Mumbai Warriors	

== See also ==
- List of Hindi television actresses
- List of Indian television actresses
