= Sonam Lamba =

Indian television actress (born 1997)

- Born: 26 February 1997 (age 29); Chandigarh, India
- Occupation: Actress
- Years active: 2013–2017; 2021–present

Sonam Lamba (born 26 February 1997) is an Indian television actress known for her character of Vidya Modi Suryavanshi in Saath Nibhaana Saathiya on Star Plus.

== Early life ==
Lamba was born in Chandigarh and initially appeared as Ritu Pandey, younger sister of the titular female protagonist on Desh Ki Beti Nandini (2013–14). She also made appearances in Balika Vadhu and Diya Aur Baati Hum.

== Career ==
=== Breakthrough (2015–2023) ===
In 2015, Lamba rose to limelight with her portrayal of Vidya Ahem Modi in the popular daily soap Saath Nibhaana Saathiya and continued until its culmination in 2017.

In April 2018, Lamba was locked for an important role in Rishta Likhenge Hum Naya. However, she eventually opted out of the show owing to various changes in story track.

In 2021, she made her comeback with Anjan TV's Ek Duje Ki Parchai, in which she is portraying the female lead role of Sandhya.

Sonam was seen in an episode of Zing TV’s Pyaar Tune Kya Kiya on 23 October 2021, as Suman.

In 2022, Sonam entered Colors TV’s Sasural Simar Ka 2, playing the role of Labuni.

In August 2023, Sonam entered DD National’s television serial “Jahaan Chaand Rehta Hai”, playing the lead role of Kiran.

== Television ==
Year	Title	Role	Notes
2013−2014	Desh Ki Beti Nandini	Ritu Pandey	Sony Entertainment Television
2014	Balika Vadhu	Gakashi "Gulli" Mehat	Colors TV
2014	Diya Aur Baati Hum	Shalini "Shalu" Shastri	Star Plus
2015−2017	Saath Nibhaana Saathiya	Vidya Modi Suryavanshi	Star Plus
2021	Ek Duje Ki Parchai	Sandhya	Anjan TV
2021	Pyaar Tune Kya Kiya	Suman	Zing TV
2022	Sasural Simar Ka 2	Labuni	Colors TV
2023–present	Jahan Chand Rehta Hai	Kiran	DD National
2024	Vishwastha	Aastha	Raiya Enterprise
2025	Trinayani (upcoming)	Asmita	Zee TV
