= Vandana Vithlani =

Indian television actress (Born: 1979)

- Born: 26 January 1979 (age 47); Mumbai, India
- Education: School - New Era High School, Panchgani, Maharashtra College - Jai Hind College, Mumbai
- Occupation: Actress
- Years active: 2010–present
- Known for: Saath Nibhaana Saathiya; Sasural Simar Ka
- Spouse: Vipul Vithlani
- Children: 2

Vandana Vithlani (born 26 January 1979) is an Indian television actor known for her portrayal of Urmila Shah in the long running soap opera Saath Nibhaana Saathiya (2010–2017) on Star Plus. In 2020, she had reprised her role as Urmila Shah in the second season of Saath Nibhaana Saathiya.

== Personal life ==
Vithlani is married to actor Vipul Vithlani.

== Career ==
Vithlani made her acting debut in television with Star Plus's one of the most longest running soap operas, Saath Nibhaana Saathiya (2010–2017), where she played the strong and important character of Urmila Shah for continuously 7 years from its beginning to closure.

After the end of Saath Nibhaana Saathiya in July 2017, she joined the cast of Colors TV's Sasural Simar Ka as the antagonistic and evil Bhairavi Dhanraj Kapoor until the series went off air in March 2018. In 2018, she had a recurring role in Star Bharat's thriller Kaal Bhairav Rahasya 2. In 2019, Vithlani appeared in Zee TV's Hamari Bahu Silk and Star Bharat's Muskaan.

In 2020, she made a cameo appearance in the sequel of Saath Nibhaana Saathiya, entitled Saath Nibhaana Saathiya 2 on Star Plus. In March 2021, she bagged the role of Kamini in Star Plus's Pandya Store. In August 2021, she bagged a prominent role in Tera Mera Saath Rahe as Ramila.

== Filmography ==
=== Television ===
Year	Title	Role	Notes	Ref(s)
2010–2017	Saath Nibhaana Saathiya	Urmila Jeetu Shah	Debut Show	
2017–2018	Sasural Simar Ka	Bhairavi Dhanraj Kapoor		
2018	Kaal Bhairav Rahasya 2	Principal Hemangi		
2019	Muskaan			
2019	Hamari Bahu Silk	Janki		
2020	Saath Nibhaana Saathiya 2	Urmila Jeetu Shah	Cameo	
2021–2022	Pandya Store	Kamini Dwivedi Thakkar		
2021–2022	Tera Mera Saath Rahe	Ramila Anand Joshi		
2022	Shubh Shagun	Archana		
2022	Nath Rishton Ki Agniparikshi	D.M. Sahiba	Cameo	
2023–2024	Nath Rishton Ki Agniparikshi	Jeet's grandmother		
	Dil Diyaan Gallaan			
2023	Chashni	Bindu Chopra "Dadi"		
2024–2025	United State Of Gujarat	Chhaya	Gujarati Debut Show	

== Controversy ==
Vithlani alleged that the channel Zee TV did not pay her for Hamari Bahu Silk in 2019.
