= Tera Mera Saath Rahe =

Indian television drama series (2021)

- Genre: Drama
- Created by: Aarooshee Sood
- Screenplay by: Manasvi Arya
- Story by: Ved Raj; Sudhir Kumar Singh
- Directed by: Ashish Shrivastav
- Creative director: Chhaya Chahuan
- Starring: Giaa Manek; Rupal Patel; Mohammad Nazim; Vandana Vithlani; Sumati Singh; Varun Jain
- Theme music composer: Puneet Dixit
- Opening theme: "Tera Mera Saath Rahe" by Esha Gaur
- Composer: Puneet Dixit
- Country of origin: India
- Original language: Hindi
- No. of seasons: 1
- No. of episodes: 220

Production
- Producer: Ved raj
- Camera setup: Multi-camera
- Running time: 22–24 minutes
- Production company: Shoonya Square Productions

Original release
- Network: Star Bharat
- Release: 16 August 2021 – 17 June 2022

Related
- Saath Nibhaana Saathiya

Tera Mera Saath Rahe (transl. Let Our Bond Remain Forever) is an Indian television drama series under Shoonya Square Productions. It aired from 16 August 2021 to 17 June 2022 on Star Bharat and streams digitally on Disney+ Hotstar. This series is a reboot version of the StarPlus series Saath Nibhaana Saathiya under the tagline Jodi Wahi Kahaani Nayi. It stars Giaa Manek, Mohammad Nazim, Rupal Patel, Vandana Vithlani, Sumati Singh and Varun Jain, Rupesh Kataria.

== Plot ==
The story is based in Bhuj, Kutch. Gopika is a sweet, kind hearted and talented girl. Being an orphan, she was raised by her uncle Anand, but her aunt, Ramila always had issues with her, as she viewed Gopika as an unnecessary burden. She treated her as a mere servant and made her do all household chores, humiliating her on a daily basis and keeping her uneducated. Ramila's daughter Aashi is cunning, greedy and manipulative. She is more confident and educated than Gopika and wants to marry Saksham Modi, a successful business tycoon and the elder son of the high-profile Modi family, for his wealth. Saksham's mother, Mithila is in search of a suitable bride for her son, who can take care of him and all the family matters properly. To find suitable brides, Mithila hosts a jewellery competition. Aashi and Ramila manipulatively take away Gopika's sketches and register them under their name.

Gopika, who meets Mithila at the temple, visits Modi Mansion to return her belongings, which she left at the temple. Elsewhere, Mithila tests Aashi to determine her worthiness to become Saksham's wife. Meanwhile, a fire breaks out there, trapping Mithila. Gopika saves Mithila's life and in this commotion, leaves her slipper at their house. Mithila thinks that such a girl, who prioritizes others over herself, should become the Modi family's daughter-in-law. She seeks the slipper's owner to fix her alliance with Saksham. Ramila misleads Mithila into believing that the slipper belongs to Aashi. Later Modis finalize Aashi and Saksham's marriage. Elsewhere, Ramila forces Gopika to marry Jignesh, a gully boy. During the wedding ceremonies it is revealed that Mithila isn't Saksham's biological mother. Mithila is infertile. So Mr. Modi married Mithila's younger sister Minal and had 3 children from her, including Saksham and his younger siblings Tejal and Chirag Saksham is actually Mithila's stepson and nephew. Jignesh attacks the Modis in search of Gopika and is arrested. During the commotion, Gopika's bravery leads Mithila to decide to make Gopika, not Aashi, her daughter-in-law, surprising everyone. Soon, Gopika marries Saksham and Aashi marries Saksham's brother Chirag. Gopika falls in love with Saksham but he detests her.

After her marriage, Gopika, despite being the elder daughter-in-law of the household, takes orders from the younger daughter-in-law, Aashi which leads Mithila to doubt her decision of choosing Gopika for Saksham. When Mithila learns the reality through Baa that Gopika is in fact uneducated, she ousts Gopika from the Modi Bhavan. However, Baa stops her and asks Mithila to let Gopika stay as a guest till Diwali. Later, Baa learns the truth that Gopika is the jewellery designer and not Aashi. So, she makes a plan to give a turnover to Gopika and name her Radhika. Gopika faces several challenges but in the end proves herself as a worthy daughter-in-law for the Modi family. She also solves many problems for the Modis and makes a place in everyone's hearts for herself. Saksham also starts to love her. In the meantime, Saksham's sister, Tejal also marries Ramila's son and Aashi's brother, Hiten.

A few days later, according to the headlines, Saksham died in the plane crash, but he didn't go on that flight. Later Priya, Saksham's obsessive ex-lover returns to separate Gopika and Saksham and marry him herself. She tries to do many conspiracies to break the relationship between Saksham and Gopika, thinking Saksham does not like Gopika and creates trouble for Gopika and Mithila. Saksham and Gopika both confess their feelings to one another. Priya challenges Gopika to complete her education so that she can become competent enough to be Saksham's wife and continues to create hurdles for Gopika and the Modis. However Gopika eventually wins over Priya, completes her education and reunites with Saksham. Priya is arrested for her crimes and for trying to kidnap Saksham.

Later, it is revealed that Mr. Modi and his wife kept Gopika's mother as a hostage in their house by giving her the wrong pills and making her mentally ill so that the woman doesn't reveal or remember that Mr. Modi had murdered Gopika's father twenty years ago. In the eyes of the media, Gopika's mother was the murderer. Gopika learns of this and is heartbroken, she vows to avenge her mother's kidnapping and her father's death and also to find her escaped brother, Munna, who ran away in childhood after getting embarrassed. However, Mr. Modi has a deeper secret which he doesn't wish to reveal to his family members, so it is evident that he is not the murderer either. He is arrested. Munna returns with his family and decides to annoy the Modis for which he somehow manages to get control over their mansion and business, thus the Modis are ousted from their own house. The Modis live an impoverished life for some time and struggle with their finances. Later, it is revealed that an 8 years old Saksham had killed Gopika's father accidentally while playing with the gun and this is the truth Mr. Modi was hiding. Saksham is arrested. Gopika is heartbroken. However, eventually things are settled, Mr. Modi and Saksham both are bailed out of the prison. Munna forgives the Modis and unites with them.

After these incidents, a strange girl, Kesari is sent to the Modi house. Initially thought to be Saksham and Shradhha's daughter, she is revealed to be the illegitimate daughter of Chirag and Shraddha. Aashi is heartbroken and decides to terminate her marriage with Chirag and leaves the Modi House. Shraddha is adamant to marry Chirag. Aashi does not trust Chirag anymore and decides to divorce him but Mithila eventually gets the issues sorted out. Chirag reveals to Kesari that he is her biological father, not Saksham. Shraddha repents for her mistakes once she realizes that she was doing wrong by trying to break apart Chirag and Aashi. The Modis allow Shraddha and Kesari to stay at their end. The Modi family reunites with each other and they live happily ever after.

== Cast ==
=== Main ===
- Giaa Manek as Gopika Doshi Modi – Subhadra's daughter; Ramila and Anand's niece and adoptive daughter; Munna's sister; Ashi and Hiten's cousin; Jignesh's ex-fiancée; Saksham's wife (2021–2022)
- Mohammad Nazim as Saksham Modi – Minal and Keshav's elder son; Mithila's elder nephew and stepson; Chirag and Tejal's brother; Ashi's ex-fiancé; Gopika's husband; Priya's ex-husband (2021–2022)
- Rupal Patel as Mithila Modi – Minal's sister; Keshav's first wife; Saksham, Chirag and Tejal's aunt and stepmother (2021–2022)
- Sumati Singh as Ashi Joshi Modi – Ramila and Anand's daughter; Hiten's sister; Munna and Gopika's cousin; Saksham's ex-fiancée; Chirag's wife; Kesari's stepmother (2021–2022)
- Rajkumar Singh / Varun Jain as Chirag Modi – Minal and Keshav's younger son; Mithila's younger nephew and stepson; Saksham and Tejal's brother; Ashi's husband; Kesari's father (2021–2022)

=== Recurring ===
- Vandana Vithlani as Ramila Joshi – Anand's wife; Ashi and Hiten's mother; Gopika's aunt and adoptive mother; Modi's rival (2021–2022)
- Hitesh Sampath as Anand Joshi – Ramila's husband; Ashi and Hiten's father; Gopika's uncle and adoptive father (2021)
- Minal Karpe as Janaki Modi – Keshav's mother; Saksham, Chirag and Tejal's grandmother; Kesari's great-grandmother (2021)
- Nitin Vakharia as Keshav Modi – Janaki's son; Mithila and Minal's husband; Saksham, Chirag and Tejal's father; Kesari's grandfather (2021–2022)
- Jyoti Mukherjee as Minal Modi – Mithila's sister; Keshav's second wife; Saksham, Chirag and Tejal's mother; Kesari's grandmother (2021–2022)
- Pooja Kava as Tejal Modi Joshi – Minal and Keshav's daughter; Mithila's niece and stepdaughter; Saksham and Chirag's sister; Vivan's ex-fiancée; Hiten's wife (2021–2022)
- Maharshi Dave as Hiten Joshi – Anand and Ramila's son; Ashi's brother; Munna and Gopika's cousin; Tejal's husband (2021–2022)
- Hardik Sangani as Jignesh – Gopika's ex-fiancé (2021)
- Sandeep Kumaar as Vivan Joshi – Tejal's ex-fiancé (2021)
- Kavita Vaid as Moti Baa – Mithila and Minal's sister; Saksham, Chirag, and Tejal's aunt (2021)
- Priyamvada Kant as Priya / Fake Radhika – Saksham's college friend and ex-wife; Gopika and Mithila's rival; Ashi's friend (2021–2022)
- Akshaya Bhingarde as Subhadra Doshi – Ramila's sister; Munna and Gopika's mother; Ashi and Hiten's aunt; Jigar's grandmother (2022)
- Rupesh Kataria as Munna Doshi – Subhadra's son; Gopika's brother; Rajjo's husband; Jigar's father (2022)
- Radhika Chhabra as Rajjo Doshi – Munna's wife; Jigar's mother (2022)
- Hridyansh Shekhawat as Jigar Doshi – Munna and Rajjo's son (2022)
- Hunar Hali as Shraddha – Chirag's ex-girlfriend; Kesari's mother (2022)
- Hetvi Sharma as Kesari Modi – Chirag and Shraddha's daughter; Ashi's stepdaughter (2022)
- Mohini Sapnani - School Student (2022)

== Production ==
=== Development ===
The production house in May 2021 declared that the third installment of the Saathiya franchise shall be made for Star Bharat, featuring Gia Manek. It was initially thought to be a prequel to the famous show, Saath Nibhaana Saathiya. But, later it was declared that it would be an independent show. While most of the components of the show have been borrowed from Saath Nibhaana Saathiya, few new additions are also seen in the series. Gia Manek and Mohammad Nazim was roped in for the lead role Gopika and Saksham, while Vandana Vithlani, Nitin Vakharia, Raj Kumar and Minal Karpe also joined the cast. Finally, Rupal Patel was also cast as Mithila. Sumati Singh was also roped in to play a prominent role in the show, Aashi. In November 2021 Rajkumar (who essayed the role of Chirag Modi) quit the show since he barely had any screen time and he thought that he had nothing else to explore in his character. He was replaced with Diya Aur Baati Hum fame Varun Jain

The production of the series began in July 2021 and the makers and cast began their journey with a puja and havan on the sets.

=== Release ===
The first promo was out on 26 July 2021, featuring leads Gia Manek and Rupal Patel.
