= Jeannie Aur Juju =

Indian television series

- Written by: Kumar Bhatia; Abhishek Chaudhary; Dialogues Amit Aaryan
- Directed by: Rajan Waghdhare
- Creative director: Arvind Vishwakarma
- Starring: Giaa Manek; Ali Asgar; Rubina Dilaik
- Composer: Ashish Rego
- Country of origin: India
- Original language: Hindi
- No. of episodes: 417

Production
- Executive producers: Pragat Loke; Lakshmi Singh
- Producer: Rajiv Mehra
- Editors: Ashok M. Rathod; Ajay Kumar
- Running time: 21 minutes
- Production company: Eagle Films Pvt. Ltd.

Original release
- Network: SAB TV
- Release: 5 November 2012 – 6 June 2014

Jeannie Aur Juju (transl. Jeannie and Juju) was an Indian fantasy sitcom which aired on SAB TV Monday through Friday nights. It premiered on 5 November 2012 and ended on 6 June 2014. It is adapted from the American sitcom I Dream of Jeannie. Ali Asgar plays a pilot who discovers a 2000-year-old genie, who was originally played by Giaa Manek and was later replaced by Rubina Dilaik.

== Plot ==
The story revolves around a pilot captain Vikram Khanna aka Vicky, who finds a mysterious magical bottle on an island after his airplane crash in which he finds a most beautiful and bubbly 2000-year-old Jeannie. It is revealed that Jinn Jora has trapped her in the bottle for 2000 years. After Jeannie enters Vicky's life, she creates lots of problems but at last Jeannie and Juju (Vicky) tackle the problem smartly and solve it. Vicky's girlfriend Priya hates Jeannie, as she is always around Vicky. Then there starts a most romantic, adventurous, cute love story of Jeannie and Juju.

Jinn Jora finds Jeannie and wants to marry Jeannie by hook or by crook. Jinn Jora locks Vicky in a glass bottle and he takes Vicky’s place. Vicky (who is miniaturized) escapes out of the bottle and gets Duggu Dadi’s attention. Duggu Dadi, Jin Johnny, and Vicky go into the past and tell Jeannie about Jinn Jora’s plan. Duggu Dadi, Jeannie, and Jinn Johnny banish Jinn Jora to the depths of the ocean in a closed glass bottle.

Jeannie's sister Jiya comes to stay with them and instantly starts a war with Vicky and creates trouble for him, but nevertheless both deeply care for each other.

Another evil character, Jwala, who is the lookalike of Jeannie is released from the Jinn Jail for 7 days. She has an evil mirror who tells her to execute evil plans. Jwala switches places with Jeannie and sends Jeannie to jail. However, Jiya notices there is something wrong with Jeannie. Jiya tells Vicky and Vela and they find Jwala's house in the wall. They travel to the Jinn Jail and tell Jinn Jailor what happened. All of them go back to Earth and Jinn Jailor test the two Jeannies to see who is the real Jeannie. The test is to tie a magical rope around Juju and pull the rope towards themselves. The real Jeannie lets go of the rope because she cannot see her Juju in pain. Jinn Jailor confirms that the real Jeannie is the one that cannot see her Juju in pain and takes Jwala back to jail.

On the night when the stars align into a Z shape, Jin Junoon attempts to become the most powerful Jinn in Jinn Land. He has a bird named Jinn Jugnu. To do this, Jinn Junoon needs to sacrifice an innocent and pure genie. He targets Jeannie and captures her in a cage. Vicky attempts to save Jeannie, but is unsuccessful. Jeannie disappears "forever". Vicky goes on a dangerous journey (instructed by Doctor Jeet and Doctor Jantu) to find Jeannie again and is successful. However, Jeannie reappears with a different face.

Jeannie and Juju travel back to 2004, ten years earlier, and see the old Vicky. Vicky and Vela live together. Chatur Babu is Vicky's neighbor and goes to Vicky's house to get furniture. Chatur is about to marry Durga. Chatur grabs the time machine from Vicky's house. JhunJhun and Genius bring back the time machine to the present and Chautur is surprised. Mooni wants Jeannie to stay in the past and makes the time machine's battery die fast. Mooni also makes Vela forget about the time machine. At the end, Vela is sent back to present with JhunJhun and Genius. Jeannie and Juju return to the present by recharging the time machine by using electricity outlets from the entire neighborhood.

She later returns to Jinn land to complete her course.

Because Jeannie is 2001 years old, her swayamvar starts automatically. Jinthony and Jinn Joker try to marry her, but fail to convince her.

Jinthony and Priya fall in love. Juju (Vicky) finally marries Jeannie, and they have a happy married life.

Notes:

1. It is revealed that one human day is equal to one genie year.

2. Jeannie’s birthday is on February 14.

3. Every 100 human years, a genie’s age increases by 1 genie-year.

== Cast ==
=== Main ===
- Giaa Manek as Jeannie (2012−2013)
  - Rubina Dilaik as Jeannie, Dilaik replaced Manek in 2013.
- Ali Asgar as Captain Vikram Khanna
- Harsh Khurana as Captain Virendra Lakhan Pal, also known as Vela and Velu
- Navina Bole as Priyanka "Priya" Seth
- Neha Mehta Maskara as Jiya, Jeannie's older sister (2013)

=== Recurring ===
- Amit Tandon as Jin Jimmy/Rahul Chaturvedi (2013)
- Kurush Deboo as Doctor Cyrus DR. (2012−2014)
- Jiten Mukhi as Pratap Seth
- Zahid Ali as Jinn Jora
- Raj Premi as Jinn Junoon
- Ashiesh Roy as Chatur Ganguly (2012−2014)
- Jhumma Mitra as Durga Ganguly
- Shoma Anand as Mrs Sushmita Khanna
- Muni Jha as Mr. Brij Khanna
- Daisy Irani as Veli Dadi
- Guddi Maruti as Jin Jalebi "Jinn land's License Inspector"
- Alisha Nathani as Genius
- Arishfa Khan as JhunJhun
- Karishma Tanna as Sonia/Sonu/Lambi Mirch (2014)
- Rashmi Singh as Dimpy Lakhan Pal
- Mayur Verma as Bunny Seth
- Salim Zaidi as Barfi
- Farida Jalal as Duggu Dadi (2013)
- Karan Godhwani as Jin Johnny (2013−2014)
- Simple Kaul as Mooni/Chand Ka Tukda/Chandni (2013−2014)
- Sukesh Anand as Jin Jagya
- Tanya Abrol as Jodha
- Vipul Roy as Jin "Jinthony" Anthony
- Puneet Vashist as Jin Joker
- Vikas Grover as Jin Jacky
- Javed Hyder as Chapri
