= Priyamvada Kant =

Indian actress

- Occupation: Actress
- Years active: 2009–present
- Known for: Tenali Rama, Yeh Rishta Kya Kehlata Hai, Tera Mera Saath Rahe

Priyamvada Kant is an Indian actress, writer and the winner of MTV Splitsvilla Season 12.

== Career ==
Priyamvada Kant debuted as Kaumudi with Bairi Piya in 2010. She worked as negative character Payal in 2011 Hamari Saal Leela and then played character (Anisha) in Sasural Simar Ka, she also played a negative role (Manjeet) in Sabki Laadli Bebo. In August 2013, Kant joined the cast of The Buddy Project, playing a cameo role as Kamna.

She is most known for Tenali Rama where she played the female protagonist Sharda, Tenali Rama's wife.

She wrote the concept and was the Creative Producer of the show Sethji on Zee tv.

Kant is currently running a dance academy called Dancamaze. She won season 12 of MTV Splitsvilla along with Shrey Mittal. She played Namrata in Kullfi Kumarr Bajewala.

She has now joined Tera Mera Saath Rahe, and is playing the role of Priya.

== Filmography ==
- Heropanti (2014) as Jassi
- Bole Chudiyan (TBA)

=== Television ===
| Year | Show | Character |
|---|---|---|
| 2009–2010 | Bayttaab Dil Kee Tamanna Hai | Kanchan |
| 2010 | Bairi Piya | Kaumudi |
| 2011 | Sabki Laadli Bebo | Manjeet |
| 2011 | Hamari Saas Leela | Payal |
| 2012 | Sasural Simar Ka | Anisha |
| 2013 | The Buddy Project | Kamna |
| 2013 | Madventures | herself Winner |
| 2013 | Hum Aapke Hain In Laws | Mithu Sethi |
| 2014 | Love by Chance | Mishti |
| 2014 | Ek Veer Ki Ardaas...Veera | Simran |
| 2014 | Ek Rishta Aisa Bhi | Samaira |
| 2015 | Tujhse Naaraaz Nahin Zindagi | Arunima Sinha |
| 2015 | Swim Team | Kanika Jamwal |
| 2015 | Pyaar Tune Kya Kiya | Aditi |
| 2015 | Maan Na Maan Main Tera Mehmaan | Laila (episodic appearance) |
| 2016–2017 | Santoshi Maa | Sharmeeli |
| 2017–2018, 2024–2025 | Tenali Rama | Sharda |
| 2019 | Kullfi Kumarr Bajewala | Namrata/Fake Nimrat |
| 2019 | MTV Splitsvilla | Herself, winner |
| 2020 | Naagin 5 | Chandani |
| 2021 | Yeh Rishta Kya Kehlata Hai | Riya |
| 2021–2022 | Tera Mera Saath Rahe | Priya |
| 2023 | Woh Toh Hai Albelaa | Chaman |
| 2025–2026 | Gharwali Pedwali | Latika |

=== Web series ===
| Year | Title | Role | Ref. |
|---|---|---|---|
| 2025 | Kill Dill – The Heartbreak Club | Anara | |
| 2025 | Bada Naam Karenge | Pakhi | |
| 2025 | Chahatein | Mugdha | |
