= Desh Ki Beti Nandini =

Indian political drama television series

- Also known as: Nandini
- Genre: Drama
- Created by: Rashmi Sharma
- Screenplay by: Rashmi Sharma; Sanjay Kumar; Manish Singh; Dialogues: Amal Donwaar
- Story by: Rashmi Sharma; Ved Raj; Sudhir Kumar
- Directed by: Seema Choudhary; Pawan Kumar (Series Director)
- Creative director: Rashmi Sharma
- Starring: See Below
- Theme music composer: Aashish Rego (Background Music also)
- Opening theme: instrumental and vocal
- Country of origin: India
- Original language: Hindi
- No. of seasons: 1
- No. of episodes: 132

Production
- Producers: Rashmi Sharma and Pawan Kumar
- Cinematography: Sachin Mishra
- Editors: Sanjay Singh; Sonu Singh
- Camera setup: multi camera
- Running time: 20—22 Minutes
- Production company: Rashmi Sharma Telefilms

Original release
- Network: Sony Entertainment Television
- Release: 7 October 2013 – 8 May 2014

Desh Ki Beti Nandini (transl. Country's daughter Nandini) is an Indian political drama show, which aired on Sony Entertainment Television, and was produced by Rashmi Sharma and Pawan Kumar under Rashmi Sharma Telefilms. It replaced the show Chhanchhan.

== Plot ==
It is the story of a simple, young and cheerful next-door-girl called Nandini hailing from a middle-class family in Chandni Chowk, Delhi. Her father Ashok Pandey, is a retired government employee and mother Aanchal Pandey, a loving homemaker. She has a younger brother, Siddharth who is struggling to find a stable job and a younger college going sister, Ritu, who loves the world of fashion. While retired Ashok is still waiting to receive his pension money and Siddhath is looking for a stable job, Nandini is the sole bread earner of the family, who is working as a decorating planner in a decoration company. She is not only a responsible family member but also a responsible citizen, who believes in addressing daily life social problems instead of just complaining about them. Empathy, kindness, hard work and a zest to help others are the virtues she has been gifted with since childhood. She marries Prince Rajveer Raghuvanshi from royal family which is also an influential political family. While on her way to the journey of her new marital life she finds out that her husband is being forced to become a politician by his mother as his father was also a politician. Finding her husband's interest in music, Nandini supports and helps him to quit politics and concentrate on becoming a musician. After great effort Rajveer succeeds in becoming a musician. After several situations Nandini agrees to stand for the election on behalf of her family and eventually Nandhini wins the election with the maximum number of votes and the scene ends with Nandini taking oath in front of public as the new Chief Minister of Delhi.

== Cast ==
- Keerti Nagpure as Nandini Pandey / Nandini Rajveer Raghuvanshi
- Rafi Malik as Rajveer Raghuvanshi
- Shahab Khan as Ashok Pandey, father of Nandini, a retired Govt. employee
- Suhasini Mulay as Rani Ambika Devi Raghuvanshi / Dadi sa
- Sujata Sehgal as Gayatri Devi Raghuvanshi, President of PRP, mother of Rajveer
- Manoj Chandila as Abhay Singh (political adviser of Raghuvanshi's political party)
- Maleeka Ghai as Aanchal Pandey, mother of Nandini
- Tanvi Thakkar as Divya Siddharth Pandey
- Mayank Gandhi as Rajas Raghuvanshi, Uttara's husband, Rajveer's brother, Nandini's brother-in-law
- Aparna Kumar as Uttara Rajas Raghuvanshi, Rajas's wife Rajveer and Nandini's Sister-in-law
- Pushkar Goggiaa as Sidharth Pandey, younger brother of Nandini
- Sonam Lamba as Ritu Pandey, younger sister of Nandini
- Aadesh Chaudhary as Sushant Raghuvanshi, son of Inderraj Raghuvanshi
- Surendra Pal as Inderraj Raghuvanshi, Eldest son of Rani Ambika Devi and a minister of 'Jan Kalyan Dal', the ruling party
- Iira Soni as Jeena Khurana (Raajveer's ex-girlfriend)
- Vikram Soni as Rohan (Nandini's brotherly colleague at National decorator)

== Film promotions ==
On 21 March 2014, in the 107th episode, film actor Jackky Bhagnani and Neha Sharma made an appearance to promote their political drama film Youngistaan.
