= Loveleen Kaur Sasan =

Indian TV actress (born 1990)

Lovey Sasan
- Born: Jammu and Kashmir
- Occupations: Actress, model
- Years active: 2011–2018
- Spouse: Koushik Krishnamurty (m.2019)
- Children: 2

Loveleen Kaur Sasan, also known as Lovey Sasan, and also known by her married name as Loveyy Koushiik is an Indian television actress. She is known for playing Paridhi Modi in Saath Nibhaana Saathiya.

== Career ==
=== Television debut and struggle (2011-2012) ===
In 2011, Sasan started her career with two popular shows: Bade Achhe Lagte Hain and Kitani Mohabbat Hai (season 2). She played the secretary Jenny and Arjun's ex-girlfriend.

In 2012, Sasan doing episodic role in Savdhaan India and Anamika as well as she is doing recurring cast in Kya Huaa Tera Vaada as Ankita.

=== Rose a Fame & break from television and debut In Pollywood (2013-2018) ===
After one half year, from 2013 to 2014 she get particular role in show Kaisa Yeh Ishq Hai... Ajab Sa Risk Hai as Rano in supporting role.

In 2014 she doing episodic role in Love by Chance as Sakshi.

In July 2014 to February 2017, she portrayed as Paridhi Modi in the popular show Saath Nibhaana Saathiya.

In 2018, she debut in Pollywood in blockbuster film Subedar Joginder Singh as Bacchan Kaur. Her character was loved by the audiences.

== Television ==
| Year | Name | Role | Notes |
|---|---|---|---|
| 2011 | Bade Achhe Lagte Hain | Jenny | Ram's secretary |
| 2011 | Kitani Mohabbat Hai 2 | Arjun's ex-girlfriend | Opposite Karan Kundra |
| 2012 | Anamika | Meera | |
| 2012–2013 | Kya Huaa Tera Vaada | Ankita | |
| 2013 -2014 | Kaisa Yeh Ishq Hai... Ajab Sa Risk Hai | Rano | Supporting role |
| 2014–2017 | Saath Nibhaana Saathiya | Paridhi Modi | Parallel Lead |
| 2014–2015 | Box Cricket League | contestant | Player in Rowedy Banglore |

=== Episodic Role ===
| Year | Name | Role | Notes | Ref(s) |
|---|---|---|---|---|
| 2012 | Savdhaan India | Anjali | | |
| 2012 | Har yug mein (ek Arjun.) | Shweta | Ep.No-19 | |
| 2014 | Love by Chance | Sakshi | Ep. Name- Gyaan Ki Dukaan | |
| 2015 | SuperCops Vs SuperVillains | Valushka | Episodic Roles Ep. Name- Golden Fly Mutant | |

== Filmography ==
| Year | Name | Role | Notes | Language | Ref(s) |
|---|---|---|---|---|---|
| 2018 | Subedar Joginder Singh | Bacchan Kaur | Debut in Punjab cinema | Punjabi | |
