= Kaam Chalu Hai =

- Official release poster
- Directed by: Palash Muchhal
- Written by: Palash Muchhal
- Starring: Rajpal Yadav; Giaa Manek
- Cinematography: Pathan Parvez Khan
- Edited by: Sayan Mal
- Music by: Palash Muchhal; Saurabh Singh Sengar
- Production companies: Baseline Studios; Pal Music & Films
- Distributed by: ZEE5
- Release date: 19 April 2024
- Running time: 82 minutes
- Country: India
- Language: Hindi

Kaam Chalu Hai (transl. Work is in progress) is a 2024 Indian Hindi-language drama film written and directed by Palash Muchhal, starring Rajpal Yadav, Giaa Manek, and Kurangi Vijayshrie Nagraj in the leading roles. The film is based on the real-life story of Manoj Patil. It is produced by Baseline Studios and Pal Music & Films.

Kaam Chalu Hai has been chosen for promotion by IMPPA (Indian Motion Picture Producers' Association) at the Cannes Film Festival 2024. The film was digitally released on 19 April 2024 on ZEE5. Kaam Chalu Hai received mixed response from critics with praise for its poignant portrayal of a father's journey and the important social message it conveys, while some others criticized its uneven pacing, repetitive scenes, and lack of depth in character development and plot progression.

== Plot ==
The story revolves around Manoj Patil, a devoted father whose life is shattered when his daughter, Gudiya, dies in a tragic accident caused by administrative negligence. Determined to prevent such tragedies from recurring, Manoj channels his grief into a revolutionary movement aimed at ensuring the safety of other children. As he seeks justice for Gudiya and fights to protect other daughters from similar fates, his inspirational journey unfolds, highlighting the power of transforming personal pain into positive action.

== Cast ==
- Rajpal Yadav as Manoj Patil
- Giaa Manek as Radha

== Production ==
The film was officially announced on 20 July 2023, with the poster featuring film lead Rajpal Yadav. The film is a second collaboration of Palash Muchhal with actor Rajpal Yadav after Ardh. Giaa Manek marks her OTT debut with the film. Director Palaash Muchhal stated, "Kaam Chalu Hai explores a theme often overlooked in our society, shedding light on a harsh reality. With every project, my aim is to resonate with audiences and evoke a sense of connection, and this film does exactly that." The filming was held in Sangli, Maharashtra, wrapped up in August 2023.

== Release ==
The film was released on 19 April 2024, on OTT platform ZEE5.

== Reception ==
Yatamanyu Narain of News 18 awarded 4 stars out of 5 stars and found Kaam Chalu Hai to be a poignant and engaging film, albeit with some minor flaws. Ronak Kotecha of The Times of India awarded 2.5 stars out of 5 stars and wrote "A relevant social drama that falls short of making a strong impact." Bharathi Pradhan of Lehren awarded overall rating 2.5 stars out of 5 stars, She appreciated the real-life inspiration behind the story and the portrayal of a common man's fight against social injustice. However, he criticized the film for its uneven narrative pacing, repetitive scenes, and lack of depth in certain aspects like character development and plot progression. Shushmita Dey of Times Now rated 2 stars out of 5 stars and wrote "The film's social message is important and it's equally important that it's conveyed through a compelling film. This is where Kaam Chalu Hai falls short of expectations." Shreyas Pandey of The New Indian Express awarded half stars out of 5 stars, called it "static and bland" and wrote "Kaam Chalu Hai strictly remains an issue-based film with largely familiar beats and a narrative filled with plot holes." Angel Rani of Deccan Herald of wrote "Kaam Chalu Hai is a commendable effort that raises awareness about the great Indian civic apathy that claims several lives on the road."
