= Na Ghar Ke Na Ghaat Ke =

- Film poster
- Directed by: Rahul Aggarwal
- Written by: Alok Upadhyay
- Produced by: T. P. Aggarwal
- Starring: Rahul Aggarwal; Paresh Rawal; Om Puri; Ravi Kishan; Narayani Shastri; Neena Gupta; Giaa Manek
- Edited by: Vinod Pathak
- Music by: Lalit Pandit
- Release date: 12 March 2010
- Country: India
- Language: Hindi

Na Ghar Ke Na Ghaat Ke (transl. Belonging neither to the House nor the Valley) is a 2010 Hindi-language comedy film directed by and starring Rahul Aggarwal as a Uttar Pradesh migrant to Mumbai. The film was released on 12 March 2010.

== Plot ==
Devki Nandan Tripathi is a simple, rustic man who tries his luck in the city of dreams, Mumbai. He gets himself employed at the Mausam Vibhaag, his only means to a lucrative and thriving future. The plot thickens and so do Devki's circumstances, for he pursues something that he had never meant to. He finds himself doing everything except dedicating time to his vocation. He comes across an array of city people who often find his innocence amusing and comical, but Devki realises that they stick with him even in the thickest of bogs that his life hauls him in. From the village folk to the corrupt cop to the impish goon, Devki finds himself cared for and aided even while he feels entrenched in a Na Ghar Ke Na Ghaat Ke state of affairs. The film depicts the everyday struggle of the common man in a ‘rural meets urban’ set-up.

== Cast ==
- Rahul Aggarwal as Devki Nandan Tripathi
- Narayani Shastri as Mithilesh Tripathi, Devki's wife
- Om Puri as Sankata Prasad Tripathi, Devki's father
- Neena Gupta as Ananya, Devki's mother
- Ravi Kishan as Madan Khachak
- Paresh Rawal as Inspector Velji Khote
- Anant Mahadevan as V. G. Chunawala
- Ruma Sengupta as Sonali, Devki's grandmother
- Akshita Arora as Sumitra, Mithilesh' mother
- Rakesh Shrivastav as Kamal, Devki's father-in-law
- Neeraj Vora as Mr. R. K. Khanna
- Giaa Manek as Arpita, Devki's younger sister
- Ehsan Khan in a special appearance
- Manmauji as Paan Wala
- Lalit Pandit in a special appearance
- Shweta Salve in a special appearance
- Shriya Saran as herself in a special appearance
- Jimmy Moses as Taxi Driver

== Soundtrack ==
No.	Title	Singer(s)	Length
1.	"Sajan Bawre"	Sunidhi Chauhan
2.	"Sajan Bawre" (Remix)	Sunidhi Chauhan
3.	"Na Ghar Ke Na Ghaat Ke" (Remix)	Remo Fernandes
4.	"Agar Hum Tum Ko"	Neeraj Shridhar, Shreya Ghoshal
5.	"Agar Hum Tum Ko" (Remix)	Neeraj Shridhar, Shreya Ghoshal
6.	"Na Ghar Ke Na Ghaat Ke"	Remo Fernandes
7.	"Na Ghar Ke Na Ghaat Ke" (Promotional)	Remo Fernandes

== Release ==
The Times of India gave the film two out of five stars and wrote that "The intentions are noble. Debutant director, Rahul Aggarwal has a point to make". Taran Adarsh of Bollywood Hungama gave the film 2.5 out of 5 , writing, " On the whole, NA GHAR KE NA GHAAT KE is a simple film told in the most simplistic manner. Should appeal mainly to those who cherish the Hrishikesh Mukherjee movies of yore."
