= Subedar Joginder Singh (film) =

2018 Indian Punjabi language biographical war film

- Directed by: Simerjit Singh
- Screenplay by: Raashid Rangrez; Simerjit Singh
- Story by: Raashid Rangrez; Simerjit Singh
- Based on: Subedar Joginder Singh
- Produced by: Sumeet Singh
- Starring: Gippy Grewal; Aditi Sharma; Guggu Gill; Kulwinder Billa; Karamjit Anmol; Loveleen Kaur Sasan; Rajvir Jawanda; Sardar Sohi
- Cinematography: Navneet Misser
- Edited by: Bunty Nagi
- Music by: Amar Mohile
- Production companies: Seven Colors Motion Pictures; Unisys Infosolutions Pvt Ltd
- Release date: 6 April 2018
- Country: India
- Language: Punjabi

Subedar Joginder Singh is a 2018 Indian Punjabi-language biographical war film based on the life of Joginder Singh, an Indian soldier who fought in the 1962 Sino-Indian War and was posthumously awarded the Param Vir Chakra. It is produced by Saga Music and is set to release by 6 April 2018. The film stars Gippy Grewal and Aditi Sharma and is directed by Simerjit Singh who belongs to the same region of Moga where Joginder Singh was born. This movie was a high budget film. The film is authentic to that in the era of 1962.

The movie was shot in Suratgarh or Rajasthan which is nearly 100 km from the Indo-Pakistan border, to give a look of the pre-independence village of Punjab. The additional shooting of the movie took place in October 2017 at the Dras sector in Jammu and Kashmir to give real life experience of the Tawang valley during the 1962 war.

== Plot ==
The film is based upon the life, struggle and valor of a subedar in the Indian Army who died while fighting the Chinese in the Sino-Indian War in 1962.

== Cast ==
- Gippy Grewal as Subedar Joginder Singh
- Aditi Sharma as Gurdyal Kaur
- Nirmal Rishi as Joginder Singh's Mother
- Guggu Gill as Lieutenant Maan Singh
- Loveleen Kaur Sasan as Bacchan kaur
- Kulwinder Billa as Ajaib Singh (Sipahi)
- Roshan Prince as Swaran Singh (Sipahi)
- Jaggi Singh as Santokh Singh (Naik)
- Jordan Sandhu as Bant Singh
- Raghveer Boli as Mahinder Singh
- Karamjit Anmol as Bawa Singh (Sipahi)
- Rajvir Jawanda as Bahadur Singh (Sipahi)
- Harish Verma as Commander Haripal Kaushik
- Parminder Gill as Mother in law
- Harpreet Singh as Sepoy
- Sharan Maan as Bhaag Singh (Sipahi)

== Soundtrack ==
Subedar Joginder Singh

Soundtrack album by Jassi Katyal, Gurmeet Singh & Jaidev Kumar
- Released: 5 April 2018
- Genre: Feature film soundtrack
- Length: 26:35
- Label: Saga Music
External audio
- Audio Jukebox on YouTube

Tracklist
No.	Title	Lyrics	Music	Singer(s)	Length
1.	"Gal Dil Di"	Kulwinder Billa	Jassi Katyal	Gippy Grewal, Kulwinder Billa, Rajvir Jawanda, Sharan Maan	03:30
2.	"Naina"	Happy Raikoti	Jassi Katyal	Feroz Khan	04:23
3.	"Ae Watan"	Devinder Khannewala	Jaidev Kumar	Kaler Kanth, Krishna Beura, Himanshu Sharma, Surtal Kular, Anil Sondhi, Sagar Sharma	06:08
4.	"Ishq Da Tara"	Happy Raikoti	Jassi Katyal	Gippy Grewal, Raman Romana	04:24
5.	"Hathyar"	Amardeep Singh Gill	Gurmeet Singh	Nachhatar Gill	04:41
6.	"Soora So Pehchaniye"	Traditional	Jaidev Kumar	Daler Mehndi, Ustad Shaukat Ali Matoi	03:26
Total length:					26:35
