= Devoleena Bhattacharjee =

Indian actress and dancer (born 1985)

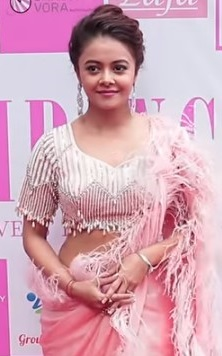
- Bhattacharjee in 2018
- Born: 22 August 1985 (age 41); Sivasagar, Assam, India
- Education: National Institute of Fashion Technology
- Occupations: Actress; Bharatanatyam dancer
- Years active: 2010–present
- Known for: Saath Nibhaana Saathiya; Bigg Boss (Season 13–15)
- Spouse: Shanwaz Shaikh (m. 2022)
- Children: 1

Devoleena Bhattacharjee (born 22 August 1985) is an Indian actress and trained Bharatanatyam dancer. She is known for playing Gopi Modi in StarPlus's long-running popular show Saath Nibhaana Saathiya. She also participated in Bigg Boss 13, Bigg Boss 14 and Bigg Boss 15.

== Early and personal life ==
Bhattacharjee was born on 22 August 1985 to a Bengali family in Sivasagar, Assam. She did her schooling from Godhula Brown Memorial English High School in Sivasagar, Assam and her higher studies from the National Institute of Fashion and Technology in New Delhi, India. Bhattacharjee married her gym trainer, Shanwaz Shaikh, on 14 December 2022. The couple welcomed their first child, a boy, on 18 December 2024. Prior to her marriage she lived in Gurugram with her mother and her younger brother.

== Career ==
A trained Bharatnatyam dancer, Bhattacharjee initially worked as a jewellery designer in Gili India Ltd. in Mumbai and was first noticed when she auditioned for dance reality series Dance India Dance 2. Her acting debut through NDTV Imagine's Sawaare Sabke Sapne Preeto occurred in 2011.

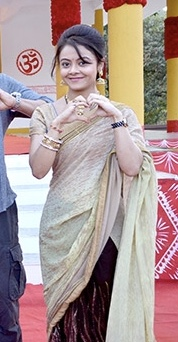
Devoleena in 2015

In June 2012, Bhattacharjee replaced Giaa Manek as the female lead Gopi Ahem Modi in Star Plus's Saath Nibhaana Saathiya which turned out to be her breakthrough. In 2014 and in 2016, she contemplated quitting the show due to the frequent time leaps, but continued the character before completing 5 years in June 2017. The same month, she underwent spinal surgery for an injury that took place on the show's set in 2013. Saath Nibhaana Saathiya ended on 23 July 2017.

Bhattacharjee next joined as a celebrity contestant in 13th season of the reality TV show Bigg Boss that started in the last week of September 2019. However two months later in November 2019, she exited the show citing medical issues.

In August 2020, it was announced that Bhattacharjee will reprise the role of Gopi Modi in the sequel of Saath Nibhaana Saathiya, entitled Saath Nibhaana Saathiya 2 that begun airing on 19 October 2020. She was seen in the first 31 episodes with the last episode was telecasted on 23 November 2020.

She entered Bigg Boss 14 as a proxy contestant for Eijaz Khan. She also later entered Bigg Boss 15 as a wild card contestant, thus making history for appearing as contestant in 3 different seasons of Bigg Boss alongside Rakhi Sawant and Rahul Mahajan.

In June 2022, just after her film First Second Chance, she returned to Saath Nibhaana Saathiya 2 as Gopi, to help Gehna resolve her family issues and to celebrate her 10-year anniversary of being part of Saath Nibhaana Saathiya. In September 2023, she join the Sony SAB's Dil Diyaan Gallaan as Disha.

In May 2023, a fake news was in circulation claiming that she was part of the cast of the controversial film The Kerala Story. According to The Searchlight's fact check, the claim was false.

In July 2024, she signed on to portray the role of Goddess Chhathi Maiyya in Sun Neo's Chhathi Maiyya Ki Bitiya, but in October 2024 she quit the show due to her pregnancy.

== Filmography ==
Denotes films that have not yet been released

- All films are in Hindi unless otherwise noted.

=== Films ===
Year	Title	Role	Notes	Ref
2022	First Second Chance	Vaidehi		
2024	Bengal 1947			
2024	Kooki	Navnita		
TBA	Tiger of Rajasthan †			

=== Television ===
Year	Title	Role	Notes
2010	Dance India Dance 2	Contestant	
2011–2012	Sawaare Sabke Sapne... Preeto	Gurbaani "Baani" Kaur Dhillon	
2012–2017	Saath Nibhaana Saathiya	Gopi Modi	
2018	Laal Ishq	Manorama	
2019	Bigg Boss 13	Contestant	15th place
2020, 2022	Saath Nibhaana Saathiya 2	Gopi Modi	
2021	Bigg Boss 14	Proxy Contestant	6th place
2021	Ladies vs Gentlemen 2	Panelist	
2021–2022	Bigg Boss 15	Contestant	8th place
2023	Dil Diyaan Gallaan	Disha Dungarpal	
2024	Chhathi Maiyya Ki Bitiya	Goddess Chhathi Maiyya	

==== Special appearances ====
Year	Title	Role
2012	Ek Hazaaron Mein Meri Behna Hai	Gopi Modi
2012	Iss Pyaar Ko Kya Naam Doon?	Gopi Modi
2012	Teri Meri Love Stories	Gopi Modi
2013	Yeh Rishta Kya Kehlata Hai	Gopi Modi
2014	Comedy Classes	Gopi Modi
2015	Tere Sheher Mein	Gopi Modi
2016	Diya Aur Baati Hum	Gopi Modi
2016	Yeh Hai Mohabbatein	Gopi Modi
2016	Kumkum Bhagya	Herself
2019	Choti Sarrdaarni	Herself
2020	Gangs of Filmistaan	Gopi Modi
2020	Taare Zameen Par	Gopi Modi
2021	Bigg Boss OTT	Herself

=== Web series ===
Year	Title	Role
2019	Sweet Lie	Sonali
2021	Lunch Stories	Herself

=== Music videos ===
Year	Title	Language	Notes	Ref.
2017	"Hey Gopal Krishna Karu Aarti Teri"	Hindi		
2019	"Ramdhenu"	Assamese	also credited as Devoleena	
2021	"Mere Shiv"	Hindi		
2022	"Thaamlena"	Hindi		

== Awards and nominations ==
Devoleena Bhattacharjee awards and nominations
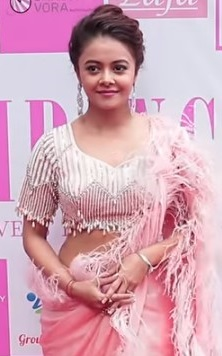
Awards and nominations
Award	Wins	Nominations
ITA Awards	1	1
Indian Telly Awards	1	1
Gold Awards	2	2
Big Star Entertainment Awards	1	1

Totals (Note: Certain award groups do not simply award one winner. They acknowledge several different recipients, have runners-up, and have third place. Since this is a specific recognition and is different from losing an award, runner-up mentions are considered wins in this award tally. For simplification and to avoid errors, each award in this list has been presumed to have had a prior nomination.)
- Wins: 5
- Nominations: 5

Year	Award	Category	Work	Result	Ref.
2013	Indian Television Academy Awards	Best Actress - Popular	Saath Nibhaana Saathiya	Won	
2015	Indian Telly Awards	Best Actress in a Lead Role	Saath Nibhaana Saathiya	Won	
2015	BIG Star Entertainment Awards	Most Entertaining Television Actor - Female	Saath Nibhaana Saathiya	Won	
2015	Gold Awards	Gold Award for Best Actress in a Lead Role	Saath Nibhaana Saathiya	Won	
2016	Gold Awards	Popular Bahu On Indian Television	Saath Nibhaana Saathiya	Won	
