= Kuchh Is Tara =

- Created by: Balaji Telefilms
- Written by: Vipul Mehta; Dialogues; Dheeraj Sarna; Sharad Tripathi
- Directed by: Ravindra Gautam; Kavel Sethi; Fahad Kashmiri; Vicky Chauhan
- Creative directors: Prashant Bhatt; Sanchita Mishra
- Starring: See below
- Opening theme: "Kuchh Is Tara" by Pamela Jain and Mika Singh
- Country of origin: India
- Original language: Hindi
- No. of episodes: 160

Production
- Producers: Ekta Kapoor; Shobha Kapoor
- Cinematography: Anil Mishra; Balu Dahifale
- Editors: Vikas Sharma; Santosh Badal
- Running time: 24 minutes

Original release
- Network: Sony Entertainment Television
- Release: 26 November 2007 – 28 August 2008

Kuchh Is Tara (transl. Something like that) is an Indian television series that aired on Sony TV from November 2007 to August 2008.

== Plot ==
Kanya Godbole, who hails from a middle-class family, tries to help her hotel employer by pretending to be her daughter and signs a contract on their behalf for a merger. But she falls in love with a wealthy young man named Ayan Nanda. She does not disclose her status to him out of fear that he would not want to pursue a relationship with her. She later decides to tell him the truth in a letter, but it never reaches him. The truth comes out shortly before their engagement, and Ayan's mother forces him to end things with Kanya. During her brief relationship with Ayan, Kanya meets his young cynical uncle Ranbir. The two of them get off to a bad start and bicker constantly.

Ranbir has detested the concept of love all his life. Tired of his constant refusal to marry, his mother gives him an ultimatum - unless he finds a wife within the next three days, she will disinherit him. He is advised to marry Kanya; though he and Kanya are outraged at this idea, they agree nevertheless. He wants to save his wealth, and she wants to uphold her family's reputation as people had been accusing her of seducing Ayan for money. Many amusing moments follow Ranbir and Kanya's wedding. When they are alone, they spend all their time mocking each other.

Soon, it is revealed that Kanya suffers from multiple personality disorder. Her alter ego is called Natasha, a die-hard feminist who strives for justice for the oppressed and abused women. Whenever Kanya sees flames or fire anywhere, she turns into Natasha. Ranbir is determined to find out who she really is, so he writes Natasha a letter claiming that a man named Ranbir Nanda is mistreating his wife. This way, he believes she would pursue him and he'd be able to see her face. Sure enough, Natasha makes him her next target.

Meanwhile, Ranbir and Kanya slowly begin to fall in love. They finally proclaim their love for each other. One night, Ranbir finally discovers that Kanya is Natasha. However, he assures Kanya's worried parents that he wants to spend the rest of his life with her no matter what. Ranbir and Kanya have a lavish wedding and renew their vows. Ranbir invites a London-based psychiatrist named Akshay to treat Kanya. However, Akshay has other plans and wants Ranbir and Kanya to split up. Akshay hints that Natasha isn't Kanya's alter ego—but the other way around. Kanya was adopted by her parents; before that, she supposedly lived in London as Natasha and was in a relationship with him.

Akshay elopes with Natasha, leaving Ranbir devastated. Just as everyone is lamenting losing Kanya, she shows up in front of them. Shanta Tai smugly explains that she went to London and met one of Akshay's colleagues, who told her everything about Akshay's past with Natasha. Shanta Tai managed to stop Akshay and Natasha on their way to the airport by attacking Akshay and bringing Kanya back. A psychiatrist states that Kanya's condition is treatable but will take time. The show ends with Ranbir and Kanya's reunion.

== Cast ==
- Dimple Jhangiani as Kanya/ Natasha (her split personality)
- Akashdeep Saigal as Ranbir Nanda
- Vishal Singh as Ayan Nanda
- Jatin Shah as Dr. Akshay Tripathi
- Pragati Mehra as Avantika Nanda
- Sudha Chandran / Anju Mahendru as Mallika Nanda
- Rajendra Gupta as Anand Godbole
- Jayati Bhatia as Pammi Godbole
- Tarana Raja as Pooja Godbole
- Usha Nadkarni as Shanta Tai
- Sooraj Thapar as Aditya Nanda
- Papiya Sengupta as Aastha Nanda
- Shivangi Tomar as Reva Nanda
- Aaditya Kapoor as Siddharth Nanda
- Vinny Arora as Simran
- Praneeta Sahu as Shanaya Nanda
- Madhuri Bhatia as Devika Kher
- Amit Jain as Chinmay Godbole
- Anmol Singh as Archita Nanda
- Shibani Bedi as Eva Nanda
- Aamir Ali as Guru
- Anuj Saxena as Abhay Kapoor (Episodic role - 51)
- Nausheen Ali Sardar as Kusum Abhay Kapoor (Episodic role - 51)
