= Rafi Malik =

Indian television actor

Rafi Malik is an Indian actor who made his television debut as Rajveer Raghuvanshi in Sony TV's political soap opera Desh Ki Beti Nandini in 2013.

== Career ==
Rafi Malik made his debut with Sony TV's Indian soap opera, Desh Ki Beti Nandini in 2013 as protagonist Rajveer Raghuvanshi.

In 2015, he played lead in Director Kut's Productions drama series Tere Sheher Mein on Star Plus.

Since 2016, he is playing for Delhi Dragons in MTV Box Cricket League.

== Filmography ==
Year	Show	Role	Channel
2011-12	Gladrags Mega Model & Manhunt	Top 4 / Mr. Viewers Choice Award	Channel V India
2013-2014	Desh Ki Beti Nandini	Rajveer Raghuvanshi (Main Lead)	Sony Entertainment Television
2015	Tere Sheher Mein	Ramashrey Gupta (Main Lead)	Star Plus
2016	Box Cricket League (season 1)	contestant (Runner up - Pune Anmol Ratan)	Sony Entertainment Television
2017	Box Cricket League (season 2)	contestant (Semi Finalist - Chennai Swaggers)	Colors TV
2018	Box Cricket League (season 3)	contestant (Runner up - Delhi Dragons)	MTV
2019	Box Cricket League (season 4)	contestant (Winner - Delhi Dragons)	Colors TV
