= Kulwinder Billa =

Indian singer and actor

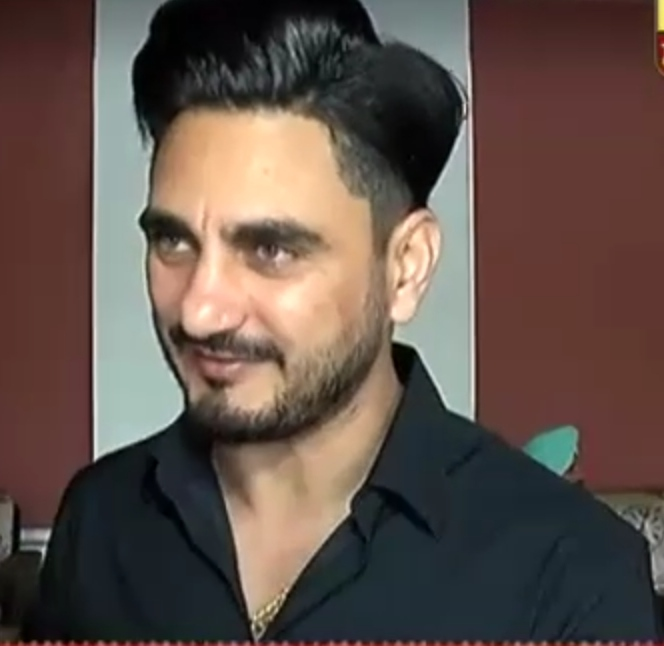
- Kulwinder Billa
- Born: Kulwinder Singh
- Occupations: Actor; Singer
- Years active: 2010–present
- Spouse: Ravinder Kaur
- Children: 2

Kulwinder Singh known professionally as Kulwinder Billa is an Indian singer and actor associated with Punjabi language music and films. He started his singing career with albums "Koi Khaas" and "Punjab" whereas his acting debut was in 2018 with Subedar Joginder Singh.

== Personal life ==
Billa is married to Ravinder Kaur and they have a son and a daughter.

== Career ==
=== Singing ===
Kulwinder Billa started his career with the album Koi Khas in 2010. After this, he released more albums like Punjab, Chehre and Addiyaan Chuk Chuk.

=== Acting career ===
He made his debut in the 2018 film Subedar Joginder Singh and played the lead role in his 2018 film Parahuna.

== Discography ==
=== Singles ===
Year	Title	Music	Peak chart position	Lyricist	Label	Notes
Year	Title	Music	UK Asian	Lyricist	Label	Notes
2015	Time Table	Gags S2dioz	3	Abbi Fatehgaria	Moviebox Record Label	
2015	Time Table 2	Laddi Gill	1	Abbi Fatehgaria	T-Series Apna Punjab	Mix and Master by Sameer Charegaonkar
2015	Chakkwein Suit	Tigerstyle	7	Preet Kanwal	T-Series Apna Punjab	
2016	Kho Na Baithan	Jassi Bros	17	Gurnam Sidhu Gama	Moviebox Record Label	
2017	Palazzo	Aman Hayer	11	Shivjot	Speed Records	
2017	Roon Wargi	Jassi X	20	Shivjot	Lokdhun Punjabi	
2017	Angreji Wali Madam	Dr Zeus	4	Shivjot	Speed Records	
2018	Mere Yaar	DesiRoutz		Shivjot	White Hill Music	
2018	Tich Button	The Boss		Ricky Khan	Saga Music	
2021	Dil Lai La	Avvy Sra		Jaani	Time Music	

=== Albums ===
Year	Album/Track	Record label	Music	Tracks
2010	Koi Khaas	Kamlee Records/Japas Music	Jassi Bros.	10
2012	Punjab	Kamlee Records/Japas Music	V Grooves	11
2014	Fer Toh Punjab	Japas Music	Jassi Bros & V Grooves	10

== Filmography ==
Key
†	Denotes films that have not yet been released

Year	Film	Role	Notes	Language
2018	Subedar Joginder Singh	Ajaib Singh (Sipahi)	Debut film	Punjabi
2018	Parahuna	Janta	Debut as a lead actor	Punjabi
2022	Television			Punjabi
2024	Super Star†			Punjabi
