= Saath Nibhaana Saathiya =

Indian television series (2010–2017)

- Genre: Soap opera
- Written by: Gautam Hegde; Sampoorn Anand; Jyoti Tandon; Shilpa Demello; Janki Vishwanathan; Rashmi Sharma; Ved Raj; Divyana; Bhavna Vyas; Akash Deep
- Directed by: Pawan Kumar Maurya; Bhagwan Yadav; Ravi Raj; Mayank Gupta; Pawan Sahu; Deelip Kumar; Pankaj Kumar
- Creative director: Rashmi Sharma
- Starring: Giaa Manek; Devoleena Bhattacharjee; Rucha Hasabnis; Rupal Patel; Mohammad Nazim; Vishal Singh; Loveleen Kaur Sasan; Tanya Sharma; Sonam Lamba; Amar Upadhyay; Kunal Singh
- Opening theme: "Saath Nibhaana Saathiya" by Alka Yagnik
- Country of origin: India
- Original language: Hindi
- No. of seasons: 1
- No. of episodes: 2,182

Production
- Producers: Rashmi Sharma and Pawan Kumar
- Cinematography: Basant Thakur; Savin Mishra
- Editors: Santosh Singh; Dhananjay
- Running time: 20–22 minutes
- Production company: Rashmi Sharma Telefilms

Original release
- Network: StarPlus
- Release: 3 May 2010 – 24 July 2017

Related
- Saath Nibhaana Saathiya 2; Tera Mera Saath Rahe

Saath Nibhaana Saathiya (transl. Stand by Me, Partner) is an Indian Hindi-language television series produced by Rashmi Sharma under Rashmi Sharma Telefilms. It premiered on 3 May 2010 on StarPlus and became one of the longest-running Indian television series. The series starred Giaa Manek (later replaced by Devoleena Bhattacharjee), Rucha Hasabnis, Rupal Patel, Mohammad Nazim, Vishal Singh, and Loveleen Kaur Sasan.

The series follows the lives of the members of the Modi family, exploring the morals and values of a typical Gujarati joint family. Initially, it focuses on cousins Gopi and Rashi and their lives in the Modi house after marrying the Modis' sons, Ahem and Jigar, respectively. After a time leap, the series focuses on Gopi's daughters, Meera and Vidya. A further leap focuses on Ramakant, Gopi's son, and Sita. The storyline includes multiple time leaps: one year in June 2013, eight years in February 2014, ten years in February 2015, four years in May 2016, and three months in March 2017. The series ended on 24 July 2017, completing 2,182 episodes.

The second season of the series, Saath Nibhaana Saathiya 2, premiered on 19 October 2020 on StarPlus, featuring Devoleena Bhattacharjee, Rupal Patel, and Mohammad Nazim in cameo roles, and starring Sneha Jain and Harsh Nagar.

== Plot ==
Gopi is an orphan who lives with her aunt Urmila Shah, uncle Jeetu Shah, and cousin Rashi in a chawl, having been estranged from her parents at a young age. Urmila and Rashi torment and humiliate Gopi, making her do all the household chores. Urmila keeps Gopi uneducated, viewing her as a burden. Kokila Modi, belonging to an affluent Gujarati family from Rajkot, decides to have her son Ahem Modi marry Gopi, though he is already in a relationship with Anita. Kokila forces Ahem to break up with Anita, and her brother Umang vows revenge.

Urmila and Rashi plot to have Rashi marry Jigar, Ahem's younger cousin, by creating doubts in the mind of his fiancée Sonal. Soon, Ahem marries Gopi and Jigar marries Rashi.

Initially, Gopi faces many hardships in the Modi household, as Kokila is strict and Ahem rejects her due to her illiteracy. Rashi, aided by Urmila, continues to plot against Gopi to gain influence in the household. Ahem's sister Kinjal is married to Urmila's nephew Dhaval after being deceived by Umang. Over time, Kokila grows closer to Gopi but does not support her desire to study. Eventually, Ahem accepts Gopi and helps her pursue her education. Gopi becomes confident and earns the family's respect. Rashi's schemes are exposed, leading to her temporary expulsion, but she is later forgiven after showing remorse.

Eight years later, Gopi gives birth to a daughter, Meera, while Rashi has twin sons, Sahir and Samar. Gopi's parents, Madhu and Jayantilal, along with her sister Radha, return. Radha marries Umang, who is later murdered by his first wife Tripti. Tripti falsely implicates Gopi, and Radha turns against her. However, Kokila, Gopi, and Rashi expose Tripti, who is imprisoned. Gopi later becomes pregnant again.

Radha plots against Gopi and causes an accident during a picnic, resulting in Meera falling into a river. Believed to be dead, Meera's loss devastates the family. Kokila and Ahem blame Gopi, who leaves the Modi house while pregnant.

Gopi raises her second daughter, Vidya, alone. Kokila arranges Ahem's marriage to Radha. On the wedding day, Rashi reunites Gopi and Ahem, and Vidya is revealed to be their daughter. It is discovered that Meera is alive but was raised in a temple under difficult conditions. Gopi and Ahem reunite, and Radha's crimes are exposed. Radha and Tripti are imprisoned.

Rashi's cousin Paridhi enters the Modi house. Rashi sacrifices her life to save Gopi, leaving Jigar devastated. He later marries Paridhi under family pressure. Radha returns, manipulates Jigar, and gives birth to a daughter named after Rashi. When Radha threatens the child, realizing she will never reform, Gopi kills her by stabbing with a Trishul 20 times in self-defence and is sentenced to 14 years in prison.

Ten years later Gopi is released early from prison. She learns that Kokila lives separately and that Ahem has distanced himself from the family. He lives in Mumbai with Meera and Vidya, along with Mansi Raheja. Relationships within the family are strained.

Gopi, Kokila, and Jigar reunite with Ahem and his daughters. Vidya is kind, while Meera has grown rebellious. Eventually, the family reconciles. Vidya marries Shravan, while Meera is forced into marriage with Dharam due to a conspiracy by Gaura, who seeks revenge against Kokila. Various conflicts unfold, including kidnappings, impersonation, and revenge plots. Gaura is eventually exposed and arrested.

Ahem later dies in a car accident, leaving the family devastated.

Five years later, Gopi becomes withdrawn after Ahem's death. Family divisions deepen, with members living separately. Vidya has a daughter, while Meera faces personal struggles. Kokila arranges Gopi's marriage to Krishna Raheja, who later reveals malicious intentions. Gopi eventually divorces him and marries Jaggi, Ahem's lookalike, who loves her.

It is later revealed that Jaggi is Parag's illegitimate son. Meanwhile, new conspiracies emerge involving Gaura, who returns seeking revenge. She is eventually defeated.

Gopi learns that her biological son, Ramakant, is alive. He grows up spoiled and initially behaves selfishly. He later reforms and marries Sita. Sameera, seeking revenge, attempts to destroy the family but is exposed. The series concludes with Ramakant and Sita's marriage, bringing happiness back to the Modi family.

== Cast ==
=== Main ===
- Giaa Manek as Gopi Modi: Jayantilal and Madhu's daughter (2010–2012)
  - Devoleena Bhattacharjee replaced Manek as Gopi Modi (2012–2017)
- Rucha Hasabnis as Rashi Modi: Jitu and Urmila's daughter (2010–2014)
- Mohammad Nazim as
  - Ahem Modi: Parag and Kokila's son (2010–2016)
  - Jaggi Modi: Parag and Urvashi's son (2016–2017)
- Rupal Patel as Kokila Modi – Revati's elder daughter (2010–2017)
- Vishal Singh as Jigar Modi – Hetal and Chirag's son (2010–2016)
- Bhavini Purohit as Radha Modi – Jayantilal and Madhu's younger daughter (2013–2015)
- Loveleen Kaur Sasan as Paridhi Mehta Modi – Jay and Veena's daughter (2014–2017)
- Tanya Sharma as Meera Modi Suryavanshi – Gopi and Ahem's daughter (2015–2017)
  - Mazel Vyas as child Meera "Gauri" Modi (2014–2015)
  - Mahi Bafna / Riti Bafna as baby Meera Modi (2012–2014)
- Sonam Lamba as Vidya Modi Suryavanshi – Antara's daughter (2015–2017)
  - Palak Panchal as child Vidya Modi (2014–2015)
- Amar Upadhyay as Dharam Suryavanshi – Gaura's son (2015–2017)
- Kunal Singh as Shravan Suryavanshi – Dharam and Durga's son (2015–2017)
- Rohit Suchanti as Ramakant "Ricky" Modi – Gopi and Ahem's son (2017)
- Shruti Prakash as Sita Modi – Keshavlal's daughter (2017)

=== Recurring ===
- Vandana Vithlani as Urmila Shah – Veena and Baldev's sister (2010–2017)
- Susheel Johari as Jitu Shah – Madhu's brother (2010–2014)
- Jyotsna Karyekar as Janko "Baa" Modi – Tolaram's widow (2010–2011)
  - Aparna Kanekar replaced Karyekar as Janko (2011–2016)
- Neeraj Bharadwaj as Chirag Modi – Tolaram and Janko's elder son (2010–2016)
- Swati Shah as Hetal Modi – Chirag's wife (2010–2016)
- Paras Babbar as Sahir "Molu" Modi – Rashi and Jigar's son (2015–2017)
  - Ishant Bhanushali as child Sahir (2014–2015)
- Rashmi Singh as Sonakshi "Sona" Modi - Madhu's adoptive daughter (2015-2017)
- Ayaan as Jai Modi – Sonakshi and Sahir's twin son (2016–2017)
- Vihaan as Veeru Modi – Sonakshi and Sahir's twin son (2016–2017)
- Pratap Hoda as Samar "Tolu" Modi: Rashi and Jigar's son (2015–2017)
  - Eklavya Ahir as child Samar (2014–2015)
- Uppekha Jain as Monica "Mona" Modi - Samar's wife (2016-2017)
- Hiteeka Ruchchandran as Jr. Rashi Modi – Radha and Jigar's daughter (2015–2016)
- Manish Arora as Parag Modi – Tolaram and Janko's younger son (2010–2017)
- Shagufta Ali as Urvashi Singh - Parag's ex-lover (2016-2017)
- Ashish Sharma as Dhaval Desai - Baldev's son (2011-2015)
- Firoza Khan as Kinjal Modi Desai – Kokila and Parag's daughter (2010–2016)
- Paras Tomar as Prateek "Pappu" Modi – Kinjal and Dhaval's son (2015)
  - Vansh Sayani as child Prateek (2014–2015)
- Sanjeev Bhatt as Jayantilal Kapadia – Madhu's husband (2013–2014)
- Jaya Ojha as Madhu Shah Kapadia - Jitu's sister (2013-2016)
- Vandana Pathak as Gaura Suryavanshi – Karunesh's younger sister (2015–2017)
- Pubali Sanyal as Durga Suryavanshi – Dharam's first wife (2015–2016)
- Pratibha Tiwari as Naiya Suryavanshi Agarwal - Dharam and Durga's daughter (2016–2017)
- Kashvi as Priyal Suryavanshi – Vidya and Shravan's daughter (2016–2017)
- Harsh Rajput as Prakash Agarwal – Naiya's husband (2016–2017)
- Ashnoor Kaur as Panna – Sonia's sister; Gopi's little neighbour (2010)
- Digangana Suryavanshi as Sonia – Panna's sister (2010)
- Gopi Desai as Revati Desai – Praful, Paresh, Kokila and Jigna's mother (2010–2015)
- Seema Deshmukh as Jigna Sameer Rajput – Revati's younger daughter (2012–2013)
- Neeru Agarwal as Mani Chatterjee – Meethi's cousin; Modis' first maid (2011–2012)
- Beena Bhatt as Meethi Chatterjee – Mani's cousin; Modis' second maid (2012–2016)
- Iira Soni as Anita Mehta – Umang's sister (2010–2012)
- Raaj Gopal Iyer as ACP Aman Verma – an evil officer who killed his daughter-in-law and tried to kill Modi family (2013)
- Akshay Sethi as Umang Mehta – Anita's brother (2010–2011) (Dead)
  - Anas Khan replaces Sethi as Umang Mehta (2011; 2013)
- Pooja Welling as Tripti Umang Mehta – Umang's first wife and murderer (2013–2014)
- Deepak Dutta as Jay Mehta – Veena's husband; Paridhi's father (2014–2015)
- Manoj Chandila as Anurag Joshi – Gopi's colleague and obsessive lover; Meera's tutor; Rashi's murderer. (2015)
- Shresth Kumar as Vivaan Khanna – Paridhi's ex-fiancé (2014–2015)
- Khalid Siddiqui as Dr. Krishna Raheja – Pramila's son; Mansi's brother; Gopi's doctor and seocnd ex husband (2016)
- Kajal Pisal as Mansi Raheja – Pramila's daughter; Krishna's sister; Ahem's obsessive lover; Meera and Vidya's foster mother (2015–2016)
- Utkarsha Naik as Pramila Raheja – Krishna and Mansi's mother (2016)
- Karan Khandelwal as Sanskar Patel – Meera's ex-lover (2015–2016)
- Hemakshi Ujjain as Premlata – Kokila's imposter (2016)
- Anju Tiwari as Chanda – Medha and Jr. Ahem's surrogate mother (2016–2017)
- Priya Tandon as Sameera Pankaj Jaiswal – Nilesh and Anita's daughter; Ramakant's ex-wife; Pinku's wife (2017)
- Vishal as Pankaj "Pinku" Jaiswal – Sameera's second husband (2017)
- Rajesh Puri as Keshavlal "Keshav" Rathod – Bhavani's husband; Sita's father (2017)
- Priya Marathe as Bhavani Keshavlal Rathod – Keshavlal's second wife; Sita's step-mother; Dharam's obsessive lover (2017)
- Puneett Chouksey as Karan Kapoor – Dharam's business partner (2017)
- Nutan Rai as Shanella – Ramakant's ex-lover (2017)
- Payal Ghosh as Radhika – Jaggi's bride (2016)
- Siddharth Sen as ACP Ritesh Parmar (2016)
- Soni Singh as Karishma Shregill – Rashi's colleague (2010)
- Garima Tiwari as Sonal – Damini's daughter; Jigar's ex-fiancée (2010)
- Akanksha Juneja as Daksha – Savita's daughter; Jigar's childhood friend (2013)
- Gurpreet Kaur as Neelam / Kusum – A woman who came in as a maid to create trouble for the Modis (2012)

=== Guest appearances ===
Actor	Character	Year(s)	Notes
Parul Chauhan	Ragini Rajvansh	2010	From Sapna Babul Ka... Bidaai
Sara Khan	Sadhna Rajvansh	2010	From Sapna Babul Ka... Bidaai
Harshad Chopda	Anurag Ganguly	2010	From Tere Liye
Anupriya Kapoor	Tani Ganguly	2010	From Tere Liye
Hina Khan	Akshara Singhania	2012	From Yeh Rishta Kya Kehlata Hai
Divyanka Tripathi	Ishita Raman Bhalla	2014	From Yeh Hai Mohabbatein
Shah Rukh Khan	Raj Bakshi	2015	To promote Dilwale
Kajol	Meera Malik	2015	To promote Dilwale
Kriti Sanon	Ishita Malik	2015	To promote Dilwale
Varun Dhawan	Veer Bakshi	2015	To promote Dilwale

== Production ==
=== Casting ===
In May 2012, lead actress Giaa Manek signed to appear on the reality show Jhalak Dikhhla Jaa on rival network Colors TV. The producers of Saath Nibhaana Saathiya objected, stating that Manek was under contract with their network and that participating in a reality show could affect her on-screen image as a soft-spoken character. The producers took the matter to the Association of Motion Pictures and TV Programme Producers (AMPTPP) and the Cine and TV Artistes' Association (CINTAA) for arbitration. Members of CINTAA held meetings with Manek and asked her to quit the reality show. However, she declined, and StarPlus replaced her with Devoleena Bhattacharjee.

In January 2014, Rucha Hasabnis, who portrayed Rashi, confirmed her plans to quit the series during that year. When she decided to leave acting, the makers wrote her character out of the series by killing her off.

In September 2015, Lovey Sasan, who played Paridhi, left the series as she did not want to portray a mother on screen. She later returned to the show in March 2016 after being approached again by the makers.

In May 2016, Mohammad Nazim, who played Ahem, exited the show. According to a member of the production crew, the decision was made due to storyline changes involving a time leap and the reluctance of actors to portray older roles:

Since the existing key actors aired their reservations about playing grandparents, the creatives had no option but to put the time leap on hold. Something drastic needed to be done to liven up the storyline. After brainstorming, the best idea seemed to be to kill off Ahem's character, so that a new man could be introduced in protagonist Gopi's life to take the story forward.

Khalid Siddiqui was cast opposite Bhattacharjee as Krishna in May 2016. As their storyline led to a decline in ratings, Nazim returned to the series in July 2016 as Jaggi, a look-alike and Ahem's illegitimate half-brother. The storyline subsequently focused on his character and Bhattacharjee's role.

=== Filming ===
Set in Gujarat, the series was primarily filmed on sets in Mira Road near Mumbai. The exterior shots of the Modi mansion were filmed at Shubham Villa on Madh Island. In December 2012, a sequence was shot in Bhuj, Gujarat, over ten days.

Some episodes were also filmed in international locations, including Switzerland in May 2011 and Singapore in February and March 2017. The United States was initially considered as a filming location, but was later replaced by Singapore due to budget constraints.

== Reboot series ==
On 26 May 2021, Shoonya Square Productions announced a reboot of Saath Nibhaana Saathiya, featuring original cast members including Giaa Manek, Mohammad Nazim, Rupal Patel, and Vandana Vithlani reprising their roles.

Along with these actors, several new characters were introduced, following a similar concept of a Gujarati joint family. The series aired on Star Bharat, the sister channel of StarPlus.

In early July 2021, the title was finalised as Tera Mera Saath Rahe. On 25 July 2021, the first promotional teaser was released, featuring Giaa Manek and Rupal Patel.

The reboot series aired from 16 August 2021 to 17 June 2022.

== Dubbed versions ==
The series was dubbed in Telugu as Kodala Kodala Koduku Pellamaa and aired on Star Maa, and in Vietnamese as Âm Mưu Và Tình Yêu on THVL1.

It was also dubbed in Indonesian and aired under the title Gopi (named after the main character) from 15 September 2016 to 19 April 2017.

In Bulgaria, the series was dubbed in Bulgarian as Остани с мен and aired on Diema Family.

The series was dubbed in Turkish as Masum and aired on Kanal 7 from March 2020 to 30 July 2021. It was also broadcast in Romania as Suflete Trădate on National TV.

Saath Nibhaana Saathiya also aired in Pakistan on Urdu 1 and H Now Entertainment, but was later discontinued following a ban on Indian television content.

The series was broadcast in Sri Lanka, dubbed in Sinhala as Mage Sanda Obai on Swarnavahini.

== Reception ==
=== Criticism ===
Hindustan Times praised the series for casting newcomers; however, it criticized the series, stating, "The loud clothes and backward settings induce a pukey sensation. There's serious amount of overacting involved by the actors, whether they play protagonists or mums and dads. It’s too old fashioned and boring".

=== Ratings ===
Despite low viewership in May 2010, the series' viewership increased gradually, and it eventually became one of the top Hindi television shows of its time. In November 2010, it occupied the top position with a 5.3 TVR. As the ratings increased, it was praised by Hindustan Times for redefining the 7:00 pm (IST) slot as prime time.

In the first week of 2011, it was the most-watched Hindi GEC (general entertainment channel) show with a 6.3 TVR. In the week of 26 March 2011, it occupied the fourth position with a 5 TVR. In week 13 of 2011, it was at the third position with a 5.31 TVR. In the week of 9 April 2011, it was at the second position with a 4.96 TVR. In the week of 3 September 2011, it topped the charts with a 6.3 TVR. In week 43 of 2011, it was at the top position with a 6.5 TVR. In December, the series achieved its highest rating of 7.58 TVR, becoming the most-watched Hindi GEC show in that week for that specific timeslot. In the week of 3 December 2011, it maintained its top position, garnering a 6.26 TVR. Overall, it was the most-watched Indian Hindi television show of 2011.

It maintained its first position in the first week of 2012, garnering a 6 TVR. From 7 to 13 May 2012, it occupied the first position with a 5+ TVR, surpassing Yeh Rishta Kya Kehlata Hai, which had held the position the previous week. In the week of 21 July 2012, it was at the sixth position with a 2.9 TVR. In the last six months of 2012, ratings dipped, averaging between 3+ and 6 TVR, though it remained one of the most-watched Hindi GEC shows. In mid-December 2012, it was at the third position with a 4.3 TVR.

In June 2013, it was the sixth most-watched Hindi GEC fiction show with a TVR of 2.6. In weeks 43 and 44, it garnered 7.4 and 7.5 million viewers, respectively. Overall, in 2013, it became the seventh most-watched Indian Hindi television program with an average viewership of 6.4 million and a peak of 8.7 million.

In week 4 of 2014, it garnered a rating of 4.6 TVR. In week 49, it was in the third position with a 3.9 TVR. Overall, it continued to maintain its position in the weekly list of the top 10 Hindi GECs during 2014.

In the second week of July 2015, it was at the top position. In week 32 of 2015, it was the most-watched show with a 4 TVR, while the previous week, it shared the first position with Kumkum Bhagya, garnering a 3.8 TVR. From weeks 33 to 35, it garnered 3.6, 3.4, and 3.6 TVR, maintaining its position in the top five shows. In the second week of September 2015, it was at the second position with a 4.3 TVR. In 2015, it maintained its weekly position in the top ten watched Hindi GEC shows, ranging between 3.5 and 4 TVR.

In week 4 of 2016, it garnered a TRP of 3.5, occupying the third position. In the week ending 29 April 2016, it was at the third position with 10.51 million impressions, and the following week at the fourth position with 10.25 million impressions. In week 26, it was at the third position with 9.386 million impressions. In week 35, it occupied the second position with 10.68 million impressions. In week 41, it was at the third position with 10.074 million impressions.

In week 4 of 2017, it was at the seventh position in urban areas. Maintaining its position in the top ten programs for weeks after the premiere, viewership dropped in 2017, with the series moving out of the top ten Hindi GECs. In week 27 of 2017, it garnered 6.7 million impressions and occupied the twelfth position.

The rerun of the series on Star Utsav during the COVID-19 lockdown in 2020 became one of the top five most-watched Hindi GEC shows.

== In popular culture ==
A clip from an episode where the lead character Gopi (Giaa Manek) washes a laptop went viral and was subjected to trolling and criticism.

On 21 August 2020, music composer Yashraj Mukhate uploaded a remix video featuring characters Kokila (Rupal Patel), Rashi (Rucha Hasabnis), and Gopi (Giaa Manek). It added a rap beat to a scene where Kokila scolds Rashi for putting an empty pressure cooker on the stove without the chana (chickpeas). The video quickly garnered over 16.7 million views on Instagram and 95 million views on YouTube as of 31 December 2025, and memes related to the remix also trended.

== Awards ==
Award	Year	Award name	Recipient	Reference
Indian Television Academy Awards	2011	Best Actress Popular	Giaa Manek	
Indian Television Academy Awards	2011	Best Show Popular	Saath Nibhaana Saathiya	
Indian Telly Awards	2012	Best Actress in a Lead Role	Giaa Manek	
Indian Telly Awards	2012	Best Actress in a Supporting Role	Rupal Patel	
Gold Awards	2012	Best Actress in a Supporting Role	Rupal Patel	
Indian Television Academy Awards	2013	Best Actress Popular	Devoleena Bhattacharjee	
Gold Awards	2014	Best Actor in a Supporting Role	Vishal Singh	
Indian Television Academy Awards	2015	Best Serial Drama	Saath Nibhaana Saathiya	
Indian Telly Awards	2015	Best Daily Series	Saath Nibhaana Saathiya	
Indian Telly Awards	2015	Best Actress in a Lead Role	Devoleena Bhattacharjee	
Gold Awards	2015	Best Television Show (Fiction)	Saath Nibhaana Saathiya	
BIG Star Entertainment Awards	2015	Most Entertaining Television Actor (Female)	Devoleena Bhattacharjee	
BIG Star Entertainment Awards	2015	Most Entertaining Television Actor (Male)	Mohammad Nazim	
Gold Awards	2016	Best Actress in a Lead Role	Devoleena Bhattacharjee	
Gold Awards	2016	Popular Bahu on Indian Television	Devoleena Bhattacharjee	
Lion Gold Awards	2018	Best Actor in a Supporting Role	Amar Upadhyay	
