= Giaa Manek =

Indian actress (Born: 1986)

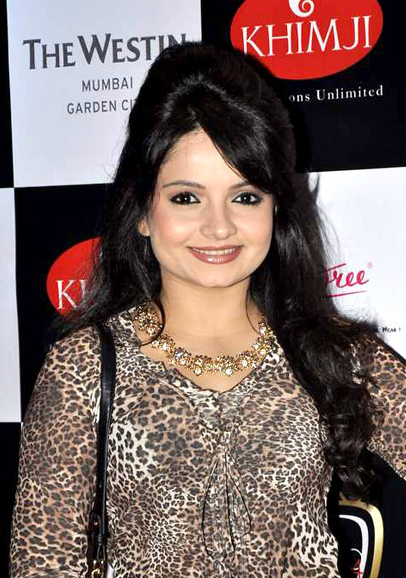
- Manek at the launch of Telly Calendar 2014
- Born: 18 February 1986 (age 40); Ahmedabad, Gujarat, India
- Occupation: Actress
- Years active: 2010–present
- Known for: Saath Nibhaana Saathiya; Jeannie Aur Juju; Tera Mera Saath Rahe
- Spouse: Varun Jain (m. 2025)

Giaa Manek is an Indian actress known for working in Hindi television. She is best known for her roles in Saath Nibhaana Saathiya, Jeannie Aur Juju and Tera Mera Saath Rahe. In 2012, she participated in Jhalak Dikhhla Jaa 5.

== Early life ==
Manek was born on 18 February 1986 in Ahmedabad, Gujarat, India. She is of Gujarati descent.

== Career ==
Manek started her career in 2010, when she joined the cast of Saath Nibhaana Saathiya as Gopi. She faced a scheduling difficulty in 2012 when she was offered a spot on the dance reality show Jhalak Dikhhla Jaa 5 on Colors TV. Balancing the demands of the dance show with her ongoing role in Saath Nibhaana Saathiya proved challenging, ultimately leading to her decision to leave the soap opera.

In 2012, she participated in a reality show Jhalak Dikhhla Jaa 5 and post the show was cast on Jeannie Aur Juju as Jeannie. In 2019, she was temporarily cast on Zee TV's Mahmohini as Gopika. From 2021 to 2022, she played the role of Gopika Modi in the show Tera Mera Saath Rahe, the reboot series of Saath Nibhaana Saathiya.

== Filmography ==
=== Films ===
Year	Title	Role	Ref.
2010	Na Ghar Ke Na Ghaat Ke	Daughter of Sankata Prasad Tripathi	
2024	Kaam Chalu Hai	Radha	

=== Television ===
Year	Title	Role	Notes	Ref(s)
2010–2012	Saath Nibhaana Saathiya	Gopi Modi		
2012	Jhalak Dikhhla Jaa 5	Herself	9th place	
2012	Balika Vadhu	Herself	Special dance performance	
2012	Na Bole Tum Na Maine Kuch Kaha	Herself	Cameo	
2012–2014	Jeannie Aur Juju	Jeannie		
2014	Ajab Gajab Ghar Jamai	Menaka	Special appearance	
2014	Mahisagar	Mira	Guest	
2015	Badi Dooooor Se Aaye Hai	Shanti Roy	Cameo	
2016	Pesbukers	Herself/Gopi	Guest	
2016	Gara Gara Duyung	Herself/Gopi	Guest	
2016	Jin & Jun Makin Gokil	Jin Giamatika	Guest	
2019	Manmohini	Gopika		
2021	Pesbukers	Herself/Gopi		
2021–2022	Tera Mera Saath Rahe	Gopika Modi		

== Accolades ==
Year	Award	Category	Work	Result
2011	Indian Television Academy Awards	Best Actress (Popular)	Saath Nibhaana Saathiya	Won
2011	BIG Star Entertainment Awards	Most Entertaining Television Actor - Female	Saath Nibhaana Saathiya	Won
2012	Indian Telly Awards	Best Actress in a Lead Role	Saath Nibhaana Saathiya	Won
2013	Indian Telly Awards	Best Actress in Comedy Role	Jeannie Aur Juju	Won
