= Ira Sone =

Indian television actress

- Born: 4 July 1989 (age 37); Mumbai,Maharashtra, India
- Occupation: Actress
- Years active: 2007–present

Ira Sone (previously Iira Soni) is an Indian television actress. She played the role of Shanaya in Woodpecker (Ullu webseries) and Jeena in Desh Ki Beti Nandini.

She has premature ovarian failure.

== Television ==
- Kumkum – Ek Pyara Sa Bandhan as Neeti Damani / Neeti Rahul Wadhwa (2007–2008)
- Woh Rehne Waali Mehlon Ki as Riya Mehra
- Teen Bahuraaniyaan as Riya Gheewala
- Raja Ki Aayegi Baraat as Rajkumari Nandini (2009)
- Saat Phere – Saloni Ka Safar as Kamini Singh (2009)
- Sabki Laadli Bebo as Simran Kapoor / Simran Karan Oberoi (2009)
- Saath Nibhaana Saathiya as Anita Mehta (2010; 2012)
- Geet – Hui Sabse Parayi as Nitya (2010)
- Sawaare Sabke Sapne... Preeto as Ishmeet "Ishu" Dhillon / Ishmeet Dhruv Ahluwalia (2011–2012)
- Desh Ki Beti Nandini as Jeena Khurana (2013)
- Kundali Bhagya as Nidhi "Nidz" Hinduja Luthra (2023)

== Web Series ==
- Ullu Charmsukh - Sauda as Sumedha (2019)
- Ullu Woodpecker as Shanaya (2020)
