= Rupal Patel =

Indian television actress (Born: 1968)

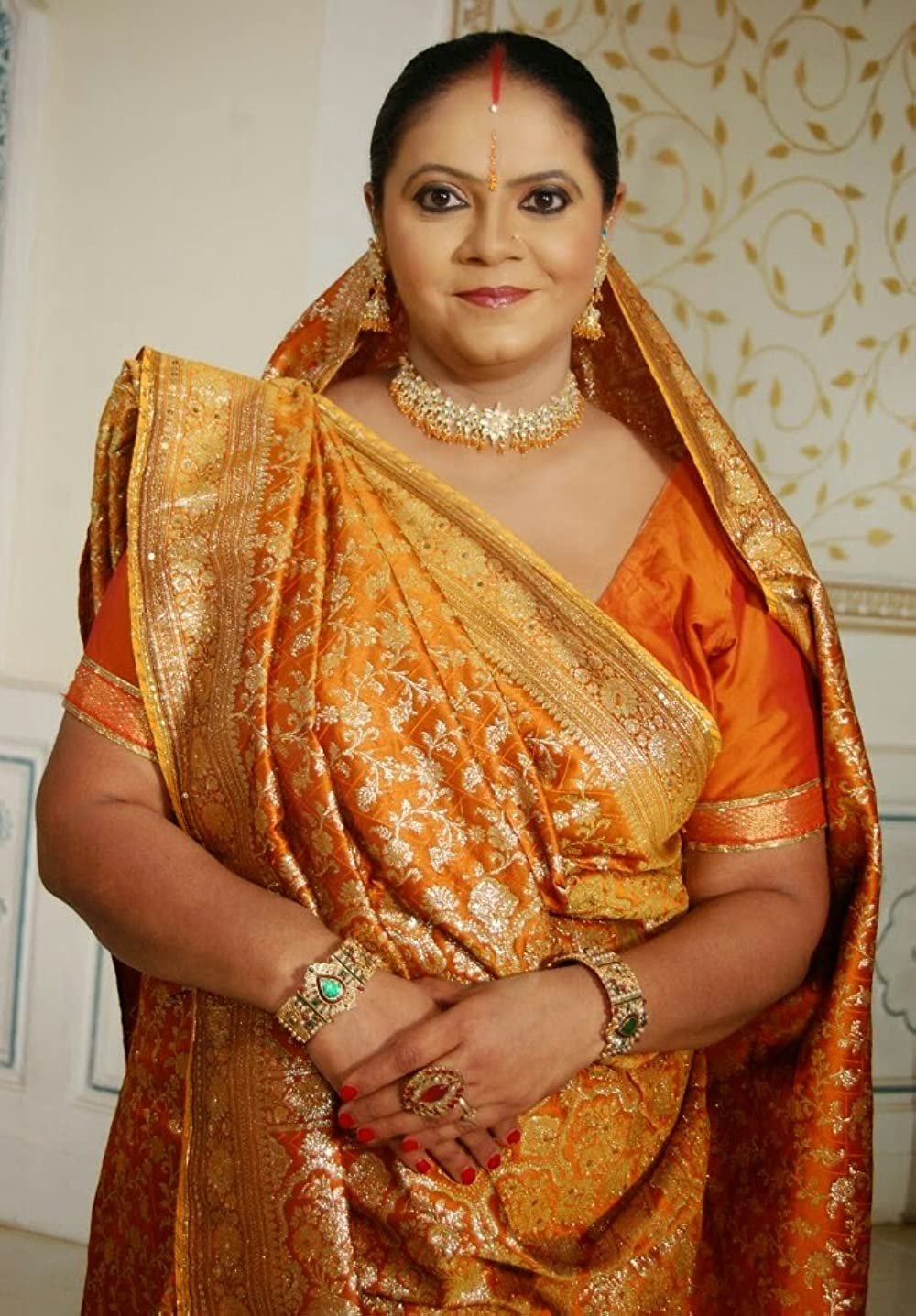
- Patel as Kokila in Star Plus Saath Nibhaana Saathiya in 2012
- Born: 1968 (age 57–58); Bombay, Maharashtra, India
- Education: Bombay University (B.Com); National School of Drama (MFA)
- Occupation: Actress
- Years active: 1991–present
- Known for: Saath Nibhaana Saathiya; Yeh Rishtey Hain Pyaar Ke
- Spouse: Radhakrishna Dutta

Rupal Patel Dutta is an Indian actress. She is known for her character of Kokila Modi in the soap opera Saath Nibhaana Saathiya (2010–2017), one of the longest-running Indian TV series. Her other notable roles include playing Meenakshi Rajvansh in Yeh Rishtey Hain Pyaar Ke and Mithila Modi in Tera Mera Saath Rahe.

== Early life ==
Born in 1967 or 1968 in Bombay, Patel is a Gujarati and was trained in acting at the National School of Drama in New Delhi apart from having a degree in Commerce. She owns a theatre group, Panorama Art Theatres, which is involved in children's plays. She is married to actor Radhakrishna Dutta.

== Acting career ==
=== Early career (1991–2009) ===
Patel first decided to test her fate in Bollywood, and debuted there via a minor role in the 1991 film Antarnaad. She subsequently enacted parts in other Bollywood films like Suraj Ka Satvan Ghoda (1992), Papeeha (1993), Mammo (1994) and Samar (1999). Some of these films were directed by Shyam Benegal.

After her stint in Bollywood, Patel ventured in 2001 into the Hindi television industry playing the role of Lakhi in Zarina Mehta's Shagun on Star Plus. She was cast as Aashalata in Sau Dada Sasuna in 2002, and later featured in a few episodes of the crime thriller show Crime Patrol on Sony Entertainment Television. After a gap in her career, she played Vrinda in Cinevistaas Limited production Jaane Kya Baat Hui on Colors TV in 2009.

=== Television appearances (2010–present) ===
From 2010 to 2017, Patel became known for her performance in Rashmi Sharma's blockbuster soap Saath Nibhaana Saathiya on Star Plus as the strict Kokila Modi.

In January 2019, she signed a cameo appearance in Prateek Sharma's Manmohini on Zee TV as Usha/Kubarjra. From March 2019 to October 2020, she portrayed the grey character of Meenakshi Rajvansh Kapadia in Director's Kut Productions television show Yeh Rishtey Hain Pyaar Ke broadcast on Star Plus.

In October 2020, Patel reprised her character as Kokila Modi in the second season of Saath Nibhaana Saathiya entitled Saath Nibhaana Saathiya 2 which replaced Yeh Rishtey Hain Pyaar Ke. She was seen in 31 episodes of the show, as it was an introductory part. She appeared as a guest in Gangs of Filmistaan.

== Other works ==
Patel is an ambassador for the Swachh Bharat India project and works for it; she received honour twice from Indian PM Narendra Modi for her works. One of them, in the form of a letter.

== Filmography ==
=== Films ===
- Mehak (1985)
- Antarnaad (1991)
- Suraj Ka Satvan Ghoda (1992)
- Papeeha (1993)
- Mammo (1994)
- Samar (1999)
- Jaago (2004) – Cameo
- Pehchaan: The Face of Truth (2005)
- Sambar Salsa (2007) – Art Director

=== Television ===
Year	Title	Role	Notes
1999-2000	Gubbare	Sindhi Lady in episode "Masala Maami"	
2001	Shagun	Lakhi	
2002	Sau Dada Sasuna	Aashalata Sheth	
2009	Jaane Kya Baat Hui	Vrinda	
2010–2017	Saath Nibhaana Saathiya	Kokila Desai Modi	
2019	Manmohini	Kubarjra/Usha	Cameo
2019–20	Yeh Rishtey Hain Pyaar Ke	Meenakshi Rajvansh Kapadia	
2020	Saath Nibhaana Saathiya 2	Kokila Desai Modi	Episode 1-31
2020	Gangs of Filmistaan	Kokila Desai Modi	Guest
2021–2022	Tera Mera Saath Rahe	Mithila Modi	
2024	Nath – Rishton Ki Agnipariksha	Kailashi Devi Pratapsingh	
