= Yashraj Mukhate =

Indian music producer and composer (born 1995)

- Born: 28 November 1995 (age 30); Chhatrapati Sambhajinagar, Maharashtra, India
- Genres: Electronic music; Spoof Songs
- Occupations: Music producer; YouTuber
- Years active: 2010–present

YouTube information
- Channel: Yashraj Mukhate
- Subscribers: 5.22 million
- Views: 930 million
- Last updated: 4 February 2025

Yashraj Mukhate (born 28 November 1995), is an Indian music producer, composer, YouTuber and social media personality. He is best known for his viral parodical video where he set rap beats to a scene featured in the television soap opera Saath Nibhaana Saathiya in August 2020.

== Career ==
Born in Chhatrapati Sambhajinagar (formerly Aurangabad), Maharashtra, Mukhate completed his schooling from Holy Cross English High School Aurangabad. Mukhate pursued his career in engineering and had also shown an interest in music. He began by exploiting his music composition in social media with spoof videos. In August 2020, he uploaded an edited video which added a rap song to a dialogue delivery by Rupal Patel who played the role of Kokila in the television soap opera Saath Nibhaana Saathiya. The video quickly garnered 3 million views on Instagram and created a spate of related memes. The reason for his sudden popularity is a video and music edit he recently made with a dialogue from the soap opera, 'Saath Nibhana Saathiya'. This scene was a quintessential television 'saas-bahu' themed and featured 'Kokilaben' who was scolding her daughter in laws Gopi Bahu and Rashi.

=== Other popular works ===
Mukhate made a song out of Shehnaaz Gill's dialogue "Sadda kutta tommy" from Bigg Boss on 8 December 2020 that became an instant Internet meme. That song has garnered over 70 million views now. Indian actress Deepika Padukone danced on Mukhate's version of "Sadda kutta tommy" on her husband's birthday, which further helped it garner more traction. He also created a song Pawri Ho Rahi Hai from a viral video of a Pakistani girl, Dananeer Mobeen, in which she said 'party' in an accented manner. The video was released on 12 February 2021. The meme trended in Pakistan and India.

=== Film debut ===
In 2024, Mukhate debut in the Marathi film industry as a music director with the title song "Love Chumbak" for Jio Studios' film Ek Don Teen Chaar, directed by Varun Narvekar.
