= Vishal Singh (actor, born 1985) =

Indian television actor

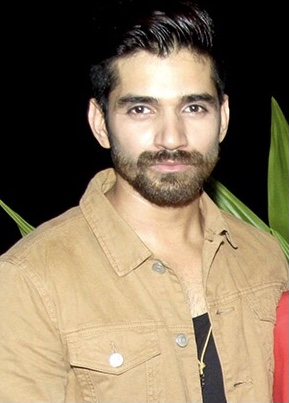
- Singh in 2016
- Born: 7 September 1985 (age 40); Bathinda, Punjab, India
- Occupation: Actor
- Years active: 2006–present
- Known for: Saath Nibhana Saathiya; Kuchh Is Tara

Vishal Singh (born 7 September 1985) is an Indian model and actor who works in Hindi television. He is best known for his roles of Ayaan Nanda in Kuchh Is Tara and Jigar Chirag Modi in Saath Nibhaana Saathiya.

== Early life and career ==
Singh was born in the city of Bathinda in Punjab on 7 September 1985. He also plays Polo and was awarded Maharaj Sawai Man Singh Award in 2001. Singh got his first break through Ekta Kapoor's production company.

== Filmography ==
=== Films ===
Year	Title	Role	Notes
2007	Om Shanti Om	Unnamed	
2016	Traffic	Rehan Ali	

=== Television ===
Year	Title	Role	Notes
2007–2008	Kuchh Is Tara	Aayan Nanda	
2008–2009	Kasamh Se	Rishi Tyagi	
2008	Kabhi Kabhii Pyaar Kabhi Kabhii Yaar	Contestant	5th place
2008	Kis Desh Mein Hai Meraa Dil	Varun	
2009	Koi Aane Ko Hai	Bhavesh	Part- Gulmohar
2010–2016	Saath Nibhaana Saathiya	Jigar Modi	
2013	Nach Baliye 6	Jigar Modi	Guest appearance
2014–2015	Box Cricket League 1	Contestant	
2015	Killerr Karaoke Atka Toh Latkah	Contestant	
2015	Comedy Nights with Kapil	Mango Crorepati	
2015	Jhalak Dikhhla Jaa 8	Himself	Guest appearance
2016	Box Cricket League 2	Contestant	
2018	Kumkum Bhagya	Rahul	
2021	Bigg Boss 15	Himself	Guest appearance
