= Our Story =

Our Story may refer to:

- Our Story (book), autobiography about the Kray twins
- Our Story (film), 1984 film directed by Bertrand Blier
- OurStory Scotland, a community history and oral history project
- "Our Story", an episode of the television series Teletubbies
- Westlife - Our Story, an autobiography about the Irish band Westlife
- "Our Story" (song), a 2015 song by Virginia to Vegas
- Our Story: A Memoir of Love and Life in China, 2018 autobiographical comic book

== See also ==
- Our History (disambiguation)
- The Story of Us (disambiguation)
- 我们的故事 (disambiguation)
- Teri Meri Kahaani (disambiguation)
- Kahani Hamari... Dil Dosti Deewanepan Ki (lit. 'Our Story... Of Heart, Friendship and Love'), a 2016 Indian Hindi-language TV series
