= Record Madagascar =

Television channel

- Type: Private
- Industry: television
- Headquarters: Antananarivo, Madagascar
- Owner: Radio Télévision Record

Record Madagascar is a foreign affiliate of the Record network, of Brazilian origin. The station is owned by local licensee Radio Télévision Record. As of 2017, its director of advertising was Pastor Zéfania.

== History ==
It is unknown when did Record Madagascar start broadcasting. It was the fifth television station to be established in Antananarivo (after TVM, MATV, RTA and TV Plus Madagascar). A Record team was expelled from the island in 2004, due to tensions with the Christian Council of Churches of Madagascar (FFKM). The station has been providing news bulletins since before 2007.

== Programming ==
The channel produces a nightly newscast (Le Journal de la Record) and a debate program (Aleo Resahana), both presented by Manohiarivony Rivo and in the Malagasy language. UCKG programming is limited to the morning Réveil de la foi and an evening program, Paroles de vie. Instead of airing UCKG programming overnight, the channel simply relays France 24. In April 2024, the channel was airing Tu Aashiqui from India and Asintado from the Philippines.

UCKG programming on the channel as of 2006 included testimonials of former Catholics who have converted to the sect and have been freed from evil.
