= Ritvik Arora =

Indian television actor (born 1997)

- Born: 22 October 1997 (age 28); New Delhi, India
- Occupations: Actor; Model
- Years active: 2017–2020
- Known for: Tu Aashiqui; Yeh Rishtey Hain Pyaar Ke

Ritvik Arora (born 22 October 1997) is an Indian television actor. He made his acting debut when he portrayed Ahaan Dhanrajgir in Tu Aashiqui and is best known for Yeh Rishtey Hain Pyaar Ke as Kunal Rajvansh.

== Early life ==
Ritvik was born in Delhi on 22 October 1997. Arora attended St. Columba's School and later went to Sri Guru Gobind Singh College of Commerce at the University of Delhi, for his undergraduate studies. In 2015, he was one of the winners of the Delhi Times Fresh Face of the Year. He was in college when he was selected for his television debut in 2017 and moved to Mumbai to pursue his career in acting.

== Career ==
Arora made his television debut when he portrayed the lead role of Ahaan Dhanrajgir in Colors TV's romantic drama Tu Aashiqui (2017–18).

His second show was Star Plus's soap Yeh Rishtey Hain Pyaar Ke where he was cast as Kunal Rajvansh from March 2019 to July 2020.

== Filmography ==
=== Television ===
Year	Title	Role	Ref.
2017–2018	Tu Aashiqui	Ahaan Manav Dhanrajgir	
2019–2020	Yeh Rishtey Hain Pyaar Ke	Kunal Raajvansh	

== Awards ==
Year	Award	Category	Work	Result	Ref.
2018	Gold Awards	Debut in a Lead Role (Male)	Tu Aashiqui	Won	
2019	Gold Awards	Best Actor in a Supporting Role	Yeh Rishtey Hain Pyaar Ke	Won	

== See also ==
- List of Indian television actors
