= Jannat Zubair Rahmani =

Indian actress (born 2001)

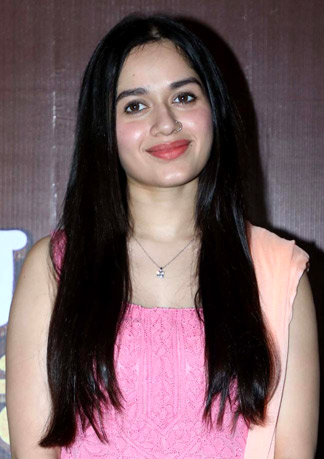
- Rahmani in 2024
- Born: 29 August 2001 (age 25); Mumbai, Maharashtra, India
- Occupation: Actress
- Years active: 2008–present
- Notable work: Phulwa; Tu Aashiqui; Khatron Ke Khiladi 12; Bharat Ka Veer Putra – Maharana Pratap

Jannat Zubair Rahmani (born 29 August 2001) is an Indian actress who predominantly acts in Hindi-language television shows and films. She is best known for portraying Kashi in Kashi – Ab Na Rahe Tera Kagaz Kora, Phulwa in Phulwa, Phool Kunwar in Bharat Ka Veer Putra – Maharana Pratap and Pankti in Tu Aashiqui. In 2022, Rahmani participated on Colors TV's stunt-based show Fear Factor: Khatron Ke Khiladi 12, where she finished at 4th place and in 2025 participated in Amazon Prime's reality series The Traitors India.

== Early life and education ==
Rahmani was born to Zubair Ahmad Rahmani and Nazneen Zubair Rahmani on 29 August 2001 in Mumbai.

In 2019, Zubair scored 81% in her class XII HSC boards. She pursued graduation from a private college in Kandivali, Mumbai.

== Career ==
She started her acting career in 2008 with Chand Ke Paar Chalo on NDTV Imagine. She further went on to work in Star One's medical romance Dill Mill Gayye where she played the cameo role of a young patient Tamanna, but gained recognition as child artist through Imagine TV's Kashi – Ab Na Rahe Tera Kagaz Kora and Colors TV's Phulwa in 2010 and 2011 respectively. She then played the role of Young Phool Kanwar in Bharat Ka Veer Putra–Maharana Pratap.

In 2017, Rahmani starred in Colors TV's romantic Tu Aashiqui played main role of Pankti Sharma Dhanrajgir. In 2018, she appeared in the Bollywood film Hichki, portraying a student.

In 2022, she competed in Colors TV's stunt-based reality show Fear Factor: Khatron Ke Khiladi 12, finishing in 4th place. She made her Punjabi film debut with Kulche Chole starring alongside Dilraj Grewal,The film was released on 11 November 2022. In June 2025, she entered as contestant in the Prime Video's The Traitors India. She was eliminated on Day 9 and placed 8th.

== Media ==
In January 2020, Jannat was brought in as the brand ambassador of UBON, an electronics brand in India.

In 2022, Rahmani featured in Forbes 30 Under 30 list in the "Media, Marketing and Advertising" category.

== Filmography ==
=== Films ===
Year	Title	Role	Language	Notes	Ref.
2011	Aagaah: The Warning	Muskaan	Hindi	Cameo	
2011	Luv Ka The End	Minty	Hindi	Cameo	
2017	What Will People Say	Salima	Urdu/Norwegian	Cameo	
2018	Hichki	Natasha	Hindi	Cameo	
2022	Kulche Chole	Harleen	Punjabi		

=== Television ===
Year	Title	Role	Notes	Ref.
2008–2009	Chand Ke Paar Chalo	Unknown		
2010	Kashi – Ab Na Rahe Tera Kagaz Kora	Young Kashi		
2010	Dill Mill Gayye	Tamanna		
2010–2011	Matti Ki Banno	Young Avanti		
2011	Phulwa	Young Phulwa		
2011–2012	Haar Jeet	Ishita		
2012	Fear Files: Darr Ki Sacchi Tasvirein	Shashi/Archana	Season 1; Episode 7/67	
2013	Ek Thhi Naayka	Pari	Episode 7	
2013	Best of Luck Nikki	Kriti	Season 3; Episode 11	
2014	Bharat Ka Veer Putra–Maharana Pratap	Young Phool Rathore		
2014	Siyaasat	Noor Jahan/Mehrunissa		
2015	Savdhaan India	Reet	Episode 9	
2015	Code Red	Simran/Surili	Episode 178	
2015	Maha Kumbh: Ek Rahasaya, Ek Kahani	Young Maya		
2015	Gumrah: End of Innocence	Rakhi	Season 5; Episode 2	
2015	Tujhse Naraz Nahi Zindagi	Ruksar		
2015	Stories by Rabindranath Tagore	Bindu	Episode 19	
2016	Meri Awaaz Hi Pehchaan Hai	Young Kalyani		
2017	Karmaphal Daata Shani	Neelima/Shanipriya		
2017–2018	Tu Aashiqui	Pankti Sharma Dhanrajgir		
2017	Entertainment Ki Raat	Herself	Season 1; Episode 14	
2019	Aap Ke Aa Jane Se	Pankti Singh		
2019	Khatra Khatra Khatra	Herself	Episode 48/129	
2022	Fear Factor: Khatron Ke Khiladi 12	Contestant	4th place	
2024	Laughter Chefs – Unlimited Entertainment	Herself	Main : (Season 1); Guest : (Season 2)	
2025–2026	Laughter Chefs – Unlimited Entertainment	Herself	Winner (Season 3)	
2025	The Traitors India	Contestant	8th place	
2026	Glory	Gudiya		
2026	Sabse Bada Dramebaaz	Judge		
2026–present	Indian Game Show	Contestant		

=== Music videos ===
Year	Title	Singer(s)	Ref.
2018	Kaise Main	Mohd. Kalam	
2019	Chaal Gazab Hai	Pawni Pandey and Prince Yadav	
2019	Bhaiyya G	Yawar	
2019	Zindagi Di Paudi	Millind Gaba	
2019	Tere Bina	Bismil	
2019	Zaroori Hai Kya Ishq Mein	Papon	
2019	Tere Bin Kive	Ramji Gulati	
2019	Downtown Wal Gedyian	Mr. Dee	
2019	Jatti	Guri	
2019	Naino Tale	Asees Kaur and Shivang Mathur	
2019	Hello Hi	Rohanpreet Singh	
2019	Fruity Lagdi Hai	Ramji Gulati	
2019	Fake Style	Raman Kapoor, Nix	
2020	Aeroplane	Vibhor Parashar	
2020	Tera Naam	Raman Kapoor	
2020	Ringtone	Preetinder	
2020	Kuch Tum Kaho	Jyotica Tangri	
2020	Yeh Mann	Aakanksha Sharma	
2020	Hey Girl	Miss Pooja and Vibhas	
2020	Meri Hai Maa	Tarsh	
2020	Taweez (Unplugged)	Vibhas	
2020	Marda Saara India	Ramji Gulati	
2021	Carrom Ki Rani	Ramji Gulati	
2021	Lehja	Abhi Dutt	
2021	Kinni Kinni Vaari	Raashi Sood	
2021	Tu Mera Misra Hai	Bhanu Pandit and Anita Bhatt	
2021	Wallah Wallah	Ishaan Khan	
2022	Chand Naraz Hai	Abhi Dutt	
2026	Rito Riba: Tere Dil Mein	Rajat Nagpal	

== Discography ==
Year	Title	Co-singer	Ref.
2019	Ishq Farzi	—N/a	
2019	Tokers House Theme	Danish Alfaaz	
2021	Hum Hindustani	Various	
2023	Babu Shona Mona	—N/a	
2023	Kayfa Haluka	—N/a	
2023	Watan Yaad Rahega	—N/a	

== Awards and nominations ==
Year	Award	Category	Work	Result	Ref.
2011	Gold Awards	Best Child Artiste (Female)	Phulwa	Won	
2012	Indian Telly Awards	Best Child Artiste (Female)	Phulwa	Nominated	
2018	Gold Awards	Debut in a Lead Role (Female)	Tu Aashiqui	Won	
2020	Gold Glam and Style Awards	Most Sought After Influencer (Female)	—N/a	Won	
2023	Bollywood Hungama Style Icons	Most Stylish Digital Entertainer (Female)	—N/a	Nominated	
2024	Bollywood Hungama Style Icons	Most Stylish Digital Star of the Year	—N/a	Nominated	
