= Dilbagh =

Dilbagh is a given name. Notable people with the name include:

- Dilbagh Singh, Indian air marshal
- Dilbagh Singh Athwal, Indian geneticist, plant breeder and agriculturist
- Dilbagh Singh (singer), Punjabi language singer-songwriter and film actor
- Dilbagh Singh Kler, Malaysian middle-distance runner
- Dilbag Singh, Indian boxer
