= The Story of Us =

The Story of Us may refer to:

- The Story of Us (1999 film), an American romantic comedy-drama film
- The Story of Us (2025 film), a Spanish drama film
- "The Story of Us" (song), a 2010 song by Taylor Swift
- "The Story of Us" (Milet song), a 2026 song by Milet
- The Story of Us (TV series), 2016 Filipino television series
- America: The Story of Us, 2010 U.S. documentary-drama television miniseries
- Australia: The Story of Us, 2015 Australian documentary-drama television miniseries
- Canada: The Story of Us, 2017 Canadian documentary-drama television miniseries
- The Story of Us with Morgan Freeman, a 2017 documentary television series
- "The Story of Us", an album by Quinn XCII
- "The Story of Us", a song by Charlotte Church from Back to Scratch, 2010
- "Story of Us", a song by Tinashe from Songs for You, 2019

== See also ==
- Our Story (disambiguation)
- 我们的故事 (disambiguation)
- Do Dilon Ki Dastaan (disambiguation)
- Teri Meri Kahaani (disambiguation)
- Kahani Hamari... Dil Dosti Deewanepan Ki (lit. 'The Story of Us... Of Heart, Friendship and Love'), a 2016 Indian Hindi-language TV series
- Kahani Hum Sab Ki (lit. 'The Story of Us All'), a 1973 Indian Hindi-language film
- Kahani Terrii Merrii (lit. 'The Story of You and Me'), a 2003 Indian Hindi-language TV series
