= Teri Meri Kahaani =

Teri Meri Kahaani or Teri Meri Kahani (lit. 'Our Story') may refer to:

- Teri Meri Kahaani (film), a 2012 Indian romantic romantic comedy Hindi-language film directed by Kunal Kohli, starring Shahid Kapoor and Priyanka Chopra
- Teri Meri Kahani (film), a 2021 Pakistani film
- Teri Meri Kahani (TV series), a Pakistani television series which was aired in 2018
- "Teri Meri Kahaani", a song from the 2015 Indian Hindi-language action film Gabbar Is Back
- "Teri Meri Kahani (song)", a song from the 2019 Indian Hindi-language romance film Happy Hardy and Heer

== See also ==
- "Teri Meri", a song by Himesh Reshammiya, Shreya Ghoshal and Rahat Fateh Ali Khan from the 2011 Indian Hindi film Bodyguard
- Kahani Terrii Merrii (lit. 'The Story of You and Me'), a 2003 Indian Hindi-language TV series
- Kahani Hamari... Dil Dosti Deewanepan Ki (lit. 'The Story of Us... Of Heart, Friendship and Love'), a 2016 Indian Hindi-language TV series
- Kahani Hum Sab Ki (lit. 'The Story of Us All'), a 1973 Indian Hindi-language drama film
- Our Story (disambiguation)
- The Story of Us (disambiguation)
