= Ardhangini (2018 TV series) =

- Title Poster
- Genre: Soap opera
- Created by: Acropoliis Entertainment Pvt. Ltd.
- Screenplay by: Rishita Bhattacharya; Dialogues; Antara Banerjee
- Story by: Star Jalsha Creative Team
- Directed by: Soumik Bose
- Starring: Nabanita Das; Jeetu Kamal; Rahul Banerjee; Payel De
- Opening theme: "Ardhangini"
- Country of origin: India
- Original language: Bengali
- No. of episodes: 307

Production
- Producers: Snigdha Basu; Sani Ghose Ray
- Production location: Kolkata
- Camera setup: Multi-camera
- Running time: 22 minutes
- Production company: Acropoliis Entertainment Pvt. Ltd.

Original release
- Network: Star Jalsha
- Release: 8 January – 18 November 2018

Related
- Tu Sooraj Main Saanjh, Piyaji

Ardhangini is an Indian Bengali-language television drama series that was broadcast on Star Jalsha and Star Jalsha HD and streamed on Disney+ Hotstar. The series debuted on 8 January 2018 and endedon 18 November 2018. This show comes from the house of Acropoliis Productions. The series is the official remake of Hindi drama Tu Sooraj Main Saanjh, Piyaji.

Ardhangini tells the story about overcoming and embracing each other's differences in ideologies and embarking on a journey of love after marriage. The series was starring Nabanita Das as Ishwari, Jeetu Kamal as Ayush, Rahul Banerjee as Umapati and Payel De as Ganga.

== Plot ==
Umpati is a man deeply rooted to traditional value system and believes that men and women are born for separate duties. He is a famous Ayurveda Practitioner and dreams of an ideal, ritualistic wife who would share his values. Ishwari, conversely, is a free spirited, independent, empowered lady who is exceptionally talented and well trained in classical dance. She believes a woman is no less than a man. These two completely different personalities meet each other on a chilly morning at the holy Ghat across the Ganges in Haridwar. When two entirely different individuals, antipodal as personalities meet, their destinies having had a significant role to play, their respective worlds eventually come crashing down.

But at this point, they've seen a long and happy spell with each other overcoming many challenges thrown on the way to rediscover herself Ishwari is bound to perform the challenging task of a housemaid a consultant a care giver and finally a lover to prove herself as a worthy wife not only to her husband umapati but also to all her in laws. Next she comes across challenges posed by the jealous Ganga Umapati's childhood friend who secretly wants to become Umapati's wife but fails to do so and then comes challenges from Umapati's Aunt Mamoni who just cannot tolerate Ishwari and makes life very difficult for her, but Ishwari uses her intelligence to single-handedly prove her innocence against every accusation and thereafter bring out the real culprits of the misdeeds for which she is falsely implicated. All these family drama finally culminate to a happy point when Ishwari finally proves that Mamoni Umapati's own sister Anjali and Mamoni's son Vishnu are involved in a robbery in their own house.

After Mamoni Vishnu and Anjali are put behind bars by the Law peace returns to the Bhattacharya family and they start planning for Nandi and Dev's marriage to the daughters of the family Arati and Payel. After this the family decide to go to Haridawar. On the way disaster strikes as their train derails and the sole survivors of the accident are Ishwari and Kakamoni. Everyone else Thammi Boroboumoni, Payel, Arati, Nandi and Umapati die in the train accident on the other side Ishwari's mother also suffers a massive heart attack in Haridwar and is assumed to be dead. After gaining consciousness Ishwari sees Umapati die due to lack of proper treatment in front of her eyes. This causes her a deep trauma and she suffers from major amnesia and mentally is transported back to be 10 years old girl. This comes as a big challenge for Dr. Ayush who is treating Ishwari and is also her secret childhood admirer.

Later the story explored the life of a mentally unstable Ishwari after the sad demise of Umapati, the troubled yet exhilarating path that her life has taken on. Here comes Ayush, an old friend that adores Ishwari like no other, takes her by the hand and takes on the world with her, but then Ishwari in Episode 304 regains her memory and completely forgets Ayush and then leaves Ayush. Ayush tries to commit suicide but Ishwari comes back and stops him and tells him that she is not going to leave him with the serial ending on a happy note.

== Cast ==
- Nabanita Das as Ishwari
- Jeetu Kamal as Ayush
- Rahul Banerjee as Dr. Umapati Bhattacharjee (Dead)
- Payel De as Ganga
- Dhrubojyoti Sarkar as Bishnu
- Tulika Basu as Komolika; Umapati's paternal aunt; Bishnu and Puja's mother
- Moyna Mukherjee as Iswari's mother
- Anuradha Roy as Umapati's paternal grandmother (Dead)
- Bhaskar Banerjee as Raghunath Bhattacharjee, Komolika's husband, Bishnu and Puja's father; Umapati's paternal uncle
- Mithu Chakrabarty as Umapati's mother (Dead)
- Pinky Mallick as Iswari's peternal aunt; Dev's mother
- Arindam Banerjee as Iswari's peternal uncle; Dev's father
- Suvajit Kar
- Jagriti Goswami
- Manishankar Banerjee as Ayush's father
- Saswati Guha Thakurata as Ayush's mother
- Arpita Mukherjee as Ayush's elder sister
- Koushik Bhattacharya as Ayush's elder brother-in-law (flashback)
- Indranil Mallick as Ayush's younger brother
- Unknown as Ayush's elder brother
- Ayesha Bhattacharya
- Sourav Das

== Crew ==
- Director - Soumik Bose
- Producer - Snigdha Basu, Sani Ghose Ray
- Screenplay - Rishita Bhattacharya
- Dialogue - Antara Banerjee
- Camera - Sandip
- Editing - Nilanjan
- Music Director - Indrashish

== Adaptations ==
Language	Title	Original release	Network(s)	Last aired	Notes
Hindi	Tu Sooraj Main Saanjh, Piyaji तू सूरज मैं सॉंझ, पियाजी	3 April 2017	StarPlus	1 June 2018	Original
Bengali	Ardhangini অর্ধাঙ্গিনী	8 January 2018	Star Jalsha	18 November 2018	Remake
Kannada	Sarvamangala Mangalye ಸರ್ವಮಂಗಳ ಮಾಂಗಲ್ಯೇ	30 July 2018	Star Suvarna	3 April 2020	Remake
Tamil	Siva Manasula Sakthi சிவா மனசுல சக்தி	30 January 2019	Star Vijay	14 March 2020	Remake
