= Sarvamangala Mangalye =

Indian television series

- Genre: Drama
- Starring: Chandan Kumar; Aishwarya Pisse
- Country of origin: India
- Original language: Kannada
- No. of episodes: 449

Production
- Producer: Harish Babu
- Camera setup: Multi-camera
- Running time: 22 minutes

Original release
- Network: Star Suvarna
- Release: 30 July 2018 – 3 April 2020

Related
- Tu Sooraj Main Saanjh, Piyaji

Sarvamangala Mangalye is an Indian Kannada-language drama on Star Suvarna that premiered on 30 July 2018 which stars Chandan Kumar and Aishwarya Pisse in lead roles. The show is an official remake of StarPlus TV series Tu Sooraj Main Saanjh, Piyaji. Owing to the COVID-19 pandemic the show went off the air on 3 April 2020.

== Plot ==
Shankara is a young man who falls in love and marries a strong-willed Parvathy. While Shankara has grown up in a conservative set up, Parvathy is an independent girl who speaks her mind and together, they brave the crises in their relationship.

== Cast ==
- Chandan Kumar as Maha Shankara; an ideal devotee of lord Shiva and Parvathy's husband
- Aishwarya Pisse as Parvathy alias Paaru; Maha Shankara's wife
- Swathi as Bhairavi, Maha Shankara's aunt
- Rekha Rao as Durgadevi, Parvathy's Grandmother
- Rashmitha J Shetty as Ganga; Bhairavi's daughter
- Nisha Ravikrishnan as Nitya, Mana Shankara's sister

== Production ==
The series was a comeback venture for Chandan Kumar to the small screen after a gap. The serial also marked the comeback of Aishwarya Pisse to Kannada after a gap of few years. The show was aired on 30 July 2018. The serial was shot in Mysuru for a few episodes.

== Adaptations ==
Language	Title	Original release	Network(s)	Last aired	Notes
Hindi	Tu Sooraj Main Saanjh, Piyaji तू सूरज मैं सॉंझ, पियाजी	3 April 2017	StarPlus	1 June 2018	Original
Bengali	Ardhangini অর্ধাঙ্গিনী	8 January 2018	Star Jalsha	18 November 2018	Remake
Kannada	Sarvamangala Mangalye ಸರ್ವಮಂಗಳ ಮಾಂಗಲ್ಯೇ	30 July 2018	Star Suvarna	3 April 2020	Remake
Tamil	Siva Manasula Sakthi சிவா மனசுல சக்தி	30 January 2019	Star Vijay	14 March 2020	Remake
