= Phulwa =

Indian television series

- Also known as: Phulwa Choti Dulhan
- Genre: Drama
- Written by: Sonali Jaffar; Sandiip Sikcand; Aseem Arora
- Directed by: Balkrishna Singh Rahul pandey
- Creative director: Indrahit Mukharjee
- Starring: See below
- Theme music composer: Dony Hazarika
- Country of origin: India
- Original language: Hindi
- No. of seasons: 1
- No. of episodes: 277

Production
- Producers: Vikas Sethi; Siddarth Kumar Tewary
- Cinematography: Shailesh Monare
- Camera setup: Multi-camera
- Running time: Approx. 24 minutes
- Production company: Swastik Productions

Original release
- Network: Colors TV
- Release: 10 January 2011 – 16 March 2012

Phulwa (transl. Flower) (also known as Phulwa Choti Dulhan) is an Indian television drama on the Colors TV. It is set against the backdrop of Chambal forest near Morena, Madhya Pradesh. The story is loosely based on the life of Phoolan Devi, the dacoit-turned politician.

== Plot ==
The series revolves around a little village girl named Phulwa (meaning "flower"), living in a bandit-infested part of India. She is a sweet, innocent, and loving girl, but unluckily, gets caught in the middle of a ruthless feud. She loses most of her family, as well as her childlike innocence, at an early age.

Phulwa has a much older foster brother named Bhavani, who is a bandit. Shankar, who wants to take revenge against Bhavani, abducts Phulwa. Circumstances make it appear that Shankar and Phulwa are married to each other. The village council (panchayat) decides that they have to stay together as a couple, though Shankar is nearly three times Phulwa's age. Shankar believes that Bhavani killed his elder brother and sister-in-law. Moreover, Shankar's younger sister Mahua was in love with Bhavani but he left her.

Shankar grows fond of the innocent Phulwa and tries to make amends for his earlier actions that spoiled her life. Phulwa idolises Shankar and calls him 'Masterji' out of respect. Sharbati, a distant relative, wants to marry Shankar, but does not encourage her.

The local landlord and politician, Bade Thakur aka Daroga Singh, sends a proposal for Mahua to marry his son, Chhote Thakur. Mahua runs away from the wedding because she still loves Bhavani but is killed by a spurned Chhote Thakur. Later Shankar learns that the Thakur father-son duo, not Bhavani, killed his brother and sister-in-law as well. The Thakurs with Sharbati's help capture Phulwa, her parents, and siblings. Shankar and Bhavani go to rescue them and saves Phulwa and her brother, Babu. However, Phulwa's parents and Shankar are killed. Phulwa and Babu accompany Bhavani to the hideout of his bandit group. Phulwa swears to take revenge for the deaths of 'Masterji' (Shankar) and her parents and joins the bandits.

Ten years later, Phulwa has grown up into a tough and fearless woman. She helps the poor, fights injustice, and regards the Thakurs as her greatest enemies. Chhote Thakur is married to Sharbati. One day, Phulwa comes face-to-face with the couple and is forced to kill Chhote Thakur in self-defence. Bade Thakur and Sharbati pledge revenge against Phulwa for the killing of Chhote Thakur.

A stranger named Shatrughan enters Phulwa's group and slowly gains her confidence. Phulwa feels that with the death of Chhote Thakur, she is done with her revenge. However, the head of the bandits, Gayatri, tells her not to put down arms. News spreads that a new ACP (Assistant Commissioner of Police) has taken charge of the area. After a few weeks, it is revealed that Shatrughan is the new ACP in disguise. His real name is Abhay Singh. He arrests Phulwa and her friends. A lawyer named Roshni fights on their behalf in court and argues that Phulwa is innocent and should be allowed to go home. It is then revealed that Abhay is the out-of-wedlock son of Bade Thakur and is fiercely loyal to his father, whom he considers a good man. Bade Thakur is now an aspiring politician. As a publicity stunt, he offers to get Phulwa married to Abhay. Phulwa accepts because it will mean her release from jail.

Abhay is already engaged to his colleague Aarti, but on his wedding day, Phulwa replaces Aarti and marries Abhay. It is revealed that Aarti helped Phulwa out of sympathy. Bade Thakur and Abhay are furious but helpless. Phulwa starts staying at Thakur's house as the new daughter-in-law of the family. Her aim is to expose the Thakur's misdeeds and take revenge. Abhay and Phulwa grow closer. Bade Thakur reveals that he murdered Abhay's mother and arranges for Abhay to meet with an accident. Fighting for his life, Abhay is in need of a blood transfusion and Thakur agrees to donate only if Phulwa becomes his slave. While Phulwa agrees, the doctor tells them that while Abhay will live, he won't be able to move due to damage to his spine leaving Phulwa shocked.

A new surgeon, Dr. Arjun performs a successful surgery, and Abhay is cured, but here Arjun's secret is revealed. Arjun is Shankar's younger brother who has come to avenge his brothers death. He plans to kill both Abhay and Phulwa, mistakenly thinking that Phulwa killed Shankar. Babu tells Arjun who the real culprit is. Abhay with the help of Arjun and Babu traps Thakur. In the end, Thakur is killed by Phulwa. The serial ends on a happy note with Phulwa and Abhay leading a happy life with their twin (a boy and a girl) children.

== Cast ==
- Sargun Mehta as Phulwa Singh Thakur: Mangroo and Imarti' s younger daughter; Babu and Champa's sister; Shankar's widow; Abhay's wife
  - Jannat Zubair Rahmani as young Phulwa
- Ajay Chaudhary as ACP Abhay Rai Singh Thakur; Daroga and Shunkatala's son; Phulwa's second husband
- Mohit Malik as Dr. Arjun Singh; Shankar and Mahua's younger brother
- Prashant Narayanan as Bhavani; Mahua's husband
- Angad Hasija as Shankar; Arjun and Mahua's elder brother; Phulwa's First husband
- Sai Ballal as Thakur Daroga Singh;
- Shalini Arora as Thakuraeen
- Mithil Jain as Chote Thakur Singh
- Aalesha Sayed as Sharbati Chote Thakur Singh
- Sushil Bonthiyal as Mangroo; Phulwa, Babu and Champa's father
- Nupur Alankar as Imarti; Phulwa, Babu and Champa 's mother
- Sadhana Singh as Mrs: Sharbati's mother; Shankar Arjun and Mahua's aunt
- Wasna Ahmed as Mahua; Shankar and Arjun's sister; Bhavani's wife
- Jagdeep Jaffery as Bade Baba
- Gaurav Sharma as Ramcharan; Champa's husband
- Shivani Surve as Champa; Phulwa and Babu's sister; Ramchandra's wife
- Krip Suri as Babu; Mangroo and Imarti' s son; Phulwa and Champa's brother
  - Bhavesh Balchandani as young Babu
- Payal Shukla as Chuni
  - Aarya Gore as young Chuni
- Sikandar Kharbanda as Khulbushan
- Shweta Kawatra as SSP Amrita Tiwari
- Anirudh Dave as Lakhiya (Phulwa's cousin)
- Trishikha Ashish Tripathi as Gauri; Phulwa's friends; Babu's love internet
- Manasvi Vyas as Sona Kaki
- Shikha Singh as Gayatri Devi
- Rakshanda Khan as Roshni Mukherjee
