= Siva Manasula Sakthi (TV series) =

Tamil-language family drama

- Genre: Soap opera
- Based on: Tu Sooraj Main Saanjh, Piyaji
- Directed by: Bashir
- Starring: Vikram Shri; Tanuja Gowdaa; Rithika; Issac Varkees
- Country of origin: India
- Original language: Tamil
- No. of seasons: 1
- No. of episodes: 355

Production
- Producer: Raj Velu
- Camera setup: Multi-camera
- Running time: approx. 21–22 minutes per episode
- Production company: A Tele Factory

Original release
- Network: Vijay TV; Vijay TV HD
- Release: 21 January 2019 – 14 March 2020

Related
- Tu Sooraj Main Saanjh, Piyaji

Siva Manasula Sakthi (transl. Sakthi Is in Siva's Heart) is a 2019 Indian Tamil-language drama television series]starring Vikram Shri and Tanuja Gowda. The series is the official remake of Hindi drama Tu Sooraj Main Saanjh, Piyaji. It replaced the slot of Pagal Nilavu.

== Synopsis ==
Sakthi (Thanuja Gowda) marries Siva (Vikram Shri) with the purpose of winning her ancestral property back from him. With external forces working against them, will they ever find love in their hateful relationship forms the rest of the story.

== Cast ==
=== Main ===
- Vikram Shri as Shiva
- Tanuja Gowda as Sakthi
- Veena Ponnappa as Bairavi

=== Supporting ===
- Abinavya (Abirami) as Sathya
- Fauzil Hidayah as Aasha
- Janani Pradeep as Nithya
- Sai Gayatri Bhuvanesh as Rekha
- Raghul Kanagaraj as Maruthi
- Premalatha as Shiva's mother
- Prakash Rajan as Durga's husband
- Manikandan as Kannan, Rekha's love interest
- Ganesh as Siddhu, Sathya's love interest
- Ranjini as Durga
- Sathya as Rajan, Bhairavi's husband (Antagonist)
- Latha as Rajalakshmi, Sakthi's grandmother
- K. Natraj as Ramamoorthy
- Issac Varkees as Sivanyanam Thambiyyar
- Yogesh Gopi as Doctor Aakash, Sivananyam's son
- Rithika as Archana, Sivananyam's daughter
- Thanuja Krishnappa as Deivanayaki, Sivanyanam's sister (Antagonist)
- Sangeetha as Bhavani, Sivanyanam's wife

=== Former Cast ===
- Nithyalakshmi as Sathya
- Anirudh as Aditya
- Sanjay as Young Shiva
- VJ Pappu as Sakthi's love interest
- Girish as Senathipathi (Shiva's father)

== Casting ==
Kannada television actress Thanuja Gowda was selected to play female lead role as Sakthi. Kannada actor Vikram Shri makes his Tamil serial debuts male lead as Siva. Official teaser has been released in YouTube on 9 December 2018.

== Adaptations ==
Language	Title	Original release	Network(s)	Last aired	Notes
Hindi	Tu Sooraj Main Saanjh, Piyaji तू सूरज मैं सॉंझ, पियाजी	3 April 2017	StarPlus	1 June 2018	Original
Bengali	Ardhangini অর্ধাঙ্গিনী	8 January 2018	Star Jalsha	18 November 2018	Remake
Kannada	Sarvamangala Mangalye ಸರ್ವಮಂಗಳ ಮಾಂಗಲ್ಯೇ	30 July 2018	Star Suvarna	3 April 2020	Remake
Tamil	Siva Manasula Sakthi சிவா மனசுல சக்தி	30 January 2019	Star Vijay	14 March 2020	Remake
