= Tu Aashiqui =

2017 Indian Hindi-language musical drama romance television series

- Genre: Musical; Romance
- Created by: Guroudev Bhalla
- Written by: Shagufta Rafiq; Gautam Hegde
- Directed by: Bhagwan Yadav
- Creative director: Shweta Bishnoi
- Starring: See below
- Composer: Nishant Raja
- Country of origin: India
- Original language: Hindi
- No. of seasons: 1
- No. of episodes: 288

Production
- Producers: Mahesh Bhatt; Guroudev Bhalla
- Cinematography: Shivankar Arora
- Camera setup: Multi camera
- Running time: Approx. 23 mins.
- Production company: Guroudev Bhalla Screens

Original release
- Network: Colors TV
- Release: 20 September 2017 – 12 October 2018

Tu Aashiqui (transl. You are my love) is a 2017 Indian musical drama romance television show based on two lovers' efforts to unite. Series aired on Colors TV on 20 September 2017 to 12 October 2018. It is produced by Mahesh Bhatt under Gurudev Bhalla production house. It stars Jannat Zubair Rahmani, Ritvik Arora, Rahil Azam and Gauri Pradhan

== Plot ==
Pankti Sharma is a beautiful young girl. Kind-hearted and charming, Ahaan Dhanrajgir is a musician. He meets and falls for Pankti, who also feels an attraction to him. Her mother Anita, being a failed actress and almost completely bankrupt, sells Pankti for money to Ahaan's rich, cruel and manipulative uncle, the middle-aged JD.

Ahaan wants to save Pankti and fulfill her dream of becoming successful singer. Eventually, he frees Pankti whose sister, Poorva falls in love with her boss, Monty after Anita sells her to him.

Eventually, the truth about JD is exposed to the entire family. JD's wife, Sheetal (Himanshi Choudhry), asks for a divorce but JD makes her sign over all her property to him. JD tries to kill Sheetal but she ends up in a coma. Pankti now pursues her singing career with Ahaan's support. JD posts indecent photos of Pankti but Ahaan supports her and they run away to live a new life where no one knows them. JD threatens to kill Poorva unless Anita files a complaint against Ahaan for abducting Pankti. Ahaan and Pankti are given shelter in a village but have to escape from JD again and go to the house of Uday Mathur (Rushal Parekh), Ahaan's best friend and manager. Ahaan tries to clear Pankti's name by lying about the photos being fake but Pankti appears on the talk show and clears her own name by telling the truth. Sheetal wakes up from the coma and shoots JD but unbeknownst to her, it is a fake bullet. Sheetal is arrested and JD is presumed dead.

JD returns under the persona of a man named Reyansh Diwan (Raqesh Bapat) and befriends Ahaan and Pankti organizing a concert in London where Ahaan is attacked by a hooded goon. Sheetal is released on bail and discovers Reyansh is actually JD. She tries to warn Ahaan and Pankti but JD blackmails her to stay silent and kidnaps her. Pankti and Ahaan argue and Reyansh makes matters worse by creating more misunderstandings between them. Pankti sets up a trap for Reyansh and decodes Sheetal's last message as "JD is Reyansh". Pankti and Uday defeat JD along with Sheetal's son, Vikram (Buneet Kapoor), and free Ahaan and Sheetal. JD is arrested, and the family celebrate.

Ahaan and Pankti meet a famous singer named Rangoli Rai (Krissann Barretto). In public, Rangoli pretends to be nice but behind closed doors she is obsessed with herself and her fame. Vikram becomes jealous of the attention Ahaan gets and instead of launching Ahaan as JMD's new face, he launches Rangoli. Rangoli tries to get close to Ahaan. Pankti struggles as people in the music industry remind her of her past as a mistress and try to take advantage of her. Ahaan becomes friends with Rangoli.

Rangoli comes to sing the final recording of a song but can't hit any notes right. The music director wants to replace her with Pankti angering Rangoli. Vikram does not want Pankti to sing as she is not a member of the JMD Company. Ahaan instead organises a concert for Pankti, but Rangoli has the concert cancelled. Ahaan, Pankti and Rangoli are scheduled to sing at a charity concert organized by KK. Fans praise Pankti's voice over Rangoli's and Vikram decides to sign Ahaan and Pankti for the benefit of his company. Rangoli plans to separate Ahaan and Pankti. Pankti discovers Rangoli's intentions but Ahaan doesn't believe her. Pankti gets upset, gathers evidence against Rangoli, and finally exposes her.

Ahaan and Pankti are set to be married on the same day as Monty and Poorva. Before Ahaan and Pankti can complete their vows, the police arrive and arrest Ahaan as Rangoli has accused him of rape. Ahaan is taken into custody while Rangoli tells Ahaan that she would take her complaint back if he marries her but he refuses. Ahaan's trial begins and Rangoli hires Dinesh Khandelwal (Ashwin Kaushal), a cunning lawyer. Eventually, Ahaan's mother, Aparna Dhanrajgir (Dolphin Dwivedi) becomes Ahaan's lawyer and wins the court case in Ahaan's favour.

Pankti and Ahaan overcome all their problems, and marry. The show ends with Ahaan and Pankti living happily with their family.

== Cast ==
=== Main ===
- Jannat Zubair Rahmani as Singer Pankti Dhanrajgir: Anita's daughter; Poorva's sister; Ahaan's wife (2017–2018)
- Ritvik Arora as Musician Ahaan Dhanrajgir: Manav and Aparna's son; Kaira's brother; Jayant and Shetaal's nephew; Vikram's cousin; Pankti's husband (2017–2018)

Gauri Pradhan as Anita Sharma: A former actress; Poorva and Pankti's mother (2017–2018)

=== Recurring ===
- Rahil Azam as Jayant Dhanrajgir (JD): Manav's brother; Sheetal's husband; Vikram's father; Kaira and Ahaan's uncle; Pankti's former boss (2017–2018)
- Rushal Parekh as Uday Mathur: Ahaan's friend and manager (2017–2018)
- Nidhi Shah as Poorva Sharma: Anita's daughter; Pankti's sister; Monty's wife (2017–2018)
- Kiran Raj as Monty/Murali Shetty: Owner of Rhythm Music Company; Poorva's husband (2017–2018)
- Himanshi Choudhry as Sheetal Rajput: JD's wife; Vikram's mother; Kaira and Ahaan's aunt (2017–2018)
- Dolphin Dwivedi as Advocate Aparna Singhania: Manav's wife; Kaira and Ahaan's mother; Vikram's aunt (2017–2018)
- Sachin Sharma as Manav Dhanrajgir: JD's brother; Aparna's husband; Kaira and Ahaan's father; Vikram's uncle (2017–2018)
- Vamika Kaul as Kaira Dhanrajgir: Aparna and Manav's daughter; Ahaan's sister; Vikram's cousin (2017–2018)
- Buneet Kapoor as Vikram Dhanrajgir: Sheetal and JD's son; Kaira and Ahaan's cousin; Richa's husband (2017–2018)
- Shagun Sharma as Richa Thakur: Pankti's friend; Vikram's wife (2017–2018)
- Raqesh Bapat as Reyansh Diwan, JD in Disguise(2018)
- Reem Shaikh as Shanaya Seth: Ahaan's childhood friend. (2018)
- Krissann Barretto as Singer Rangoli Rai (2018)
- Ashwin Kaushal as Advocate Dinesh Khandelwal (2018)
- Ankur Nayyar as Randhir Ahluwalia (2018)
- Sammy Jonas Heaney as Ben (2018)

=== Special appearances ===
- Arjun Bijlani as Deep Raj Singh from Ishq Mein Marjawan (2017–2018)
- Aalisha Panwar as Tara Raichand and Aarohi Kashyap from Ishq Mein Marjawan (2017–2018)
- Vineet Raina as Inspector Virat Raichand from Ishq Mein Marjawan (2018)
- Varun Kapoor as Dr. Veer Malhotra from Savitri Devi College & Hospital (2018)
- Swarda Thigale as Dr. Saanchi Veer Malhotra from Savitri Devi College & Hospital (2018)
- Vivian Dsena as Harman Singh from Shakti - Astitva Ke Ehsaas Ki (2018)
- Rubina Dilaik as Soumya Harman Singh from Shakti - Astitva Ke Ehsaas Ki (2018)
- Sara Khan as Mohini from Shakti - Astitva Ke Ehsaas Ki (2018)
- Vijayendra Kumeria as Suraj Rajvanshi from Udaan Sapnon Ki (2018)
- Meera Deosthale as Chakor Suraj Rajvanshi from Udaan Sapnon Ki (2018)
- Vikas Bhalla as Ranvijay Singh from Udaan Sapnon Ki (2018)
- Vidhi Pandya as Imli Singh from Udaan Sapnon Ki (2018)
- Rohan Gandotra as Parth Bhanushali from Dil Se Dil Tak (2018)
- Rashami Desai as Shorvori Parth Bhanushali from Dil Se Dil Tak (2018)
- Jasmin Bhasin as Teni Parth Bhanusali from Dil Se Dil Tak (2018)
- Ravi Dubey as Host– in Episodes 120–121 (2018)
- Diljit Dosanjh as Judge– in Episodes 120–121 (2018)
- Shankar Mahadevan as Judge– in Episodes 120–121 (2018)
- Monali Thakur as Judge– in Episodes 120–121 (2018)

== Soundtrack ==
Mostly composed and sung by Rahul Jain as Ahaan's voice. The tune of "Har Dafa" was reused for "Tu Aashiqui (Romantic Version)", and a snippet of the main tune in "Tu Aashiqui (Rock Version)" was used in the composition of "Tu Wafa".

=== Track listing ===
No.	Title	Lyrics	Music	Artist(s)	Length
1.	"Tu Aashiqui (Rock Version)"	Vandana Khandelwal & Rahul Jain	Soham Naik & Rahul Jain	Rahul Jain	04:44
2.	"Iss Qadar Pyaar Hai Tumse"	Rahul Jain	Soham Naik & Rahul Jain	Rahul Jain	01:45
3.	"Har Dafa"	Rahul Jain	Soham Naik & Rahul Jain	Rahul Jain	03:55
4.	"Har Dafa (Rock Version)"	Rahul Jain	Soham Naik & Rahul Jain	Rahul Jain	05:08
5.	"Tu Aashiqui (Romantic Version Male)"	Rahul Jain	Soham Naik & Rahul Jain	Rahul Jain	04:38
6.	"Tu Aashiqui (Romantic Version Female)"	Rahul Jain	Soham Naik & Rahul Jain	Afsha	04:22
7.	"Tu Aashiqui (Romantic Version Duet)"	Rahul Jain	Soham Naik & Rahul Jain	Rahul Jain & Afsha	03:32
8.	"Khushi (Male)"	Vandana Khandelwal	Soham Naik & Rahul Jain	Rahul Jain	04:21
9.	"Khushi (Female)"	Vandana Khandelwal	Soham Naik & Rahul Jain	Abhiruchi Singh	04:21
10.	"Khushi (Duet)"	Vandana Khandelwal	Soham Naik & Rahul Jain	Rahul Jain & Abhiruchi Singh	04:21
11.	"Tu Wafa (Solo)"	Kunaal Vermaa	Soham Naik & Rahul Jain	Rahul Jain	04:16
12.	"Tu Wafa (Duet)"	Kunaal Vermaa	Soham Naik & Rahul Jain	Rahul Jain & Afsha	04:16
13.	"Rubaru (Male)"	Meetu	Manas-Shikhar	Rahul	01:42
14.	"Rubaru (Female)"	Meetu	Manas-Shikhar	Rashmi	02:43
15.	"Rubaru (Duet)"	Meetu	Manas-Shikhar	Rashmi & Rahul	04:05
16.	"Ishq Bewafaa (Solo)"	–	–	Rahul Jain	02:04

== Awards and nominations ==
Year	Awards	Category	Recipient	Result
2018	Boroplus Gold Awards			
2018	Boroplus Gold Awards	Best On Screen Jodi	Jannat Zubair Rahmani & Ritvik Arora	Nominated
2018	Boroplus Gold Awards	Best Actor in a Lead Role Male (Negative)	Rahil Azam	Nominated
2018	Boroplus Gold Awards	Best Actor in a Lead Role Female (Negative)	Gauri Pradhan Tejwani	Nominated
2018	Boroplus Gold Awards	Best Debut of the Year (Female)	Jannat Zubair Rahmani	Won
2018	Boroplus Gold Awards	Best Debut of the Year (Male)	Ritvik Arora	Won
2018	Indian Television Academy Awards	Best Actor (Popular)	Ritvik Arora	Nominated
2018	Indian Television Academy Awards	Best Actress (Popular)	Jannat Zubair Rahmani	Nominated
2018	Indian Television Academy Awards	Best Show (Popular)	Tu Aashiqui	Nominated
2018	Indian Television Academy Awards	Best Actress in a Negative Role (Popular)	Gauri Pradhan Tejwani	Nominated
2018	Indian Television Academy Awards	Best Actor in a Negative Role (Popular)	Rahil Azam	Nominated
2019	Indian Telly Awards	Actor in Negative Role (Male)	Rahil Azam	Nominated
2019	Indian Telly Awards	Actor in Negative Role (Female)	Gauri Pradhan Tejwani	Nominated
