= Sameer Sharma =

Indian television actor (1976–2020)

- Born: 3 May 1976; New Delhi, India
- Died: 4 August 2020 (aged 44); Malad West, Mumbai, India
- Occupation: Television actor
- Years active: 2004–2020

Sameer Sharma (3 May 1976 – 4 August 2020) was an Indian television actor. He was best known for his portrayal of Shaurya Maheshwari in Yeh Rishtey Hain Pyaar Ke, Brij in Jyoti, Nitin in Dil Kya Chahta Hai and Krishna Agarwal in Kahaani Ghar Ghar Kii.

== Early life ==
Sameer Sharma hailed from Delhi, and moved to Bangalore after completing his education. He worked for an advertising agency, an IT company and for Radio City in Bangalore.

== Career ==
Sharma moved to Mumbai to pursue his career in acting. He made his television debut with STAR One's Dil Kya Chahta Hai, portraying Nitin, following which, he played Krishna Agarwal in Kahaani Ghar Ghar Ki.

On SAB TV, he played Captain Naveen Singh Ahluwalia in Left Right Left and Mannat (Mannu) in Four. He also portrayed a hockey coach and an aggressive lover in the Veeranwali serial on 9X.

Later, Sharma played a negative role as Brij Bhushan Shastri in NDTV Imagine's Jyoti. He also landed the lead role opposite Reena Kapoor in Sahara One's longest running show and Rajshri Productions show, Woh Rehne Waali Mehlon Ki as Rishabh Johri.

He also appeared in the television show Iss Pyaar Ko Kya Naam Doon? Ek Baar Phir.

Sharma also played a supporting role in the 2014 Bollywood film Hasee Toh Phasee. He played the role of Shaurya Maheshwari in Yeh Rishtey Hain Pyaar Ke.

Apart from acting, Sharma had been a part of several ad campaigns and modeling assignments.

== Death ==
Sharma was found dead at the age of 44 at his residence in Malad West, Mumbai on the night of 5 August 2020. The police said on 6 August, "Looking at body's condition, it's suspected that he died by hanging two days back". His body was found hanging in his kitchen by a security guard. No suicide note was found.

== Filmography ==
=== Films ===
Year	Title	Role	Notes
2014	Hasee Toh Phasee	Nitin Bhardwaj	Debut Bollywood film
2017	Ittefaq	Shekhar Sinha	

=== Television ===
Year	Title	Role	Ref.
2005-2006	Kahaani Ghar Ghar Kii	Krishna Agarwal	
2006	Kyunki Saas Bhi Kabhi Bahu Thi	Tushar Mehta	
2007	Sssshhh Phir Koi Hai	Episodic Role in "TattooMan" and "Senapati"	
2005–2007	Dil Kya Chahta Hai	Nitin Pasricha	
2007–2007	Four	Mannat	
2006–2008	Left Right Left	Capt.Naveen Singh Ahluwalia	
2008–2009	Veeranwali	Kunal/Parmeet	
2009–2010	Jyoti	Brij	
2010–2011	Woh Rehne Waali Mehlon Ki	Rishabh Johri	
2011	Geet – Hui Sabse Parayi	Dev Singh Khurana	
2012–2013	2612	Shantanu Sardesai	
2013–2015	Iss Pyaar Ko Kya Naam Doon? Ek Baar Phir	Varad Agnihotri	
2017	Bhootu	Subodh Bose	
2017	Ayushman Bhava	Kartik	
2019–2020	Yeh Rishtey Hain Pyaar Ke	Shaurya Maheshwari (Final Appearance)	

=== Web series ===
Year	Title	Role	Ref.
2016	A.I.SHA My Virtual Girlfriend	ACP Adil Sheikh	
