= Nawaz Deobandi =

Indian poet

Dr. Nawaz Deobandi
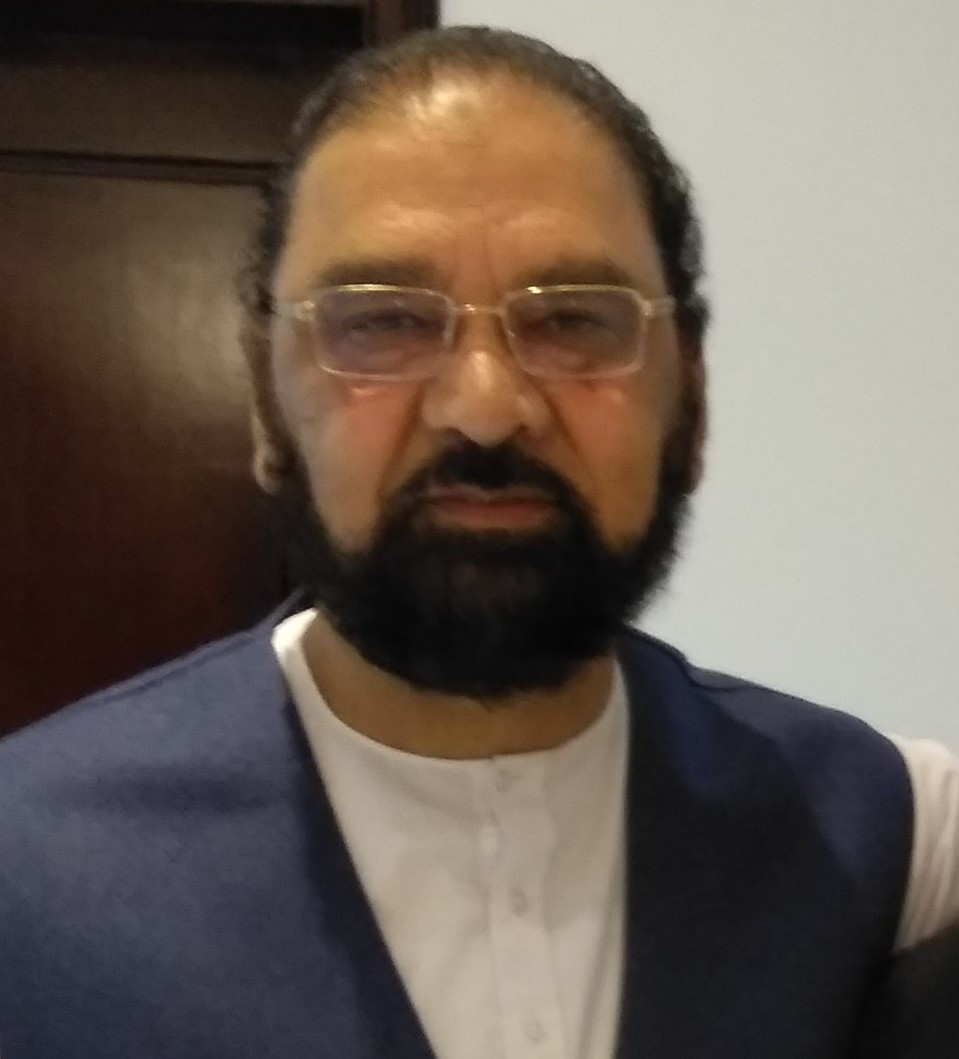
- Born: Mohammad Nawaz Khan; 16 June 1956 (age 70); Deoband Uttar Pradesh, India
- Citizenship: India
- Education: CCS University
- Occupations: Professor, writer, poet, lyricist
- Notable work: Pahla Aasman, Sawaneh Ulma-e-Deoband
- Title: Professor And Doctor
- Awards: Yash Bharati Government of Uttar Pradesh -2016

Mohammad Nawaz Khan (commonly known as Nawaz Deobandi; born 16 June 1956) is an Indian Urdu language poet. He is also a Ghazal writer some of them are sung by famous Ghazal singer Jagjit Singh. He wrote the lyrics for the Ghazal album Amaanat released by singer Sachin Sharma in 2008.

== Education ==
- Doctorate in literature D.Lit form Jamia Urdu Aligarh
- Ph.D. Urdu (CCS University, Meerut)
- M.A. Urdu (CCS University, Meerut)
- B.Com (CCS University, Meerut)
- Adeeb Kamil (Jamia Urdu Aligarh)
- Muallim Urdu (Jamia Urdu Aligarh)

== Performance ==
Nawaz Deobandi has attended more than 5000 poetic symposiums Mushairas & Kavi Samelans in various city's of India and have also traveled to USA, UK, UAE, Australia, Canada, Singapore, KSA, Kuwait, Qatar, Bahrain, Oman, Pakistan, etc.

== Books ==
- Pahla Aasman
- Sawaneh Ulma-e-Deoband

== Awards ==
- Yash Bharati Government of Uttar Pradesh -2016
