= Nazar Na Lag Jaye =

Single by Ramji Gulati ft. Team07

Single by Ramji Gulati
- Language: Hindi; Punjabi
- Released: 21 September 2019
- Genre: Indian pop; Filmi
- Length: 3:43
- Label: United White Flag
- Songwriters: Moody; Akkhar
- Producer: United White Flag Studios

Music video
- "Nazar Na Lag Jaye" on YouTube

"Nazar Na Lag Jaye" is a song by Indian singer Ramji Gulati, released as a single by United White Flag on 21 September 2019.

The song is voiced by Ramji Gulati and is released under the United White Music label. It features Team07 (Faisal Shaikh, Hasnain Khan, Adnaan Shaikh, Faiz Baloch, and Shadan Farooqui) and Ramji Gulati. The lyrics were written by MOODY and AKKHAR.
