= Our History =

Our History may refer to:

- Nasha Historiya, Belarusian popular science illustrated magazine translated to "Our History" in English
- "Our History", song from Melanie C album Version of Me
- Our History (film), 2015 film starring Óscar Carrillo
- "Our History" (Widow's Bay), 2026 TV episode

== See also ==
- Our Story (disambiguation)
- "Our Histories", episode from Scrubs season 9
- "Our Truth. Our History.", tagline of the 2026 Indian film Ramayana: Part 1
