= Tu Sooraj Main Saanjh, Piyaji =

2017 Indian soap opera

- Genre: Drama; Romance
- Created by: Sumeet Hukamchand Mittal; Shashi Mittal
- Written by: Shashi Sumeet Mittal; Sumeet Hukamchand Mittal; Amit Senchoudhary; Raghuvir Shekhawat; Vaishali Dinakaran
- Directed by: Pushkar Mahabal; Yogesh Bhati
- Creative director: Neha Kothari
- Starring: Rhea Sharma; Avinesh Rekhi
- Theme music composer: Amit Mishra
- Opening theme: Tu Sooraj Main Saanjh, Piyaji by Jubin Nautiyal and Palak Muchhal
- Country of origin: India
- Original language: Hindi
- No. of seasons: 1
- No. of episodes: 365

Production
- Editor: Jay B Ghadiali
- Camera setup: Multi-camera
- Running time: approx. 22 minutes
- Production company: Shashi Sumeet Productions

Original release
- Network: StarPlus
- Release: 3 April 2017 – 1 June 2018

Related
- Diya Aur Baati Hum

Tu Sooraj Main Saanjh, Piyaji (transl. You Are the Sun, I Am the Twilight, Beloved) is an Indian Hindi-language romantic drama television series that premiered on 3 April 2017 on Star Plus. The series is also digitally available on Disney+Hotstar. Produced under the banner of Shashi Sumeet Productions, it is the sequel to Diya Aur Baati Hum. The series starred Rhea Sharma and Avinesh Rekhi. It ended on 1 June 2018.

It was originally broadcast in the afternoon during the network's Star Dopaher (afternoon) programming block. On 24 July 2017, the series was moved to prime time replacing Saath Nibhaana Saathiya.

== Plot ==
The series takes place 20 years after the events in Diya Aur Baati Hum and it revolves around the children of Sooraj and Sandhya, mainly focusing on their daughter, Kanak.

Kanak's grandmother, Santosh initially hates her to the core, blaming her to be the reason behind her parents, Sooraj and Sandhya's death. She fixes her alliance with Mayank who lives abroad in London. Kanak's life takes a new turn when Uma Shankar Toshniwal, a rich, kind-hearted and devotional, spiritual man of fath and an Ayurveda doctor by profession, marries her, believing that as a sign from Lord. Uma is a strong faithful believer in morals and ways from his own spirit but also sometimes wrongly guided by his greedy and hypocritical maternal aunt, Nanda. Kanak sets off on a journey with Uma to teach him the greatest moral of life – humanity. In the process, Kanak falls in love with Uma after establishing herself as the perfect wife for him. Uma's sister Saras and Kanak's brother Vansh elope, enabling Nanda to instigate Uma in hating Kanak. Kanak soon divorces Uma and demands 50% of his property which is named on Nanda. When Uma and Palomi are getting married, Uma feels that Kanak is in danger so he leaves his marriage and searches Kanak. He finds Kanak in a forest where Nanda's son Aditya hangs Kanak on a tree. He saves her life and sends Aditya to jail.

Uma and Kanak confess their love and decide to get married in ten days. Kanak exposes Nanda and Aditya in front of Uma when she gives poison to Laddus. Nanda then falsely accuses Uma for killing Palomi and gets him sentenced jailed for ten years. They both escape and go to Bangkok. They change their identity and expose Nanda and Aditya.

After returning to India, they soon decide to get married but Uma, for some unknown reason, marries Meera Mittal, the deranged daughter of a rich businessman, ditching Kanak.

=== 2 years later ===
Kanak, now self-sufficient and possessing bitter hatred towards Uma, eventually reappears in his life, who has become a successful business tycoon running the 'K & U' company in the meantime. It is revealed later on that Uma still loves Kanak and was actually blackmailed and forced into marrying Meera to save his younger cousin Suman from receiving punishment for a murder she had inadvertently committed. Meera upon knowing Kanak's identity, along with Aditya, tries many heinous ways to separate the duo, including an unsuccessful attempt to marry off Kanak to Akshay also was hell-bent on ruining her. Suman is now full of guilt and decides to sacrifice her life so that Uma and Kanak can re-unite. They save her and the truth is finally unveiled before Kanak. She gets rid of her ill-feelings towards Uma and gets Meera arrested with the help of others by hatching a crafty plan.

They remarry after settling their differences and restore their relationship. Aditya realises his mistake and becomes loyal to his brother and sister-in-law. It is then that Nanda comes out of jail.

After Saras suffering an unfortunate miscarriage on account of failing to reach the medical facility on time, and seeing Uma's grief over the matter, Kanak and Aditya launch a bike ambulance service for Uma. This creates a number of enemies for Uma and Kanak from the very outset, and Dr. Parag, the corrupt Dean of Pratistha Medical College, joins hands with Nanda to cancel Uma's license so that he can use the idea to promote his own medical college and take the credit totally upon himself. Kanak decides to study paramedics and become a doctor herself to save the license from being cancelled and so that no one can label her as an amateur when she treats patients.

After facing numerous hurdles and hindrances set by the Dean himself at Dr. Parag's college, in an attempt to crush her dream, she finally succeeds in exposing Dr. Parag's true nature to the public. As a result, he is arrested and sentenced to imprisonment. It is revealed that during his time in jail, Nanda was subjected to ill-treatment by Dr. Parag, which fuels her desire for revenge upon her release. However, upon her release, she decides to abandon her plots against Uma and Kanak, choosing a different path.

Uma at this time receives a fake call and is attacked by goons, who also trash his bike ambulance. He recovers 6 months later, but loses his memory. To everyone's surprise, he turns into the same superstitious person he was before. He force Kanak to either choose him or pursue her paramedics course. Kanak ultimately chooses to continue her dream of becoming a doctor. Uma supports her decision, and Aditya then reveal that it was their plan all along to infuse some confidence and passion into Kanak, which she was lacking and also that he had never lost his memory. With this, the story finally ends on a happy note as Kanak sets off for her new career with the blessings of all the elders.

== Cast ==
=== Main ===
- Rhea Sharma as Dr. Kanak Rathi Toshniwal – Sooraj and Sandhya's daughter; Ved and Vansh's sister; Uma's wife (2017–2018)
- Avinesh Rekhi as Dr.Umashankar "Uma" Toshniwal – Kaushalya's son; Saraswati's brother; Meera's ex-husband; Kanak's husband (2017–2018)

=== Recurring ===
- Neelu Vaghela as Santosh "Bhabho" Rathi – Arun's wife; Sooraj, Vikram, Mohit and Chavvi's mother; Mishri, Pari, Golu, Ved, Vansh, Kanak and Purab's grandmother (2017–2018)
- Ashok Lokhande as Arun "Bhabasa" Rathi – Santosh's husband; Sooraj, Vikram, Mohit and Chavvi's father; Mishri, Pari, Golu, Ved, Vansh, Kanak and Purab's grandfather (2017–2018)
- Mayank Arora as IPS Ved Rathi – Sooraj and Sandhya's elder son; Vansh and Kanak's brother; Payal's husband (2017–2018)
- Kabeer Kumar as Vansh Rathi – Sooraj and Sandhya's younger son; Ved and Kanak's brother; Saraswati's husband (2017–2018)
- Shefali Singh Soni as Payal Pathak Rathi – Anshul and Himani's daughter; Aditya's ex-wife; Ved's wife (2017–2018)
- Swati Kapoor as Saraswati Toshniwal Rathi – Kaushalya's daughter; Uma's sister; Vansh's wife (2017–2018)
- Kanika Maheshwari as Meenakshi Rathi – Vikram's wife; Mishri and Golu's mother; Pawan's grandmother (2017)
- Rajeev Singh as Vikram Rathi – Arun and Santoshi's second son; Sooraj, Mohit and Chavvi's brother; Meenakshi's husband; Mishri and Golu's father; Pawan's grandfather. (2017)
- Uday Nene as Golu Rathi – Vikram and Meenakshi's son; Mishri's brother; Rani's husband. (2017)
- Sheetal Pandya as Rani Rathi – Golu's wife. (2017–2018)
- Unknown as Pawan Rathi – Mishri's illegitimate son. (2017)
- Aditya Pandey as Purab Rathi – Om and Emily's son; Pari and Sparsh's half-brother. (2018)
- Urmila Sharma as Kundani "Daisa" Shastri – Rathi family's neighbour (2017)
- Unknown as Kaushalya Devi Toshniwal – Nanda's sister; Uma and Saraswati's mother (2017–2018)
- Ayush Anand as Aditya Modani – Nanda's son; Uma and Saraswati's cousin, Payal's ex-husband; Tiara's love-interest (2017–2018)
- Sadiya Siddiqui as Nandita "Nanda" Devi Modani – Kaushalya's sister; Aditya's mother (2017–2018)
- Hearty Singh as Shivraj "Shiv" Toshniwal – Suman's brother; Uma and Saraswati's cousin (2017–2018)
- Mazel Vyas as Suman Toshniwal – Shiv's sister; Uma and Saraswati's cousin (2017–2018)
- Madhura Naik as Palomi Sopuri (2017–2018)
- Madhvendra Jha as Gagendra "Gabbasa" Singh – Uma's personal assistant (2017–2018)
- Vikas Grover as Arvind Sharma – Kanak's friend (2017)
- Hetal Yadav as Himani Pathak – Anshul's wife; Payal's mother (2017–2018)
- Rajiv Kumar as Anshul Pathak – Himani's husband; Payal's father (2017)
- Rishina Kandhari as Arpita Khanna – IPS officer-turned-politician; Akshay's sister (2017–2018)
- Ankit Bathla as Akshay Khanna – Arpita's brother (2018)
- Maqbool Khan as Sumer Singh (2018)
- Kangna Sharma as Meera Mittal – Yashvardhan's daughter; Uma's ex-wife (2018)
- Amit Singh Thakur as Yashvardhan "Yash" Mittal – Meera's father (2018)
- Abhaas Mehta as Dr. Parag Bansal – Dean of Pratistha Medical College; Divyajyoti's brother (2018)
- Sanjai Gandhi as Divyajyoti Prakash Bansal – Parag's brother (2018)
- Honey Singh as Tiara Dixit – Kanak's classmate from Pratistha Medical College; Aditya's love-interest (2018)
- Aanchal Khurana as Professor Madhavi Goenka (2018)
- Rekha Choudhary as Surbhi Jain (2018)

=== Guests ===
- Anas Rashid as Sooraj Rathi – Arun and Santhoshi's eldest son; Vikram, Mohit and Chhavi's brother; Sandhya's husband; Ved, Vansh and Kanak's father(2017) (Cameo, flashback scenes from original series Diya Aur Baati Hum)
- Deepika Singh as IPS Sandhya Kothari Rathi – Kanchan and Arvind's daughter; Ankur's sister; Sooraj's wife; Ved, Vansh and Kanak's mother (2017) (flashback scenes from original series Diya Aur Baati Hum)
- Gagan Malik as Bal Brahmachari (2017)

== Production ==
=== Development ===
This sequel of Diya Aur Baati Hum was planned before it going off air itself. Actress Neelu Vaghela playing Santosh revealed the title of the series in February 2017 as Tu Sooraj Main Saanjh, Piyaji. The title of the series was taken from the title track of Diya Aur Baati Hum.

The series began with a leap of 20 years in its storyline from Diya Aur Baati Hum focusing on Sandhya (Deepika Singh) and Sooraj's (Anas Rashid) children, mainly Kanak (Rhea Sharma) after their death.

This series was launched originally during Star Plus afternoon slot named Star Plus Dopahar Block along with three other series, aiming at retrieving the afternoon programming of the channel. Soon, in June 2017, this series among the others was moved to the prime time replacing Saath Nibhana Saathiya as the makers and the channel felt that it could reach a larger audience and also it being a sequel to one of the popular show Diya Aur Baati Hum.

Playback singer Palak Muchhal was roped to sing for the title track of the series. Singers Amit Trivedi and Shreya Ghoshal collaborated for the title track of the series.

=== Filming ===
Based on the backdrop of Rajasthan, the series was mainly filmed at sets in Mumbai. Some of the initial scenes were shot in Kerala and Jaipur, Rajasthan. In January 2018, the sequence of Kanak and Uma searching for Palomi was shot in Thailand.

=== Casting ===
Neelu Vaghela, Ashok Lokhande, Kanika Maheshwari, Urmila Sharma and Rishina Kandhari reprised their roles from Diya Aur Baati Hum. Rajeev Singh was roped for the role of Vikram Rathi which was played by Karan Goddwani and Gautam Gulati in the former series.

Avinesh Rekhi was roped for the role of Uma Shankar. Rhea Sharma was roped for the lead role of Kanak. Besides Mayank Arora, Kabeer Kumar, Uday Nene, Sheetal Pandey, Sheefali Singh Soni, Sadiya Siddiqui, Madhura Naik, Mazel Vyas and Swathi Kapoor were cast then.

In November 2017, Kanika Maheshwari playing Meenakshi quit the series as she stated nothing yet to explore in her character. In February 2018, Kangana Sharma was roped for the role of Meera Mittal, making her television debut. Soon, in March 2018, Ankit Bhatla was cast as Akshay.

=== Cancellation ===
With the time slot shift from afternoon to prime time, the ratings of the series had an increase but as it could not garner expected ratings in the slot, it was sent a notice by the channel in May 2018 and was taken off air on 1 June 2018.

== Reception ==
Week	BARC ratings (Hindi GEC urban)		Ref(s)
Week	Impressions (in millions)	Ranking	Ref(s)
Week 47, 2017	4.346	13	
Week 51, 2017	4.957	11	
Week 2, 2018	4.497	17	
Week 4, 2018	4.178	17	
Week 5, 2018	4.499	13	
Week 18, 2018	3.256	13	

== Adaptations ==
Language	Title	Original release	Network(s)	Last aired	Notes
Telugu	Agni Sakshi అగ్ని సాక్షి	4 December 2017	Star Maa	14 March 2020	Remake
Bengali	Ardhangini অর্ধাঙ্গিনী	8 January 2018	Star Jalsha	18 November 2018	Remake
Kannada	Sarvamangala Mangalye ಸರ್ವಮಂಗಳ ಮಾಂಗಲ್ಯೇ	30 July 2018	Star Suvarna	3 April 2020	Remake
Tamil	Siva Manasula Sakthi சிவா மனசுல சக்தி	30 January 2019	Star Vijay	14 March 2020	Remake
