= Dilbagh Singh (singer) =

Actor

- Born: Delhi, India
- Occupations: Singer, songwriter, actor
- Years active: 2000 –present
- Website: http://iamsinghdilbagh.in

Dilbagh Singh is a Punjabi language singer-songwriter and film actor. Singh was born in Delhi, but is currently based in Mumbai, India.

== Musical career ==
In 2014, Dilbagh Singh gave the hit song "Thodi Jinni Peeti Hai". Dilbagh Singh sang the hit song "Mari Gali" for the soundtrack of the 2015 film Tanu Weds Manu: Returns. In 2016, Singh was a celebrity judge at the Delhi College of Arts and Commerce's auditions for the Oppo Delhi Times Fresh Face 2016 competition.

Singh claims Kishore Kumar, Jagjit Singh, and Gurdas Mann as among his musical inspirations. Singh typically performs eight to ten international shows abroad in a year, and double that in India. Despite being a Punjabi singer, he has also performed in states such as Tamil Nadu, Hyderabad, Assam and West Bengal.

Singh has also acted in a Bollywood movie in the year 2018 which costars Rahul Bagga, Rajpal Yadav and Mustaq Khan. He was initially signed for just lending his voice to the songs in the movie, but the filmmakers soon realised that Singh's jovial nature suited a character in the movie and they brought him on board as an actor also.

== Filmography ==
=== Hindi film soundtracks ===
Year	Film	Song title	Note
2015	Tanu Weds Manu Returns	Mari Gali	
2018	Shaadi Teri Bajayenge Hum Band	Gugli Wogli	
2018	Shaadi Teri Bajayenge Hum Band	Yaar Di Barat	
2018	Jagga Jiunda E	Jagga Jiunda E	

== Discography ==
Year	Song name	Artist
2011	GT ROAD	Preeti Lakhi, Dilbagh Singh, Rana Shad
2011	Seeti	JSL Singh, Shafi Jalbehra, Dilbagh Singh
2011	Lalkare	Dilbagh Singh
2011	Tu Thakur	Dilbagh Singh, Ranjit Singh, Harpreet Singh, Urvashi Arora
2014	Thodi Jini Piti Hai	Millind Gaba, Dilbagh Singh
2015	End Ni	Dilbagh Singh
2017	Punjabi Awey Nachange	Dilbagh Singh
2017	Bhangrey Da Shounk	Dilbagh Singh
2017	Urban Chhori	Dilbagh Singh
2018	Waffle	Jaymeet, Dilbagh Singh
2018	Shut Up And Drink	Dilbagh Singh, Jay Vermani Oye Hoye
2018	Mujhse Judi	Dilbagh Singh
2020	Biba	Millind Gaba, Dilbagh Singh, Pallavi Gaba
2020	Mohe Na Visaro	Dilbagh Singh
2021	Maa	Dilbagh Singh
2021	London Lahore	B Praak, Dilbagh Singh
2021	Mashallah	Dilbagh Singh
2023	Mor Bani	Dilbagh Singh
2023	Dam Mast Qalandar	Millind Gaba, Dilbagh Singh
2023	Photo (A Love Tale)	Dilbagh Singh
2023	Dil Bagh Ho Gaya	Dilbagh Singh, Lakshay
2023	Don't Worry	Dilbagh Singh
2024	Bhangra Junction	Deepp Ohsan, Dilbagh Singh
