= Ramji Gulati =

Indian singer and music producer

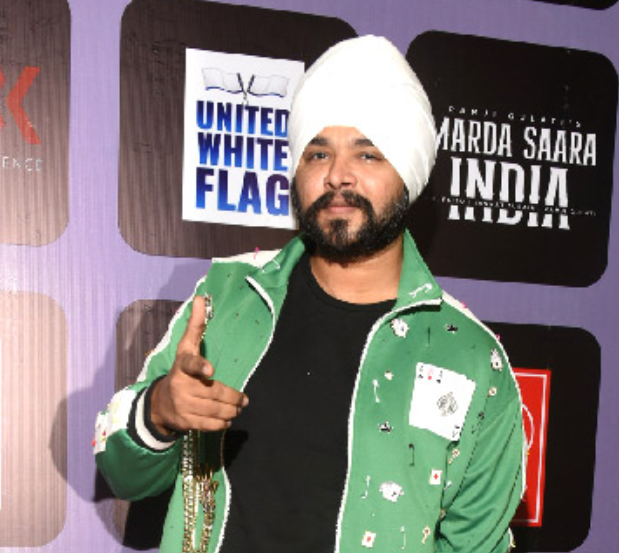

Background information
- Genres: Pop; Desi hip hop; Hip hop; Rap
- Occupations: Singer; record Producer
- Label: United White Flag

Ramji Gulati is an Indian singer and music producer. He mostly contributes to Hindi and Punjabi language songs.

== Career ==
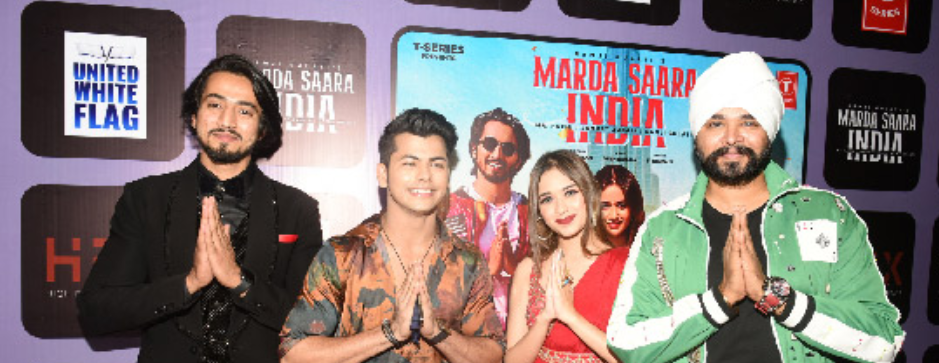
Ramji Gulati, Siddharth Nigam, Jannat Zubair and Mr. Faisu At Marda Saara India Song Launch.

In 2020, Ramji Gulati released his song "Luck Di Kasam" starring Siddharth Nigam and Avneet Kaur which as of January 2023 has more than 80 million views.

His song, "Tere Bin Kive" featured Jannat Zubair Rahmani and Mr Faisu. On 15 February 2021, Gulati released his song 'Carrom Ki Rani' starring TikTok stars Mr. Faisu and Jannat Zubair Rahmani.

== Nominations and awards ==
Gulati was nominated at the 2010 Global Indian Music Academy Awards as the Best Debutant singer, lyricist, composer. His music album UWF Vol.1 was nominated in the category, Most Popular Album.

== Discography ==
- "Tere Bin Kive"
- "Ishq Farzi"
- "Nazar Na Lag Jaye"
- "Fruity Lagdi Hai"
- "On My Way"
- "Battiyan Bujhaado"
- "Luck Di Kasam"
- "Kaali Meri Gaddi"
- "Nazar Na Lag Jaye"
- "Rona Likha Tha"
- "Marda Saara India"
- "Marda Chhod Gaya"
- "Rovaan Layi"
- "Carrom Ki Rani"
