= Do Dilon Ki Dastaan =

Do Dilon Ki Dastaan (lit. 'The Story of Two Hearts'; transl. The Story of Us) may refer to the following Indian films:

- Do Dilon Ki Dastaan (1966 film), directed by Pradeep Kumar
- Do Dilon Ki Dastaan (1985 film), directed by A. C. Tirulokchandar

== See also ==
- The Story of Us (disambiguation)
