= Rhea Sharma =

Indian actress

- Rhea Sharma in 2019
- Born: Mumbai, Maharashtra, India
- Education: St. Xavier's College, Mumbai
- Occupation: Actress
- Years active: 2014–present
- Known for: Itna Karo Na Mujhe Pyaar; Tu Sooraj Main Saanjh, Piyaji; Yeh Rishtey Hain Pyaar Ke

Rhea Sharma is an Indian actress who primarily works in Hindi television. She made her acting debut with Itna Karo Na Mujhe Pyaar, portraying Nishi Khanna. Sharma earned wider recognition with her portrayals of Dr. Kanak Rathi Toshniwal in Tu Sooraj Main Saanjh, Piyaji and Mishti Agrawal Rajvansh in Yeh Rishtey Hain Pyaar Ke.

== Early life ==
Sharma was born on 7 August into a Hindu family in Mumbai, Maharashtra, India. Sharma graduated from St. Xavier's College, Mumbai. She aspired to be a journalist, but later choose acting as her career.

== Career ==
=== Debut and early roles (2014-2016) ===
Sharma made her acting debut portraying Nishi Khanna Shah in Itna Karo Na Mujhe Pyaar. In 2014, she played Priyanka "Priya" Prabhakar Datar in Badi Doooor Se Aaye Hai. In 2015, she portrayed Chandini Kapoor opposite Darsheel Safary in Yeh Hai Aashiqui Sun Yaar Try Maar.

In 2016, she played Shubhi Deshpande in Yeh Hai Aashiqui opposite Kinshuk Vaidya. Sharma then portrayed Gauri Shukla in Kahani Hamari... Dil Dosti Deewanepan Ki opposite Karan Wahi in the same year. The show ended a month later.

In 2016, Sharma made her Bollywood film debut with Neeraj Pandey's M.S. Dhoni: The Untold Story, which co-starred Sushant Singh Rajput and Kiara Advani and featured Sharma as Ritu, the friend of Dhoni's wife.

=== Breakthrough and success (2017-present) ===
Sharma portrayed Dr. Kanak Rathi Toshniwal in Tu Sooraj Main Saanjh, Piyaji from 2017 to 2018, opposite Avinesh Rekhi. It proved a major turning point in her career. Sharma's performance received a Gold Award for Debut in a Lead Role (Female) nomination.

In 2018, she portrayed Komal Mishra in Laal Ishq opposite Ruslaan Mumtaz. The same year, she portrayed Anjali Sharma in Kumkum Bhagya opposite Vishal Singh.

Sharma received further success and praise with her portrayal of Mishti Agarwal Rajvansh opposite Shaheer Sheikh in Yeh Rishtey Hain Pyaar Ke, from 2019 to 2020. She received a Gold Award for Best Actress in a Lead Role nomination for this performance. Her chemistry with Sheikh was appreciated and they won the Gold Best Onscreen Jodi Award, at the same ceremony.

She portrayed Mishti in episodes of Yeh Rishta Kya Kehlata Hai, and had a dance performance in Nach Baliye 9 with Sheikh.

After a two-year hiatus, Sharma appeared opposite Sumedh Mudgalkar in the 2022 music video, "Tu Hi Toh Hai".

== Public image ==
Sharma was placed 30th in Eastern Eye's "Top 50 Asian Celebrities" list of 2020. Manju Chandran noted: "The Yeh Rishtey Hain Pyaar Ke star saw her fan following skyrocket in 2020, largely due to taking on challenging story tracks that shed light on important social issues." She was also placed in Eastern Eye's "Top 30 under 30 Global Asian Stars" list of 2021.

== Filmography ==
=== Films ===
Year	Title	Role	Notes	Ref.
2016	M.S. Dhoni: The Untold Story	Ritu	Cameo appearance	
2026	Flower of Life	TBA		

=== Television ===
Year	Title	Role	Notes	Ref.
2014–2015	Itna Karo Na Mujhe Pyaar	Nishi Khanna Shah		
2014	Badi Doooor Se Aaye Hai	Priyanka Prabhakar Datar		
2015	Yeh Hai Aashiqui	Chandni Kapoor	Episode: "Pyaar Mein 2nd"	
2016	Yeh Hai Aashiqui	Shubhi Deshpande	Episode: "Ex Convict"	
2016	Kahani Hamari... Dil Dosti Deewanepan Ki	Gauri Shukla		
2017–2018	Tu Sooraj Main Saanjh, Piyaji	Dr. Kanak Rathi Toshniwal		
2018	Laal Ishq	Komal Mishra	Episode: "Saree"	
2019–2020	Yeh Rishtey Hain Pyaar Ke	Mishti Agrawal Rajvansh		
2026	Mechanic Millionaire	Sammy	Mini series	

=== Music video ===
Year	Title	Singer(s)	Ref.
2022	"Tu Hi Toh Hai"	Abhi Dutt, Shambhavi Thakur	

== Awards and nominations ==
Year	Award	Category	Work	Result	Ref.
2017	Gold Awards	Debut in a Lead Role – Female	Tu Sooraj Main Saanjh, Piyaji	Nominated	
2019	Gold Awards	Best Actress in a Lead Role	Yeh Rishtey Hain Pyaar Ke	Nominated	
2019	Gold Awards	Best Onscreen Jodi (With Shaheer Sheikh)	Yeh Rishtey Hain Pyaar Ke	Won	

== See also ==
- List of Indian television actresses
- List of Hindi television actresses
