= Women de Gushi =

我们的故事 or 我們的故事, literally 'Our Story, The Story of Us', may refer to:

- Long Long Time Ago, 2016 Singaporean period film
- Our Story, 2006 Taiwanese album by Hsiao Huang-chi
- Our Story: The Beijing Queer Film Festival's 10 Years of "Guerrilla Warfare" (我們的故事：北京酷兒影展十年游擊戰), 2011 documentary film made by Yang Yang, released in the Beijing Queer Film Festival
- The Diam Diam Era (我们的故事之沉默的年代), 2020 Singaporean comedy film
- Crescendo (TV series), 2015 Singaporean musical drama also known as Our Story (我們的故事)

== See also ==
- Our Story (disambiguation)
- The Story of Us (disambiguation)
