= Yeh Rishtey Hain Pyaar Ke =

Indian television series (2019)

- Genre: Drama; Romance
- Created by: Rajan Shahi
- Developed by: Zama Habib
- Written by: Aparajita Sharma; Divy Nidhi Sharma
- Screenplay by: Nikita Dhond
- Story by: Shivani Shah; Shrinita Bhomik
- Directed by: Ashish Shrivastava
- Creative director: Garima Dimri
- Starring: Rhea Sharma; Shaheer Sheikh
- Theme music composer: Nakash Aziz; Sargam Jassu
- Opening theme: Dheere Dheere Se Meri Zindagi Mein Aana
- Country of origin: India
- Original language: Hindi
- No. of seasons: 2
- No. of episodes: 355

Production
- Producer: Rajan Shahi
- Production locations: Bhuj; Mumbai
- Cinematography: Vishal Desai
- Editor: Sameer Gandhi
- Camera setup: Multi-camera
- Running time: 19–29 minutes
- Production company: Director's Kut Productions

Original release
- Network: Star Plus
- Release: 18 March 2019 – 17 October 2020

Related
- Yeh Rishta Kya Kehlata Hai

Yeh Rishtey Hain Pyaar Ke (transl. These Relationships Are of Love), popularly known as YRHPK is an Indian Hindi-language romance drama television series that premiered on 18 March 2019 on Star Plus. It is digitally available on Disney+ Hotstar. Produced by Rajan Shahi under the banner of Director's Kut Productions, it is a spin-off of Star Plus's Yeh Rishta Kya Kehlata Hai. It starred Rhea Sharma and Shaheer Sheikh. It went off-air on 17 October 2020.

== Premise ==
Mishti, a young woman, is asked to marry the person of her family's choice. However, she feels that she must get a chance to know her life partner well before making the commitment.

== Cast ==
=== Main ===
- Rhea Sharma as Mishti Agrawal Rajvanshi: Naman and Karishma's daughter; Vishambharnath and Rajshri's foster daughter; Abir's wife; Amish's mother (2019–2020)
  - Aarna Sharma as teenage Mishti (2019)
- Shaheer Sheikh as Abir Rajvanshi: Mehul and Meenakshi's son; Kunal's half-brother; Mishti's husband; Amish's father (2019–2020)
  - Runav Shah as child Abir (2019)

=== Recurring ===
- Ritvik Arora as Kunal Rajvanshi: Mehul and Parul's son; Meenakshi's step-son; Abir's half-brother; Kuhu's husband (2019–2020)
  - Avinash Mishra replaced Arora as Kunal Rajvanshi (2020)
- Kaveri Priyam as Kuhu Maheshwari Rajvanshi: Shaurya and Sneha's daughter; Varsha's step-daughter; Ananya's half-sister; Kunal's wife (2019–2020)
  - Yamini Makwana as teenage Kuhu Maheshwari (2019)
- Sameer Dharmadhikari as Mehul Kapadia: Meenakshi and Parul's husband; Abir and Kunal's father; Amish's grandfather (2019)
- Rupal Patel as Meenakshi Rajvanshi Kapadia: Yashpal and Lajvanti's daughter; Kaushal's sister; Mehul's first wife; Abir's mother; Kunal's step-mother; Amish's grandmother (2019–2020)
- Chaitrali Gupte as Parul Kapadia: Mehul's second wife; Kunal's mother; Rajvanshi family's house help (2019–2020)
- Devaj Bhanushali as Baby Amish Rajvanshi: Abir and Mishti's son (2020)
- Sanjeev Seth as Vishambharnath "Vishambhar" Maheshwari: Bhairavi's son; Omkarnath's brother; Rajshri's husband; Shaurya and Akshara's father; Mishti's foster father; Ananya, Kuhu, Naksh and Naira's grandfather (2019–2020)
- Lata Sabharwal as Rajshri Goyel Maheshwari: Ramola's daughter; Ratan's sister; Vishambharnath's wife; Shaurya and Akshara's mother; Mishti's foster mother; Ananya, Kuhu, Naksh and Naira's grandmother (2019–2020)
- Sameer Sharma as Shaurya Maheshwari: Vishambharnath and Rajshri's son; Akshara's brother; Varsha's husband; Ananya and Kuhu's father (2019–2020)
- Pooja Joshi Arora as Varsha Agrawal Maheshwari: Sulekha's daughter; Shaurya's wife; Ananya's mother; Kuhu's step-mother (2019–2020)
- Akshaya Naik as Ananya Maheshwari Sharma: Shaurya and Varsha's daughter; Kuhu's half-sister; Ranveer's wife (2019)
- Soniya Kaur as Jasmeet Kaur Sethi Maheshwari: Sukhwinder and Pammi's daughter; Anshuman's wife; Nishant's mother (2019–2020)
- Vatsal Sheth as Nishant "Nannu" Maheshwari: Anshuman and Jasmeet's son; Ananya and Kuhu's cousin; Mishti's ex-fiancée (2019)
- Deepak Gheewala as Yashpal Rajvanshi: Lajvanti's husband; Meenakshi and Kaushal's father; Abir's grandfather; Amish's great-grandfather (2019–2020)
- Sanjeev Jotangia as Kaushal Rajvanshi: Yahspal and Rajvanti's son; Meenakshi's brother; Nidhi's husband; Atul and Ketki's father (2019–2020)
- Sangeeta Kapure as Nidhi Rajvanshi: Kaushal's wife; Atul and Ketki's mother (2019–2020)
- Shashwat Tripathi as Atul Rajvanshi: Kaushal and Nidhi's son; Ketki's brother; Abir and Kunal's cousin (2019)
- Trishaa Chatterjee as Ketki "Ketu" Rajvanshi: Kaushal and Nidhi's daughter; Atul's sister; Abir and Kunal's cousin (2019–2020)
- Kshitee Jog as Devyani Singhania: Suresh's ex-wife; Rajshekhar's second wife; Naman and Muskaan Awasthi's mother; Naitik and Rashmi's step mother; Mishti's grandmother; Naksh, Gayatri Deora and Naira's step grandmother; Amish's great-grandmother (2019–2020)
- Jay Pathak as Naman Agrawal: Suresh and Devyani's son; Muskaan Awasthi's brother; Naitik and Rashmi's step brother; Karishma's ex-husband; Mishti's estranged father (2019)
- Mohit Sharma as Jugnu: Rajvansh family's house help; Abir's friend (2019–2020)
- Amardeep Jha as Shankari: Maheshwari family's match-maker (2019)
- Palak Purswani as Shweta: Kunal's former fiancée (2019)
- Mandeep Kumar as Kalpesh Soni: Nirmala's husband; Varun and Karan's father (2020)
- Seema Pandey as Nirmala Soni: Kalpesh's wife; Varun and Karan's mother (2020)
- Ruslaan Mumtaz as Varun Soni: Kalpesh and Nirmala's son; Karan's brother; Ketki's ex-fiancée (2020)
- Zubin Sethi as Karan Soni: Kalpesh and Nirmala's son; Varun's brother (2020)

=== Special appearances ===
- Shivangi Joshi as Naira Singhania Goenka: Naitik and Akshara's daughter; Naksh's sister; Kartik's wife; Kairav and Akshara's mother; Ananya and Kuhu's cousin; Mishti's step-cousin (2019)
- Mohsin Khan as Kartik Goenka: Manish and Soumya's son; Keerti's brother; Naira's husband; Kairav and Akshara's father (2019)
- Heli Daruwala as Heli: Abir's friend (2019)
- Helly Shah as Neha: Abir's friend (2019)
- Aaditya Bajpayee as Kabir: Neha's fiancé (2019)
- Sanjana Phadke as Lalita: Parul's sister (2019)
- Ronit Roy as SP Prithvi Singh: To promote Hostages (2019)
- Aditi Sharma as Roshni: To promote Yehh Jadu Hai Jinn Ka! (2019)
- Vikram Singh Chauhan as Aman Khan: To promote Yehh Jadu Hai Jinn Ka! (2019)

== Production ==
=== Development ===
In June 2018, there were reports of Yeh Rishta Kya Kehlata Hai getting a spin-off. However, producer Rajan Shahi denied it. But, the plan for a spin-off was announced in January 2019. Talking about it producer Rajan Shahi said, "We are working on a spin-off of Yeh Rishta Kya Kehlata Hai, which completed 10 years recently. Sheikh has been signed on to play the male lead. He will be seen in a dynamic role, which will be different from his previous outings. I realised that some characters from the original show deserve to be explored further."

The team had a havan on their sets on 21 February 2019, for an auspicious beginning to their new journey.

In February 2019, Shivangi Joshi introduced Rhea Sharma as Mishti. Soon, in March 2019, a promo based on marriage and courtship featuring Rhea Sharma, Lata Sabharwal, Sanjeev Seth, Pooja Joshi Arora, Kshitee Jog and Medha Jambodhkar was released. Later, rapper and singer Badshah with some female characters of other shows of Star Plus promoted the show along with Rhea Sharma. The next promo featured Shaheer Sheikh and Rhea Sharma with the song sung by Badshah. Days before its premiere, another promo featuring both on a roof of a bus was released.

=== Casting ===
Main cast of Yeh Rishtey Hain Pyaar Ke
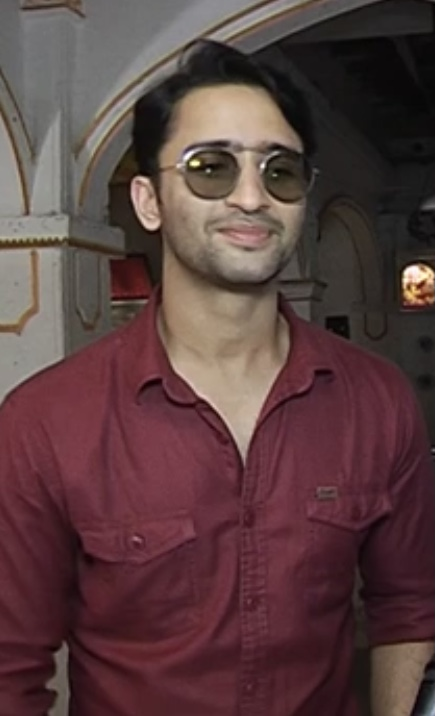
Shaheer Sheikh

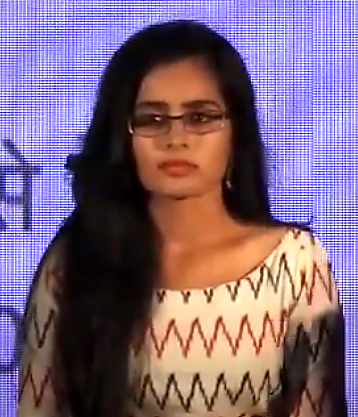
Rhea Sharma

Rhea Sharma was selected to portray Mishti and Shaheer Sheikh to portray Abir. Shaheer Sheikh expressed

“I relate to Abir’s character in so many ways and I love the fact that more than anything else, he wants to bring equality in the society. He wants all the parents to treat their kids the same way irrespective of their gender. He believes everyone has the right after a certain age to make their own decisions and follow what they believe. He is aware how in certain sections of our society the voice of women can be suppressed and he wants to support them,”

Rhea Sharma stated that she can relate her character to Deepika Padukone’s character Naina from the film Yeh Jawaani Hai Deewani. Talking about the show, Rhea Sharma said,

"After my previous show, which was also on Star Plus and it was a successful show I was looking to do something that was equally good or something better and bigger and a grand show with a good script and a different character. I was approached for the spin-off and I came to know that the character I was approached for is a spin-off and it is very different from what I have done on my previous shows. Actually, the character and the script and the association with Yeh Rishta Kya Kehlata Hai is something that made me extremely excited for the show. And of course, it is a Rajan Shahi show, and he makes great shows, and I believe in his vision. And that's it, I met sir, I was narrated the character and the show, and I was happy."

Lata Sabharwal, Sanjeev Seth, Pooja Joshi Arora, Akshaya Naik, Amardeep Jha, Kshitee Jog, Shivangi Joshi and Mohsin Khan reprise their respective roles from the parent series Yeh Rishta Kya Kehlata Hai as Rajshri, Vishambharnath, Varsha, Ananya, Shankari, Devyaani, Naira and Kartik respectively. Jay Pathak, Samir Sharma and Soniya Kaur were cast as Naman, Shaurya and Jasmeet which were earlier played by Anshul Pandey, Yash Gera and Shirin Sewani in Yeh Rishta Kya Kehlata Hai.

Besides Kaveri Priyam, Ritvik Arora, Rupal Patel, Deepak Gheewala, Sangeeta Kapure, Sanjeev Jotangia, Chaitrali Gupte, Trishaa Chatterjee and Shashwat Tripati were cast.

Rupal Patel related her role Meenakshi Rajvansh and her previous well known role Kokila Modi in Saath Nibhana Saathiya as twins stating, "I would say that Kokila and Meenakshi are like twins. While Kokila was traditional and orthodox, Meenakshi is sophisticated and educated. However, both want the best for their families and feel that they are always right. I was completely bowled over by the character of Meenakshi and the way it has been written, when Rajan Sir offered me the role. It has a lot of depth. I had to prep for the part."

Earlier, Harshad Arora was in talks for playing Abir while Tushar Khanna was supposed to play Kunal. But Shaheer Sheikh and Ritvik Arora replaced them.

Palak Purswani was cast to play Kunal's former girlfriend Shweta in July 2019. Sameer Dharmadhikari was roped to play Abir's father, Mehul in September 2019. In November 2019, Helly Shah was roped for a cameo as Neha. Vatsal Sheth entered soon after as Nishant Maheshwari and quit on 5 February 2020 with the end of his role. When the filming resumed after three months in late June after indefinite halt owing COVID-19 outbreak, Ruslaan Mumtaz and Seema Pandey were cast. In the last week of July 2020, Producer Rajan Shahi confirmed replacing Arora after discussions stalled between the actor and studio during the COVID-19 outbreak. Avinash Mishra was brought in to replace Arora. The character Shaurya played by Samir Sharma was not seen in the series post-shoot resuming with his death in August 2020.

=== Filming ===
Based on the backdrop of Gujarat, set in Rajkot, the series is mainly filmed at the sets created in Film City at Mumbai. Some of the initial sequences were shot at Bhuj, Gujarat.

The show is set in Rajkot, Gujarat. The team had shot some initial scenes in Bhuj and Kutch of Gujarat. Stating about it Rajan Shahi says, “We wanted to extend the show beyond Rajasthan and decided to add the vibrancy of Gujarat. My entire creative team explored the region, including various markets of Kutch, to capture the region flawlessly in our show. We have included various artworks, handicrafts, handlooms and the aesthetics of Kutch. Just like Kartik and Naira, I am looking at creating Abir and Mishti as the next sought after couple on Hindi television!”

=== Release ===
A promo was released, featuring the lead, Rhea Sharma and the female members of Singhania, Maheshwari and Goenka families with Badshah. The promo has a rap sung by Badshah. A peppy song was released wherein, Shaheer quizzes Rhea on how someone can marry by just knowing them over a cup of tea.

=== Broadcast ===
The production and airing of the show was halted indefinitely in late March 2020 due to the COVID-19 outbreak in India. Because of the outbreak, the filming of television series and films was halted on 19 March 2020 and expected to resume on 1 April 2020 which was not feasible and the series was last broadcast on 25 March 2020 when the remaining episodes were aired. The production and filming of the series resumed after three months on 26 June 2020. The airing of the series resumed from 13 July 2020, being switched from its earlier 10:00 pm (IST) slot to 9:00pm (IST) slot and the 10:00 pm (IST) slot was given to new show Anupamaa of the same production house(which was earlier planned at 9:00PM slot).

=== Cancellation ===
On 18 September 2020, the series' cancellation was confirmed after the ratings dropped drastically, exiting the top 20 Hindi GECs, when the series was shifted to 9:00 pm (IST) from its earlier 10:00 pm (IST) slot post-COVID-19 break. The shooting of the series was completed on 10 October 2020 and the series aired its last episode on 17 October 2020, before being replaced by Saath Nibhaana Saathiya 2.

Shaheer Sheikh thanked Rhea Sharma for being the Mishti to his Abir. He said, "Bringing a love story to life means having someone who understands and feeds off your energy. You made ‘Abir’ come to life, by being ‘Mishti’.. together we tried to create something fun, meaningful & hopeful. The world looked at Ajib Rajvansh through ur eyes."

With the show going off-air Rhea Sharma said "I will miss playing Mishti a lot, she was and will always be close to my heart."

The shows fans protested to the show going off-air. There was widespread anger. In September 2020, one of its fan attempted suicide after knowing that the show will end soon.

== Crossover ==
Yeh Rishta Kya Kehlata Hai and Yeh Rishtey Hain Pyaar Ke had an integration from 12 March 2019 to 16 March 2019. Rhea Sharma and Kaveri Priyam as grown-up versions of Mishti and Kuhu(replacing Aarna Sharma and Yamini Makwana as teenaged versions) respectively were introduced during the integration.

== Reception ==
=== Critical reception ===
Yeh Rishtey Hain Pyaar Ke generally received positive reviews from the critics.

Pinkvilla stated "The makers have managed to strike a balance between the young and the old. Shaheer Sheikh and Rhea Sharma's show lets love brew in a carefully woven drama."

== Controversies ==
=== Shaheer Sheikh's poetry issue ===
Shaheer recently got himself embroiled in a controversy wherein he was accused for claiming of writing a poetry for his show. The original writer of it called out to him after this action, and the actor released a statement apologizing for the same.

=== Ritvik Arora's controversial exit ===
Ritvik Arora quit the show in July 2020. On Ritvik being out of the show, Rajan Shah claimed Ritvik Arora has been unprofessional in his conduct. He said:

When a production member had reached out to Ritvik recently, he asked them to speak to his father, which in itself is unprofessional. The contract was signed with Ritvik and not his father, so any discussing should be with him. When his father was contacted, he asked for a raise in his remuneration, almost double of what he was being paid and also a minimum 25-day work guarantee. What’s really wrong is the way he communicated it saying, Don’t even think of calling back if you want to negotiate.

Ritvik on his part said,

"There is absolutely no reason for me to leave the show because it’s such a good opportunity. This is a case of miscommunication and misunderstanding."

== Soundtrack ==
Yeh Rishtey Hain Pyaar Ke Original Sound Track

Soundtrack album by Nakash Aziz and Sargam Jassu
- Released: 18 March 2019
- Genres: Romance; Soundtrack
- Length: 28:38
- Language: Hindi
- Label: Star India
- Producer: Rajan Shahi

Nakash Aziz and Sargam Jassu chronology
Dil Toh Happy Hai Ji (2019)	Yeh Rishtey Hain Pyaar Ke (2019)	Baavle Utaavle (2019)

Yeh Rishtey Hain Pyaar Ke's soundtrack is composed by Nakash Aziz and Sargam Jassu. The title track "Yeh Rishtey Hain Pyaar Ke", is an original track and is the theme song of the show. It received positive reviews.

The tracks "Dheere Dheere Se" and "Saathiya Mere" were the theme songs of Abir and Mishti. The tracks have received positive reviews. "Bekhudi" is the theme song of Kunal and Kuhu. Female version of Bekhudi and "Jeete Hain Chal" has been sung by Pamela Jain.

Other tracks of the album includes, "Nahi Lagta Dil Mera", wedding songs "Rishta Aya Hai" and "Shaadi Hai Ghar Mein" and the Holi Special song "Holi Hai".

Yeh Rishtey Hain Pyaar Ke: Tracklisting
No.	Title	Artist	Length
1.	"Yeh Rishtey Hain Pyaar ke" (Duet)	Nakash Aziz; Sargam Jassu	1:31
2.	"Yeh Rishtey Hain Pyaar Ke" (Sad)	Nakash Aziz; Sargam Jassu	3:22
3.	"Dheere Dheere Se" (Duet)	Nakash Aziz; Sargam Jassu	3:31
4.	"Dheere Dheere Se" (Sad)	Nakash Aziz; Sargam Jassu	2:07
5.	"Saathiya Mere" (Duet)	Nakash Aziz; Sargam Jassu	2:49
6.	"Saathiya Mere" (Sad)	Nakash Aziz; Sargam Jassu	1:46
7.	"Nahi Lagta Dil Mera" (Male)	Nakash Aziz; Sargam Jassu	2:20
8.	"Jeete Hain Chal" (Female)	Pamela Jain	2:41
9.	"Rishta Aya Hai" (Duet)	Nakash Aziz; Sargam Jassu	2:14
10.	"Shaadi Hai Ghar Mein" (Duet)	Nakash Aziz; Sargam Jassu	3:06
11.	"Holi Hai" (Duet)	Nakash Aziz; Sargam Jassu	3:47
12.	"Bekhudi" (Female)	Pamela Jain	1:24
13.	"Bekhudi" (Male)	Nakash Aziz; Sargam Jassu	1:43

== Awards and nominations ==
Year	Award	Category	Recipient	Result	Ref
2019	Gold Awards	Best Actress in a Lead Role	Rhea Sharma	Nominated	
2019	Gold Awards	Best Actor in a Lead Role	Shaheer Sheikh	Nominated	
2019	Gold Awards	Best Onscreen Jodi (Popular)	Rhea Sharma & Shaheer Sheikh	Won	
2019	Gold Awards	Best Actor in a Supporting Role	Ritvik Arora	Won	
2019	Gold Awards	Best Actress in a Negative Role	Rupal Patel	Nominated	
2019	Gold Awards	Best Actress in a Supporting Role	Rupal Patel	Nominated	
2019	Gold Awards	Best Television Show (Fiction)	Yeh Rishtey Hain Pyaar Ke	Nominated	
2020	Lions Gold Awards	Best Actress	Rhea Sharma	Nominated	
2020	Lions Gold Awards	Best Actor	Shaheer Sheikh	Won	
2020	Lions Gold Awards	Best Supporting Actor	Ritvik Arora	Won	
2020	Lions Gold Awards	Best Supporting Actress	Kaveri Priyam	Won	

== See also ==
- List of programs broadcast by Star Plus
