= Raman Kapoor =

- Born: Gurgaon
- Education: Sangeet Visharad from Gandharva Mahavidyalaya, New Delhi
- Occupations: Singer, songwriter

Raman Kapoor is an Indian singer and songwriter from Gurgaon, India. He was a contestant on the TV shows Sa Re Ga Ma Pa and Rising Star.

He is known for his songs "Neat Daru", "Do Ghunt Pilade", "Punjabi Song Saiyaan", "Mere Rashke Qamar"

== Career ==
Raman pursued his Sangeet Visharad (Diploma in music) from one of the most prestigious institutions, Gandharva Mahavidyalaya, New Delhi in Delhi. Currently, he is working on his debut Punjabi album with T-Series

=== As a singer ===
He is the lead singer of a band called OCP. Raman has also performed with renowned Bollywood singer, Mika Singh.

=== Works ===
- Neat Daru
- Do Ghunt Pilade
- Punjabi Song Saiyaan
- Mere Rashke Qamar
