= Sachin Sharma =

Canadian singer-songwriter

Sachin Sharma is a Canadian singer-songwriter of Indian descent. He has composed and sung ghazals by lyricists like Nawaz Deobandi, Amir Qazalbash, Ibrahim Ashk and Saeed Rahi. In 2005 at Roy Thompson Hall, Canada, he performed his composition Ankh Jab Band Kiya Karte Hai and was introduced by the Indian ghazal singer Jagjit Singh as a singer and music composer. In 2008, he released his debut album Samarpan, with an introduction by Jagjit Singh. In 2012, Sachin Sharma released his ghazal album Amaanat with lyrics written by Indian poet Nawaz Deobandi. In 2022, he collaborated with Saregama India Ltd. releasing his rendition of Kabhi Yun Bhi To Ho written by Indian poet Javed Akhtar.

== Discography ==
List of songs composed and sung by Sachin Sharma
Title	Single/Album	Lyricist	Year of Release
Rawana Karke	Single	Rehana Qamar	2023
Ansoo	Single	Rita Sinha	2021
Kavi Ki Kalpana	Single	Ibrahim Ashk	2014
Badan Ke Dono Kinaro Se	Single	Irfan Siddiqi	2013
Aaj Ki Raat	Single	Amir Qazalbash	2013
Ankh Jab Band Kiya Karte Hai	Single	Saeed Rahi	2013
Wahan Kaise Koi Diya Jale	Amaanat	Nawaz Deobandi	2012
Khud Apne Charagon Ko	Amaanat	Nawaz Deobandi	2012
Wo Laut Ayega	Amaanat	Nawaz Deobandi	2012
Mera Angan Mera Dar Bolta Hai	Amaanat	Nawaz Deobandi	2012
Zabaan Walon Se Ek Bezabaan	Amaanat	Nawaz Deobandi	2012
Garm Is Rishtey Ke Saye	Amaanat	Nawaz Deobandi	2012
Hey Govind Murari	Samarpan	Traditional	2008
Tujhe Dhoond Dhoond Ke	Samarpan	Traditional	2008
Shyam Man Shyam Tan	Samarpan	Traditional	2008
Hari Morey Jeevan	Samarpan	Traditional	2008
Ab Mohi Taro	Samarpan	Traditional	2008
Vrindavan Ek Sundar Jodi	Samarpan	Traditional	2008
