= Delhi Times =

Supplement Magazine

Delhi Times is a supplement magazine circulated with the Times of India in New Delhi, Delhi. The daily supplement focuses on city specific issues, in a very lucid manner, which generally appeal to urban youth. This supplement covers page 3 parties, entertainment news and includes regular features like television guide, movies, regular crosswords. A large part of the supplement is dedicated to celebrity gossip from Bollywood and Hollywood. It also serves as a lifestyle magazine for readers in Delhi. Some of its sections have also faced criticism. In December 2024, it celebrated 30 years.
