= Kahani Hamari... Dil Dosti Deewanepan Ki =

- Inter-title
- Genre: Drama; Romance
- Created by: Gul Khan; Gorky M
- Screenplay by: Snehil Dixit Mehra; Koel Choudhry
- Story by: Mahesh Pandey; Vikram Khurana
- Starring: Karan Wahi; Rhea Sharma; Reyansh Chaddha; Krissann Barretto
- Country of origin: India
- Original language: Hindi
- No. of seasons: 1
- No. of episodes: 30

Production
- Producers: Gul Khan; Gorky M
- Production locations: Mumbai, Maharashtra
- Camera setup: Multi-camera
- Running time: 20-25 minutes
- Production company: 4 Lions Films

Original release
- Network: &TV
- Release: 16 May – 24 June 2016

Kahani Hamari...Dil Dosti Deewanepan Ki is an Indian television show that aired on &TV. It is the tenth television series of 4 Lions Films. The show stars Karan Wahi, Rhea Sharma, Nikhil Chaddha and Krissann Barretto in lead roles and aired from 16 May 2016 to 24 June 2016. The show is a remake of the 2013 South Korean TV series The Heirs.

== Plot ==
The story revolves around four people - Shivin, Gauri, Ahaan, and Kia. Gauri comes from a relatively poor family and has a passion for education, while Shivin, Ahan, and Kia are rich kids from families with businesses.

Shivin and Ahaan are best friends until a series of miscommunications cause Ahaan and Shivin to have a falling out when Ahaan wrongly thinks Shivin is responsible for his mother leaving him. Gauri bumps into Ahaan a few times. She meets Shivin separately and they become friendly after Shivin saves Gauri from goons and shelters her for a while in his house. During this time, Shivin and Gauri develop a strong attraction towards each other.

Kia is a spoiled brat and is in love with Shivin and has her mother Shefali get her marriage fixed with Shivin even when he is unhappy. Gauri gets kidnapped and Shivin and Ahaan come together to find her. Kia gets kidnapped by the same people and meets Gauri for the first time and doesn't like her. Shivin and Ahaan find the girls and the four are on the run when a misadventure gets them stuck in a village. Kia is annoyed by the care Shivin and Gauri show for each other. Eventually, the group gets out of the village and returns to Mumbai.

Gauri finds out that her mother has sold the house for money and they are now to live in the servants' accommodations. She is unable to get a scholarship to the prestigious Imperial College and is forced to take up a waitress job at the college's welcome night which is being attended by Shivin, Ahaan and Kia. At the party, Ahaan uses Gauri to taunt Shivin, and Kia is constantly irritated by Gauri's presence. Eventually, Shivin and Ahaan get into a fight and Gauri inadvertently gets hurt when she tries to stop them.

Later, both Shivin and Ahaan try to apologise to her but she rejects them. Meanwhile, the local media pick up news of the fight and Gauri finds out that she is living in the servants' accommodations in Shivin's house. When Shivin finds out, Gauri tells him that her mother works as a maid at his house. Shivin and Gauri eventually fall in love.

Shivin's father, Inderjit, wants him to get engaged to Kia after Kia's mother Shefali convinces him. Refusing at first, Shivin finally agrees when Inderjit tells him that he will accept Shivin's mother Aarti, his first wife, if Shivin agrees to the engagement. Ahaan's estranged mother returns with proof that Shefali and Ahaan's father Jagmohan are plotting against Inderjit and they expose the plan to Shivin's family. Inderjit cancels the engagement and realises his second wife Prerna wanted to separate him from Shivin all along. He throws her out of the house and returns to Aarti. Ahaan reunites Shivin and Gauri as the show ends.

== Cast ==
- Karan Wahi as Shivin Raichand
- Rhea Sharma as Gauri Shukla
- Nikhil Chaddha as Ahaan Vadhera, Shivin's best friend
- Krissann Barretto as Kia Kapoor, Shivin's friend and ex-fiance
- Varun Khandelwal as Akshay Shukla, Gauri's elder brother
- Payal Nair as Aarti Raichand, Shivin's mother
- Shailesh Datar as Jagmohan Vadhera, Ahaan's father
