= Piyush Dinesh Gupta =

Indian film producer

- Born: Piyush Gupta; 2 August 1984 (age 41); Jaipur, Rajasthan, India
- Occupations: Film producer, television producer
- Years active: 2013–present
- Known for: Rajdhani Express, Lantrani, Interrogation

Piyush Dinesh Gupta (also known as Piyush Gupta) is an Indian film producer associated with Hindi cinema, television and OTTs. He began his film production career with the 2013 film Rajdhani Express as a co-producer and has since been associated with various film and television productions.

== Early life and education ==
Piyush Gupta was born on 2 August 1984 in Jaipur, Rajasthan, India. He completed his schooling from Delhi and moved to Sardar Patel University, Gujarat for graduation.

== Career ==
Gupta started his career in the entertainment industry with Jimmy Sheirgill's film Rajdhani Express where he was credited as a co-producer. Later, he worked on various film and television productions. His credits include the television series like Aisi Deewangi Dekhi Nahi Kahi, Qubool Hai and films including Maurh, Lantrani, and Interrogation.

== Filmography ==
=== Films ===
Year	Title	Role	Notes
2013	Rajdhani Express	Co-Producer	Starring Jimmy Sheirgill
2013	Main Krishna Hoon	Producer	Starring Hrithik Roshan, Katrina Kaif and Juhi Chawla
2016	Kiran Kulkarni vs Kiran Kulkarni	Co-producer	Marathi film
2023	Maurh	Producer	Starring Ammy Virk
2024	Lantrani	Producer	Starring Johnny Lever and Jitendra Kumar
2025	Interrogation	Producer	Released on Zee5
TBA	Has De Meri Jaan	Producer	Pre-production, starring Junaid Khan

=== Television ===
Year(s)	Title	Role	TV Channel
2012–2016	Qubool Hai	Producer	Aired on Zee TV
2015	Ranbheri	Producer	DD National
2016–2017	Happy Hours	Producer	& TV
2017–2018	Aisi Deewangi Dekhi Nahi Kahi	Producer	Zee TV
2017–2018	Dil Se Dil Tak	Producer	Colors TV
2017–2018	Kaal Bhairav Rahasya	Producer	Star Bharat
2019	Vidya	Producer	Colors TV
2021	Gupta Brothers	Producer	Star Bharat
2021–2022	Aggar Tum Na Hote	Producer	Zee TV
2025	Gharwali Pedwali	Producer	&TV and Zee TV

=== Webseries ===
Year(s)	Title	Role	Notes
2019	Bhram	Co-producer	ZEE5 original series starring Kalki Koechlin
2019	Bhoot Purva	Producer	ZEE5 original series
2019–2020	Poison	Producer	ZEE5 original series starring Arbaaz Khan
2020	Raktanchal	Producer	Crime drama series for MX Player
2022	Shiksha Mandal	Producer	MX Player original series
2026	Vimal Khanna	Producer	Psychological thriller series premiered on MX Player
