= Rahul Sharma (actor) =

Indian actor

- Occupation: Actor
- Years active: 2011–present
- Works: Full list
- Spouse: Neha Sharma (m. 2022)

Rahul Sharma is an Indian television actor. He is best known for his roles in the anthology series Teri Meri Love Stories and the soap operas Kaal Bhairav Rahasya, Ek Ghar Banaunga and Mitegi Laxman Rekha .

== Personal life ==
Rahul hails from Dausa in Rajasthan and moved to Mumbai to become an actor. Sharma is a science graduate who wanted to do MBA but after attending a 50-day theatre workshop at the National School of Drama in New Delhi his life changed and he decided to be an actor. He has described himself as an avid traveller.

He married Neha Sharma, a school teacher in Jaipur, on 22 January 2022.

== Career ==
In 2012, he played the male lead in an episode of Teri Meri Love Stories. He played the role of Aakash Garg in the Star Plus TV series Ek Ghar Banaunga, Raghav Roy in Sony Pal's Ek Rishta Aisa Bhi and Vishesh in &TV's Mitegi Laxman Rekha opposite Shivani Tomar in 2018.

His most popular onscreen jodi is opposite to Saachi Tiwari in Dangal TV's most popular show Kaisa Hai Yeh Rishta Anjaana as Rajat and Anmol, loved in the name of "Rajmol" by the audience.

== Filmography ==
=== Television ===
Year	Serial	Role	Notes
2011–2012	Kahani Chandrakanta Ki	Yuvraj Inderjeet Singh	
2012	Teri Meri Love Stories	Aryan	
2013–2014	Ek Ghar Banaunga	Aakash Garg	
2014–2015	Ek Rishta Aisa Bhi	Raghav Roy	
2016	Satrangi Sasural	Bharat Bhushan Chautala	
2016	Naagarjuna - Ek Yoddha	Arjun	
2016	Dr. Madhumati On Duty	Rahul	
2017	Tanhaiyan	Raza Siddiqui	
2017	Vighnaharta Ganesha	Vishnu	
2017–2018	Kaal Bhairav Rahasya	Rahul Prakash	
2018	Mitegi Laxman Rekha	Vishesh Devyani Thakur	
2019	Laal Ishq	Burjil Batiwala	
2019	Laal Ishq	Aman	
2019	Laal Ishq	Raghav	
2019–2020	Pyaar Ki Luka Chuppi	Sarthak Yadav	
2022	Yashomati Maiyaa Ke Nandlala	Nanda	
2023	Swaraj	Madan Lal Dhingra	
2023–2024	Kaisa Hai Yeh Rishta Anjana	Rajat Chauhan	
2025	Yeh Rishta Kya Kehlata Hai	Anshuman Raizada	

=== Web series ===
Year	Series	Role	Ref(s)
2019	Maaya 3	Rajeev Singh	
2021	Hello Jee	Bhushan Sharma	

=== Music videos ===
Year	Music Video
2018	Dil Awara
2019	Tum Jaan Ho Meri
2022	Dua karo

=== Short films ===
Year	Short Film
2019	Khwabida
2019	The Burned Rose
