= Avinash Sachdev =

Indian actor

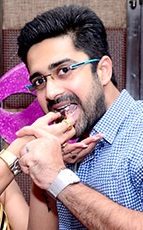
- Sachdev in 2015
- Born: 22 August 1986 (age 40); Vadodara, Gujarat
- Occupation: Actor
- Years active: 2006–present
- Known for: Choti Bahu; Iss Pyaar Ko Kya Naam Doon? Ek Baar Phir
- Spouse: Shalmalee Desai (m. 2015; div. 2017)

Avinash Sachdev (born 22 August 1986) is an Indian actor. He began his career with roles in television commercials. Following appearances in television series, Sachdev gained notable roles for his portrayal as Dev Purohit in the Zee TV drama series Chotti Bahu (2008–2012) and Shlok Agnihotri in the StarPlus romantic drama Iss Pyaar Ko Kya Naam Doon? Ek Baar Phir (2013–2015).

Sachdev's performance on Iss Pyaar Ko Kya Naam Doon? Ek Baar Phir earned him recognition internationally. He is the recipient of the Indian Telly Award — Fresh New Face (2009) during his work on Chotti Bahu. Sachdev continued starring in television series playing the wealthy and influential landowner Armaan Raza Sheikh in Qubool Hai 4 (2015–2016), Dr. Amit Goel in Balika Vadhu – Lahme Pyaar Ke (2016), the devoted and protective Madhav Singh Takhur in Main Bhi Ardhangini (2019), and an undercover law enforcement officer in Mangal Lakshmi (2026).

== Early life ==
Avinash Sachdev was born on 22 August 1986 in Mumbai, Maharashtra and brought up in Vadodara, Gujarat. His father’s name is Vijay Sachdev, and his mother’s name is Pooja Sachdev. He completed his education in Vadodara. Sachdev initially wanted to serve the Indian Administrative Service as an Air Force Pilot but was unable as he was prescribed eyeglasses. After moving back to Mumbai, Sachdev developed an interest in filmmaking production and began his acting career in 2006.

== Career ==
=== Early work ===
After winning pageant titles such as Mr. Baroda, Mr. University and Mr. Gujarat (2004-2005), Sachdev participated in the Gladrags Model Hunt. He volunteered as an assistant director on Hatim when he was 18 years old. He also volunteered and assisted Farhan Akhtar in Rock On!! (2008). He began participating in television commercials doing ads for TVS Scooty. Sachdev made his acting debut in 2006 with a cameo appearance in the StarPlus drama series Karam Apnaa Apnaa. He played his first negative role in the Sony TV drama series Khwaish from 2007 to 2008 in a minor role, followed by a double negative role in the StarPlus drama series Kis Desh Mein Hai Meraa Dil in 2008.

=== 2008–2015: Career breakthrough ===
Sachdev’s first notable role was his portrayal as Dev Purohit in the Zee TV drama series Chotti Bahu. Dev is a simple and family-oriented man who lives up to his family’s expectations and is determined to make his family proud. When he meets a girl he develops feelings for, he must navigate the challenges of pursuing his own happiness while staying true to his family’s values. In 2011, Sachdev reprised his role as Dev Purohit in the second season of Chotti Bahu with a new plot. After the end of the series, he participated in several world tours and concerts. In 2010, 2011, and 2012, he performed in the Zee Night Concerts along with his Chotti Bahu co-star, Rubina Dilaik. In 2012, Sachdev also participated in the Zee Heroes concert and in 2013, he performed at the Zee Stars Concert held in South Africa.

From 2013 to 2015, Sachdev starred in the StarPlus romantic drama series Iss Pyaar Ko Kya Naam Doon? Ek Baar Phir alongside Shrenu Parikh as Shlok Agnihotri. Shlok is a wealthy businessman who turns into a chauvinist after his troubled breakup in the past. Shlok deceivingly shows love and marries Aastha (Shrenu Parikh) to take revenge as he mistakenly holds her accountable for his lost reputation. Despite his intentions, Shlok is also deeply conflicted and struggles with his own emotions, and with the help of his wife, he learns to overcome his past and recognises the importance of equality. His character undergoes a significant development throughout the series, particularly through his relationship with Aastha, who challenges his beliefs and helps him become more compassionate. In 2017, because of Sachdev’s work on the series, he was invited to Turkey and Azerbaijan for his contribution to the series. Kanal 7 organised a meet and greet event for the Turkish and Azerbaijani fans of the show. In a 2019 interview with Sphere Origins, Sachdev was asked about the challenge of the series, and he stated that it was difficult to portray an anti-hero role with domestic violence elements while showcasing a love story at the same time.

=== 2015–2019: Continued lead roles ===
In 2015, Sachdev joined the cast and the final season of the Zee TV social drama series Qubool Hai season 4, portraying Armaan Raza Sheikh, a landowner who has a reputation for being a troublemaker. His wealth and status make him a prominent figure to the public, and he navigates his life with a sense of purpose and determination. Despite his outwardly strong and assertive personality, Armaan's emotions are revealed through his relationships and personal struggles. He is driven by a deep sense of responsibility and is often seen trying to protect and support those he cares about after his family is threatened.

Sachdev played Dr. Amit Geol in the Colors TV drama series Balikha Vadhu - Lahme Pyaar Ke in 2016. Dr. Amit Geol is a surgical doctor who takes his work with great pride. He is highly skilled, qualified, knowledgeable, and known for his attention to detail. This was his third television project with the production company, Sphere Origins. Sachdev talked about the coincidence about receiving offers in sequels and joked about being the “sequel king”. In an interview with ABP News, he expressed that playing a doctor in a television series was difficult because of the lack of time to learn about the profession. He added that, in contrast, film roles provide more time to study the characters in-depth and attend workshops to gain familiarity. Sachdev also revealed that he formed a newfound appreciation for doctors because of their routinely intense work. In 2017, he played as the software engineer, Avinash Dubey in the Star Bharat drama series Ayushman Bhava

In 2019, Sachdev starred in the &TV supernatural drama series Main Bhi Ardhangini as Madhav Singh Thakur. Madhav carries a burden of grief and guilt due to the tragic loss of his beloved wife. He is strongly devoted to his wife's memory and his determined to protect his family from harm. Throughout the series, Madhav's journey is marked by emotional waves as he battles with his past and navigates the present challenges. His character evolves over time after he finds a sense of comfort from his childhood friend. Madhav showcases layers of vulnerability, strength, and resilience as he seeks redemption and closure amidst the mysteries and supernatural elements surrounding his life. Main Bhi Ardhagini was filmed in Jaipur, Rajasthan. Speaking about his experience working on the show, Sachdev claimed that shooting in Jaipur is more relaxed than the fast-paced shooting atmosphere in Mumbai.

=== 2021 to present ===
In 2021, Sachdev made his first web series appearance in a minor role as Vivek on the Pocket Films romantic comedy series Suraj aur Saanjh. He also appeared in a short film, Make Her Happy, playing Rahul. Rahul has moved on from a past relationship and is now living with his girlfriend. His emotional stability is disrupted when his former partner unexpectedly contacts him, placing him in an awkward position as he attempts to balance his commitments while confronting his past. Sachdev dubbed in Hindi for actors Sivakarthikeyan in Doctor and Dhanush in Vaathi.

In 2022, Sachdev shot a trailer promo for a Pratilipi FM horror thriller podcast, Chakia Ki Dayan with his former co-star, Shrenu Parikh. Avinash Sachdev plays the role of a determined and clever man who becomes central to the unfolding mystery in the village of Chakia. He is characterized by his intellectual nature to uncover the truth behind the supernatural events linked to the legend of the Dayan (witch). As a brave and intelligent figure, he is driven by a sense of duty to protect the villagers from the hostile forces that seem to trouble them. His journey is marked by his relentless pursuit of answers, often putting himself in danger to confront the mysterious and unsettling occurrences head-on.

From June to August 2023, Sachdev participated as a contestant on the reality show Bigg Boss OTT 2.

In 2025, Sachdev expanded his screen presence by appearing in several microdramas across digital platforms. He featured in Story TV's Ek Tha Shehzada in a negative role as Vikram Aditya Mehra. Vikram is portrayed as an ambitious and morally compromised businessman who becomes involved in a series of high-profile schemes driven by corporate greed and power. His storyline centers on betrayal and plotting corrupt strategies aimed at dismantling the established rival business empire through strategic partnerships, ultimately positioning himself as a major threat. Sachdev played Raghav, a highly skilled and experienced casino gambler, in Story TV’s King of Hearts. Raghav’s partner is drawn into the same world in gambling, where she is deceived by her opponents and loses a significant sum of money. Driven by a desire for justice and retribution, Raghav seeks to reclaim his lost earnings. His storyline follows his navigation of high-stake betting, calculated decision-making, and the dangers of gambling as he attempts to outsmart his opponents. He also appeared in Story TV's Monster Maa and Undercover Real Boss, and featured on Kuku TV's Superstar's Bodyguard. Sachdev portrayed Vikram on Amazon MX Player's paranormal web series Bhay: The Gaurav Tiwari Mystery (2025).

After a hiatus of nearly seven years, Sachdev made his television comeback in February 2026 with the Colors TV drama series Mangal Lakshmi. The series underwent a five-year narrative leap, after which his character was introduced. Sachdev portrays Jairaj Raizada, an undercover, highly qualified Assistant Commissioner of Police (ACP) officer, who initially masks his identity as a wealthy and influential business tycoon, compelling him to relentlessly climb the ranks of the corporate ladder to advance his interests. Jairaj secretly leads a national case to track and dismantle a major corruption scheme involving an extensive network of counterfeit cash operations across India.

== Personal life ==
Sachdev married his co-actor, Shalmalee Desai in 2015. They divorced in 2017.

== Filmography ==
=== Television ===
Year	Title	Role(s)	Notes
2004	Hatim (TV series)		Episode 32; uncredited cameo
2006–2007	Karam Apnaa Apnaa	Sumit Malhotra	Cameo role
2007–2008	Khwaish	Salman	
2008	Kis Desh Mein Hai Meraa Dil	Manmeet / Prashant	
2008–2012	Chotti Bahu	Dev Raj Purohit	Lead role
2012	Teri Meri Love Stories	Ishaan	1 episode
2013–2015	Iss Pyaar Ko Kya Naam Doon? Ek Baar Phir	Shlok Agnihotri	Lead role
2014–2015	Box Cricket League 1	Contestant	Player in Kolkata Baabu Moshayes
2015–2016	Qubool Hai 4	Armaan Raza Sheikh	Lead role
2016	Box Cricket League 2	Contestant	Player in Jaipur Raj Joshiley
2016	Balika Vadhu	Dr. Amit Goel	Lead role
2017	Ayushman Bhava	Avinash Dubey	Lead Role
2019	Main Bhi Ardhangini	Madhav Singh Thakur	Lead Role
2019	Nach Baliye 9	Contestant	
2026	Mangal Lakshmi	Jairaj Raizada	

=== Web series/OTT ===
Year	Title	Role	Notes
2021	Suraj aur Saanjh	Vivek	1 episode
2021	Make Her Happy	Rahul	
2023	Bigg Boss OTT 2	Contestant	Evicted day 49 (7th place)
2025	Ek Tha Shehzada	Vikram Aditya Mehra	Microdrama
2025	King of Hearts	Raghav	Microdrama
2025	Monster Maa	Ashwin	Microdrama
2025	Undercover Real Boss	Godfather	Microdrama
2025	Superstar's Bodyguard		Microdrama
2025	Bhay: The Gaurav Tiwari Mystery	Vikram	3 Episodes

== Awards and nominations ==
Year	Award	Category	Work	Result
2009	Indian Telly Awards	Fresh New Face (Male)	Chotti Bahu	Won
2009	Indian Telly Awards	Best New Actor in Lead Role (Male)	Chotti Bahu	Nominated
