= Shrenu Parikh =

Indian actress (born 1989)

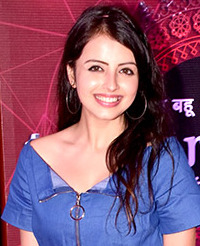
- Parikh in 2017
- Born: 11 November 1989 (age 37); Vadodara, Gujarat, India
- Occupation: Actress
- Years active: 2010–present
- Known for: Iss Pyaar Ko Kya Naam Doon? Ek Baar Phir and Ishqbaaz
- Spouse: Akshay Mhatre (m.2023)

Shrenu Parikh Mhatre (pronounced [ˈʃɾeːnu ˈpaːɾɪkʰ];née Parikh; born 11 November 1989) is an Indian actress. Parikh gained notable roles for her portrayal as Aastha Agnihotri in the StarPlus romantic drama series Iss Pyaar Ko Kya Naam Doon? Ek Baar Phir (2013–2015) and Gauri Trivedi Singh Oberoi in the drama series Ishqbaaaz (2017–2018).

Parikh made her first film debut in 2017 and appeared in her second film in 2018. She continued starring in television series playing the deceptive and vengeful Jhanvi Mittal in Ek Bhram...Sarvagun Sampanna (2019), a faithful Genda Agrawal in Ghar Ek Mandir – Kripa Agrasen Maharaj Ki (2021–2022), and Maitree (2023).

== Early life and education ==
Parikh was born on 11 November 1989 in Vadodara, Gujarat. She has a younger brother, Shubham Parikh. Parikh attended Navarachana Vidyani Vidyalaya and graduated with a Pharmacy degree from the Babaria Institute of Pharmacy, Vadodara. In 2008, she won Miss Vadodara, before beginning her career in acting.

== Career ==
=== 2010–2012: Early work ===
Parikh began her career with a cameo appearance as Roopa in the StarPlus series Zindgi Ka Har Rang...Gulaal in 2010. Parikh secured her first television lead role in the Colors TV series Havan in 2011. In 2012, she played a role in the Sony TV drama series Byaah Hamari Bahoo Ka. Speaking about her experience in this series, Parikh said, "I learned voice modulation and working on body language. I have grown as an actor".

=== 2013–2019: Career breakthrough ===
Parikh's first notable role was her portrayal as Aastha Agnihotri in the StarPlus romantic drama series Iss Pyaar Ko Kya Naam Doon? Ek Baar Phir where she starred alongside Avinash Sachdev. Aastha is an extremely resilient and progressive girl who holds gender equality beliefs but unknowingly marries a chauvinist as he keeps her in a false pretence until their marriage night. After a relentless pursuit of changing her husband's personality, she witnesses domestic violence and challenges Agnihotri's regressive traditions. She helps the women in her family battle against domestic violence by instilling courage and confidence. Aastha eventually manages to unite her family through her commitment to change. Parikh shared her experience in the show and stated it was her "turning point" in her career as she was offered future roles because of her recognition as Aastha.

Parikh appeared in the first Indian television spin-off series on StarPlus, Dil Boley Oberoi (2017), portraying Gauri Kumari Sharma opposite Kunal Jaisingh. In the same year, the network merged the series with StarPlus's drama series Ishqbaaz (2017-2018), in which Parikh continued her portrayal as Gauri until 2018. Gauri Kumari Sharma is a strong, kind-hearted young woman from a small town who faces numerous challenges. Despite her encounters, Gauri maintains her sense of justice and empathy, standing up against wrongdoings and supporting those in need. Her relationship with Omkara Singh Oberoi evolves from conflict to mutual respect and love, highlighting her ability to bring positive change to those around her. Parikh quit the show in 2018 after the series took a generation leap.

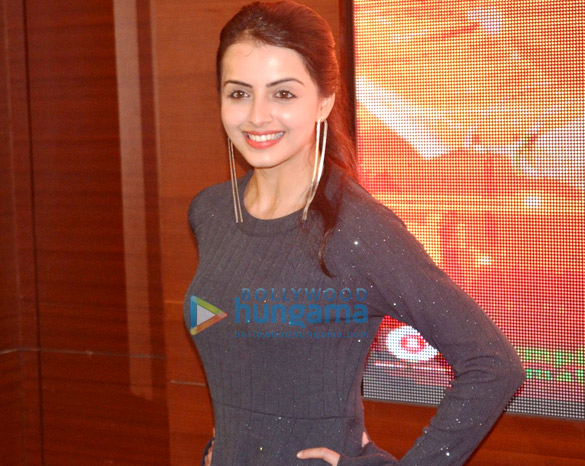
Parikh in 2017 at her film's teaser launch

In 2017, Parikh made her film debut in the 2017 Hindi film Thodi Thodi Si Manmaaniyan. She played the role of Neha Dutta, a spirited and independent young woman who is passionate about music. Siddharth and Neha navigate their personal and professional lives, facing various challenges and growing through their experiences. In 2018, Parikh appeared in her second film, in the Gujarati musical drama Lamboo Rastoo. She portrayed Shruti Yagnik as a supportive and compassionate woman as she and her husband attempt to reconnect with his estranged daughter. The Times of India noted: "Shrenu is a delight to watch on the big screen and share a pretty good onscreen chemistry with Jay Soni. She leaves a mark in some major scenes of the film."

In 2019, Parikh played her first anti-heroine role with StarPlus's revenge thriller series Ek Bhram...Sarvagun Sampanna (2019) opposite Zain Imam. Parikh portrayed Jhanvi Mittal, a woman fueled by revenge to destroy the Mittal family. She appears as the highly desirable daughter-in-law who diligently fulfils her household duties. However, she secretly plots revenge against the family as she holds them accountable for her father's death. Jhanvi is seen as a ruthless woman against her in-laws as she was traumatised since childhood when she witnessed her father trapped in a burning house. She disguised herself as Jhanvi Mittal to hide her real identity, Pooja Sharma. Critics praised her performance and found it to be "convincing".

=== 2021–present: Web series and continued lead roles ===
In 2021, Parikh made her web series debut in a Gujarati political thriller, Kshadyantra (2021), playing Shalini Patel, a woman who is after materialistic greed, with an ambition to escalate her political power. Parikh appeared in the Hindi psychological crime drama web series Damaged 3 (2022). Shrenu Parikh plays the role of Shalini Roy, a complex and intriguing character navigating a world filled with crime and psychological intrigue. Shalini is depicted as a determined and intelligent woman who becomes deeply involved in a series of mysterious and dangerous events.

From 2021 to 2022, she played Genda Agrawal in Ghar Ek Mandir – Kripa Agrasen Maharaj Ki, alongside Akshay Mhatre. The show was filmed in Jaipur.

In 2022, Parikh shot a trailer promo for a Pratilipi FM horror thriller podcast, Chakia Ki Dayan with her former co-star, Avinash Sachdev. Shrenu Parikh plays the role of a courageous and curious woman who finds herself drawn into the mysteries of the village of Chakia, which is haunted by the legend of a dayan (witch). She is shown as a determined and fearless character, driven by a strong sense of justice and a desire to uncover the truth behind the supernatural events plaguing the village.

In 2023, Parikh played a political family member in the film, Family: Politics of Blood. In the same year, she played Maitree Mishra Tiwari opposite Zaan Khan and Samarth Jurel in Maitree. Since October 2025, she played Goddess Parvati in Sony SAB's Gatha Shiv Parivaar Ki — Ganesh Kartikey and the series marks her television comeback after 2 years hiatus.

== Personal life ==
In December 2023, Parikh married her co-star from Ghar Ek Mandir – Kripa Agrasen Maharaj Ki, Akshay Mhatre, in a traditional Hindu wedding ceremony in Vadodara.

== In the media ==
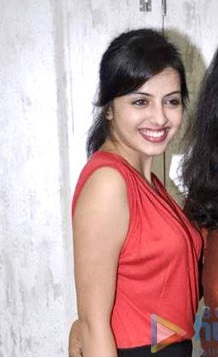
Parikh at an event

Parikh was named the Ahmedabad Times' Most Desirable Women in 2017 and 2018. In Times' Most Desirable Women on TV, she was placed 17th in 2018 and 20th in 2019. The actress has endorsed Santoor soap and also did an advertisement with Vidya Balan. She is known to share a great bond with all her co-stars from Star Plus television show Ishqbaaaz like her on-screen husband Kunal Jaisingh, his real-life wife Bharati Kumar Jaisingh, Mreenal Deshraj, Leenesh Mattoo, Nakuul Mehta and she also attended the wedding ceremonies of Surbhi Chandna, Mansi Srivastava, Nehalaxmi Iyer Joshi and is often seen hanging out with them.

== Filmography ==
=== Television ===
Year	Title	Role	Notes	Ref.
2010	Gulaal	Roopa		
2011	Havan	Aastha		
2012–2013	Byaah Hamari Bahoo Ka	Rajnibala "Rajni" Vaishnav		
2013–2015	Iss Pyaar Ko Kya Naam Doon? Ek Baar Phir	Aastha Agnihotri		
2017	Dil Boley Oberoi	Gauri Trivedi Singh Oberoi		
2017–2018	Ishqbaaaz	Gauri Trivedi Singh Oberoi		
2019	Ek Bhram Sarvagun Sampanna	Pooja "Jahnvi" Sharma Mittal		
2019	Nach Baliye 9	Herself	Special appearance	
2019	Sitaaron Ki Vijayadeshami	Saudamini	Special appearance	
2021–2022	Ghar Ek Mandir – Kripa Agrasen Maharaj Ki	Genda Agrawal		
2023	Maitree	Maitree Mishra Tiwari		
2025	Jaadu Teri Nazar – Daayan Ka Mausam	Kaamini	Cameo	
2025–2026	Gatha Shiv Parivaar Ki — Ganesh Kartikey	Parvati		

=== Films ===
Year	Title	Role	Language	Ref.
2017	Thodi Thodi Si Manmaaniyan	Neha Dutta	Hindi	
2018	Lamboo Rastoo	Shruti Yagnik	Gujarati	
2023	Family: Politics of Blood		Hindi	

=== Web series ===
Year	Title	Role	Language	Notes	Ref.
2021	Kshadyantra	Shalini Patel	Gujarati		
2021	Damaged	Shanaya Roy	Hindi	Season 3	

=== Music videos ===
Year	Title	Singer	Ref.
2020	Ek Dua	Rahul Jain	

== Awards and nominations ==
Year	Award	Category	Work	Result	Ref.
2019	Indian Telly Awards	Best Actress in a Supporting Role	Ishqbaaz	Nominated	
