= Pushkar Sahu =

- Born: 18 May 1980 (age 46); Nathdwara, Rajasthan, India
- Occupations: Screenwriter, Film director
- Years active: 2002–present
- Notable work: Yes Boss (TV series), Saat Phero Ki Hera Pherie, Taarak Mehta Ka Ooltah Chashmah, Office Office

Screenwriter and Director Pushkar Sahu.

Pushkar Sahu Pushkar Sahu is an Indian story, screenplay, and dialogue writer and director. He is best known as one of the writers of India's top comedy show ( Taarak Mehta Ka Ooltah Chashmah )the iconic satirical sitcom (Office Office ) and SAB TV's legendary comedy series Yes Boss. He also served as the lead writer for &TV's high-rated show Aur Bhai Kya Chal Raha Hai?. In addition, he has directed several short films, including the award-winning Rachiyata - The Creator of God, which received a prestigious award from the Department of Culture and Tourism in the Best Cultural category.

== Career ==
Pushkar Sahu has written for some of Hindi television's most iconic comedy shows. Among his notable television writing contributions, he penned over 100 episodes for SAB TV's timeless sitcom Yes Boss, memorable for the comedic dynamic between Meera, Mohan, and Vinod Varma. He has also contributed to India's longest-running comedy sitcom Taarak Mehta Ka Ooltah Chashmah and the classic satire show Office Office.

Furthermore, he served as the lead writer for &TV's hit comedy series Aur Bhai Kya Chal Raha Hai?, which became one of the channel's highest-rated shows, second only to Bhabhi Ji Ghar Par Hai!. In 2022, he briefly joined the writing team of The Kapil Sharma Show before departing early due to professional reasons.

In addition to writing, Pushkar has directed short films, notably Rachiyata - The Creator of God, which was honored by the Department of Culture and Tourism in the Best Cultural Film category. He also collaborated with Sri Adhikari Brothers to produce the daily comedy television show Darling I Love You.Outside of television and film, Sahu is the founder of Pillara Studio LLP, a media and production company.

Early career

Pushkar Sahu started his journey as an assistant writer to Imtiyaaz Patel, writer of Ekta Kapoor's popular TV show Hum Paanch. He assisted him on Aflaatoon, one of India's early daily comedy shows. As an independent writer, he contributed story ideas, episodes, and narrative arcs for the critically acclaimed show Office Office.

In 2004, his original concept LOC - Life Out of Control (based on India-Pakistan themes) was greenlit on Star Plus. Directed by Rajeev Mehra and starring Sanjay Mishra and Manoj Pahwa, the show was shot in London.

In 2005, he wrote Paritosh Painter's Home Sweet Home for Zee Smile and Hukum Mere Aakaa for Sahara One. In 2007, he joined the writing team of the Adhikari Brothers' hit show Yes Boss, going on to write the story, screenplay, and dialogues for over 100 episodes featuring the classic banter of Meera, Mohan, and Varma Ji.

In 2008, he was part of the writing team for Endemol's Raju Haazir Ho on NDTV Imagine (hosted by Raju Srivastava) and contributed gags for Sony TV's Comedy Circus Season 1.

In 2010, in collaboration with Sri Adhikari Brothers, he produced 80 episodes of the daily comedy show Darling I Love You Two for their channels Dabang and Dhamaal. In 2017, he produced Saas Bahu & Shaan Patti for Shemaroo's digital platform and Tata Sky. He also wrote SAB TV's daily comedy show Saat Pheron Ki Hera Pherie, starring Shekhar Suman and Ami Trivedi.

Shows :

- Saat Phero Ki Hera Pherie (Sab TV Writer)
- Yes Boss (TV series) (Sab TV Episode Writer)
- Aflatoon (Sab TV assistant writer)
- Idhar Dhamaal, Udhar Dhamaal (DD Metro Independent writer)
- Sajan Re Jhoot Mat Bolo (Sab TV Episode Writer)
- Office Office (Sab TV Story idea writer)
- Hukum Mere Aakaa (Write 102 Episodes Sahara One)
- Sahab Biwi Ke Gulaam (Story Screenplay Sab TV)
- Mohalla Mohabaatwala(Episode Writer Sab TV)
- Comedy Circus Season (Gags writer Sab TV)
- Gunwale Dulhania Le Jayenge (Story Screenplay Writer. Sab TV)
- Johny Aala Re (Gags Writer ZEE TV)
- Mahisagar (Story Screenplay BIG MAGIC)
- Chalti Ka Naam Gadhhi (Story Screenplay ZEE TV)
- Comedy Ghanta (Gags Writer Zee Smile)
- Home Sweet Home (Writer Zee Smile)
- Saat Pheron Ki Hera Pheri (Writer Sab TV)
- Akbar Birbal (Story Screenplay BIG MAGIC)
- Raju Hazir Ho (Gags Writer NDTV IMAGIN)
- Comedy Club (Gags Writer Sab TV)
- LOC Life Out Of Control (Own Concept STAR PLUS)

== Producer ==
- Darling I Love You Two (Adhikari Brothers channel: Dabang and Dhamaal)
