= Teri Meri Love Stories =

Television series

- Written by: Amit Senchoudhary
- Directed by: Santram Varma
- Starring: Jennifer Winget; Rahul Sharma; Pooja Sharma; Karan Singh Grover; Gautam Rode; Aditi Sharma; Shilpa Anand; Viraf Patel; Mudit Nayar; Karan Wahi; Arjun Bijlani; Mahhi Vij; Shaheer Sheikh; Sargun Mehta; Iqbal Khan; Ravi Dubey; Karan Patel; Divyanka Tripathi Dahiya; Anita Hassanandani; Hina Khan; Barun Sobti; Sanaya Irani; Ragini Khanna; Pooja Gor; Chhavi Pandey
- Opening theme: Teri Meri Love Stories
- Country of origin: India
- Original language: Hindi
- No. of seasons: 1
- No. of episodes: 16

Production
- Production locations: Mumbai, Maharashtra
- Production company: Ravi Ojha Production

Original release
- Network: StarPlus
- Release: 11 August – 6 October 2012

Teri Meri Love Stories (Our Love Stories) is an anthology series of 90-minute telefilms promoted as a "collection of assorted love stories" which premiered on 11 August 2012 on StarPlus. The series aired on weekends and featured many actors.

== Plot ==
A series of 16 heart-warming stories about complicated relationships revolving around love, heartbreaks, trust and betrayal.

== Episodes ==
Episode no.	Title	On air date
1	Twist Wala Love	11 August 2012
2	A Love Triangle	12 August 2012
3	A Second Chance	18 August 2012
4	Love Or Career?	19 August 2012
5	Songs Of Love	25 August 2012
6	Childhood Sweethearts	26 August 2012
7	Destined For Love	1 September 2012
8	A Gangster's Love Story	2 September 2012
9	Love Comes In All Colours	8 September 2012
10	Waiting For The Muse?	9 September 2012
11	Are Marriages Made In Heaven?	15 September 2012
12	Opposites Attracts	16 September 2012
13	Trust, Love And Betrayal	22 September 2012
14	Love Will Find Its Way (Full Circle)	29 September 2012
15	All You Need Is Love	30 September 2012
16	Love Beats Separation	6 October 2012

== Cast ==
- Episode 01: Twist Wala Love
  - Mala Salariya as Sunaina,
  - Gautam Rode as Tarun,
  - Kushal Punjabi as Karthik
  - Dimple Jhangiani as Anjali
- Episode 02: A Love Triangle
  - Shilpa Anand as Meera,
  - Viraf Patel as Shreshth
  - Mudit Nayar as Keshav
- Episode 03: A Second Chance
  - Karan Singh Grover as Raghu
  - Anita Hassanandani as Simran
- Episode 04: Love Or Career?
  - Karan Wahi as Ritesh
  - Chhavi Pandey as Smitha
- Episode 05: Songs Of Love
  - Avinash Sachdev as Ishan
  - Shafaq Naaz as Pari
- Episode 06: Childhood Sweethearts:
  - Jennifer Winget Niti,
  - Keith Sequeira as Vivan
  - Akanksha Kapil as Vivan's wife
- Episode 07: Destined For Love
  - Umang Jain as Kareena
  - Rahul Sharma as Aryan
- Episode 08: A Gangster's Love Story
  - Arjun Bijlani as Raghu
  - Neha Janpandit as Naina
- Episode 09: Love Comes In All Colours
  - Amit Varma as Madhav
  - Vandana Gupta as Priya
- Episode 10: Waiting For The Muse?
  - Abhay Vakil as Onir
  - Ankita Maheswari as Pihu/Roopali
- Episode 11: Are Marriages Made In Heaven?
  - Mahii Vij as Saloni
  - Shaheer Sheikh as Nityanand
- Episode 12: Opposites Attracts
  - Karan Kundra as Karan
  - Pooja Sharma as Sia
- Episode 13: Trust, Love And Betrayal:
  - Karan Patel as Yug Saxena
  - Sargun Mehta as Anika
- Episode 14: Love Will Find Its Way (Full Circle)
  - Iqbal Khan as Nikhil
  - Divyanka Tripathi Dahiya as Nikita
- Episode 15: All You Need Is Love
  - Ravi Dubey as Mukul
  - Vandana Joshi as Jahnvi
- Episode 16: Love Beats Separation
  - Karan Grover as Rohit
  - Aditi Sharma as Anjali

=== Guest appearances ===
Actor	Character	Description
Sanaya Irani	Khushi Kumari Gupta Singh Raizada	From Iss Pyaar Ko Kya Naam Doon?
Barun Sobti	Arnav Singh Raizada	From Iss Pyaar Ko Kya Naam Doon?
Hina Khan	Akshara Maheshwari Singhania	From Yeh Rishta Kya Kehlata Hai
Deepika Singh	Sandhya Rathi	From Diya Aur Baati Hum
Ragini Khanna	Suhana Kashyap	From Sasural Genda Phool
Mohammad Nazim	Ahem Modi	From Saath Nibhaana Saathiya
Devoleena Bhattacharjee	Gopi Kapadia Modi	From Saath Nibhaana Saathiya
Nia Sharma	Manvi Chaudhary Vadhera	From Ek Hazaaron Mein Meri Behna Hai
Krystle D'Souza	Jeevika Chaudhary Vadhera	From Ek Hazaaron Mein Meri Behna Hai
Karan Tacker	Viren Singh Vadhera	From Ek Hazaaron Mein Meri Behna Hai
Pooja Gor	Pratigya Singh	From Mann Kee Awaaz Pratigya
