= Charu Asopa =

Indian television actress (born 1988)

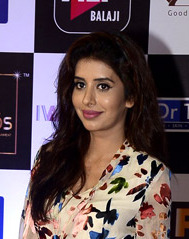
- Charu Asopa in 2018
- Born: 27 February 1988 (age 38); Bikaner, Rajasthan, India
- Occupations: Actress; model
- Years active: 2009–present
- Known for: Baalveer; Mere Angne Mein
- Spouse(s): Somveer Pujari (m. 2007; div. 2016) Rajeev Sen (m. 2019; div. 2023)
- Children: Ziana Sen

Charu Asopa (born 27 February 1988) is an Indian television actress and vlogger. She is known for portraying Rajkumari Revati in Devon Ke Dev...Mahadev, most loved Atkhati Pari in Baalveer, Preeti Srivastav Mere Angne Mein, Shravani "Piyali" Purohit in Jiji Maa and as Mridula in Kaisa Hai Yeh Rishta Anjana.

== Personal life ==
Charu Asopa is originally from Bikaner in the state of Rajasthan. Her father has retired from a government job. She has one sister and one brother. She initially married a Marwari businessman from Rajasthan in 2007. The marriage ended in November 2016 due to compatibility issues. Charu then entered into a relationship with fellow actor Neeraj Malviya, and the couple became engaged in Rajasthan. However, the engagement was called off in 2017. In June 2019, she married Sushmita Sen's younger brother, Rajeev Sen. The couple were often in the news for compatibility issues. They divorced in 2023, Charu and Rajeev have one daughter together.

== Filmography ==
Year	Film	Role	Notes
2011	Impatient Vivek	Rani	Debut film
2017	Call for Fun	Sush	Main Female Lead
2017	Yolk	Nandini	Main Female Lead
2023	Johri	Tani	Main Female Lead

== Television ==
Year	Serial	Role	Notes
2009–2010	Agle Janam Mohe Bitiya Hi Kijo	Surabhi	Main Female Antagonist
2010	Bhagyavidhaata	Poorva Prasad	Adopted by Bindiya
2010–2011	Yeh Rishta Kya Kehlata Hai	Sneha	Naitik's colleague
2012–2013	Bade Achhe Lagte Hain	Saudamini	Supporting Role (Friend of Ayesha Sharma)
2012–2015	Baal Veer	Atkhati Pari	Protagonist Supporting role
2011–2012	Devon Ke Dev...Mahadev	Princess Revati	Sati and Rohini's sister and wife of Chandra
2013	Chhanchhan	Simple	Chhanchhan's friend
2013	Buddha	Prakriti	Rajkumar Anand's lover
2013	Fear Files	Riya (Episode 116)	Episodic role
2014	Love by Chance	Chandni	Lead role
2014	Diya Aur Baati Hum	Roma Reddy	Main Female Antagonist
2014	Maharakshak: Aryan	Supriya/Vishkanya	Triloki's Murderer
2014	Phir Jeene Ki Tamanna Hai		Main Female antagonist
2014–15	Lakeeren Kismat Ki	Lawyer Asha	Main Female antagonist
2015	Gumrah: End of Innocence		Episodic
2015–2017	Mere Angne Mein	Preeti Raghav Shrivastav	(Protagonist turned Antagonist/Reformed at the end)
2015	Maharakshak: Devi	Tanya	Devi's friend
2016	Tashan-e-Ishq	Dr Pallavi	Parallel Antagonist
2018	Laado 2	Kajal Kuldeep Sethi	Parallel Lead role
2018	Kaun Hai?	Rani (Pravesh's gf)	Episodic Role (ep-14)
2018	Jiji Maa	Piyali Sehgal (Kittu)	Main Female Antagonist
2019	Karn Sangini	Kasturi	Main Female Antagonist
2019	Vikram Betaal Ki Rahasya Gatha	Nayantara	Main Female Antagonist
2020	Akbar Ka Bal Birbal	Tarabai	Main Female Protagonist
2021	Kyun Utthe Dil Chhod Aaye	Zohra Bai	Dancer (Cameo)
2023–2024	Kaisa Hai Yeh Rishta Anjana	Mridula Rajat Chauhan	Main Female Antagonist
