= Ek Rishta Aisa Bhi =

Indian drama television series

- Created by: Sumeet Hukamchand Mittal; Shashi Mittal
- Written by: Shobhit Jaiswal; Divya
- Directed by: Mann Singh Manku; Prabhat Prabhakar; Jaffar SK
- Starring: See Below
- Theme music composer: Ritesh Rathore
- Opening theme: Ek Rishta Aisa Bhi
- Country of origin: India
- Original language: Hindi
- No. of seasons: 1
- No. of episodes: 133

Production
- Executive producer: Sheetal Somani
- Producers: Shashi Mittal; Sumeet Hukamchand Mittal
- Editor: K. Rajgopal
- Running time: 22 mins
- Production company: Shashi Sumeet Productions

Original release
- Network: Sony Pal
- Release: 1 September 2014 – 13 February 2015

Ek Rishta Aisa Bhi is an Indian television series broadcast on Sony Pal produced by Shashi Sumeet Productions. Set in the city of Bhopal, the show aired from 1 September 2014 till 13 February 2015.

== Story ==
Sonia lives with her five younger sisters and runs a fancy dress store. After their parents died, Sonia took the responsibility of her sisters. As a result, she has decided to first marry off her sisters and then find someone for herself. The dress store receives an order from leading textile designer Ratna Roy to decorate her house for a festival. Ratna has a son Raghav. A series of misunderstandings leads Sonia's sisters to think that Raghav is Sonia's boyfriend. Pestered by her sisters, Sonia gives in and tells them that his name is Bobby ji even though Raghav and Sonia do not know each other.

Weeks later, Raghav becomes an apprentice to Khan Chacha, who is an old friend of his lost father and also the owner of the restaurant adjacent to Sonia's store. The sisters soon run into Raghav and assume him to be Bobby ji and strike up a friendship with him. Eventually, Sonia reveals the truth to Raghav who promises to help her. With time, they fall in love and are married.

Sonia wins the hearts of Raghav's family members with her sense of duty and love towards everyone in his family. She promises his mother that she will go to any lengths to reunite the family with Raghav's estranged brother, Abhiman. Abhiman and Deepika, Sonia's younger sister, fall in love. On a day when Abhiman is confronted with the truth of his mother's sacrifices for the family, he becomes upset and leaves home but is chased by Sonia and Deepika. Lost in thought, when he is about to be hit by a car, Sonia sacrifices herself to save him and is killed in the accident leaving Raghav, his family, and her sisters heartbroken. Her death leads to Deepika breaking up with Abhiman and Raghav deciding to leave his own home and devote himself to caring for Sonia's sisters. Raghav and sisters moves to sonia's former house as they hates Abhiman who they think is the reason of sonia's death. Abhiman, who is guilty to be the reason behind the unhappiness in the family decides to bring back Raghav to the house. He tries to help them in various ways but they refuse to forgive him. After some time we get a guy who comes with an arranged proposal to marry Rathi; Rathi's marriage is set and Abhiman tells everyone what actually happened.

Thus, the show ends with reconciliation of Deepika and Abhiman and Raghav forgiving Abhiman. At the end we see a girl maybe Raghav will have someone now to share his remaining life with.

== Cast ==
- Preeti Chaudhary as Sonia Sharma / Sonia Raghav Roy
- Ekta Kaul
- Rahul Sharma as Raghav Roy
- Amrita Prakash as Deepika "Deepu" Sharma / Deepika Abhimaan Roy
- Divyangana Jain as Rati Sharma
- Farhina Pervez Jarimari as Anjali Sharma
- Divya Naaz as Khushi Sharma
- Palak Dey as Frooti Sharma
- Anshul Trivedi as Abhimaan Roy
- Anjali Mukhi as Ratna Roy, Raghav's mother
- Farida Dadi as Raghav's grandmother
- Susheel Parashar as Raghav's grandfather
- Sheela Sharma as Raghav's paternal aunt
- Priyamvada Kant as Samaira
- Adaa Khan as Pia
- Gopichand as Kalimuthu Sethupathi
- Nithya Menen as Nithya - to promote Gopichand's film
