= Kaisa Hai Yeh Rishta Anjaana =

Indian drama television series

- Genre: Drama; Romantic
- Created by: Gaurav Prem Shree
- Story by: Prakash Mani Tiwari; Pavani; Malvika Asthana; Dialogues; Shilpa Rathi
- Directed by: Vinod Rautela; Vikas Srivastav
- Starring: Rahul Sharma; Saachi Tiwari
- Theme music composer: Ripul Sharma; Prakash Viraj; Gaurav Joshi
- Opening theme: "Kaisa Hai Ye Rishta Anjana"
- Country of origin: India
- Original language: Hindi
- No. of seasons: 1
- No. of episodes: 282

Production
- Producers: Jagmohan Ravat; Gaurav Prem Shree
- Editor: Ajay Saroj Singh
- Camera setup: Multi-Camera
- Running time: 22-24 minutes
- Production company: S3 Infomedia Private Limited

Original release
- Network: Dangal
- Release: 26 June 2023 – 19 May 2024

Kaisa hai Yeh Rishta Anjaana (transl. What kind of unknown relationship is this?) is an Indian drama series produced by S3 Infomedia Private Limited. It premiered on 26 June 2023 on Dangal. It stars Rahul Sharma and Saachi Tiwari.

== Plot ==
Anmol, a young girl from a village, finds herself in an arranged marriage that was not of her choosing. She is meant to marry Raman, but on her wedding day, she ends up marrying the already married Rajat. Despite her reservations, she feels compelled to uphold her commitment, concealing her deep sense of disappointment which eventually blossoms into love.

== Cast ==
=== Main ===
- Saachi Tiwari as Anmol "Amu" Chaudhary Chauhan: Yashoda and Ratan's daughter; Uday and Ajay's sister; Raman's ex fiance; Rajat's wife; Divyasa's stepmother
- Rahul Sharma as Rajat Chauhan: Vijay and Sunehri's elder son; Raman's elder brother; Anmol's husband; Mridula's ex-husband; Divyasa's father

=== Recurring ===
- Gaurav Raj Puri as Raman Chauhan: Vijay and Sunehri's younger son; Rajat's younger brother; Anmol's ex-fiance; Bhoomi's husband (2023–present )
- Charu Asopa as Mridula Chauhan: Rajat's ex-wife; Divyasa's mother (2023-2024)
- Kiara Chouhan as Divyasa Chauhan: Rajat and Mridula's daughter; Anmol's stepdaughter
- Akshay Verma as Vijay Chauhan: Kalyani's younger brother; Sunehri's husband; Rajat and Raman's father; Divyasa's grandfather
- Nilam Pathania Abrol as Sunheri Chauhan: Vijay's wife; Rajat and Raman's mother; Divyasa's grandmother
- Kanchan Gupta as Kalyani Chauhan Singh: Vijay's elder sister; Bhola's wife; Nandini's mother
- Raja Chaudhary as Bhola Singh: Kalyani's husband; Nandini's father
- Chhaya Phanse as Nandini Singh Chaudhary: Kalyani and Bhola's daughter; Ajay's ex love interest and ex fiance; Uday's wife
- Natasha Rana as Yashoda Chaudhary: Ratan 's wife; Anmol, Uday, and Ajay's mother
- Anil Lalwani as Uday Chaudhary: Yashoda and Ratan's elder son; Anmol and Ajay's elder brother; Nandini's husband
- Puneet Channa as Ajay Chaudhary: Yashoda and Ratan's younger son; Anmol and Uday's brother; Nandini's ex-love interest and ex fiance
- Munendra Singh Kushwah as Inspector Arvind Sharma
- Drisha Kalyani as Lali: Raman's ex-fiancée
- Diksha Nisha as Bhoomi Chauhan: Raman 's wife
- Snehal Borkar
- Shubhi Sharma

== Production ==
=== Casting ===
Initially, Shaleen Malhotra was in talks to play male lead but later backed out for personal reasons. Rahul Sharma and Saachi Tiwari were signed as the lead. Charu Asopa was cast to play the negative lead.

In July 2023, Asopa along with 200 cast and crew members got stuck inside the sets for 2 days due to the torrential outpour in Mumbai.

In April 2024, Charu Asopa quit the show.

=== Release ===
The first promo was released in June 2023.It was Released on 26 June 2023 and It replaced Bindiya Sarkar.

== Soundtrack ==
Kaisa Hai Yeh Rishta Anjana

Soundtrack album
- Released: 2023
- Genres: Romance; Soundtrack
- Length: 1:23
- Language: Hindi
- Label: Enterr10 Television Network

Tracklisting
No.	Title	Length
1.	"Kaisa Hai Yeh Rishta Anjana"	1:23
2.	"Chaand Tare Gawah Hai"	1:50

== See also ==
- List of programmes broadcast by Dangal TV
