= Main Bhi Ardhangini =

Indian television series

- Genre: Drama; Romance; Horror
- Written by: Jayesh Patil; Gopal Kulkarni; Soumyava; Nitika Kanwar; Arundhati Sharma; Surbhi
- Starring: Avinash Sachdev; Ankit Raj; Anjali Priya; Adityarao Nuniwal; Aditi Rawat
- Country of origin: India
- Original language: Hindi
- No. of seasons: 2
- No. of episodes: 200

Production
- Producer: Essel Vision Productions
- Running time: 22 minutes

Original release
- Network: And TV
- Release: 21 January – 1 November 2019

Related
- Yaaradi Nee Mohini

Main Bhi Ardhangini (transl. I am also yours) is an Indian Hindi language television series that aired from 21 January 2019 to 1 November 2019 on And TV. It is the official remake of Zee Tamil's TV series Yaaradi Nee Mohini. It starred Avinash Sachdev, Aditi Rawat, Anjali Priya and Deepshikha Nagpal.

Season one ended on 27 July 2019 and focused on the union of Madhav and Vaidehi through the power of Madhav's ex-wife and the resistance of Madhav's mother. Season two began on 30 July 2019 and ended on 1 November 2019 shifting its focus on horror and thriller. Season two brought the addition of new cast.

== Plot ==
=== Season 1 ===
Madhav is a widower who lives with the memories of his beloved wife Chitra. However, her spirit returns to haunt those who did her wrong and also tries to unite Madhav with his childhood friend Vaidehi.

== Cast ==
=== Season 1 ===
- Avinash Sachdev as Madhav Singh Thakur:
- Aditi Rawat as Vaidehi Sharma / Vaidehi Madhav Singh Thakur
- Anjali Priya as Chitra Khanna / Chitra Madhav Singh Thakur
- Deepshikha Nagpal as Nilambari Thakur
- Krutika Desai as Shweta
- Ajay Chakraborty as Narayandas Thakur
- Shashank Mishra as Lavish "Lalten" Joshi
- Gulshan Tushir as Jaichand
- Adityarao Nuniwal as Sangram Thakur:
- Diksha Dhami as Anuradha Sangram Thakur

=== Season 2 ===
- Ankit Raj as Adhiraj, an Eagle
- Heena Parmar as Mohini / Malmal
- Deepshikha Nagpal as Mahamaya Nilambari
- Saloni Jain as Fauzia
- Meer Ali as Naagraj Bhujang
- Megha Rawat as Vasudha
- Rahul Trivedi as Chander
- Rohit Bakshi as Vikrant
- Tejaswi Bhadane as Vikrant's daughter

==== Extended Guest Appearances ====
- Kriti Sanon as Heera
- Rakul Preet Singh as Priya
- Puneeth Rajkumar as Mohan
- Sivakarthikeyan as Vijay
- Shraddha Arya as Preeta from Kundali Bhagya
