= Friends: Conditions Apply =

Television series

- Genre: Thriller
- Starring: See below
- Country of origin: India
- Original language: Hindi
- No. of seasons: 1
- No. of episodes: 27

Production
- Producer: Kabir Sadanand
- Cinematography: Milind Jog

Original release
- Network: Channel V India
- Release: 8 December 2014 – 4 February 2015

Friends: Conditions Apply is an Indian TV series that first aired on Channel V India on 8 December 2014. The show was produced by actor turned producer Kabir Sadanand under his banner Frog Unlimited.

Written by Siddhartha Vankar, the show went on a seasonal break, but later it was reported that plans of its comeback were on hold.

== Overview ==
Friends: Conditions Apply revolves around Shakti Rai who witnesses her parents' murder at a very young age. The only person left standing by her is Rajneil Purohit, her guardian. Shakti is suffering from an anxiety disorder for which she takes medications. She has a childhood friend named Murli whom she regards as her elder brother.

Years later, Shakti finds her guardian chained in a prison cell. Shakti believes he is innocent and vows to get him released. Shakti and Murli devise a plan to get a few high-profile wealthy kids kidnapped and then pressure the government into trading Rajneil in exchange for the kids. Shakti plans to have her own friends involved in this. Her plan works eventually but she finds herself facing an unexpected turn of events.

== Cast ==
- Shivani Tomar as Shakti Rai
- Adnan Khan as Omar
- Nitin Chauhaan as Murli
- Dhiraj Totlani as Binoy
- Pooja Singh as Isha
- Sagar Shetty as Chirag
- Neha Tomar as Juhi
- Gulshan Nain as Imple
- Amit Behl as Rajneil Purohit
- Sangam Rai as Balli
- Deepali Muchrikar as Tara
- Hargun Grover as Agni
- Prashant Ranyal as Major Vikram
