= Salina Prakash =

Indian television actress

Salina Prakash is an actress from Chandigarh, India.

== Television ==
Year	Show	Role	Ref
2019	Nazar	Prathmayan	
2017	Iss Pyaar Ko Kya Naam Doon 3	Shakun	
2013	Ek Ghar Banaunga	Kanu	
2012	Devon Ken Dev...Mahadev	Saraswati	
