= Mitegi Laxman Rekha =

Indian television series

- Genre: Drama
- Created by: Sumeet Hukamchand Mittal; Shashi Mittal
- Written by: Raghuvir Shekhawat Namrata Ramsay Damini Joshi Neelam Pandey
- Screenplay by: Damini Joshi
- Directed by: Dharmendra sharma
- Creative director: Pushpa Porwal
- Starring: Rahul Sharma; Shivani Tomar
- Country of origin: India
- Original language: Hindi
- No. of seasons: 1
- No. of episodes: 70

Production
- Producers: Shashi Sumeet Mittal; Sumeet Hukamchand Mittal
- Production location: Mumbai
- Cinematography: Gulshan Kumar
- Camera setup: Multi-camera
- Running time: 24 minutes (approx)
- Production company: Shashi Sumeet Productions

Original release
- Network: &TV
- Release: 28 May – 31 August 2018

Mitegi Lakshmanrekha was an Indian television series, which aired on &TV from 28 May 2018 to 31 August 2018. The show was produced by Shashi Sumeet Mittal and Sumeet Hukamchand Mittal and starred Rahul Sharma and Shivani Tomar.

== Plot ==
The show revolves around the concept of boundaries for women, giving perspective on how it has been twisted into a cage, limiting women instead of serving their original purpose.

Kanchan is a young woman who has never been weighed down by boundaries. On the surface, she appears to be fearless and put together but is actually battling internal dilemmas. Her life takes a turn when she crosses paths with Vishesh, who has a similar outlook towards life yet doesn't give in to the patriarchal mindset of society. Her demons hold her back from giving into her love for him and taking their relationship forward.

== Cast ==
- Rahul Sharma as Vishesh
- Shivani Tomar as Kanchan
- Vaishnavi Mahant as Devyani, Vishesh's mother
- Rahul Lohani as Saurabh Thakur
- Ravi Gossain as Nandan, Kanchan's father
- Jayshree T. as Dadi
- Amrin Chakkiwala as Ananya, Vishesh's sister
- Akshita Mudgal as Keerti, Kanchan's sister
- Ankita Goraya as Sheetal, Kanchan's cousin
- Nitin Bhatia as Jaggi, Vishesh's best friend, Sheetal's husband
- Neerav Soni as Shubham, Vishesh's cousin brother
- Ankita Bahuguna as Dhara, Shubham's wife
- Karuna Verma as Shubham's mother, Vishesh aunt (chachi)
- Amit Singh Thakur as Shubham's father, Vishesh's uncle
- Rajeev Saxena as Baldev, Nandan's brother, Kanchan's uncle (Sheetal's father)
- as Dr. Aman (guest), later Devyani's friend's son, Vishesh's childhood friend
- Rishina Kandhari as Trishna Saurabh Thakur, Saurabh's wife
- Avdeep Sidhu as Ananya's husband
- Shrashti Maheshwari as Saurabh's sister
- Ayesha Vindhara as Mishti Thakur, Saurabh and Trishna's daughter
