= Ganesh Kartikey =

Indian mythology television series

- Genre: Mythology
- Created by: Anirudh Pathak
- Based on: SHIV PURAN AND GANESH PURAN
- Screenplay by: C L SAINI; Santosh; Brijmohan Pandey
- Story by: C L SAINI; Brijmohan Pandey; Dr. Venke
- Directed by: Saranga Dutta; Prarthana Goswami
- Creative directors: Tushar J. Bhatia; Dhiren Mishra
- Starring: Shrenu Parikh; Avinesh Rekhi; Mohit Malik
- Music by: Javed Ali (Opening song); Anirudh Suswaram; Chaitanya Devadhe
- Composers: Nakul Abhyankar; Sandeep Mukharjee (Theme music)
- Country of origin: India
- Original language: Hindi
- No. of episodes: 156

Production
- Producers: Alind Srivastava; Nissar Parvej; Hitesh Thakkar
- Cinematography: Sandeep Yadav
- Editors: Waseed Hussain; Ankush Ambre
- Camera setup: Multi-camera
- Running time: 21 minutes
- Production company: Peninsula Pictures

Original release
- Network: Sony SAB
- Release: 6 October 2025 – 4 April 2026

Gatha Shiv Parivaar Ki — Ganesh Kartikey also known as Ganesh Kartikey is an Indian Hindi-language television mythology series that aired on Sony SAB from 6 October 2025 to 4 April 2026 and is digitally available on SonyLIV. Produced by Peninsula Pictures, it starred Shrenu Parikh, Avinesh Rekhi, Mohit Malik, Subhan Khan and Nirnay Samadhiya.

== Cast ==
=== Main ===
- Mohit Malik / Avinesh Rekhi as Shiva; Veerabhadra
- Shrenu Parikh as Parvati; Durga; Maa Kali; Sati
- Subhan Khan as Kartikeya; Murugan
- Aayudh Bhanushali / Ekansh Kathrotiya / Nirnay Samadhiya as Ganesh

=== Recurring ===
- Sandeep Mohan / Radhakrishna Dutt as Brahma
- Priyanka Nayan / Pooja Sahu as Devi Saraswati
- Vikas Salgotra as Vishnu
- Neetha Shetty / Ragini Rishi / Benazir Shaikh / Sareeka Dhillon as Devi Lakshmi
- Narayani Varne as Riddhi
- Shreya Patel as Siddhi
- Pari Kapoor as Devasena
- Sanchi Kaur / Sneha Kaur as Valli
- Danish Akhtar Saifi as Nandi
- Aruhi Singh as Jaya
- Upasana Rath as Vijaya
- Karan Suchak / Meer Ali as Indra
- Lavina Tandon / Sangeetha Odwani as Indrani
- Daksh Sharma as Narada
- Shridhar Watsar as Mushakraj
- Akash Kapoor as Pawan Dev
- Jaydeep Kalsi as Chandra Dev
- Meghna Malik / Achint Kaur as Diti
- Sonia Singh as Varangi: Surapadma and Tarakasura's mother
- Nirbhay Wadhwa as Sindhurasur
- Ankit Mohan as Surapadma
- Vinit Kakar as Simhamukhasur
- Prasoon Arya as Kalkeya
- Rohit Khurana as Gajasura
- Kumar Hegde as Virabahu
- Athar Siddiqui as Agnidev
- Talluri Rameswari as Avvai Bamma
- Rivaan Thakkar as Sravan: Valli's friend
- Yug Bhanushali as Skand: Valli's friend
- Sameer Deshpande as Rishi Atri
- Om Mutrak as Dattatreya
- Raviz Thakur as Parashurama
- Kriti Choudhary as Ganga
- Sakshi Benipuri as Devi Adishakthi
- Divyangana Jain, Neha Badiswal, (and 4 others) as 6 Krittikas, Kartikeya's foster mothers
- Aamir Dalvi as Tarakasura
- Rushiraj Pawar as Shanidev
- Bhakti Chauhan as Shambhuki,Tarakasura's wife
- Jameel Choudhary as Nagasur

=== Cameo ===
- Bijay Anand as Vyasa

== Production ==
=== Casting ===
Mohit Malik plays the role of the Hindu deity Shiva. Shrenu Parikh was brought in to play the role of the Hindu deity Parvati and this series marks Parikh's return to television after a 2-year hiatus. Ekansh Kathrotiya and Subhan Khan play the roles of Ganesh and Kartikey respectively.
