= Meer Ali =

Indian television actor and model

- Born: India
- Occupations: Actor; Model
- Years active: 2010–present

Meer Ali is an Indian television actor and a fashion model. He was seen playing lead in Main Bhi Ardhangini and was portraying Devraj Indra in Vighnaharta Ganesha for which he was nominated in the category (Best actor in a Negative role). He also played lead in shows like SuperCops Vs Super Villains, Miley Jab Hum Tum, Dahleez, and was also seen in several shows such as Shubharambh, Alif Laila 2, Kahath Hanuman, and in some mega stories of Private Investigator, Savdhaan India, Aahat (season 6) and CID. He also portrayed Chandra dev in the Shiv Shakti – Tap Tyaag Tandav.

== Filmography ==
Year	Show	Role
2009	CID	Vicky-Episode 565
2010	Miley Jab Hum Tum	Nirbhay Awasthy
2011–2012	Navya..Naye Dhadkan Naye Sawaal	Harry
2013–2014	SuperCops Vs Super Villains	Anurag Mizra
2014–2015	Savdhaan India	Episodic Roles
2015	Private Investigator	Episodic
2015	Aahat	Episodic
2015	Sadda Haq	Vivek Chauhan
2016	Dahleez	IAS Jaidev Sinha
2017–2021	Vighnaharta Ganesha	Indra
2019	Main Bhi Ardhangini	Naagraj Bhujang
2020	Alif Laila	Shahzama
2020	Shubharambh	Hitank Reshammiya
2020–2023	RadhaKrishn	Indra
2022	Swaraj	Peshwa Bajirao
2022	Dharm Yoddha Garud	Mahishasur
2023–2025	Shiv Shakti – Tap Tyaag Tandav	Chandra
2024	Tulsidham Ke Laddu Gopal	Indra
2024	Lakshmi Narayan – Sukh Samarthya Santulan	Chandra
2024–2025	Shrimad Ramayan	Indra
2025	Veer Hanuman	Indra
2025–2026	Ganesh Kartikey	Indra
