= Ek Ghar Banaunga =

- Also known as: Sapnon Se Pyaara Ek Ghar Banaunga
- Genre: Indian soap opera Drama
- Written by: Rakesh Paswan; Sandeep Nath; Siddhartha Vankar
- Directed by: Prabhat Prabhakar; Vinod Laxmi Kumar
- Creative director: Neha Kothari
- Starring: List of cast members
- Composer: Aashish Rego
- Country of origin: India
- Original language: Hindi
- No. of seasons: 1
- No. of episodes: 309

Production
- Producer: Rakesh Paswan
- Production locations: Lucknow; Sitapur; Bhagwanpura
- Editors: Janak Chauhan; Anil Vaishya
- Running time: 21 minutes
- Production company: Village Boy Production

Original release
- Network: StarPlus
- Release: 29 April 2013 – 7 June 2014

Ek Ghar Banaunga (English: I Will Make a Family Home) is an Indian television soap opera broadcast on StarPlus. The series premiered on 29 April 2013 and 7 June 2014 which starred Rahul Sharma and Ishita Dutta.

== Synopsis ==
Poonam, is faced with the dilemma of how to provide for her parents when she is not around after her marriage, because an ancient Indian tradition says "post marriage, a girl is expected to leave her parental home and take care of her in-laws." Poonam's only brother has settled in the United States, and could not care less about his responsibility for his parents, as he considers them a burden. But life has planned something else for Poonam – her marriage is fixed with Gautam, who comes from a selfish, greedy and conspiring family who does not care about the marriage, but only for the dowry which they demanded for. On her wedding day to Gautam, Poonam realises the true colours of Gautam's family, and breaks her marriage with him. On the same day, she is married to Aakash, the male protagonist of the story, as well as Poonam's wedding planner, who had been secretly in love with her. Poonam's family decides this marriage, as Aakash is a sensible man and after this day no one else would want to marry Poonam. The problem arises, as Aakash marries Poonam without informing his family, and his family utterly rejects Poonam. However, Poonam is given six months to leave the house, but in that time she wins everybody's heart and becomes an ideal daughter-in-law. Meanwhile, Poonam's parents are left alone to cope with their situation when Aakash sees her concern and decides to bring her parents' home. The problem starts when both parents and the in-laws of the protagonists start staying together. Eventually, Poonam's family too settles down. The rest of the story is the ongoing drama between the households of these two families.

== Cast ==
- Ishita Dutta as Poonam Akash Garg
- Rahul Sharma as Akash Garg
- Narendra Jha / Hemant Choudhary as Shashikant Garg
- Neelima Parandekar as Mangaladevi Shashikant Garg
- Mahaveer Mehta as Rajesh
- Salina Prakash as Kanika Jai Garg / Kannu
- Pyumori Mehta as Vandana Nath
- Prachi Parab as Prarthana
- Mukesh Nathani as Ravikant Garg
- Bharti Patil as Ravikant's wife
- Ram Mehar Jangra as Ramesh
- Priya Shinde as Dolly
- Ankit Arora as Abhishek Ravikant Garg
- Itishree Singh as Sarita Abhishek Garg
- Urvashi Upadhyay as Parulben
- Sachin Chabra as Gautam
- Pratayush Sing as Vilion
- Ravi Singh as Raghav
- Mohit Sinha as Radhe
- Shahbaz Khan as Mata singh
- Swati Anant as Aarti
