= Shivani Tomar =

Indian actress

- Born: 9 February 1992 (age 34); New Delhi, India
- Occupation: Actress
- Years active: 2012–present
- Known for: Friends: Conditions Apply; Iss Pyaar Ko Kya Naam Doon 3 Mitegi Laxman Rekha; Agni Vayu

Shivani Tomar is an Indian actress who mainly works in Hindi television. She made her acting debut in 2012 with Gumrah: End of Innocence. She is best known for her portrayal of Shakti Rai in Friends: Conditions Apply, Chandni Narayan in Iss Pyaar Ko Kya Naam Doon 3, Kanchan in Mitegi Laxman Rekha and Dr. Agni Awasthi in Agni Vayu.

== Early life ==
Tomar was born and brought up in New Delhi. She did a commercial art course from an institute in Lajpat Nagar, Delhi.

== Career ==
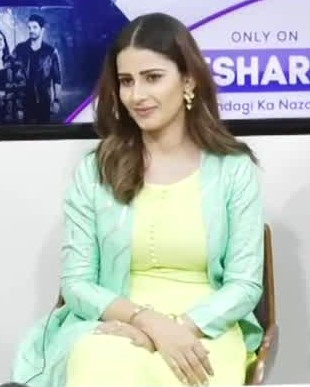
Tomar at Agni Vayu launch

Tomar made her acting debut in 2012 with an episode of Gumrah: End of Innocence. In 2013, she portrayed Ruchita Karanjkar in Pavitra Rishta and Meenal Kashyap in Crazy Stupid Ishq. She then portrayed Swati from in Iss Pyaar Ko Kya Naam Doon? Ek Baar Phir.

From 2014 to 2015, she portrayed Shakti Rai in Friends: Conditions Apply. She portrayed Shakti Gupta in Hum Aapke Ghar Mein Rehte Hain in 2015 and Tanuja Sikand in Kasam Tere Pyaar Ki in 2016.

Tomar's portrayal of Chandni Narayan Vashishth in Iss Pyaar Ko Kya Naam Doon 3 in 2017, marked a turning point in her career. She then appeared in Vani Rani.

In 2018, she portrayed Kanchan in Mitegi Laxman Rekha and in 2021, she portrayed Dr. Agni Awasthi in Agni Vayu. In 2022, she made her web debut with Mr Aur Mrs LLB portraying Advocate Payal Agarwal.

== Filmography ==
=== Television ===
Year	Title	Role	Language	Channel	Ref.
2012	Gumrah: End of Innocence	Unknown	Hindi	Channel V India	
2013	Pavitra Rishta	Ruchita Karanjkar	Hindi	Zee TV	
2013	Crazy Stupid Ishq	Meenal Kashyap	Hindi	Channel V India	
2013–2014	Iss Pyaar Ko Kya Naam Doon? Ek Baar Phir	Swati	Hindi	Star Plus	
2014–2015	Friends: Conditions Apply	Shakti Rai	Hindi	Channel V India	
2015	Hum Aapke Ghar Mein Rehte Hain	Shakti Gupta	Hindi	Sony SAB	
2016	Kasam Tere Pyaar Ki	Tanuja Sikand	Hindi	Colors TV	
2017	Iss Pyaar Ko Kya Naam Doon 3	Chandni Narayan Vashishth	Hindi	Star Plus	
2017–2018	Vani Rani	Unknown	Hindi	&TV	
2018	Mitegi Laxman Rekha	Kanchan	Hindi	Zee Entertainment Enterprises	
2021	Agni Vayu	Dr. Agni Awasthi	Hindi	Ishara TV	
2022–2023	Nethra	Nethra	Telugu	Gemini TV	

=== Web series ===
Year	Title	Role	Notes	Ref.
2022	Mr Aur Mrs LLB	Payal Agarwal		

=== Music video appearances ===
Year	Title	Singer(s)	Ref.
2018	"More Saiyaan"	Sanjay Upadhyay, Vaibhav Saxena, Gunjan Jha	
