= Thodi Thodi Si Manmaaniyan =

Thodi Thodi si Manmaniyan
- Theatrical release poster
- Directed by: Aditya Sarpotdar
- Screenplay by: Ajinkya Kishore; Param Kalra; Amjad Khan Dialogue: Ajinkya Kishore
- Story by: Param Karla Amjad Khan Legal Advisors = RB& Associates Rohit Beaspal
- Produced by: Satish Kumar; Rohandeep singh
- Starring: Shrenu Parikh; Arsh Sehrawat; Shilpa Tulaskar; Mukesh Tiwari; Rahul Raj Malhotra; Kuldeep Sarin
- Cinematography: Milind Jog
- Edited by: Faisal Mahadik
- Music by: Troy Arif; Ajay Vas
- Production companies: NH 8 Production; Jumping Tomato Marketing Pvt Ltd
- Release date: 26 May 2017
- Country: India
- Language: Hindi

Thodi Thodi si Manmaaniyan (transl. A slight whimsicality) is a Hindi film starring Shrenu Parikh, Arsh Sehrawat, and Mukesh Tiwari. It was directed by Aditya Sarpotdar and written by Param Kalra and Amjad Khan.

== Cast ==
- Arsh Sehrawat as Siddharth Kaul
- Shrenu Parikh as Neha Datta
- Shilpa Tulaskar as Saroj Deep Kaul
- Mukesh Tiwari as Ajay Kaul
- Rahul Raj Malhotra as Sufi
- Kuldeep Sarin as Ram Sharan Jha
- Pratik Gandhi

== Plot ==
Siddharth Kaul, a young boy, is brought up by his single mother with dreams of settling abroad. Being a part of the rock band "Antriksha," Siddharth participates in a contest which changes his life completely. Not only that, he meets Neha Datta, a folk singer and social activist, and gets smitten by her ideologies. In the midst of all this, he comes face to face with his father's death. A short part of the shooting was done in Jaurasi village of Tauru town, Haryana.

Will Siddharth be able to come across the truth? Will he realize his passion, discover himself, or will his mother convince him to let go of his past?

== Soundtrack ==
Thodi Thodi Si Manmaaniyan

Soundtrack album by Ajay Vas Troy Arif
- Recorded: 2017
- Genre: Feature film soundtrack
- Label: Zee Music
- Producer: Satish Kumar

Troy Arif and Ajay Vas are the music composers while Raghav Dutt and Prerna Sahetia are the lyricists. The first track in the album Meherbaan has been sung by Shekhar Ravjiani and Shalmali Kholgade. Tu Bas Chal Yahan has a fusion feel and Nikhil D’souza and Prerna Sahetia performed this song. The title track is sung by Nikhil D’souza. Banjarey and Taarashta Main have voices by Yasser Desai and Siddharth Basrur respectively.

No.	Title	Lyrics	Music	Singer(s)	Length
1.	"Mehebraan"	Raghav Dutt	Troy Arif	Shekhar Ravjiani, Shalmali Kholgade	4:05
2.	"Tu Bas chal Yahan"	Prerna Sahetia	Ajay Vas	Nikhil D'Souza, Prerna Sahetia	3:58
3.	"Thodi Thodi Si Manmaaniyan"	Prerna Sahetia	Ajay Vas	Nikhil D'Souza	3:28
4.	"Banjarey"	Raghav Dutt	Troy Arif	Yasser Desai	5:16
5.	"Taarashta Main"	Prerna Sahetia	Ajay Vas	Siddharth Basrur	3:36
Total length:					19:43

== Accolades ==
Award Ceremony	Category	Recipient	Result	Ref.(s)
10th Mirchi Music Awards	Upcoming Music Composer of The Year	Troy Arif for "Meherbaan"	Nominated	
10th Mirchi Music Awards	Upcoming Lyricist of The Year	Raghav Dutt - "Meherbaan"	Nominated	
