= Iss Pyaar Ko Kya Naam Doon 3 =

- Genre: Drama
- Created by: Gul Khan
- Written by: Aayush Agrawal
- Creative director: Gorky M
- Starring: Barun Sobti; Shivani Tomar
- Opening theme: "Rabba Ve" by Amit Mishra
- Country of origin: India
- Original language: Hindi
- No. of seasons: 1
- No. of episodes: 70

Production
- Executive producer: Aayush Agrawal
- Producer: Gul Khan
- Camera setup: Multi-camera
- Running time: 21 minutes
- Production company: 4 Lions Films

Original release
- Network: StarPlus
- Release: 3 July – 6 October 2017

Related
- Iss Pyaar Ko Kya Naam Doon? Ek Baar Phir; Iss Pyaar Ko Kya Naam Doon?

Iss Pyaar Ko Kya Naam Doon? 3 (transl. What Shall We Name This Love? 3) is an Indian drama television series that aired on StarPlus from 3 July 2017 to 6 October 2017. Produced by Gul Khan under 4 Lions Films, it starred Barun Sobti and Shivani Tomar. The story is set in Allahabad and Mumbai. It is the third installment of the Iss Pyaar Ko Kya Naam Doon? series.

== Plot ==
Dev and Chandni are childhood best friends, hailing from Allahabad. Dev's father is the Mahant (chief priest) of a temple known for its hidden treasure. Dev's father is arrested for stealing the idol's jewellery and his wife is accused of being a witch. They are killed by a mysterious person after which Chandni's father Yash Narayana Vashisht becomes the Mahant. Dev escapes with his younger brother Meeku, but Chandni, unaware of her mother Indrani's plans to kill him, reveals their secret playing place where Dev is hiding. They find him there but he manages to escape with Meeku. While travelling by train, he is forced to throw his brother out to save him from a mob.

=== 16 years later ===
Dev has returned to Allahabad disguised as Advay Singh Raizada. Holding Chandni and her family responsible for what his family had to go through and his separation from his brother, he plans to take revenge. He charms the Vashishts, emerging as a saviour through various of his own set-ups, with the help of Murli, his assistant, and Shilpa, the Vashishts' servant who secretly works for Advay, and starts living with them. He buys the house the Vashishts are living in and lets them stay there.

Meanwhile, Chandni's wedding is fixed to Pratham a.k.a "PP", a sleazy man whom Indrani sets up Chandni with because his family is going to pay off Indrani's debt. Advay rescues Chandni from her fiance's problematic behaviour on several occasions but not without insulting her each time. Chandni and Advay engage in banter, trying to one up the other, but Chandni remains confused about why he hates her so much. He further disrupts her wedding and forcibly marries her by blackmailing her that he will reveal the truth of her illegitimate child who currently stays in an orphanage. Chandni agrees to save the respect of her family but doesn't tell Advay that the child is actually her sister Megha's.

Advay exposes this anyway at their reception party in order to spoil the Vashisht family's reputation. He throws them out of the house but his nani sides with Chandni and shelters her. She believes in Chandni's innocence and asks her never to leave Advay no matter what happens. Advay and Chandni shift to Mumbai where his maasi, Leela, his cousin sister Pooja and his nephew Adi reside. Advay loves Adi dearly. Chandni sees Advay's softer side emerge when he is with Adi. One day, during a fight with Chandni, Advay faints. Chandni takes him to the hospital and finds out that Advay donated his kidney to Adi in the past. She wonders about how different he is towards her compared to Adi. Eventually, the truth finally comes before Chandni who finds out Advay is her long lost childhood friend Dev whom she realizes she is now in love with. She attempts to reconcile with him but he pushes her away, still misunderstanding her and refusing to believe her side of the story. Advay's girlfriend Sasha comes to visit and hatches plans to ruin Chandni's attempts to be with Dev. In a turn of events, Dev discovers that Chandni has been innocent all along. Chandni finds out that Indrani is the real culprit and has her arrested. She seeks out Meeku, reuniting him with Dev, and decides to leave Dev's life forever, but he stops her. They embrace and reunite. Meeku falls in love with Chandni's sister Shikha and the family plans to get them married.

== Cast ==
=== Main ===
- Barun Sobti as Advay Singh Raizada / Dev Kashyap
- Shivani Tomar as Chandni Narayan Vashishth: Dev's childhood friend: Indrani's eldest daughter;
- Ritu Shivpuri as Indrani Narayan Vashishth, main antagonist

=== Recurring ===
- Tarun Anand as Yash Narayan Vashishth, Indrani's husband, Chandni's father, the deputy Mahant
- Ketaki Kadam as Shikha Narayan Vashisht: Indrani's younger daughter
- Shagun Sharma as Meghna Narayan Vashisht: Indrani's elder daughter
- Sameer Dharmadhikari as Mahant, Advay & Meeku's father, chief priest of a fictitious Shiv temple in Allahabad
- Mitali Nag as Mahantini: Advay's mother; She was believed to be a Chudail
- Randeep Malik as Rajveer Singh Raizada / Meeku, Advay's younger brother
- Seema Azmi as Kajal, Indrani's sister
- Jaswant Menaria as Rajit, Kajal's husband
- Salina Prakash as Shakun, Indrani's sister
- Juhi Aslam as Shilpa, Advay's assistant and spy, servant of Raizada house
- Sanjay Choudhary as Murli, Advay's assistant and spy, servant of Raizada house
- Rishika Mihani as Pooja Raizada, Advay's cousin sister
- Ritu Chaudhary as Leela Raizada: Pooja's mother
- Kabir Altaf Shah as Aditya, Pooja's son
- Smriti Khanna as Sasha, Advay's girlfriend
- Pearl V Puri as Sushant, Advay's friend

=== Guest stars ===
- Nakuul Mehta as Shivaay Singh Oberoi from Ishqbaaz, Advay's close friend
- Reyhna Malhotra as Svetlana Kapoor from Ishqbaaz, Sasha's friend
- Badshah as himself, a special appearance for Advay and Chandini's wedding ceremony
- Mika Singh as himself

== Production ==
The show opened to above average TRPs. Owing to TRP pressure, the inconsistently changing content did not appeal to viewers. It did not reach adequate ratings and Star Plus ended the show after completing 70 episodes.
