= Lamboo Rastoo =

- Theatrical release poster
- Directed by: Mihir Bhuta
- Written by: Mihir Bhuta
- Produced by: Rajat K Chaudhari
- Starring: Jay Soni; Shrenu Parikh; Maulik Pathak; Manoj Joshi; Anang Desai
- Production company: RKC Motion Pictures
- Distributed by: Panorama Studios
- Release date: 7 September 2018
- Running time: 123 minutes
- Country: India
- Language: Gujarati

Lamboo Rastoo is a 2018 Gujarati musical drama film starring veteran Gujarati actress Shrenu Parikh and Jay Soni in the lead role, with Manoj Joshi, Anang Desai, and Maulik Pathak. The film is directed by Mihir Bhuta for RKC Motion Pictures.

== Plot ==
Dhaivat, an ambitious musician, aspires to present a symphony that he created for his daughter at a symphony competition. However, the organizer of the competition, Param, doesn't want him to participate in the competition and kidnaps Dhaivat's daughter to stop him.

== Cast ==
- Jay Soni as Dhaivat Yagnik
- Shrenu Parikh as Shruti Yagnik
- Manoj Joshi as Dilip Mahajan
- Anang Desai as Shiv Hari Yagnik
- Maulik Pathak as Param Agrawal
- Archan Trivedi as Nayak Kaka
- Aditiben Desai as Sadhana Mahajan
- Jaanushi Oza as Clara
- Shraddha Dangar as Ragini
- Rahul Raval as Shrenik Mahajan
- Divya Thakkar as Mansi Mahajan
- Chintan Pandya as Sanjay
- Pradhuman Sinh Solanki as Parag
- Harsh Soni as Siddharth
- Bhargav Joshi as Shruti's Boss
- Sharik Khan as Rahul

== Reception ==
In its review of Lamboo Rostoo The Times of India gave a rating of 3.5 stars from five, and concluded: ... "In the end, one feels that better editing in the second half would have led to a better end result. The excellent climax, however, leaves you pleasantly surprised and this one gets an extra star because of the innovative climax and earnest performances."
