= Maitree (TV series) =

Indian drama television series

- Created by: Jitendra Gupta
- Story by: Jitendra Gupta
- Directed by: khalid Akhtar
- Starring: Shrenu Parikh; Bhaweeka Chaudhary; Namish Taneja
- Country of origin: India
- Original language: Hindi
- No. of seasons: 1
- No. of episodes: 225

Production
- Producer: Jitendra Gupta (Co producer)
- Camera setup: Multi-camera
- Running time: 20–25 minutes

Original release
- Network: Zee TV; ZEE5
- Release: 7 February – 17 September 2023

Maitree is an Indian television series that premiered on 7 February 2023 on Zee TV. Produced under Sunshine Productions, it stars Shrenu Parikh, Bhaweeka Chaudhary, and Namish Taneja.

== Plot ==
Maitree and Nandini are best friends and, to avoid being separated from each other, hope to marry into the same house.

Nandini and Maitree are now grown up. Nandini is married to Aashish. They are also expecting their first child. Aashish is an advocate by profession. Eventually, Maitree marries Saransh, Aashish's younger cousin. Unknown to anyone, Saransh is a drug addict. Saransh and Maitree; Nandini and Aashish get into a car accident. Aashish and Maitree luckily survive the accident. Nandini falls into a coma after delivering a baby boy while Saransh succumbs to his injuries and dies. Saransh's mother, Sona Tiwari blames Maitree for Saransh's death. Nandini's mother, Advocate Vasundhara Singh Rathore accidentally mentions in front of Aashish that Saransh was a drug addict, which shocks him. Maitree decides to take care of Nandini and Aashish's son. Vasundhara informs Maitree that Saransh was a drug addict. Maitree is devastated and confronts Aashish. Aashish tries to conceal the truth but fails as Vasundhara has sent Saransh's reports to Maitree.

Aashish gets arrested and Vasundhara uses false evidence in court against him to prove that he is a drug dealer. But later, he gets bail and attends his son's naming ceremony. Aashish and Nandini's son is named Nandish ( a combination of their name). Maitree and Aashish decide to raise Nandish.

Nandini comes out of a coma and tries to bond with Nandish, who doesn't want to get rid of Maitree. As a result, Nandini turns against Maitree and starts to think that she is snatching Nandish from her. She tries to create difficulties in Maitree's life and turns her enemy. After a series of events, Nandish accepts Nandini as his mother but continues to refer to Maitree as "maa" (mother). For Nandini's happiness, Maitree leaves the Tiwari Mansion. She meets a fun-loving man, Harsh, and marries him. Later, it's revealed that Harsh is Saransh's half-brother from his father's side. Both Maitree and Harsh move into the Tiwari Mansion again. Harsh's mother, Kamna, tries to torture and kill Maitree but is exposed. Aashish dies, in an attempt to save Nandini from a fire. Saransh who is alive turns furious when he discovers that Maitree has remarried. He returns and pretends to be Aashish, to seek revenge on Maitree.

Maitree gets pregnant and gives birth to a boy child. Saransh steals the child and misinforms the family that he has murdered him. Harsh blames Maitree for the possible death of their son and throws her out of the Tiwari house. Saransh hands Maitree's child to a greedy woman, who leaves the child in the trash. Maitree finds her child and decides to raise him, but she is unaware that it's her biological child.

Maitree lives with her son, Swayam. On the other hand, Harsh still blames Maitree for their son's death and has adopted a girl, Juhi. For the sake of the family, Harsh and Nandini get married. Maitree eventually got engaged to her boss, Yash. Saransh comes back and tells Maitree and Harsh that Swayam is their son. However, due to Swayam's illness, the doctor tells Harsh and Maitree that they have to produce Swayam's sibling who will donate bone marrow to Swayam. Maitree and Harsh reconcile to save Swayam's life. Maitree breaks her engagement with Yash and Nandini breaks her marriage with Harsh. Nandini gradually realizes she committed a grave mistake by breaking her marriage with Harsh to save Swayam's life. She turns revengeful and joins hands with Saransh to kill Maitree. Sona learns about Nandini and Saransh's plan to kill Maitree. As Sona calls Maitree to expose Nandini and Saransh, Nandini pushes her from the terrace, and she dies.

== Cast ==
=== Main ===
- Shrenu Parikh as Maitree Tiwari (nee Mishra): Dinesh and Sadhna's daughter (2023)
  - Zara Khan as Child Maitree Mishra (2023)
- Bhaweeka Chaudhary as Nandini Tiwari (nee Singh Rathore): Vasundhara's daughter (2023)
  - Urvi Upadhyay as Child Nandini Singh Rathore (2023)

=== Recurring ===
- Samarth Jurel as Harsh Tiwari: Madan and Kamna's son (2023)
- Namish Taneja as Advocate Aashish Tiwari: Omprakash and Kusum's son (2023)
- Saksham Shringirushi as Nandish Tiwari: Aashish and Nandini's son (2023)
  - Gantavya Sharma as Child Nandish Tiwari (2023)
  - Azima Shaikh as Baby Nandish Tiwari (2023)
- Zaan Khan / Kunal Karan Kapoor as Saransh Tiwari: Sona and Madan's son (2023)
- Ishita Ganguly as Swarnmani: An Ichchadhari Naagin; Rani's daughter (2023)
- Aadesh Chaudhary as Yash Thakur: Maitree's boss and ex-fiancée (2023)
- Ananya Khare as Sona Tiwari: Madan's late wife (2023)
- Manish Khanna as Madan Tiwari: Sona's widower (2023)
- Maleeka Ghai as Kamna Tiwari: Madan's second wife (2023)
- Khalida Jan as Advocate Vasundhara Singh Rathore: Nandini's mother (2023)
- Ranav Sharma as Swayam Tiwari: Harsh and Maitree's son Vedika's brother (2023)
- Trisha Bisht as Juhi Tiwari: Harsh's adopted daughter (2023)
- Amit Kapoor as DSP Dinesh Mishra: Sadhna's husband (2023)
- Vijaylaxmi Singh as Sadhna Mishra: Dinesh's wife (2023)
- Chirag Kapoor as Sachin Mishra: Sadhna and Dinesh's son (2023)
- Diksha Tiwari as Princey Mishra (née Singh Rathore): Neelu and Chakramani's daughter (2023)
- Pratish Vora as Omprakash Tiwari: Aashish's father; Madan's brother (2023)
- Sunny Saini as Kabootar: A Drugs Peddler (2023)
- Naman Arora as Rajkumar: Nandini's cousin (2023)
- Govind Khatri as Chakramani: Vasundhara's brother (2023)
- Smita Kalpavriksha Gupta as Kusum Omprakash Tiwari: Omprakash's wife (2023)
- Sangeeta Adhikari as Neelu Singh: Princey and Rajkumar's mother (2023)
- Maitree's sister–in–law; Sachin's wife (2023)
- Sapan Chaudhary as Vivek Oberoi (2023)
- Vishal Kotian as Bajrangi: An autorickshaw driver (2023)
- Ram Awana as Trikaal: A tantik (2023)
- Hemant Choudhary as Nageshwar: A Shiv Bhakt (2023)
- Shweta Dadhich as Rani: An Ichchadhari Naagin; Swarnmani's mother (2023)

== Production ==
The series was announced on Zee TV in 2023. Shrenu Parikh, Bhaweeka Chaudhary, Zaan Khan, and Namish Taneja were signed as the lead. The launch event for the series was held on 4 February 2023.

== See also ==
- List of programmes broadcast by Zee TV
