= Kyun Utthe Dil Chhod Aaye =

Indian television series

- Genre: Drama
- Created by: Sumeet Hukamchand Mittal; Shashi Mittal
- Screenplay by: S. Manasvi
- Story by: Shashi Mittal; Pankhuri Gangwal
- Directed by: Vikram V Labhe; Yogesh Bijendra Bhati
- Starring: See below
- Music by: Anand Shandilya and Surendra Singh
- Opening theme: Kyun Utthe Dil Chhod Aaye
- Country of origin: India
- Original language: Hindi
- No. of episodes: 150

Production
- Producers: Sumeet Mittal; Shashi Mittal; Jitendra Singhla
- Production locations: Mumbai; Amritsar; Gujarat
- Running time: 21-49 minutes
- Production company: Shashi Sumeet Productions Pvt. Ltd.

Original release
- Network: Sony Entertainment Television
- Release: 25 January – 20 August 2021

Kyun Uthhe Dil Chhod Aaye (transl. Why did you leave your heart there?) is an Indian Hindi-language period drama television series. Produced by Shashi Sumeet Productions, it premeried from 25 January 2021 to 20 August 2021 on Sony TV and is digitally available on Sony LIV. The series starred Gracy Goswami, Anchal Sahu, Pranali Rathod, Zaan Khan, Shagun Pandey, Yash Tonk and Kunal Jaisingh.

== Plot ==
In 1946, Amrit Sahani and Vashma Baig are two best friends in Lahore. Both Sahani and Baig are like families for, despite being from different religions they are the best friends. While Vashma has a close friendship with Amrit's cousin, Uday, who always supports Amrit and Vashma, Amrit is yet to meet her love. Randhir Raizada owns a newspaper and press and publishes stories by 'Ranjhan'. Amrit is a secret writer with the pen name 'Ranjhan', which only Vashma is aware of. Ranjhan and Randhir write each other letters. Soon, they have a chance meeting and Randhir gets attracted to Ranjhan, who is in disguise. As Sahani family has negative views about Ranjhan, Amrit hides her writing. Uday, who is a hockey player, has a strained relationship with his father, Brij. Vashma supports Uday in his passion for hockey.

Brij marries a banjaran Radha, who is young like Uday. Randhir comes to Sahanis' and finds that Amrit is Ranjhan. Randhir's marriage is fixed with Amrit's cousin, Kiran. Both Amrit and Randhir are shocked as they have started to like each other. Uday gets into the National hockey team with Vashma's help. Eventually, Amrit-Randhir and Vashma-Uday fall in love. Kiran's mother, Mogar tries to ruin their relationship, but in vain. After some drama, Amrit's father, Ratan unwillingly fixes Amrit and Randhir's marriage.

Vashma's marriage is fixed with Farooq. Vashma and Uday's relationship is exposed and Vashma is forced to marry Farroq. Randhir saves Amrit and Mogar from a fire accident, after which Ratan accepts Randhir. Amrit finds that Vashma is pregnant with Uday's child while Farooq is desperate to know about Vashma's lover.

On 15 August 1947, Randhir and Amrit's wedding have started. Farooq finds that Uday is Vashma's lover and instigates Vashma's brother, Abrar about the Sahanis' being Hindu and during the partition, they plan to kill them. Partition is announced and violence has started. Abrar and Farooq lead the violent troop. Amrit and Randheer's marriage is halted and Vashma's mother, Zahida lies Abrar and helps Sahanis'. Ratan and Rajrani are killed in the riots, leaving Amrit heartbroken. Randhir's parents give him his childhood photo before escaping. Amrit-Randhir, Uday-Vashma, and Brij-Radha manage to escape but are caught by Farooq, who tattoos his name on Amrit's hand. Vashma gives birth to a son, Kabir. Abrar realizes his mistakes and helps Randhir and Uday to save others. Farooq is killed by Vashma and Amrit falls into a coma. Brij is killed by Farooq after Farooq finds out that he is hiding at Iqbal's house.

After some days, Amrit recovers, and the violence in Lahore has ended. They decide to move to another city. On their way to the borderline, Randhir goes with Vashma to find Kabir, separating from others. They find him but are caught by the police. Randhir gets himself arrested to save Vashma and Kabir, while Amrit, Uday, and Radha are moved to another city.

=== 4 years later ===
In 1951, Amrit lives in Delhi with Mogar, who has now reformed. She faces taunts due to her tattoo and awaits Randhir and Vashma. Vashma works in a brothel and is desperate to find her son Kabir while Uday gets selected for an Indian hockey team. Vashma and Uday are not known to each other. Randhir releases from jail and is determined to find Amrit. Amrit's marriage is fixed with Veer Pratap Singh, who is the son of Prime Minister, Nalini Pratap Singh. Veer is blamed for his brother, Prem's death. On the wedding day, Amrit is kidnapped and meets Vashma at a brothel. Vashma reveals to Amrit what happened to Randhir and how she ended up at a brothel after Kabir is stolen.

Amrit is married to Veer. Soon, she meets Randhir, who is heartbroken learning about her marriage. Uday reunites with Vashma and helps her to become a teacher, promising to find Kabir. Later, Randhir is revealed to be Nalini's long-lost son, Prem Pratap Singh after finding his childhood photo. Amrit finds out about this and tells Veer and Randhir that they are brothers. Veer finally realizes that Randhir and Amrit loves each other and decides to hand over Amrit to Randhir. It turns out that Vijendra was responsible for Randhir's accident when Randhir was a child and Veer's addiction to alcohol. He also has a son Naman who is trying to kill Veer. Vijendra and Naman try to kill Randhir after knowing that he is Veer's biological brother. They both again try to kill Randhir in a bomb blast but instead Veer is killed in the blast. Everybody grieves for his death.

Randhir and his family move back to their old house as Nalini does not want to stay where Veer was killed. Vashma soon finds out that Manak is actually Kabir who was lost from the past 4 years. Vashma after finding this out, gets injured and falls into coma so therefore Uday does not know about this. Vijendra is soon exposed and sent to jail for Veer's death. Nalini forgives Kaveri and moves on. Randhir and Amrit soon give birth to a girl. Randhir now runs a successful newspaper and Amrit has become a renowned writer. Vashma recovers and hands Manak over to Mohan and Bindu. Vashma and Uday are soon blessed with a girl. Uday becomes the captain of Indian hockey team, while Vashma opens her dance school. Amrit and Vashma finally celebrate their Independence, like they always wanted to since their days in Lahore.

== Cast ==
=== Main ===
- Gracy Goswami as Amrit "Amru/Ranjhan" Singh (née Sahani) – A famous writer; Ratan and Rajrani's daughter; Bhanu's sister; Uday and Kiran's cousin; Vashma's best friend; Veer's widow; Randhir's wife
- Anchal Sahu as Vashma "Vashmu" Sahani (née Baig) – Iqbal and Zahida's daughter; Abrar's sister; Amrit's best friend; Farooq's ex-wife; Uday's wife; Kabir's mother
- Pranali Rathod as Radha Sahani – A Banjaran; Brij's widow; Uday's step-mother; Kabir's step-grandmother
- Zaan Khan as Prem Pratap Singh /Randhir Raizada – Newspaper editor and press owner; Nalini and Gajendra's younger son; Karamchand and Savita's adopted son; Vijayendra's step-son; Veer's brother; Amrit's second husband
- Shagun Pandey as Uday Sahani – Hockey player; Brij and Kaushalya's son; Radha's step-son; Bhanu, Amrit and Kiran's cousin; Vashma's second husband; Kabir's father
- Yash Tonk as Brij Sahani – Ratan and Mogar's brother; Kaushalya's widower; Radha's husband; Uday's father; Kabir's grandfather
- Kunal Jaisingh as Veer Pratap Singh – Nalini and Gajendra's elder son; Vijayendra's step-son; Randhir's brother; Amrit's first husband

=== Recurring ===
- Avtar Gill as Ratan Kishore Sahani – Brij and Mogar's brother; Rajrani's husband; Bhanu and Amrit's father; Babli's grandfather; Iqbal's best friend
- Geeta Tyagi as Rajrani Sahani – Ratan's wife; Bhanu and Amrit's mother; Babli's grandmother; Zahida's friend
- Kanika Maheshwari as Mogar Sahani – Ratan and Brij's sister; Kiranbala's mother
- Aishani Yadav as Kiranbala "Kiran" Sahani – Mogar's daughter; Bhanu, Uday and Amrit's cousin
- Hitesh Makhija as Bhanu Sahani – Ratan and Rajrani's son; Amrit's brother; Uday and Kiranbala's cousin; Saroj's husband; Babli's father
- Yashashri Masurkar as Saroj Sahani – Bhanu's wife; Babli's mother
- Hetvi Sharma as Babli Sahani – Bhanu and Saroj's daughter; Kabir's cousin
- Nasir Khan as Dr. Iqbal Baig – Zahida's husband, Abrar and Vashma's father; Ratan's best friend
- Vaishnavi Mahant as Zahida Baig – Iqbal's wife; Abrar and Vashma's mother; Kabir's grandmother; Rajrani's friend
- Jitendra Bohara as Abrar Baig – Iqbal and Zahida's son; Vashma's brother
- Ashish Kaul as Karamchand Raizada – Savita's widower; Randhir's adoptive father
- Raymon Kakar as Savita Raizada – Karamchand's wife; Randhir's adoptive mother
- Geetanjali Tikekar as Nalini "Rani Maa" Pratap Singh – Gajendra's widow; Vijendra's ex-wife; Veer and Randhir's mother
- Gurdeep Kohli as Kaveri Pratap Singh – Gajendra and Mohan's sister; Vijendra's ex-lover; Naman's mother
- Harsh Singh as Vijendra Pratap Singh – Nalini's second husband; Kaveri's lover; Naman's father; Veer and Randhir's step-father
- Afzaal Khan as Mohan Pratap Singh – Gajendra and Kaveri's brother; Bindu's husband; Kabir's adoptive father
- Shweta Sinha as Bindu Pratap Singh – Mohan's wife; Kabir's adoptive mother
- Akshan Sherawat as Kabir Sahni / Manak Pratap Singh – Vashma and Uday's son; Bindu and Mohan's adopted son; Babli's cousin
- Gaurav Sharma as Farooq Ansari – Vashma's ex-husband; Abrar's friend
- Sandeep Goyal as Sharfu – Randhir's friend and assistant
- Nidhi Tiwari as Zara – House-help at Sahani Household
- Charu Asopa as Zohra Bai – A tawaif

== Production ==
=== Development ===
Kyun Utthe Dil Chhod Aaye is produced by Shashi Sumeet Productions. It is based in the pre-partition era. The makers of the show hired a special dialect coach to train the lead actors to speak fluently in Punjabi and pronounce the Urdu Laheza correctly.

=== Casting ===
Gracy Goswami was cast to portray Amrit, a writer opposite Khan, while Anchal Sahu was cast to play Vashma, a dancer opposite Pandey. Pranali Rathod was cast to portray Radha, a banjaran opposite Tonk.

Zaan Khan was cast as Randhir, a newspaper editor opposite Goswami. Shagun Pandey was cast as a hockey player, Uday opposite Sahu. Yash Tonk was cast a Brij opposite the much younger Rathod.

Kanika Maheshwari was cast as the negative lead, Mogar. Charu Asopa was roped in to play a cameo role of a brothel lady. In March 2021, Avtar Gill, Geeta Tyagi, Yash Tonk, and Pranali Rathod playing Ratan Sahani, Rajrani Sahani, Brij Sahani, and Radha Sahani left the show before the leap.

In March 2021, Kunal Jaisingh was cast in a grey shade opposite Gracy Goswami's character. In June 2021, Kunal Jaisingh left the show after his character died in a bomb blast.

=== Filming ===
The series is set in Lahore. It is mainly shot at the Film City, Mumbai. Some initial sequences were shot in Amritsar. The cast and crew of the show also visited the Golden Temple before the release of the show.

On 13 April 2021, Uddhav Thackeray, then Chief Minister of Maharashtra announced a sudden curfew due to increased Covid cases, while the production halted in Mumbai from 14 April 2021.

The production location was soon shifted temporarily to Surendranagar, Gujarat. The team shot at the Ambika Niwas Palace. After two months of shooting in Gujarat, the team shifted back to Film City, Mumbai on 20 June 2021.

=== Release ===
Kyun Utthe Dil Chhod Aaye premiered from 25 January 2021 to 20 August 2021 on Sony Entertainment Television.

=== Cancellation ===
The series went off-air on 20 August 2021 due to low viewership.

== Reception ==
=== Critical reception ===
Kyun Utthe Dil Chhod Aaye received mostly mixed to positive reviews. It received praises for its story, cinematography, performance of the cast and music. Critics pointed that the narrative is simple but the language is heavy for the audiences to understand.

=== Ratings ===
The series had a TRP of 0.5 in its opening week. While initially it maintained a good rating, gradually the ratings declined in the later months.

The series had good ratings in the UK. On its first day, it was watched by 15.5 K viewers, while on its second day it was watched by 24.2 K viewers. In March 2021, it was one of the most watched show with 19.6 K viewers on 1 March and 32.2 K viewers on 3 March.

== Soundtrack ==
Kyun Utthe Dil Chhod Aaye Original Sound Track

Soundtrack album by Uttam Singh
- Released: 25 January 2021
- Genre: Romance; Soundtrack
- Length: 14:17
- Language: Hindi
- Label: Sony Entertainment
- Producer: Shashi Sumeet Productions

Kyun Utthe Dil Chhod Aaye's soundtrack has been composed by Uttam Singh, lyrics are penned by Dev Kohli. All the songs have been sung by Javed Ali and Bela Shende.

Kyun Utthe Dil Chhod Aaye
No.	Title	Singer(s)	Length
1.	"Kyun Utthe Dil Chhod Aaye(title track)"	Javed Ali, Bela Shende	04:13
2.	"Kyun Utthe Dil Chhod Aaye(female version)"	Bela Shende	04:13
3.	"Kyun Utthe Dil Chhod Aaye(male version)"	Javed Ali	04:13
4.	"Gazab Ki Thi Wo Lali(female version)"	Bela Shende	00:58
5.	"Gazab Ki Thi Wo Lali(male version)"	Javed Ali	00:58
6.	"Kahaan Ye Khel Seekha(female version)"	Bela Shende	00:58
7.	"Kahaan Ye Khel Seskha(male version)"	Javed Ali	00:58
Total length:			05:11

== See also ==
- List of programs broadcast by Sony Entertainment Television
