= Shalmalee Desai =

Indian television writer and actress

- Born: Mumbai, India
- Education: Bachelor of Arts (psychology); Master of Business Administration (marketing)
- Occupations: Actress; television writer
- Years active: 2012–2017
- Spouse: Avinash Sachdev (m. 2015; div. 2017)

Shalmalee Desai (born 17 March 1989) is an Indian television writer and actress mainly known for the role of Sojal in the Hindi television show Iss Pyaar Ko Kya Naam Doon? Ek Baar Phir. She was the winner of the UTV Stars reality show Lux The Chosen One in 2012.

== Early life and career ==
Born and brought up in Mumbai, Shalmalee worked with television channel Zee Marathi as a management trainee after completing an MBA from Welingkar College in 2011. Shalmalee is a trained Kathak dancer as well as a golfer.

After winning in the reality show Lux The Chosen One in 2012, she became the official face of UTV Stars channel for the year 2013. The same year, she secured her first television role in the television show Iss Pyaar Ko Kya Naam Doon? Ek Baar Phir. After completing a screenwriting course at Whistling Woods International Institute, she made her writing debut with popular television drama series Thapki Pyar Ki in 2016.

== Personal life ==
In 2015, Desai married her Iss Pyaar Ko Kya Naam Doon? Ek Baar Phir co-star Avinash Sachdev. The couple divorced in 2017.

== Television work ==
=== Actor ===
Year	Show	Role	Notes
2012	Lux The Chosen One	Contestant / Winner	Won
2013	Just Khans	Host	
2013–2015	Iss Pyaar Ko Kya Naam Doon? Ek Baar Phir	Sojal Agnihotri	Supporting role
2014	Ek Hasina Thi	Sagarika Ganguli	Cameo
2014	Encounter	Mrs. Dave	Supporting role
2015	Gulmohar Grand	Avanti	Episodic role

=== Writer ===
Year	Show	Channel	Ref(s)
2016–2017	Thapki Pyar Ki	Colors TV	
2017	Ek Aastha Aisi Bhee	Star Plus	
