= Iss Pyaar Ko Kya Naam Doon? Ek Baar Phir =

Indian romantic drama television series

- Genre: Romance; Drama
- Created by: Sunjoy Waddhwa
- Directed by: Waseem Sabir; Yusuf Ansari
- Starring: Avinash Sachdev; Shrenu Parikh
- Theme music composer: Shaurabh Kalsi; Nupur Pant
- Country of origin: India
- Original language: Hindi
- No. of seasons: 3
- No. of episodes: 542

Production
- Executive producer: Karnika Saxena
- Producer: Sunjoy Waddhwa
- Cinematography: Hanif Shaikh
- Camera setup: Multi-camera
- Running time: 20–23 minutes
- Production company: Sphere Origins

Original release
- Network: StarPlus
- Release: 26 August 2013 – 13 June 2015

Related
- Iss Pyaar Ko Kya Naam Doon?; Iss Pyaar Ko Kya Naam Doon 3

Iss Pyaar Ko Kya Naam Doon? Ek Baar Phir (transl. What Shall I Name This Love? Once Again) is an Indian romantic drama television series created and produced by Sunjoy Waddhwa under Sphere Origins. The series aired on StarPlus from 26 August 2013 to 13 June 2015, completing a total of 542 episodes. The show stars Avinash Sachdev and Shrenu Parikh as Shlok and Aastha, respectively. It is the second installment in the Iss Pyaar Ko Kya Naam Doon? series.

Set and filmed in Pune, Maharastra, the show revolves around Shlok Agnihotri and Aastha Kirloskar. It tells the story of Shlok, a cunning business executive struggling with a recent breakup, which shapes his chauvinistic personality and actions. Shlok becomes entangled in a world of chauvinistic beliefs and hatred for love. Aastha, a progressive and liberal girl committed to driving change and fostering equality, crosses paths with Shlok, who becomes increasingly irritated by her nature. Shlok pretends to love Aastha and marries her, driven by a desire for revenge who mistakenly holds her accountable for the reputational damage to him and his family. The show navigates the conflicts between revenge and the evolving emotions of love. The series also portrays domestic violence, addressing a common social issue.

The show’s co-stars include Manish Wadhwa and Geetanjali Tikekar as Shlok's parents, Niranjan Agnihotri and Anjali Agnihotri, and Tushar Dalvi and Prachi Shah as Aastha's parents, Avdhoot Kirloskar and Kalindi Kirloskar. The two families hold vastly different views on gender equality. Other notable characters include Aarav Chowdhary and Dolly Minhas as Indrajeet Sarkar and Ahilya Vinas, who, after settling in Pune, plan a deceptive plan to take over the Agnihotris' wealth.

Iss Pyaar Ko Kya Naam Doon? Ek Baar Phir was the first television series on StarPlus to be broadcast in a non-prime time slot at 6:00 PM (IST). The show garnered higher-than-expected viewership in its initial weeks, setting a trend for the new prime-time slot.

== Plot ==
Aastha is a cheerful, compassionate, and independent woman who strongly believes in equality and the importance of relationships. In contrast, Shlok Agnihotri is an arrogant, emotionally distant businessman who values wealth and reputation over human connections. His cold personality is shaped by a painful past.

Shlok, President and CEO of Agnihotri Educational Trust Inc, manages several educational institutions. When an incident of academic misconduct occurs, he suspends the male students involved but expels the female student. The Agnihotri family later attends an award ceremony celebrating their contribution to the education industry. At the event, Aastha publicly questions Shlok about his unfair treatment of the girl. The confrontation is broadcast live, damaging the Agnihotri family’s public image and resulting in a raid on their business.

Believing that Aastha deliberately insulted his family, Shlok decides to take revenge. He pretends to fall in love with her and marries her under false pretenses. On their wedding night, Shlok breaks Aastha’s mangalsutra and reveals that he never loved her, admitting that the marriage was part of his revenge plan. He threatens to have her father, Avdhoot, framed in a case corruption if she exposes the truth of their relationship.

Varad arranges a honeymoon for the couple in Singapore. Despite Aastha’s attempts to cancel the trip, they leave, during which Aastha escapes and gets lost in a jungle. Shlok finds her, and they spend their honeymoon in the jungle trying to find their way out. During this time, Aastha learns that her father has been arrested and believes Shlok is responsible. Shlok insists on his innocence, but Aastha reveals the truth about their marriage to both families. Kalindi advises her to seek divorce. At the first court hearing, the judge orders Aastha to stay with Shlok for six months before granting a decision.

During this period, Aastha gradually learns about Shlok’s past. She discovers that he was once in love with a woman named Swati, whose separation from him caused his deep hatred toward women. It is revealed that Niranjan ordered Anjali to oppose Swati because she was against the regressive Agnihotri family traditions. This led to Shlok’s heartbreak and emotional withdrawal from relationships. As Aastha tries to bring out Shlok’s true nature, she falls in love with him and later confesses her feelings.

Meanwhile, Aditi enters the Agnihotri house under a false identity to separate Shlok and Aastha. She makes multiple attempts to kill Aastha, but Shlok saves her each time. Aastha is kidnapped but Shlok finds her. Aditi reveals that she is Swati’s sister, and accuses Shlok for Swati’s failing health. Shlok later meets Swati shortly before her death, which deeply affects him. At the end of six months, Shlok and Aastha decide not to divorce. Realizing his love for Aastha, Shlok confesses his feelings, and they both consummate.

Jyoti flees her abusive in-laws after they plan to abort her unborn daughter for the third time. While escaping, she meets Siddharth, Aastha’s cousin, who unknowingly helps her. Siddharth sends her to Kalindi's house, and Jyoti explains everything to Kalindi. Meanwhile, Siddharth gradually falls in love with Jyoti. Abhay and Sulbha plan to convince the Agnihotri family that they are innocent and that Jyoti had simply run away.

Aastha discovers Niranjan’s true nature and witnesses his emotional abuse of Anjali. She learns how Niranjan deceives his family to maintain control. During Anjali's birthday celebration, Aastha confronts Anjali about their relationship, and both become emotional as Anjali finally admits that Niranjan has her helpless and unwillingly obeys Niranjan. Aastha promises to reveal Niranjan's true nature to the family. Abhay finds Jyoti, and exposes her in front of the family. Jyoti tells the truth about Abhay’s violent behaviour and requests Niranjan to allow her to stay with them. The police arrest Abhay. When Niranjan indirectly pressures Jyoti into signing the bail papers, Abhay insists on taking her home. Anjali intervenes infuriating Niranjan. However, Jyoti starts to see Anjali's kind nature. After initial resistance, the Agnihotri family eventually agree to Jyoti and Siddharth’s marriage.

Aastha attempts to inform Shlok about Niranjan’s manipulations, but he refuses to believe her, leading to misunderstandings in their relationship. Aastha manages to obtain evidence of Niranjan’s intentions, but accidentally presents a blank DVD to the family, further angering Shlok. Due to Aastha’s persistent accusations against Niranjan, Shlok divides the house and orders Aastha to stay separately. Anjali immediately joins her, openly confessing Niranjan’s control over her and how he deceives everyone, shocking the family. Soon after, Jyoti overhears Niranjan admitting his true intentions about Jyoti. Devastated, she sides with Anjali and Aastha and tells Shlok that he is being fooled. When Sojal learns of Varad’s affair and sees Niranjan dismiss her concerns, she also joins Anjali and Aastha.

Niranjan learns that Aastha has evidence against him and destroys it. He has Aastha kidnapped and nearly killed. Niranjan prevents Anjali from saving her and takes her away. Anjali criticises Niranjan, and Shlok rescues Aastha. Shlok finally learns the truth about Niranjan as he witnesses him confessing his past actions to Anjali. Shlok is heartbroken as he loses faith in his father. He regrets his past mistreatment of Anjali and his misunderstandings with Aastha. Shlok apologizes to Anjali for his past behavior and embraces her. Anjali is overjoyed to see Shlok's love for her, and they both become emotional. Shlok decides to leave his status and wealth, and leaves the Agnihotri house with Aastha and Anjali.

Shlok and Aastha start a modest life by operating a food truck business in Mumbai. Niranjan, feeling lonely, regrets his actions and is desperate to find Shlok. He eventually locates Shlok, Aastha and Anjali, asking for forgiveness, which they grant. Varad becomes brainwashed and foolishly signs an agreement with Indrajeet Sarkar, leading to the loss of the Agnihotri's assets. Varad also seeks forgiveness for his mistakes and is forgiven.

The reunited Agnihotri family live together in a small house. They plan to reclaim their assets from the Sarkars. Shlok and Aastha disguise themselves as Balvankar Singh and Sapna to regain their lost assets; Aastha works as Indrajeet’s assistant while Shlok takes care of his children. They successfully obtain the Power of Attorney documents, and reveal their true identities. On the day they recover everything, the Sarkars reveal a shocking truth that devastates Anjali and shocks the rest of the family. Shlok, Anjali and Aastha are involved in a deadly accident, in which Shlok falls into a coma, Anjali dies and Aastha loses her memory. After hearing the news, Niranjan becomes insane and admitted in a long-term care facility.

When Shlok wakes up from the coma six months later, he is devastated to learn that Anjali died in the accident. He asks about Aastha, and Varad informs him that she is missing since the accident. After a desperate search, Shlok finally finds Aastha, but she is unable to recognize him, leaving him heartbroken. It is revealed that Indrajeet has taken advantage of Aastha's memory loss, leading her to believe that he is her husband. Shlok begins to recreate past events, hoping that Aastha naturally remembers her past. As Aastha slowly starts to recall her past, Shlok manages to stop the wedding and rescues Aastha, who is delighted to see him. Indrajeet is arrested, and Shlok and Aastha adopt his children, living happily together.

== Cast ==
=== Main ===
- Avinash Sachdev as Shlok Agnihotri: Aastha's husband and the CEO of Agnihotri Educational Trust Inc. After a painful breakup, he becomes a troubled, chauvinistic business tycoon who often discourages and degrades women's achievements. As his character evolves, Shlok gains a fabricated reputation for opening educational institutions for the less fortunate (2013–2015)
- Shrenu Parikh as Aastha Agnihotri (née Kirloskar): Shlok's wife, a fearless, liberal, and optimistic woman who strives to promote equality. She navigates the complexities of the Agnihotri residence with determination to bring about change. Aastha holds passionate beliefs about equality and inspires the women in her family to recognize their importance (2013–2015)

=== Recurring ===
- Manish Wadhwa as Niranjan Agnihotri: Shlok's father and Anjali's husband, a wealthy businessman who increasingly resorts to violence and deception to control his family. He escalates domestic violence against his wife to impose regressive household traditions. Niranjan is portrayed as a master of manipulation and deceit, holding misogynistic beliefs and using his wife to achieve his goals (2013–2015)
- Geetanjali Tikekar as Anjali Agnihotri: Shlok's mother and Niranjan's wife, initially portrayed as a strict and controlling mother-in-law. She is later revealed to be suffering from spousal dominance, which causes her to unwittingly devalue women and promote inferior household traditions. Anjali's true emotions toward her children emerge through Aastha’s persistent efforts to foster change, ultimately provoking anger in Niranjan (2013–2015)
- Samir Sharma as Varad Agnihotri: Shlok’s elder brother and Sojal's husband, a media director (2013–2015)
- Shalmalee Desai as Sojal Agnihotri: Varad's wife and Kavya's mother (2013–2015)
- Grace Girdhar as Kavya Agnihotri: Varad and Sojal's daughter (2013–2015)
- Sachin Parikh as Vinayak Agnihotri: Niranjan's younger brother, a talented artist with a friendly personality who is often seen as unassociated with the other men in the Agnihotri family. He does not support or participate in regressive traditions (2013–2014)
- Manjushree Kulkarni as Jaya: Sojal's mother, a foodie with an obsession for material pleasures, who often provides comic relief in the series. (2013–2015)
- Tushar Dalvi as Avdhoot Kirloskar: Aastha's father and Kalindi's husband (2013–2015)
- Prachee Shah as Kalindi Kirloskar: Aastha’s mother and Avdhoot's wife (2013–2015)
- Minal Karpe as Ajju: Aastha’s grandmother and Avdhoot’s mother (2013–2015)
- Deep Jaitley as Abhay Deshmukh: Jyoti's ex-husband, a cruel and aggressively violent man who verbally, physically, and emotionally tortures his wife due to his own dissatisfaction. Abhay uses his wife to release checks issued by Shlok, wrongfully seeking financial stability (2013–2014)
- Sheetal Dabholkar as Jyoti Lokhande (née Agnihotri) (formerly Deshmukh): Shlok’s sister, Abhay's ex-wife, and Siddharth's wife. Suffering from abuse, she reluctantly undergoes illegal abortions twice, ultimately compelling her to escape from her misogynistic and abusive in-laws, who plan to abort her third unborn child based on gender (2013–2015)
- Pratibha Goregaonkar as Sulbha Deshmukh: Jyoti's ex-mother-in-law and Abhay's mother, who seeks to acquire jewelry for monetary gain from the Agnihotris while assisting Abhay in creating an unpleasant atmosphere around Jyoti (2013–2014)
- Karan Gangwal as Suresh: Shlok's assistant (2013–2014)
- Shivani Tomar as Swati: Shlok's ex-girlfriend, who breaks up with him after Anjali insists that she adapt to Agnihotri traditions, forcing her to end the relationship abruptly (2013–2014)
- Shefali Rana as Mangala (2013)
- Neha Sargam as Aditi: Shlok and Aastha’s enemy and Swati's sister. Initially shrouded in mystery, she attempts to separate Shlok and Aastha. It is later revealed that her motivation stems from an obsessive desire to eliminate love from Shlok's life, as she holds him responsible for Swati's unstable health condition (2014)
- Ankit Modgil as Siddharth Lokhande: Jyoti's second husband and Aastha’s cousin. A humble, joyful and charming man, he enters Jyoti's life as a source of relief, providing her accommodation after she runs away from her in-laws during her pregnancy. Siddharth supports Jyoti, striving to make her feel happy and at ease, and eventually falls in love with her (2014–2015)
- Nupur Alankar as Renuka Lokhande: Siddharth's mother (2014–2015)
- Sharmin Kazi as Riya Lokhande: Siddharth's sister (2014)
- Kabeer Maira as Ankush Joshi: Aastha's half-brother and Kalindi's son, an undisciplined and unmannered young man required to reside with Kalindi indefinitely to obtain his inheritance. During his stay, he causes disruption and mischief to irritate Kalindi and her family (2014–2015)
- Anchal Sabharwal as Mansi: Varad’s extramarital affair (2014–2015)
- Aakshi Khari as Apsara: A chirpy village girl who is self-obsessed with her looks (2014–2015)
- Priya Raina as Dr Surbhi: Shlok's childhood friend and a medical doctor who treats Aastha’s memory loss (2015)
- Aarav Chowdhary as Indrajeet Sarkar: An ambitious businessman who illegitimately obtains the Power of Attorney over all of the Agnihotris' assets through deception, motivated to defame their earned reputation. Indrajeet takes advantage of Aastha's memory loss and poses as her husband, illegally changing her identity to Barkha (2015)
- Dolly Minhas as Ahilya Vinas: A woman who deliberately attempts to destroy Niranjan and his family while dishonestly claiming ownership of his properties (2015)
- Roma Bali as Kavita Vinas: Ahilya's daughter (2015)
- Swati Rajput as Poornima Sarkar: Indrajeet's sister (2015)
- Lakshya Wahi as Shantanu Sarkar: Indrajeet's son (2015)
- Reet Sharma as Mishti Sarkar: Indrajeet's daughter (2015)
- Satish Sharma as Pradeep Vinas: Indrajeet's uncle (2015)
- Jaanvi Sangwan as Mousami Vinas: Indrajeet's aunt (2015)

== Production ==
=== Conception ===
Iss Pyaar Ko Kya Naam Doon? Ek Baar Phir was created by Sunjoy Waddhwa, who aimed to develop a series distinct from the first season. He acknowledged that creating a sequel for the television industry is challenging, stating, "Viewers may watch the first couple of episodes out of curiosity but will stop if there is no quality content." Both StarPlus and Waddhwa considered this when planning the new series, introducing viewers to a fresh story, characters, and themes.

=== Development ===
Filming of the series began in April 2013. The show's name was not finalized until months into production, as StarPlus was considering various tentative titles. Initially, the production team considered titles such as Dard-E-Dil, Iss Dil Ka Kya Karoon, and Aastha, but ultimately chose Iss Pyaar Ko Kya Naam Doon? Ek Baar Phir. This decision made it the second installment in the Iss Pyaar Ko Kya Naam Doon? franchise. In August 2013, StarPlus announced that the series would premiere later that month. The network expected Waddhwa to produce a character or theme-driven storyline, claiming that audience expectations are higher for sequels.

=== Casting ===
Avinash Sachdev was selected to play Shlok Agnihotri. He auditioned for the show in January 2013 but did not begin shooting until April 2013. Sachdev stated that his preparation for the role was difficult, as portraying an anti-hero while simultaneously illustrating a love story posed significant challenges. Shrenu Parikh was chosen to portray Aastha Agnihotri.

=== Filming ===
Principal photography for the series began in April 2013, with the opening scenes shot in Wai, Maharashtra. Iss Pyaar Ko Kya Naam Doon? Ek Baar Phir is predominantly filmed in Pune, Maharashtra, using a multiple-camera production style.

=== Broadcast ===
The first promo for Iss Pyaar Ko Kya Naam Doon? Ek Baar Phir’s was released on 13 August 2013. It featured Sachdev and Parikh, primarily depicting Shlok’s defamatory actions towards women as they attempted to rise in the corporate and political industries. Additional promos were later released, showcasing a similar theme.

Iss Pyaar Ko Kya Naam Doon? Ek Baar Phir premiered its first episode on 26 August 2013 on StarPlus. It initially aired Monday to Friday at 6:00 PM (IST). In 2014, the network changed the schedule to a six-day format, airing the series from Monday through Saturday. On 26 January 2015, StarPlus shifted the show’s telecast to an earlier time slot at 5:30 PM (IST) after being granted an extension. The network announced that this decision was based on the series performing well in non-prime slots, aiming to capture more viewers by experimenting with earlier timings.

Iss Pyaar Ko Kya Naam Doon? Ek Baar Phir was made digitally available on 11 February 2015 on the video-on-demand streaming service Disney+ Hotstar.

== Reception ==
=== Critical response ===
India TV described the series as “capitalising on domestic violence to attract viewers” and criticized the character of Niranjan Agnihotri (Manish Wadhwa), for featuring some of the most intimidating scenes. They observed Niranjan as someone who “hides and manipulates the truth about himself, uses his wife to impose his regressive rules, and undermines his family members behind their backs.” The Times of India noted that the depiction of aggressive husbands is becoming a popular narrative.

=== Viewership ===
Despite airing at an early time slot, Iss Pyaar Ko Kya Naam Doon? Ek Baar Phir managed to achieve good ratings throughout its run. The show's audience increased from 1.39 to 2.61 million viewers. In week 50 of 2013, the show experienced another spike, rising from 2.61 to 3.40 million impressions. Iss Pyaar Ko Kya Naam Doon? Ek Baar Phir set a trend as the new prime time slot for daily television shows, beginning as early as 6:00 PM (IST).

In the first week of 2014, the series gained a TVR of 1.70. In week 23 of 2014, the show attracted an audience of 2.80 million, achieving a TVR of 1.30. In the following week, Iss Pyaar Ko Kya Naam Doon? Ek Baar Phir drew 3.0 million viewers with a TVR of 1.40. By week 30 of 2014, the show held an average audience of 3.10 million viewers, an increase from 2.80 million the previous week.

With the show's change in storyline near the end of 2014, Iss Pyaar Ko Kya Naam Doon? Ek Baar Phir saw a drop in its TRP, leading StarPlus to announce a potential off-air date in February 2015. However, the filmmakers improved the ratings, and the show ultimately received an extension until June 2015.

In the United Kingdom, on 8 April 2014, the channel recorded a viewership of 178.5K impressions. As the weeks progressed, the ratings further increased to 214.7K impressions. Thus, Iss Pyaar Ko Kya Naam Doon? Ek Baar Phir became the first show on the UK Asian television channel to achieve a record-high rating in its respective time slot.

== National and international broadcast ==
Iss Pyaar Ko Kya Naam Doon? Ek Baar Phir inspired several multilingual dubs.

=== National ===
- In the Malayalam language as Mounam Sammatham 2, it aired on Asianet Plus and also streams on Hotstar.
- In the Telugu language as Geetha Govindam, it aired on Star Maa and also streams on Hotstar.

=== International ===
- In Armenia as Inchpes Kochel Ays Sere 2 in Armenian, it aired on Armenia TV
- In Canada and the United States as Iss Pyaar Ko Kya Naam Doon? Ek Baar Phir was subtitled in English and transmitted by ATN
- In Indonesia as Inikah Cinta? in Indonesian, it aired on SCTV
- In Russia as как назвать эту любовь? 2 in Russian, it aired on Russian TV
- In South Africa as Strange Love in English, it aired on Star Life
- In Turkey as Tatlı Bela in Turkish, it aired on Kanal 7
- In the United Kingdom as What Shall I Name This Love? Once Again subtitled in English, it aired on StarPlus UK.
