= Chhoti Bahu (TV series) =

2008 Indian TV series

- Created by: DJ's a Creative Unit
- Written by: Shilpa Choubay Sushil Choubay Sanjay Kumar; Damini Kanwal Shetty; Raaj Shetty; Dilip Jha; Archita Biswas Jha; S. Manasvi
- Directed by: Mohit Jha, Meesha Gautam, Khalid Akhtar
- Starring: Rubina Dilaik; Avinash Sachdev
- Theme music composer: Dony Hazarika
- Opening theme: Chhoti Bahu (Season 1) "Baavre Naina" by Krishna Beura "Har Raah Tere" by Ali Aslam (Season 2)
- Composer: Abhijeet Hegdepatil KK
- Country of origin: India
- Original language: Hindi
- No. of seasons: 2
- No. of episodes: 801

Production
- Producers: Tony Singh; Deeya Singh
- Production locations: Mathura; Mumbai
- Running time: 22 minutes
- Production company: DJ's a Creative Unit

Original release
- Network: Zee TV
- Release: 8 December 2008 – 18 May 2012

Chhoti Bahu is an Indian drama television series produced by DJ's a Creative Unit. Season one aired from 8 December 2008 to 17 September 2010 and season two aired from 15 February 2011 to 18 May 2012 on Zee TV. It starred Rubina Dilaik as Radhika and Avinash Sachdev as Dev. The show had two seasons with discrete plots.

== Series overview ==
The show had two seasons titled Chhoti Bahu – Sindoor Bin Suhagan and Chhoti Bahu - Sawar Ke Rang Rachi.

Series	Episodes	Originally released	
Series	Episodes	First released	Last released
1	469	8 December 2008	17 September 2010
2	332	15 February 2011	18 May 2012

== Plot ==
Chhoti Bahu is the love saga of two soulmates Dev and Radhika.

=== Season 1 ===
Shastriji and Devaki live in a Vrindavan, and they have two daughters, Radhika, who is an adopted child, and Vishakha Shastri. Radhika is simple and dutiful, whereas Vishakha wants to be an actress in Bollywood. She is headstrong and selfish. Vishakha and Radhika share a close bond. The Purohits are a well to do from Janakpuri Delhi and have their ancestral home in Vrindavan. They have two sons - Vivek and Dev. The Purohits have great expectations from Dev who falls in love with Radhika. But fate wills otherwise, and he thinks he marries Vishakha due to a confusion. The story takes a dramatic turn when Radhika enters Dev's house, and the stage is set for an unusual love triangle, with each character grappling with peculiar dilemmas.

=== Season 2 ===
Radhika Bhardwaj, a Brahmin by birth, was adopted and brought up by a family of weavers in a small town called Rawal. Dev, whose family has been in the service of Rajpurohits for generations, visits Rawal as a child on the occasion of Radhashtami. Dev and Radhika meet each other and become good friends. Radhika and Dev get married at a young age whilst playing.

== Cast ==
=== Season 1 ===
==== Main ====
- Rubina Dilaik as Radhika Purohit: Devaki and Brijmohan's adoptive daughter; Vishakha's adoptive sister; Dev's wife
- Avinash Sachdev as Dev Purohit: Vaishali and Raj's youngest son; Shantanu and Vivek's brother; Radhika's husband

==== Recurring ====
- Abhinav Shukla as Vikram
- Gopi Desai as Vinodini "Ammaji" Shastri: Brijmohan's mother; Vishakha's grandmother; Radhika's adoptive grandmother
- Keerti Gaekwad Kelkar as Mrinalini Purohit: Vivek's wife
- Rajeev Kumar as Vivek Purohit: Mrinalini and Raj's second son; Shantanu and Dev's brother; Mrinalini's husband
- Hiten Tejwani as Shantanu Purohit: Vaishali and Raj's son; Vivek and Dev's brother
- Harjot Singh Dhaliwal as Chota Purohit
- Prabha Sinha as Vaishali Purohit: Raj's widow; Shantanu, Vivek and Dev's mother
- Priyanka Tiwari as Vishakha Shastri: Devaki and Brijmohan's daughter; Radhika's adoptive sister
- Rishi Khurana as Birju
- Snehal Sahay as Mrs Purohit
- Rita Bhaduri as Shanti Purohit
- Samta Sagar as Devaki Shastri: Brijmohan's wife; Vishakha's mother; Radhika's adoptive mother
- Rajeev Verma as Pandit Brijmohan Shastri: Vinodini's son; Devaki's husband; Vishakha's father; Radhika's adoptive father
- Raj Logani as Arjun Purohit: Sushil's son
- Sanjay Batra as Sushil Purohit: Arjun's father
- Darshan Kumar as Purab
- Shashank Sethi as Keshav Chaubey
- Surendra Pal as Raj Purohit: Vaishali'a late husband; Shantanu, Vivek and Dev's father
- Sonia Singh as Kanika Yaduvanshi: Katyani's daughter; Rajjan's sister; Dev's fake wife
- Vineet Kumar Chaudhary as Rajjan Yaduvanshi: Katyani's son; Kanika's brother
- Sheeba Chaddha as Katyani Yaduvanshi: Rajjan and Kanika's mother
- Drashti Dhami (Guest)
- Divyanka Tripathi as Vidya
- Prachi Desai as Bani
- Ankita Lokhande as Archana
- Rajshree Thakur as Saloni

=== Season 2 ===
==== Main ====
- Rubina Dilaik as
  - Radhika Purohit; Rishikesh's elder daughter; Ruby's sister; Sonia's stepdaughter; Jolly's stepsister; Dev's wife
  - Ruby Bhardwaj; Rishikesh's younger daughter; Radhika's sister; Sonia's stepdaughter Jolly's stepsister
- Avinash Sachdev as Dev Raj Purohit; Harinath's son; Rohan's stepbrother; Radhika's husband

==== Recurring ====
- Gopi Desai as Dai Maa
- Benaf Dadachandji as Barkha
- Sourav Chakraborty as Rohan Harinath Purohit
- Micckie Dudaaney as Virat Gopaldas Purohit
- Sushmita Daan as Padma Harinath Purohit
- Rakesh Pandey as Dadaji
- Sangeeta Kapure as Mohini Virat Purohit
- Chayan Trivedi as Gopaldas Purohit
- Aditya Lakhia as Mansaram
- Sidharth Sen as Chhenu
- Garima Shrivastav as Shanti Radhika's stepmother
- Shivam Jagtap as Chhenu (young age)
- Nishant Shokeen / Pracheen Chauhan as Lord Krishna
- Aman Verma as Asur / Vishwanath
- Vinay Jain as Rishikesh Bhardwaj (RB)
- Kishwer Merchant as Sonia Rishikesh Bhardwaj
- Vijayendra Kumeria as Jolly Bhardwaj
- Srishty Rode as Radha Rani / Madhvi

== Adaptations ==
Language	Title	Original release	Network(s)	Last aired	Notes
Hindi	Chhoti Bahu छोटी बहू	8 December 2008	Zee TV	18 May 2012	Original
Kannada	Radha Kalyana ರಾಧಾ ಕಲ್ಯಾಣ	29 August 2011	Zee Kannada	6 June 2015	Remake
Telugu	Vaidehi Parinayam వైదేహి పరిణయం	31 May 2021	Zee Telugu	27 May 2023	Remake
Malayalam	Snehapoorvam Shyama സ്നേഹപൂർവ്വം ശ്യാമ	30 September 2024	Zee Keralam	Ongoing	Remake
Marathi	Dhaktya Sunbai धाकट्या सूनबाई	28 September 2026	Zee Marathi	Ongoing	Remake
