= Aur Bhai Kya Chal Raha Hai =

Aur Bhai Kya Chal Raha hai! (transl. Brother, what else is going on?) is an Indian Hindi sitcom that premiered on 30 March 2021 on &TV and is digitally available on ZEE5. Produced by Amjad Hussain Sheikh of Shade Productions, the show features Akansha Sharma as Sakina Mirza, Farhana Parveen as Shanti Mishra, Pawan Singh as Zafar Ali Mirza, and Ambarish Bobby as Ramesh Prasad Mishra. Aur Bhai Kya Chal Raha hai! premiered on 30 March 2021, at 9:30 pm on &TV, airing every Monday to Friday.

== Cast ==
=== Main ===
- Akansha Sharma as Sakeena Mirza
- Pawan Kumar Singh as Sakeena's husband Zafar Ali Mirza
- Farhana fatema as Shanti Mishra
- Ambarish Bobby as Shanti's husband
- Annu Awasthi as Bittoo Kapoor
- Sandeep Yadav (actor) as Pappu Pandey
- Abhishek Singh as Dr Kudey Lal
- Pankaj Soni as Brij Bihari Mishra
- Archana Shukla as Begum Noorjahan Mirza
- Mahmood Hashmi as Bachchan
