= Happy Hours (TV series) =

Indian Hindi comedy television series

- Genre: Comedy
- Created by: Subhash Chandra
- Based on: Social Media
- Written by: Charu Gupta
- Directed by: Heera Arora
- Creative director: Hemant Sharma
- Starring: See below
- Country of origin: India
- Original language: Hindi
- No. of episodes: 150

Production
- Producers: Subash Chandra; Piyush Gupta
- Production locations: Mumbai, India
- Camera setup: Multi-camera
- Production companies: Essel Vision Productions; Diamond Pictures

Original release
- Network: &TV
- Release: 29 August 2016 – 24 March 2017

Happy Hours is an Indian Hindi comedy television series, which is broadcast on &TV. The series is produced by Essel Vision Productions and Diamond Pictures.

== Plot ==
The show will showcase talented artists donning different avatars and entertaining the audience with their gags. There is no definite plot as the show takes a topic (which is usually circled around social media) and presents a series of acts each day but always consists of social media jokes, funny videos sent to this show, The Social Baba Act and audience interaction along with one or more acts including The Rangana Kanaut Show, Useless Argument (Debate) and Court Cases.

== Cast ==
- Abhay Singh as Abhay Pratap Singh
- Jaswant Singh as Social Baba
- Aarti Kandpal as Sasu Maa and various characters
- Paritosh Tripathi as Anchor and in various characters
- Monica Murthy and Abhimanyu Kak as Anchors
- Pooja Misrra / Sangeeta Khanayat as Miss Trendy
