= Zaan Khan =

Indian television actor

- Born: 13 September 1993 (age 33); Bhopal, Madhya Pradesh, India
- Occupation: Actor
- Years active: 2013–present
- Known for: Hamari Bahu Silk; Kyun Utthe Dil Chhod Aaye

Zaan Khan (born 13 September 1993) is an Indian television actor. He is best known for his roles in Kyun Utthe Dil Chhod Aaye and Vanshaj.

== Career ==
Zaan Khan started his acting career as a junior artist in the film Satyagraha following which he went on to play prominent roles in several television series. He then was cast in the role of Saransh Tiwari in Maitree. He was last seen playing Varun in Meri Saas Bhoot Hai and Karthik in Vanshaj.

== Filmography ==
=== Films ===
Year(s)	Title	Role	Notes	Ref
2013	Satyagraha		Debut	
2016	DNA Of Love	Yogi		
2017	Call For Fun	Yash	Lead role	
2022	Beintehaanpan		Lead role	
2022	Pyaar Ho Gaya		Lead role	

=== Television ===
Year(s)	Title	Role	Notes	Ref
2014	Jhalli Anjali	Dhruv	TV debut / Lead role	
2015	Pyaar Tune Kya Kiya	Rohan	Episodic lead	
2015, 2016	Yeh Hai Aashiqui	Shrey / Vicky	Episodic lead	
2016	SuperCops Vs Super Villains	Supercop Ashumu/Ashu	Lead role	
2016	Ek Tha Raja Ek Thi Rani	Kunwar Jeevan Singh/Jeeves		
2018	Naamkaran	Karan "KK" Kapoor		
2019	Ishqbaaz	Varun		
2019	Hamari Bahu Silk	Naksh Parekh	Lead role	
2021	Kyun Utthe Dil Chhod Aaye	Randheer Raizada	Lead role	
2023	Maitree	Saransh Tiwari		
2023	Meri Saas Bhoot Hai	Varun		
2023	Vanshaj	Karthik		
2024	Kuch Reet Jagat Ki Aisi Hai	Naren Ratansi	Lead role	

=== Music videos ===
Year	Title	Role	Platform
2020	Ishqdaari	Lead role	Zee Music Company
2023	Tu Mera	Lead role	T-Series

== See also ==
- List of Indian actors
- List of Indian television actors
