= Interrogation (2025 film) =

Indian Hindi-language suspense thriller film

- Official release poster
- Directed by: Ajoy Varma Raja
- Written by: Krishnaprasad Somanathan
- Produced by: Kunwar Pragy Arya; Inderveer; Piyush Dinesh Gupta
- Starring: Manu Singh; Darshan Jariwala; Abhimanyu Singh; Yashpal Sharma; Rajpal Yadav; Girish Kulkarni
- Cinematography: Vishnu Panickar
- Music by: Varun Sunil
- Production companies: Aryan Brothers Entertainment Film; Naam Mein Kya Rakha Hai Production
- Distributed by: ZEE5
- Release date: 30 May 2025
- Running time: 95 minutes
- Country: India
- Language: Hindi

Interrogation(Hindi: पूछताछ) is a 2025 Indian Hindi-language suspense thriller film directed by Ajoy Varma Raja. The film is jointly produced by Kunwar Pragy Arya, Inderveer, and Piyush Dinesh Gupta under the banners of Aryan Brothers Entertainment Film and Naam Mein Kya Rakha Hai Production. It stars Manu Singh in his debut role, alongside Darshan Jariwala, Abhimanyu Singh, Yashpal Sharma, Rajpal Yadav, Girish Kulkarni and others. The film released on 30 May 2025 on ZEE5.

== Plot ==
A retired judge is found dead in his home. A police officer interrogates four of his close associates, who had met him on the day of his death. As the investigation unfolds, secrets are revealed, leading to unexpected twists and turns.

== Cast ==
- Manu Singh as Vishal
- Darshan Jariwala as Vishesh Ishkaran Parashar
- Abhimanyu Singh
- Yashpal Sharma as Yusuf
- Rajpal Yadav as Bansilal
- Girish Kulkarni as Rajan
- Ritooja Shinde as Tara
- Kunwar Pragy as Arya

== Production ==
The film marks the acting debut of Manu Singh, who portrays the lead role of Vishal. Manu Singh prepared extensively for the role by observing real-life interrogations and immersing himself in the character's psychological state. The film was shot in the landscapes of Ladakh, India.

== Music ==
The soundtrack of the film features songs sung by Sonu Nigam and Ritika Parmeshwar, complementing the film's suspenseful and emotional tones.

== Release ==
Interrogation was released on 30 May 2025 on the OTT platform ZEE5.
