= Rajdhani Express (film) =

- Theatrical release poster
- Directed by: Ashok Kohli
- Produced by: Manoj Kejriwal; Ritika Kohli; Rajesh K Patel
- Starring: Leander Paes; Sudhanshu Pandey; Priyanshu Chatterjee; Jimmy Sheirgill
- Music by: Lahu-Madhav; Ritesh Nalini; Bappi Tutul
- Production company: Cine Acts production
- Release date: 4 January 2013
- Country: India
- Language: Hindi
- Budget: ₹ 50 million

Rajdhani Express is an Indian Hindi-language film directed by Ashok Kohli. Produced by CineActs Production, Trueman Entertainment & SLA Impex Pvt Ltd, the film features tennis player Leander Paes in the lead role and marks his Bollywood debut alongside Jimmy Sheirgill, Puja Banerjee, Priyanshu Chatterjee, Gulshan Grover, Kiran Kumar, Mukesh Rishi, Sudhanshu Pandey, Sayali Bhagat, Achint Kaur and Shilpa Shukla. Paes' voice has been dubbed by actor Amitosh Nagpal. This movie is named after an Express Train of India connects with New Delhi and various routes Rajdhani Express.

The film follows a man who goes on the run to escape from his godfather, and in the process, boards the Mumbai-bound Rajdhani Express where he soon finds himself labeled a terrorist after some incidents prompt him to pull out a gun.

The film was released theatrically on 4 January 2013. It received largely unfavorable reviews, with some critics labeling the film an "unintentional comedy" while also criticizing the performances (especially Paes) and narration. The film bombed at the box office, grossing ₹0.35 crores.

== Synopsis ==
Tired of working for his godfather, who's a notorious gunrunner, Keshav (Leander Paes) flees away with a bag of arms and boards the Rajdhani Express bound for Mumbai. He has no idea that he has been set up by his boss' daughter. She has reported him to the police, following which Deputy Commissioner Yadav (Jimmy Sheirgill) of Mumbai's Anti-Terrorism Squad wants to arrest him at any cost. While sharing the same cabin during the journey with some passengers, Keshav initially acts as an outcast before he is prompted to pull out a gun and eventually get declared a terrorist. This leads to Yadav hatching a scheme to settle scores with the minister and further silence the passengers who have understood his plan. With the train racing to Mumbai, Keshav must devise a plan to win back his freedom and expose Yadav.

== Cast ==
- Leander Paes as Keshav
- Jimmy Sheirgill as Deputy Commissioner Yadav
- Priyanshu Chatterjee as Mr. Banerjee
- Sudhanshu Pandey as Muneesh
- Puja Banerjee as Sunita
- Sayali Bhagat as Reena
- Mukesh Rishi as S.I.
- Ishrat Ali as Minister Indrale
- Kiran Kumar as Bhaijee
- Achint Kaur as Pearl
- Shilpa Shukla as Lady Si
- Gulshan Grover as T.T.E
- Sanjay Gagnani

== Soundtrack ==
The soundtrack is composed by Lahu-Madhav, Bappi Tutul & Ritesh Nalini.

1. Tera Zikr – Suresh Wadkar, Madhusmita Borthakur
2. Koi Umeed – Hitesh Prasad
3. Karte Hain Dil Se – Udit Narayan
4. Koi Umeed (Indian) – Shahid Mallya
5. Main Hoon Pathit -
6. Armaan Jagaati Hai – Shaan

=== Reception ===
The soundtrack received negative reviews. Joginder Tuteja from Bollywood Hungama gave the soundtrack 1.5 stars out of 5, and expressed surprise at the very inclusion of songs in the film. He, however praised the song Koi Umeed (Western).

== Critical reception ==
The film received generally unfavorable reviews from critics.

Vinayak Chakravorty from India Today gave the film 2 stars out of 5 and felt it lacked "a story and imagination to thrill". The Times of India gave the film 1.5 stars out of 5 and felt the film was "more of an unintentional comedy than a socio-political thriller". The reviewer also criticized the editing, performances and dialogues while praising Gulshan Grover and Priyanshu Chatterjee. Similarly giving the film 1.5 stars out of 5, Taran Adarsh from Bollywood Hungama felt the film's writing was a "mixed bag" while praising a few performances. Gaurav Malani from The Economic Times gave it 1 stars out of 5 and criticized the writing, direction and Paes' performance. Ankur Pathak from Rediff.com gave the film no rating and felt the plot was "non-existent" while also criticizing the performances and execution. A reviewer writing for Firstpost labelled the film an unintentional comedy and criticized Paes' performance, editing, writing, dialogues and direction.
