= &TV =

Indian Hindi-language television channel

- Logo used since 2025
- Country: India
- Broadcast area: Worldwide
- Headquarters: Mumbai, Maharashtra, India

Programming
- Language: Hindi
- Picture format: 1080i HDTV (downscaled to letterboxed 576i for the SDTV feed)
- Timeshift service: &TV +1

Ownership
- Owner: Zee Entertainment Enterprises

History
- Launched: 2 March 2015; 11 years ago (India and MENA); 6 April 2015; 11 years ago (UK and Europe) Original); 31 August 2016; 10 years ago (USA) "Sling TV and DISH Announce Landmark Agreement with Zee". 11 November 2024 (UK) (revival)
- Replaced: Lamhe (UK)
- Closed: 1 June 2019 (UK)

Links
- Website: andtv.zee5.com

Availability - Available on all major Indian DTH & Cables.

Terrestrial
- DVB-T2 (India): Check local frequencies

Streaming media
- ZEE5: SD & HD
- Jio TV: SD & HD

&TV, also known as And TV, is a Hindi-language entertainment channel owned by Zee Entertainment Enterprises (ZEEL). Launched as a general entertainment channel from ZEEL group, it started broadcasting on 2 March 2015 with internationally in Middle East. On 6 April 2015, &TV launched in UK replacing Lamhe. On 1 June 2019, &TV was closed in the UK due to the launch of ZEE5. On 11 November 2024, &TV relaunched in the UK on Samsung TV Plus and Rakuten tv on 10 March 2025.

== Associated channels ==
=== &Pictures ===
&Pictures
- Logo used since 2025
- Type: Movie channel
- Country: India

Programming
- Language: Hindi

Ownership
- Owner: Zee Entertainment Enterprises

History
- Launched: August 18, 2013

&Pictures is a Hindi satellite movie channel in India based in Mumbai. The channel is owned by Zee Entertainment Enterprises. It is the first channel of Zee Entertainment Enterprises under the new brand &.

=== &Xplor HD ===
&Xplor HD logo

&Xplor HD is an HD-only premium movie channel owned by Zee Entertainment Enterprises. It was launched on 18 July 2019 only on Airtel Digital TV, but by late 2023, they added the channel on Tata Play. It shows critically-acclaimed and arthouse Bollywood movies.

== Former broadcasts ==
=== Drama ===
Year	Show	Ref
2015–2016	Adhuri Kahaani Hamari	
2015–2016	Agent Raghav – Crime Branch	
2017–2019	Agnifera	
2015–2016	Bhagyalakshmi	
2015–2016	Begusarai	
2015	Badii Devrani	
2016–2018	Badho Bahu	
2021–2022	Baal Shiv – Mahadev Ki Andekhi Gatha	
2018	Bitti Business Wali	
2017	Chupke Chupke	
2015	Dilli Wali Thakur Gurls	
2022–2023	Doosri Maa	
2019–2024	Ek Mahanayak – Dr. B. R. Ambedkar	
2017	Ek Vivah Aisa Bhi	
2015–2017	Gangaa	
2021–2022	Ghar Ek Mandir Kripa Agrasen Maharaj Ki	
2017–2018	Half Marriage	
2016–2017	Hoshiyar... Sahi Waqt, Sahi Kadam	
2019	Jaat Na Poocho Prem Ki	
2016	Kahani Hamari... Dil Dosti Deewanepan Ki	
2020	Kahat Hanuman Jai Shree Ram	
2019	Main Bhi Ardhangini	
2016	Meri Awaaz Hi Pehchaan Hai	
2017–2019	Meri Hanikarak Biwi	
2018	Mitegi Laxman Rekha	
2021	Mauka-E-Vardaat	
2017–2020	Paramavatar Shri Krishna	
2018–2019	Perfect Pati	
2016–2017	Queens Hai Hum	
2015	Razia Sultan	
2015–2017	Santoshi Maa	
2016	Saubhagyalakshmi	
2017–2019	Siddhi Vinayak	
2016	Tere Bin	
2015	Tujhse Naaraz Nahin Zindagi	
2018–2019	Vikram Betaal Ki Rahasya Gatha	
2017–2018	Vaani Rani	
2016–2017	Waaris	
2015–2016	Yeh Kahan Aa Gaye Hum	
2020–2021	Yeshu	
2024–2025	Bheema-Andhkar Se Adhikar Tak	

=== Comedy ===
Year	Show
2021–2022	Aur Bhai Kya Chal Raha Hai
2017	Bakula Bua Ka Bhoot
2015–2026	Bhabiji Ghar Par Hain!
2025–2026	Gharwali Pedwali
2019–2021	Gudiya Hamari Sabhi Pe Bhari
2019–2026	Happu Ki Ultan Paltan
2016–2017	Happy Hours
2016	LKR – Life Ka Recharge
2019	Shaadi Ke Siyape

=== Horror, fantasy and supernatural ===
Year	Show	Ref
2018–2019	Daayan	
2015–2016	Darr Sabko Lagta Hai	
2017	Kuldeepak	
2018–2020	Laal Ishq	

=== Reality / Non-scripted programming ===
Year	Show	Ref
2015	Deal Ya No Deal	
2018	High Fever	
2015	India Poochega Sabse Shaana Kaun?	
2017	India's Asli Champion	
2015	Killer Karoke Atkah Toh Latkah	
2018	Love Me India	
2016	So You Think You Can Dance	
2025	Shaadi Mubarak – Phere Aur Fun Unlimited	
2017	Taste Match	
2015–2017	The Voice	
2016–2018	The Voice India Kids	
