= List of Hindi television actresses =

Notable actresses of Hindi television across eras

Doordarshan Era
(1980s to mid-1990s)
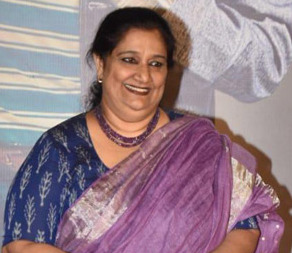
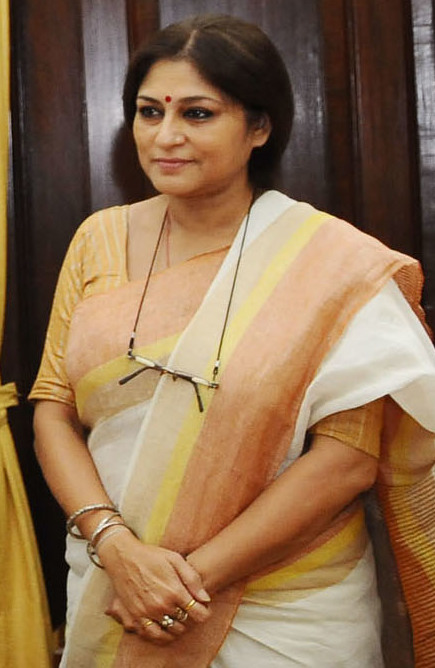
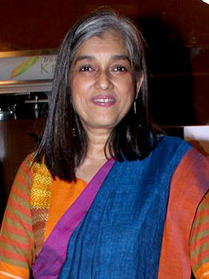
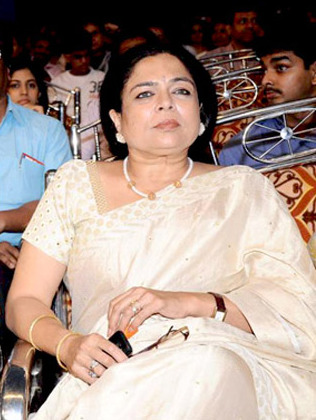
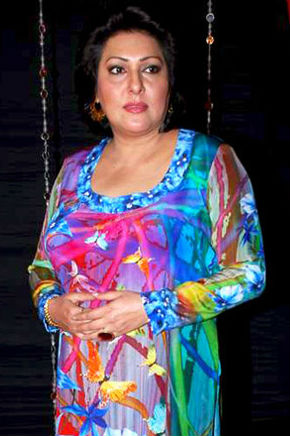
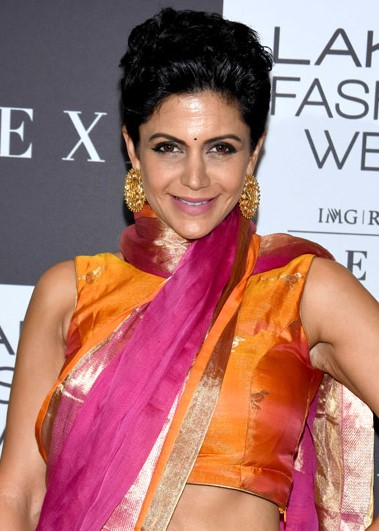
(left to right) Seema Pahwa, Roopa Ganguly, Ratna Pathak Shah, Reema Lagoo, Renuka Shahane, Archana Puran Singh, Neena Gupta, Navneet Nishan and Mandira Bedi

Cable TV Boom Era
(late 1990s to mid-2000s)
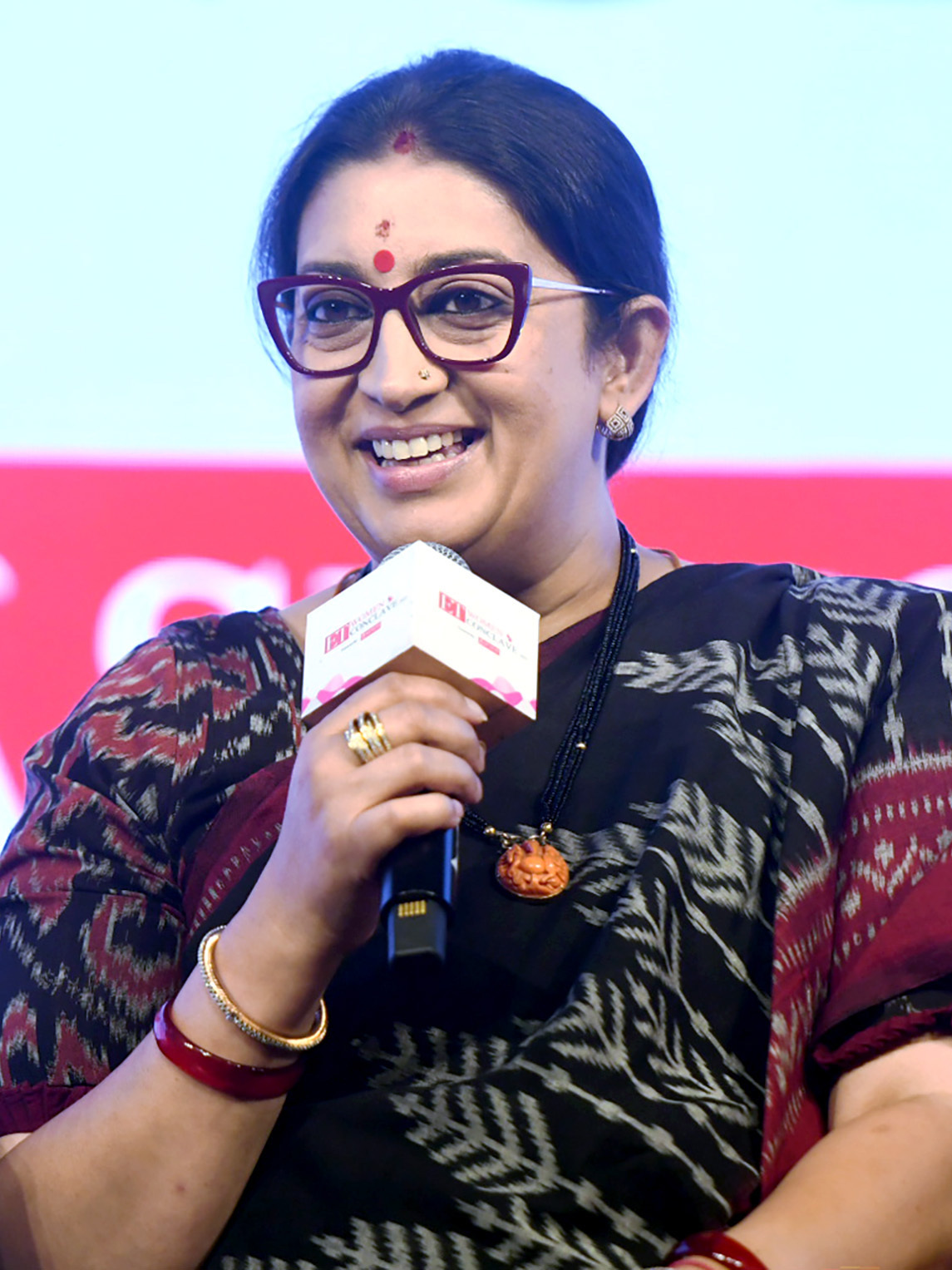
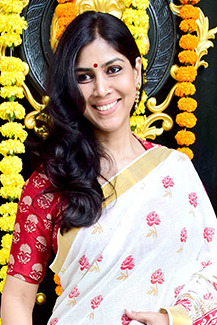
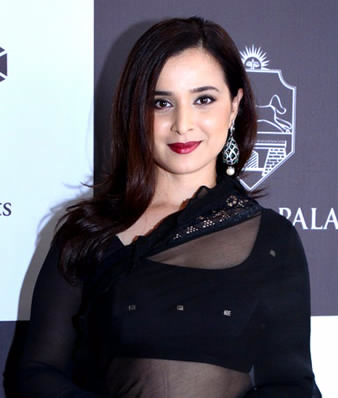
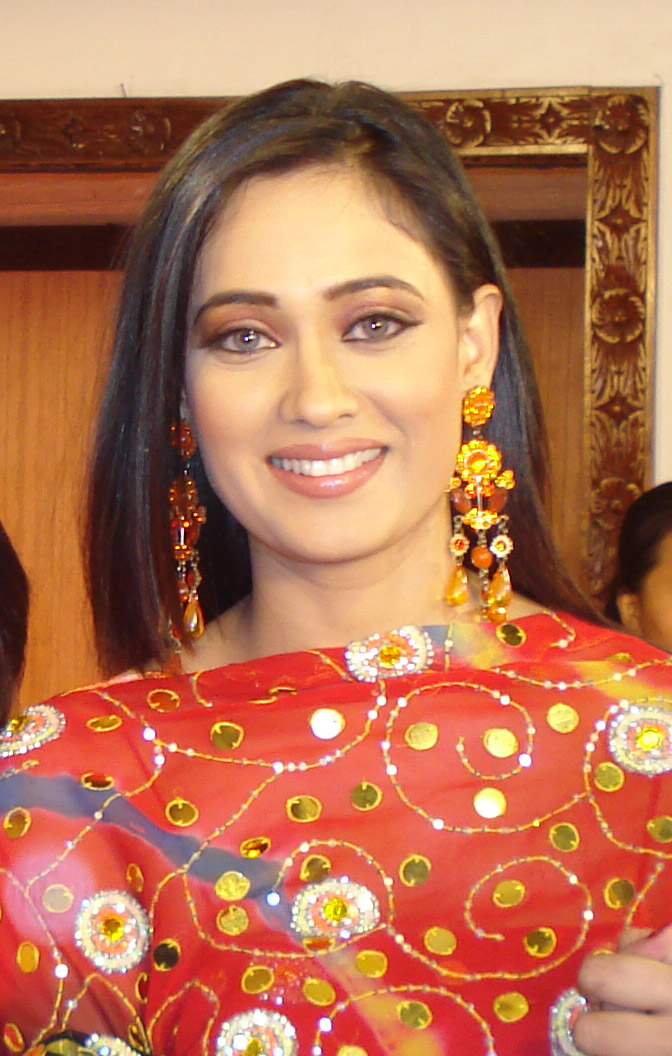
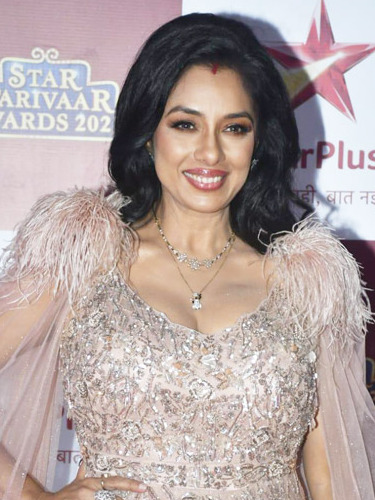
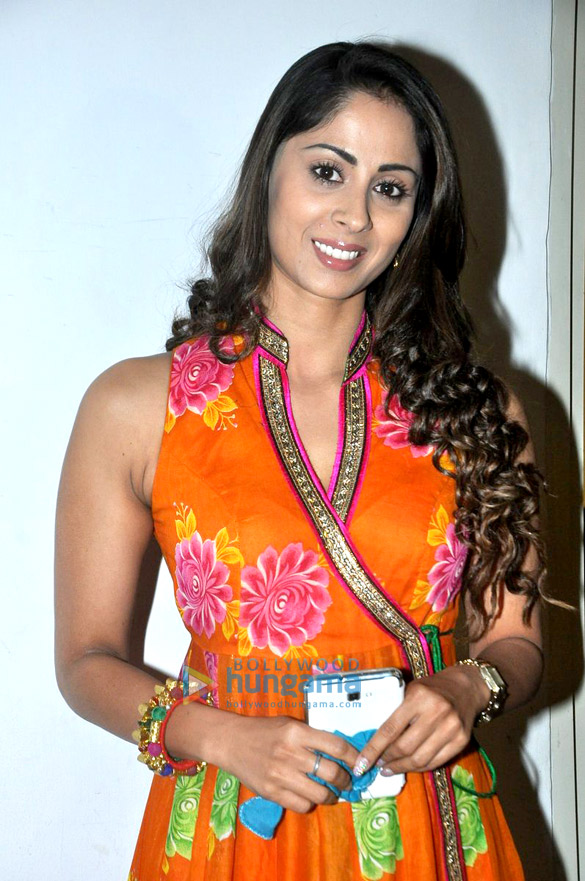
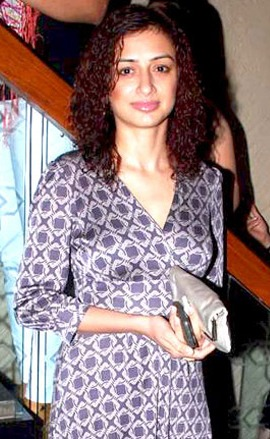
(left to right) Smriti Irani, Gautami Kapoor, Sakshi Tanwar, Simone Singh, Shweta Tiwari, Rupali Ganguly, Sangeeta Ghosh, Shruti Seth, Gauri Pradhan and Mona Singh

DTH Revolution Era
(late 2000s to mid-2010s)
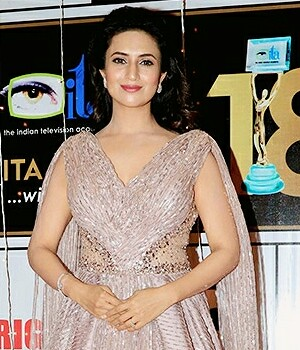
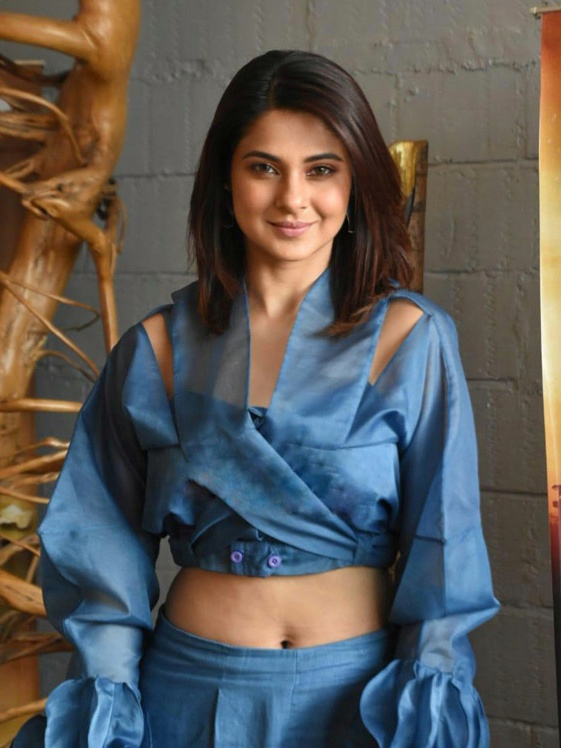
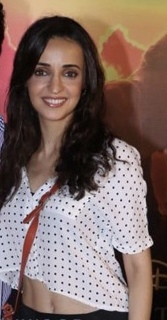
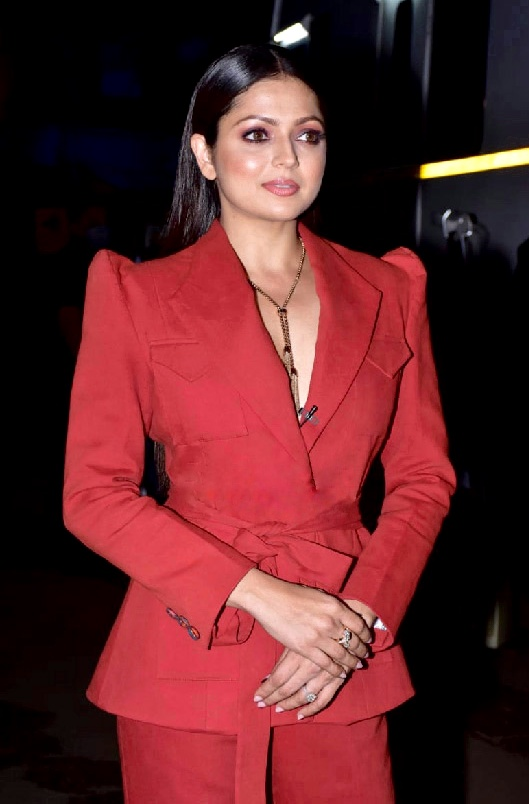
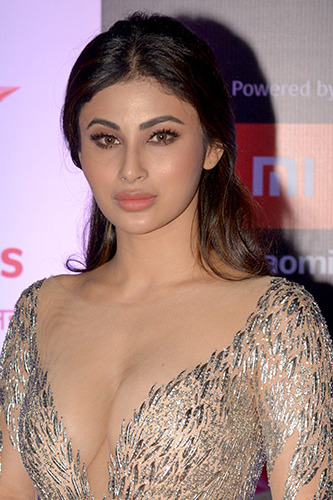
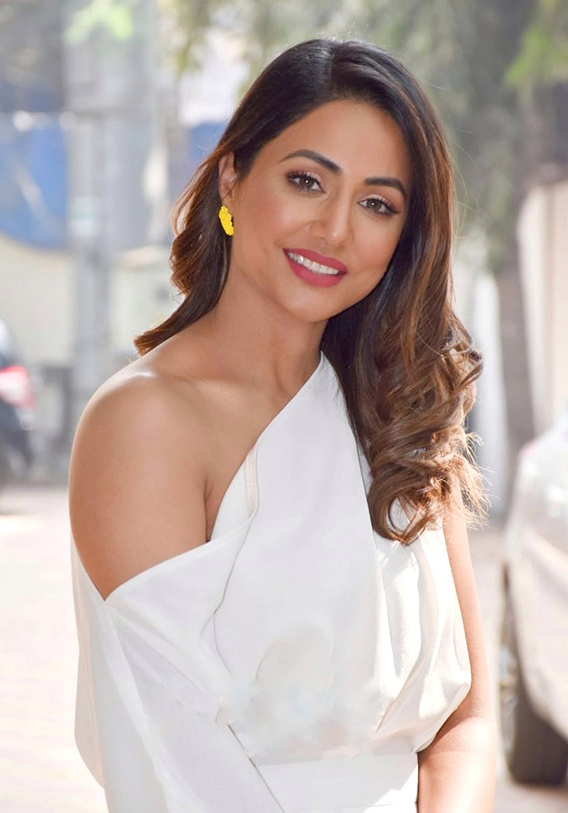
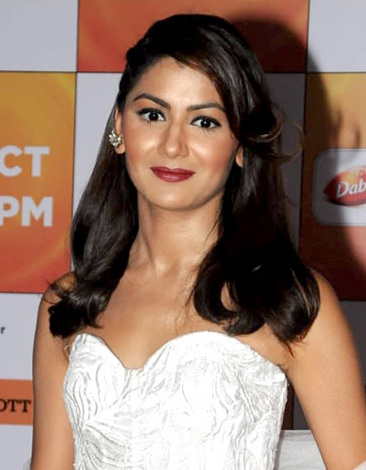
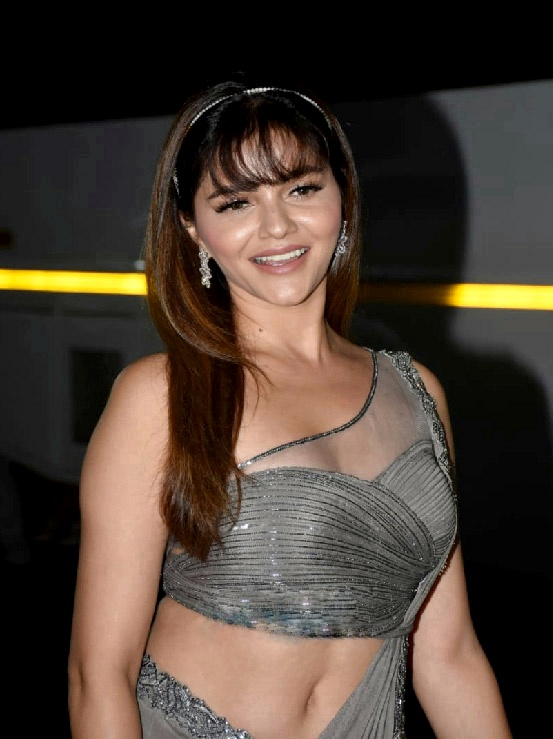
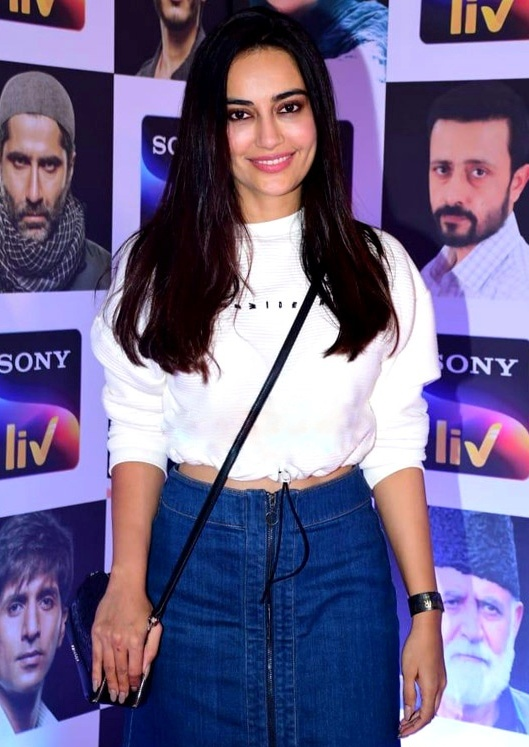
(left to right) Divyanka Tripathi, Jennifer Winget, Sanaya Irani, Drashti Dhami, Mouni Roy, Hina Khan, Nia Sharma, Sriti Jha, Rubina Dilaik and Surbhi Jyoti

OTT Boom Era
(late 2010s to present)
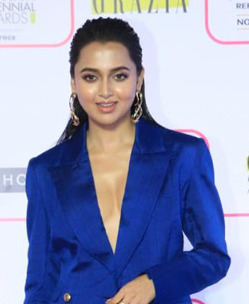
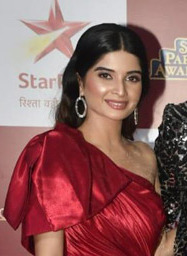
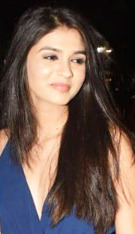
(left to right) Hiba Nawab, Erica Fernandes, Shivangi Joshi, Tejasswi Prakash, Bhavika Sharma, Jannat Zubair Rahmani, Pranali Rathod, Sumbul Touqeer and Ashnoor Kaur

The following is a list of notable actresses who have appeared in Hindi-language television, encompassing daily soaps, serials, reality shows, and streaming-based dramas primarily produced in Mumbai, India. Hindi television, often referred to as the “small screen,” has been a crucial part of Indian broadcasting since the 1980s, providing a platform for numerous actresses to achieve widespread popularity and shape popular culture.

During the early years of Doordarshan, India’s public broadcaster, series such as Hum Log, Rajni, Buniyaad, and Udaan introduced some of Hindi television’s first prominent female characters. Many actresses, including Seema Pahwa, Anita Kanwal, Priya Tendulkar, and Kavita Chaudhary were praised for portraying ordinary women with realism and social relevance during this period. Simultaneously, mythological serials like Ramayan and Mahabharat, made actresses such as Dipika Chikhlia and Roopa Ganguly popular household names, and also contributed significantly to the popularity of television. In the 1990s, the rise of private satellite channels such as Zee TV, Sony TV, and Star Plus began to transform the medium. This era saw the emergence of actresses like Renuka Shahane, Neena Gupta, Bhavna Balsavar, Mandira Bedi, Supriya Pilgaonkar and Navneet Nishan for their work in various diverse shows like Surabhi, Dekh Bhai Dekh, Shanti, Shriman Shrimati, Tara, Tu Tu Main Main and Saans.

At the turn of the millennium, the daily-soap boom, dominated by soap operas produced by Ekta Kapoor's Balaji Telefilms, placed actresses at the centre of Hindi television's growing popularity. Smriti Irani's role as Tulsi Virani in Star Plus's long-running family drana Kyunki Saas Bhi Kabhi Bahu Thi established a template for "saas bahu" sagas, and actresses such as Sakshi Tanwar (Kahaani Ghar Ghar Kii), Shweta Tiwari (Kasautii Zindagii Kay), Gautami Kapoor (Ghar Ek Mandir), Anita Hassanandani (Kabhii Sautan Kabhii Sahelii), Gauri Pradhan Tejwani (Kutumb) and Aamna Sharif (Kahiin to Hoga) became Balaji's most popular faces on television. Other notable actresses during this period were Simone Singh (Heena), Sandhya Mridul (Koshish – Ek Aashaa), Sangeeta Ghosh (Des Mein Niklla Hoga Chand), Niki Aneja Walia (Astitva...Ek Prem Kahani), Juhi Parmar (Kumkum – Ek Pyara Sa Bandhan) and Mona Singh (Jassi Jaissi Koi Nahin). By the late 2000s, several new faces started to become popular with the rise of socially-themed, niche and unique shows, like Divyanka Tripathi Dahiya (Banoo Main Teri Dulhann), Sara Khan (Sapna Babul Ka... Bidaai), Avika Gor (Balika Vadhu), Ratan Rajput (Agle Janam Mohe Bitiya Hi Kijo) and Ragini Khanna (Bhaskar Bharti). This continued into the 2010s, when actresses like Jennifer Winget, Hina Khan, Drashti Dhami, Sanaya Irani, Sriti Jha, Rubina Dilaik, and Surbhi Jyoti gained further prominence by headlining popular shows such as Yeh Rishta Kya Kehlata Hai, Iss Pyaar Ko Kya Naam Doon?, Madhubala – Ek Ishq Ek Junoon, Beyhadh, and Shakti — Astitva Ke Ehsaas Ki, while also gaining wider recognition through reality formats including Bigg Boss and Khatron Ke Khiladi.

Over the years, there have been many crossover stars who first achieved popularity on television and later became successful in films or digital media, like Vidya Balan, Prachi Desai, Yami Gautam, Mrunal Thakur, among many others. As the medium continues to evolve, Hindi television actresses remain at the forefront of entertainment, shaping narratives that reach millions of homes daily. The following list highlights some of the most prominent Hindi television actresses, over the years.

== Television actresses ==
Debut year	Name	Known for		
1987	Dipika Chikhlia	Ramayan		
1988	Roopa Ganguly	Mahabharat		
1990	Supriya Pilgaonkar	Tu Tu Main Main		
1990	Supriya Pilgaonkar	Sasural Genda Phool		
1990	Supriya Pilgaonkar	Kuch Rang Pyar Ke Aise Bhi		
1993	Deepshikha Nagpal	Shaktimaan		
1995	Neha Pendse	Hasratein		
1995	Neha Pendse	Rishtey (TV series)		
1995	Neha Pendse	May I Come in Madam?		
1995	Neha Pendse	Bhabiji Ghar Par Hain!		
1995	Neha Pendse	May I Come In Madam? season 2		
1998	Anita Hassanandani	Idhar Udhar		
1998	Anita Hassanandani	Kabhii Sautan Kabhii Sahelii		
1998	Anita Hassanandani	Kkavyanjali		
1998	Anita Hassanandani	Yeh Hai Mohabbatein		
1998	Anita Hassanandani	Naagin (2015 TV series)		
1998	Juhi Parmar	Kumkum – Ek Pyara Sa Bandhan		
1998	Juhi Parmar	Bigg Boss 5		
1999	Gauri Pradhan	Kutumb (TV series)		
1999	Gauri Pradhan	Meri Aashiqui Tum Se Hi		
1999	Gauri Pradhan	Tu Aashiqui	Sheetal Agashe	Yes Boss (TV series)
1999	Eva Grover	Office Office		
1999	2000	Smriti Irani	Kyunki Saas Bhi Kabhi Bahu Thi	
Mouli Ganguly	2000	Kaahin Kissii Roz		
Sakshi Tanwar	2000	Kahaani Ghar Ghar Kii		
Sakshi Tanwar	2000	Bade Achhe Lagte Hain		
Kiran Dubey	2000	Kyunki Saas Bhi Kabhi Bahu Thi		
Kiran Dubey	2000	Kahaani Ghar Ghar Kii		
Kiran Dubey	2000	Kkusum		
2001	Shweta Tiwari	Kasautii Zindagii Kay		
2001	Shweta Tiwari	Bigg Boss 4		
2001	Shweta Tiwari	Parvarrish		
2001	Shweta Tiwari	Ek Thhi Naayka		
2001	Shweta Tiwari	Baalveer		
2001	Shweta Tiwari	Mere Dad Ki Dulhan		
2001	Shweta Tiwari	Main Hoon Aparajita		
2001	Jennifer Winget	Kasautii Zindagii Kay		
2001	Jennifer Winget	Dill Mill Gayye		
2001	Jennifer Winget	Saraswatichandra (TV series)		
2001	Jennifer Winget	Beyhadh		
2001	Jennifer Winget	Bepannah		
2001	Jennifer Winget	Beyhadh 2		
2001	Kavita Kaushik	Kutumb (TV series)		
2001	Kavita Kaushik	Kahaani Ghar Ghar Kii		
2001	Kavita Kaushik	F.I.R. (TV series)		
2001	Kavita Kaushik	Dr. Madhumati On Duty		
2001	Kavita Kaushik	Savdhaan India		
2001	Shilpa Shinde	Bhabiji Ghar Par Hain!		
2001	Shilpa Shinde	Bigg Boss 11		
2001	Urvashi Dholakia	Kasautii Zindagii Kay		
2001	Urvashi Dholakia	Bigg Boss 6		
2003	Aamna Sharif	Kahiin to Hoga		
2003	Aamna Sharif	Hongey Judaa Na Hum		
2003	Aamna Sharif	Ek Thhi Naayka		
2003	Aamna Sharif	Kasautii Zindagii Kay 2		
2003	Divyanka Tripathi	Yeh Hai Mohabbatein		
2003	Divyanka Tripathi	Banoo Main Teri Dulhann		
2003	Divyanka Tripathi	Nach Baliye		
2003	Divyanka Tripathi	Khatron Ke Khiladi 11		
2003	Sheena Bajaj	Jassi Jaissi Koi Nahin		
2003	Sheena Bajaj	Best of Luck Nikki		
2003	Sheena Bajaj	Thapki Pyar Ki		
2003	Sheena Bajaj	Mariam Khan – Reporting Live		
2003	Sheena Bajaj	Vanshaj		
2003	Tina Datta	Uttaran		
2003	Tina Datta	Koi Aane Ko Hai		
2003	Tina Datta	Hum Rahein Na Rahein Hum		
2003	Shruti Seth	Shararat (TV series)		
2004	Aditi Sharma	India's Best Cinestars Ki Khoj		
2004	Aditi Sharma	Gangaa		
2004	Aditi Sharma	Silsila Badalte Rishton Ka		
2004	Aditi Sharma	Katha Ankahee		
2004	Barkha Bisht	Kitni Mast Hai Zindagi		
2004	Shraddha Arya	Main Lakshmi Tere Aangan Ki		
2004	Shraddha Arya	Tumhari Paakhi		
2004	Shraddha Arya	Kundali Bhagya		
2004	Himanshi Choudhry	Des Mein Niklla Hoga Chand		
2004	Himanshi Choudhry	Tu Aashiqui		
2004	Nandini Singh	Kesar		
2005	Digangana Suryavanshi	Ruk Jaana Nahin		
2005	Digangana Suryavanshi	Qubool Hai		
2005	Digangana Suryavanshi	Ek Veer Ki Ardaas...Veera		
2005	Digangana Suryavanshi	Bigg Boss 9		
2006	Rashami Desai	Pari Hoon Main		
2006	Rashami Desai	Meet Mila De Rabba		
2006	Rashami Desai	Bigg Boss 15		
2006	Rashami Desai	Bigg Boss 13		
2006	Rashami Desai	Uttaran		
2006	Rashami Desai	Dil Se Dil Tak		
2006	Rashami Desai	Khatron Ke Khiladi 6		
2006	Rashami Desai	Jhalak Dikhhla Jaa season 5		
2006	Aditi Bhatia	Tujh Sang Preet Lagai Sajna		
2006	Aditi Bhatia	Tashan-e-Ishq		
2006	Aditi Bhatia	Yeh Hai Mohabbatein		
2006	Aditi Bhatia	Comedy Circus		
2006	Aditi Bhatia	Khatra Khatra Khatra		
2006	Prachi Desai	Kasamh Se		
2006	Prachi Desai	Jhalak Dikhhla Jaa		
2006	Shubhangi Atre	Bhabiji Ghar Par Hain!		
2006	Saumya Tandon	Bhabiji Ghar Par Hain!		
2007	Sneha Wagh	Jyoti (TV series)		
2007	Sara Khan	Sapna Babul Ka... Bidaai		
2007	Parul Chauhan	Sapna Babul Ka... Bidaai		
2007	Sriti Jha	Jiya Jale		
2007	Sriti Jha	Shaurya Aur Suhani		
2007	Sriti Jha	Dil Se Di Dua... Saubhagyavati Bhava?		
2007	Sriti Jha	Kumkum Bhagya		
2007	Sriti Jha	Balika Vadhu		
2007	Sriti Jha	Khatron Ke Khiladi 12		
2007	Navika Kotia	Kasamh Se		
2007	Navika Kotia	Baa Bahoo Aur Baby		
2007	Navika Kotia	Maryada: Lekin Kab Tak?		
2007	Navika Kotia	Yeh Rishta Kya Kehlata Hai		
2007	Navika Kotia	Kyunki Saas Maa Bahu Beti Hoti Hai		
2007	Mouni Roy	Kyunki Saas Bhi Kabhi Bahu Thi		
2007	Mouni Roy	Do Saheliyaan... Kismat Ki Kathputaliyaan		
2007	Mouni Roy	Devon Ke Dev...Mahadev		
2007	Mouni Roy	Naagin		
2007	Mouni Roy	Jhalak Dikhhla Jaa season 7		
2007	Kratika Sengar	Kya Dill Mein Hai		
2007	Kratika Sengar	Ek Veer Stree Ki Kahaani – Jhansi Ki Rani		
2007	Kratika Sengar	Punar Vivaah – Zindagi Milegi Dobara		
2007	Kratika Sengar	Service Wali Bahu		
2007	Kratika Sengar	Kasam Tere Pyaar Ki		
2007	Sukirti Kandpal	Dill Mill Gayye		
2007	Sukirti Kandpal	Pyaar Kii Ye Ek Kahaani		
2007	Sukirti Kandpal	Dilli Wali Thakur Gurls		
2007	Sukirti Kandpal	Story 9 Months Ki		
2007	Madhurima Tuli	Kumkum Bhagya		
2007	Madhurima Tuli	Chandrakanta		
2007	Madhurima Tuli	Qayamat Ki Raat		
2007	Madhurima Tuli	Nach Baliye		
2007	Madhurima Tuli	Bigg Boss 13		
2007	Sanaya Irani	Miley Jab Hum Tum		
2007	Sanaya Irani	Iss Pyaar Ko Kya Naam Doon?		
2007	Sanaya Irani	Rangrasiya		
2007	Sanaya Irani	Jhalak Dikhhla Jaa season 8		
2007	Kashmira Irani	Amber Dhara		
2007	Kashmira Irani	Dharmakshetra		
2007	Priyanka Bassi	Left Right Left (TV series)		
2008	Disha Vakani	Taarak Mehta Ka Ooltah Chashmah		
2008	Neha Mehta	Taarak Mehta Ka Ooltah Chashmah		
2008	Jennifer Mistry Bansiwal	Taarak Mehta Ka Ooltah Chashmah		
2008	Munmun Dutta	Taarak Mehta Ka Ooltah Chashmah		
2008	Sonalika Joshi	Taarak Mehta Ka Ooltah Chashmah		
2008	Ragini Khanna	Sasural Genda Phool		
2008	Drashti Dhami	Geet – Hui Sabse Parayi		
2008	Drashti Dhami	Madhubala – Ek Ishq Ek Junoon		
2008	Drashti Dhami	Pardes Mein Hai Mera Dil		
2008	Drashti Dhami	Silsila Badalte Rishton Ka		
2008	Drashti Dhami	Jhalak Dikhhla Jaa season 6		
2008	Rubina Dilaik	Chotti Bahu		
2008	Rubina Dilaik	Chotti Bahu 2		
2008	Rubina Dilaik	Jeannie Aur Juju		
2008	Rubina Dilaik	Shakti – Astitva Ke Ehsaas Ki		
2008	Rubina Dilaik	Bigg Boss 14		
2008	Rubina Dilaik	Khatron Ke Khiladi 12		
2008	Rubina Dilaik	Jhalak Dikhhla Jaa season 10		
2008	Hiba Nawab	Crazy Stupid Ishq		
2008	Hiba Nawab	Tere Sheher Mein		
2008	Hiba Nawab	Meri Saasu Maa		
2008	Hiba Nawab	Bhaag Bakool Bhaag		
2008	Hiba Nawab	Jijaji Chhat Per Hain		
2008	Mahima Makwana	Sapne Suhane Ladakpan Ke		
2008	Mahima Makwana	Rishton Ka Chakravyuh		
2008	Mahima Makwana	Mariam Khan – Reporting Live		
2008	Mahima Makwana	Shubharambh		
2008	Avika Gor	Balika Vadhu		
2008	Avika Gor	Sasural Simar Ka		
2008	Neha Marda	Balika Vadhu		
2008	Neha Marda	Doli Armaano Ki		
2009	Adaa Khan	Behenein		
2009	Adaa Khan	Amrit Manthan		
2009	Adaa Khan	Naagin (2015 TV series)		
2009	Adaa Khan	Comedy Nights Bachao		
2009	Adaa Khan	Khatron Ke Khiladi 10		
2009	Ankita Lokhande	Pavitra Rishta		
2009	Surbhi Chandna	Ishqbaaaz		
2009	Surbhi Chandna	Naagin (2015 TV series)		
2009	Surbhi Chandna	Qubool Hai		
2009	Surbhi Chandna	Sanjivani (2019 TV series)		
2009	Surbhi Chandna	Sherdil Shergill		
2009	Hina Khan	Yeh Rishta Kya Kehlata Hai		
2009	Hina Khan	Khatron Ke Khiladi 8		
2009	Hina Khan	Bigg Boss 11		
2009	Hina Khan	Kasautii Zindagii Kay (2018 TV series)		
2009	Avantika Hundal	Mann Kee Awaaz Pratigya		
2009	Avantika Hundal	Yeh Hai Mohabbatein		
2009	Avantika Hundal	Mose Chhal Kiye Jaaye		
2009	Sargun Mehta	12/24 Karol Bagh		
2009	Sargun Mehta	Phulwa		
2009	Sargun Mehta	Balika Vadhu		
2009	Sargun Mehta	Nach Baliye		
2009	Anushka Sen	Baalveer		
2009	Anushka Sen	Khatron Ke Khiladi 11		
2009	Ashnoor Kaur	Yeh Rishta Kya Kehlata Hai		
2009	Ashnoor Kaur	Patiala Babes		
2009	Mugdha Chaphekar	Satrangi Sasural		
2009	Mugdha Chaphekar	Kumkum Bhagya		
2009	Supriya Kumari	Bairi Piya (TV series)		
2009	Meghna Malik	Na Aana Is Des Laado		
2009	Natasha Sharma	Na Aana Is Des Laado		
2009	Pooja Gor	Mann Kee Awaaz Pratigya		
2009	Aasiya Kazi	Dharampatni		
2010	Yukti Kapoor	Pyaar Ka Dard Hai Meetha Meetha Pyaara Pyaara		
2010	Yukti Kapoor	Agnifera		
2010	Yukti Kapoor	Siya Ke Ram		
2010	Yukti Kapoor	Balika Vadhu		
2010	Yukti Kapoor	Maddam Sir		
2010	Yukti Kapoor	Keh Doon Tumhein		
2010	Nia Sharma	Kaali – Ek Agnipariksha		
2010	Nia Sharma	Ek Hazaaron Mein Meri Behna Hai		
2010	Nia Sharma	Jamai Raja (2014 TV series)		
2010	Nia Sharma	Ishq Mein Marjawan		
2010	Nia Sharma	Naagin (2015 TV series)		
2010	Nia Sharma	Khatron Ke Khiladi 8		
2010	Surbhi Jyoti	Qubool Hai		
2010	Surbhi Jyoti	Pyaar Tune Kya Kiya (TV series)		
2010	Surbhi Jyoti	Naagin (2015 TV series)		
2010	Surbhi Jyoti	Ishqbaaaz		
2010	Surbhi Jyoti	Koi Laut Ke Aaya Hai		
2010	Helly Shah	Swaragini – Jodein Rishton Ke Sur		
2010	Helly Shah	Jhalak Dikhhla Jaa season 9		
2010	Helly Shah	Devanshi (TV series)		
2010	Helly Shah	Sufiyana Pyaar Mera		
2010	Helly Shah	Ishq Mein Marjawan 2		
2010	Jannat Zubair Rahmani	Phulwa		
2010	Jannat Zubair Rahmani	Matti Ki Banno		
2010	Jannat Zubair Rahmani	Tu Aashiqui		
2010	Jannat Zubair Rahmani	Aap Ke Aa Jane Se		
2010	Jannat Zubair Rahmani	Khatron Ke Khiladi 12		
2010	Dipika Kakar	Sasural Simar Ka		
2010	Dipika Kakar	Nach Baliye 8		
2010	Dipika Kakar	Bigg Boss 12		
2010	Dipika Kakar	Kahaan Hum Kahaan Tum		
2010	Reem Shaikh	Chakravartin Ashoka Samrat		
2010	Reem Shaikh	Tujhse Hai Raabta		
2010	Reem Shaikh	Fanaa: Ishq Mein Marjawan		
2010	Reem Shaikh	Tere Ishq Mein Ghayal		
2010	Devoleena Bhattacharjee	Saath Nibhaana Saathiya		
2010	Devoleena Bhattacharjee	Bigg Boss 13		
2010	Devoleena Bhattacharjee	Dil Diyaan Gallaan		
2010	Niti Taylor	Kaisi Yeh Yaariaan		
2010	Niti Taylor	Ishqbaaaz		
2010	Niti Taylor	Bade Achhe Lagte Hain 2		
2010	Anjum Fakih	Tere Sheher Mein		
2010	Anjum Fakih	Kundali Bhagya		
2010	Avneet Kaur	Dance India Dance Li'l Masters		
2010	Avneet Kaur	Chandra Nandini		
2010	Avneet Kaur	Aladdin - Naam Toh Suna Hoga		
2010	Giaa Manek	Saath Nibhaana Saathiya		
2010	Giaa Manek	Jeannie Aur Juju		
2010	Rucha Hasabnis	Saath Nibhaana Saathiya		
2010	Pratyusha Banerjee	Balika Vadhu		
2010	Anupriya Kapoor	Tere Liye		
2011	Soumya Seth	Navya..Naye Dhadkan Naye Sawaal		
2011	Mayuri Deshmukh	Imlie		
2011	Deepika Singh	Diya Aur Baati Hum		
2011	Loveleen Kaur Sasan	Saath Nibhaana Saathiya		
2011	Jayashree Venketaramanan	Na Bole Tum Na Maine Kuch Kaha 2		
2011	Jayashree Venketaramanan	Beend Banoongaa Ghodi Chadhunga		
2011	Dolphin Dwivedi	Udaan Sapnon Ki		
2011	Dolphin Dwivedi	Tu Aashiqui		
2011	Esha Kansara	Zindagi Mere Ghar Aana		
2011	Anchal Sahu	Ek Hazaaron Mein Meri Behna Hai		
2011	Anchal Sahu	Begusarai		
2011	Anchal Sahu	Lajwanti		
2011	Anchal Sahu	Barrister Babu		
2011	Anchal Sahu	Parineetii		
2011	Jasmin Bhasin	Tashan-E-Ishq		
2011	Jasmin Bhasin	Dil Se Dil Tak		
2011	Jasmin Bhasin	Dil Toh Happy Hai Ji		
2012	Tejasswi Prakash	Swaragini - Jodein Rishton Ke Sur		
2012	Tejasswi Prakash	Karn Sangini		
2012	Tejasswi Prakash	Rishta Likhenge Hum Naya		
2012	Tejasswi Prakash	Pehredaar Piya Ki		
2012	Tejasswi Prakash	Khatron Ke Khiladi 10		
2012	Tejasswi Prakash	Bigg Boss 15		
2012	Tejasswi Prakash	Naagin 6		
2012	Mansi Srivastava	Do Dil Bandhe Ek Dori Se		
2012	Mansi Srivastava	Sasural Simar Ka		
2012	Mansi Srivastava	Divya Drishti		
2012	Mansi Srivastava	Ishqbaaaz		
2012	Mansi Srivastava	Dil Boley Oberoi		
2012	Mansi Srivastava	Kundali Bhagya		
2012	Shrenu Parikh	Iss Pyaar Ko Kya Naam Doon? Ek Baar Phir		
2012	Shrenu Parikh	Ishqbaaaz		
2012	Shrenu Parikh	Dil Boley Oberoi		
2012	Shrenu Parikh	Ek Bhram Sarvagun Sampanna		
2012	Shrenu Parikh	Maitree		
2012	Ekta Kaul	Rab Se Sohna Isshq		
2012	Ekta Kaul	Jhalak Dikhhla Jaa 6		
2012	Ekta Kaul	Bade Achhe Lagte Hain		
2012	Ekta Kaul	Yeh Hai Aashiqui		
2012	Ekta Kaul	Mere Angne Mein		
2012	Disha Parmar	Pyaar Ka Dard Hai Meetha Meetha Pyaara Pyaara		
2012	Disha Parmar	Woh Apna Sa		
2012	Disha Parmar	Bade Achhe Lagte Hain 2		
2012	Disha Parmar	Bade Achhe Lagte Hain 3		
2012	Akshita Mudgal	Yeh Moh Moh Ke Dhaagey		
2012	Akshita Mudgal	Bhakharwadi		
2012	Akshita Mudgal	Ishk Par Zor Nahi		
2012	Akshita Mudgal	Iss Mod Se Jaate Hain		
2012	Gulki Joshi	Piya Rangrezz		
2012	Gulki Joshi	Piyaa Albela		
2012	Gulki Joshi	Maddam Sir		
2012	Gulki Joshi	Paramavatar Shri Krishna		
2012	Gulki Joshi	Vanshaj		
2012	Aalisha Panwar	Begusarai		
2012	Aalisha Panwar	Ishq Mein Marjawan		
2012	Aalisha Panwar	Meri Gudiya		
2012	Aalisha Panwar	Teri Meri Ikk Jindri		
2012	Aalisha Panwar	Kumkum Bhagya		
2012	Aneri Vajani	Nisha Aur Uske Cousins		
2012	Aneri Vajani	Beyhadh		
2012	Aneri Vajani	Anupamaa		
2013	Shivangi Joshi	Begusarai		
2013	Shivangi Joshi	Yeh Rishta Kya Kehlata Hai		
2013	Shivangi Joshi	Balika Vadhu 2		
2013	Shivangi Joshi	Barsatein - Mausam Pyaar Ka		
2013	Shivangi Verma			
2013	Shivangi Verma	Nach Baliye 6		
2013	Shivangi Verma	TV Biwi Aur Main		
2013	Amrapali Gupta	Qubool Hai		
2013	Toral Rasputra	Balika Vadhu		
2013	Harshita Gaur	Sadda Haq		
2013	Preetika Rao	Beintehaa		
2013	Shiny Doshi	Sarojini - Ek Nayi Pehal		
2013	Shiny Doshi	Saraswatichandra		
2013	Shiny Doshi	Khatron Ke Khiladi 8		
2013	Shiny Doshi	Bahu Hamari Rajni Kant		
2013	Shiny Doshi	Pandya Store		
2013	Jiya Shankar	Pyaar Tune Kya Kiya		
2013	Jiya Shankar	Meri Hanikarak Biwi		
2013	Jiya Shankar	Kaatelal & Sons		
2013	Jiya Shankar	Pishachini		
2013	Erica Fernandes	Kuch Rang Pyar Ke Aise Bhi		
2013	Erica Fernandes	Kasautii Zindagii Kay 2		
2013	Erica Fernandes	Kuch Rang Pyar Ke Aise Bhi:Nayi Kahani		
2013	Ketki Kadam	Qubool Hai		
2013	Ketki Kadam	Mahabharat (2013)		
2013	Ketki Kadam	Rang Jaun Tere Rang Mein		
2014	Sumbul Touqeer	Jodha Akbar		
2014	Sumbul Touqeer	Waaris (2016 TV series)		
2014	Sumbul Touqeer	Chandragupta Maurya (2018 TV series)		
2014	Sumbul Touqeer	Ishaaron Ishaaron Mein		
2014	Sumbul Touqeer	Imlie		
2014	Sumbul Touqeer	Ravivaar With Star Parivaar		
2014	Sumbul Touqeer	Bigg Boss (Hindi season 16)		
2014	Sumbul Touqeer	Kavya – Ek Jazbaa, Ek Junoon		
2014	Sanjeeda Sheikh	Kyaa Hoga Nimmo Kaa		
2014	Sanjeeda Sheikh	Kayamath		
2014	Sanjeeda Sheikh	Nach Baliye 3		
2014	Sanjeeda Sheikh	Ek Hasina Thi		
2014	Sanjeeda Sheikh	Kya Dil Mein Hai		
2014	Pankhuri Awasthy	Razia Sultan		
2014	Pankhuri Awasthy	Suryaputra Karn		
2014	Pankhuri Awasthy	Kya Qusoor Hai Amala Ka?		
2014	Pankhuri Awasthy	Yeh Rishta Kya Kehlata Hai		
2014	Aditi Rathore	Kumkum Bhagya		
2014	Aditi Rathore	Ek Duje Ke Vaaste		
2014	Aditi Rathore	Naamkarann		
2014	Aditi Rathore	Aapki Nazron Ne Samjha		
2014	Aditi Rathore	Aangan – Aapno Kaa		
2014	Meera Deosthale	Sasural Simar Ka		
2014	Meera Deosthale	Udaan		
2014	Meera Deosthale	Vidya		
2014	Meera Deosthale	Gud Se Meetha Ishq		
2014	Aishwarya Khare	Jaane Kya Hoga Rama Re		
2014	Aishwarya Khare	Vishkanya Ek Anokhi Prem Kahani		
2014	Aishwarya Khare	Yeh Hai Chahatein		
2014	Aishwarya Khare	Bhagya Lakshmi		
2014	Rhea Sharma	Itna Karo Na Mujhe Pyaar		
2014	Rhea Sharma	Tu Sooraj Main Saanjh, Piyaji		
2014	Rhea Sharma	Yeh Rishtey Hain Pyaar Ke		
2014	Shivya Pathania	Humsafars		
2014	Shivya Pathania	Ek Rishta Saajhedari Ka		
2014	Shivya Pathania	Dil Dhoondta Hai		
2014	Shivya Pathania	RadhaKrishn		
2014	Shivya Pathania	Vikram Betaal Ki Rahasya Gatha		
2014	Shivya Pathania	Ram Siya Ke Luv Kush		
2014	Shivya Pathania	Baal Shiv – Mahadev Ki Andekhi Gatha		
2014	Shivya Pathania	Teri Meri Doriyaann		
2014	Palak Purswani	MTV Spitsvilla		
2015	Aishwarya Sharma	Meri Durga		
2015	Aishwarya Sharma	Ghum Hai Kisikey Pyaar Meiin		
2015	Aishwarya Sharma	Khatron Ke Khiladi 13		
2015	Aishwarya Sharma	Bigg Boss 17		
2015	Shagun Sharma	Tu Aashiqui		
2015	Shagun Sharma	Ishk Par Zor Nahi		
2015	Shagun Sharma	Sasural Genda Phool 2		
2015	Shagun Sharma	Harphoul Mohini		
2015	Shagun Sharma	Yeh Hai Chahatein		
2015	Sana Sayyad	Divya Drishti		
2015	Sana Sayyad	Lockdown Ki Love Story		
2015	Sana Sayyad	Spy Bahu		
2015	Sana Sayyad	Kundali Bhagya		
2015	Kanika Mann	Badho Bahu		
2015	Kanika Mann	Guddan Tumse Na Ho Payega		
2015	Kanika Mann	Khatron Ke Khiladi 12		
2015	Kanika Mann	Chand Jalne Laga		
2015	Eisha Singh	Ishq Ka Rang Safed		
2015	Eisha Singh	Ishq Subhan Allah		
2015	Eisha Singh	Sirf Tum		
2015	Eisha Singh	Bekaboo		
2015	Eisha Singh	Bigg Boss 18		
2015	Mallika Singh	Janbaaz Sindbad		
2015	Mallika Singh	RadhaKrishn		
2015	Mallika Singh	Jai Kanhaiya Lal Ki		
2015	Krissann Barretto	Kaisi Yeh Yaariaan		
2015	Krissann Barretto	Sasural Simar Ka		
2015	Krissann Barretto	Tu Aashiqui		
2015	Bhavika Sharma	Maddam Sir		
2015	Bhavika Sharma	Jiji Maa		
2015	Bhavika Sharma	Ghum Hai Kisikey Pyaar Meiin		
2015	Donal Bisht	Ek Deewaana Tha		
2015	Donal Bisht	Roop - Mard Ka Naya Swaroop		
2016	Srishti Jain	Suhani Si Ek Ladki		
2016	Srishti Jain	Meri Durga		
2016	Srishti Jain	Main Mayke Chali Jaungi		
2016	Srishti Jain	Hamari Wali Good News		
2016	Srishti Jain	Bade Achhe Lagte Hain 3		
2016	Chahat Pandey	Hamari Bahu Silk		
2016	Chahat Pandey	Dwarkadheesh Bhagwan Shree Krishn – Sarvkala Sampann		
2016	Chahat Pandey	Durga – Mata Ki Chhaya		
2016	Chahat Pandey	Nath – Zewar Ya Zanjeer		
2016	Chahat Pandey	Bigg Boss 18		
2016	Ridhima Pandit	Bahu Hamari Rajni Kant		
2016	Ridhima Pandit	Khatron Ke Khiladi 9		
2016	Ridhima Pandit	Haiwaan : The Monster		
2016	Debattama Saha	Shaurya Aur Anokhi Ki Kahani		
2016	Debattama Saha	Ishaaron Ishaaron Mein		
2016	Debattama Saha	Mithai		
2016	Tanvi Dogra	Ek Bhram...Sarvagun Sampanna		
2016	Tanvi Dogra	Jiji Maa		
2016	Tanvi Dogra	Parineetii		
2016	Samiksha Jaiswal	Zindagi Ki Mehek		
2016	Samiksha Jaiswal	Bahu Bagum		
2016	Niyati Fatnani	Nazar		
2016	Niyati Fatnani	Channa Mereya		
2016	Shivani Surve	Jaana Na Dil Se Door		
2017	Anjali Anand	Dhhai Kilo Prem		
2017	Anjali Anand	Kullfi Kumarr Bajewala		
2017	Anjali Anand	Khatron Ke Khiladi (TV series)		
2017	Anjali Anand	Jhalak Dikhhla Jaa 11		
2017	Kaveri Priyam	Yeh Rishtey Hain Pyaar Ke		
2017	Kaveri Priyam	Ziddi Dil Maane Na		
2017	Kaveri Priyam	Dil Diyaan Gallaan		
2017	Sargun Kaur Luthra	Kaal Bhairav Rahasya		
2017	Sargun Kaur Luthra	Tantra		
2017	Sargun Kaur Luthra	Yeh Hai Chahatein		
2017	Ashi Singh	Yeh Un Dinon Ki Baat Hai		
2017	Ashi Singh	Meet: Badlegi Duniya Ki Reet		
2018	Amandeep Sidhu	Tantra		
2018	Amandeep Sidhu	Teri Meri Ikk Jindri		
2018	Amandeep Sidhu	Choti Sarrdaarni		
2018	Amandeep Sidhu	Chashni		
2018	Amandeep Sidhu	Saubhagyavati Bhava: * Niyam Aur Shartein Laagu		
2018	Riya Sharma	Pinjara Khubsurti Ka		
2018	Riya Sharma	Kashibai Bajirao Ballal		
2018	Riya Sharma	Banni Chow Home Delivery		
2018	Riya Sharma	Dhruv Tara - Samay Sadi Se Pare		
2018	Pranali Rathod	Barrister Babu		
2018	Pranali Rathod	Kyun Utthe Dil Chhod Aaye		
2018	Pranali Rathod	Yeh Rishta Kya Kehlata Hai		
2018	Megha Chakraborty	Krishna Chali London		
2018	Megha Chakraborty	Kaatelal & Sons		
2018	Megha Chakraborty	Imlie		
2018	Anjali Tatrari	Mere Dad Ki Dulhan		
2018	Anjali Tatrari	Tere Bina Jiya Jaye Na		
2018	Anjali Tatrari	Vanshaj		
2019	Shehnaaz Gill	Bigg Boss 13		
2019	Shehnaaz Gill	Mujhe Shaadi Karoge		
2019	Nimrit Kaur Ahluwalia	Choti Sarrdaarni		
2019	Nimrit Kaur Ahluwalia	Bigg Boss 16		
2019	Aditi Sanwal	Baalveer		
2019	Aditi Sanwal	Deewani		
2019	Shruti Sharma	Gathbandhan		
2019	Shruti Sharma	Namak Issk Ka		
2020	Madalsa Sharma Chakraborty	Anupamaa		
2020	Pratibha Ranta	Qurbaan Hua		
2021	Aetashaa Sansgiri	Punyashlok Ahilyabai		
2021	Sonia Rathee	Broken But Beautiful; Decoupled		
2021	Neha Rana	Junooniyatt		
2021	Neha Rana	Megha Barsenge		
2022	Adrija Roy	Durga Aur Charu		
2022	Adrija Roy	Imlie		
2022	Adrija Roy	Kundali Bhagya		
2022	Samridhii Shukla	Saavi Ki Savaari		
2022	Samridhii Shukla	Yeh Rishta Kya Kehlata Hai		
2022	Rachi Sharma	Woh Toh Hai Albelaa		
2022	Rachi Sharma	Kumkum Bhagya		

== See also ==
- List of Hindi television actors
- List of Indian television actresses
- List of Hindi film actresses

== Bibliography ==
=== References ===
- ABP News staff (14 October 2015). "Top 5 Highest Paid Indian Television Actresses". ABP News. Archived from the original on 15 February 2017.
- Express, The Indian: OCLC 1113321837 (all editions).
1. Express Web Desk (1 December 2016). "From Kapil Sharma to Sriti Jha, Here's What TV's Top Stars Earn". Archived from the original on 5 December 2016.
2. Express Web Desk (18 September 2016). "11 Television Stars Who Earn More than Bollywood Actors per Month!". The Indian Express. Archived from the original on 25 September 2016.
- The Times Group:
1. Times of India. Mumbai. ISSN 0971-8257; OCLC 23379369 (all editions).
  1. Times of India (19 February 2017). "Top Actress by The Times of India". Archived from the original on 20 February 2017.
  2. Times of India (5 April 2017). "These TV Actresses Are More Popular Than Our Bollywood Heroines". Archived from the original on 4 September 2023.
  3. Times of India (14 July 2017). "Jennifer Winget to Hina Khan: TV's Highest Paid Actors". Archived from the original on 4 June 2018.
2. MensXP. Delhi. OCLC 854909009 (all editions).
  1. Roy, Deb (11 September 2014) [Updated September 1, 2023]. "List of Top 35 Hottest TV Actresses in India". Archived from the original on 2 October 2022.
