= Dr. Aarambhi =

Indian medical melodrama television series

- Genre: Romance; Medical; Melodrama
- Created by: Mukta Dhond
- Inspired by: Doctor Cha by Jung Yeo-rang
- Directed by: Shubham Upadyay; Sohail R Khan
- Creative directors: Jaspreet Kaur Saluja; Nikki Agarwal
- Starring: Aishwarya Khare; Arjit Taneja; Aditya Redij; Anjum Fakih
- Country of origin: India
- Original language: Hindi
- No. of seasons: 1
- No. of episodes: 245

Production
- Producers: Mukta Dhond; Milind Dhond
- Production location: Film City, Mumbai
- Cinematography: Hrishikesh Gandhi
- Camera setup: Multi-camera
- Running time: 20 minutes
- Production company: Malhar Content Creations

Original release
- Network: Colors TV
- Release: 27 January 2026 – present

Dr. Aarambhi is an Indian Hindi-language romantic family drama television series that premiered on Colors TV on 27 January 2026 and streams digitally on JioHotstar. Produced by Mukta Dhond under Malhar Content Creations, starring Aishwarya Khare in the titular role with Arjit Taneja, Aditya Redij and Anjum Fakih. The series is loose adaptation of the K-drama, Doctor Cha.

== Plot ==
Dr. Aarambhi Chaudhary is a brilliant gold medallist and AIPMT topper, stands at the threshold of a promising medical career when she chooses to set it aside after marriage. Devoting herself entirely to her new family, she embraces the roles of dutiful daughter-in-law, supportive wife and caring mother, quietly shelving her own ambitions to nurture her household.

As the years pass, Aarambhi's husband, Dr. Vishwas Tandon rises to prominence as the celebrated face of their medical legacy, while Aarambhi's sacrifices remain unseen. The fragile balance of her life shatters when she discovers his affair with Dr. Avantika Mehta. Confronted by betrayal and emotional manipulation, Aarambhi is forced to reevaluate the choices that defined her identity. Refusing to remain in the shadows any longer, she resolves to reclaim her independence, return to medicine, and rebuild her life on her own terms.

== Cast ==
=== Main ===
- Aishwarya Khare as Dr. Aarambhi Chaudhary: Balbir and Manju's daughter; Arun's sister; Vishwas's estranged ex-wife; Dhruv's love interest; Vihaan's mother (2026–present)
- Aditya Redij as Dr. Vishwas Tandon: Co-owner of NeoPulse Hospital; Sunil and Dimple's elder son; Dhruv's estranged half brother; Raj's estranged brother; Aarambhi's estranged ex-husband; Avantika's lover; Vihaan and Sania's father (2026–present)
- Anjum Fakih as Dr. Avantika Mehta: Vishwas's lover; Sania's mother (2026–present)
- Arjit Taneja as Dhruv Tandon aka DC Chawla: Sonam and Sunil's estranged eldest son; Dimple's estranged step-son; Vishwas and Raj's half-brother; Aarambhi's love interest (2026–present)

=== Recurring ===
- Bhuvnesh Shetty as Balbir Chaudhary: Manju's husband; Aarambhi and Arun's father; Vihaan's grandfather (2026–present)
- Jyoti Joshi as Manju Chaudhary: Balbir's wife; Aarambhi and Arun's mother; Vihaan's grandmother (2026–present)
- Preetish Manas as Arun Chaudhary: Balbir and Manju's son; Aarambhi's brother (2026–present)
- Shailesh Datar as Dr. Sunil Tandon: Harish's elder brother; Sonam and Dimple's husband; Dhruv, Vishwas and Raj's father; Vihaan and Sania's grandfather (2026–present)
- Neelam Pathania Abrol as Sonam Tandon: Sunil's frist wife; Dhruv's mother (2026–present)
- Lubna Salim as Dimple Tandon: Sunil's second wife; Vishwas and Raj's mother; Dhruv's estranged step-mother; Vihaan and Sania's grandmother (2026–present)
- Israil Ghanchi as Vihaan Tandon: Vishwas and Aarambhi's son; Sania's half-brother (2026–present)
- Aria Sakaria as Sania Mehta: Avantika and Vishwas's daughter; Vihaan's half-sister (2026–present)
- Abhishek Verma as Dr. Raj Tandon: Sunil and Dimple's estranged younger son; Vishwas's estranged brother; Dhruv's half brother; Aarambhi's well wisher (2026–present)
- Mehul Nisar as Dr. Harish "Harry" Tandon: Sunil's younger brother; Nandita's husband (2026–present)
- Meera Sarang as Nandita Tandon: Harish's wife (2026–present)
- Sumit Singh/Deepa Rao as Dr. Manmeet Arora: Aarambhi's colleague, donor and well wisher; Raj's love interest (2026)/(2026–present)
- Neena Cheema as Kunika Chawla: Co-owner and trustee of NeoPulse Hospital; Dhruv's grandmother; Aarambhi's well wisher (2026–present)
- Rohit Mehta as Dev Malhotra: Siya's husband; Nyra's father (2026)
- Mohini Sapnani as Nyra Malhotra: Dev's daughter; Raj's ex-fiancée (2026)
- Jayati Narula as Radhika: Aarambhi's friend (2026)
- Ankit Khare as Sunny Arora: Manmeet's ex-husband (2026)

=== Special appearances ===
- Ayesha Singh as Mannat Khanna Saxena Saluja from Mannat – Har Khushi Paane Ki (2026)
- Adnan Khan as Aman Kumar/Vikrant Saluja from Mannat – Har Khushi Paane Ki (2026)
- Mona Vasu as Sonia "Aishwarya" Khanna Raisingh from Mannat – Har Khushi Paane Ki (2026)
- Sharain Khanduja as Mallika Raisingh from Mannat – Har Khushi Paane Ki (2026)
- Aditi Sharma as Preeti Arora from Shayad Yahi Hai Pyaar (2026)

== Production ==
=== Casting ===
In December 2025, Anjum Fakih was announced enter the series as Dr. Avantika. Aishwarya Khare was signed to play the titular role, Dr. Aarambhi. In April, Sumit Singh portraying Dr. Manmeet was replaced without prior notice. Arjit Taneja entered the show in May 2026 to portray Dhruv.

=== Release ===
The series was confirmed release on 27 January 2026 with the tagline, “Bahut hua setback, ab hoga comeback.”

=== Ratings ===
Week	Year	BARC Viewership		Ref.
Week	Year	TRP	Ranking	Ref.
Week 08	2026	1.2	16	
Week 22	2026	1.2	13	
Week 23	2026	1.1	16	

== Awards and nominations ==
Year	Award	Category	Recipient	Result	Ref.
2026	Indian Television Academy Awards	Best Supporting Actor - Drama - TV	Abhishek Verma	Pending	
2026	Indian Television Academy Awards	Best Negative Performance - TV	Lubna Salim	Pending	
2026	Indian Television Academy Awards	Best DOP - TV	Hrishikesh Gandhi	Pending	
