= Ayesha Singh =

Indian actress

- Born: 19 June 1996 (age 30); Mumbai, Maharashtra, India
- Education: SNDT Women's University Law School
- Known for: Ghum Hai Kisikey Pyaar Meiin; Mannat – Har Khushi Paane Ki

Ayesha Singh (born 19 June 1996) is an Indian actress who primarily works in Hindi television. Singh is best known for her portrayal as Sai Joshi in Star Plus's Ghum Hai Kisikey Pyaar Meiin and Mannat Khanna Saxena Saluja in Mannat – Har Khushi Paane Ki.

== Early life ==
Ayesha Singh was born on 19 June 1996 in Mumbai. She completed her schooling from St.Patrick Junior College in Agra. She completed Bachelor of Laws from SNDT Women's University. Singh then completed her course in Acting from Anupam Kher's acting school.

== Career ==
Ayesha Singh made her acting debut in 2015 with Doli Armaano Ki She portrayed a minor role of Ratti Sinhain few episodes of the show. In the same year, she portrayed Amy D'Costain Zindagi Abhi Baaki Hai Mere Ghost. She then portrayed Reenain a crowd-funded movie Adrishya, which was released in 2018.

From October 2020 to May 2023, Singh is seen portraying Sai Joshi in Ghum Hai Kisikey Pyaar Meiinopposite Neil Bhatt and Harshad Arora. She received Indian Telly Awards for Most Promising Actress Bollywood Life's Best Actress award, International Iconic Awards for Best Actress for her performance in 2023.

In 2022, Singh reprised Sai Joshi in the game show Ravivaar With Star Parivaar. In the same year, she made her debut in music video with Bidaai sung by Yashita Sharma.

From January 2025 to October 2026, Singh playing the role of Mannat Khanna in Colors TV's Mannat – Har Khushi Paane Ki.

== Media image ==
In 2021 and 2022, Singh was placed in Eastern Eye's "Top 50 Asian Stars" list. Singh was also placed in Eastern Eye's "30 under 30 Asians" list.

== Filmography ==
=== Films ===
Year	Title	Role	Notes
2018	Adrishya	Reena	

=== Television ===
Year	Title	Role	Notes	Ref
2015	Doli Armaano Ki	Ratti Sinha	Episode 323	
2015	Zindagi Abhi Baaki Hai Mere Ghost	Amy D'Costa		
2020–2023	Ghum Hai Kisikey Pyaar Meiin	Sai Joshi	Main role	
2025–2026	Mannat – Har Khushi Paane Ki	Mannat Khanna Saxena Saluja	Main role	

=== Special appearances ===
Year	Title	Role	Ref
2022	Kabhi Kabhie Ittefaq Sey	Sai Joshi	
2022	Ravivaar With Star Parivaar	Sai Joshi	
2023	Teri Meri Doriyaann	Sai Joshi	
2026	Dr. Aarambhi	Mannat Khanna Saxena Saluja	

=== Music videos ===
Year	Title	Singer	Ref
2022	Bidaai	Yashita Sharma	

== Awards and nominations ==
Year	Award	Category	Work	Result	Ref
2022	21st Indian Television Academy Awards	Best Actress (Drama)	Ghum Hai Kisikey Pyaar Meiin	Nominated	
2023	Indian Telly Awards	Most Promising Actress	Ghum Hai Kisikey Pyaar Meiin	Won	

== See also ==
- List of Hindi television actresses
- List of Indian television actresses
