= Bhavika Sharma =

Indian television actress

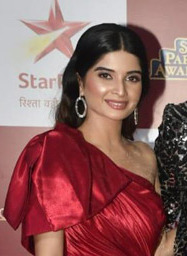
- Sharma in 2023
- Born: 5 August 1998 (age 28); Mumbai, Maharashtra, India
- Occupations: Actress; Model
- Years active: 2015–present
- Known for: Jiji Maa; Maddam Sir; Ghum Hai Kisikey Pyaar Mein; Seher – Hone Ko Hai

Bhavika Sharma (born 5 August 1998) is an Indian actress who primarily works in Hindi television. Sharma is best known for her roles in Jiji Maa, Maddam Sir and Ghum Hai Kisikey Pyaar Meiin. She was last seen playing the lead role in Colors TV's Seher – Hone Ko Hai.

== Early life ==
Bhavika Sharma was born on 5 August 1998 in Mumbai, Maharashtra. She has been fond of acting since childhood and started working in television shows at the age of 17.

== Career ==
Bhavika Sharma made her debut in Parvarrish - Season 2 in 2015, portraying the character of Riya Gupta. In 2017, she portrayed the role of Niyati Purohit in Jiji Maa. Later, she was seen in Maddam Sir playing the role of Constable Santosh Sharma opposite Priyanshu Singh. She quit the show as she was not happy with the growth of her character in the show.

She made her film debut with Cookie playing the role of Minnie Kapoor. She was seen in the lead role of Savi Chavan in Ghum Hai Kisikey Pyaar Meiin opposite Shakti Arora from June 2023 to June 2024, Hitesh Bharadwaj from June 2024 to January 2025 and Param Singh from May 2025 until the show ended in July 2025. From July 2026 to November 2026, she replaced Rishita Kothari as the female lead of Dr. Seher Baig Niyazi in Colors TV's Seher – Hone Ko Hai.

== Filmography ==
=== Films ===
Year	Title	Role	Ref.
2020	Cookie	Minnie Kapoor	

=== Television ===
Year	Title	Role	Notes	Ref.
2015–2016	Parvarrish – Season 2	Riya Gupta		
2017–2019	Jiji Maa	Niyati "Bittu" Purohit Rawat	Lead role	
2019	Ye Ishq Nahin Aasaan	Moushmi	Episode 4	
2020–2022; 2023	Maddam Sir	Constable Santosh "Santu" Sharma	Lead role	
2023–2025	Ghum Hai Kisikey Pyaar Meiin	IPS Savi Chavan Thakkar	Lead role	
2026	Seher – Hone Ko Hai	Dr. Seher Baig Niyazi	Lead role	

=== Special appearances ===
Year	Title	Role	Ref.
2024, 2026	Udne Ki Aasha	Savi Chavan	
2024	Yeh Teej Badi Hai Mast Mast	Savi Chavan	
2024	Hathi Ghoda Palki Birthday Kanhaiya Lal Ki	Savi Chavan	
2024	Maati Se Bandhi Dor	Savi Chavan	
2024	Iss Ishq Ka... Rabb Rakha	Savi Chavan	
2025	Jaadu Teri Nazar – Daayan Ka Mausam	Savi Chavan	

== Awards and nominations ==
Year	Award	Category	Work	Result	Ref.
2022	Indian Television Academy Awards	Best Actress - Comedy	Maddam Sir	Nominated	
2024	Bollywood Life Awards	Best On-screen Jodi On TV	Ghum Hai Kisikey Pyaar Meiin	Won	

== See also ==
- List of Hindi television actresses
- List of Indian television actresses
