= Tumko Meri Kasam =

2025 Indian film

- Theatrical release poster
- Directed by: Vikram Bhatt
- Written by: Vikram Bhatt
- Produced by: Dr. Ajay Murdia
- Starring: Anupam Kher; Ishwak Singh; Adah Sharma; Esha Deol
- Narrated by: Vivek Oberoi
- Cinematography: Naren A Gedia
- Edited by: Kuldip Mehan
- Music by: Prateek Walia
- Production company: Indira Entertainment
- Release date: 21 March 2025
- Running time: 157 mins
- Country: India
- Language: Hindi

Tumko Meri Kasam (transl. I swear to you) is an Indian Hindi-language drama film written and directed by Vikram Bhatt, inspired by the life of Dr. Ajay Murdia, the founder of Indira IVF. The film stars Anupam Kher, Ishwak Singh, Adah Sharma, and Esha Deol in lead roles. It was released on 21 March 2025.

The film disappointed at the box office, leading to legal troubles.

== Cast ==
- Anupam Kher as Dr. Ajay Murdia
  - Ishwak Singh as Young Ajay Murdia
- Adah Sharma as Indira Murdia
- Esha Deol as Meenakshi Sharma
- Meherzan Mazda as Rajeev Khosla
- Adnan Khan as Kshitiz Murdia
- Durgesh Kumar as Kishan Khosla
- Sushant Singh as Ramnath Tripathi

== Critical reception ==
The film received mixed reviews. Ganesh Aaglave praised Kher's performance, whereas Akaka Sahani of Indian Express called the film a "messy, verbose and over-wrought drama". Rishabh Suri of Hindustan Times gave it 2.5 stars, writing that "Tumko Meri Kasam has a wafer-thin plot that fails to engage. It's a boring affair that fails to deliver on its promise." Dhaval Roy of The Times of India rated it 3 stars out of 5, praising it for its premise, emotional depth, and "strong performances", but noted that its prolonged runtime and inconsistent pacing "make it less immersive than it could have been".
