= Mannat – Har Khushi Paane Ki =

Indian drama television series

- Genre: Drama; Romance; Tragedy
- Created by: Mukta Dhond
- Written by: Lyrics: Shashank Kunwar
- Screenplay by: Shashank Kunwar; Deeptii Rawal
- Story by: Srinita Bhoumick
- Directed by: Shubham Upadyay; Sohail R Khan; Dharminder Kumar; Mampi Jana; Lovepreet; Bhagat Singh
- Creative directors: Jaspreet Kaur Saluja; Nikki Agarwal
- Starring: Ayesha Singh; Adnan Khan; Tanvi Dogra; Namik Paul
- Composer: Aashish Rego
- Country of origin: India
- Original language: Hindi
- No. of seasons: 2
- No. of episodes: 622

Production
- Executive producers: Baljeet Singh; Harbhajan Singh; Vishal Mehra
- Producers: Mukta Dhond; Rohit Pravin Patil
- Cinematography: Hrshikesh Gandhi
- Editors: Ganga kacharla Amit Singh
- Camera setup: Multi-camera
- Running time: 21–30 minutes
- Production company: Malhar Content Creations

Original release
- Network: Colors TV
- Release: 6 January 2025 – present

Mannat – Har Khushi Paane Ki (transl. A Sacred Wish – To Gain Every Single Happiness) is an Indian Hindi-language television drama series that premiered on Colors TV on 6 January 2025 and streams digitally on JioHotstar. Produced by Mukta Dhond under Malhar Content Creations, it previously starred Ayesha Singh and Adnan Khan. This series is loosely based on the Turkish drama, Cennet'in Gözyaşları, which itself is a remake of the K-drama, Tears of Heaven.

The second season airing from 27 October 2026, stars Tanvi Dogra and Namik Paul with new storyline.

== Series overview ==
Series	Episodes	Originally released	
Series	Episodes	First released	Last released
1	596	6 January 2025	26 October 2026
2	22	27 October 2026	present

== Plot ==
=== Season 1 ===
Set against the vibrant backdrop of Mumbai, the story begins 22 years ago when Mannat was abandoned by her biological mother, Sonia Khanna at Marine Drive, but was saved by a young boy, named Aman Kumar, and was taken in and raised by her maternal aunt, Shruti. Shruti and Sonia are sisters. After abandoning Mannat, Sonia had changed her name to Aishwarya and had moved to London, where she had married a businessman, named Gagan Raisingh. Due to Gagan's mistakes in business, his father, Rajendra had handed over the business and household responsibilities to Aishwarya, which had upset Gagan's mother, Keerat.

But overtime, Gagan began to see Aishwarya's actual colours and he began to drink to cope. After graduating from culinary college, Mannat now embarks on her professional journey as a chef. She lands her first job at a high-end restaurant "Mezbaani" that, is owned, by Aishwarya and her business partner, Vikrant Saluja. Unbeknownst to anyone, Mannat and Aishwarya share a deep connection. When Aishwarya discovers Mannat's disadvantaged background, and the growing bond between Mannat and Vikrant, she fires Mannat. But Vikrant sees Mannat's potential and culinary talent, re-hiring her, despite Aishwarya's opposition.

Vikrant remains oblivious to the fact that, his identity has been fabricated, he is actually Aman, who had once rescued Mannat at Marine Drive, the real Vikrant had died from an illness, when he was five years old, a tragic event that had led to Neetu to driving recklessly, resulting in an accident that, had injured Aman's parents, Bhushan and Vishaka. Instead of seeking medical help, she callously abandoned them, abducting Aman in a misguided effort to replace her late son, giving him the name Vikrant. Unable to come to terms with her loss, Neetu had constructed a new life for Aman.

Bhushan and Vishaka were eventually taken to a hospital, where Vishaka's injuries were minor, but Bhushan's were far more serious, requiring surgery for his survival. When Ronnie had learned about the incident, instead of ensuring Aman's return to his family, he chose to support Neetu's delusion, even attempting to bribe Aman's grandmother, Shusheela to prevent her from pressing charges against Neetu for her crimes and reckless actions. He had proposed buying Aman from Shusheela and also had offered to cover the costs for her son's surgery.

But despite Shusheela rejecting Ronnie's attempts to drop the charges, he had still covered the cost of Bhushan's surgery. But unfortunately, due to apparent delays in receiving care, Bhushan did not survive. Later, Shusheela had inexplicably dropped the charges against Neetu and had sold her grandson, Aman to Ronnie and Neetu for 50,000, after, which they had moved to London. The only individuals, who are aware of Aman's actual identity, aside from Neetu and Ronnie, is Ronnie's brother, Bobby and his sister-in-law, Raveena.

Ronnie is haunted, by the guilt over his inability to save Bhushan, despite covering the surgery costs, well Neetu feels remorse for her role in what she believes had led to Bhushan's death. Unbeknownst to both of them, Bhushan's death was not a direct, result of Neetu's actions, but, due to Vishaka's interference in his medical treatment to profit from the insurance claims. Vishaka, prioritizing financial gain over her husband's life, coercing Shusheela, into dropping the charges and selling Aman, by threatening her, with a false criminal charge, because the entire Kumar family were financially broke, which had led to Vishaka to value money over the welfare of her family, including Vishaka's son, Aman, who she ultimately sold to extort future funds.

Despite returning to India after being away for 22 years, Aman has no memories of his past, although fragments occasionally resurface. But Neetu has been secretly administering illegal drugs to Aman for years to suppress his memories and to conceal his actual identity.

=== Season 2 ===
Mannat Juneja runs her family's Viraat Da Dhaba and believes food is rooted in authenticity, love and memories. The dhaba is a legacy from her father, Surinder and she strives to live up to her mother's faith. Kabir Oberoi owns the upscale restaurant Mezbaani and champions precision, innovation and perfection. Adopted into a wealthy family, he is driven by ambition and loyalty, but carries guilt over a tragedy that had shattered Mannat's family.

As the dhaba's earthy warmth clashes with Mezbaani's polished style, their rivalry sparks sharp banter and a growing connection. Will their differences bring them closer or will the truths they carry tear them apart?

== Cast ==
=== Main ===
- Ayesha Singh as Mannat Khanna Saluja: Former chef in Mezbaani Restaurant; Aishwarya and Aniruddh's daughter; Shruti's adopted daughter; Mallika's half-sister; Vikrant's wife; Dua's mother (2025–2026)
- Adnan Khan as Aman "Vikrant" Saluja: Former owner of Mezbaani Restaurant; Vishaka and Bhushan's younger son; Neetu and Ronnie's adopted son; Dhairya's brother; Mallika's ex-husband; Mannat Khanna's husband; Dua's father (2025–2026)
  - Advik Singh Rana as child Aman (2025)
- Tanvi Dogra as Mannat Juneja: Owner of Virat Da Dhaba; Surendra and Jolly's second daughter; Akanksha, Tanisha, Reet and Virat's sister (2026–present)
- Namik Paul as Kabir Oberoi: Owner of Mezbaani Restaurant; Sarika and Rajinder's elder son; Karan and Manvi's brother (2026–present)

=== Recurring ===
==== Season 1 ====
- Pradeep Shukla as Rajendra Raisingh: Keerat's husband; Gagan's father; Mallika's grandfather (2025; dead)
- Roopa Divetia as Keerat Raisingh: Rajendra's widow; Gagan's mother; Mallika's grandmother (2025)
- Hasan Zaidi as Gagan Raisingh: Keerat and Rajendra's son; Aishwarya's husband; Mallika's father; Yuvi's foster grandfather (2025)
- Mona Vasu as Sonia "Aishwarya" Khanna Raisingh: Shruti's sister; Aniruddh's ex-lover; Gagan's wife; Mannat Khanna and Mallika's mother; Dua's grandmother; Yuvi's foster grandmother; Sunita, Rajendra, Bhushan and Shruti's murderer (2025–2026; dead)
- Sharain Khanduja as Mallika "Malla" Raisingh: Aishwarya and Gagan's daughter; Mannat Khanna's half-sister; Vikrant's ex-wife; Yuvi's foster mother (2025–2026)
- Lakshit Chhabra as Yuvraj "Yuvi" Raisingh: Mallika's foster son (2025–2026)
- Rushad Rana as Ronnie Saluja: Bobby's brother; Neetu's widower; Vikrant's foster father; Dua's foster grandfather (2025–2026)
- Swati Anand as Neetu Saluja: Ronnie's wife; Vikrant's foster mother; Dua's foster grandmother (2025–2026; dead)
- Ashu Sharma as Bobby Saluja: Ronnie's brother; Raveena's husband; Puneet and Anisha's father; Shalini's rapist (2025)
- Janvi Vora as Raveena Saluja: Bobby's wife; Puneet and Anisha's mother (2025)
- Abeer Singh Godhwani as Puneet Saluja: Bobby and Raveena's son; Anisha's brother (2025)
- Aparna Mishra as Anisha "Anu" Saluja: Bobby and Raveena's daughter; Puneet's sister (2025)
- Kajal Khanchandani as Susheela Kumar: Bhushan's mother; Dhairya and Vikrant's grandmother; Dua's great grandmother (2025)
- Neha Prajapati as Vishaka Kumar: Bhushan's widow and murderer; Dhairya and Vikrant's mother; Dua's grandmother; Susheela and Shruti's murderer (2025–2026)
- Manit Joura as DCP Dhairya Kumar: Vishakha and Bhushan's elder son; Vikrant's brother; Dua's uncle and foster father; Neetu and Yashika's murderer (2025–2026)
- Yami Khandelwal / Trisha Sharda as Dua Saluja: Mannat Khanna and Vikrant's daughter; Dhairya's foster daughter (2025-2026) / (2026)
  - Shrish Todankar as baby Dua (2026)
- Puneet Tejwani as Ankit Rajvansh: Samragyi's brother-in-law and lover (2026)
- Amrapali Gupta as Samragyi Rajvansh: Manyata's elder sister; Ankit's lover; Aishwarya's murderer (2026)
- Shikha Pandey as Manyata Rajvansh: Samragyi's younger sister; Vikrant's savior turned one-sided obsessive love interest (2026; dead)
- Mamata Verma as Shruti Khanna: Aishwarya's sister; Mannat Khanna's aunt and foster mother (2025; dead)
- Sanjay Swaraj as Aniruddh Saxena: Aishwarya's ex-lover; Mannat Khanna's father; Dua's grandfather (2025)
- Leena Jumani as Yashika: Akshay's sister; Vikrant's ex-fiancée, one-sided love interest and well wisher; Yuvi's caretaker (2025–2026; dead)
- Deepa Rao as Shalini Sirohi: Aishwarya's former PA; Aditya's sister; Mannat Khanna's best friend (2025)
- Aditya Solanki as Aditya Sirohi: Shalini's brother (2025)
- Bhavya Shinde as Varun: Anirudh's right hand and assistant; Mannat's well wisher; Rajendra's false murderer (2025)
- Delnaaz Irani as Harneet Singh: Shruti's best friend (2025)
- Gulshan Shivani as Laksh: A chef of Mezbaani; Mannat's former mean co-worker turned friend (2025)
- Sapan Gulati as Derek: A chef of Mezbaani; Mannat's former mean co-worker turned friend (2025)
- Hiral Jain as Sunita: Servant of the Saluja mansion; Mannat Khanna's fake mother (2025)
- Kimmi Sharma as Dolly: Kandan's daughter (2025)
- Niyati Karnawat as Gudiya: Kandan's daughter (2025)
- Puja Kshatriya as Kandan: Shruti and Mannat Khanna's former neighbour (2025)
- Samrat Kapoor as Bunty Sandhu: Guddi's son; Dua's best friend (2025–2026)
- Abhiannshu Vohra as Akshay: Yashika's brother (2025)
- Pankaj Bijlani as Nikhil: Anisha's fiancé (2025)
- Rashmikant Surve as Pintu: Shruti and Mannat Khanna's former neighbour (2025)
- Rayees Khan as Kumar: Vikrant's personal assistant (2026)
- V S Prince Ratan as Vikrant's assistant (2025)

==== Season 2 ====
- Kishori Shahane as Sarika Oberoi: Rajinder's wife; Kabir, Karan and Manvi's mother (2026–present)
- Bobby Parvez as Rajinder Oberoi: Sarika's husband; Kabir, Karan and Manvi's father (2026–present)
- Vikram Bham as Karan Oberoi: Sarika and Rajinder's younger son; Kabir and Manvi's brother; Tanisha's husband (2026–present)
- Mousumi Debnath as Manvi Oberoi: Sarika and Rajinder's daughter; Kabir and Karan's sister (2026–present)
- Jignesh Joshi as Manjit Oberoi: Rajinder's younger brother; Meena's husband; Suraj's father (2026–present)
- Ashita Dhawan as Meena Oberoi: Manjit's wife; Suraj's mother (2026–present)
- Zaigum Hussain as Suraj Oberoi: Meena and Manjit's son (2026–present)
- Supriya Shukla as Jolly Juneja: Surendra's wife; Akansha, Mannat Juneja, Tanisha, Reet and Virat's mother (2026–present)
- Shahab Khan as Surendra Juneja: Seema's brother; Jolly's husband; Akansha, Mannat Juneja, Tanisha, Reet and Virat's father (2026–present)
- Akansha Sharma as Akansha Juneja Mehra: Jolly and Surendra's eldest daughter; Mannat Juneja, Tanisha, Reet and Virat's sister; Ayush's wife; Veer's mother (2026–present)
- Chandan Rai as Ayush Mehra: Akansha's husband; Veer's father (2026–present)
- Megha Prasad as Tanisha Juneja Oberoi: Jolly and Surendra's third daughter; Akansha, Mannat Juneja, Reet and Virat's sister; Karan's wife (2026–present)
- Sanchi Daundkar as Reet Juneja: Jolly and Surendra's youngest daughter; Akansha, Mannat Juneja, Tanisha and Virat's sister (2026–present)
- Hetal Yadav as Seema Dogra: Surendra's sister; Harsh's mother (2026–present)
- Rahul Patel as Harsh Dogra: Seema's son (2026–present)
- Vishal Sharma as Galaxy aka Gullu: Helper in Virat Da Dhaba (2026–present)
- Rahul Bajpai as Ajinkya (2026–present)
- Yogendra Kumeria

=== Guest ===
- Pinky Chinoy as Mrs. Burman: A food inspector (2025)
- Aishwarya Khare as Dr. Aarambhi Tandon to promote Dr. Aarambhi (2026)
- Aditya Redij as Dr. Vishwas Tandon to promote Dr. Aarambhi (2026)
- Deepika Singh as Mangal Srivastav from Mangal Lakshmi (2026)
- Arjit Taneja as Dhruv Chawla from Dr. Aarambhi (2026)

== Production ==
=== Development ===
In early December 2024, Colors TV unveiled a teaser to introduce Mannat – Har Khushi Paane Ki with Ayesha Singh and Mona Vasu.

Around September 2026, reports began circulating that the show is heading for a generation leap. But the makers opted for a second season Mannat 2.0 instead of a generation leap. Via promo released on 13 September, Tanvi Dogra and Namik Paul were roped to play the leads.

=== Casting ===
Title screen featuring Ayesha Singh and Adnan Khan

Ayesha Singh was cast as the female lead, Mannat Khanna. Adnan Khan was selected to play the male lead, Vikrant Saluja. Mona Vasu was cast as the main female antagonist, Aishwarya Raisingh. Delnaaz Irani was roped in to portray Harneet. In September 2025, Manit Joura joined the show as cop Dhariya.

In December 2025, the show took a 7 years leap where Yami Khandelwal and Lakshit Chhabra were roped in as Dua and Yuvi respectively. Leena Jumani also joined the show post leap in a pivotal role. In June 2026, Amrapali Gupta entered the show as Samragyi. Alongside her, Shikha Pandey was cast as Manyata, Samragyi's sister.

Tanvi Dogra was cast as new Mannat–Mannat Juneja and Namik Paul was signed to play male lead, Kabir Oberoi. Meanwhile, Kishore Shahane joined the show as Sarika Oberoi with Supriya Shukla portraying Jolly Juneja.

=== Crossover ===
From 25 March to 26 March 2026, Mannat had a crossover with Dr. Aarambhi.

== Awards and nominations ==
Year	Award	Category	Recipient	Result	Ref.
2026	Indian Television Academy Awards	Best Negative Performance - TV	Mona Vasu	Pending	
2026	Indian Television Academy Awards	Best Art Director - TV	Jaspreet Saluja	Pending	
