= Zindagi Abhi Baaki Hai Mere Ghost =

Indian horror comedy show

- Genre: Horror; Comedy
- Created by: Ravi M. Ojha
- Written by: Mitali Bhattacharya; Shipra Arora
- Directed by: Rakesh Kumar
- Creative director: Kajal Shah
- Starring: See below
- Country of origin: India
- Original language: Hindi
- No. of seasons: 1
- No. of episodes: 120

Production
- Producers: Mitali Bhattacharya; Romit M. Ojha
- Production locations: Mumbai, Maharashtra, India
- Cinematography: Indranil Singha
- Editor: Janak Chauhan
- Camera setup: Multi-camera
- Running time: 22 minutes approx.
- Production company: Ravi Ojha Productions

Original release
- Network: Life OK
- Release: 31 August 2015 – 12 February 2016

Zindagi Abhi Baaki Hai Mere Ghost (transl. There is Still Life Left my Ghost) is an Indian horror comedy television series, which premiered on 31 August 2015 on Life OK. The series is produced by Ravi Ojha Productions of Ravi Ojha. The storyline of the series revolves around a family of ghosts haunting a deserted house in Goa. Dhruv Raj Sharma and Kanika Kotnala have lead roles in the series.

== Plot ==
A poor fisherman named Yug, forced to take shelter in an old mansion, encounters a family of ghosts. Initially terrified, he gradually gets to know them and eventually befriends them. The ghost family in the Palekar mansion is trapped because of the person who mysteriously killed them, and they cannot find peace until they punish the culprit. Yug becomes a member of the ghost family due to his selflessness and kind heart. An orphan, he gains a beautiful family.

Yug is in love with Sophia, the daughter of Mr. D'Costa, a highly respected and wealthy man in Bastura. The ghost family mistakenly believes that D'Costa is responsible for their deaths, but it is later revealed that the true culprit is a minister named Kishore Kadam, who changed his identity through plastic surgery and is now known as Keith Adams. Sophia's stepmother is also his accomplice. By the time the ghost family confronts this truth, D'Souza has died due to Kishore's controversies.

While solving the murder mystery of D'Souza alongside the Palekar family's murder mystery, Sophia falls in love with Yug. Ultimately, when the ghost family identifies their culprit and punishes him by killing him, they finally achieve peace (mukti).

== Cast ==
- Dhruv Raj Sharma as Yug Bastora
- Kanika Kotnala as Sophia D'costa
- Smita Bansal as Radha Palekar
- Ayesha Singh as Amy D'costa
- Indraneel Bhattacharya as Suraj Palekar
- Shweta Vyas as Riya Palekar
- Anant V Joshi as Ishaan Palekar
- Tiku Talsania as Peter D'costa
- Ayub Khan as Keith Adams/Kishore Kadam
- Anita Kanwal as Dadi Ghost
- Tanaaz Irani as Veronica D'costa
- Anshuman sinha as Benjamin
- Rishi Khurana as Jaggu
