= Ek Bhram...Sarvagun Sampanna =

2019 Indian television series

- Genre: Drama; Thriller
- Created by: Dipti Kalwani
- Written by: Dipti Kalwani
- Directed by: Abinaash Sharma
- Creative director: Siddhartha Vankar
- Starring: Shrenu Parikh; Zain Imam
- Country of origin: India
- Original language: Hindi
- No. of seasons: 1
- No. of episodes: 109

Production
- Producer: Dipti Kalwani
- Camera setup: Multi-camera
- Running time: 21–23 minutes
- Production company: Sunny Side Up Films

Original release
- Network: StarPlus
- Release: 22 April – 20 September 2019

Ek Bhram...Sarvagun Sampanna is an Indian thriller drama television series that aired on StarPlus from 22 April to 20 September 2019. Produced by Sunny Side Up Films, it starred Shrenu Parikh and Zain Imam.

== Plot ==
Janhvi is the respected and accomplished ideal daughter-in-law of the rich Mittal family. Loved by everyone, her decisions are always respected. But Janhvi has a secret vengeance towards the family. PK's younger son, Kabir Mittal is an army officer who returns home after six years with the widow and son of his colleague who sacrifice his life for the nation.

Janhvi reveals herself to be Pooja Sharma, the daughter of Dr. Ashok Sharma. Ashok's house was burnt by PK Mittal. The former managed to save his daughters but died in the fire. Since then Pooja vowed to destroy the whole Mittal family. She got the entire Mittal business and property on her name and ousted the Mittal family from their home.

Thus, starts a cold war between Pooja and Kabir. Kabir kidnaps Pooja's mother and asks Pooja to marry him in order to save her mother's life. Helpless, Pooja agrees and the two get married. Slowly, the two see each other's good side thus softening towards one another. Hesitant at first, they later accept having fallen in love with each other. Evil Rani turns vengeful towards Pooja, unable to accept Kabir with someone else. Eventually, Pooja and Kabir clear through all the plotting and misunderstandings and unite.

== Cast ==
=== Main ===
- Shrenu Parikh as Pooja Kabir Mittal: Ashok and Anuradha's daughter; Rani's sister; Kabir's wife
- Zain Imam as Kabir Mittal: Suman and Prem's son; Dhruv's brother; Pooja's husband; Kavya's former husband

=== Recurring ===
- Purva Parag as Suman Mittal: Prem's wife; Kabir and Dhruv's mother
- Ayub Khan as Prem "PK" Mittal: Kishan's son; Suman's husband; Kabir and Dhruv's father
- Tanvi Dogra as Kavya Singhania: Vyom's widow; Kabir's ex-wife; Arush's mother
- Jyoti Gauba as Anuradha Sharma: Ashok's wife; Pooja and Rani's mother
- Rajeev Kumar as Suhasini "Amma" Devi: Pooja and Rani's adoptive mother
- Karan Mehra as Dr. Ashok Sharma: Anuradha's husband; Pooja and Rani's father
- Ishaan Singh Manhas as Dhruv Mittal: Suman and Prem's elder son; Kabir's brother; Pooja's fake husband
- Tina Philip as Rani "Ishani" Sharma: Ashok and Anuradha's younger daughter; Pooja's sister; Kabir's obsessed lover
- Nasir Khan as DCP: Prem's friend
- Manju Sharma as Chanda Mittal: Sonali and Jay's mother; Kabir and Dhruv's aunt
- Aanchal Agrawal as Sonali Mittal: Chanda's daughter; Jay's sister; Kabir and Dhruv's cousin
- Anshul Pandey as Jay Mittal: Chanda's son; Sonali's brother; Kabir and Dhruv's cousin
- Parikshit Sahni as Kishan Mittal: Patriarch of Mittal family; Prem's father; Kabir, Dhruv, Sonali and Jay's grandfather
- Anuj Sachdeva as Vyom Malhotra: Kabir's colleague and friend; Kavya's first husband; Arush's father
- Vidhan Sharma/Atharva Sharma as Arush Malhotra: Kavya and Vyom's son
- Manish Chawla

== Reception ==
Times Now said, "While it’s very clear in the first episode itself how twisted Janhvi is, makers keep the intrigue alive with her character. While Shrenu keeps the intrigue alive with her antics in the show, Zain’s character, Kabir, also manages to add to all the drama right before the episode ends".

The Times of India stated, "Ek Bhram – Sarvagun Sampanna will keep you hooked to the show with Janhvi’s mysterious unsettled scores".

India Today said, "Shrenu Parikh is quite convincing as Janhvi, who can deceive anyone with her perfect bahu act. Ayub Khan fits well into the role of a strict head of the family. Ek Bhram – Sarvagun Sampanna looks promising and will keep the viewers hooked with its interesting twists and turns".

== Production ==
=== Development ===
The show was launched in a 1000-year-old heritage called Saas–Bahu temple located in Udaipur, Rajasthan.

The initial sequences of the series were inspired from real life incidents of a highly influential Indian family whom the makers maintained confidential. Due to this, they received threat phone calls from some of the families fearing threat to their identity.

In June 2019, the show went through a revamp in its storyline to increase the very low ratings, due to which actors Ayub Khan and Tanvi Dogra who were playing PK Mittal and Kavya Mittal respectively had to exit the show. Speaking about it producer Dipti Kalwani said, "The show is going in for a revamp with the existing cast. Actors are not quitting and will be brought back soon".

=== Cancellation ===
Despite the revamp in June 2019, the ratings did not reach expectations and thus, the shoot of the series concluded on 13 September 2019 while the series aired its last episode on 20 September 2019.
