= Tanvi Dogra =

Indian actress

- Born: Tanvi Dogra; 31 August 1998 (age 28); Chandigarh, India
- Occupation: Actress
- Years active: 2016–present
- Notable work: Jiji Maa; Parineetii; Mannat – Har Khushi Paane Ki 2

Tanvi Dogra is an Indian television actress best known for portraying Falguni Purohit in Jiji Maa, Neetii Juneja in Parineetii., and Mannat Juneja in Mannat – Har Khushi Paane Ki 2

== Career ==
Dogra started her career by portraying Babita Sharma in Zee TV's Meri Saasu Maa in 2017.

She received recognition through Star Bharat's Jiji Maa which ran from 2017 to 2019 where she played the protagonist Falguni Purohit Rawat.

In 2019, she portrayed Kavya Singhania Mittal in the revenge thriller Ek Bhram Sarvagun Sampanna on Star Plus but quit the series midway.

From 2020 to 2021, she portrayed dual role as Swati Mishra Singh and Babli in &TV's Santoshi Maa.

From February 2022 to August 2025, she portrayed Neetii Juneja in Colors TV's Parineetii opposite Ankur Verma. Since October 2026, she playing Mannat Juneja in Colors TV's Mannat Har Khushi Paane Ki 2.

== Filmography ==
=== Television ===
Year	Title	Role	Ref.
2016	Vidya-Ek Kiran Ummeed Ki		
2016	Meri Sasu Maa	Babita Sharma	
2017–2019	Jiji Maa	Falguni Purohit Rawat	
2019	Ek Bhram...Sarvagun Sampanna	Kavya Singhania Mittal	
2020–2021	Santoshi Maa - Sunayein Vrat Kathayein	Swati Mishra Singh/Babli	
2022–2025	Parineetii	Neeti Juneja	
2026–present	Mannat – Har Khushi Paane Ki 2	Mannat Juneja	

=== Special appearances ===
Year	Title	Role	Notes	Ref.
2022	Saavi Ki Savaari	Neetii Juneja	Special Episode: Saavi and Nityam's Sangeet	
2024	Suhaagan: Ke Rang Jashn Ke Rang	Neetii Juneja	Holi celebration	
2024	Mangal Lakshmi	Neetii Juneja	Lakshmi's wedding	
2025	Megha Barsenge	Neetii Juneja	Holi celebration	

== External Link ==
- Tanvi Dogra at IMDb
- Tanvi Dogra on Instagram
