= Anita Kanwal =

Indian television actress and producer

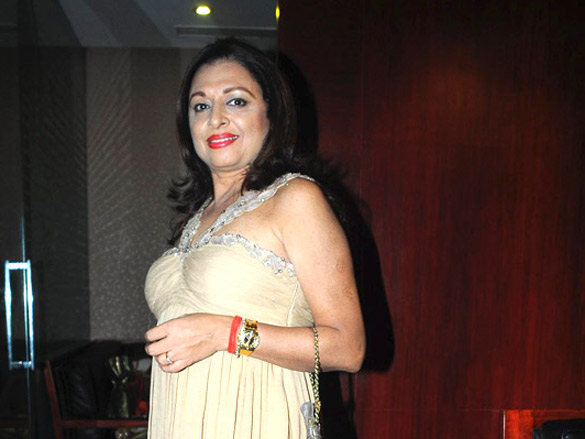
- Born: 9 April 1954 (age 72); Lucknow, Uttar Pradesh, India
- Years active: 1987–present
- Children: 2 daughters (including Pooja Kanwal)

Anita Kanwal is an Indian television actress and producer who has acted in television serials such as Chanakya, Shanti and Sonpari. She is best known for her negative role of Mrs. Seth, the mother who gets her own son killed, in the 1990s Zee TV soap opera Banegi Apni Baat.

Kanwal started her own production house in 2002 and produced the television serial Goonj Ateet Ki. She made her film debut in 1993 with Kabhi Haan Kabhi Naa (1993). Television Actress Pooja Kanwal is her daughter.

== Filmography ==
=== Films ===
Year	Film	Role	Notes
1993	Geetanjali	Sagar's elder sister	
1994	Kabhi Haan Kabhi Naa	Chris's mother	
1999	Laawaris		
2001	Pyaar Ishq Aur Mohabbat		
2002	Mujhse Dosti Karoge		
2002	Na Tum Jaano Na Hum		
2003	Gangaajal		
2003	Kyon?		
2005	The Hangman		
2009	Team: The Force		

=== Television ===
Year	Serial	Role	Channel	Notes
1991	Chanakya	Subhada (Spy in Taxila)	DD National	
1992	Humrahi		DD National	
1995	Banegi Apni Baat	Mrs. Seth	DD National	
1995	Shanti	Indu Singh	DD National	
1995	Junoon		DD National	
1998	Just Mohabbat	Sumedha	Sony TV	
1998	Chattaan			
2000–2004	Sonpari	Mrs. Dhillon	Star Plus	
2001–2002	Sansaar		Zee TV	
2002	Goonj Ateet Ki			Also producer
2004	Aa Bahen Chugli Karen			
2005	Hari Mirchi Lal Mirchi	Ritu's mother	DD National	
2008	Radhaa Ki Betiyaan Kuch Kar Dikhayengi	Roshan Ammu	NDTV Imagine	
2010–2012	Sasural Genda Phool	Daadi/Mumtaz/Shanti Daadi	Star Plus	
2011	Ring Wrong Ring		SAB TV	
2013–2014	Gustakh Dil	Nanima	Life OK	
2015	Zindagi Abhi Baaki Hai Mere Ghost	Dadi	Life OK	
2016	Darr Sabko Lagta Hai		&TV	Episode No. 41
2018	Yeh Rishta Kya Kehlata Hai	Masi Dadi (Tejasvini)	Star Plus	Episode No. 2590-2594
2021–2022	Sasural Genda Phool 2	Gayatri Kashyap	Star Plus	

== Awards ==
Year	Award	Category	Serial	Outcome
2015	Indian Telly Awards	Best Actress in a Supporting Role	Zindagi Abhi Baaki Hai Mere Ghost	Nominated
