= Adnan Khan =

Indian television actor (born 1988)

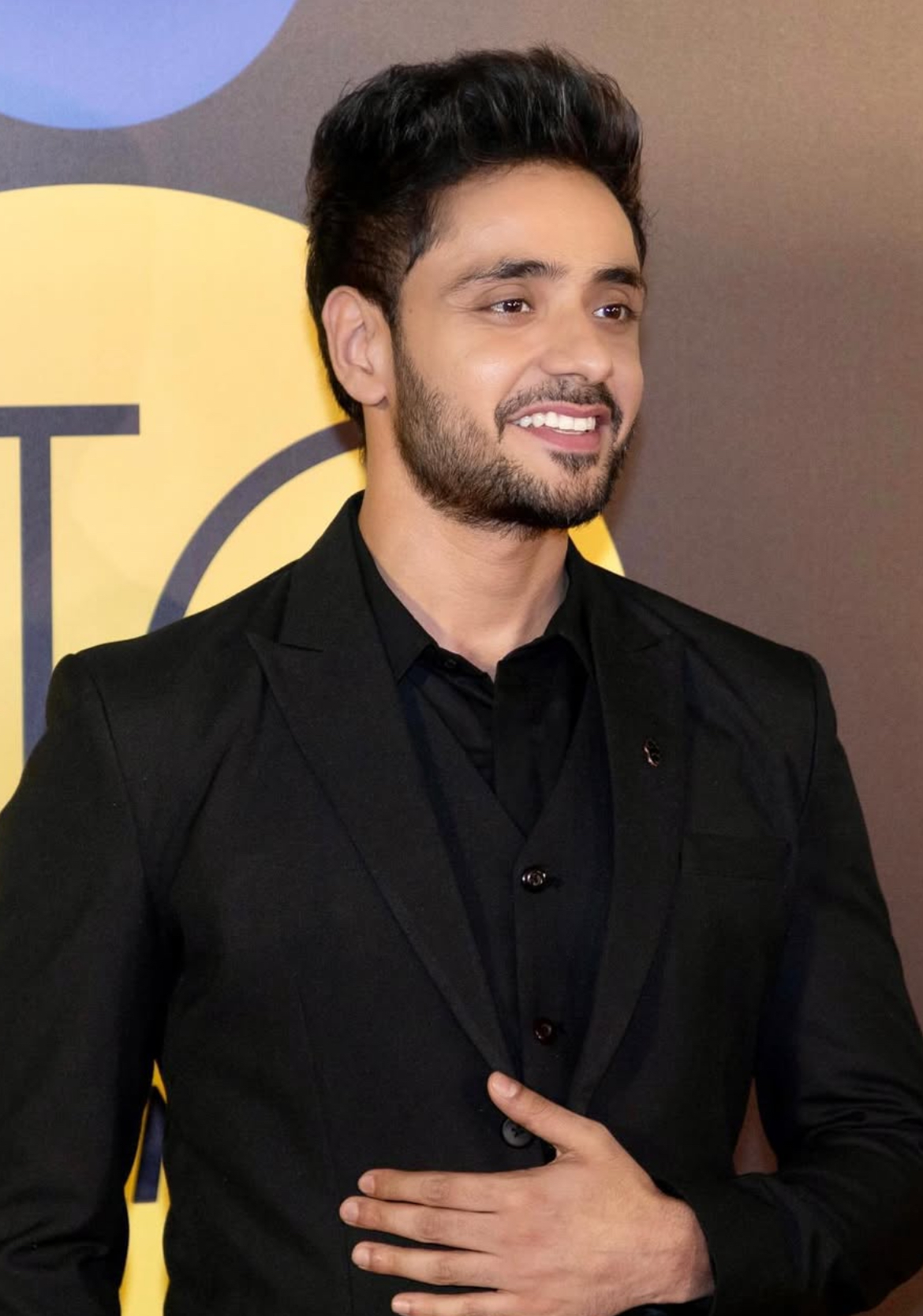
- Khan in 2023
- Born: Dubai, United Arab Emirates
- Occupation: Actor
- Years active: 2010–present
- Known for: Ishq Subhan Allah; Katha Ankahee; Mannat – Har Khushi Paane Ki

Adnan Khan is an Indian actor who appears in Hindi Films and Hindi TV series and Web series. He is best known for his role as Mawlawi Kabeer Ahmed in Ishq Subhan Allah, Viaan Raghuvanshi in Katha Ankahee and Aman "Vikrant" Saluja in Mannat – Har Khushi Paane Ki.

== Early life ==
Khan hails from Dubai, United Arab Emirates. He was born on the 24 December 1988. He has an older brother named Imran Ali.

== Career ==
Whilst working as a Human Resources Manager in Dubai based firm, Khan aspired a career in acting. His short film 'Bubble' shot in Dubai was screened at various international film festivals and won Best Short Film at Tunisia Human Rights Film Festival.

Then he relocated to Mumbai from Dubai and completed an acting diploma at the highly reputed "Actor Prepares", an acting academy founded by veteran actor Anupam Kher. After, Khan went on to participate in numerous stage dramas, short films and web series the most notable being First Among Equals, web series written and produced by Vikram Bhatt.

In March 2018, Khan portrayed the role of Maulwi Kabeer Ahmed in Zee TV's show Ishq Subhan Allah and won many accolades for his performance, including Indian Telly Award for Fresh New Face - Male. The show ran for two and half years and dealt with the sensitive and burning issue of Triple Talaq. In May 2018, Khan appeared in Zee TV's talk show "Juzz Baat" as a guest with Sana Saeed, Arjit Taneja and Karan Jotwani.

In January 2021, Khan did an ad-campaign for SNASH Redefining Car Care based in Dubai, United Arab Emirates. In March 2021, he appeared in a T-Series music video "Mera Aapki kripa Se". In May 2021, Khan made his digital debut with Alt Balaji's web series Hai Taubba portraying the role of Giri Raj.

In January 2022, Khan portrayed the role of Peter in a short film; The Rage- Over Injustice screened at Cannes Film Festival and released on MX Player. In March 2022, he appeared in a music video, Mainu Ishq Nahi Karna opposite Aaira Dwivedi released on Zee Music Company. In April 2022, Khan appeared on Sahurnya Pesbukers a TV show on antv in Indonesia.

In September 2022, Khan next starred alongside Rakesh Bedi and Shagun Sharma in yet another short film Mera Number Kab Aageya, which was a dystopian tale set in 2030 where pregnancy requires government licenses and couples seeking children only to resolve their personal conflicts require introspection. The film was appreciated for its unique concept, officially selected and premiered at various film festivals winning over 25 awards. For his performance, Khan won Best Actor at NexGn International Short Film Festival 2021 Excellence and Appreciation Awards.

From December 2022 to December 2023, Khan portrayed the lead role in Sony Entertainment Television's drama series Katha Ankahee opposite Aditi Sharma. From February 2024 to March 2024, Khan played Ashok in Colors TV's Pracchand Ashok.

In January 2025, Khan starred as Adit in the Hungama OTT feature film Baazi. In March 2025, he portrayed Dr. Kshitiz Murdia in Vikram Bhatt’s Hindi film Tumko Meri Kasam alongside Anupam Kher, Adah Sharma and Esha Deol. From January 2025 to October 2026, he portrayed the role of Aman Kumar in Colors TV's Mannat – Har Khushi Paane Ki.

In May 2026, Khan released his short film Imagine, which he wrote, directed, and starred in. The film was released on the Humaramovie YouTube channel. In July 2026, he featured in the music video Dar Guzar alongside Farrhana Bhatt. The song was performed by Zuhaib Khan and released under F1 Records Official.

== Media image ==
In 2026, he was listed in 40 Under 40 by the Indian edition of Variety.

== Filmography ==
=== Films ===
Year	Title	Role	Notes	Ref.
2010	Vritant	Ashleigh Perera		
2012	Bubble	The Man	Short film	
2013	Worst Thing That Ever Happened to Me			
2015	Story about True Love			
2016	Shenanigans			
2016	Kidnapped			
2017	Software Engineer Ki Bhadaas Unlimited	Engineer	Short film	
2017	TelePlay			
2017	The Unsaid	Sameer	Short film	
2018	Mailguard Chronicles			
2022	The Rage: Over Injustice	Peter	Short film	
2022	Mera Number Kab Aayega	Sagar Saxena	Short film	
2025	Baazi	Adit	Feature film; direct-to-OTT (Hungama)	
2025	Tumko Meri Kasam	Dr. Kshitiz Murdia		
2026	Imagine	Jonathan The Priest	Short film directed & Written by Adnan Khan	

=== Television ===
Year	Title	Role	Notes	Ref.
2014	Arjun	Adil		
2014	Love By Chance	Tej Sahay		
2014	Friends: Conditions Apply	Omar		
2015	Twist Wala Love	Sumeet Malhotra		
2015	Dil Ko Aaj Phir Se Jeene Ki Tamanna Hai	Akarsh Jaisingh		
2018	Juzzbaatt – Sangeen Se Namkeen Tak	Himself	Guest appearance	
2018–2020	Ishq Subhan Allah	Mawlawi Kabir Ali Ahmed		
2022–2023	Katha Ankahee	Viaan Raghuvanshi		
2024	Pracchand Ashok	Samrat Ashok Maurya		
2025–2026	Mannat – Har Khushi Paane Ki	Aman Kumar/Vikrant Saluja		

=== Web series ===
Year	Title	Role	Notes	Ref.
2017	First Among Equals			
2019	Ishq Aaj Kal	Mawlawi Kabir Ali Ahmed	Season 1	
2021	Hai Taubba	Giri Raj		

=== Music videos ===
Year	Title	Singer	Ref.
2021	Mera Aapki Kripa Se	Master Saleem	
2022	Mainu Ishq Nahi Karna	Moin Sabri	
2026	Dar Guzar	Zuhaib Khan	

== Accolades ==
Year	Award	Category	Work	Result	Ref.
2019	Indian Telly Awards	Fresh New Face – Male	Ishq Subhan Allah	Won	
