= Anjum Fakih =

Indian television actress and model

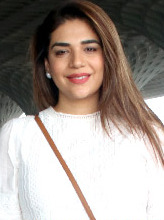
- Fakih in 2023
- Born: 12 September 1989 (age 37); Ratnagiri, Maharashtra, India
- Occupations: Actress; model
- Years active: 2009—present
- Works: See list

Anjuum Fakih (born 12 September 1989) earlier known as Anjum Fakih is an Indian actress and model who works in Hindi television. She is best known for her work in Zee TV soap operas Ek Tha Raja Ek Thi Rani (2015–16) and Kundali Bhagya (2017–23), and Sony TV's Bade Achhe Lagte Hain 2 (2021–22).

== Early life ==
Anjum Fakih was born on 12 September 1989 in Ratnagiri, Maharashtra, India, in a Konkani Muslim family. Her parents, Kamaluddin Fakih and Sultana Fakih live in Vikhroli and Panderi, Ratnagiri. She completed her education from University of Mumbai. At the age of 19, she left her home to pursue a career in acting and modeling and relocated herself to Mumbai. Later, she enrolled herself in Elan Modelling Agency Pvt Ltd., where she started her career as a model. She subsequently appeared in several commercials.

== Career ==
Fakih decided to become a model when she was just 19 years old. In 2010, she ventured into Hindi television with an unnoticed role as Bonita Ahluwalia in rom-com Mahi Way.

After a five-year hiatus, she returned to television in 2015 with Star Plus's romantic drama Tere Sheher Mein, which featured her as Rachita Mathur. In the same year, she also appeared in Time Machine. Later that year in December, Fakih starred as the evil antagonist, Rani Rageshwari in Ek Tha Raja Ek Thi Rani, a period drama broadcast on Zee TV, and was highly appreciated for her acting skills before she left the show in 2016.

In February 2017, she signed Colors TV's social drama Devanshi. It saw her portray Sakshi, the adoptive sister of main titular character Devanshi (played by Helly Shah).

Since July 2017, Fakih portrayed Srishti Arora Luthra, opposite Abhishek Kapoor in Zee TV's Kundali Bhagya. Her performance as the naughty and fun-loving Srishti won her a Gold Award. The show was the biggest weekday launch in terms of TRP. She decided to quit the series after six long years in October 2023.

While being a part of Kundali Bhagya, Fakih did multiple other projects: in 2018 and 2020, she made cameo appearances in Ekta Kapoor's other productions Dil Hi Toh Hai (on Sony TV) and Naagin 5 (on Colors TV) respectively. In 2020, Fakih was seen playing key roles in two web shows, Kashmakash and Kehne Ko Humsafar Hain. In December 2020, she made her music video debut with Ik Dafa Toh Mil. From 2021 to 2022, Fakih was seen as Maitri in Bade Achhe Lagte Hain 2.

From December 2023, she portrayed a politician, Ankita Rao in Sony TV's Dabangii – Mulgii Aayi Re Aayi until it went off-air in June 2024. Since January 2026, she returned to fiction after two years, portrayed Dr. Avantika in Colors TV's Dr. Aarambhi.

== Personal life ==
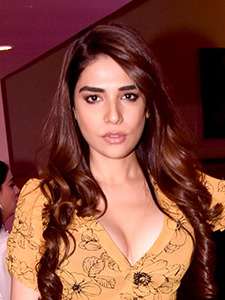
Fakih in 2017

Fakih's conservative parents were not in favour of her joining the entertainment industry, and she ultimately had to leave their house to pursue her career.

Fakih is a Muslim. She wore a burqa throughout her student life but abandoned it after she started working. She faced backlash on Instagram in 2019 for posting pictures of herself praying to Shiva on Maha Shivaratri, a Hindu festival. In March 2024, she performed pilgrimage to Mecca and Medina along with her mother.

=== Relationships ===
Fakih started dating Marathi actor and RJ Kettan Singh in 2019. The couple broke up a year later. In March 2023, she revealed she has been in a relationship with marketing manager Rohit Jadhav since 2021. They were reportedly separated by January 2024.

== Filmography ==
=== Television ===
Year	Title	Role	Notes	Ref.
2010	Mahi Way	Bonita Ahluwalia		
2015	Tere Sheher Mein	Rachita Agnihotri		
2015	Time Machine	Roshni Chatterjee		
2015–2016	Ek Tha Raja Ek Thi Rani	Rageshwari Singh		
2017	Devanshi	Sakshi Bhatnagar		
2017–2023	Kundali Bhagya	Srishti Arora Luthra		
2021–2022	Bade Achhe Lagte Hain 2	Maitri Sood Bahl		
2023	Fear Factor: Khatron Ke Khiladi 13	Contestant	11th place	
2023–2024	Dabangii – Mulgii Aayi Re Aayi	Ankita Rao		
2025	Chhoriyan Chali Gaon	Contestant	8th Place	
2026–present	Dr. Aarambhi	Dr. Avantika Mehta		

=== Special appearances ===
Year	Title	Role	Ref.
2017/2018	Kumkum Bhagya	Srishti Arora	
2018	Dil Hi Toh Hai	Herself	
2020	Naagin 5	Noor Beg	
2021	Bhagya Lakshmi	Srishti Arora	

=== Music videos ===
Year	Title	Singer	Ref.
2020	Ik Dafa To Mil	Oye Kunaal	

=== Web series ===
Year	Title	Role	Notes	Ref.
2020	Kashmakash	Guddi		
2020	Kehne Ko Humsafar Hain	Nisha	Season 3	
