= Jiji Maa =

Indian television series

- Genre: Soap opera
- Created by: Jay Mehta; Kinnari Mehta
- Written by: Mayur Puri
- Directed by: Rohit Raj Goyal; Abinaash Sharrma; Creative Director Trivendra Singh
- Country of origin: India
- Original language: Hindi
- No. of episodes: 418

Production
- Producer: Jay Mehta
- Production location: Mumbai
- Camera setup: Multi Camera
- Running time: 21 minutes
- Production company: Jay Production

Original release
- Network: STAR Bharat
- Release: 9 October 2017 – 18 February 2019

Related
- Lakshmi Kalyanam; Seetha Kalyanam

Jiji Maa is an Indian drama television series produced by Jay Productions which aired on Star Bharat from 9 October 2017 to 18 February 2019. Adapted from the Telugu soap opera Lakshmi Kalyanam, it starred Tanvi Dogra, Dishank Arora, Bhavika Sharma and Shubhashish Jha. The story of the series is set in Jaipur, revolving around two sisters.

== Plot ==
Falguni and Niyati Purohit are sisters from a poor family, supported by their mother. When their mother dies, she leaves Niyati in Falguni's care, telling her that she is now Niyati's 'Jiji Maa' (sister mother). Falguni works to fund Niyati's education, remaining illiterate herself.

=== Years later ===
An adult Falguni and Niyati meet Uttara Devi Rawat, an unpleasant and arrogant woman who dislikes poor people. Falguni gets into a fight with Uttara, but later apologises to her driver, Suresh. Humiliated, Uttara vows to take revenge on the sisters. Suresh, who is actually Uttara's son Suyash, falls in love with Falguni. Niyati tries to commit suicide, but Falguni stops her. Falguni is shocked to find out that Niyati is pregnant with her ex-boyfriend's child. It is revealed that her ex-boyfriend is Vidhaan, Uttara Devi's younger son.

Falguni helps Vidhaan and Niyati get back together. After Vidhaan tries to commit suicide, Uttara is forced to accept them. It is then revealed that Uttara is Suyash's maternal aunt and stepmother. She finds a will bequeathing the entire Rawat estate to Suyash and plots to marry him to an infertile woman, ensuring that he will never have children to inherit it.

Meanwhile, Falguni and Suresh fall in love. Uttara demands that Falguni marry her older son, Suyash, and sign an agreement stating that she will never have children. Only then will Uttara agree to the marriage of Niyati and Vidhaan. Falguni agrees and breaks up with Suresh. Niyati tries to stop her, but fails. On the wedding day, Suyash and Falguni discover that they are about to marry each other, and are shocked.

Falguni tries to win Suyash's heart, but to no avail. She starts working with the Kalaakaars at the Rawats' textile factory, helping them to get their jobs back from Uttara and impressing Suyash in the process. She then helps Suyash track down his biological mother, Gayatri, who has been accused of murder and is hated by Suyash's father, Jayant, due to misunderstandings created by Uttara. This brings them closer, and Suyash accepts that Gayatri must have had a reason for rejecting him.

A child named Chiku is brought to Rawat House, where it is revealed that he is Suyash's illegitimate son with Shreya. Having faked her own death, Shreya asks Falguni to promise that she will raise Chiku as her own and not have any children of her own. However, Uttara takes Falguni to Mumbai for a hysterectomy, where she discovers that Shreya is alive and well, and that she is working with Uttara. Falguni devises an elaborate plan to expose Uttara's evil intentions to the family. Eventually, she succeeds by faking Vidhaan's death, causing a distraught Uttara to confess her crimes. She is sent to prison, but soon escapes. However, when Vidhaan rejects her, she becomes distraught and is shown falling off a cliff.

Falguni's long-lost twin sister, Piyali, enters their lives with the intention of ruining Falguni. She takes over the Rawats' textile mill and invites Uttara to join the company. She manages to turn Niyati against Falguni. When Suyash is diagnosed with lung cancer, he distances himself from Falguni. Piyali gets close to him by helping with his treatment, which upsets Falguni. Despite being in love with Falguni, Suyash serves her with divorce papers. Falguni discovers that Uttara and Piyali fabricated Suyash's cancer diagnosis, but she is unable to inform him in time, and he ends up marrying Piyali. In an attempt to make Piyali jealous, Falguni marries her lover Karma, and Piyali finally gives in and agrees to leave Suyash. Uttara tries to manipulate Karma into staying with Falguni, but Falguni helps him to see the truth. Piyali leaves the Rawats' house with Karma, and Falguni and Suyash finally reunite after overcoming many obstacles.

Suyash and Vidhaan's aunt, Haryali, visits the family and tells them that, according to a dream she had, the Rawat family must have a child within ten months, otherwise the family will be destroyed. However, it is revealed that Niyati's uterus was damaged in an accident, making it unlikely that she will become pregnant. Haryali emotionally manipulates Niyati into leaving Vidhaan for his own good. Meanwhile, Uttara tries to delay the wedding of Falguni and Suyash, but Falguni becomes pregnant and gives birth to a boy named Govind. However, Govind supposedly dies in an accident. Suyash blames Falguni, accusing her of only caring about becoming a Jiji Maa to her sister. He throws her out of the house, and Niyati follows her sister and leaves Vidhaan.

=== 7 years later ===
Falguni is one of the most prominent businesswomen, running the company Jiji Maa Textiles. She has modernised, whereas Suyash has become an arrogant businessman. It is revealed that Govind was raised by local gangsters Chamki and Devraj as Laddoo, a pickpocket.

Uttara lives with Falguni and Niyati, and she is portrayed as mentally unstable. A rival businessman named Abhishek tries to damage Suyash's reputation, but fails. He teams up with Uttara, who has been pretending to be insane and wants to harm Suyash. Together, they hire Devraj to kill Suyash. However, Falguni manages to save him every time. After repeatedly failing, Devraj eventually kills his own wife to save himself. Falguni finds her while she is dying, and Chamki tells Falguni that Laddoo isn't actually their child.

Falguni realises that Govind is her child and goes to tell Suyash, but he sends her away. Abhishek then contacts Falguni, telling her that he has Laddoo and that she must kill Suyash to get him back. Falguni pretends to have killed Suyash and goes to collect Laddoo, but Devraj and Abhishiek capture her and plan to kill her. Suyash saves her. The police arrest Abhishek and Devraj. Falguni, Suyash and Govind are reunited.

Suyash throws a party to celebrate the return of his child. Uttara shows up and tries to kill them. With the help of Laddoo, her plan backfires and she dies in a fire. The show then takes a leap forward in time, showing the Rawat family living happily. Niyati reveals that she and Vidhaan are planning to adopt a baby, and this is how the show Jiji Maa ends.

== Cast ==
=== Main ===
- Tanvi Dogra as Falguni Purohit Rawat – Niyati and Piyali's sister; Suyash's wife; Govind's mother (2017–2019)
- Dishank Arora as Suyash Rawat – Jayant and Gayatri's son; Uttara's nephew and stepson; Vidhaan's half-brother; Falguni's husband; Govind's father (2017–2019)
- Bhavika Sharma as Niyati Purohit Rawat – Falguni and Piyali's sister; Vidhaan's wife (2017–2019)
- Shubhashish Jha as Vidhaan Rawat – Jayant and Uttara's son; Suyash's half-brother; Niyati's husband

=== Recurring ===
- Rajeev Paul as Jayant Rawat – Haryali's brother; Gayatri and Uttara's husband; Suyash and Vidhaan's father; Govind's grandfather
- Pallavi Pradhan as Uttara Choksi Rawat – Gayatri's sister; Jayant's second wife; Suyash's aunt and stepmother; Vidhaan's mother
- Charu Asopa as Shravani "Piyali" Purohit – Falguni and Niyati's long-lost sister; Karma's love interest
- Naveen Pandita as Karma – Piyali's love interest
- Krutika Desai Khan as Haryali Rawat – Jayant's sister
- Gauransh Sharma as Govind "Laddoo" Rawat – Falguni and Suyash's son
- Randheer Rai as Abhishek Sanghvi – Suyash's business rival
- Rashmi Singh as Shreya – Suyash's college friend
- Ayesha Vindhara as Chiku – Shreya's daughter
- Anjali Gupta as Gayatri Choksi Rawat – Uttara's sister; Jayant's first wife; Suyash's mother; Govind's grandmother
