= Parineetii (TV series) =

Indian drama television series

- Genre: Drama; Romance
- Created by: Ekta Kapoor
- Developed by: Ekta Kapoor
- Screenplay by: Anil Nagpal; Mrinal Tripathi
- Story by: Anil Nagpal; Kavita Nagpal
- Directed by: Muzammil Desai; Kushal Javeri
- Creative director: Shivangi Babbar
- Starring: Anchal Sahu; Tanvi Dogra; Ankur Verma; Paras Kalnawat; Pratiksha Honmukhe
- Theme music composer: Lalit Sen; Nawab Arzoo
- Opening theme: “Yeh Teri Meri Dosti Hai Zindagi Ki Aas”
- Composer: Aashish Rego
- Country of origin: India
- Original language: Hindi
- No. of seasons: 2
- No. of episodes: 1,216

Production
- Executive producer: Tanushree Das Gupta
- Producers: Ekta Kapoor; Shobha Kapoor
- Production location: Mumbai
- Editors: Vikas Sharma; Vishal Sharma; Sandeep Bhatt
- Camera setup: Multi-camera
- Running time: 20–44 minutes
- Production company: Balaji Telefilms

Original release
- Network: Colors TV
- Release: 14 February 2022 – 24 August 2025

Parineetii is an Indian Hindi-language television drama series that aired from 14 February 2022 to 24 August 2025 on Colors TV and streams digitally on JioHotstar. It was produced by Ekta Kapoor and Shobha Kapoor under Balaji Telefilms. One of the longest running Indian television soap opera, the series starred Anchal Sahu, Tanvi Dogra, Ankur Verma, Paras Kalnawat and Pratiksha Honmukhe.

== Plot ==
Parineet Kakkar and Neeti Juneja, two best friends cross paths with Rajeev Bajwa. After meeting Neeti, Rajeev immediately falls in love with her. Hence, he rejects Pari, the girl his mother recommends for him. Due to circumstances at Pari's wedding with Varun, Rajeev reluctantly marries Pari. Later, he moves to Chandigarh, leaving Pari behind. Rajeev in Chandigarh lives with his aunt, uncle and cousins. Neeti is also in Chandigarh, completing her Air Hostess course. After Pari's father's death, Pari arrives in Chandigarh to find Rajeev. Pari unexpectedly runs into Neeti and stays with Neeti. Rajeev proposes to Neeti, who is unaware of his marriage to Pari. Rajeev and Neeti marry without Pari's knowledge. Pari takes Neeti to a hospital after her accident and discovers Rajeev is Sanju, Neeti's husband.

Later on, Pari discovers that Neeti is pregnant with Rajeev's child and requests the Bajwa family to accept Neeti. Soon, Neeti suffers from miscarriage and finds out that she can never become a mother again. Pari then decides to become her and Sanju's surrogate mother and continues to reside in the Bajwa house. Bebe, who is seeking revenge against the Bajwa family, poisons Neeti's mind against Pari. Neeti starts to hate Pari as she suspect her of having an affair with Sanju. She tries to kill Pari, but fails. Over various incidents, Rajeev falls in love with Pari.

Eventually, Neeti’s truth is exposed in front of the entire family. Neeti files for divorce and she and Sanju get divorced. Following this, Pari and Rajeev are married again and Rajeev promises to be by her side forever. Neeti then fakes her memory loss and ends up staying in the Bajwa house. Neeti causes Pari to miscarry. Neeti then gets pregnant with Rajeev's child using IVF, pretending to help Pari and Rajeev become parents again. Gurinder forces Rajeev and Pari to divorce and arranges for his marriage with Neeti. Pari realises that Neeti is feigning memory loss. Fearing Pari would expose her, Neeti with Gurinder, Daljeet and Rakesh's help, push Pari down a cliff. Neeti makes her believe that Rajeev is also involved with their plan and wants Pari dead. Pari is assumed to be dead by the Bajwa family. However, Pari is later rescued by Ambika Singhania. Ambika encourages Pari to seek revenge against everyone who has wronged her.

Neeti usurps Kakkar family's property and has kept Gurpreet, Vikram and Babli as her servants. Likewise, Pami is also forced to do the household chores as Gurinder, Bebe and Chandrika are on Neeti's side. Pari comes back to take revenge as Parvati Singhania, Ambika's daughter. Everyone initially doubts her to be Pari, but they start believing she is Paravati because of her change in attitude and personality. Neeti, however, is sure that Parvati is Pari and that she has come back for revenge. She instigates her accomplices that Parvati is Pari, and they also start to believe that Pari is back for vengeance. Neeti then goes to Singhania House to expose Parvati, but it backfires on her and she is jailed. Afterwards, Neeti tries many things to prove Parvati is Pari, but she is unsuccessful each time.

Rajeev, who is fed up of Neeti's antics, breaks off his relationship with her. Out of anger, Neeti tries to murder Pari by locking her in the cold storage. However, Rajeev manages to save Pari in time. He finds out it was Neeti that locked up Parvati, but misunderstands the reason as to why. Rajeev leaves the house, but has to return after Neeti fakes a suicide attempt. He also agrees to marry Neeti to make Parvati jealous, as he is conceived that Parvati is Pari. Parvati pretends to be Pari's ghost to scare Neeti so that she can confess her murder attempt however she's unable to prove her plan to the family causing her to be admitted to a mental facility. After she's back she blackmails Babli to marry Daljeet. However, Parvati and Rajeev rescue Babli on time. Rajeev proposes to Neeti for marriage in an attempt to make Parvati jealous so that she reveals the truth about her being Pari and stops the wedding. Ambika brainwashes Gurinder against Neeti due to her misbehavior with elders. Eventually, Gurinder and Daljeet become fed up with Neeti's constant domination and plot to get Rajeev and Parvati married instead.

Parvati and Rajeev successfully get married, Neeti is furious at the fact that Gurinder plotted this against her. Rajeev shifts to Parvati's house to live with her. Eventually they both go to Bajwa house for Lohri. With Rajeev trying to make Parvati fall in love with him, Neeti plans to kill Gurinder as the later wanted Parvati as her daughter in law. After a series of events, Parvati is arrested for trying to kill Gurinder. However, Rajeev saves her in time. Due to Rakesh and Neeti's schemes, Gurpreet is then arrested for the same. This time, Parvati saves her mother by fooling Rakesh and Neeti. In an attempt to take revenge from Neeti, Gurpreet asks for the land which Neet had deceitfully taken away from them. With police involved and falling prey to Parvati's schemes, Neeti and Rakesh are arrested. Neeti gets a bail. Neeti wants Gurpreet's land as it's near the highway but Parvati makes her buy it for 2cr for which Neeti has to take a loan. Bajwa house is auctioned since Neeti fails to pay the installments. Parvati buys it and enters the Bajwa house as its new owner. She takes revenge from the Bajwas for treating her family like maids. Further, she hosts a party to expose Neeti's crimes and announce her ownership, but a new character is revealed. Prithvi Agnihotri, the Big Shark schemes against Parvati and it turns out that the property papers were fake. Parvati also fails to get a loan from banks. She gets to know his identity through the bank personnel and goes to meet him. After a brief conversation, Prithvi gets Parvati arrested for trespassing into his office. Parvati gets a bail, and Prithvi and Neeti join hands. Rajeev finds out that Parvati is Pari and joins hands with her and Ambika. Ambika dies and Rajeev is accused and arrested for the murder. Prithvi blackmails Pari to marry him in exchange of Rajeev's release. Prithvi realises his mistake after learning that Ambika was not responsible for Parvati's death. He ask Pari to save Rajeev and leave the marriage. Neeti becomes desperate to kill Pari. Pari and Rajeev take shelter at Kalyani's house. She ask them to stay in hiding from everyone till 8 months. They are living at Kalyani's secret house. Parineet and Neeti both gives birth to their daughters, Preet and Nisha respectively. However Neeti locates Parineet, Rajeev and Preet and pushes off Parineet and Rajeev off the cliff and throws Preet in a river from where she gets rescued and adopted by a local village couple.

Parineet's daughter Preet is living in Barnala with her foster family and is set to get married. Preet ia a look-alike of her mother Parineet. On her way to marriage, the bus carrying the family meets with an accident putting her foster mother's life at risk. In the meantime, Neeti became rich businesswoman while Nisha is spoilt, arrogant, self-obsessed and selfish. Rajeev is paralysed and everyone persumes Parineet dead who now serves as a nurse after losing her memories illogically. Preet travels to Chandigarh to get injection for her mother and crosses the path with Aditya Kashyap, owner of a leading hotel chain and Neeti's business rival Sushma Kashyap's grandson. They misunderstand each other since their first meet and often ends up in fights. Meanwhile Nisha too crosses path with him after he saves her from getting molested and gets obsessed with him on seeing his resentment and disinterest towards her. Soon Preet's wedding is called off and she shifts to Chandigarh with her family and doesn't want to get married. Aditya has a past secret due to which he resents women and doesn't want to get married. Soon Preet's family and Sushma chose Preet and Aditya as potential match for each other. Sushma wins the businesswoman of the year award and in anger Neeti decides to kill her. Nisha feels jealous and insecure seeing Aditya and Preet together.

== Cast ==
=== Main ===
- Anchal Sahu as
  - Parineet "Pari" Kakkar Bajwa: Jaswant and Gurpreet's daughter; Nupur's sister; Rajeev's first wife; Preet's mother; Nisha's step-mother. (2022–2025)
  - Preet Bajwa Kashyap: Rajeev and Parineet's daughter; Neetii's step-daughter; Nisha's half-sister; Aditya's wife. (2025)
- Tanvi Dogra as Neetii Juneja Bajwa: Sukhwinder's daughter; Rocky's sister; Rajeev's second wife; Nisha's mother; Preet's step-mother. (2022–2025)
- Ankur Verma as Rajeev "Sanju" Bajwa: Karanveer and Gurinder's son; Amit and Keerti's brother; Parineet and Neetii's husband; Preet and Nisha's father. (2022–2025)
- Pratiksha Honmukhe as Nisha Bajwa: Rajeev and Neetii's daughter; Parineet's step-daughter; Preet's half-sister; Aditya's obssesive lover (2025)
- Paras Kalnawat as Aditya Kashyap: Virendra and Simran's son; Preet's husband. (2025)

=== Recurring ===
==== Kakkars ====
- Kaushal Kapoor as Jaswant Kakkar: Harman's brother; Gurpreet's husband; Parineet and Nupur's father; Preet's grandfather. (2022)
- Dolly Sohi / Bidisha Ghosh Sharma as Gurpreet Kakkar: Jaswant's wife; Parineet and Nupur's mother; Preet's grandmother. (2022–2024) / (2024–2025)
- Khushi Bharadwaj as Nupur Kakkar: Jaswant and Gurpreet's daughter; Parineet's sister. (2022–2024)
- Jeetu Vazirani as Harman Kakkar: Jaswant's brother; Mandeep's husband; Vikram and Simar's father. (2022–2023)
- Arpana Agarwal as Mandeep Kakkar: Harman's wife; Vikram and Simar's mother. (2022–2023)
- Ashish Dixit / Aryan Arora as Vikram "Vicky" Kakkar: Harman and Mandeep's son; Simar's brother. (2022) / (2024–2025)
- Sia Bhatia as Simar "Babli" Kakkar: Harman and Mandeep's daughter; Vikram's sister. (2022–2025)

==== Bajwas ====
- Neena Cheema as Beeji Bajwa: Karanveer and Rajveer's mother; Amit, Rajeev, Keerti, Balwinder, Monty, Daljeet and Simmi's grandmother; Preet and Nisha's great-grandmother. (2022–2023)
- Anjali Mukhi / Alka Mogha as Gurinder Bajwa: Karanveer's wife; Amit, Rajeev and Keerti's mother; Preet and Neeti's grandmother. (2022) / (2022–2025)
- Aakash Talwar as Amit Bajwa: Karanveer and Gurinder's son; Rajeev and Keerti's brother; Chandrika's husband. (2022–2024)
- Harshpreet Kaur / Mansi Jain as Chandrika Bajwa: Amit's wife. (2022–2023) / (2023–2024)
- Tiaara Kaur as Keerti Bajwa: Karanveer and Gurinder's daughter; Amit and Rajeev's sister. (2022)
- Bobby Parvez / Arup Pal as Rajveer Bajwa: Beeji's son; Karanveer's brother; Parminder's husband; Balwinder, Monty, Daljeet and Simmi's father. (2022) / (2022–2024)
- Vaishnavi Macdonald as Parminder "Pammi" Bajwa; Rajveer's wife; Balwinder, Monty, Daljeet and Simmi's mother. (2022–2025)
- Abhinandan Singh as Balwinder Bajwa: Rajveer and Parminder's son; Monty, Daljeet and Simmi's brother. (2022–2024)
- Rishi Grover / Prabhat Choudhary / Sparsh Singh Kotwal as Monty Bajwa: Rajveer and Parminder's son; Balwinder, Daljeet and Simmi's brother. (2022–2023) / (2023) / (2023–2025)
- Rushal Parakh / Manjeet Makkar / Varun Sharma as Daljeet Bajwa: Rajveer and Parminder's son; Balwinder, Monty and Simmi's brother. (2023–2024) / (2024–2025) / (2025)
- Coral Bhamra / Ankita Singh Bamb as Simmi Bajwa: Rajveer and Parminder's daughter; Balwinder, Monty and Daljeet's sister. (2022) / (2022–2024)

==== Junejas ====
- Sonia Shrivastava as Sukhwinder Juneja: Kanwal's sister; Neeti and Rocky's mother; Nisha's grandmother. (2022–2024)
- Vivan Singh Rajput as Rocky Juneja: Sukhwinder's son; Neeti's brother. (2022)
- Amit Kapoor as Kanwal Juneja: Sukhwinder's brother. (2022)

==== Ahlawats ====
- Raja Kapse as Mr. Ahlawat: Mrs. Ahlawat's husband; Rakesh's father. (2022)
- Anasua Chakraborty as Mrs. Ahlawat: Mr. Ahlawat's wife; Rakesh's mother. (2022)
- Vishal Solanki as Rakesh Singh Ahlawat: Mr. and Mrs. Ahlawat's son; Parineet's obssesive lover. (2022–2024)

==== Khuranas ====
- Siddharth Dhawan as Manoj Khurana: Sharda's husband; Gurleen's father; Preet's adoptive father. (2025)
- Yashu Dhiman as Sharda Khurana: Manoj's wife; Gurleen's mother; Preet's adoptive mother. (2025)
- Sarah Killedar as Gurleen Khurana: Manoj and Sharda's daughter; Preet's adoptive sister. (2025)

==== Kashyaps ====
- Beena Banerjee as Sushma Kashyap: Virendra's mother; Aditya and Parth's grandmother. (2025)
- Manasi Joshi Roy as Simran Kashyap: Virendra's wife; Aditya's mother. (2025)
- Meera Sarang as Jasmeet Kashyap: Parth's mother. (2025)
- Unknown as Parth Kashyap: Jasmeet's son. (2025)

==== Others ====
- Kajal Chauhan as Shalu Sharma (2022)
- Sonal Vengurlekar as Kiran Kapoor (2022)
- Prashant Sethi as Varun Malhotra (2022)
- Hemant Choudhary as Devraj Malhotra (2022)
- Bhavya Chauhan as Shreya Singh (2022)
- Utkarsh Gupta as Ajay Kumar (2022)
- Aman Gandhi as Vishal Singh (2022–2023)
- Karuna Verma as Doctor (2023)
- Nil Uttam Kumar Parekh as Veer (2023)
- Jitendra Singh Rajpurohit as Mr. Singh (2023)
- Megha Prasad as Madhulika (2024)
- Jeevansh Chadha as Shelly Mehra (2024)
- Shilpa Saklani as Ambika Devi Singhania: Parvati's fake-mother. (2024–2025)
- Seema Anand as Seema "Daima": Singhania family's maid. (2024–2025)
- Unknown as Kalyani (2024–2025)
- Sudeep Sahir as Prithvi Agnihotri: Pari's rival turned friend (2025)
- Sohil Singh Jhuti as Gaurav: Aditya's manager and best friend (2025)

== Production ==
=== Development ===
The show was announced by Ekta Kapoor under Balaji Telefilms. It tells the story of how two best friend marry the same man without realizing, due to their destiny.

Parineetii completed 1000 episodes on January 2025. Thus becoming the sixth longest running show of Colors TV.

=== Casting ===
Anchal Sahu and Tanvi Dogra were cast as the leads Parineet Kakkar and Neeti Juneja. Talking about her character, Dogra said “When I agreed to be part of Parineetii, I didn’t know the extent of Neetii’s transformation. It has been an incredible journey, peeling away the layers of her character. Neetii is a unique persona, exuding joy and independence while also possessing a cunning side.” Ankur Verma was cast as the male lead Rajeev Bajwa. Dolly Sohi was cast as Parineet's mother, Gurpreet Kakkar. Ashish Dixit who played Parineet's cousin, Vikram Kakkar, quit the show in July 2022, due to some creative changes. In October 2023, Rushal Parakh joined the show as Daljeet. In June 2024, Shilpa Saklani joined the cast as Ambika Singhania. In March 2025, Sudeep Sahir was cast to play a cameo Prithvi Agnihotri. In June 2025, the show took a generational leap and started focusing on Parineet and Rajeev's daughter Preet Bajwa, played by Sahu, Aditya Kashyap played by Paras Kalnawat and Neeti and Rajeev's daughter Nisha Bajwa played by Pratiksha Honmukhe while Dogra and Verma continued to play their respective characters of Neeti and Rajeev as elderly parents to the new leads. Within few days, series showed Sahu continuing to play her original role of elderly Parineet too thus playing the dual role of mother-daughter.

== Reception ==
=== Ratings ===
Parineetii maintained a stable viewership footprint on Colors TV, registering competitive viewership positions within its early evening time slot. The series premiered on February 14, 2022, with an initial Television Rating Point of 1.6, establishing a reliable audience share for the network at 7:30 p.m. Driven by the core storyline of love triangle, the daily soap achieved an initial top-ten rank nationwide among Hindi fiction platforms during its early months.

During its peak narrative sequences between late 2022 and mid-2023, the series reached its highest audience viewership, touching an all-time peak of 2.2 TRP weekly. During this period, the program regularly occupied the number one rank within its time slot, outperforming rival network's shows such as StarPlus's Saath Nibhaana Saathiya 2 and later Rajjo. This positioning allowed the series to frequently placed in the top ten overall fiction chart across all Hindi channels.

To refresh the long-running storytelling arcs, the production house introduced a major 20-year generation leap in mid-2025, transitioning focus to the central characters' offspring played by Paras Kalnawat, Anchal Sahu and Pratiksha Honmukhe. Following the narrative transition of this second-generation storyline, the series experienced a decline in ratings, with viewership settling into a lower 1.1 to 1.3 TRP range. This drop in audience share caused the show to decline from its higher rankings to a lower top-twenty chart rank. Consequently, the network repositioned the series out of its primary 7:30 p.m. slot into a secondary early evening 6:30 p.m. time slot. The series registered an all-time low of 0.9 TRP in its final phase before concluding its successful three-year run and 1000+ episodes on August 24, 2025 with a final closing rating of 1.0.

== Crossovers ==
- On 13 November 2024, the show had a crossover episode with Megha Barsenge.
