= Aishwarya Khare =

Indian television actress

- Born: 17 April 1995 (age 31); Bhopal, Madhya Pradesh,India
- Occupation: Actress
- Years active: 2014–present
- Known for: Yeh Hai Chahatein; Bhagya Lakshmi; Dr. Aarambhi
- Height: 5 ft 7 in (1.70 m)
- Parents: Ravi Khare (father); Shubhra Khare (mother)
- Relatives: Pratishtha Khare (sister)

Aishwarya Khare is an Indian actress who works in Hindi television. She is best known for her role as Mahima Srinivasan Khurana in Star Plus's romantic drama Yeh Hai Chahatein and Lakshmi Bajwa in Zee TV's romantic drama Bhagya Lakshmi.

== Early life ==
Aishwarya Khare, born 17 April 1995, hails from Bhopal, Madhya Pradesh. She is a beauty pageant winner and a theater artist. She undertook her early education in Bhopal, at Bonnie Foi School and St. Theresa's Girl's School.

== Career ==
Khare made her acting debut in 2014 through producer director Lal Vijay Shahdeo's drama series Yeh Shaadi Hai Ya Sauda on DD National. The series ran for more than 300 episodes.

In 2016, Khare played the parallel lead in drama series Jaane Kya Hoga Rama Re which aired on Life OK. In 2016, she played the role of Aparajita in Zee TV’s supernatural drama series Vishkanya Ek Anokhi Prem Kahani.

She then went on to play the role of a police officer in Beta Bhagya Se Bitiya Saubhagya Se aired in Doordarshan. Later on, she played the lead in political drama Saam Daam Dand Bhed as Bulbul Namdhari, Vijay's wife and love interest.

In 2019, she was roped in by Ekta Kapoor for cameo in her drama series Yeh Hai Chahatein on StarPlus where she played the role of Mahima Srinivasan, sister of the protagonist, later on her role turned into an antagonist. It was her first noticeable role on Indian television and her performance as an antagonist was appreciated by audience. In 2020, she was cast as Meera Sharma, Bani's adoptive sister in Naagin 5.

From August 2021 to June 2025, Khare is portraying the role of protagonist Lakshmi Oberoi in Ekta Kapoor's drama series Bhagya Lakshmi on Zee TV. It was her third collaboration with Balaji Telefilms.

In August 2025 she participated in her first reality show Chhoriyan Chali Gaon. However after three weeks, she quit due to overwhelming physical and mental stress from the challenges.

== Filmography ==
=== Television ===
Year	Serial	Role	Notes	Ref.
2014	Yeh Shaadi Hai Ya Sauda	Ambika		
2016	Jaane Kya Hoga Rama Re	Rashmi		
2016	Vishkanya Ek Anokhi Prem Kahani	Aparajita Mittal	Lead Role	
2016	Beta Bhagya Se Bitiya Saubhagya Se	Mamata		
2017–2018	Saam Daam Dand Bhed	Bulbul Namdhari	Lead Role	
2018	Shatada Prem Karave	Asmita Patil	Marathi Series	
2019–2021	Yeh Hai Chahatein	Mahima Srinivasan Khurana	Antagonist	
2019	Laal Ishq	Maya	Episode: "Mundi Ka Tandav"	
2019	Laal Ishq	Radha	Episode: "Ashtabhuji Danav"	
2019	Laal Ishq	Roshni	Episode: "Shikari Kauwa"	
2020–2021	Naagin 5	Meera Sharma Singhania	Supporting Role	
2021–2025	Bhagya Lakshmi	Lakshmi Oberoi	Lead Role	
2023	Bollystar Vacation	Herself	Special appearance	
2025	Chhoriyan Chali Gaon	Contestant		
2026	Mannat – Har Khushi Paane Ki	Dr. Aarambhi Chaudhary Tandon	Guest appearance	
2026–present	Dr. Aarambhi	Dr. Aarambhi Chaudhary Tandon	Lead role	

=== Music video ===
Year	Title	Singer(s)	Ref.
2025	Chaap Tilak	Arpit Chakraborty, Mujtaba Aziz	
