= Abhishek Nigam =

Indian actor (born 1997)

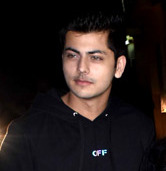
- Nigam in 2019
- Born: 13 September 1997 (age 29); Prayagraj, Uttar Pradesh, India
- Occupation: Actor
- Years active: 2015–present
- Known for: Akbar – Rakht Se Takht Ka Safar; Hero – Gayab Mode On; Ali Baba: Ek Andaaz Andekha
- Mother: Vibha Nigam
- Relatives: Siddharth Nigam (brother)

Abhishek Nigam (born 13 September 1997) is an Indian actor who works in Hindi television. He is known for portraying Akbar in Akbar – Rakht Se Takht Ka Safar, Veer Nanda in Hero – Gayab Mode On and Ali Baba in Ali Baba: Ek Andaaz Andekha.

== Early life ==
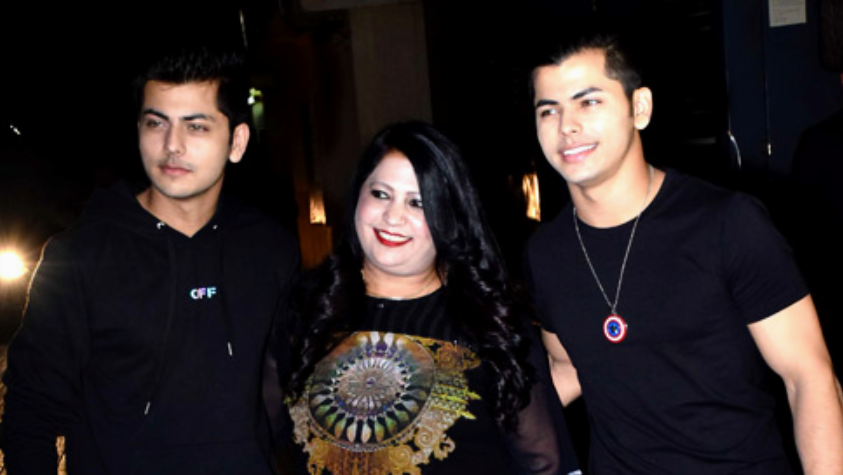
Abhishek Nigam with his family at a special screening of Panipat

Nigam was born and raised in Prayagraj, Uttar Pradesh. His father, Ramvir Tokas, died during Nigam's childhood, he was raised under the care of his mother. He also has a younger brother, Siddharth Nigam, who is a well-known actor. He completed his early education at Delhi Public School (DPS), Prayagraj, before moved to Pune for higher studies. There, he earned a master's degree in law from New Law College. Later, he relocated to Mumbai to pursue a career in acting.

== Career ==
Abhishek Nigam made his film debut in 2015 with the short documentary India’s Daughter, which marked his first screen appearance. In 2017, he made his television debut with Akbar – Rakht Se Takht Ka Safar. In the same year, he played supporting roles in Mere Sai - Shraddha Aur Saburi, Chandra Nandini, and Paramavatar Shri Krishna.

In October 2019, Nigam launched the music label Bon Bros Records with his brother, Siddharth. Under the label, he directed several music videos, including Attachment, Tu Mera Bhai Hai, and Hasdi Reya Kar. Later, he ventured into lyricism and music composition with the song Meri Hai Maa.

In December 2019, Nagam debuted in Bollywood with Ashutosh Gowariker's Panipat, where he played Vishwasrao Peshwa. From 2020 to 2021, he portrayed the role of Veer "Hero" Nanda in SAB TV's Hero – Gayab Mode On, opposite Yesha Rughani and Tunisha Sharma. In 2023, he replaced Sheezan Khan as the titular character in the second season of Sony SAB's Ali Baba. Later that year, he played Chirag, a nerd, in Amazon miniTV's anthology series Jab We Matched. In 2024, he starred in Sony TV's Pukaar – Dil Se Dil Tak.

== Media image ==
In August 2022, Nigam was named one of 75 cultural ambassadors by the Ministry of Culture to commemorate the 75th Anniversary of Indian Independence.

== Filmography ==
=== Films ===
Year	Title	Role	Notes	Ref.
2019	Panipat	Vishwasrao Peshwa	Debut	

=== Television ===
Year	Title	Role	Notes	Ref.
2017	Akbar – Rakht Se Takht Ka Safar	Akbar		
2017	Mere Sai - Shraddha Aur Saburi	Young Sai Baba	Cameo	
2017	Chandra Nandini	Rajkumar Bhadraketu	Recurring role	
2017	Paramavatar Shri Krishna	Teenage Krishna	Cameo	
2019	Ace of Space 2	Himself	Episode 72	
2020–2021	Hero – Gayab Mode On	Veer Nanda/Hero		
2023	Ali Baba: Ek Andaaz Andekha	Ali Baba		
2023	Jab We Matched	Chirag	Episode 1: "Dating Algorithm"	
2024	Pukaar – Dil Se Dil Tak	Sagar Maheshwari		

=== Music videos ===
Year	Title	Singer(s)	Refs
2020	Sun Le Saathiya	Stebin Ben	
2020	Tu Mera Bhai Hai	Ravish Khanna	
2020	Tere Hi Ghar Ke	Yasser Desai	
2020	Dil Kahe	Yasser Desai	
2020	Meri Hai Maa	Tarsh	
2021	Hasdi Reya Kar	Gurnazar	
2021	Tum Bin	Palak Muchhal	
2021	Lockdown Main Mora Saiyaan	Antara Mitra, Kettan Singh	
2021	Majnu	Sukriti Kakar, Prakriti Kakar, Mellow D	
2022	Heeriye	Abhi Dutt	
2022	Yeh Adah	Stebin Ben	
2023	Meri Aashiqui	Saaj Bhatt	
2023	Burqa	Salman Ali	

== Awards and nominations ==
Year	Award	Category	Work	Result	Ref.
2022	21st Indian Television Academy Awards	Best Actor (Popular)	Hero – Gayab Mode On	Nominated	
2022	Nickelodeon Kids' Choice Awards India	Favourite Sibling Jodi (With Siddharth Nigam)	—N/a	Nominated	
2022	22nd Indian Television Academy Awards	Popular Actor (Drama)	Hero – Gayab Mode On	Nominated	
