= Manul Chudasama =

Indian television actress (born 1998/99)

Manul Chuda
- Born: 1998/99; Rajkot, Gujarat, India
- Citizenship: Indian
- Occupation: Actress
- Years active: 2019–present

Manul Chuda is an Indian television actress. She made her television debut in 2019 by playing lead role of Rani in Ek Thi Rani Ek Tha Raavan. In same year she portrayed Princess Amrapali in Tenali Rama.

== Career ==
Manul Chuda started her career through television commercials. Manul made her debut in television with Ek Thi Rani Ek Tha Raavan in 2019. She played the protagonist, Rani, opposite Sheezan Mohammed Khan. Later she was replaced from the series for "not being sensuous enough" claims by makers. Later on she played Princess Amrapali in Sony SAB's Tenali Rama in the same year.

In 2022 she played lead role of Goddess Radha in Dangal's Brij Ke Gopal opposite Paras Arora but it went off-air soon in the same year.

In February 2023 she stepped into the shoes of actress Tunisha Sharma as Princess Mariam in Sony SAB's Ali Baba opposite Abhishek Nigam after Sharma's demise.

== Filmography ==
=== Television ===
Year	Show	Role	Notes	Ref.
2019	Ek Thi Rani Ek Tha Raavan	Rani		
2019–2020	Tenali Rama	Princess Amrapali		
2022	Brij Ke Gopal	Goddess Radha		
2023	Ali Baba	Princess Mariam aka Marjina	Chapter 2- Ek Andaaz Andekha	
