= Wikisource =

Free online library on a wiki

- The current Wikisource logo

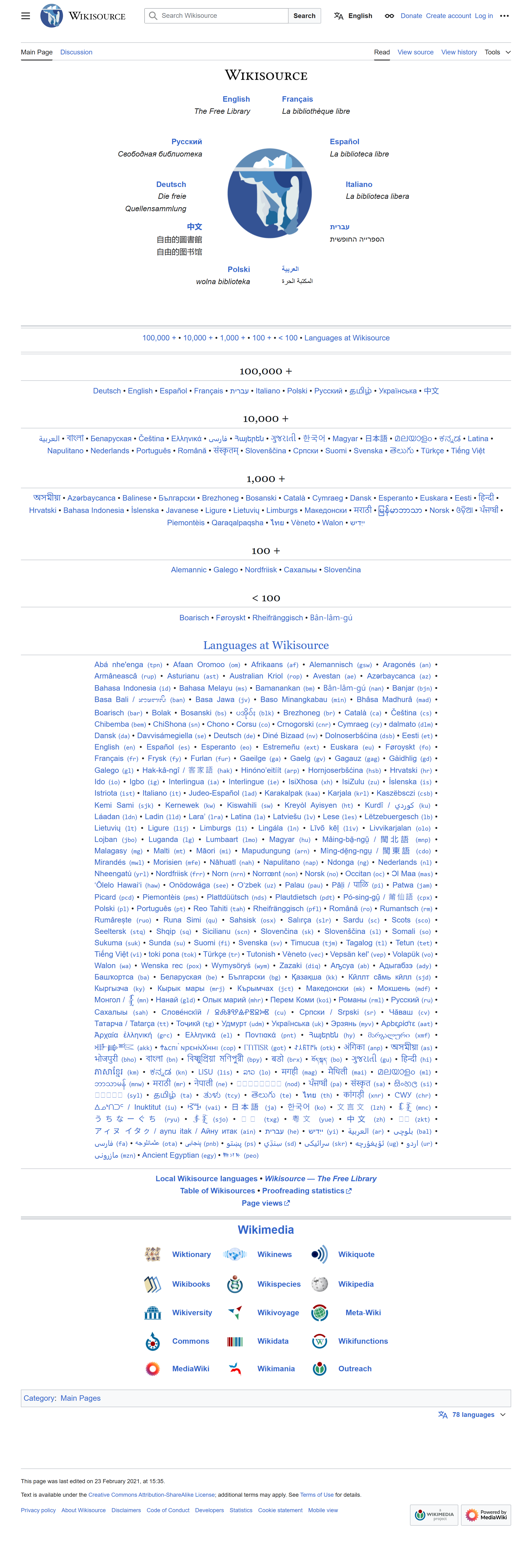
- Screenshot Detail of the Wikisource multilingual portal main page
- Website type: Digital library
- Available in: Multilingual (83 active sub-domains)
- Owner: Wikimedia Foundation
- Creator: User-generated
- Website: wikisource.org
- Commercial: No
- Registration: Optional
- Launched: November 24, 2003; 22 years ago
- Current status: Online

Wikisource is an online wiki-based digital library of free-content textual sources operated by the Wikimedia Foundation. Wikisource is the name of the project as a whole; it is also the name for each instance of that project, one for each language. The project's aim is to host all forms of free text, in many languages, and translations. Originally conceived as an archive to store useful or important historical texts, it has expanded to become a general-content library. The project officially began on November 24, 2003, under the name Project Sourceberg, a play on Project Gutenberg. The name Wikisource was adopted later that year and it received its own domain name.

The project holds works that are either in the public domain or freely licensed: professionally published works or historical source documents, not vanity products. Verification was initially made offline, or by trusting the reliability of other digital libraries. Now works are supported by online scans via the ProofreadPage extension, which ensures the reliability and accuracy of the project's texts.

Some individual Wikisources, each representing a specific language, now only allow works backed up with scans. While the bulk of its collection are texts, Wikisource as a whole hosts other media, from comics to film to audiobooks. Some Wikisources allow user-generated annotations, subject to the specific policies of the Wikisource in question. The project has come under criticism for lack of reliability but it is also cited by organisations such as the National Archives and Records Administration.

As of September 2026, there are Wikisource subdomains active for 83 languages comprising a total of 10,599,900 articles and 3,747 recently active editors.

== History ==
The original concept for Wikisource was as storage for useful or important historical texts. These texts were intended to support Wikipedia articles, by providing primary evidence and original source texts, and as an archive in its own right. The collection was initially focused on important historical and cultural material, distinguishing it from other digital archives like Project Gutenberg.

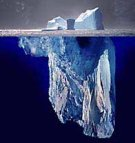
The original Wikisource logo

The project was originally called Project Sourceberg during its planning stages (a play on words for Project Gutenberg).

In 2001, there was a dispute on Wikipedia regarding the addition of primary-source materials, leading to edit wars over their inclusion or deletion. Project Sourceberg was suggested as a solution to this. In describing the proposed project, user The Cunctator said, "It would be to Project Gutenberg what Wikipedia is to Nupedia", soon clarifying the statement with "we don't want to try to duplicate Project Gutenberg's efforts; rather, we want to complement them. Perhaps Project Sourceberg can mainly work as an interface for easily linking from Wikipedia to a Project Gutenberg file, and as an interface for people to easily submit new work to PG." Initial comments were skeptical, with Larry Sanger questioning the need for the project, writing "The hard question, I guess, is why we are reinventing the wheel, when Project Gutenberg already exists? We'd want to complement Project Gutenberg—how, exactly?", and Jimmy Wales adding "like Larry, I'm interested that we think it over to see what we can add to Project Gutenberg. It seems unlikely that primary sources should in general be editable by anyone — I mean, Shakespeare is Shakespeare, unlike our commentary on his work, which is whatever we want it to be."

The project began its activity at ps.wikipedia.org. The contributors understood the "PS" subdomain to mean either "primary sources" or Project Sourceberg. However, this resulted in Project Sourceberg occupying the subdomain of the Pashto Wikipedia (the ISO language code of the Pashto language is "ps").

Project Sourceberg officially launched on November 24, 2003, when it received its own temporary URL, at sources.wikipedia.org, and all texts and discussions hosted on ps.wikipedia.org were moved to the temporary address. A vote on the project's name changed it to Wikisource on December 6, 2003. Despite the change in name, the project did not move to its permanent URL (http://wikisource.org/) until July 23, 2004.

== Logo and slogan ==
Since Wikisource was initially called "Project Sourceberg", its first logo was a picture of an iceberg. Two votes conducted to choose a successor were inconclusive, and the original logo remained until 2006. Finally, for both legal and technical reasons—because the picture's license was inappropriate for a Wikimedia Foundation logo and because a photo cannot scale properly—a stylized vector iceberg inspired by the original picture was mandated to serve as the project's logo.

The first prominent use of Wikisource's slogan—The Free Library—was at the project's multilingual portal, when it was redesigned based upon the Wikipedia portal on August 27, 2005, (historical version). As in the Wikipedia portal the Wikisource slogan appears around the logo in the project's ten largest languages.

Clicking on the portal's central images (the iceberg logo in the center and the "Wikisource" heading at the top of the page) links to a list of translations for Wikisource and The Free Library in 60 languages.

== Tools built ==
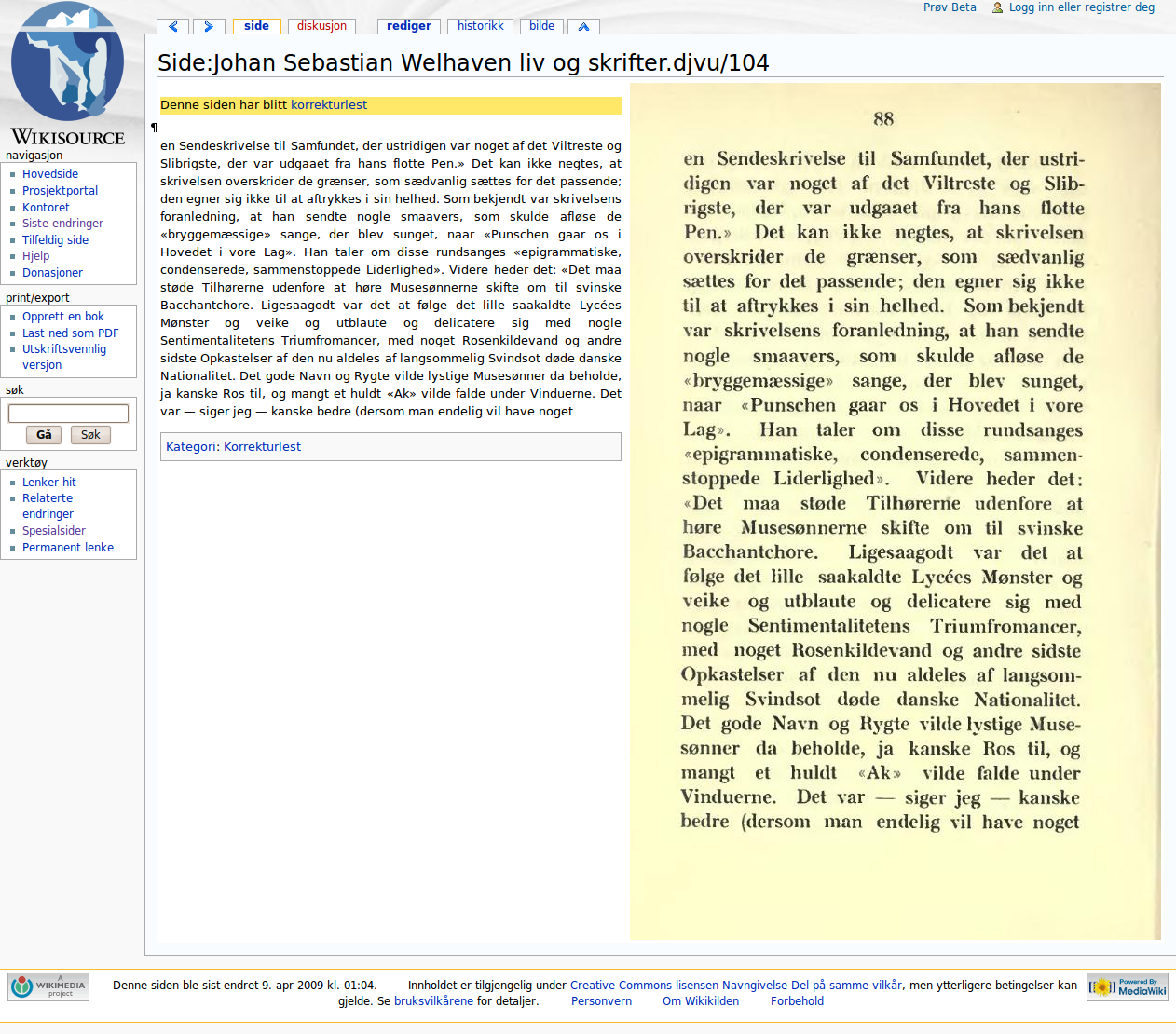
The ProofreadPage extension in action

A MediaWiki extension called ProofreadPage was developed for Wikisource by developer ThomasV to improve the vetting of transcriptions by the project. This displays pages of scanned works side by side with the text relating to that page, allowing the text to be proofread and its accuracy later verified independently by any other editor. Once a book, or other text, has been scanned, the raw images can be modified with image processing software to correct for page rotations and other problems. The retouched images can then be converted into a PDF or DjVu file and uploaded to either Wikisource or Wikimedia Commons.

This system assists editors in ensuring the accuracy of texts on Wikisource. The original page scans of completed works remain available to any user so that errors may be corrected later and readers may check texts against the originals. ProofreadPage also allows greater participation, since access to a physical copy of the original work is not necessary to be able to contribute to the project once images have been uploaded.

== Milestones ==
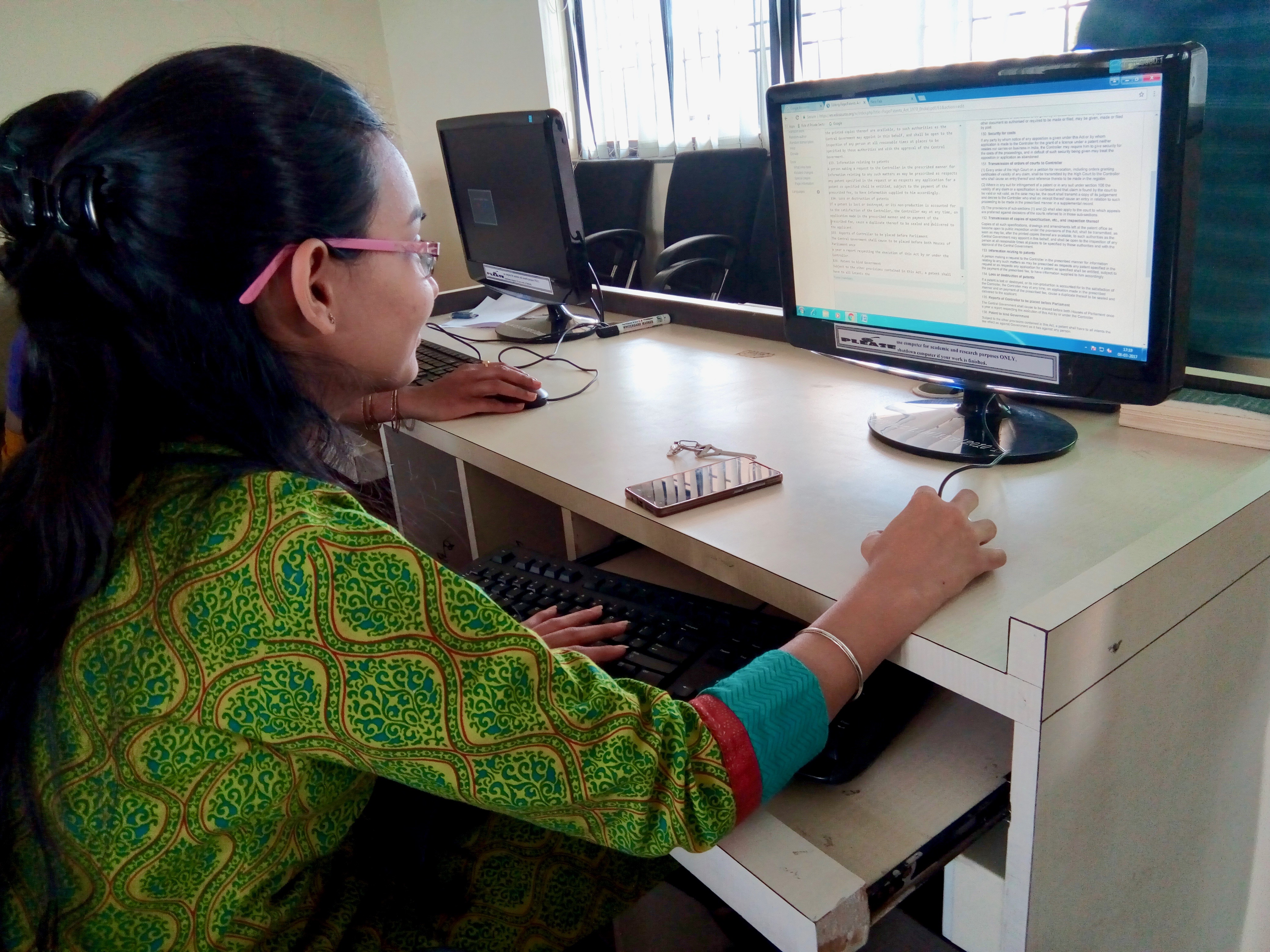
A student doing proof reading during her project at New Law College in Pune, India

Within two weeks of the project's official start at sources.wikipedia.org, over 1,000 pages had been created, with approximately 200 of these being designated as actual articles. On January 4, 2004, Wikisource welcomed its 100th registered user. In early July, 2004 the number of articles exceeded 2,400, and more than 500 users had registered.

On April 30, 2005, there were 2667 registered users (including 18 administrators) and almost 19,000 articles. The project passed its 96,000th edit that same day.

On November 27, 2005, the English Wikisource passed 20,000 text-units in its third month of existence, already holding more texts than did the entire project in April (before the move to language subdomains).

On May 10, 2006, the first Wikisource Portal was created.

On February 14, 2008, the English Wikisource passed 100,000 text-units with Chapter LXXIV of Six Months at the White House, a memoir by painter Francis Bicknell Carpenter.

In November, 2011, 250,000 text-units milestone was passed.

== Library contents ==
Wikisource inclusion criteria expressed as a Venn diagram. Green indicates the best possible case, where the work satisfies all three primary requirements. Yellow indicates acceptable but not ideal cases.

Wikisource collects and stores in digital format previously published texts; including novels, non-fiction works, letters, speeches, constitutional and historical documents, laws and a range of other documents. All texts collected are either free of copyright or released under the Creative Commons Attribution/Share-Alike License. Texts in all languages are welcomed, as are translations. In addition to texts, Wikisource hosts material such as comics, films, recordings and spoken-word works. All texts held by Wikisource must have been previously published; the project does not host "vanity press" books or documents produced by its contributors.

A scanned source is preferred on many Wikisources and required on some. Most Wikisources will, however, accept works transcribed from offline sources or acquired from other digital libraries. The requirement for prior publication can also be waived in a small number of cases if the work is a source document of notable historical importance. The legal requirement for works to be licensed or free of copyright remains constant.

=== Annotations and translations – the difference to Wikibooks ===
The only original pieces accepted by Wikisource are annotations and translations. Wikisource, and its sister project Wikibooks, has the capacity for annotated editions of texts. On Wikisource, the annotations are supplementary to the original text, which remains the primary objective of the project. By contrast, on Wikibooks the annotations are primary, with the original text as only a reference or supplement, if present at all. Annotated editions are more popular on the German Wikisource. The project also accommodates translations of texts provided by its users. A significant translation on the English Wikisource is the Wiki Bible project, intended to create a new, "laissez-faire translation" of The Bible.

== Structure ==
=== Language subdomains ===
A separate Hebrew version of Wikisource (he.wikisource.org) was created in August 2004. The need for a language-specific Hebrew website derived from the difficulty of typing and editing Hebrew texts in a left-to-right environment (Hebrew is written right-to-left). In the ensuing months, contributors in other languages including German requested their own wikis, but a December vote on the creation of separate language domains was inconclusive. Finally, a second vote that ended May 12, 2005, supported the adoption of separate language subdomains at Wikisource by a large margin, allowing each language to host its texts on its own wiki.

An initial wave of 14 languages was set up on August 23, 2005. The new languages did not include English, but the code en: was temporarily set to redirect to the main website (wikisource.org). At this point the Wikisource community, through a mass project of manually sorting thousands of pages and categories by language, prepared for a second wave of page imports to local wikis. On September 11, 2005, the wikisource.org wiki was reconfigured to enable the English version, along with 8 other languages that were created early that morning and late the night before. Three more languages were created on March 29, 2006, and then another large wave of 14 language domains was created on June 2, 2006.

Languages without subdomains are locally incubated. As of September 2020, 182 languages are hosted locally.

As of September 2026, there are Wikisource subdomains for 85 languages of which 83 are active and 2 are closed. The active sites have 10,599,900 articles and the closed sites have 13 articles. There are 5,371,616 registered users of which 3,747 are recently active.

Top ten Wikisource language projects by mainspace article count:
No.	Language	Wiki	Good	Total	Edits	Admins	Users	Active users	Files
1	Chinese	zh	4,081,880	7,718,029	10,072,822	9	123,693	259	230
2	Polish	pl	1,330,491	1,371,784	4,184,692	14	42,358	70	127
3	English	en	1,130,710	4,875,637	16,308,039	20	3,310,774	649	16,652
4	French	fr	714,443	4,825,271	16,054,540	17	166,105	299	4,457
5	German	de	654,848	713,765	5,058,840	16	91,625	175	6,933
6	Russian	ru	623,896	1,143,784	5,750,785	5	136,208	106	33,432
7	Ukrainian	uk	401,921	571,710	1,108,988	5	22,724	124	139
8	Hebrew	he	261,401	1,682,054	3,082,528	16	46,427	130	594
9	Italian	it	225,160	881,299	3,901,858	9	82,176	93	675
10	Arabic	ar	94,446	292,698	620,984	5	72,997	62	4,023

=== wikisource.org ===
During the move to language subdomains, the community requested that the main wikisource.org website remain a functioning wiki, in order to serve three purposes:

1. To be a multilingual coordination site for the entire Wikisource project in all languages. In practice, use of the website for multilingual coordination has not been heavy since the conversion to language domains. Nevertheless, there is some policy activity at the Scriptorium, and multilingual updates for news and language milestones at pages such as Wikisource:2007.
2. To be a home for texts in languages without their own subdomains, each with its own local main page for self-organization. As a language incubator, the wiki currently provides a home for over 30 languages that do not yet have their own language subdomains. Some of these are very active, and have built libraries with hundreds of texts (such as Volapük).
3. To provide direct, ongoing support by a local wiki community for a dynamic multilingual portal at its Main Page, for users who go to http://wikisource.org. The current Main Page portal was created on August 26, 2005, by ThomasV, who based it upon the Wikipedia portal.

The idea of a project-specific coordination wiki, first realized at Wikisource, also took hold in another Wikimedia project, namely at Wikiversity's Beta Wiki. Like wikisource.org, it serves Wikiversity coordination in all languages, and as a language incubator, but unlike Wikisource, its Main Page does not serve as its multilingual portal.

== Reception ==
Personal explanation of Wikisource from a project participant

Wikipedia co-founder Larry Sanger criticised Wikisource and sister project Wiktionary in 2011, after he left the project, saying that their collaborative nature and technology means that there is no oversight by experts, and alleging that their content is therefore not reliable.

Bart D. Ehrman, a New Testament scholar and professor of religious studies at the University of North Carolina at Chapel Hill, has criticised the English Wikisource's project to create a user-generated translation of the Bible saying "Democratization isn't necessarily good for scholarship." Richard Elliott Friedman, an Old Testament scholar and professor of Jewish studies at the University of Georgia, identified errors in the translation of the Book of Genesis as of 2008.

In 2010, Wikimedia France signed an agreement with the Bibliothèque nationale de France (National Library of France) to add scans from its own Gallica digital library to French Wikisource. Fourteen hundred public domain French texts were added to the Wikisource library as a result via upload to the Wikimedia Commons. The quality of the transcriptions, previously automatically generated by optical character recognition (OCR), was expected to be improved by Wikisource's human proofreaders.

In 2011, the English Wikisource received many high-quality scans of documents from the US National Archives and Records Administration (NARA) as part of their efforts "to increase the accessibility and visibility of its holdings." Processing and upload to Commons of these documents, along with many images from the NARA collection, was facilitated by a NARA Wikimedian in residence, Dominic McDevitt-Parks. Many of these documents have been transcribed and proofread by the Wikisource community and are featured as links in the National Archives' own online catalog.

== See also ==
- Internet Archive – non-profit digital library
- Open Library – an online database and repository of books, created by the Internet Archive
