= Veebha Anand =

Indian actress

- Born: Vibha Anand; 8 September 1990 (age 36); Dehradun, Uttarakhand, India
- Occupations: Actress, model, host
- Years active: 2008–present
- Known for: Balika Vadhu; Mahabharat; Kaisi Yeh Yaariyan; Begusarai
- Height: 1.57 m (5 ft 2 in)

Veebha Anand is an Indian actress known for her portrayals of Sugna Shyam Singh in Balika Vadhu, Kangana in Shree, Laxmi Angad Purohit in Sanskaar Laxmi, Subhadra in Mahabharat, Navya Naveli in Kaisi Yeh Yaariaan, and Ananya Shakti Thakur in &TV's Begusarai.

== Early life ==
Vibha Anand was born on 8 September 1990 in Dehradun, Uttarakhand. She has a younger sister, Sakshi Anand, a writer and a brother, Ajeet Anand. She hails from a non-filmy background. Due to numerology, She changed her name to Veebha Anand from Vibha Anand. While this did not make any significant transformation in the pronunciation of her name, Veebha Anand replaced i with ee. She completed her schooling at Doon Presidency School, Uttarakhand.

== Personal life ==
Veebha Anand was in a relationship with TV actor Rohit Purohit. They met at the sets of their program Sanskaar Laxmi. After dating for some time, the couple decided to terminate their relationship and move into their individual lives.

== Career ==
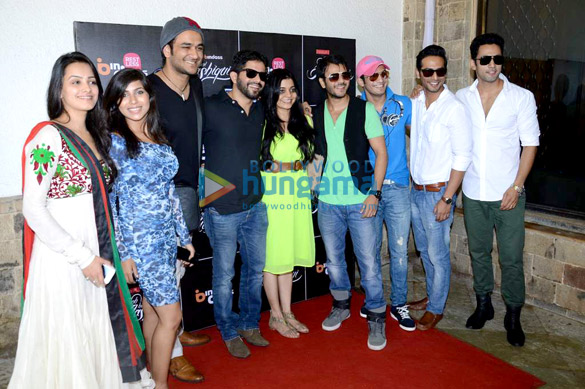
Veebha with the Yeh Hai Aashisqui cast

Veebha Anand started her journey into acting at a very young age of fifteen. Initially her journey was not easy as she had to struggle a lot but her father who supported her throughout her struggling phase. She joined the famous acting academy Kreating Charekters. She is the student of famous actors Samar Jai Singh and Roopesh Thapliyal. In 2008 after months of auditions, she got the opportunity to make her debut with the television serial Balika Vadhu as Sugna.

Veebha started her television career with the show Balika Vadhu in 2008, broadcast on Colors TV. Anand rose to fame for portraying the role of Sugna Shyam Singh. Her performance in the serial was loved by everyone making her a household name. She gained popularity and was nominated for the Indian Telly Awards for Best Actress in a Supporting Role and the Indian Television Academy Awards for Best Actress in a Supporting Role. Next she played a negative role in ZEE TV's supernatural drama show Shree. She acted as Namrata in Sukh by Chance in 2009. She debuted in the Thriller Film Stoneman Murders as Sanjay's daughter. She played the lead role in ZEE TV’s Sanskaar Laxmi as Laxmi Angad Purohit opposite Rohit Purohit and Shakti Arora.

Anand played a supporting role in the Bollywood Film Isi Life Me in 2011. Later she worked in several popular television shows such as Fear Files: Darr Ki Sacchi Tasvirein, Kairi-Rishta Khatta Meetha, Yeh Hai Aashiqui and Crime Patrol.

She was recognized for her role as Subhadra in Star Plus’s mythological TV series Mahabharat, opposite Shaheer Sheikh. She made an episodic appearance in MTV Webbed and Har Mushkil Ka Hal Akbar Birbal. She played Navya Naveli on MTV's youth show Kaisi Yeh Yaariaan opposite Abhishek Malik and Ayaz Ahmed. She played a teenage girl from a small town who gets betrayed by her boyfriend and gets pregnant. After betrayal she becomes a stronger persona. Then she appeared as Ananya Shakti Thakur in the Popular Soap Opera Begusarai opposite Vishal Aditya Singh, Ankit Gupta, Parichay Sharma, Manish Naggdev and Mukul Raj Singh. Her character in the Begusarai is inspired by Mahabharat's Draupadi. Anand made a cameo appearance in Karmaphal Dataa Shani. Anand made her web debut in the thriller Web Series Twistted 2 along with Nia Sharma and Rrahul Sudhir. She played a vital role in the series as a crime reporter. Anand is also featured in the Web Comedy Romantic Film Yours Truly Roohani opposite Rishi Saxena . Anand featured in the film Hum Chaar as Savita. Anand came for an episodic role in Laal Ishq. In 2020, Anand featured in the episodic web series Manohar Kahaniyan opposite Ankit Gupta as a new bride in the house. In the same year 2020, Anand starred in the Tamil language film Mookuthi Amman as Dharani. She first time acted on the other language films. In 2021, She played a prostitute in the web film Rajnigandha along with Rajesh Sharma. Rajnigandha is a heart-wrenching story of a father and daughter. She is currently seen in Disney+ Hotstar's horror-thriller web series Ankahi Ansuni opposite Paresh Pahuja.The series follows the story of a demoted young police inspector of the UP police who is transferred to a fictional sleepy town Jhaagi, notorious for having numerous unsolved mysterious cases. She will be seen playing the role of a police constable.

== Television ==
Year	Title	Role	Channel	Note	Ref.
2008–2010	Balika Vadhu	Sugna Bhairon Singh	Colors TV	Supporting Role	
2008–2009	Shree	Kangna	Zee TV	Negative Role	
2009–2010	Sukh by Chance	Namrata	Sony Entertainment Television	Parallel Lead Role	
2010	Meethi Choori No 1	Herself	Imagine TV	Contestant	
2011	Sanskaar Laxmi	Laxmi Angad Purohit	Zee TV	Lead Role	
2012	Fear Files: Darr Ki Sacchi Tasvirein	Sapna	Zee TV	Lead Role	
2012	Kairi - Rishta Khataa Meetha	Suman Abhay Sristav	Colors Tv	Supporting Role	
2012	Crime Patrol	Mitali Das ( Episode 146, 147)	Sony Entertainment Television	Parallel Lead Role	
2012	Gumrah	AIDS Patient	Channel V	Vital Role	
2013	MTV Webbed	Pankhudi	MTV	Parallel Lead Role	
2013	Yeh Hai Aashiqui -Season 1 (Episode 2: Tip Tip Barsa Pyaar)	Sapna	Bindass	Lead Role	
2013–2014	Mahabharat	Subhadra	Star Plus	Supporting Role	
2014–2015	Kaisi Yeh Yaariaan	Navya Naveli (Season 1 & 2)	MTV India	Parallel Lead Role	
2014	Akbar Birbal	Shaahin	Big Magic	Cameo appearance	
2016	Begusarai	Ananya Shakti Thakur	&TV	Lead Role	
2016	Karmaphal Dataa Shani	Mahakali	Colors TV	Cameo Appearance	
2018, 2019	Laal Ishq	Gunjan (Episode 1) / Sheel (Episode 51)	&TV	Lead Role	
2018	Jamai Raja	A Dancer at Navaratri Function	Zee TV	Cameo Appearance	
2020	Devi Adi Parashakti	Devasena	Dangal TV	supporting role	

== Theatre play ==
Year	Title	Role	Ref
2013	Rishton Ka Live Telecast	Shruti	

== Web series ==
Year	Title	Role	Note	Ref
2018	Twisted 2	Raashi	Parallel Lead Role	
2020	Manohar Kahaniyan	Priya	Lead Role ( Episode 1-3)	
2020	A Long Distance Love Story - Lockdown	Pari		
2021	Ankahi Ansuni	Barkhaa	Lead Role	
2021	Glitter	Anushkha	Lead Role	

== Films ==
Year	Tiltle	Role	Language	Note	Ref
2009	Stoneman Murders	Sanjay's daughter	Hindi	Supporting Role	
2010	Isi Life Mein	Nupur	Hindi	Supporting Role	
2011	Pratha	Shyamli	Hindi	Parallel Lead Role	
2019	Hum Chaar	Savita	Hindi	Supporting Role	
2020	Mookuthi Amman	Dharani	Tamil	Supporting Role	
2023	Rocky Aur Rani Kii Prem Kahaani	Young Jamini Chatterjee	Hindi	Supporting Role	

=== Short films ===
Year	Title	Ref
2019	The Gift	
2019	Cup of Tea - Madame	
2020	Under the Same Sky	
2020	Live After You Leave	
2021	Ulljahan	

== Web films ==
Year	Title	Role	Note	Ref
2018	Yours Truly Roohani	Roohani Diwan	Lead Role ( Short Film)	
2019	The Gift	Pari	Lead Role	{{[IMDb — The Gift (2019)](https://www.imdb.com/title/tt10213068/)}}
2020	Under The Same Sky		Actress And Director	
2021	Rajnigandha	Nazia/Muneer	Lead Role	
2025	Sheness	Shagun	Lead Role	

== Music videos ==
Year	Title	Opposite	Singer	Music	Ref
2017	Piya Saaware	Paras Arora & Utpal Das	Bornali Kalita	Times Music	
2017	Beparwaahiyaan 2	Suyyash Rai	Suyyash Rai	TheBucketlistFilms	
2018	Chaap Tilak	Non	YASH WADALI	TheBucketlistFilms	
2019	Jaanta Tha	Sanam Puri	Sanam Puri	Zill Music	
2019	Phir Se song	Bhavna Makhija	Siddharth Basrur	CreativeMeter	
2024	Tu Gayaa	Abhishek Tiwari	Vishal Mishra	RedBulb Music	

== Awards and nominations ==
Year	Award	Category	Show	Result	Ref
2009	Indian Telly Awards	Best Actress in a Supporting Role	Balika Vadhu	Nominated	
2010	Indian Television Academy Awards	Best Actress in a Supporting Role	Balika Vadhu	Nominated	

== See also ==
- List of Indian television actresses
