= Srishti Jain =

Indian television actress (born 1996)

- Born: 13 November 1996 (age 29); Bhopal, Madhya Pradesh, India
- Occupation: Actress
- Years active: 2016–present
- Known for: Meri Durga; Main Mayke Chali Jaungi; Kumkum Bhagya
- Partner: Shrey Gupta (2024–present)

Srishti Jain is an Indian television actress known for portraying Durga Chaudhary Ahlawat in Star Plus's Meri Durga and Jaya Sharma in Sony TV's Main Mayke Chali Jaungi.

== Early life ==
Jain was born on 13 November 1996 in Bhopal, Madhya Pradesh, India.

== Personal life ==
After dating businessman Shrey Gupta since 2024, Jain got engaged to him in a private ceremony in January 2026.

== Career ==
Jain starred as a child actor in War Chhod Na Yaar. She began TV career in 2016 with Suhani Si Ek Ladki as Krishna Mathur.

From July 2017 she played the titular character Durga Chaudhary Ahlawat in StarPlus's Meri Durga opposite Paras Kalnawat until the show went off-air in March 2018.

From 2018 to 2019, Jain portrayed Jaya Sharma opposite Namish Taneja in Sony Entertainment Television's Main Mayke Chali Jaungi.

Just after its end she was cast for Star Bharat's Ek Thi Rani Ek Tha Raavan as Mayura and then an episode of &TV's Laal Ishq as Yami.

She next starred in Zee TV's Hamari Wali Good News as the parallel lead, Navya Agnihotri. In 2023, she portrayed Tahira opposite Sumedh Mudgalkar in Sony SAB's Ali Baba and Ritika Sood in Sony Entertainment Television's Bade Achhe Lagte Hain 3. She portrayed lead role of Samaira in 2023 Punjabi movie Junior opposite Amiek Virk.

In January 2024, she was cast to play role of a young widow Priti in Colors TV's Chand Jalne Laga. However the show went off-air the following month. She was then cast to play the negative lead Monisha in Zee TV's Kumkum Bhagya alongside Abrar Qazi and Rachi Sharma, in the same month thus making her second collaboration with Balaji Telefilms after Bade Achhe Lagte Hain 3.

== Filmography ==
=== Films ===
Year	Title	Role	Language	Notes
2013	War Chhod Na Yaar	Nikki	Hindi	
2019	Penalty	Pooja	Hindi	
2023	Junior	Samaira	Punjabi	

=== Television ===
Year	Title	Role	Notes
2016–2017	Suhani Si Ek Ladki	Krishna Mathur	
2017–2018	Meri Durga	Durga Chaudhary Ahlawat	
2018–2019	Main Mayke Chali Jaungi	Jaya Sharma	
2019	Ek Thi Rani Ek Tha Raavan	Mayura/Rani	
2019	Laal Ishq	Yami	
2020–2021	Hamari Wali Good News	Navya Agnihotri	
2023	Ali Baba	Tahira	Chapter 2: Ek Andaaz Andekha
2023	Bade Achhe Lagte Hain 3	Ritika Sood	
2024	Chand Jalne Laga	Preeti	
2024–2025	Kumkum Bhagya	Monisha	
2025–2026	Ganga Mai Ki Betiyan	Sahana Sharma	

=== Music videos ===
Year	Title	Singer	Ref.
2022	Tera Rahoon	Amit Mishra	
