= Main Maike Chali Jaungi Tum Dekhte Rahiyo =

2018 Indian television series

- Genre: Dramedy; Romance
- Developed by: Ved Raj
- Directed by: Dheeraj Sarna
- Starring: See below
- Country of origin: India
- Original language: Hindi
- No. of episodes: 204

Production
- Producer: Ved Raj
- Production locations: Mumbai; Bhopal
- Production company: Kagaz Kalam Films

Original release
- Network: Sony Entertainment Television
- Release: 11 September 2018 – 10 July 2019

Main Maike Chali Jaungi, Tum Dekhte Rahiyo (transl. I will go to my parents home, you keep watching) is an Indian television series starring Namish Taneja, Srishti Jain and Neelu Vaghela. Created by Shoonya Square and produced by Dheeraj Sarna, it premiered on 11 September 2018 and aired on SET.

== Plot ==
This story primarily revolves around a daughter’s maternal and in-laws house. Jaya, Samar and Satya are the protagonists. Jaya has two other sisters named Shikha and Richa. Satya Devi is a divorce lawyer who becomes hardened after facing atrocities from her husband many years ago. Jaya, who is a wedding planner, and Satya’s daughter falls in love with Samar Surana and later marries him. At first, Satya refuses to let them marry as she considers all husbands bad (since her own husband was quite bad). Nevertheless, after creating a list of conditions with Samar’s mom, Rama, she agrees. The conditions include the Surana family giving Jaya half of their properties if the marriage doesn’t last. Both Samar and Jaya are unaware of this. However, when they both later find out about them, Jaya tears the papers. Satya always tells her daughter to listen and come to her maternal house over trivial issues between her and her in-laws. Jaya, although loving Samar always listens to her mom. This causes much tension within the families. Samar always goes back to pacify Jaya. At one point, this tension becomes so great that Samar and Jaya nearly get separated for good. It’s cause was with Satya accusing Sarika (Samar’s sister)’s husband of cheating on her. Although her intentions are good, Samar misunderstands them and kicks Jaya out of his house, that too on her birthday. Nevertheless, later, Samar finds out the truth and kicks Akash (Sarika’s husband) out of her life and goes to stay at Jaya’s house to convince her to go back to his house. However, Satya Devi’s interferences makes this harder. In the process of convincing Jaya, Samar also remarries Shikha and Richa to their ex-husbands which deeply hurts Satya. Later on, on Samar’s birthday, Satya accuses Samar of trying to kill her though he didn’t do so. In fact, Satya purposely put Samar’s hands on her throat and pretended to scream as if she was in pain. Jaya misunderstands this and hates Samar. Satya eventually wishes for Jaya to marry Dhruv Raichand, whom Jaya accepts. However, Jaya still deeply loves Samar though cannot express it, knowing what he has done. Samar's father, Gauri's friend Vicky arrives from the USA and takes it upon himself to fix everything. At last, Satya’s truths are revealed and Jaya and Samar unite. Satya also forgets her differences with the Surana family and saves Sarika in a false accusation made by Akash in wanting to kill him. Doing this, the Suranas also forgive her mistakes. Some time later, Vicky develops feelings for Satya. Nevertheless, Satya rejects him since they both are very old. Amarnath, Satya’s ex-husband, enters and fakes blood cancer to stay with Satya. Vicky finds out his true intentions and proves his love for her. Finally, they marry.

Although, their misunderstandings had been cleared, Satya still happens to insult the Suranas while not wishing any harm. Hence, Samar asks her to leave, enraging Jaya. Later, Shalini Nehra enters, claiming Samar as her 7-year-old son Jerry's father, and provides a fake DNA report. This makes Jaya even more mad and she leaves Samar’s house upon Satya’s order. Shalini fakes a suicide attempt to manipulate Samar into marriage. Satya and Vicky encounter her parents who tell her that they threw her out. Shalini is exposed; the father turns out to be Samar's ex-brother-in-law, Aakash. They're arrested. Jaya and Samar take Jerry in. In the last parts of the story, Satya is pregnant with Vicky's child and Jaya with Samar's child. Satya at first gets awkward as she is pregnant at an inappropriate age but reciprocates her feelings as the entire family supports her.

=== 9 months later ===
Jaya delivers a daughter and Satya has a son. Everyone lives happily ever after.

== Cast ==
=== Main ===
- Namish Taneja as Samar Gauri Shankar Surana: Rama and Gauri's son; Sarika's elder brother; Jaya's husband (2018–2019)
- Srishti Jain as Jaya Samar Surana (née Sharma): Satya and Amarnath's youngest daughter; Vikramjeet's step-daughter; Shikha and Richa's younger sister; Samar's wife (2018–2019)
- Neelu Vaghela as Advocate Satya Devi Sharma: Divorce lawyer; Savitri's daughter; Amarnath's ex-wife; Vikramjeet's wife; Jaya's mother; Kabir's grandmother (2018–2019)
- Vivek Mushran as Vikramjeet "Vicky" Singh: Gauri's childhood friend; Satya's second husband; Shikha, Richa and Jaya's step-father (2019)

=== Recurring ===
- Hemant Choudhary as Gauri Shankar Surana: Arvind's son; Uma's brother; Vikramjeet's friend; Rama's husband; Samar and Sarika's father
- Aditi Deshpande as Rama Surana: Gauri's wife; Samar and Sarika's mother
- Vaani Sharma as Sarika Surana: Rama and Gauri's daughter; Samar's younger sister; Akash's second ex-wife; Jerry's step-mother
- Ashok Lokhande as Amarnath Sharma: Satya's former husband; Shikha, Richa and Jaya's biological father; Kabir's grandfather
- Mahi Sharma as Shikha Suryavanshi: Satya and Amarnath's eldest daughter; Vikramjeet's step-daughter; Richa and Jaya's elder sister; Kartik's wife; Kabir's mother
- Mohsin Afroz Khan as Kartik Suryavanshi: Shikha's husband; Kabir's father
- Yachit Sharma as Kabir Suryavanshi: Kartik and Shikha's son
- Taruna Nirankari as Richa Sinha: Satya and Amarnath's second daughter; Vikramjeet's step-daughter; Shikha and Jaya's sister; Punit's wife
- Punit Dahima as Punit Sinha: Richa's husband
- Vishal Chaudary as Akash Sakhuja: Shalini and Sarika's former husband; Jerry's father and Vicky's brother
- Priom Gujjar as Vijay Surana: Prabha and Uma's son; Samar and Sarika's cousin; Jyoti's husband
- Dolly Chawla as Jyoti Surana: Vijay's wife
- Premnath Gulati as Arvind Shankar Surana: Gauri and Uma's father; Samar, Sarika and Vijay's grandfather
- Kapil Punjabi as Uma Shankar Surana: Arvind's son; Gauri's brother; Prabha's husband; Vijay's father
- Manisha Purohit as Prabha Surana: Uma's wife; Vijay's mother
- Vinod Goswami as Lalwant "Lallan" Singh: Manager of Suranas
- Lily Patel as Savitri Devi Khanna: Satya's mother; Shikha, Richa and Jaya's grandmother
- Ambika Soni as Shalini Sejwal: Akash's first wife; Jerry's mother
- Prayag Jain as Jerry Sakhuja: Shalini and Akash's son; Sarika's step-son
- Ruslaan Mumtaz as Dhruv Raichand: Shanaya's former boyfriend; Jaya's suitor
- Miloni Kapadia as Shanaya Raschitran: Dhruv's ex-girlfriend
- Ahmad Harhash as Vicky Sakhuja: Akash's brother
