= List of Ali Baba (TV series) episodes =

List of episode article for an Indian TV series

Ali Baba is an Indian fantasy television series based on the Arabian Nights character Ali Baba. The series follows the life of an orphan Alibaba, from the Mamuli Gali of Kabul, and the challenges he faces while he tries to protect and take care of five other orphan children. The series premiered on 22 August 2022 on Sony SAB and digitally streams on SonyLIV.

== Series overview ==
No. of season	No of episodes	Originally broadcast (India)	
No. of season	No of episodes	First aired	Last aired
1	126	22 August 2022	14 January 2023
2	113	16 January 2023	9 June 2023

== Episode list ==
=== Chapter 1: Dastaan-E-Kabul ===
No.	Title	Original release date
1	"40 Choro Ka Khauff"	22 August 2022
2	"Ali Baba Gets Flashbacks"	23 August 2022
3	"Shaitaan Se Jung"	24 August 2022
4	"Ali In Trouble"	25 August 2022
5	"Mamuli Gali"	26 August 2022
6	"Chand Pe Grahan"	27 August 2022
7	"Mazboot Hausla"	29 August 2022
8	"Imtihaan Ki Ghadi"	30 August 2022
9	"Return Of The Thieves"	31 August 2022
10	"Choro Ka Hamla"	1 September 2022
11	"Shezaadi Khatre Mein"	2 September 2022
12	"Princess On The Run"	3 September 2022
13	"Nayaab Zewar"	5 September 2022
14	"Search For Mariam"	6 September 2022
15	"Kabul Badal Gaya Hai"	7 September 2022
16	"Mariam In Trouble"	8 September 2022
17	"Baccho Ki Maangein"	9 September 2022
18	"Shehzaadi Ki Khoj"	10 September 2022
19	"Shehdidi"	12 September 2022
20	"Farewell To The Sultan"	13 September 2022
21	"Ali Meets Shehzaadi"	14 September 2022
22	"Kameez Chor"	15 September 2022
23	"Shehzaadi Gets Captured"	16 September 2022
24	"Jumma Bazaar"	17 September 2022
25	"Simsim's Betrayal"	19 September 2022
26	"Chaalis Choro Ka Hamla"	20 September 2022
27	"Kabul Ki Kismat"	21 September 2022
28	"Adhura Hissa"	22 September 2022
29	"Duaaon Ki Taakat"	23 September 2022
30	"Ali Gets Suspicious"	24 September 2022
31	"Ali Ka Muqqadar"	26 September 2022
32	"Yateem Khaane Ke Jabaaz"	27 September 2022
33	"Nakli Nayab"	28 September 2022
34	"Zindagi Ka Aaina"	29 September 2022
35	"Baccho Ki Fikr"	30 September 2022
36	"Ali's Sacrifice"	1 October 2022
37	"Takht Aur Taakat"	3 October 2022
38	"Satrangi Indradhanush"	4 October 2022
39	"Bawandar"	5 October 2022
40	"Naseeb Ka Khel"	6 October 2022
41	"Ali Ka Udan Khatola"	7 October 2022
42	"Kabul Ka Jaadugar"	8 October 2022
43	"Ali Ka Janaza"	10 October 2022
44	"Mariam's New Home"	11 October 2022
45	"Jadugar Ki Khoj"	12 October 2022
46	"Laal Kapda"	13 October 2022
47	"Sheer Yakh"	14 October 2022
48	"Dil Jeetne Ki Tarkeeb"	15 October 2022
49	"Josh O Kharosh"	17 October 2022
50	"Kale Jaadu Ki Taakat"	18 October 2022
51	"Sautele Bhaiyo Ka Rishta"	19 October 2022
52	"Indradhanush Ka Naksha"	20 October 2022
53	"Zoravar Ko Hua Shak"	21 October 2022
54	"Diwali Ke Kapde"	22 October 2022
55	"Parvaz Ki Peheli Diwali"	24 October 2022
56	"Diwali Ka Jaadu"	25 October 2022
57	"Sunehra Kal"	26 October 2022
58	"Kudrati Karishma"	27 October 2022
59	"Aman Sarai"	28 October 2022
60	"Hamle Ki Taiyaari"	29 October 2022
61	"Mariam's Revenge"	31 October 2022
62	"Haiwan Ka Hamla"	1 November 2022
63	"Madad Ka Paigam"	2 November 2022
64	"Kismat Ki Jaadui Takat"	3 November 2022
65	"Abaiz Ki Raat"	4 November 2022
66	"Simsim Finds The Wizard"	5 November 2022
67	"Chhalawa"	7 November 2022
68	"Simsim Ki Gufa"	8 November 2022
69	"Khulja Simsim"	9 November 2022
70	"Ali Ki Nayi Dastaan"	10 November 2022
71	"Khaas Maksad"	11 November 2022
72	"Kismat Ka Naya Khel"	12 November 2022
73	"Shahi Sadak Ka Jashan"	14 November 2022
74	"Chalis Choro Ka Khazana"	15 November 2022
75	"Simsim's Trap"	16 November 2022
76	"Ali's Misfortune"	17 November 2022
77	"Maut Ki Gufa"	18 November 2022
78	"Jaadugar Ki Talaash"	19 November 2022
79	"Iblis Ka Khaas Tohfa"	21 November 2022
80	"Parwaz Mein Dehshat"	22 November 2022
81	"Parwaz Ka Rakhwala"	23 November 2022
82	"Talisman Ki Taakat"	24 November 2022
83	"Choti Badi Musibatein"	25 November 2022
84	"Fakri Ka Hamla"	26 November 2022
85	"Khauf Ka Manzar"	28 November 2022
86	"Zehereela Paani"	29 November 2022
87	"Zeher Ka Ilaaj"	30 November 2022
88	"Ali Ki Akhri Ummeed"	1 December 2022
89	"Fakri Se Aamna Saamna"	2 December 2022
90	"Talisman Ka Istemaal"	3 December 2022
91	"Rakhwale Ka Sach"	5 December 2022
92	"Jadugar Ka Khel"	6 December 2022
93	"Khazane Ke Haqdaar"	7 December 2022
94	"Jokhim Bhara Raasta"	8 December 2022
95	"Kismat Se Juda Rishta"	9 December 2022
96	"Qasim Ki Hatya"	10 December 2022
97	"Janaze Ki Taiyaari"	12 December 2022
98	"Jadui Nishaan"	13 December 2022
99	"Parwaz Ki Dhaal"	14 December 2022
100	"Kale Jadu Ki Kitaab"	15 December 2022
101	"Baaz Ki Parchai"	16 December 2022
102	"Mustafa Ki Paheli"	17 December 2022
103	"Neela Darwaaza"	19 December 2022
104	"Tilismi Duniya"	20 December 2022
105	"Bhool Bhulaiyaa Ki Chaabi"	21 December 2022
106	"Noor Ka Asli Haqdaar"	22 December 2022
107	"Akhari Imtehaan"	23 December 2022
108	"Noor Aur Talisman"	24 December 2022
109	"Mariam Se Marjina Ka Safar"	26 December 2022
110	"Manhoos Khwaab"	27 December 2022
111	"Simsim Ka Aaghaaz"	28 December 2022
112	"Parwaz Par Kaala Saaya"	29 December 2022
113	"Putalo Ka Sheher"	30 December 2022
114	"Rakhwale Ki Khoj"	31 December 2022
115	"Nakaabposh Madadgaar"	2 January 2023
116	"Simsim Ka Kala Saaya"	3 January 2023
117	"Parwaz Ka Farishta"	4 January 2023
118	"Kale Jaadu Ka Asar"	5 January 2023
119	"Simi Jaan Ka Jaadu"	6 January 2023
120	"Noora Ka Sach"	7 January 2023
121	"Parwaz Mein Kushti Ka Mukaabla"	9 January 2023
122	"Mustafa Ki Kitaab"	10 January 2023
123	"Kitaab Ki Khoj"	11 January 2023
124	"Ali Ki Yaadein"	12 January 2023
125	"Pavitra Shakti"	13 January 2023
126	"Khoonkhaar Dian"	14 January 2023

=== Chapter 2: Ek Andaaz Andekha ===
No.	Title	Original release date
127	"Murdo Ki Nadi"	16 January 2023
128	"Bala Ki Gufa"	17 January 2023
129	"Farishta Vs Bala"	18 January 2023
130	"Ali Ka Naya Chehra"	19 January 2023
131	"Ali Ka Punar Janam"	20 January 2023
132	"The All-Seeing Sword"	21 January 2023
Ali uses the powers of the All-Seeing Sword to find out Simsim's plan. Simsim gets aggravated when she finds out that she only has a few days to save Iblis.
