= Madhurima Tuli =

Indian actress (born 1986)

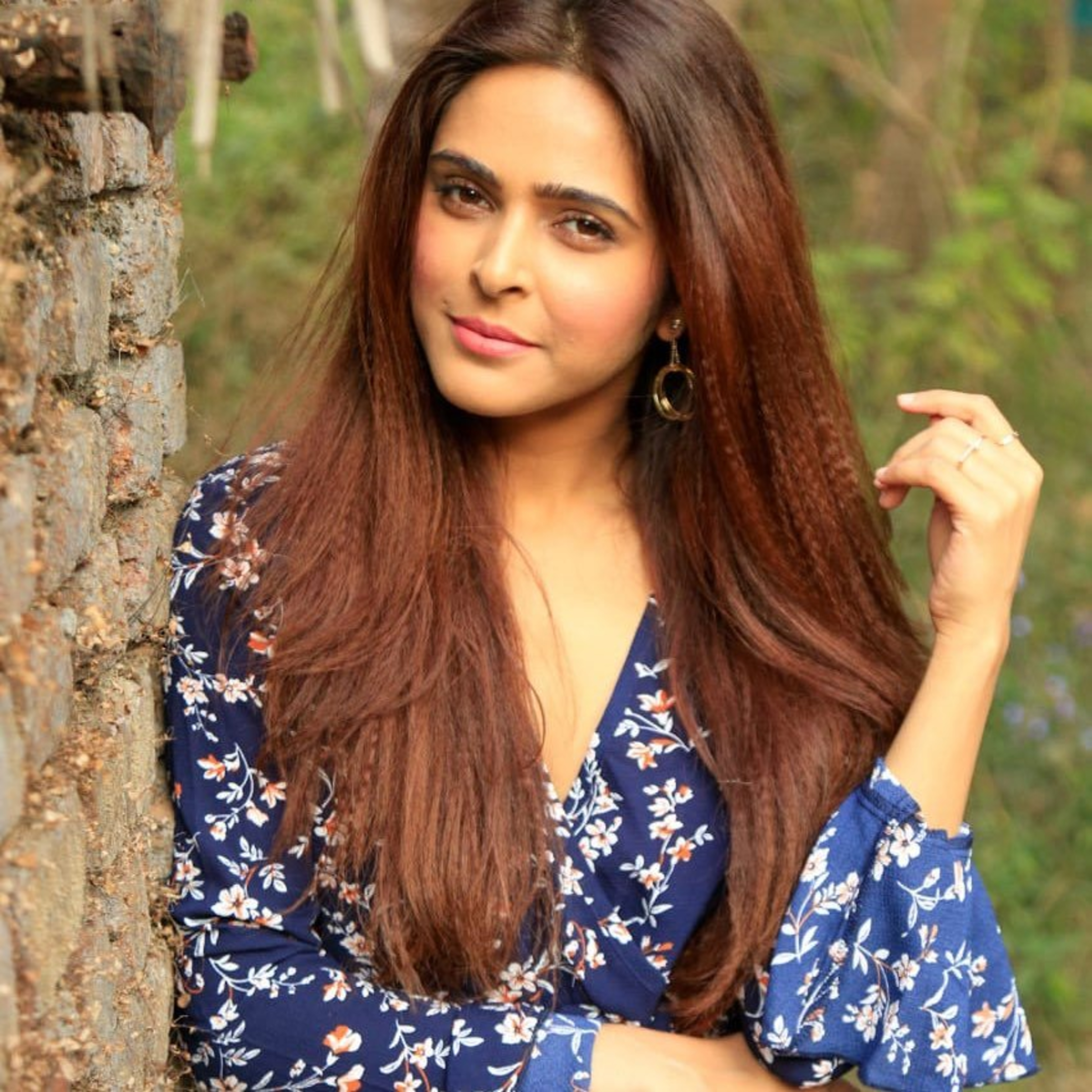
- Tuli in 2020
- Born: 19 August 1986 (age 40); Odisha, India
- Occupations: Actress; model
- Years active: 2007–present
- Known for: Chandrakanta; Baby; Nach Baliye 9; Bigg Boss 13

Madhurima Tuli (born 19 August 1986) is an Indian actress and model. Her works in Hindi television include the fiction dramas Kasturi, Parichay, Kumkum Bhagya, Chandrakanta and Qayamat Ki Raat and the reality shows Nach Baliye 9 and Bigg Boss 13. She also starred in popular Hindi films such as Baby, Hamari Adhuri Kahani and Naam Shabana.

== Early life ==
Tuli was born in Odisha on 19 August 1986. She hails from Dehradun, Uttarakhand. She won the Miss Uttraranchal contest when in college. Her father works for Tata Steel and her mother for an NGO. She has a younger brother Shrikant Tuli, who owns a Music Label SVMT Music.

== Career ==
Tuli made an early debut in the Telugu film Saththaa (2004) opposite Sai Kiran. She moved to Mumbai and studied acting at the Kishore Namit Kapoor Acting School, worked as a model doing advertisements for brands like Godrej, Fiama Di Wills, Airtel, Lenovo, UltraTech Cement, Domino's Pizza and Karbonn Mobiles.

In 2008, she played a supporting role as the pretty girl Satya in Homam, an Indian thriller written and directed by J. D. Chakravarthy, and to some extent inspired by the 2006 Hollywood movie The Departed, directed by Martin Scorsese.

Toss (2009) was her next film in the role of Sherry, and after the small role as Bindiya in Zee TV's supernatural soap opera Shree (2008-2009), Tuli played the aspiring model Kushi in STAR One's TV series Rang Badalti Odhani (2010-2011).

Tuli had a lead as newly married Rukmini in Kaalo (2010). It was screened at the 6th Annual South African Halloween Horror Festival in Cape Town, where it won the best feature film and best cinematography award. Together with Dino Morea as her partner, she took part in the third season of Fear Factor: Khatron Ke Khiladi, a reality show filmed in Brazil and broadcast by Aapka Colors

Tuli had a leading role in Cigarette Ki Tarah (2012) along with Prashant Narayanan, and as the female lead Natasha in Anik Singal's English language short film Lethal Commission (2012).

She starred in the film Maaricha (2012), directed by K. Sivasurya. The film was simultaneously made in Kannada and Tamil and had Mithun Tejasvi playing the lead actor opposite Tuli.

Tuli played Gunjan Dutta in the Hindi thriller 3D film Warning (2013). She was seen playing the lead role in the film Nimbe Huli, directed by Hemanth Hegde and produced by Subhash Ghai. The film had Hegde playing the lead role along with Tuli, Komal Jha and Nivedhitha. She also played the role of Anjali Singh Rajput (wife of Akshay Kumar) in the 2015 action film Baby. Tuli participated in Zee TV's reality show I Can Do That. She also played the antagonist role of Tanu in Kumkum Bhagya on Zee TV. Later she reprised her role of Anjali Singh Rajput in Naam Shabana—a spin-off of Baby (2015)—with Akshay Kumar, Anupam Kher, Taapsee Pannu, and Manoj Bajpayee. Her first Hollywood venture came in 2017 where she played the younger version of Shabana Azmi (Maharaja Duleep Singh's mother) in the film The Black Prince, which is based on the last king of the Sikh Empire Maharaja Duleep.

She then portrayed Princess Chandrakanta in Colors TV series Chandrakanta.

== Personal life ==
Tuli met actor Vishal Aditya Singh on the sets of her show Chandrakanta in 2017 and later dated him. They broke up after a year of dating in 2018.

== Filmography ==
=== Films ===
Key
†	Denotes films that have not yet been released

Madhurima Tuli film credits
Year	Title	Role	Language	Notes
2008	Homam	Satya	Telugu	
2008	Ellam Avan Seyal	Madhurima	Tamil	
2008	Bachna Ae Haseeno		Hindi	
2010	Kaalo	Rukmini	Hindi	
2011	Kya Karein Kya Na Karein	Nisha	Hindi	
2012	Lethal Commission	Natasha	English	Short film
2012	Maaricha		Kannada, Tamil	
2012	Cigarette Ki Tarah	Jessica	Hindi	
2013	Warning	Gunjan Dutta	Hindi	
2014	Nimbe Huli	Janaki	Kannada	
2015	My Self Pendu		Punjabi	Cameo
2015	Baby	Anjali Singh Rajput	Hindi	
2015	Hamari Adhuri Kahani	Avni Prasad	Hindi	Cameo
2017	Naam Shabana	Anjali Singh Rajput	Hindi	Cameo
2017	The Black Prince	Maharani Jinda	English; Hindi; Punjabi	
2020	Pasta	Nimmi	Hindi	Short film
2022	Jeena Abhi Baaki Hai		Hindi	Musical film
2025	Tehran	Vandana	Hindi	

=== Television ===
Madhurima Tuli television credits
Year	Title	Role	Notes
2007–2008	Kasturi	Tanu Singhania	
2008	Shree	Bindiya	
2009	Jhansi Ki Rani	Gayatri	
2010	Rang Badalti Odhani	Khushi Sharma	
2010	Fear Factor: Khatron Ke Khiladi 3	Contestant	2nd runner-up
2011	Parichay – Nayee Zindagi Kay Sapno Ka	Richa Thakral	
2014	Kumkum Bhagya	Tanushree "Tanu" Mehta	
2015	Daffa 420	Inspector Tanya Shivalay	
2015	I Can Do That	Contestant	2nd runner-up
2017	Savitri Devi College & Hospital	Naina	
2017–2018	Chandrakanta – Ek Mayavi Prem Gaatha	Princess Chandrakanta	
2018	Rasoi Ki Jung Mummyon Ke Sung	Herself	Guest
2018–2019	Qayamat Ki Raat	Sanjana	
2019	Nach Baliye 9	Contestant	2nd runner-up
2019–2020	Bigg Boss 13	Contestant	Entered on Day 63 & Ejected on Day 112)
2020	Ishq Mein Marjawan 2	Neha	
2020	The Kapil Sharma Show	Herself	Guest

=== Web series ===
Madhurima Tuli web series credits
Year	Title	Role	Ref.
2016	24	Dr. Devyani Bhowmick	
2018	26 January	Insiya	
2020	Avrodh: The Siege Within	Namrata Joshi	

=== Music videos ===
Madhurima Tuli music video credits
Year	Title	Singer	Label	Ref.
2020	Khwabeeda	Anurag Mohn	SVMT Music	
2022	Hayaa	Anurag Mohn	SVMT Music	

=== Theatres ===
Madhurima Tuli theatrical credits
Year	Work	Role	Ref.
2018	Surya Ki Antim Kiran Se Surya Ki Pehli Kiran Tak	Queen Sheelavathi	

== See also ==
- List of Hindi television actresses
- List of Indian film actresses
- List of Indian television actresses
