= Ali Baba (TV series) =

Indian fantasy television series

- Also known as: Ali Baba: Dastaan-E-Kabul Chapter 1 Ali Baba: Ek Andaaz Andekha Chapter 2
- Genre: Fantasy
- Created by: Alind Srivastava; Nisser Parvej
- Directed by: Maan Singh Manku; Ravi Bhushan
- Starring: Sheezan Khan; Tunisha Sharma; Karthik Jayaram; Sayantani Ghosh; Abhishek Nigam; Manul Chudasama; Aarav Chowdhary; Khushbu Rajendra
- Theme music composer: Souvyk Chakraborty
- Opening theme: "Ali Baba"
- Country of origin: India
- Original languages: Hindi; Urdu
- No. of seasons: 2
- No. of episodes: 239 (list of episodes)

Production
- Producers: Nissar Parvez; Alind Srivastava
- Camera setup: Multi-camera
- Running time: 19-25 minutes
- Production company: Peninsula Pictures

Original release
- Network: Sony SAB; Sony LIV
- Release: 22 August 2022 – 9 June 2023

Ali Baba is an Indian fantasy television series based on the Arabian Nights character Ali Baba. Produced by Alind Srivastava and Nissar Parvez under Peninsula Pictures, the series follows the life of an orphan Ali Baba, from the Mamuli Gali of Kabul, and the challenges he faces in trying to protect and care for five other orphaned children.

It starred Sheezan Khan, Tunisha Sharma, Karthik Jayaram and Sayantani Ghosh in the first season titled Ali Baba: Dastaan-e-Kabul: Chapter 1 (Translation - Ali Baba: Legend of Kabul: Chapter 1). It aired from 22 August 2022 to 14 January 2023 on Sony SAB and digitally streams on SonyLIV.

It starred Abhishek Nigam replacing Khan and Manul Chudasama replacing Tunisha as the leads in the new season titled Ali Baba: Ek Andaaz Andekha : Chapter 2 (Translation: Ali Baba: A Style Unseen : Chapter 2). It aired from 16 January 2023 to 9 June 2023.

== Series overview ==
No. of season	No of episodes	Originally broadcast (India)	
No. of season	No of episodes	First aired	Last aired
1	126	22 August 2022	14 January 2023
2	113	16 January 2023	9 June 2023

== Plot ==
=== Chapter 1: Dastaan-E-Kabul ===
Ali Baba is a poor, yet a very good person living with 5 adorable orphan children viz Gulrez, Poya, Imaad, Nafi and Alifi. He always gets flashbacks of when his father, the great magician Mustafa gets killed while destroying the Forty Thieves and their Leader, Iblis. However, he makes a prophecy that Ali will write and complete 'Legend of Kabul'. Simsim who loves and respects Iblis, decides to crack the moon to break the curse to get the Forty Thieves back and succeeds in it. Princess Mariam loses her father due to a fight between her father and her wicked uncle, Saddam; a cunning person who helps Simsim but wants to sit on the Throne. Later, Mariam escapes and after a lot of turns meets Ali.

They slowly develop feelings for each other and Ali, Mariam and the children reach Ali's home. Ali and Simsim come face to face but Ali wins the Talisman and becomes the Saviour of Parvaz. After a series of events, Ali Baba finally takes the treasure but Qasim had watched him. Then Qasim gets brutally killed by the Forty Thieves and Simsim and they hung him in the centre of Parvaz to give warning to the people. They also gave the note that if anyone gets him down then his whole family will die. So, for the sake of his family, Ali Baba can't gets Qasim down. But later Ali, in the form of Rakhwala, with the help of the Talisman provides proper burial to Qasim. Then, Ali Baba promises to finish Simsim and the Forty Thieves.

Ali Baba now tries to find a way to kill the Forty Thieves and Simsim once and for all. Then by solving clues of his father, Ali reaches his father's magical world and after a lot of turns meets his father who gives him the 'Noor' but warns him that the Noor works only with the Talisman. After returning, he discovers that Nazia has sold the Talisman. Ali goes to find the Talisman but gets to know from Nafi that Marjina has been captured. Then he decides to save Marjina's life first. On the quest to save Marjina, Ali fails and burns his face by the Forty Thieves and was left to die.

Simsim gets out of the cave by breaking the curse from sacrificing Marjina and enters Parvaz as Simijaan to catch the Rakhwala. She also captures Ali's grandmother. Very soon, she enters Mustafa's magical world to find her answers and again comes face to face with Mustafa.

=== Chapter 2: Ek Andaaz Andekha ===
Simsim asks Mustafa who the Rakhwala is and he answers that his son, Ali is. At the same time, Alifi saves Noora Dadi and burns the entrance to Mustafa's world to finish Simsim but fails. Ali gets the cure. He then returns to Parvaz as Chota Kotwal to find Simsim. Very soon, Ali imprisons Simsim and gets to know the real place of Marjina. Then he finds Marjina but is shocked to see that Marjina has lost her memory. Ali gets to know that the Prince of Ras Al Khaimah is responsible for Marjina losing her memory and after a lot of turns, Ali defeated the Prince and takes Marjina back to Parvaz. The children also fall in danger but ultimately succeeds and returns to Parwaaz.

On the way, Ali and Marjina unknowingly disturb a marriage as a headless woman comes and takes the groom. To help the people and to free the groom, Ali makes a plan to catch the headless woman. On the other hand, the children goes to find the Talisman and ends up in the Snake World. On the other hand, Ali promises to find the head of the headless woman and succeeds. Simsim is freed by the Forty Thieves. Simsim then seeks to take revenge on Ali. Ali goes in search of Marjina's memories. Ali then gives the memory of Marjina to her and she recalls everything but questions about Ali's face but Ali explains her how his face changed. The children also escaped from the Snake World but Saddam brings the news to Simsim about the Talisman and tortures the children.

On returning home happily, Ali and Marjina gets to know from Hasan, (who was stabbed by Simsim and left alive to give the information to Ali), that the children are kidnapped by Simsim in the palace of Kabul Shahi. Ali and Marjina rush to Kabul Shahi to save the children and where Ali realises that Marjina is actually Princess Mariam. Then they successfully saved the children and Mariam finally kills Saddam. Simsim goes to find the Talisman but fails and gets to know that she needs Ali's helps to get the Talisman as she saw the Noor of Shangrila on Ali 's back when she was fighting against him. She asks for Ali's help but he refuses. Then she kills Noora Dadi and threatens Ali that she will kill every one Ali has loved and will destroy the entire Parvaz. So, for the sake of everyone's life, Ali Baba promises to get the Talisman for her.

Then they reach the Shangrila in the north of Hindustan to get the Talisman where Ali gets injured while saving Roshni from an arrow. Then Roshni takes them inside the Shangrila. There, Ali Baba takes the Talisman and Roshni is apparently killed by Simsim, but Ali blames himself for her death. On returning to Parvaz, Ali seemingly gives the Talisman to SImsim. Mariam reveals to Ali that Roshni is his mother. Ali is mortified and swears revenge, revealing he has the real Talisman. Then Ali goes to the cave of Simsim and when he was about to open the door of Simsim's Cave, he was confronted by the guru of Shangrila Tribe and he says that Roshni has not been killed but vanished and kidnapped by Simsim. He then finds the prison which had Roshni and Ali frees her and they both go to Parvaaz. They then were having a feast on the birthday of Ali's father Mustafa. On the same day Simsim and the Forty Thieves comes to Parvaaz to recover the Talisman from Ali.

Mariam sets fire to the boxes that held captive the Forty Thieves. Simsim pretends to have burned as well. Using this trick, she steals the Talisman from Ali and starts the ceremony to awaken Iblis. Ali stops her, and burns Iblis's body to ashes. Simsim swears revenge and decides to use the Talisman for her vengeance.

However, she finds a suitable body and Iblis returns to life. Simsim and Iblis goes to Parvaz. To save Ali, Roshni pushes him to a magical world and there he is hung upside down and sees his long lost brother, Hatim.

Hatim and Ali Baba initially gets into rivalry but still they have to fight together as Iblis has been reborn and is destroying the world to find Ali as he has the "Roshan Dil" and it is in destiny of Ali Baba to kill Iblis and finish the darkness but Ali can't defeat Iblis because he is too weak against Iblis. On Behrouz Baba's insist, Tahira convinces Hatim to train Ali because Hatim has experience and Ali has power. Iblis finds Ali and kills Behrouz Baba but Ali Baba, Tahira and Hatim escaped to find the seven most difficult questions of the universe to train Ali and to get the magical stone to defeat Iblis.

However, one of the fourteen devils tries to capture Ali, but fails the first time and Ali, Hatim and Tahira found the first question's answer but the devil succeeds in capturing Ali the second time and he takes Ali to Kabul. On reaching, Ali captured the devil by using Hatim's inventory pocket. Now, Ali and Hatim have divided their works as Hatim would find the answers of the questions and Ali will capture all the other devils of Iblis. The Black Genie wants to marry Simsim and Iblis agrees. Iblis tells Mariam that Ali is dead and that she will be his wife. Mariam refuses. Simsim gets extremely happy thinking that she is going to marry Iblis.

On the wedding day, Ali and Marjina meets. Simsim gets to know about Iblis' real intention and Simsim protests against him and Iblis takes her power and abandoned her. Now, Ali Baba and Simsim unites together to kill Iblis. Simsim and Ali enters Iblis' palace and they convinced him to trust them.

Ali captured all the fourteen devils of Iblis' with the help of Simsim, by which Iblis gets weaker than before. On the other hand, Iblis gets the magical stone after capturing Hatim in the world of most difficult questions and after his return, Iblis captures Ali and his team and he reveals his real plans to Simsim. Simsim got to know that Iblis has to sacrifice his wife and all of his devils so he had to marry princess Mariam and to capture all his devils. Iblis gives Simsim her powers back. Simsim takes Roshni's powers and disguises herself as Roshni and tries to send Ali to Iblis so that Iblis can use the Roshan Dil but Ali recognised her. Ali helps Hatim to release himself while Hatim gives an idea to Ali to defeat Iblis. Ali goes after Iblis with a plan. Hatim goes to find the Talisman. Ali with the help of Hatim defeated Iblis by the use of Talisman. But Simsim escapes and wanted to become the supreme darkness and burns Ibils' body so that he can never return. Simsim divides her soul into four halves in air, water, land and lava. Roshni, Marjina, Hatim and Ali respectively goes and finally found the halves of Simsim 's soul. After uniting the soul, Ali Baba finally defeated Simsim as well. The series ends with Ali Baba, Marjina and his family living happily ever after.

== Cast ==
=== Main ===
- Sheezan Khan as Ali Baba:
  - Mustafa and Roshni's son, Qasim's younger half brother, Iblis's nephew, Hatim foster brother, caretaker of five orphan children, Mariam's love-interest. (2022)
    - Abhishek Nigam replaced Shezan Khan as Ali Baba. (2023)
    - Subhan Khan as young Ali Baba (2022)
- Tunisha Sharma as Mariam:
  - Princess of Kabul, Ali's love-interest, Sultan Shah Zuhaid's daughter. She is known as Marjina (fake identity) by Ali, his five orphan children and his friends. (2022)
    - Manul Chudasama replaced Tunisha Sharma as Shehzaadi Mariam. (2023)
- Karthik Jayaram as Iblis:
  - Leader of 40 thieves, Simsim's love interest Roshni's brother, a dreadful and deadly warrior. (2022-2023)
    - Aarav Chowdhary replaced Karthik as Iblis (2023)
- Sayantani Ghosh as Simsim/Simi Jaan:
  - Devotee of Iblis. Later blessed with power and cursed to become guardian of the cave. Iblis love interest. (2022–2023)

=== Recurring ===
- Arisht Jain as Imaad Abdali, An intelligent so-called orphan raised by Ali. He is later revealed to be Ziya Abdali's biological second son and Zoravar's younger half-brother whom he abandoned in Ali's house years ago. (2022)
- Sara Paintal as Gulrez, A youngest of all the orphans raised by Ali. (2022)
- Ekagra Dwivedi as Poya, A foodie orphan raised by Ali. (2022-2023)
- Jared Savaille as Nafi Afghani, A chilled and open-minded so-called orphan raised by Ali. He is later revealed to be the son of Theeyab Afghani who is the Chief of Nakabjani Tribe and is raised by the family of thieves. This truth is only known to Poya who is another orphan kid being raised by Ali. He is the first person to know about Marjina's real identity. (2022-2023)
- Ananya Dwivedi as Alifi, A kind and eldest of all the orphans raised by Ali. (2022-2023)
- Naved Aslam as Mustafa, Qasim and Ali Baba's father and a great sorcerer who was killed by Iblis. (2022-2023)
- Daljeet Soundh as Noora Bibi, Mustafa's mother, Qasim and Ali Baba's paternal grandmother who locked herself in her room for 20 years and came out of the room when the moon broke. (2022-2023)
- Vineet Raina as Qasim, Mustafa's son from first wife and Ali's elder half-brother. He was killed by Simsim and the forty thieves. (2022)
- Sapna Thakur as Nazia, Qasim's widow, Ali's half-sister-in-law (2022-2023)
- Ayush Shrivastava as Khusro/Kishore, Ali's best friend who hails from Hindustan. (2022-2023)
- Hunza Sabir as Zarifa, Dariba's sister, Ali's friend (2022-2023)
- Parth Zutshi Sarin as Dariba, Zarifa's brother, Ali's friend (2022-2023)
- Akshay Anand as Sultan Shah Zuhaid, Kind Emperor of Kabul and Mariam's father who was assassinated by his own brother-in-law, Saddam. (2022)
- Farida Dadi as Zoya, Mariam's caretaker who was killed by Majhud. (2022)
- Mukul Nag as Dara Gazi Princess Mariam protector (2022)
- Karan Pahwa as Jahangir (2022)
- Kaushik Chakravorty as Monk (2022)
- Chandan Anand as Saddam, Mariam's wicked maternal uncle who became the Emperor of Kabul with Simsim's help. he was killed by Princess Mariam (2022, 2023)
- Soneer Vadhera as Majhud, A general of Kabul's army and Saddam's sidekick, killed by Dara Gazi, Yajhud's twin brother, sidekick and new Commander-in-chief of Kabul under Saddam's rule. (2022)
- Mohit Abrol as Zoravar Abdali, Shahi Sarrak's chief Zia Abdali's son, Imaad's elder half-brother, Ali Baba's rival. He was killed by the snake monster named Fakri sent by the Simsim and the 40 thieves. (2022)
- Zahid Ali as Ziya Abdali, Shahi Sarrak's chief, Zoravar and Imaad's father. (2022–2023)
- Khushbu Tiwari as Fatima, Afrasia's daughter, Ali Baba's love-interest. (2022)
- Navina Bole as Afrasiya, Fatima's mother. (2022)
- Ravi Gossain as Usmaan, A low ranked general in Kabul's army whom Ali tricked by disguising as Iblis. (2022-2023)
- Rajdeep Singh Kharoud as Haider (2022)
- Athar Siddiqui as Dajjal, He was killed by Ali . (2022)
- Gaurav Walia as Ifrit, second-in-command of forty thieves and the most powerful thief after Iblis. (2022-2023)
- Raviz Thakur as Khafees, one of the forty thieves and Iblis' one of the favourites. (2022-2023)
- Kailash Topnani as Ghoul, one of the forty thieves and Iblis' one of the favourites. (2022-2023)
- Ritvik Bhargava as Aazim (2022)
- Rumi Khan as Aamir Rehmani (2022)
- Behzaad Khan as Behzaak, who capture for slavery. (2022)
- Anshul Bammi as Shahmed, Prince of Herat and Saddam's sidekick. (2022)
- Sumedh Mudgalkar as Hatim, Roshni's adoptive son, Ali's foster brother, Iblis' nephew; Tahira's best-friend; Behrouz Baba's student (2023)
- Srishti Jain as Tahira: Hatim's best-friend; a warrior; Behrouz Baba's daughter (2023)
- Mahi Bhadra as Afifa/ Haida. (2023)
- Saanvie Tallwar as Humaira (2023)
- Vineet Bhonde as Hasan/ Bade Kotwal. (2023)
- Aradhana Sharma as Rumana (2023)
- Ram Yashvardhan as Shehzada of Ras Al Khaimah (2023)
- Alisha Tunga as Rukhsar, Marjina's friend from Ras Al Khaimah (2023)
- Vaibhavi Mahajan as Gul, Marjina's friend who was killed by the Shehzada (Haiwan) of Ras Al Khaimah (2023)
- Jasveer Kaur as Roshni: Ali and Hatim's mother; Mustafa's second wife; Qasim's step–mother; Iblis's sister (2023)
- Ajay Raju as disciple of Guruji (2023) (Shangrila Village)
- Hemant Choudhary as Behroz Baba: Tahira's father; Hatim's teacher (2023)

== Production ==
=== Casting ===
Sheezan Khan was cast in the titular role, and was joined by Tunisha Sharma, Karthik Jayaram and Sayantani Ghosh as leads.

Navina Bole was cast to portray Fatima's mother in October 2022.

Abhishek Nigam replaced Sheezan Khan in Season 2 in January 2023 post Sharma's demise while Manul Chudasama replaced Tunisha as Mariam in the following month. In May 2023, Sumedh Mudgalkar and Srishti Jain entered the show as Hatim and Tahira respectively.

=== Controversy ===
On 24 December 2022, actress Tunisha Sharma playing the lead role of Shehzaadi Mariam, committed suicide by hanging herself in the green room of co-star Sheezan Khan on set. She was taken to a nearby hospital where she was declared dead on arrival.

Hours after her death her co-actor, rumored boyfriend and the lead Sheezan Khan was booked in the case of abetment for suicide by her mother.

On 4 January 2023, Federation of Western India Cine Employees, president BN Tiwari demanded strict action against the makers for negligence.

=== Development ===
The series was announced by Peninsula Pictures in March 2022 and was confirmed in July 2022 by Sony SAB. The shooting of the series began in June 2022 in Ladakh, India.

=== Filming ===
The shooting of the series halted after the lead actress Tunisha Sharma committed suicide on set in Naigaon. The show had an episode bank of one week.

The cast resumed the shooting of the series on 4 January 2023, on Renu Studio in Naigaon. Actor Abhishek Nigam was finalized to replace Sheezan Khan as Ali Baba in a new plot.

== Soundtrack ==
Ali Baba

Soundtrack album by Souvyk Chakraborty
- Released: 2022
- Genres: Romance; Soundtrack
- Length: 3:14
- Language: Hindi
- Label: SonyLIV
- Producers: Nissar Parvez; Alind Srivastava

Ali Baba soundtrack is composed by Souvyk Chakraborty. The first song "Rehnuma" is the theme song of Ali and Mariam.

Tracklisting
No.	Title	Singer(s)	Length
1.	"Rehnuma" (Duet)		2:00
2.	"Uran Chu" (Male)	Aabhik Ghosh	1:14
Total length:			3:14

== See also ==
- List of programmes broadcast by Sony SAB
