= Sanskaar Laxmi =

- संस्कार लक्ष्मी
- Genre: Drama
- Created by: R M Joshi
- Written by: Mitesh Shah, Swati Shah, Vikas Tiwari, Gitangshu Dey, Anand Goradiya, Swati Goradiya, & Vinod Sharma
- Directed by: Fahad Kashmiri; Roy V.George
- Starring: Veebha Anand; Shakti Arora; Vivan Bhatena; Suzanne Bernert; Vikas Sethi; Aamir Dalvi; Anisha Kapoor Ahmad Harhash
- Opening theme: "Sanskaar Laxmi"
- Country of origin: India
- Original language: Hindi
- No. of seasons: 1
- No. of episodes: 137

Production
- Producers: R M Joshi & Rajesh Pavithran
- Cinematography: Balu Dahifale
- Editor: Santosh Singh
- Camera setup: Multi-camera
- Running time: Approx. 24 minutes
- Production company: Spin-A-Tale Entertainment

Original release
- Network: Zee TV
- Release: 17 January – 8 September 2011

Sanskaar Laxmi is an Indian television drama series which premiered on Zee TV on 17 January 2011 to 8 September 2011. The series is based on the life of a poor village girl, Laxmi who gets married into a rich Gujarati family in Mumbai. The story shows how a less educated but worldly wise, mature and extremely talented Laxmi overcomes obstacles to settle down in her life.

== Plot ==
Laxmi is rooted in Indian traditions and has an inborn knack for winning peoples hearts with her pleasant demeanor and sweet smile even in adverse situations. For Laxmi, 'Sanskaar' does not mean only following rituals blindly but it means caring for everyone and valuing relationships.

Laxmi enters a rich but fragmenting joint urban Purohit family based in Mumbai as their daughter-in-law and plays the central role in stopping the family from falling apart. How the Purohit family, a traditional believer in rituals and culture of Hindu religion deals with the rural, modern and ultramodern lifestyle after bringing in their daughters-in-law; how significant a role Laxmi plays after coming in and how she overcomes her own as well as her family's trials and tribulations forms the basis of the show.

== Cast ==
- Veebha Anand as Laxmi Angad Purohit (Angad's wife)
- Shakti Arora as Angad Purohit-Vijay and Shobhna's son
- Vivan Bhatena as Parag Purohit
- Rohit Purohit as Suraj Purohit
- Suzanne Bernert as Jennifer
- Vikas Sethi as Mandar
- Aamir Dalvi as Mahen Purohit
- Anisha Kapoor as Ragini
- Rajesh Shringarpure as Harsukh Purohit
- Anang Desai as Jagmohan Purohit-Vijay's father and Angad's grandfather
- Dharmesh Vyas as Vijay Purohit
- Falguni Parekh as Mrs. Purohit
- Prateeksha Lonkar as Kaveri Purohit
- Shafaq Naaz as Randhal
- David Moss as White boy 1
- Emmanuel Latham as Pilot 1
- Jonathon Faulkner as Pilot 2 / Check in assistant
- Ahmad Harhash as Raj Singh Rathore Check in assistant
