= Vaishnavi Ganatra =

Indian Actress

Vaishnavi Ganatra is an Indian actress. She has appeared on TV shows like Hamari Wali Good News, Rakshabandhan... Rasal Apne Bhai Ki Dhal, Woh Toh Hai Albelaa, Mauka-E-Vardaat, Naagin 6 and Teri Meri Doriyaann

== Filmography ==
=== Film ===
Key
†	Denotes films that have not yet been released

Year	Film	Role	Language	Ott(s)
2022	The Ghost	Hrithi	Telugu	Netflix
2025	Aachari Baa	Bilva	Hindi	JioHotstar

=== Television ===
Year	Show	Role	Channel	Ref.
2020	Hamari Wali Good News	Aanchal Mishra	Zee TV	
2021	Mauka-E-Vardaat	Meenu Verma	&TV	
2021	Rakshabandhan... Rasal Apne Bhai Ki Dhal	Kanak Shivraj Singh	Dangal	
2022	Woh Toh Hai Albelaa	Priya Sharma	Star Bharat	
2023	Teri Meri Doriyaann	Ekam Kaur Brar	Star Plus	
2023	Naagin 6	Tina Ahlawat	Colors TV	
2025–present	Jagadhatri	Aarna Deshmukh	Zee TV	

=== Web series ===
Year	Title	Role	Language	Ref(s)
2020	Abhay 2	Young Sonam	Hindi	
2024	Heeramandi	Young Waheeda	Hindi	
