= Vishal Aditya Singh =

Indian television actor (born 1988)

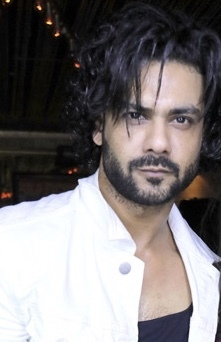
- Singh in 2019
- Born: 25 January 1988 (age 38); Arrah, Bihar, India
- Occupation: Actor
- Years active: 2010–present
- Known for: Begusarai; Chandrakanta; Nach Baliye 9; Bigg Boss 13; Fear Factor: Khatron Ke Khiladi 11; Chand Jalne Laga
- Height: 6 ft 4 in (193 cm)

Vishal Aditya Singh (born 25 January 1988), is an Indian actor who works in Hindi television. He is best known for his roles in Begusarai and Chandrakanta. He is also known for his participation in the reality shows, Nach Baliye 9, Bigg Boss 13, Khatron Ke Khiladi 11 and Khatron Ke Khiladi 15.

== Early life ==
Singh excelled in cricket at school and state tournaments. He began his career as a model, and came to Mumbai after some modelling assignments, to pursue his acting career.

== Career ==
=== Debut and early struggles (2010–2015) ===
Singh made his debut in 2010 as the main lead Avdesh Thakur in Sagar Films production Jai Jai Shiv Shankar, a Bhojpuri serial on Mahuaa TV. His first Hindi TV role was in the historical drama Chandragupta Maurya in 2011 wherein he appeared as Shashank. From 2012 to 2013, Singh enacted the part of Veeru in Rashmi Sharma's popular series Sasural Simar Ka on Colors TV. In 2014, he played a cop in the comedy Bachchan Pandey ki Toli on Dhamaal TV. In 2015, he essayed Devendra Singh Rana in mini series Time Machine on Epic TV.

=== Breakthrough and success (2015–2018) ===
Singh achieved a turning point in his career when he was cast to play the dual roles of father and son Lakhan Thakur and Shakti Thakur in the &TV show Begusarai, opposite Shivangi Joshi and Veebha Anand. He did an episodic in 2016 for Zing's Pyaar Tune Kya Kiya. In June 2017, Singh appeared in the lead role of King Veerendra Pratap Singh in Ekta Kapoor's fantasy TV series Chandrakanta broadcast on Colors TV. Later in 2018, he was seen in Gul Khan's musical show Kullfi Kumarr Bajewala on StarPlus as singer Tevar Singh.

=== Reality shows and further work (2019–present) ===
In July 2019, Singh joined as a celebrity contestant in the dance based reality show Nach Baliye 9 with Madhurima Tuli where the duo emerged as the 2nd runner-up couple. Just after the finale of Nach, he entered as a wild card contestant in popular controversial reality show Bigg Boss 13 where he was evicted on Day 127 ending up at 8th place. In 2020, Singh also featured in two music videos— Dil Mein Hindustan (related to Independence Day) and Khwabeeda (along with Madhurima Tuli). In May 2021, he headed to Cape Town for participating in the stunt based adventure series Fear Factor: Khatron Ke Khiladi 11 where he emerged as 2nd runner-up contestant. From October 2023 to February 2024, he returned to acting with his portrayal of Dev Malik opposite Kanika Mann in Colors TV's Chand Jalne Laga.

== Personal life ==
Singh met actress Madhurima Tuli on the set of Chandrakanta in 2017 and later dated her. They broke up after a year of dating in 2018.

== Media ==
Singh was ranked in The Times of India's Most Desirable Men on Television list at No. 13 in 2018, at No. 17 in 2019, and at No. 18 in 2020.

== Filmography ==
=== Television ===
| Year | Title | Role | Notes | Ref. |
|---|---|---|---|---|
| 2011 | Chandragupta Maurya | Shashank | Recurring Role | |
| 2012–2013 | Sasural Simar Ka | Veeru | Recurring Role | |
| 2015–2016 | Begusarai | Lakhan Thakur | | |
| 2017–2018 | Chandrakanta | King Veerendra "Veer" Pratap Singh | | |
| 2018 | Kullfi Kumarr Bajewala | Tevar Singh | | |
| 2019 | Nach Baliye 9 | Contestant | 2nd runner-up | |
| 2019–2020 | Bigg Boss 13 | Contestant | 8th place | |
| 2021 | Fear Factor: Khatron Ke Khiladi 11 | Contestant | 2nd runner-up | |
| 2022–2023 | Parshuram | Lord Parashurama | | |
| 2023–2024 | Chand Jalne Laga | Dev "Deva" Malik | | |
| 2025 | Sampoorna | Inspector Satyendra "Sattu" Lohar | | |
| 2026 | Khatron Ke Khiladi 15 | Contestant | 11th place | |

==== Special appearances ====
| Year | Title | Role | Ref. |
|---|---|---|---|
| 2015 | Killerr Karaoke Atka Toh Latkah | Lakhan Thakur/Shakti Thakur | |
| 2016 | Pyar Tune Kya Kiya | Rashid | |
| 2016 | Box Cricket League 2 | Contestant | |
| 2018 | Box Cricket League 3 | Contestant | |
| 2019 | Box Cricket League 4 | Contestant | |
| 2021 | Dance Deewane 3 | Himself | |
| 2021 | Ladies vs Gentlemen 2 | Panelist | |
| 2022 | Khatra Khatra Khatra | Himself | |
| 2022 | Hunarbaaz: Desh Ki Shaan | Himself | |
| 2023 | Entertainment Ki Raat Housefull | Himself | |
| 2023 | Bigg Boss 17 | Dev "Deva" Malik | |

=== Music video appearances ===
| Year | Title | Singer(s) | Ref. |
|---|---|---|---|
| 2020 | "Dil Mein Hindustan" | Arun Dev Yadav, Anisha Saikia, Avanie Joshi | |
| 2020 | "Khwabeeda" | Anurag Mohn | |
| 2022 | "Dildaar" | Manoj Tiwari, Vishal Mishra | |
| 2022 | "Dil Toota Hi Raha" | Mohammed Irfan | |
| 2022 | "Chhath Ke Baratiya" | Sharda Sinha | |
| 2022 | "Ye Mere Armaan" | Vijay Vatsal | |
| 2023 | "Duwayen" | Mohd Danish | |
| 2023 | "Ye Batao" | Arun Singh | |
| 2023 | "Tu Dua Hai Meri" | Vyom Singh Rajput | |
| 2025 | "Jogira sa ra ra" | Akshara Singh, Sugam Singh | |
| 2025 | "Farzi" | KavyaKriti, Yashraj Kapil | |
