= Ek Thi Rani Ek Tha Raavan =

Indian drama television series (2019-2019)

- Genre: Drama
- Directed by: Faheim Inamdar Sayed
- Starring: Ram Yashvardhan; Manul Chudasama; Sheezan Khan
- Opening theme: Ek Thi Rani Ek Tha Ravan
- Composer: Ila Arun
- Country of origin: India
- Original language: Hindi
- No. of seasons: 1
- No. of episodes: 208

Production
- Producer: Suzana Ghai
- Running time: 20-24 minutes
- Production company: Panorama Entertainment Pvt Ltd

Original release
- Network: Star Bharat
- Release: 21 January – 21 September 2019

Ek Thi Rani Ek Tha Raavan (transl. Once there was a Queen and a Villain) is an Indian Hindi-language drama television series that premiered from 21 January 2019 to 21 September 2019 on Star Bharat and is digitally available on Disney+ Hotstar. An adaptation of Darr, it starred Ram Yashvardhan, Manul Chudasama and Sheezan Khan.

== Plot ==
The story revolves around Rani and her stalker Rivaaj. Rivaaj saw Rani at the college and instantly fell for her courageous nature. Ever since Rivaaj keeping Stalking Rani. Rivaaj propose Rani which she rejects. Out of frustration Rivaaj decided to marry Rani's sister Rukmini. Rivaaj plans to switch brides during the wedding to marry Rani. However his plan backfires and Rani marries Rivaaj mentally delayed brother Raghav.

Rivaaj tries everything he can to obtain Rani. When all his attempts backfired, Rivaaj burned Raghav and Rani Alive. Raghav died and Rani survived. Rani underwent plastic surgery and comes back under the name Mayura. Ruvaaj has become a successful actor. Mayura becomes Rivaaj's person bodyguard. Eventually after a lot of efforts Mayura burned Rivaaj in the same warehouse he burned Rani and Raghav.

== Cast ==
- Ram Yashvardhan as Rivaaj/Ram
- Manul Chudasama as Rani
  - Srishti Jain as Rani/Mayura
- Sheezan Khan as Raghav
- Natasha Singh as Kesha
- Sara Khan as Dancer (Ringa ringa)
- Devaksh Rai as Journalist
- Karrtik Rao as Kartik

== Production ==
The series was announced in 2019 by Star Bharat, an official television adaptation of the 1993 Hindi film Darr. The promos were released in December 2018. Ram Yashvardhan was cast in the titular role, and was joined by Manul Chudasama and Sheezan Khan as leads. Due to creative differences Manul Chudasama was replaced overnight with Srishti Jain. Natasha Singh was cast to portray the negative lead. Mahek Chahal had a cameo appearance in the show, but later replaced with Sara Khan. It premeried on Star Bharat from 21 January 2019 and went off-air within 9 months on 21 September 2019, due to low viewership.

== See also ==
- List of programs broadcast by Star Bharat
