= Falaq Naaz =

Indian television actress

- Born: Falaq Khan; 2 December 1991 (age 34); Meerut, Uttar Pradesh, India
- Occupations: Actor; model
- Years active: 2010–present
- Known for: Sasural Simar Ka; Bigg Boss OTT 2
- Relatives: Shafaq Naaz (sister); Sheezan Khan (brother)

Falaq Naaz (born 2 December 1991) is an Indian actress who predominantly works in Hindi television. Falaq is best known for her role, Jhanvi Bhardwaj in Sasural Simar Ka. She is also known for her participation in Bigg Boss OTT 2 as a contestant in which she was evicted at 10th place.

In 2025 Falaq became the team owner of team Shuttle Snipers in Indian Pro Badminton League .

Falaq is also known for her roles in Mahakali — Anth Hi Aarambh Hai, Roop - Mard Ka Naya Swaroop, Vish Ya Amrit: Sitara, Ram Siya Ke Luv Kush and Pandya Store.

== Early life ==
Falaq was born on 2 December 1991 in Meerut and brought up in Mumbai. She is the elder sister of actors Shafaq Naaz and Sheezan Khan.

== Personal life ==
In 2023, Falaq revealed that she has a close bond with rumoured boyfriend actor Avinash Sachdev but did not confirm being romantically involved with him.

== Filmography ==
=== Films ===
Year	Title	Role	Ref.
2024	Chote Nawab	Nafeesa	

=== Television ===
Year	Title	Role	Ref.
2010–2011	Gunahon Ka Devta	Shikha Singh Thakur	
2011–2012	Dekha Ek Khwaab	Tara	
2012–2013	Mujhse Kuchh Kehti...Yeh Khamoshiyaan	Archana	
2013	Adaalat	Rubia/Maya	
2013–2017	Sasural Simar Ka	Jhanvi Bharadwaj Malhotra	
2013	Taarak Mehta Ka Ooltah Chashmah	Mukti Maa's sidekick	
2014	Savdhaan India	Rehana Hussain	
2014	Savdhaan India	Naina	
2014–2015	Bharat Ka Veer Putra – Maharana Pratap	Ruqaiya Sultan	
2015	Doli Armaano Ki	Pooja Sinha	
2017	Shankar Jaikishan 3 in 1	Dr. Twinkle Kapoor	
2018	Box Cricket League	Contestant	
2018	Roop – Mard Ka Naya Swaroop	Minal	
2018	Laal Ishq	Kamini	
2018–2022	RadhaKrishn	Devaki	
2018–2019	Vish Ya Amrit: Sitara	Chhabili	
2019–2020	Ram Siya Ke Luv Kush	Mandodari	
2020–2021	Shaurya Aur Anokhi Ki Kahani	Babli Bhalla Bhatia	
2021	Jai Kanhaiya Lal Ki	Devaki	
2023	Bigg Boss OTT 2	Contestant	
2024	Pandya Store	Hetal Makwana	
2024	Jubilee Talkies – Shohrat Shiddat Mohabbat	Dimple Goldie Chopra	
2024-2025	Megha Barsenge	Mandeep "Mandy" Talwar	
2026	Pati Anaadi	Manjari	

== See also ==
- List of Hindi television actresses
- List of Indian television actresses
