= Chand Jalne Laga =

Indian drama television series

- Genre: Thriller; Drama; Romance
- Created by: Siddharth Kumar Tewary
- Starring: Vishal Aditya Singh; Kanika Mann
- Country of origin: India
- Original language: Hindi
- No. of seasons: 1
- No. of episodes: 82

Production
- Producers: Siddharth Kumar Tewary; Gayatri Gil Tewary
- Camera setup: Multi camera
- Running time: 20-22 minutes
- Production company: Swastik Pictures

Original release
- Network: Colors TV
- Release: 23 October 2023 – 4 February 2024

Chand Jalne Laga (transl. Moon Has Started Burning) is an Indian Hindi-language drama television series that aired from 23 October 2023 to 4 February 2024 on Colors TV. It is also available to stream on Jio Cinema. Produced by Siddharth Kumar Tewary and Gayatri Gill under Swastik Pictures, it starred Vishal Aditya Singh and Kanika Mann.

== Plot ==
Tara and Deva are childhood friends. Tara is the daughter of Vanraj Sehgal who is rich and Deva is an orphan and a farrier who takes care of horses in Tara's house. Deva teaches Tara how to be strong and face her fear because of which they grow close to each other. Deva considers Tara as his family along with a horse named Badshah as he has no family of his own. One day, a fire breaks out in Sehgal Mansion, and Deva is blamed for the fire incident. Tara despite knowing Deva was with her when the fire broke out, lies as her father instructs her to lie to save Deva from the villagers. Deva is sent to a juvenile home. Tara hears the news that Deva is dead due to a building collapse. She believes that Deva is dead.

Deva comes back into Tara's life as Mr Dev Malik, a businessman to get his revenge against her

Deva slowly starts to have soft feelings for Tara and saves her from the Diwali accident but suddenly, Dr. Arjun, Tara's childhood friend comes back and Deva misunderstands Tara again and resumes his revenge mode. Tara comes to know about Mr. Malik being Deva after seeing a pair of anklets in his car which she used to wear in childhood. Vanraj and his family force Tara to marry Arjun and she agrees. Deva fumes and kidnaps Raunak to blackmail Tara, he challenges her to cancel the engagement and to marry him, to save Raunak. Tara agrees to marry him. They complete four pheras but Arjun and Raunak reach there and hit Deva and try to kill him. Tara saves him and completes their marriage with all rituals. Deva vows to snatch her happiness and Tara vows to bring her old Deva back.

Tara's family breaks all relations with Tara. Tara enters Deva's house with the help of Farwari. After fulfilling all rituals, Tara gets a clue of Deva's birth. She investigates Sanmukhi and Savitri and comes to know about Jyoti, Deva's birth mother. She somehow manages to take Deva to the temple where Deva meets Jyoti. Some people recognize Jyoti and throw stones at her for giving birth to an illegitimate child, but Deva saves her. They bring Jyothi home and there Jyothi's family comes to take her back. After Tara threatened Savitri ( Nani) to tell the truth to Deva. Nani tells Deva the truth in a harsh way and takes Jyothi away from Haveli. Deva then has an accident and needs blood and Tara manages to reach Jyothi to save Deva. She gives him the blood and he gets saved.

Then Tara brings them to the haveli and Nani agrees because some money lenders are on their necks for money they took as a loan. Jyothi's present husband reaches there and insults Deva for being an orphan and having no surname. Tara agrees to leave Deva in return Nani promises to give Deva their surname.

Tara leaves him after a misunderstanding that Deva doesn't want her in her life. Then she gets a hint that Nani and Prakash are behind Deva's money. She comes back as Chand and tries many ways to save Deva" s money and Deva makes Nani furious.

Nani kidnaps Jyothi with the help of a money lender but Deva and Tara save her. Rekha ( mami) has a niece who is a widow and also lives with them. Madan (mama) has a bad eye for Jyothi. To save herself from Madam she mistakenly enters in a temple where widows are not allowed. To save her Deva fills her sindoor on her forehead but hides their marriage from Tara. Someone blackmails them on the phone. Tara comes to know the truth and she is heartbroken. But Deva and Tara come to know that Preeti and Prakash are together. They expose them and get married with the blessings of the family. The show ends on a happy note.

== Cast ==
=== Main ===
- Kanika Mann as Tara Sehgal Malik: Vanraj and Amrita's younger daughter; Raunak's sister; Ananya's cousin sister; Arjun's ex-fiancee; Deva's childhood friend turned wife (2023–2024)
  - Urvi Upadhyay as child Tara (2023)
- Vishal Aditya Singh as Dev Malik aka Deva: Jyoti's illegitimate son; Prakash's step son; Farwari's foster brother; Tara's childhood friend turned husband (2023–2024)
  - Krish Chugh as child Deva (2023)

=== Recurring ===
- Nasirr Khan as Vanraj Sehgal: Sartaj's brother; Amrita's widower; Raunak and Tara's father; Ananya's uncle (2023–2024)
- Sorab Bedi as Raunak Sehgal: Vanraj and Amrita's elder son; Tara's brother; Ananya's cousin brother (2023–2024)
- Praneet Bhat as Sartaj Sehgal: Vanraj's brother; Soni's husband; Ananya's father; Paternal uncle of Raunak and Tara (2023–2024)
- Trishna Mukherjee as Soni Sehgal: Sartaj's wife; Ananya's mother; Raunak and Tara's aunt (2023–2024)
- Shefali Mahida as Ananya Sehgal: Sartaj and Soni's daughter; Raunak and Tara's cousin sister; Palash's ex-fiancée (2023–2024)
- Somesh Agarwal as Vasant: Caretaker of Sehgal Haveli (2023–2024)
- Sheezan Khan as Dr. Arjun Singh Thakur: Tara's childhood friend and ex-fiancé; Amrit's son (2023)
- Krishna Gokani as Amrit: Arjun's mother (2023)
- Prerna Singh Khawas as Farwari: Deva's foster sister (2023–2024)
- Meena Nathani as Savitri: Deva's maternal grandmother (2023–2024)
- Neetu Pandey as Jyoti: Deva's mother; Prakash's wife (2023–2024)
- Gurpreet Singh as Prakash: Jyoti's husband; Deva's step father (2024)
- Srishti Jain as Priti: Tara's widowed friend (2024)
- Ivanka Das as Shanmukhi: Savitri's right-hand woman (2023)
- Shubhi Sharma as Chanda (2023)
- Karrtik Rao as Palash: Ananya's ex-fiancé (2023)
- Akshat Karma as Rajveer: Palash's friend (2023)
- Aditya Singh Bundela as Palash's friend (2023)
- Sangeeta Adhikari as Palash's mother (2023)
- Satyamvada Singh as Shagun Dharamse: Tara's boss (2023)

=== Cameo appearances ===
- Mamta Verma as Amrita Sehgal: Vanraj's wife; Raunak and Tara's mother (2023)

== Production ==
=== Development ===
The series title is inspired by the song Suraj Hua Maddham, from the 2001 Bollywood movie, Kabhi Khushi Kabhie Gham. The series was announced by Swastik Pictures for Colors TV.

=== Casting ===
Vishal Aditya Singh and Kanika Mann were cast to play the leads as Dev and Tara. In early December 2023, Sheezan Khan was cast as Dr. Arjun Thakur but he quitted in same month. In early January 2024, Srishti Jain was cast to play the role of Tara's widowed friend Priti.

=== Filming ===
The principal photography of the series commenced from September 2023 at the Film City, Mumbai. The cast also promoted the series on Bigg Boss 17.

== Soundtrack ==
The title track has been sung by Amit Mishra and Antara Mitra. The music is composed by Raja Narayan Deb and lyrics by Manoj Yadav.

Chand Jalne Laga

Soundtrack album by Amit Mishra Antara Mitra
- Released: 2023
- Genre: Soundtrack
- Length: 1:30
- Language: Hindi
- Label: Colors TV

Music video
- "Chand Jalne Laga" on YouTube

Tracklisting
No.	Title	Singer(s)	Length
1.	"Chand Jalne Laga" (Duet)	Amit Mishra and Antara Mitra	1:30
Total length:			1:30

== Reception ==
India Today noted, "Besides Kanika and Vishal’s intense acting, what truly breathes life into the sentiments of love, separation, and uncertainty in their relationship is the music. The show appears to heavily rely on clichéd melodrama and stereotypical elements commonly found in Indian television."

== See also ==
- List of programmes broadcast by Colors TV
