= Chandrakanta (2017 TV series) =

Indian television series

- Also known as: Chandrakanta — Ek Mayavi Prem Gaatha
- Created by: Ekta Kapoor
- Based on: Chandrakanta by Devaki Nandan Khatri
- Directed by: Ranjan Kumar Singh
- Starring: See below
- Composer: Altamash Faridi
- Country of origin: India
- Original language: Hindi
- No. of seasons: 1
- No. of episodes: 94

Production
- Producers: Ekta Kapoor; Shobha Kapoor
- Camera setup: Multi-camera
- Running time: 41 minutes
- Production company: Balaji Telefilms

Original release
- Network: Colors TV
- Release: 24 June 2017 – 16 June 2018

Chandrakanta — Ek Mayavi Prem Gaatha (transl. Moonlight - An Elusive Love Story) is an Indian supernatural fantasy television series which premiered on Colors TV on 24 June 2017 and ended on 16 June 2018. Based on the 1888 novel of the same name by Devaki Nandan Khatri, it tells the story of Princess Chandrakanta. The show is produced by Ekta Kapoor and directed by Ranjan Kumar Singh under the Balaji Telefilms banner.

== Plot ==
Princess Chandrakanta Jai Singh is born to Ratnaprabha, a great magician who has the most powerful dagger of Lord Vishnu. Iravati Singh, an evil queen, wants the dagger to rule the world and conquers Vijaygarh. Ratnaprabha hides the dagger at a temple to protect it so that it could be passed on to Chandrakanta after 21 years.

=== 21 years later ===
Iravati still searches for the dagger. Her stepson Veer plans to conquer Suryagarh kingdom. Chandrakanta, raised by a poor couple gets the dagger but doesn't know its powers. He reaches Suryagarh, and wants revenge from Chandrakanta. However, they get romantically close and fall in love. But, Iravati succeeds in separating them. Veer unexpectedly stabs the dagger in Chandrakanta. Besides him, Iravati and her allies also brutally stab Chandrakanta, who falls off the cliff.

=== 1 years later ===
Chandrakanta returns as Suryakanta. Veer has forgot their past and is a ruthless warrior under Iravati, who now owns the magical dagger. Veer eventually regains his memory and opposes Iravati. He fights her son Swayam, the beast but is unable to kill him, and finds out that Swayam is immortal blessed by Lord Vishnu. Iravati tries to find Chandrakanta. Veer receives new power of Narsimha, a powerful avatar of Lord Vishnu. Taking the form of great Narsimha, he kills Swayam and puts an end to terror of Hirnasur.

Iravati escapes and later returns. Chandrakanta gives birth to a daughter blessed to kill Iravati, who attacks Veer. She dies when Chandrakanta's daughter touches her. The daughter is named Suryakanta. In the end, Chandrakanta and Veer establish peace and prosperity in Vijaygarh.

== Cast ==
=== Main ===
- Madhurima Tuli as Chandrakanta Pratap Singh: Queen of Vijaygarth; Veerendra's wife; Suryakanta's mother.
- Vishal Aditya Singh as Veerendra Pratap Singh: King of Vijaygarth; Chandrakanta's husband; Suryakanta's father.
- Urvashi Dholakia as Iravati Singh: Former Queen of Vijaygarth; Swayam's mother.

=== Recurring ===
- Shilpa Saklani as Ratnaprabha Singh: Former Queen of Vijaygarth; Jai's wife; Chandrakanta's mother; Suryakanta's grandmother.
- Sandeep Rajora as Jai Singh: Former King of Vijaygarth; Ratnaprabha's husband; Chandrakanta's father; Suryakanta's grandfather.
- Maleeka Ghai as Bhadrama: Iravati's former chief advisor; Chandrakanta's chief advisor.
- Shaad Randhawa as Swayam Singh: Former Prince of Vijaygarth; Iravati's son.
- Shreyas Pandit as Daksh Rajput: Nishi's husband; Aryaan's father.
- Roma Bali as Nishi Rajput: Daksh's wife; Aryaan's mother.
- Lalit Sharma as Aryaan Rajput: Daksh and Nishi's son.
- Nikhil Arya as Dhruv Dhyani: Prince of Chandangarh, Chandrakanta's friend
- Pooja Banerjee as Soorya: Chandrakanta's disguise
- Punit Talreja as Kroor Singh
- Surjit Saha as Bhuwan
- Prerna Wanvari as Vishakha "Mayavi": Ratnaprabha's sister; Chandrakanta's maternal aunt
- Charvi Saraf/Renee Dhyani as Gehna
- Rita Kaul Kotru as Aaina: Iravati's former advisor; a spirit residing inside a mythical mirror
- Surendra Thakur as monster
- Shruti Gholap as Ruchi Singh: Chandrakanta's foster mother
- Nitin Vakharia as Koopat Singh: Minister of Sooryagarh
- Ajay Arya as Tejendra "Tej" Singh: Veer's friend
- Nirmal Soni as Umang: A genie; Chandrakanta's friend
- Sunaina Shukla as Satakshi: Princess of Sooryagarh
- Deepak as Kancha: Iravati's secret shape-shifting spy
- Purvi Mundada as Champa: Veer's Lover
- Surendra Thakur as Beast
- Ethan Rao as Saand Typhoon.
- Surendra Pal as King Avantimala: Sooryagarh's monarch
- Neha Chowdhury as Daas
- Saman Sadiq Ahmad as Sooryagarh's soldier
- Shankar Mishra as Soorya's father
- Devoleena Bhattacharjee as Jia
- Kratika Sengar as Narrator in Episode 1
