= Shafaq Naaz =

Indian television actress (born 1993)

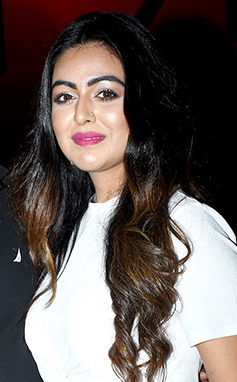
- Shafaq Naaz in 2019
- Born: Shafaq Khan; February 7, 1993 (age 33); Kota, Rajasthan, India
- Occupation: Actor
- Years active: 2010–present
- Spouse: Zeeshan Pewekar (m. 2024)
- Relatives: Falaq Naaz (sister); Sheezan Khan (brother)

Shafaq Naaz (born 7 February 1993) is an Indian television actress and trained Kathak dancer, best known for her roles as Kunti in Mahabharat (2013) and Mayuri in Chidiya Ghar (2014). She is the sister of actors Falaq Naaz and Sheezan Khan.

== Early life ==
Shafaq Naz was born as Shafaq Khan on 7 February 1993 in Kota, Rajasthan, and spent her childhood in Meerut. She was the second of three siblings and had been interested in acting and dancing since her childhood days.

== Career ==
Shafaq Naz debuted on Hindi television with Sapna Babul Ka...Bidaai (2010). After appearing in various television shows like Crime Patrol, Adalat, Fear Files, and Teri Meri Love Stories, the 2013 Indian historical epic television series Mahabharat marked her major breakthrough role. She portrayed one of the protagonists of the epic, Kunti, in the series, garnering her recognition and gaining popularity. She then starred as Mayuri Gomukh Narayan in the comedy-drama series Chidiya Ghar (2014), and her performance was appreciated by the audience. She made her debut in Hindi cinema with Guest in London (2017) playing a minor role and appeared in the series Mahakali- Anth hi Aarambh Hai (2018) and Kulfi Kumar Bajewala (2018). In 2020, she returned to the mythological genre, playing Lord Ram's mother, Maharani Kausalya, in Kahat Hanuman Jai Shree Ram. She appeared in the series Ghum Hai Kisikey Pyaar Meiin (2020). In 2022, Shafaq Naz acted in the film X or Y, which premiered on Disney+ Hotstar. In addition to television, Shafaq has acted in a number of web series, such as Halala,Shukla The Tiger and others.

== Personal life ==
Shafaq claims to have dated actor Avinash Sachdev for six months while they were filming Teri Meri Love Stories (2012); however he denied ever being romantically linked with her. In 2023, Shafaq called off her engagement with a Muscat-based businessman, whom she had been dating for three years, citing family differences.

In June 2026, Naaz revealed that she had married Mumbai based businessman, Zeeshan Pewekar, on 31 October 2024. She met her husband in January 2020 via whatsapp through her Mahabharat co-star Suhani Dhanki.

== Filmography ==
=== Television ===
Year	Title	Role	Notes	Ref.
2010	Sapna Babul Ka...Bidaai	Guni		
2011	Sanskaar Laxmi	Randhal		
2011	Crime Patrol	Riya/Trupti		
2012	Shubh Vivah	Karuna Saxena		
2012	Fear Files	Neha Paranjape		
2012	Adaalat	Arya		
2012	Teri Meri Love Stories	Pari		
2012	Love Marriage Ya Arranged Marriage	Pooja		
2012	Gumrah	Pallavi		
2013	Madventures	Contestant		
2013	Savdhaan India	Harpreet Sandhu		
2013–2014	Mahabharat	Kunti		
2014–2017	Chidiya Ghar	Mayuri Gomukh Narayan		
2018	Mahakali- Anth hi Aarambh hai	Vrinda		
2018	Kulfi Kumar Bajewala	Niyati		
2019	Laal Ishq	Kareena		
2019	Vikram Betaal Ki Rahasya Gatha	Ahalya	Cameo	
2020	Kahat Hanuman Jai Shree Ram	Kausalya		
2021	Devi Adi Parashakti	Devi Siddhi		
2021–2022	Ghum Hai Kisikey Pyaar Meiin	Shruti Pavle		
2023	Dancing on the Grave	Shakereh		

=== Films ===
Year	Film	Role	Notes
2017	Guest iin London	Sherry	
2017	Heartbeats	Urvashi	
2019	Mushkil: Fear Behind You		
2022	X or Y	Ritu	
2023	Angithee 2		

=== Web series ===
Year	Web	Role	Notes
2019	Halala	Afza Sayeed	
2020	Chitthi	Sonia	
2020	Ilzaam	Ragini	
2021	The Last Show		
2021	Shukla The Tiger	Urvashi Tripathi	
2021	Cheaters: The Vacation		
