= Hamari Wali Good News =

Indian drama television series

- Story by: Rajesh Saksham; Giselle Galbao
- Directed by: Amit Malik
- Creative director: Harkiran Kaur Ajay Bhardwaj Dhwani Gangdev
- Starring: Juhi Parmar
- Theme music composer: Vihan-Akash
- Opening theme: Hamari Wali Good News
- Country of origin: India
- Original language: Hindi
- No. of seasons: 1
- No. of episodes: 240

Production
- Executive producer: Arun Dubey
- Producers: Mautik Tolia; Sukesh Motwani
- Cinematography: Ashish Sharma
- Editor: Vijay N Panchal
- Camera setup: Multi-camera
- Running time: 22 minutes
- Production company: Bodhi Tree Multimedia

Original release
- Network: Zee TV
- Release: 20 October 2020 – 14 August 2021

Hamari Wali Good News (transl. Our Good News) is an Indian Hindi television series that aired from 20 October 2020 to 14 August 2021 on Zee TV. It stars Juhi Parmar, Shakti Anand, Subir Rana, Raghav Tiwari and Srishti Jain. It is produced by Bodhi Tree Multimedia of Mautik Tolia and Sukesh Motwani. The Serial went Off Air On 14 August 2021. It was later replaced by Meet: Badlegi Duniya Ki Reet in its timeslot.

== Plot ==
Set in Agra, Renuka Tiwari and Mukund Tiwari eagerly wait for their grandchildren but were devastated to learn that Navya their daughter-in-law can't conceive due to tubal occlusion. Mukund's step-sister diehard wants Good News from Navya and Aditya, so she forces and badmouths Renuka. Also, Mukund berates her for every attempt.

Devastated by the news her daughter-in-law can't conceive, Renuka tried many things to bring the much-awaited Good News in the family, but all her efforts went in vain. Later events show a way to Renuka, she decides to bring Good News in the family herself along with her husband Mukund Tiwari. Mukund's stepsister, on the other hand, tries to create differences between Renuka and Mukund and she was successful in separating the two, Mukund and Renuka because of Sharadh decided to divorce and then the much-awaited Good News came that Renuka is pregnant. Mukund brings Renuka back home, he initially was hesitant and shocked but later take the full responsibility of the child. Mukund's sister continues to hatch various plans along with Alok Dubey (Tiwari's son-in-law) to create misunderstandings between Renuka and Mukund and create havoc in Tiwari House. Renuka decides to expose Mukund's stepsister and to bring her reality in front of Mukund. With various efforts it is revealed that Mukund's real sister is alive. And its Sumitra who killed Mukund's mother for property.

Mukund supports Renuka and abandons Sumitra. Meanwhile, Adi turns negative and plots with Sumitra and Alok to gain property. As Mukund and Renuka go away from Agra, Adi betrays Navya and is head over heels with Aki, with whom he turned the Tiwari house into bar. Later Sumitra tricks Renuka that she has changed yet Mukund is suspicious. The trio returns to Agra and is devastated to find about Adi. Sumitra uses this opportunity and makes Adi and Aki her ally with Alok.

The baby is born and he is named as Barath. Mukund transfers all the property to Barath. In order to gain property Adi and his team plot and kidnap Navya and Barath. Later Renuka is also kidnapped and all the three are kept in a garage. In order to escape Navya informs everything to Mukund via video call. As Adi finds about Navya's escape plan, he burns the whole garage. Navya, Barath and Adi escape and Renuka dies. To escape from the clutches of evil Navya, Mukund along with Barath go to Delhi.

=== One month later ===
In Delhi, Navya owns Barath health center, where she runs juice shop. Ritwik Parmar, a wealthy businessman enters her life. Mukund still believes that Renuka is alive. Meera (Renuka's look-alike), Ritwik's aunt and Ritwik help Navya and Mukund to get rid of Adi and his team. The media mistakes Navya and Ritwik to be in love and spreads fake news which outrageous Devika Ritwik's mother. So, she is in a fix to search alliance for Ritwik. Meanwhile, Mukund realizes Meera is not his wife Renuka and accepts Renuka is dead. Soon, Ritwik and Navya fall in love and marry. Also, Mukund marries Meera. Adi enters into their lives again when he traps Ritwik's sister in love. Adi starts to live with the family.

== Cast ==
- Juhi Parmar as
  - Renuka Tiwari – Mukund's late wife; Aditya, Preeti and Bharat's mother (Dead)
  - Meera Parmar Tiwari – Renuka's lookalike; Devika's sister; Mukund's second wife; Aditya, Preeti and Bharat's stepmother
- Shakti Anand as Mukund Tiwari – Sumitra's stepbrother; Renuka's widower; Meera's husband; Aditya, Preeti and Bharat's father
- Srishti Jain as Navya Parmar (née: Agnihotri; formerly: Tiwari) – Poonam's daughter; Aditya's ex-wife; Ritwik's wife
- Shabaaz Abdullah Badi / Jatin Shah as Alok Dubey – Preeti's husband: Renuka and Mukund's Son In Law
- Farah Lakhani as Preeti Tiwari Dubey – Renuka and Mukund's daughter; Aditya and Bharat's sister; Alok's wife
- Raghav Tiwari as Aditya Tiwari – Renuka and Mukund's elder son; Preeti and Bharat's brother; Navya's ex-husband; Akanksha's husband
- Subir Rana as Ritwik Parmar – Devika's son; Akanksha's brother; Navya's husband
- Kinjal Pandya as Akanksha "Akki" Tiwari (née Parmar) – Devika's daughter; Ritwik's sister; Aditya's wife
- Bindiya Kalra as Devika Parmar – Meera's sister; Ritwik and Akanksha's mother
- Shweta Gautam as Advocate Poonam Agnihotri – Navya's mother
- Kiran Sharma as Sumitra Mishra – Mukund's stepsister
- Samiksha Bhatnagar as Vrinda
- Manish Goel as Dr. Raghav Sharma
- Arpana Agarwal as Kusum
- Vaishnavi Ganatra as Aanchal Mishra
- Jyoti Tiwari as Indu Mishra
- Anushka Srivastav as Madhu
- Rahul Dwivedi as Ashraf
- Nidhi Mathur as Shilpa
