= Brij Ke Gopal =

Indian Hindi language Mythological television series (2022)

- Genre: Mythology; Drama
- Created by: Dashmi Creations
- Screenplay by: Vikas Babulal Parikh; Neeraj Prabhakar (Dialogue)
- Story by: Brij Mohan Pandey
- Directed by: Kushal Awasthi
- Creative director: Palak Kapoor
- Starring: Paras Arora; Manul Chudasama; Amit Behl
- Theme music composer: Devendra Moghe; Shouvik Chakraborty
- Country of origin: India
- Original language: Hindi
- No. of seasons: 1
- No. of episodes: 48

Production
- Producers: Nithin Vaidya; Ninad Vaidya
- Editor: Prashant Rai
- Running time: 23 minutes
- Production company: Dashmi Creations

Original release
- Network: Dangal TV
- Release: 11 April – 6 June 2022

Brij Ke Gopal is an Indian Hindi-language mythological television series which was aired on Dangal TV under the banner of Dashmi Creations on 11 April 2022. It stars Paras Arora, Manul Chudasama and Amit Behl in their roles. The show is about the Hindu god Lord Krishna, goddess Radharani and Hindu devotee Chaitanya Mahaprabhu. The show ended on 6 June 2022 completing only 48 episodes.

== Plot ==
Brij Ke Gopal is the first show in India in which the story of Chaitanya Mahaprabhu and Nidhivan has been depicted. The story begins with Krishna and Radha. And when Chaitanya Mahaprabhu comes to earth looking for Krishna, then Shri Krishna shows Chaitanya the way to Brij. On the same side, Gyandar is the head of the entire Brij Dham. He pretends to do miracles with his divine power. He was actually a dacoit. Long ago, he had changed his disguise and settled in Brij Dham by becoming a fake of Swami in Brij. He had made the people of Brij Dham on his side with his fake miracle. The whole Brij Dham believes that the knowledgeable person is in direct contact with Shri Krishna and were Shri Krishna hears the call of the Dhara of Knowledge. One day Gyandhar performs fake miracles in front of people and the idol of Shri Krishna comes up from the earth and performs miracles. And the land on which the idol of Shri Krishna has been found, he asked for the land to build the temple, he asked for the land. But said there is a poor man and that land was a stream to run his life. Chaitanya speaks against it and Krishna is in every particle and gives the offerings of worship of Krishna to Gyandhar. Then the knowledgeable person tells him not to take the prasad and see his bundle, he speaks of black magic and troubles him, then Lord Shri Krishna sees this. People on earth are straying from religion, truth, kindness, that's why Krishna is on earth. But prepares to come and Radha becomes sad then Krishna says that every evening he will meet Radha in Nidhivan, then Radha says, if even a day does not come, you will go away forever and never earthly people. Krishna agrees to this condition and takes the form of Gopal on earth and comes to help Chanakya. And save Brij Dham from every misery, difficulty. At the end of the show, Gyandhar becomes a good person.

== Cast ==
- Paras Arora as Krishna
  - Vansh Sayani as Baby Lord Krishna
- Manul Chudasama as Radha
- Amit Behl as Chaitanya Mahaprabhu
- Pankaj Berry as Gyandhar
- Dhruti Mangeshkar as Lalita
- Gulfam Khan as Sujatha
- Tarun Khanna as Indra
- Nimai Bali as Sahukaar
- Unknown as Sujan
- Abhay Badoria as Bansi
- Zamin Chaudhary
- Dhruvi Haldankar
- Arna Badoria
- Praneet Bhat as Kantak
- Sonia Singh as Kapoota
- Priya Varlani as Yamuna Devi
- Resham Tipnis as Malati
