= MTV Webbed =

Indian television show

- Genre: Teen drama
- Created by: Vikas Gupta
- Directed by: Saurabh Arora
- Presented by: Kritika Kamra
- Country of origin: India
- Original language: Hindi
- No. of seasons: 2
- No. of episodes: 37

Production
- Producers: Ekta Kapoor; Shobha Kapoor
- Production location: India
- Camera setup: Multi-camera
- Running time: Approx. 22 minutes
- Production company: Balaji Telefilms

Original release
- Network: MTV India
- Release: September 14, 2013 – September 21, 2014

MTV Webbed is an Indian teen drama created by Vikas Gupta. It was produced by Ekta Kapoor and Shobha Kapoor under their banner Balaji Telefilms. The series premiered on MTV India.

== Plot ==
The series revolves around real-life testimonies of individuals who have been caught up in the malicious web of identity theft, pornography and other crimes of cyber abuse.

== Season overview ==
Season	No. of episodes	Originally aired		Hosts
Season	No. of episodes	Season premiere	Season finale	Hosts
1	13	14 September 2013	7 December 2013	
2	24	3 April 2014	21 September 2014	Kritika Kamra

== Episodes ==
Season	Episode	Title	Release date
1	1	The Web of Deceit	14 September 2013
1	2	Unfriended and Heartbroken	21 September 2013
1	3	Show offs Gets Shut Down!	28 September 2013
1	4	Fall from Grace	5 October 2013
1	5	Couch Hopping with the enemy	12 October 2013
1	6	Even Family is Fairplay	19 October 2013
1	7	The Pranks on You	26 October 2013
1	8	It's All Entangled	2 November 2013
1	9	Greed and Lust	9 November 2013
1	10	Cruel Intentions	16 November 2013
1	11	Friends Turns Fies	23 November 2013
1	12	Spirituality or a Scam?	30 November 2013
1	13	Friend or a Foe?	7 December 2013

== Cast ==
- Namish Taneja as Rohit
