= Namish Taneja =

Indian actor

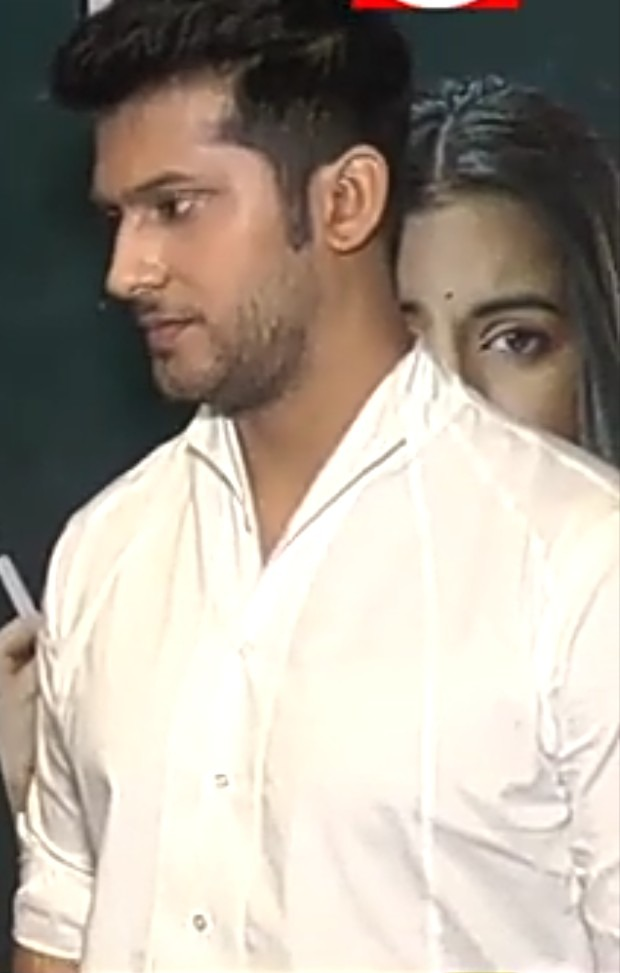
- Taneja in 2019
- Born: India
- Occupation: Actor
- Years active: 2013–present
- Notable work: Swaragini – Jodein Rishton Ke Sur; Main Maike Chali Jaungi Tum Dekhte Rahiyo; Mishri

Namish Taneja is an Indian television actor and singer. He made his acting debut in 2013 with the Sony Entertainment Television serial Ekk Nayi Pehchaan as Chirag Modi. He is best known for his portrayals of Samar Surana in Main Maike Chali Jaungi Tum Dekhte Rahiyo and Lakshya Maheshwari in Swaragini – Jodein Rishton Ke Sur.

== Career ==
He took a break from the small screen for a year and then made a television comeback as Advocate Aashish Tiwari in Zee TV’s drama Maitree in 2023. For this role, he was assessed by a lawyer friend to help get into the skin of the character better. He later left the show owing to creative differences.

== Television ==
Year	Show	Role
2013–2014	Ekk Nayi Pehchaan	Chirag Modi
2014	MTV Webbed	Rohit
2014	Pyaar Tune Kya Kiya	Sid
2015–2016	Swaragini – Jodein Rishton Ke Sur	Lakshya Maheshwari
2017–2018	Ikyawann	Satya Ajmera
2018–2019	Main Maike Chali Jaungi Tum Dekhte Rahiyo	Samar Surana
2019–2020	Vidya	Vivek Vardhan Singh
2020–2021	Aye Mere Humsafar	Ved Kothari
2023	Maitree	Advocate Aashish Tiwari
2024	Mishri	Raghav Dwivedi

=== Special appearances ===
Year	Title	Role	Ref.
2015	Udaan	Lakshya Maheshwari	
2015	Sasural Simar Ka	Lakshya Maheshwari	
2016	Krishnadasi	Lakshya Maheshwari	
2016	Comedy Nights Live	Lakshya Maheshwari	
2016	Comedy Nights Bachao	Lakshya Maheshwari	
2016	Kasam Tere Pyaar Ki	Lakshya Maheshwari	
2019	Choti Sarrdaarni	Vivek Vardhan Singh	
2019	Bigg Boss 13	Vivek Vardhan Singh	
2024	Laughter Chefs – Unlimited Entertainment	Raghav Dwivedi	
2024	Mangal Lakshmi	Raghav Dwivedi	

=== Web Series ===
Year	Show	Role	Ref.
2026	PSI Mangal Mukhi	P. P. Kadam	

== Music videos ==
Year	Song	Co-artist	Ref
2018	"Kaise Main"	Jannat Zubair Rahmani	
2021	"Ankahi Baatein"	Stefy Patel	

== Personal life ==
Taneja has been romantically linked to numerous of his co-actresses, including his close friends Tejasswi Prakash and Kanchi Singh. Negating all these rumours, in 2017, he announced his relationship with his longtime girlfriend Aanchal Sharma.

On 12 October 2024, he posted Instagram about his father's death.

== Awards ==
Year	Award	Category	Show
2015	Indian Telly Awards	Best Actor Debut (Male)	Swaragini - Jodein Rishton Ke Sur
2015	Gold Awards	Best Actor Debut (Male)	Swaragini - Jodein Rishton Ke Sur
