= Tunisha Sharma =

Indian actress (2002–2022)

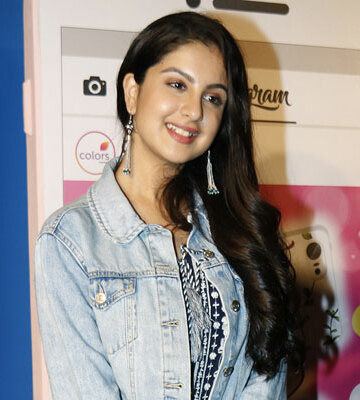
- Sharma in 2018
- Born: 4 January 2002; Chandigarh, India
- Died: 24 December 2022 (aged 20); Naigaon, Maharashtra, India
- Occupation: Actress
- Years active: 2013–2022

Tunisha Sharma (4 January 2002 – 24 December 2022) was an Indian television and film actress. She made her acting debut with Bharat Ka Veer Putra – Maharana Pratap as Chand Kawar in 2015. Sharma is best known for having played Rajkumari Ahankara in Chakravartin Ashoka Samrat, Zara/Babli in Ishq Subhan Allah and Aadhya Verma in Internet Wala Love.

Sharma made her film debut with Fitoor playing Young Firdaus and later played Young Diya in Baar Baar Dekho. In both these films, she played Katrina Kaif's younger version.

== Early life ==
Sharma was born on 4 January 2002 in Chandigarh to Vanita Sharma. In her initial years of work, she was diagnosed with depression and anxiety issues.

== Career ==
Sharma started her career with Sony Entertainment Television's Maharana Pratap as Chand Kanwar. She went on to play Rajkumari Ahankara in Colors TV's Chakravartin Ashoka Samrat. In 2016, she made her film debut as Young Firdaus in Fitoor. In the same year, she played Young Dia in Baar Baar Dekho and Mini in Kahaani 2: Durga Rani Singh.

In 2017, Sharma played Mehtab Kaur in Sher-e-Punjab: Maharaja Ranjit Singh. From 2018 to 2019, she played Aadhya Verma in Colors TV's Internet Wala Love.

In 2019, she appeared in Zee TV's Ishq Subhan Allah as Zara/Babli. In 2021, she was seen in season 2 of SAB TV's Hero – Gayab Mode On as ASP Aditi. In 2022, she played the lead role in Sony SAB show Ali Baba: Dastaan-E-Kabul Chapter 1 opposite Sheezan Khan.

She is slated to appear posthumously in Abbas–Mustan's film 3 Monkeys.

== Death ==
On 24 December 2022, in a studio in Naigaon, Maharashtra, Sharma hanged herself in the make-up room of co-star Sheezan Khan on the set of the television serial Ali Baba: Dastaan-E-Kabul Chapter 1. She was taken to a hospital where she was declared dead on arrival. Sheezan Khan was booked for abetment to suicide and was arrested after her mother filed a case against him. Sharma and Khan had reportedly been in a relationship but had broken up shortly before her death.

== Filmography ==
=== Television ===
Year	Title	Role	Notes	Ref.
2015	Bharat Ka Veer Putra – Maharana Pratap	Chand Kanwar		
2015	Chakravartin Ashoka Samrat	Rajkumari Ahankara		
2015	Bhanwar – Kalyug ki Hairatangez Kahaniyaa	—N/a		
2016	Gabbar Poonchwala	Sanya		
2017	Sher-e-Punjab: Maharaja Ranjit Singh	Mehtab Kaur		
2018	Ishq Mein Marjawan	Aadhya Verma	Guest	
2018	Silsila Badalte Rishton Ka	Aadhya Verma	Guest	
2018–2019	Internet Wala Love	Aadhya Verma		
2019–2020	Ishq Subhan Allah	Zara/Babli		
2021	Hero – Gayab Mode On	ASP Aditi Jammval	Season 2	
2021	Maddam Sir	ASP Aditi Jammval	Guest	
2021	Wagle Ki Duniya – Nayi Peedhi Naye Kissey	ASP Aditi Jammval	Guest	
2022	Ali Baba	Shehzaadi Mariam alias Marjina	Chapter 1: Dastaan-E-Kabul	

=== Films ===
Year	Title	Role	Notes	Ref.
2016	Fitoor	Young Firdaus		
2016	Baar Baar Dekho	Young Diya		
2016	Kahaani 2: Durga Rani Singh	Minnie Sinha		
2018	Krina	Ruhani		
2019	Dabangg 3	Hostile girl	Cameo	
2026	3 Monkeys	TBA	Posthumous release	

=== Web series ===
Year	Title	Role	Ref.
TBA	Adiyal	—N/a	

=== Music videos ===
Year	Title	Singer	Ref.
2021	"Sardari (Chapter 1)"	Manavgeet Gill	
2021	"Pyaar Ho Jaayega"	Vishal Mishra	
2021	"Nainon Ka Ye Rona Jaaye Na"	Raj Barman	
2022	"Tu Baithe Mere Samne"	Raj Barman	
2022	"Heeriye"	Abhi Dutt	
2022	"Tu Baithe Mere Samne"	Raj Barman	
2022	"Paani Na Samajh"	Raj Barman	
