= New Law College (Pune) =

Law college in Maharastra

New Law College, Pune
- NLC PUNE
- Type: Deemed/Private
- Established: 1978
- Affiliations: Bharati Vidyapeeth Deemed University
- Chancellor: Dr. Shivajirao Kadam
- Vice-Chancellor: Dr. M M Salunkhe
- Principal: Dr. Shashikant C. Hajare
- Dean: Dr. Jyoti Dharm
- Location: Pune, Erandwane Campus, Paud Road, Rambagh Colony, Kothrud, Maharashtra, India
- Nickname: NLC
- Website: www.bvpnlcpune.org

Bharati Vidyapeeth University’s New Law College was established in 1978. It is one of the constituent units of Bharati Vidyapeeth University Pune, recognized by Bar Council of India and the University Grant Commission. The college is also recognized under 2f & 12b of UGC Act 1956. The college is reaccredited with an A+ grade by NAAC. The college was inaugurated in the year 1978 at the hands of Y. V. Chandrachud then chief justice of India. The foundation stone of the New Law College building was laid down in the year 2004 at the hands of the chief justice of India K. G. Balakrishnan. The new building of the law college was inaugurated in the year 2005 at the hands of Ramesh Chandra Lahoti, also while serving as chief justice of India. The college's silver jubilee was celebrated in 2003.
