= Sheezan Khan =

Indian television actor (born 1994)

- Born: 9 September 1994 (age 32); Meerut, Uttar Pradesh, India
- Occupation: Actor
- Years active: 2013–present
- Known for: Jodha Akbar; Tara From Satara; Ali Baba: Dastaan-E-Kabul
- Relatives: Falaq Naaz (sister); Shafaq Naaz (sister)

Sheezan Khan (pronounced [ˈʃiːzɑːn kʰɑːn]; born 9 September 1994) is an Indian television actor. He is best known for portraying young Akbar/Sultan Murad Mirza in Jodha Akbar and Ali Baba in Ali Baba: Dastaan-E-Kabul.

== Early life ==
Khan was born on 9 September 1994 in Meerut to Kahkashan and brought up in Mumbai. He graduated from the University of Mumbai. He has two older sisters, Falaq Naaz and Shafaq Naaz, both of whom are television actresses. He is a fitness enthusiast, pet lover, and a frequent speaker at TEDx.

== Career ==
Khan started his acting career in 2013, with the historical drama Jodha Akbar.

In 2016, he portrayed Vinay Saxena in Silsila Pyaar Ka opposite Sheen Dass. He then appeared as Prince Kartikay/Yuvraj Bhoj in the historical drama Chandra Nandini in 2017 and Prithvi Vallabh - Itihaas Bhi, Rahasya Bhi in 2018.

In 2019, he appeared as Raghav in Ek Thi Rani Ek Tha Raavan, and as Arjun Priya in Tara From Satara.

In February 2020, he joined Nazar 2 opposite Shruti Sharma. Amid Lockdown and COVID-19 pandemic, despite having good ratings, Nazar 2 went off-air. In 2021, he was seen as Aarya in Pavitra: Bharose Ka Safar.

In 2022, he portrayed the lead role of Ali Baba opposite Tunisha Sharma in Sab TV show Ali Baba: Dastaan-E-Kabul. In December 2023, he appeared as Dr. Arjun Singh Thakur in Colors TV's Chand Jalne Laga. Since September 2025, he was signed to play male lead, Siddhu in Zee TV's Ganga Mai Ki Betiyan.

== Media image ==
In 2026, he was listed in 40 Under 40 by the Indian edition of Variety.

== Personal life ==
He previously dated actress Mrinal Singh.

On 24 December 2022, Khan's co-star Tunisha Sharma committed suicide by hanging herself in his make-up room on the set of the television serial Ali Baba: Dastaan-E-Kabul. Sheezan was arrested after Sharma's mother filed a charge of abetment against him. On 5 March 2023, Khan was released on bail after 70 days in jail.

== Filmography ==
=== Television ===
Year	Title	Role	Notes	Ref.
2013	Jodha Akbar	Young Akbar		
2014–2015	Jodha Akbar	Sultan Murad Mirza		
2016	Silsila Pyaar Ka	Vinay Saxena		
2017	Chandra Nandini	Rajkumar Kartikay		
2018	Prithvi Vallabh - Itihaas Bhi, Rahasya Bhi	Yuvraj Bhoj		
2019	Ek Thi Rani Ek Tha Raavan	Raghav		
2019–2020	Tara From Satara	Arjun Priya		
2020	Nazar 2	Apurv Singh Chaudhary		
2021–2022	Pavitra: Bharose Ka Safar	Arya		
2022	Ali Baba: Dastaan-E-Kabul	Ali Baba		
2023	Fear Factor: Khatron Ke Khiladi 13	Contestant	9th place	
2023	Chand Jalne Laga	Dr. Arjun Singh Thakur		
2024–2025	Ghum Hai Kisikey Pyaar Meiin	Anubhav "Bhavi" Deshmukh		
2025-present	Ganga Mai Ki Betiyan	Siddhanth "Siddhu" Singh Thakur		

=== Web series ===
Year	Title	Role	Notes	Ref.
2025	Tu Aashiki Haii	DSP Arjun Walia		

== See also ==
- List of Indian television actors
