= Sasural =

Sasural (lit. 'father-in-law's household' in Hindi and Urdu) may refer to these Indian films:

- Sasural (1941 film), a Hindi film
- Sasural (1961 film), a Hindi film
- Sasural (1984 film), a Hindi film

== See also ==
- Sasural Simar Ka, an Indian soap opera, 2011-2018
  - Sasural Simar Ka 2
- "Sasural Genda Phool", a song by A. R. Rahman and Rekha Bhardwaj from the 2009 Indian film Delhi-6
- Sasural Genda Phool, an Indian soap opera, 2010-2012
  - Sasural Genda Phool 2
