= Simply Baatein with Raveena =

- Written by: Shivam Kansal
- Directed by: Pankaj Sudhir Mitra
- Presented by: Raveena Tandon
- Country of origin: India
- Original language: Hindi
- No. of episodes: 12

Production
- Producer: Akhumzi Jezile
- Editors: Amaar Jha , Rajesh Mandal
- Camera setup: Multi-camera
- Running time: Approx. 45 minutes
- Production company: Urban Brew Studios

Original release
- Network: Sony Pal
- Release: 7 September – 23 November 2014

Simply Baatein With Raveena is an interactive talk/chat show produced by Urban Brew Studios and hosted by Raveena Tandon. The show started airing on 7 September 2014 on Sony Pal. Raveena interacts with celebrities to discuss topics relating to womanhood.

== Episodes ==
Episode No.	Guest(s)	Original air date	Notes
Episode 1	Ritu Pahva (interior designer), Shraddha Salla(Vastu Expert), Ridhi Dogra & Raqesh Vashisth, Divya Dutta, Sussanne Khan (Home Decor Diva)	7 September 2014	Vastu, Home decor ideas, interaction with celebrity couple.
Summary	In the first episode, Raveena interacts with Ritu Pahva, an interior designer and Shraddha Salla, a Vastu Shastra expert and takes tips and advices that can be used whilst constructing one's home. After that, Ridhi Dogra and Raqesh Vashisth comes as a celebrity couple and discuss their life style. Raveena interacts with her next guest and friend Divya Dutta. Finally Sussanne Khan comes and shares some tips in home decor.		
Episode 2	Dr. Nirmala Shetty (Natural hair therapist),Kiran Bhawa(Hairspa owner), Kanta Motwani (Hair Stylist), Shriya Saran (film celebrity)	14 September 2014	Focus on Hair- from treatment, maintenance, what new in hair styling.
Summary	This episode focus on Hair care. Raveena discuss about it to Dr. Nirmala Shetty, Kiran Bhawa and Kanta Motwani. Then Shriya Saran shares her experience when acting and styling hair.		
Episode 3	Dr. Swati Shrivastav (Dermatologist ), Dr. Smita Naram (Ayurveda Practitioner & Founder of Ayushakti Ayurved), Dr. Poornima Mahatre (cosmetic dermatologist and dermo-surgeon), Aashka Goradia (TV celebrity)	21 September 2014	Focus on Skin Care- Treatment, tips and advice on Skin Care
Summary	Raveena interacts with Dr. Swati, Dr. Smita and Dr. Poornima on Skin Care. Aashka Goradia shares her experience in TV industry and skin care.		
Episode 4	Palak Muchhal (Singer), Soni Razdan(Mahesh Bhatt's wife and actress), Jyoti Modhe (Assoc. Professor), Darsheel Safary (Teen Celebrity)	28 September 2014	Understanding Teenagers
Summary	Raveena interact with Palak which have recently complete teenage and jump to the adult world.		
Episode 5	Payal Tiwari (Yoga Expert), Yasmine Karachiwala (Fitness professor), Dr. Indu Tandon (physiotherapist), Sangram Singh (wrestler / celebrity)	5 October 2014	Health, Food and Fitness
Summary	Raveena talks with her guest on food, fitness and health tips.		
Episode 6	DJ Perna Singh (DJ Jockey), Krishika Lulla (Producer)	12 October 2014	Woman in work field
Summary	Raveena invite Yogita a female truck driver, an inspiration to woman and Suhaag, a spiderwoman		
Episode 7	Alka Yagnik (Singer), Shaina NC (Fashion designer and Social worker)	19 October 2014	Woman entrepreneurship-Work at Home
Summary	Raveena talks to an entrepreneur caterer and share their experience. She talk with another woman entrepreneur caterer Nitu.		
Episode 8	Urvashi Dholakia (TV celebrity)	26 October 2014	TBA
Summary	TBA		
Episode 9	-	2 November 2014	TBA
Summary	TBA		
Episode 10	-	9 November 2014	TBA
Summary	TBA		
Episode 11	-	16 November 2014	TBA
Summary	TBA		
Episode 12	-	23 November 2014	TBA
Summary	TBA		
