= Queen (Hindi TV series) =

2026 Indian Hindi-language political drama television series

- Genre: Legal drama Political thriller Family drama
- Created by: Mangesh Kanthale
- Developed by: Jay Verma
- Directed by: Mangesh Kanthale; Poojan Mehta; Sachin Teli; Raj Pawar; Suyash Deshpande
- Creative directors: Amit Anand; Pooja Sharma
- Starring: Shagun Sharma; Kartavya Yadav
- Country of origin: India
- Original language: Hindi
- No. of seasons: 1
- No. of episodes: 5

Production
- Producers: Mangesh Kanthale; Jay Verma (Mangalya); Ajay Kumar Singh (LWE)
- Cinematography: Rajput Nitin Singh; Aman Chauhan; Gaurav Kulkarni; Sunny Tak
- Camera setup: Multi-camera
- Running time: 20–34 minutes
- Production companies: Mangalya Productions; Lovely World Entertainment

Original release
- Network: Colors TV
- Release: 16 November 2026 – present

Queen is an Indian Hindi-language political thriller drama television series that airs on Colors TV from 16 November 2026 and streams digitally on JioHotstar. Produced by Mangesh Kanthale under Mangalya Productions in association with Ajay K. Singh's Lovely World Entertainment, it stars Shagun Sharma and Kartavya Yadav in lead roles.

== Cast ==
=== Main ===
- Shagun Sharma as Neeti Singh
- Kartavya Yadav as Raj Singh Tomar
- Zakir Hussain as Minister Mahendra Pratap Singh Tomar
- Shruti Seth as Akshara Singh Tomar

=== Recurring ===
- Dinesh Mehta as Samrat Singh Tomar
- Gungun Uprari as Gauri Singh Tomar "Choti Maa"
- Nikki Sharma as Meera
- Rajeshwari Datta as Kalyani Mukherjee
- Angad Dishant as Inspector Vikram
- Sandeep Mehta

== Production ==
=== Development ===
In July 2026, Colors announced the show, starring Shagun Sharma in the lead role. The series is presented as a political revenge/romantic drama. It is produced by Mangalya Productions.

=== Casting ===
Shagun Sharma was roped in as the female lead, a rape survivor from a politician, Neeti. Debutant Kartavya Yadav was cast to portray the male lead, Raaj Tomar. Zakir Hussain was signed to play as Minister Mahendra Pratap Singh Tomar. Shruti Seth was selected to portray Akshara Singh Tomar.

=== Release ===
The first announcement promo was released on 8 September 2026. A second promo was released on 9 October revealed the cast, featuring Sharma, Yadav and Shruti Seth and Zakir Hussain. Via a third promo released on 23 October, the premiere date and timeslot were announced. Queen premiered on 16 November 2026, replacing Seher – Hone Ko Hai in its 8.30 p.m. slot.
