= Teen Thay Bhai =

- Theatrical Release Poster
- Directed by: Mrighdeep Singh Lamba
- Written by: Gautam Mehra; Mehul Suri
- Produced by: Rakeysh Omprakash Mehra; PVR Pictures; PS Bharathi; Rajiv Tandon
- Starring: Om Puri; Shreyas Talpade; Deepak Dobriyal; Ragini Khanna
- Narrated by: Pawan Malhotra
- Cinematography: Ashok Mehta
- Edited by: Arindam Ghatak
- Music by: Daler Mehndi; Rajat Dholakia; Sukhwinder Singh; Ranjit Barot
- Production companies: PVR Pictures; Rakeysh Omprakash Mehra Pictures
- Distributed by: PVR Pictures
- Release date: 15 April 2011
- Country: India
- Language: Hindi
- Budget: ₹ 8 crore

Teen Thay Bhai (transl. Once there were 3 brothers) is a 2011 Indian comedy film directed by Mrighdeep Lamba, produced by Rakeysh Omprakash Mehra Productions and PVR Pictures. The film stars Om Puri, Shreyas Talpade, Deepak Dobriyal, Ragini Khanna and Yograj Singh.

== Plot ==
Teen Thay Bhai is the story of three brothers separated for many years and reunited by their grandfather's will.

The story starts with an introduction of three brothers. The eldest, Chixie Gill is a small-time shop owner with 3 obese daughters whom no one wants to marry and a nagging wife (whom he would like to send back to her parents' house). He dreamed of opening a big cloth store in his younger days, but their grandfather was not ready to sell their village land for the money needed. The middle brother, Happy Gill, is a dentist who has only one diagnosis for any tooth ailment: shifting pain. As a result, he has no patients but a long line of creditors (whose teeth he has removed more than once). He wants to get rid of all his debts and open a big dry-cleaning shop. He was in love with Gurleen Kaur in his younger days when they got separated. The youngest, Fancy Gill, is an aspiring actor who wants to go Hollywood but only gets roles in Punjabi cinema, where his habit of putting in disco and English dialogues leads to him being thrown out quite often.

On the death of their grandfather, by the requirement of his will, they need to get together for 3 years on the day of his death anniversary before midnight at the cabin. If not, the property around the cabin (worth crores of rupees) will be forfeited. Also, every year one of them has to take care of their grandfather's ashes, starting from the eldest, and pass it on to the next younger on that day. They somehow manage to make it through two years for the much-needed money, but the last year holds a lot for them. Snowstorms, trespassers, women with drugs, etc. bring them close to each other and make up their differences.

== Cast ==
- Om Puri as Chixie Gill
- Deepak Dobriyal as Happy Gill
- Shreyas Talpade as Fancy Gill
- Ragini Khanna as Gurleen Kaur
- Yograj Singh as Khetarpal Gill

== Production ==
=== Casting ===
According to Rakeysh Omprakash Mehra, "Omji, Deepak and Shreyas suited the roles perfectly. Given the age difference, the eldest brother is a fatherly figure. And their chemistry, or the lack of it, becomes pivotal for the story to be told."

=== Filming ===
The film was shot at Gulmarg, Baramula district, Kashmir in 44 days.

== Critical reception ==
Anupama Chopra of NDTV wrote "Debutant director Mrighdeep Singh Lamba strains hard to make you laugh – Teen Thay Bhai includes everything from fart jokes to a purposefully loud Ram Leela – but I barely smiled" and gave it 1.5 stars out of five.

== Soundtrack ==
The music is composed by Sukhwinder Singh, Daler Mehndi, Rajat Dholakia, and Ranjit Barot. Lyrics are penned by Gulzar. The music is primarily bhangra style highly influenced by western music.

=== Track listing ===
No.	Title	Music	Singer(s)	Length
1.	"Aar Dariya"	Sukhwinder Singh	Sukhwinder Singh
2.	"Chakkar Chakkar"	Sukhwinder Singh	Sukhwinder Singh
3.	"Main Chalna Bhool Gaya"	Ranjit Barot, Sukhwinder Singh	Mohit Chauhan
4.	"Pigeon Kabootar"	Daler Mehndi, Rajat Dholakia	Daler Mehndi
5.	"Bhai Ke Chakkar" (Fultu Mix)	Sukhwinder Singh, Ranjit Barot	Hard Kaur, Sukhwinder Singh
6.	"Pigeon Kabootar" (Full On Mix)	Daler Mehndi, Ranjit Barot	Daler Mehndi, Hard Kaur
7.	"Teen Thay Bhai" (Full Mood Mein)	Daler Mehndi, Rajat Dholakia	Daler Mehndi
