= Gangs of Haseepur =

- Genre: Comedy
- Presented by: Ragini Khanna
- Country of origin: India
- Original language: Hindi
- No. of episodes: 17

Production
- Producer: Essel Vision Productions
- Camera setup: Multi-camera
- Running time: 20–30 mins
- Production company: Essel Vision Pvt. Ltd.

Original release
- Network: Zee TV
- Release: 26 April – 13 July 2014

Gangs of Haseepur is an Indian reality comedy show, which premiered on 26 April 2014. It airs on Zee TV. The show replaced Bh Se Bhade.

== Judges ==
- Mandira Bedi
- Tanishaa Mukerji

== Host ==
- Ragini Khanna
- Krushna Abhishek
- Raju Srivastav
- Bharti Singh
- Suresh Menon
- Sugandha Mishra
- Srikant Maski
