= Sasural Genda Phool =

Indian television series

- Genre: Family drama Romance
- Created by: Ravi Ojha
- Written by: Mitali Bhattacharya; Zama Habib
- Directed by: Ravi Ojha; Rakesh Kumar
- Country of origin: India
- Original language: Hindi
- No. of episodes: 573

Production
- Producers: Ravi Ojha; Zama Habib
- Running time: 21-23 minutes
- Production company: Ravi Ojha Productions

Original release
- Network: StarPlus
- Release: 1 March 2010 – 21 April 2012

Related
- Sasural Genda Phool 2

Sasural Genda Phool is an Indian television drama series that aired on StarPlus starring Jay Soni and Ragini Khanna. It aired during weekday evenings from 1 March 2010 to 21 April 2012. It is based on the backdrop of Old Delhi.

== Plot ==
Suhana Bajpai is a gorgeous, energetic young woman who lost her mother Vidisha when she was a child. Kamal Kishore Bajpai, Suhana's father, is unable to provide Suhana with sufficient time despite his best efforts. Suhana has a legendary temper and a materialistic mentality as a result of being deprived of his attention and Vidisha's love. In an act of spontaneous anger because of a bad break-up, she accepts to marry anyone Kamal chooses for her.

Ishaan Kashyap is an IT professional who grew up in a joint household and is polite, shy, and good-natured. However, he lacks a partner due to his introverted and awkward personality around women. He gives up and resolves to marry whomever his family determines to be a good match for him.

Kamal Kishore Bajpai and Ishaan coincidentally meet. After observing the Kashyap family's love and kindness, Kamal realises that this is the home that Suhana requires in her life. He requests Ishaan's hand for Suhana in marriage, which the Kashyaps accept. Suhana and Ishaan get married.

However, the marriage gets off to a bad start. Suhana makes it clear to Ishaan that she does not love him, as she is still suffering from the break-up. He decides to allow her time to heal her wounds. Suhana eventually begins to bond with the family, particularly with Shailaja, Ishaan's aunt (called Badi Ma by everyone), whom Suhana admires as the motherly figure she has been lacking in her life. Suhana gradually begins to care for Ishaan as a result of living together. She also learns more about the family with time.

The Kashyaps have several hidden pains and dark pasts. Ishwar Kashyap, Shailaja's ambitious husband and the eldest child of Dadaji and Dadiji, had deserted her and their children - Inder and Panna - for a supposedly bright future in the USA, whereby he remarried a woman named Meera, much to the whole family’s shock. Post this, Dadaji breaks connections with Ishwar and doesn’t consider him as a son of the family. And in order to make up for Ishwar’s absence, his younger brother Alok whole-heartedly sacrificed all his dreams and ambitions to look after his family and cater to their needs. Another dark secret is that Radha, the foster daughter of Dadaji and Dadiji, is still suffering from the pain of being raped by an unknown man on her wedding night. She is unable to heal from her pain as the child born out of that incident, Deepak, has an uncanny resemblance to the rapist. Ilesh (the son of Dadaji and Dadiji’s daughter), Ishaan and Inder's cousin, is perpetually unemployed due to his fun loving, mischievous and laidback attitude, and not interested in working, despite the family’s best efforts, but somehow, Ilesh gets a job with a construction company and earns a lot of money, which raises suspicion in the minds of Ishaan, Alok and Inder. His wife Disha is struggling to conceive. These are the sorrows that make Suhana realize that life is about accepting them and moving on with a smile, whereby she manages to bond well over time with her in-laws and Ishaan’s niece, Meethi.

Still, Suhana doesn't find herself consciously in love with Ishaan, She tries to leave the house but decides to stay and take care of Shailaja after she falls ill from the shock. Each time she mentions leaving the house, she doesn't realise that she is hurting Ishaan very terribly.

Ishaan's childhood friend, Sonali, is invited over to make Suhana jealous. Suhana realizes that she does love Ishaan and eventually confesses her love for Ishaan in front of everyone, and Sonali goes home. Ishaan and Suhana go to Goa for their honeymoon where they bare their souls to one another and come closer. Meanwhile, depressed after losing his job, and being unemployed for three months, Panna's husband Raunak leaves her and his family. He does this so that he can become stable and get a high-paying job again. At this time, Deepak also comes to stay with his family, having settled things with his mother. As time passes in Raunak's absence, the fractured relationship between Panna and her mother-in-law is repaired, leading to the repair in the relationship between the Kashyaps and the Sharmas.

Suhana unexpectedly faints at Holi, leading to the family think that she is pregnant. But they later find out that she is not pregnant but is shockingly suffering from a brain tumor. However, they are overjoyed to later learn that the tumor is completely benign. Suhana undergoes her surgery and is completely healed.

Ishaan meets with an accident. He loses the memory of the past two years of his life, thus forgetting Suhana and his marriage to her. Suhana stays in the Kashyap house as Shashikala, Disha's friend. After being around "Shashikala", Ishaan feels connected to her but cannot pursue her because she is married. During this time, Ishwar returns to India, after failed attempts to contact his family, and one fine day, he bumps into his father and Shailaja, where Dadaji refuses to acknowledge him, and threatens to take action on him, as he tries apologizing to Shailaja.

While the elders of the family get the news of Ishwar's return, Dadiji begs Dadaji to forgive Ishwar, much to the family's shock, thereby compelling Dadaji to take stern action on anyone who tries contacting Ishwar.

After a few hilarious turns, Ishaan decides to marry Shashikala, come what may. At the wedding altar, he reveals that he has regained his memory, thanks to tripping over a bench that Suhana had overturned in a fit of anger. Not much after this incident, a fateful meeting at the temple between Dadiji and Ishwar takes place, where Ishwar begs his mother’s forgiveness but to no avail, where she reminds him that he’s more accountable to Shailaja.

Disha is depressed as she learns of her inability to conceive a child, which comes as a shocker for the family wondering why the matter was hidden from them. Suhana finds a baby girl in the park and brings her home, suggesting that Disha adopt her. Everyone is surprised and touched by this gesture. As the baby named Khushi by the family makes an impact on them, it starts affecting Suhana and Ishaan's married life as Suhana ignores Ishaan to take care of Khushi. But troubles attack the Kashyap family threefold - Ilesh is found guilty of bribery and money laundering. His company refuses to recognize him as an employee. Also, Khushi's birth parents turn up and the family tearfully hands over the baby to her parents. What makes it worse is that the family gets a shocker to know that Ishwar is back in Delhi, from Inder and Panna, after paying him a visit, and Shailaja meeting Ishwar secretly, on Dadiji's insistence, much to Dadaji and Alok's displeasure.

Ishaan expresses his happiness over his promotion and his transfer to Mumbai, and is happy because this is his chance for him to prove himself, as he has been battling for his identity within the family. He is fed up of being treated as a child and kept away from the serious decisions of the family. Ishaan and Suhana move to Mumbai and get to know the Mumbai life. Meanwhile, Ilesh is acquitted and found innocent, with the help of a diary.

In Mumbai, Ishaan meets up with Sonali. Ishaan and Suhana find out that Sonali has married Abhishek, who is obsessive about her. Ishaan finds out that Sonali is suffering abuse because of this. Meanwhile, Ishwar has returned to the Kashyaps. Although no one wants to accept him, he is trying to be forceful with them to accept and forgive him. Panna is pregnant, but Ishwar ruins the joy. Suhana accidentally finds out about Ishwar's return and feels the desperate need to connect to Shailaja. She rushes to Delhi and finds out that Ishwar has conspired against the family to gain ownership of the house, because he wants to sell it, under the pretext of selling Panna’s jewellery. She exposes this to the entire family, leaving them shocked to the core.

Finally, as the family gets closure about this, Dadaji throws Ishwar out of the house and severes ties with him. While Ishaan is furious that everyone knew about Ishwar's return and his conspiracy, but did not let him in on the matter, Dadiji blames herself for Ishwar's deception, and pleading Shailaja to meet him.

Suhana sees Sonali with Ishaan and suspects him of having an affair with her. She leaves him and returns to Delhi. She then brings Shailaja and Alok to Mumbai and they help her find out the truth; that Abhishek was hitting Sonali. Suhana apologises to her and gets back with Ishaan. Upon returning to Delhi, Suhana declares to the family that she wishes to start working. She receives an offer to star in a television show as the lead. Rano, her mother-in-law, is against it, but everyone else supports her. Ilesh accompanies Suhana to the shoot and later enjoys handling and managing her career as her agent. This leads to a disturbance in the family as Rano feels that Suhana is ignoring her wifely duties towards Ishaan, and Disha feels that Ilesh is not getting his due respect from Suhana as her older brother-in-law because of being employed by her. Ishaan also gets egoistic over the fact that Suhana earns more than him and is a star. However, Alok shatters those illusions for him and he realizes his mistake.

In the midst of all this, Sanjana, Suhana's sister, and Deepak fall in love with each other. Deepak tells the truth to Sanjana that he is an illegitimate child and Sanjana accepts it. But she is reluctant to tell the truth to her father. Radha's husband, who sold her to the man who raped her, mocks the engagement ceremony by revealing the truth to everyone, and Kamal Kishore rejects the alliance between Deepak and Sanjana. The young generation of the Kashyaps decides to help Deepak and Sanjana elope, but Radha stops it. Eventually, everyone convinces Kamal and he agrees; Deepak and Sanjana get married. Everyone lives happily ever after.

== Cast ==
=== Main ===
- Jay Soni as Ishaan Kashyap: Rano and Alok's son; Ishika's brother; Suhana's husband (2010- 2012)
- Ragini Khanna as Suhana Bajpai Kashyap: Vidisha and Kamal's daughter; Sanjana's sister; Ishaan's wife (2010–2012)
- Supriya Pilgaonkar as Shailaja Kashyap: Ishwar's wife; Inder and Panna's mother; Meethi's grandmother (2010–2012)

=== Recurring ===
- Mahesh Thakur as Kamal Kishore Bajpai: Vidisha's widower; Suhana and Sanjana's father (2010–2012)
- Vaishnavi Mahant as Vidisha Bajpai: Kamal's wife; Suhana and Sanjana's mother (2010-2011) (Dead)
- Suraj Thapar as Alok Kashyap: Gayatri and Ambarnath's son, Ishwar, Urmi and Radha's brother; Rano's husband; Ishaan and Ishika's father (2010–2012)
- Shruti Ulfat as Rano Kashyap: Alok's wife; Ishaan and Ishika's mother (2010–2012)
- Sadiya Siddiqui as Radha Kashyap: Gayatri and Ambarnath's daughter; Ishwar, Alok and Urmi's sister; Sudhir's former wife; Deepak's mother (2010–2012)
- Sudhir Pandey as Ambarnath Kashyap: Gayatri's husband; Ishwar, Alok, Urmi and Radha's father; Inder, Panna, Ishaan, Ishika, Deepak and Ilesh's grandfather; Meethi’s great-grandfather(2010–2012)
- Anita Kanwal as Gayatri Kashyap: Ambarnath's wife; Ishwar, Alok, Urmi and Radha's mother; Inder, Panna, Ishaan, Ishika, Deepak and Ilesh's grandmother; Meethi’s great-grandmother (2010–2012)
- Sulabha Arya as Shanti Chintamani Shukla: Kamal's aunt; Suhana and Sanjana's grandaunt (2011–2012)
- Indraneel Bhattacharya as Ishwar Kashyap: Ambarnath and Gayatri's son; Alok, Urmi and Radha's brother; Shailaja's husband; Inder, Panna and Ruby's father; Meethi's grandfather (2010–2011)
- Jiten Lalwani as Inder Kashyap: Shailaja and Ishwar's son; Panna's brother; Rajni's husband; Meethi's father (2010–2012)
- Bhairavi Raichura as Rajni Kashyap: Inder's wife; Meethi's mother (2010–2012)
- Muskaan Uppal as Meethi Kashyap: Rajni and Inder's daughter (2010–2012)
- Moonmoon Banerjee as Panna Kashyap Sharma: Shailaja and Ishwar's daughter; Inder's sister; Raunak's wife (2010–2011)
- Sailesh Gulabani as Raunak Sharma: Kamini and Vishwanath's son; Panna's husband (2010–2011) / Anil Parihar: Raunak's lookalike; Piya's husband (2011)
- Sham Mashalkar as Ilesh Bhardwaj: Urmi's son; Disha's husband (2010–2012)
- Pooja Kanwal/Ridheema Tiwari as Disha Bhardwaj: Ilesh's wife (2010-2011) / (2011-2012)
- Akshay Sethi as Deepak Sharma: Radha and Sudhir's son; Sanjana's husband (2010–2012)
- Tapeshwari Sharma as Sanjana Bajpai Sharma: Vidisha and Kamal's daughter; Suhana's sister; Deepak's wife (2010–2012)
- Neha Narang as Ishika Kashyap: Rano and Alok's daughter; Ishaan's sister (2010–2012)
- Beena Bhatt as Meena: Househelp at Kashyap house (2010–2012)
- Banwari Lal Jhol as Gopi Kaka : Househelp at Bajpai house (2010–2012)
- Pradeep Kabra as Sudhir: Radha's former husband; Deepak's father (2010, 2012)
- Saurabh Dubey as Vishwanath Sharma: Kamini's husband; Raunak's father (2010–2011)
- Kanika Dang as Kamini Sharma: Vishwanath's wife; Raunak's mother (2010–2011)
- Jayati Bhatia as Manjula "Manju" Saigal: Loud neighbour of Kashyaps (2010–2011)
- Mohit Malhotra as Siddhant "Sid" Bhatnagar: Suhana's ex-boyfriend (2010)
- Nishant Singh Malkani as Raj: Sanjana's friend (2010)
- Shagufta Ali as Sumitra Bua (2010)
- Ankit Mohan as Akash (2010)
- Karan Thakur as Mohit (2011)
- Sujata Vaishnav as Sharda Bua : Ambarnath's sister (2011)
- Shruti Bapna as Piya Parihar: Anil's wife (2011)
- Firdaus Mevawala as Inder’s boss (2011)
- Hunar Hali as Sonali Abhishek Jhavre: Ishaan's friend; Abhishek's wife (2010–2012)
- Mehak Manwani (cameo) (2011)
- Sarika Nanda as Rachit: Khushi's relative (2011)
- Rajiv Kumar as Mohit: Rano's friend (2011)
- Amit Dolawat as Abhishek Jhavre: Sonali's husband (2012)
- Suchita Trivedi as Savita (2012)
- Armaan Tahil as Shekhar (2012)
- Manasi Parekh as Gulaal (2011)
- Sanaya Irani as Khushi Kumari Gupta Singh Raizada (2012)
- Pooja Gor as Pratigya Saxena Singh (2011)

== Sequel ==
A sequel of the series titled Sasural Genda Phool 2 aired from 7 December 2021 to 15 April 2022 on Star Bharat starring Jay Soni and Shagun Sharma as the new leads.

== Reception ==
=== Critics ===
The Hindu stated, "Sasural Genda Phool on Star Plus has proved to be a breath of fresh air from the stereotyped image of ‘saas-bahu (mother in law-daughter in law) serials. The performances of seasoned actors like Sudhir Pandey, Anita Kanwal, Supriya Pilgaonkar, Sooraj Thapar and Sadia Siddiqui provide the flavour of a real Indian joint family where, as Gaurav insists, there is a mix of all light-hearted emotions that will redefine the way viewers perceive our society through television."

The Indian Express quoted the series as 'slice-of-life, light-hearted'. It also stated: "It not only defied the formula of fiction but also proved that viewers are open to watching good stories where serious issues are tackled in a positive way with the right mix of emotions, drama, fun and humour."

=== Ratings ===
Initially, it was the slot leader ranging between 2.5 and 3 TVR. Soon, it also featured in top 10 Hindi GEC with its peak of 5+ TVR. However, after May 2011, the ratings of the series started to decrease.

On first week of January 2011, it was the second most watched Hindi GEC after Saath Nibhaana Saathiya, garnering 5.8 TVR. In the third week of January 2011, it occupied third position with 5.49 TVR.

== Awards ==
Year	Award	Category	Recipient	Result	Ref
2010	Indian Telly Awards	Most Popular Actor in a Supporting Role (Female)	Supriya Pilgaonkar	Won	
2010	Indian Telly Awards	Most Popular Actor (Female)	Ragini Khanna	Won	
2010	Indian Television Academy Awards	Best Serial	Sasural Genda Phool	Won	
2010	Indian Television Academy Awards	Best Actor Drama (Critics)	Jay Soni	Won	
2010	Indian Television Academy Awards	Best Actress in a Supporting Role	Supriya Pilgaonkar	Won	
2010	BIG Star Entertainment Awards	Best TV Entertainer	Ragini Khanna	Won	
2011	Zee Gold Awards	Best Actor	Jay Soni	Won	
2011	Zee Gold Awards	Find of the year	Ragini Khanna	Won	
2011	Indian Television Academy Awards	Best Actress In a Supporting Role	Bhairavi Raichura	Won	
