= Harphoul Mohini =

Indian television series

- Genre: Drama; Action; Romance; Thriller
- Created by: Tanuja Chaturvedi; Niranjan Thade
- Developed by: Anand Vardhan
- Written by: Tanuja Chaturvedi
- Screenplay by: Fatima; Shubham; Dialogue; Zaheer Shaikh
- Story by: Sachin Rane; Ajit Singh
- Directed by: Rohit Dwivedi
- Creative director: Bharat Chouksey
- Starring: See below
- Theme music composer: Shekhar Bhujbal
- Opening theme: Mil Paayenge Kaise...Harphoul Mohini
- Composers: Nishant Raja & Debjit Roy
- Country of origin: India
- Original language: Hindi
- No. of seasons: 1
- No. of episodes: 119

Production
- Executive producer: Rajesh Ram Singh
- Producers: Rajesh Ram Singh; Pradeep Kumar; Piya Bajpayee; Shaika Parween
- Production locations: Mumbai; Kerala
- Editors: Ashish Singh; Khalid Ali
- Camera setup: Multi-camera
- Running time: 16-19 minutes
- Production companies: Cockcrow & Shaika Entertainment

Original release
- Network: Colors TV
- Release: 13 June – 8 December 2022

Harphoul Mohini is a Hindi language action romance neo noir family entertainer adventure horror supernatural thriller show based on a Haryanvi Jaat boy and Malayali girl produced by Cockcrow & Shaika Entertainment. It aired from 13 June 2022 to 8 December 2022 on Colors TV, starring Shagun Sharma and Zebby Singh.

== Plot ==
This is the story of Harphoul and Mohini, both are completely different from each other.

Mohini lives in Kerala with her parents and three younger sisters Malli, Velli and Savitri. Mohini's father Vijayan has lost his job and there is no boy in Kerala who can marry his daughters without dowry. Meanwhile, if Vijayan does not pay the money, then he will have to leave his house as well. Mohini promises her father that she will find a boy who does not want dowry and that she will be able to save house with her dowry gold.

Meanwhile, Harphoul, who lives in Haryana with his mother, disabled brother and sister-in-law, has to save his ancestral land from his uncle. It is decided in the Panchayat that if Harphoul is not married in a month, then the land will belong to the Panchayat.

Mai's niece, Saroj, who lives in Kerala, arranges the marriage of Harphoul and Mohini. Harphoul's uncle Balwant Chowdhury tries hard to stop Harphoul's marriage but finally Harphoul and his family reach to Kerala for the wedding. Harphoul and Mohini do not like each other but agree to the marriage for the sake of their families.

== Cast ==
=== Main ===
- Zebby Singh as Harphoul Singh Chaudhary: Harveer and Phoolmati's son; Santok's brother; Balwant and Sharda's nephew; Rajendra and Surendra's cousin; Mohini's husband; Vijayan and Shyamala's son-in-law; Malli, Velli and Savitri's brother-in-law (2022)
- Shagun Sharma as Mohini Singh Chaudhary (née Unni): Vijayan and Shyamala's daughter; Malli, Velli and Savitri's sister; Harphoul's wife; Harveer and Phoolmati's daughter-in-law; Santok's sister-in-law (2022)

=== Recurring ===
==== Singh Choudhary family ====
- Shivendraa Saainiyol as Harveer Singh Chaudhary; Balwant's brother; Phoolmati's husband; Santok and Harphoul's father (2022) (Dead)
- Supriya Shukla as Phoolmati "Maai" Chaudhary: Harveer's wife; Santok and Harphoul's mother (2022)
- Amal Sehrawat as Santok Singh Chaudhary: Harveer and Phoolmati's son; Harphoul's brother; Balwant and Sharda's nephew; Rajendra and Surendra's cousin; Salini's husband (2022)
- Sonali Nikam as Salini Singh Chaudhary: Santok's wife; Harveer and Phoolmati's daughter-in-law; Harphoul's sister-in-law (2022)
- Tej Sapru as Balwant Singh Chaudhary: Harveer's brother; Sharda's husband; Rajendra and Surendra's father (2022)
- Jaanvi Sangwan as Sharda Singh Chaudhary: Balwant's wife; Rajendra and Surendra's mother (2022)
- Kunal Jaiswal as Rajendra Singh Chaudhary: Balwant and Sharda's son; Surendra's brother; Devyani's husband (2022)
- Priya Gautam as Devyani Singh Chaudhary: Rajendra's wife; Balwant and Sharda's daughter-in-law; Surendra's sister-in-law (2022)
- Karan Maan as Surendra Singh Chaudhary: Balwant and Sharda's son; Rajendra's brother; (2022)
- Manohar Teli as Banwari Singh Chaudhary: Harveer and Balwant's cousin; Santok, Harphoul, Rajendra and Surendra's uncle (2022)
- Preeti Gandwani as Dr. Saroj Singh Chaudhary: Harveer and Phoolmati's niece; Santok and Harphoul's cousin; Rajan and Rahul's mother (2022)

==== Unni family ====
- Pankaj Vishnu as Vijayan Unni: Shyamla's husband; Mohini, Malli, Velli and Savitri's father; Harphoul's father-in-law (2022)
- Resham Rampur as Shyamla Unni: Vijayan's wife; Mohini, Malli, Velli and Savitri's mother; Harphoul's mother-in-law (2022)
- Iqra Shaikh as Malli Unni: Vijayan and Shyamla's daughter; Mohini, Velli and Savitri's sister; Harphoul's sister-in-law (2022)
- Ashi Sharma as Velli Unni: Vijayan and Shyamla's daughter; Mohini, Malli and Savitri's sister; Harphoul's sister-in-law (2022)
- Aadhya Barot as Savitri "Savi" Unni: Vijayam and Shyamla's daughter; Mohini, Malli and Velli's sister; Harphoul's sister-in-law (2022)

=== Other Recurring Cast ===
- Akshay Suri as Sukhvinder "Sukha": Harphoul's best friend (2022)
- Vinn Modgill as Abhimanyu "Manyu": Harphoul's best friend (2022)
- Ayan Kapoor as Aadesh: Harphoul's best friend (2022)
- Trilokchander Singh as Sarpanch (2022)
- Manish Khanna as Bhaiji: Balwant's boss (2022)
- Pradeep Duhan as Inspector (2022)
- Nupur Yadav as Ragini (2022)
- Anny Singh as Shushila: Mohini's friend (2022)
- Abha Parmar as Ganga (2022)
- Diya Singh as Minoo (2022)
- Sumit Setia as Sunder (2022)
- Vishaal Kapoor as Sandeep: Ragini's husband (2022)
- Deepak Soni as inspector Sameer Chauhan (2022)
