= Dil Hai Chota Sa Choti Si Asha =

- Created by: White Script
- Creative director: Inder kochar
- Presented by: Jay Soni; Ragini Khanna
- Country of origin: India
- Original language: Hindi
- No. of episodes: 13

Production
- Executive producer: Jahnvi Obhan
- Production location: Mumbai
- Running time: 50 minutes
- Production company: White Script

Original release
- Network: Sony Pal
- Release: 14 September – 7 December 2014

Dil Hai Chota Sa Choti Si Aasha (transl. The heart is small, and so is the hope) is an Indian television reality game show hosted by Jay Soni and Ragini Khanna. It started on 14 September 2014 and aired every Sunday on Sony Pal. The show is produced by White Script and executed by SOL productions.

== Concept ==
The show starts with four women from different backgrounds who have emotional and inspiring stories. They are invited to play through different rounds and collect virtual money. At the end of the show, Sony Pal converts the winning sum into cash, which can help empower the women going forward.
