= Jay Soni =

Indian television actor (born 1986)

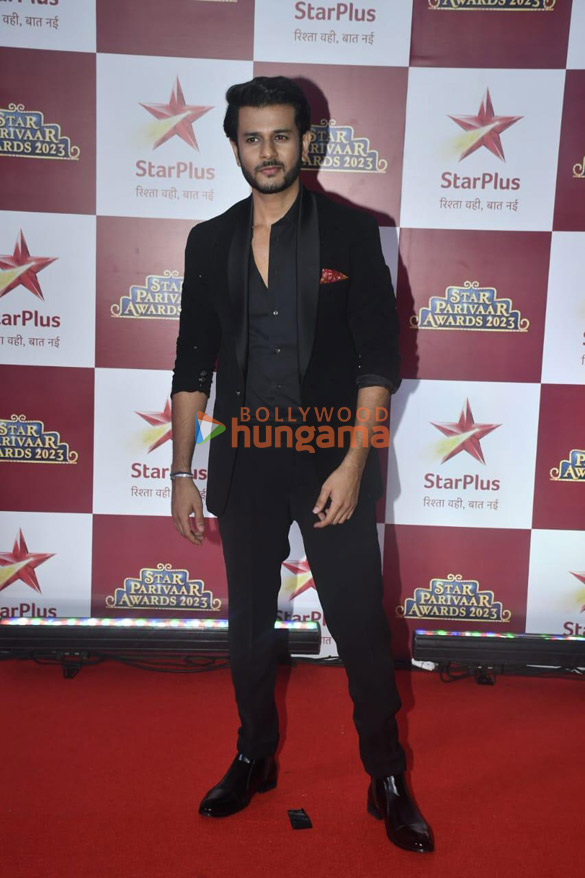
- Soni in 2023
- Born: 25 December 1986 (age 39); Surat, Gujarat, India
- Occupations: Actor; host
- Years active: 2004–present
- Known for: Sasural Genda Phool Lamboo Rastoo
- Spouse: Pooja Shah (m. 2014)
- Children: 1
- Relatives: Harsh Soni (brother); Neerav Soni (brother); Kiran Soni (mother)

Jay Soni (born 1986) is an Indian actor and host who is known for his work in Hindi television. He is mainly known for his role in television show Sasural Genda Phool. He was also a contestant on reality shows like Jhalak Dikhhla Jaa 5 and Nach Baliye 7. He made his digital debut with Vikram Bhatt's web series Twisted 3.

== Filmography ==
=== Films ===
Year	Film	Role	Ref.
2004	Fida		
2004	Dil Maange More		
2007	MP3: Mera Pehla Pehla Pyaar		
2007	Buddha Mar Gaya	Pawan	
2018	Lamboo Rastoo	Dhaivat Yagnik	

=== Television ===
Year	Serial	Role	Notes	Ref.
2005–2008	Baa Bahoo Aur Baby	Jigar Thakkar	Supporting Role	
2005	Remix	Karan	Supporting role	
2006	Raavan	raavan	Teenage version of raavan	
2007	Dharti Ka Veer Yodha Prithviraj Chauhan	Samar Singh	Negative Role	
2010–2012	Sasural Genda Phool	Ishaan Kashyap	Main Lead	
2013–2014	Sanskaar – Dharohar Apnon Ki	Jay kishan Vaishnav	Main Lead	
2016	Santoshi Maa	Krishna	Cameo	
2016	Gangaa	Krishna	Cameo	
2016	Waaris	Krishna	Cameo	
2016	Bhabiji Ghar Par Hain!	Krishna	Cameo	
2016–2017	Kuch Rang Pyar Ke Aise Bhi	Dr. Ritwik Sen	Cameo	
2017	Bhaag Bakool Bhaag	Bakool "Dhollu" Vasavda	Main Lead	
2018	Laal Ishq – Best Friend	Dushyant (Episode 12)	Episodic Role	
2020	Gudiya Hamari Sabhi Pe Bhari	Hulchul Pandey	Cameo	
2021–2022	Sasural Genda Phool 2	Ishaan Kashyap	Main Lead	
2022–2023	Yeh Rishta Kya Kehlata Hai	Abhinav Sharma	Main Lead	
2025	Dilwali Dulha Le Jayegi	Kartik "KK" Kaushal	Main Lead	

=== Web Series ===
Year	Title	Role	Notes	Ref.
2020	Twisted 3	Karan Sabharwal	Debut	
2025	Qaid S1	Aarav	Rocket Reels	
2025	Phir Se Restart	Neel Gupta	Pocket TV	
2025	Hacker King S1	Arjun Bankar (Popularly known as "Digi King")	Story TV	
2025	Love Station S1	Nachiket Nath alias "Love Guru"	Gujarati series	
2025	Hacker King S2	Arjun Bankar (Popularly known as "Digi King")	Story TV	
2025	London Return Dulha	Armaan	Story TV	

=== Reality shows ===
Year	Show	Role	Notes	References
2011	Sa Re Ga Ma Pa Li'l Champs 2011	Host		
2011	Jhalak Dikhhla Jaa 4	Guest		
2012	Jhalak Dikhhla Jaa 5	Contestant-Not Selected	Week 7: "Wild Card Special"	
2014	Dil Hai Chota Sa Choti Si Asha	Host		
2015	Killerr Karaoke Atka Toh Latkah	Guest		
2015	Nach Baliye 7	Contestant	11th place	
2015	Comedy Superstar	Host		
2017	Rasoi Ki Jung Mummyon Ke Sung	Guest		

=== Dubbing roles ===
Film title	Actor	Character	Dub language	Original language	Original year release	Dub year release	Notes
Agent	Akhil Akkineni	Ramakrishna "Ricky" alias "Wild Saala"	Hindi	Telugu	2023	2024	

== Awards and nominations ==
Year	Award	Category	Show	Result
2010	ITA Awards	Best Actor Critics	Sasural Genda Phool	Won
2012	Indian Telly Awards	Best Actor Critics	Sasural Genda Phool	Nominated
2019	CAMA Awards	Best Actor Debut	Lamboo Rastoo	Won
2023	ITA Awards	Best Actor Popular	Yeh Rishta Kya Kehlata Hai	Nominated

== See also ==
- List of Indian television actors
- List of Indian film actors
