= Sony Pal =

Hindi general entertainment channel

- Country: India

Programming
- Picture format: 1080i HDTV (downscaled to letterboxed 576i for the SDTV feed)

Ownership
- Owner: Sony
- Parent: Sony Pictures Networks
- Sister channels: See List of channels owned by Sony Pictures Networks

History
- Launched: 1 September 2014

Links
- Website: sonypal.in

Availability

Streaming media
- Sony LIV: Sony Pal Live

== Broadcast and Satellite Details ==
Parameter	Detail
Satellite	GSAT-15 (93.5° E)
Frequency	11470 MHz
Polarity	Vertical (V)
Symbol Rate	29500 kSps
Standard / Format	DVB-S / MPEG-2 (SD)
Platform	DD Free Dish
Encryption	Clear (FTA)

Sony Pal (stylised as Sony पल) (Hindi for Moment) is an Indian free-to-air television channel that was launched on 1 September 2014. It was initially aimed at women with women-oriented Hindi-language programming, now focused on family-oriented programming. The channel is owned by Sony Pictures Networks. The channel is available on Dish Network and Sling TV in USA and Canada.

== History ==
Sony Pal was launched on 1 September 2014 originally as a pay-TV channel, with Juhi Chawla as its ambassador. The channel mostly aired women-centric reality shows to compete with mainstream Hindi GECs like Star Plus, ZEE TV, Colors whose core TG is also women-oriented.

The channel had a low audience share of 11,000 during the first weeks of its launch, as compared to other channels like Life OK, Star Plus, Zee TV and Colors TV. Due to this, the channel ceased its business operations on 13 February 2015, broadcasting re-runs of Sony TV and Sony SAB shows.

The channel was then rebranded and turned into free-to-air TV channel, as it started syndication of former SET and Sony SAB series like Taarak Mehta Ka Ooltah Chashmah, CID and Baalveer. Sony Pal started gathering a fair audience share by 2016.The Channel was pay television channel for 3 years after that from 1 April 2025 it returns to DD free dish along with other channels

== Programming ==
=== Original series ===
Year	Show
2014	Dil Hai Chota Sa Choti Si Asha
2014	Khushiyon Kii Gullak Aashi
2014	Piya Basanti Re
2014	Simply Baatien With Raveena
2014	Tum Saath Ho Jab Apne
2014–2015	Ek Rishta Aisa Bhi
2014–2015	Hamari Sister Didi
2014–2015	Sinhasan Battisi
2014–2015	Yeh Dil Sun Raha Hai

=== Current Programme ===
Year	Show
2026	Taarak Mehta Ka Ooltah Chashmah
2026	Chidiya Ghar
2026	Ramayan
2026	Hastinapur Ke Veer
2026	Yam Hain Hum
2026	Diwali Ki Rasoi - Har Ghar Ka Swad
2026	Indian Idol S16
