= Shagun Sharma =

Indian television actress

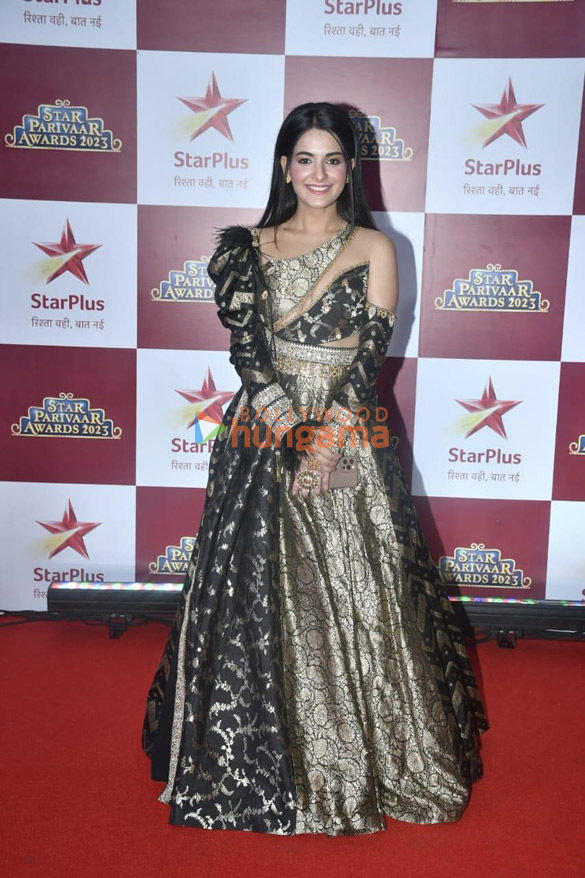
- Sharma in 2023
- Born: 28 October; Palampur, Himachal Pradesh, India
- Occupation: Actress
- Years active: 2015–present
- Known for: Yeh Hai Chahatein; Harphoul Mohini; Kyunki Saas Bhi Kabhi Bahu Thi 2
- Partner(s): Aman Gandhi (2025–2026)

Shagun Sharma is an Indian actress and model who works in Hindi television. She is best known for her portrayals in Ishk Par Zor Nahi, Sasural Genda Phool 2, Harphoul Mohini and Kashvi Sabharwal in Yeh Hai Chahatein. Sharma earned wider recognition for her portrayal as Paridhi Virani in legendary soap opera Kyunki Saas Bhi Kabhi Bahu Thi 2. In 2026, she participated in the Indian reality show Khatron Ke Khiladi 15.

== Early life ==
Sharma was born on 28 October in a Hindu family in Palampur, Himachal Pradesh.

== Personal life ==
While doing Kyunki.. in November 2025, Sharma revealed that, she is dating her onscreen brother portrayed by Aman Gandhi much before signing the show. During inside the Bigg Boss 20 house, Gandhi confessed that they were broke up in September 2026.

== Career ==
Sharma started her career in 2015 playing Sanjana Kapoor in the Star Plus show Kuch Toh Hai Tere Mere Darmiyaan. After that she was seen playing parallel lead and supporting roles in several Hindi series.

In March 2021, she next played the role of Sonali “Sonu” Malhotra in Sony TV show Ishk Par Zor Nahi. In December 2021, she made a breakthrough in her career with the lead role of Titli in Star Bharat show Sasural Genda Phool 2, replacing Ragini Khanna from the previous season.

In June 2022, Sharma was seen as the lead Mohini Vijayan opposite Zebby Singh in Harphoul Mohini. In September 2022, Sharma starred alongside Adnan Khan and Rakesh Bedi in a short film Mera Number Kab Aayega, which was officially selected and premiered at various film festivals and winning over 25 awards.

From July 2023, Sharma was seen as the lead role of Kashvi Bajwa in StarPlus's Yeh Hai Chahatein after its second generation leap, opposite Pravisht Mishra until the show went off air in September 2024.

From July 2025 to May 2026, Sharma portrayed the role of Paridhi “Pari” Virani in Kyunki Saas Bhi Kabhi Bahu Thi 2. Her portrayal received positive response from audience due to the character arc from grey shaded to a positive one and earned an award at Indian Television Academy Awards. She bid adieu to the show after it took a 10-year leap.

In August 2026, She participated in the stunt based reality series Khatron Ke Khiladi season 15. On 5 September, she was eliminated in the season's second elimination, finishing in 12th place. Ahead of the season premiere, Sharma alleged that fellow contestant Gaurav Khanna had bullied her during the filming of the series.

== Filmography ==
Year	Film	Role	Notes	Ref.
2019	Tennis Buddies			
2020	A Surprise To My Dad	Tanvi	Short film	
2022	Mera Number Kab Aageya	Mrs. Saxena	Short film	

=== Television ===
Year	Title	Role	Note	Ref.
2015	Kuch Toh Hai Tere Mere Darmiyaan	Sanjana "Sanju" Kapoor		
2016–2017	Kuch Rang Pyar Ke Aise Bhi	Khushi		
2017	Gangaa	Ashi Jha		
2017	Iss Pyaar Ko Kya Naam Doon 3	Meghna Narayan		
2017–2018	Tu Aashiqui	Richa Thakur		
2019	Laal Ishq	Pernia	Episode: "Khel Dehshat Ka"	
2019	Paramavatar Shri Krishna	Maharani Satyabhama		
2021	Ishk Par Zor Nahi	Sonali "Sonu" Malhotra Rathore		
2021–2022	Sasural Genda Phool 2	Tanya "Titli" Awasthi		
2022	Harphoul Mohini	Mohini Singh Chaudhary		
2023–2024	Yeh Hai Chahatein	IAS Kashvi Sabharwal Bajwa		
2025–2026	Kyunki Saas Bhi Kabhi Bahu Thi 2	Paridhi "Pari" Virani Parekh		
2026	Kyunki Rishton Ke Bhi Roop Badalte Hain	Paridhi "Pari" Virani Parekh		
2026	Khatron Ke Khiladi 15	Contestant	12th place	
2026–present	Queen	Neeti Singh		

=== Web series ===
Year	Show	Role	Ref.
2020	Dating Siyapaa	Chameli	

=== Music videos ===
Year	Song	Notes
2020	Sang Tere	Rekha Maliya
2020	Yaar Kende	Seven Strings

== Awards and nominations ==
Year	Award	Category	Role	Result	Ref.
2025	Indian Television Academy Awards	Best Actress in a Negative Role	Paridhi Virani Singh	Won	

== See also ==
- List of Hindi television actresses
- List of Indian television actresses
