= Ghoomketu =

Indian Hindi Language film

- Promotional poster
- Directed by: Pushpendra Nath Mishra
- Written by: Pushpendra Nath Misra
- Produced by: Anurag Kashyap; Vikas Bahl
- Starring: Nawazuddin Siddiqui; Ragini Khanna; Anurag Kashyap
- Cinematography: Satya Rai Nagpaul
- Edited by: Pushpendra Nath Misra; Kratika Adhikari
- Music by: Score: Zubin Balaporia; Songs: Sneha Khanwalkar; Jasleen Royal
- Production companies: Phantom Films; Sony Pictures Networks
- Distributed by: ZEE5
- Release date: 22 May 2020
- Country: India
- Language: Hindi

Ghoomketu is a 2020 Indian Hindi-language comedy drama film written and directed by Pushpendra Nath Misra. The film stars Nawazuddin Siddiqui, Ragini Khanna, Anurag Kashyap, Ila Arun, Raghuvir Yadav and Brijendra Kala in the main lead roles while also featuring Amitabh Bachchan, Ranveer Singh, Sonakshi Sinha and Chitrangada Singh in cameo appearances. The film was produced under two production banners Phantom Films and Sony Pictures Networks Productions, acquired by ZEE5. The plot based on an aspiring novice writer from a small town who runs away to Mumbai to achieve his dreams. The film was streamed via ZEE5 platform on 22 May 2020 instead of theatrical release due to COVID-19 pandemic in India.

== Synopsis ==
Ghoomketu is the story of an aspiring writer from a UP village called Mahona. His father referred by everyone as 'Dadda' (elder brother) has a very high temper and married for the second time after death of his first wife, whereas his younger brother a local muscle-man remains unmarried after father of his lover refuses to marry his daughter with him. Over a period of time he becomes a strong politician of the region but is never out of word of Dadda. He is recently married to a girl in a group marriage ceremony, charitable function which was organized by his uncle. As fate would have it, his to be bride gets exchanged in the confusion of the group marriage and he ends up with a fat lady Janaki Devi and out of disappointment he doesn't even see her face even after 10 days marriage.

Dadda is deeply disappointed by antics of his Ghoomketu and never supports his dream of becoming a writer, however his aunt gives supports him wholeheartedly and gives him money and supplies enough to last 1 month in Mumbai so that he can fulfill his dream. After his disappearance his family launches a complaint in police and his uncle pressurizes police to find him within a month.

Here in Mumbai Badlani, a lazy corrupt officer is assigned the case to find him in 30 days or be sent on a punishment posting. As fate would have it Ghoomketu finds nighttime accommodation in Badlani's Tailoring shop, however since there is no photo of Ghoomketu he is not able to identify him. Ghoomketu is of simple and jovial nature and befriends everyone around him including son and wife of Badlani.

Ghoomketu faces rejection everywhere, disheartened he decides to return. On his way home after visiting Shahrukh Khan's office his file of scripts is stolen. He goes to the police station where Badlani is working and as he is giving out his details Badlani realizes he is the person he is looking for. As he goes to verify his details Ghoomketu leaves for home. After a close chase he finally sees Ghoomketu's train departing and his final hope of retaining his post.

When he reaches home, he whole heartedly apologizes to his wife and after some convincing she accepts his apology. Later his father comes terms with his son's aspirations and they have an emotional reunion. He is however pleasantly surprised to find Janaki has lost weight (because of depression) and when she reveals her face for the first time, he realizes how beautiful she is. His scripts are sold by a thief to a scrap dealer, which is bought by Bhelpuri vendor and reaches Amitabh Bachhan whilst he got Bhelpuri wrapped in Ghoomketu's script. He uses these lines in the climax of his film, which Ghoomketu watches at a local theater with his wife.

== Cast ==
- Nawazuddin Siddiqui as Ghoomketu
- Ragini Khanna as Janki Devi
- Richa Chadda as Pagaliya
- Anurag Kashyap in a triple role as
  - Inspector Badlani Jr.
  - Raja Badlani
  - Sr. Badlani
- Razak Khan as Sailu Nai
- Brijendra Kala as Editor Joshi
- Deepika Amin as Mrs. Badlani, Inspector's wife
- Raghuvir Yadav as Dadda
- Ila Arun as Santo Bua
- Swanand Kirkire as Guddan Chacha
- Jayant Gadekar as Inspector Shinde
- Varun Kulkarni as Assistant Director of Ghoomketu
- Satya Ranjan as Pagal
- Amitabh Bachchan in a cameo appearance
- Ranveer Singh in a cameo appearance
- Sonakshi Sinha in a cameo appearance
- Chitrangada Singh in a cameo appearance
- Nikkhil Advani in a cameo appearance
- Lauren Gottlieb in a cameo appearance
- Huma Qureshi in a cameo appearance
- Mohammad Nawaz as young Badlani

== Production ==
Nawazuddin signed in this project to play the titular role of Ghoomketu in the lead role and it was the first time he signed to play a comic role in his film acting career. The film marks maiden collaboration for Anurag Kashyap and Nawazuddin Siddiqui as Anurag was roped in to play the small role as a police cop. Lyricist Swanand Kirkire was roped into play the role of chacha to Nawazuddin.

The shooting of the film was completed in 2014 and due to financial troubles as well as inability to find ideal distributors for film release, the film release was delayed for years. The film was initially speculated to have its theatrical release on 16 November 2018 but was postponed.

== Soundtrack ==
Ghoomketu

Soundtrack album by Sneha Khanwalkar Jasleen Royal
- Released: 20 May 2020 (Film)
- Recorded: 2020
- Genre: Feature Film soundtrack
- Language: Hindi
- Label: Sangeet Music
- Producer: Sneha Khanwalkar

Track listing
No.	Title	Lyrics	Music	Singer(s)	Length
1.	"Truck Song"	Pushpendra Nath Misra	Sneha Khanwalkar	Bappi Lahiri
2.	"Inspector Badlani Song"	Pushpendra Nath Misra	Sneha Khanwalkar	Ramon; Varsha Singh Dhanoa
3.	"Bird Song"	Pushpendra Nath Misra	Jasleen Royal	Jasleen Royal
