= Ragini Khanna =

Indian actress (born 1984)

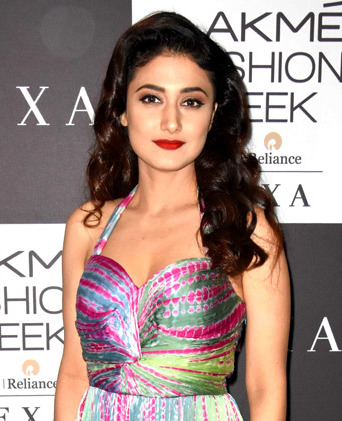
- Khanna in 2017
- Born: 9 December 1984 (age 41); Mumbai, Maharashtra, India
- Occupation: Actress
- Years active: 2008–2021
- Relatives: Govinda (uncle); Krushna Abhishek (cousin); Arti Singh (cousin); Soumya Seth (cousin)
- Family: See Govinda family

Ragini Khanna (born 9 December 1984) is an Indian film and television actress, model, comedian, singer and television host. She has hosted various reality shows, such as India's Best Dramebaaz (2013) and Gangs of Haseepur (2014). She is best known for her role as Bharti in Bhaskar Bharti and Suhana Kashyap in Sasural Genda Phool. She was a contestant on Jhalak Dikhhla Jaa 4 in 2010. She also appeared in Comedy Nights with Kapil portraying many characters.

== Early life ==
Khanna's parents are Praveen Khanna and Kamini Khanna. She is the 2nd child of her parents. Her elder brother, Amit Khanna is also an actor and has worked in serials like Yeh Dil Chahe More. Her mother, Kaamini Khanna is a writer, music director, singer, anchor and founder of 'Beauty with Astrology'. Ragini is the granddaughter of classical singer Nirmala Devi and popular 1940s actor Arun Kumar Ahuja. She is also the niece of Indian actor Govinda and the cousin of Krushna Abhishek (actor, stand-up comedian), Arti Singh (TV actress) and Soumya Seth (TV actress). Khanna's father died in October 2015.

== Career ==
=== Television ===
Khanna made her acting debut with the daily soap opera Radhaa Ki Betiyaan Kuch Kar Dikhayengi on NDTV Imagine as "Ragini Sharma". In 2009, Khanna played in Sony TV's comedy show Bhaskar Bharti. Khanna also appeared as a guest in an episode of 10 Ka Dum, Khanna won an amount of 1,000,000 rupees and donated the money for charity. She was also seen as a guest in Imagine TV's reality show Big Money: Chota Parda Bada Game.

In March 2010, Khanna appeared in Star Plus's show Sasural Genda Phool. She played the lead role as Suhana Kashyap, an arrogant, but good at heart woman who marries a man of a middle class joint family. The show went off air on 21 April 2012. Her portrayal as Suhana won her some awards including BIG Star Most Entertaining Television Actor - Female. She also appeared in a special episode of Kaun Banega Crorepati 4.

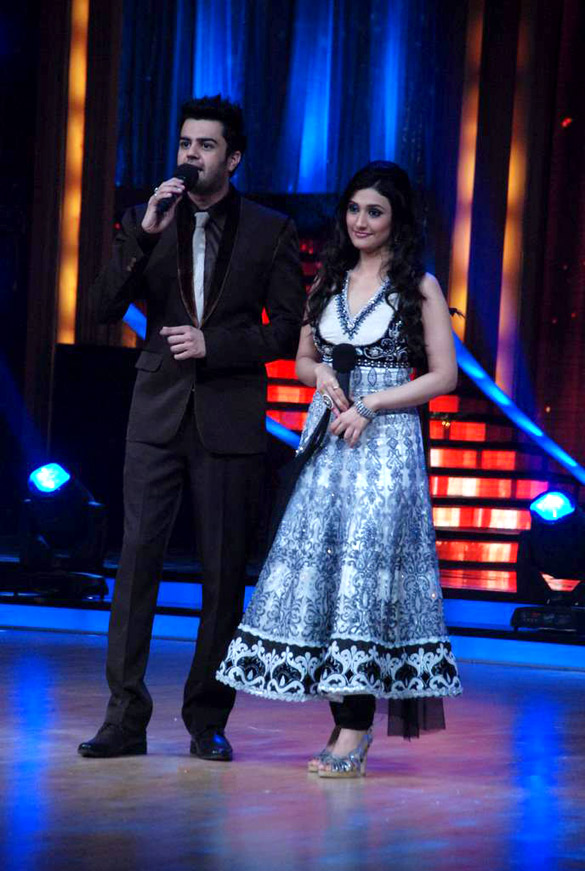
Khanna with Manish Paul on the sets of Jhalak Dikhhlaa Jaa 5.

In December 2010, Khanna participated in the 4th season of Jhalak Dikhhla Jaa. and was eliminated at 9th position on 14 February 2011. In 2011, Khanna participated in a celebrity singing reality show Star Ya Rockstar on Zee TV. Khanna's next project was the 5th season of Jhalak Dikhhla Jaa as host. She also did a cameo role in Life OK's show Main Lakshmi Tere Aangan Ki. In January 2013, Khanna was seen in Life OK's cookery show Welcome - Baazi Mehmaan-Nawaazi ki. She appeared in Comedy Nights with Kapil and Comedy Nights Live. In 2016, Khanna hosted a show on ABP News called Good Morning with Ragini Khanna.

=== Films ===
In 2011, Khanna made her Hindi Film debut with Rakeysh Omprakash Mehra's comedy film Teen They Bhai. In 2013, Khanna worked in Punjabi film Bhaji in Problem. the film earned a good box office collection. Khanna is scheduled to feature opposite Nawazuddin Siddiqui in Pushpendra Mishra's comedy film Ghoomketu which was released in 2020 in ZEE5 platform on 22 May 2020 instead of theatrical release due to COVID-19 pandemic in India.

== In the media ==
Khanna was termed as the "Next Big Thing" on Television by JD Majethia, Varun Badola and Rajan Shahi, in a Hindustan Times poll. They praised the actress for her talent, looks and range of emotions. Hindustan Times further termed her as one of the "most vivacious actresses" on television.

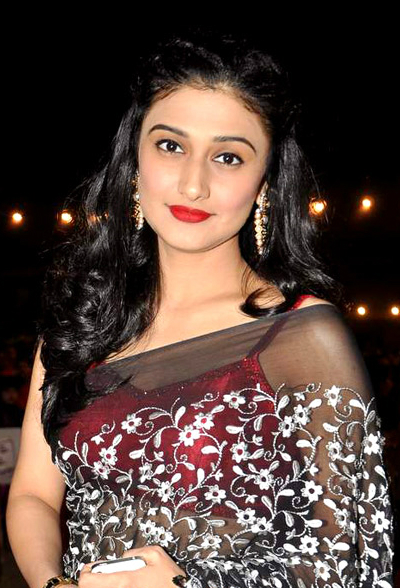
Khanna at an event in 2013

Khanna is known for her frank and assertive nature, and has been outspoken on issues including the commercialisation of festivals such as Navratri. She has also indulged in a number of controversies. During Star Ya Rockstar, the actress reacted defensively when her fellow contestants expressed their preference for the performance of another contestant, Chhavi Mittal. In an interview after her elimination from the show, Khanna said, "I always motivated Chhavi whenever she was nervous before her performance. I think I have a certain aura which prompts people to like me. I am always nice to people who are nice to me. I don't throw tantrums for any rhyme or reason." During Life OK's culinary show Welcome, Khanna and her co-contestant Nigaar Khan were seen arguing during the show. Khanna vented her anger against the channel through her Twitter account, where she claimed that in an episode of the show, Khanna's mother's name was mispronounced in a demeaning fashion.

== Other works and appearances ==
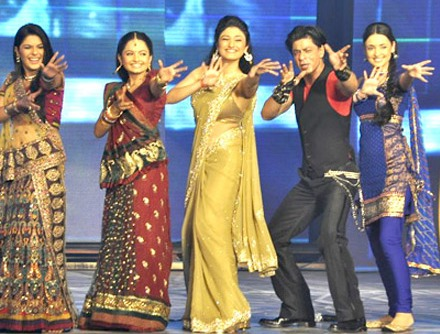
Khanna at the music launch of Ra.One (2011) along with Shah Rukh Khan, Pooja Gaur, Giaa Manek and Sanaya Irani

In 2010, Khanna hosted Diwali Dilo Ki, a Diwali celebration event by Star Plus. In 2011, she hosted the music launch of Ra.One, a Bollywood science-fiction starring Shah Rukh Khan and Kareena Kapoor. Khanna then hosted another instalment of Diwali celebration events by Star Plus for the year 2011. The event was titled Diwali Rishton Ki Mithas and Khanna hosted various segments of that event. She also appeared in the promotional video of Ruk Jana Nahi (another Star Plus serial) along with fellow Star Plus actresses Deepika Singh, Nia Sharma and Pooja Gaur.

=== Brand endorsements ===
Khanna is the brand ambassador of 'Beauty with Astrology' science organisation founded by her mother, Kamini Khanna. They have also launched an early morning spiritual and wellness radio show titled 'Seher' on 92.7 BIG FM with Khanna as the brand ambassador. In 2010, Khanna was roped in as judge in Frito-Lay India's consumer campaign titled "Kurkure Spend Time with Family".

Khanna has also walked the ramp at Lakme Fashion Week, IIJW and for various other designers. Khanna was also the brand ambassador of "Mix n Drink" campaign launched by Catch foods] in 2011. In 2013, Khanna featured in the "My Roohafza story" activation campaign launched by Hamdard division.

== Filmography ==
=== Films ===
Year	Title	Role	Notes	Ref.
2011	Teen Thay Bhai	Gurleen Kaur		
2013	Bhaji in Problem	Preet Cheema	Punjabi film	
2017	Gurgaon	Preet Singh		
2019	Posham Pa	Shikha Deshpande		
2020	Ghoomketu	Janki Devi		

=== Television ===
Year	Title	Role	Notes	Ref.
2008	Radhaa Ki Betiyaan Kuch Kar Dikhayengi	Ragini "Gini" Sharma		
2009	Bhaskar Bharti	Bharti		
2009	Dekh India Dekh	Contestant		
2010–2012	Sasural Genda Phool	Suhana Bajpai Kashyap		
2010	Big Money: Chota Parda Bada Game	Contestant		
2010	Meethi Choori No 1	Contestant		
2010–2011	Jhalak Dikhhla Jaa 4	Contestant	6th place	
2011	Jubilee Comedy Circus	Host		
2011	Star Ya Rocktar	Contestant		
2012	Kahani Comedy Circus Ki	Contestant		
2012	Jhalak Dikhhla Jaa 5	Host		
2013	Welcome - Baazi Mehmaan Nawaazi Ki	Contestant		
2013	India's Best Dramebaaz	Host		
2014	Comedy Nights with Kapil	Personality Development Teacher		
2014	Gangs of Haseepur	Host		
2014	Dil Hai Chota Sa Choti Si Asha	Host		
2016	Comedy Nights Live	Various Characters		
2016	Good Morning with Ragini Khanna	Host		

==== Special appearances ====
Year	Title	Role	Ref.
2008	Jasuben Jayantilaal Joshi Ki Joint Family	Ragini Sharma	
2009	10 Ka Dum 1	Herself	
2010	Kaun Banega Crorepati 4	Herself	
2010	Tujh Sang Preet Lagai Sajna	Suhana Bajpai Kashyap	
2010	Yeh Rishta Kya Kehlata Hai	Suhana Bajpai Kashyap	
2010	Comedy Ka Daily Soap	Suhana Bajpai Kashyap	
2010	Baat Hamari Pakki Hai	Suhana Bajpai Kashyap	
2010	Comedy Circus Ke SuperStars	Herself	
2010	Sapna Babul Ka...Bidaai	Suhana Bajpai Kashyap	
2011	Ek Hazaaron Mein Meri Behna Hai	Suhana Bajpai Kashyap	
2011	Saath Nibhaana Saathiya	Suhana Bajpai Kashyap	
2011	Ruk Jaana Nahin	Suhana Bajpai Kashyap	
2011	Comedy Circus Ka Naya Daur	Herself	
2011	Ratan Ka Rishta	Herself	
2012	Movers & Shakers Masala Markey	Herself	
2012	Main Lakshmi Tere Aangan Ki	Herself	
2013	Jhalak Dikhhla Jaa 6	Herself	
2013	Badalte Rishton Ki Dastaan	Herself	
2014	Diya Aur Baati Hum	Herself	
2017	Rasoi Ki Jung Mummyon Ke Sung	Herself	
2018	Entertainment Ki Raat	Herself	
2019	Kitchan Champion 5	Herself	
2021	Pandya Store	Suhana Bajpai Kashyap	
2021	Sasural Genda Phool 2	Suhana Bajpai Kashyap	

== Accolades ==
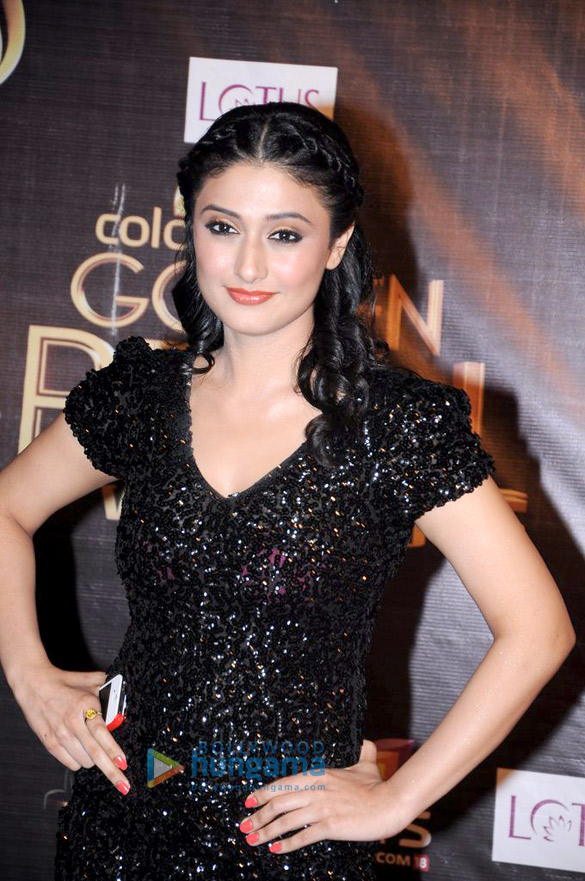
Khanna at Colors Golden Petal Awards, 2012

Year	Category	Show	Result
Apsara Film & Television Producers Guild Awards
2012	Apsara Award for Best Actress in a Drama Series	Sasural Genda Phool	Won (tied with Sakshi Tanwar)
Indian Television Academy Awards
2010	Best Actress - Drama (Popular)	Sasural Genda Phool	Nominated
2010	Best Actress - Drama (Jury)	Sasural Genda Phool	Nominated
2013	Best Anchor - Music & Film Based Show	India's Best Dramebaaz	Nominated
Indian Telly Awards
2010	Best Actress in a Lead Role	Sasural Genda Phool	Won
2012	Best Actress in a Lead Role (Jury)	Sasural Genda Phool	Nominated
Zee Gold Awards
2011	Best Actor - Female (Popular)	Sasural Genda Phool	Nominated
2011	Best Celebrity Jodi	Sasural Genda Phool	Nominated
