= Sasural Genda Phool 2 =

Indian television series

- Created by: Zama Habib
- Written by: Mitali Bhattacharya; Mausami Choudhary
- Directed by: Rakesh Kumar; Shiv Anand
- Opening theme: “Oye Hoye Hoye, Oye Hoye Hoye, Sasural Genda Phool”
- Country of origin: India
- Original language: Hindi
- No. of episodes: 94

Production
- Producers: Romit Ojha; Mitali Bhattacharya
- Running time: 21-23 minutes
- Production company: Ravi Ojha Productions Enterprises

Original release
- Network: Star Bharat
- Release: 7 December 2021 – 15 April 2022

Related
- Sasural Genda Phool

Sasural Genda Phool 2 is an Indian television action romance drama thriller series that aired on Star Bharat, starring Jay Soni and Shagun Sharma. It is a sequel of StarPlus's show, Sasural Genda Phool, which earlier starred Jay Soni and Ragini Khanna. It is digitally available on Disney+ Hotstar. The show premiered on 7 December 2021. The show went off air on 15 April 2022.

== Plot ==
The show takes place seven years after the events of Sasural Genda Phool, revolving around Ishaan who is now a widower as Suhana has died. Ishaan is living with Suhana's memories and does not wish to remarry as per the promise he made to her. The Kashyap family is worried for him and keeps insisting him to remarry, bringing new marriage proposals for Ishaan everyday which annoys him; Ishaan manages to reject them with excuses.

Soon, Ishaan crosses paths with Tanya aka Titlee, a street-smart thief and con-woman, who hates relationships and doesn't believe in love as her dreams were shattered by her drunkard father. Ishaan and Titlee make a deal: Titlee would pretend to be Ishaan's girlfriend in front of his family and purposefully create a bad impression on them, to make them quit the thought of getting Ishaan remarried; while Ishaan would pay her in return for her help. They execute their plan and successfully manage to turn everyone against Titlee. Ishaan thanks Titlee for her help and pays her as promised, parting ways with her. Titlee slowly realises that while pretending to have feelings for Ishaan, she has actually fallen in love with him.

Jagdish, Titlee's father, gets drunk and accidentally exposes Ishaan and Titlee's secret to the Kashyaps. Shocked, the Kashyaps try to make Ishaan confess this but fail. Meanwhile, Ishaan stands by Titlee's side in her personal battles and emotionally supports her. He falls in love with her but feels guilty for betraying Suhana. Unwilling to move on from Suhana, a scared Ishaan confesses the truth to his family that Titlee is not his girlfriend and that he was putting up an act in front of them. Titlee breaks into tears after overhearing Ishaan declaring to his family that he doesn't love her.

== Cast ==
=== Main ===
- Jay Soni as Ishaan Kashyap: Rano and Alok's son; Ishika's brother; Suhana's widower; Titli's husband (2021–2022)
- Shagun Sharma as Tanya "Titli" Awasthi: a thief and con-woman; Jagdish’s daughter; Ishaan's wife (2021–2022)

=== Recurring ===
- Supriya Pilgaonkar as Shailaja Kashyap – Ishwar's estranged wife; Inder and Panna's mother; Meethi's grandmother (2021–2022)
- Sooraj Thapar as Alok Kashyap – Gayatri and Ambarnath's younger son; Ishwar, Urmi and Radha's brother; Rano's husband; Ishaan and Ishika's father (2021–2022)
- Shruti Ulfat as Rano Kashyap – Alok's wife; Ishaan and Ishika's mother (2021–2022)
- Sudhir Pandey as Ambarnath Kashyap – Gayatri's husband; Ishwar, Alok, Urmi and Radha's father; Inder, Panna, Ishaan, Ishika, Deepak and Ilesh's grandfather (2021–2022)
- Anita Kanwal as Gayatri Kashyap – Ambarnath's wife; Ishwar, Alok, Urmi and Radha's mother; Inder, Panna, Ishaan, Ishika, Deepak and Ilesh's grandmother (2021–2022)
- Jiten Lalwani as Indrabhan "Inder" Kashyap – Shailaja and Ishwar's son; Panna's brother; Rajni's husband; Meethi's father (2021–2022)
- Richa Soni as Rajni Kashyap – Inder's wife; Meethi's mother (2021–2022)
- Rashmi Singh as Ishika Kashyap – Rano and Alok's daughter; Ishaan's sister (2021–2022)
- Shyam Mashalkar as Ilesh Bhardwaj – Urmi's son; Disha's husband (2021–2022)
- Ridheema Tiwari as Disha Bhardwaj – Ilesh's wife (2021–2022)
- Maira Dharti Mehra as Meethi Kashyap – Rajni and Inder's daughter (2021–2022)
- Ankit Sagar as Jagdish – A drunkard; Titli’s father. (2021–2022)
- Dalljiet Kaur as Dr. Avni Sehgal – Ishaan's friend (2021–2022)
- Ishaan Singh Manhas as Karan: Ishika's ex husband (2021)

=== Special appearances ===
- Ragini Khanna as Suhana Bajpai Kashyap – Ishaan's late wife (2021–2022)

== Production ==
=== Development ===
A puja was organised on the sets on October 26 post-which the shooting commenced for the show.

=== Casting ===
Almost all former cast-members from the first season were retained and talks were on with Ragini Khanna, who played the lead in the former season. However, Khanna refused returning as a lead-face on TV and hence she accepted to only play a cameo in the show as deceased Suhana.

New characters and entries too took place in the new season, like Dalljiet Kaur and few others.

=== Release ===
The first promo was released on 9 November 2021, featuring lead Jay Soni and Ragini Khanna.

The second promo was released on 24 November 2021, featuring the face-family, Jay Soni as Ishaan and lead Shagun Sharma as Titli.
