= Nitin Sahrawat =

Indian actor (born 1981)

- Born: 13 August 1981 (age 45); Dehradun, Uttar Pradesh (present–day Uttarakhand), India
- Occupations: Actor, lawyer, entrepreneur
- Years active: 2002–present
- Spouse: Vaishnavi Dhanraj (m. 2012; div. 2016)
- Website: bestindian.co.in

Nitin Sahrawat (born 13 August 1981), is an Indian film-television actor, lawyer, and entrepreneur. He is the founder of the Ayurvedic cosmetics and perfumery company BestIndian Luxuries, under which he has created and trademarked several brands including Moviestar, Elixir of Youth, and GlowPotion. Sahrawat is also known for his environmental work, including the creation of the Atal Vatika urban forest, as well as his extensive career in television commercials and series.

== Early life and education ==
Sahrawat was born in Dehradun to a family of academicians; his mother was a professor and his father an attorney. He attended Brightlands School and St. Joseph's Academy, Dehradun. He initially pursued a degree in Mechanical Engineering at Bapuji Institute of Engineering & Technology in Karnataka before leaving to begin a career in modeling and acting in Mumbai.

In his late thirties, after stepping away from his acting career, Sahrawat returned to academia. He completed a three-year Bachelor of Arts degree with high distinction, earning a score that placed him on the first merit list for the LLB program at D.A.V. Post Graduate College, Dehradun. He continued his studies to become a registered lawyer in his forties while simultaneously building his company.

== Career ==
=== Modelling ===
Nitin started his modelling career in 2002 with a print campaign for Standard Chartered and in the following years he went on to become one of the most visible faces on Indian television, with TV commercials for brands including Tide, Pillsbury Company, Maruti 800, Hyundai Santro, LG Electronics, Hero MotoCorp, Ariel, Tropicana Products and Sunsilk. As a result of Indian economy opening up in 1990s (1990s in India) international brands started devising strategies of entering the lucrative Indian market. Nitin Sahrawat was the face of many such launches in India, including his commercial for Pedigree Petfoods, Nokia N72 and Tetley.

In 2004 Samsung rolled out a big budget campaign to commemorate Indian cricket team's tour of Pakistan, which was one of the biggest sporting event of the Indian subcontinent as the two nations had resumed sporting ties after a long gap. Sahrawat acted in this campaign which was named "Jeet Lo Dil" (Win Hearts). As a result of this campaign he became popular in Pakistan too, and in spite of Pakistan Government's official ban on using Indian actors for Pakistani ad campaigns, he later went on to act in numerous Pakistani TV commercials.

His TV commercial for Indian Oil Corporation won the IDPA (Indian Documentary Producers' Association) and RAPA (Radio & TV Advertising Practitioners Association of India) Awards in 2005. In 2010 Cannes Lions winner director duo Nic Osborne and Sune Maroni directed a Fiat Punto TV commercial starring Nitin Sahrawat which went on to win numerous awards including Creative ABBY 2011 and Adfest 2011. Other acclaimed directors who have often worked with Sahrawat include Pradeep Sarkar, Shantanu Bagchi, Oni Sen, Arjun Mukherjee, Manav Menon, Aniket Shirke, Prahlad Kakkar, Ram Madhvani, Abhinay Deo, V. K. Prakash, E. Nivas, Pankaj Parashar and Abhijit Chaudhuri (Dadu).

=== Acting ===
In 2010, Sahrawat acted in Rann, which was directed by Ram Gopal Varma and co starred Amitabh Bachchan. After his two-movie contract with Sarvodaya Visuals got delayed, Sahrawat accepted Balaji Telefilms's offer for season two of their popular show Kitani Mohabbat Hai. He enacted the character of Rajveer Singh Ahluwalia, a stoic police officer which was quite different from the amiable characters that he had usually portrayed in his TV commercials. Kitani Mohabbat Hai Season 2 ended in May 2011 with Rajveer getting shot while trying to save Arohi.

In the first half of 2013 Nitin Sahrawat was seen in two other Balaji Telefilms shows, namely Savdhaan India and Parichay. In Parichay he played the role of a fictitious Bollywood superstar called Aman Kumar which was inspired by real life Bollywood superstar Salman Khan. In the show Aman Kumar hires Kunal (played by Samir Soni ) to defend him in a DUI & Hit and run case which was based on Salman Khan's 2002 Bandra incident.

In the latter half of 2013 Sahrawat signed up for the award-winning show Bade Achhe Lagte Hain as the antagonist against the character of Ram Kapoor (played by Ram Kapoor). In February 2014 Sahrawat started shooting for Star Plus's new show Ishq Kills which is directed by Vikram Bhatt. In the latter half of the year Sahrawat started shooting for Saurabh Tewari's new show called Do Deewane Ek Shehar Me, but this show was scrapped by the channel before its telecast.

In 2015 Sahrawat was signed up for two shows of 4 Lions Films, namely Qubool Hai and Adhuri Kahaani Hamari (TV series). In Qubool Hai he portrayed the part of Bollywood superstar Anand Kumar while in Adhuri Kahaani Hamari (TV series) he was seen as Chote Raja Lakshman Dev and was paired opposite Shubhangi Atre Poorey. In September Sahrawat was seen in a special episode of Code Red, in which he played the character of a psychopathic killer. This episode was based on truck driver M. Jaishankar and his killing spree in southern India.

=== Entrepreneurship and Intellectual Property ===
Sahrawat is the founder of BestIndian Luxuries, a company that develops and markets natural cosmetics and alcohol-free perfumes. He has created several brands under this umbrella, including Moviestar, ElixirOfYouth, GlowPotion, Luxury Of India, and QuiteLit. The company's philosophy is centered on merging traditional Indian Ayurvedic knowledge with modern dermal science. As a specialist in intellectual property, Sahrawat has personally filed and secured over 35 trademarks for his brands.

The company operates on a Social enterprise model, with a pledge to utilize 25% of all revenue for social and ecological causes, including animal welfare, environmental restoration, and youth employment initiatives.

== Personal life ==
Nitin Sahrawat was married to Indian television actress Vaishnavi Dhanraj. The two first met on the set of Nitin's show Kitani Mohabbat Hai Season 2. After a courtship of two years Nitin and Vaishnavi got married in Shantikunj, Haridwar according to Vedic Rituals on 23 December 2012. The reception in Mumbai was attended by their co actors including Meghna Malik, Kritika Kamra, Karan Kundra, Simran Kaur, Sadiya Siddiqui, Dayanand Shetty, Khalid Siddiqui and Hrishikesh Pandey. The two stayed in Mumbai with their Labrador Retriever named Thor.

In March 2014 Nitin and Vaishnavi were the guests for the launch episode of NDTV's The Getaway in which the two were given a Hyundai Elantra which they then drove down to Kamshet. The theme of the episode being adventure, the couple then paraglided off the challenging Shelar's site. This episode was shot at their Lokhandwala Complex home and also featured their pet.

Sahrawat and Dhanraj filed for legal separation in July 2015 and were divorced in January 2016, opting for a mutual and amicable divorce in Bandra family court. Incompatibility and emotional disconnect was cited as the reason for the end of the marriage. In December 2016, a celebrity gossip website alleged that even though the divorce was mutual, the reason for the end of the marriage was domestic violence. This version quickly went viral with mainstream news portals and publications quoting the gossip website article. None of these news articles included any quote from Sahrawat, a fact that he lamented in a social media post. This Facebook post was later published by some media outlets as a form of an apology for the unverified publications based on tabloid journalism.

Sahrawat has stated that his decision to become a lawyer was partly driven by the desire to be capable of fighting his own battles after facing damaging allegations following his divorce. He resides in Dehradun where his home serves as a sanctuary for his rescue dogs.

== Social causes ==
Sahrawat's social work focuses on environmentalism and animal welfare. He founded Atal Vatika, an urban forest in Dehradun, by planting and nurturing hundreds of native and Ayurvedic trees on a formerly barren plot of land, successfully restoring biodiversity to the area.

He is extensively involved in animal rescue. He has organized the sterilization and vaccination of approximately 50 stray dogs. His home is a sanctuary for five dogs he has personally rescued from the streets. He has also supported the Patriot Dogs campaign, which works to rehabilitate retired service dogs from the Indian Army and police forces. Over the years Sahrawat has collaborated with the government in the form of his Public Service Films and TV commercials. These include causes like Family Planning in India, Public Safety and World Heart Federation.

=== Atal Indian ===
Sahrawat has conceived and implemented the Atal Indian Project, which aims at creating multiple nature reserves or urban forests called Atal Vatikas, in Indian cities. Color coordinated avenue tree plantation in the urban centers of India, is another stated mission of the project. In August 2018, the capital of the Indian state of Uttarakhand became the first city to support the Atal Indian project.

Atal Indian is a social movement, focused on providing practical solutions to the challenges faced by the rapidly urbanizing India. It is dedicated to the 10th Prime Minister of India Atal Bihari Vajpayee according to its mission statement. Atal Indian's primary activities include ecocentric projects like Atal Vatika, aimed at betterment of the quality of life of the Indian citizens, in sync with the available natural resources around them.

The movement strives for the creation of 'Green' smart cities, modifying existing Indian population centers with nature as the core and the unifying essence. A sustainable city which is in sync with its natural resources, provides a foundation for sustainable growth of its denizens.

==== History ====
Atal Indian was conceived by Nitin Sahrawat in 2016. In 2016, Sahrawat started a pilot project to create an urban forest, and Avenue (landscape) tree plantation in Dehradun, when he personally dug out fifty pits, and planted Gulmohar and Saraca asoca trees, protecting them with tree guards which had been granted by the city council. In two years time, this pilot project proved to be successful enough for Sahrawat to decide on replicating this project in other Indian cities. He has collaborated with the administration of the Indian state of Uttarakhand, and has pledged his support for the Rispana Rejuvenation project of the Chief Minister Trivendra Singh Rawat.

==== Projects ====
Atal Urban Rejuvenation Project aims at inculcating landscape architecture at the local resident welfare association level in the cities and villages of India, through the participation of the local population. It aims at better coordination between the RWAs and the administrative bodies, for providing a uniform look to the entire city, brought about by colour coordinated Avenue tree plantation drives, covering the entire city.

An integral part of this project is the waterfront development of the Urban riverside, and creation of greenways. Nature can be used to provide important services for communities by protecting them against flooding or excessive heat, or helping to improve air, soil and water quality. More green space around one's house is associated with better mental health. Also, an availability of green space in neighbourhoods helps the senior citizen segment of the population by encouraging increased physical activity, which results in healthier and longer lifespans.

== Advertising campaigns ==
| Year | Brand | Medium | Production House | Language | Notes |
|---|---|---|---|---|---|
| 2002 | Standard Chartered | Print | | English | |
| 2002 | State Bank of India | TV Commercial | Whodunit Films | Hindi | |
| 2003 | Merrill Lynch | Print & Outdoor | | English | |
| 2003 | Hindustan Petroleum | Print | | English | |
| 2003 | Tetley | TV Commercial | Reel Company | Bengali | Bangladeshi TV Commercial |
| 2003 | Goli ke Hamjoli | TV Commercial | Black Magic | Hindi | |
| 2003 | Shanti Hair Oil | TV Commercial | Trends Ad Films | Hindi | Director: V. K. Prakash |
| 2003 | Pedigree Petfoods | TV Commercial | Classic Films | English | Director: Minto Singh |
| 2003 | BSL suitings | TV Commercial | Reel Company | English | |
| 2003 | Kotak Mahindra Bank | Print | | English | |
| 2004 | Wipro Santoor Cream | TV Commercial | Nebula Films | Hindi | |
| 2004 | Indian Oil Corporation | TV Commercial | Ramesh Deo Productions | Hindi | Director: Abhinay Deo |
| 2004 | Citibank | Print | | English | |
| 2004 | Samsung AC | TV Commercial & Print | Equas | English | |
| 2004 | Tide (brand) | TV Commercial | Ramesh Deo Productions | Hindi | |
| 2004 | Kenstar | TV Commercial | Red Ice | English | Director: E. Nivas |
| 2004 | Sunsilk | TV Commercial | Equinox | Hindi | Director: Ram Madhvani |
| 2004 | TVS Motor Company | TV Commercial | Whodunit Films | Hindi | |
| 2004 | Veedol | TV Commercial | Maaza Films | Hindi | Director: Pankaj Parashar |
| 2004 | J.M.Mutual Fund | TV Commercial | Ajay Bahl Productions | Hindi | Director: Ajay Bahl |
| 2004 | ICICI Bank | Print | | English | |
| 2004 | Thomas Cook Group | Print | | English | |
| 2004 | Tata Marina | Print | | English | |
| 2005 | Maruti 800 | TV Commercial | Looking Glass | Hindi | |
| 2005 | McDowell's No.1 | TV Commercial | Black Magic Films | Hindi | Director: Abhijit Chaudhuri |
| 2005 | Nestlé | TV Commercial | Genesis Films | Urdu | Director: Prahlad Kakkar Pakistani TV Commercial |
| 2005 | LG Electronics TV | TV Commercial | MAD Films | English | |
| 2005 | Eureka Forbes | TV Commercial | Illusion Films | Hindi | |
| 2005 | Hero MotoCorp CD Deluxe | TV Commercial | Foot Candles Films | Hindi | Director: Manav Menon |
| 2005 | Ring Guard | TV Commercial | Illusion Films | Hindi | |
| 2005 | Odonil | TV Commercial | Working I | Hindi | |
| 2005 | Ariel (detergent) | TV Commercial | Saatchi & Saatchi | Hindi | |
| 2005 | Tide (brand) | TV Commercial | Code Red Films | Hindi | |
| 2005 | Hindustan Petroleum | TV Commercial | Cine Assist | English | |
| 2005 | ICICI Prudential | TV Commercial | Red Ice Films | Hindi | |
| 2005 | Shakthi Masala | TV Commercial & Print | TWC Films | Tamil | Director: B Babushankar |
| 2005 | Afterbath Freshness Cream | TV Commercial | Illusion Films | Hindi | |
| 2005 | Life Insurance Corporation of India | Print | | English | |
| 2006 | Nokia N72 | TV Commercial | One Films | Hindi, English | |
| 2006 | Tata Group Credit Card | Print | | English | |
| 2006 | Vinay Corp | Print | | English | |
| 2006 | Life Insurance Corporation of India Housing Loan | Print | | English | |
| 2007 | Bank of Maharashtra | TV Commercial & Print | K film Company | Hindi | Director: Arjun Mukherjee |
| 2007 | Future Bazar | TV Commercial | R.M. Creations | Hindi | |
| 2007 | World Heart Day Saffola | TV Commercial | Rising Sun | English | Director: Aniket Shirke |
| 2007 | Borosoft | TV Commercial | Rising Sun | Hindi | Director: Aniket Shirke |
| 2007 | Vivel | TV Commercial | Footcandle Films | Hindi | Director: Manav Menon |
| 2007 | Pidilite Rangeela | TV Commercial | Monkey Business | Hindi | |
| 2007 | VGN Developers | Print | | English | |
| 2007 | Organon International | Print | | English | |
| 2007 | Fidelity Investments | Print | | English | |
| 2007 | Reliance Industries | Print | | Hindi | |
| 2007 | Britannia Industries Good Day | Print | | English | |
| 2007 | Emmay HR | Print | | English | |
| 2007 | Pepsodent | Print | | English | |
| 2007 | Unit Trust of India | Print | | English | |
| 2007 | Brooke Bond Red Label | Print | | English | |
| 2008 | Built Matrix | TV Commercial | CNBC | Hindi | |
| 2008 | Tropicana Products | TV Commercial | Illusion | English | Director: Shantanu Bagchi |
| 2008 | Pillsbury Company | TV Commercial | Cine Assist | Hindi | Director: Arjun Mukherjee |
| 2008 | Disney | TV Commercial | Thumb Nail Films | English | |
| 2008 | Radio City F.M | Print | | English | |
| 2008 | Benign | Print | | English | |
| 2008 | Dainik Bhaskar | Print | | English | |
| 2009 | LG Electronics AC | TV Commercial | Ramesh Deo Productions | Hindi | |
| 2009 | Hyundai Motor Company Santro Xing | TV Commercial | Illusion | English | Director: Oni Sen |
| 2009 | Dabur Honitus | TV Commercial | Ravi Deshpande Films | Hindi | |
| 2009 | HSBC | Print | | English | |
| 2009 | Dabur Pudin Hara | Print | | English | |
| 2010 | Fiat Punto | TV Commercial | Bang Bang films | Hindi | Director: Nic Osborne and Sune Maroni |
| 2010 | Crompton Greaves | TV Commercial | R.M Creations | Hindi | |
| 2010 | IMN | TV Commercial | | English | |
| 2010 | Telenor | TV Commercial | Haris Qadeer | Urdu | Director: Ahsan Rahim. Pakistani TV Commercial |
| 2011 | Nestle Milkpak | TV Commercial | Haris Qadeer | Urdu | Pakistani TV Commercial |
| 2011 | Citibank Personal Loans | Print | | English | |
| 2011 | ICICI Bank Business Loans | Print | | English | |
| 2012 | Freedom 5 | TV Commercial | Illumination Films | Hindi | Director: Shantanu Bagchi Public Service |
| 2012 | Marico Saffola | TV Commercial | Apocalypso Filmworks | Hindi | Director: Pradeep Sarkar |
| 2012 | Ensure | TV Commercial | Milestone Films | English | |
| 2012 | Brite Maximum Power | TV Commercial | Haris Qadeer | Urdu | Director: Ahsan Rahim. Pakistani TV Commercial |
| 2012 | Zigo Mobile Phones | TV Commercial | Udara Palliyaguruge | Sinhale | Sri Lankan TV Commercial |
| 2013 | ITC Limited Sunfeast Yippee | TV Commercial | Apocalypso Filmworks | Hindi | Director: Pradeep Sarkar |
| 2013 | Dhatri Hair Oil | TV Commercial | Lights On | Hindi | Director: Jismon Joy |
| 2013 | India Infoline | TV Commercial | Opticus Films | Hindi | |
| 2014 | Bayer | TV Commercial | Dreamcatchers | Hindi | |
| | Cinthol | TV Commercial | MAD films | Hindi | Director: Francois Merlet |
| | Muthoot Finance | TVC & Print | Apocalypso Filmworks | | Director: Pradeep Sarkar |

== Television ==
| Year | Show | Role |
|---|---|---|
| 2010 | Kitani Mohabbat Hai Season 2 | Rajveer Singh Ahluwalia |
| 2013 | Parichay — Nayee Zindagi Kay Sapno Ka | Superstar Aman Kumar |
| 2013–2015 | Savdhaan India | Pawan |
| 2013–2015 | Savdhaan India | Suresh |
| 2013-2014 | Bade Achhe Lagte Hain | Rajeev |
| 2014 | Ishq Kills | Avishek |
| 2015 | Code Red | Amar |
| 2015 | Code Red | Jaishankar |
| 2015 | Qubool Hai | Anand Kumar/Naseer Khan |
| 2015 | Adhuri Kahaani Hamari | Laxman Dev |

== Films ==
| Year | Film | Role | Notes |
|---|---|---|---|
| 2010 | Rann | Journalist Sahrawat | |
