= Saanvie Tallwar =

Indian actress

- Born: Saanvi Talwar
- Occupations: Actress; writer
- Years active: 2012–present
- Known for: O Gujariya: Badlein Chal Duniya; Yeh Kahan Aa Gaye Hum; Chandra Nandini

Saanvie Tallwar is an Indian actress who mainly works in Hindi television. She made her acting debut in 2012 with Arjun, portraying Neha Joseph. She is best known for her portrayal of Natasha in O Gujariya, Maanvi Chatterjee Sabharwal in Yeh Kahan Aa Gaye Hum and Durdhara in Chandra Nandini. She trained in theatre at the Stella Adler Studio of Acting in the United States.

Tallwar made her film debut with the Hindi-language film Gabbar Is Back, in 2015.

== Career ==
=== Debut and success (2012–2017) ===
Tallwar started her career as a writer and has written many episodes for the television series Fear Files: Darr Ki Sacchi Tasvirein, CID and SuperCops Vs SuperVillains.

She started her acting career in 2012 as she played Nia in episode 34 of the Star Plus series Arjun. In 2014, she portrayed the role of Natasha in Channel V's O Gujariya: Badlein Chal Duniya. In 2015, she appeared as Nazia Raza Ibrahim in Zee TV's Qubool Hai.

Tallwar achieved limelight when she played the role of Manvi Chatterjee in And TV's Yeh Kahan Aa Gaye Hum from 2015 to 2016. Next, she signed to play Chandragupta Maurya's wife Durdhara in Star Plus series Chandra Nandini in 2016.

=== Recent work (2018–present) ===
In 2018 she was seen in a cameo in Vikram Betaal Ki Rahasya Gatha. A year later, Tallwar played Rupali, an antagonist in Star Bharat's Sufiyana Pyaar Mera.

Tallwar has been featured in many episodic stories as a main protagonist like CID, Crime Patrol, Savdhaan India, Aahat, Fear Files: Darr Ki Sacchi Tasvirein, Adaalat, Love On The Run, Haunted Nights, Ishq Kills, Zindagi Ke Crossroads and SuperCops Vs SuperVillains .

== Filmography ==
=== Films ===
| Year | Title | Role | Notes | Ref |
|---|---|---|---|---|
| 2015 | Gabbar Is Back | Reporter | | |
| 2021 | Always on My Mind | Saanvie | Short music film | |

Web series

| Year | Title | Role | Notes | Ref. |
|---|---|---|---|---|
| 2026 | Khamosh Aahatein | Ria | lead role | |

=== Television ===
| Year | Title | Role | Notes | Ref. |
|---|---|---|---|---|
| 2012 | Arjun | Neha Joseph | Episode 34 | |
| 2013 | Crime Patrol | Ranjana | Episode 302 | |
| 2014 | Ishq Kills | Mandakini | Episode 9 | |
| 2014 | O Gujariya | Natasha | | |
| 2015 | Qubool Hai | Nazia Raza Ibrahim | | |
| 2015 | Haunted Nights | Sanju, Aarti | | |
| 2016 | Twist Wala Love | Amaya Sinha | Season 2, Episode 26-30 | |
| 2017 | Love On The Run | Mukti | Season 1, Episode7 | |
| 2017 | Savdhaan India | Bhavna | Episode 32 | |
| 2018 | Vikram Betaal Ki Rahasya Gatha | Iravati | Episode 17-19 | |
| 2019 | Sufiyana Pyaar Mera | Rupali Prajapati Sharma | | |
| 2023 | Ali Baba – Ek Andaaz Andekha Chapter 2 | Humaira | Season 2 | |
| 2024 | Shiv Shakti – Tap Tyaag Tandav | Vrinda | | |
| 2025 | Operation Chinar | Meera | Microdrama | Kuku Tv |
| 2026 | Badle Ka Game | Neha | Microdrama | Story Tv |
