= Ayaz Ahmed =

Indian television actor (born 1986)

- Born: 24 September 1986 (age 39); Howrah, West Bengal, India
- Occupation: Actor
- Years active: 2007–present

Ayaz Ahmed (born 24 September 1986) is an Indian television actor. He made his debut on television as a contestant in the popular reality show MTV Roadies. He is most known for his role in Ishaan: Sapno Ko Awaaz De, Kaisi Yeh Yaariaan and Do Dil Ek Jaan.

== Early life and education ==
Ahmed was born on 24 September 1986 and brought up in Howrah, West Bengal, India. He studied at St. Thomas' Church School, and studied law at Calcutta University, following in his father's footsteps.

== Career ==
Ahmed made his debut as a contestant in the popular reality show MTV Roadies 5. After his stint in Roadies, he played a small role in Kitani Mohabbat Hai. He later appeared in a number of shows such as Tujh Sang Preet Lagai Sajna, Ishaan: Sapno Ko Awaaz De, Meri Toh Lag Gayi... Naukri, I Luv My India, Parvarrish - Kuchh Khattee Kuchh Meethi, Do Dil Ek Jaan, Ishq Kills, MTV Webbed, Kaisi Yeh Yaariaan, Santoshi Maa and Agniphera.

== Television ==
Year	Serial	Role	Notes
2007	MTV Roadies 5	Contestant	Debut
2009	Kitani Mohabbat Hai	Abhay	
2010	Tujh Sang Preet Lagai Sajna	Bunty	
2010–2011	Ishaan: Sapno Ko Awaaz De	Pulkit	Parallel Lead Role
2011	Meri Toh Lag Gayi... Naukri	Ayaan Walia	
2012	I Luv My India	Prem Sethi	Lead Role
2012	Gumrah: End of Innocence		Episodic Role
2012	Parvarrish – Kuchh Khattee Kuchh Meethi	Aarav	
2013	Crime Patrol	Inspector Badri	Episodic Role
2013	Do Dil Ek Jaan	Raghunath Nayak	Lead Role
2014	Yeh Hai Aashiqui	Kanishk	Episodic Role
2014	Ishq Kills	Prashant	Episodic Role
2014	MTV Webbed 2	Raghav	
2014	MTV Splitsvilla 7	Contestant	
2014	MTV Fannah	Ranbir Dhawan	
2014–2015	Pyaar Tune Kya Kiya	Sid	Episodic Role
2014–2015	Pyaar Tune Kya Kiya	Anand	Episodic Role
2014–2015	Kaisi Yeh Yaariaan	Cabir Dhawan	Lead Role
2015	Code Red	Chales Gajrar	Episodic Role
2015–2017	Santoshi Maa	Dhairya Mishra	Lead Role
2017–2018	Agnifera	Baiju Kanpuria	Parallel Lead Role
2019	Laal Ishq	Sameer "Sam"	Episodic Role
2019	Shakti – Astitva Ke Ehsaas Ki	Arjun	Negative Role
2021	Aye Mere Humsafar	Dr. Sahil	Negative Role
2021	Aapki Nazron Ne Samjha	Aman	Negative Role
2021	Qurbaan Hua	Zain Siddiqui	Negative Role
2022	Fanaa: Ishq Mein Marjawan	Yug Raichand	Negative Role
2022–2023	Janam Janam Ka Saath	Nishant Tomar	Negative Role
2024	Mehndi Wala Ghar	Manas Agarwal	Negative Role

== Web series ==
Year	Series	OTT	Character
2020	Lips Don't Lie	Gemplex	
