= Deepak Wadhwa =

Indian television and Film actor (born 1987)

- Born: 26 October 1987 (age 38); India
- Occupation: Actor
- Years active: 2010-present
- Known for: Qubool Hai, Tamanna, Calendar Girls
- Spouse: Sayantani Bhaumik

Deepak Wadhwa (born 26 October 1987) is an Indian actor. He has performed many roles in various Hindi television shows, like Dhoondh Legi Manzil Humein, Kaali- Ek Punar Avtaar, Ishq Kills, Qubool Hai, Tamanna, Code Red and Haasil. As of July 2017, he has done his most recent role in Yeh Hai Mohabbatein. He has also appeared in a cameo in Calendar Girls. He is known for playing lead role of Sanjay in Star Plus sports-drama Meri Tamanna and Rahaat in Zee TV's Qubool Hai.

== Television ==
- STAR Plus' Yeh Hai Mohabbatein as Gaurav Bajaj
- STAR One's Dhoondh Legi Manzil Humein
- STAR Plus's Ishq Kills & Kaali – Ek Punar Avatar
- STAR Plus' Teri Meri Love Stories as Sunil Gupta
- Zee TV's Qubool Hai as Major Rahat Ansari
- Colors TV's Code Red
- Sony TV's Aahat (season 6)
- Sony TV's Haasil as David
- Zing's Pyaar Tune Kya Kiya (season 5) as Deepak
- Star Plus's Tamanna as Sanjay Pratap Singh
- &tv's Gangaa as Rudra
- MTV's Webbed
- Colors TV's Naagin 3 as Mohit Sippi
- Sony TV's Vighnaharta Ganesh as Raktabeej
- Sony TV's Kuch Rang Pyar Ke Aise Bhi as Jatin

=== Film ===
- Calendar Girls as Inzamam
