= Nisha Nagpal =

Indian television actress

- Occupation: Actor
- Years active: 2013–present
- Known for: Qubool Hai; Yeh Rishta Kya Kehlata Hai

Nisha Nagpal is an Indian television actress.

She shot to fame with her Indian television debut role of Tanveer Beg in Qubool Hai opposite Karan Singh Grover but later she was replaced by Amrapali Gupta due to her health issues. In 2014, she bagged her first lead role of Chandni in the show Masakali.

Apart from this Nagpal was also seen in shows like Yeh Hai Aashiqui, Punar Vivah - Ek Nayi Umeed, Lajwanti, Nisha Aur Uske Cousins, Begusarai and Adhuri Kahaani Hamari.

In 2017 she played the role of Rashi in 4 Lions Films' web series Tanhaiyan.

== Filmography ==
=== Television ===
Year	Title	Role	Ref.
2013	Qubool Hai	Tanveer Baig	
2012	Arjun	Anjali Meman	
2013	Arjun	Kiran Joshi	
2013	Punar Vivah - Ek Nayi Umeed	Kajal Rohan Dubey	
2014	Masakali	Chandni	
2015	Nisha Aur Uske Cousins	Kaira	
2015–2016	Lajwanti	Gunwanti	
2016	Yeh Hai Aashiqui	Mahi	
2016	Adhuri Kahaani Hamari	Avni	
2016	Begusarai	Bhavna	
2017	Tanhaiyan	Rashi	
2017	Dil Boley Oberoi	Chandini	
2017	Fear Files		
2017	Devanshi	Menaka	
2018	Ishq Subhan Allah	Nilofer Ali	
2019–2020	Ram Siya Ke Luv Kush	Urmila	
2019–2020	RadhaKrishn	Saraswati	
2020	Devi Adi Parashakti	Saraswati	
2020	Nazar 2	Vishala	
2020	Naagin 4	Ghumri	
2020-2021	Dwarkadheesh Bhagwaan Shree Krishn - Sarvkala Sampann	Rajkumari Subhadra	
2021	Teri Laadli Main	Sakshi	
2021–2023	Yeh Rishta Kya Kehlata Hai	Shefali Parth Birla	
2021	Anupamaa	Shefali Parth Birla	
2021	Sindoor Ki Keemat	Sakshi	
2024	Vanshaj	Koyal Verma	
