= Kritika Kamra =

Indian actress (born 1988)

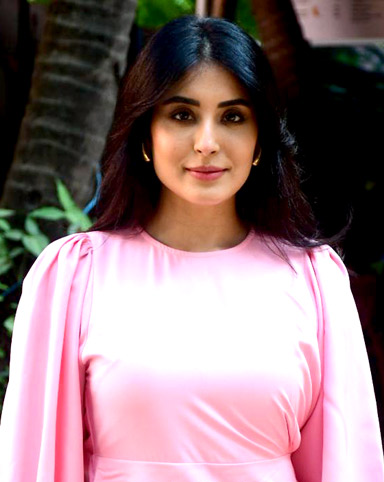
- Kamra in 2025
- Born: 25 October 1988 (age 38); Bareilly, Uttar Pradesh, India
- Occupation: Actress
- Years active: 2007–present
- Spouse: Gaurav Kapur (m. 2026)

Kritika Kamra (born 25 October 1988) is an Indian actress. She began her career in television, with the soap operas Kitani Mohabbat Hai (2009–2011), Kuch Toh Log Kahenge (2011–2013), and Reporters (2015). Kamra has also featured in Anubhav Sinha's film Bheed (2023), and the Amazon Prime Video series Tandav (2021) and Bambai Meri Jaan (2023).

== Early life ==
Kritika Kamra was born in Bareilly, Uttar Pradesh, into a Punjabi Hindu family of doctors and educators, with her father being a doctor and her mother a school principal in Sukhpur, near Ashoknagar, Madhya Pradesh. She attended various schools due to her family's relocations and completed her schooling at Delhi Public School, Vasant Kunj, in New Delhi. Kamra later enrolled at the National Institute of Fashion Technology (NIFT) in New Delhi to study Fashion Communication. During her time at NIFT, she was discovered by a casting director outside her college. This led to her first television role, which eventually brought her to Mumbai, where she began her acting career.

== Career ==
=== Debut and work in television (2007–2017) ===
Kamra made her acting debut in 2007, with Yahan Ke Hum Sikandar. In 2009, she played a singer, Arohi in Kitani Mohabbat Hai opposite Karan Kundra. The show was well received and earned her praises. From 2009 to 2010, she played Kajol / Prateeksha in Pyaar Ka Bandhan.

From 2010 to 2011, she reprised Arohi in Kitani Mohabbat Hai 2 opposite Karan Kundra. From 2011 to 2013, Kamra received praises for playing Dr. Nidhi Verma Mathur in Kuch Toh Log Kahenge, opposite Mohnish Bahl and Sharad Kelkar.

In 2015, Kamra played a reporter, Ananya Kashyap opposite Rajeev Khandelwal, in Reporters. In 2017, she played a princess Chandrakanta in Prem Ya Paheli – Chandrakanta, opposite Gaurav Khanna. Chandrakanta marks her final appearance in a fiction television show till date.

=== Career expansion (2018–present) ===
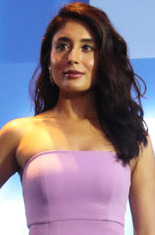
Kamra in 2022

Kamra made her film debut in 2018, with Mitron, playing Avni opposite Jackky Bhagnani. It became a commercial failure. In 2021, she played a college student Sana in the web series Tandav. Nairita Mukherjee of India Today stated, "Kritika's character populate the screen but fail to claw its way into the audience's mind."

In 2022, Kamra first played a princess Kamini in Kaun Banegi Shikharwati. Saibal Chatterjee noted, "Essaying the liveliest of the four roles, Kritika Kamra makes the strongest impression." Next, she played Dolly, a woman in a troubled marriage in Hush Hush. ThePrint's Tina Das was appreciative of her portrayal of a high society woman.

Kamra played a reporter Vidhi, in the 2023 film Bheed. Yatamanyu Narain of News18 found her to be "convincing". In the same year, she played Habiba (based on Haseena Parkar), in Bambai Meri Jaan. Anuj Kumar of The Hindu noted, "Cast against type, Kritika rises to the occasion as the girl who can shoot and slay with equal felicity."

Her most recent release, Gyaarah Gyaarah, released in 2024. She is currently filming Matka King, directed by Nagraj Manjule, where she stars opposite Vijay Varma.

== Personal life ==
Kamra is married to Gaurav Kapur.

== Filmography ==
=== Films ===
Year	Title	Role	Notes	Ref.
2015	Best Girlfriend	Sonali	Short film	
2015	Dry Dreams	Herself	Short film	
2016	White Shirt	Vani	Short film	
2018	Mitron	Avni Gandhi		
2023	Bheed	Vidhi Prabhakar		
2025	The Great Shamsuddin Family	Bani Ahmed	JioHotstar film	

=== Television ===
Year	Title	Role	Notes	Ref.
2007–2008	Yahan Ke Hum Sikandar	Arshiya		
2009	Kitani Mohabbat Hai	Arohi Sharma		
2009–2010	Pyaar Ka Bandhan	Kajol Das / Prateeksha		
2010	Zara Nachke Dikha 2	Contestant		
2010	Ganga Kii Dheej	Geeta		
2010–2011	Kitani Mohabbat Hai 2	Arohi Ahluwalia		
2011–2013	Kuch Toh Log Kahenge	Dr. Nidhi Verma		
2012–2013	V The Serial	Herself		
2013	Ek Thhi Naayka	Veera	Episodic role	
2014	Jhalak Dikhhla Jaa 7	Contestant	14th place	
2015	MTV Webbed 2	Host		
2015	Reporters	Ananya Kashyap		
2017	Prem Ya Paheli – Chandrakanta	Princess Chandrakanta / Maharani Chandrika		
2019	Khatra Khatra Khatra	Herself	Guest	

=== Streaming series ===
Year	Title	Role	Notes	Ref.
2016	Friend Zoned	Company Boss		
2016	I Don't Watch TV	Herself		
2021	Tandav	Sana Mir		
2022	Kaun Banegi Shikharwati	Kaamini Shikharwat		
2022	Hush Hush	Dolly Dalal		
2023	Bambai Meri Jaan	Habiba Kadri		
2024	Gyaarah Gyaarah	Vamika Rawat		
2025	Saare Jahan Se Accha	Fatima Khan		
2026	Matka King	Gulrukh		

=== Music videos ===
Year	Title	Singer	Ref.
2017	"Mera Jahan"	Gajendra Verma	
2019	"Hai Pyaar Kya"	Jubin Nautiyal	

== Awards and nominations ==
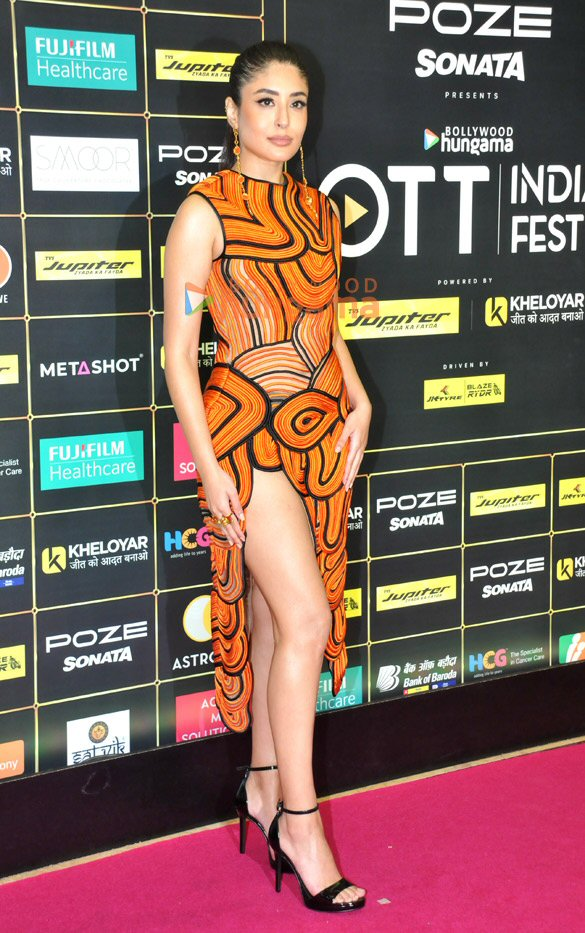
Kamra at the Bollywood Hungama OTT India Fest, in 2023

Year	Award	Category	Work	Result	Ref.
2009	New Talent Awards	Best Couple Award	Kitani Mohabbat Hai	Won	
2009	Indian Telly Awards	Fresh New Face - Female	Kitani Mohabbat Hai	Nominated	
2012	Indian Telly Awards	Best Actress in a Lead Role - Jury	Kuch Toh Log Kahenge	Nominated	
2017	Indian Telly Awards	Best Actress in a Lead Role	Prem Ya Paheli – Chandrakanta	Nominated	
2023	Bollywood Hungama OTT India Fest	Most Dazzling Performer - OTT	Bambai Meri Jaan	Won	
2024	Iconic Gold Awards	Best Supporting Actress - Web Series	Bambai Meri Jaan	Won	
