= Mahima Makwana =

Indian actress (born 1999)

- Born: 5 August 1999 (age 27); Mumbai, Maharashtra, India
- Education: Thakur College of Science and Commerce
- Occupation: Actress
- Years active: 2009–present

Mahima Makwana (born 5 August 1999) is an Indian actress who works in Hindi films and television. After entering television with Miley Jab Hum Tum and Balika Vadhu as a child artist, Makwana received recognition with her character Rachana in Sapne Suhane Ladakpan Ke, following which she went on to appear in several television shows. In 2021, Makwana made her Hindi film debut with the action thriller film Antim.

== Early life ==
Makwana was born and brought up in Mumbai. Her father was a construction worker who died when she was four months old. Makwana and her elder brother were raised by their mother, a former social worker. Makwana completed her schooling from Mary Immaculate Girls' High School. Makwana has a bachelor's degree in mass media.

== Career ==
=== Television (2009–2020) ===
Makwana started auditioning for acting parts at the age of 10, and appeared in a few Television advertisements. Her television debut was Mohe Rang De on Colors TV and she appeared in CID, Aahat, Miley Jab Hum Tum and Jhansi Ki Rani as a child artiste. In 2009 she played the role of young Gudiya/Gauri in the Colors TV show Balika Vadhu.

In 2011, Makwana was cast as the Parallel lead in Imagine TV's Sawaare Sabke Sapne... Preeto. Her first major lead role was in the Zee TV blockbuster soap opera Sapne Suhane Ladakpan Ke. Mahima said in an interview that reaching this point in her career was not easy and that she had participated in more than 500 auditions prior to Sapne Suhane Ladakpan Ke.

After Sapne Suhane Ladakpan Ke, In March 2015, Makawana played the role of Ram Kapoor and Gurdeep Kohli daughter in Dil Ki Baatein Dil Hi Jaane. After the end of Dil Ki Baatein Dil Hi Jaane in August, In November 2015, Makwana signed Adhuri Kahaani Hamari where she played the lead roles of Manasvini Choudhry, a Devrakshika and her reincarnation Radhika Khosla, a film-making student who learns about her previous birth life.

In 2015, Makwana appeared in an episodic role in Zing's youth show Pyaar Tune Kya Kiya as Mandira opposite Nikhil Chaddha.

In August 2017, Makwana played the lead Anami Baldev Singh in the Star Plus show Rishton Ka Chakravyuh.

In October 2018, Makwana entered as the female lead role of Mariam in Star Plus show Mariam Khan - Reporting Live post leap replacing Deshna Dugad. From December 2019 to November 2020, Makwana appeared as a protagonist Rani Dave Reshammiya in Colors TV's Shubharambh.

=== Films and web series (2017–present) ===
In 2017, Makwana made her film debut with Telugu Movie Venkatapuram. In 2019, Makwana appeared as Natasha in the short film titled Take 2. Take 2 was officially selected and premiered at the 10th Jagran Film Festival 2019, 10th Zumba film festival, and Asian Film Festival, Los Angeles, Hollywood. Take 2 won 'BEST FOREIGN FILM' at the Real-time film festival, Nigeria, 2020 and 'best festival themed film'. In 2019, Makwana made her digital debut with Rangbaaz Season 2 as Chiku. In 2020, Makwana appeared in a web show Flesh as Zoya. In 2021, Makwana was seen in a Tollywood-Hollywood flick Mosagallu which stars Kajal Agarwal, Vishnu Manchu and Suniel Shetty.

In December 2020, Makwana was cast as the female lead in the movie Antim: The Final Truth opposite Aayush Sharma. Antim: The Final Truth was released on 26 November 2021 and received mixed to positive reviews from critics. Bollywood Hungama wrote that she, "makes a confident debut and is memorable in the scene where she blasts Aayush." In 2023, Makwana played Devika, an urbane, social media manager in Nitesh Tiwari's Tumse Na Ho Payega. Grace Cyrill of India Today wrote, "Mahima Makwana's character has a very trendy job of as a social media manager for celebrities. The actress has done a great job with her performance." While Dhaval Roy of Times Of India wrote, she "effortlessly essays her character as a practical young woman who doesn't compromise on settling for a boyfriend who is not up to her standard, even if it means being in and out of relationships."

In 2024, Makwana played Mahika Nandy in the Dharma Productions series Showtime co-starring Naseeruddin Shah and Emran Hashmi. Mudit Bhatnagar of Times Now writes She "makes you root for her with her confident yet grounded performance." Similarly, Chirag Sehgal of News18 India says, she brings "simplicity to her character" and that her "performance looks very natural". Bollywood Hungama says, "Makwana creates a strong position for herself in the presence of the stalwarts and proves that she is the right fit for the role."

== Filmography ==
=== Films ===
Key
†	Denotes films that have not yet been released

- All films are in Hindi unless noted.

Year	Title	Role	Notes	Ref.
2017	Venkatapuram	Chaitra	Debut Telugu film	
2019	Take 2	Natasha	Short film	
2021	Mosagallu	Soha	Telugu film	
2021	Antim: The Final Truth	Mandana "Manda" Chawda	Debut Hindi film	
2023	Tumse Na Ho Payega	Devika		
TBA	Project Love †	TBA	Completed	

=== Television ===
Year	Title	Role	Notes	Ref.
2008–2009	Mohe Rang De	Unknown	Child actor	
2009	Balika Vadhu	Young Gauri Singh	Child actor	
2009	Miley Jab Hum Tum	Young Nupur Bhushan	Child actor	
2011–2012	Sawaare Sabke Sapne... Preeto	Sonam "Sonu" Dhillon		
2012	Aahat	Juhi Mehra		
2012	CID	Gopi Dhurvanshi		
2012–2015	Sapne Suhane Ladakpan Ke	Rachana Garg / Rachana Kabir Tripathi		
2014	Sapne Suhane Ladakpan Ke	Divya Omkar Luthra		
2014	Dance India Dance 4	Rachna Tripathi	Guest appearance	
2015	Dil Ki Baatein Dil Hi Jaane	Disha Ahuja		
2015	Code Red	Ria		
2015	Pyaar Tune Kya Kiya	Mandira		
2015–2016	Adhuri Kahaani Hamari	Manasvini Choudhry/Radhika Khosla		
2017–2018	Rishton Ka Chakravyuh	Anami Singh		
2018	Kumkum Bhagya	Herself	Guest appearance	
2018–2019	Mariam Khan – Reporting Live	Mariam Khan/Manjeet Kaur		
2019–2020	Shubharambh	Rani Reshammiya		

=== Web series ===
Year	Title	Role	Notes	Ref.
2019	Rangbaaz	Vaishali "Chiku" Singh	Season 2	
2020	Flesh	Zoya Gupta		
2024	Showtime	Mahika Nandy		
2026	Musafir Cafe	Preeti Kaushik		

=== Music video appearances ===
Year	Title	Singer(s)	Ref.
2019	"Dhadkanein Meri"	Asees Kaur, Yasser Desai	
2019	"Darwaze Band"	Harry, Enbee	
2020	"Oh Jaaniye"	Varun Dhone	
2020	"Teri Baat Aur Hai"	Stebin Ben	
2020	"Main Hoon Tera"	Piyush Shankar	
2021	"Toota Taara"	Stebin Ben	
2021	"Bas Ek Tera Main Hoke"	Stebin Ben	
2022	"High High"	Uchana Amit, King	

== See also ==
- List of Hindi television actresses
- List of Indian television actresses
