= St. Thomas' Church School, Howrah =

St. Thomas' Church School, Howrah Maidan
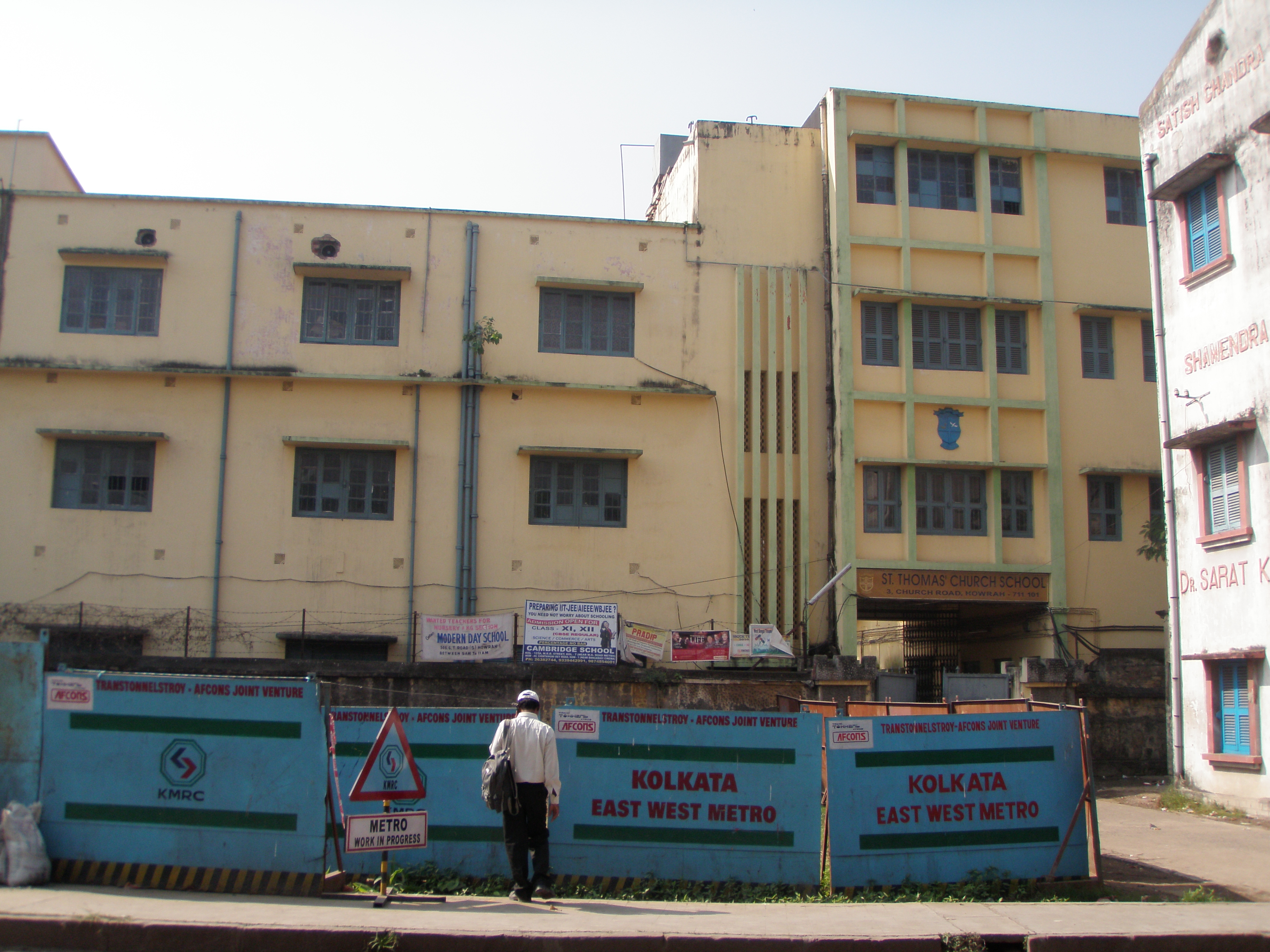
- St. Thomas' Church School in 2010

Location
- 3, Church Road; Howrah, West Bengal; India; 22.5841353°N 88.3349548°E

Information
- Motto: We Press towards the mark
- Religious affiliation: Diocese of Calcutta
- Established: 1860
- Founder: Rev. Dr. William Spencer
- Principal: Philip Christopher Daniels
- Classes offered: Lower Nursery to Class XII
- Language: English
- Hours in school day: 5 and a half hours
- Houses: Leason(Red), Spencer(Blue), Read(Green), Higgs(Gold)
- Song: With Ganges Gently Flowing
- Athletics: Soccer, Cricket, Basketball and Annual Athletics Meet, including events such as March-past, races & long jump among others
- Communities served: Nature Club, Debate Club, Photography Club & Sports Clubs among others.
- Affiliation: Council for the Indian School Certificate Examinations, New Delhi
- Website: www.stcsh1860.org

St. Thomas' Church School, Howrah Maidan founded between 1860 and 1865, by Rev. Dr. William Spencer, Chaplain of St. Thomas' Church, for education of Anglo-Indian children of Howrah, is one of the largest and most famous schools in Howrah, India. The school admits children of all sections of society irrespective of caste, creed or religion. It falls under the Diocese of Calcutta of the Church of North India.

== Subjects ==
After the eighth standard, there is a division in study stream with the choices being Commerce and Science. After tenth standard school offers three streams to students being science, commerce and humanities. Choices in science being science with biology or computer. There is also a division in Commerce and the choices are Applied Mathematics or Business studies.

== Facilities ==
The school contains a lush play ground and a basketball court. There is a church which is a central part of the school grounds.

== Notable alumni ==
- Cliff Richard - singer
- Ayaz Ahmed - actor
- Manoj Tiwari - Politician and former Indian National cricketer
