= O Gujariya: Badlein Chal Duniya =

- Genre: Drama
- Starring: See Below
- Country of origin: India
- Original language: Hindi

Production
- Production company: 4 Lion Films

Original release
- Network: Channel V India
- Release: 30 June – 3 October 2014

O Gujariya: Badlein Chal Duniya is an Indian television series which aired on Channel V India from 29 June 2014 through 3 Oct 2014. It is the eighth television series of 4 Lions Films. The show was directed towards the youth college life based in Jabalpur City. The show ends because of differences between the channel and the production house.

== Overview ==
Vaibhavi Singh is a spirited teenager who returns to her hometown Jabalpur to pursue her mission. Her life has two goals - one is to become an IAS officer and secondly to clear her father's name Anirudh Singh Chauhan who was labelled a traitor. Her father, an IAS officer was an honest man serving in the Indian Ammunition Factory of Jabalpur. He gets arrested and fails to prove his innocence. Unable to take the insult and pressure, he commits suicide in jail. His wife and a much younger Vaibhavi are subjected to torture and shame by Jabalpur people. The mother and daughter are forced to leave the city. It is revealed that Anirudh was framed by his own best friends who were corrupted and were involved in illegal activities.

Vaibhavi, now 18 years old comes back to Jabalpur to prove her father's innocence by becoming an IAS officer. Having witnessed atrocities by people at an early age, Vaibhavi has developed anger, hate and disgust for the society and turns out to be an angry young woman. Vaibhavi decides to take admission into the same college Harivansh Rai College where her father graduated. She finds an empty frame in the wall of fame board which once belonged to her father. Vaibhavi vows to avenge people that wronged her father and clear his name by any means necessary. On the first day of her college, Vaibhavi locks horns with Natahsa a daughter of a well known surgeon in Jabalpur and Ada Siddiqui the daughter of the well known industrialist. Natasha is bold, spirited and an open minded girl and Ada displays an attitude of an arrogant girl but she is soft from inside. Both of their fathers are best friends and happens to be trusties of college. Vaibhavi, Natasha and Ada collide on various occasions which makes them bitter towards each other.

Enter three young men into the story. Shaurya Scindia who is the president/head boy of the college who fights for the rights of students and also a bright student. He is known to be the perfect guy and the whole college is fond of him. He helps out every student and Vaibhavi becomes his center of attraction. He befriends her to solve her problems at various occasions and ultimately falls for her. He displays his feelings and affection for her at many levels but Vaibhavi is never sure whether she likes him or not. She remains confused about her feelings towards Shaurya but acknowledges him as his good friend. Kabir Scindia the younger brother of Shaurya is the complete opposite of him. He is a spoilt brat who doesn't believe in love and relationships. He is a Casanova who hooks up with various women until Natasha comes in his life and changes the picture. She brings a change in his life. Also she learns that Kabir has a past that brought a bitter change in his personality but Natasha changes him for good. Kabir is also friends with Ada, Vaibhavi and Samar and shares a bitter sweet bond with his brother Shaurya.

Meanwhile, Samar Khan is the friend of Junaid who is the fiancée of Ada and is about to marry her soon. As luck would have it, Samar studies in the same college where Ada does. Junaid lives in Karachi, Pakistan and he has asked Samar to keep an eye on Ada and ultimately takes care of her. Samar and Ada starts to develop feelings for her as Samar is genuinely good-hearted while Junaid is often rude and crude towards Ada. All three love stories blossom but they do not reach a conclusion. Natasha, Ada and Vaibhavi all become friends however, Vaibhavi is unaware of the fact that the men who wronged her father are no one else but fathers of Natasha and Ada.

Shaurya discovers the truth about Vaibhavi and tries to help her but she rejects his help. He proposes to her which she again rejects. Hurt by this, Shaurya eventually accepts an offer of Internship from Nasik and leaves the city heartbroken. Vaibhavi feels for Shaurya but decides to concentrate on her mission. To make things worse, Veer Pratap Singh a son of a well named Minister enters her life and the two lock horns with each other. Ada ultimately tells her family she does not want to marry Junaid. She also leaves the city and goes abroad and joins a home science course.

Vaibhavi's truth gets discovered by Professor Rao in the college and it is revealed that he, Natasha's father and Ada's father were responsible in framing Vaibhavi's father. Professor Rao feels guilty and decides to speak the truth but gets kidnapped by the goons sent by Siddiqui. Veer manages to rescue the Professor and he confesses his crime in the college. Natasha's father is arrested while Ada's father flees. Vaibhavi manages to clear out her father's name and an event is held in Harivansh Rai College for his honor.

The show ends with the teenagers standing in a line displaying emotions of courage, determination and valor.

== Cast ==
- Saanvi Talwar as Natasha Jaiswal
- Snehal Pandey/Swati Negi as Vaibhavi Singh Chauhan
- Neha Luthra as Ada
- Apoorv Singh as Shaurya Scindia
- Randeep Rai as Kabir Scindia
- Aakash Ahuja as Samar Khan
- Aayush Shah as Balli
- Kapil Verma as Junaid
- Rahul Tiwari as Anirudh Singh Chauhan (Vaibhavi's father)
- Sanjay Nath as Professor Rao
- Ankit Bhardwaj as Viren
- Shaleen Malhotra as Veer Partap Singh

== Trivia ==
- The show was initially named "O Womaniya". The title was changed thereafter to avoid copyright issues and thus became "O Gujariya"
- Character's names from the show were changed too. While the earlier names of the characters Vaibhavi, Natasha and Ada were Pooja, Sapna and Reshma, Apoorv's character was initially named Karan and Randeep's character was initially named Rahul. The creative decisions were later taken and their names changed to "Shaurya" and "Kabir" respectively.
- The show bore heavy inspiration from a TV show Left Right Left and Vaibhavi's character was based the familiar lines of Naina, where she portrays a strong willed, anti-social, aggressive and straightforward girl. And also having a similar mission to clear a family member's name from being a traitor. This character was played by actress Snehal Pandey. Later, due to storyline and casting changes, the character's sketch was changed to a far more sober and friendly girl. This version was portrayed by Swati Negi. The supporting characters had similar arcs related to the characters of that show.
- During its original run, the show could not achieve huge viewership unlike other Channel V shows. However, the show's sudden and abrupt ending evoked a lot of attention from the audiences and over the years, the show has turned into a cult classic.
