= Masakali (TV series) =

- Genre: Drama
- Developed by: Ashok Parmar
- Written by: Amitabh Singh Ramkshatra
- Directed by: Pratik Shah, Amitabh sinha
- Creative director: Dinesh Sudarshan Soi
- Starring: See below
- Theme music composer: Sunil Patni
- Opening theme: "Masakali" by Pamela Jain
- Country of origin: India
- Original language: Hindi
- No. of seasons: 1
- No. of episodes: 235

Production
- Executive producer: Sumit Sharma
- Producer: Mohammad Fasih
- Cinematography: V. Shoaib
- Editor: Asif Israr Khan
- Camera setup: Multi-camera
- Running time: Approx. 23 minutes
- Production company: Showman International

Original release
- Network: Sahara One
- Release: 17 January 2014 – 25 February 2015

Masakali is an Indian television drama series which premiered on Sahara One on 31 March 2014.

== Cast ==
- Vishal Ganatra as Vishal
- Nisha Nagpal as Chandani
- Zafar Ali as R.N. Goyal
- Madan Tyagi as Vinod Goyal
- Mugdha Shah as Bhua
- Sunil Malik as Nandu
- Bharati Sharma as Palki Sharma
- Rahila Rehman as Roshni
