= Sirf Ek Minute =

Interactive quiz show

- Genre: Game show
- Created by: Flipkart Video
- Starring: Shardul Pandit
- Country of origin: India
- Original language: Hindi
- No. of seasons: 1

Production
- Production company: Indian Storytellers

Original release
- Release: 14 July 2021

Sirf Ek Minute is a 2021 Indian Hindi-language interactive quiz show that debuted on the Flipkart app on 7 July 2021. It is an original series of Flipkart Video hosted by Indian television actor and singer Shardul Pandit and produced under the banner of Indian Storytellers. The show also allows viewers to be part of it by asking them 6 questions and the winners of each episode are awarded prizes by Flipkart.

== Overview ==
Sirf Ek Minute is a daily game show with each episode running under 2 minutes. It is created by Flipkart Video and being hosted by Shardul Pandit, who is popularly known for participating in the reality TV Show Big Boss 14. The show will check viewers’ knowledge about current affairs, sports, science, and geography. In every episode, the host will ask the audience six questions and two options will be given for each one. The viewers have to select the correct answer within 10 seconds.

== Cast ==
- Shardul Pandit

== Production ==
Flipkart Video announced the show by releasing a 32-second official teaser on its YouTube channel on 14 July 2021. This was followed by a motion poster which was unveiled on Twitter the following day.
