= Gungun Uprari =

Indian television actress

- Born: Lucknow, Uttar Pradesh, India
- Occupation: Actress
- Years active: 2008–present
- Known for: Bandhan Saat Janamon Ka; Gangaa
- Spouse: Vinod Uprari (m. 2003)
- Children: Pari Uprari (daughter)

Gungun Uprari is an Indian actress who appears in Hindi TV shows. Gungun Uprari is known for her roles in serials like Bandhan Saat Janamon Ka, Rakt Sambandh, Haar Jeet,Buddha and Jo Biwi Se Kare Pyaar.

== Early life ==
Gungun Uprari is from Lucknow, Uttar Pradesh. She has a degree in mass communication. Her father is a retired banker, and her mother is a housewife. Gungun Uprari has two sisters, and both are lecturers in a college. She has been married to Vinod Uprari since 7 July 2003 and has a ten-year-old daughter named Pari.

== Television ==
Year	Show	Role	Notes
2008–2009	Bandhan Saat Janamon Ka	Janvi Agarwal Gupta	Debut Series
2010	Keshav Pandit		Episodic role
2010–2011	Rakt Sambandh	Shreya Savratkar	
2011–2012	Haar Jeet	Salima Abdullah / Rehana Sultana	
2012–2013	Hongey Judaa Na Hum	Preeti Rajeev Mishra	
2013	Arjun	Sakshi Gupta (Episode 61)	Episodic role
2013	Jo Biwi Se Kare Pyaar	Naina Mohit Khanna	
2013–2014	Buddha	Mahapajapati Gotami	
2014	Devon Ke Dev...Mahadev	Maharani	Cameo Role
2015–2017	Gangaa	Madhavi Niranjan Chaturvedi	
2017	Prem Ya Paheli – Chandrakanta	Maharani Ratnagarbha	
2017–2019	Paramavatar Shri Krishna	Yashoda	
2021	Paapnaashini Ganga	Maharani Mainavati	
2022–2023	Rajjo	Manorama Dhaki	
2025	Manpasand Ki Shaadi	Anuradha Dewan	
2026–present	Queen	Gauri Singh Tomar	

=== Web series ===
Year	Title	Role	Platform	Notes
2020	The Casino	Roop Shailendra Singh Marwah	ZEE5	
