= Arjun (TV series) =

Indian television series (2012-2014)

- Logo
- Also known as: Har Yug Mein Aayega Ek - Arjun
- Genre: Action; Crime fiction; Police procedural; Drama; Thriller
- Written by: Gul Khan
- Directed by: Gorky Max
- Creative director: Nimisha Pandey
- Starring: See below
- Country of origin: India
- Original language: Hindi
- No. of seasons: 1
- No. of episodes: 145

Production
- Producer: 4Lions Films
- Production locations: Mumbai; Delhi; Jaipur; Goa
- Camera setup: Multi-camera
- Running time: 45 minutes
- Production company: AR Films

Original release
- Network: STAR Plus
- Release: 11 August 2012 – 23 February 2014

Arjun, also known as Har Yug Mein Aayega Ek – Arjun, is an Indian Hindi-language action crime television series which aired on Star Plus from 11 August 2012 through 23 February 2014 on Monday and Friday evenings. It is the fifth television series of 4 Lions Films.

== Overview ==
This series is about a rebellious cop, Arjun Rawte who has been transferred to the Emergency Task Force (ETF), with the hope of nabbing Sikandar. Arjun, a fun-loving and caring guy who changed completely after witnessing the brutal murder of his wife in front of him. This made him start living a reclusive life. Sikandar had murdered his beloved wife, Roshni on their Anniversary night. Being drugged and beaten by the former, Arjun could do nothing rather than witness her dying before his eyes. Since then for the past two years he is on the quest of bringing justice to his wife by finding her killer who the department refused to believe existed.

The ETF team initially included ETF Chief ACP Sameer Rathod, ACP Arjun Suryakant Rawte, 2nd in command, Riya Mukherjee, a research specialist, Shreekant Sen aka Shree, the technical expert and Commando Chandrakant Patil, fondly called Chotu. The show deals with crimes such as human trafficking, organ trade, kidnapping murder, and honour killing. The three juniors were scared of Arjun's anger and the rivalry of the two seniors but had immense respect for both of them.

ACP Sameer and Arjun were once best friends but now Sameer blames Arjun for Roshni's death who was a good friend of his. Both of them were at loggerheads with each other due to this incident and also their way of working since Sameer believed in teamwork and possesses good leadership qualities while on the other hand, Arjun is often seen putting his life at risk to solve cases. Though he may hate Arjun, Sameer's care for him is still evident.

Throughout the journey of solving cases, Arjun was annoyed by Riya's inability to shoot and considered her incompetent for ETF. He also tried to help her overcome the fear of shooting by putting himself in danger. Due to this, Riya respect him a lot. Riya is soon martyred when she swallows xora virus to save the entire city and that's when Arjun realizes her true potential. She is posthumously awarded for her bravery.

After her death, the team continues their journey of solving cases when they are joined by new members Ayesha, former undercover police officer, Sakshi, ex-crime journalist and Liza, forensic expert who was also Shree's classmate in college. Sakshi seem to have a crush on Arjun but Arjun never let anyone break the walls of his heart after Roshni died. Ayesha and Sameer seemed to be dating each other. Soon, Sameer and Shree are transferred.

Although Arjun appeared to be tough and rude to his team, but in his heart cared for them and considered them his family. He becomes close to them and realizes their importance in his life.

In one of the organ trading cases involving a minister, the ETF team is mislead into believing that Karan, a history sheeter who used to steal trucks is involved. Chotu, Liza, Aayesha and Sakshi are killed during this case and Arjun is held responsible for this tragedy. Taking the help of Karan, he proves himself innocent. Arjun is torn between right and wrong. Realising that the department failed to support him and his team, he resigns from his position marking the end of ETF.

His journey of providing justice to the innocent continues with Karan and Simran (an aspiring actress and Karan's friend) as a private investigator, while taking the help of Anjali, an 8 year old tech savvy kid. Apart from this, he also works as a physical education teacher at Anjali's school.

The series end with the reunion of Arjun and Sameer as the latter gets access to Sikander's information which he shares with Arjun. He realises that truth of Sikander's existence and forgives Arjun.

== Cast ==
Season 1

- Shaleen Malhotra as A.C.P. Arjun Suryakant Rawte IPS, Second in command, Roshni's husband and Sameer's former best friend
- Behzaad Khan as A.C.P. Sameer Dhamsingh Rathore IPS (ETF Chief), Roshni's college friend and Arjun's former best friend
- Sana Makbul as Riya Mukherjee former Statistical Analyst (deceased) [Episode 1–22]
- Siddharth Sen as Inspector Shreekant "Shree" Sen, Tech Expert
- Ketan Karande as Inspector Chandrakant "Chhotu" Patil, Commando (deceased)
- Shital Shah as Inspector Ayesha Kapoor / Drug Peddler Nadia (undercover; deceased)
- Ritu Chauhan as Dr Lisa D'Cruz (forensic expert, Shree's college friend; deceased)
- Mrunal Thakur as Sakshi Anand (crime journalist; deceased)
- Sameksha as Roshni Arjun Rawte (Arjun's wife, Sameer's college friend; deceased)
- Bikramjeet Kanwarpal as D.I.G Dustin Coelho
- Rajesh Kumar as Pathan Lala, Sheen's kidnapper involved in human trafficking case (episode 1 & episode 12)
- Mansi Srivastava as Payal Verma, Arvind's sister in law and killer, Shweta's sister(episode 5)
- Basant Bhatt as Varun, Kapil's best friend, 9th std student at JPG International School (episode 6)
- Harsh Khurana as Antiques Collector (episode 13/14)
- Aashish Kaul as Home Minister Mangesh Joshi, involved with Naxals (episode 16) / Dr Hariharan, serial killer(episode 119)
- Priya Ahuja Rajda as Journalist (episode 16)
- Karuna Verma as Dr Kamala, oncologist (episode 18)
- Loveleen Kaur Sasan as Shweta,a girl scared of ghosts (episode 19)
- Mita Vashisht as Sharda Devi, orphanage owner(episode 24)
- Ankur Nayyar as Chess Grandmaster Hiten Saxena, Sandhya's husband and killer (episode 25)
- Sunayana Fozdar as Sandhya Hiten Saxena, Hiten's wife(episode 25)
- Saanvi Talwar as Neha Joseph, Bala's forced girlfriend (episode 34)
- Vinita Mahesh as Anjali Yadav, Raja's girlfriend, killed by Bala (episode 34)
- Ojaswi Aroraa as Meera, dance reality show contestant (episode 42)
- Mansi Sharma as Shilpa Singh (episode 49)
- Bipasha Basu as Maya, for promotion of Aatma movie(episode 61)
- Gungun Uprari as Sakshi Gupta, domestic violence victim (episode 61)
- Neetha Shetty as Latika Rai, actress(episode 63) / Mahi, NGO worker (episode 121)
- Amrapali Dubey as Urmila Satija,Adv. Kailash Satija's wife and killer(episode 70)
- Harshad Arora as Aniket (episode 83)
- Neena Cheema as Kalyani Pratap Singh (episode 83)
- Anushka Singh as Pushpa Chhabria, Anjali's sister and killer(episode 85)
- Raman Khatri as Dinesh Chopra (episode 85)
- Nisha Nagpal as Anjali Menon, Neena's friend and Ashok's girlfriend (episode 9) / Kiran Arvind Joshi/ Seema (episode 90)
- Ekta Tiwari as Sheela Taware (episode 87)
- Shehzad Sheikh as Viren Sharma (episode 98)
- Kishwer Merchant as Dr Chhaya Sinha, anthropologist(episode 99)
- Vinti Idnani as Dolly Chopra (episode 103)
- Sudesh Berry as Auto-Driver S. Yadav (episode 104)
- Narayani Shastri as Senior Inspector Lata Mane (episode 106)
- Alihassan Turabi as Raghu,serial killer (episode 108)
- Vikas Bhalla as Neeraj (episode 109)
- Sumeet Kaul as Criminal Antagonist (episode 111)
- Tanvi Thakkar as Smita Shastri (episode 114)
- Navin Prabhakar as a Psychopath (episode 115)
- Sanjay Swaraj as Mr Patel (episode 118)
- Vinod Kapoor as Dr Abhijeet Ghosh (episode 120)
- Samiksha Bhatnagar as ACP Preeti (Pune Police Special Branch), Atjun's friend (episode 122)
- Daya Shankar Pandey as Taxi Driver Aslam Khan, serial killer (episode 122)
- Gurdeep Kohli as Senior Inspector Meenakshi Dixit, investigating officer of Arjun's fake death case(episode 124)
- Arjun Punj as Inspector Raghu Rajput, Meenakshi's subordinate (episode 124)
- Rishika Mihani as Psychiatrist Chitra, serial rapist killer (episode 125)

Recurring Cast [From episode 129]

- Shaleen Malhotra as ACP Arjun Suryakant Rawte
- Behzaad Khan as ACP Sameer Dhamsingh Rathore
- Rohit Purohit as Karan, former history sheeter turned mechanic and detective Robin Hooda, Simran and Arjun's friend
- Sheena Bajaj as Simran, aspiring actress and Karan Arjun's friend
- Shruti Bisht as Anjali (Techie), 8 years old school student at Arjun's school

Cameos

- Saanvi Talwar as Priyanka Barar (episode 130)
- Aditi Gowitrikar as Mohini (Episode 134)
- Ashwin Kaushal as Karsanbhai Patel / Mr Mehta (episode 136)
- Puneet Tejwani as Makrand (episode 136)
- Nandini Singh as Priyal (episode 142)

== List of episodes ==
No.	Name	Air Date
1	Arjun tackles human trafficking	11/08/2012
2	The missing scarf	12/08/2012
3	The poisoned groom	18/08/2012
4	The peeper	19/08/2012
5	The dead witness	25/08/2012
6	The leaked papers	26/08/2012
7	The missing woman	1/09/2012
8	Arjun saves Kalkee Desai	2/09/2012
9	The Double Murder	8/09/2012
10	The dead body in the car	9/09/2012
11	Arjun hides in the truck	15/09/2012
12	The murder of the fiance	16/09/2012
13	The stolen idol	22/09/2012
14	The antiques collector	23/09/2012
15	Murder in the pool	29/09/2012
16	The hostage professors	6/10/2012
17	Death of a superstar	7/10/2012
18	The doctor's wife	12/10/2012
19	The murdering witch	14/10/2012
20	Death during Dusshera	20/10/2012
21	Deadly Virus	21/10/2012
22	The ACP's murder	27/10/2012
23	The Masked Man	28/10/2012
24	A new-born is abducted	3/11/2012
25	Heart attack or murder?	4/11/2012
26	Money in the house	10/11/2012
27	A father is kidnapped	11/11/2012
28	The murder of the constable	17/11/2012
29	Robbery and Double Murder	18/11/2012
30	Murder amnesia	24/11/2012
31	Insanity leads to murder	25/11/2012
32	Fake currency and murder	1/12/2012
33	The secret in the paintings	2/12/2012
34	The MMS scandal	8/12/2012
35	Arjun saves a wrestler's life	9/12/2012
36	A magician's murder	15/12/2012
37	The death of primary suspects	16/12/2012
38	ETF uncovers a drug racket	22/12/2012
39	The 30-year-old movie ticket	23/12/2012
40	The superstar's son	29/12/2012
41	The innocent murderer	30/12/2012
42	The death of the reality star	5/01/2013
43	The deadly dabba	6/01/2013
44	Secrets from past life	12/01/2013
45	Ram Naik is murdered	13/01/2013
46	ETF investigates a bomb blast	19/01/2013
47	The death of the jailor	20/01/2013
48	The welfare scheme	26/01/2013
49	Death of a witness	27/01/2013
50	Missing from the cubicle	2/02/2013
51	Shot dead in a club	9/02/2013
52	Death of a foreigner	10/02/2013
53	The murdering chain snatchers	16/02/2013
54	Death of a painter	17/02/2013
55	An actor dies on stage	23/02/2013
56	Death in the forest	24/02/2013
57	Bomb on the bus	2/03/2013
58	The bridal dress	3/03/2013
59	Death of a fraudster	9/03/2013
60	The murdered bride	10/03/2013
61	A hi-tech hostage situation	16/03/2013
62	ETF deals with a bomb blast	17/03/2013
63	Case of the missing crown	30/03/2013
64	Exposing a snake poison racket	31/03/2013
65	A violinist is killed	6/04/2013
66	A murder of revenge	7/04/2013
67	ETF deals with a missing woman	13/04/2013
68	Son trapped in gambling drama	14/04/2013
69	A double murder	20/04/2013
70	The case of the dying lawyers	21/04/2013
71	Murdered by black magic	27/04/2013
72	ETF deals with Rahul's murder	28/04/2013
73	The Bunty Puri kidnapping case	4/05/2013
74	A crime reporter is killed	5/05/2013
75	The Shravanpur disappearances	11/05/2013
76	Swimmer dies in swimming pool	12/05/2013
77	A prescription for murder	18/05/2013
78	ETF deals with KK's murder	19/05/2013
79	A kidnapping or an affair?	25/05/2013
80	ETF solves Ruchika's suicide	26/05/2013
81	Why was Tinku killed?	2/06/2013
82	ETF deals with Deshraj murder	8/06/2013
83	The case of the antique sword	9/06/2013
84	ETF investigates Aarti's murder	15/06/2013
85	ETF investigates Anjali's murder	16/06/2013
86	ETF crack a drowning case	22/06/2013
87	A family is murdered	23/06/2013
88	Husband and wife are killed	29/06/2013
89	A life insurance scam?	30/06/2013
90	ETF deals with Arvind's death	6/07/2013
91	A writer who knew too much	7/07/2013
92	The case of serial suicides	14/07/2013
93	The family misleads the ETF	20/07/2013
94	Government doctor is killed	21/07/2013
95	A dead body is stolen from ETF	27/07/2013
96	Arjun's past stares at him	28/07/2013
97	The Kajal murder case	11/08/2013
98	A false confession	17/08/2013
99	A cold case returns	18/08/2013
100	The possessed murderer	24/08/2013
101	ETF deals with a serial killer	25/08/2013
102	The case of the haunting cat	31/08/2013
103	Motorcycle wars turn fatal	1/09/2013
104	A psychopath killer is arrested	7/09/2013
105	New mothers in danger	8/09/2013
106	A sex worker's murder	14/09/2013
107	ETF's supernatural case	21/09/2013
108	Another serial killer emerges	22/09/2013
109	ETF investigates a double murder	28/09/2013
110	The girl who was burnt alive	29/09/2013
111	Arjun saves Sakshi	5/10/2013
112	Speed kills'	6/10/2013
113	A killer who performs funerals	12/10/2013
114	The death of the unmarried girls	19/10/2013
115	A psychopath on the loose	20/10/2013
116	A suicide turns into a murder	26/10/2013
117	Premonitions and murders	27/10/2013
118	Killers returns from the dead?	2/11/2013
119	No mercy for a serial killer	3/11/2013
120	ETF investigates Swati's murder	9/11/2013
121	ETF investigates Maahi's murder	10/11/2013
122	ETF deals with a poisoning	16/11/2013
123	A conspiracy against Arjun	17/11/2013
124	The media reports Arjun's death	23/11/2013
125	The murder of immortal men	24/11/2013
126	Someone is trying to kill Arjun	30/11/2013
127	College students are killed	1/12/2013
128	Another organ trading	7/12/2013
129	Arjun is arrested	8/12/2013
130	Justice for Priyanka	14/12/2013
131	The case of a missing journalist	15/12/2013
132	Arjun probes Asha's disappearance	21/12/2013
133	Another supernatural case	22/12/2013
134	Arjun investigates Mohini's death	28/12/2013
135	ETF probes an honor killing	29/12/2013
136	Arjun and Karan accused of murder	4/01/2014
137	Avenging Munna's death	5/01/2014
138	Simran goes missing	11/01/2014
139	A drug dealer is killer	12/01/2014
140	Karan solves Parmanand's murder	18/01/2014
141	A child killer is nabbed	19/01/2014
142	An unnatural death	25/01/2014
143	Karan and Arjun rescue Chutki	26/01/2014
144	Why did Ishita have to die?	16/02/2014
145	Shekhar Mittal's mysterious death	23/02/2014

== Critical reception ==
DNA India said that it has good action scenes, but Malhotra was "a little stiff".
