= Jo Biwi Se Kare Pyaar =

Indian television series

- Genre: Romance; Cooking show.
- Starring: See Below
- Country of origin: India
- Original language: Hindi
- No. of seasons: 1
- No. of episodes: 40

Production
- Production location: India
- Running time: approximately 21 minutes
- Production company: Deepti Bhatnagar Productions

Original release
- Network: SAB TV
- Release: 28 October – 20 December 2013

Jo Biwi Se Kare Pyaar is an Indian television series which aired on SAB TV from 28 October 2013 to 20 December 2013. It is India's first fiction cooking show. The show's distinctive format received positive reviews, and almost two years later, in 2015, Chalti Ka Naam Gaadi was announced as a newly updated version of this show with a new format.

== Synopsis ==
Jo Biwi Se Kare Pyaar is a show about a newly married working couple Aditya and Suhani Khanna who as amateurs cook try to improve their hand at cooking after getting inspired on their anniversary by Prestige Smart Kitchen appliances and cookware that makes cooking fun and easy. They realize that the cooking time is the only time that can bring them together after the long day's work and hence decide to cook together every day thereby improving their culinary skills and simultaneously rekindle their romance in the kitchen that was being affected by their busy work schedules.

== Cast ==
- Arjun Bijlani as Aditya Khanna
- Shweta Gulati as Suhani Aditya Khanna
- Gungun Uprari as Naina Mohit Khanna
- Rakesh Paul as Mohit Khanna
- Amit Behl as Mr. Batra
- Shivaam Jaggdish as Various characters
- Anang Desai as Suhani's Boss
