= Adhuri Kahaani Hamari =

Indian television series

- Genre: Fantasy; Romance; Drama
- Created by: Gul Khan
- Written by: Divy Nidhi Sharma; Aparajita Sharma
- Screenplay by: Janish Erajadar; Manish Paliwaal
- Story by: Anuradha Tiwari; Mahesh Panday; Vikram Khurana
- Directed by: Arshad Khan; Lalit Mohan
- Creative director: Meet Kohli
- Starring: Laksh Lalwani; Mahima Makwana
- Country of origin: India
- Original language: Hindi
- No. of seasons: 1
- No. of episodes: 131

Production
- Producers: Gul Khan; Karishma Jain
- Production locations: Mumbai, Maharashtra, India
- Cinematography: Raju Goli; Raju Deshmukh
- Editors: Santosh Singh; Munna Prajapati
- Camera setup: Multi-camera
- Running time: 22 minutes
- Production company: 4 Lions Films

Original release
- Network: &TV
- Release: 16 November 2015 – 13 May 2016

Adhuri Kahaani Hamari (transl. Our incomplete story) is an Indian romantic fantasy drama television series that premiered on 16 November 2015 on &TV. Produced by Gul Khan under the banner of 4 Lions Films, it stars Laksh Lalwani and Mahima Makwana.

== Plot ==
Manasvini "Manu" (Mahima Makwana) is killed by an ichhadhaari naagin (a shape-shifting snake) named Maya at the age of 16. Maya is jealous of Prince Madhav's (Laksh Lalwani) attention towards Manu, and to take Manu's place in Madhav's life, Maya kills her.

Years later, Manasvini's soul returns as Radhika, who is a film-making student. Radhika lands up in Narayanpuri, where the ancient Garuda Temple is located. Radhika comes to terms with her past life during this journey as Manasvini, and some intriguing secrets are revealed to her about Manasvini, Madhav and Maya's relationship. The characters are shown in the past, where Maya kills each family member and tries to kill Manu. By mistake, Madhav is hurt, Manu stabs Maya with a Trishul, and Maya bites Manu. The three of them die together.

Back in the present, Radhika finds Krish, who is Madhav's reborn form and marries him with the help of Tulsi, a shape-shifting snake who comes to unite Radhika and Krish to undo the evil done to the loving couple on behalf of the Naagvansh. In Krish's house, Preeti, his sister-in-law, is a daayan, (a witch), and has a hidden motive. She tortures Radhika by abducting Krish. She tries to kill Radhika, but Radhika is saved by Tulsi, who gives her her powers, thus making her a naagin. Radhika uses these powers to transform Preeti into a human being any special powers.

In the end, Radhika avenges Krish by killing the daayan Preeti.

== Cast ==
=== Main ===
- Laksh Lalwani as :
  - Yuvraj Maadhav Shekhawat - The crown prince of Sitapur, Manu's childhood friend turned husband.
  - Krish Malhotra - Yuvraj Maadhav's reincarnation, A passionate singer and a painter. He is a rich businessman. Radhika's husband.
  - Karan - Krish's look alike. Preeti's boyfriend.

- Mahima Makwana as
  - Manasvini 'Mannu' Choudhry Shekhawat (Devrakshika)
  - Radhika Krish Malhotra (née Khosla)

=== Recurring ===
==== Before rebirth story (2015-2016) ====
- Suhani Dhanki as Maya, an evil naagin
- Nitin Sahrawat as Raja Lakshman Dev
- Amrapali Gupta as Anamika, Queen of Naag vansh, Bade Raja's lover
- Gajendra Chauhan as Bade Raja, Madhav's father
- Pragati Mehra as Maithali, Badi Rani, Madhav's mother
- Nitin Sahrawat as Chhote Raja, Bade Raja's younger brother
- Preet Kaur Madhan as Chotti Rani, Chhote Raja's wife
- Shubhangi Atre Poorey as Devsena, Manasvini's aunt, former Devrakshika
- Juhi Aslam as Takshika, Maya's boss, head of the ichhadhaari naags

==== Post rebirth story (2016) ====
- Himani Shivpuri as Radhika's aunt
- Nupur Alankar as Krish's mother
- Unknown as Balvinder, Krish's uncle
- Dolly Minhas as Pammi, Balvinder's wife
- Love Kwatra as Om, Krish's elder brother
- Unknown as Mehak, Krish's sister
- Kashvi Kothari as Tulsi, a young naagin who later transfers her power to Radhika
- Nisha Nagpal as Avni, Mehak's friend
- Ronit Chauhan as Purushharth, Balvinder and Pammi's son, Avni's husband
- Unknown as Baba Gorakdas, a snake charmer and helps Preeti in assassinating Radhika
- Pratyusha Banerjee as Naagin (Cameo appearance in song)
- Rashami Desai as Preeti, Krish's sister-in-law and a daayan ( antagonist)
- Deepshikha Nagpal as Daayani, Preeti's evil sister

== History ==
=== Controversy ===
There were rumors that Mahima slapped Laksh during a rehearsal of &TV holi event. However, later on in an interview Laksh clarified the rumors and said:

The issue has been blown out of proportion. It was a trivial argument, which often happens between any two co-actors. I didn't react when she excitedly applied colors on me during a media interaction at the Holi event as I realize it was unintentional on her part.

In March 2016 an intimate scene was being to be shot between Laksh aka Krish and Mahima aka Radhika. However, Mahima denied doing it. During a press interview, she said:

Yes I refused to do the scene because I felt it was too intimate. My mother's presence has got nothing to do with my refusal to shoot. I am very young to film such sequences. Hence I had reservations. Even if my mother wasn't present, I would not have done it because I felt it was too much. I had a word with my director and explained to him my discomfort would be visible in the scene too. I told him to tone it down to a level where I could be comfortable filming it. I did not want the show to suffer and had no intentions of inconveniencing those involved. I readily shot when they made the changes.

=== Accidents ===
In January 2016, Mahima got injured on the set while shooting for a prominent jail sequence, wherein she had to run away breaking the chains. However, she ended up injuring her head while shooting for it. Nevertheless, she continued to shoot and completed her scene. Later on, people on the sets panicked and took her to the doctor to get the CT scan done. During a press interview she said:

I was very excited, as I got the opportunity to perform an act like Deepika Padukone from "Bajirao Mastani". During the last shot I had to twirl the chain and when I pulled the chain from both the sides it came falling on my head and I was injured badly.

Again in March 2016, Nupur Alankar got injured while shooting for a death sequence.
