= Bandhan Saat Janamon Ka =

- Genre: Drama
- Created by: Shakuntalam Telefilms
- Written by: Sampuran Anand; Shashi Mittal
- Directed by: Neelima Inder Das
- Starring: See below
- Voices of: Shreya Ghoshal
- Music by: Abhijeet Hegdepatil KK Inder Das Ismail Umar Khan
- Opening theme: "Bandhan Saat Janamon Ka"
- Country of origin: India
- Original language: Hindi
- No. of seasons: 1
- No. of episodes: 245

Production
- Producers: Shyamashish Bhattacharya; Neelima Bajpai
- Camera setup: Multi-camera
- Running time: 24 minutes
- Production company: Shakuntalam Telefilms

Original release
- Network: Colors TV
- Release: 21 July 2008 – 26 June 2009

Bandhan Saat Janamon Ka (transl. Binding Of Seven Lives) is an Indian television series which premiered on Colors TV on 21 July 2008.

== Plot ==
The tale is about, a bright, mature, and simple girl, Janvi, who finds herself entangled in a web of dowry woes after her marriage to Parth. The story begins with the Gupta family, Parth's relatives, demanding 2.5 million rupees from Janvi's father, Trilok Agarwal, under the false pretense that Parth is in prison.

As the Gupta family's greed increases, they harass Janvi's father, causing him immense stress and triggering asthma attacks. Despite his efforts to meet their numerous demands, including trying to sell a portion of his house, Janvi's father becomes increasingly desperate.

Meanwhile, Janvi faces her own struggles within the Gupta household. She's subjected to physical and emotional abuse, locked in a dark storeroom, and forced to do hard chores. Her aunt, Shobhna, on the other hand adds to her family's financial burdens, worsening Trilok's health.

Janvi's father succumbs to an asthma attack, and dies, and the Gupta family denies Janvi the opportunity to attend his funeral. Nikita, a family member, manipulates Janvi by giving her false hope that she'll be taken to the hospital to see her father.

As Janvi navigates these troubles, she discovers the dark truth about the Gupta family's motivations. She also learns about Devang, Parth's brother, who is struggling with mental health issues due to the tragic loss of his wife, Ritu, who was also a victim of the dowry violence.

== Cast ==
- Gungun Uprari as Janvi Agarwal and Janvi Parth Gupta
- Vishal Gandhi as Parth Gupta
- Anuj Thakur as Ayush
- Vandana Gupte as Kamini
- Ansha Sayed as Nikita Gupta
- Shailesh Datar as Trilok Agarwal
- Dhruv Lather as Devang
- Shahnawaz Pradhan
