= Surjit Saha =

Indian actor

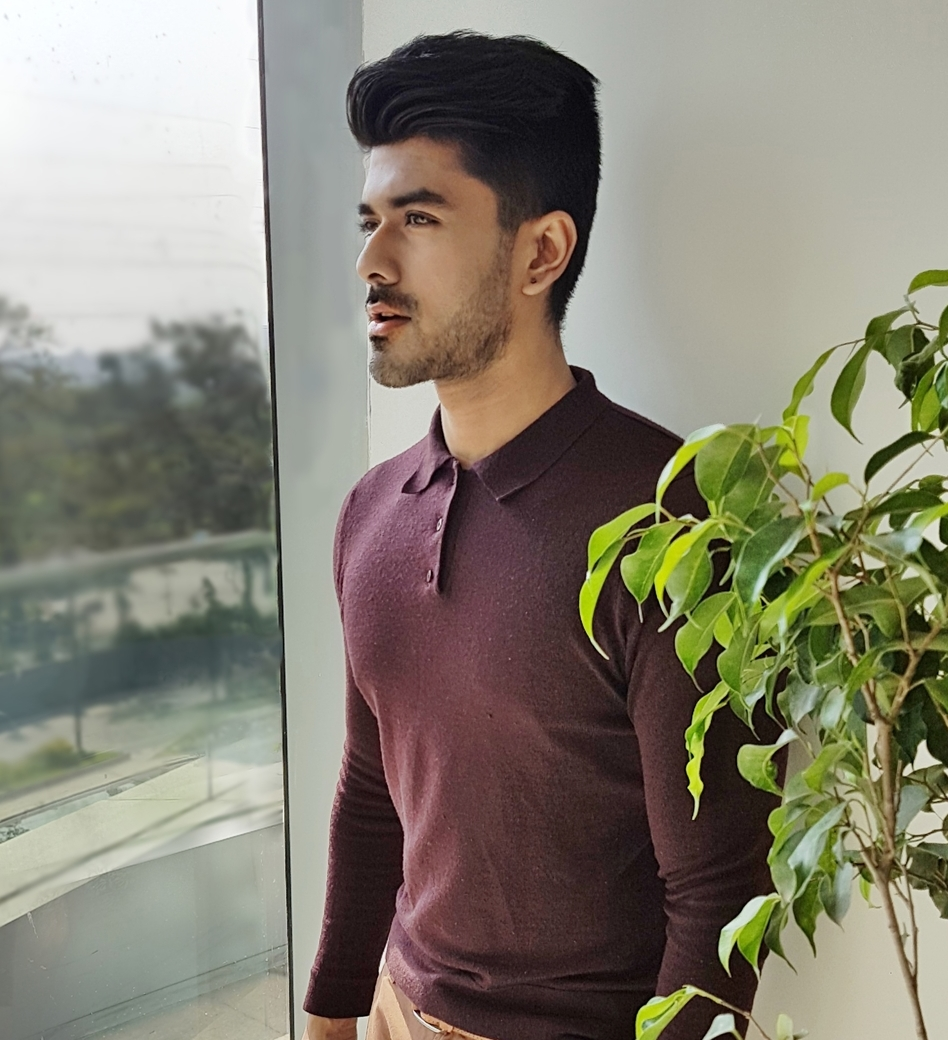
- Born: Kolkata
- Occupations: Actor, model
- Years active: 2014—present
- Notable work: Badi Door Se Aaye Hai

Surjit Saha (born 25 May 1993) is an Indian actor, model & social media Influencer. Saha was born in Kolkata and is Bengali by origin. He is best known for playing the character of Agent Q in Badi Door Se Aaye Hai on SAB TV.

== Career ==
Saha started his career as a fashion stylist and later took up modelling and acting as his profession. He has done several print shoots for newspapers like The Telegraph (Calcutta) and Sakalbela. He was first seen on a show called Chidiya Ghar on SAB TV. He played a cameo in the show as Rajveer. Soon after, he was cast in Badi Door Se Aaye Hai for the same channel. Saha has also done a show for Colors TV called Thapki Pyar Ki. In 2016, Saha was finalized to play the lead in a Pakistani show named Hum Dono, marking his first international project; however, the show did not go on air.

In 2022, he portrayed Bunty Chaudhary in StarPlus' show Rajjo.

== Modeling ==
Saha has been part of few commercial ads like Bajaj Allianz General Insurance and digital media modelling for MTV style check. Saha has also been an integral part of Rise 2017 a calendar spreading awareness for Parkinson's disease and raising donations for Hrishikesh's Centre of Contemporary Dance curing the people affected by Parkinson's disease.

== Personal life ==
Saha was born and brought up in Kolkata and did his schooling from St. Mary's Orphanage & Day School, Kolkata. He is the younger of the two siblings.

== Television ==
TV Show	Channel	Character	Year
Chidiya Ghar	SAB TV	Rajveer	2014
Thapki Pyaar Ki	Colors TV	Sunil	2015
Badi Doooor Se Aaye Haiو	SAB TV	Agent Q	2015-2016
Chandrakanta	Colors TV	Bhuwan	2017
Khichdi	Star Plus	Bengali Painter (Special appearance)	2018
Rajjo	Star Plus	Bunty Chaudhary	2022
