= Rajjo (TV series) =

Indian television series

- Genre: Romance; Drama
- Written by: Mrinal Jha, Bhavna Vyas
- Starring: Celesti Bairagey; Rajveer Singh; Gungun Uprari; Surjit Saha
- Country of origin: India
- Original language: Hindi
- No. of seasons: 1
- No. of episodes: 190

Production
- Producers: Mukta Dhond; Bodhisatva Datta
- Production location: Mumbai
- Camera setup: Multi-camera
- Production company: Bits N Bots Media

Original release
- Network: StarPlus
- Release: 22 August 2022 – 5 March 2023

Related
- Aalta Phoring

Rajjo is an Indian Hindi-language television drama series that premiered on 22 August 2022 on StarPlus and digitally streams on Disney+ Hotstar. The show is produced by Bits N Bots Media and stars Celesti Bairagey, Rajveer Singh and Gungun Uprari in the titular roles. It is an official Hindi remake of Star Jalsha’s Aalta Phoring. It was replaced by Teri Meri Doriyaann in its timeslot.

== Plot ==
The show revolves around the trials and tests of an aspiring athlete Rajjo from Uttarakhand. Her mother, Manorama, has a dark past, and hence is against Rajjo’s dreams of turning an athlete. After getting separated by her mother in Kedarnath flood and crossing-paths with a fertilizer businessman Arjun, how will Rajjo react to the past, and manage to win her dreams in the present?

== Cast ==
=== Main ===
- Celesti Bairagey as Rajjo Dhaki Thakur – An aspiring athlete; Manorama and Pushkar's daughter; Kalindi, Niharika and Bunty's half-sister; Mukund, Sagar and Pankhuri's cousin; Vicky's ex-fiancé; Arjun's wife (2022—2023)
- Rajveer Singh as Arjun Singh Thakur – A fertilizer businessman; Madhumalti and Pratap's younger son; Chirag's brother; Mukund, Rocky, Sagar and Pankhuri's cousin; Urvashi's ex-fiancé; Rajjo's husband. (2022—2023)
- Gungun Uprari as Manorama "Manno" Dhaki – A former athlete; Pushkar's ex-lover; Rajjo's mother. (2022—2023)

=== Recurring ===
- Pakkhi Hegde as Madhumalti Thakur – Pratap's wife; Chirag and Arjun's mother; Rocky's aunt; Siya's grandmother. (2022—2023)
- Surjit Saha as Bunty Chaudhary – Kavita and Pushkar's son; Kalindi and Niharika's brother; Rajjo's half-brother; Mukund, Sagar and Pankhudi's cousin (2022—2023)
- Siddharth Vasudev as Pushkar Chaudhary – Jhilmil's brother; Manorama's ex-lover; Kavita's husband; Kalindi, Niharika, Bunty and Rajjo's father; Siya's grandfather. (2022—2023)
- Kajal Sharma as Niharika Chaudhary – Pushkar and Kavita's younger daughter; Kalindi and Bunty's sister; Rajjo's half-sister.
- Avinash Sahijwani as Pratap Singh Thakur – Keshav's elder son; Kartik's brother; Madhumalti's husband; Chirag and Arjun's father; Siya's grandfather
- Jaya Binju as Kavita Chaudhary – Pushkar's wife; Kalindi, Niharika and Bunty's mother; Rajjo's step-mother; Siya's grandmother
- Maleeka Ghai as Jhilmil Chaudhary Thakur – Pushkar's sister; Kartik's wife; Mukund, Sagar and Pankhuri's mother.(2022)
- Premchand Singh as Kartik Singh Thakur – Keshav's younger son; Pratap's brother; Jhilmil's husband; Mukund, Sagar and Pankhuri's father. (2022)
- Utkarsh Gupta as Chirag Singh Thakur – Madhumalti and Pratap's elder son; Arjun's brother; Mukund, Rocky, Sagar and Pankhuri's cousin; Kalindi's husband; Siya's father. (2022—2023)
- Divyangana Jain as Kalindi Chaudhary Thakur – Kavita and Pushkar's elder daughter; Niharika and Bunty's sister; Rajjo's half-sister; Mukund, Sagar and Pankhudi's cousin; Chirag's wife; Siya's mother; Rocky's ex-lover (2022—2023)
- Aayushi Bhave Tilak as Urvashi – Dheeraj's daughter; Arjun's ex-fiancée. (2022)
- Ankit Bhardwaj as Mukund Singh Thakur – Jhilmil and Kartik's elder son; Sagar and Pankhuri's brother; Chirag, Arjun, Kalindi, Niharika, Bunty and Rajjo's cousin; Swara's husband
- Minoli Nandwana as Swara Thakur – Mukund's wife
- Vedant Sharan as Shesh - Rajjo’s one sided lover
- Itika Kabra as Siya Thakur – Kalindi and Chirag's daughter
- Niel Satpuda as Sagar Singh Thakur – Jhilmil and Kartik's younger son; Mukund and Pankhuri's brother; Chirag, Arjun, Kalindi, Niharika, Bunty and Rajjo's cousin
- Roselyn D'Souza as Pankhuri Thakur – Jhilmil and Kartik's daughter; Mukund and Sagar's sister; Chirag, Arjun, Kalindi, Niharika, Bunty and Rajjo's cousin
- Ravi Jhankal as Keshav Singh Thakur – Pratap and Kartik's father; Chirag, Mukund, Arjun, Sagar and Pankhuri's grandfather; Siya's great-grandfather
- Pratham Kunwar as Rocky – Madhumalti's nephew; Chirag and Arjun's cousin; Kalindi's lover
- Ankit Narang as Vicky – Rajjo's ex-fiancée
- Suraj Bharadwaj as Bharat
- Kalp Shah
- Sharanpreet Matharoo
- Harsh Chatrath as Dheeraj – Urvashi's father
- Kushagre Dua as Naman Singh Thakur – Anil and Shobha's son; Arjun's cousin

== Production ==
=== Broadcast ===
The show was moved from its original time slot on 4 January 2023. It was replaced by Teri Meri Doriyaann in its original time slot. Speaking on the same, actor Rajveer Singh said, "At the end of the day, it is the channel's decision. Our show is moving to that slot and I think we will do good in that slot, too. In the 7 pm slot, we have been consistent and so I don't feel that our show was moved due to low ratings. In fact, in the last two weeks, our ratings have improved. Maybe, the channel wants to make the 6.30 slot more engaging for viewers."

=== Casting ===
Celesti Bairagey was chosen after she released a video of herself in a Gangubai Kathiawadi clip, which went viral.

Post Bairagey, Rajveer Singh and Gungun Uprari too were signed along with other actors to join the cast.

=== Release ===
The first promo of Rajjo was released in July 2022. It replaced Kabhi Kabhie Ittefaq Sey from 22 August 2022.

=== Title ===
The show was initially promoted with the title Udti Ka Naam Rajjo, before it was modified to Rajjo.
