= Neerja – Ek Nayi Pehchaan =

Indian romantic drama television series

- Genre: Drama; Romance; Social
- Created by: Uddeept Dutt Gaur
- Written by: Uddeept Dutt Gaur: Anjali Bahura
- Creative directors: Seema Sharma; Sudhir Sharma
- Starring: See below
- Country of origin: India
- Original language: Hindi
- No. of seasons: 1
- No. of episodes: 219

Production
- Producer: Sudhir Sharma
- Production locations: Kolkata; Mumbai
- Camera setup: Multi-camera
- Running time: 20-22 minutes
- Production company: Sunshine Productions

Original release
- Network: Colors TV
- Release: 10 July 2023 – 18 February 2024

Neerja – Ek Nayi Pehchaan (transl. Neerja - A New Identity) is an Indian Hindi-language romantic action drama television series that premiered on 10 July 2023 to 18 February 2024 on Colors TV and digitally streams on JioCinema. Produced under Sunshine Productions, it stars Aastha Sharma, Rajveer Singh, Sneha Wagh and Kamya Panjabi.

== Cast ==
=== Main ===
- Aastha Sharma as Neerja Bagchi: Protima's daughter; Chakri's best friend; Didun's enemy; Abir's wife; Bappa's aunt (2023 - 2024)
  - Myra Vaikul as Child Neerja (2023)
- Rajveer Singh as Abir Bagchi: Vijay and Mausumi's younger son; Brother of Kaushik; Sarthak's half-brother; uncle of Bappa; Neerja's husband; Trisha's ex-fiance (2023 - 2024)
  - Nirbhay Thakur as Child Abir Bagchi (2023)

=== Recurring ===
- Alma Hussein as Trisha Chakravarthy: Abir's ex-fiancee and obsessive lover; Didun's right hand (2023 - 2024)
- Sneha Wagh as Protima: A prostitute; Neerja's mother (2023) (Dead)
- Kamya Panjabi as Didun: Head of Sonagachi; Neerja’s enemy; Protima’s murderer (2023 - 2024)
- Ayub Khan as Vijay Bagchi: Shubhra's brother; Mausumi's husband; Kaushik, Abir and Sarthak's father; Bappa's grandfather (2023 - 2024)
- Vibha Chibber as Shubhra Bagchi: Vijay's sister; Kaushik, Abir and Sarthak's paternal aunt (2023)
- Anindita Chatterjee as Mausumi Bagchi: Vijay's second wife; Kaushik and Abir's mother; Sarthak's step mother; Bappa's grandmother (2023 - 2024)
- Abhishek Rawat as Kaushik Bagchi: Vijay and Mausumi's elder son; Abir's brother; Sarthak's half-brother; Munmun's husband; Bappa's father; Chakri's rapist (2023 - 2024)
- Aayushi Bhave as Munmun Bagchi: Kaushik's wife; Bappa's mother (2023 - 2024)
- Yug Bhanushali as Bappa Bagchi: Kaushik and Munmun's son (2023 - 2024)
- Kushagre Dua as Sarthak Bagchi: Vijay's son; Mausumi's step son; Kaushik and Abir's half-brother; uncle of Bappa (2023 - 2024)
- Baali Singh Chauhan as Laltu (2024)
- Satya Tiwari as Bappan: Neerja's obsessive boyfriend (2023)
- Akshita Tiwari as Chakri: Neerja's best friend (2023 - 2024) (Dead)
- Aftab Karim as Sheikh (2023)
- Anasua Chakraborty as IPS Shefali Ganguly (2023 - 2024)
- Unknown as Shamli (2023 - 2024)

== Production ==
=== Casting ===
In April 2023, it was announced that Bengali actress Debchandrima Singha Roy would play the lead role, but Aastha Sharma was roped in for Neerja's role. Vivian Dsena was the first choice for the male lead but Rajveer Singh was cast opposite Sharma.

Kamya Punjabi, Sneha Wagh, Ayub Khan and Aayushi Bhave roped in for important roles. In December 2023, Sneha Wagh quit the show due to her character death.

=== Filming ===
In April 2023, the filming of the show started in Mumbai. Few scenes were also shot in Kolkata.

=== Release ===
First promo of the show release on 7 May 2023 featured Myra Vaikul and Sneha Wagh as little Neerja and Protima respectively. The series was premiered on 10 July 2023.
