= Rajveer Singh (actor) =

Indian television actor and model (born 1986)

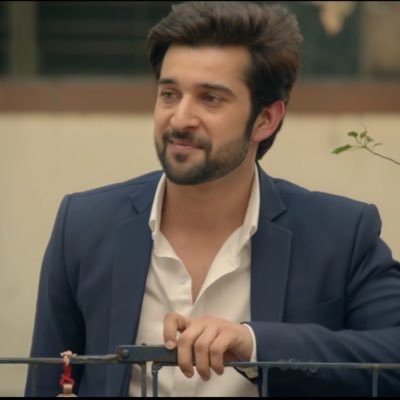
- Born: 4 September 1986 (age 40); Bahadurgarh, Haryana, India
- Occupations: Actor, Model, Writer
- Years active: 2014–present
- Known for: Sufiyana Pyaar Mera; Qurbaan Hua
- Spouse: Anagha Tawde (m. 2019)

Rajveer Singh (born 4 September 1986) is an Indian television actor and model. He is best known for playing lead roles in Sufiyana Pyaar Mera and Qurbaan Hua. From August 2022 to March 2023, he played the role of Arjun Singh Thakur in Rajjo.

== Career ==
Before becoming an actor, he was a farmer. In 2014, He made his television debut in the show Ishq Kills as Rajveer and Samar. In 2017, he appeared as Abir Anand, the male protagonist in Kya Qusoor Hai Amala Ka?; the Indian remake of the popular Turkish drama, Fatmagül'ün Suçu Ne?. In 2019, he appear in Sufiyana Pyaar Mera as Zaroon Shah. He also appeared in the movie de de pyaar de(2019) in a significant role.

From 2020 to 2021, he replaced Karan Jotwani as Neelkant "Neel" Dhyani in Qurbaan Hua. From August 2022 to March 2023, he portrayed the main lead Arjun Singh Thakur in Star Plus' show Rajjo. For his role in the series, he lost 8 kilograms. From 10 July 2023 to 18 February 2024, he played Abir Bagchi in Colors TV's Neerja – Ek Nayi Pehchaan.

From 2024 to 2025, he is playing Inspector Abhimanyu Sinha opposite Shambhavi Singh in Star Bharat's 10:29: Ki Aakhri Dastak. From September 2025 to May 2026, he was signed to play Rishi in StarPlus' Jhanak.

== Television ==
Year	Serial	Role	Notes
2014	Ishq Kills	Rajveer	Episodic Role
2014	Ishq Kills	Samar	Episodic Role
2017	Kya Qusoor Hai Amala Ka?	Abir Anand	Lead Role
2019	Sufiyana Pyaar Mera	Zaroon Shah	Lead Role
2020–2021	Qurbaan Hua	Neelkant "Neel" Bhatt Dhyani	Lead Role
2022–2023	Rajjo	Arjun Singh Thakur	Lead Role
2023–2024	Neerja – Ek Nayi Pehchaan	Abir Bagchi	Lead Role
2024–2025	10:29 Ki Aakhri Dastak	Inspector Abhimanyu Sinha	Lead Role
2025–2026	Jhanak	Inspector Rishi Chatterjee	Lead Role

== See also ==
- List of Indian television actresses
- List of Indian television actors
