= Shardul Pandit =

Indian actor and radio jockey (born 1985)

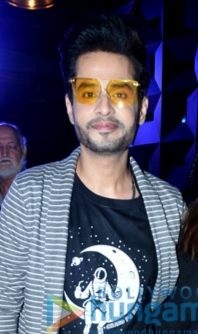
- Pandit in 2021
- Born: 28 November 1985 (age 40); Indore, Madhya Pradesh, India
- Occupations: Actor, radio jockey
- Years active: 2009 – present

Shardul Pandit (born 28 November 1985) is an Indian actor and radio jockey.

== Education ==
Pandit received a Master of Business Administration degree in advertising and public relations from the International Institute of Professional Studies (IIPS) Indore.

== Career ==
He started his career as a radio jockey with Radio Mirchi.

Following from his work in radio, Pandit made his acting debut with NDTV Imagine's serial Bandini, starring alongside Ronit Roy and Aasiya Kazi in lead roles. He also appeared in Kitani Mohabbat Hai (season 2) and Godh Bharaai.

In 2012, Pandit moved to Dubai to work as a RJ for Radio Mirchi International. However, he returned to Mumbai in 2015 to work as a VJ for 9XM. Pandit was also the commentator for the Box Cricket League (BCL).

In 2017, Pandit was cast in a co-lead role opposite Keerti Nagpure in the &TV show Kuldeepak. His role and pairing with Nagpure was praised by viewers.

== Television ==
Year	Title	Role	Notes
2009	Bandini	Maulik Dharamraj Mahiyavanshi / Maulik Kanji Waghela	
2010	Godh Bharaai	Gaurav	
2010	Kitani Mohabbat Hai (season 2)	Jai	
2011	Gunahon Ka Devta	Pavan	
2014–2019	Box Cricket League	Commentator	
2017	Kuldeepak	Devang Purohit	
2018	Siddhi Vinayak	Shivam Sen	
2020	Bigg Boss 14	Contestant	Entered as Wildcard on (Day 22); Evicted on (Day 43)
2021–present	Sirf Ek Minute	Host	Flipkart video quiz
2022	Channa Mereya	Armaan	
2023	Tere Ishq Mein Ghayal	Adi	

== See also ==
- List of Indian actors
- List of people from Madhya Pradesh
- List of people from Mumbai
