= Kitani Mohabbat Hai season 2 =

Kitani Mohabbat Hai
- Season 2
- Starring: See Below
- No. of episodes: 153

Release
- Original network: NDTV Imagine
- Original release: 1 November 2010 – 26 May 2011

Kitani Mohobbat Hai 2 is the second installment of Kitani Mohabbat Hai starring Kritika Kamra and Karan Kundra. The show begins with the story of Aarohi and Arjun torn between their warring families - a large joint family of police officers and lawyers, and a criminal family with ties to the underworld, respectively.

== Plot ==
Pampered, Aarohi Ahluwalia belongs to a large Punjabi family of police background though her father is a lawyer. Arjun Singhania, an orphan lives with his foster father Rudra, a renowned Don who trains him to be his henchman in the criminal underworld.

Arjun kidnaps Aarohi under his father's orders, only for them to fall in love with each other while he keeps her captive, and also protects her from his own enemies in an encounter. However, her family soon finds her and Arjun's identity is disclosed. Feeling betrayed, Aarohi agrees to marry a silly NRI boy Cheeku. Arjun tries his best to get his criminal records cleared and win Aarohi's approval. After her grandfather grants him a clean chit, his sister - who is pregnant - goes to the Ahluwalia house to convince Aarohi, but is pushed off the stairs by her jealous best friend Gauri, who is an ex-lover of Arjun and is now married to Aarohi's uncle.

The Singhanias blame the Ahluwalias for their daughter's miscarriage, and in an act of revenge, Arjun marries Aarohi and leaves her in the pandal, only for her to walk into the Singhania house and live with him as his wife, welcomed only by his grandmother, who is good friends with Aarohi's grandparents. Gradually, they begin to fall in love again amidst their several fights.

As Aarohi returns to her maternal house, it comes to light that Aarohi's grandfather committed a mistake which caused Arjun's mother's death. Arjun goes to kill Daddu in a fit of rage, but is stopped by Aarohi. On the other side, Mikhail, the Singhania's eldest son, who is jealous of the attention Arjun receives from their father, shoots Daddu, and Arjun is arrested. Aarohi tries to prove Arjun's innocence, and later helps him escape, but is herself locked up by her uncles. Soon, Daddu wakes up and testifies for Arjun, and they are released. They visit Arjun's maternal home, but Mikhail reaches there and tries to kill Arjun. Aarohi's uncles also reach the location, arrest him, and save them.

Arjun and Aarohi are finally united, and get married with the blessings of the entire family.

== Cast ==
=== Main ===
- Karan Kundrra as Arjun Singhania
- Kritika Kamra as Aarohi Ahluwalia
- Nitin Sahrawat as ACP Rajveer Singh Ahluwalia
- Parul Gulati as Gauri Ahluwalia

=== Recurring ===
- Mohan Kapoor as Rudrapratap Singhania
- Sana Makbul as Shefali
- Puneet Tejwani as Cheeku
- Aaradhna Uppal as Kumud Singhania
- Neelam Mehra as Teji Singhania
- Danish Pandor as Mikhail Singhania
- Mrinalini Tyagi as Raashi Singhania
- Rupesh Kataria as Romit Singhania
- Abhay Bhargava as Kartar Singh Ahluwalia
- Alka Pradhan as Daljeet Kaur Ahluwalia
- Saptrishi Ghosh as Arvind Singh Ahluwalia
- Hemaakshi Ujjain as Preeti Ahluwalia
- Farooq Saeed as Sudheer Singh Ahluwalia
- Pyumori Mehta as Amrit Ahluwalia
- Dilnaz Irani as Lovedeep Singh Ahluwalia
- Loveleen Kaur Sasan
- Areesz Gandhi as Jignesh
- Priya Chauhan as Simmi
- Karan Arora as Billu
- Saurav Chakrabarti as Danish Malhotra/Dhondu
- Shardul Pandit as Jai
- Namrata Kharkar as Archana
- Mohit Daga as Advocate Ram Punjabi
- Shefali Rana as Cheeku's mother
