= Ishq Kills =

Indian crime television series

- Created by: Anirban Bhattacharyya
- Written by: Shagufta Rafique; Anirban Bhattacharyya
- Directed by: Vishal Mahadkar: Rajat Mukherjee
- Presented by: Vikram Bhatt
- Theme music composer: Shadaab-Abhik
- Country of origin: India
- Original language: Hindi
- No. of seasons: 1

Production
- Producers: Anirban Bhattacharyya: Amar Deb; Nita Deb
- Camera setup: Multi-camera
- Running time: 45 minutes
- Production company: Rowdy Rascals Productions

Original release
- Network: StarPlus
- Release: 16 February – 11 May 2014

Ishq Kills (transl. Love Kills) is an Indian crime thriller television show, created by bestselling author and television producer Anirban Bhattacharyya which premiered on StarPlus on 16 February 2014. The show is based on true events and it wrapped up in 13 episodes. The show is produced by Rowdy Rascals Productions and hosted by Vikram Bhatt.

== Plot ==
Ishq Kills is a collection of 13 stories of love and revenge, sin, and retribution around forbidden relationships.
When love turns sour, it can lead to crime. Ishq Kills revolve around stories about unconventional love stories that started well but eventually went bad and led to criminal activities that could have been avoided by making sensible choices.

== Episodes ==
Episode no.	Title	On air date
1	Shaina & Rajveer's story	16 February 2014
2	Raj and Mahi's murderous love	23 February 2014
3	An employer, a maid and blackmail	2 March 2014
4	Man pushes wife into prostitution	9 March 2014
5	A powerful man, a scorned wife	16 March 2014
6	Kavita's revenge	23 March 2014
7	A sad marriage, a tragic affair	30 March 2014
8	A romance, incest and murder	6 April 2014
9	The greed of a woman	13 April 2014
10	Samar decides to get killed	20 April 2014
11	Fatal attraction	27 April 2014
12	Doctor or murderer?	4 May 2014
13	Greed, murder and the other woman	11 May 2014

== Storyline ==
- Episode 01: Shaina & Rajveer's story
  Shaina (Flora Saini), the successful and arrogant vice-president of a cosmetics company, falls in love with Rajveer (Rajveer Singh), a junior colleague, after he saves her from a bunch of goons. Shaina and Rajveer have a physical relationship. Then, Rajveer’s wife tells Shaina that she knows of the affair. What are Rajveer’s intentions?
- Episode 02: Raj and Mahi's murderous love
  Cousins Raj (Sachin Khurana) and Mahi (Priyal Gor) are in love with each other. But Mahi is afraid of Anuj and Manoj, her brothers. When they take off on a trip, Raj and Mahi get intimate. Later, on knowing the truth, Manoj beats up Mahi. But Manoj is unable to foresee her terrifying reaction.
- Episode 03: An employer, a maid and blackmail

Nanda (Shruti Bapna)who wears her saree exposing her midriff falls in love with her married employer Siddharth (Chandan Anand), not heeding her friend’s warning.One day while she was busy in kitchen Siddharth came to her seduced her by pinching her waist hard to which she denies but Siddharth confesses her.She is lured to get intimate with Siddharth. Anil, the cook, discovers the affair and blackmails her. Siddharth refuses to marry Nanda. What extreme measures will Nanda take now?

- Episode 04: Man pushes wife into prostitution

Due to huge gambling losses, Devendra (Kapil Nirmal) forces his wife Mihita (Srishty Rode) to get intimate with Neelesh, who pushes her into prostitution. Angered by Devendra, Mihita withdraws all money from the joint account. Soon, an accident results in Devendra being confined to bed

- Episode 05: A powerful man, a scorned wife

Thirteen years after eloping, Vikrant (Gaurav Bajaj), now a successful politician, ignores Ragini (Heena Parmar), his wife. Ragini soon discovers her husband’s affair with Richa. Vikrant informs Ragini of his intention to get a divorce. Even as Vikrant is appointed Chief Minister, he has to pay the price for his disloyalty to his wife.

- Episode 06: Kavita's revenge

Sonia’s parents, Ashok and Kavita (Parul Chaudhary) are separated. Sonia (Neelam Sivia) lives with her father. When Sonia becomes depressed and attempts suicide, Randhir (Tarun Khanna), her step-father protects her by bashing up Neel, her step-brother, for attempted molestation. What deadly consequence will Randhir and Sonia’s relationship have?

- Episode 07: A sad marriage, a tragic affair

Devika (Kiran Thapar) is married to Abhishek (Nitin Sahrawat), but ignored by her husband and lonely. She seeks solace in a neighbour, Prashant (Ayaz Ahmed). The friendship becomes an extramarital affair and Abhishek gets wind of it. Cornered, Devika opts to elope with Prashant. But then both the men in her life let her down and Devika has only one way out.

- Episode 08: A romance, incest and murder

Romi (Neetha Shetty) and Suchit are in love and he is very possessive of her. Romi confesses to Suchit that her elderly uncle forced her to have an illicit relationship with him. The uncle makes his will, leaving assets to Romi. Suchit shoots the uncle and Romi calls the police. Will there be more killing before the law takes its course?

- Episode 09: The greed of a woman

The Inspector General puts Inspector Ranvijay on the trail of Dilip (Puneet Vashisht), who manages the illegal activities of a powerful minister. Dilip, the womaniser, meets and falls in love with Rashmi (Himanshi Choudhry) and reveals to her the source of his income. When Inspector Ranvijay arrives on the scene, one of them is dead, and the other is missing.

- Episode 10: Samar decides to get killed

When Gayatri decides to marry her ex-lover Samar’s friend Sid, Samar makes an unsuccessful attempt to take his own life. He then hires a contract killer Tara and asks her to kill him after 48-hours. Even as Samar decides to enjoy his last two days, Tara meets with an accident.

- Episode 11: Fatal attraction

Superstar Aryan’s(Rohit Purohit) wife Tanya leaves him because of his workaholic schedule. A lonely Aryan befriends Urvashi(Harsha Khandeparkar). But Urvashi’s obsessive love for Aryan leads to murder and attempted suicide. When Aryan refuses to meet her, she escapes from hospital. How will Urvashi’s mad love story end?

- Episode 12: Doctor or murderer?

Priya (Priya Bathija) admits her alcoholic husband Akhil (Deepak Wadhwa) to a sanatorium where Dr. Kartik (Aniruddh Dave) is attracted to her. On a rainy day, Dr. Kartik offers to drop Priya home. This leads to an intimate affair between the two. Later, Akhil dies and Dr Kartik is accused of murder by Akhil’s mother. What is the truth?

- Episode 13: Greed, murder and the other woman

Rudra (KC Shankar) plans to kill his wealthy wife Neena (Pariva Pranati) and take over her property. Sabrina (Sukhmani Sadana), Rudra’s girlfriend befriends Neena and influences her to kill Rudra. Sabrina tampers with the brakes of his car. The plan works, but then Rudra, presumed dead, tries to kill Neena. He and Sabrina start a new life, but is Neena really dead?

== Cast ==
- E01 Shaina & Rajveer's story: Flora Saini as Shaina, Rajveer Singh as Rajveer/Samar and Charlie Chauhan as Ranjeeta/Rajveer's wife
- E02 Raj and Mahi's murderous love: Priyal Gor as Mahi, Sachin Khurana as Raj
- E03 An employer, a maid and blackmail: Shruti Bapna as Nanda, Chandan Anand as Siddharth and Niyati Joshi as Aarati: Siddharth's wife
- E04 Man pushes wife into prostitution: Srishty Rode as Mihita Devendra Sood, Kapil Nirmal as Devendra Sood and Manish Khanna as Mr. Chaddha
- E05 A powerful man, a scorned wife: Heena Parmar as Ragini and Gaurav Bajaj as Vikrant
- E06 Kavita's revenge: Neelam Sivia as Sonia and Parul Chaudhary as Kavita and Tarun Khanna as Randhir
- E07 A Sad Marriage, A Tragic Affair: Ayaz Ahmed as Prashant, Kiran Thapar as Devika, Nitin Sahrawat as Abhishek: Devika's husband
- E08 A romance, incest and murder: Neeta Shetty as Romi
- E09 The greed of a woman: Puneet Vashisht as Dilip and Himanshi Choudhry as Rashmi
- E10 Samar decides to get killed:
- E11 Fatal attraction: Rohit Purohit as Aryan, Harsha Khandeparkar as Urvashi, Ayaan Zubair Rehmani as Aryan and Tanya's son Rohit
- E12 Doctor or murderer?: Anirudh Dave as Dr. Kartik, Priya Bathija as Priya Akhil Rai and Jyoti Joshi as Mrs. Rai
- E13 Greed, murder and the other woman: KC Shankar as Rudra Pratap Singh,Pariva Pranati as Neena Rudra Pratap Singh and Sukhmani Sadana as Sabrina Fernandes
- Vineet Raina as Karan
- Rohit Purohit as Aryan
- Manasi Parekh
