= Sufiyana Pyaar Mera =

2019 Indian Hindi-language television series

- Genre: Drama
- Created by: Prateek Sharma
- Written by: Danish Javed; Prakriti Mukherjee; Janaki sharad Akash Deep
- Directed by: Arvind Gupta
- Starring: Helly Shah; Rajveer Singh
- Opening theme: Ishq Sufiyana by Monali Thakur and Javed Ali
- Composer: Sajid–Wajid
- Country of origin: India
- Original language: Hindi
- No. of seasons: 1
- No. of episodes: 177

Production
- Producer: Prateek Sharma
- Camera setup: Multi-Camera
- Running time: 21 minutes
- Production company: LSD Films

Original release
- Network: Star Bharat
- Release: 16 April – 9 November 2019

Sufiyana Pyaar Mera (transl. My Love Is Pure) is an Indian television series broadcast on Star Bharat. It starred Helly Shah and Rajveer Singh.

== Plot ==
Zaroon Shah, an NRI reached India to meet Kaynaat Shah to fulfill his father's wish though he himself is unwilling. When he arrives, he spots and falls in love with Kaynaat's look alike cousin Saltanat at first sight.

Upon seeing Kaynaat, Zaroon is confused on seeing their difference. Orthodox, Kaynaat lived and dressed in a traditional and conservative manner. Free spirited modern, Saltanat lived on her own terms and conditions.

Zaroon refuses to marry Kaynaat. Saltanat falls in love with him too. They decide to get married. Kaynaat plots against Saltanat hoping to keep them apart but fails. Soon, Saltanat discovers her conspiracies.

Her mother Zehnab reveals to her that Kaynaat is her twin sister not cousin and convinces her to not expose Kaynaat. Zaroon and Saltanat get married. Kaynaat does several attempts to take her place, but fails.

Madhav Sharma wants revenge from Kaynaat as 12 years back, she killed his sister Sakshi for having an affair with Kaynaat's father Khasaan; Zehnab helped her cover up the murder. Eventually, Kaynaat's truth is exposed.

Zaroon and Madhav join hands to fight against Kaynaat. Madhav starts falling for Saltanat, who lost her memory but regains it. She and Zaroon unite. Madhav goes to Delhi with his son Krish and promises to write to Saltanat every day.

=== 20 years later ===
Grown up, Krish resembles Madhav and reads his diary, where he confessed that he wrote letters to Saltanat every day but could never post them due to his one-sided love for her.

Krish goes to a dargah and prays. He meets Saltanat and Zaroon's daughter Shaira Shah. They share a smile. The show ends with new beginning of Shaira and Krish's story.

== Cast ==
=== Main ===
- Helly Shah as
  - Saltanat Shah Ghazi– Zehnab's daughter; Rubina and Nadeem's adopted daughter; Kaynaat's twin sister; Zaroon, Humza and Neelam's cousin; Zaroon's wife; Shaira's mother
  - Shaira Shah Ghazi – Saltanat and Zaroon's daughter; Krish's lover
  - Kaynaat Shah – Zehnab's daughter; Saltanat's twin sister; Zaroon, Humza and Neelam's cousin; Zaroon's obsessive lover
    - Pallavi Gupta replaced Helly Shah as Kaynaat Shah Ghazi
- Rajveer Singh as Zaroon Shah Khan – Ghazala and Mamoon's son; Kaynaat, Saltanat, Humza and Neelam's cousin; Saltanat's husband; Shaira's father
- Vijayendra Kumeria as
  - Madhav Kumar Sharma – Indu's son; Sakshi and Sneha's brother; Rupali's husband; Krish's father
  - Krish Sharma – Rupali and Madhav's son; Shaira's lover
    - Tanver Zaid as young Krish Sharma

=== Recurring ===
- Ram Gopal Bajaj as Sayyed Shehriyat "Miajaan" Shah Ghazi – Razia, Nadeem and Zulfar's father; Mamoon's uncle; Saltanat, Kaynaat, Humza and Neelam's grandfather; Zaroon's grand-uncle
- Melanie Nazareth as Zehnab Ashraf – Zulfar's widow; Saltanat and Kaynaat's mother; Humza, Neelam and Zaroon's aunt; Zaroon's mother-in-law; Shaira's grandmother
- Vishavpreet Kaur as Rubina Malik – Nadeem's wife; Kaynaat, Saltanat, Zaroon, Humza and Neelam's aunt; Saltanat's adoptive mother
- Jaineeraj Purohit as Nadeem Shah – Miajaan's son; Rubina's husband; Kaynaat, Saltanat, Zaroon, Humza and Neelam's uncle; Saltanat's adoptive father
- Anand Suryavanshi as Mamoon Shah – Razia, Nadeem and Zulfar's cousin; Ghazala's husband; Zaroon's father; Kaynaat, Saltanat, Humza and Neelam's uncle; Saltanat's father-in-law; Shaira's grandfather
- Kashish Duggal Paul as Ghazala – Mamoon's wife; Zaroon's mother; Kaynaat, Saltanat, Humza and Neelam's aunt; Saltanat's mother-in-law; Shaira's grandmother
- Saanvi Talwar as Rupali – Madhav's wife; Krish's mother
- Bidita Ghosh Sharma as Indu Sharma – Madhav, Sakshi and Sneha's mother; Krish's grandmother
- Nikunj Malik as Sabrina Ashraf – Zehnab's sister; Kaynaat and Saltanat's aunt
- Zaara Khan as Neelam Shah Abdalli – Razia and Junaid's daughter; Saltanat, Kaynaat and Zaroon's cousin; Humza's sister
- Kunal Khosla as Ayub Mohammed – Neelam's admirer
- Mohammed Adil as Humza Shah Abdalli – Razia and Junaid's son; Saltanat, Kaynaat and Zaroon's cousin; Neelam's brother; Kaynaat's ex-fiancé
- S Ashraf Karim as Junaid "Jaan" Shah Abdalli – Razia's widower; Miajaan's son-in-law; Neelam and Humza's father; Kaynaat, Saltanat and Zaroon's uncle

== Production ==
=== Development ===
Before its premiere, it was titled as Sufiyana Ishq but was later changed to Sufiyana Pyaar Mera. It was reported to air on Star Plus but was later shifted to Star Bharat.

=== Filming ===
Set in Delhi, the series was mainly filmed in Mumbai while some initial sequences were shot at some streets and monuments of Delhi like Humayun’s Tomb, Qutub Minar, Ring Road and Safdarjung Railway Station.

== Awards ==
Year	Award	Category	Recipient
2019	Gold Awards	Best Actor In Negative Role (Female)	Helly Shah
2019	Indian Television Academy Awards	Best Actor In Negative Role (Female)	Helly Shah
