= Qurbaan Hua =

Indian television series

- Genre: Drama
- Created by: Sonali Jaffer; Amir Jaffer
- Written by: Sameer Garud; Shilpa Jathar; Gaurav Sharma; Zaheer Shaikh
- Directed by: Sumit kumar sodani
- Creative directors: Ajay Bhardwaj; Yakshi Burathoki
- Starring: Rajveer Singh; Pratibha Ranta
- Opening theme: Qurbaan Hua
- Country of origin: India
- Original languages: Hindi; Urdu
- No. of seasons: 1
- No. of episodes: 363

Production
- Producers: Sonali Jaffer; Amir Jaffer
- Camera setup: Multi-camera
- Running time: 22 minutes
- Production company: Full House Media

Original release
- Network: Zee TV
- Release: 25 February 2020 – 17 September 2021

Qurbaan Hua (transl. sacrificed) is an Indian Hindi-language drama television series which broadcast on Zee TV and on ZEE5 before the TV telecast. It was produced by Full House Media of Sonali Jaffer and Amir Jaffer.

The show premiered on 25 February 2020 in the 10 PM timeslot and replaced Ishq Subhan Allah to another timeslot of 10:30 PM. But after the beginning of the COVID-19 pandemic, on 14 December 2020, show time slot was changed to 10:30 PM. The show replaced Ram Pyaare Sirf Hamare. 10 PM slot was allotted to Kyun Rishton Mein Katti Batti

The serial was cancelled on September 17, 2021 due to low TRP ratings.

== Plot ==
The story revolves around Neel and Chahat and their mad desire to destroy each other's families. Neelkanth "Neel" Bhatt Dhyani is a famous chef who comes from a Hindu Brahmin family. He has a hatred towards his father, the strict Vyas Ji, because he was not present when Neel's mother was on her death bed. But he loves his sister Saraswati. Chahat Rahil Baig is a happy-go-lucky girl who looks after her father, Dr Rahil Baig. Saraswati's husband, Alekh, cheats on her, which she discovers. She goes to the hospital of Chahat's father and dies on the operation table. Alekh blames Rahil Baig, and thus Neel starts to hate him and Chahat. Rahil suddenly disappears, and Chahat vows to find him. She and Neel have a fake marriage and stay in Neel's house. Since Vyas Ji hates Muslims, Neel tells him that Chahat is Hindu, just like him, and they both hide this fact from the family members.

Now both Neel and Chahat want to find Dr Baig for different reasons. Neel wants to send Rahil to jail for killing his sister, and Chahat wants to find and send her father out of the city to save him from Neel. Moreover, the duo faces problems created by Alekh, Godambari (Neel's aunt) and Naveli (Neel's cousin-sister). While creating so, Neel and Chahat come closer to each other, and they forget their enmity. Soon, they come across Gazala Rahil Baig, Chahat's stepmother. She is cruel and wicked and has been holding Rahil hostage. Chahat tries to take her father from her but fails. Neel also joins in her quest. Soon, Neel faces an accident and is presumed dead, leaving Chahat heartbroken. To make matters worse, Alekh decides to marry her. But on the marriage day, a stranger arrives, claiming to be Neel. The stranger's face has many stitches, and only Chahat refuses to believe that he is Neel. Soon, the new Neel gains everyone including Vyas Ji's trust that he is Neel. Chahat is happy to be with Neel, and they fall in love. Later, Neel finds Chahat's father and presents him to her. But instead of being happy, she scolds him and tells Neel that he is behind Neel's accident and shows him the video. Later, fearing that Chahat's Muslim identity will be exposed, Neel asks her to leave him. Heartbroken, Chahat leaves Neel and comes across Kashmira, Neel's girlfriend. She becomes trouble for Neel and Chahat and tries to expose Chahat to get Neel back. Later, Kashmira kidnaps Chahat and calls Neel to an unknown place. Neel goes there and finds Chahat in an unconscious state and tries to wake her up. Soon, Chahat reveals to Neel that it was her and Kashmira's plan to make him return to her.

Later, everyone in Neel's house learns that Chahat is a Muslim. Gazala takes Chahat away and plans to marry Rehmat, an older man, who tells her that he would help in her political career, whereas Vyas Ji decides to have Neel marry Kashmira. At Chahat's wedding, Neel escapes and tries to stop it but is beaten up by Gazala's goons and left to die but is saved by some men. Elsewhere, Chahat pretends to have consumed poison. Zubeida Baig, Chahat's Badi Ammi (paternal grandmother), comes. She plans to stay there till Chahat gets married, unaware of Gazala's evil intentions. On her father's telling, Chahat decides to run away but is stopped by Neel, disguised as a Muslim man. He introduces himself as Qasim, and Zubeida gives him the job of Chahat's bodyguard. Later they marry, but Vyas Ji refuses to accept Chahat as his daughter-in-law. The rest of the story goes to show as to whether Vyas Ji will accept Chahat or continue troubling her and Neel.

Chahat becomes pregnant with Neel's child. She wears a bomb coat and falls in the river to make Neel believe she died. After months, Neel sees Chahat in labour and thinks she deceived him as he sees Sahil calling himself Chahat's husband. Actually, Sahil saved Chahat, and he stayed all these months with Chahat during her pregnancy. Chahat is rushed to the hospital and gives birth to twins - a girl and a boy. Neel takes the newborn boy when he sees Sahil selling the baby to someone.

7 years later

Neel stays with his son Shlok and Chahat with her daughter Dua. Shlok is religious and kind-hearted but naive, Dua is mischievous, bold and caring. Chahat and Neel both arrive with Dua and Shlok, respectively, for a tournament in Shimla. Shlok and Chahat meet and form a friendly bond. And eventually, Shlok starts to consider Chahat his mother, calling her masi, whereas Neel and Dua meet and dislike each other. Chahat meets Vyas Ji in a disabling mental condition and decides to learn the truth about the latter's condition. During a race, Alaknanda makes Dua fall and let Shlok win, but Dua discovers this and hides in the car with Neel to Devprayag.

== Cast ==
=== Main ===
- Karan Jotwani (before plastic surgery) / Rajveer Singh (after plastic surgery) as Neelkanth "Neel" Bhatt Dhyani: Vyasji's son; Saraswati's brother; Naveli's cousin; Chahat's husband; Shlok and Dua's father (2020–2021)
- Pratibha Ranta as Chahat Baig Bhatt Dhyani: Rahil and Zeenat's daughter; Gazala's step-daughter; Akram's step-sister; Neel's wife; Shlok and Dua's mother (2020–2021)
- Vidhaan Sharma as Shlok Bhatt Dhyani: Neel and Chahat's son; Dua's twin brother; Kripa's cousin (2021)
- Kisha Arora as Dua Bhatt Dhyani: Neel and Chahat's daughter; Shlok's twin sister; Kripa's cousin (2021)

=== Recurring ===
- Sonali Nikam as Saraswati Bhatt Dhyani Nautiyal: Vyasji's daughter; Neel's sister; Naveli's cousin; Alekh's wife; Kripa's mother. (2020) (Dead)
- Nishad Vaidya as Alekh Nautiyal: Saraswati's widower; Kripa's father; Naveli's ex-husband (2020–2021)
- Parakh Madan as Gazala Baig: Rahil's second wife; Akram's mother; Chahat's step-mother; Shlok and Dua's step-grandmother. (2020–2021)
- Shrey Pareek as Sahil: Chahat's former friend; Dua's foster father (2020–2021) (Dead)
- Aayam Mehta as
  - Madhavanand "Vyasji" Bhatt Dhyani: Agam and Jamunaprasad's brother; Saraswati and Neel's father; Kripa, Shlok and Dua's grandfather. (2020–2021)
  - Agam Bhatt Dhyani: Madhavanand and Jamunaprasad's brother. (2021)
- Nitin Bhasin as Jamunaprasad Bhatt Dhyani: Madhavanand and Agam's brother; Godambhari's husband; Naveli's father (2020–2021)
- Neelam Pathania as Godambhari Bhatt Dhyani: Jamunaprasad's wife; Naveli's mother (2020–2021)
- Alisha Parveen Khan as Naveli Bhatt Dhyani: Jamunaprasad and Godambhari's daughter; Neel and Saraswati's cousin; Alekh's ex-wife; Bhupendra's wife (2020–2021)
- MD Patel as Bhupendra: Neel's friend; Naveli's second husband. (2020–2021)
- Sanjay Gurbaxani as Dr. Rahil Baig: Zubeida's son; Zeenat's widower; Gazala's husband; Chahat's father; Akram's step-father; Shlok and Dua's grandfather (2020-2021) (Dead)
- Unknown as Zeenat Baig: Rahil's first wife; Chahat's mother; Shlok and Dua's grandmother (2020) (Dead)
- Muhammed Lunat as Akram Baig: Gazala's son; Rahil's step-son; Chahat's step-brother (2020)
- Mamta Luthra as Zubeida Baig: Rahil's mother; Chahat's grandmother; Akram's step-grandmother; Shlok and Dua's great-grandmother (2021)
- Tanya Sharma as Kashmira "Mira" Awashti: Neel's ex-girlfriend (2020–2021)
- Sapna Devalkar as Alaknanda: Chahat's namesake sister; Shlok's foster mother; Neel's ex-fiancée (2021)
- Akhil Akkineni as Alaknanda's friend (2021)
- Devtosh Mukherjee as Nikhil Khurana (2020-2021)
- Bellamkonda Sreenivas as Vijay (2021)
- Ayaz Ahmed as Zain Siddiqui (2021)

== Production ==
The production and airing of the show was halted indefinitely in late March 2020 due to the COVID-19 outbreak in India. Because of the outbreak, the filming of television series and films was halted on 19 March 2020 and expected to resume on 1 April 2020 and the series was last broadcast on 20 March 2020 when the remaining episodes were aired. The filming resumed on 28 June 2020 and airing to resume on 14 July 2020.

In August 2021, Zee Entertainment Enterprises Limited aired the promo of the show on Zee Anmol and announced the date of its Re-run on Zee Anmol. The show get 8pm slot from 17 August 2021. The show will air under title of Tera Mera Nata Koii.
