= Sukhpur =

- village
- Location in Bihar, India Sukhpur (India)
- Coordinates: 26°03′N 86°32′E
- Country: India
- State: Bihar
- District: Supaul

Languages
  - Official: Maithili, Hindi
- Time zone: UTC+5:30 (IST)
- PIN: 852130
- Telephone code: 06473
- Vehicle registration: BR-50
- Coastline: 0 kilometres (0 mi)
- Nearest city: Supaul
- Lok Sabha constituency: Supaul

Sukhpur is a village in North Bihar.

Sukhpur has fertile alluvial soil, as it lies in the plain of Koshi. Climate of village is mild and monsoon type. Summer is less hot compared to northern India, mainly due to its proximity to the eastern Himalayas but temperature goes down to as cold as 8C during Winter. Rain is mainly concentrated from May to September. The village receives more than 250 cm of rain per year. Sukhpur is also flood prone due to the shifting nature of the Koshi River; however, the village has not yet seen flood water beyond its outskirts.

In terms of amenties, Sukhpur has a market, banks, schools, and a primary health care facility. The village's schools enroll students from many surrounding villages.

Sukhpur is the site of the Tilheswar Sthan Temple, dedicated to Lord Shiva. The temple attracts regular visitors of pilgrims from all the surrounding areas. A Devi Mandir (Maiyaa Ghar), located in Bhadarpatti Tola, is also a place of worship. The village also celebrates the Dussehra Celebration

Most of the villagers are engaged in cultivation. On average three crops are taken per year from the same piece of land. Major crops include Paddy, wheat moong, corn, mango, and litchi. Three major land portions, "Lalbagh," "Kalibagh," and "Mamabagh," are occupied by mango trees.

The main religions observed by villagers are Hinduism and Islam.

Sukhpur is linked to Supaul and Saharsa town of the region by road. Neighboring villages are Parsarma, Parsoni, Bero, Malhni, Balha, Solhni, Karanpur and Nawhatta.
