= Kitani Mohabbat Hai =

- Genre: Romantic Drama
- Created by: Ekta Kapoor
- Screenplay by: Fatima Rangila; Vandana Tewari; Dialogues; Rekkha Modi; Mukul Shrivastava
- Story by: Sonali Jaffar
- Directed by: Anil V. Kumar; Sangieta Rao; Fahad Kashmiri; Mujammil Desai; Anoop Choudhary; V.G Roy
- Creative directors: Vikas Gupta; Sanchi Bawa; Sandiip Sikcand; Prashant Bhatt
- Starring: See below
- Opening theme: "Kitani Mohabbat Hai" by Aishwarya Nigam and Manjera Ganguly
- Country of origin: India
- Original language: Hindi
- No. of seasons: 1
- No. of episodes: 170

Production
- Producers: Ekta Kapoor; Shobha Kapoor
- Cinematography: Veerdhaval Purnaik; Deepak Malwankar; Balu Dahifale; Ashish Sharma
- Editors: Vikas Sharma; Sandeep Bhatt
- Running time: 24 minutes
- Production company: Balaji Telefilms

Original release
- Network: NDTV Imagine
- Release: 19 January – 25 September 2009

Related
- Kitani Mohabbat Hai 2

Kitani Mohabbat Hai (How Much I Love You) is an Indian soap opera which aired on Imagine TV from 19 January 2009 to 25 September 2009. Kitani Mohabbat Hai 2 started airing on 1 November 2010. Season 2 is not a continuation; it stars the same leads in a different story.

Season 1 was launched at Krishna Cottage in Mumbai days before the premiere.

== Plot ==
This tale of pure love begins as Arjun, the son of business tycoon DK Punj, is shown confined in a jail. He refuses to seek his release on bail. Ganga Rai, a young lawyer, is determined to find his story out. Arjun emotionally reveals the past.

Arjun meets and falls in love with Aarohi Sharma, a simple aspiring singer from Shimla. Her father Hariprasad runs a Gurukul, her widowed sister-in-law Purvi, and her sisters are Antara and Sur. As Hariprasad retires, Aarohi is assigned as Arjun's associate to support her family. Materialistic and arrogant, Arjun doesn't treat her well, as being the son of a separated couple, he hates his mother and so all women. Aarohi continues to stand up to him, which attracts Arjun and softens his heart towards her, and they gradually develop feelings for each other.

Meanwhile, their ties are strengthened as Salil Mittal, Arjun's best friend and the son of D K Punj's business partner, whose family live with the Punjs, falls in love with Purvi and marries her against his family's wishes.

During this, Arjun finds out that Aarohi's mentor and mother figure is his mother, Savita, who abandoned him in childhood. He feels betrayed by Aarohi as he believes that she is plotting with his mother to break his heart. As a result, he breaks off their alliance, only to find out it was his father's fault that his parents separated. During the time that he is unaware of the truth, he constantly taunts and insults Aarohi and makes her feel worthless. After Savita tells Arjun the truth, he wishes to reconcile with Aarohi, but they meet in an accident.

After recovery, Aarohi goes to Mumbai to pursue her music career. Arjun also, leaves his wealth and his family behind to support Aarohi in her new journey. He protects her in Mumbai and clears her path whereas Aarohi feels like he is there to ruin her opportunities. Aarohi soon meets Karan. Her family supports her relationship with Karan, but she still loves Arjun. After an incident in which Arjun rescues Aarohi from a building which caught fire, the two reconcile and are finally happy again. However, this doesn’t last long.

Arjun’s father, D K Punj, scared of having another middle-class "greedy" woman in a wealthy family, reveals to Aarohi that Arjun is adopted and blackmails her with this long-kept secret to leave Arjun. Aarohi thus accepts Karan's proposal to marry her to protect Arjun from the “truth.” When Arjun finds this out, he kidnaps Aarohi from her wedding venue, and her family rushes to rescue her. Her father falls from the terrace and dies in the scuffle, and Arjun is blamed and arrested for his murder.

As Arjun finishes his narration, the show leaps to the present, and Ganga Rai begins to try proving him innocent to prevent his hanging. She finds Aarohi, who is now a famous singer who goes by “Akshita Hariprasad”, and asks her to help Arjun, but she refuses. Meanwhile, Salil's mother, Padmalakshmi Mittal, has footage of that night and accidentally misplaces it in some packages. Aarohi receives the CD, which proves Arjun's innocence and rushes to save Arjun, and is successful, but unfortunately does not meet him.

Both of them leave for Shimla, where they first met, and wish to retire there from a life of chaos. As Aarohi runs towards the train, Arjun reaches his hand out to her, like the first time they met, and they unite. The last scene shows them marrying happily ever after.

== Cast ==
=== Main ===
- Karan Kundrra as Arjun Punj
- Kritika Kamra as Aarohi Sharma

=== Recurring ===
- Hiten Tejwani as Karan Singh
- Rakshanda Khan as Ganga Rai
- Satyajit Sharma as Darshan Kumar "DK" Punj
- Papiya Sengupta/Neena Gupta as Savita Punj
- Veerendra Saxena as Hari Prasad Sharma
- Shresth Kumar as Salil Mittal
- Pooja Gor as Purvi Sharma / Purvi Mittal
- Akshita Kapoor as Antara Sharma
- Sonam Mann as Sur Sharma
- Nitin Chatterjee as Jayesh Mehta
- Sheeba Chadha as Padmalakshmi Mittal
- Mihika Verma as Natasha Mittal
- Sudha Shivpuri as Bua
- Mrinal Dutt as Aman Mittal
- Ayaz Ahmed as Abhay
- Irfan Razaa Khan as Vikas Gupta
- Priya Bathija as Mallika

== Sequel ==
A new season was started soon after titled Kitani Mohabbat Hai 2.
