= Code Red (Indian TV series) =

2015 Indian television series

- Also known as: Code Red Chakravyuh; Code Red Umeed; Code Red Awaaz; Code Red Talaash
- Genre: Anthology series Supernatural
- Created by: Anshuman Kishore Singh
- Written by: Sanjeev K Jha; Koel Chaudhuri
- Directed by: Anshuman Kishore Singh; Ajay Veermal; Vivek Kumar
- Creative director: Vikas Gupta
- Presented by: Sakshi Tanwar; Anita Hassanandani; Shaleen Malhotra; Paridhi Sharma
- Country of origin: India
- Original language: Hindi
- No. of seasons: 1
- No. of episodes: 214

Production
- Producers: Sanjiv Sharma; Vipul D. Shah; Praver Awal; Anup Soni
- Production locations: Mumbai, Maharashtra, India
- Camera setup: Multi-camera
- Production companies: Optimystix Entertainment; Endemol India; Sunshine Rise Productions; Lost Boy Productions

Original release
- Network: Colors TV
- Release: 14 January – 2 October 2015

Code Red (also known as Code Red Chakravyuh, Code Red Umeed, Code Red Awaaz, Code Red Talaash) is an Indian television crime show, which had a premiere on Colors TV on 19 January 2015. The show was hosted by Sakshi Tanwar.

Code Red Talaash is an Indian supernatural television sub-series of Code Red, which airs on Colors TV. The series premiered on 22 April 2015 on Wednesday and airs Wednesday thorough Friday nights for an hour. The series showcases real life stories in view of super common forces. The sub-series shows some of the most popular paranormal occurrences in India and narrates the untold story behind every supernatural incidence. The show is hosted by Anita Hassanandani and Shaleen Malhotra.

The series is a part of Code Red that airs on Colors TV and explores the myths behind various haunted places in India.

== Cast ==
=== Host ===
- Anita Hassanandani as Host
- Paridhi Sharma as Host
- Sakshi Tanwar as Host
- Shaleen Malhotra as Host

=== Episodic role ===
- Ankit Bhardwaj as News anchor
- Akshamma Singh as Aashima
- Mahima Makwana as Riya
- Jatin Shah as Rishabh
- Manish Choudhary as Dr. Prashant Bhaskar
- Megha Gupta as Bindiya
- Mona Singh as Pragya
- Anup Soni as Rajeev
- Karmveer Choudhary as Villain
- Asha Negi as Saraswati
- Shilpa Saklani as Ganga
- Shweta Kanoje as Pratibha
- Yash Sinha as Kabir
- Adaa Khan as Zarina/Aafreen Murtaza
- Ssumier Pasricha as Shubroto/Supriya
- Ashish Dixit as Saurabh
- Jannat Zubair Rahmani as Simran/Surili
- Saurabh Pandey as Munna Yadav
- Geetanjali Mishra as Jyoti/Nisha
- Yashashri Masurkar as Poonam
- Nishad Vaidya as Govind
- Neetha Shetty as Priyanka
- Rucha Gujarathi as Neha
- Dalljiet Kaur as Scarlett
- Anupriya Kapoor as Jennifer
- Ahsaas Channa as Sarika
- Aditya Kapadia as Cameo
- Shahab Khan as Various characters
- Priya Shinde
- Aishwarya Sharma
- Shiju Kataria
- Rahul Verma Rajput
- Rakesh Kukreti
- Bhavesh Balchandani
- Urvashi Dholakia
- Yash Goyal
- Pooran Kiri
- Kanishka Soni
- Anju Mahendru
- Richa Soni
- Kanwar Dhillon
- Ayush Shah
- Khushank Arora
- Meghna Aditya
- Gaurav Bajaj
- Jayashree Venketaramanan
- Rushad Rana
- Bhavana Pani
- Deepna Kumar
- Supriya Kumari
- Mohit Shrivastava
- Pankaj Vishnu
- Kiran Janjani
- Neha Bamb
- Pooja Welling
