= Gaurav Bajaj =

Indian film actor

- Born: Gaurav Bajaj; 6 April 1997 (age 28)
- Occupation(s): Actor, model

Gaurav Bajaj is an Indian film actor and model. He was born on 6 April 1997. He has appeared in commercials and in movies such as Phir Kabhi, Dahek: A Restless Mind, Kirkit , Vroom and Balika Vadhu.

== Filmography ==
=== Television ===
| Year | Title | Character name | Role |
|---|---|---|---|
| 2013 | Yeh Hai Aashiqui - season 1 (spisode 2: "Tip Tip Barsa Pyaar") | Vinay | Lead role |
