= Choksey =

Choksey is a surname. Notable people with the surname include:

- Shubhaavi Choksey, Indian television actress
- Sudhin Choksey (born 1954), Indian banking executive
- Champaklal Choksey, co-founder of Asian Paints
