= Mere Jeevan Saathi =

Mere Jeevan Saathi (Hindi for My Life Partner) is the title of two Hindi films

- Mere Jeevan Saathi (1972 film), starring Rajesh Khanna
- Mere Jeevan Saathi (2006 film), starring Akshay Kumar

== See also ==
- Jeevan Saathi, an Indian television series
- Jeevan Sathi, a 1962 Ollywood / Oriya film directed by Prabhat Mukherjee
