= Zama Habib =

Indian screenwriter

- Occupations: Director, Screenwriter, Producer
- Years active: 1994–present
- Spouse: Ishrat Ara
- Children: Aamna Habib (Daughter), Saarim Habib (Son)

Zama Habib (born as Mohammed Badiuzzaman), also known as Zaman Habib, is a Mumbai-based Indian television writer and lyricist. He has written serials such as Sasural Genda Phool, , Nimki Mukhiya, Nimki Vidhayak, Ishaaron Ishaaron Mein, Sapna Babul Ka...Bidaai, Ek Hazaaron Mein Meri Behna Hai, and Saas Bina Sasural. Currently he is writing Yeh Rishta Kya Kehlata Hai. He is the script consultant of Anupamaa.

== Early life and background ==
Zama Habib hails from Ijra Madhubani District, Bihar but he spent his childhood in Kolkata (then Calcutta) West Bengal. He did his schooling from the Presidency Muslim High School, Calcutta and after completing his intermediate from Maulana Azad College, Calcutta he came to Aligarh Muslim University to pursue his higher education. He did his BA (Hons) and MA in English literature from Aligarh Muslim University.

He was involved in theater in his college days and wrote, acted and directed several plays. His first play Batwara (based on Saadat Hasan Manto's famous short story "Toba Tek Singh") was staged in 1988 in Kala Mandir, Calcutta. Other notable plays he wrote are Janta Express and Chaddi Pahan Ke Phool Khila Hai. He has also translated plays by Anton Chekhov and other writers. His collection of translated plays in Urdu called Aadhi Raat Ka Suraj was published in 1992. He is a well known young poet of Urdu Literature and his poetry appears in leading Urdu literary magazines.

== Career ==
In 1993, he left his research halfway and came to Delhi. Soon he became a radio artist and wrote and acted in many radio plays and serials. He anchored/presented few popular programs (Zero Hour, Adaab Arz Hai and Only For Broken Hearts) on AIR FM as radio jockey as well. And then after spending few years in Delhi he came to Mumbai where initially he got lot of encouragement and appreciation from actor, director Sachin Pilgaonkar. He has written more than 5,000 episodes of Hindi and Bengali serials.

Along with writing serials he has also co-produced with Ravi Ojha serials like Sasural Genda Phool and Sajda Tere Pyaar Mein. In 2016, he founded his own company Qissago Telefilms LLP and produced two shows Nimki Mukhiya For Star Bharat and Ishaaron Ishaaron Mein For Sony Entertainment. Nimki Mukhiya has second season as Nimki Vidhayak which was launched on 12 August 2019.

He has also produced, written, directed a short film, The Family that has been selected for many film festivals.

Between 2014 and 2018, Zama Habib has also served as Joint Secretary and later as Hony General Secretary of Screenwriters Association (SWA). After a gap of two years, he once again has been elected as honorary General Secretary of Screenwriters Association (SWA) for 2021–2023.

== Lyrics ==
He has also penned lyrics/title songs for the serials like Maamla Gadbad Hai, Zindagi Milke Bitaayenge, Ek Hazaaron Mein Meri Behna Hai, Sajda Tere Pyaar Mein, Ishaaron Ishaaron Mein and more. Recently, he has penned the Title Song of his latest project, Zindagi Mere Ghar Aana.

== Qissago Telefilms ==
In 2016, Zama Habib opened his own production house called Qissago Telefilms LLP with his wife and partner, Ishrat Ara and produced shows, Nimki Mukhiya, Nimki Vidhayak, Ishaaron Ishaaron Mein and Zindagi Mere Ghar Aana.

=== Shows by Qissago Telefilms ===
Release	Show	Episodes	Cast	Channel
28 August 2017 – 10 August 2019	Nimki Mukhiya	598	Bhumika Gurung; Abhishek Sharma	Star Bharat; Hotstar
12 August 2019 – 1 February 2020	Nimki Vidhayak	152	Bhumika Gurung; Abhishek Sharma	Star Bharat; Hotstar
15 July 2019 – 31 March 2020	Ishaaron Ishaaron Mein	187	Mudit Nayar; Simran Pareenja; Debattama Saha	Sony Entertainment Television; SonyLIV
26 July 2021 – 1 January 2022	Zindagi Mere Ghar Aana	138	Esha Kansara; Hasan Zaidi	StarPlus; Hotstar

== Awards ==
Zama Habib has received several awards and honours for his work as a writer and producer in Indian television. As a producer, he received recognition for television series including Sasural Genda Phool and Nimki Mukhiya. As a writer and lyricist, he received the Best Lyrics award at the Screenwriters Association Awards (SWA Awards) in 2020 for the song “Ek Chup Tum Ek Chup Main” from Ishaaron Ishaaron Mein. In 2022, he received the SWA Award for Best Lyrics for the title song “Achar Ka Dabba Zindagi” from Zindagi Mere Ghar Aana. In 2023, he received the Best Story award at the Indian Television Academy Awards for Yeh Rishta Kya Kehlata Hai. He was also honoured with the International Iconic Best Writer of Indian Television award in 2023 for his work on Yeh Rishta Kya Kehlata Hai.

== Television ==
=== As writer ===
- Baatein Kuch Ankahee Si (2023) (Script Consultant)
- Yeh Rishta Kya Kehlata Hai (2016–present)
- Anupamaa (2020–present) (Script Consultant)
- Woh Toh Hai Albelaa (2022–2023) (Script Consultant)
- Zindagi Mere Ghar Aana (2021–2022)
- Nimki Vidhayak (2019–2020)
- Ishaaron Ishaaron Mein (2019–2020)
- Yeh Rishtey Hain Pyaar Ke (2019–2020) (Script Consultant)
- Nimki Mukhiya (2017–2019)
- Ek Rishta Saajhedari Ka (2016)
- Dil Ki Baatein Dil Hi Jaane (2015)
- Dilli Wali Thakur Gurls (2015)
- Gangaa (2015)
- Muh Boli Shaadi (2015)
- Tum Saath Ho Jab Apne (2014)
- Ek Nanad Ki Khushiyon Ki Chaabi...Meri Bhabhi (2013–2014)
- Do Dil Bandhe Ek Dori Se (2013–2014)
- Kaisa Yeh Ishq Hai... Ajab Sa Risk Hai (2013)
- Pyaar Ka Dard Hai Meetha Meetha Pyaara Pyaara (2012)
- Saas Bina Sasural (2010–2012)
- Ek Hazaaron Mein Meri Behna Hai (2011)
- Sasural Genda Phool (2010–2012)
- Sapna Babul Ka...Bidaai (2007–2010)
- Do Hanson Ka Jodaa (2010)
- Badalte Rishton Ki Dastaan (2013)
- Jamuna Paar
- Lo Ho Gayi Pooja Iss Ghar Ki
- Pyaar Ke Do Naam: Ek Raadha, Ek Shyaam
- Ek Tukda Chaand Ka
- Ek Ladki Anjaani Si
- Jeevan Saathi
- Maat Pitaah Ke Charnon Mein Swarg
- Phir Bhi
- Woh Hue Na Hamaare
- Maamla Gadbad Hai
- Zindagi Milke Bitaayenge Directed by Raj N. Sippy
- Jaal (Telefilm), Directed by Raj N. Sippy
- Gilli Danda Directed by Sachin Pilgaonkar
- Ajeeb Daastan
- Har Mod Par
- Ek Do Teen Directed by Sachin Pilgaonkar
- Khela (Bengali)
- Neer Bhanga Jhor (Bengali)
- Ogo Bodhu Sundari (Bengali)

=== Productions ===
- Zindagi Mere Ghar Aana (2021)
- Nimki Vidhayak (2019)
- Ishaaron Ishaaron Mein (2019)
- Nimki Mukhiya (2017)
- Sasural Genda Phool (2010–2012)
- Sajda Tere Pyaar Mein (2012)
- The Family (Short Film) (2013)
- Dear Men (2025 Short Film)

=== Director ===
- The Family (Short Film) (2013)
