= Take It Easy (2015 film) =

2015 film by Sunil Prem Vyas

- Directed by: Sunil Prem Vyas
- Written by: Sunil Prem Vyas
- Story by: Sunil Prem Vyas
- Produced by: Dharmesh Pandit
- Starring: Vikram Gokhale; Dipannita Sharma; Raj Zutshi; Anang Desai; Joy Sengupta; Sulbha Arya; Supriya Karnik
- Production company: Prince Productions
- Distributed by: Hash Entertainment
- Release date: 2 January 2015
- Country: India
- Language: Hindi

Take It Easy is a 2015 Hindi children's film written and directed by Sunil Prem Vyas and produced by Dharmesh Pandit. The film is starring Vikram Gokhale, Raj Zutshi, Supriya Karnik, Dipannita Sharma and Anang Desai.

== Cast ==
- Vikram Gokhale
- Dipannita Sharma
- Raj Zutshi
- Anang Desai
- Joy Sengupta
- Sulbha Arya
- Arun Behl
- Vijay Kashyap
- Supriya Karnik
- Jyoti Gauba
- Yash Ghanekar
- Prasad Reddy
- Smera Jadhav

== Soundtrack ==
No.	Title	Singer(s)	Length
1.	"Maa Sunn Le Zara"	Sonu Nigam	7:05
2.	"Mushkil Hai – Male"	Shankar Mahadevan
3.	"Mushkil Hai – Female"	Supriya Thakkur
4.	"O Kaat"	Javed Ali, Supriya Thakkur, Sneha Pant
5.	"Tu Bechaara Mei Bechaara"	Shivam Mahadevan, Shubh Sandeep
6.	"Nanhe Se (Theme Song)"	Jatinder Singh
7.	"Background Theme Score"	Papply - Priya
8.	"Take It Easy Yaar"	Shubh Sandeep, Ratnakar Kamble

== Critical reception ==
Shubhra Gupta of The Indian Express gave it 1.5/5 stars, stating,

With some easy moments, this film could have been easier to watch, but not when there is no break from loud background music, loud melodrama, and loud dialogues. Even the children, who all try hard to be as natural as possible, are weighed down under all the preachiness.

Renuka Vyavahare of The Times of India gave it 2/5 stars and opined,

Their message of how 'everything is judged on the basis of money than character today' comes across clearly. However, the execution could have been crisper, more authentic. The story keeps beating around the bush for no reason, when the impact has already been made. The dramatization is uncalled for, especially towards the end. What could have been an otherwise heartrending climax, gets faltered when stretched for no rhyme or reason. Why beg for tears?"

Webduniya gave it 2/5 stars. Shakti Shetty of Mid-day gave it 3/5 stars and opined,

On the big screen, both Yash Ghanekar as well as Prasad Reddy put in a fine performance as rivals-turned-BFFs. Their more seasoned colleagues are remarkable but still, the story revolves around the two. They are the undisputed stars. Last year hardly witnessed a memorable children's film. With this venture, one can now expect many more from 2015.
