= Nimki Mukhiya =

Indian Hindi-language television serial

- Genre: Drama; Social issue
- Created by: Zama Habib
- Written by: Zama Habib
- Directed by: Rakesh Kumar Inder Das
- Creative director: Manjari Mukul
- Starring: Bhumika Gurung; Abhishek Sharma
- Country of origin: India
- Original language: Hindi
- No. of seasons: 1
- No. of episodes: 598

Production
- Producers: Zama Habib; Ishrat Ara
- Editor: Masih Habib
- Camera setup: Multi-camera
- Running time: 20–22 minutes
- Production company: Qissago Telefilms LLP

Original release
- Network: Star Bharat
- Release: 28 August 2017 – 10 August 2019

Related
- Nimki Vidhayak

Nimki Mukhiya is an Indian drama television which premiered on 28 August 2017 on Star Bharat. Produced by Zama Habib, it stars Bhumika Gurung Malhotra and Abhishek Sharma.

== Plot ==
The story, set in a small village in Bihar, deals with the life of Nimki, a carefree, materialistic girl who accidentally becomes the Mukhiya (chief) of the village. Nimki is mad about cinema, a dreamer and unaware of the darkness of the world. Tetar singh father of Babbu is obsessed with power so he convinces Nimki that babbu is in love with Nimki. Nimki loves Babbu and she believes that Babbu loves her, too.

After becoming chief of the village, Nimki is married to Babbu Singh, son of Tetar Singh, former chief of the village. Tetar's intention to make Nimki his daughter-in-law is to fulfill his political ambitions but no one in Babbu's family accepts Nimki. They housed her in a maid's room and treated her like one. But Nimki believed that Tetar's family will love her one day. After many incidents Sweety, Babbu's sister befriends her. Meanwhile, Sweety falls in love with BDO Abhimanyu Rai. But Abhimanyu loved Nimki secretly and he could not express his love and agrees to marry Sweety, who has just divorced her cheating husband, Rituraj.

Tetar did not favour this and planned against Nimki. Babbu shoots Sweety to stop her marriage with Abhimanyu. Sweety realises Abhimanyu's feelings for Nimki and hence decides to leave him and remarries Rituraj, when Rituraj learns why Sweety marries him, he blackmails and rapes Sweety. Tunney is aware that Rituraj rapes Sweety daily, but keeps mum to reunite Ahimanyu and Nimki. Nimki realises that she never loves Babbu, it was just attraction rather she started loving Abhimanyu.

She organises a fashion show in the village to raise funds for development, but Tetar and Babbu are opposed. Before the beginning of the fashion show Tetar Singh tries to stop it and the villagers insult him. To avenge his father's insult, during the fashion show Babbu rapes Nimki. Nimki overcomes her sorrow and again lives her normal life. She doesn't change her attitude or her swag. Nimki takes Babbu to court on rape charges, but Babbu kidnaps Elina to blackmail Tunney into giving fake proof against Nimki in court. She still tries to get him punished, but he is declared innocent. She then learns of her pregnancy.

Babbu saves his sister Sweety from being raped by Rituraj, then realises his mistake and asks Nimki's forgiveness. He reforms and pleads with her to give their marriage a second chance. Seeing his changed behaviour, she forgives him and moves back into the mansion with him upsetting her family members. Nimki decides to support Babbu to teach him lesson for his wrongdoing but she doesn't want to involve her family members in this fight therefore she maintains a distance from them, further disappointing them. Mahua is angry on her and doesn't allow her to meet sick Monu. She asks Nimki to choose between her and Babbu and Nimki chooses Babbu as he is the father of her unborn child. To harm Babbu, Mahua throws a brick at Babbu but Nimki comes in between and the brick hits her abdomen. After realising Nimki's support for him, Babbu decides to support her and chooses her over his family as she, too, chose him over her own family.

To free Sweety from Rituraaj, Nimki suggests to Babbu to contest the election. Tetar Singh becomes angry that his own son challenges him in the election. Both parties gain the voters' trust. One such day, Monu comes to Haveli to meet Nimki after learning that Nimki visits Ghattola. Nimki slaps Anaro when she insults Monu. Nimki tries every way to break every pillar of Haveli. Nimki Babbu shares some lovey-dovey moments while talking to their unborn. Tunney has little understanding towards Nimki's plan and he along with Abhimanyu secretly support Nimki.

Tater Singh holds a rally in the village, where he bridges himself with praise. He tells Nimki's sister Mahuaa to speak out against Nimki and Babbu. Rituraj rebuked Sweety for her condition after Tetar Singh wins the election. Just then, Sweety tells the crowd of villagers not to vote for Tater Singh and that he is not fit to be called a human and beats Rituraaj in front of everyone. Tater Singh's rally is spoiled.

After some time Babbu goes to Nimki's house and she tells us how much Nimki loves her sister Mahuaa and all the family members. Mahuaa and everyone else agree that Babbu has improved and all are happy as before. Babbu arrives at the mansion to take Nimki to reunite him with his family. In Babbu's absence, Tetar and Rituraj tangle with Sweety and Nimki and knock Nimki down on the stomach. Annaro Devi is also there, severely deteriorating Nimki's condition. Tetar Singh realises that Nimki's condition is critical. To eliminate Babbu from MLA position, Tetar makes his wife Annaro Devi a pawn and knocks her down the stairs while Rekha (Dabloo's wife) is watching. Now Diamond is also with Nimki. When the police arrive, Anaro Devi gives testimony against Babbu. She holds Babbu responsible for her and Nimki's accident. Nimki loses her child, enraging Babbu. Nimki and Babbu decide to punish everyone who is responsible for death of his unborn child.

A fight ensures between Babu and Tetar Singh. Anaro and Diamond also arrive. Nimki goes missing, Tunney, Abhimanyu and Sweety search for her. Meanwhile, Anaro tries to stop Babbu and Tetar Singh's fight. On the way, Abhimanyu and Sweety's car collides with a tree. Abhimanyu is hit on the head, seeing Sweety's care and love for him, Abhimanyu chooses Sweety over Nimki. Nimki arrives there and reveals to Tetar Singh and others that it was on Rituraaj's suggestion, not hers, that Babbu decided to contest the election, therefore he begs Nimki. She then shows a recorded video in which Rituraaj suggested to Babbu to accept Nimki as it was the only way to win the MLA seat and go against his own family. The more he defied his family, the more voters trusted him and his chances of him winning the MLA election would increase. Tetar knocks down Babbu, Anaro doesn't believe this and after giving her testimony against Tetar Singh she goes insane. Nimki approaches Babbu and says that she knew he has not changed Babbu Singh and that he resembles his father and that even were Babbu to change, she would not forgive him, and that she is an example for those who are unable to act for fear of being raped. She labelled him a rapist and said that she would never forgive him. The police then arrest Tetar Singh. While leaving, Tetar Singh kills Rituraj with a stone. Anaro Devi cannot believe that her son has died. Nimki remembers all the previous things but she wears her glasses to hide her pain and walks away.

== Cast ==
=== Main ===
- Bhumika Gurung Malhotra as Namkeen "Nimki" Singh (née Kumari) - the village's first female Mukhiya, Rambachan's eldest daughter, Mahua and Monu's sister, Babbu Singh's widow, Abhimannyu's love interest
- Indraneil Sengupta as Abhimannyu Rai a.k.a. BDO Babu - Elena's father, Sweety and Nimki's love interest
- Abhishek Sharma as Babbu Singh - Nimki's husband(Dead); Tetar and Anaro's second son; Dabloo, Sweety and Diamond's brother

=== Recurring ===
- Priyanshu Singh as Tunney - Nimki's friend, Mahua's love interest
- Ankit Sagar as Rambachan - Nimki, Mahua and Monu's father
- Saniya Noorain as Mahua Kumari - Rambachan's second daughter, Nimki and Monu's sister, Tunney's love interest
- Arafat Shaikh as Monu - Rambachan's son, Nimki and Mahua's younger brother
- Shriya Jha as Sweety Singh - Tetar and Anaro's daughter; Babbu, Dabloo and Diamond's sister; Rituraj's wife
- Vijay Kumar as Tetar Singh - Dabloo, Sweety, Babbu and Diamond's father; Anaro's husband
- Garima Vikrant Singh / Neelima Singh as Anaro Devi - Dabloo, Sweety, Babbu and Diamond's mother; Tetar's wife
- Rishi Khurana as Rituraj Singh - Sweety's husband; Tetar and Anaro's son-in-law; Dabloo, Babbu and Diamond's brother-in-law
- Karaan Singh as Dabloo Singh - Tetar and Anaro's eldest son; Rekha's husband; Sweety, Babbu and Diamond's brother
- Shiwani Chakraborty as Rekha Singh a.k.a. Gajwawali - Dabloo's wife; Tetar and Anaro's daughter-in-law; Sweety, Babbu and Diamond's sister-in-law
- Jatin Suri as Diamond Singh - Tetar and Anaro's youngest son; Dabloo, Sweety and Babbu's younger brother
- Rita Bhaduri as Imarti Devi - Tetar's mother; Anaro's mother-in-law; Dabloo, Sweety, Babbu and Diamond's grandmother
- Syed Ashraf Karim as Nahar Singh - political leader
- Reena Rani as Bimla Devi a.k.a. Dhumriwali - Rambhachan's neighbour; aunt figure to Nimki, Mahua and Monu
- Sulabha Arya as Parvati Devi - Abhimanyu's aunt
- Hemaakshi Ujjain as Neelu - Rambachan's sister; Nimki, Mahua and Monu's aunt
- Ahmad Harhash as Raj Singh - Babbu Singh's son

== Production ==
=== Development ===
Once, when I was travelling in Bihar, I saw a board that said ‘Mukhiya pati’ and below in small fonts was the name of his wife. When I tried to find out more, I realised the woman had become the mukhiya (village chief) thanks to the reservation but she still carried on with her household chores, while her husband managed her official work. That for me was a criminal act as they were misusing the power given to them. That intrigued me to write a story on how we as humans are sometimes not ready to embrace power or responsibilities.

— Zama Habib during September 2019

== Reception ==
=== Critics ===
Following the launch of Nimki Vidhayak, The Print praised the series stating, "The TV serial was a realistic portrayal of caste, class and gender politics in rural India, exposing the deep socio-cultural fissures that still run through the heart of the country. Nimki had stood her ground, an example for millions of exploited women in the country".

In February 2020, The Print again praised the series along with Nimki's character by stating, " For two years Nimki Mukhiya, the show and the character, have stood out in a cast of TV shows that feature a galaxy of young women characters overdressed and under-employed who inhabit huge, hollow mansions and spend entire episodes fighting with other women just like them over men who are equally overdressed and under-employed".

== Sequel series ==
A sequel series, Nimki Vidhayak starring Bhumika Gurung aired from 10 August 2019 to 1 February 2020 replacing this series.
