= Nishad Vaidya =

Indian television actor

Nishad Vaidy is an Indian television actor who was born in Gujarat and later moved to Mumbai He played a small role in Star Plus serial Pyaar Ka Dard Hai Meetha Meetha Pyaara Pyaara, then got his big break in the lead male role in Sony Entertainment Television serial Amita Ka Amit. He had lost 8-9 kilos weight for his role of a young professional husband.

== Television ==
Year	Serial	Role	Channel
2012	Pyaar Ka Dard Hai Meetha Meetha Pyaara Pyaara		Star Plus
2013	Amita Ka Amit	Amit Shah	Sony Entertainment Television
2015–2016	Bhaage Re Mann	Rohit	Zindagi
2020–2021	Qurbaan Hua	Alekh Nautiyal	Zee TV
2023 2024	Janam Janam Ka Saath Main hu saath tere	Sameer "Lucky"	Dangal Zeetv
