= Ishaaron Ishaaron Mein =

2019 Indian television series

- Genre: Drama
- Written by: Zama Habib
- Directed by: Rahib Siddiqui
- Creative director: Indrajit Mukherjee
- Starring: See below
- Music by: Manas-Shikhar
- Country of origin: India
- No. of seasons: 1
- No. of episodes: 187

Production
- Producers: Ishrat Ara; Zama Habib
- Cinematography: Satish Shetty
- Editor: Masih Habib
- Camera setup: Multi-camera
- Running time: 20 minutes
- Production company: Qissago Telefilms LLP

Original release
- Network: Sony Entertainment Television
- Release: 15 July 2019 – 31 March 2020

Ishaaron Ishaaron Mein (transl. Through the Gestures) is an Indian television series. The show was created by Qissago Telefilms LLP and produced by Ishrat Ara and Zama Habib. It stars Mudit Nayar, Simran Pareenja and Debattama Saha. The story is set in the alleys of Chawri Bazar, Old Delhi. Indian Idol 10 finalist Ankush Bhardwaj lent his voice to the title track "Ek Chup Tum, Ek Chup Main". It was aired and is available on SonyLIV.

The series ended on 30 March 2020 due to the COVID-19 crisis, after 187 episodes.

== Plot ==
The show features Yogi, a hearing-impaired man whose spirited handling of his disability and its acceptance by his family is meant to be inspiring. Yogi sets an example by celebrating life. The story traces his coming of age journey. He falls in love, gets his heart broken and finds unexpected love.

The story revolves around Yogi Shrivastava, a deaf and mute man living in old Delhi, who falls in love with Gunjan Sharma. Yogi's family plans for his marriage with Gunjan, but complications arise when Yogi repeatedly collides with Dr. Parineeti Ganguly (Pari). Despite initial misunderstandings, Yogi and Pari become friends, and Yogi's family bonds with Pari.

The story takes a serious turn when Rani, Yogi's sister-in-law, reveals a dark secret about her past involving her molester uncle. Yogi takes a stand against the predator, leading to family turmoil. Gunjan's engagement to another man, Roshan, adds to Yogi's heartbreak.

Pari helps Yogi cope up after he is stranded at the altar because of Gunjan and her family. As Yogi and Pari develop a deep friendship, they face various challenges, including societal expectations and family conflicts. Pari confesses her love to Yogi, leading to a romantic relationship. Yogi is happier than ever. However, Shiv Kumar Sharma, Gunjan's father, manipulates circumstances, forcing Yogi to agree to marry Gunjan and Pari to leave the Shrivastav house.

Yogi, torn between duty and love, eventually realizes his feelings for Pari. In fact, he is madly in love with Pari even after his marriage with Gunjan and leaves no stone unturned to stay close to Pari and ignores Gunjan, seeing which Yogi's family forces Pari to leave the city. Pari sacrifices her love for Yogi for his family's happiness and leaves the city. Meanwhile, Gunjan becomes pregnant, leading to unexpected reunions and revelations in the later part of the story.

Pari comes as the saving grace when Gunjan needs a doctor urgently, she also treats Nisha when she falls down the stairs and selflessly helps the family several times and even comes back to the Shrivastav house when Yogi's father requests her. Gunjan is seen jealous of Pari. When the family realizes that Yogi might still be in love Pari, they try to convince Pari to marry someone else and she being her selfless self agrees. Then she meets Sujoy who likes her but also suspects that Yogi and Pari love each other. On their engagement day, Pari admits that he does not love Sujoy and can't get engaged to him. Everyone suspects that she still loves Yogi, so does Yogi. Before, matters go out of hand, Gunjan reminds Yogi of the child who is yet to be born. Pari again has to leave the house so that Yogi and Gunjan's future remains intact.

Few months later, Yogi and Gunjan welcome a baby boy and Pari Sujoy meet each other sometimes, Pari still loves Yogi and stays away from him. It is revealed that there might be a cure to treat Gunjan and she could speak again giving her hope to fulfil her dream of being a singer and needs to go for treatment in another country and huge sum of money is required for thar.

This is where the story abruptly haults due to COVID-19, leaving the fates of Yogi, Pari, Sujoy and Gunjan intertwined.

== Cast ==
- Mudit Nayar as Yogesh "Yogi" Shrivastava – Prakash and Kusum's younger son; Vivek and Khushi's brother; Pari's love interest/ex-boyfriend/bestfriend; Gunjan's forced husband; Ansh's father
- Debattama Saha as Dr. Parineeti "Pari" Ganguly – Yogi's love interest/ex-girlfriend/bestfriend; Sujoy's love interest
- Simran Pareenja as Gunjan Sharma Shrivastava – Shiv and Seema's daughter; Gautam's sister; Roshan's ex fiancé; Yogi's forced wife; Ansh's mother
- Karan Godhwani as Sujoy Banerjee – Pari's love interest and Mohana's brother
- Kiran Karmarkar as Prakash Shrivastava – Om and Geeta's son; Kusum's husband; Vivek, Yogi and Khushi's father; Pihu and Ansh's grandfather
- Swati Shah as Kusum Shrivastava – Prakash's wife; Vivek, Yogi and Khushi's mother; Pihu and Ansh's grandmother
- Sudhir Pandey as Om Shrivastava – Geeta's husband; Prakash's father; Vivek, Yogi and Khushi's grandfather; Pihu and Ansh's great-grandfather
- Sulbha Arya as Geeta Shrivastava – Om's wife; Prakash's mother; Vivek, Yogi and Khushi's grandmother; Pihu and Ansh's great-grandmother
- Karaan Singh as Vivek Srivastav – Prakash and Kusum's elder son; Yogi and Khushi's brother; Rani's husband; Pihu's father
- Rishina Kandhari as Rani Shrivastava – Vivek's wife; Pihu's mother
- Sumbul Touqeer as Khushi Shrivastava – Prakash and Kusum's daughter; Vivek and Yogi's sister
- Mannat Mishra as Pihu Shrivastava – Vivek and Rani's daughter
- Saraswati Vijay as Nisha Mishra – Kabir's wife
- Pradeep Duhan as Kabir Mishra – Kailash and Pushpa's son; Prakash's nephew; Nisha's husband
- Nitesh Prashar as Babloo Qureshi – Yogi's friend
- Varinder Singh as Surjeet – Yogi's friend
- Sooraj Thapar as Shiv Sharma – Seema's husband; Gunjan and Gautam's father; Prakash's childhood friend; Ansh's grandfather
- Trishna Vivek as Seema Sharma – Shiv's wife; Gunjan and Gautam's mother; Ansh's grandmother
- Aksh Shah as Gautam Sharma – Shiv and Seema's son; Gunjan's brother
- Rajeev Kumar as Kailash Mishra – Pushpa's husband; Kabir's father
- Apoorv Chaturvedi as Roshan Chauhan – Pradeep's son; Gunjan's ex-fiancé
- Shriya Jha as Mohana Banerjee – Sujoy's sister
- Nishikant Dixit as Prabhakar Mishra – Rani's uncle and molester
- Pankaj Kalra as Pradeep Chauhan – Roshan's father
- Vishwa Gulati as Anirudh – Pari's suitor
- Shravani Goswami as Mrs. Ganguly – Pari's mother.
- Muktamukhi Sarkar as Dr. Neha – Pari's friend

== Awards and nominations ==
- Mudit Nayar won ITA Award for Best Actor (Jury)
