= Itti Si Khushi =

2025 Indian Hindi-language television series

- Created by: Goldie Behl; Sonnal A. Kakar
- Developed by: Paul Abbott
- Written by: Divya Nayyar; Amit Aaryan
- Screenplay by: Timir Baxi
- Directed by: Vikram Labhe
- Starring: Sumbul Touqeer; Rajat Verma; Rishi Saxena
- Country of origin: India
- Original language: Hindi
- No. of episodes: 234

Production
- Producers: Goldie Behl; Sabrina Duguet
- Cinematography: Sandeep Yadav
- Running time: 20 minutes
- Production companies: Rose Audio Visual Productions; All3Media International

Original release
- Network: Sony SAB
- Release: 18 August 2025 – 16 May 2026

Itti Si Khushi (transl. A Little Bit of Happiness) is an Indian television drama series that aired on Sony SAB from 18 August 2025 to 16 May 2026. Produced by Goldie Behl and Sabrina Duguet under the joint collaboration of Rose Audio Visual Productions and All3Media International, it starred Sumbul Touqeer and Rajat Verma. It is the official Hindi adaptation of British series Shameless.

== Plot ==
Set against the backdrop of Mumbai, Itti Si Khushi tells the story of Anvita Diwekar, a 21-year-old girl, the eldest of six siblings, who becomes the unexpected anchor of their crumbling home. With a father battling alcoholism and a mother who abandoned them, Anvita becomes the glue that holds her family together, sacrificing her education and setting aside her own aspirations to build a better future for them.

== Cast ==
=== Main ===
- Sumbul Touqeer as Anvita "Anvi" Diwekar Verma: Suhas and Hetal's elder daughter; Sanjay's ex-wife; Virat's wife (2025–2026)
- Rajat Verma as Virat "Vir" Verma: Rajnath and Urvashi's son; Anvita's second husband (2025–2026)
- Rishi Saxena as Inspector Sanjay Bhosale: Madhavi's son; Anvita's ex-husband (2025–2026)

=== Recurring ===
- Varun Badola as Suhas Diwekar: Hetal's husband (2025–2026)
- Neha Mehta as Hetal Diwekar: Suhas's wife (2025–2026)
- Sachin Kavetham as Siddhant "Siddhu" Diwekar: Suhas and Hetal's eldest son (2025–2026)
- Atharv Padhye as Yuvraj "Bandya" Diwekar: Dhananjay's son (2025–2026)
- Aayesha Vindhara as Charu "Chidiya" Diwekar: Suhas and Hetal's younger daughter (2025–2026)
- Harsh Jha as Chirag "Chiku" Diwekar: Suhas and Hetal's second son (2025–2026)
- Saiyansh Gupta as Bunny "Bunty" Diwekar: Suhas and Hetal's youngest son (2025–2026)
- Farukh Saeed as Rajnath Verma: Urvashi's husband (2025–2026)
- Pyumori Mehta Ghosh as Urvashi Verma: Rajnath's wife (2025–2026)
- Utkarsha Naik as Madhavi Bhosale: Sanjay's mother (2025-2026)
- Vinayak Bhave as Mr. Mehta: Nandita's husband (2025)
- Gauri Tonk as Nandita Mehta: Mr. Mehta's wife; (2025)
- Dhritika Singh as Suhani Mehta: Mr. Mehta and Nandita's daughter (2025)
- Meghna Kukreja as Diya Fernandes Irani: Phoebe's daughter (2025-2026)
- Meherzan Mazda as Percy Irani: Anvita and Sanjay's childhood friend; Diya's husband (2025–2026)
- Ritu Vashisht as Phoebe Fernandes: Diya's mother (2025)
- Amit Dolawat as Raghu: Kim's husband; Yuvraj's boss (2025)
- Garima Jain as Kim: Raghu's wife; Yuvraj's crush (2025)
- Garima Kaushal as Dhruvi: Anvita and Diya's friend; Virat's lover (2025–2026)
- Suhasini Mulay as Surekha Ajji (2025)
- Ankur Jain as Principal (2025–2026)
- Shalini Chandran as Advocate Leena Dharmadhikari (2025–2026)
- Manikssh Dutt as Dhananjay Mehta: Yuvraj father (2026)
- Susheel Parashar as Yashwant Suri (2026)
- Shimlaa Bishnoi as Preeti Suri (2026)
- Bhumika Gurung as Sara Sethi: Anvita's boss; Yash's widow and murderer (2026)
- Manish Khanna as Yash Sethi: A businessman; Sara's husband (2026)

== Production ==
=== Casting ===
Sumbul Touqeer was roped in to play the female lead Anvita Diwekar. Varun Badola was cast as Suhas Diwekar, after a six year television hiatus. On 1 July 2025, Rajat Verma was confirmed to play main lead opposite Sumbul. Gauri Tonk was selected to play Nandita Mehta.

== Crossover ==
It had a crossover with Pushpa Impossible from 24 September 2025 to 26 September 2025.
