= Nimki Vidhayak =

Indian Hindi-language television serial

- Genre: Drama
- Created by: Zama Habib
- Written by: Zama Habib
- Directed by: Rakesh Kumar Inder Das
- Creative director: Manjari Mukul
- Starring: Bhumika Gurung; Abhishek Sharma
- Country of origin: India
- Original language: Hindi
- No. of episodes: 150

Production
- Producers: Zama Habib; Ishrat Ara
- Editor: Masih Habib
- Camera setup: Multi-camera
- Running time: 20–22 minutes
- Production company: Qissago Telefilms LLP

Original release
- Network: Star Bharat
- Release: 12 August 2019 – 1 February 2020

Related
- Nimki Mukhiya

Nimki Vidhayak is an Indian Hindi-language drama television serial broadcast by Star Bharat. It starred Bhumika Gurung and Abhishek Sharma and premiered on 28 August 2017 on Star Bharat. The show's main theme is about women's empowerment and shows how a girl becomes the Mukhiya (village chief) of her village and then a Vidhayak (MLA) and strives to make a difference in the complicated world of politics. This show is also adapted in Marathi language as name Pinki Cha Vijay Aso.

== Plot ==
Two years later, Nimki becomes Vidhayak and she lives with Bimla Chachi and Monu. Nimki holds Tunney and Mahua responsible for her unborn's death. Mahua and Tunney don't believe that for once Nimki ever asked them why they did so. Mahua is pursuing her education while Tunney does small jobs, both live in Patna. Anaro Devi can't handle the death of Babbu and goes insane which led her to stay in a mental asylum. Nimki never forgets her unborn child and hence helps Anaro Devi in her treatment.

Sweety and Abhimanyu are now happily married, Sweety is pregnant and they live in Patna with their daughter Alina. Nimki becomes Vidhayak and comes to Patna, regains her rights on her bungalow by dramatically fighting with ex-MLA. The hero of the show, Mintoo Singh, now appears. Mintoo Singh (played by Abhishek Sharma) is a look-alike of Babbu Singh but has a completely different personality. He lives with his dadi (Dadi is the older version of Nimki) and has two friends Pichku and Tillu. Mintoo, unlike Babbu Singh, is a happy-go-lucky boy. Nimki meets the powerful and good-hearted Ganga Devi. While protesting outside Vidhan Bhawan, Ganga Devi is shot by a goon and she is hospitalised. It is later revealed that she is the one who hired the gunman to shoot her security personnel so that she can gain some sympathy and votes. Nimki, unaware of the true face of Gangadevi, idolises her. Ganga Devi has a spoiled son, Parag. While driving rashly, he hits Anaro Devi who runs behind Mintoo Singh, thinking he is her Babbu. Nimki and Mintoo face some hit-and-miss moments. While helping Mishra's sister in marriage, Nimki and Mintoo have to don an avatar of bride and groom, that's where Nimki first saw Mintoo and is completely traumatised.

Nimki and Mintoo meet again in hospital where she realises that he is not Babbu, but his look alike. Since Nimki helps in the marriage of Mishra (another MLA)'s sister against his will, he wants to kill her. Mintoo saves her in time. He brings her home where Dadi calls the bride's family to fix Mintoo's marriage. They misunderstand Nimki and Mintoo's relationship and the alliance breaks. Mintoo cares for Nimki. Dadi doesn't like Nimki because she is MLA. Mintoo's mother (Ganga Devi) leaves Mintoo for politics hence Dadi hates politics and politicians.

Mintoo Singh receives news of his Dadi having a brain tumor and is saddened. Accidentally Mintoo completes process of jitiya fast, Anaro Devi demands to eat food only if Babbu feeds her. Food intake is much needed for Anaro Devi, hence Nimki decides to change the avatar of Mintoo Singh to Babbu Singh. Mintoo Singh agrees for the same and Nimki gives him training to become Babbu Singh. Mintu and his friends hold a protest in front of Ganga Devi's house chanting slogans, Mintu does the protest only for the treatment of his dadi. Nimki tries to hide Mintu from her family, she knows this will badly impact everyone, especially Sweety (Shriya Jha). Ganga Devi traps Shukla, therefore Shukla has to call police and arrest his own men. Ganga Devi calls Nimki and asks her to stop Mintu otherwise he may land in trouble. To impress Ganga Devi, Nimki with the help of Dadi, makes a drama of Dadi's death. Upon learning about Dadi's death Mintu runs towards home. After recognizing the foul play, Mintu strangles Nimki and is angry at Nimki (since Mintu knows that Dadi is actually suffering and can die anytime if not treated), after realising his mistake he apologises to Nimki and they resume their plan of Babbu Simgh to treat Anaro Devi. Mintu and Nimki's family attends Navratri function that was held by Ganga Devi. Ganga Devi arranges this function to divert peoples mind from Parag's gambling. Mintu and Nimki share some moments and dance together. On Dadi's insistence, Tillu, Pichku and Mintu return home halfway through the function. Nimki dances with Ganga Devi. At function Nimki meets with Tunney and Mahua and the sisters quarrel. Mahua leaves the function in anger but in meanwhile Parag (Sagar Wahi) misbehaves with her. Nimki slaps Parag for his action. Mahua gives statement against Nimki to the media. At night Ganga Devi's goons throw Tunney and Mahua out of the house along with their baggage. After a long drama, Mahua and Tunney settle in Nimki's bungalow. Ganga Devi attempts to topple the current government by using a "No Confidence Motion" and she is confident that the government will fall. But the government survives by a two-vote margin, since Nimki and Ganga Devi vote to sustain, to save Dadi because Dadi was kidnapped by Shukla and to hide the past. After many circumstances, Mintu blackmails Ganga Devi.

No one knows where Mintu is, after the motion of censure, he is nowhere to found. It is later revealed that Ganga Devi kidnaps Mintu, Mintu saves Mahua and runs into jungle. Ganga Devi tricks Nimki in believing that Mintu is the wrong one, Nimki shoots Mintu believing he raped Mahua when he is trying to awaken her from dizziness. Everyone treats Mintu as a criminal and handcuff him, Tillu and Pichku dislike this since both of them think Mintu can't misbehave with women. Sweety sees Mintu and recalls her moment with Babbu Singh. When Mahua regains consciousness she tells truth, Nimki apologises to Mintu. When Mintu doesn't forgive her, Abhimanyu tells him how Babbu mistreated Nimki. Mintu forgives her after learning that Babbu raped her and Nimki thought Mintu is doing same with her younger sister. Meanwhile Dadi falls unconscious. Nimki helps Mintu in Dadi's operation, to return her favour Mintu helps Nimki by bringing Anaro to his home and takes care of her as his own mother. Gajwawali Bhabhi enters Mintu's house to help him. Ganga Devi tries to turn Anaro against Nimki for causing Babbu's death. For Anaro's sake, Mintu fills Nimki's hairlines.

Mahua is selected for a beauty pageant, it is later revealed that she was never selected and it was a trap for human trafficking, a business run by Ganga Devi and Shukla. Meanwhile Ganga Devi and Nimki topple Shukla's government. Nimki, BDO Babu and Tunney try to find Mahua's location. They find her and save the trapped girls. Nimki decides to punish culprit and when she learns it is none other than Ganga Devi, she tricks Ganga Devi into suggesting her as the new CM. Mintu struggles to confess his feelings to Nimki when he sends off Anaro and Gajwawali Bhabhi to Nimki's house. In the last scene Nimki dramatically arrests Ganga Devi and becomes the new CM of Bihar.

== Cast ==
=== Main ===
- Bhumika Gurung Malhotra as Namkeen "Nimki" Kumari - M.L.A in Bihar Vidhan Sabha, Mahua and Monu's sister, Babbu Singh's widow, Mintu and Tillu’s love interest
- Abhishek Sharma as Mintu Singh - Ganga Devi's estranged son, Nimki's love interest

=== Recurring ===
- Manish Goel as Abhimanyu Rai a.k.a. BDO Babu - Elena's father, Sweety's second husband
- Shriya Jha as Sweety Rai - Babbu's sister, Abhimanyu's second wife, Elena's adoptive mother
- Priyanshu Singh as Tunney - Nimki's friend, Mahua's love interest
- Neelima Singh as Anaro Devi - Dabloo, Sweety, Babbu and Diamond's mother
- Shiwani Chakraborty as Rekha a.k.a. Gajwawali - Babbu's sister-in-law, Anaro's daughter-in-law
- Saniya Noorain as Mahua Kumari - Nimki and Monu's sister; Tunney's love interest
- Arafat Shaikh as Monu - Nimki and Mahua's younger brother
- Reena Rani as Bimla Devi - Nimki's aunt
- Farida Dadi as Laadli Singh - Mintu's grandmother, Ganga Devi's first mother-in-law
- Shashank Mishra as Pichku - Mintu's friend
- Arjun Singh Shekhawat as Tillu - Mintu's friend; Nimki's admirer
- Shruti Ulfat as Ganga Devi - Opposition leader in Bihar Vidhan Sabha, Mintu and Parag's mother
- Sagar Wahi as Parag Singh - Ganga Devi's younger son, Mintu's half-brother
- Rajveer Singh as KP Mishra - MLA In Ganga Devi's party
- Syed Ashraf Karim as Nahar Singh
- Ahmad Harhash as Young Nahar Singh

== Production ==
The final episode of Nimki Mukhiya aired in mid-August 2019. The makers chose to not lengthen the story, hence they decided to give a logical conclusion to the show and return with a second season.
