= Zindagi Mere Ghar Aana =

Indian television series

- Genre: Slice Of Life; Comedy; Romance; Melodrama
- Created by: Zama Habib
- Written by: Zama Habib; Ghanshyam Bhatt
- Directed by: Rahib Siddiqui; Inder Das
- Creative director: Indrajit Mukherjee
- Starring: Hasan Zaidi; Esha Kansara
- Theme music composer: Sajjad-Ali Chandwini; Shaf'aat Ali
- Opening theme: Zindagi…Mere Ghar Aana by Shreya Ghoshal
- Country of origin: India
- Original language: Hindi
- No. of episodes: 138

Production
- Producers: Zama Habib; Ishrat Ara
- Production locations: Mumbai, Maharashtra
- Cinematography: Satish Shetty
- Editor: Masih Habib
- Camera setup: Multi-camera
- Running time: 20–21 minutes
- Production company: Qissago Telefilms LLP

Original release
- Network: StarPlus
- Release: 26 July 2021 – 1 January 2022

Zindagi Mere Ghar Aana (transl. Life Comes to My Home) is an Indian drama television series that premiered on 26 July 2021 on StarPlus and it is digitally available on Disney+ Hotstar. Produced by Zama Habib under Qissago Telefilms LLP, it stars Hasan Zaidi and Esha Kansara. The series ended on 1 January 2022, and it was replaced by Kabhi Kabhie Ittefaq Sey in its timeslot.

== Plot ==
The story opens with the middle-class Sakhujas who are mourning the sudden demise of their eldest son, Karan Sakhuja. Karan lost his life serving as a health-warrior and treating the COVID-19 affected patients. Amrita, Karan's pregnant widow hides her sadness and tries to lighten up the mood of her family.

But the Sakhujas bad luck never ends with their sole bread-winners Guneet and Angad losing their source of income. To make matters worse, Krishnakant Sehgal, the Sakhujas family friend who turned rich through his sanitizer business and had promised his daughter Meera's hand for Angad, breaks the alliance as he feels the Sakhujas no longer match his status.

Well the Sakhujas are facing a complete distress both emotionally and financially, there enters Pritam Choudhary in their lives as their tenant. Pritam has a mysterious identity revolving around the crime world and is himself holding a dark and tragic past. When Pritam agrees to pay the huge amount of rent which the Sakhujas demand.

The Sakhujas are overjoyed and decide to keep him much to the dissatisfaction of Amrita, who has met Pritam even earlier in many uncanny situations and strongly feels that he is not the right tenant. But when Pritam saves Angad's life, Amrita agrees on keeping him as their tenant. Initially, Pritam is constantly bugged by the overly-caring attitude of the Sakhujas which always cause interference with his work. But as time passes, he starts empathizing with their miserable situation and develops a strong pity and respect for Amrita which gradually leads Pritam getting attracted towards her.

But at that moment Pritam's past involving his wife, Vishaka and son, Rahul returns to his life which is when Pritam Choudhary is revealed to be a valiant IPS officer. Despite having faced a lot of tragedies in life, Pritam never stops himself from fulfilling his duties. With the help of his seniors he takes the identity of a drug peddler along with his colleagues and friends Nitin and Monty to entrap all the treacherous drug mafias.

After the birth of Ansh, when Pritam gets more emotionally involved with the Sakhuja family and nurtures a stronger liking for Amrita, he also gets to face one of the treacherous drug mafias, UD. During the Sakhujas' Christmas celebration, Pritam dressed as Santa brings Karan's ashes for the Sakhujas, who finally performed his last rites.

=== 2 months later ===
The show ends when Pritam and Amrita finally gets along with each other.

== Cast ==
=== Main ===
- Hasan Zaidi as IPS Pritam Choudhary: Sakhujas' tenant; Vishakha's ex-husband; Rahul's father (2021–2022)
- Esha Kansara as Amrita Sakhuja: Kuljeet and Saroj's daughter; Karan's widow; Ansh's mother (2021–2022)

=== Recurring ===
- Ankit Narang as Angad Sakhuja: Guneet and Nimrat's second son; Karan, Kabir and Sonia's brother; Meera's former fiancé (2021–2022)
- Ishhan Dhawan as Kabir Sakhuja: Guneet and Nimrat's youngest son; Karan, Angad and Sonia's brother; Meera's love interest (2021–2022)
- Cheshta Mehta as Meera Sehgal: Krishnakant and Meenakshi's elder daughter; Naveen and Divya's sister; Angad's former fiancé; Kabir's love interest (2021–2022)
- Akansha Sareen as Vishaka Choudhary: Pritam's ex-wife; Rahul's mother (2021)
- Hitesh Makhija as UD: A drug mafia (2021)
- Rohan Gandotra as Yuvraj Singh: An NRI (2021)
- Nakul Vaid as Dr. Karan Sakhuja: Guneet and Nimrat's eldest son; Angad, Kabir and Sonia's brother; Amrita's late husband; Ansh's father (2021; dead)
- Dolly Chawla as Sonia "Soni" Sakhuja: Guneet and Nimrat's daughter; Karan, Angad and Kabir's sister (2021–2022)
- Swati Shah as Nimrat "Nimmo" Sakhuja: Guneet's wife; Karan, Angad, Kabir and Sonia's mother; Ansh's grandmother. (2021–2022)
- Adarsh Gautam as Guneet Sakhuja: Sukhbir and Santosh's son; Pammi's brother; Nimrat's husband; Karan, Angad, Kabir and Sonia's father; Ansh's grandfather (2021–2022)
- Sudhir Pandey as Sukhbir Sakhuja: Santosh's husband; Guneet and Pammi's father; Karan, Angad, Kabir and Sonia's grandfather; Ansh's great-grandfather, (2021–2022)
- Sulbha Arya as Santosh Sakhuja: Sukhbir's wife; Guneet and Pammi's mother; Karan, Angad, Kabir and Soni's grandmother; Ansh's great-grandmother (2021–2022)
- S. M. Zaheer as Mansoor Siddiqui: Sukbhir's friend who sent Pritam as Sakhuja's tenant. (2021)
- Prashant Pundir as Senior Inspector Nitin Kumar: Pritam's friend (2021)
- Ranvierr Chahal as Senior Inspector Monty Singh: Pritam's friend (2021)
- Mamta Verma as Saroj Chopra: Kuljeet's wife; Amrita's mother; Ansh's grandmother (2021)
- Pankaj Kalra as Kuljeet Chopra: Saroj's husband; Amrita's father; Ansh's grandfather (2021)
- Shweta Gautam as Pammi Sakhuja Prasad: Sukhbir and Santosh's daughter; Guneet's sister; Baljeet's wife (2021)
- Rajeev Mehra as Baljeet Prasad: Pammi's husband (2021)
- Kiran Karmarkar as Krishnakant Sehgal: Meenakshi's husband; Meera, Naveen and Divya's father (2021)
- Shubhangi Latkar as Shabana "Aapa": Meera, Naveen and Divya's Aapa (2021)
- Kunal Singh Jerath as Naveen Sehgal: Krishnakant and Meenakshi's son; Meera and Divya's brother (2021)
- Jinal Jain as Divya Sehgal: Krishnakant and Meenakshi's younger daughter; Meera and Naveen's sister (2021)
- Preeti Mishra as Kamli Prashant: Sakhuja's household helper (2021)
- Syed Ashraf Karim as Sethi: Owner of an advertising agency; Kabir and Meera's boss (2021)
- Priya Rathore as Dolly Chaddha: Chaddha’s daughter; Kabir's ex–lover (2021)
- Ahmad Harhash as Ansh Sakhuja: Karan and Amrita's son (2021)
- Gagan Gupta as Chaddha: Dolly's father; Sakhujas' neighbour (2021)
- Abhishek Soni as Sunny: Kabir's friend (2021)
- Daksh Sharma as Rony: Kabir's friend (2021)
- Shivani Gosain as Tutu: Sakhujas' neighbour who has a crush on Pritam (2021)
- Prachi Vaishnav as Jassi: Amrita's sister, UD's fiance (2021)

== Production ==
=== Development ===
The show was conceived during COVID-19 times when India faced lockdown. Idea was to tell the story of the people who suffered due to the life threatening virus and the aftermath of lockdown. The title Zindagi Mere Ghar Aana was taken from the 1979 film Dooriyaan's song, "Zindagi Mere Ghar Aana" sung by Anuradha Paudwal and Bhupinder Singh.

Esha Kansara studied pregnancy to play the character of to-be mother Amrita. She also studied Punjabi dialect while Hasan Zaidi lost 12 kg during the COVID-19 lockdown to fit into his character of Pritam.

=== Casting ===
Iqbal Khan was initially approached to play the lead role of Pritam but was later replaced by Hasan Zaidi.

Esha Kansara was cast as the lead Amrita opposite Zaidi. Ishhan Dhawan was cast to portray Kabir.

=== Release ===
The first promo was released on 7 July 2021 featuring the leads Zaidi, Kansara and the cast of Sakhujas. The next teaser was released on 14 July 2021, revealing the launch date. Later a promo was released on 22 July 2021 featuring Indian playback and professional singer, Shreya Ghoshal promote the series by melodizing the 1979 version 'Zindagi Mere Ghar Aana' in a newer version composed by Tapas Relia.

=== Filming ===
The series is based on a middle-class family based in Patel Nagar, New Delhi, but it is completely filmed at a set at Film City, Mumbai. The shooting commenced in late March 2021, It was halted on 14 April due to the COVID-19 lockdown in Maharashtra. The shooting resumed on 17 June 2021.

== Reception ==
=== Ratings in UK ===
Zindagi Mere Ghar Aana was the third most watched show on 6 November 2021, with 44 K viewers. On 15 November 2021, it was the second most watched show with 89.8 K viewers.
