= Piya Abhimani =

Indian drama television series

- Genre: Drama; Romance
- Screenplay by: Bhavna Shah
- Story by: Charu Singh; Ajyarya Patnayak
- Directed by: Amit Gupta
- Starring: Akshit Sukhija; Aastha Sharma
- Theme music composer: Ripul Sharma
- Opening theme: "Piya Abhimani"
- Country of origin: India
- Original language: Hindi
- No. of seasons: 1
- No. of episodes: 42

Production
- Producers: Charu Singh; Ajyarya Patnayak
- Cinematography: Sudesh Kotian; Pankaj Kachva
- Editors: Dharmesh Patel; Ajay Pandey
- Camera setup: Multi-camera
- Running time: 22-24 minutes
- Production company: Full Focus Entertainment

Original release
- Network: Dangal TV
- Release: 27 February – 15 April 2023

Piya Abhimani is an Indian Hindi-language romance series starring Akshit Sukhija and Aastha Sharma. It premiered on 27 February 2023 to 15 April 2023 and aired on Dangal TV under the banner of Full Focus Entertainment.

== Plot ==
The series introduces Agastya and Avantika, who were childhood friends who were separated, and are now adults. Avantika is a simple girl who lives with her family while Agastya is a famous businessman who lives with his mother. Avantika and Agastya meet each other, but are unaware that they were childhood friends. They fight during a party. Agastya finds out that Avantika is his childhood friend and they reconcile. However, Kiran, Avantika's mother, is a greedy woman who doesn't want to let Avantika marry Agastya, which leads to his arrogance.

== Cast ==
=== Main ===
- Akshit Sukhija as Agastya Shrivastav: Ishwar and Kumud's son; Angad's cousin; Priya's elder brother; Shenaya's friend; Avantika's husband
- Aastha Sharma as Avantika Shrivastav: Yash and Sakshi's daughter; Kiran's step-daughter; Akshay and Trishna's step-sister; Agastya's wife

=== Recurring ===
- Sandhya Shungloo as Mrs. Jamuna Devi Shrivastav: Ishwar's mother; Agastya and Priya's grandmother
- Hemang K. Palan as Ishwar Shrivastav: Mrs. Shrivastav's son; Kumud's husband; Agastya and Priya's father
- Shalini Kapoor Sagar as Kumud Shrivastav: Ishwar's wife; Agastya and Priya's mother
- Palak Rana as Priya Shrivastav: Ishwar and Kumud's daughter; Agastya's younger sister
- Shikhar Sharma as Bijli's husband; Angad's father
- Akansha Sharma as Bijli: Angad's mother
- Deepak Khati as Angad: Bijli's son; Agastya's cousin
- Jairoop Jeevan as Yash Sinha: Kiran's husband; Sakshi's ex-husband; Avanthika, Akshay and Trishna's father
- Dolly Sohi as Kiran Sinha: Yash's second wife; Avanthika's stepmother; Akshay and Trishna's mother
- Gursharanpreet Singh as Akshay Sinha: Yash and Kiran's son; Avantika's youngest step-brother; Trishna's elder brother
- Surbhi Rohra as Trishna Sinha: Yash and Kiran's daughter; Avantika's youngest step-sister; Akshay's younger sister
- Vaishali Arora as Shenaya: Agastya's friend and obsessive lover; Avantika's rival and ex-fiancé
- Ram Awana as Makhan Singh
- Nisha Pareek as Pooja
- Minoli Nandwana as Avantika's friend

== Production ==
=== Release ===
The series was announced on Dangal TV by Full Focus Entertainment. Akshit Sukhija as Agastya and Aastha Sharma as Avantika were signed as the leads. The first promo was released on 10 February 2023 featuring Akshit Sukhija and Aastha Sharma.

=== Cancellation ===
The Show Went Off air Within two Months. The last episode aired on 15 April 2023. The show ran for 42 episodes.

== Soundtrack ==
Ore Piya

Soundtrack album
- Released: 2023
- Genre: Romance; Soundtrack
- Length: 3:01
- Language: Hindi
- Label: Enterr10 Television Network
- Producer: Charu Singh Ajyarya Patnayak

Tracklisting
No.	Title	Length
1.	"Ore Piya"
Total length:		3:01

== See also ==
- List of programmes broadcast by Dangal TV
