= Fanaa: Ishq Mein Marjawan =

Indian thriller drama television series

- Also known as: Ishq Mein Marjawan 3
- Genre: Romance; Thriller
- Created by: Dipti Kalwani
- Story by: Dipti Kalwani, Shokhi Banerjee; Srinita Bhoumick
- Starring: See below
- Opening theme: Ishq Mein Marjawan
- Country of origin: India
- Original language: Hindi
- No. of seasons: 1
- No. of episodes: 155

Production
- Producers: Dipti Kalwani; Karishma Jain; Gul Khan
- Camera setup: Multi-camera
- Running time: 25 minutes
- Production companies: Sunny Side Up Films Pvt Ltd; 4 Lions Films

Original release
- Network: Colors TV (31 January 2022–5 August 2022); Voot (8 August 2022–2 September 2022)
- Release: 31 January – 2 September 2022

Related
- Ishq Mein Marjawan; Ishq Mein Marjawan 2 Ishq Mein Marjawan 2: Naya Safar

Fanaa: Ishq Mein Marjawan is a 2022 Indian thriller series produced by Dipti Kalwani, Karishma Jain and Gul Khan. The third installment of Ishq Mein Marjawan franchise, it stars Ayaz Ahmed, Zain Imam, Reem Shaikh and Akshit Sukhija. Series aired on Colors TV From 8 August 2022 to 2 September 2022.

== Plot ==
Agastya is a suave businessman and tech-genius, who unconditionally loves Paakhi, so much so that his feelings for her gradually turn into an obsession. Paakhi, on the other hand, is optimistic and carefree and runs an event management company. They are best friends and share their lives with each other. Paakhi likes to live in her fairytale world and believes that she is the universe's favourite child. However, she is oblivious to the fact that Agastya, whom she so adores and blindly trusts, is the one who has been pulling the strings of her life creating an illusion for her. As the story unfolds, Paakhi falls in love with a virtuous oncologist, Dr Ishaan Tandon, so Agastya, plans and plots to shake every pillar of her existence. Agastya's strong affection for Paakhi leads to many complexities and a whirlwind of emotions.

Paakhi discovers the truth about Agastya. Distraught by what Agastya did, Paakhi collaborates with Ishaan to make Agastya confess his crime. On the other hand, Agastya's step-mother Meera returns to snatch Agastya's property and wealth. Paakhi finally manages to expose Agastya. But before Paakhi could punish him, Agastya kidnaps her. On the other hand, Virat meets with an accident and the case is handed to his brother Karanjit. Paakhi manages to flee from Agastya but meets with an accident. When doctors lose hope on Paakhi, Agastya walks on coal to save her. After knowing all this Paakhi develops a soft corner for Agastya. Agastya and Paakhi celebrate their three-month anniversary. Paakhi mixes sleeping pills in Agastya's drink and flees, however, she is kidnapped by Meera. Meera calls Agastya into the forest where Agastya learns that his henchmen Yug is actually Meera's biological son and his half-brother. Agastya tries to save Paakhi but she takes a bullet for him. Paakhi falls down a cliff, Agastya goes mad, and Meera along with Yug frame Agastya for Paakhi's death. Agastya is sent to a mental asylum, where he is given shocks, which makes him lose his sanity and revert to the mental age of a child.

=== 6 months later ===
Meera made all the members of Raichand family and Srivastav family her servants. She even uses Agastya's mental condition for her pleasure. Neelima's finds a lookalike of Paakhi, Bulbul, who is a dancer by profession. Bulbul becomes best friend with the mentally disabled Agastya and even gets a job by blackmailing Meera. It is then revealed that Bulbul is in fact Paakhi in reality who is pretending to be Bulbul to take revenge from Meera. Agastya also recovers and they expose Meera. Pakhi and Agastya reunite and live happily but Ishaan returns to take revenge and creates misunderstandings between the two leading Pakhi to believe that Agastya never changed and was only pretending. Pakhi is pregnant with Agastya's child but due to the misunderstandings, she doesn't tell him and leaves the city forever to raise the child on her own. She leaves letters behind for her own family and Agastya.

=== 6 years later ===
Pakhi lives in Shimla with her and Agastya's daughter Tara while Agastya lives with his family in Delhi. Tara insists Pakhi to take her to Delhi so that she can participate in a competition for kids which was organised by Agastya. Unaware of the fact that Agastya is organizing the competition, Pakhi and Tara come to Delhi so that Tara can take part in it. Eventually Pakhi and Agastya meet. Ishaan who is still obsessed with Pakhi tries to kidnap her and kill Agastya but ends up being shot to death by the police. Meera returns to destroy Tara, Agastya and Pakhi. Agastya and Pakhi clear their misunderstandings and save Tara from Meera.Meera ends up burnt to death. The show ends with the family happy and united with the birth of Pakhi and Agastya's second child.

== Cast ==
=== Main ===
- Reem Shaikh as Paakhi "Bulbul" Srivastav Raichand: Prema and Sameer's daughter; Shanaya's sister; Agatsya's wife; Tara and Baby's mother (2022)
- Zain Imam in a double role as
  - Agastya Raichand: Meera's step-son; Yug's half-brother; Paakhi's husband; Tara and Baby's father (2022)
  - Arjun "Vicky" Sharma: Agatsya's look-alike; Meera's henchman (2022)

=== Recurring ===
- Akshit Sukhija as Dr. Ishaan Tandon: Vibhushan's son; Shubham's brother; Paakhi's ex-fiancé (2022)
- Ayaz Ahmed as Yug Raichand – Meera's son; Agastya's henchmen and half-brother; Naveli's cousin; Shanaya's Love Interest (2022)
- Kishwer Merchant as Meera Raichand – Agastya's step-mother; Yug's mother (2022)
- Avinash Sahijwani as Sameer Srivastav – Anuj's brother; Prema's husband; Pakhi and Shanaya's father;Tara and Baby's grandfather (2022)
- Mamta Verma as Prema Srivastav – Sameer's wife; Pakhi and Shanaya's mother; Tara and Baby's grandmother (2022)
- Shruti Chaudhary as Shanaya Srivastav – Sameer and Prema's younger daughter; Pakhi's sister; Mohit's cousin; Yug's Love Interest (2022)
- Riddhi Sharma as Tara Raichand – Pakhi and Agastya’s daughter Baby's sister (2022)
- Gargi Patel/Meenakshi Sethi as Neelima Raichand – Mona's mother; Agastya, Naveli and Yug's grandmother (2022)
- James Ghadge as Mohit Srivastav – Anuj and Leela's son; Paakhi and Shanaya's cousin (2022)
- Melanie Nazareth as Mona Raichand Nanda: Neelima's daughter; Naveli's mother; Agastya and Yug's aunt (2022)
- Prachi Kadam/Arista Mehta as Naveli Nanda – Mona's daughter; Agastya and Yug's cousin (2022)
- Manoj Chandila as ACP Ranjit Singh – Virat's brother (2022)
- Sagar Parekh as Shubham Tandon – Vibhushan's younger son; Ishaan's brother (2022)
- Aashish Kaul as Vibhushan Tandon – Ishaan and Shubham's father (2022)
- Afzaal Khan as Anuj Srivastav – Sameer's brother; Leela's husband; Mohit's father (2022)
- Swati Tarar as Leela Srivastav – Anuj's wife; Mohit's mother (2022)
- Sangeeta Panwar as Jugnu – Agastya's daima (2022)
- Krip Suri as Inspector Virat Singh – Ranjit's brother (2022)
- Amruta Vedpathak as Tanya Verma – Pakhi's friend (2022)
- Bhawna Ahuja as Tina Ahuja – Agastya's business associate (2022)
- Rishikesh Ingley as Devesh Khanna – Agastya's business rival (2022)
- Aakash Talwar as Rajeev Kumar: Ranveer's brother (2022)
- Ahmad Harhash as Ranveer Kumar: Rajeev's brother (2022)

== Production ==
=== Development ===
The show was initially titled as Fanaa - Tere Ishq Mein, but was later retitled Fanaa: Ishq Mein Marjawan. From August 8, 2022, the series streamed on Voot under the name Fanaa: Ishq Mein Marjawan Aakhri Imtihaan which went off air on 2 September 2022.

=== Casting ===
Reem Shaikh was cast to play Paakhi Srivastava. Akshit Sukhija was chosen to play Dr. Ishaan Tandon while Zain Imam was selected to play Agastya Raichand. Aakash Talwar bagged a special appearance as Rajeev. Later, Ayaz Ahmed and Krip Suri joined in February 2022. In April 2022, Manoj Chandila and Kishwer Merchant were introduced.

In July 2022, Akshit Sukhija quit the show.

== See also ==
- List of programmes broadcast by Colors TV
