= Reem Shaikh =

Indian television actress (born 2002)

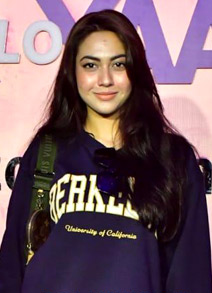
- Shaikh in 2024
- Born: Reem Sameer Shaikh; 8 September 2002 (age 24); Mumbai, Maharashtra, India
- Occupation: Actress
- Years active: 2010—present
- Known for: Na Bole Tum Na Maine Kuch Kaha; Chakravartin Ashoka Samrat; Tujhse Hai Raabta; Gul Makai; Fanaa: Ishq Mein Marjawan; Khatra Khatra Khatra; Tere Ishq Mein Ghayal; Laughter Chefs – Unlimited Entertainment

Reem Shaikh (born 8 September 2002) is an Indian actress, known for her works in Indian television and Hindi cinema. Her work includes Yeh Rishta Kya Kehlata Hai, Na Bole Tum Na Maine Kuch Kaha, Chakravartin Ashoka Samrat, Tujhse Hai Raabta, Gul Makai, Fanaa: Ishq Mein Marjawan, Khatra Khatra Khatra, Tere Ishq Mein Ghayal and Laughter Chefs – Unlimited Entertainment.

== Early life ==
Shaikh was born on 8 September 2002 in Mumbai, Maharashtra to Sameer and Sheetal Shaikh.

== Career ==
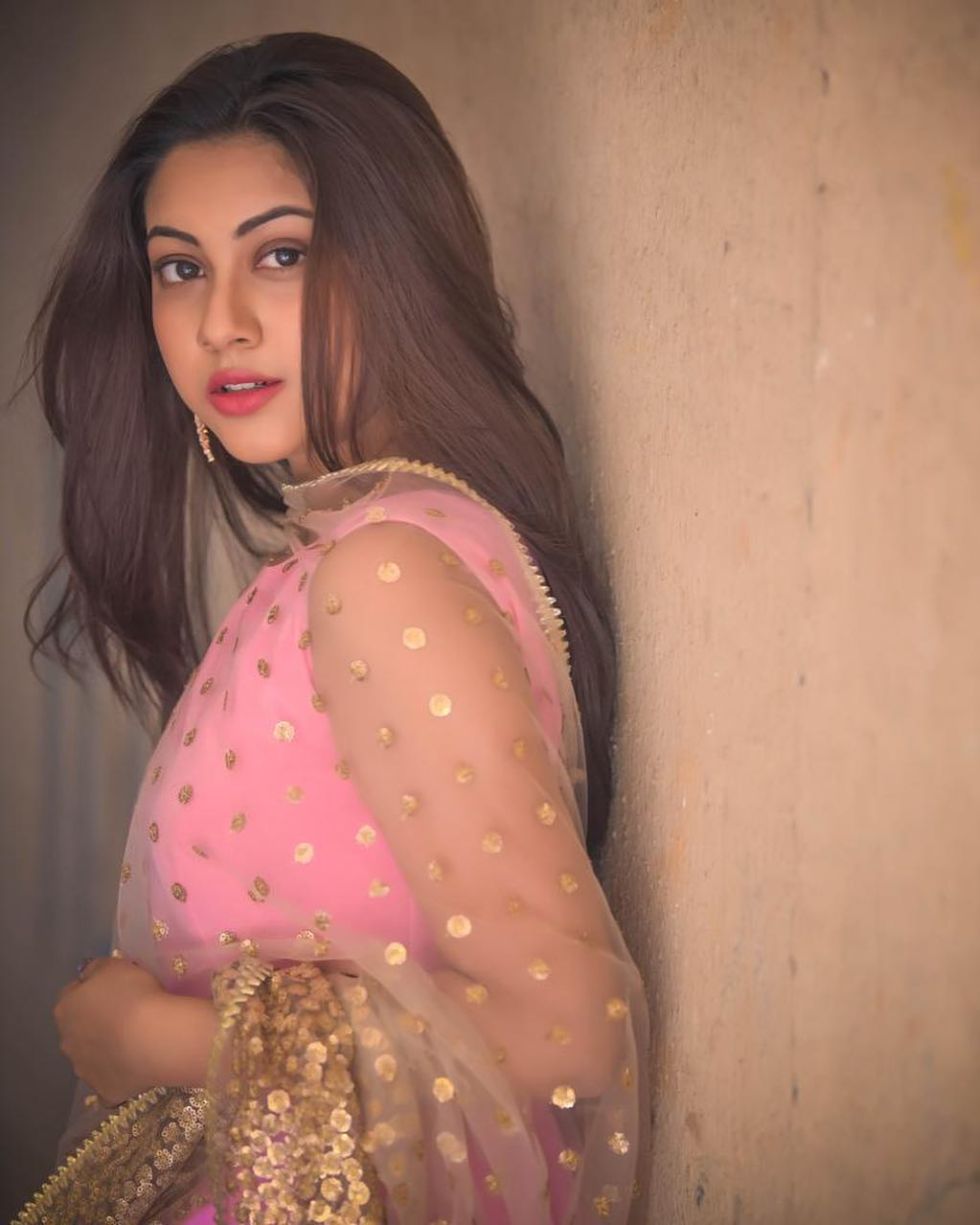
Shaikh in 2019

Shaikh started her career as a child actor at the age of 8 with Neer Bhare Tere Naina Devi. In 2012, she starred in Me Aajji Aur Sahib and Yeh Rishta Kya Kehlata Hai.

She was later seen in the show Na Bole Tum Na Maine Kuch Kaha as Rimjhim Bhatnagar. She was also seen as Khushboo in Khelti Hai Zindagi Aankh Micholi. and as Mishri in the show Diya Aur Baati Hum. She gained popularity with her portrayal of young Kaurwaki, as the wife of Emperor Ashoka in the show Chakravartin Ashoka Samrat opposite Siddharth Nigam.

In 2018, she guest-starred as Sanaya Seth on Colors TV's popular show Tu Aashiqui. From 2018 to 2021, she was seen in the lead role of Kalyani Malhar Rane opposite Sehban Azim in Zee TV's Tujhse Hai Raabta, and received the Gold Award for Debut in a Lead Role in 2019.

In 2020, she played Malala Yousafzai in the biopic Gul Makai.

In 2022, Reem Shaikh was seen as Paakhi Srivastava Raichand in Colors TV's Fanaa: Ishq Mein Marjawan opposite Zain Imam and Akshit Sukhija.

In 2023, she was seen in Colors TV's series Tere Ishq Mein Ghayal playing dual roles, Eisha Sharma and Kavya.

From 2024, she is seen in Colors TV show called Laughter Chefs which is highly applauded by audience.

== Filmography ==
=== Films ===
Year	Title	Role	Notes	Ref.
2016	Wazir	Kid	Cameo appearance	
2020	Gul Makai	Malala Yousafzai		
2021	Tuesdays and Fridays	Tanya		
2025	Homebound			

=== Television ===
Year	Title	Role	Notes	Ref.
2010	Neer Bhare Tere Naina Devi	Lakshmi / Devi		
2011	Na Aana Is Des Laado	Mausam		
2011	Ek Hazaaron Mein Meri Behna Hai	Young Manvi		
2012	Me Aajji Aur Sahib	Megha Sharma		
2012	The Suite Life of Karan & Kabir	Shipra		
2012	Yeh Rishta Kya Kehlata Hai	Young Prerna "Chikki" Singhania		
2013	Best of Luck Nikki	Sanya	Season 3	
2013	Na Bole Tum Na Maine Kuch Kaha	Young Rimjhim Bhatnagar	Season 2	
2013	Khelti Hai Zindagi Aankh Micholi	Khushboo		
2014	Goldie Ahuja Matric Pass	Sunaina Trivedi		
2014	Gumrah: End of Innocence	Smita		
2014	Devon Ke Dev...Mahadev	Young Mansa		
2015	Fear Files: Darr Ki Sacchi Tasvirein	Nivedita		
2015–2016	Diya Aur Baati Hum	Mishri Rathi		
2015–2016	Chakravartin Ashoka Samrat	Young Kaurwaki		
2017	Sankat Mochan Mahabali Hanuman	Vandevi		
2017	Tu Aashiqui	Sanaya Seth		
2017	Aye Zindagi	Aditi		
2018–2021	Tujhse Hai Raabta	Kalyani Deshmukh Rane		
2019	Khatra Khatra Khatra	Herself	Guest appearance	
2022	Fanaa: Ishq Mein Marjawaan	Paakhi Srivastava Raichand / Bulbul		
2023	Tere Ishq Mein Ghayal	Eisha Sharma / Kavya		
2023	Entertainment Ki Raat Housefull	Herself	Guest appearance	
2024–2025	Laughter Chefs – Unlimited Entertainment	Contestant	Seasons 1–2	
2026	Bigg Boss 20	Contestant	Wildcard entrant	

=== Web series ===
Year	Title	Role	Notes	Ref.
2022	Fanaa: Ishq Mein Marjawan: Aakhri Imtihaan	Paakhi Srivastava Raichand / Bulbul		
2024	Raisinghani VS Raisinghani	Ankita Pandey Raisinghani		
2024	Butterflies	Maya	Episode: "To Maya, from Rohan"	
2025	Ek Farzi Love Story	Kritika Sharma		

=== Music videos ===
Year	Title	Singer(s)	Ref.
2019	Sunda Ni	Jassi Dhaliwal	
2019	Teri Aankhen	Keshav Malhotra, Neha Malhotra	
2019	Tuu Jo Mila	Yasser Desai	
2020	Aaja Sohniye	Kshitij Vedi, Vaibhav Saxena	
2020	Future Jawai	Shubham Singh Solanki	
2020	Yaad Aayega	Abhay Jodhpurkar, R. Naaz	
2020	Ishq Tanha	Siddharth Bhavsar	
2020	Meri Hai Maa	Tarsh	
2021	Tum Bin	Palak Muchhal	
2021	Love To You	Ankit Tiwari, Rika	
2022	Minnatein	Mohammed Irfan	
2022	Humko Tumse Pyaar Hua	Soham Naik	
2022	Zindagi Bhar Tera Saath	Nihal Tauro, Biswaa	
2022	Bahut Bewafa Hai Wo	Javed Ali	
2023	Meherbaan	Sonu Kakkar, Abhijeet Srivastava	
2023	Tera Hi Nasha	Shekhar Khanijo	
2023	Jo Haal Dil Ka	Dev Negi, Priya Saraiya	
2024	O Mere Humnava	Sonu Nigam, Teesha Nigam	
2025	Khulle Aasmaan	Juss X MixSingh	
2025	Bichadna	Faheem Abdullah	
2025	Dil Darbadar	Arpan Singh	
2025	Jisse Tu Kare Pyaar	Yasser Desai	

== Awards and nominations ==
Year	Award	Category	Work	Result	Ref.
2019	Gold Awards	Debut in Lead Role – Female	Tujhse Hai Raabta	Won	
2022	Indian Television Academy Awards	Popular Actress – Drama	Fanaa: Ishq Mein Marjawan	Nominated	
