= Har Bahu Ki Yahi Kahani Sasumaa Ne Meri Kadar Na Jaani =

Indian drama television series

- Also known as: Sasumaa Ne Meri Kadar Na Jaani
- Genre: Drama
- Created by: 3 Musketeers
- Story by: Gazala Nargis; Sonal Ganatra; Bhavna Vyas; Dialogues; Anand
- Directed by: Manish Singh
- Creative director: Menka Rani Chaudhary
- Starring: Akshit Sukhija; Anushka Merchande
- Opening theme: "Sasumaa Ne Meri Kadar Na Jaani"
- Composer: Ved Sharma
- Country of origin: India
- Original language: Hindi
- No. of seasons: 1
- No. of episodes: 130

Production
- Producers: Nikil Sinha; Kutti Padmini
- Cinematography: Indraneel Singha
- Editors: Satya Sharma; Sumanth Sharma
- Camera setup: Multi-Camera
- Running time: 22-24 minutes
- Production company: Triangle Film Company

Original release
- Network: Dangal
- Release: 23 October 2023 – 21 March 2024

Har Bahu Ki Yahi Kahani Sasumaa Ne Meri Kadar Na Jaani (transl. Every Daughter–In–Law Has The Same Story Mother–In–Law Did Not Understand My Importance) also Known as Sasumaa Ne Meri Kadar Na Jaani is an Indian drama television series produced by Triangle Film Company and premiered on 23 October 2023 on Dangal. It stars Akshit Sukhija and Anushka Merchande.

== Plot ==
Pallavi longs to read more, but her parents forbid it until after marriage. She hopes her future in-laws will be more modern and allow her to pursue her passions. Meanwhile, Babli Devi hopes for a daughter-in-law who will serve her like a maid. Only time will tell whose dreams will come true.

== Cast ==
=== Main ===
- Akshit Sukhija as Arnav Shastri: Pallavi's husband;
- Anushka Merchande as Pallavi Arnav Shastri (née Pathak): Arnav's wife;

=== Recurring ===
- Salman Shaikh as Shiva: Suhasini's son
- Sahil Singh Sambyal as Pratham Madan Pathak: Pallavi and Pavitra's elder brother
- Jiten Lalwani as Shri Purshottam Shastri: Arnav's father; Babli Devi's husband
- Purva Parag as Kanchan Pathak : Pallavi and Pratham's mother
- Sucheta Khanna as Babli Devi Shastri : Arnav's step-mother
- Milan Singh as Jhilmil : Arnav's elder sister
- Hemakshi Ujjain as Godavari Pathak : Pallavi's stepmother
- Ipsitha Tanjea as Rimjhim Shastri : Arnav's younger sister
- Alka Singh as Priyanka Shastri : Arnav's sister-in-law
- Bobby Khanna as Madan Pathak : Pallavi, Pavitra and Pratham's father
- Darsh Agarwal as Bittu
- Gultesham Khan as Anand
- Seema Azmi as Suhasini : Shiva's Mother
- Ashutosh Tiwari as Shashwat
- Sneha Bhawsar as Pavitra Madan Pathak: Kanchan and Madan's daughter

== Production ==
=== Development ===
The series was initially titled as Sasuji Tune Meri Kadar Na Jaani. But Later it was a changed to Har Bahu Ki Yahi Kahani Sasumaa Ne Meri Kadar Na Jaani. The Show Replaced Sindoor Ki Keemat 2.

=== Release ===
Akshit Sukhija and Anushka Merchande were signed as the lead.The first promo was released in October 2023 featuring Sucheta Khanna and Anushka Merchande. It was replaced by the television series Deewani on March 19, 2024. The remaining episodes of this serial were aired at the 11:30 PM time slot.
