= Manpasand Ki Shaadi =

Indian romantic drama television series

- Genre: Drama; Romantic
- Created by: Sooraj Barjatya
- Starring: Esha Suryawanshi; Akshun Mahajan; Akshit Sukhija; Milind Gawali
- Country of origin: India
- Original language: Hindi
- No. of seasons: 1
- No. of episodes: 80

Production
- Producers: Sooraj Barjatya; Devansh Barjatya
- Camera setup: Multi-camera
- Running time: 20–25 minutes
- Production company: Rajshri Productions

Original release
- Network: Colors TV
- Release: 11 August – 28 November 2025

Manpasand Ki Shaadi is an Indian Hindi-language television drama romantic series that aired on 11 August 2025 to 28 November 2025 on Colors TV and streams digitally on JioHotstar. It produced by Sooraj Barjatya under Rajshri Productions. It stars Esha Suryawanshi, Akshun Mahajan and Akshit Sukhija.

== Plot ==
Arohi Shinde is a Marathi girl and lives in hostel of Indore due to her study. Her parents want to get her married off with Sagar. But she never wants to marry him because she believes that Sagar isn't correct for her. Her father Rajaram gives her a month to find a perfect boy. Now she is looking for a boy who everyone will say is not just the son-in-law of this house, but also the son. For this, Arohi posts her photo in a matrimonial site with the help of her friend Ritika. Her profile is chosen by Abhishek Dewan who is from a powerful family. His mother Anuradha likes Arohi as she is also Marathi. But one day, when Arohi goes to meet her another friend Atharva, Abhishek insults her in drunkard. At this, she becomes angry and slaps him. That's why, Abhishek decides to take revenge from her. So, he frames Arohi in a false case. However, with the help of her Matron Devika, she proves herself innocent. Later the two fall in love and get married and live happily ever after.

== Cast ==
=== Main ===
- Esha Suryawanshi as Arohi Dewan (nee Shinde) : Sharda and Rajaram's daughter; Abhishek's wife
- Akshun Mahajan / Akshit Sukhija as Abhishek Dewan : Kailashnath and Anuradha's son; Aarohi's husband

=== Recurring ===
- Aditi Shetty as Parineeta
- Milind Gawali as Rajaram Shinde
- Suchitra Bandekar as Sharda Shinde
- Sameer Vijayan as Mr. Shinde
- Swati Deval as Savita Shinde
- Iravati Nadguda as Bharti
- Abhijeet Kelkar as Vilas
- Prince Kazim as Jinku
- Avinash Wadhawan as Kailashnath Dewan
- Gungun Uprari as Anuradha Dewan
- Sailessh Gulabani as Kundan Dewan
- Shilpa Tulaskar as Sarojini Dewan
- Sandhya Gemawat as Kanika Dewan
- Ankit Narang as Sagar
- Rishabh Shukla as Ghanshyam
- Unknown as Ritika
- Unknown as Atharva
- Jaswinder Gardner as Devika Dewan

== Productions ==
=== Development ===
In August 2025, Colors TV announced a new series titled Manpasand Ki Shaadi.

=== Casting ===
Sailessh Gulabani was roped in the show, playing Kundan Dewan. In October 2025, Akshun Mahajan who playing Abhishek Dewan quit the show and replaced by Akshit Sukhija.
