= Mastaangi =

2016 Indian TV series

- Promotional Title Card
- Also known as: Mastaangi
- Genre: Youth show; Romance; Mystery; Thriller
- Screenplay by: Prashant Bhatt; Aseem Arora; Karishmaa Oluchi; Sharad Tripathi
- Directed by: Aapar Gupta; Saurabh Arora; Prince Dhiman
- Creative directors: Ashish Batra; Harsha Shanbag
- Music by: Lalit Sen; Pranaay Pradhaan
- Country of origin: India
- Original language: Hindi
- No. of seasons: 1
- No. of episodes: 119

Production
- Producers: Prashant Bhatt; Sanjay K Memane
- Production location: Pune
- Cinematography: Shariq S Khan
- Editors: Raj Kumar Chaturvedi; Anurag Singh
- Camera setup: Multi-camera
- Running time: 22 minutes
- Production companies: Studio B&M Pvt Ltd

Original release
- Network: Channel V India
- Release: 18 January – 30 June 2016

Mastaangi (English: Playfulness) is an Indian television series that premiered on Channel V India on 18 January 2016. The show is about a couple whose love story comes to a tragic end with both of them having untimely deaths. They meet again in a new life only to uncover the mystery of their past life and rekindle their love.

== Plot ==
In 1995 a young couple named Kabir, a RAW agent, and Udita (taken name), an ISI agent, meet mysterious deaths in Pune.

They meet each other 21 years after that incident, certainly through reincarnation and named Karan and Ria. Ria has irregular heartbeat and often has mysterious nightmares about her previous life. They study in St. Stephen's college, Pune. Individually and in many instances when one comes face to face with the other, they recall their past life incidents. Anushka, another RAW agent and partner of Kabir in a mission that year has also taken a rebirth and is named Anaita. Anushka had crush on Kabir. She was involved in their tragic deaths. Anaita, who is now Ria's best friend, studies in the same college. "Operation Tabahi" mastermind ISI Commander Zuber, too, was connected with their past life.

Zuber, under the name Ishaan, lives in Pune as an industrialist just to fulfill that unaccomplished operation. Coincidentally, he is one of the members of board of trustees of St. Stephen's college and his son Yuvraj (given name) studies in that college. Ria's father is a psychiatrist who tries to figure out Ria's disease. Anaita stays in Ria's house in Pune. Karan lives in Pune with his brother and sister-in-law. His brother works in a newspaper agency. During a mask party at college when Euro tries to harass Ria, Karqn starts beating him but stops immediately when Ria refers to him as "Kabir". After the incident, Ria and Anaita become friends with Karan. Su, Vanessa, Jiggs and Trumpet are also their friends. Zuber plots to restart Mission Tabahi to destroy India.

Anaita gets attracted to Karan and as a result of her obsession, develops hatred towards Ria, whom Karan is attracted to. Anaita feels that Ria is framing herself to be innocent and kind while portraying her as the bad one. The friendship of the two are spoiled not due to any of Ria's doings but Anushka's hatred towards Udita in the past life.

In the end, they all get to know about Zuber's plans. Anaita helps Karan and Ria. Veer Singh helps them to discover their past lives. Anushka killed Kabir and Udita. Eventually, they come together to fight Zuber and Yuvraj is killed. Finally, everyone is saved and Anaita and Veer confess their feelings for each other. Jiggs and Su also unite. Karan and Ria re-unite and lived happily ever after.

== Cast ==
- Aakash Talwar as RAW Agent Kabir Kapoor / Karan "K" Malhotra
- Swati Kapoor as ISI Agent Udita / Ria Sareen
- Himani Sahani aa RAW Agent Anushka Khanna / Anaita "Anu" Shroff
- Raaj Singh Arora as ISI Commander Zuber Akhtar Khan / Ishaan Rai Singhania
- Ankit Raj as Veer Singh Shekhawat
- Rutpanna Aishwarya Sethi as Suhani
- Bhumika Gurung as Vanessa
- Nitin Bhatia as Jignesh "Jiggs"
- Nidha Bhat as Trumpet
- Pankaj Bhalla as Yuvraj "Euro" Rai Singhania / Yunnus Khan
- Viren Singh Rathore as Ricky Nanda
- Jyoti Gauba as Mrs. Khanna
- Tithi Raaj as ISI Agent Sophia
- Parveen Kaur as Psychologist
