= Ankit Narang =

Indian television actor (born 1989)

- Born: 3 April 1989 (age 37); Surat, Gujarat, India
- Occupation: Actor
- Years active: 2011–present
- Known for: Pavitra Rishta; Zindagi Mere Ghar Aana
- Spouse: Valentina Chopra (m. 2022)

Ankit Narang (born 3 April 1989) is an Indian television actor. He is best known for playing the character of Soham Deshmukh in the popular soap opera Pavitra Rishta which aired on Zee TV. He was last seen in Zindagi Mere Ghar Aana.

== Life and family ==
Narang was born on 3 April 1989 in Surat, Gujarat. On 18 Jan 2024, Narang married his girlfriend Valentina Chopra, who is a casting director / in-house creative in Rajshri Productions.

== Career ==
Narang started his acting career in 2011 with Life OK series Tum Dena Saath Mera. He then played prominent roles in several popular hindi television serials such as Pavitra Rishta, Bade Achhe Lagte Hain, Bhaage Re Mann and Divya Drishti.

In 2021, he was seen playing the parallel lead role of Angad Sakhuja opposite Chestha Mehta in Zindagi Mere Ghar Aana. He is currently seen playing the main antagonist "Sagar" in Rajshri Productions Manpasand Ki Shaadi on Colors TV.

== Filmography ==
=== Television ===
Year(s)	Title	Role	Notes
2011–2012	Tum Dena Saath Mera	Manan Sharma	
2012–2014	Pavitra Rishta	Soham Manav Deshmukh / Vishnu Lala / Ragghav Mahatre	
2013–2014	Bade Achhe Lagte Hain	Khush Ram Kapoor	
2014	Love by Chance	Harsh	
2014	Box Cricket League 1	Contestant	Players in Rowdy Bangalore
2015–2016	Bhaage Re Mann	Ashutosh / Ass-U-Tosh	
2019	Divya Drishti	Sunny Shergill	
2020	Ek Anokhi Rakshak – Naagkanya	Krish	
2021–2022	Zindagi Mere Ghar Aana	Angad Sakhuja	
2022	Rajjo	Vicky	
2025	Manpasand Ki Shaadi	Sagar	
