= Shubharambh =

Indian 2019 television drama

- Genre: Romance; Drama
- Created by: Sumeet Hukamchand Mittal; Shashi Mittal
- Developed by: Pankhuri Gangwal
- Written by: Vaishali Naik
- Starring: See below
- Voices of: Antara Mitara; Tushar Joshi
- Opening theme: Shubharambh
- Country of origin: India
- Original language: Hindi
- No. of seasons: 1
- No. of episodes: 175

Production
- Producers: Shashi Mittal; Sumeet Hukamchand Mittal; Om Ahmed
- Camera setup: Multi-camera
- Running time: 20–24 minutes
- Production company: Shashi Sumeet Productions

Original release
- Network: Colors TV
- Release: 2 December 2019 – 13 November 2020

Shubharambh (transl. Auspicious beginning) is an Indian Hindi-language romantic drama television series. Produced by Shashi Sumeet Productions, it aired from 2 December 2019 to 13 November 2020 on Colors TV. It starred Mahima Makwana and Akshit Sukhija in the lead roles. The show was developed and written by Pankhuri Gangwal and Vaishali Naik.

== Plot ==
Raja Reshammiya, a son of his wealthy family lacks self-confidence. Sharp and pretty, Rani Dave hails from a poor family. They meet and fall in love. Thinking the Daves are rich, Raja's mom Asha sends a marriage proposal. After the marriage, Asha finds out Rani is poor.

Later on, Rani and Raja experience several situations, as Raja's uncle and aunt want them to be under their control. Meanwhile, Kesha, Raja's uncle and Aunt's daughter falls for Ustav's Boss, and decides to marry him without informing her family. She was pregnant. Later on, Utsav reveals the truth of his boss to Kesha. His boss was already married. Heartbroken, Kesha comes back home with Utsav's advice.

With misunderstanding, the family blames Utsav, except Rani. When she enquires Utsav, he agreed the blame. Kesha's father decides that she must leave the house as she did not obey his wish for her marriage with his business friend, Mukesh Shah's son.

After that, Raja and Rani participate in a competition of shoemakers called 'Mera Jutha hai Hindustani' as the winner of the competition gets a loan from the government to start their shoe factory. They both fail in the selection round. So, they decide to go with the wild card entry and along with them Kesha participates, as she had a deal with her father that if Raja and Rani were out of the competition, she can return home. So, with Utsav's trust she goes to competition.

Meanwhile, Raja gets badly injured in the eye while he makes the soles of the shoes with a chemical glue. Both Raja and Rani work hard to win the competition as a false statement was given for not attending the interview with their name that they will be separated if they lose the competition. They work very hard.

Competitor Mihika and Kesha also tried very hard to make them lose but failed. Kesha fakes her illness and after seeing Raja's kindness, she tells the truth on how she tried to sabotage them. Raja is hurt on his foot and they both try to go to the competition. Raja's uncle and aunt send goons after them. Raja gets injured and tells Rani to go to the competition. Raja and Rani won the competition.

As Raja gets injured due to Gunvant's evil plot Rani's ex-lover Mihir enter their life as his doctor much to her dismay. Mihir blackmails her to marry him and he will save Raja. A helpless Rani agrees. After Raja's second surgery, Rani tells the family the truth. She decided to commit suicide by drinking poison. Mihir sees how much Rani loves Raja and leaves Rani. Raja is recovered.

=== 1 year later ===
Raja and Rani have become very successful. Raja's uncle and aunt want to kill Rani. His uncle decides to set them on fire, but instead both him and his wife are caught in the circle of fire. Raja and Rani jump in the circle trying to save them. His uncle and aunt gives the keys of his father's shop to Raja and Rani, and finally, the family reunites and takes a family selfie together.

== Cast ==
=== Main ===
- Akshit Sukhija as Raja Reshammiya: Asha and Dhanwant's son; Hitendra, Mehul and Keshavi's cousin; Rani's husband (2019−2020)
- Mahima Makwana as Rani Dave Reshammiya: Vrinda and Chagan's younger daughter; Utsav and Vandita's sister; Raja's wife (2019–2020)

=== Recurring ===
- Jiten Lalwani as Gunwant Reshammiya: Dhanwant's brother; Kirtida's husband; Hitendra, Mehul and Keshavi's father (2019−2020)
- Chhaya Vora as Kirtida Reshammiya: Gunwant's wife; Hitendra, Mehul and Keshavi's mother (2019−2020)
- Pallavi Rao as Asha Reshammiya: Dhanwant's widow; Raja's mother (2019−2020)
- Rakesh Kukreti as Dhanwant Reshammiya: Gunwant's brother; Asha's husband; Raja's father (2019) (Dead)
- Padmesh Pandit as Chagan Dave: Vrinda's husband; Utsav, Vandita and Rani's father (2019–2020)
- Shubhangi Latkar/Vaishnavi Mahant as Vrinda Dave: Chagan's wife; Utsav, Vandita and Rani's mother (2019−2020)/(2020)
- Meghan Jadhav as Utsav Dave: Vrinda and Chagan's son; Vandita and Rani's brother; Keshavi's husband (2019−2020)
- Vaibhavi Mahajan as Keshavi "Kesha" Reshammiya Dave: Gunwant and Kirtida's daughter; Hitendra and Mehul's sister; Raja's cousin; Utsav's wife (2019−2020)
- Vaidehi Dharmecha as Vandita "Chukki" Dave Shah: Vrinda and Chagan's elder daughter; Utsav and Rani's sister; Mahendra's wife (2019–2020)
- Rahul Patel as Mahendra "Popat" Shah: Vandita's husband (2019–2020)
- Vikas Tripathi/Meer Ali as Hitendra "Hitank" Reshammiya: Gunwant and Kirtida's elder son; Mehul and Keshavi's brother; Raja's cousin; Darshana's husband (2019–2020)/(2020)
- Dipna Patel/Zalak Desai as Darshana Reshammiya: Hitendra's wife (2019−2020)/(2020)
- Aarjav Trivedi as Mehul Reshammiya: Gunwant and Kirtida's younger son; Hitendra and Keshavi's brother; Raja's cousin; Jharna's husband (2019−2020)
- Astha Agarwal as Jharna Reshammiya: Mehul's wife (2019−2020)
- Roopa Divetia as Sharmini Reshammiya (2019–2020)
- Karan Mehra as Bharat Hasija: Judge at "Mera Joota Hai Hindustani" competition (2020)
- Deepti Bhatnagar Badoni as Meena Nayak: Judge at "Mera Joota Hai Hindustani" competition (2020)
- Prachi Bohara as Sweety Singhaniya (2020)
- Helly Thakkar as Mihika Raichand (2020)
- Raaj Bhavsar as Aashish Patel (2020)
- Shagun Pandey as Dr. Mihir Doshi: Rani's possessive lover; Raja's doctor, a Neurosurgeon (October 2020-November 2020)

== Production ==
The production and airing of the show was halted indefinitely on 19 March 2020 due to the COVID-19 outbreak in India. The filming was expected to resume on 1 April 2020 but could not and the series was last broadcast on 1 April 2020 when the remaining episodes were aired. The production resumed on 25 June 2020. Owing the halt, the cast of the series took 25% payment cut for six months. On 27 September, the shooting halted when Akshit Sukhija tested positive for COVID-19. The storyline was tweaked during Akshit Sukhija break. Akshit Sukhija resumed shooting on 12 October 2020.

== Reception ==
=== Ratings ===
According to BARC ratings, with an impression of 3,539, the show entered the top 20 list in week 49 of 2019. Simultaneously, it has maintained its place in week 1 of 2020 and week 3 of 2020 occupying 19th spot respectively in all India Hindi GEC shows with the ratings of 1.7 and 1.6, respectively. The ratings kept on fluctuating with a rating of 1.4 however it returned to the top 20 list in week 9, 2020 and continued till week 10 and week 11, 2020. In week 12, 2020 the show entered the top 10 chart.
