= Jyoti Gauba =

Indian television and film actress

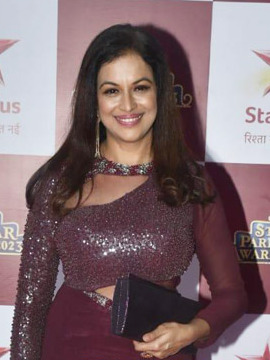
- Jyoti Gauba in 2023
- Born: 21 June 1974 (age 52)
- Occupation: Actress
- Years active: 1998–present
- Notable work: Piyaa Albela, Ek Hasina Thi, Kasam, Imlie, etc.
- Children: 2

Jyoti Gauba is an Indian television and film actress. She had done over 700 commercials till date and made her film debut with the film Idiot Box. She was also seen in the films like Take It Easy, Thoda Pyaar Thoda Magic.

She has featured in many television shows like Ek Hasina Thi, Kavach... Kaali Shaktiyon Se, Badii Devrani, Maat Pitaah Ke Charnon Mein Swarg, Agent Raghav – Crime Branch, Love Marriage Ya Arranged Marriage, Ek Mutthi Aasmaan, Kasam Tere Pyaar Ki, Hello Friends, Phir Subah Hogi and Mastaangi - One Love Story Two Lifetimes.

She was last seen as Supriya Vyas in Piyaa Albela. She portrayed the role of Anuja Chaturvedi in Star Plus's Imlie.

== Filmography ==
=== Films ===
Year	Film	Role	Reference
2008	Thoda Pyaar Thoda Magic	Ranbeer's mother	
2010	Idiot Box	Anekta Kapoor	
2015	Take It Easy	Seema	
2023	Bholaa	Dr. Surbhi	
2025	De De Pyaar De 2	Aditya's mother	
TBA	3 Monkeys	Sudha	

=== Television ===
Year	Serial	Role	Ref(s)
2009–2010	Maat Pitaah Ke Charnon Mein Swarg	Yashoda Satyanarayan Tripathi	
2012	Love Marriage Ya Arranged Marriage	Mansi's mother	
2012	Phir Subah Hogi	Thakurayin	
2013	Amita Ka Amit	Varsha Patel	
2013	CID	Shilpa	
2013	Ek Mutthi Aasmaan	Gauri Singhania	
2014	Ek Hasina Thi	Suchitra Goenka	
2015	Badii Devrani	Kaushalya Poddar	
2015	Agent Raghav – Crime Branch	Arundhati Devi	
2016	Kavach... Kaali Shaktiyon Se	Bhavya, a fairy	
2016	Kasam Tere Pyaar Ki	Sharda Khurana	
2016	Mastaangi - One Love Story Two Lifetimes	Yashwanti Khanna	
2017–2018	Piyaa Albela	Supriya Vyas	
2018–2019	Karn Sangini	Queen Shubra	
2019	Ek Bhram...Sarvagun Sampanna	Anuradha Ashok Sharma	
2019	Naagin 4	Queen Vividha	
2020–2024	Imlie	Anuja "Anu" Dev Chaturvedi	
2022–2023	Katha Ankahee	Kavita Kailash Garewal	
2023–2024	Do Chutki Sindoor	Jaya Pandey	
2024	Qayaamat Se Qayaamat Tak	Radha Sahariya	
2024—2025	Gehna - Zewar Ya Zanjeer	Kamla Jaisingh	
2025–2026	Mangal Lakshmi	Gayatri Nigam	

=== Web series ===
Year	Title	Role	Platform	Notes
2020	State Of Siege: 26/11		ZEE5	
2019	Kota Factory	Vaibhav Pandey's mother	YouTube (Season 1); Netflix (Season 2)	
2023	Kafas	Deepali Guha	SonyLIV	
