= Dil Ko Tumse Pyaar Hua =

Indian television series

- Genre: Family drama Social issue
- Developed by: Pradeep Panicker
- Written by: Srabasti Basu; Sayan Chowdhury
- Screenplay by: Srabasti Basu
- Story by: Srabasti Basu
- Directed by: Jasbir Saroj Bhaati
- Creative director: Garima Dimri
- Starring: Aditi Tripathi; Akshit Sukhija
- Country of origin: India
- Original language: Hindi
- No. of seasons: 1
- No. of episodes: 216

Production
- Executive producers: Sreeparna; Nibedita; (SVF)
- Producers: Shrikant Mohta; Mahendra Soni
- Production location: Mumbai
- Cinematography: Dipankar Saha
- Editor: Babulal Sau
- Camera setup: Multi-camera
- Running time: 22 minutes
- Production company: Shree Venkatesh Films

Original release
- Network: StarPlus
- Release: 15 July 2024 – 17 February 2025

Related
- Karuthamuthu; Anurager Chhowa

Dil Ko Tumse Pyaar Hua (transl. My Heart Fell In Love With You) is an Indian Hindi-language drama television series that premiered on 15 July 2024 to 17 February 2025 on StarPlus. Produced under the banner of Shree Venkatesh Films, it stars Aditi Tripathi as Deepika and Akshit Sukhija as Chirag. It is the third official Hindi remake of the Malayalam TV series Karuthamuthu.

== Plot ==
Set against the vibrant backdrop of Jodhpur, the story follows Deepika, a kind and resilient woman often disregarded for her dark complexion. Challenging societal prejudices, Dr. Chirag Mittal sees beyond appearances and falls in love with Deepika's warmth and generosity, highlighting the essence of inner beauty over outward appearances. Their love blossoms into marriage, but their bond is soon tested when Chirag's obsessive friend, Mishka, enters their lives like a storm. Mishka's presence casts a dark shadow over their relationship, testing their bond in ways they never anticipated.

== Cast ==
=== Main ===
- Aditi Tripathi as
  - Deepika Agarwal Mittal: A florist; Yashwant's elder daughter; Shobha’s step-daughter; Janhvi’s step-sister; Chirag’s wife; Chandni and Ragini’s mother; Mishka's rival (2024–2025)
  - Mrs. Agarwal: Yashwant’s wife, Deepika’s mother and doppelgänger; Chandni and Ragini’s grandmother (uncredited - photo representation- dead)
- Akshit Sukhija as Dr. Chirag Mittal: Lavanya and Omkar's elder son; Payal and Prithvi’s brother; Deepika’s husband; Chandni and Ragini’s father; Mishka's College friend (2024–2025)
- Shivani Jha / Simran Budharup as Dr. Mishka "Mish" Rathore: Chirag's college friend and obsessive love interest; Deepika's rival (2024) / (2024—2025)

=== Recurring ===
- Pratish Vora as Yashwant "Yash" Agarwal: Mrs Agarwal's widower; Shobha's husband; Deepika and Janhvi's father; Chandni and Ragini's grandfather (2024)
- Niilam Paanchal as Shobha Agarwal: Yashwant's second wife; Janhvi's mother; Deepika's step mother; Chandni and Ragini's step grandmother (2024)
- Shubhaavi Choksey as Lavanya Maheshwari Mittal: Omkar's wife; Payal, Chirag and Prithvi's mother; Roshni, Chandni and Ragini’s grandmother (2024–2025)
- Avinash Wadhawan as Omkar Mittal: Ashutosh's brother; Lavanya's husband; Payal, Chirag and Prithvi's father; Roshni, Chandni and Ragini’s grandfather (2024–2025)
- Preetika Chauhan as Payal Mittal Verma: Lavanya and Omkar's daughter; Chirag and Prithvi's sister; Roshni's mother (2024)
- Keshav Mehta as Prithvi Mittal: Lavanya and Omkar's younger son; Payal, and Chirag's brother; Janhvi's husband (2024–2025)
- Urvashi Pardeshi as Janhvi Agarwal Mittal: Shobha and Yashwant's daughter; Deepika's half sister; Chirag's ex love interest; Prithvi's wife (2024–2025)
- Siyona Joisar as Chandni "Chandu" Mittal: Deepika and Chirag's elder daughter; Ragini's twin sister (2024–2025)
- Aaradhya Jha as Ragini "Rags" Mittal: Deepika and Chirag's younger daughter; Chandni's twin sister (2024–2025)
- Jay Pathak as Ashutosh "Ashu" Mittal: Omkar's brother; Neelima's husband; Saloni's father (2024–2025)
- Yashu Dhiman as Neelima Mittal: Ashutosh's wife; Saloni's mother (2024–2025)
- Rupali Thapa as Saloni Mittal: Neelima and Ashutosh's daughter (2024)
- Ishaan Singh Manhas as Siddharth Oswal: Deepika’s sworn brother; Shivani's husband; (2024–2025)
- Shweta Ojha as Shivani Oswal: Siddharth's wife (2024–2025)
- Unknown as Baldev: Deepika's brother figure; Chitra's husband (2024–2025)
- Rupali Upadhyay as Chitra: Baldev's wife (2024–2025)

=== Guest Appearances ===
- Kanwar Dhillon as Sachin Deshmukh from Udne Ki Aasha (2024)

== Production ==
=== Casting ===
Aditi Tripathi and Akshit Sukhija were cast as the leads, Deepika and Dr. Chirag, respectively. Shubhaavi Choksey was cast as Lavanya Mittal, a character suffering from childhood trauma. Shivani Jha was initially cast to play Dr. Mishka but was replaced within five days by Simran Budharup.
