= Akshit Sukhija =

Indian television actor (born 1997)

- Born: 18 November 1997 (age 28); Punjab, India
- Occupations: Actor; Model
- Years active: 2019–present
- Known for: Shubharambh

Akshit Sukhija (born 18 November 1997) is an Indian actor who is best known as Raja Reshammiya in Shubharambh and Dr. Ishaan Tandon in Fanaa: Ishq Mein Marjawan.

== Early life ==
Akshit Sukhija was born on 18 November 1997 in Punjab, India. In 2003, he shifted to New Delhi and completed his schooling. Later, he pursued a course in journalism at Vivekananda Institute of Professional Studies (VIPS), New Delhi.

== Career ==
In 2018, Sukhija shifted to Mumbai to pursue his career in acting and began his career as a model. Sukhija made his acting debut as Arnav Shukhla in March 2019 with Voot web-series, Silsila Badalte Rishton Ka Season 2 opposite Aneri Vajani.

In December 2019, he got his first lead role as Raja Reshammiya in the Colors TV show Shubh Aarambh.

In January 2022, Sukhija was seen as Ishaan Tandon, an oncologist, in Colors TV's Fanaa: Ishq Mein Marjawan opposite Reem Shaikh. In July 2022, he quit the show.

From February 2023 to April 2023, he portrayed Agastya Srivastav in Dangal TV's Piya Abhimani. In May 2023, he started portraying Yuvraj Sharma in Sony TV's Bade Achhe Lagte Hain 3.

From July 2024 to February 2025, he portrayed Dr. Chirag Mittal opposite Aditi Tripathi in StarPlus's Dil Ko Tumse Pyaar Hua.

Recently, he has started his own production house named as "Filmi Chor" and released 2 short series "NaukariDotGone" and #BandBajaBekaar" on Youtube .

== Filmography ==
=== Films ===
Year	Title	Role	Notes	Ref.
2022	Day: 180	Akshit	Short film	
2023	Yaariyan 2	Stuart		

=== Television ===
Year	Title	Role	Notes	Ref.
2019–2020	Shubharambh	Raja Reshammiya		
2021	Lakshmi Ghar Aayi	Raghav Kumar		
2022	Fanaa: Ishq Mein Marjawan	Dr. Ishaan Tandon		
2023	Piya Abhimani	Agastya Srivastav		
2023	Bade Achhe Lagte Hain 3	Yuvraj Sharma		
2023–2024	Har Bahu Ki Yahi Kahani Sasumaa Ne Meri Kadar Na Jaani	Arnav Shastri		
2024–2025	Dil Ko Tumse Pyaar Hua	Dr. Chirag Mittal		
2025	Manpasand Ki Shaadi	Abhishek Dewan		

==== Special appearances ====
Year	Title	Role	Ref.
2019	Bigg Boss 13	Raja Reshammiya	
2019	Wakhra Swag 2020	Raja Reshammiya	
2020	Ishq Mein Marjawan 2	Raja Reshammiya	
2020	Shaandar Ravivaar	Himself	
2022	Bigg Boss 15	Dr. Ishaan Tandon	
2024	Ghum Hai Kisikey Pyaar Meiin	Dr. Chirag Mittal	
2024	Udne Ki Aasha	Dr. Chirag Mittal	

=== Web series ===
Year	Title	Role	Notes	Ref.
2019	Silsila Badalte Rishton Ka	Arnav Shukla		
2022	Janpad Gonda	Vishnu Pandit		
2024	Dil Dosti Dilemma	Armaan		
2025	The Return of Tiger	Abhinav Gadhwal		
2025	Let's Play Blind	Mohak		
2026	Pyaar On Road	Akshay	Microdrama	

=== Music videos ===
Year	Title	Singer(s)	Ref.
2022	Range Balliye	Prabh Jot	
2023	Abr-e-Karam	Altamash Faridi	
2024	Raah mein unse mulaqat ho gayi	Nitin FCP	

== See also ==
- List of Indian actors
- List of Indian television actors
