= Aakash Talwar =

Indian television actor

- Born: 9 October 1992 (age 33); Amritsar, Punjab, India
- Occupation: Actor
- Years active: 2014–present
- Known for: Mastaangi; Shakti

Aakash Talwar (born 9 October 1992) is an Indian television actor. Since beginning his career in 2014, he has appeared in over 30 TV shows.

He made his television debut with Pavitra Bandhan, but gained a breakthrough playing Varun Verma in Kaisi Yeh Yaariaan. He rose to fame playing the lead role of Kabir Kapoor in Mastaangi and further appeared in serials like Thapki Pyar Ki, Ichhapyaari Naagin, Savitri Devi and Daayan. From 2020 to 2021, Talwar achieved huge recognition with his grey-shaded turned negative role of Daljeet Singh in Colors TV's fourth longest running TV soap opera Shakti and was also seen in Colors TV's other shows, including Naagin 5 as Tapish Singhania and Molkki as Arjun Bajwa. Most recently, he made a special appearance in Colors TV's Fanaa: Ishq Mein Marjawan as Rajiv.

== Television ==
| Year | Show | Role |
|---|---|---|
| 2014 | Pavitra Bandhan | Dr. Sameer Basu |
| 2014 | Pyaar Tune Kya Kiya | |
| 2014 | Nadaan Parindey Ghar Aaja | |
| 2015 | Code Red Taalash | Rahul Vaidya |
| 2015 | Halla Bol | |
| 2015 | Aahat 6 | |
| 2015 | MTV Webbed | |
| 2015 | Yeh Hai Aashiqui | |
| 2015 | Ishq Ka Rang Safed | Ram Chaturvedi |
| 2015 | Kaisi Yeh Yaariyan 2 | Varun Verma |
| 2016 | Mastaangi | Kabir Kapoor |
| 2016 | Thapki Pyar Ki | Janardhan/John Jaiswal |
| 2017 | Ichhapyaari Naagin | Mayuresh Singh |
| 2017 | Ek Tha Raja Ek Thi Rani | Kunder Kumar |
| 2018 | Savitri Devi College & Hospital | Satish Ahuja |
| 2018 | Laal Ishq | Devang Roy |
| 2018–2019 | Daayan | Harshvardhan/Harsh Morya |
| 2020–2021 | Shakti | Daljeet Singh |
| 2020–2021 | Naagin 5 | Tapish Singhania |
| 2021 | Molkki | Arjun Bajwa |
| 2022 | Fanaa: Ishq Mein Marjawaan | Rajeev Kumar |
| 2022 | Swaran Ghar | Young Kanwaljeet Bedi |
| 2022–2024 | Parineetii | Amit Bajwa |
| 2024–2025 | Kumkum Bhagya | Arman Randhawa |
| 2025 | Sajan Ji Ghar Aaye Family Kyun Sharmaye | Rajan Sinha |
