= Jiten Lalwani =

Indian television actor

- Born: 3 August 1969 (age 57); Firozabad, Uttar Pradesh, India
- Education: Graduate
- Alma mater: DBS College Kanpur
- Occupation: Actor
- Years active: 1993–present
- Known for: Kyunki Saas Bhi Kabhi Bahu Thi
- Notable work: Sasural Genda Phool; Krishnadasi; Devon Ke Dev...Mahadev; Pehredaar Piya Ki; Rishta Likhenge Hum Naya; Shubharambh; RadhaKrishn; Shrimad Ramayan
- Spouse: Dipika Lalwani (m. 1996)
- Children: Pallak Lalwani; Aditya Lalwani

Jiten Lalwani is an Indian film and television actor. He is best known for playing Kiran Virani in Kyunki Saas Bhi Kabhi Bahu Thi, Inder Kashyap in Sasural Genda Phool, Indradev in Devon Ke Dev Mahadev, Bhuvan Singh in Pehredaar Piya Ki, Gunwant Reshammiya in Shubharambh and Raja Janaka in Shrimad Ramayan.

== Early life ==
Jiten Lalwani was born in Firozabad, Uttar Pradesh on 3 August 1969, to Mohan Das Khubchand Lalwani and Mohini Lalwani as their third child. His elder siblings are Ashok Lalwani and Sunita Lalwani. He was raised in Kanpur and did his schooling from Mariampur Senior Secondary School, Inter college from BNSD and completed his graduation from DBS College Kanpur.

Jiten came to Mumbai in 1993 to pursue a career in acting and the same year got a small part in a play directed by Makarand Deshpande called YATRI.

He is married to Dipika Lalwani with whom he has two children: daughter Pallak Lalwani who is also an actor and son Aditya Lalwani who is studying.

== Career ==
Jiten Lalwani made his television debut with Raman Kumar's TV series Labella's, which was telecast in 1994 on BI TV as Cafe-18. He has appeared in TV shows like Vishnu Puran, Parampara, Hasratein, Kartavya, Kyunki Saas Bhi Kabhi Bahu Thi, Sasural Genda Phool, Devon Ke Dev...Mahadev, Pehredaar Piya Ki, Rishta Likhenge Hum Naya, Shubh Aarambh and Shrimad Ramayan.

== Filmography ==
=== Films ===
Year	Movie	Role	Notes
2006	The Curse of King Tut's Tomb	Dr. Syadeh	Telefilm
2007	Pyar Kare Dis: Feel the Power of Love	Dev	Sindhi film
2017	Half Girlfriend	Basketball Coach	Hindi film
2024	Auron Mein Kahan Dum Tha	Superintendent Solanki	Hindi film
2026	Drishyam: The Conclusion	Mr. Kamat	Hindi film

=== Television ===
Year	Show	Role	Notes
1993	Zamana Badal Gaya	Rahul	
1994	Labella's		
1995	Shatranj		
1995	V3+		
1996	Parampara	Karan Malhotra	
1996	Tara		
1996	Karz		
1997	Jeene Bhi Do yaro		
1997	Hasratein	Satish Verma	
1998	Bhanwar		
1998	Deewar		
1998	Raahat		
1998	Jane bhi Do Paro		
1998	Mahabharat Katha	Prince Surath	
1999	Main Dilli Hoon	Yuvraj Janmejaya	
1999	Kartavya		
1999	Saturday Suspense	Vikram Chawla	
1999	Star Bestsellers		
2000–2006	Kyunki Saas Bhi Kabhi Bahu Thi	Kiran Virani	
2000	Rishton Ki Dori		
2000	Rishtey		
2001	Karam		
2001	Vishnu Puran	Virochana	
2001	Hum Saath Aath Hain		
2001	Shagun	Sooraj	
2001	Kasamm	Rakesh	
2002	Papa		
2003	Kise Apna Kahein	Daanish	
2003	Miilee		
2003–2009	Phir Bhi Dil Hai Hindustani	Jai	
2004	Raat Hone Ko Hai		
2004	Ssshhhh...Koi Hai	Captain Kishan	
2004	Jhoot Bole Kauwa Kaate	Anand	
2005	Baa Bahoo Aur Baby	Malay Tijoriwala	
2006	Betiyaan apni yaa paraya dhan	Pran Jeevan	
2006	Risshton Ki Dor	Kunal Shah	
2006	Resham Dankh	Satyajeet Arora	
2006	Kituu Sabb Jaantii Hai		
2006	Pyaar Ke Do Naam: Ek Raadha, Ek Shyaam		
2006	Apradhi Kaun	Ravi Rao	
2007	Jersey No. 10		
2007	Mann Main Hai Vishwas		
2008	Kal Hamara Hai		
2008	Lo Ho Gayi Pooja Iss Ghar Ki	Amrit Lal	
2007-2008	Meri Awaz Ko Mil Gayi Roshni	Prakash Chopra	
2008–2009	Shree	Anand Raghuvanshi	
2010	Mano Ya Na Mano	Arun	Episode 3
2010–2012	Sasural Genda Phool	Inder Kashyap	
2011	Parvarrish – Kuchh Khattee Kuchh Meethi	Monty Sood	
2012	Sajda		
2012–2014	Devon Ke Dev Mahadev	Indra Dev	
2013	Code Red		
2013	The Adventures of Hatim	Bilmoosh	
2013	Dil Dosti Dance	Rishi Shekhawat	
2014	Arjun		
2014	Laut Aao Trisha	Gaurav Swaika	
2015	Savdhaan India: Crime Alert		
2015	Diya Aur Baati Hum	Bharat Kapoor	
2016	Krishnadasi	Shashwat Vidhayadhar Rao	
2016	Dil Deke Dekho	Sheri Chopra (Preet's Father)	
2017	Pehredaar Piya Ki	Bhuvan Singh	
2017–2019	Yeh Un Dinon Ki Baat Hai	Sameer Maheshwari's Voiceover	
2017–2018	Rishta Likhenge Hum Naya	Bhuvan Singh	
2018	Kasam Tere Pyaar Ki	Advocate Vikaas Sharma	
2018	Papa By Chance	Harman Batra	
2018	Vikram Betaal Ki Rahasya Gatha	Shani Dev	
2019	Naagin 3	Samarjeet Sippi	
2019	Paramavatar Shri Krishna	Shani Dev	
2019–2020	Shubharambh	Gunwant Reshammiya	
2020	Kahat Hanuman Jai Shree Ram	Kesari	
2020	Mere Sai	Ganga Dhar	
2021	Paapnashini Ganga	Maharaj Himavat	
2021	Ziddi Dil Maane Na	Dr. Deepak Mahajan	
2021–2022	Sasural Genda Phool 2	Indrabhan Kashyap	
2022	RadhaKrishn	Maharishi Bhrigu	
2022	Ghum Hai Kisikey Pyaar Meiin	Dr. Machindra Throat	
2022	Swaraj	King Daya Ram	
2023	Wagle Ki Duniya		
2023–2024	Har Bahu Ki Yahi Kahani Sasumaa Ne Meri Kadar Na Jaani	Shri Shri Purshottam Shastri	
2024–2025	Shrimad Ramayan	King Janak	
2025	Pocket Mein Aasman	Manohar Doshi	
2025–present	Jagadhatri	Jagdish Naik	
2025	Kyunki Saas Bhi Kabhi Bahu Thi 2	Kiran Virani	
2026–present	Hastinapur Ke Veer	Dronacharya	

=== Web Series ===
Year	Show	Role	Notes
2021	The Whistleblower	Sadhu	
2021	Pari Hun Mai	Pari's Father	
2022	Shoorveer	Shekhar Sen	
2024	Ranneeti: Balakot & Beyond	Air Chief Marshal Anwar Khan	
2024	Illegal 3	Harish Mehra	

=== Plays ===
- 1993 - Yatri. Directed by Makarand Deshpande.
- 1995 - Bluffmaster. Directed by Anand Mishra.
- 1996 - Kiski Biwi Kiska Shauher. Directed by Anand Mishra.
- 1997 - Dil Ka Haal Sune Dilwala. Directed by Nikhilesh Sharma.
- 1998 - Baat Baat main Bigdey Haalaat. Directed by Sameer Patel.
- 2005 - Sabse Bada Rupaiya. Directed by Harin Thakkar.
- 2007 - Mere Naam Joker. Directed by Shubha Khote

== Awards ==
Year	Function	Award	Show	Result
2018	Lions Gold Awards	Favourite Actor in a Negative Role	Pehredaar Piya Ki	Won
