= Bhaage Re Mann =

- Genre: Soap opera
- Created by: Mitu
- Screenplay by: Swati Pande; Gitangshu Dey; Abhilasha Negi; Komal Garg; Ritu Bhatia ( Dialogues )
- Story by: Mitu
- Directed by: Mitu
- Creative director: Arshima Thapar
- Starring: Karuna Pandey; Nishad Vaidya; Ankit Narang; Chandan Anand; Priya Marathe; Manasi Salvi; Tarun Mehta; Nupur Alankar; Kanika Shivpuri; Arshima Thapar; Aamir Dalvi
- Opening theme: Khsushboo jaise fizaon mein...Bhaage Re Mann
- Country of origin: India
- Original language: Hindi
- No. of seasons: 2
- No. of episodes: 123

Production
- Producers: Brijesh Kumar; Rekha Kumar; Mitu
- Production location: India
- Running time: 20–45 minutes
- Production company: Positive Thinkerz

Original release
- Network: Zindagi
- Release: 30 November 2015 – 25 July 2016

Bhaage Re Mann is an Indian soap opera which aired on Zindagi from 30 November 2015 to 25 July 2016. It was the first original soap of Zindagi. The story revolves around Padmini Awasthi (Karuna Pandey).

== Plot ==
It's the story of a woman Padmini Awasthi (Karuna Pandey), who had kept herself from getting tied down to societal norms and stereotypes for 39 years. She has to now rise to the occasion and don a role she has kept away from.

== Summary ==
Bhaage Re Mann is the coming of age of a 40-year-old woman, Padmini. Padmini, at the age of 19, ran away from her family, marriage and responsibility, being a commitment-phobic woman.

Now, 20 years later, her best friend (also her Bhabhi) calls her for the wedding of her youngest daughter, Anvita. With trepidation, she steps back to her childhood home and town. Only to be faced with the wrath of her elder brother, who still holds a grudge at the way she left. She is supported by her once best friend and now the support of her family, Raghav Vajpayee or RU uncle as her millennial nieces and nephew call him.

In this marriage setup, Padmini meets her two nieces, Jyoti and Anvita(the bride-to-be) and her nephew Ishaan. She sees them for the first time as grown-up people. They are amazed to see her, their aunty, Mini B (as she insists on being called). She is everything they have been told not to be. She is quirky, cool and extremely vocal. With her lateral thinking and one-liners for them, she is a riot. Padmini fits into the house like a glove. But then, as she is preparing to leave, a tragedy strikes. She is the only adult around these three kids left anchorless.

She must take on a maternal role for the children despite lacking conventional parenting experience, relying instead on her unconventional approach. As she adjusts to caring for the family, the children discover a history between her and Raghav, and the remainder of the story follows their efforts to reconcile the two.

== Broadcast ==
The first season of Bhaage Re Mann was broadcast on Zindagi from 30 November 2015 to 19 March 2016. Season 2 was broadcast on the same channel from 23 June 2016 to 25 July 2016.

== Seasons ==
Season	No. of Episodes	Original Run
1	96	30 November 2015 – 19 March 2016, Mon – Sat 8:30pm
2	27	June 23, 2016 – July 25, 2016, Mon – Sat 10:40pm

== Cast and characters ==
- Karuna Pandey as Padmini Awasthi: Ashok Awasthi's younger sister
- Chandan Anand as Raghav Vajpayee: Ashok Awasthi's neighbour
- Kanika Shivpuri as Mrs. Vajpayee: Raghav's mother; Popo's grandmother; Riya's mother-in-law
- Ved Thapar as Ashok Awasthi
- Nupur Alankar as Anjali Ashok Awasthi
- Tarun Mehta as Ishaan Awasthi: Ashok and Anjali's son
- Priya Marathe as Sneha Ishaan Awasthi: Ishaan's wife
- Vasundhara Kaul as Jyoti Awasthi: Ashok and Anjali's daughter
- Ankit Narang as Ashutosh: Jyoti's husband
- Arshima Thapar as Anvita Awasthi: Ashok and Anjali's daughter
- Nishad Vaidya as Rohit: Anvita's husband
- Aamir Dalvi as Rudra: Padmini's tracking friend
- Manasi Salvi as Riya Raghav Vajpayee: Raghav's wife; Jojo's mother
- Gautam Saugat as Maali Kaka
- Sarang Patwardhan as Popo Vajpayee: Raghav and Riya's son, Padmini's best friend
