= Akansha Sareen =

Indian model and actress

- Born: 8 August 1992 (age 34); Punjab, India
- Occupations: Model; Actress
- Height: 167.64 cm (5 ft 6 in)

Akansha Sareen is an Indian model and actress.

== Early life and education ==
Akansha Sareen was born on 8 August 1992 in Punjab to Sanjeev and Anju Sareen and raised in Delhi. She did her schooling in Cambridge School, Delhi and Ryan International School, Surat. She subsequently studied Journalism and Mass Communication at Amity University.

== Career ==
After receiving her bachelor's degree in Journalism and Mass Communication from Amity University, Sareen worked as a Content Executive for Tangerine Digital. Akansha made her TV debut in MTV's reality show Nano Drive with MTV. She has appeared in several episodes of popular shows such as Aahat, Hum Ne Li Hai...Shapath, CID, Savdhaan India and Crime Patrol. She received wider recognition following her parallel lead role as Dr Riya Kapoor in Savitri Devi College & Hospital on Colors TV. Following this, she appeared in a cameo role in Yeh Teri Galliyan and earned positive reviews from critics. Later Sareen gained immense popularity with her negative lead roles in Dil Toh Happy Hai Ji, Shaadi Mubarak and Zindagi Mere Ghar Aana.

== Filmography ==
=== Television ===
Year(s)	Title	Role	Notes	Ref(s)
2014	Nano Drive with MTV		Debut	
2014	Laut Aao Trisha			
2014	Airlines			
2014–2015	Aahat		Episodic lead	
2014–2018	CID			
2015	Hunnarbaaz		Future TV	
2015	Code Red			
2015	Sankat Mochan Mahabali Hanumaan			
2015–2016	Hum Ne Li Hai...Shapath			
2015–2017	Savdhaan India		Episodic lead roles	
2015–2018	Crime Patrol			
2016	Gumrah: End of Innocence		Episodic lead	
2016	Man Mein Hai Visshwas		Episodic lead	
2016	Y.A.R.O Ka Tashan	Mira		
2016	Hoshiyar… Sahi Waqt, Sahi Kadam		Episodic lead	
2017–2018	Savitri Devi College & Hospital	Dr. Riya Kapoor	Parallel lead	
2018	Laal Ishq	Kajal	Episodic lead	
2018	Yeh Teri Galiyan	Arpita Chaubey	Supporting role	
2019	Dil Toh Happy Hai Ji	Sania Shyamnik Bhatia	Negative lead	
2019	India Alert	Anjali	Episodic lead	
2020–2021	Shaadi Mubarak	Rati Pandey	Negative lead	
2021	Qurbaan Hua	Raseeli	Negative lead	
2021	Zindagi Mere Ghar Aana	Vishaka Choudhary	Negative lead	

=== Web series ===
Year(s)	Title	Role	Notes	Platform	Ref(s)
2018	Mirzapur	Dancer		Amazon Prime	
2018	Inside Edge			Amazon Prime	
2021	The Empire	Razia	Supporting role	Hotstar	

== See also ==
- List of Hindi television actresses
- List of Indian television actresses
