= Sailessh Gulabani =

Indian television actor

- Born: Sailessh Gulabani; 13 April 1981 (age 45); Mumbai, Maharashtra, India
- Education: Smt. M.M.K College of Commerce & Economics
- Occupation: Actor
- Years active: 2001–present
- Height: 1.73 m (5 ft 8 in)
- Spouse: Ashita Dhawan (m. 2010)

Sailessh Gulabani is an Indian television actor. He is known for portraying the role of Vibhishan in Siya Ke Ram and Deepak in Aap Ke Aa Jane Se that aired on Zee TV.

== Career ==
Gulabani began his career in 2001 when he appeared in the music video "Dekha Hai Teri Aankhon Ko" by the Aryans. Following Pankaj Udhas's "Khuda Bachaye" music video. In 2008, he was cast in the TV serial Jeevan Saathi as Ishaan Solanki and in Kkavyanjali as Nihaal Nanda. A year later, he bagged the role of Abhay on Sony TV's Ladies Special. In 2012, he was cast in Sajda Tere Pyaar Mein as Sameer. In 2013, he starred in an episode of CID. In 2013 and 2015, he guest-starred in the episodic roles of Namit and Gautam in Savdhaan India. In 2014, he was cast in the serial Aur Pyaar Ho Gaya as Pratap. In 2016, he joined the mythological show Siya Ke Ram as Vibhishan. In late 2017, he joined Zee TV's new show Aap Ke Aa Jane Se as the recurring character of Deepak. He portrayed the role of Devraj Indra in the mythological TV serial Shaktipeeth Ke Bhairav. He also made appearance in SAB TV's show Baalveer Returns as Parikshak, a negative character.

== Personal life ==
He married his longtime girlfriend, actress Ashita Dhawan, on 20 January 2010. They have 2 kids together, twins named Arhmaan and Amaira.

== Television ==
Year(s)	Show	Role	Notes
2005	Kkavyanjali	Nihal Nanda	
2008	Chhoona Hai Aasmaan	Rocky	
2008–2009	Jeevan Saathi	Ishaan Solanki	
2009	Naaginn	Agni	
2009	Ladies Special	Abhay	
2011–2012	Sawaare Sabke Sapne... Preeto	Pankaj Ambrela	
2012	Sajda Tere Pyaar Mein	Sameer	
2013	Savdhaan India	Namit	Episodic role
2013	C.I.D.		Episodic Role
2013	Arjun	Harish Oberoi	Episodic Role
2014	Aur Pyaar Ho Gaya	Pratap	
2015	Dil Ki Baatein Dil Hi Jaane	Manav	
2015	Savdhaan India	Gautam	Episodic role
2016	Siya Ke Ram	Vibhishana	
2016	Tamanna	Sameer	
2017–2018	Shaktipeeth Ke Bhairav	Devraj Indra	
2018–2019	Aap Ke Aa Jane Se	Deepak	
2019	Shrimad Bhagwat Mahapuran	Maharaj Satyavrata	Episodic Role
2019–2020	Jag Janani Maa Vaishno Devi - Kahani Mata Rani Ki	Devraj Indra	
2020	Baalveer Returns	Parikshak	Cameo
2020	Tenali Rama	Vengudu Swami	Episodic role
2020–2021	Aye Mere Humsafar		
2020–2021	Durga – Mata Ki Chhaya	Samarth Aneja	
2021	Imlie	Pranav	Cameo
2021	Tera Yaar Hoon Main	Rahul	Cameo
2021–2022	Iss Mod Se Jaate Hain	Pramod Pathak	
2023	Baalveer 3	Babel	
2023–2024	Teri Meri Doriyaann	Hansraj Singh Sandhu	
2025	Manpasand Ki Shaadi	Kundan Dewan	
