= Bhumika Gurung =

Indian actress

Bhumika Gurung Malhotra
- Gurung at the Colors TV Video Summit in 2019
- Born: Bhumika Gurung
- Occupations: Actress; Model
- Years active: 2014–present
- Known for: Nimki Mukhiya; Nimki Vidhayak

Bhumika Gurung Malhotra, professionally known as Bhumika Gurung, is an Indian actress who primarily works in Hindi television. She is best known for portraying Namkeen "Nimki" Kumari in Nimki Mukhiya and its sequel Nimki Vidhayak.

== Personal life ==
In March 2022, Gurung married Shekhar Malhotra.

== Career ==
Gurung made her television debut with Gumrah: End of Innocence in 2014. She later appeared in shows such as Yeh Hai Aashiqui and Mastaangi - One Love Story Two Lifetimes.

In 2017, she appeared in the film Wedding Anniversary. The same year, she gained wider recognition after being cast in the titular role of Namkeen "Nimki" Kumari in Nimki Mukhiya. She reprised the role in its sequel, Nimki Vidhayak, which further established her in Hindi television.Gurung rose to prominence in 2017 with Nimki Mukhiya. In 2019, she reprised the titular role in its sequel Nimki Vidhayak, which followed Nimki’s journey into politics.

In 2021, she portrayed Meera in Mann Kee Awaaz Pratigya 2. In 2022, she played the lead role of Rani in Hara Sindoor and made her web series debut with Chingari.

In 2024, she appeared in the audio series Secret Ameerzada as Shanaya Gill. Later, Gurung returned to television with Bas Itna Sa Khwaab, where she portrayed Shagun Trivedi. In 2025, she appeared in the film The Secret of Devkaali.

As of 2026, she is seen portraying Saara Sethi in Itti Si Khushi.

== Filmography ==
=== Films ===
Year	Title	Role	Notes	Ref.
2017	Wedding Anniversary	Aarti		
2025	The Secret of Devkaali			

=== Television ===
Year	Title	Role	Notes	Ref.
2014	Gumrah: End of Innocence			
2014	Yeh Hai Aashiqui	Kelly		
2016	Mastaangi - One Love Story Two Lifetimes	Vanessa		
2017–2019	Nimki Mukhiya	Namkeen "Nimki" Kumari		
2019–2020	Nimki Vidhayak	Namkeen "Nimki" Kumari		
2020	Savdhaan India			
2021	Humkadam	Tara		
2021	Mann Kee Awaaz Pratigya 2	Meera		
2022	Hara Sindoor	Rani		
2024–2025	Bas Itna Sa Khwaab	Shagun Trivedi		
2026	Itti Si Khushi	Saara Sethi		

=== Web series ===
- Chingari (2022) as Chingari Chaubey

=== Audio series ===
- Secret Ameerzada (2024) as Shanaya Gill
