= The Secret of Devkaali =

Indian thriller film

- Theatrical release poster
- Directed by: Niraj Chauhan
- Written by: Neha Mahendra Soni
- Produced by: Niraj Chauhan; Prince Chauhan
- Starring: Niraj Chauhan; Sanjay Mishra; Mahesh Manjrekar; Prashant Narayanan; Ramkrishan Dhakad; Bhumika Gurrang; Zarina Wahab; Shiv Prateek
- Cinematography: Mukesh Tiwari
- Edited by: Shailendra Kumar
- Music by: Ali Aslam Shah
- Production company: Chauhan Production
- Release date: 18 April 2025
- Running time: 133 minutes
- Country: India
- Language: Hindi

The Secret of Devkaali is a 2025 Indian Hindi-language mythological thriller starring Sanjay Mishra, Mahesh Manjrekar and Niraj Chauhan.

== Plot ==
Set in the village of Devkaali, the story follows Madhav Tyagi, who becomes an instrument of divine intervention to uncover a long-hidden secret. The village is home to two primary clans—Kring and Pariyaar. Over time, Hemant Acharya, the son of the village head, manipulates the Pariyaar community for his personal gain, causing a divide that leads to conflict. As tensions rise and injustices grow, the legend of the Goddess intervening to restore balance takes form through Madhav. The film unfolds his journey to challenge oppression and uncover the truth behind the village's deep-rooted curse.

== Cast ==
- Niraj Chauhan
- Bhumika Gurung
- Mahesh Manjrekar
- Ramkrishan Dhakad
- Sanjay Mishra
- Zarina Wahab
- Prashant Narayanan
- Anoushka Chauhan
- Amit Lekhwani
- Abhi Chothani
- Manan Bhardwaj
- Mohammed Umar
- Shiv Pratteek
- Manoj karotia

Kusumika Das of Times Now rated the film three out of five stars and wrote, "Despite a few pacing issues and moments of melodrama, the film succeeds in delivering a meaningful message wrapped in folklore." Giving the same rating, Ganesh Aaglave of Firstpost wrote, "The Secret of Devkaali scores high due to its brilliantly executed climax and star performances". The film had a limited theatrical release and performed poorly at the box office, collecting approximately ₹0.25 crore in India.
