= Shubhaavi Choksey =

Indian television actress

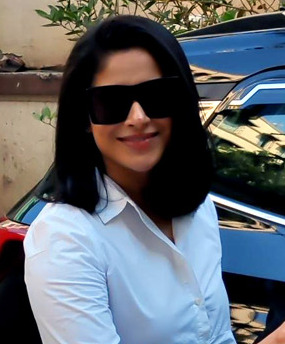
- Choksey in 2023
- Born: Shubhavi Kadandale
- Occupation: Actress
- Years active: 2004–present
- Spouse: Harshal Choksey (m. 2007)
- Children: 1

Shubhaavi Choksey is an Indian actress who primarily works in Hindi television. Choksey is best known for her portrayal of Meera Singhania in the blockbuster soap opera Kyunki Saas Bhi Kabhi Bahu Thi (2004-2006), Mohini Basu in the reboot Kasautii Zindagii Kay (2018-2020), Nandini Garewal Kapoor in Bade Achhe Lagte Hain 2 and Lavanya Mittal in Dil Ko Tumse Pyaar Hua.

== Personal life ==
Shubhaavi married Harshal Choksey on 25 November 2007. Shubhaavi and Harshal have a son together. She is also a trained Bharatnatyam dancer.

== Filmography ==
=== Films ===
Year	Title	Role	Notes	Ref.
2004	From Tiya with Love	Nivedita	Short film	
2018	Dhadak	Promila Bhowmick		

=== Television ===
Year	Title	Role	Notes	Ref.
2004–2006	Kyunki Saas Bhi Kabhi Bahu Thi	Meera Singhania		
2005-2006	Jassi Jaissi Koi Nahin	Meera Oberoi		
2005–2007	Kituu Sabb Jaantii Hai	Sanwari		
2006	Ishq Ki Ghanti			
2007–2008	Kahaani Ghar Ghar Ki	Rishika Rai Chaudhary		
2007	Teen Bahuraniyaan	Kunjbala	Episode 217	
2009	CID	Divya Sharda	Episode 466	
2009	CID	Nalini Trimbak	Episode 555	
2013–2014	Bade Achhe Lagte Hain	Juhi		
2018–2020	Kasautii Zindagii Kay	Mohini Basu		
2021–2023	Bade Achhe Lagte Hain 2	Nandini Garewal Kapoor		
2023	Bekaboo	Rani Pari		
2024–2025	Dil Ko Tumse Pyaar Hua	Lavanya "Lavs" Maheshwari Mittal		

=== Web series ===
Year	Title	Role	Notes	Ref.
2019	Medically Yourrs	Mrs. Basu	ALTBalaji's series	
