= Jeevan Saathi – Humsafar Zindagi Ke =

Indian television series

- Also known as: Jeevan Saathi — Humsafar Zindagi Ke
- Genre: Drama
- Written by: Rajesh M. Joshi; Jayesh Patil; Shashi Mittal; Sumeet Mittal; Zama Habib; Nikhilesh Sharma
- Directed by: Bhagwan Yadav; Dharmesh Shah
- Starring: See below
- Opening theme: "Jeevan Saathi" by
- Country of origin: India
- Original language: Hindi
- No. of seasons: 01
- No. of episodes: 310

Production
- Producers: Paresh Rawal; Hemal Thakkar
- Camera setup: Multi-camera
- Running time: Approx. 24 minutes
- Production company: Playtime Creationn

Original release
- Network: Colors TV
- Release: 21 July 2008 – 4 September 2009

Jeevan Saathi (transl. Life Partner) also known as Jeevan Saathi — Humsafar Zindagi Ke, is an Indian television series. that aired on Colors TV from 21 July 2008 to 4 September 2009. It is based on the love story of Neil and Viraj. Series produced by Bollywood film comedy-actor Paresh Rawal.

== Plot ==
Jeevan Saathi follows the story of Viraj Rathod's life and how she beats the obstacles thrown out by her father, the egoistic Vikramaditya Rathod. Viraj Rathod purely loved a foreigner named Neil Fernandes, until her father Vikramaditya Rathod and his brother Vanraj, planned to get Viraj married as quickly as they could. Finally, at the last minute, Viraj revealed the truth. Vikramaditya Rathod then decided to get her married to a mute person, named Ishwar. At first, Viraj starts to hate Ishwar, but slowly they start to like each other. Upon this, Viraj decides to take revenge from her father due to his insults and behavior. Viraj decides to stop Vikramaditya's vote in the congress. When she makes her father Vikram Rathod lose the elections, her father cannot tolerate it and then tells everyone in the public that her daughter is mental. He even sends her to the Mental Hospital. Ishwar her husband keeps on coming to the mental hospital to save her. At the end Viraj is mental. Ishwar somehow takes her out of the mental hospital and takes her to her mother. Her mother tells Ishwar that her husband and brother-in-law are planning to kill them both.

Viraj's mum gives Ishwar money to look after her daughter. When Ishwar and mental Viraj sit in the taxi the man tricks them and takes their money. Ishwar goes to another village and starts working in a takeaway. She lives with an old woman and her son. There a cunning man tries to rape Viraj, but then Ishwar saves her. Viraj's mum is keeping on going out of home. When one day Kamakshi's husband sees her and follows her. He missed her once but then does not the second time. He sees her visiting Neil, who proves dead. Then he does not do anything. Ishwar is trying to help Viraj regain her memory from help of Baba Sahib. Then later on, Viraj's memory comes back but she only remembers her best part of her life which ends when Neil and she were getting married. She does not even remember Ishwar who helped through her life. Later on she assembles through her life and then accepts Ishwar as her husband. Ishwar has got a very high paid job making sculptures and is earning much money. Ishwar is being targeted by someone who wants to kill him. Will he be safe and secure? What will happen to Viraj and Neil?

== Cast ==
- Vaani Sharma as Viraj Rathore
- Gaurav Khanna as Neil Fernandes
- Nihar Thakkar as Saumya Rathore
- Shailesh Gulabani as Ishaan Solanki
- Vikram Gokhale as Vikramaditya Rathore
- Aamir Dalvi as Ishwar
- Suzanne Bernert as Lydia
- Jimit Trivedi

== Production ==
In November 2008, the shootings and telecast of all the Hindi television series including this series and films were stalled on 8 November 2008 due to dispute by the technician workers of FWICE (Federation of Western India Cine Employees) for increasing the wages, better work conditions and more breaks between shootings. FWICE first took a strike on 1 October 2008 when they addressed their problems with the producers and production was stalled. A contract was signed after four days discussions and shooting was happening only for two hours content in a day, after which differences increased between them while channels gave them time until 30 October 2008 to sort it out. Failing to do so lead to protests again from 10 November 2008 to 19 November 2008 during which channels blacked out new broadcasts and repeat telecasts were shown from 10 November 2008. On 19 November 2008, the strike was called off after settling the disputes and the production resumed. The new episodes started to telecast from 1 December 2008.
