= Sulabha Arya =

Indian actress

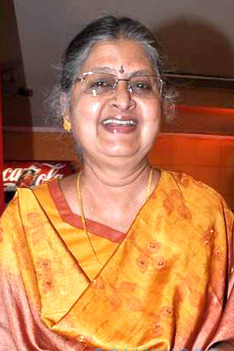
- Arya in 2013
- Born: 15 July 1950 (age 76)
- Other name: Sulbha Arya
- Occupation: Actress
- Known for: Character acting
- Spouse: Ishan Arya (died 1996)
- Children: 2
- Relatives: Srishti Behl (daughter-in-law)
- Family: Akhtar-Azmi family Behl family

Sulabha Arya (born 15 July 1950) is an Indian actress in Hindi and Marathi film, television and stage industry. She is the widow of veteran Indian cinematographer Ishan Arya and mother of cinematographer Sameer Arya and actor Sagar Arya. She is best known for her role as Mandira (wife of Bhattacharya) in Doordarshan's '80s sitcom "Yeh Jo Hai Zindagi" and later Shanti Maasi in Sasural Genda Phool. She played Kantaben in the 2003 romantic Bollywood drama, Kal Ho Na Ho, and Lakshmamma in Shyam Benegal's Amaravati ki Kathayein.

== Career ==
Arya made her television debut with the Indian television industry's first sitcom, Yeh Jo Hai Zindagi, which aired on DD National in 1984. Some of the notable films in which she worked include Koyla (1997) and Koi... Mil Gaya (2003). She played the role of Kanta Ben in the 2003 dramedy film Kal Ho Naa Ho. She played the role of the mother-in-law in television series, Yes Boss on SAB TV. She was last seen at SET SAB's Maddam Sir as Saira Begum.

In 2021, Arya was roped in for a television drama series Zindagi Mere Ghar Aana, which premiered on StarPlus on 26 July 2021, and featured Arya in the role of a grandmother.

== Personal life ==
She is a Maharashtrian who married Ishan Arya (Irshad Ahsan). Her son Sameer Arya (married to Srishti Behl, the daughter of Ramesh Behl) is also a cinematographer, known for films like Koyla (1997), Koi... Mil Gaya (2003) and Shootout at Wadala (2013).

== Filmography ==
=== Film ===
Year	Title	Role	Notes	Ref.
1996	Masoom			
2008	Halla Bol	Nazma Khan		
2003	Kal Ho Naa Ho	Kantaben		
2019	What Are the Odds			
2022	Cirkus	Chachi		
2026	Golmaal 5			

=== Television ===
Year	Title	Role	Notes	Ref.
1984	Yeh Jo Hai Zindagi	Mandira Bhattacharya		
1988	Palash Ke Phool			
1988	Malgudi Days			
1989	Tumhare Liye			
1992	Kirdaar			
1993	Mitti Ke Rang		Episode: Mavali	
1996	Filmi Chakkar			
1998	Hum Sab Ek Hain	Buaji	1 Episode	
1998–2001	Hip Hip Hurray	Mrs Sharma		
1999–2000	Muskaan	Malti Bua		
1999–2009	Yes Boss	Meera's mother		
2005	Dil Kya Chahta Hai			
2006	Woh Rehne Waali Mehlon Ki	Aarti's mother		
2009–2010	Shraddha	Madhu Khurana		
2010–2012	Sasural Genda Phool	Shanti Bajpai		
2015–2016	Begusarai	Badi Amma		
2016–2017	Khatmal E Ishq	Loveena's grandmother		
2019–2020	Ishaaron Ishaaron Mein	Geeta Shrivastava		
2021–2022	Zindagi Mere Ghar Aana	Santo Sakhuja		
2022	Maddam Sir	Saira Begum		
2025	Noyontara	Didabhai		
2025–present	Veen Doghantali Hi Tutena	Nalini Rajwade		

== Awards ==
- Screen Award for Best Comedian – Won
  1997 Masoom
