= Vrushika Mehta =

Indian television actress

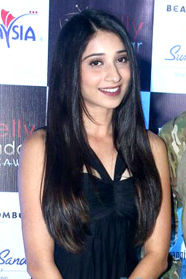
- Mehta in 2016
- Born: 18 February 1994 (age 32); Ahmedabad, Gujarat, India
- Occupations: Actress; dancer
- Years active: 2012–2020
- Known for: Dil Dosti Dance; Yeh Teri Galiyan; Yeh Rishta Kya Kehlata Hai
- Spouse: Saurabh Ghedia (m. 2023)

Vrushika Mehta is a former Indian actress and professional dancer who primarily works in Hindi television. She commenced her acting career with Aasman Se Aage as a contestant. Mehta is most renowned for her depiction of Sharon Rai Prakash in Dil Dosti Dance, Asmita "Puchki" Mazumdar in Yeh Teri Galiyan, and Dr. Riddhima Saxena in Yeh Rishta Kya Kehlata Hai.

== Early life ==
Mehta was born in Ahmedabad and brought up in Mumbai. She completed her graduation from Tolani College of Commerce, Mumbai. Mehta is a professional dancer.

== Personal life ==
On 11 December 2022, she got engaged to Toronto based software engineer boyfriend, Saurabh Ghedia. The couple got married on 10 December 2023 and moved to Toronto.

== Career ==
Mehta made her acting debut in 2012 with Aasman Se Aage. She depicted Sharon Rai Prakash from 2013 to 2015 in Dil Dosti Dance opposite Shantanu Maheshwari. It proved to be a significant turning point in her career, with their pairing being one of the most successful in the Hindi Youth Television genre.

Next, she appeared in Yeh Hai Aashiqui. In 2015, she was part of episodes like Zing's Pyaar Tune Kya Kiya and Zee TV's Fear Files.

In 2015, she portrayed Amrita Prasad in Twist Wala Love opposite Rohan Gandotra. Subsequently, she played Kaira in Satrangi Sasural opposite Ravish Desai. In 2016, she hosted Desi Explorers Jordan on YouTube.

In 2016, she portrayed Ishana in Ishqbaaaz opposite Kunal Jaisingh.

Following this, she made her digital debut as Tamanna in Viu's Truth or Tamanna. From 2018 to 2020, she depicted Asmita "Puchki" Kumari in Zee TV's Yeh Teri Galiyan opposite Avinash Mishra and achieved further success.

From 30 November 2020 to 22 December 2020, she played Dr. Riddhima Saxena in StarPlus's Yeh Rishta Kya Kehlata Hai opposite Mohsin Khan.

== Filmography ==
=== Television ===
| Year | Title | Role | Notes | Ref. |
|---|---|---|---|---|
| 2012 | Aasman Se Aage | Vrushika | | |
| 2013–2015 | Dil Dosti Dance | Sharon Rai Prakash | | |
| 2014–2015 | Box Cricket League 1 | Contestant | | |
| 2015–2016 | Satrangi Sasural | Kaira Vihaan Vatsal | | |
| 2016 | Box Cricket League 2 | Contestant | | |
| 2016 | Ishqbaaaz | Ishana | | |
| 2018–2020 | Yeh Teri Galiyan | Asmita "Puchki" Mazumdar/ Devika Ghosh | | |
| 2020 | Yeh Rishta Kya Kehlata Hai | Dr. Riddhima Saxena | | |

==== Special appearances ====
| Year | Title | Role | Notes | Ref. |
|---|---|---|---|---|
| 2015 | Yeh Hai Aashiqui | Rukhsar Malik | | |
| 2015 | Yeh Hai Aashiqui | Twinkle | Episode 14 | |
| 2015 | Fear Files | Navanita | Season 2 | |
| 2015 | Twist Wala Love | Amrita Prasad | | |
| 2015 | Pyaar Tune Kya Kiya | Shanaya | | |
| 2022 | Kumkum Bhagya | Herself | | |

=== Web series ===
| Year | Title | Role | Notes | Ref. |
|---|---|---|---|---|
| 2016 | Desi Explorers Jordan | Host | | |
| 2016 | Desi Explorers Taiwan | Host | | |
| 2021 | Truth Or Tamanna? | Tamanna Walia | Mini-series | |

=== Music videos ===
| Year | Title | Singer | Ref. |
|---|---|---|---|
| 2018 | Aaja Mahi Ve | Aditi Singh Sharma | |
| 2020 | Nazar Mila | Sajal Saket | |

== Awards and nominations ==
| Year | Award | Category | Work | Result | Ref. |
|---|---|---|---|---|---|
| 2014 | Indian Television Academy Award | GR8! On Screen Couple (With Shantanu Maheshwari) | Dil Dosti Dance | Won | |
| 2016 | Asian Viewers Television Awards | Female Actor Of The Year | Dil Dosti Dance | Nominated | |
