= Sanjivani (2002 TV series) =

Indian medical drama (2002-2005)

- Also known as: Sanjivani: A Medical Boon
- Genre: Soap opera Medical drama
- Written by: Vipul Mehta
- Directed by: Santosh Bhatt
- Starring: See below
- Opening theme: "Sanjivani"
- Country of origin: India
- Original language: Hindi
- No. of seasons: 1
- No. of episodes: 167

Production
- Producer: Siddharth P. Malhotra
- Running time: 20-22 minutes
- Production company: Cinevistaas Limited

Original release
- Network: StarPlus
- Release: 16 January 2002 – 16 March 2005

Related
- Dill Mill Gayye; Sanjivani (2019 TV series)

Sanjivani: A Medical Boon is an Indian medical drama that was broadcast on StarPlus. It is also the first Indian series to talk on HIV. The show stars Mohnish Bahl, Gurdeep Kohli, Mihir Mishra, Sanjeet Bedi, Iravati Harshe.

A sequel series Dill Mill Gaye was premiered on 2007 on Star One and a reboot version also named Sanjivani premiered on Star Plus on 12 August 2019.

== Plot ==
Sanjivani tells the story about four medical interns, Dr. Juhi Singh, Dr. Rahul Mehra, Dr. Simran Chopra and Dr. Omi Joshi, and the trials and tribulations they face to fight a constant battle against diseases and death of patients while balancing their professional and personal life.

== Cast ==
=== Main ===
- Gurdeep Kohli as Dr.Juhi Mehra: Rahul's wife, CMO of Sanjivani, Surgeon
- Gaurav Chanana / Mihir Mishra as Dr.Rahul Mehra: Juhi's husband, Simran's ex-husband, Pediatrician.
- Mohnish Behl as Dr.Shashank Gupta: Surgeon, Smriti's husband, Truste of Sanjivani.
- Iravati Harshe as Dr.Smriti Malhotra Gupta:Gynaecologist, Shashank's wife
- Sanjeet Bedi as Dr Umesh 'Omi' Joshi: HIV Patient.
- Shilpa Kadam / Rupali Ganguly as Dr Simran Chopra:Kamal Chopra's daughter, Rahul's former wife.

=== Recurring ===
- Dr. Sagarika Dhawan as baby Anjali : Dr. Shashank and Dr. Smriti's little daughter.
- Ketki Dave as Dr.Madhvi Dholakiya: Paediatrician
- Shilpa tulaskar as Chitra: Nurse
- Arjun Punj as Dr.Aman / Rajeev Mathur: Juhi's childhood friend
- Madhumalti Kapoor as Biji: Juhi's grandmother
- Shagufta Ali as Tai Ji: Juhi's paying guest owner
- Tarana Raja as Reena: Aman's wife
- Vikram Gokhale as Kamal Chopra: Trustee of Sanjivani, Simran's father
- Sudhanshu Pandey as Vishal Kapoor
- Ashish Chaudhary as Karan
- Smita Bansal as Neha
- Siddharth Merchant as Chintu
- Rita Bhaduri as Dadi: Rahul's paternal grandmother
- Smita Jaykar / Nandita Puri as Suhasini Mehra: Rahul's mother
- Rajeev Verma as Dr. Yashraj Mehra: Rahul's father, Cardiologist
- Sumeet Raghavan / Vishal Puri as Rajat Mehra: Rahul's brother
- Indrani Haldar as Mrs. Mehta: Accident victim
- Shabbir Ahluwalia as Rohit Rai: Accident victim
- Ankita Bhargava as Anita: Patient's sister-in-law
- Jyotsna Karyekar as Sharda aka Daai Maa: Dr. Shashank's caretaker when he was young
- Sadiya Siddique as Richa Asthana
- Markand Soni as Arman as Dr. Shashank Gupta's grandson
- Rituraj Singh as

== Production ==
Sanjeet Bedi playing Dr. Omi quit the series unhappy with the ongoing story but soon returned in February 2005 for his death sequence when Omi is shown suffering from HIV and dies.

== Sequel ==
From 2007 to 2010, a sequel series Dill Mill Gayye aired on Star One starring Shilpa Anand, Sukirti Kandpal, Jennifer Winget, Karan Singh Grover and Mohnish Bahl

=== Reboot version ===
In 2019, a reboot version Sanjivani (2019 TV series) aired on StarPlus starring Namit Khanna, Surbhi Chandna, Gurdeep Kohli and Mohnish Bahl.

== Adaptations ==
Language	Title	First aired	Network(s)	Last aired	Notes
Bengali	Ekhane Aakash Neel এখানে আকাশ নীল	8 September 2008	Star Jalsha	29 May 2010	Remake

== Reception ==
=== Critics ===
The Indian Express stated, "Sanjivani's success came from its refreshing storytelling process, script and the performances of the actors. It also had the perfect mix of drama and romance, dollops of emotions and a strange relatability factor that none of the dailies provided during that time."

=== Ratings ===
Months after launch, in April 2002, it averaged a low rating of 3.75 TVR while in mid-October it rose to 4.08 TVR and in late October to 5.59 TVR. Since December, it steadily rose until June 2003 where in December, January, April, May and June 2003 it garnered 5.92, 6.35, 7.3 (both April and May) and 7.8 TVR. In early July it decreased to 6.9 TVR. In first week of September 2003, it garnered 6.8 TVR while the following week it rose to 7.6 TVR. In first week of August it rose to 8.5 TVR. In week 39, it was at fifteenth position with 7.9 TVR while in week 40 of 2003 (week ending 4 October 2003), it garnered its peak rating of 10.1 TVR entering into top 10 programs for the first time occupying sixth position with the character Dr. Aham's death track. On 19 November 2003, it garnered 8.5 TVR.
