= Kunwar Amar =

Indian dancer and actor

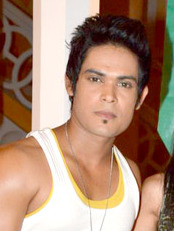
- Born: Kunwar Amarjeet Singh; 16 March 1986 (age 39); Indore, Madhya Pradesh, India
- Occupations: Dancer, actor, choreographer
- Years active: 2009–present
- Career
- Dances: Contemporary, freestyle, hip hop

Kunwar Amarjeet Singh (born 16 March 1986) is an Indian actor and dancer who mainly works in Hindi television. Singh is best known for his portrayal of Reyansh Singhania in Dil Dosti Dance, Kabir in Naamkarann and Tapish in Anupamaa.

== Career ==
Amar began his career as a contestant on Indian dance-based reality TV show "Dance India Dance", in which he became one of the finalists. He then went on to portray the lead role on India's dance-based teen drama Dil Dosti Dance as Reyansh Singhania.

He appeared as a contestant in Dare 2 Dance, a dance-and stunt-based reality show broadcast in September 2014 on Life OK. He also participated in the reality dance show Nach Baliye 5 with Charlie Chauhan. He has done episodes for Zing (TV channel)'s Pyaar Tune Kya Kiya (TV series) and Bindass's Yeh Hai Aashiqui. He also acted in popular TV show Naamkaran as Aladdin in 2016.

Since November 2023 he is portraying the role of a dancer Tapesh opposite Nishi Saxena in StarPlus's Anupamaa.

== Filmography ==
=== Films ===
Year	Title	Role	Notes	Ref.
2021	Niyati Chakra	Unnamed	Short film	

=== Television ===
Year	Title	Role	Notes	Ref.
2010	Dance India Dance	Contestant	4th runner-up	
2011–2015	Dil Dosti Dance	Reyansh "Rey" Singhania		
2012–2013	Nach Baliye 5	Contestant	5th runner-up	
2014	Dare 2 Dance	Contestant		
2014-2015	Pyaar Tune Kya Kiya	Vikram Kapoor		
2016	Yeh Hai Aashiqui	Ayan Khanna		
2016	Naamkarann	Aladdin / Kabir		
2023–2024	Anupamaa	Tapish "Titu"		

==== Special appearances ====
Year	Title	Role	Ref.
2013	MasterChef India	Himself	
2017	Jhalak Dikhhla Jaa	Himself	
2019	Yeh Teri Galiyan	Himself	
2020	Fear Factor: Khatron Ke Khiladi 10	Himself	

=== Web series ===
Year	Title	Role	Notes	Ref.
2020	Lips Don't Lie	Arjun	Episode: "Satyam Shivam Sundaram"	
2025	Hai Junoon!	Rohit		

== See also ==
- List of dancers
- List of dance personalities
