= Sadiya Siddiqui =

Indian film and television actress

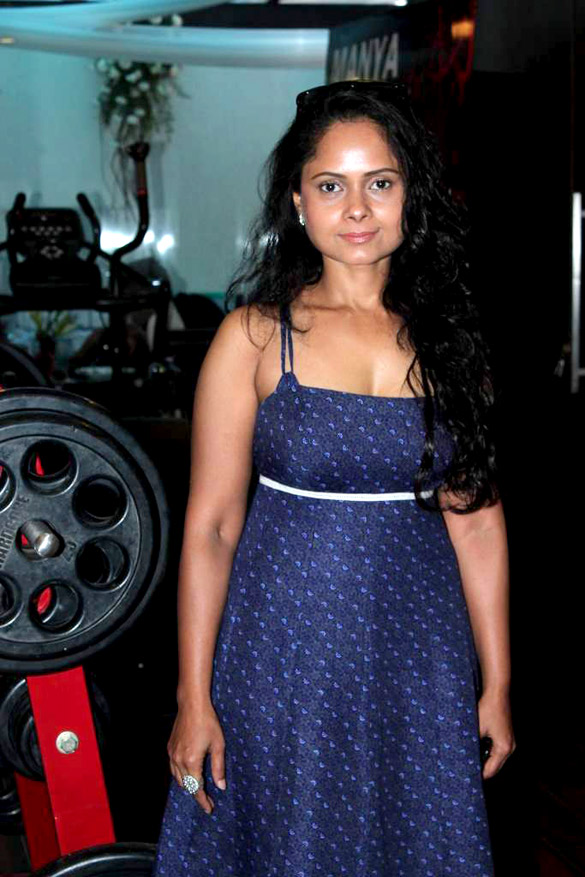
- Siddiqui in 2012
- Born: Mumbai, Maharashtra, India
- Occupation: Actress
- Years active: 1993–present
- Known for: Banegi Apni Baat; Tu Sooraj Main Saanjh, Piyaji; Balika Vadhu

Sadiya Siddiqui is an Indian film and television actress who rose to fame playing the role of Priya on the Zee Tv show Banegi Apni Baat. She is also known for playing Nanda in Star Plus's Tu Sooraj Main Saanjh, Piyaji. She won an ITA Award for her role as Sandhya in the famous TV series Balika Vadhu from 2008 to 2013.

== Filmography ==
=== Films ===
- 1993 Little Buddha
- 1994 Kabhi Haan Kabhi Naa as Nikki
- 1994 Drohkaal a supporting role
- 1997 Uff! Yeh Mohabbat as Chicklet
- 1998 Hitler as Priya
- 1998 Hazaar Chaurasi Ki Maa as Tuli's Friend
- 2002 Kali Salwaar as Sultana
- 2003 Raghu Romeo as Sweety
- 2004 Bombay Summer as Suneeta
- 2005 Shabd as Rajni
- 2007 Just Married as Anaiya
- 2009 Unn Hazaaron Ke Naam as Hina
- 2011 Jo Dooba So Paar: It's Love in Bihar! as Gulabo
- 2013 Baga Beach as Maggie
- 2014 Kill the Rapist? a supporting role
- 2014 CityLights as Sudha
- 2017 Ajji as leela
- 2021 Ramprasad ki Tehrvi as Pankaj's wife
- 2022 Holy Cow as Safiya
- 2023 The Great Indian Family as Hema
- 2024 Chote Nawab as Gullo
- 2026 Everybody Loves Sohrab Handa as Suman

=== Television ===
- 1993 Humrahi as a child bride
- 1993 Byomkesh Bakshi as Rajni in the episode "Tasvir Chor" (credited as Sadia Siddiqui)
- 1994–98 Banegi Apni Baat as Priyanka
- 1999-2000 Star Bestsellers
- 2001-02 Maan as Ginni
- 2002 Sanjivani as Richa Asthana
- 2005 Guns & Roses as Angie
- 2007-08 Sapna Babul Ka...Bidaai as Ragini’s dance teacher
- 2007 Saathi Re as Shalaka
- 2007 Saat Phere: Saloni Ka Safar as Gayatri
- 2008-13 Balika Vadhu as Sandhya
- 2010-12 Sasural Genda Phool as Radha
- 2011 Hum as Phulwa
- 2012 Na Bole Tum Na Maine Kuch Kaha as Prerana Prateek Agarwal
- 2013-14 Rangrasiya as Mala
- 2014 Yeh Hai Aashiqui as Tulsi (episodic role in episode 38)
- 2014-16 Satrangi Sasural as Priyanka
- 2014 Chashme Baddoor
- 2017-18 Tu Sooraj, Main Saanjh Piyaji as Nanda Devi Modani / Maasi Saa
- 2017-19 Yeh Un Dinon Ki Baat Hai as Adult Naina's voice
- 2020 PariWar- pyaar ke aagey war as Anju
- 2021 Barrister Babu as Thaku Maa

=== Theater ===
- 2015 – produced Song of the Swan, a play in English/Hindi
- 2018 – produced and acted in the play The Unexpected Man

== Accolades ==
- 2008 – Indian Television Academy Awards for Best Actress in a Supporting Role for Balika Vadhu
