= Jason Tham =

Indian-American dancer, choreographer and actor

- Born: Jason Tham; Jamaica, New York, U.S
- Education: Stratford University
- Occupations: Choreographer; Dancer; Actor
- Years active: 2011–present
- Style: Hip hop; Contemporary; Acro yoga; Aerial
- Spouse: Deeksha Sonalkar (m. 2021)
- Relatives: Minissha Lamba (sister-in-law until 2020)

Jason Tham is an Indian-American dancer, choreographer and actor of Chinese descent. He was a contestant on the reality dance competition Just Dance in India and played the role of Karma on Channel V dance-based show Dil Dosti Dance.

== Early and personal life ==
Tham was born the youngest of three children in New York to Chinese parents who moved to Delhi, India when he was young. He did his schooling from Don Bosco New Delhi and graduated from Stratford University in 2011. His parents own businesses in New Delhi, India. He started learning to dance in 2008 and is a self-taught actor, dancer and choreographer. He participated in a number of reality TV shows including Just Dance, Dance India Dance, AXN's India's minute to win it season 2 and NDTV's Swiss made dreams. Tham then moved to Mumbai in 2013 to further his career in the entertainment industry.

=== Personal life ===
In November 2021, Tham married his long-time girlfriend actress Deeksha Kanwal Sonalkar; the couple had confirmed their relationship in 2017 and became engaged on 22 August 2018.

== Just dance ==
Jason Tham competed on the Star Plus reality dance competition, Just Dance. He was the Top 21 contestants of Just Dance 2011. He appeared as a Dance Choreographer in Dance India Dance season 4 and Boogie Woogie.

== Acting career ==
Choreographer/ Choreographer Assistant	TV Channel
Reality shows	
Dance India Dance Supermoms Season 1	Zee TV
Dance India Dance Season 4	Zee TV
Boogie Woogie lil' champs	Sony
Jhalak dikhlaja	Colours
Dare 2 Dance	Life-OK
Dance India Dance Supermoms Season 2	Zee TV

=== Filmography ===
- 2014: Happy New Year
- 2016: Baaghi
- 2018: Race 3
- 2018: Happy Phirr Bhag Jayegi
- 2019: Bharat
- 2022: Rocket Gang

=== Television ===
TV show	TV Channel / OTT	Character played
Dil Dosti Dance	Channel V India	Karma Wangchuk
Dosti... Yariyaan... Manmarziyan	Star Plus	Teji
Agent Raghav - Crime Branch	&TV	Agent Bikram
Ek Deewaana Tha	Sony TV	Detective Freddy D’Mello
Sanjivani	Star Plus	Dr. Neil Lama Lau
Swaraj	DD National	Narendrajeth
Ranneeti: Balakot & Beyond	JioCinema	Victor Maisnam
Honeymoon Photographer	JioCinema	Elvin
The Family Man	Amazon Prime Video	Colonel Zhulong
