= Dil Ki Baatein Dil Hi Jaane =

2015 Indian soap opera

- Opening Sequence
- Genre: Drama; Romance
- Created by: Guroudev Bhalla
- Screenplay by: Zama Habib; Ghanshyam Bhatt; Dialogues; Vishal Sonekar
- Story by: Mahesh Bhatt; Zama Habib
- Directed by: Pushkar Pandit
- Creative director: Ishika Paramjeet Sahani
- Starring: See Below
- Theme music composer: Raju Singh
- Country of origin: India
- Original languages: Hindi; Malayalam
- No. of seasons: 1
- No. of episodes: 108

Production
- Producers: Dhaval Jayantilal Gada; Guroudev Bhalla
- Production locations: Mumbai, Maharashtra and Jaipur, Rajasthan
- Editor: Janak Chauhan
- Camera setup: Multi-camera
- Running time: 20 minutes
- Production companies: Dhaval and Guroudev Productions

Original release
- Network: Sony Entertainment Television
- Release: 23 March – 28 August 2015

Dil Ki Baatein Dil Hi Jaane is an Indian soap opera, which premiered on 23 March 2015 and was broadcast Sony TV, starring Ram Kapoor and Gurdeep Kohli as the main protagonists. It is loosely based on the semi-autobiography novel "A Taste of Life: The Last Days of UG Krishnamurti" by Mahesh Bhatt. The serial was dubbed into Malayalam and aires on Flowers TV under the title Mouna Ragam. The show also focused on the life of Cancer Patient. The series ended on 28 August 2015.

== Plot ==
The show follows Ram Ahuja, whose wife is suffering with blood cancer and wants to kill herself so her husband and her kids would stop worrying about her. Ram and both of their kids, Disha and Arav, (knowing the truth) support her for a speedy recovery.

The show starts with Disha and Arav doing commentary on the ongoing cricket match in their colony, while their parents Ram and Anandita playing cricket with other colony members. Anandita faints, and Ram and their children care for her.

Ram gets disturbed when he discovers Anandita cancer has relapsed. The doctor advises him to take Anandita to a cancer hospital. She refuses to go to the hospital and tells Ram to accept her willingness to die and her rejection of treatment. Anandita wishes to see her father, Mr. Kapoor, whom she left 18 years back.

When they reach her father's house, her younger sister, Monica and Monica's husband, Manav, shout at them and ask them to leave. Mr. Kapoor, her father, argues with her for leaving them 18 years back and was not ready to forgive her. On returning home, Disha argues with them for meeting Mr. Kapoor. Ram convinces Disha and Anandita thanks him for saying sorry to her father.

Ram plans a vacation for his family to Jodhpur, where they celebrate Anandita's birthday. Ahuja's family returns home from vacation. Anandita faints again and Ram calls for a local doctor. The doctor advises him to take her to a cancer specialist. Disha is shocked. At the hospital, Ram consoles Disha.

After few weeks, Anandita dies in the hospital. After her death, Mr. Kapoor argues with Ram and forces Disha and Arav to come home with him. Disha meets a lawyer who helps Disha and her family to get out of the situation. However, Ayan's family warned Ayan not to help Disha and Arav, as his dad, Suraj, is Mr. Kapoor's driver. Disha argues with Mr. Kapoor but is unable to do anything. Mr. Kapoor apologizes to everyone in the court, police arrest him and take him away.

=== 2 months later ===
Ayan asks Disha where to put a photo. They argue with each other. Mr. Ahuja tells them to keep quiet. Meanwhile, Arav brings a newspaper and shows him a photo in it. Ayan asks for a family photo. Ram, Disha, and Arav strike a pose and the show ends.

== Reception ==
Prathamesh Jadhav of india.com rated 3.5/5 saying, "The show offers a hatke watch. Indian Express rated 2.5 saying, Ram Kapoor's ‘Dil Ki Baatein Dil Hi Jaane’ ventures into uncharted territory." Mouthshut.com rated 3.5. Bollowoodlife.com rated 4/5 saying, "The story itself provides for a huge scope of melodrama and emotion that is ideal for small screen. Plus Anandita and Ram's daughter Mahima are promising. And hopefully, like her on-screen dad, Disha too will bring out fresh expressions that will be a breath of fresh air from the regular rona-dhonaa that we witness on television.'

== Cast ==
- Ram Kapoor as Ram Ahuja; Anandita's widower; Disha's and Aarav's father (2015)
- Gurdeep Kohli as Anandita Ram Ahuja / Anu; Disha's and Aarav's mother (2015) (Dead)
- Mahima Makwana as Disha Ram Ahuja; Ram and Anandita's daughter; Aarav's sister; Anand's granddaughter (2015)
- Pankaj Dheer as Anand Kapoor; Anandita and Monica's father; Disha and Aarav's grandfather (2015)
- Shrey Pareek as Ayan Suraj Mehra; Suraj's son; Ratnakar Shetty's employee
- Ratna Shinde as Aarav Ram Ahuja a.k.a. Aru
- Aashish Kaul as Suraj Mehra; Sudha's husband; Ayan's father; Anand's driver
- Kiran Janjani as Karan; Ram's Friend
- Sailesh Gulabani as Manav Sharma; Manika's husband; Anand's son-in-law (a resident son-in-law who lives in a house of his wife's family)
- Himanshi Choudhry as Manika Kapoor; Manav's wife
- Roma Bali as Sudha Mehra; Suraj's wife; Ayan's Mother
- Vishal Nayak
- Sai Deodhar as Barkha; Amit's wife; a singer at a Bar; Ram's friend
- Syed Ashraf Karim as Ratnakar Shetty LLB; Ayan's boss
- Unknown as Chandu; Ram's friend in jail

=== Guest Appearance ===
- Vidya Balan to promote her film Hamari Adhuri Kahani

== International broadcasting ==
Country	Network	Local title	Series premiere	Timeslot	Episodes
Somalia	Fanproj Series	Xal Maan U Waayay	April 27, 2016	19:00	108
