= Mihir Mishra =

Indian television actor (born 1976)

- Born: 19 December 1976 (age 49); Delhi, India
- Occupation: Actor
- Years active: 2002–present
- Spouse: Manini De (m. 2004; sep. 2020)

Mihir Mishra is an Indian television actor. He is well known for his role of Dr. Rahul Mehra in Star Plus's show Sanjivani.

== Career ==
Mishra made his television debut with Star Plus's show Sanjivani, where he played the lead role of Dr. Rahul Mehra. After that he did various TV shows like Kumkum, Saat Phere – Saloni Ka Safar, Dil Se Diya Vachan, Ek Nayi Chhoti Si Zindagi. He was also the contestant of Nach Baliye 1. He has also done some episodic roles in C.I.D. and Adaalat. He was last seen in Dil Dosti Dance as Reyaansh's father on Channel V India. He played the role of Akash Roy in Star Plus's Ek Hasina Thi. Mihir Mishra played the role of Rohit who is Pooja's husband opposite Riva Bubber in BSNL Cellone. He played the role of a senior doctor whose name is Dr. Sinha in Zindagi Wins on Bindass. He did various TV commercials such as Red Tape, Sony Handycam, Sunsilk, BSNL, VICCO, MC Cain Foods India and Tata AIA Life. He played the role of Mr. Rawal who is Leela's father in Jaane Kya Hoga Rama Re on Life OK.

== Personal life ==
Mishra studied at Air Force Balbharti in New Delhi. Mishra married his co-star Manini De from Sanjivani on 30 December 2004 and the couple have a daughter named Dianoor. They separated in 2020.

== Television ==
Year	Serial	Role
2002–2005	Sanjivani	Dr. Rahul Mehra
2004–2005	Kabhi Haan Kabhi Naa	Aditya Ramachandran
2005	Aahat 2	Vishesh
2005	Yeh Meri Life Hai	Gautam
2005	Hotel Kingston	Aryan
2005	Nach Baliye 1	Himself
2005–2006	Hare Kkaanch Ki Choodiyaan	Vikram Singhania
2006	Saarrthi	
2006	Darna Mana Hai	Rithwik
2006	Jodi Kamaal Ki	Himself
2006	C.I.D.	Kennyraj
2006	Akela	Dr.Rohit
2006–2007	Kumkum	Dr. Vikram Kapoor
2006–2008	Ssshhhh...Phir Koi Hai – Kaun Hai	Dr. Tarun
2007	Meri Awaz Ko Mil Gayi Roshni	Rishi Oberoi
2007	Aahat 3	Siddharth
2007	Zaara	Dr.Farhan
2007	Durgesh Nandinii	Pawan Khanna
2007–2008	Jamegi Jodi.Com	Angad
2008	Hadsa	Deepak
2008	Jiya Jale	
2008	Jasuben Jayantilaal Joshi Ki Joint Family	Abhishek
2008	Saat Phere – Saloni Ka Safar	Dr.Varun
2008	Ssshhhh...Phir Koi Hai – Virasat	Varun Pratap Singh
2009	Kya Mast Hai Life	Mr. Mehra
2009–2010	Jhumkie	Krishna Kapoor
2010	Jaane Pehchaane Se Ye Ajnabbi	Dr.Dhruv Khanna
2010–2011	Dil Se Diya Vachan	Pratham Rajadhyaksha
2011	Ek Nayi Chhoti Si Zindagi	Girish Ojha
2012	Humse Hai Liife	Arun Oberoi (Raghav's father)
2012–2013	Adaalat	Episodic roles
2012	Ek Hazaaron Mein Meri Behna Hai	Dr. Rahul Mehra
2013	Fear Files	
2013	The Buddy Project	Shaurya Gujral
2013	Devon Ke Dev...Mahadev	King Dasharath
2013	Dil Dostii Dance	Ranvijay Singhania
2014	Firangee	Dr.Arshad Ali
2014	Ek Hasina Thi	Akash Roy / Akram Rehmat Khan
2014	Savdhaan India	Sahil
2014	Gustakh Dil	A builder
2015	Zindagi Wins	Dr. Sinha
2015–2016	Jaane Kya Hoga Rama Re	Mr. Raval who is Leela's father
2016	Krishanadasi	Mahant Yashwant Chimaji
2016–2017	Zindagi Ki Mehek	Harish Khanna
2017	Savdhaan India	Dr. Sahil Sehgal
2017–2018	Ishq Mein Marjawan	Prithvi
2019	Laal Ishq	Siddharth
2020	Brahmarakshas 2	Raghav Sharma
2020	Kehne Ko Humsafar Hain	Angad
2020	Savdhaan India	Dr. Mahesh Dubey
2021	Ishq Mein Marjawan 2	Ajay Raisinghania
2022	Corporate Sarpanch	Mahendra Singh
2022	Tu Zakhm Hai	Shamsher Trehan
