= Vinti Idnani =

Indian television actress (born 1991)

- Born: 29 November 1991; India
- Occupation: Actress
- Years active: present
- Known for: Jaane Kya Hoga Rama Re

Vinti Idnani is an Indian television actress, who has appeared in Hindi television series, like Bade Achhe Lagte Hain, Dil Dosti Dance, and Ek Tha Chander Ek Thi Sudha. Currently, she is seen in Jaane Kya Hoga Rama Re as of March 2016.

== Filmography ==
- Uvaa
- Main Tera Hero as Train Girl

== Television ==
- Sony TV's Bade Achhe Lagte Hain as Myrah Ram Kapoor
- Star Plus's Ek Hazaaron Mein Meri Behna Hai special appearance as Vishakha (performance on Bole Chudiyan)
- Channel V's Dil Dosti Dance as Vishakha
- Life OK's Ek Tha Chander Ek Thi Sudha & Jaane Kya Hoga Rama Re as Nandini/Nandu/
- Star Plus's Arjun (TV series) as Dolly (Episode 103)
- Zing's Pyaar tune Kya kiya (TV series) as Tanya (Episode 21)
