= Kiran Janjani =

Indian actor

Karan Uday Jenjani
- Born: 12 March; Mumbai, India
- Education: SVKM's NMIMS
- Occupation: Actor
- Years active: 1998–present
- Spouse: Ritu Janjani

Kiran Janjani is an India actor who works in Bollywood films and television shows. He is well known for his performance as Vikas Nanda in Life OK's Hum Ne Li Hai- Shapath and as Ujjwal Mishra in &TV's Santoshi Maa. He was last seen in Zee TV's Yeh Teri Galiyan as Arindham Mazumdar.

== Biography ==
Janjani was born in Mumbai to a Sindhi Hindu family on 12 March.

Janjani acted in a number of TV commercials. He studied at Colegio Cosmopolitano de Colombia. He graduated from SVKM's NMIMS, Mumbai. He is married to Ritoo k Jenjani, who is a make up designer. He also acted in Falguni Pathak's Song "Yaad pia ki aane lagi" with Riya Sen and also featured in song "Dil dil nahin raha mera" from Harry Anand's album Chaahat.

Kiran has deep faith in numerology. A numerologist suggested him to change his name multiple times because it may bring bad luck to him. At first he refused to do so, however, after series of incidents he changed his mind. After the birth of their daughter, Kiran legally changed his name to Karanuday Jenjani. "Karanuday" is the name listed in his Janampatri. Although his name is Karanuday now, many of his friends and the industry still refer him as Kiran.

== Television ==
Year	Show	Role
2012	Hum Ne Li Hai- Shapath	Vikaas Nanda
2013	C.I.D.	Inspector Vardhan / Monty
2015	Dil Ki Baatein Dil Hi Jaane	Karan; Ram's friend
2015	Pyaar Tune Kya Kiya	Sandeep
2015–2017	Santoshi Maa	Ujjwal Mishra
2018	Ishqbaaaz	Abhimanyu Raheja
2018	Udaan	Raw Agent Abhay
2018	Yeh Teri Galiyan	Arindham Mazumdar
