= The Silence (2015 film) =

- Poster of Anjali Patil in The Silence
- Directed by: Gajendra Ahire
- Story by: Ashwini Sidwani
- Produced by: Navneet Hullad Moradabadi; Arun Tyagi; Ashwini Sidwani; Arpan Bhukhanwala
- Starring: Nagraj Manjule; Raghubir Yadav; Anjali Patil; Mugdha Chaphekar
- Cinematography: Krishna Soren
- Edited by: Mayur Hardas
- Music by: Indian Ocean
- Production company: SMR FILMS
- Release dates: 18 July 2015 (12th Indian Film Festival Stuttgart); 6 October 2017 (India)
- Running time: 90 minutes
- Country: India
- Language: Marathi

The Silence is a 2015 Indian Marathi drama film directed by Gajendra Ahire. The film stars the Sairat director Nagraj Manjule, Raghubir Yadav, Mugdha Chaphekar and Anjali Patil.

== Plot ==
The Silence is based on a true story and revolves around a little girl Chini, who lives with her father in Konkan. Life is going well until one fateful day when her loved one turns into the one she despises for the rest of her life.

== Cast ==
- Raghubir Yadav as Baba
- Nagraj Manjule as Uncle
- Anjali Patil as Maami
- Mugdha Chaphekar as 21 years old Chini
- Kadambari Kadam as Manda
- Mihiresh Joshi as Shirya
- Vedashree Mahajan as 12 years old Chini
- Suresh Vishwakarma as Arjunbhai

== Release ==
The Silence had its world premiere at the 12th Indian Film Festival in Stuttgart on 18 July 2015. It was released in India in Maharashtra on 6 October 2017.

== Critical reception ==
Deborah Young of The Hollywood Reporter wrote, "Director Gajendra Ahire creates a resonant drama around the terrible choices facing Indian women involved in sexual violence." Mihir Bhanage of The Times of India complimented the writer and director of the film commenting, "Ashwini Sidwani's story is as real as it can get and Ahire's treatment does justice to it. The presentation is so impactful that it is bound to make you think." The critic also praised the acting performances of Manjule, Yadav and Patil saying that "Gajendra and Ashwini's work is complemented brilliantly by the actors in the film" and gave the film a rating of 4 out of 5. Johnson Thomas of The Free Press Journal gave the film a rating of 3.5 out of 5 and wrote, "The film is a powerful and heartfelt document of the kind of exploitation that women are subjected to and the trauma and aftermath they undergo in order to regain a healthy sense of self." Pradeep Menon of Firstpost gave the film a rating of 3.5 out of 5 and wrote, "The Silence will affect you even though it doesn't tell you anything you don't know. You know women aren't treated equally everywhere, but you don't know what these women – and women in these situations out in the real world – have to go through." Business Standard appreciated the performances of Nagraj Manjule and Anjali Patil saying that "Whatever the blemishes in this brave and often powerful film, the central idea is resoundingly well executed by the two central performances" and gave the film a rating of 4 out of 5. Ajay Kulye of Marathi Cineyug gave the film a rating of 3.5 out of 5 and said that "If you want to watch meaningful and serious cinema about present day scenarios in our society, you should not miss The Silence".

== Soundtrack ==
"Dehavara Korlya Janm Khuna"

Single by Himanshu Joshi & Rahul Ram

from the album The Silence
- Language: Marathi
- Released: October 2, 2017
- Length: 5:37
- Label: Zee Music Company
- Composer: Indian Ocean
- Lyricist: Gajendra Ahire
- Producer: Indian Ocean

The soundtrack of The Silence consists of just one song, "Dehavara Korlya Janm Khuna", which was composed by Indian Ocean, written by Gajendra Ahire and sung by Himanshu Joshi and Rahul Ram.

== Awards ==
The Silence has won honours at several national and international film festivals, including the Best Child Actor award (for Vedashree) at the 16th New York Indian Film Festival and the German Star Of India (for Gajendra) at the Indian Film Festival of Stuttgart 2015.
