= Hemal Ingle =

Indian actress (born 1996)

- Born: Hemal Devendra Ingle; 2 March 1996 (age 30); Kolhapur, Maharashtra, India
- Other name: Hemal Dev
- Education: Fergusson College Shivaji University
- Occupations: Actress; model
- Years active: 2015 – present
- Spouse: Raunak Chordia (m. 2025)
- Parents: Devendra Ingle (father); Dhanshree Ingle (mother)

Hemal Ingle (born 2 March 1996) also known as Hemal Dev is an Indian actress and model primarily works in Marathi films. She made her debut in 2018 with the Telugu film Husharu and lead actress in Marathi films like Ashi Hi Aashiqui (2019), Roop Nagar Ke Cheetey (2022), Unaad (2023), and Navra Maza Navsacha 2 (2024). The latter earned ₹25 crore and emerged as the second highest-grossing Marathi film of 2024, as well as the highest-grossing film of her career.

== Early life and education ==
Hemal Ingle was born in Kolhapur on 2 March 1996 into a Marathi family. Her father is a LIC consultant and mother is a housewife. She studied from Fergusson College and Shivaji University. She also uses the name Hemal Dev, dev is taken from her father's first name.

== Career ==
Hemal Ingle was pursuing a degree in Quantitative Economics when she made her debut with the 2018 Telugu film Husharu. Ingle also won beauty pageants such as Miss University India 2015, Miss Earth India Fire 2016, and Miss India Exquisite–Queen for 2016–17.

In 2019 Sachin Pilgaonkar cast her in romantic drama Ashi Hi Aashiqui along with Abhinay Berde. In October 2020, she was featured in a Marathi romance song "Swapnatlya". She made her web series debut with the Hotstar series 1962: The War in the Hills. The series aired on 23 February 2021 starring Abhay Deol as the lead actor. Saibal Chatterjee of NDTV wrote "especially good" for Ingle's performance in the series.

In 2022 she was appeared in Roop Nagar Ke Cheetey. Ingle was featured in Umrella and Aditya Sarpotdar's Critically acclaimed Unaad in 2023. Ingle made her debut as an anchor during IPL 2024. She was appeared opposite Swapnil Joshi in Navra Maza Navsacha 2 in 2024, the film earned ₹25 crore and emerged as the second highest-grossing Marathi film of 2024.

She will be next portrays in Mahaparinirvan subsequently works on mystery film Thakabai, alongside Shubhankar Tawde and Taboo a film directed by Pushkar Jog resulting second collaboration between Jog and Ingle.

== Filmography ==
=== Film ===
Key
| † | Denotes films that have not yet been released |

| Year | Film | Role | Language | Ref(s) |
|---|---|---|---|---|
| 2018 | Husharu | Sowmya | Telugu | |
| 2019 | Ashi Hi Aashiqui | Amarja Kulkarni | Marathi | |
| 2021 | Power Play | Keerthy | Telugu | |
| 2022 | Roop Nagar Ke Cheetey | Devika | Marathi | |
| 2023 | Umbrella | Ashwini Patil | Marathi | |
| 2023 | Unaad | Swara | Marathi | |
| 2024 | Navra Maza Navsacha 2 | Shraddha Deshpande | Marathi | |
| 2025 | Hardik Shubhechha | Radhika Pathak | Marathi | |
| 2026 | One Two Cha Cha Chaa | Mishty | Hindi | |
| TBA | Mahaparinirvaan † | TBA | Marathi | |
| TBA | Taboo † | TBA | Marathi | |
| TBA | Thakabai † | TBA | Marathi | |

=== Television ===
| Year | Title | Role | Language | Ref(s) |
|---|---|---|---|---|
| 2021–2022 | Vidrohi | Princess Kalyani | Hindi | |

=== Web series ===
| Year | Title | Role | Language | Ref(s) |
|---|---|---|---|---|
| 2021 | 1962: The War in the Hills | Radha | Hindi | |

=== Music video ===
| Year | Title | Language | Ref(s) |
|---|---|---|---|
| 2018 | "Aayat Bane Hum" | Hindi | |
| 2020 | "Swapnatlya" | Marathi | |

== Personal life ==
In August 2024, Ingle got engaged to her longtime boyfriend, Raunak Chordia. In January 2025, they got married.
