= Power Play (2021 film) =

2021 Indian film

- Official poster
- Directed by: Vijay Kumar Konda
- Produced by: Abhishek Agarwal; T. G. Vishwa Prasad; Mahidhar; Devesh
- Starring: Raj Tarun; Hemal Ingle
- Cinematography: I. Andrew
- Edited by: Prawin Pudi
- Music by: Suresh Bobbili
- Production company: People Media Factory
- Release date: 5 March 2021
- Country: India
- Language: Telugu

Power Play is a 2021 Indian Telugu language crime thriller film directed by Vijay Kumar Konda, of Gunde Jaari Gallanthayyinde fame. It stars Raj Tarun, Hemal Ingle, Poorna in the main roles. The film was released on 5 March 2021 on Amazon Prime Video.

== Plot ==
Vijay Kumar Konda (Raj Tarun) is a young man whose marriage to his girlfriend Keerthy (Hemal Ingle) is approved by both of their families. To celebrate, Vijay and Keerthy attend a party at a bar. After Vijay pays the bill, an employee claims that the currency notes he used are counterfeit. Despite Vijay's attempts to explain that the money was recently withdrawn from an ATM, he is arrested by the police.

At the time, the police department is facing public scrutiny over a case involving the son of a powerful politician and is desperately seeking a distraction. Seeing Vijay's case as an opportunity, the police present him to the media as a member of a major counterfeit currency racket despite having little evidence against him.

The public humiliation severely affects Vijay's life. Keerthy's father calls off their wedding, and Vijay also loses his government job offer. Determined to clear his name, Vijay begins investigating the source of the fake notes. He visits the ATM from which he withdrew the money, hoping to gather evidence proving the notes came directly from the machine. He asks nearby shop owners for CCTV footage from that night, but none of them cooperate. Vijay then approaches the bank for the ATM surveillance footage, but the bank manager avoids him, arousing his suspicion.

The manager secretly informs a man named Ajay about Vijay's inquiries, prompting Ajay to order Vijay's murder. However, due to a mistake, Ajay's henchmen ram Vijay's father with a truck instead of Vijay. Realizing that a larger conspiracy is involved, Vijay teams up with a private detective and kidnaps the bank manager for information. Although terrified, the manager refuses to reveal anything significant, only warning Vijay that the people behind the conspiracy are extremely powerful and would kill him if he spoke out.

Vijay and his friends later bribe an employee at a business located near the ATM in exchange for access to its CCTV footage. While examining the footage, the business owner unexpectedly returns, forcing Vijay to hide inside the office. Vijay then witnesses a group of gangsters storm into the building and threaten the owner at gunpoint, accusing him of blackmailing their boss and demanding a video recording. The gangsters abduct the owner, but Vijay and his friends manage to rescue him.

The owner finally reveals the footage the gangsters were searching for: a video showing minister Poorna (Poorna) shooting a man named Ravi (Prince Cecil) to death in front of the ATM. Vijay realizes why those powerful people were stopping him from obtaining the ATM footage.

Poorna's men later take Vijay and Keerthy's families hostage in an attempt to recover the video. Vijay hides in the house of Ravi's widow, who reveals that Poorna and Ravi had been having an affair. However, Ravi had refused to abandon his family for Poorna, leading her to murder him in anger. Ravi's widow admits that she remained silent to protect her son.

Poorna eventually learns Vijay's location and sends her men to kill him. Vijay escapes and flees to a police station, where he starts a livestream exposing the entire conspiracy to the public and releases the footage of Poorna murdering Ravi.

Unable to bear the exposure, Poorna commits suicide. The police officers involved in the cover-up are arrested, Vijay's name is cleared, and he marries Keerthy.

== Cast ==
- Raj Tarun as Vijay Kumar Konda
- Hemal Ingle as Keerthy
- Poorna as Poorna, CM candidate
- Kota Srinivasa Rao
- Prince Cecil as Ravi
- Madhu Sudhan as SI Karim
- Ajay
- Raja Ravindra
- Pooja Ramachandran

== Reception ==
Thadhagath Pathi of The Times of India opined that "Power Play starts out well but goes down a slippery slope as the film progresses. A better treatment would’ve made this a must-watch." A critic from Telugucinema.com said that "Director Vijay Kumar Konda attempts a thriller for the first time and tries to narrate two parallel plots side by side and tries to mix them in the end. But the way he treats the scenes is not that impressive and it ends up as a bore".
