= Jaane Kya Hoga Rama Re =

Indian television series

- Genre: Drama
- Created by: Shobhana Desai
- Starring: See below
- Country of origin: India
- Original language: Hindi
- No. of seasons: 01
- No. of episodes: 100

Production
- Producer: Shobhana Desai
- Production locations: Mumbai, Maharashtra, India
- Camera setup: Multi-camera
- Production company: Shobhana Desai Productions

Original release
- Network: Life OK
- Release: 16 November 2015 – 1 April 2016

Jaane Kya Hoga Rama Re was an Indian drama television series that premiered on 16 November 2015, and was broadcast on Life OK. The series is produced by Shobhana Desai Productions.

Jatin Sharma, Vinti Idnani, and Supriya Pathak have been finalized to play the lead roles respectively in the series. Deepak Dutta will portray the character of a typical drunkard with a good heart, while Supriya Pathak will play the role of a powerful woman.

== Cast ==
- Jatin Sharma as Raju Kaushik
- Vinti Idnani as Nandini "Nandu" Kar
- Fahad Ali as Shekhar "Sunny" Talwar
- Deepak Dutta as Dev Kaushik
- Supriya Pathak as Rambhateri
- Mihir Mishra as Mr. Rawal
- Paras Singh Minhas as Pratap
- Varsha Usgaonkar as Indu Talwar
- Anjali Gupta as Garima
- Aishwarya Khare as Rashmi
