= Gurdeep Kohli =

Indian television actress

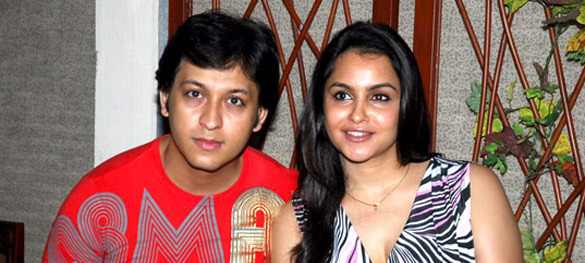
- Gurdeep with her husband, Arjun Punj
- Born: Gurdeep Kaur Kohli; 30 January 1980 (age 46); Mumbai, Maharashtra, India
- Occupations: Model; actress; television presenter
- Years active: 1995–present
- Known for: Best of Luck Nikki
- Spouse: Arjun Punj (m. 2006)
- Children: 2

Gurdeep Kohli (born 30 January 1980), also known by her married name Gurdeep Punj, is an Indian actress who works in Hindi television. She is known for her television roles as Hemani Singh in Best of Luck Nikki, Dr. Juhi in Sanjivani, and Bani in Kasamh Se.

== Early and personal life ==
Gurdeep Kaur Kohli is of Punjabi descent. She was born in Mumbai, Maharashtra into a Sikh family.

== Career ==
=== Television ===
Gurdip started her career as a model for advertisements on Indian television. She then appeared in Falguni Pathak's music video "Haire Mere Hui Gulabi". The most important role in her career was Dr. Juhi Singh on Sanjivani which earned her accolades. She later worked in Zee TV's Sinndoor Tere Naam Ka. She was part of STAR One's Jet Set Go and Nach Baliye 2 with her husband Arjun Punj. Later on she appeared in Kasamh Se as Pronita Walia Mitra née, who later turns out to be Bani Jai Walia. She was seen in Best Of Luck Nikki as Hemani Singh. She is hosting her own cooking program named Bacha Party and ABC (All 'Bout Cooking) on Zee Khana Khazana. She played a negative role in Diya Aur Baati Hum and in Dil Ki Baatein Dil Hi Jaane. She played the role of "Sethji" Ahilya Devi in the Zee TV show Sethji. She acted in Kehne Ko Humsafar Hain, on ALTBalaji, along with Ronit Roy and Mona Singh. She portrayed Jodha Bai in Colors TV's Dastaan-E-Mohabbat: Salim Anarkali. She again portrayed Dr. Juhi Singh in Sanjivani 2 which premiered on 12 August 2019.

From June 2023 to September 2024, she played the role of Bhoomi Mahajan in Sony SAB's political business drama Vanshaj.

=== Film ===
Gurdip debuted in the 2012 Bollywood film Rowdy Rathore, which was directed by Prabhu Deva. She also appeared in the 2019 film Student of the Year 2, as Anamika Bani.

== Personal life ==
After years of working on television and as a model, Gurdip married Arjun Punj, her co-star from Sanjivani, on 10 December 2006. The couple have two children, a daughter named Meher, born in 2010 and a son named Mahir, born in 2015.

== Filmography ==
Year	Film	Role	Notes
2012	Rowdy Rathore	Razia Khan	Supporting role
2019	Student of the Year 2	Anamika Bani	
2023	Dono	Shilpa Kothari	

=== Television ===
Year	Serial	Role	Notes
2002–2005	Sanjivani	Dr. Juhi Singh	
2005–2006	Sinndoor Tere Naam Ka	Vedika Agarwal / Vedika Dhruv Raizada	
2006	Jet Set Go	Contestant	
2006	Nach Baliye 2	Contestant	
2007	Durgesh Nandinii	Pawan Khanna's wife	
2007–2008	Bhabhi	Geetanjali Sabharwal / Geetanjali Dev Thakral	
2008–2009	Kasamh Se	Pronita Jai Walia / Bani Jai Walia	
2011–2016	Best of Luck Nikki	Himani Singh	
2012	Adaalat	Drishti	
2013	Lakhon Mein Ek	Anu	Episode 22
2013	Arjun	Senior Inspector Meenakshi Dixit	Episode 124
2013	Bacha Party	Host	
2014	Diya Aur Baati Hum	Maya / Baiji	
2015	Dil Ki Baatein Dil Hi Jaane	Anandita Ram Ahuja / Anu	
2017	Sethji	Ahilya Devi	
2018, 2019, 2020	Kehne Ko Humsafar Hain	Poonam Mehra	Web series
2018–2019	Dastaan-E-Mohabbat Salim Anarkali	Jodha Bai	
2019	Naagin 3	Poonam Mehra	To promote Kehne Ko Humsafar Hain 2
2019	All About Cooking	Host	
2019–2020	Sanjivani 2	Dr. Juhi Singh	
2021	Humkadam	Shanti	
2021	Kyun Utthe Dil Chhod Aaye	Kaveri Pratap Singh	
2023–2024	Vanshaj	Bhoomi Mahajan	
2025	Kumkum Bhagya	Smita Zaveri	
2026	Lakshmi Niwas	Vandana Sahu	
2026	Taara	Chandani Rathod	
