= Honeymoon Photographer =

- Promotional release poster
- Genre: Crime; Thriller
- Written by: Karmanya Ahuja
- Directed by: Arjun Srivastava
- Starring: Asha Negi; Rajeev Siddhartha; Apeksha Porwal; Sahil Salathia; Jason Tham; Samvedna Suwalka
- Music by: Shivam Sengupta; Anuj Danait
- Country of origin: India
- Original language: Hindi
- No. of episodes: 6

Production
- Producer: Rishab Seth
- Production location: Maldives
- Cinematography: Santosh Vasandi
- Editor: Arjun Srivastava
- Camera setup: Multi-camera
- Running time: 26-33 mins
- Production company: Green Light Productions

Original release
- Network: JioCinema
- Release: 27 September 2024

Honeymoon Photographer is an Indian crime thriller television series directed by Arjun Srivastava and written by Karmanya Ahuja. Produced by Rishab Seth under Green Light Productions, starring Asha Negi, Rajeev Siddhartha, Apeksha Porwal, Sahil Salathia, Jason Tham and Samvedna Suwalka. It premiered on JioCinema on 27 September 2024.

== Cast ==
- Asha Negi as Ambika Nath
- Rajeev Siddhartha as Zubin
- Apeksha Porwal as Zoya
- Sahil Salathia as Adhir
- Jason Tham as Elvin
- Samvedna Suwalka as Divya
- Ashmita Jaggi as Brinda
- Raymon Kakkar as Nina
- Rituraj Singh as Romesh
- Simran Gangwani as Malvika
- Saurabh Sharma as Inspector Rafique
- Kunal Parwani as Arvind Sakuja
- Aabid Shamim as Nimish
- Dia Jain as Ria
- Chaitanya Suvanam as Inspector Gambhir

== Production ==
The series was announced on JioCinema. The trailer of the series was released on 19 September 2024.

== Reception ==
Amit Bhatia of ABP News awarded the series 2/5 stars. Archika Khurana of The Times of India gave it 2 1/2 out of 5 stars. Risha Ganguly of Times Now rated the series 3/5 stars.
