= Love, Sitara =

- Official release poster
- Directed by: Vandana Kataria
- Written by: Sonia Bahl; Abbas Dalal; Hussain Dalal; Vandana Kataria
- Produced by: Ronnie Screwvala
- Starring: Sobhita Dhulipala; Rajeev Siddhartha
- Cinematography: Szymon Lenkowski; Sidharth Kale
- Edited by: Paramita Ghosh; Namrata Rao
- Music by: Songs: Sangeet-Siddharth; Score: Shrikanth Sriram
- Production company: RSVP Movies
- Distributed by: ZEE5
- Release date: 27 September 2024
- Running time: 105 minutes
- Country: India
- Language: Hindi

Love, Sitara is a 2024 Indian Hindi-language drama film directed by Vandana Kataria. Produced by Ronnie Screwvala under RSVP Movies, it stars Sobhita Dhulipala and Rajeev Siddhartha. It was released on ZEE5 on 27 September 2024 to positive reviews from critics.

== Premise ==
Love, Sitara (2024) follows Sitara, a successful interior designer, who impulsively proposes to her longtime on-off boyfriend Arjun, a chef, and insists on marrying at her grandmother's house in Kerala. As the family gathers, old secrets resurface: Sitara suspects her father of an affair with her aunt, while her mother and grandmother reveal their own painful histories of betrayal. Amidst the wedding preparations, Sitara's hidden pregnancy and confession of infidelity shatter her relationship with Arjun, who calls off the wedding. Choosing honesty over hypocrisy, Sitara decides to keep the child despite uncertain paternity, and later reconciles with Arjun in Singapore, where they agree to raise the baby together. A year later, they marry, symbolizing forgiveness, resilience, and the power of truth in love across generations

== Cast ==
- Sobhita Dhulipala as Sitara
- Rajeev Siddhartha as Arjun
- Sonali Kulkarni as Hema Chechi
- Sankar Induchoodan as Bharath Menon
- B. Jayashree as Amumma
- Virginia Rodrigues as Latha, Sitara's mother
- Sanjay Bhutiani as Govind, Sitara's father
- Tamara D’Souza as Anjali
- Rijul Ray as Majeed
- Neeraja Rajendran as Mrs Arvind

== Production ==
Pre-production for Sitara began in 2019, when Sobhita Dhulipala was cast as the lead. Principal photography commenced by February 2020, but was delayed till November 2020 due to the COVID-19 pandemic. The film was mainly shot in Mumbai and Kerala before wrapping in December 2020. The trailer of the film was released on 12 September 2024.

== Music ==
Love Sitara

Soundtrack album by Sangeet-Siddharth
- Released: September 24, 2024
- Genre: Feature film soundtrack
- Length: 15:51
- Language: Hindi
- Label: Zee Music Company

Official audio
- Love Sitara - Full Album on YouTube

The soundtrack was composed by Sangeet-Siddharth, with lyrics by Rashmin Dighe and Garima Obrah.

Track listing
No.	Title	Lyrics	Singer(s)	Length
1.	"Ungliyon Pe"	Garima Obrah	Anusha Mani, Harshdeep Kaur, Shalmali Kholgade	3:53
2.	"Hai Dil Dariya"	Rashmin Dighe	Sangeet Haldipur	4:40
3.	"Tera Jashn Manana Hai"	Rashmin Dighe	Armaan Malik, Sangeet Haldipur	3:31
4.	"Munda Marriage Material"	Rashmin Dighe	Benny Dayal, Jonita Gandhi	3:47
Total length:				15:51

== Release ==
In September 2020, it was announced that the film was heading for a streaming release on an OTT platform in 2021. It premiered on ZEE5 on 27 September 2024.

== Reception ==
Love, Sitara received positive reviews from critics.

The film received a 3 stars out of 5 review in The Times of India, in which Sreeparna Sengupta praised the acting. "Only for the restraint it shows in its telling, Love, Sitara deserves a like, if not exactly love.", commented Vinamra Mathur in FIrstpost. Writing for Times Now News Mimansa Shekhar stated, "Relatable in parts, pleasant in the rest. A breezy watch through the inner depths of a family that might be fighting a war on he outside, but are tied up in the same thread from within. A déjà vu!" The film was described by Saibal Chatterjee of NDTV as "unpretentious and steadfastly simple".

A review in The Hindu noted, "The biggest hitch is the writing, which tacks indiscriminately between English and Hindi (with sprinklings of Malayalam)." In a review for The Hindustan Times, Rishabh Suri wrote, "Sobhita Dhulipala's family drama loses pace quickly, leaves you underwhelmed". "Sonali Kulkarni brings an easy gravitas to a film marred by melodrama", stated Kartik Bhardwaj in Cinema Express.

The film received another mixed review, in The New Indian Express, which concluded "Sometimes films are like that, neither good or bad, merely meh." The Deccan Chronicle praised, again, the intention, but criticised the screenplay and acting, stating "Filled with clichés and predictability, the film lacks in performance and even more in emotional value."
