= Pratibha Paul =

Indian television actress

- Born: India
- Occupation: Actress
- Years active: present

Pratibha Paul is an Indian television actress, who appears in television series like Dil Dosti Dance, Bhanwar, Bharat Ka Veer Putra – Maharana Pratap and Aahat (season 6).

== Television ==
- Channel V's Dil Dosti Dance
- Sony TV's Bhanwar, Bharat Ka Veer Putra – Maharana Pratap and Aahat (season 6)
