= Mugdha Chaphekar =

Indian actress

- Born: 24 March 1987 (age 39); Mumbai, Maharashtra, India
- Occupation: Actress
- Years active: 1995; 2001; 2006–present
- Known for: Dharti Ka Veer Yodha Prithviraj Chauhan; Kumkum Bhagya
- Spouse: Ravish Desai (m. 2016; div. 2025)

Mugdha Chaphekar is an Indian actress who predominantly works in Hindi-language television and Marathi-language television productions and films. She is best known for her role as Princess Sanyogita in the Star Plus's historical drama Dharti Ka Veer Yodha Prithviraj Chauhan and for her role as Prachi Arora Kohli in Zee TV's romantic drama Kumkum Bhagya.

Chaphekar also worked in the film The Silence for which she won the Maharashtra State Award for Best Debut Female in 2016.

== Career ==
Mugdha Chaphekar first appeared as a child artist in the Bollywood movie Aazmayish. Later in 2001, she appeared in the television series Junior G as Shelly. Chaphekar made her television debut as an adult artist with the show Kya Mujhse Dosti Karoge in 2006.

Chaphekar had her first lead role in Star Plus's epic historical series Dharti Ka Veer Yodha Prithviraj Chauhan where she played Princess Sanyogita. This was followed by roles in Dharam Veer and Mere Ghar Aayi Ek Nanhi Pari.

In 2009, she joined Sab TV's comedy drama show Sajan Re Jhoot Mat Bolo as Aarti Jhaveri. The show enjoyed quite long run of two and half years and ended in 2011. She also worked in the show's spin off Golmaal Hai Bhai Sab Golmaal Hai as Dhwani

In mid 2014, she joined Zee TV's daily soap opera Satrangi Sasural as Aarushi opposite Ravish Desai whom she later married in December 2016. Her role ended in September 2015. She also appeared in the short film Sumati in 2019.

She made her debut in Marathi television with the show Gulmohar as Kalindi in 2018.

In March 2019, Chaphekar joined the cast of Zee's Kumkum Bhagya opposite Krishna Kaul. Chaphekar received widespread popularity after her portrayal of Prachi Arora/Mehra Kohli. After being a part of the show for almost five years her role in the series came to an indefinite end in June 2024.

In September 2022, She was seen in Marathi language movie Roop Nagar Ke Cheetey.

== Personal life ==
Chaphekar met actor Ravish Desai on the sets of her series Satrangi Sasural, in 2014. The couple got engaged on 30 January 2016. Chaphekar married Desai on 14 December 2016. In April 2025, Desai announced the couple had separated since over a year ago and mutually decided to part ways.

== Filmography ==
=== Films ===
Year	Title	Role	Language	Notes	Ref.
1995	Aazmayish	Unknown	Hindi	Child artist	
2015	The Silence	Tejaswini "Chini"	Marathi		
2019	Sumati	Sumati	Hindi	Short film	
2022	Jeta	Unknown	Marathi		
2022	Roop Nagar Ke Cheetey	Kshipra	Marathi		

=== Television ===
Year	Title	Role	Notes	Ref.
2001	Junior G	Shelly	Child artist	
2006	Solhah Singaarr	Akanksha Bharadwaj		
2006	Kya Mujhse Dosti Karoge	Shweta		
2006–2007	Dharti Ka Veer Yodha Prithviraj Chauhan	Sanyogita	Main female lead	
2008	Dharam Veer	Shera / Rajkumari Ananya		
2009	Mere Ghar Aayi Ek Nanhi Pari	Chandni Chawla	Main female lead	
2009–2011	Sajan Re Jhoot Mat Bolo	Aarti Jhaveri Shah	Main female lead	
2012	Golmaal Hai Bhai Sab Golmaal Hai	Dhwani Dholakia		
2014	Halla Bol	Isha		
2014–2015	Satrangi Sasural	Aarushi Vihaan Vatsal	Main female lead	
2015–2016	Sahib Biwi Aur Boss	Anisha/Manisha Kumar		
2016	Box Cricket League 2	Contestant		
2018	Gulmohar	Kalindi	Marathi series	
2018	Savitri Devi College & Hospital	Mishri Malhotra		
2019–2024	Kumkum Bhagya	Prachi Arora Kohli	Main female lead (Gen 2)	
2021	Bhagya Lakshmi	Prachi Arora Kohli	Special appearance	
2021	Meet: Badlegi Duniya Ki Reet	Prachi Arora Kohli	Special appearance	
2021, 2023	Kundali Bhagya	Prachi Arora Kohli	Special appearance	
2025	Jamai No.1	Herself	Special appearance	

== Awards and nominations ==
Year	Award	Category	Work	Result	Ref.
2007	Best Actress - Popular	Indian Television Academy Awards	Dharti Ka Veer Yodha Prithviraj Chauhan	Nominated	
2015	Maharashtra State Film Awards	Best Actress Debut	The Silence	Won	
2019	Gold Awards	Best Actress in a Supporting Role	Kumkum Bhagya	Won	
2020	Gold Glam and Style Awards	Most Photogenic Star (Female) – TV	Kumkum Bhagya	Won	
2023	Indian Telly Awards	Best Onscreen Couple (with Krishna Kaul)	Kumkum Bhagya	Nominated	
2023	Indian Television Academy Awards	Best Actress – Drama	Kumkum Bhagya	Nominated	

== See also ==
- List of Indian television actresses
- List of Indian film actresses
- List of Hindi television actresses
