= Kill the Rapist? =

Unreleased Bollywood drama-thriller

- Directed by: Sanjay Chhel
- Screenplay by: Sanjay Chhel
- Produced by: Sidharth M Jain
- Starring: Anjali Patil; Sunny Hinduja; Sadiya Siddiqui; Isheta Sarckar
- Distributed by: iRock Media Pvt. Ltd
- Release date: 2018
- Running time: 90 minutes
- Country: India
- Language: Hindi

Kill the Rapist? is a Bollywood drama-thriller film directed by Sanjay Chhel and produced by iRock Media Pvt. Ltd with financial contributions by female private equity investors. The film starring Anjali Patil attempts to amplify the burning issue of Rape in India. The official theatrical trailer of the film was released on 16 December 2013, exactly one year after 2012 Delhi gang rape.

== Plot ==
The film is about a woman (Anjali Patil) who tracks down a serial rapist (Sunny Hinduja) who attempts to make her his latest target. The woman lives with her two female housemates (Sadiya Siddiqui and Isheta Sarckar).

== Cast ==
- Anjali Patil
- Sunny Hinduja
- Sadiya Siddiqui
- Isheta Sarckar

== Production ==
The film doesn't advocate the death penalty for convicted rapists. Instead, the movie is trying to channel widespread outrage at a perceived increase in sexual crimes against women. The film is set in Delhi. Private equity investors Charu Goel from Delhi and a woman identified as Ms Kothari from Mumbai put money into the film. Some scenes of the film have been shot in Madh Island in northern Mumbai. As many as 400 men auditioned to play the part of the rapist, a role that eventually went to Sunny Hinduja.

The production company released a trailer on YouTube giving two telephone numbers to call in, stating that whether the callers voted to kill the rapist or not would determine how the film would end.
