= Rajeev Siddhartha =

Indian actor

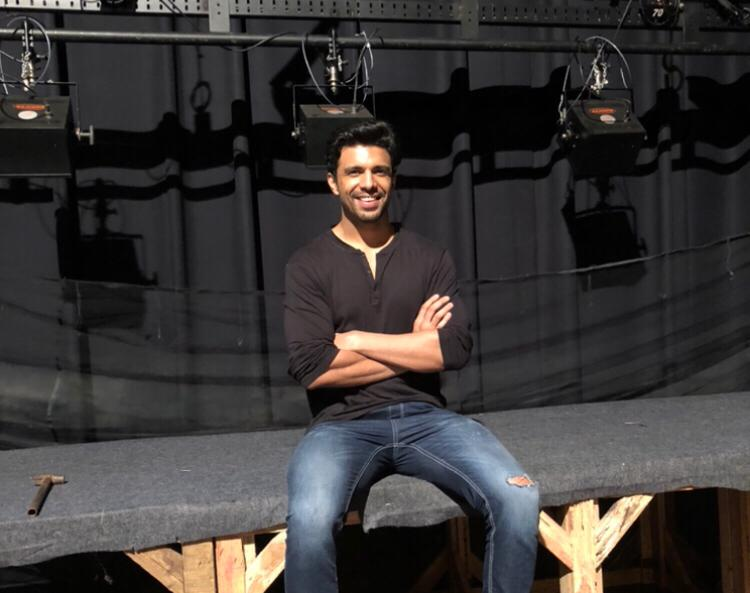
- Siddhartha at the Royal Opera House, Mumbai 2019.
- Born: 11 April 1986 (age 40); Dhanbad, Jharkhand, India
- Education: The Doon School; St. Stephen's College, Delhi
- Occupation: Actor
- Height: 1.83 m (6 ft 0 in)

Rajeev Siddhartha (born 11 April 1986) is an Indian actor / director His work spans productions across film, television, theatre and digital web series. Siddhartha began his career in 2007 with the film Dil Dosti Etc and received critical acclaim as Romil in ALTBalaji's web series show Romil & Jugal in 2017.

== Early life and education ==
Siddhartha was born in Dhanbad, Jharkhand on 11 April 1986. He spent his formative years in boarding schools in Mussoorie and Dehradun. He studied at The Doon School, Dehradun after which he went on to study economics at the honours level from St. Stephen's College, Delhi. He is also an MBA graduate from Narsee Monjee Institute of Management and Higher Studies (NMIMS), Mumbai. After his MBA, Siddhartha worked for a year at an investment bank.

== Career ==
Siddhartha acted in the film Dil Dosti Etc whilst in college. After completing his MBA and working at an investment bank, he took to the Mumbai theatre scene in 2011 with Lillete Dubey's Adhe Adhure. Mumbaitheatreguide.com praised his performance in the play stating, "Rajeev Siddhartha plays the son to perfection, faithfully portraying the repressed angst of the character." Subsequently, he acted in the plays August Osage County, Wedding Album, The Dancing Donkey, Gauhar and The Merchant of Venice. His performance as Bassanio in The Merchant of Venice received mixed responses. His theatre experience has extended to Cineplays (original Hotstar series), namely Adhe Adhure and Vijay Tendulkar's classics Khamosh Adalat Jaari Hai and Kanyadaan.

Simultaneously, he has essayed roles in films and TV shows: he was one of the antagonists in Anil Kapoor's 24 that aired on Colors in 2013. He has also starred in Subhash Kapoor's Jolly LLB featuring Arshad Warsi and Boman Irani. In 2017, Siddhartha played Romil in the ALTBalaji's Romil and Jugal, a same sex love story. Bollywood Life praised both Siddhartha and his co-actor Manraj saying "they prove their calibre as actors". He has subsequently acted in many web series including Four More Shots Please!, Hundred, Aashram, Marzi and the Netflix original film Upstarts.

== Personal life ==
In January 2026, Rajeev Siddhartha confirmed his relationship with actress Kirti Kulhari, his co-star from the web series Four More Shots Please!, after Kulhari shared an Instagram post featuring the two, making their relationship public.

== Filmography ==
Year	Title	Role	Notes
2007	Dil Dosti Etc	Rajesh Solanki	
2013	Jolly LLB	Rahul Dewan	
2013	24	Bala	TV series
2014	Aadhe Adhure	Ashok	
2015	Khamosh Adalat Jaari Hai	Karnik	
2017	Romil & Jugal	Romil Kohli	Web series
2017	Kanyadaan	Jaiprakash	
2018	Kaushiki	Mrityunjay Sharma	Web series
2019–present	Four More Shots Please!	Mihir Shah a.k.a. Mihu Pihu	Web series
2019	Bekaaboo	Kiyan Roy / Gulshan	Web series
2019	Raid	Rhonty Talwar	TV movie
2019	Love	Ishaan	TV movie
2019	Upstarts	Veer	
2020	Marzi	Nitin	Web series
2020	Four More Shots Please!	Mihir Shah	Season 2 of the web series
2020	Hundred	Shantanu	Web series
2020–present	Aashram	Akki (News Reporter)	Web series
2022	A Cheat Day	Chirag	Short film
2024	Badi Heroine Banti Hai	Advait Singhania	Web series
2024	Love, Sitara	Arjun	ZEE5 Film
2024	Honeymoon Photographer	Zubin	JioCinema
2026	Musafir Cafe	Rahil	Netflix
