= Arjun Punj =

Indian television and film actor

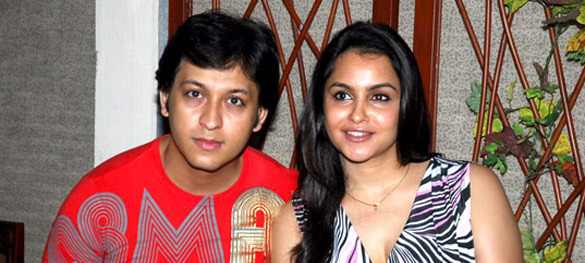
- Arjun with his wife Gurdeep
- Born: New Delhi, India
- Occupation: Actor
- Years active: 2001–present
- Known for: Woh Rehne Waali Mehlon Ki
- Spouse: Gurdeep Kohli (m. 2006)
- Children: 2

Arjun Punj is an Indian television and film actor. Punj is notable for playing the antagonist Dr. Aman in Star TV's long-running television show Sanjivani.

== Filmography ==
Year	Film	Role	Notes
2001	Tere Liye	Aditya Verma	
2002	Joruga Husharuga		Telugu film
2005	Time Pass	Vishal Sharma	
2008	One Two Three	Sonu Narayan	

=== Television ===
Year	Serial	Role
2003	Sanjivani	Dr. Aman
2005	Aahat	Suneel
2005	Woh Rehne Waali Mehlon Ki	Raj Goel
2006	Woh Rehne Waali Mehlon Ki	Prince Thapar
2006–2007	Saathii Re – Saat Kadam... Saat Janam	Prem
2013	Arjun	Inspector Raghu Rajput
2014	Diya Aur Baati Hum	ATS Officer Arjun Chaudhary
2026	Hui Gumm Yaadein Ek Doctor, Do Zindagiyaan	Digvijay
