= Satrangi Sasural =

- Genre: Soap opera
- Based on: Honar Soon Mi Hya Gharchi
- Written by: Purnendu Shekhar
- Directed by: Nandita Mehra
- Starring: Ravish Desai; Mugdha Chaphekar; Vrushika Mehta; Rahul Sharma
- Theme music composer: Sachin–Jigar
- Opening theme: Satrangi Sasural
- Country of origin: India
- Original language: Hindi
- No. of seasons: 3
- No. of episodes: 375

Production
- Producers: Purnendu Shekhar; Bhairavi Raichura; Nandita Mehra
- Camera setup: Multi-camera
- Running time: 22 minutes
- Production company: 24 Frames Media

Original release
- Network: Zee TV
- Release: 3 December 2014 – 26 March 2016

Satrangi Sasural (international title: 7 Bridges to Cross) is a Hindi Indian soap opera, which was broadcast on Zee TV channel from December 2014 to March 2016. it replaced Aur Pyaar Ho Gaya in its timeslot. The show is an adaption of the Zee Marathi series Honar Soon Mi Hya Gharchi. Satrangi Sasural is a story of love and marriage of Vihaan and Aarushi followed the journey of a beautiful middle-class girl Aarushi, who marries into a wealthy family in Delhi that consists of her husband Vihaan Vatsal and her seven mothers-in-law.

The show originally starred Ravish Desai and Mugdha Chaphekar. The show is remembered for its launch and starcast which included actresses who played the seven mothers, with Farida Jalal playing Dadimaa (grandmother) and Desai, Chaphekar who played the lead couple in season 1.

The show saw lead actors of season 1, Ravish and Mugdha tying the knot in 2016 before getting separated in 2024 and eventually divorcing in 2025. The lead actors of marathi version of the show too got married during the course of the series and eventually divorcing a year later.

== Plot ==
=== Season one ===
Wealthy Vihaan Vatsal meets and falls in love with middle-class Aarushi, and brings her home to his seven "mothers" led by matriarch Dadi Maa. Aarushi sees through their tough exteriors and meets their demanding expectations while also forming a close bond with each of them.

Bua maa strikes Vibha with her car and Aarushi takes responsibility. Vibha's abusive husband demands a huge compensation but Vibha proclaims Aarushi's innocence and the family hire her as their house helper. However, Vibha forms an unhealthy attachment to Vihaan and burns the couple's passports to sabotage their honeymoon. The couple instead go to Mumbai where Vihaan proposed, and Vihaan disappears after being attacked by goons. Months later, on the day of Aarushi's baby shower, Vihaan returns with his "wife" Vibha. Vihaan had lost his memory and Vibha convinced him that she was his wife and Aarushi their maid. Threatening to turn Vihaan against them, Vibha makes the family follow her orders. Vihaan gradually becomes closer to Aarushi, especially when she gives birth to twins, a boy and a girl, but is confused by his feelings. He slowly regains his memories when Vibha tries to take him away from his family.

Vibha sells the family house, but realizes the buyer is Vihaan in disguise. Vibha gives Vihaan a poisoned kiss and demands that he legally marry her for the antidote. They are about to be married when Aarushi gives him the antidote instead. Vibha then takes their daughter hostage, blackmails the family, and burns their house. The family eventually reclaim the child. Aarushi stabs Vibha who shoots her, and Aarushi dies.

=== Season two ===
Eight years later, a new girl, Kaira decides to marry Vihaan so she can receive her inheritance. They agree to separate after three months, a scheme by Bebo who is after the money. Although three of Vihaan's mothers despise her, Kaira grows close to the family. Kaira rescues Vihaan from Bebo's schemes, and Bebo dies while trying to control him with black magic.

Aarushi's long-lost sister Millie joins the family. Kaira tries to expose her as a witch but Millie's black magic stops her. The mothers convince the couple to marry properly but Millie causes misunderstandings. On the wedding day, Millie goes in Kaira's place but Kaira completes the ceremony. The mothers supporting Millie insist that she is also Vihaan's wife since he half-married her. Suspecting Millie is a witch, Kaira and Vihaan pursue her, and Vihaan vanishes. When Vihaan returns, he is rude to Kaira who believes he is an impostor. Kaira rescues the real Vihaan and Millie apologises. Kaira understands that Millie was forced in her actions, but Millie cannot identify who is responsible.

Dadi Maa overhears rumours that Kaira became pregnant by the impostor, offending Kaira who stays with Vasundhara. Vihaan sees a jewel at Vasundhara's home which he remembers from when he was under a spell. Dadi Maa performs a ritual to safeguard the family, but forgot the book in which Vihaan's fate was written. When she finds the book, Vihaan's secret fate had been torn out. The secret is that Vihaan's mother is actually Veena, Dadi Maa's eldest daughter-in-law who was banished for using black magic. Vihaan learns that Vasundhara, who also identifies as Veena and Mayavinni; regains her powers each month from the jewel. When the jewel glows in his hands he realizes that he is the witch's son. Vihaan meets Vasundhara in the forest and destroys the jewel, and she fatally attacks him. Kaira swears revenge.

=== Season three ===
One month after Vihaan's death, the family is celebrating Father's Day. Kaira provides gifts for the twins, making excuses for Vihaan's absence. Meanwhile, Vasundhara has lost her powers and realised that she killed her own son, and renews her determination to destroy all the Vatsals.

Kaira begins the traditional widow's grieving that Dadi Maa insisted upon, but later realizes that Dadi Maa is under Vasundhara's spell. Dadi Maa brings Vasundhara and her paralysed husband, Vihaan's father, into the home, against the wishes of Kaira and the other mothers. While causing a conflict, Vasundhara receives an electric shock and dies.

Meanwhile, the new neighbour, Bharat Bhusan Chautala, a.k.a. BBC, expresses a romantic interest in Kaira. It is revealed that he is the long-lost son of Vihaan's adoptive mother, and heir of the Vastals. In the end, he proposes to Kaira who accepts.

== Cast ==
=== Season one ===
- Ravish Desai as Vihaan Vatsal
- Mugdha Chaphekar as Aarushi Vihaan Vatsal. Aarushi dies in the last episode of season one
- Farida Jalal as Gomti Vatsal / Dadi Maa
- Samta Sagar as Geeta Vatsal
- Bhavana Balsavar as Harpreet Vatsal
- Sadiya Siddiqui as Priyanka Vatsal
- Resham Tipnis as Babita Vatsal
- Sonali Sachdev as Narmada Vatsal
- Shital Thakkar as Neelima Tripathi
- Simpy Singh as Vibha Arvind Yadav / Vibha Vihaan Vatsal
- Pulkit Bangia as Girish Pandit
- Sheikh Sami as Govind Pandit
- Kanchan Gupta as Kasturi Pandit
- Govind Pandey as Prahlaad Pandit
- Tanvi Sawant as Millie Paandit
- Alefia Kapadia as Karuna
- Rakesh Kukreti as Gautam Tripathi
- Rituraj Singh as Rajesh Vatsal
- Parveen Kaur as Diya's Mother
- Farhan Siddiqui as Raunak Punjabi

=== Season two ===
- Ravish Desai as Vihaan Vatsal, he dies in the last episode of season two
- Vrushika Mehta as Kaira Vihaan Vatsal
- Farida Jalal as Gomti Vatsal / Dadi Maa
- Bhavana Balsavar as Harpreet Vatsal
- Sadiya Siddiqui as Priyanka Vatsal
- Resham Tipnis as Babita Vatsal
- Sonali Sachdev as Narmada Vatsal
- Shital Thakkar as Neelima Tripathi
- Divyangana Jain as Millie Pandit
- Maninee De as Vasundhara/Mayavini
- Vishavpreet Kaur as Bebo
- Yajuvendra Singh as Chetan Singh
- Susheel Parashar as Yashwant Singh

=== Season three ===
- Rahul Sharma as Bharat Bhushan Chautala
- Vrushika Mehta as Kaira Bharat Bhushan Chautala
- Manini Mishra as Vasundhara/Mayavini
- Farida Jalal as Gomti Vatsal / Dadi Maa
- Bhavana Balsavar as Harpreet Vatsal / Chachi Maa
- Sadiya Siddiqui as Priyanka Vatsal / Bua Maa
- Resham Tipnis as Babita Vatsal / Mini Maa
- Sonali Sachdev as Narmada Vatsal/maa
- Shital Thakkar as Neelima Tripathi / Massi Maa
- Samta Sagar as Geeta Vatsal / Tai Maa

== Awards and nominations ==
Year	Award	Category	Nominee	Result
2014	Zee Rishtey Awards	Favourite Naya Sadasya - Male	Ravish Desai	Won
2014	Zee Rishtey Awards	Favourite Naya Sadasya - Female	Mugdha Chaphekar	Won
2014	Zee Rishtey Awards	Favourite Beta	Ravish Desai	Nominated
2014	Zee Rishtey Awards	Favourite Behen	Mugdha Chaphekar	Nominated
2014	Zee Rishtey Awards	Favourite Bhai	Pulkit Bangia	Nominated
2014	Zee Rishtey Awards	Favourite Dosti	Ravish Desai	Nominated
2015	Zee Rishtey Awards	Favourite Buzurg	Farida Jalal	Won
2015	Zee Rishtey Awards	Favourite Beta	Ravish Desai	Nominated
2015	Zee Rishtey Awards	Favourite Bahu	Vrushika Mehta	Nominated
2015	Zee Rishtey Awards	Favourite Saas-Bahu Rishta	Vrushika Mehta, Farida Jalal, Sadiya Siddiqui, Resham Tipnis	Nominated
2015	Zee Rishtey Awards	Favourite Nayi Jodi	Ravish Desai and Vrushika Mehta	Nominated

== Adaptations ==
Language	Title	Original release	Network(s)	Last aired	Notes
Marathi	Honar Soon Mi Hya Gharchi होणार सून मी ह्या घरची	15 July 2013	Zee Marathi	24 January 2016	Original
Telugu	Neneu Aayana Aruguru Athalalu నేనేయు ఆయన అరుగు అథళాలు	24 February 2014	Zee Telugu	27 September 2014	Remake
Kannada	Shrirasthu Shubhamasthu ಶ್ರೀರಸ್ತು ಶುಭಮಸ್ತು	22 September 2014	Zee Kannada	2 July 2016	Remake
Hindi	Satrangi Sasural सतरंगी ससुराल	3 December 2014	Zee TV	26 March 2016	Remake
