= Dil Dosti Dance =

Indian dance based youth show

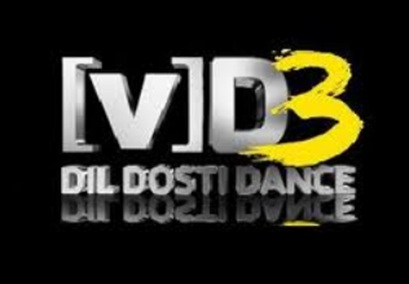
- Also known as: D3 : Dil Dostii Dance
- Genre: Teen drama
- Created by: Palki Malhotra
- Written by: Palki Malhotra
- Screenplay by: Palki Malhotra; Priya Ramanathan
- Story by: Palki Malhotra; Priya Ramanathan; Apeksha; Preeti
- Directed by: Vikram V. Labhe; Sunith Pillai; Anirudhh Rajderkar; Rajeev Raj; Hemant N Mishra
- Creative directors: Palki Malhotra; Ameeta Devadigga
- Starring: Shakti Mohan; Kunwar Amar; Shantanu Maheshwari; Sneha Kapoor; Vrushika Mehta; Vrinda Dawda; Sumedh Mudgalkar
- Theme music composer: Pritam
- Opening theme: Dil Dosti Dance theme song by Neeti Mohan
- Composer: Abhijeet Hegdepatil KK
- Country of origin: India
- Original language: Hindi
- No. of seasons: 1
- No. of episodes: 857

Production
- Producers: Prem Kishan; Sunil Mehta)
- Running time: 19–22 minutes
- Production company: Cinevistaas Ltd.

Original release
- Network: Channel V India
- Release: 11 April 2011 – 9 January 2015

D3: Dil Dosti Dance (Love, Friendship, Dance) is an Indian television series that premiered on Channel V on 11 April 2011. It is the first dance-based fiction show on Indian television and the longest-running youth-based show, spanning four years and 857 episodes.

It focuses about the journey of friendship, love and dance by the students of St. Louis College . It stars Kunwar Amar, Shantanu Maheshwari, Sneha Kapoor, Shakti Mohan, Vrushika Mehta and Vrinda Dawda in lead roles. The show won accolades such as the Indian Telly Awards for Best Youth Show – Fiction, Best New Talent, Jury Award for Best Choreographer, and Indian Television Academy Award for On-Screen Couple of the Year to Shantanu Maheshwari and Vrushika Mehta.

== Plot ==
Kria moves to Mumbai with her mother to study at St. Louis College. She starts a war with college General Secretary Reyansh "Rey" Singhania when they end up in jail after a dance battle at a party and becomes Cultural Secretary Sharon Rai Prakash's enemy. Kria discovers that the college has a dance group: the Dazzlers/Dazzlings. In the first few days of college, Kria is bullied by the Dazzlers except Rey. During the footloose audition, she meets Swayam Shekhawat. Swayam has a massive crush on Sharon but is insulted by her since he is a Weakling. Infuriated by this, Kria and a few others form a dance group called the Weaklings, who challenge the Dazzlers in a footloose. The Dazzlers consist of Rey, Sharon, Vicky, Nil, Simmi and Rinni and Weaklings consist of Kria, Swayam, Neha, Bharath, Amar and Vishaka.

Sharon despises the Weaklings, especially Kria, and is irked by her growing friendship with Rey. During Rose Day, she creates a big misunderstanding between the two, which causes Kria to slap Rey. Rey starts hating Kria after the incident, and they pull pranks to demoralise each other. Kria becomes uncomfortable seeing Rey and Sharon dance together on Rose Day, while Swayam cheats and makes Kria the Rose Queen. To make up for this, he sends gifts to Sharon as a secret admirer. Sharon becomes overjoyed on seeing gifts from her admirer and desperately wants to find out his identity.

Professor Karan Malik enters St. Louis College and tries to create peace between the two groups through various tasks and activities, and is mostly successful until the confession task. During this task, Sharon dislikes Swayam even more when he confesses that Sharon was the actual Rose Queen, but he cheated and made Kria win instead. Rey and Kria apologise to each other, but a significant rift is caused in Rey and Sharon's friendship when she confesses that she created the misunderstandings between Rey and Kria, causing him to yell at her and leave. Professor Karan realizes the damage the task has caused when he finds Sharon crying. Rey befriends Kria and starts avoiding Sharon. Professor Malik tries to stop their fight and make both of them reconcile, but Sharon avoids him. Sharon and Rey, as well as both teams, reconcile. Professor Malik leaves St. Louis and is replaced by Ms. Nicole. Meanwhile, St. Louis organizes a dance festival where Kria realizes she likes Rey. Rey and Kria decide to bring Swayam and Sharon together. Sharon discovers her secret admirer's identity, and rejects Swayam's feelings towards her. Swayam is shattered after Sharon's rejection and is depressed. As Rey and Kriya try to find out who is the "secret admirer" they come closer to each other and now they have fallen for each other, just like Swayam and Sharon. The story thus focuses on Kriya and Rey, Sharon and Swayam and the other characters as their Dil experiences the tremors of first love, Dosti develops when new friendships are established and Dance which has always been their passion. Oflate, all the friends are being divided again into "dazzlers" and "weaklings" due to the upcoming "footloose elimination" and this is bringing distance between Rey and Kriya, Swayam and Sharon, and Vicky and Neha.

Later on Kria's mother finds out that Kria and Rey are in a relationship so she takes Kria away from Mumbai. Rey is left alone Heartbroken. However Kria performs at the footloose. Shivam tries to befriend Sharon and he steals the Dazzlers' finale performance. This leads to the Dazzlers to get disqualified. The Weaklings are qualified for the finals alon with KR college.

The Dazzler's humiliation at Footloose leaves Sharon completely shattered and underconfident. It is at this time that Swayam decides help her come out of her shell again. He does end up doing so, by silently supporting her throughout. Though she never acknowledges it, Sharon does have feelings for Swayam. After the gang's return from Goa, where Sharon renewed her confidence, Taani enters. Taani is Swayam's sister and is in love with Rey, a feeling so strong that it compels her come from Jodpur to Mumbai. Despite initial resistance, she ends up becoming a part of the gang. After Kria's departure, the Weaklings are busy looking for a 6th dancer, which is why Taani pretends to be a good dancer to get into the team, which creates havoc when the truth unfolds. Meanwhile, Shivam enters their college once again and tries to break the team. At this time, Sharon and Swayam are getting closer to each other. Swayam finally musters up the courage to ask Sharon out which she refuses. But she finally accepts her love for Swayam and expresses it, commencing their "trial relationship". Shivam quickly befriends Taani, and uses her to manipulates things against the D3 gang. Taani and he pretend to be a couple, which gets Rey jealous. Sharon and Swayam decide to keep their relationship a secret. Thanks to Shivam, the Dazzlers manage to get back into Footloose. But Shivam ends up creating trouble between the two teams by raising the topic of the Weakings team falling short of a dancer. When Sharon is unable to keep up her word of letting the team in because of Shivam's tactics, the Weaklings blame the Dazzlers for their defeat and the latter's win. However, the anger boils down after a while, and the gang unites, though it ends up breaking the Vicky-Neha relationship. Vishakha leaves the college soon after.

It is during the Dance Camp that Sharon ends up fainting while dancing and is taken to Delhi. The Dance Camp ends up breaking the confidence of the gang, as only Swayam, Neha and Rey win titles. Taani and Rey end up getting closer while Swayam continues to maintain a long-distance relationship with his girlfriend, Sharon. The gang ends up meeting Aashi, a fellow college student who always wanted to be a part of the Weaklings team. Aashi has a tiny crush on Swayam which ends up in the gang constantly teasing them together, against Swayam's wishes. Taani and Rey become closer to each other. Thanks to the efforts taken by the Assistant Vice Principal, Khushboo, the gang feels discouraged while dancing and everyone quits the team, except Swayam, Rey, Nilesh and Aashi. After a while, Sharon stops responding to Swayam's calls and messages which worries him. During this time, Taani and Rey continuously bicker and argue about their relationship and GS-AGS and the personal equation. When Sharon finally returns from Delhi, she behaves coldly with him before announcing that she doesn't want to be in a relationship with Swayam anymore. The reason behind this is that Sharon has asthma, which will stop her from dancing. Sharon knows how much Swayam loves dancing and doesn't want him to quit for her sake. Swayam is shattered but still tries to find out Sharon's reasons. Sharon keeps the asthma a secret from everyone, except her best friend, Simmi. At this time, Taani and Rey also confess their feelings for one another and become a couple.

Sharon tells the gang that she won't be a part of the dance team anymore. She refuses to help the team prepare for the dance at Indiafest, though it ends up with Swayam and her sharing a passionate dance. At Indiafest, the entire gang arrives unexpectedly, after having decided that they will continue dancing. Everyone, including Sharon, performs at Indiafest together which attracts a viewer who offers them money to perform together. This leads the team to form their own group, D3. Sharon ends up revealing about her asthma problem to Swayam which leads to an emotional break up. In spite of that, Swayam silently continues to take care of her which manages to get them closer to each other, though as friends. The D3 gang begins to perform at various events while preparing for the Nation Dance Championship(NDC) as well. At this time, Swayam's father, Rishi Shekhawat enters. He hates Swayam's passion for dance and keeps putting him down. Unaware of Rey's dancing talent, he constantly pits Rey against Swayam, ending to Swayam becoming extremely angry and annoyed. Rey realises that Taani is becoming far too dependent on him and Swayam and breaks up with her, hoping she will be able to become more independent. Sharon also realises she has undeniable feelings for Swayam and gets closer to him, leaving him confused about where their relationship stands. The D3 team goes on progressing from one NDC level to another. They are eliminated during one level, which Swayam feels is because of the injury he had sustained. Later, they realise it was because of a biased judge who is removed because of Taani's efforts and the team's disqualification is taken back. Swayam tries to stay away from Sharon to prevent himself from being hurt. But eventually, Sharon ends up indirectly confessing her feelings for him by telling his father. This leads to Swayam and Sharon proposing their feelings to each other finally and them becoming a couple, which they decide to keep a secret. Rey tells Taani the reason for their break up but Taani decides to end the relationship for good and move on. On the day of the finals of NDC, thanks to Sharon, Rishi ends up making up with his son. The team wins the competition with Rey winning special award for best solo dancer and Swayam wins the award for the best choreographer. Post this, Sharon and Swayam end up going on their first date. Soon after, Taani tells everyone she is leaving the college. Rey was left heartbroken. But his friends help him try to forget and move on. Then a new character Named Aditya enters the show who tries to create problems between the team and friends because he only wanted to cast Rey for his show, but As he knew that Rey would never agree to do anything without his team or friends ! So Aditya plans and tries to break the team !

== Cast ==
=== Main ===
- Kunwar Amar as Reyansh "Rey" Singhania, Kria's boyfriend, Taani's ex-boyfriend, Swayam and Sharon's best friend, Sara's love interest (Main Lead)
- Shantanu Maheshwari as Swayam Shekhawat, Sharon's boyfriend, Rey and Kria's best friend, Taani's cousin, Aashi's crush (Main Lead)
- Shakti Mohan as Kria Ghai, Rey's girlfriend, Swayam's best friend (Main Lead)
- Sneha Kapoor/Vrushika Mehta as Sharon Rai Prakash, Swayam's girlfriend, Rey and Simmi's best friend (Main Lead)
- Vrinda Dawda as Taani Shekhawat, Swayam's cousin, Rey's ex-girlfriend, Vishesh's fiancée (Parallel Lead)
- Archi Pratik as Vikramjeet "Vicky" Kalsi, Neha's boyfriend
- Alisha Singh as Neha Kapoor, Vicky's girlfriend
- Macedon D'mello as Nilesh "Nil" Kotian, Simmi's boyfriend
- Samentha Fernandes as Simmi Malhotra, Nil's girlfriend, Sharon's best friend
- Amar Gowda as Amar Kalra
- Priyanka Soni as Rinni Shah
- Bharat Ragathi as Bharat Ragathi
- Vinti Idnani as Vishakha
- Sneha Gupta as Aashi

=== Recurring ===
- Tarana Raja as Smriti Ghai, Kriya's mother.
- Abir Goswami as Gautam Rai Prakash, Sharon’s father. (Uncredited)
- Anirudh Deo as Ravi Dixit (RDX)
- Karan Singh Grover as Professor Karan Malik
- Vallary Lokre as Miss Nicole.
- Khushboo Grewal as AVP Khushboo Meerchandani
- Jiten Lalwani as Rishi Shekhawat, Swayam's father and Taani's uncle
- Sehban Azim as Aditya Khurana
- Suchit Vikram Singh as Vishesh, Taani's childhood friend & fiancé.
- Mihir Mishra as Ranvijay Singhania, Rey's father
- Kartik Bishnoi as Jignesh Desai, Rinni's fiancé.
- Raymon Kakar as Avantika Rai Prakash, Sharon's mother
- Lavin Gothi as Shivam Dutta, GS of KR college
- Sumedh Mudgalkar as Raghav/Raghavendra Pratap Singh
- Jason Tham as Karma Wangchuk
- Pratibha Paul as Ishika Chakraborty
- Anusua Chowdhury as Huma Ali
- Sonal Vengurlekar as Ruhi Sonkari, obsessed with Swayam
- Mohena Singh as Sara, Sharon's cousin
- Shruti Prakash as Kavita, Swayam's date
- Bhavin Bhanushali as Teelu, Swayam's cousin, Sharon's stalker

== Release and reception ==
The show was first aired on 11 April 2011.

The show gained a cult following and was branded as the "turning point of youth television" by various media portals.

The romantic pairings of Rey–Kria and Swayam–Sharon were praised for their chemistry. Also the pairing of Rey-Taani enjoyed a loyal fan following. The show was also praised for its portrayal of friendship and dance. The characters, as well as the actors, became popular, with the show experimenting widely in various dance forms and storylines.

Mumbai Mirror praised the show, saying "it changed the outlook towards modern-day youth shows as it created a niche of its own".

TV portal Tellychakkar wrote that "the characters not only enjoyed unparalleled success on the show but also become the benchmark for other youth-based shows. From choreographed sequences to impromptu splits, the show had beautiful moves that made us want to dance too."

Bollywood Helpline said "the TV industry has witnessed many dance-based reality shows over the years, but reality shows have a definite life to them. Especially in such a cut-throat competition scenario where shows do not last for more than 6 months or a year, completing 4 years successfully is something to be proud of. We are talking about none other than the favourite show of today's youth Dil Dosti Dance, which is first its kind dance based fiction show."

The show had a special performance by Moulin Rouge! cast members who came from Paris.

Shakti Mohan, playing the character of Kria quit the show after 175 episodes and her character was shown shifting to abroad . However she returned in 2014 .

Vrinda Dawda was selected to play the role of Rey's new love interest (Taani) after Kria shifted abroad. Vrinda quit the show in 2014 where her character was shown getting engaged to her childhood friend

Sneha Kapoor portraying Sharon quit D3 in 2012 and was replaced by Vrushika Mehta.

In 2014 Kunwar Amar took break from the show and returned after a month

In 2014 four new characters Raghav, Karma, Ishita and Huma were introduced as the juniors

On 9 January 2015 the show ended with the completion of 857 episodes. The show is supposedly the most successful fictional youth show on small screen.

== Awards ==
Year	Award	Category	Nominee(s)	Result
2011	Indian Telly Awards	Best New Talent	Dil Dosti Dance	Won
2012	Indian Telly Awards	Best Youth Show- Fiction	Dil Dosti Dance	Won
2012	Gold Awards	Best Debut Actor	Kunwar Amar	Nominated
2013	Indian Telly Awards	Jury Award for Best Choreographer	Sumit- Vinod (for Kambakht Ishq)	Won
2013	Indian Telly Awards	Jury Award for Best Choreographer	Nimit Kotian	Nominated
2013	Indian Telly Awards	Best Youth Show- Fiction	Dil Dosti Dance	Nominated
2014	Indian Television Academy Award	GR8 On Screen Couple (Viewers Choice Awards)	Shantanu Maheshwari and Vrushika Mehta	Won
2014	Indian Telly Awards	Indian Telly Jury Award for Best Choreographer	Shantanu Maheshwari & Macedon D'Mello (for Alvida)	Nominated
2014	Indian Telly Awards	Indian Telly Jury Award for Best Choreographer	Ankita Maity	Won
