= Sanjivani (2019 TV series) =

Indian medical drama television series (2019-2020)

- Genre: Medical drama
- Directed by: Abhijit Das; Jackson Sethi
- Starring: Surbhi Chandna; Namit Khanna; Mohnish Bahl; Gurdeep Kohli; Gaurav Chopra; Sayantani Ghosh
- Country of origin: India
- Original language: Hindi
- No. of seasons: 1
- No. of episodes: 155

Production
- Producer: Siddharth P. Malhotra
- Running time: 22 minutes
- Production company: Alchemy Films Private Limited

Original release
- Network: Star Plus
- Release: 12 August 2019 – 13 March 2020

Related
- Sanjivani (2002 TV series)

Sanjivani (international title: The Frontliners) is an Indian medical drama television series which aired from 12 August 2019 to 13 March 2020 on the Star Plus channel. Produced by Alchemy Films, it starred Surbhi Chandna, Namit Khanna, Mohnish Bahl, Gurdeep Kohli and Gaurav Chopra. Sanjivani is a rebooted version of the 2002 series of the same name.

It follows the lives of Dr. Ishani Arora and Dr. Siddhant "Sid" Mathur, who have opposing personalities, yet struggle with attraction to each other as they navigate the difficulties of their lives and careers at Sanjivani Hospital.

== Plot ==
Dr. Ishani Arora is devout, ethically minded, and responsible. Dr. Siddhant "Sid" Mathur is carefree, flirty, and focused on getting the job done. Unable to understand each other, the two start off disliking each other. As Ishani and Sid work together, a friendship sparks between them. Misunderstandings occasionally divide the two, but they find resolution. Slowly the two develop feelings for each other, and eventually confess their feelings. Meanwhile, Dr. Asha Kanwar gets pregnant with Dr. Aman Gehlot's child out of wedlock. Unable to handle the situation, Dr. Aman runs away. Sid fakes being married to Dr. Asha to protect her unborn child. Ishani is left heartbroken, but later learns the truth. Under Vardhan Makhija's instructions, Asha plots to keep Sid and Ishani separated, since Vardhan wants to use Sid to get revenge on Dr. Shashank Gupta. Ishani, with the help of Dr. Rahil Shekhar, investigates the matter and tries to warn Sid about Asha and her intentions. Initially Sid does not believe her but eventually learns the truth. A furious Sid exposes Asha in front of the staff of Sanjivani. Ishani is shot protecting Asha and her unborn child. She undergoes surgery but slips into a coma. Guilty, Asha accepts her misdeeds, backs out of Vardhan's plans and seeks forgiveness.

=== After a few days ===
Ishani recovers. Dr. Shashank dies in a car accident, leaving the Sanjivani staff distraught. Sid learns that Shashank was his father. Ishani and Sid expose Vardhan, and he is arrested. Ishani and Sid decide to marry, but Sid is blackmailed by Ishani's relatives to stay away from her. When Sid does not arrive at the mandapa, Ishani is left devastated. Sanjivani Hospital is shut down.

=== Three years later ===
Navratan Singh buys Sanjivani Hospital and reopens it. Ishani is dejected, but Navratan motivates Ishani to give life a second chance. Ishani sees Sid in a comatose condition, reminding her of her past and bringing back her feelings of sadness. Sid regains his consciousness but has partially lost his memory, but Ishani operates on him and he recalls everything. Sid exposes Ishani's relatives and reveals why he had not arrived to marry her and Ishani is left shocked. Navratan marries Ishani and Sid and the show ends.

== Cast ==
=== Main ===
- Surbhi Chandna as Dr. Ishani Arora Mathur: A neurosurgeon; Sid's wife (2019–2020)
- Namit Khanna as Dr. Siddhant "Sid" Mathur: A neurosurgeon; Roshni and Shashank's son, Anjali's half-brother; Ishani's husband (2019–2020)
- Mohnish Bahl as Dr. Shashank Gupta: The CEO of Sanjivani and a neurosurgeon; Anjali and Sid's father (2019–2020)
- Gurdeep Kohli as Dr. Juhi Singh: A neurosurgeon and the chief of surgery (2019–2020)
- Gaurav Chopra as Navratan Singh: The CEO of Sanjivani (2020)

=== Recurring ===
- Sayantani Ghosh as Dr. Anjali Gupta: The HOD of Obstetrics and a gynaecology; Shashank's daughter; Sid's half sister (2019–2020) Anjali was previously portrayed by Sunaina Gulia in the series Dill Mill Gayye.
- Rohit Roy as Vardhan Makhija; The chief financial officer (2019–2020)
- Rashmi Singh as Dr. Asha Kanwar (2019)
- Chandni Bhagwanani as Dr. Asha Kanwar (2019)
- Jason Tham as Dr. Neil Lama Lau (2019–2020)
- Robin Sohi as Dr. Aman Gehlot (2019)
- Kunal Bhan as Dr. Rahil Shekhar; Siddhant's best friend (2019–2020)
- Rahul Choudhry as Dr. Rishabh Vaidya (2019–2020)
- Ekta Sohini as Roshni Mathur; Shashank's ex-love and Sid's mother (2019)
- Seema Pandey/Ekta Sohni as Roshni Mathur (2020)
- Sameer Khakhar as Guddu Mathur; Roshni's brother; Sid's uncle (2019–2020)
- Khushbu Thakkar as Anisha Singh; Navratan's sister (2020)
- Sulakshana Khatri as Bebe; Navratan and Anisha's grandmother (2020)
- Sheela Sharma as Nurse Philo (2019–2020)
- Ahmad Harhash as Dr. Neil Kapoor (2019)

== Adaptations ==
Language	Title	Original release	Network(s)	Last aired	Notes
Bengali	Ekhane Aakash Neel এখানে আকাশ নীল	23 September 2019	Star Jalsha	3 October 2020	Remake

== Production ==
=== Development ===
Sanjivani is a reboot of the 2002 series of the same name, but follows the lives of resident doctors Ishani Arora and Sid Mathur at Sanjivani Hospital. Mohnish Bahl and Gurdeep Kohli reprise their roles of Dr. Shashank Gupta and Dr. Juhi Singh.

The plan for the reboot was announced by producer Siddharth P. Malhotra in April 2019 and was confirmed in June 2019. The first look of the series was released on National Doctors' Day on 1 July 2019.

In September 2019, Mohnish Bahl's wife Ekta Sohini joined the cast as his onscreen wife Roshni Mathur. She later quit, as the subplot between the two was dropped, and Seema Pandey was cast for the role. In January 2020, Mohnish Bahl also quit, stating he was unable to justify his role.

The series was supposed to wrap on 17 January 2020 due to low viewership, but received an extension of three months. A three-year leap was introduced in January 2020, and Gaurav Chopra was cast as Navratan Singh.

The shooting of the series was completed on 6 March 2020.

=== Filming ===
Sanjivani was filmed in Mumbai, India. The set was a fake forty-four floored hospital named Sanjivani, consisting of two wings.

=== Actor training ===
Playing a doctor is truly a challenging task. It's not easy on any level but it does help when you have proper guidance from the real experts. For Sanjivani, we have real doctors visiting the sets and helping us in terms of body language, basic medical terms and things like how a doctor wears gloves, checks the blood pressure of a patient and the right way to hold a stethoscope. We will be showcasing different medical cases along with the dramatic element on the show. I would like to express my profound gratitude to all the medical experts who have helped us to better our performances in Sanjivani.

— Surbhi Chandna

I watched four or five seasons of Grey's Anatomy. It gave me the visual understanding of the insides of the hospital. Sanjivani and Grey's are different shows. I was looking for body language while doing the surgery. I was not for looking something to copy but it took me to their world. Apart from Grey's I also watched The Residents. There were a few things that were good to see, which will remain in my subconscious mind to implement at some time.

— Namit Khanna

== Reception ==
Sanjifani had a positive reception. The Times of India said, "Sanjivani has a fresh feel, stylish look and quite a colourful touch." Comparing the previous version, they said, "We love the fresh take and the colourful palette this season. The very feel of the hospital is very modern compared to previous season's minimalistic look of the doctors and has been made keeping in mind the latest trends." The Quint noted that it is high on drama and style and stated, "The star-studded cast and the nostalgia factor are the driving force for this show at the outset. Surbhi and Namit's love-hate relationship will surely be the key interest point for the viewers going forward. The show feels high on style and swaps charm for impact. The writing is full of broad strokes, especially in terms of characterization."
