= Roop Nagar Ke Cheetey =

- Theatrical release poster
- Directed by: Vihan Suryavanshi
- Written by: Vihan Suryavanshi; Kartik Krishnan
- Screenplay by: Vihan Suryavanshi & Kartik Krishnan
- Produced by: Mannan Shaah
- Starring: Karan Parab; Kunal Shukla; Aayushi Bhave; Sana Prabhu; Mugdha Chaphekar; Hemal Ingle; Ajit Pawar
- Cinematography: Santosh Reddy
- Edited by: Gorakshnath Khande
- Music by: Mujeeb Majeed
- Production company: ACE Entertainment
- Distributed by: AA Films
- Release date: 16 September 2022
- Running time: 169 minutes
- Country: India
- Language: Marathi
- Box office: est.₹3.72 crore

Roop Nagar Ke Cheetey is an Indian Marathi language drama film directed by Vihan Suryavanshi and produced by Mannan Shaah under the banner of ACE Entertainment. The film stars Karan Parab, Kunal Shukla, Aayushi Bhave, Sana Prabhu, Mugdha Chaphekar and Hemal Ingle. The film was released on 16 September 2022.

== Synopsis ==
It depicts the journey of two childhood friends and their contrasting lives in two different cities after an incident. It presents some neglected aspects of friendship that have never been explored before.

== Cast ==
- Karan Parab as Akhil
- Kunal Shukla as Girish
- Hemal Ingle as Devika
- Aayushi Bhave as Maya
- Mugdha Chaphekar as Kshipra
- Sana Prabhu as Rati
- Akshay Kelkar as Sarang
- Saorabh Rajnish Choughule as Jagan
- Onkar Bhojane as Professor
- Rajit Kapur as Jatin
- Tanvika Parlikar as Smita
- Ajit Pawar

== Production and marketing ==
A news report published by The Indian Express in December 2013 suggests that the film was announced back in 2013. The film's title is derived from a popular dialogue, 'Hum Roop Nagar Ke Cheetey Hain, Shikaar Par Hi Jeete Hain', of a 1990s Bollywood movie. It was announced as a Marathi-language film by its producer Mannan Shaah by sharing the film's motion poster on Instagram in January 2021. The shooting of the film was started in February 2021. The film was also shot in Pune, Maharashtra and Bangalore, Karnataka.

The first teaser of the film was released on YouTube in July 2022. The film's trailer was released on 2 September 2022, in YouTube. It is released on 16 September 2022.

== Soundtrack ==
Roop Nagar Ke Cheetey

Soundtrack album by Mannan Shaah Shaan Rahman
- Released: 2022
- Genre: Feature film soundtrack
- Length: 22:40
- Language: Marathi
- Label: Zee Music Company
- Producer: Mannan Shaah

The film score is composed by Mujeeb Majeed while the songs featured in the film are composed by Mannan Shaah and Shaan Rahman, lyrics by Jai Atre and songs sung by Adarsh Shinde, Saurabh Salunke, Gowry Lekshmi, Narayani Gopan, Shaan Rahman and Sunidhi Chauhan.

Track listing
No.	Title	Lyrics	Singer(s)	Length
1.	"Houn Jau De"	Jai Atre	Adarsh Shinde, Saurabh Salunke	5:04
2.	"Mudda Asa"	Jai Atre	Gowry Lekshmi, Narayani Gopan	4:20
3.	"Takladu"	Jai Atre	Narayani Gopan	4:01
4.	"Thambli Kashi Kahani"	Jai Atre	Sunidhi Chauhan	3:51
5.	"Houn Zaau De (reprise version)"	Jai Atre	Adarsh Shinde	5:08
Total length:				22:40

== Reception ==
=== Critical reception ===
Sanjay Ghavare of Marathi newspaper Lokmat praises the performance of actors, cinematography and eye-catching locations of the film. The film's writing and direction were also praised. Anub George of The Times of India gave it 3.5 out of 5 stars, calling the film ‘surprises you with its nuanced approach toward storytelling.’ The film was rated 2.5 out of 5 by Jaydeep Pathakji, a film critic who writes for newspaper Maharashtra Times.
