= Ashi Hi Aashiqui =

- Official release poster
- Directed by: Sachin Pilgaonkar
- Written by: Sachin Pilgaonkar
- Produced by: Bhushan Kumar; Krishan Kumar; Vajir Singh; Joe Rajan; Supriya Pilgaonkar
- Starring: Abhinay Berde; Hemal Ingle
- Cinematography: Amol Gole
- Edited by: Faisal – Imran
- Music by: Sachin Pilgaonkar
- Production companies: T-Series; Moving Pictures; Sushriya Chitra
- Distributed by: Panorama Studios
- Release date: 1 March 2019
- Running time: 133 minutes
- Country: India
- Language: Marathi

Ashi Hi Aashiqui is a 2019 Indian Marathi-language romantic drama film written and directed by Sachin Pilgaonkar, featuring Abhinay Berde and Hemal Ingle in the leading roles. The film is produced by T-Series, Moving Pictures and Sushriya Chitra.

== Plot ==
Instead of using Amarja's assistance to impress his crush, Swayam develops feelings for her. After Amarja is diagnosed with a fatal illness, the couple's decision to be married changes the course of events.

== Cast ==
- Abhinay Berde as Swayam Deshmukh
- Hemal Ingle as Amarja Kulkarni
- Karan Bhanushali as Jai
- Sunil Barve as Deshmukh
- Sandeep Pathak as Constable Wakde
- Nirmiti Sawant as Rakhamma
- Snehal Borkar as Avni
- Pooja Pawar as Amarja's mother
- Paritosh Pradhan as Dr. Aditya Kulkarni
- Kishore Anand Bhanushali as Jhonny

== Production ==
Two songs and some parts of the film have been shot in Switzerland. Sachin Pilgaonkar is the first director to shoot a Marathi film in Switzerland. Hemal Ingle was chosen as star opposite to Abhinay Berde, marking her first appearance in the Marathi film.

== Release ==
The film was theatrically released on 1 March 2019 throughout Maharashtra. Previously it was set to be released in theatres on 24 December 2018, and then 14 February 2019.

== Reception ==
=== Critical reception ===
Mayuri Phadnis of The Times of India rated 2.0/5 and wrote "A strong screenplay could have been as gamechanger in for this script. But due to the lack of both, a strong script and good execution, it fails to keep the viewer engaged." Abhijeet Thite of Maharashtra Times rated 2.5/5 and gave mixed review.

== Music ==
The soundtrack album is composed by Sachin Pilgaonkar and the songs are sung by Sonu Nigam, Priyanka Barve, Shanmukha Priya, Janhavi Prabhu Arora under the T-Series lebal.
