= Yeh Pyaar Nahi Toh Kya Hai =

- Genre: Drama; Romance
- Created by: Dilip Jha
- Screenplay by: Dilip Jha; Ghanshyam Bhatt; Dialogues; Mohinder Pratap Singh
- Story by: Dilip Jha; Salil Sand
- Directed by: Noel Smith
- Creative director: Uday Rakesh Berry
- Starring: See below
- Theme music composer: Rahul Jain
- Opening theme: Yeh Pyaar Nahi Toh Kya Hai
- Country of origin: India
- Original language: Hindi
- No. of seasons: 1
- No. of episodes: 120

Production
- Executive producer: Manoj Sharma
- Producers: Dilip Jha; Archita Jha; Nazim; Sahir Hamid
- Cinematography: Shanu Singh Rajput; Pappu Singh Rajput
- Editor: Sameer Gandhi
- Camera setup: Multi-camera
- Running time: 22 minutes
- Production companies: Bindu Productions; SJ Studios

Original release
- Network: SET India
- Release: 19 March – 31 August 2018

Yeh Pyaar Nahi Toh Kya Hai (transl. What Is This, If Not Love?) is an Indian romantic drama television series. Produced by Bindu and SJ Studio Productions, it premiered on 19 March 2018 on Sony TV and starred Palak Jain and Namit Khanna.

The show has been critically acclaimed for its crisp story line and ensemble cast's performance.

== Plot ==
The show is set in Delhi, and revolves around Siddhant Sinha and Anushka Reddy.

Anushka Reddy, daughter of Telugu industrialist Krishna Kanth "KK" Reddy returns home after spending seven years in the US. Siddhant Sinha is a budding lawyer, belongs to middle-class Brahmin family from Bihar, and is the son of lawyer Prabhakar Sinha who was KK's legal advisor, right-hand man, confidante, and best friend. Siddhant and Anushka are childhood friends, who broke up seven years earlier due to misunderstandings.

Siddhant’s father, Prabhakar, supports KK in both business and personal matters, partly out of gratitude for help he received from him 18 years earlier, as well as their long-standing friendship. Siddhant later joins his father at the Reddys’ company, where Anushka works as the head of Human Resources.

When an accident occurs at a rival company owned by Sumit Goyal, he accuses KK’s company of sabotage, alleging it was intended to recover a lost deal. Although the investigation clears KK’s firm of wrongdoing, Prabhakar remains suspicious that someone influential may have been involved. While attempting to uncover the truth behind the incident and the deal, Prabhakar dies; doctors attribute his death to sudden cardiac arrest caused by acid reflux.

=== 15 days later ===
After Prabhakar's death, Siddhant starts to work full time for KK's son and Anushka's twin brother, Karthik and tries to mend his relationship with Anushka. As they get closer, Siddhant also starts investigating his father's death after finding a suspicious phone number from his father's mobile phone call history. The number leads him to Dinesh Swamy, Vice President of Goyal's aircraft company. He is shocked to discover that Swamy died exactly like Prabhakar shortly after Prabhakar's death. Meanwhile, Anushka's father is trying to convince her to marry.

KK brings Nupur Srivastava as a prospective bride for Karthik. During Karthik's wedding preparations, KK gets impressed by Nupur's politician cousin, Vedant. KK asks Anushka to accept, but since she loves Siddhant, she does not want to. Siddhant also loves Anushka, but during investigation he was shocked to know that his father was murdered by his best friend KK by poisoning him via 25 years of KKR Corporation Book. So he decides it is best to keep Anushka out of the picture as he wants to take revenge to her father. Meanwhile, Karthik works closely with Purva, Siddhant's sister, in KK's company. Karthik starts to develop a physical attraction towards Purva but tries not to act upon it.

Siddhant wishes to ruin KK and his business, therefore, he creates major misunderstandings between KK's business partners often referred to as "SHARK" and creates rifts between KK's family. Meanwhile, KK is finally seen admitting his involvement in Prabhakar's death when he is by himself.

Misunderstandings increase between Siddhant and Anushka, therefore, she decides to agree to marry Vedant. Siddhant on the other hand finds out that Vedant is only marrying Anushka for money and power reasons for his career and does not love her.

Siddhant decides he wants both his love and revenge, so on Anushka's engagement day, he openly declares his love for Anushka. Although he is met with disapproval, KK says that his happiness lies in Anushka and lets them get engaged. After the ceremony, Siddhant tells KK about how he knows KK is the reason behind Prabhakar's death and that he will take revenge for that. Siddhant quits his job at Reddy Corporation and decides to go solo. He finds out that Reddy Corporation has been very sexist towards women and fires every woman who gets pregnant and asks for maternity leave. Siddhant finds over 300 cases such as this and decides to represent them all in court, pro bono

In order to prevent Siddhant and Anushka from marrying, KK threatens Gayatri, Siddhant's mother, to stop Siddhant from marrying Anushka. Despite his mother's reluctance and KK's planning, Siddhant and Anushka get married. As KK's initial plan fails, he decides to go to Plan B, by framing Siddhant with the murder of Hira Sanyal, H of SHARK. Siddhant and Anushka finally get married, but she learns about how Siddhant believes KK killed Prabhakar. Siddhant and Anushka decide to not move their relationship forward until Siddhant is able to prove KK guilty.

Meanwhile, Karthik and Purva start to talk more and get closer. One day, Nupur sees a suspicious message on Karthik's phone, from Purva and starts to suspect them. Karthik and Nupur have an argument, in which he declares his love for Purva, and KK hears this. Purva and Karthik talk and Purva finds out the truth behind Prabhakar's death. Purva also declares her feelings for Karthik. Karthik goes to declare his love for Purva to Sinha family. Siddhant beats Karthik and Gayatri slaps Purva. Finally, Anushka learns the truth about her father. Heartbroken, she goes to meet her father and tells him that she has realised the truth about him and asks him whether his love for her was also fake as his reputation. Feeling completely dejected KK confesses his mistakes in front of Anushka and tells her that everything could be a lie but his love for her as a father was never a lie then he hugs her for a last time and sends her away and later ends his life by drinking the same poison by which he poisoned Prabhakar. The series ends with a hug between a conflicted Siddhant and a heartbroken Anushka.

== Cast ==
=== Main ===
- Palak Jain as Anushka Reddy Sinha: Nita and Krishna Kanth's daughter; Shrikant and Kartik's sister; Siddhant's wife
  - Khushi Joshi as Young Anushka
- Namit Khanna as Siddhant Sinha: Gayatri and Prabhakar's son; Purva's elder brother; Anushka's husband
  - Divyagaurav Rana as Young Siddhant

=== Recurring ===
- Manish Choudhary as Krishna Kanth "K.K." Reddy: Nita's husband; Anushka, Shrikant and Kartik's father
- Shahana Verma as Nita Reddy: Krishna Kanth's wife; Anushka, Shrikant and Kartik's mother
- Vishal Malhotra as Shrikant "Anna" Reddy; Nita and Krishna Kanth's elder son; Anushka and Kartik's brother; Riddhi's husband
- Suparna Krishna as Riddhi Nanda Reddy: Sudhanshu's daughter; Shrikant's wife
- Ankit Raj as Kartik Reddy: Nita and Krishna Kanth's younger son; Anushka and Shrikant's brother; Nupur's husband
- Divya Sharma as Nupur Srivastava Reddy: Kartik's wife
- Anurag Arora as Prabhakar Sinha: Gayatri's husband; Siddhant and Purva's father
- Alka Amin as Gayatri Sinha: Prabhakar's wife; Siddhant and Purva's mother
- Amandeep Sidhu as Purva Sinha: Gayatri and Prabhakar's daughter; Siddhant's younger sister
- Reuben Israel as Sudhanshu Nanda: Riddhi's father
- Radha Bhatt as Heera Sanyal
- Gagan Rajput as Sweety Singh, Siddhant's assistant and friend
- Dinesh Mohan as Sumit Goyal: K.K.'s business rival
- Akash Jaiswal as Vedant Srivastava: A politician; Nupur's cousin
- Aamir Abbas Naqvi, as an Advocate in 1 episode
- Altamash as Ravi: Anushka's driver

== Production ==
The show is shot in New Delhi and Greater Noida.

== Soundtrack ==
No.	Title	Lyrics	Music	Singer(s)	Length
1.	"Yeh Pyaar Nahi Toh Kya Hai"	Sanjeev Chaturvedi	Rahul Jain	Rahul Jain	3:55
