= Ravish Desai =

Indian actor and model

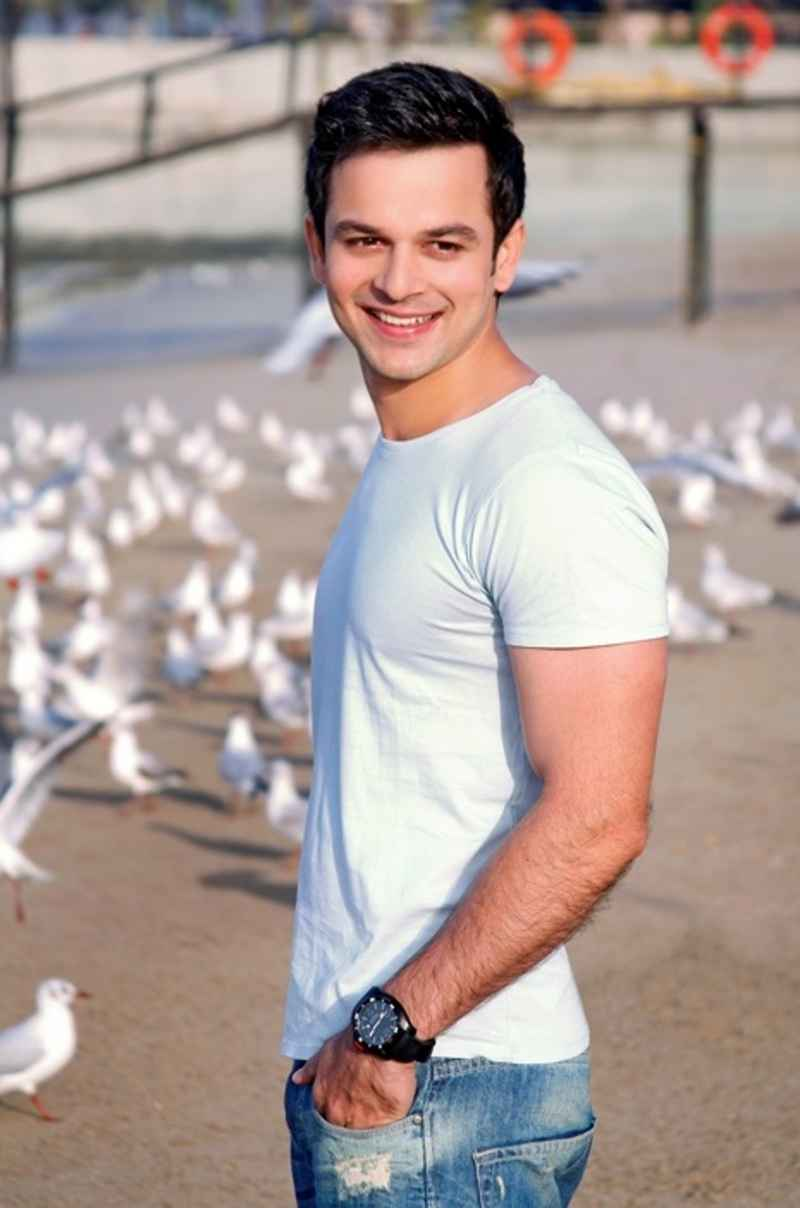
- Desai in 2012
- Born: 22 November 1986 (age 39); Mumbai, Maharashtra, India
- Occupations: Actor; Model
- Years active: 2010–present
- Spouse: Mugdha Chaphekar (m. 2016; div. 2025)

Ravish Desai (born 22 November 1986) is an Indian actor and model who works in Bollywood movies, Hindi-language TV serials and web series. He is mostly known for his work in TV commercials.

== Early and personal life ==
Ravish Desai was born on 22 November 1986 in Mumbai into a Gujarati family to parents Mukesh Desai and Alpa Desai. He received his schooling from G.D. Somani Memorial School, Cuffe Parade. He completed his graduation in Bachelor of Commerce from Jai Hind College. He went on to complete his post graduation from JBIMS.

After finishing his MBA, Ravish worked as a consultant with JP Morgan Chase, Ernst and Young. He then quit his job to pursue his dream of becoming an actor. He was always fascinated by cinema during his childhood. He is also trained in Karate with a Brown Belt ownership.

He met actress Mugdha Chaphekar on the sets of the show Satrangi Sasural where they played leads in 2014. They fell in love and got engaged on 30 January 2016 and married on 14 December the same year in Mumbai. The couple announced their divorce in April 2025 with Desai confirming that they had separated a year ago. However the two continue to be friends.

== Filmography ==
Year	Film	Role	Language	Ref.
2013	Horror Story	Magesh	Hindi	
2017	Whatsup Zindagi	Bhavesh	Gujarati	
2024	CTRL	Aryan K	Hindi	
2024	Vijay 69	Abhimanyu	Hindi	

== Television ==
Year	Serial	Role	Notes
2013–2014	Ek Nanad Ki Khushiyon Ki Chaabi – Meri Bhabhi	Kunal Srivastav	Lead Role
2014	Yeh Hai Aashiqui	Arjit	Episodic Role
2014–2016	Satrangi Sasural	Vihaan Vatsal	Lead Role
2017–2018	Kunwara Hai Par Hamara Hai	Manav	Lead Role
2024–2025	Kaise Mujhe Tum Mil Gaye	Shubh Kadam	

== Web series ==
Year	Show	Role	Co-star	Platform
2019	Made In Heaven	Vishal Srivastav	Shweta Tripathi	Amazon Prime Video
2022	She (season 2)	Amey	Aditi Pohankar	Netflix
2023	Scoop	Bhavesh Desai		Netflix
2026	Hunkkaar	Inspector Santosh		JioHotstar
