= Namit Khanna =

Indian television actor (born 1984)

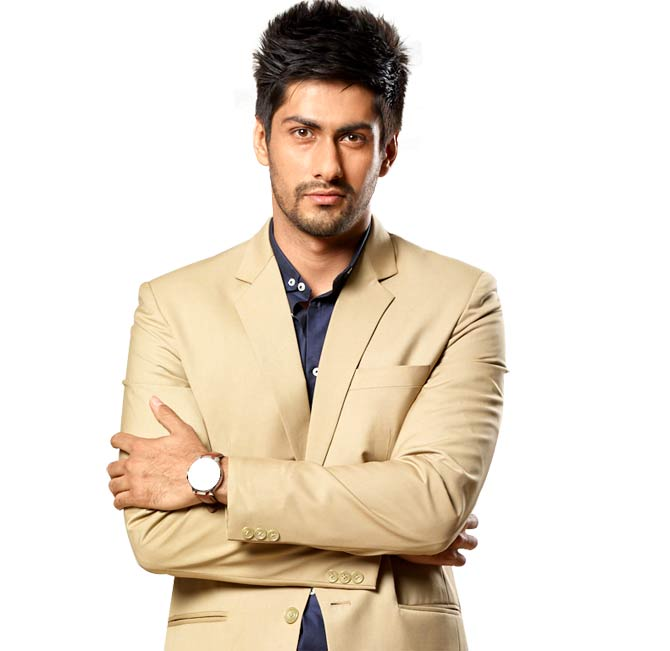
- Born: 29 October 1984 (age 41); Delhi, India
- Occupation: Actor
- Years active: 2017–present
- Known for: Dr.Sid, Siddhant Sinha

Namit Khanna (born 29 October 1984) is an Indian actor known for portraying Siddhant Sinha in Yeh Pyaar Nahi Toh Kya Hai and Dr. Siddhant "Sid" Mathur in Sanjivani.

== Early life ==
Khanna hails from Delhi. He completed his Bachelor of Business Administration from Kingston University, London. He started his modelling career in 2004.

After modelling for almost a decade, he decided to retire from it.

== Career ==
Khanna made his acting debut in 2017 with Vikram Bhatt's Twisted as Ranbir Raichand opposite Nia Sharma.

In 2018, he made his television debut with Sony TV's Yeh Pyaar Nahi Toh Kya Hai as Siddhant Sinha opposite Palak Jain.

From 2019 to 2020, he portrayed Dr. Siddhant "Sid" Mathur in Star Plus's Sanjivani

In December 2021, he made his debut in music videos through music video titled Butterfly opposite Anupamaa actress Madalsa Sharma Chakraborty(sung by Dev Negi and Swati Sharma).

== Media ==
Khanna was listed 17th in Times of India's list of Top 20 Most Desirable Men on Indian Television 2019.

In 2019, he was placed 28th in Eastern Eye's Top 50 Sexiest Asian Men List. He was also ranked 19th in Biz Asia's TV Personality List 2019. He ranked 10th in Biz Asia's TV Personality List 2020.

== Filmography ==
=== Television ===
Year	Show	Role	Ref(s)
2018	Yeh Pyaar Nahi Toh Kya Hai	Siddhant Sinha	
2019–2020	Sanjivani	Dr. Siddhant "Sid" Mathur	

=== Web ===
Year	Title	Role	Platform	Reference
2017	Twisted	Ranbir Raichand	Jio Cinema	
2019	Sepia	Farhaz	YouTube	

=== Music Videos ===
Year	Title	Platform	Singer(s)	Co-actor	Notes	References
2021	Butterfly	MRM(Music and Shorts)	Dev Negi, Swati Sharma	Madalsa Sharma Chakraborty	Debut Music Video	
2023	DP Zooom	MinaraFilm	Dev Negi, Pritam Das	Vedika Bhandari	Music Video	
