= Yeh Teri Galiyan =

Indian drama television series

- Genre: Drama
- Created by: Palki Malhotra
- Written by: Sneha Desai; Tushar
- Screenplay by: Sudhir Kumar Singh; Vikash Tiwari
- Story by: Pavni Mehndiratta
- Creative director: Somnath Kamble
- Starring: Vrushika Mehta; Avinash Mishra
- Music by: Dharmendra Javada
- Country of origin: India
- Original language: Hindi
- No. of seasons: 1
- No. of episodes: 411

Production
- Producers: Prem Krishen; Sunil Mehta
- Cinematography: Shambu Ojha; Suresh Mohanty
- Editors: Vinay Mandal; Swapnil Nerurkar; Sanjay Shankar Sapate
- Camera setup: Multi-camera
- Running time: 22 minutes
- Production companies: Cinevistaas Limited; Thiru Pictures

Original release
- Network: Zee TV
- Release: 25 July 2018 – 14 February 2020

Yeh Teri Galiyan (These Are Your Streets) is an Indian drama television series that premiered on 25 July 2018 on Zee TV. Produced by Cinevistaas Limited, it starred Avinash Mishra and Vrushika Mehta. It replaced Woh Apna Sa in its timeslot.

The story rotates around two youthful kids, Shantanu and Puchki, who can't survive without each other yet are isolated at a young age. The darlings meet again years after the fact yet are illegal to rejoin by the limitations of the general public.

== Plot ==
The story starts when pregnant Arpita and her husband Shubhankar "Shubhu" arrive in Kolkata to meet Shubhu's parents, only to realise that Shubhu plans to sell Arpita to Sonagachi, a place for prostitutes. Arpita delivers her baby and is given to Shantanu who names her Puchki.

Puchki and Shantanu grow up to be bestfriends, but later get separated when Shantanu gets adopted by Arindam Mazumdar, who turns out to be his biological father. Shantanu is given the name Shaan by his new family who accept and love him.

Months later, Shantanu is seen happy while Puchki is seen taking care of on ill Arpita who later dies. Shantanu's step-mother, Nivedita, heavily pregnant, confronts Chanda, Shantanu's mother, believing that she is trying to seduce Arindam, but Thaku Maa, the owner of Sonagachi, reveals to her that Arindam used to visit their brothel years ago, impregnating Chanda with Shantanu. Devastated, Nivedita attempts to leave The Mazumdar Mansion, but accidentally slips and falls when Shantanu tried stopping her. In hospital, her newborn son is revealed to be handicapped because of the fall, blames Shantanu and begins to hate and conspires against him.

Emotionally blackmailmed and brainwashed by Nivedita, Shantanu cuts all ties with Puchki and Chanda. In a series of events, Shantanu believes that his mother has died and that Puchki is at fault, then moves to London.

When Shaan comes face to face with Puchki as Asmita after many years, he fails to recognise her. Their friendship truly becomes a romance only after Shaan realises that Asmita is his childhood friend Puchki. Asmita always felt Shaan loved her because she was his childhood best friend and not for the woman she has become. Asmita gets engaged to Ridoy, and Shaan to Beauty's step - daughter, Paromita. The two are somehow married but Shaan refuses to accept their marriage . In a series of events, Chanda dies, and Shaan realises his mistake and tries to win back Asmita, but blaming him for Chanda's death, she decides to marry Ridoy and seek vengeance on Shaan while on the other hand, Shaan helps Paromita elope with her lover and father to her unborn child, Mohit.

Shaan refuses to give up on Asmita and tries to win her back. Asmita and Ridoy go to Mumbai for their honeymoon where Asmita starts regretting her irrationally made decision to marry Ridoy as he becomes violent and possessive. Ridoy tries forcing himself on Asmita but Shaan saves her. Ridoy and Shaan are in a scuffle on the terrace of the hotel they are in and Ridoy slips and falls. Ridoy suffers from severe injuries and slips into a minor coma but later wakes up only to have the mind of a child .

Shaan finds out that Ridoy was faking by pretending to push him off a cliff with his wheelchair. Ridoy admits to everything and the brothers fight, but when Asmita arrives, Ridoy makes it look like Shaan attacked him where he accidentally slips off the cliff. Ridoy is declared dead and Asmita arrests Shaan for Ridoy's murder as she was a witness to everything and Shaan begins hating her.

Asmita returns to the Mazumdar Mansion with a baby claiming it belongs to her and Ridoy where in actual fact it belongs to Ridoy and a woman he met from Sonagachi. Shaan and Asmita still have their differences but when it seems they were reconciling, Nivedita attempts to kill Shaan in an accident, but intentionally lets him survive as he loses his memory of Asmita. Thaku Maa makes an entry with an unknown girl claiming to be Puchki and deems Asmita the fake one. Shaan is in love with Asmita, but doesn't accept it as he believes Asmita is Ridoy's wife and does not know that Ridoy is dead. On the other hand, it is revealed that Ridoy is alive but in a coma and is getting treated secretly by Nivedita. Shaan's wedding with the fake Puchki is fixed and she is revealed to be Nandini, a spoilt brat that studied in London with Shaan but became obsessed with him as Shaan never noticed her. They get engaged though Shaan does not love her. Shaan finds out that Ridoy is dead and so he proposes marriage to Asmita on his wedding day abandoning Nandini.

Just as Shaan is about fill Asmita’s forehead with sindoor, Nivedita makes an entry with Ridoy shocking everyone. Just as he did with Nandini, Shaan leaves Asmita and goes back to Nandini and marries her. He explains to Asmita that Puchki [fake] is only his friend and Asmita is the woman he loves and wants to spend the rest of his life with, but because Ridoy is back, he sacrifices his love and stays with Nandini, but does not accept her. Later, Nivedita meets a devastated Asmita and reveals to her that Shaan’s accident, Thaku Maa and Nandini's arrival were part of her plan to separate her from Shaan and to trouble her, but Asmita promises to win Shaan back.

On finding out he has a daughter and realising his mistake, Ridoy apologises to Shaan and Asmita for trying to separate them and promises to reunite them. On Shaan and Nandini's reception, Asmita’s father goes to the Mazumdar Mansion where Nandini hugs and calls him her father. Asmita and Ridoy question Shubhankar about his betrayal as they asked him to help them expose Nandini. Shubhankar reveals that not long after leaving Arpita in the brothel of Sonagachi, he married a billionaire, lived in London and had a daughter, Asmita’s younger half sister, Nandini, and was raised by Thaku Maa. Ridoy and Asmita recreate the night of Ridoy's first accident from Mumbai and Shaan regains his memories.

Shaan demands a divorce from Nandini but refuses, calling Asmita the other woman and breaking their marriage. She continues to humiliate Asmita but Shaan later leaves her, marries Asmita and lives with her elsewhere and they consummate their marriage. Shaan is framed for a crime he didn’t commit, Shubhankar's murder which was committed by Nandini. Asmita goes from being a cop to becoming a lawyer to save Shaan. When all of this fails, Asmita decides to take the blame and is arrested. Shaan kidnaps Asmita and runs from the authorities. They spend a night in a hut where Asmita faints and is rushed to the doctor by Shaan. The doctor reveals Asmita is pregnant, but pleads to Shaan to let her surrender as the police find them. As soon as Asmita returns to prison, Shaan pleads to Nandini to get Asmita released as she is now pregnant and will do anything she says to for his wife and child.

Shaan makes a deal with Shaan forcing him to agree to her conditions. He agrees but later breaks the deal after Asmita returns to their home. Angered, Nandini decides to scare Shaan by putting Asmita’s life in danger which works because he agrees to her conditions .

Asmita and Shaan are living happily awaiting their baby's arrival. Shaan takes Asmita to the doctor for her sonography. Before they head back home, Asmita sees Thaku Maa and Nandini in the same hospital as she waits for Shaan to get her medicines. She sees them entering the gynaecologist for a sonography and finds out that Nandini is 4 months pregnant with Shaan's baby. Nandini tells Asmita that Shaan had spent a night with her to protect their unborn child. Nandini also reveals that she had gone to see a doctor to make sure she falls pregnant.

Devastated, Asmita leaves Shaan and is hit by a truck. During the operation, Asmita chooses to save her child's life if one of them has to die and gives birth to a baby girl. A nurse tells Asmita that her baby is dead, but tells Shaan that Asmita instructed them to save her and not the baby's life. Asmita and Shaan blame one another for their baby's death and part ways with Shaan pulling of Asmita’s mangalsutra and wiping her sindoor. Nandini is shown to be paying the nurse who lied about the baby to kill it. The takes the bribe but does not kill the baby, rather gives it to another hospital warden to take care of it.

Fate brings Shaan and Asmita together once again as they find out that their daughter whom they presumed dead is alive and her name is Krishi. Shaan has a daughter with Nandini, Chahat, who is a mean spoilt brat. At first, Shaan refuses to believe that Krishi is his daughter as Nandini brainwashes him into thinking the child belongs to Asmita and her second husband, Vikram Shekhawat.

Shaan and Asmita still have feelings for each other, but now they both hesitate to act on it. Krishi takes it upon herself and comes up with unique ways to bring her birth parents together as Nivedita, who has become a good person again, tells her the truth only to get rid of Nandini. Mr Verma wants to test Shaan’s love for Asmita and prove that their love is not valid. He hires Asmita’s lookalike to confuse Shaan. However, Shaan holds both Devika and Asmita’s hands and immediately realises who the real Asmita is. In a bid to make Asmita stay with him, Mr Shekhawat kidnaps Krishi. He tries to blackmail Asmita into being with him, but Shaan and Asmita join forces to save their daughter. Shekhawat shoots Shaan and Asmita when they try to rescue Krishi. Shaan is shot in his knee, but Asmita is badly wounded with the gunshot and dies in Shaan’s arms and ask him to hide her death from Krishi.

Shaan hires Devika to take her place. Shaan refuses to let Devika get close to him and keeps telling her ways to make people believe that she is Asmita. Eventually, Devika also falls in love with Shaan, but he refuses to accept her as his wife.At the end, Akira kidnaps Devika. But Nivedita, Chaahat, Krishi and Shaan find her and finally Akira gets arrested. Devika and Shaan get married with Nivedita’s blessings. The show ends with a happy note.

== Cast ==
=== Main ===
- Avinash Mishra as Shantanu Mazumdar — Arindham and Chanda's son; Nivedita's step-son; Hridoy's half-brother; Paromita's former husband; Puchki, Nandini and Devika's husband; Krishi and Chahat's father (2018–2020)
  - Ayaan Zubair Rahmani as child Shantanu Mazumdar (2018)
- Vrushika Mehta as
  - Puchki Chaubey Mazumdar — Shubhankar and Arpita's daughter; Nandini's half-sister; Vikram's former wife; Shantanu's first wife; Krishi's mother; Chahat's step-mother (2018–2020)
    - Ruchi Mahajan as
      - child Puchki Chaubey (2018)
      - Krishi Mazumdar — Shantanu and Puchki's daughter; Nandini and Devika's step-daughter; Chahat's half-sister (2019–2020)
  - Asmita Kumari Mazumdar — Puchki's fake identity; Shantanu's wife (2018–2020)
  - Devika Ghosh Mazumdar — Puchki's look-alike; Shantanu's third wife; Krishi and Chahat's step-mother (2020)

=== Recurring ===
- Sharhaan Singh as Shubhankar Chaubey — Arpita's husband; Puchki and Nandini's father; Krishi and Chahat's grandfather (2018–2019)
- Akansha Sareen as Arpita Chaubey — Shubhankar's wife; Puchki's mother; Nandini's step-mother; Krishi's grandmother; Chahat's step-grandmother (2018)
- Govind Pandey as Ravindra Mazumdar — Sukriti's brother; Arindham, Nilambar and Moushmi's father; Shaantanu and Hridoy's grandfather; Krishi and Chahat's great-grandfather (2018–2019)
- Sejal as Sukriti Mazumdar — Ravindra's sister (2018–2019)
- Kiran Janjani as Arindham Mazumdar — Ravindra's son; Nilambar and Moushmi's brother; Nivedita's husband; Shantanu and Hridoy's father; Krishi and Chahat's grandfather (2018)
- Anandi Tripathi as Chanda — Arindham's lover; Shantanu's mother; Krishi and Chahat's grandmother (2018–2019)
- Raymon Singh as Nivedita Mazumdar — Arindham's wife; Hridoy's mother; Shantanu's step-mother; Krishi and Chahat's step-grandmother (2018–2020)
- Lavin Gothi as Hridoy Mazumdar — Arindham and Nivedita's son; Shantanu's half-brother (2018–2019)
- Sonal Vengurlekar as Nandini Chaubey Mazumdar — Shubhankar's daughter; Arpita's step-daughter; Puchki's half-sister; Shantanu's second wife; Chahat's mother; Krishi's step-mother (2019)
- Pari Mistry as Chahat Mazumdar — Shantanu and Nandini's daughter; Puchki and Devika's step-daughter; Krishi's half-sister (2019–2020)
- Harsh Mittal as Nilambar Mazumdar — Ravindra's son; Arindham and Moushmi's brother; Beauty's husband (2018–2019)
- Renee Dhyani as Beauty Singh Mazumdar — Komila's daughter; Nilambar's wife (2018–2019)
- Lopamudra Das as Moushmi Mazumdar Anand — Ravindra's daughter; Arindham and Nilambar's sister; Bijoy's wife (2018–2019)
- Bharat Kamuvani as Bijoy Anand — Moushmi's husband (2018)
- Shubhangi Latkar as Komila "Thakumaa" Singh — Beauty's mother (2018–2019)
- Kinjal Pandya as Paromita Sanyal: Shantanu's former wife; Mohit's girlfriend (2018–2019)
- Piyush Sahdev as Vikram Shekhawat: Puchki's former husband; Nirvan's father (2019)
- Shaynam Ladakhi as Manchand "Murli" Pandey — Beauty's assistant (2018–2019)
- Rajvir Chauhan as Ashish — Krishi's foster-father (2018–2019)

=== Cameo appearances ===
- Silambarasan
- Jiiva
- Disha Parmar
- Venkatesh

== Production ==
The show initially starred child actors Ayaan Zubair Rahmani and Ruchi Mahajan as Shantanu and Puchki. Following a 20 year leap, Manish Goplani and Vrushika Mehta were chosen as their elder characters, though later Goplani left the series and Avinash Mishra replaced him. In 2019, Mahajan returned to the series, but as the leads' daughter. Mehta's role of Puchki died in January 2020 and a new character as Devika was introduced as her lookalike, also played by Mehta. Due to low TRP ratings, the show went off culmination on 14 February 2020. In September 2018, it had a crossover episode with Kaleerein.

== Adaptations ==
- In Indonesia (Indonesian) began airing on ANTV with the title Yeh Teri Galiyan on 2 March 2020 to 2 August 2020.
