= Epic Bharat =

Indian Hindi-language television channel

- Country: India
- Headquarters: Mumbai, Maharashtra, India

Programming
- Language: Hindi
- Picture format: 1080p (FHD)

Ownership
- Owner: The Epic Company
- Sister channels: Epic Parivaar; Epic Bhojpuri; Epic Kids; Epic Music; Epic TV

History
- Launched: 1 April 2023; 3 years ago

Availability

Streaming media
- Epic ON: Nazara

Epic Bharat is an Indian Hindi-language general entertainment television channel owned by The Epic Company. The network's programming includes family dramas, romantic serials, thrillers and crime serials.

== History ==
In 2023 IN10 Media announced that it would launch a new Hindi language Entertainment channel on 1 April 2023. Eventually the channel was launched on DD Free Dish.

== Programming ==
=== Current broadcast ===
Premiere Date	Show
Acquired Shows
2026	Crime Files
2025	Bindiya Sarkar

=== Former shows ===
Original shows

Year	Show
2023-2024	Do Chutki Sindoor
2023-2024	Beti Hamari Anmol
2023-2024	Laal Banarasi
2023-2024	Dhartiputra Nandini
2024–2025	Dahej Daasi

Acquired shows

Year	Show
2023	Ramayan
2023	Uttar Ramayana
2023-2024	Teen Bahuraaniyaan
2023-2024	Mere Sai – Shraddha Aur Saburi
2023-2024	Crime Patrol
2023-2024	Do Dil Bandhe Ek Dori Se
2024	Bhagonwali – Baante Apni Taqdeer
2024	Bhagyavidhata
2024	Santoshi Maa
2024	Jamai Raja
2024	Maa Shakti
2024–2025	Mrs. Kaushik Ki Paanch Bahuein
2024–2025	Piya Ka Ghar
2024–2025	Chotti Bahu
2024–2025	Afsar Bitiya
2024–2025	Waaris
2025	Woh Apna Sa
2025	Main Bhi Ardhangini
2025–2026	Rang Jaun Tere Rang Mein
2025–2026	Deewani
2026	Nath – Zewar Ya Zanjeer
2026	Gehna – Zewar Ya Zanjeer

== See also ==
- Epic Parivaar
- Epic TV
