= Do Chutki Sindoor =

Indian drama television series

- Genre: Drama
- Created by: Sumeet Hukamchand Mittal; Shashi Mittal
- Story by: Sameer Garud; Prashant Rati; Dialogues; Girish Dhamija
- Directed by: Amandeep Singh
- Creative director: Tripti Vatsa
- Theme music composer: Puneet Dixit; Isha Gaur; Sauvik Chakraborty
- Opening theme: Do Chutki Sindoor Maang Me
- Country of origin: India
- Original language: Hindi
- No. of seasons: 1
- No. of episodes: 150

Production
- Producers: Shashi Mittal; Sumeet H Mittal; Jitendra Singhla
- Cinematography: Mohit Jhadav
- Editors: Omkar Singh; Alok Raj Singh
- Camera setup: Multi-camera
- Running time: 22-24 minutes
- Production company: Shashi Sumeet Productions

Original release
- Network: Nazara TV
- Release: 19 June 2023 – 12 January 2024

Do Chutki Sindoor (transl. Two Pinches Of Vermillion ) is an Indian Hindi Drama Indian television series produced by Shashi Sumeet Productions which was premiered on 19 June 2023 on Nazara TV. The series stars Radhika Muthukumar and Shubham Dipta.

== Plot ==
The narrative centers on the life of a young woman named Siddhi, who has a mentally challenged younger sister, Maya. Siddhi shares everything with Maya, but when it comes to Siddhi's marriage, Maya asks her to share her husband as well. Can she also share her husband with Maya?

== Cast ==
- Radhika Muthukumar as Siddhi Vinayak Pandey: Balram and Revati's daughter; Sunaina's stepdaughter, Maya and Riddhi's half-sister; Vinayak's first wife
- Shubham Dipta as Vinayak Pandey
- Srishti Singh as
  - Maya
  - Riddhi
- Priyanka Rathod as Kumari
- Jay Javeri as Mahadev
- Aishana Singh as Nisha Pandey
- Priyamvda Singh as Sushma
- Jyoti Gauba as Jaya Pandey; Vinayak's mother
- Jatin Suri as Tanmay
- Kritya Karda as Jagruti
- Hariom Kalra
- Namrata Kapoor as Sunaina; Balram's second wife; Maya's mother and Siddhi's stepmother
- Jayati Bhatia as Dhanlakshmi Pandey "Dadiya"

== Crossover Episodes ==
No. Of Episodes	Original Air Date	Serial
2	18 & 21 August 2023	Laal Banarasi

== Soundtrack ==
Savan Bhi Tu

Soundtrack album
- Released: 2023
- Genre: Romance; Soundtrack
- Length: 1:21
- Language: Hindi
- Label: IN10 Media

Tracklisting
No.	Title	Length
1.	"Savan Bhi Tu"	1:21
