= Beti Hamari Anmol =

Indian drama television series

- Title card
- Genre: Drama; Romance
- Screenplay by: Sarvesh V Pandey
- Story by: Rakesh Paswan; Dialogues; Shivendra Singh
- Directed by: Shravan R Sivach
- Starring: Pratham Kunwar; Juhi Aslam; Rani Chatterjee; / Garima dixit
- Composer: Sanjay Sompura
- Country of origin: India
- Original language: Hindi
- No. of seasons: 1
- No. of episodes: 120

Production
- Producer: Rakesh Paswan
- Cinematography: SAJID SHAIKH / Daini
- Editors: Jay B Gadiwali; Harveer Singh Pal
- Camera setup: Multi-camera
- Running time: 22-24 minutes
- Production company: Balark Entertainment

Original release
- Network: Nazara TV
- Release: 6 November 2023 – 23 April 2024

Beti Hamari Anmol (transl. Our Precious Daughter Anmol) an Indian Hindi-language Drama series starring Juhi Aslam and Pratham Kunwar. It was Produced by Rakesh Paswan under Balark Entertainment. It premiered on 6 November 2023 and aired on Nazara TV.

== Plot ==
The story is about a girl named Anmol who lives in a small town. She faces many challenges because of Her Short Height. Girls like her are not allowed to study, work or choose their own husband. Anmol is also short, and people call her a "Dwarf," which makes her feel bad. But she doesn't give up and works hard to become a doctor. Her father works as a custodian in the same hospital where she becomes a doctor. Anmol's family is proud of her, and she proves that with determination, one can overcome any obstacle in life.

== Cast ==
=== Main ===
- Juhi Aslam as Anmol, Rishi's wife
- Pratham Kunwar as Rishi, Anmol's Husband

=== Recurring ===
● S Ashraf Karim as Kaptan Singh

- Rani Chatterjee as Tata Wali
- Kapil Soni as Prasadi
- Garima Dixit as arti
- Shailly Shukla as Dadi
- Mohini Singh as Pinky
- Dhanshree Patil as Nilam
- Golu Tiwari as Chirag
- Anusha Sharma as Jugni
- Ranvijay Rao
- Shalini Srivastav
- Soma Aakarshan as Santoshi
- Rinku Ghosh as Shanta Devi

== Soundtrack ==
Beti Hamari Anmol

Soundtrack album by Soumee Sailsh
- Released: 2023
- Genre: Social issue
- Length: 4:44
- Language: Hindi
- Label: IN10 Media

Tracklisting
No.	Title	Length
1.	"Beti Hamari Anmol"
Total length:		4:44
