= Dahej Daasi =

Indian drama television series

- Genre: Drama; Social issue
- Based on: Dowry
- Story by: Shashwat Rai; Dialogues; Pramendar Shekhawat
- Directed by: Mithesh Chithaliya
- Starring: Jahnavi Soni; Rajat Verma; Sayantani Ghosh; Raghav Thakur
- Country of origin: India
- Original languages: Hindi; Rajastani
- No. of seasons: 2
- No. of episodes: 311

Production
- Executive producers: Rivindra Gautham; Raghuveer Shekhawat
- Producer: Anju Rivindra
- Cinematography: Rajan Singh
- Editors: Janak Chauhan; Surya Singh; Pradeep Singh
- Camera setup: Multi-camera
- Running time: 25-26 minutes
- Production company: Mustang Films

Original release
- Network: Nazara
- Release: 12 February 2024 – 11 April 2025

Dahej Daasi (transl. Dowry Maid) is an Indian Hindi social drama television series produced by Mustang Films, which premiered on 12 February 2024 on Nazara. It formerly starred Sayantani Ghosh as Vindhya Devi, Jahnavi Soni as Chunri and Rajat Verma as Jay as the first generation leads. From February 2025, it starred Jhanvi Soni as Jhumki and Raghav Thakur as Arjun as the second generation leads.

== Plot ==
This story revolves around a girl named Chunri, who accompanies the bride as a maid as part of the bride's dowry.

== Cast ==
=== Main ===
- Sayantani Ghosh as double role
  - Vindhya Devi Gaurawat aka Aamna; Vijendra's wife; Sandhya's twin sister; Jay and Ranvijay's Masi; Yash and Sunaina's stepmother; Saransh's aunt; Durga and Jhumki's grandmother; Vansh's grandmother; Yash, Neelima, Samrat, Jay, Chunri, Saheli, Anju and Rashi's murderer; Jhumki and Arjun's rival (2024-2025) (Dead)
    - Kanika; Vindhya Devi's reincarnation (2024)
  - Sandhya Devi Thakur aka Saamna; Vindhya Devi's twin sister; Amrendra's wife; Jay and Ranvijay's Mother; Jhumki and Durga's grandmother (2025)
- Rajat Varma as double role
  - Jay Singh Gaurawat aka Kunwar Sahab/Laxman; Rajkumar; Sandhya and Amrendra's elder son; Vindhya Devi and Vijendra's Nephew; Ranvijay's twin brother; Sunaina and Yash's cousin; Saransh's cousin; Anusha's ex-fiance; Sanjana's ex-love interest; Chunri's husband; Durga's Uncle; Vansh's Uncle; Jhumki's father; Arjun's father-in-law (2024–2025) (Dead)
    - Shyam; Jay's reincarnation (2024)
  - Ranvijay Singh Gaurawat aka Ram; Sandhya and Amrendra's younger son; Vindhya Devi and Vijendra's Nephew; Jay's twin brother; Sunaina and Yash's cousin; Saransh's cousin; Sandhya's husband; Vansh and Jhumki's Uncle; Durga's father; Veer's father-in-law (2024) (Dead)
- Jahnavi Soni as double role
  - Chunri Devi Thakur; Rajkumari; Meera and Sumer's elder daughter; Anusha's elder sister; Jay's wife; Vansh's aunt; Durga's aunt; Sandhya Devi and Amrendra's elder daughter-in-law; Jhumki's mother; Arjun's mother-in-law (2024–2025) (Dead)
    - Tej Pratap Singh (fake) (2024)
    - Rajkumari Chandralekha; Chunri's reincarnation (2024)
  - Jhumki Arjun Pratap Singh (néé Jay Thakur); Rajkumari; Chunri and Jay's daughter; Vansh's cousin; Durga's cousin; Sandhya Devi and Amrendra's granddaughter; Arjun's wife (2025)
    - Riddhi Sharma as young Jhumki (2025)
- Raghav Thakur as Arjun Pratap Singh aka Kunwar Sahab;Rajkumar Saheli and Anju's elder son; Dadi's elder grandson; Veer and Avantika's elder brother; Jhumki's husband; Chunri and Jay's son-in-law (2025)

=== Season 1 ===
==== The Singh Thakur family 1 ====
- Unknown as Amrendra Singh Thakur; Sandhya Devi's husband; Jai and Ranvijay's biological father; Jhumki and Durga's biological grandfather (2025)
- Yukta Upadhyay as Sandhya Ranvijay Thakur; Ranvijay's wife; Sandhya Devi and Amrendra's younger daughter-in-law; Durga's mother; Veer's mother-in-law (2024) (Dead)
- Aayushi Bhatnagar as Durga Veer Pratap Singh (néé Ranvijay Thakur); Sandhya and Ranvijay's daughter; Rashi and Saransh's daughter-figure; Jhumki's cousin; Vansh's adopted cousin; Sandhya Devi and Amrendra's granddaughter; Veer's wife; Arjun and Avantika's sister-in-law (2025)
  - Navya Rathod as young Durga (2025)
  - Devyani Wadekar as child Durga (2024-2025)

==== The Singh Gaurawat family 2 ====
- Ajay Dhansu as Thakur Vijendra Pratap Singh Gaurawat; Aravind's elder brother; Vindhya Devi's husband; Sunaina and Yash's father; Ranvijay and Jay's uncle; Jhumki and Durga's grandfather; Vansh's grandfather; Ranvijay's murderer (2024)
  - Vaarisa alias Ranjit Thakur (2024)
- Vicky Singh Kashyap as Yash Singh Gaurawat; Vindhya Devi and Vijendra's elder son; Jay and Ranvijay's cousin; Sunaina's brother; Saransh's cousin; Vedika 's husband; Jhumki and Durga's uncle; Vansh's uncle (2024) (Dead)
- Simran Sharma as Vedika Gaurawat; Ram Thakur's daughter; Yash's widow; Jhumki and Durga's aunt; Vansh's aunt; Chunri's best-friend; Vindhya Devi and Vijendra's elder daughter-in-law (2024-2025)
- Shamik Abbas as Aravind Singh Gaurawat; Vijendra's younger brother; Mandira's husband; Saransh's father; Sunaina and Yash's uncle; Jay and Ranvijay's uncle; Vansh's granduncle (2024-2025)
- Puja Sahu as Mandira Gaurawat; Aravind's wife; Saransh's mother; Sunaina and Yash's aunt; Jay and Ranvijay's aunt; Vansh's grand-aunt (2024–2025)
- Anuj Kohli as Saransh Singh Gaurawat; Aravind and Mandira's son; Sunaina and Yash's cousin; Jay and Ranvijay's cousin; Rashi's widower; Durga's father-figure; Jhumki's uncle; Vansh's uncle (2024–2025)
- Hina Bajpai as Rashi Gaurawat; Saransh's wife; Durga's mother-figure; Jhumki's aunt; Vansh's aunt (2024-2025) (Dead)

==== The Singh family 3 ====
- Jatin Suri as Abhir Singh; Sunaina's husband; Vindhya Devi and Vijendra's son-in-law; Vansh's father; Jhumki and Durga's uncle (2024)
- Komal Rajput as Sunaina Singh; Vindhya Devi and Vijendra 's younger daughter; Jay and Ranvijay's cousin; Yash's sister; Abhir's wife; Vansh's mother; Jhumki and Durga's Bua (2024–2025)
- Het Makwana as Vanshaj Singh aka Vansh; Sunaina and Abhir's son; Jhumki and Durga's cousin; Vindhya Devi and Vijendra's grandson (2025)

==== Other recurring cast ====
- Shashank Sharma / Saurabh Gumber as Dr.Smrat; Jay's childhood friend; Chunri's ex-lover (2024)
- Vijay Kumar as Anand (2024)
- Neha Pandey as Sanjana; Jay's ex-love interest; Chunri's rival (2024)
- Achal Tankwal as Agni aka Kaalika; Kanika's son; Ranvijay's reincarnation (2024)
- Nishikant Dixit as Ram Thakur; Vedika's father (2024)
- Pawan Mahendru as Veteran Sajarat; Pushpa 's father; Chunri's uncle (2024) (Dead)
- Meena Mir as Shravani Sajarat; Pushpa 's mother; Chunri's aunt (2024) (Dead)
- Jaynishaa Nayak as Pushpa Sajarat; Chunri's cousin (2024)
- Kamaal Malik as Sumer Singh Suryavat; Meera's widower; Chunri and Anusha's father; Jhumki's grandfather (2024)
- Shandana Gulzar Khan as Meera Singh Suryavat; Sumer's wife; Vindhya Devi's friend; Chunri and Anusha's mother; Jhumki's grandmother (2024) (Dead)
- Anvi Tiwari as Anusha Singh Suryavat; Meera and Sumer's younger daughter; Chunri's younger sister and rival; Jay's ex-fiance (2024)
- Jyoti Mangilal Ramawat as (2025)

=== Season 2 ===
==== The Pratap Singh family 4 ====
- Unknown as Thakur Anju Pratap Singh; Saheli's husband; Arjun Veer and Avantika's father (2025) (Dead)
- Unknown as Saheli Devi Pratap Singh; Anju's wife; Arjun Veer and Avantika's mother (2025) (Dead)
- Geeta Dhirendra Udeshi as double role
  - Mrs. Thakur; Ram's wife; Vedika's mother (2024)
  - Dadi Pratap Singh; Anju's mother; Arjun Veer and Avantika's grandmother (2025)
- Bharat Narang as Veer Pratap Singh; Saheli and Anju's younger son; Dadi's younger grandson; Arjun and Avantika's younger brother; Durga's husband; Sandhya and Ranvijay's son-in-law (2025)
- Anshika Pandey as Avantika Pratap Singh aka Kritika; Saheli and Anju's daughter; Dadi's elder granddaughter; Arjun and Veer's sister; Samrat's widow (2025)
- Rudra Singh Rajput as Samrat Singh; Avantika's husband (2025) (Dead)
- Kajal Tiwari as Neelima Pratap Singh aka Preet; Arjun's love interest (2025) (Dead)

== Production ==
Janvi Soni, Rajat Verma were signed as the lead. The first promo was released in January 2024 featuring Janvi Soni and Sayantani Ghosh. Show released on 13 February 2024.
