= Juhi Aslam =

Indian television actress

- Born: Uttar Pradesh, India
- Education: B.Ed
- Years active: 2010-Present
- Spouse: Md Karim (m. 2018)
- Children: Abdul Rahim, Rushda Karim

Juhi Aslam is an Indian television actress known for her role as Bharti Chauhan in the television series Baba Aiso Varr Dhoondo. For this role she won the Indian Television Academy Awards Award for GR8! Performer of the Year (Female) in 2011.

== Personal life ==
Aslam was born in Uttar Pradesh. Her height is 3'6.7". She aspired to be a doctor. Talking about her height in an interview with the Times of India she said: “My height is my biggest strength.” Her first show Baba Aiso Varr Dhoondo is about the lives of people with dwarfism.

In 2018 she married Karim and had a son named Mohammed Rahim.

== Television ==
Year	Show	Role	Notes
2010–2012	Baba Aiso Varr Dhoondo	Bharti Chauhan	
2012	V The Serial	Bharti Chauhan	Special appearance
2013	Qubool Hai	Dolly	
2013	Jodha Akbar	Zakira	
2015–2016	Adhuri Kahaani Hamari	Takshika	
2015	MTV Warrior High	Neeti Awasti	
2016	Iss Pyaar Ko Kya Naam Doon 3	Shilpa	
2017–2018	Badho Bahu	Chhoto Singh Ahlawat	
2020	Gudiya Hamari Sabhi Pe Bhari	Vandana	
2020	Aye Mere Humsafar	Choti Bua	
2023–2024	Beti Hamari Anmol	Anmol	
