= Laal Banarasi =

Indian drama television series

- Genre: Drama
- Story by: Pearl Grey; Divya Neyyar; Abhishek Sharma (Dialogues)
- Directed by: Arvind Gupta
- Theme music composer: Dr Sagar; Tapan Jyothi Dutta; Bittu Merchent
- Opening theme: Laal Banarasi
- Country of origin: India
- Original language: Hindi
- No. of seasons: 1
- No. of episodes: 262

Production
- Executive producer: Pearl Grey
- Producers: Santosh Kumar Singh & Rochelle Singh
- Cinematography: Anup Sharma
- Editors: Janak Chauhan & Surya Singh
- Camera setup: Multi-camera
- Running time: 22-24 minutes
- Production company: Paarth Production

Original release
- Network: Nazara TV
- Release: 9 May 2023 – 14 May 2024

Laal Banarasi (transl. Red Banarasi Sarees) is an Indian Hindi Drama Indian television series produced by Paarth Productions which was premiered on 9 May 2023 on Nazara TV. The series stars Gauri Chitranshi, Savi Thakur and Narayani Shastri.

== Premise ==
The story depicts the struggle of a simple village girl, Gauri, on the river banks of Varanasi. She, alongside her sister, aims to make a livelihood from their textile-based shop as they sell 'Red Banarasi Sarees'. However, Gauri's life turns upside down during an encounter with a hot-headed and upper-class competitor who leading the textile industry in Varanasi, Shakuntala Agarwal and her beloved son Garv who later becomes Gauri's husband.

== Cast ==
=== Main ===
- Gauri Chitranshi as Gauri Sharma / Gauri Garv Sinha: Chandrakant and Shanti's middle daughter; Ganga's younger sister; Chhutki's elder sister; Garv's first wife; Khushi and Kavya's mother; Mahi's adopted mother (2023–2024)
- Narayani Shastri as Shakuntala Agarwal / Shakuntala Dushyant Sinha: Owner of Shakuntala Sarees; Dheerendra's younger sister; Dushyant's estranged wife; Yug and Garv's mother; Khushi and Kavya's grandmother; Mahi's adopted grandmother (2023–2024)
- Savi Thakur as
  - Garv Sinha: Dushyant and Shakuntala's younger son; Nayantara's younger nephew; Gauri and Ganga's husband; Yug's younger brother; Khushi and Kavya's father; Mahi's adopted father (2023–2024)
  - Bunty: Garv's look alike (2024)
- Mahi Soni as Kavya Sinha: Gauri and Garv 's younger daughter; Khushi 's sister(2024)
- Shivanashi Anant as Khushi Sinha; Gauri and Garv 's elder daughter; Kavya's sister(2024)

=== Recurring Cast ===
- Iram Hingwala as Child Chutki Sharma: Chandrakant and Shanti's younger daughter; Ganga and Gauri's younger sister; Khushi and Kavya's younger material aunt; Mahi's adoptive younger maternal aunt (2023)
- Nisha Gupta as Ganga Sharma / Ganga Yug Sinha: Chandrakant and Shanti's elder daughter; Gauri and Chutki's elder sister; Yug's wife; Garv's ex-wife; Khushi and Kavya's elder maternal aunt; Mahi's adoptive elder maternal aunt (2023–2024)
- Manohar Teli as Chandrakant Sharma: Shanti's husband; Gauri, Ganga and Chutki's father; Khushi and Kavya's maternal grandfather (2023)
- Anmol Gupta / Kuldeep Singh as Yug Sinha: Dushyant and Shakuntala's elder son; Nayantara's elder nephew; Ganga's husband; Garv's elder brother (2023) / (2023–2024)
- Pooja Gor as Pooja Gaur
- Hritika Kulthe as Aarushi (2023–present)
- Antara Biswas as Nayantara Sinha: Dushyant's younger sister; Yug and Garv's paternal aunt (2024)
- Sahil Kumar as Mandeep Singh (2024–present)
- Krishna Soni as Dushyant Sinha: Shakuntala's estranged husband; Nayantara's elder brother; Yug and Garv's father; Khushi and Kavya's grandfather; Mahi's adoptive grandfather (2023)
- Shankar Mishra as Mr. Agarwal: Dheerendra and Shakuntala's father; Dushyant and Vrinda's father-in-law; Yug and Garv's maternal grandfather; Anika's paternal grandfather (2023) (Dead)
- Suraj Kalyankar as Goon
- Ruturaj Kute as Raunak Kumar
- Anjum Ara as Mrs. Sharma "Dadi": Chandrakant's mother; Ganga, Gauri and Chutki's grandmother
- Vikram Sharma as Dheerendra Agarwal: Shakuntala's elder brother; Vrinda's husband; Anika's father; Yug and Garv's maternal uncle (2023–2024)
- Mona Ray as Vrinda Dheerendra Agarwal: Dheerendra's wife; Anika's mother; Shakuntala's sister-in-law (2023–2024)
- Priya Varlani as Anika Agarwal: Dheerendra and Vrinda's daughter; Shakuntala's niece (2023)
- Paras Sharma as Nachiket: Anika's ex–fiance (2023)
- Rahul Chaudhary as Ajay Singh
- Neelu Vaghela (2023)
- Apsara Kashyap as Rishika: Garv's ex–girlfriend (2023)
- Pari Sharma as Child Mahi: Adhiraj's daughter; Gauri's adoptive daughter; Dushyant and Shakuntala's adoptive granddaughter (2023)
- Bhawna Singh as Kairi (2023)
- as Adhiraj: Mahi's father (2023) (Dead)

== Crossover Episodes ==
No. Of Episodes	Original Air Date	Serial
2	18 & 21 August 2023	Do Chutki Sindoor
2	9 & 10 November 2023	Dhartiputra Nandini
2	18 & 19 January 2024	Dhartiputra Nandini
2	5 to 9 February 2024	Dhartiputra Nandini

== Production ==
=== Casting ===
Gauri Chitranshi, Savi Thakur and Narayani Shastri were signed as the lead. The first promo was released on 29 April 2023 featuring Gauri Chitranshi and Narayani Shastri. Show Released on 9 May 2023.

=== Development ===
The series was announced by Parth Production in April 2023 and was confirmed in May 2023 by Nazara TV. The shooting of the series began in April 2023 in Varanasi, India.

== Soundtrack ==
Satarangi Se Khwaab

Soundtrack album
- Released: 2023
- Genre: Inspirational
- Length: 2:32
- Language: Hindi
- Label: IN10 Media Network
- Producer: Santosh

Tracklisting
No.	Title	Length
1.	"Satarangi Se; Khwaab"
Total length:		2:32
