= Dhartiputra Nandini =

Indian drama television series

- Genre: Drama; Romance
- Created by: Harsh Jagdeesh
- Developed by: Harsh Jagdeesh
- Story by: Harsh Jagdeesh; Aamed Kherni; Dialogues; Abhishek Sharma, Prabhat Bandhulya
- Directed by: Shashank Bharadwaj; Vipul Mishra
- Country of origin: India
- Original language: Hindi
- No. of seasons: 1
- No. of episodes: 303

Production
- Executive producer: Dipika Chikhlia
- Producer: Dipika Chikhlia
- Cinematography: Veerchandhan Singh
- Editors: Jay B Ghadiyali; Affan Khan
- Camera setup: Multi-camera
- Running time: 22-24 minutes
- Production company: DCT Movies

Original release
- Network: Nazara TV
- Release: 21 August 2023 – 18 October 2024

Dhartiputra Nandini is a Hindi-language television drama series from India that first aired on 21 August 2023 to 18 October 2024 on Nazara TV. The series is produced by Dipika Chikhlia under DCT Movies and features Shagun Singh and Aman Jaiswal in lead roles.

== Plot ==
The series follows the story of a farmer's daughter named Nandini (Shagun Singh). Her love for the land leads her to face numerous challenges. She crosses paths with Sumitra (Dipika Chikhlia), who is dealing with family issues and seeks assistance for her grandson, Akash (Aman Jaiswal). Sumitra enlists Nandini's help for Akash, leading to unexpected familial bonds.

== Cast ==
- Shagun Singh as Nandini Akash Bharadwaj: Akash's wife
- Aman Jaiswal as Akash Bharadwaj; Sumitra 's grandson; Suraj and Neel's cousin; Nandini's husband
- Shriya Tiwari as Kamya Bharadwaj: Imarti's daughter-in-law; Neel's mother
- Seema Anand as Imarti Bharadwaj; Akash and Neel's grandmother;Kamya and Sumitra's mother-in-law;
- Dipika Chikhlia as Sumitra Bharadwaj; Akash's grandmother; Nandini's grandmother-in-law;Imarti's daughter-in-law
- Abhi Sharma as Suraj
- Ruchi Tripathi as Priya
- Karrtik Rao as Veer
- Hritik Yadav as Neel Bharadwaj; Kamya's son; Akash's cousin
- Tanu Shree as Jyoti Bharadwaj; mr.bharadwaj 's wife
- Anuj Ahluwalia as Mr. Bharadwaj; Sumitra's younger grandson; Akash's brother; Jyoti's husband
- Urvashi Upadhyay as Leela Devi
- Gaurav Upadhyay as Ramu; Phooli's brother
- Shahmir Khan as Beera
- Renee Dhyani

== Crossover episodes ==
| No. Of Episodes | Original Air Date | Serial |
|---|---|---|
| 2 | 9–10 November 2023 | Laal Banarasi |
| 2 | 18–19 January 2024 | Laal Banarasi |

== Production ==
=== Casting ===
Shagun Singh was cast as Nandini and Aman Jaiswal as Akash for the series. Dipika Chikhlia was chosen to portray the role of a grandmother. The series marks the return of Dipika Chikhlia to television drama after a hiatus of 33 years. She stated, "In my own production, I am playing a grandmother because the role appealed to me."

The series also marks the return of Renee Dhyani to television after a two-year break. She expressed her desire to work alongside Dipika Chikhlia, who has portrayed the iconic character of Sita.

=== Development ===
The series was announced on Nazara TV by DCT Movies in July 2023. It was produced by Dipika Chikhlia.

In July 2023, Dipika Chikhlia visited Ayodhya's Ram Mandir ahead of the TV show shoot.

=== Filming ===
Principal photography commenced from July 2023 in Ayodya, Uttar Pradesh.
