= Jahnavi Soni =

Actor

- Soni in 2026
- Born: January 7, 2000 (age 26); Jaipur, Rajasthan, India
- Citizenship: Indian
- Education: Maharani College (BBA)
- Years active: 2023 - present
- Known for: Dahej Daasi

Jahnavi Soni is an Indian TV actress and model. She started her acting journey with Ekta Kapoor's Ghar Ek Mandir and became well known for playing Churni Devi Thakur in Dahej Daasi. Since September 2026, she is seen in StarPlus's Sayoneee as Saanvi.

== Filmography ==
=== Television ===
| Year | Title | Roles | Notes | Ref. |
|---|---|---|---|---|
| 2022 | Ghar Ek Mandir | Mohini | | |
| 2023 | Chaudhary Saab Ri Chatur Family | Kavita Chaudhary | | |
| 2024–2025 | Dahej Daasi | Chunri Devi Thakur | Lead double role | |
| 2025 | Dahej Daasi | Jhumki Arjun Pratap Singh | Lead double role | |
| 2025 | Ramayan | Sita | Mini TV Series | |
| 2025 | Paro Sang Dev | Parvati Mallah (Paro) | Lead | |
| 2026–present | Sayoneee | Saanvi Brar | Lead | |

=== Film ===
| Year | Title | Roles |
|---|---|---|
| 2023 | Afwaah | Santosh's sister |
