= Sumit Kaul =

Indian actor

- Born: 10 March 1978 (age 48); Bombay, Maharashtra, India
- Occupation: Actor
- Years active: 2000–present
- Notable work: Tanaav Haider Laila Majnu Chakravartin Ashoka Samrat

Sumit Kaul (born 10 March 1978) is an Indian actor best known for playing Umar Riaz in the web series Tanaav.

Kaul was born in Bombay, Maharashtra into a Kashmiri Pandit family that left Kashmir Valley in the 1990s. He started his acting career in 2000 with Ek Jute, a theatre group headed by Nadira Babbar, where he spent the next four years doing several Hindi and Urdu plays. He has also worked in the films like Haider, Laila Majnu, Mulk and Hamid, and has been part of TV shows like Laagi Tujhse Lagan, Nazar, and web shows like Tanaav. His most recent role is that of Inspector Sandeep Tomar in the movie Afwaah.

== Filmography ==
=== Films ===
| Year | Title | Role | Language | Notes |
|---|---|---|---|---|
| 2003 | Munna Bhai M.B.B.S | College Senior | Hindi | |
| 2010 | Once Upon a Time in Mumbaai | Chhota Rajan | Hindi | |
| 2013 | Bumboo | Dr. D'Souza | Hindi | |
| 2014 | Haider | Salmaan | Hindi | |
| 2018 | Mulk | Mehfooz Alam | Hindi | |
| 2018 | Laila Majnu | Ibban | Hindi | |
| 2019 | Hamid | Rehmat ALI | Hindi | |
| 2021 | Bell Bottom | Agent Dollar | Hindi | |
| 2023 | Afwaah | | Hindi | |
| 2024 | Article 370 | Yakub Shaikh | Hindi | |

=== Television ===
| Year | Title | Role | Language | Notes |
|---|---|---|---|---|
| 2009-2012 | Laagi Tujhse Lagan | Sudarshan | Hindi | |
| 2010 | Rishta.com | Neil | Hindi | Episode 14 |
| 2013 | Arjun | Criminal | Hindi | Episode 111 |
| 2014 | Do Dil Ek Jaan | Govind | Hindi | |
| 2015 | Agent Raghav – Crime Branch | Shubhodh Arora | Hindi | |
| 2015 | Siya Ke Ram | Akampana | Hindi | |
| 2015-2016 | Chakravartin Ashoka Samrat | Rajkumar Justin Maurya | Hindi | |
| 2016 | 24 | Gyan | Hindi | Season 2 |
| 2016-2017 | Bahu Hamari Rajni Kant | Amartya | Hindi | |
| 2017 | Peshwa Bajirao | Mughal Muhammed Kam Baksh | Hindi | |
| 2017-2018 | Baahubali: The Lost Legends | Prince Varaah | Hindi; English | voice role |
| 2018–2020 | Nazar | Nishant Sharma | Hindi | |
| 2022 | Tanaav | Umar Riaz ‘Panther’ | Hindi | |
| 2024 | Janani – AI Ki Kahani | Paresh Parmar | Hindi | |
| 2024–2025 | Tenali Rama | Girgit | Hindi | |

== Dubbing roles ==
=== Animated series ===
| Program title | Original voice(s) | Character(s) | Dub language | Original language | Number of episodes | Original airdate | Dubbed airdate | Notes |
|---|---|---|---|---|---|---|---|---|
| The Avengers: Earth's Mightiest Heroes | Lance Reddick | Sam; Wilson / Falcon | Hindi | English | 52 | 9/20/2010-5/5/2013 | | |
| Avengers Assemble | Bumper Robinson | Sam; Wilson / Falcon | Hindi | English | 50 | 8/26/2013- Current | | |
| Transformers: Robots in Disguise | Mitchell Whitfield | Fixit | Hindi | English | 71 | 14 March 2015 – 4 November 2017 | | Sumit has voiced 10 characters in the Hindi dub. |
| Transformers: Robots in Disguise | Mitchell Whitfield | Toolbox | Hindi | English | 71 | 14 March 2015 – 4 November 2017 | | Sumit has voiced 10 characters in the Hindi dub. |
| Transformers: Robots in Disguise | Khary Payton | Bisk | Hindi | English | 71 | 14 March 2015 – 4 November 2017 | | Sumit has voiced 10 characters in the Hindi dub. |
| Transformers: Robots in Disguise | Fred Tatasciore | Saberhorn | Hindi | English | 71 | 14 March 2015 – 4 November 2017 | | Sumit has voiced 10 characters in the Hindi dub. |
| Transformers: Robots in Disguise | Fred Tatasciore | Night Watchmen | Hindi | English | 71 | 14 March 2015 – 4 November 2017 | | Sumit has voiced 10 characters in the Hindi dub. |
| Transformers: Robots in Disguise | Victor Brandt | Scorponok | Hindi | English | 71 | 14 March 2015 – 4 November 2017 | | Sumit has voiced 10 characters in the Hindi dub. |
| Transformers: Robots in Disguise | Robbie Rist | Swelter | Hindi | English | 71 | 14 March 2015 – 4 November 2017 | | Sumit has voiced 10 characters in the Hindi dub. |
| Transformers: Robots in Disguise | Eric Bauza | Forth | Hindi | English | 71 | 14 March 2015 – 4 November 2017 | | Sumit has voiced 10 characters in the Hindi dub. |
| Transformers: Robots in Disguise | Eric Bauza | Major Mayhem | Hindi | English | 71 | 14 March 2015 – 4 November 2017 | | Sumit has voiced 10 characters in the Hindi dub. |
| Transformers: Robots in Disguise | Mikey Kelley | Opposing Captain | Hindi | English | 71 | 14 March 2015 – 4 November 2017 | | Sumit has voiced 10 characters in the Hindi dub. |
| The Adventures of Tintin | Colin O'Meara | Tintin (Second Dub) | Hindi | English | 39 | 2 October 1991 – 28 September 1992 | | |
| The Adventures of Tintin | Thierry Wermuth | Tintin (Second Dub) | Hindi | French | 39 | 2 October 1991 – 28 September 1992 | | |

=== Live action television series ===
| Program title | Actor(s) | Character(s) | Dub language | Original language | Number of episodes | Original airdate | Dubbed airdate | Notes |
|---|---|---|---|---|---|---|---|---|
| Stranger Things | Chris Sullivan | Benny Hammond | Hindi | English | 17 | 15 July 2016 – present | | |
| Seven and Me | Flavio Parenti | Marco White | Hindi | English | 26 | 28 October 2016 – present | | |
| The Crown | Daniel Ings | Mike Parker | Hindi | English | 20 | 4 November 2016 – present | | |
| Happy! | Collin Smith | Barman | Hindi | English | 8 | 6 December 2017 – present | | |
| Happy! | Jon Berry | Brent Baker | Hindi | English | 8 | 6 December 2017 – present | | |

=== Live action films ===
==== Hollywood films ====
| Film title | Actor | Character | Dub language | Original language | Original Year Release | Dub Year Release | Notes |
|---|---|---|---|---|---|---|---|
| Resident Evil | Unknown actor | Unknown character (Second Dub) | Hindi | English | 2002 | 2010 | |
| Inception | Dileep Rao | Yusuf (First Dub) | Hindi | English | 2010 | 2010 | In early 2013, UTV Software Communications produced a second Hindi dub for UTV Action due to a policy implemented, even though Main Frame Software Communications is owned by the same company that made the original Hindi dub that Sumit participated in. |
| The Smurfs | John Oliver | Vanity Smurf (voice) | Hindi | English | 2011 | 2011 | American live action film mixed with CGI animation. |
| The Smurfs 2 | John Oliver | Vanity Smurf (voice) | Hindi | English | 2013 | 2013 | American live action film mixed with CGI animation. |
| Cowboys & Aliens | Sam Rockwell | Doc | Hindi | English | 2011 | 2011 | |
| Battleship | Unknown actor | Unknown character | Hindi | English | 2012 | 2012 | |
| Premium Rush | Unknown actor | Unknown character | Hindi | English | 2012 | 2012 | |
| Olympus Has Fallen | Unknown actor | Unknown character | Hindi | English | 2013 | 2013 | |
| The Wolverine | Unknown actor | Unknown character | Hindi | English | 2013 | 2013 | Performed alongside Shakti Singh who voiced Hugh Jackman as Logan / Wolverine in Hindi. |
| The Amazing Spider-Man 2 | Marton Csokas | Ashley Kafka | Hindi | English | 2014 | 2014 | Sumit has voiced 2 characters in the Hindi dub. |
| The Amazing Spider-Man 2 | J. D. Walsh | Dr. Jallings | Hindi | English | 2014 | 2014 | Sumit has voiced 2 characters in the Hindi dub. |
| RoboCop | Jordan Johnson-Hinds | Jerry White | Hindi | English | 2014 | 2014 | Performed alongside Aaditya Raj Sharma who voiced Joel Kinnaman as Alex Murphy / Robocop, Samay Raj Thakkar who voiced Michael Keaton as Raymond Sellers, Vinod Kulkarni who voiced Patrick Garrow as Antoine Vallon, Mayur Vyas who voiced Michael K. Williams as Jack Lewis, Manoj Pandey who voiced Jackie Earle Haley as Rick Mattox and Amar Babaria who voiced K.C. Collins as Andre Daniels in Hindi. |
| Star Wars: The Force Awakens | Domhnall Gleeson | General Hux | Hindi | English | 2015 | 2015 | |
| Star Wars: The Last Jedi | Domhnall Gleeson | General Hux | Hindi | English | 2017 | 2017 | |
| Star Wars: The Rise of Skywalker | Domhnall Gleeson | General Hux | Hindi | English | 2019 | 2019 | |
| Captain America: Civil War | Chadwick Boseman | T'Challa / Black Panther | Hindi | English | 2016 | 2016 | Performed alongside Manish Wadhwa who voiced Sebastian Stan as Bucky Barnes / Winter Soldier and Anuj Gurwara who voiced Anthony Mackie as Sam Wilson / Falcon in Hindi. Viraj Adhav dubbed this role in next movies. |
| The Finest Hours | Casey Affleck | Ray Sybert | Hindi | English | 2016 | 2016 | Performed alongside Manish Wadhwa who voiced Chris Pine as Bernard "Bernie" Webber in Hindi. |
| Spider-Man: Homecoming | Martin Starr | Mr. Harrington | Hindi | English | 2017 | 2017 | |
| Logan | Stephen Merchant | Caliban | Hindi | English | 2017 | 2017 | Performed alongside Shakti Singh who voiced Hugh Jackman as Logan / Wolverine in Hindi. |
| War Machine | Anthony Hayes | Lieutenant Commander Pete Duckman | Hindi | English | 2017 | 2017 | |
| XXX: Return of Xander Cage | Nicky Jam | Lazarus | Hindi | English | 2017 | 2017 | Performed alongside Sharad Kelkar who voiced Vin Diesel as Xander Cage in Hindi. |
| The Fate of the Furious | Scott Eastwood | Eric; Reisner / Little Nobody | Hindi | English | 2017 | 2017 | Performed alongside Shailendra Pandey who voiced Vin Diesel as Dominic Toretto in Hindi. |
| Pacific Rim: Uprising | Scott Eastwood | Nate Lambert | Hindi | English | 2018 | 2018 | Performed alongside Manoj Pandey who voiced John Boyega as Jake Pentecost in Hindi. |
| Deadpool 2 | Ryan Reynolds | Wade Wilson / Deadpool | Hindi | English | 2018 | 2018 | An extended cut (super duper cut) of the film was released in August, in which Sumit dubbed this character. |
| The Predator | Boyd Holbrook | Quinn McKenna | Hindi | English | 2018 | 2018 | |
| Venom | Riz Ahmed | Carlton Drake / Riot | Hindi | English | 2018 | 2018 | Performed alongside Chetanya Adib who voiced Tom Hardy as Eddie Brock, Samay Raj Thakkar who voiced Venom and Neshma Chemburkar who voiced Michelle Williams as Anne Weying in Hindi. |
| Fantastic Beasts: The Crimes of Grindelwald | Callum Turner | Theseus Scamander | Hindi | English | 2018 | 2018 | Performed alongside Rajesh Shukla who voiced Eddie Redmayne as Newt Scamander and Aaditya Raaj who voiced Dan Fogler as Jacob Kowalski in Hindi. |
| The Night Comes for Us | Revaldo | Yohan | Hindi | Indonesian; English; Mandarin; Cantonese | 2018 | 2018 | |
| Triple Frontier | Oscar Isaac | Santiago "Pope" Garcia | Hindi | English | 2019 | 2019 | |
| Aladdin | Billy Magnussen | Prince Anders | Hindi | English | 2019 | 2019 | |
| Always Be My Maybe | Randall Park | Marcus Kim | Hindi | English | 2019 | 2019 | |
| Christopher Robin | Ewan McGregor | Christopher Robin | Hindi | English | 2018 | 2019 | |

==== Indian films ====
| Film title | Actor | Character | Dub language | Original language | Original Year Release | Dub Year Release | Notes |
|---|---|---|---|---|---|---|---|
| Bruce Lee: The Fighter | Ram Charan | Karthik alias Bruce Lee alias IB Officer Vikram Kumar | Hindi | Telugu | 2015 | 2016 | |
| Baadshah | Brahmaji | Pilli Ramakrishna Simha | Hindustani | Telugu | 2013 | 2022 | |
| Power | Brahmaji | Sub-inspector Venkat | Hindi | Telugu | 2014 | 2015 | |
| Jagame Thandhiram | Kalaiyarasan | Deepan | Hindi | Tamil | 2021 | 2021 | |
| Ala Vaikunthapurramuloo | Brahmaji | Sudharshanam (Sudhir Sharma in Hindi version) | Hindi | Telugu | 2020 | 2022 | |

=== Animated films ===
| Film title | Original Voice(s) | Character(s) | Dub language | Original language | Original Year release | Dub Year release | Notes |
|---|---|---|---|---|---|---|---|
| Kung Fu Panda 2 | Danny McBride | Wolf Boss | Hindi | English | 2011 | 2011 | Performed alongside Prasad Barve who voiced Jack Black as Po and Kishore Bhatt who voiced Gary Oldman as Lord Shen in Hindi. |
| Epic | Pitbull | Bufo | Hindi | English | 2013 | 2013 | |
| Turbo | Unknown voice actor | Unknown character | Hindi | English | 2013 | 2013 | |
| How to Train Your Dragon 2 | Kit Harington | Eret | Hindi | English | 2014 | 2014 | Sumit's name was mentioned in the Hindi dubbing credits of the DVD release. |
| How to Train Your Dragon: The Hidden World | Kit Harington | Eret | Hindi | English | 2019 | 2019 | |
| Lego Marvel Super Heroes: Avengers Reassembled | Bumper Robinson | Sam; Wilson / Falcon | Hindi | English | 2015 | 2015 | |
| Lego Jurassic World: The Indominus Escape | Sendhil Ramamurthy | Simon Masrani | Hindi | English | 2016 | 2016 | |
| The Boss Baby | Jimmy Kimmel | Ted Templeton | Hindi | English | 2017 | 2017 | Performed alongside Pawan Kalra who voiced Alec Baldwin as Theodrey Lindsey Templeton / Boss Baby in Hindi. |

== See also ==
- List of Indian dubbing artists
