= Appurv Gupta =

Indian stand up comedian

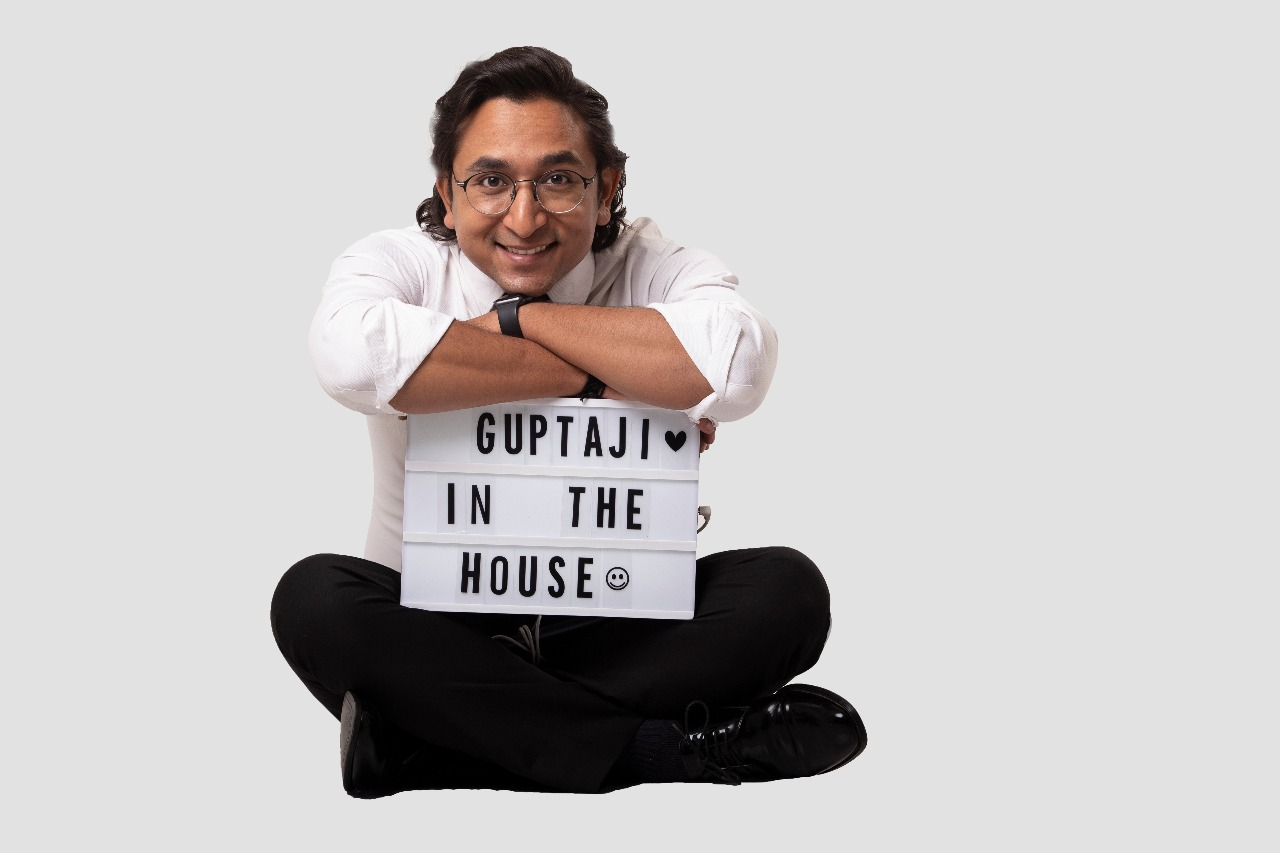
- Appurv Gupta
- Born: May 20, 1994 (age 32); New Delhi
- Education: Jaypee Institute of Information Technology, Noida
- Occupations: Stand-up comedian; satirist; YouTuber
- Years active: 2012–present
- Organization: Oriole Entertainment

YouTube information
- Channel: Appurv Gupta
- Genre: Comedy
- Subscribers: 530 thousand
- Views: 97.4 million
- Last updated: 4 August 2026
- Website: orioleentertainment.com

Appurv Gupta is an Indian Hinglish stand-up comedian and satirist.

== Early life ==
Gupta was born in Delhi to an engineer father and a homemaker mother. He completed his schooling from a government school and graduated in engineering from Jaypee Institute of Information Technology, Noida. Engineering, as a field of education, did not interest him, but he pursued it to fulfill his parents' wish.

== Career ==
After graduating, Gupta started performing at Toastmasters International. He has performed in more than 1000 shows in India and abroad since then, including corporate performances for Airtel, Tanishq, Adobe, Amex and Radio Mirchi, IIT Delhi, IIT Kharagpur, IIT Kanpur and IIT Jodhpur. He has written three solo shows: Appurview; RelationShip Or RelationShit; and Laugh with an Engineer 2.0, which has garnered over 10 million views on social media. His most applauded act is Appurview - Laugh with an Engineer which describes life from the point-of-view of an engineer. Gupta's comedy is based on self-deprecating humour, evident from various ‘baniya’ jokes with none on ‘Sardar’. He started a web series, "Mudde Ki baat", which covered topics such as start ups in India, cricket, Bollywood, and Chetan Bhagat.

In 2023, he starred in the film "Afwaah". In interviews, Gupta said he was glad not to be typecast as a comedian in the film. After the release of "Afwaah", Gupta commented that he is very careful not to spread information that he cannot verify through an official source.

== Accolades ==
Gupta was ranked second in "Top 20 Indian stand-up comedian in 2014" by CNN-IBN, and was included in the Forbes India 100 Celebrity nominees list of 2015 by Forbes India.

== Other endeavors ==
Gupta endeavors to be an entrepreneur. He has invested in Nimo Planet, Ohi, HYPD, Clapingo, Culture X, ElecBits, and The Confidento.

In 2018, he gave a TEDx Talk, the theme of which was "don't follow your passion, let the passion follow you". The video has not yet been translated into English.

During COVID-19, he was one of several prevalent Indian influencers who used social media posts to help arrange remedies for those in India needing medical aid.
