= Sayoneee =

Indian romantic drama television series

- Genre: Slice of life Drama; Romance
- Created by: Ravi Dubey; Sargun Mehta
- Based on: Mazha Thorum Munpe by Joycee
- Developed by: Joycee
- Directed by: Uttam Ahlawat
- Starring: Rashami Desai; Jahnavi Soni; Gautam Vig
- Theme music composer: Ripul Sharma
- Opening theme: "Dil Musafir Hai Hain Maana" by Ripul Sharma and Parikshit Uniyal; Lyrics: Ripul Sharma
- Country of origin: India
- Original language: Hindi
- No. of seasons: 1
- No. of episodes: 50

Production
- Producers: Ravi Dubey; Sargun Mehta
- Camera setup: Multi-camera
- Running time: 20 minutes
- Production company: Dreamiyata Entertainment

Original release
- Network: StarPlus
- Release: 23 September 2026 – present

Related
- Mazha Thorum Munpe

Sayoneee (transl. O my beloved) is an Indian Hindi-language romantic family drama television series that premiered on 23 September 2026 on Star Plus and streams digitally on JioHotstar. Produced by Ravi Dubey and Sargun Mehta under the banner of Dreamiyata Entertainment, it is an official remake of Malayalam TV series, Mazha Thorum Munpe of Asianet and stars Rashami Desai, Ajay Chaudhary, Jahnavi Soni and Gautam Vig in prominent roles.

== Plot ==
The story centres on little Saanvi, an optimistic and cheerful girl who has been raised in an orphanage. She lives with the painful void of not knowing her real family, completely unaware that her biological mother is alive. Her ultimate dream is to one day find her mother and experience the maternal warmth she has always craved.Her mother, Maya, is a powerful but heavily layered woman living with deep mysteries and unhealed emotional wounds. When fate finally crosses their paths and orchestrates a reunion between the long-lost mother and daughter, they do not find an easy happy ending. Instead, a rigid past promise stands as the absolute biggest roadblock, threatening to tear their lives apart and challenging the unbreakable bond between them.

== Cast ==
=== Main ===
- Jahnavi Soni as Saanvi Brar: Maya's daughter; Kabir's stepdaughter; Yuvraj, Simran and Tanvik's half-sister (2026–present)
  - Gurmehar Kaur as young Saanvi (2026)
  - Amayra Sharma as child Saanvi (2026)
- Rashami Desai as Maya Brar Singh: Co-owner of Velvet Fashion House; Rajdeep and Sukhmani's elder daughter; Anita's sister; Kabir's wife; Saanvi, Yuvraj, Simran and Tanvik's mother (2026–present)
- Gautam Vig as Aditya Virk: Co-owner of Velvet Fashion House; Madhuri's elder son; Aryan's brother (2026–preseny)
- Ajay Singh Chaudhary as Advocate Kabir Singh: Maya's husband; Yuvraj, Simran and Tanvik's father; Saanvi's stepfather (2026–present)

=== Recurring ===
- S. M. Zaheer as Rajdeep Brar: Sukhmani's husband; Maya and Anita's father; Saanvi, Yuvraj, Simran, Harsh, Ruhi and Tanvik's grandfather (2026) (Dead)
- Sushma Prashant as Sukhmani Brar: Rajdeep's widow; Maya and Anita's mother; Saanvi, Yuvraj, Simran, Harsh, Ruhi and Tanvik's grandmother (2026–present)
- Sachin Sharma as Yuvraj Singh: Maya and Kabir's elder son; Simran and Tanvik's brother; Saanvi's half-brother (2026–present)
- Siddhi Rathore as Simran "Simmi" Singh: Maya and Kabir's daughter; Yuvraj and Tanvik's sister; Saanvi's half-sister (2026–present)
- Rishan Verma as Tanvik Singh: Maya and Kabir's younger son; Yuvraj and Simran's brother; Saanvi's half-brother (2026–present)
- Ujala V Baboria as Anita Brar: Rajdeep and Sukhmani's younger daughter; Maya's sister; Harsh and Ruhi's mother (2026–present)
- Manseerat Sandhu as Ruhi: Anita's daughter; Harsh's sister (2026–present)
- Kimmy Kaur as Madhuri Virk: Aditya and Aryan's mother (2026–present)
- Sidhaant Mandhyn as Aryan Virk: Madhuri's younger son; Aditya's brother (2026–present)
- Jayshree Arora as Indira aka Mataji: Saanvi's foster-mother (2026) (Dead)
- Raman Dhagga as Baljit: Malani's husband; Jaspreet's father; Ritu's foster father (2026–present)
- Shefali Rana as Malani: Baljit's wife; Jaspreet's mother; Ritu's foster mother (2026–present)
- Rahul Oberoi as Jaspreet: Baljit and Malani's late son (2026–present)
- Ridhima Rampal as Ritu: Saanvi's foster sister in orphanage; Baljit and Malani's foster daughter (2026–present)
- Taysha Maini as Pinky (2026)
- Malika as Preeti (2026)
- Ashka Panchal as Geeti (2026)
- Preeti Singh as Mrs. Sethi (2026)
- Rohit Handa as

== Production ==
=== Development ===
The series is based on the novel, Mazha Thorum Munpe by Joycee which is remade into a television series by the same name.

=== Casting ===
Rashami Desai was signed to play Maya, marking her return to fiction television after a 8-year break and Jahnavi Soni was cast as her on-screen daughter. Gautam Singh Vig was signed to play male lead, Aditya.

=== Release ===
The first promo featuring Jahnavi as Saanvi and Rashami as Maya was released on 13 July 2026. The second promo announcing the launch date was released on 2 September. Sayoneee premiered on 23 September 2026 replacing Sairaab at 7.30 p.m. slot.

=== Filming ===
The series was mainly filmed in Chandigarh.
