= Afwaah =

2023 Indian film by Sudhir Mishra

- Theatrical release poster
- Directed by: Sudhir Mishra
- Written by: Screenplay: Sudhir Mishra; Nisarg Mehta; Shiva Bajpai; Dialogues: Sudhir Mishra; Apurva Dhar Badgaiyann; Nisarg Mehta
- Story by: Sudhir Mishra
- Produced by: Anubhav Sinha
- Starring: Nawazuddin Siddiqui; Bhumi Pednekar; Sumeet Vyas; Sharib Hashmi
- Cinematography: Mauricio Vidal
- Edited by: Atanu Mukherjee
- Music by: Songs: Shamir Tandon; Background Score: Karel Antonin
- Production company: Benaras Media Works
- Distributed by: AA Films (India); Reliance Entertainment (International)
- Release date: 5 May 2023
- Running time: 126 minutes
- Country: India
- Language: Hindi

Afwaah (transl. Rumour) is a 2023 Indian Hindi-language mystery thriller film written and directed by Sudhir Mishra. Produced by Anubhav Sinha and Bhushan Kumar under their respective banners Benaras Media Works and T-Series Films, the film stars Nawazuddin Siddiqui, Bhumi Pednekar, Sharib Hashmi, Sumit Kaul and Sumeet Vyas. The film was released on 5 May 2023.

== Plot ==
Rahab Ahmed, who is presumably the NRI CEO of a telecom company, drives through a single lane desert road while a speeding convoy of motorbikes and cars headed by a local goon named Chandan pass by. Within the city of Sawalpur, a rally led by local politician, Vikram Singh "Vicky Banna", is passing through a street. A sporadic stone-pelting event starts and the rally turns back. Incidentally, the Muslim neighborhood and the goons of the politician clash resulting in the terrifying death of a butcher behind a closed shop at the hands of Vikram's right-hand man Chandan.

During a lecture series, Rahab gives a talk that he came back to India because he would like to contribute here and did not feel at home in the U.S.A.

Next day, Vicky's fiancée Nivedita "Nivi" Singh has a heated altercation and accuses him of being a coward and being complicit in the violence. An irate Vicky pushes Nivi away as he gets a call from Nivi's father, Gyan Singh, who is presumably the leader of the political party. He advises Vicky to get rid of Chandan but Vicky argues that Chandan has been with them since Vicky's father's time. Gyan Singh calls a local police officer and tells him to kill Chandan. Gyan Singh next calls Nivi as he tries to explain all the political scheming to her daughter but she hangs up and smashes a picture of him in anger. Chandan calls Vicky and tells him that he is at Vicky's farmhouse and laying low for a while.

Vicky goes to meet the local police officer, Inspector Sandeep Tomar, who informs him that Chandan already has had previous complaints and that he has to die and Vicky should think of his future political career instead. Vicky gives up Chandan's location to Tomar.

Rahab drives to his wife Nandita who is in a Literature Fest in Nahargarh Fort. Meanwhile, Vicky reaches home to find that Nivi ran away from the house leaving a letter explaining that she does not want any part in the family politics. Due to congestion on the highway, Rahab has to take a change in route via Sawalpur. Vicky's goons locate Nivi while she was fleeing but is still in Sawalpur. Incidentally, while Vicky and his goons try to convince and hard-hand Nivi in a public space, Rahab passes by and ends up helping her escape the goons in his car. An ensuing car chase follows but they get them off their tail as their car falls in a ditch. Rahab accompanies Nivi as they make their way to Nivi's friend, Saif's place and she explains that he needs to come with her else the goons will kill him if they find him.

Tomar tries to assassinate Chandan but kills a farmhouse worker instead who falls inside a water ditch. Chandan sees all this and runs away scared. Nivi and Rahab make their way to her friend's house as she explains that she is running away from her home and does not want to marry Vicky. Vicky receives a false confirmation from Tomar that Chandan has been terminated.

Gyan Singh sends a social media manipulator to Vicky who explains that he can circulate fake news that Nivi and Rahab have fled together and that it is a case of "love jihad" in order for them to be easily traceable as people might help them in their search. Chandan calls Vicky's closest goon, Jay, informing that someone is trying to kill him. Jay tells him to flee towards another city called Doli. Nivi and Rahab reach Saif's house as he informs them that Section 144 has been imposed on the city due to religious unrest and clashes due to the fake "love jihad" story. Vicky watches as the fake story becomes viral and panics. Rahab leaves Nivi as he wants to get back to Nahargarh despite the circumstances and wants to collect his belongings from the car so that he can be on his own way. The goons find the car first and at the same time he learns about the "love jihad" conspiracy.

The sister of the person killed in the farmhouse (whose name is Santosh) finds the dead body and informs the police but a female police officer tries to gaslight her and cover for Tomar's fault. Chandan gets a lift from a random Muslim truck driver who is also driving towards Doli and has a fleeting but interesting conversation about kidney regeneration that the driver's doctor had told him about (that he can keep donating kidneys because they regenerate).

Rahab goes back to Saif but Saif leaves Nivi and Rahab with a motorbike and asks them to leave. Nivi says that Rahab needs to stick with her else he might be killed. They make their way towards Nahargarh as he wants to go to Nandita's book signing event. Saif's father, believing the fake news, informs Vicky, who arrives at Saif's house but doesn't find them and, at the same time, receives a call from Chandan from the truck learning about his whereabouts. Vicky meets Tomar and gives him another chance to terminate Chandan. Tomar gives orders to the female police officer to kill the sister of the dead farmhouse person to remove any witness.

Nivi and Rahab reach a blocked road and leave the motorbike and run to join a crowd of people fleeing the clashes to a warehouse where they see the goons also enter. They make a run for it again and make their way through a highway and find the butcher's family members who are also leaving Sawalpur who plead to Nivi to not inform Vicky or Gyan Singh about their temporary stop fearing further persecution. Nivi is disheartened and Rahab reveals that he came to India because he was scared by aggressive behavior of nationalist fanatics he encountered in the U.S. and not because of his benevolent tendencies. One of Vicky's cowardly and clumsy goons finds them on the highway and shoots Nivi unintentionally in a clumsy handling of the gun and rides off.

Tomar intercepts Chandan's truck but Chandan escapes. The goon who shot Nivi calls Chandan to inform about his mishap and that she might be taken to the nearest Agarwal Hospital on the highway. Chandan asks this clumsy goon if he knows why Tomar is behind him, to which he replies that he had overheard Tomar and Vicky talking about him. Chandan picks up the hint that Vicky might have been annoyed at him. The female police officer who has been tracking Tomar catches up to him. Tomar asks her if she took care of the sister to which she gives an off-hand reply and then helps him chase Chandan instead.

Rahab brings Nivi to the Agarwal Hospital and finds a Doctor,who happens to be his acquaintance to get help quickly. Tomar calls Vicky and asks him to send all his goons to follow the truck Chandan had escaped on. Instead Vicky asks his social media manipulator to spread another fake news that the truck is smuggling beef. Just as Nivi's operation is over, Vicky's goons and Chandan reach the hospital at the same time. Chandan shoots the goons and helps a still injured Nivi and Rahab flee towards Nahargarh in the “beef-smuggling” truck in return for Nivi's to vouch for his life to Vicky.

One of the living goons informs Vicky about the hospital incident and Vicky rushes to the hospital. Vicky learns that Chandan, Nivi and Rahab have left on the truck towards Nahargarh. Vicky calls the social media manipulator to undo the "beef-smuggling" truck fake news. The manipulator and his team flee hearing this, leaving. Frustrated, Vicky calls Tomar to intercept the truck on its way to Nahargarh.

Rahab makes a video of Nivi telling her part of the story counteracting the fake news but owing to it being a video it does not get completely uploaded to Twitter (not X yet) due to poor network in the remote roads of Rajasthan. Rahab also gets the "beef-smuggling" truck message and they take a diversion stop and look at the trailing lights of bikes that are trying to find them.

As they reach the entrance of the Nahargarh Fort, the gates are closed as security forces and the manager of the event, all believing in the fake news, deny them entry. Rahab calls Nandita inside who is also unable to convince the managers about Rahab's innocence. As Rahab pleads outside, the situation tenses. Vicky reaches the entrance of the gate and orders Chandan to kill Rahab banging at the gate of the fort. Chandan being scared of Vicky follows and stabs Rahab and his phone falls on the ground with the video being completely uploaded to Twitter. Rahab kicks Chandan and runs away bleeding. Vicky drives away with Nivi in the truck. Rahab is chased by Chandan, who is shot by a pursuing Tomar and killed. Vicky halts to a stop in front of a mob who identify the "beef-smuggling" truck. Nivi hugs Vicky and the mob misunderstands Vicky to be Rahab, mercilessly beating him up. Tomar wants to shoot Nivi but the female police officer stops him and blackmails him to follow her orders revealing that she has kept Santosh's sister alive.

Rahab reaches the performance stage of the Lit Fest as the show ends and Nandita rushes to help him. Later police find out that the "beef-smuggling" truck was full of donkeys.

A post-credit scene shows Rahab recovering from this stab injury. Nivi stands for election instead of Vicky with the female police officer and Jay behind her and Rahab is seen far in the crowd. Rahab returns to his home and finds it charred.

== Cast ==
- Nawazuddin Siddiqui as Rahab Ahmed
- Bhumi Pednekar as Nivedhita "Nivi" Singh
- Sharib Hashmi as Chandan Singh
- Sumit Kaul as Inspector Sandeep Tomar
- Sumeet Vyas as Vikram Singh (Vicky Bana)
- Appurv Gupta as Bobby
- TJ Bhanu as Riya Rathod
- Eisha Chopra as Nandita Ahmed (Rahab's wife)
- Rockey Raina
- Kaviraj Laique
- Krishan Bhargav as Imtiaz
- Jahnavi Soni as Santosh's sister

== Production ==
The film was announced on 17 February 2022. Principal photography commenced on 21 June 2022 in Jodhpur, Rajasthan.

== Reception ==
On the review aggregator website Rotten Tomatoes, 82% of 11 critics' reviews are positive, with an average rating of 7.3/10.

Saibal Chatterjee of NDTV praised the film and gave it four out of five stars, describing Afwaah as an indictment of politics that thrives on building divides amongst communities. While its blows aren't always stinging, the film chooses its targets and sides wisely, and it isn't afraid to go all-in on its hatred for forces that thrive in troubled waters. The film is positioned as being based on a real-life incidents, while the reliability of the statistics shown are not backed by any real evidence.

Anna MM Vetticad of Firstpost gave 3.5 stars out 5, and she stated that this film is about how a resourceful individual or group may spread a lie like wildfire on social media, exploiting the public's confirmation bias towards the underprivileged - religious minorities, women, anybody - until that deception is accepted as the truth. Afwaah is riveting cinema. Riveting and incredibly relevant.

Subhash K. Jha praised the film and write in revies that Sudhir Mishra's long-awaited new thriller Afwaah is a daring new thriller. It appears to be one of Mishra's most fascinating works to date. "It emphasises current issues, but there is [a] core of universality in the storytelling, in the structuring, where characters are caught in a situation created by a rumour."

Mayank Shekhar of Mid-Day gave 3.5 stars out of 5, he wrote that The 124-minute picture that follows is so intent on becoming a thriller that there is little, if any, room to stage a gripping drama between the leads, or any other characters.

Archika Khurana of The Times of India also gave 3.5 stars out of 5, and stated that This film does a good job of highlighting the impact of such afwaahs; yet, the climax feels a little too convenient and might have left us with a deeper impression. "Rumour hai par phikar kise hai, phailaane wale ko na sun wale ko." This is the unfortunate reality.

Zinia Bandyopadhyay of India Today gave 3.5 stars out of five praises the direction of Mishra and she stated in her review conclusion Afwaah is a fantastic picture of what our society has lately witnessed, and maybe, via this film, rumor-mongering and blindly spreading bogus news can be reduced! At the very least, that is what we can aspire for.

Alaka Sahani of The Indian Express wrote Afwaah is a reflection of the moral depravity that has occurred in society. It causes us to sit up and take notice of the 'rise of noise,' as well as the dwindling space for debate and rational thought as intolerance renders the people gullible. Afwaah shines a light on a society full of power-hungry guys with fragile egos. They gain disciples by intimidation and deception. A woman desiring independence, on the other hand, is ridiculed. Finally, the women of Afwaah discover means to assert their autonomy.

Monika Rawal Kukreja of Hindustan Times praises the caste performance and direction and she said Watch Afwaah if you want content-driven, important films that will make you think, ask the appropriate questions, and, in certain circumstances, be encouraged to do your part to bring about constructive social change. And if you take it seriously enough, you could just use common sense the next time you encounter a gossip on social media and determine whether or not you want to trust it.

Anuj Kumar wrote in The Hindu Sudhir Mishra, the director, has a habit of heaping our plates with seemingly incongruous items that come together to give a heady supper as a hectic night fades into darkness. This week, Mishra navigates yet another terrible night in which the dawn appears far as he dissects the anatomy of afwaah (rumour) and how it spirals out of control when social media is used to manufacture false narratives and create societal divides for short-term political advantages.

Deepa Gahlot of Scroll.in praise the story and direction of the film she said that, There's always an election coming up in the twilight world of Hindi films about politics, which explains the violent mayhem that occurs. Sudhir Mishra's Afwaah has an unusually high body count for a film that has liberal hearts breaking for an innocent butcher slain during a riot. (The image of the guy pleading for forgiveness with folded hands is meant to evoke the famous photograph from the Gujarat riots.)

Pratikshya Mishra of The Quint gave 3.5 stars and stated that Afwaah suggests a world in which a mob can be incited by tweets (as we've seen), and encourages viewers to ask and probe. 'Remember to ask questions when you see information on social media,' the film advises. But the real question is whether anyone would listen above the clamour of social media alerts.

== Accolades ==
Award	Ceremony date	Category	Recipients	Result	Ref.
Filmfare Awards	28 January 2024	Best Editing	Atanu Mukherjee	Nominated	
Filmfare Awards	28 January 2024	Best Background Score	Karel Antonin	Nominated	
