= Kuldeep Singh (actor) =

Actor

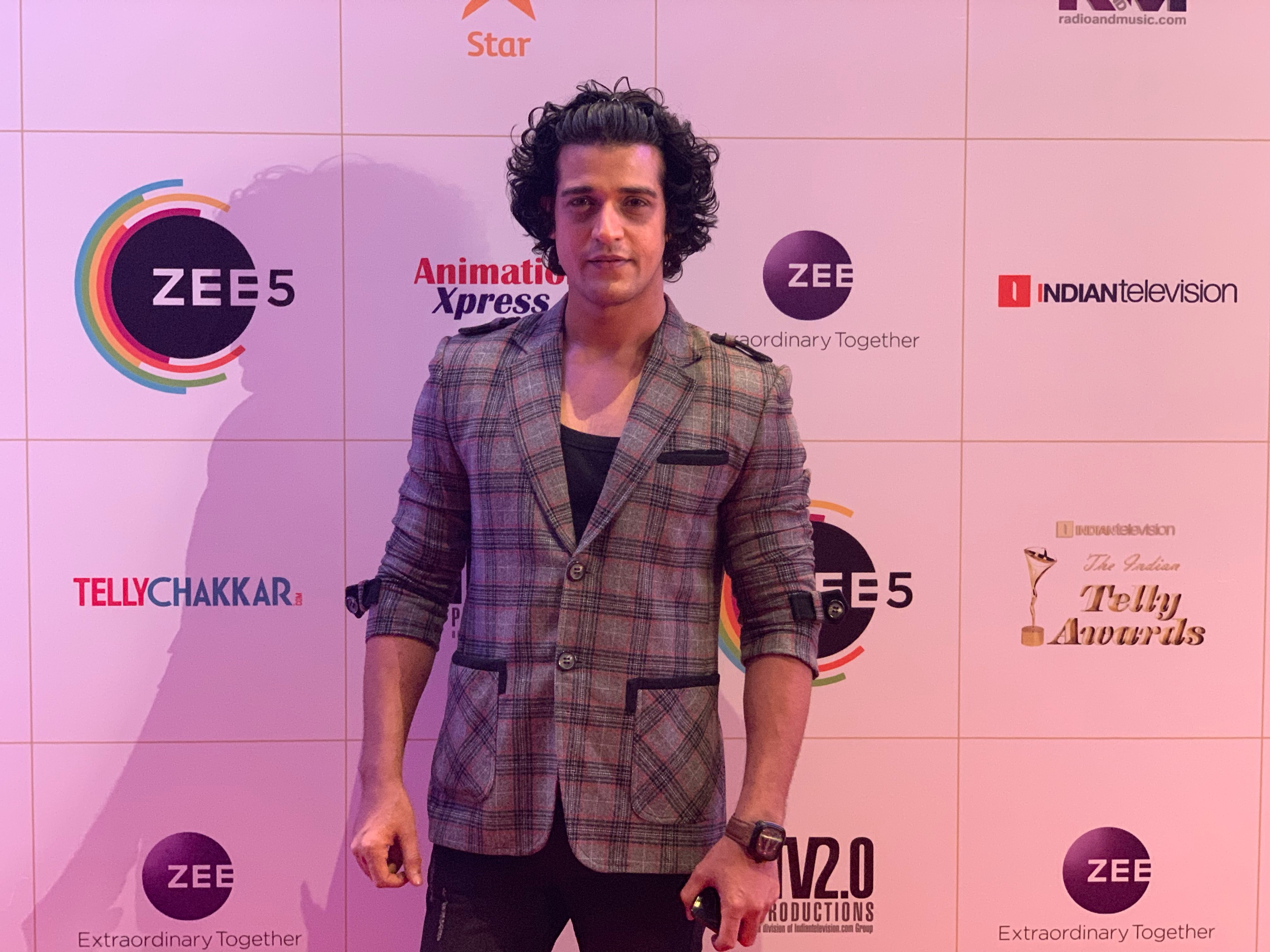
- Actor Kuldeep Singh at SBS Telebration in Mumbai (India) on 14 Dec 2018
- Born: Vickie Chaudhary; Bahadurgarh, Haryana, India
- Occupation: Actor
- Years active: 2016–present
- Known for: Vighnaharta Ganesha, Mahabharat

Vickie Chaudhary (born 17 January), known by his stage name Kuldeep Singh, is an Indian Hindi-language television actor who is best known for playing Lord Vishnu, Rama and Krishna in the mythological TV series Vighnaharta Ganesha and Bharmal in Vikram Betaal Ki Rahasya Gatha. He was also seen as Dr. Vaibhav in the police procedural series CID.

== Biography ==
Kuldeep Singh was born as Vickie Chaudhary on 17 January in Bahadurgarh, Haryana, India to Satyapal Singh and Shyam Lata. Brought up in Delhi, he completed his B.Com at Ramjas College of Delhi University. His father Satyapal Singh.

He started his acting career with Detective Wagle which aired on DD National. He initially appeared in negative role in several television series including Yeh Hai Aashiqui, Aye Zindagi, Savdhaan India. In 2017, he joined the mythological series Vighnaharta Ganesha which aired on Sony TV, and played Lord Vishnu, Rama, and Krishna. He acted in Vikram Betaal Ki Rahasya Gatha as Bharmal, CID (Indian TV series) as Dr. Vaibhav, Man Mein Hai Visshwas as Anwar, and Pyaar Tune Kya Kiya.

In July 2020, he was invited to appear in Bigg Boss (season 14), which he declined. He played role of ACP Yogi in Raisinghani v/s Raisinghani

== Filmography ==
=== Television ===
- 2013–2016 – Yeh Hai Aashiqui
- 2016 – SuperCops vs Supervillains
- 2016 – Fear Files: Darr Ki Sacchi Tasvirein
- 2016 – Man Mein Hai Visshwas as Anwar
- 2014–2015 – CID (Indian TV series) as Dr. Vaibhav
- 2014–2015 – Kaisi Yeh Yaariaan
- 2017–2020 – Vighnaharta Ganesha as Lord Vishnu
- 2018 – Vikram Betaal Ki Rahasya Gatha as Bharmal
- 2017 – Savdhaan India
- 2017 – Aye Zindagi as Aman
- 2016 – Pyaar Tune Kya Kiya
- 2023 - Laal Banarasi as Yug Sinha
- 2025 – Anupamaa as Professor Diwakar
- 2026–present – Yeh Rishta Kya Kehlata Hai as Raghav "Raghu" Damani

=== Web series ===
- 2020 – Victim as Karan
- 2024 - Raisinghani vs Raisinghani as ACP Yogesh Patkar
