= Narayani Shastri =

Indian television actress (born 1978)

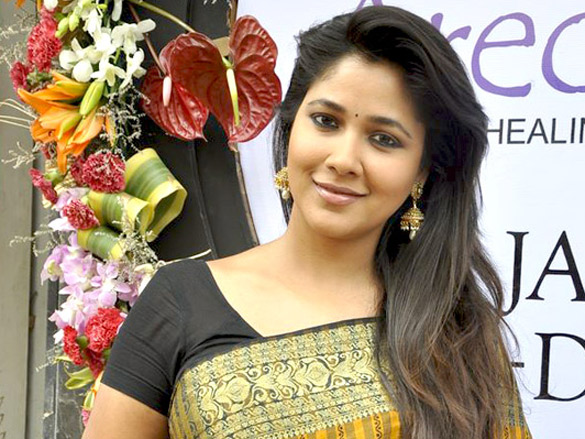
- Narayani Shastri at Areopagus Spa launch
- Born: 16 April 1978 (age 48); Pune, Maharashtra, India
- Occupations: Model; Actress
- Years active: 1996–present
- Known for: Kyunki Saas Bhi Kabhi Bahu Thi; Kohi Apna Sa; Kkusum; Piya Ka Ghar; Piya Rangrezz; Rishton Ka Chakravyuh; Aapki Nazron Ne Samjha; Laal Banarasi
- Spouse: Steven Graver (m. 2015)
- Partners: Anuj Saxena (2002–2003); Gaurav Chopra (2004–2010)

Narayani Shastri is an Indian television and theatre actress known for her roles in Kyunki Saas Bhi Kabhi Bahu Thi as Kesar Anupam Kapadia, Piya Ka Ghar as Rimjhim Avinash Sharma, Namak Haraam as Swati Karan Sehgal, Rishton Ka Chakravyuh as Satarupa Baldev Singh Aapki Nazron Ne Samjha as Rajvi Vipul Rawal and Nazar as Devika.

== Personal life ==
Shastri was in a long-term relationship with co-star Gaurav Chopra with whom she participated in Nach Baliye 2. Narayani married Steven Graver in 2015.

== Career ==
Shastri made her debut in the DD National's Kahani Saat Pheron Ki. She played the lead role in Piya Ka Ghar as Rimjhim, and replaced Neha Mehta to play Mamta in Zee TV's Mamta. Narayani played the role of Tulsi's sister Kesar in Star Plus' Kyunki Saas Bhi Kabhi Bahu Thi. She played the character Tashu, Abhay's evil wife in Sony TV's Kkusum.she played shruti in koi apnaa saa(zee tv)

In 2017, she played the role of powerful business woman Satrupa in Star Plus' show Rishton Ka Chakravyuh.

== Filmography ==
| Year | Film | Role | Notes |
|---|---|---|---|
| 1999 | Pyaar Koi Khel Nahin | Bride in Marriage | |
| 2000 | Ghaath | Varsha Khairnar | |
| 2001 | Chandni Bar | Anju | |
| 2005 | Pak Pak Pakaak | Shalu | Marathi film |
| 2008 | Mumbai Meri Jaan | Shweta | |
| 2010 | Na Ghar Ke Na Ghaat Ke | Mithilesh | |
| 2024 | Rautu Ka Raaz | Warden Sangeeta | |

=== Television ===
| Year | Serial | Role | Notes |
|---|---|---|---|
| 2000 | Kahani Saat Pheron Ki | Deepa Shekhar Sehgal | |
| 2000 | Thriller At 10 | Tina D' Costa | Episode 166 to Episode 170 |
| 2001 | Babul Ki Duwayen Leti Jaa | Jenny | |
| 2001–2002 | Kohi Apna Sa | Shruti Tushar Gill | |
| 2001–2003 | Kyunki Saas Bhi Kabhi Bahu Thi | Kesar Anupam Kapadia | |
| 2002 | Ssshhhh...Koi Hai – Anushasan | Ruby | Episode 45 |
| 2002 | Sanjivani | Patient's Wife | Episode 34 |
| 2002–2003; 2005 | Kkusum | Natasha "Tashu" Kanwar / Natasha Abhay Kapoor | |
| 2002–2006 | Piya Ka Ghar | Rimjhim Reborn Shruti Gill Sharma Avinash Sharma | |
| 2025 | Piya Ka Ghar | Megha Sharma / Koyal Twins Daughter for Narayani Shastri | |
| 2003 | Kya Hadsaa Kya Haqeeqat – Kabzaa | Aashna "Aashu" (Before Plastic Surgery) | |
| 2004 | Vikraal Aur Gabraal | Ruby | Episode 25 |
| 2006 | Twinkle Beauty Parlour Lajpat Nagar | Ranjana | |
| 2006 | CID – The Case Of Mysterious Gift | Sunanda (Episode 426) | Episodic Role |
| 2006 | Nach Baliye 2 | Contestant | Reality show |
| 2006–2008 | Sanskar | Anupama / Nandini | |
| 2007 | Aahat | Disha | Episode 7 |
| 2007 | Mamta | Mamata Akshay Srivastav | |
| 2008 | Ghar Ki Lakshmi Betiyann | Advocate Damini Verma | Cameo role; Episode 358 to Episode 365 |
| 2008 | Zara Nachke Dikha | Contestant | Reality Show |
| 2009–2010 | Namak Haraam | Swati Karan Sehgal | |
| 2010 | Meethi Choori No 1 | Contestant | Reality Show |
| 2011 | Zor Ka Jhatka: Total Wipeout | Contestant | Reality Show |
| 2012 | Phir Subah Hogi | Gulabia | |
| 2013 | Do Dil Bandhe Ek Dori Se | Guest Dancer | Episode 16 |
| 2013 | Beta Hi Chahiye | Guest Dancer | Episode 75 |
| 2013 | Arjun | Senior Inspector Lata Mane | Episode 106 |
| 2014 | The Adventures Of Hatim | Neena | Episode 61 |
| 2014 | Savdhaan India | Saroja Arvind Khattar | Episode 962 |
| 2015–2016 | Piya Rangrezz | Bhanvari Singh | |
| 2017–2018 | Rishton Ka Chakravyuh | Satarupa Baldev Singh | |
| 2018 | Juzzbaatt – Sangeen Se Namkeen Tak | Guest | Episode 15; talk show |
| 2018 | Laal Ishq | Sejal | Episode 37 |
| 2018–2019 | Karn Sangini | Radha | |
| 2019 | Nazar | Devika | Episode 152 |
| 2021 | Aapki Nazron Ne Samjha | Rajvi Vipul Rawal | |
| 2023–2024 | Dhruv Tara – Samay Sadi Se Pare | Maharani Saraswati Udaybhan Singh | |
| 2023–2024 | Laal Banarasi | Shakuntala Agarwal / Shakuntala Dushyant Sinha | |
| 2025 | Lekar Hum Deewana Dil | Priyadarshini Tripathi | |
| 2025–2026 | Noyontara | Lalita Sengupta | Dual role |
| 2025–2026 | Noyontara | Lata | Dual role |
| 2026–present | Mahadev & Sons | Bhanupriya "Bhanu" Bajpai | |

=== Web series ===
| Year | Show | Role | Notes |
|---|---|---|---|
| 2018 | Gandii Baat 1 | Preeto | |
| 2020 | Naxalbari | Sudha | |
