= Tanaav =

Indian action series

- Genre: Action; Thriller
- Based on: Fauda by Lior Raz and Avi Issacharoff
- Screenplay by: Ishan Trivedi, Sudhir Mishra
- Directed by: Sudhir Mishra; Sachin K. Krishn; E. Niwas (Season 2)
- Starring: Manav Vij; Arbaaz Khan; Danish Husain; Ekta Kaul; M. K. Raina; Rajat Kapoor; Rajesh Jais; Satyadeep Mishra; Shashank Arora; Sumit Kaul; Sukhmani Sadana; Waluscha De Sousa; Zarina Wahab; Mir Sarwar
- Composer: Karel Antonín
- Original language: Hindi
- No. of seasons: 2
- No. of episodes: 24

Production
- Executive producers: Deepak Segal; Siddharth Khaitan
- Producer: Sameer Nair
- Cinematography: Sachin K. Krishn (Season 1); Quais Waseeq (Season 2)
- Editors: Archit Damodar (Season 1); Abhishek Seth (Season 2)
- Production company: Applause Entertainment

Original release
- Network: SonyLIV
- Release: 11 November 2022

Tanaav (transl. 'Stress') is an Indian Hindi-language action thriller streaming series directed by Sudhir Mishra and Sachin Krishn. The series is created and produced by Sameer Nair under the banner of Applause Entertainment Pvt. Ltd, starring Manav Vij, Arbaaz Khan, Danish Husain, Ekta Kaul, M. K. Raina, Rajat Kapoor, Satyadeep Mishra, Shashank Arora, Sumit Kaul, Sukhmani Sadana, Waluscha De Sousa and Zarina Wahab. Tanaav is a remake of the Israeli TV series Fauda (Hebrew: פאודה), premiered on SonyLIV on 11 November 2022. The first season mentions Harkat-ul-Mujahideen, Jamaat-e-Islami Kashmir, Gulf money and moderate separatists.The first 6 episodes of the second season released on 6 September 2024.

== Premise ==
Set in 2017, the socio-political drama revolves around the conflict between state-run Special Task Group (STG) and Pakistan based terrorists in the Kashmir Valley.

== Cast ==
- Manav Vij as Kabir Farooqui
- Sukhmani Sadana as Nusrat Farooqui
- Rajat Kapoor as Jagjit Malik, bureaucrat
- Arbaaz Khan as Vikrant Rathore
- Danish Husain as Shabbir Malik
- Rajesh Jais as NSA Dheeraj Saran
- Ekta Kaul as Dr. Farah
- Sahiba Bali as Toshi Kaul
- Amit Gaur as Muneer
- M. K. Raina as Meer Saab
- Satyadeep Mishra as Udar Parimoo
- Sumit Kaul as Umar Riaz ‘Panther’
- Shashank Arora as Junaid
- Waluscha De Sousa as Zainab Riaz
- Zarina Wahab as Nabeela Riaz, Umar Riaz's mother
- Sheen Savita Dass as Fatima Ali
- Mir Sarwar as Idris Lone
- Gaurav Arora as Fareed Mir/Al Damishq (season 2)
- Rockey Raina as Bilal Ashahi
- Arslan Goni as Kunal Mattoo
- Udit Arora as Arjun Raina
- Kabir Bedi as Haider Farooqui: Kabir's father (season 2-present)
- Soni Razdan as Zubeida Mir
- Swati Kapoor as Aayat Mir
- Junaid Khan as Fahad Mir
- Zayn Khan as Ayesha Rathore
- Zamin Manzoor as Jamaal
- Khalida Jan as Zoya

== Episodes ==
| Series | Episodes | Originally released |
|---|---|---|
| 1 | 12 | 11 November 2022 |
| 2 | 12 | 6 September 2024 |

=== Season 1 (2022) ===
| No. overall | No. in season | Title | Directed by | Written by | Original release date |
|---|---|---|---|---|---|
| 1 | 1 | "Resurrection" | Sudhir Mishra | Adhir Bhat and Gagan Singh Sethi | 11 November 2022 |
| 2 | 2 | "Wounded Panther" | Sudhir Mishra | Adhir Bhat and Gagan Singh Sethi | 11 November 2022 |
| 3 | 3 | "Driven by Love" | Sudhir Mishra | Adhir Bhat and Gagan Singh Sethi | 11 November 2022 |
| 4 | 4 | "Missed Target" | Sudhir Mishra | Adhir Bhat and Gagan Singh Sethi | 11 November 2022 |
| 5 | 5 | "An Ominous Turn" | Sudhir Mishra | Adhir Bhat and Gagan Singh Sethi | 11 November 2022 |
| 6 | 6 | "An Eye for an Eye" | Sudhir Mishra | Adhir Bhat and Gagan Singh Sethi | 11 November 2022 |
| 7 | 7 | "Circle of Fire" | Sudhir Mishra | Adhir Bhat and Gagan Singh Sethi | 18 November 2022 |
| 8 | 8 | "Loss" | Sudhir Mishra | Adhir Bhat and Gagan Singh Sethi | 18 November 2022 |
| 9 | 9 | "The Beginning of the End" | Sudhir Mishra | Adhir Bhat and Gagan Singh Sethi | 25 November 2022 |
| 10 | 10 | "Undeterred" | Sudhir Mishra | Adhir Bhat and Gagan Singh Sethi | 25 November 2022 |
| 11 | 11 | "Calm Before the Storm" | Sudhir Mishra | Adhir Bhat and Gagan Singh Sethi | 25 November 2022 |
| 12 | 12 | "Chaos" | Sudhir Mishra | Adhir Bhat and Gagan Singh Sethi | 25 November 2022 |

=== Season 2 (2024) ===
| No. overall | No. in season | Title | Directed by | Written by | Original release date |
|---|---|---|---|---|---|
| 13 | 1 | "The One from Damascus" | Sudhir Mishra | N.A | 6 September 2024 |
| 14 | 2 | "Shadows of the Past" | Sudhir Mishra | N.A | 6 September 2024 |
| 15 | 3 | "Crossroads of Conflict" | Sudhir Mishra | N.A | 6 September 2024 |
| 16 | 4 | "Fractured Alliances" | Sudhir Mishra | N.A | 6 September 2024 |
| 17 | 5 | "Danger on the Horizon" | Sudhir Mishra | N.A | 6 September 2024 |
| 18 | 6 | "Echoes of Betrayal" | Sudhir Mishra | N.A | 6 September 2024 |
| 19 | 7 | "Undercover emotions" | Sudhir Mishra | N.A | 6 December 2024 |
| 20 | 8 | "Web of secrecy" | Sudhir Mishra | N.A | 6 December 2024 |
| 21 | 9 | "Love in the line of fire" | Sudhir Mishra | N.A | 6 December 2024 |
| 22 | 10 | "Threads of deception" | Sudhir Mishra | N.A | 6 December 2024 |
| 23 | 11 | "Into the darkness" | Sudhir Mishra | N.A | 6 December 2024 |
| 24 | 12 | "Point of no return " | Sudhir Mishra | N.A | 6 December 2024 |

== Marketing ==
Arbaz Khan, Waluscha De Sousa, Sudhir Mishra along with the cast promoted the web series on The Kapil Sharma Show. The cast of Tanaav also promoted the web series on Bigg Boss 16.

== Reception ==
Tanaav received mostly positive reviews from critics. Archika Khurana of The Times of India praised Tanaav as a nail-biting espionage thriller set in Kashmir that moves at a breakneck pace throughout. Grace Cyril of India Today praised the web series for a compelling plot. Deepa Gahlot of Scroll.in praised the web series for an undoubtedly gripping thriller, and having relentless pace and striking visuals. Subhash K. Jha of The Firstpost mentioned that Tanaav is a partly-haunting, partly-jolting dream-turned-nightmare drama.

Abhimanyu Mathur of Hindustan Times mentioned that the web series is well-intentioned but fails to capture nuances of Kashmir conflict. Arushi Jain of The Indian Express stated that the web series in an intriguing one. Zoya Bhatti of ThePrint praised Tanaav for cinematography, haunting background compositions, authentic Kashmiri dialogues. News18 stated that the web series is powerful and engaging.

Tanul Thakur of The Wire wrote "The series dismantles the homogeneity of the two warring camps. Not all Indian officers are alike — neither are the militants."

== See also ==
- Special OPS
- Mukhbir - The Story of a Spy
- Hostages (web series)
- Kaafir (Indian TV series)
- Baby (2015 Hindi film)
- Call My Agent: Bollywood
