= Epic Kids =

Indian Hindi-language children's TV channel

- Country: India
- Headquarters: Mumbai, Maharashtra

Programming
- Languages: Hindi; Telugu And Kannada; Malayalam; Tamil
- Picture format: 576p (SD)

Ownership
- Owner: The Epic Company
- Sister channels: Epic TV; Epic Music; Epic Bhojpuri; Epic Parivaar; Epic Bharat

History
- Launched: 14 November 2020; 5 years ago

Links
- Website: Official Website

Availability

Streaming media
- Epic ON: Watch Gubbare live

Epic Kids (formerly Gubbare TV) is an Indian multilanguage (Hindi Telugu, Kannada, Malayalam, and Tamil ) kids entertainment channel that was owned by The Epic Company. This channel targets the kids from the age of 2–12 years. The channel started broadcasting on 16 November 2020 as Gubbare Tv and on 1 April 2026 the channel rebranded to EPIC KIDS .

== Programming ==
- Akki Jaanbaaz
- Akul Nakul – The Asuras
- Atchoo
- Angry Birds Toons
- Appu – The Yogic Elephant
- Billaa Jasoos
- The Dabangg Girls
- Guru Aur Bhole
- Krishna Balram
- Kicko & Super Speedo
- Luvv Kushh
- Leo & Tig
- Fred Kismatwala
- Mighty Raju
- My Bhoot Friends
- Marcus Khiladi
- Ninja Hattori
- Paw Patrol
- Roro and Hero Bhoot Mast Zabardast
- ViR: The Robot Boy
