= Ghar Ek Mandir (TV series) =

Indian drama television series

- Genre: Indian soap opera
- Screenplay by: Kamlesh Kunti Singh, Sandip Sikcand; Dialogues: Kamlesh Kunti Singh, Rekkha Modi
- Story by: Ekta Kapoor
- Directed by: Gogi Anand, Partho Mitra
- Creative director: Doris Dey
- Starring: See below
- Opening theme: "Ye Ghar Ek Mandir Hai" by Priya Bhattacharya
- Country of origin: India
- Original language: Hindi
- No. of episodes: 360

Production
- Producers: Ekta Kapoor; Shobha Kapoor
- Running time: approximately 24 minutes
- Production company: Balaji Telefilms

Original release
- Network: Sony Entertainment Television
- Release: 24 April 2000 – 10 January 2002

Ghar Ek Mandir (transl. Home a Mandir) is an Indian television show which aired on Sony TV from 24 April 2000 to 10 January 2002. It was directed By Yatindra Rawat and produced By Balaji Telefilms and Ekta Kapoor.

== Plot ==
The show centers around a middle-class Indian family headed by Gopal, a retired school principal, his wife Gayatri and their four children. The eldest son Rajesh is married to his love Sapna and has two children - daughter Rinky and son Bunty. The middle son Prem is to be engaged to a lawyer named Aanchal. The third son is Rahul. He is a law graduate but is unable to find any good employment. He is happy-go-lucky and shirks his responsibilities. The three brothers have a younger sister Archana who is immature and materialistic. Unfortunately, Prem dies due to a bomb blast on the day of his engagement to Aanchal, leaving his mother Gayatri in a state of shock. Gayatri desires to see Aanchal as a bride. Aanchal hasn't got over Prem yet while Rahul loves a spoilt rich girl, Mala. But due to family pressure to help Gayatri recover, Rahul and Aanchal get married. They consider this marriage as a sacrifice for their family’s welfare and do not have any intimate feelings for each other. Concurrently, Archana marries Aanchal's brother Vishwajeet, an emerging writer. The lives and stories of different characters are weaved together in this show, but the focus is on how Rahul and Aanchal slowly realize they are each other's soulmates and fall in love. They even end up consummating their marriage accidentally which leads to Aanchal getting pregnant with their first child, Pratham. With the arrival of baby Pratham, Gayatri recovers completely, believing that her Prem has returned to her at last.Throughout the course of the show, Rahul transforms into a more responsible person and together with Aanchal, supports his family.

== Cast ==
=== Main characters ===
- Gautami Kapoor as Aanchal, main protagonist, lawyer, wife of Rahul
- Ram Kapoor / Ashish Kapoor as Advocate Rahul: Gopal and Gayatri's younger son; Rajesh and Prem's younger brother; Archana's elder brother; Aanchal's husband; Mala's ex–boyfriend (2000–2001) / (2001–2002)
- Shweta Kawatra as Mala Singhal, main antagonist, Aman's daughter; Siddharth's elder sister; Rahul's ex–girlfriend (2000–2001)

=== Rahul's family ===
- Madan Joshi as Gopal, retired school principal, husband of Gayatri, father of Rajesh, Prem, Rahul and Archana
- Shama Deshpande as Gayatri, wife of Gopal, mother of Rajesh, Prem, Rahul and Archana
- Kiran Karmarkar as Rajesh, eldest son of Gopal and Gayatri
- Aman Verma as Prem: Gopal and Gayatri's middle son; Rakesh's younger brother; Rahul and Archana's elder brother; Aanchal's ex–fiance (2000) (Dead)
- Kishori Shahane as Sapna, Rajesh’s wife
- Sujata Sanghamitra / Kainaaz Parvez as Archana, daughter of Gopal & Gayatri, wife of Vishwajeet
- Pramatesh Mehta as Kishan (Gopal's younger brother; Gautam and Ravi's father)
- Niyati Joshi as Suman (Kishan's wife and Ravi's mother)
- Manish Goel as Ravi
- Benika Bisht as Supriya: Ravi's girlfriend

=== Aanchal's family ===
- Rituraj Singh as Vishwajeet, Aanchal's brother and Archana's husband
- Rupa Divetia as Shanti/Maseeha, mother of Aanchal and Vishwajeet

=== Sapna's family ===
- Yamini Singh as Sapna, Megha and Vaidehi's mother
- Poornima Bhave as Megha, Sapna's 2nd sister
- Meenakshi Gupta as Vaidehi, Sapna's 3rd sister (before plastic surgery)
- Chandni Toor as Vaidehi (after plastic surgery) / Priyanka Patel
- Prakash Ramchandani as Gaurav, Vaidehi's husband
- Shilpa Mehta as Gaurav's Mother
- Neha Pendse as Sapna's youngest sister

=== Mala's family ===
- Mahesh Anand as Aman Singhal, underworld don and father of Mala and Siddharth
- Rushad Rana as Siddharth Singhal, Mala's brother
- Moonmoon Banerjee as Kittu, Siddharth's wife

=== Others ===
- Kuljeet Randhawa / Urvashi Dholakia as Anjali, Sapna’s friend, Rajesh’s boss and lover
- Tasneem Sheikh as Meenakshi, Aanchal's assistant
- Gautam Chaturvedi as Manik
- Hiten Tejwani as Gautam
- Sameer Dharmadhikari as Raghu
- Swati Anand
- Romanchak Arora as Bobby
- Nitin Trivedi as Dr. Vasudev / Govind Patel
- Rajesh Kumar as Vilas
- Pratim Parekh as Mr. Rao
- Neha Mehta as Sharon
- Aparna Bhatnagar as Damini
- Meenakshi Verma as Gautam's mother
- Kusumit Sana as Simrati Agarwal
- Manav Kaul as Abhishek
- Jahnavi Soni as Mohini
