= Rautu Ka Raaz =

2024 film by Anand Surapur

- Official release poster
- Directed by: Anand Surapur
- Written by: Anand Surapur; Shariq Patel
- Produced by: Zee Studios; Umesh KR Bansal; Anand Surapur; Chintu Srivastava
- Starring: Nawazuddin Siddiqui; Narayani Shastri; Rajesh Kumar; Atul Tiwari
- Cinematography: Sayak Bhattacharya
- Edited by: Manish Jaitly; Anand Surapur
- Music by: Sneha Khanwalkar; Zeb Bangash; Mujeeb Majeed
- Production companies: Zee Studios; Phat Phish Records
- Distributed by: ZEE5
- Release date: 28 June 2024
- Running time: 115 minutes
- Country: India
- Language: Hindi

Rautu Ka Raaz is a 2024 Indian Hindi-language mystery film directed by Anand Surapur and produced by Zee Studios along with Umesh Kr Bansal, Anand Surapur and Chintu Srivastava. The film stars Nawazuddin Siddiqui, Narayani Shastri, Rajesh Kumar and Atul Tiwari in key roles. It was featured at the 54th IFFI.

It was released over ZEE5 on 28 June 2024 to positive reviews.

== Synopsis ==
Inspector Negi takes on a case that is getting a lot of attention. The case is about the death of a man who worked at Sevadham School. This man was, in charge of taking care of the school. Inspector Negi is having trouble because of something that happened before. He is trying to find answers and follow the clues. As he looks deeper he starts to find things that are making the case more scary than he thought it would be.

== Cast ==
- Nawazuddin Siddiqui as Inspector (SHO) Deepak Singh Negi
- Narayani Shastri as Blind School Warden Sangeeta Nihau
- Rajesh Kumar as Assistant Sub-inspector Naresh Prabhakar Dimri
- Atul Tiwari as School owner Manoj Keshri
- Anoop Trevedi as Constable Rajender Tripathi
- Vicky Dutt as Head Constable Dinesh Pant
- Samridhi Chandola as Constable Lata Bisht
- Pratham Rathod as Rajat - Blind Student
- Kailash Kandwal as Principal Vishwanath Kumai
- Sandeep Sharma as C.O. Arjun Panwar
- Drishti Gaba as Diya - Blind Student
- Anil Rastogi as Home Minister
- Kruthika Pawar as Payal - Rape Victim
- Gautam Sharma as Trijugi Semwal - Asst. to Principal
- Riya Sisodiya Natasha as Music Teacher
- Parimal Aloke as Govind - Rapist
- Preeti Sood as Hema (Asst. to Warden)
- Nitinn Rana as Ashraf Jaani - Builder
- Kavita Virmani as Malini Keshri
- Harshit Verma as Tanmay Keshri
- Amit Kumar Sinha as School Watchman
- Rahul as Sikander
- Sadat as Billa
- Rashmi Sharma as Diya's Mother
- Rajender Negi as Diya's Father

== Production ==
The script of the film was developed over 10 years, and it was shot in 2022. It was initially titled Rauti Ke Beli, after the village the story is set in.

== Marketing ==
The trailer of the film was launched on 13 June 2024.

== Reception ==
Siddiqui's performance received positive reviews from critics.

Archika Khurana of The Times of India rated 3 stars out of 5 and stated that "‘Rautu Ka Raaz’ is a slow-moving murder mystery that sustains its suspenseful atmosphere, keeping viewers intrigued as the mystery unfolds." Anindita Mukherjee of India Today gave 3 stars out of 5 and said that " ‘Rautu Ka Raaz’ is a decent watch for those who love everything about hill station thrillers, cop mysteries, and, of course, Nawaz. The film has much to offer and goes beyond its stellar star cast. You won't regret it if you add it to your weekend binge-list." Nandini Ramnath of Scroll.in observes that "Rautu Ka Raaz is parodying your average police procedural." Anuj Kumar of The Hindu writes in his review "It is a departure from blood-stained, breakneck crime thrillers, director Anand Surapur’s film impresses with its ambition but flunks in probing the characters and their circumstances"

Mayur Sanap of rediff.com gave 1.5 stars out of 5 and stated that "Rautu Ka Raaz is a dragged-out slow burner of a film that just fails to ignite" A critic of Bollywood Hungama gave 2 stars out of 5 and said that "Rautu Ka Raaz has some interesting moments as well as an unpredictable climax. But the script suffers due to certain loose ends and also, it’s a film devoid of thrills and action."
