= Vikram Betaal Ki Rahasya Gatha =

Indian mythological television series

- Genre: epic
- Created by: Peninsula Pictures
- Based on: Self-created fictional stories
- Written by: C.L. Saini
- Directed by: Vaibhav mutha
- Starring: Aham Sharma; Aayam Mehta
- Country of origin: India
- Original language: Hindi
- No. of episodes: 157

Original release
- Network: &TV
- Release: 16 October 2018 – 24 May 2019

Vikram Betaal Ki Rahasya Gatha (transl. The Secret Stories of Vikram and Beta) (which is also known as Vikram-Betaal) is an Indian television epic series created by Peninsula Pictures, based on self-created fictional stories solely created for this show. The series has aired on &TV and digitally on ZEE5 platform, starring Aham Sharma and Aayam Mehta in lead roles.

== Plot ==
The story is about the life of Vikramaditya, also affectionately known as Vikram, the legendary king of Ujjaini, India. It focuses on the personal life and adventures of the great king Vikramaditya along with the stories narrated by Betaal which are mostly mythological.

No.	Tales of Betaal
1.	Three Suitors and Sonprabha
2.	The justice of Queen Bhanumati
3.	The bride's dilemma
4.	Who is the real father?
5.	The fight between Lakshmi and Bhagya
6.	Devi Sachi is reborn as Draupadi
7.	Betaal/Vishnugupt's story
8.	Why Parshuram killed his mother
9.	The test of Devi Anasuya
10.	The untold story of Shri Ram beheading himself
11.	Rishi Durvasa tests Krishna
12.	Ulupi and Arjun
13.	Rishi Agastya Creates Lopamudra
14.	Mahadev Curses Devi Parvati To Become Fisherwoman
15.	Story of Vishwamitra
16.	Story of Eklavya
17.	Why Devi Lakshmi cursed Lord Vishnu
18.	Who is responsible for Ahilya's fate
19.	A Story Of Sankat Mochan Hanuman
20.	Shri Krishna fools Asur Andhak (crossover episode with Paramavatar Shri Krishna) Episode 448 & 449
21.	The destiny of Lady Narmada
22.	Why did Mahadev behead his son-in-law?
23.	The story of 32 dolls

When Vikram couldn't answer the last question, he brought the Betaal to the palace and they together face Bhadrakaal and 32 putlis sent by him. Vikram gave Mukti to all the putlis and slew Bhadrakaal hence becoming the worthy heir of the singhasan Battisi.

== Cast ==
=== Main ===
- Aham Sharma as King Vikramaditya (2018-2019)
- Makarand Deshpande / Aayam Mehta as Betaal (2018-2019)
- Garima Parihar as Madansena (2019)
- Sooraj Thapar as Bhadrakaal (2018–2019)
- Ishita Ganguly as Rani Padmini (2018–2019)

=== Recurring ===
- Sonia Singh as Pingla (2018–2019)
- Kuldeep Singh as Bharmal (2018–2019)
- Romanch Mehta as Kalidas (2018–2019)
- Ram Awana as Senapati Viraat Sen (2018–2019)
- Amit Behl as Varahamihira (2018–2019)
- Sparsh Khanchandani as Preth Pari (2018)

=== Cameo ===
- Pratik Parihar as Pavan Dev (2019)
- Aaditya Bajpayee as Rajkumar Chandrakant (2018)
- Rohit Sharma as Rajkumar Sooryakant (2018)
- Pooja Banerjee as Rajkumari Sonprabha(2018)
- Zuber K. Khan as Raja Veerabhadra (2018)
- Saanvi Talwar as Iravati (2018)
- Arun Singh Rana as King Suryabhan (2018) / Rama (2019)
- Sarika Dhillon as
  - Sunanda (2018)
  - Devi Parvati (2019)
- Mansi Sharma as Queen Bhanumati (2018)
- Manoj Kolhatkar as Acharya Rajyogi (2018)
- Tarakesh Chauhan as Senapati of Queen Bhanumati (2018)
- Divyanganaa Jain as Rajkumari Satakshi (2018) / Mahamaya
- Shantanu Monga as Yogidutt (2018)
- Ali Merchant as Malkhan Singh (2018)
- Urvashi Sharma as Malkhan's Wife (2018)
- Sailesh Gulabani as Bhujang (2018)
- Aditi Asija as Prabhavati (2018)
- Arti Singh as Shachi / Draupadi (2018)
- Puneet Vashisht as Kaal Bhairav (2018) / Mahadev (2018; 2019)
- Preet Kaur Madhan as Renuka / Sudeha (2018)
- Yash Gera as Naagraj (2018)
- Sharhaan Singh as Bhagyadev (2018)
- Dalljiet Kaur as Devi Anasuya (2018)
- Punit Talreja as Rishi Atri (2018)
- Abhishek Gupta as Ram (2018)
- Charu Mehra as Sita (2018)
- Dinesh Mehta as Ravan (2018)
- Brownie Parashar as Vashishtha (2018)
- Ravneet Kaur as Sita (2019)
- Dheeraj Miglani as Devrishi Narada (2018)
- Riyanka Chanda as Devi Parvati (2018)
- Ravish Desai as Krishna (2019) / Vishnu (2019)
- Shagun Sharma as
  - Rukmini (2019)
  - Kashi (2019)
- Kapil Arya as Indra (2018; 2019) / Arjuna (2019)
- Keertida Mistry as Chitrāngadā (2019)
- Monica Sharma as Uloopi (2019)
- Rohit Chandel as Babruvahana (2019)
- Shakti Singh as Yudishtira (2019)
- Garima Jain as Lopamudra / Raktmanjari (2019)
- Simran Kaur as Parvati (2019)
- Arunim G Mishra as Karthikeya (2019)
- Mona Vasu as Chudail (2019)
- Rudra Soni as Ekalavya (2019)
- Sudhir Nema as Drona (2019)
- Ravi Gossain as Vashishta (2019)
- Siddharth Vasudev as Vishwamitra (2019)
- Hans Dev Sharma as Raja Janak(2019)
- Arishfa Khan as Mohana (2019)
- Shivya Pathania as Lakshmi (2019)
- Coral Bhamra as Adishakti (2019)
- Shafaq Naaz as Ahalya (2019)
- Rajeev Bharadwaj as Gautama Maharishi (2019)
- Siddharth Dubey as Hanuman (2019)
- Dolphin Dwivedi as Anjani (2019)
- Pooja Kanwal as Narmada (2019)
- Sikandar Kharbanda as Kameshwar (2019)
- Himani Sharma as Swapnasundari (2019)
- Charu Asopa as Nayantara (2019)
- Antara Banerjee as Kapalika (2019)
- Vindhya Tiwari as Kalika / Jogni (2019)
- Prerna Sharma as Kamodini (2019)
- Aanchal Khurana as Sugandha (2019)
- Viren Singh as King Somdev (2019)
- Patrali Chattopadhyay as Putli (2019)

== See also ==
- Vikram aur Betaal (1985 TV Series)
