= Baba Aiso Varr Dhoondo =

- Genre: Drama
- Created by: Raakesh Paswan
- Written by: Raakesh Paswan; Vandana Tiwari; Manoj Tripathi; Shilpa Choube; Susheel Choube; Mamta Kashyap; Raghuvir Shekhawat; Nikhilesh Sharma
- Directed by: Ismail Umar Khan
- Opening theme: "Baba Aiso Varr Dhoondo" by Sapna Awasthi
- Country of origin: India
- Original language: Hindi
- No. of episodes: 405

Production
- Producers: Nikhil Sinha, Saurabh Tewari; Abhinav Shukla
- Camera setup: Multi-camera
- Running time: 24 minutes
- Production companies: Triangle Film Company; Nautanki Films

Original release
- Network: Imagine TV
- Release: 20 September 2010 – 11 May 2012

Baba Aiso Varr Dhoondo is an Indian television series that aired on Imagine TV from 20 September 2010 to 11 May 2012. It was written by Raakesh Paswan, Vandana Tiwari, Manoj Tripathi, Shilpa Choube, Susheel Choube, Mamta Kashyap, Raghuvir Shekhawat, and Nikhilesh Sharma. It was produced by Nikhil Sinha of Triangle Film Company for first 305 and later by Saurabh Tewari and Abhinav Shukla of Nautanki Films for the remaining episodes.

== Plot ==
Bharti faces hardship because of her short height. Bharti's father, the rich Rupesh Chauhan finally finds a suitable match in the poor Murli Laal, who saves Bharti whilst she is being thrown into the air by a crowd of men at the wedding of Neelam, a friend of Bharti's. Witnessing how Murli had saved and fought for his daughter, Rupesh is impressed by Murli and decides to send a proposal to Bhansi Laal, Murli's father to accept Bharti as their daughter-in-law. He goes to the Laal family's house to invite them for a function and then tactfully blurts out that he wants to get Bharti married to Murli. On hearing that everyone in the Laal family is shocked with this, especially Murli, who is infuriated and runs back home and refuses to marry Bharti leaving Rupesh disappointed again. As days goes by, problems start to occur in the Laal family as Murli learns that he is Bhansi and Kamala's nephew, Bhansi's younger brother's youngest son whom branded him as bad luck and tried to kill him when stopped by Bhansi and Kamala as they take Murli on as their own son, upon hearing this Murli is devastated and that his younger cousin sister Veena is of age now to get married. However, they are low on money which is bothering the elders in the family. Gaushala, sister-in-law of Murli forces him to marry Bharti as she was from a rich background and could help them financially. Reluctantly, Murli agrees and the couple is married. But after the wedding the turmoil increases for Murli and Bharti with every passing day. Veena is about to marry Mridang's friend Prakash who Bharti realises isn't the right man for Veena. Hence, on her wedding day, Bharti creates a show to break off the wedding. The whole Laal family, along with Murli is upset with her. Daily fights and annoyance increases in the household making Bharti ask for a divorce.

After their divorce, Gaushala and Mridang plan to get a new bride for Murli, so they invite Jhumka, Gaushala's younger sister. Mridang and Gaushala tells Jhumka to flirt with Murli and grab his attention. But Murli isn't impressed and her actions only irk him. Gaushala's plan fails when their trick works on Dumroo, who had been smitten by Jhumka since the very first day and the two eventually fall in love. Murli finds a job in a business owned by Ramaftar, who is dangerous and abusive to people especially his wife named Sudha. Murli learns of Ramaftar's true nature when he sees Sudha being taken away to the hospital after being tortured by his boss. There he follows the people and meets Sudha who begs him to take her home with him for a few days. Murli agrees and takes her home.

Back at Murli's house, everyone argues about Sudha staying here but they come around and allow her to stay. Meanwhile, at Bharti's house, she is still determined to reveal Prakash's real face to the Laal household and asks her friend Amit for help.

Ramaftar is infuriated by Sudha eloping with Murli at his place and thinks of revenge. He tries to hurt Murli, but Sudha appears and slaps him and defeats him, cutting all ties her husband.

It is revealed that Sudha is Bharti's school friend and Bharti knew about Ramaftar and was also aware of her leaving him, staying at other place. However, little did she know it was Murli himself. Sudha had asked her several times to meet her saviour which Bharti had denied everytime until she sees Murli and Sudha together on holi when Murli was defending Sudha from Ramaftar. Heartbroken, she returns home and cries as she had assumed that the two are now a couple. Here, Sudha finds out that Murli was married to Bharti but were later divorced. When Dumroo introduces Sudha to Bharti and Murli's marriage. To clear all the misunderstandings Sudha asks Bharti to explain to Murli that they are not a couple.

After a few days Prakash's truth come towards Murli's family and Mirdang, Murli and Dumroo fight with Prakash and the whole family feel bad about mistreating Bharti and they go and apologise to her and the misunderstandings are clear with the two families.

But another chaos happens when Prakash kidnapped Bharti and Amit and threatens Murli and Rupesh Ji to give money and then after much searching the two families find Prakash and have him arrested and Murli and Bharti hug and reunite. This does stop their when Prakash gets the gun from the police and tries to shoot Murli but to save Murli Rupesh Ji intervenes to save Murli and is himself shot everyone is shocked and worried so they take him to the hospital where Rupesh Ji takes his last breaths with Bharti and Murli and the whole family then he dies.

After the death of Rupesh Ji, Murli has to take in charge of Bharti and Dhara and then Murli realises that he has fallen in love with Bharti and he announces that he wants to marry Bharti, but Bharti is unsure and is fearing about what happened the last time they were married. Eventually Bharti and everyone else agree that Murli and Bharti's wedding was wonderful and Murli and Bharti were meant for each other.

Meanwhile, Sudha, who secretly loves Murli, is a bit heartbroken but is happy for Bharti and decides to go to her brother's house. Bharti discovers Sudha's feelings for Murli and talks to her about it and Sudha says that Murli is only hers and to stay happy and she then leaves tearfully, but Bharti is unaware.

After the whole wedding motion Bharti and Murli enjoy their nuptial night together then it is the next day and it is the first day to make something for family and prepares it with a help of Murli and then takes it to the family and the whole enjoy the meal after everyone notices Sudha is not present and only Bharti knows Sudha had disappeared for good.

As the families' problems have been resolved, Jhumka and Dumroo's love story is to be completed, so Gaushala invites some singers to pray from and then when Bhansi sees the prayer realises it is his younger brother Murari and his son Kartik and daughter-in-law Ashtumi and is happy to see them and the whole family is angered especially Murli, because Murari is his father who had attempted to kill him when he was a new born baby and abandoned him, leabing him with his Bhansi chacha and Kamala chachi. Bahnsi attempts to reunite the father and son as well as him now reuniting with his younger brother after son many years and decides to let them stay in their bungalow.

== Cast ==
- Juhi Aslam as Bharti Chauhan / Laal
- Vikrant Massey as Murli Laal, Mirdang and Dumroo's youngest brother and Veena's older brother and Bhansi Laal and Kamal Laal's youngest son
- Shailesh Datar as Rupesh Chauhan, Bharati's father
- Madhavi Gogate as Dhara Chauhan, Bharati's mother
- Darpan Srivastava as Murari laal - Murli's uncle
- Meenakshi Sethi as Chimti aka Chimti Naani - mother of Gaushala and Jhumka
- Darshan Kumar as Mridang Laal
- Ashita Dhawan as Gaushala Mridang Laal
- Rahul Trivedi as Dumroo Laal, the eldest brother of Mirdang and Murli and Veena
- Tanvi Thakkar as Jhumka Dumroo Laal - Dumroo's wife
- Shailesh Gulabani as Karthik - Murli's cousin brother
- Reshmi Ghosh as Ashthami - Karthik's wife and Murli's cousin sister-in-law
- Priya Bathija as Sudha - cameo
- Nupur Alankaar as Manju - mother of Pari and Kopal
- Tabrez Khan as Vihaan Laal - Murli and Bharti's eldest son
- Raj Singh as Aditya laal - Murli and Bharti's youngest son
- Aditi Tailang as Kopal Vihaan Laal, Bharti and Murli's eldest daughter-in-law
- Shalini Sahuta as Pari Aditya Laal, Bharti and Murli's youngest daughter-in-law
- Anmol Singh as Rimjim Laal - daughter of Jumka and Dumroo Laal
- Kanika Kotnala as Jasmine Laal, daughter of Mirdang and Gaushala
- Manoj Ramola as Ashok
- Sudeep Sarangi as Sudheer
- Smita Singh as cameo
- Ram Awana as Inspector Sajjan Singh
