= Piya Ka Ghar (TV series) =

Indian drama television series

- Promotional image
- Created by: Shreya Creations Limited
- Directed by: Chander H. Bahl; Pawan Kumar Marut; Nikhil Sinha
- Creative director: Rashmi Sharma
- Starring: Narayani Shastri Double rol triple Vishal Puri
- Opening theme: "Piya Ka Ghar" by Alka Yagnik
- Country of origin: India
- No. of seasons: 3
- No. of episodes: 729

Production
- Producer: Sheel Kumar
- Running time: 22 minutes

Original release
- Network: Zee TV
- Release: 2 December 2002 – 3 February 2006

Piya Ka Ghar was a Hindi TV serial that aired on Zee TV from 2 December 2002 to 10 February 2006.

== Concept ==
The story is based on the life of a 21-year-old young girl Rimjhim who is pretty, elegant, and soft-spoken but quick-witted and full of fun. Rimjhim, who lives in a small town, dreams of marrying someone who will love and cherish her. Her childhood friend is Avinash, and their families engaged them when they were kids. However, shortly after, Avinash and his family move to Mumbai.

Years later, a grown-up Rimjhim arrives in Mumbai to reconnect with Avinash and find true love.

== Cast ==
- Narayani Shastri as
  - Rimjhim Reborn Shruti Avinash Sharma
  - Megha Sharma / Koyal (before makeover plastic surgery)
- Gargi Sharma as Megha Sharma Shweta (after plastic surgery), Rimjhim's daughter
- Vishal Puri / Sanjay Mitra as Avinash Sharma
- Alok Nath as Bhavanishankar Sharma, Avinash's father
- Suhasini Mulay / Smita Jaykar / Beena Banerjee / Suhasini Mulay as Iravati Bhavanishankar Sharma, Avinash's mother
- Sulabha Arya as Indu Sharma, Bhavani's sister
- Smita Bansal / Sonia Kapoor as Shweta Avinash Sharma, Avinash's second wife
- Kuldeep Mallik as Rakesh Sharma
- Prachi Shah as Yashoda Rakesh Sharma
- Bakul Thakkar as Prateek Sharma
- Priyanka as Kaveri Prateek Sharma
- Madhuri Dikshit / Kannu Gill as Naina: Kaveri's mother; Vishal's maternal grandmother
- Sajni Hanspal as Jayanti Sharma
- Imran Khan / Hoshang Govil as Inder: Jayanti's husband
- Kamya Panjabi as Nikki Aneja Simran
- Raj Logani as Garv Marid Megha / Koyal Original for Narayani Shastri
- Siraj Mustafa Khan as Vishal "Vicky" Sharma: Kaveri and Prateek's son; Naina's maternal grandson
- Vineeta Thakur as Esha Vishal Sharma: Raj's daughter; Vishal's wife
- Aashka Goradia as Chandni
- Vishal Kaushik as Om Sharma, Rakesh and Yashoda's elder son
- Narendra Gupta as Durgashankar Sharma, Bhavani's brother
- Kishwer Merchant / Amita Chandekar as Malini Avinash Sharma
- Rushad Rana as Sameer, Rimjhim's friend
- Hrishikesh Pandey as Dr. Anurag Gill, Rimjhim's doctor friend and Jayanti's second husband
- Gaurav Chopra as Prem Malhotra (was to be married to Megha)
- Sushmita Mukherjee as Urmila Sharma, Bhavani's daughter
- Aashish Kaul as Munna, Urmila's son
- Kamini Khanna as Munna's wife
- Achint Kaur as Amba, Rimjhim's saviour
- Aman Verma as Raj: Esha's father (2003) (Dead)
- Akhil Ghai as Rohit look Alike Avinash
- Vishal Watwani / Amit Dolawat as Soham Sharma: Yashoda and Rakesh's younger son
- Kanika Maheshwari as Manthara Sharma
- Sandeep Bhansali as Mahan Sharma Died Blem by Rimjhim Face
- Raymon Singh as Tanya Suri / Tanya Om Sharma
- Supriya Karnik as Mohini Suri, Tanya's mother
- Geetanjali Mishra as Nurse
- Kiran Bhargava as Bua Ji, Bhavanishankar's sister
- Adi Irani as Nikhil
- Phalguni Parekh as Sonia
- Kavita Kaushik
- Karan Grover
- Manini Mishra as Rajeshwari Jayanti
- Rakesh Srivastav as Maharaj
- Sunil Jaitley as Mr. Khan
