= IN10 Media Network =

Indian media and entertainment company

The EPIC Company Private Limited
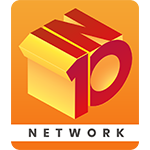
- Logo used until November 2025
- Type: Private
- Industry: Mass Media; Entertainment
- Founded: 2011; 15 years ago
- Founder: Aditya Pittie, Managing Director
- Headquarters: Mumbai, Maharashtra, India
- Area served: India
- Key people: Vivek Krishnani - President & Chief Executive Officer
- Products: Broadcasting, Films, Music,
- Website: www.epiccompany.com

The EPIC Company (formerly known as IN10 Media Network) is an Indian mass media company headquartered at Mumbai. it has interests in television, movies and businesses related to mobile content, and operates 6 channels. Led by Aditya Pittie, managing director of The Epic Company.

== Owned assets ==
=== On air channels ===
Channel	Launched	Language	Category	SD/HD availability	Notes
Epic TV	2014	Hindi	General Entertainment	SD	
Epic Parivaar	2021	Hindi	General Entertainment	SD	Formerly Ishara TV
Epic Bharat	2023	Hindi	General Entertainment	SD	Formerly Nazara TV
Epic Bhojpuri	2021	Bhojpuri	Movies	SD	Formerly Filmachi Bhojpuri
Epic Kids	2020	Hindi	Kids	SD	Formerly iSpace, Gubbare TV
Epic Music	2019	Hindi	Music	SD	Formerly ShowBox

=== Discontinued channels ===
Channel	Launched	Defunct	Language	Category	SD/HD availability	Notes
Epic TV HD	2014	2018	Hindi	Knowledge	HD	
iSpace	2016	2020	Hindi	News	SD+HD	iSpace and rebrand on 14 Nov 2020.

=== Others ===
Digital

- Epic On
- DocuBay

Production

- Epic Studios

Music

- Let's Get Louder

News

- Latestly

== Epic Studios ==
Epic Studios (formerly MovieVerse Studios and Juggernaut Productions) is a film and television production company which was established on 2019 which was owned by The Epic Company.

== Epic On ==
Epic On is an Indian subscription video on-demand over-the-top streaming service owned by The Epic Company. It was launched on 2014.

The app combines the offerings of Epic TV, Epic Parivaar (earlier Ishara TV), Epic Bharat (earlier Nazara TV) and Epic Bhojpuri (earlier Filamchi Bhojpuri). It is an on-demand video streaming platform providing entertainment and movies exclusively in Hindi and Bhojpuri language.
