= Asha Negi =

Indian actress (born 1989)

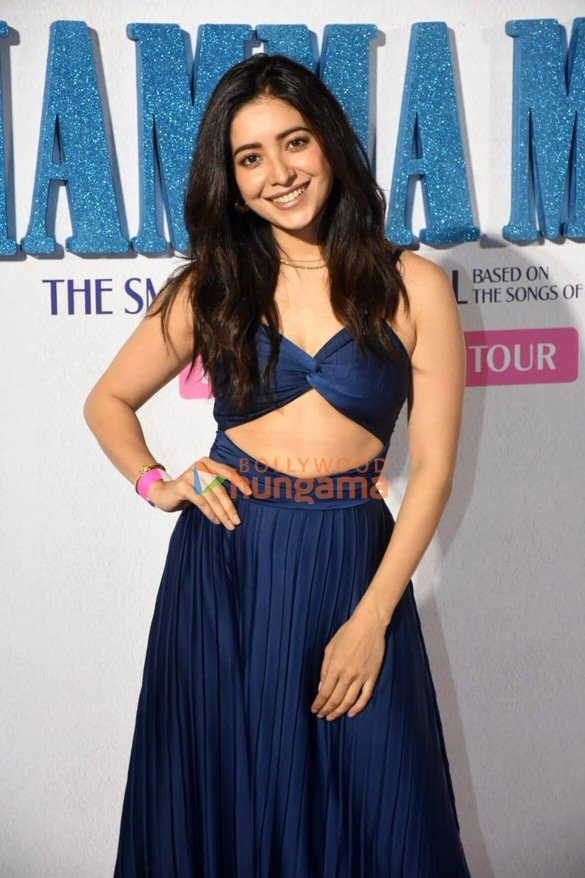
- Negi in 2023
- Born: 23 August 1989 (age 37); Dehradun, Uttarakhand, India
- Occupations: Actress; Dancer; Anchor
- Years active: 2010–present
- Partner: Rithvik Dhanjani (2013–2020)

Asha Negi (pronounced [ˈaːʃaː ˈneːɡi]; born 23 August 1989) is an Indian actress who is known for her work in Hindi television productions. She is best known for playing Purvi Deshmukh Dutt/Kirloskar in Zee TV's soap opera Pavitra Rishta and Gauravi Karmarkar in Alt Balaji's web series Baarish. She is also known for her participation in the reality show Fear Factor: Khatron Ke Khiladi 6.

In 2010, Negi debuted into television with the role of Madhura in Sapnon Se Bhare Naina and later appeared as Apeksha Malhotra in Ekta Kapoor's Bade Achhe Lagte Hain on Sony TV in 2011. She achieved her breakthrough performance in the soap opera Pavitra Rishta where she played Purvi Deshmukh from 2011 to 2014.

In 2013, she won the dance reality show Nach Baliye 6 with her Pavitra Rishta co-star and partner Rithvik Dhanjani. Her other roles were in Ek Mutthi Aasmaan as Suhana/Kalpana on Zee TV and Kuch Toh Hai Tere Mere Darmiyaan as Koyal on StarPlus. Later, she participated in Fear Factor: Khatron Ke Khiladi 6 on Colors TV. In 2019, she was featured in the web series Baarish as Gauravi Karmakar. She made her Hindi film debut with Anurag Basu's directorial Ludo, in which she played a supporting role. She also starred in the film Collar Bomb.

== Early life ==
Negi was born and raised in Dehradun, Uttarakhand to L.S. Negi and Beena Negi. In 2009, she was crowned Miss Uttarakhand 2009. She eventually moved to Mumbai to pursue an acting career.

== Personal life ==
Negi began a relationship with her Pavitra Rishta costar Rithvik Dhanjani in 2013. They later broke up in 2020 after 7 years of dating.

== Career ==
=== Early work (2009–2010) ===
Negi started her career as a model in 2009 after she won the title of Miss Uttarakhand 2009 during her college days. She appeared in various advertisements for companies and did many photo shoots. Later she auditioned for her first TV show in 2010 with the StarPlus show Sapnon Se Bhare Naina playing the role as Madhura. In 2011, Negi appeared on the Balaji Telefilms series Bade Achhe Lagte Hain, where she played the negative role Apeksha Malhotra. She has acknowledged the show as a great experience and has cited lead actress Sakshi Tanwar as her inspiration.

=== Career breakthrough (2011–2014) ===
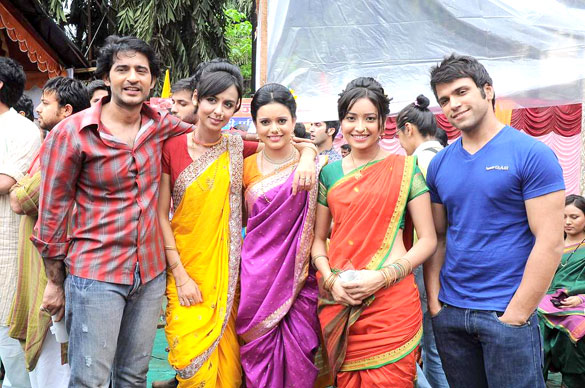
Negi on the sets of Pavitra Rishta in 2012

Her first main role was in 2011 when she was cast in part in Zee TV's Pavitra Rishta opposite Shakti Arora and Rithwik Dhanjani as the intelligent, beautiful and determined Purvi Desmukh, the adopted daughter of Archana Deskmukh (Ankita Lokhande). She has won the stellar performer of the year in Gold Awards and was awarded the popular favourite Jodi at Zee Rishtey awards. Negi has also won the Fresh Face Female at Indian Telly Awards.

In November 2013, Negi participated in the dance couple reality show Nach Baliye season six, along with her partner Dhanjani. They both were one of the entertaining contestants. In February 2014, they both became the winner of the dance show.

In August 2014, Negi entered the Zee TV show Ek Mutthi Aasmaan. She played the role as Kalpana Raghav Singhania opposite Ashish Chaudhary. She made a small appearance in the &TV show Killerr Karaoke Atka Toh Latkah in March 2015.

=== Khatron Ke Khiladi and further success (2015–present) ===
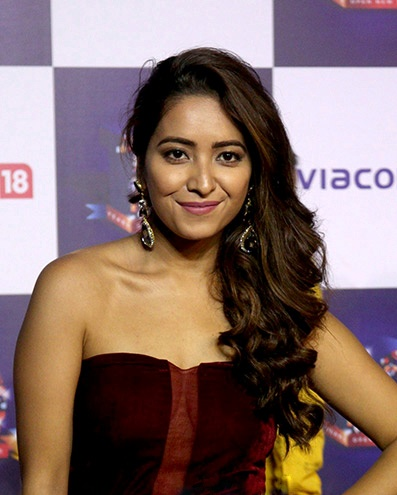
Negi in 2017

Negi participated in the celebrity stunt based show Fear Factor: Khatron Ke Khiladi in 2015. She became one of the finalists on the show. She then appeared in the Ekta Kapoor show Kumkum Bhagya along with Dhanjani reprising their roles in Pavitra Rishta. She also did an episodic appearance in Code Red. She also was a team member in Box Cricket League in Season 1 in 2015 along with Season 2 of BCL. Later, hosted the singing reality show Indian Idol in 2015.

In November 2015, Negi was approached and finalised to replace Shritama Mukherjee in the StarPlus show Kuch Toh Hai Tere Mere Darmiyaan opposite Gautam Gupta and Aly Goni. From 2019 to 2020, Negi played the role of Gauravi Mehta in web series of Alt Balaji named Baarish opposite Sharman Joshi.

=== Other appearance on television ===
In March 2012, Negi appeared as Purvi in the special episode of Punar Vivaah. In August 2012, she again performed for the 5th Boroplus Gold Awards. Later she made a special appearance in two shows Hitler Didi and Sapne Suhane Ladakpan Ke along with her costars Shakti Arora and Rithwik Dhanjani. In the grand finale of Bigg Boss 6, Negi made a special appearance and performed in the Bigg Boss house along with Rati Pandey, Pooja Gor and Rashami Desai. Later she performed at Zee Rishtey Awards 2013. In 2014, Negi performed with Rithvik at the Star Parivaar Awards 2014. In 2014, she also made a guest appearance on Jamai Raja with Sargun Mehta. Later she made another appearance in Kumkum Bhagya in 2015.

== Media image ==
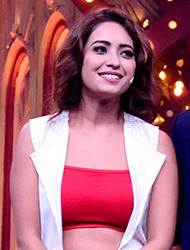
Negi at an event in 2017

Negi was placed 8th in Rediff.com's "Top OTT Actresses" list of 2020. Negi has appeared on the cover of several magazines such as Telly Calendar and Gr8 Magazine, where she featured with Rithvik Dhanjani.

== Filmography ==
=== Films ===
Year	Title	Role	Notes	Ref.
2020	Ludo	Asha Pathak Tiwari		
2021	Collar Bomb	ASI Sumitra Joshi		

=== Television ===
Year	Title	Role	Notes	Ref.
2010	Sapnon Se Bhare Naina	Madhura		
2011	Bade Achhe Lagte Hain	Apeksha Malhotra		
2011–2014	Pavitra Rishta	Purvi Deshmukh Kirloskar		
2012	Shubh Vivah	Seethalakshmi Bai		
2013–2014	Nach Baliye 6	Contestant	Winner	
2014	Ek Mutthi Aasmaan	Kalpana "Kalpi" Jadhav Singhania / Suhana Diwan		
2014–2015	Box Cricket League 1	Contestant	Team: Delhi Dragons	
2015	Khatron Ke Khiladi 6	Contestant	5th runner-up	
2015	Killerr Karaoke Atka Toh Latkah	Contestant		
2015	Yeh Hai Aashiqui	Herself	Episode 94	
2015	Code Rode	Saraswati		
2015	Indian Idol Junior	Host	Season 2	
2015–2016	Kuch Toh Hai Tere Mere Darmiyaan	Koyal Ghosh		
2016	Box Cricket League 2	Contestant	Team: Kolkata Baabu Moshayes	
2017	Entertainment Ki Raat	Various Characters		
2021	Ladies vs Gentlemen	Panelist	Season 2	

==== Special appearances ====
Year	Title	Role	Ref.
2012	Punar Vivaah - Zindagi Milegi Dobara	Purvi Deshmukh Kirloskar	
2012	Hitler Didi	Purvi Deshmukh Kirloskar	
2012	Sapne Suhane Ladakpan Ke	Purvi Deshmukh Kirloskar	
2012	Bigg Boss 6	Herself	
2013	Qubool Hai	Purvi Deshmukh Kirloskar	
2013	India's Best Dramebaaz	Purvi Deshmukh Kirloskar	
2013	Dance India Dance Super Moms	Purvi Deshmukh Kirloskar	
2014	Jamai Raja	Herself	
2015	Kumkum Bhagya	Purvi Deshmukh Kirloskar	
2015	Nach Baliye 7	Herself	
2015	Nadaniyaan	Herself	
2015	Aaj Ki Raat Hai Zindagi	Herself	
2015	Dance Plus 1	Koyal Ghosh	
2015	Yeh Hai Mohabbatein	Koyal Ghosh	
2015	Saath Nibhaana Saathiya	Koyal Ghosh	
2016	Comedy Nights Bachao	Herself	
2016	Comedy Nights Live	Herself	
2017	Bigg Boss 11	Herself	
2017	Super Dancer 2	Herself	
2017	Lip Sing Battle	Herself	
2018	Kaleerein	Herself	
2018	India's Next Superstars	Herself	

=== Web series ===
Year	Title	Role	Notes	Ref.
2019-2020	Baarish	Gauravi Karmakar Mehta	2 seasons	
2020	Love Ka Panga	Neha Sharma		
2020-2022	Abhay	Sonam Khanna	Season 2,3	
2021	Khwabon Ke Parindey	Bindiya		
2023	The Talent Manager	Kritika Kapoor		
2024	Butterflies 5	Disha	Episode: "To Suhani, From Disha"	
2024	Industry	Sanya Sen		
2024	Honeymoon Photographer	Ambika Nath		
2025	Criminal Justice: A Family Matter	Roshni Saluja		
2026	Ali Baba aur 40 Bhoot	Alisha		

== Awards and nominations ==
Year	Award	Category	Work	Result	Ref.
2012	Gold Awards	Stellar Performer Of The Year	Pavitra Rishta	Nominated	
2013	Indian Telly Awards	Best Actress in a Supporting Role	Pavitra Rishta	Nominated	
2013	Indian Telly Awards	Best Onscreen Couple (with Rithvik Dhanjani)	Pavitra Rishta	Nominated	
2013	Gold Awards	Best Actress in a Supporting Role	Pavitra Rishta	Nominated	

== See also ==
- List of Indian television actresses
- List of Indian television actors
