= Kaala Teeka =

Indian television series

- Also known as: Kaala Teeka – Umeed Ka Naya Daur
- Genre: Drama; Romance
- Created by: Bhavna Vyas
- Written by: Bhavna Vyas, S. Manasvi, Srinita Bhaumik, Koel Chaudhuri
- Directed by: Imtiaz Punjabi, Meesha Gautam
- Creative director: Meesha Gautam
- Starring: Simran Pareenja; Sukirti Kandpal; Karan Sharma; Fenil Umrigar; Rohan Gandotra; Daljeet Kaur Bhanot; Mita Vashisht; Mona Ambegaonkar
- Theme music composer: Dony Hazarika
- Composers: Dony Hazarika; Udbhav Ojha
- Country of origin: India
- Original language: Hindi
- No. of seasons: 2
- No. of episodes: 406

Production
- Producers: Tony Singh; Deeya Singh
- Production locations: Bihar; Mumbai
- Editors: Raunak Ahuja; Anshul Ahuja
- Production company: DJ's a Creative Unit

Original release
- Network: ZEE TV
- Release: 2 November 2015 – 14 April 2017

Kaala Teeka is an Indian Hindi-language serial drama television series on Zee TV. The series is produced by DJ's a Creative Unit. The show shows a story set against superstitions. The music of the show is done by Dony½ Hazarika and Udbhav Ojha. it replaced Tum Hi Ho Bandhu Sakha Tumhi and was replaced by Sethji in its time slot.

== Plot ==
Kaala Teeka is the story of Vishwaveer "Vishwa" Jha (Bhupinder Singh) and his quest to keep his only daughter, Gauri, safe and protected. Vishwaveer discovers that an abandoned baby girl can save Gauri from a familial curse, and he adopts her, naming her Kaali and making her Gauri's "Kaala Teeka"

=== After 5 years ===
Kaali (Sargam Khurana) continues protecting Gauri (Adaa Narang) in every way. Gauri, being Vishwaveer's only child, is brought up surrounded with comforts, while Vishwaveer doesn't treat Kaali very well. She was mistreated by Vishwaveer's sister-in-law Kalyani Jha (Mona Ambegaonkar). Vishwaveer's first wife, Manjiri Jha (Dalljiet Kaur), who doesn't have children, adores Kaali and brings her up as her daughter.

Kalyani plots to kill Gauri to get revenge from Vishwaveer for old matter. She kills Kaali first so that she is unable to protect Gauri. However, Kaali survives and relates the incident to Manjiri, who decides to make Kalyani pay.

Kaali and Manjiri confront Kalyani in a temple, where Kalyani ends up killing Manjiri and making it look like Kaali did it. When the family finds out, Vishwaveer decides to take the blame on himself and go to jail in Kaali's place, so that Kaali can stay with Gauri and continue to protect her. As a result, Vishwaveer goes to jail for 14 years.

=== After 14 years ===
Kaali (Simran Pareenja) and Gauri (Fenil Umrigar) are grown up. Kaali is very intelligent and a good singer, but all credits are taken by Gauri. Kaali writes exams for her and sings for her. A guy named Yug Choudhary (Rohan Gandotra) hears Kaali's voice and is taken aback by her voice. He tries to search for her but is unable to find her. Everyone thinks that it is Gauri who sings and Yug also thinks the same, but he is not able to find Gauri. Vishwaveer, while searching for a suitable groom for Gauri, comes across Yug and resolves to get her married to him. Gauri initially refuses but Kaali convinces her, and Gauri eventually falls in love with Yug and agrees to marriage after testing him a couple of times. When Yug's grandmother rejects the proposal considering Vishwa to be a criminal, he brainwashes Gauri's brother Neelkanth "Neel" Jha (Nivin Ramani) into trying to rape Yug's sister Sharmila Choudhary (Meenu Panchal). Neel attempts to do so but is held back by his conscience at the last minute. To save Sharmila's reputation, Yug's grandmother agrees to get Yug married to Gauri in exchange for Neel marrying Sharmila. Meanwhile, it is revealed that Manjiri is still alive and that she lost her memory 14 years ago and saved Yug's life, after which his father took her in as his sister. She is now living with Yug.

After a while, Kaali finds out that Manjiri is still alive and with the help of Yug, Kaali brings her memory back. Yug-Gauri and Neel-Sharmila are now scheduled to get married. Instead, destiny wants to bring Yug and Kaali together who have fallen in love. Yug is Kaali's childhood Ramji.

The show goes on with Manjiri and Yug supporting Kali in every step to get back the love of Vishwaveer and prove to him superstitions are a waste. Gauri's kundli's truth comes out and Kaali is forced to agree to be Gauri's Kaala Teeka again and goes to Yug's house. She gets anxious and encounters Vishwa and decides to leave. Manjiri and Kali get kidnapped by Kalyani, but Yug saves them. Kalyani is arrested and Manjiri goes back to Vishwa and demands Kali and Yug's alliance. Gauri drinks poison but she is saved and Vishwa realizes that it was not Kali being kaala teeka that worked for Gauri but her prayers were the ones that truly worked. He fixes Yug and Kali's alliance to which Yug's mother Leelavita "Leela" Choudhary agrees only because of a hidden motto and she doesn't want Kali to be her daughter-in-law. Therefore, Leela and Gauri team-up. Yug marries Kali but everyone gets tricked as they assume it is Gauri who is marrying Yug. Yug doesn't trust Kali anymore and goes with Gauri. Yug starts to hate Kali.

Time passes by and Yug finally finds out the truth behind Gauri and marries Kali once again. Gauri then plans to make Kali seem dead by injecting some type of medicine on her but that plan fails when her injection breaks. Instead, she puts the poison in the safety pin and hooks it on Kali's doli. Kali is pricked by the safety pin. While performing rituals and praying in the temple at Yug's house, Kali faints. They call the doctor but the doctor tells everyone that Kali is dead. Just then, Yug realizes that it could have been Gauri and goes to her hotel to drag her there. She fakes and does some drama of crying and says she will bring Kali back to life by burning kapur on her hand. She has already put a chemical on her hand to make sure her palm doesn't burn. The poison wears off and Kali regains conscientious, leaving everyone believing Gauri. However, Yug does not believe Gauri and sends her out of the house. Gauri vows for revenge. She comes back as a servant and starts to make Leela believe that an evil spirit is haunting her. She brings a fake astrologer and he tells that Yug should be 21 kilometers away from the house. Leela and Yug believe it and Yug leaves. Later with the help of the astrologer, Gauri makes it look like Kali has the evil spirit inside her and Leela decides to sacrifice Kali. Manjiri comes to Yug's house and discovers that there is a pooja going on and asks for Kali, who is locked in a room. Manjiri gets suspicious and follows the car leading to the ashram. She brings a real astrologer and the truth behind Gauri gets revealed to everyone. Kali, enraged, slaps Gauri for her deeds and Gauri later reveals to everyone that Leela did not want Kali to be her daughter in law and encouraged Gauri that Yug would be married to her. Yug gets distraught and leaves while Gauri and the fake astrologer get arrested. Gauri vows to destroy his whole family. After three months, however, Gauri who is released from jail returns and reveals to everyone that she is pregnant with Yug's child. Because of this Yug allows her to stay until the child is born. Later, it is revealed that Kaali is also pregnant. This matter, however, is only known by Gauri and Vishwa as they bribed the nurse to get her reports before she does. To make sure that Kaali and Yug stay apart Gauri plans to have Kali thrown out of the house which is eventually carried out by Yug himself, as he does so Vishwa then takes Kaali to the top of a cliff and reveals her pregnancy to her just as he is about to push her off. Vishwa pushes Kali off of the cliff but Kali hangs onto a branch. Vishwa throws a rock at her and she falls. Afterward, Kali's suicide note comes and everyone believes Kali to be dead. Leela asks Yug to marry Gauri and give the child a legitimate name. Yug agrees to marry Gauri. Meanwhile, Kali doesn't die and is saved by a mentally challenged man named Nandu Singh (Mayank Gandhi). Kali asks Nandu to take her to Choudhary House. Nandu takes her there but returns. There back in his village, some kids tease him as Kali's husband. Nandu becomes shy and later, Nandu marries Kali and then takes her to the hospital where he gets to know that Kali is in a coma.

== Cast ==
=== Main ===
- Simran Pareenja as
  - Kaali Jha Singh: Vishwa and Manjiri's adopted daughter; Gauri and Neelkanth's adopted half-sister; Yug's ex-wife; Nandu's wife; Pavitra's mother (2016–17)
    - Sargam Khurana as Child Kaali (2015–16)
  - Pavitra Singh Thakur: Kaali and Nandu's daughter; Naina's adopted cousin; Krishna's wife (2017)
- Fenil Umrigar as Gauri Jha Chaudhary: Vishwa and Madhuri's daughter; Manjiri's step-daughter; Neelkanth's sister; Kaali's adopted sister; Yug's second wife; Naina's mother (2016–17)
  - Adaa Narang as Child Gauri (2015–16)
- Rohan Gandotra as Yug Chaudhary: Leelavati's son; Sharmila's brother; Kaali's ex-husband; Gauri's husband; Naina's father (2016–17)
- Mayank Gandhi as Nandu Singh: Devri's brother; Kaali's second husband; Pavitra's father (2016–17)
- Karan Sharma as Krishna Thakur: Dev's son; Naina's ex-lover; Pavitra's husband (2017)
- Sukirti Kandpal as Naina Chaudhary: Gauri and Yug's daughter; Pavitra's adopted cousin; Dev's ex-fiancée (2017)
- Bhupinder Singh as Vishwaveer "Vishwa" Jha: Manjiri and Madhuri's husband; Gauri and Neel's father; Kaali's adoptive father; Naina's grandfather; Pavitra's adoptive grandfather (2015–16)
- Parag Tyagi as Dev Thakur: Krishna's father; Naina's ex-fiancé (2017)

=== Recurring ===
- Pratima Kazmi as Maai: Pavitra's caretaker (2017)
- Ashita Dhawan as Chulbuli (2017)
- Daljeet Kaur as Manjiri Jha: Vishwa's first wife; Kaali's adoptive mother; Gauri and Neel's step-mother (2015–17)
- Nivin Ramani as Neelkanth Jha: Vishwa and Madhuri's son; Manjiri's step-son; Gauri's brother; Kaali's adopted brother; Sharmila's husband (2016–17)
- Meenu Panchal as Sharmila Chaudhary Jha: Leelavati's daughter; Yug's sister; Neel's wife (2016–17)
- Rajesh Puri as Raj Purohit (2016–17)
- Hifsa Sharma as Dimpy (2017)
- Vineet Raina as Devri Singh, Nandu's brother (2016–17)
- Geeta Agarwal Sharma as Leelavati Chaudhary, Yug and Sharmila's mother (2016–17)
- Mita Vashisht as Jethi Maa (2016)
- Akshara Singh as Madhuri Jha, Vishwa's second wife, Gauri and Neel's mother, Kaali's adoptive step-mother (2015–17)
- Mona Ambegaonkar as Kalyani Jha, Vishwa's sister-in-law, Gauri and Neel's aunt, Kaali's adoptive aunt (2015–17)
- Shriyansh Tiwari as Heera (2015)
- Varun Sharma as Shambhu (2015)
- Surya Sharma as Aryan (2016)
- Praveen Hingonia as Bablu (2015–16)
- Pratichee Mishra as Jamuna (2016–17)
- Sara Khan as Dancer in temple, special appearance in crossover episode with Sarojini (2016)
- Latika Gill as Dahi Jha (2015–16), Vishwa's niece, Gauri and Neel's step-cousin, Bhoondi's twin sister
- Aparna Mishra as Bhoondi Jha (2015–16), Vishwa's niece, Gauri and Neel's step-cousin, Dahi's twin sister
