= Charlie Chauhan =

Indian actress (born 1989)

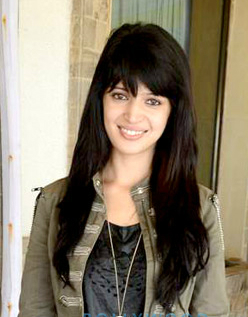
- Charlie Chauhan at the launch of Yeh Hai Aashiqui
- Born: 8 September 1989 (age 37); Shimla, Himachal Pradesh, India
- Occupation: Actress
- Years active: 2009–present
- Known for: Best Friends Forever, Kaisi Yeh Yaariyan
- Spouse: Ramandeep Singh (m. 2026)

Charlie Chauhan (born 8 September 1989) is an Indian actress known for playing the role of Ela in the teen drama Best Friends Forever? and Mukti Vardhan in Kaisi Yeh Yaariyan.

== Career ==
Charlie Played the lead role in the show Best Friends Forever?. She also participated in the reality dance show Nach Baliye 5 with Kunwar Amar. She portrayed the character of Mukti Vardhan in MTV popular youth show Kaisi Yeh Yaariyan, and she has also been part of the music album Beparwaahiyaan.

== Filmography ==
=== Television ===
Year	Title	Role	Ref.
2009	MTV Roadies 7	Contestant	
2012	Gumrah: End of Innocence	Reema	
2012–2013	Best Friends Forever?	Elakshi Singh	
2012–2013	Nach Baliye 5	Contestant	
2013	MTV Webbed	Tia	
2013	Yeh Hai Aashiqui	Suhina	Ep 1: Tasveer
2014	Pyaar Tune Kya Kiya	Maya	
2014	Ishq Kills	Ranjeeta	Ep 1
2014–2018	Kaisi Yeh Yaariaan	Mukti Vardhan	
2016	Yeh Hai Aashiqui 4	Inara	

=== Film ===
Year	Films	Role	Notes	Ref.
2018	The Love Bites	Zara	Short film	
2021	The Usual Night	Shweta	Short film	

== Personal life ==
On 7 August 2026, Charlie married Indian cricketer Ramandeep Singh in a traditional Sikh wedding ceremony at a gurdwara, following an eight-year relationship.

== See also ==
- List of Indian television actresses
