= Fenil Umrigar =

Indian television actress

- Born: 14 January 1996 (age 30); Surat, Gujarat
- Occupation: Actress
- Years active: 2010–present
- Known for: Best Friends Forever? Bade Achhe Lagte Hain; Kaala Teeka; Rajaa Betaa
- Spouse: Gurpartap Dhaliwal (m. 2024)

Fenil Umrigar Dhaliwal is an Indian actress who works in Hindi television. She is best known for her portrayal of Sanjana Roy in Best Friends Forever?, Pihu Kapoor Shergill in Bade Achhe Lagte Hain, Gauri Jha Chaudhary in Kaala Teeka and Pankhuri Mishra in Rajaa Betaa.

== Early life ==
Umrigar was born and brought up in Surat, Gujarat.

== Personal life ==
On 21 October 2024, Umrigar married her mutual friend, Gurpartap Dhaliwal.

== Career ==
Umrigar made her acting debut with Maryada: Lekin Kab Tak? and went onto portray crucial roles in Dil Se Di Dua... Saubhagyavati Bhava? and Madhubala – Ek Ishq Ek Junoon.

She also appeared in episodic roles in Yeh Hai Aashiqui, Love by Chance, Gumrah: End of Innocence, Pyaar Tune Kya Kiya and Laal Ishq.

Umrigar is best known for her lead portrayal of Sanjana "Sanju" Roy in Best Friends Forever?, Pihu Kapoor Shergill in Bade Achhe Lagte Hain and Dhurmona/Sridevi in Yam Hain Hum.

She also portrayed the negative lead of Gauri Jha Chaudhary in Kaala Teeka and Pankhuri Mishra in Rajaa Betaa. In 2021, she appeared in the music video "Saukha Nayio Mileya".

From August 2022 to September 2023, she is seen portraying Sonam Goyal in Saavi Ki Savaari.

== Filmography ==
=== Television ===
Year	Title	Role	Notes	Ref.
2012	Dil Se Di Dua... Saubhagyavati Bhava?	Priya Malhotra		
2012	Best Friends Forever?	Sanjana "Sanju" Roy		
2013	Bade Achhe Lagte Hain	Pihu Kapoor Shergill		
2014	Yeh Hai Aashiqui	Rachael	Episode: "Like Papa, Like Beti"	
2014	Love by Chance	Manvi	Episode: "Love In Top Gear"	
2014	Yeh Hai Aashiqui	Mallika	Episode: "The List"	
2014–2015	Yam Hain Hum	Dhumorna/Sridevi		
2016	Pyaar Tune Kya Kiya	Raashi		
2016–2017	Kaala Teeka	Gauri Jha Chaudhary		
2018	Laal Ishq	Naina	Episode: "Ghoonghat Mein Chanda Hai"	
2019	Rajaa Betaa	Pankhuri Mishra		
2022–2023	Saavi Ki Savaari	Sonam Goyal		

=== Music videos ===
Year	Title	Singer(s)	Ref.
2021	Saukha Nayio Mileya	Sajjan Adeeb, Neetu Bhalla	
2025	Galbaat	Harf Cheema, Gulab Sidhu	
2025	ZORN	Happy Raikoti, GKhan	

== See also ==
- List of Indian television actresses
