= Aditi Singh =

Aditi Singh may refer to:

- Aditi Singh (actress) (born 1995), Indian actress
- Aditi Singh (politician) (born 1987), Indian politician

== See also ==
- Aditi Singh Sharma (born 1986), Indian playback singer
