= Yeh Hai Aashiqui =

Indian television series (2013-2016)

- Promotional picture of Yeh Hai Aashiqui
- Genre: Romance
- Story by: Vikas Gupta
- Starring: See below
- Country of origin: India
- Original language: Hindi
- No. of seasons: 4
- No. of episodes: 153

Production
- Executive producer: Vikas Gupta
- Running time: 42 minutes
- Production companies: Lost Boy Productions; Red Dot Tellyworks; BBC Studios; Bodhi Tree

Original release
- Network: Bindass
- Release: 25 August 2013 – 7 August 2016

Yeh Hai Aashiqui (transl. This is love) is an Indian Hindi-language television romance anthology series that premiered on 25 August 2013 on Bindass. It presents dramatisations of the real life love stories created by Vikas Gupta. The show went off air on 7 August 2016 with 4 seasons and 153 episodes.

The title track of the series is written by Abhiruchi Chand and composed by Abhishek Arora. The fourth season's title track is sung by Mohit Chauhan and Neeti Mohan.

== Overview ==
Season	Name	No. of episodes	Originally aired		Hosts
Season	Name	No. of episodes	Season premiere	Season finale	Hosts
1	Yeh Hai Aashiqui (Love Heroes)	94	25 August 2013	22 March 2015	Vikrant Massey (Episodes 1–13); Rithvik Dhanjani (Episodes 14–94)
2	Yeh Hai Aashiqui (Siyappa Ishq Ka)	20	June 2015	September 2015	Rithvik Dhanjani
3	Yeh Hai Aashiqui (Sun Yaar Try Maar)	13	October 2015	December 2015	Rapper Maddy
4	Yeh Hai Aashiqui	26	January 2016	August 2016	Mrinal Dutt

== Premise ==
Yeh Hai Aashiqui is a romantic anthology series of unconventional stories about love and relationships that are considered taboo by the society as they go against the traditional mindset. The series follows stories that are inspired by real life.

== Episodes ==
=== Season 1 - Love Heroes ===
Episode no.	Name	On air Date
1	Tasveer	25 August 2013
2	Tip Tip Barsa Pyaar	
3	Deadline	
4	Bhai Jaan	15 September 2013
5	On The Run Music Video	
6	Aankhon Dekhi	
7	Lights, Camera, Heartbreak	6 October 2013
8	Family Matters	13 October 2013
9	Shaadi Ya Pyaar	20 October 2013
10	Pyaar Ka Blueprint	27 October 2013
11	Love All	28 October 2013
12	Saat Phere Aur Ek Gunshot	1 November 2013
13	Flowers For Annie	
14	Pati, Patni Aur No	8 November 2013
15	Hostage Situation	
16	Cha Cha Chaahat - Part 1	
17	Cha Cha Chaahat - Part 2	
18	Beauty And The Gangster	24 November 2013
19	Ganga Maili	
20	Partheo Aur Miniet	11 August 2013
21	Love Calling	
22	Baby Love	22 December 2013
23	Home Coming	29 December 2013
24	Dance Dreams	
25	PariWAR	
26	Teacher's Pet	14 January 2014
27	Border Ke Uss Taraf	
28	Mera Kidnapper, Mera Saviour	2 February 2014
29	Beauty Inside Out	
30	Sense Of Umar	16 February 2014
31	Professional Hazards	23 February 2014
32	Same Difference	1 March 2014
33	Objection ! I Love Him !	
34	Love Happens	16 March 2014
35	Bar Bar Dekho	23 March 2014
36	Like Papa, Like Beti	30 March 2014
37	This Or That?	
38	Meri Maa	13 April 2014
39	Soul For Sale	20 April 2014
40	Only Words	
41	In Between Two Women	
42	Pyaar Over Pizza	
43	Suicide Mission	
44	The Item Girl	
45	Pyaaritics	
46	Dance Into My Heart	
47	My Dil Goes Left Right Left	
48	Agla Station Pyaar	
49	Sab Paani Mein	
50	My Dil Goes Left Right Left	
51	Pyaar Ka Expose	
52	Love, Camera, Dhoka	
53	Ek Coffee Do Chammach Pyaar	
54	Didi Se Dhoka	
55	Khud Ko Kya Samajhta Hai	
56	Dil Ki Awaaz	
57	Yes Boss	
58	The Mili Express	
59	Long Distance Woes	
60	The Money Factor	
61	Auto Se Radio	
62	The Other Mummy	29 August 2014
63	Bad Luck Bikers	
64	Amritsar via LA	
65	Love Story	
66	Bad Company	12 September 2014
67	Memory Mishap	
68	Silsila Salsa Ka	
69	Beauty Inside Out	
70	North And South	28 September 2014
71	Rock On, Pyaar Off	12 October 2014
72	I'm A Phool For You	19 October 2014
73	The End of the Line	
74	Andekhi Pyaar	
75	Drug Deal	9 November 2014
76	Bodyguard Boyfriend	
77	Horror Scope!	
78	All In the Family	
79	Jealous Guy	
80	Cursed	
81	Basketball Sweethearts	
82	Online Hero	28 December 2014
83	FM Station	
84	Flying Without Wings	
85	The Driving Force	
86	Ex Husband, Present Cupid	25 January 2015
87	Band, Baaja, Scandal	1 February 2015
88	Kyunki Friction Se Hi Spark Aati Hai	
89	Standing Tall	15 February 2015
90	Obsessed	22 February 2015
91	I Love You Idiot	
92	Hamesha Tumhara Amay	
93	I Love You Ruksaar	
94	Onscreen/Offscreen	15 March 2015

=== Season 2 - Siyappa Ishq Ka ===
Episode no.	Name	Air Date
1	Weekend Boyfriend	20 June 2015
2	Super Duper Love	
3	Reel Life To Real Life	
4	Best Friends Forever	14 July 2015
5	The Odd Girl	18 July 2015
6	Misunderstanding	
7	Chance Pe Dance	31 July 2015
8	Lost In Love	
9	Kidnapping	
10	Revenge Love	
11	Angela	
12	Rock Band	
13	Boxer Girl	
14	Shop Lifter	
15	Fake Marriage	
16	The List	
17	Never Been Kissed	
18	The Guest	
19	Shandaar	
20	Start Up	September 2015

=== Season 3 - Sun Yaar Try Maar ===
Episode no.	Name	Air Date
1	Rakhi Brother	October 2015
2	Ferrywala Love	
3	As Seen On TV	
4	Dentist & Patient	
5	Courtroom Romance	
6	Hostelwaali	
7	Shaadi	
8	Funeral	
9	Football	
10	Jhoot Bungla	
11	Ms. Kasauli	
12	Bhaangover	
13	Pyaar Mein 2nd	17 February 2016

=== Season 4 ===
Episode no.	Name	Air Date
1	Pammi Ki Shaadi	21 March 2016
2	Kidnapped	
3	Pass Ya Fail	
4	Hindu Muslim	
5	Escort	
6	Gangster	
7	Bartender	
8	Hostel	
9	Driver's Son	
10	Secret Marriage	
11	Blind Romance	
12	Bikers	
13	Shall We Dance	
14	Bodyguard	
15	Trafficking	
16	Khap	
17	Saving Zara	
18	Vote For Love	
19	Office Romance	
20	Girl In The Photograph	
21	HIV	
22	Ex Convict	
23	Forget Me Not	
24	Trippin On Love	
25	Heartly Yours	
26	Goon With A Golden Heart	

== Cast ==
=== Season 1 ===
- Episode 1: Tasveer
  Anita Hassanandani as Priyanka, Yuvraj Thakur as Tushar,"
  Charlie Chauhan as Suhina, Vineet Raina as Manoj,
  Kishwer Merchant and Suyyash Rai in Guest Appearance
- Episode 2: Tip Tip Barsa Pyaar

Veebha Anand as Sapna and Gaurav Bajaj as Vinay

- Episode 3: Deadline

Abigail Jain as Komal and Vishal Singh as Anmol

- Episode 4: Bhai Jaan

Adaa Khan as Shubhalaxmi Iyer and Lavin Gothi as Bhaskar

- Episode 6: Aankhon Dekhi

Soumya Seth as Sara Hussain

- Episode 7: Lights, Camera, Heartbreak

Rithvik Dhanjani as Kabir and Mihika Verma as Fiza

- Episode 8: Family Matters

Vinay Rohrra as Ankur and Priyal Gor as Mukti

- Episode 9: Shadi Ya Pyaar

Shakti Arora as Mayank and Anupriya Kapoor as Suman

- Episode 10: Pyaar Ka Blueprint

Jugal Hansraj and Jayashree Venketaramanan

- Sehban Azim as Neel and Pooja Gor as Pakhi (Episode 14)
- Nabeel Ahmed as Vibhu and Manoj (2 episodes)
- Mayank Gandhi as Ranveer and Neha Sargam as Shruti (episode 15)
- Barkha Bisht as Urmi and Shravan Reddy as Arjun (episode 26)
- Amrita Prakash as Tabasum and Shahab Khan as Imraan (episode 27)
- Mohit Malhotra as Mac and Dimple Jhangiani as Manasvi (episode 34)
- Kunal Bhatia as Karan Thakkar (episode 45)
- Aditya Redij as Aditya and Nazea Hasan Sayed as Shruti (episode 35)
- Neelam Sivia as Naina (episode 55)
- Chhavi Pandey as Dhristi and Nakul Sahdev as Armaan (episode 74)
- Rohit Khandelwal as Veer (episode 76)
- Shrishti Ganguly Rindani as Udita and Rohan Mehra as Amar (episode 77)
- as Ashish and as Keli (episode 79)
- Smriti Khanna as Reeva and Suyyash Rai as Tapan (episode 88)
- Shantanu Maheshwari as Shaan and Vrushika Mehta as Rukhsaar (episode 93)
- Rithvik Dhanjani as Rithvik and Asha Negi as Asha (episode 94)
- Raj Singh Arora as Aditya
- Karan Jotwani as Ashish
- Priya Bathija as Manini
- Vivek Dahiya as Devesh
- Ali Merchant as Rudra
- Himmanshoo A. Malhotra as Mayur and Shivshakti Sachdev as Bhoomi
- Mudit Nayar as Ved
- Ayaz Ahmed as Kanishk and Nikita Sharma as Pragya
- Sumeet Sachdev as Aseem Sen
- Ravish Desai as Arjit and Riya Bamniyal as Ahana
- Sana Saeed as Nandini and Ravi Dubey as Rishi
- Tanya Abrol as Santosh, Meiyang Chang as Jigme Amitayushya Mishra as Sachin
- Priya Chauhan as Priya
- Shaleen Bhanot as Rakshit (episode 50)
- Vrinda Dawda as Sneha and Neil Bhatt as Pratyush
- Gaurav S Bajaj as Rishi and Riddhi Dogra as Mili.
- Anurag Sharma as Prateek
- Shivya Pathania
- Soumya Seth as Sara Hussain and Karan Sharma
- Fenil Umrigar as Rachael and Shraman Jain as Ayush
- Niti Taylor as Trisha and Rohan Shah as Rishi
- Rohan Shah as Mohit
- Veebha Anand as Sapna
- Ruslaan Mumtaz as Kabir Khan (episode 70)
- Sumona Chakravarti as Tejaswini
- Aishwarya Sakhuja and Sangram Singh
- Mohit Abrol as Ahaan
- Annie Gill as Ayesha
- Ravjeet Singh
- Mansi Srivastava
- Siddhant Karnick as Karan and Meher Vij
- Kunal Jaisingh as Prince Jeet Singh and Namita Dubey as Radhika
- Shilpa Saklani as Aditi and Karanvir Bohra as Rohan
- Mrinalini Tyagi and Kanwar Dhillon
- Additi Gupta as Ganga and Milli
- Ankit Gera
- Manoj Chandila
- Abigail Jain
- Arjun Bijlani as Varun
- Rucha Gujarathi
- Barkha Sengupta
- Neha Sargam

=== Season 2 ===
- Nakul Sahadev as Reyansh a.k.a. Rio & Roshmita Rahaman as Sneha (Episode 2: Super Duper Love).
- Shrishti Rindani as Pankhuri, Ayush Mehra as Aditya & Mahira Sharma as Shweta (Episode 4: Best Friends Forever).
- Teeshay Shah as Avi & Sheetal Singh as Ananya (Episode 6: Misunderstanding).
- Annie Gill as Krish & Jitendra Nokewal as Nick (Episode: Weekend Boyfriend )
- Zaan Khan as Shrey & Jayashree Venketaramanan as Naina (Episode 17: Never Been Kissed).
- Abigail Jain as Jasmine & Abhishek Kapur as Dilawar a.k.a. D.K. (Episode 20: Start-up).

=== Season 3 ===
- Shehzad Shaikh as Mukul and Sana Sayyad as Avanti (Episode 10: Bhangover).
- Darsheel Safary as Abhay and Rhea Sharma as Chandini (Episode 11: Pyaar me 2nd).
- Aashika Bhatia

=== Season 4 ===
- Shehzad Shaikh as Ankush and Namita Dubey as Pammi (Episode 1: Pammi Ki Shaadi).
- Krishna Mukherjee as Sanjana and Reyaansh Chadha as Kunal (Episode 2: Kidnapped).
- Chandni Bhagwanani as Gulnazz and Nakul Sahadev as Sahil (Episode 3: Pass Ya Fail).
- Karan Jotwani as Abhiram and Kaashish Vohra as Ayesha (Episode 4: Hindu Muslim).
- Urfi Javed as Alia and Aakarshan Singh as Akash (Episode 5: Escort)
- Aashim Gulati as Ayush and Sanaya Pithawalla as Anokhi (Episode 6: Gangster).
- Krissann Barretto as Alisha & Ronit Kapil as Zaheer (Episode 7: Bartender).
- Mansi Srivastava as Ambika and Karan Sharma as Ranjeet (Episode 8: Hostel).
- Vaishali Takkar as Vrinda & (Episode 9: Driver's Son).
- Aneri Vajani as Riddhi and Mishkat Varma as Josy (Episode 10: Secret Marriage).
- Vikas Manaktala as Neil and Manasi Rachh as Aarohi (Episode 11: Blind Romance).
- Sehban Azim as Nikhil a.k.a. Nick and Akasa Singh as Piya (Episode 12: Bikers).
- Charlie Chauhan as Inara and Kunwar Amar as Ayaan (Episode 13: Shall We Dance).
- Shivangi Joshi as Meera and Ravjeet Singh as Angad (Episode 14: Bodyguard).
- Ankit Gera as Atish and Pooja Sharma as Shivi (Episode 15: Trafficking).
- Shaleen Malhotra as Arjun and Nisha Nagpal as Mahi (Episode 16: Khap).
- Shivya Pathania as Zara and Adhish Khanna as Nakul (Episode 17: Saving Zara).
- Mrinal Dutt as Yuraj and Monica Sehgal as Kavya (Episode 18: Vote For Love).
- Zaan Khan as Vicky and Priyamvada Kant as Sheena (Episode 19: Office Romance).
- Rishi Dev as Ranvir and Shanice Shrestha as Sonakshi (Episode 20: Girl In The Photograph).
- Parv Kalia as Jai and Nida Chakraborty as Pallavi (Episode 21: HIV).
- Rhea Sharma as Shubhi and Kinshuk Vaidya as Ambar (Episode 22: Ex-Convict).
- Rahul Verma Rajput as Avi and Ishita Ganguly as Navya (Episode 23: Forget Me Not).
- Fahad Ali as Ashwin & Annie Gill as Maya (Episode 24: Trippin In Love).
- Ayush Mehra as Aarav and Shrishti Ganguly Rindani as Ahana (Episode 25: Heartly Yours).
- Vinita Joshi as Dr. Mihika and Manish Tulsiyani as Raghav (Episode 26: Goon With A Good Heart).
- Raqesh Vashisth as Raqesh and Riddhi Dogra as Riddhi.

=== Guests ===
- 2014 – Madhuri Dixit to promote her film Dedh Ishqiya.
- 2014 – Parineeti Chopra and Sidharth Malhotra to promote their film Hasee Toh Phasee.
- 2015 – Shahid Kapoor and Alia Bhatt to promote their film Shaandaar.
