= Baarish (TV series) =

2019 television film

- Web series poster
- Genre: Drama
- Created by: Ekta Kapoor
- Written by: Aayush Agrawal
- Screenplay by: Aayush Agrawal
- Directed by: Nandita Mehra
- Creative director: Baljit Singh Chaddha
- Starring: Manit Joura; Sharman Joshi
- Music by: Aashish Rego; Abhijeet Hegdepatil KK
- Opening theme: Baarish
- Ending theme: Baarish
- Country of origin: India
- Original language: Hindi
- No. of seasons: 2
- No. of episodes: 40 (list of episodes)

Production
- Executive producer: Akanksha Shukla
- Producers: Bhairavi Raichura; Nandita Mehra
- Production locations: Mumbai, India
- Editor: Shlok Bhandari
- Camera setup: Multi-camera
- Running time: 18-23 minutes
- Production company: 24 Frames Media

Original release
- Network: ALTBalaji
- Release: 25 April 2019 – 6 May 2020

Baarish - When you are in mood for romance is a 2019 Hindi web series developed by Ekta Kapoor for ALTBalaji and ZEE5. The series stars Asha Negi and Sharman Joshi as protagonists and revolves around their completely opposite personalities and explores their lives.

The series is available for streaming on the ALTBalaji app and its associated websites since its release date.

The series was launched on Zee TV on 25 March 2020 as a substitute to the Zee TV shows whose broadcast had to be stopped by the channel due to the COVID-19 pandemic.

== Plot ==
The series revolves around a millionaire Gujarati businessman Anuj and a Marathi girl Gauravi who are two complete strangers hailing from completely different backgrounds.

Anuj quits his studies to take care of his siblings and the family business after the death of his father. He builds his own business empire "Mehta Diamonds" from scratch. He has great respect for all his employees and considers them family. On the other hand, Gauravi grows up in a middle-class family where education is of prime importance. She works in Mehta Diamonds. Her younger brother Aniket is dating Shreya, Anuj's sister. Anuj also has a spoilt brother, Rishi, who looks after sales at Mehta Jewelers. Anuj and Gauravi come close to each other during an exhibition where he saves her from a conspiracy.

Circumstances lead to Anuj and Gauravi's families arranging for them to be married. Gradually, they fall in love.

== Cast ==
Actor	Role(s)	Description	Appearances	
Actor	Role(s)	Description	Season 1	Season 2
Sharman Joshi	Anuj Mehta		Main	Main
Asha Negi	Gauravi Karmakar Mehta	Anuj's wife	Main	Main
Manit Joura	Lawyer Manit Joura		Recurring	Recurring
Vikram Singh Chauhan	Aniket Karmakar	Gauravi's brother	Recurring	Recurring
Abhishek Verma	Rohit		Recurring	Recurring
Priya Banerjee	Shreya Mehta Karmakar	Anuj's sister	Recurring	Recurring
Sahil Shroff	Rishi Mehta	Anuj's brother	Recurring	Recurring
Benaf Dadachandji	Zeenia		Recurring	Recurring
Jay Zaveri	Mr. Mehta	Anuj's father	Recurring	
Jeetendra	Jeetu Bhai			Recurring

== Episodes ==
Series	Episodes	Originally released
1	20	25 April 2019
2	20	6 May 2020

=== Season 1 ===
No. overall	No. in season	Title	Directed by	Written by	Original release date
1	1	Unknown	Aayush Agrawal	25 March 2019	
2	2	"Aaj Mausam Bada Beimaan Hai"	Nandita Mehra	Aayush Agrawal	26 March 2019
3	3	"Destiny!"	Nandita Mehra	Aayush Agrawal	27 March 2019
4	4	"Marriage Proposal?"	Nandita Mehra	Aayush Agrawal	30 March 2019
5	5	"Perfect Jodi?"	Nandita Mehra	Aayush Agrawal	31 March 2019
6	6	"Marriage Ingredients"	Nandita Mehra	Aayush Agrawal	1 April 2019
7	7	"Roka"	Nandita Mehra	Aayush Agrawal	2 April 2019
8	8	"Sangeet"	Nandita Mehra	Aayush Agrawal	3 April 2019
9	9	"Dilse Dil Ko Baandhta Hai"	Nandita Mehra	Aayush Agrawal	4 April 2019
10	10	"Woh teen mahine"	Nandita Mehra	Aayush Agrawal	5 April 2019
11	11	"Don’t mess it up Anooz!"	Nandita Mehra	Aayush Agrawal	6 April 2019
12	12	"Anuj’s disappearance"	Nandita Mehra	Aayush Agrawal	7 April 2019
13	13	"Anuj’s birthday, Gauravi’s gift!"	Nandita Mehra	Aayush Agrawal	8 April 2019
14	14	"Arranged Marriage!"	Nandita Mehra	Aayush Agrawal	9 April 2019
15	15	"Siblings v/s Spouses"	Nandita Mehra	Aayush Agrawal	10 April 2019
16	16	"Pyaar na thoda complicated hota hai"	Nandita Mehra	Aayush Agrawal	11 April 2019
17	17	"Dark Clouds"	Nandita Mehra	Aayush Agrawal	12 April 2019
18	18	"It’s complicated"	Nandita Mehra	Aayush Agrawal	13 April 2019
19	19	"Tum wahan.. main yahan"	Nandita Mehra	Aayush Agrawal	14 April 2019
20	20	"Pyaar andha hota hai"	Nandita Mehra	Aayush Agrawal	15 April 2019

=== Season 2 ===
No. overall	No. in season	Title	Directed by	Written by	Original release date
21	1	"Waqt Ne Kiya Kya Haseen Sitam Tum Rahe Na Tum, Hum Rahe Na Hum"	Nandita Mehra	Aayush Agrawal	6 May 2020
22	2	"Aap Se Tum Tak Ka Safar"	Nandita Mehra	Aayush Agrawal	6 May 2020
23	3	"Yeh Ghar Bahut Haseen Hai"	Nandita Mehra	Aayush Agrawal	6 May 2020
24	4	"Bin Bole Sab Jaanta Hai… Dil Ko Dil Se Baandhata Hai… Kitne Bholasa Ye Pyaar Hai"	Nandita Mehra	Aayush Agrawal	6 May 2020
25	5	"Ye Kya Ghadi Hai… Hum Ajnabi Hain… Duniya Meri Kyu Mujhse Khafa Hai…"	Nandita Mehra	Aayush Agrawal	6 May 2020
26	6	"Chaahe Kitni Dooriyaan Hongi Darmiyaan… Sunn Raha Phir Bhi Dil, Dil Ki Ye Daastaan"	Nandita Mehra	Aayush Agrawal	6 May 2020
27	7	"Ye Ishq Ab Le Jo Imtehaan… Dene Chale Hum Beparrwaah…"	Nandita Mehra	Aayush Agrawal	6 May 2020
28	8	"Ghadi Waqt Dikhati Hai, Waqt Deti Nahi Hai…"	Nandita Mehra	Aayush Agrawal	6 May 2020
29	9	"Lamhon Se Likhdi Ek Daastaan… Khamoshiyon Ki Padhtey Zubaan…"	Nandita Mehra	Aayush Agrawal	6 May 2020
30	10	"Dheere Chalne Se Peeche Chhoot Jaate Hain… Tez Chalne Se Yaadein Peeche Chhoot Jaati Hain…"	Nandita Mehra	Aayush Agrawal	6 May 2020
31	11	"Apna Bhi Ho Jaayega – Divorce!!"	Nandita Mehra	Aayush Agrawal	6 May 2020
32	12	"Tujhse Ho Roothe Roothe… Tujhme Hi Toote Toote"	Nandita Mehra	Aayush Agrawal	25 May 2020
33	13	"Kisi Ek Ki Wajah Se, Do Logon Ko Dukhi Nahi Hona Chahiye"	Nandita Mehra	Aayush Agrawal	25 May 2020
34	14	"Tumhari Wajah Bhi Badal Gayi Hai, Hamare Haalat Ki Tarah"	Nandita Mehra	Aayush Agrawal	25 May 2020
35	15	"Tumhi Uljhe Rahe Hamein Aazmane Mein"	Nandita Mehra	Aayush Agrawal	25 May 2020
36	16	"Mera Kuch Saaman, Tumhare Paas Padha Hai"	Nandita Mehra	Aayush Agrawal	25 May 2020
37	17	"Ab Bas, Aaramse Iss Divorce Ko Ho Jaane Do"	Nandita Mehra	Aayush Agrawal	25 May 2020
38	18	"P.A.T.I – Patience Always Till Infinity"	Nandita Mehra	Aayush Agrawal	25 May 2020
39	19	"Do Shaadiyaan Ek Saath Shuru Hui Aur Ek Saath Khatam Bhi"	Nandita Mehra	Aayush Agrawal	25 May 2020
40	20	"The End… Prem Kahani Wo Badi Banti Hai Jismein Aanewali Mushkilein Badi Badi Hon"	Nandita Mehra	Aayush Agrawal	25 May 2020
