= Chandni Bhagwanani =

Indian television actress

- Born: Mumbai, Maharashtra, India
- Occupation: Actress
- Years active: 2002–present
- Parent: Vinod Bhagwanani (father)
- Relatives: Himanshu Bhagwanani (brother)

Chandani Bhagwanani is an Indian television actress. She made her debut with Kohi Apna Sa and went on to replace Hansika Motwani in Kyunki Saas Bhi Kabhi Bahu Thi. She is best known for her roles of Amita in Sony TV's serial Amita Ka Amit and Sanjana in Tum Hi Ho Bandhu Sakha Tumhi on Zee TV. She was seen in negative roles in Roop - Mard Ka Naya Swaroop as Palak and Dr. Asha in Sanjivani. She also seen as portraying Pallavi in StarPlus's Imlie. In January 2024 Bhagwanani replaced Muskan Bamne as Pakhi Shah in StarPlus's Anupamaa and quit in October 2024 owing to a generation leap.

== Television ==
Year	Serial	Role	Channel
2002	Kohi Apna Sa	Child Komal Gill	Zee TV
2003	C.I.D. Episode 293 - 294	Juhi (Child Actor)	Sony Entertainment Television
2003–2005	Kayaamat – Jabb Bhi Waqt Aata Hai	Child Anisha Ahuja	DD National
2003 - 2005	Kyunki Saas Bhi Kabhi Bahu Thi	Child Bavri Virani	Star Plus
2010 - 2011	Tere Liye	Paromita	Star Plus
2013	Amita Ka Amit	Amita Patel / Amita Amit Shah	Sony Entertainment Television
2014	Jhalli Anjali Ke Tootey Dil Ki Amazing Story	Anjali Ahluwalia	Channel V India
2014	P.S. I Hate You	Dimple Sood	Channel V India
2015	Code Red	Shikha Vyas	Colors TV
2015	Pyaar Tune Kya Kiya	Tina	Zing
2015	Tum Hi Ho Bandhu Sakha Tumhi	Sanjana Ajay Pethawala	Zee TV
2015	Twist Wala Love - Fairy Tales Remixed	Bhoomi	Channel V India
2016	Santoshi Maa	Riya	&TV
2016	Khidki	Kiran Baweja	SAB TV
2016	Yeh Hai Aashiqui (Season 4)	Gulnaz	Bindass
2016	College Ka Pehla Pyaar	Alvira Sharma	
2018	Mahakali — Anth Hi Aarambh Hai	Behula	Colors TV
2018	Roop - Mard Ka Naya Swaroop	Palak Goradia	Colors TV
2019	Sanjivani	Dr. Asha Kanwar	Star Plus
2020	Crime Alert	Sakshi Suraj	Dangal
2021	Imlie	Pallavi Thakur	StarPlus
2022	Sindoor Ki Keemat	Bitti	Dangal
2024	Anupamaa	Pakhi "Sweety" Shah	StarPlus

== Filmography ==
Year	Film	Co-star	Role	Director	Language	notes
2018	Ratham	Geetanand	Bujji	Chandrashekar Kanuri	Telugu	Debut
2019	Diksoochi	Dilip Kumar Salvadi	Brahma Dwara	Dilip Kumar Salvadi	Telugu	
