= Redrum (2018 film) =

2018 film by Dhruv Sachdev and Saurabh Bali

- Directed by: Dhruv Sachdev; Saurabh Bali
- Screenplay by: Dhruv Sachdev
- Story by: Dhruv Sachdev
- Based on: "The Tell-Tale Heart" by Edgar Allan Poe
- Produced by: Durgesh Paul; Varun Bhilwara
- Starring: Shakil Akhtar Imf; Saeeda Imtiaz; Tom Alter; Pawan Nagpal
- Music by: Anurag Mohan; Agastya; Aagman
- Production companies: Durgesh Paul Productions; Bhilwara Entertainment
- Release date: 10 August 2018 (India)
- Running time: 101 mins.
- Country: India
- Language: Hindi
- Box office: est. ₹4.00 lakh (US$4,200)

Redrum is a 2018 Indian Hindi-language psychological thriller film directed by Dhruv Sachdev and Saurabh Bali and starring Vibhav Roy, Saeeda Imtiaz, and Tom Alter. It is based on Edgar Allan Poe's The Tell-Tale Heart. Originally scheduled for release in January 2017, the release date was delayed following the 2016 Uri attack and the announcement by Maharashtra Navnirman Sena that they would not allow films featuring Pakistani actors to be screened. The film was ultimately released in August 2018 to poor critical reception.

== Plot ==
Daksh (Vibhav Roy) is a pub-singer in Delhi. He had a promiscuous mother who was often visited by her lovers and Daksh received several beatings from them. Daksh uses drugs as a way to get over his problematic past. One night after his performance, he meets Aarika (Saeeda Imtiaz) who likes his singing. They bond over drinks and soon form a relationship. However, Daksh turns violent in a combined effect of drugs and his past memories, only making Aarika leave him.

Eric Fernandes (Tom Alter), an Urdu poetry aficionado, is Head of the Narcotics Department and is nearing his retirement. His department arrests a drug peddler and retrieve a diary from him containing several names and contact numbers. Daksh's name is one among them. Fernandes wants to use him as an approver to arrest some big drug peddler. He approaches Aarika and convinces her to help him and Daksh.

== Cast ==
- Vibhav Roy as Daksh
- Saeeda Imtiaz as Aarika
- Tom Alter as Eric Fernandes
- Neha Kargeti as Chavi

== Production ==
The film is the directorial debut of Dhruv Sachdev and Saurabh Bali and is co-produced by Durgesh Paul Productions and Bhilwara Entertainment with Vibhav Roy, Pakistani actress Saeeda Imtiaz and Tom Alter in leading roles. It is based on Edgar Allan Poe's short story The Tell-Tale Heart (1843). Its teaser poster was released in October, 2016.

Principal photography was done in Delhi in 2015 and the film was scheduled for release in January 2017. However, following the 2016 Uri attack, India–Pakistan relations worsened and the Maharashtra Navnirman Sena (MNS) announced that they would not allow films featuring Pakistani actors to be screened. Imtiaz is a Pakistani actress, and due to her leading role in the film, producer Durgesh Paul was afraid about the film's release, stating: "I am worried if my film will see the light of day". Another film, Ae Dil Hai Mushkil (2016), produced by Karan Johar and featuring Fawad Khan in a lead role, could be screened after Johar promised to donate ₹5.00 crore (US$520,000) to the Indian Army Welfare Fund Battle Casualties. Seeing this, Paul was hopeful that he could have the film released if he donated 70% of his film's earning to the Prime Minister's National Relief Fund.

Paul declared that in place of Imtiaz, Alter would promote the film. Alter died on 29 September 2017 and his voice was dubbed by another artist. The film was promoted as his last completed film and was released in August 2018.

== Reception ==
Troy Ribeiro of the Indo-Asian News Service gave the film a 1.5 star rating and called it a sloppy representation of Poe's story. He felt that Roy is "sincere but fails to make an impression" while Imtiaz and Kargeti are "equally competent". He likened Alter's character to ACP Pradyuman of the television series CID and called his role a "miscasting". He found the writing "lethargic and mediocre", the plot "a half-baked attempt", and the background score "a bit jarring to the ears". However, he noted that the songs "Teri Kami" and "Imtihaan" fit the narrative and concluded his review by stating that the film could have been interesting had the directors not failed "to do justice to [the] subject" and the film seemed to be a "rehash of many skewed love stories".

Pallabi Dey Purkayastha of The Times of India was critical of the film, giving it 1 star out of 5, and noted that among the film's cast only Alter "[deserved] ... praise". She felt that the film did not adequately explore the various sub-plots and themes that do not help to advance the story, and wrote that the film was a "kind of mental torment that not even our worst enemies should be forced to endure". Writing for FilmFestivals.com, Syed Siraj gave the film a 1.5 star rating. He noted that the film "fails to engage ... at any stage" and the actors appeared amateurish, leaving Alter "all at sea" who "needed a better farewell on the screen than ... Redrum" and the film was "far from doing any service to [his] memory". He found Roy struggling throughout the film and Kargeti "passable".

According to the Indian film trade website Box Office India, the film had a limited release on 10 screens and a worldwide gross of est. ₹4.00 lakh (US$4,200), earning the label "disaster".
