= Tum Hi Ho Bandhu Sakha Tumhi =

- Genre: Family drama
- Created by: Shashi Mittal; Sumeet Hukamchand Mittal
- Directed by: Vikram Ghai K.K.Chauhan
- Starring: Neil Bhatt; Kabeer Kumar; Sreejita De; Chandni Bhagwanani; Vineet Raina; Dimple Jhangiani; Ravjeet Singh
- Country of origin: India
- Original language: Hindi
- No. of seasons: 1
- No. of episodes: 128

Production
- Producers: Shashi Mittal; Sumeet Hukamchand Mittal
- Production locations: Agra; Mumbai
- Camera setup: Multi-camera
- Production company: Shashi Sumeet Productions

Original release
- Network: Zee TV
- Release: 11 May – 30 October 2015

Tum Hi Ho Bandhu Sakha Tumhi is an Indian television series that aired from 11 May to 30 October 2015 on Zee TV. The show starred Neil Bhatt, Kabeer Kumar, Sreejita De and Chandini Bhagwanani in lead roles.

Tum Hi Ho Bandhu Sakha Tumhi is set in Agra and revolves around the Pethewala family and how they live as a joint family.

The show began with the working title Pethawala before being renamed Tum Hi Ho Bandhu Sakha Tumhi. It ended due to low ratings, and was replaced by Kaala Teeka.

From 17 July to 11 November 2016, it was rerun on Zee Anmol under the title Choti Bahu – Parivar Ki Jeevan Rekha.

== Plot ==
The story revolves around the Pethewala family.

Bhushan, the second son, is in love with Shreya. Before he can tell his family, they pretend to have arranged his marriage to someone else who turns out to be Shreya. They eventually marry and live happily.

Ajay, the youngest son of the Pethewala family, has a best friend named Ajju, who is in love with Sanjana. Ajju gets a job in the US, and he and Sanjana decide to marry due to her father's objections. However, since Ajju is just under 21, he cannot marry. To prevent Sanjana's father from forcibly marrying her off to someone else, Ajju asks Ajay to marry her temporarily until he returns from the US. Ajay marries Sanjana, but their families are unaware that their marriage is only a contract for a few months. The Pethewala family takes time to accept Sanjana. Sanjana feels alone and tries and fails to contact Ajju. However, she and Ajay slowly become closer.

Meanwhile, Shreya, influenced by her mother, tries to divide the household and take control. Sanjana uncovers Shreya's true intentions and threatens to expose her after Shreya and her mother's plots turns criminal.

When everyone accepted Ajay and Sanjana's marriage, Shreya reveals their contract marriage. Sanjana is thrown out of the house, and Trilokchand asks Ajay to get a divorce. However, Sanjana's father, who has come around to the marriage after Ajay and Sanjana save his life, helps her realize her love for Ajay. Although Ajay has feelings for Sanjana, but hides them, not wanting to hurt Ajju. Sanjana tries to win Ajay's love.

Meanwhile, Dadi sees through Shreya's deception and brings Sanjana back into the house, pretending to be a negative influence. Sanjana unites the family by making them fight her, and eventually exposes Shreya, including how she had recently hit Dadi. Bhushan throws Shreya out of the house and apologizes to Ajay and Sanjana.

Shreya attempts suicide by jumping off a cliff, but Bhushan saves her. However, she loses her vision and becomes blind. Regretful of her actions, Shreya asks the family for forgiveness, who all do so except for Bhushan.

Around the same time, Ajju returns from the US. Sanjana confronts him about his lack of communication, but Ajju tries to justify and immediately decides to marry her. However he learns that Ajay and Sanjana loves each other. He tries to take her away, but Ajay stops him and confesses his love for Sanjana, leading to a major fight between the friends. Ajju attempts to assault Sanjana, but Mishri intervenes, hitting Aju on the head with a vase, killing him. Mishri is terrified, and Ajay and Sanjana hide Ajju's body. The police later inform Trilokchand that they have found Ajju's body and consider the entire Pethewala family as suspects, with Ajay and Sanjana being the prime suspects. Meanwhile, in college, Mishri notices that she is being followed.

It is revealed that not only is Ajju still alive, but Shreya's suicide attempt was faked and a scheme devised by Shreya and her mother. Ajju, Shreya and her sister Shania work together to manipulate Mishri into thinking she is losing her mind. However, Ajay and Sanjana protect her.

Shreya fakes a pregnancy to stay in the family, but Bhushan becomes suspicious and uncovers her lies. Ajay and Mishri discover another man, Anuj, who claims to have fallen in love with Mishri at first sight. Anuj's family asks for Mishri's hand in marriage. On the day of the wedding, Sanjana is arrested for Ajju's murder. Sanjana confesses, and the only way Ajay can save her is by agreeing to marry Shaina. However, Bhushan arrives in time and exposes all the villains, ensuring that Sanjana and Ajay are finally married. Shreya, Ajay and Shaina are arrested. Sanjana then requests Bhushan to bail out Shreya and bring her back to the family for the last time, which he agrees to. Shreya apologises and Sanjana forgives her. Shreya watches everyone dancing together without her. The story ends with the entire family dancing and taking a selfie together.

== Cast ==
=== Main Cast ===
- Chandni Bhagwanani as Sanjana Ajay Pethewala: the wife of Ajay Pethewala and the Chachi of Samar.
- Kabeer Kumar as Ajay Pethewala: Trilokchand's and Elaichi's fourth son; the youngest brother of Amar, Bhushan and Aayush; and the elder brother of Utpal, Avni and Mishri. He is the Chachu of Samar and the husband of Sanjana.
- Neil Bhatt as Bhushan Trilokchand Pethewala: Trilokchand's and Elaichi's second son; the younger brother of Amar; and the elder brother of Aayush, Ajay, Utpal, Avni and Mishri. He is the Chachu of Samar and the husband of Shreya.
- Sreejita De as Shreya Bhushan Pethewala: the wife of Bhushan Pethewala and the Chachi of Samar.
- Dimple Jhangiani as Avni Pethewala: Trilokchand's and Elaichi's daughter; the youngest sister of Amar, Bhushan, Aayush, Ajay and Utpal; the elder sister of Mishri; and the Bua of Samar.
- Madhu Malti Kapoor as Dadi: the mother of Trilokchand; grandmother of Amar, Bhushan, Aayush, Ajay, Utpal, Avni and Mishri; and great-grandmother of Samar.
- Tushar Dalvi as Trilokchand Pethewala: the son of Malti; husband of Elaichi; father of Amar, Bhushan, Ayush, Ajay, Utpal, Avni and Mishri; and grandfather of Samar.
- Aishwarya Narkar as Elaichi Trilokchand Pethewala: the wife of Trilokchand; mother of Amar, Bhushan, Ayush, Ajay, Utpal, Avni and Mishri; and grandmother of Samar.
- Vineet Raina as Amar Pethewala: Trilokchand's and Elaichi's eldest son; the eldest brother of Bhushan, Ayush, Ajay, Utpal, Avni and Mishri; the husband of Vinati; and the father of Samar.
- Aalika Sheikh as Vinati Amar Pethewala: the wife of Amar Pethewala and mother of Samar.
- Rehaan Khan as Samar Amar Pethewala: Amar and Vinati's son; and the nephew of Bhushan, Ajay, Ayush, Utpal, Avni and Mishri.
- Mahesh Tanwar as Utpal Trilokchand Pethewala.
- Ravjeet Singh as Aayush Pethewala.
- Neha Dangal as Mishri Trilokchand Pethewala.

=== Recurring Cast ===
- Meinal Vedvikhyat as Shreya's mother.
- Amit Singh Thakur as Sanjana's father.
- Neeraj Goswani as Ajju.
- Lavina Tandon as Shaina, the fake sister of Ajju.
