= Best Friends Forever? =

Indian television series

- Directed by: Aniruddha; Vishal Bhosale
- Starring: Fenil Umrigar; Charlie Chauhan; Shritama Mukherjee; Yuvraj Thakur; Parth Samthaan; Lavin Gothi
- Composer: Shadaab Abhik
- Country of origin: India
- Original language: Hindi
- No. of episodes: 140

Production
- Producers: Prem Kishen Malhoyta; Sunil Mehta
- Running time: 30 minutes
- Production company: Cinevistaas Limited

Original release
- Network: Channel V India
- Release: 3 December 2012 – 25 May 2013

Best Friends Forever? (or BFF) is an Indian teen drama which aired on Channel V India from 3 December 2012, to 25 May 2013. The show ran for a total of 140 episodes and is loosely based on the American show Pretty Little Liars.

== Cast ==
=== Main ===
- Fenil Umrigar as Sanjana "Sanju" Roy
- Charlie Chauhan as Elakshi "Ela" Singh
- Shritama Mukherjee as Vinita "Vinnie" Maheshwari
- Parth Samthaan as Prithvi Sanyal
- Yuvraj Thakur as Varun Mittal
- Lavin Gothi as Makrand "Mak" Mahajan
- Nakul Roshan Sahdev as Purushastra Jajodiya, Vinnie's boyfriend

=== Recurring ===
- Abhilash Kumar as Rohan Sharma
- Rohit Saraf as Sahil Mehta, Sanju's friend/stalker
- Shravan Mehta as RGV Radhesham Gandharva Vasudevan, Ela, Sanju and Vinnie's classmate
- Imran Khan as Devashish Roy, Sanjana's father
- Khushboo Purohit as Pammi, Sanju, Ela, Vinnie, Varun and Mac's classmate
- Kishwer Merchant as Mandira Singh, Ela's mother
- Akash Maheshwari as Vinnie's brother
- Megha Chatterjee as Prof. Anu Shukla, Varun's sister, and Westwood Professor
