= Smriti Khanna =

Indian television actress

Smriti Khanna Gupta
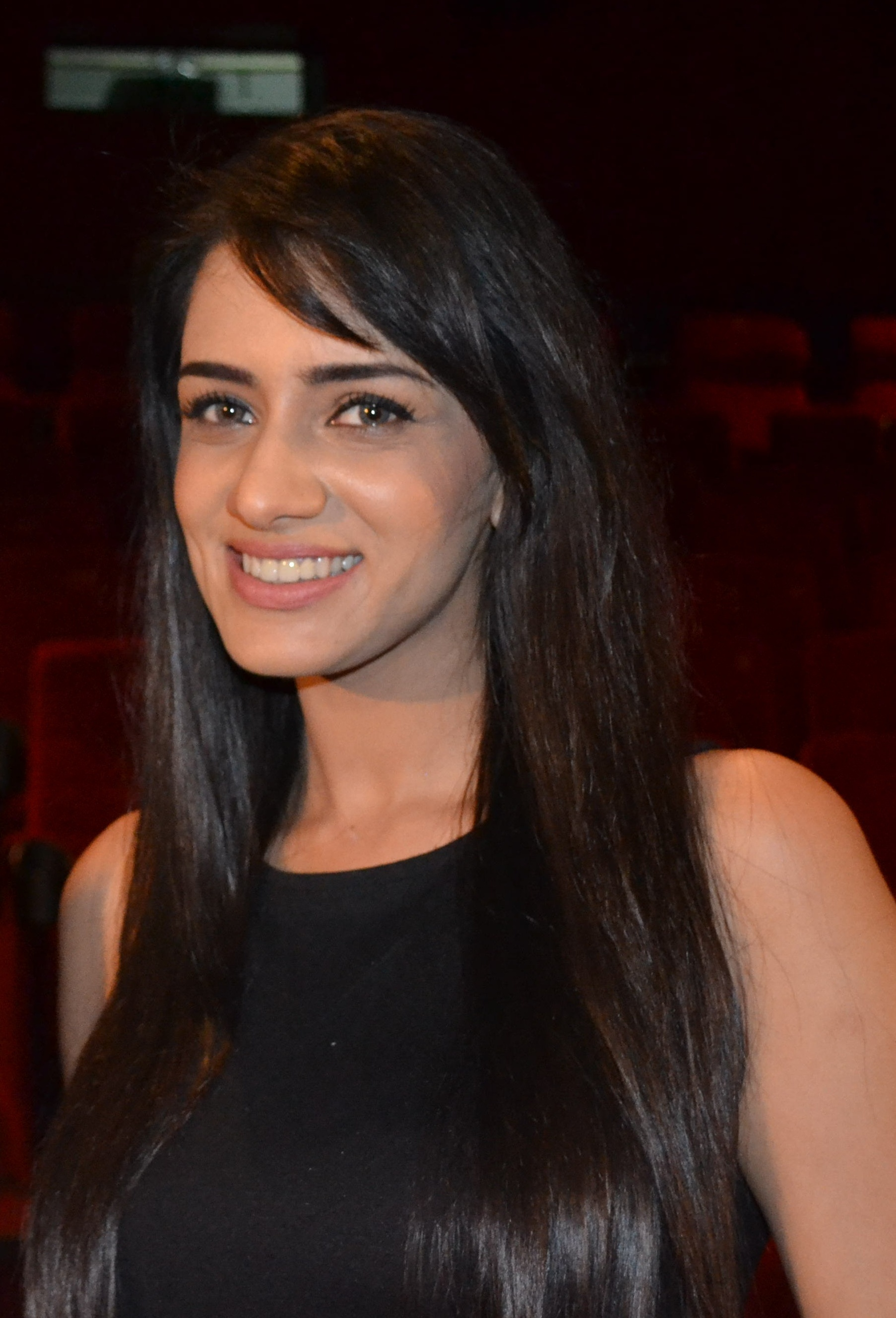
- Khanna in 2015
- Born: 6 July 1990 (age 36); Kozhikode, Kerala, India
- Occupations: Actress; Model
- Years active: 2013-Present
- Known for: It's Complicated; Meri Aashiqui Tum Se Hi; Iss Pyaar Ko Kya Naam Doon 3
- Spouse(s): Unknown (2012-2013); Gautam Gupta (m. 2017)
- Children: 2

Smriti Khanna (born 6 July 1982) is an Indian television actress and a former model. She is known for playing the role of Jo in Channel V's It's Complicated and Ritika Zaveri in Colors TV's Meri Aashiqui Tum Se Hi.

== Personal life ==
Smriti's first marriage was to her high school sweetheart at the age of 22-23 who later according to her was a smuggler who cheated and was abusive towards her, she claimed this as a horrific experience and they got divorced within a year. Later she married actor Gautam Gupta on 23 November 2017. Their first daughter was born on 15 April 2020. She announced her second pregnancy in April 2024 and the couple welcomed their second daughter on 5 September 2024.

== Career ==
In 2013, Khanna was seen in Punjabi film Jatt Airways. In February 2015, Khanna portrayed the role of Reeva in Yeh Hai Aashiqui. In the same year, she made a cameo appearance in Nadaniyaan. Khanna played the role of Ritika Zaveri in Meri Aashiqui Tum Se Hi. In June 2016, Khanna was hired to portray Vandana in Colors TV's Balika Vadhu. She later appeared in Kasam Tere Pyaar Ki as Malaika and Iss Pyaar Ko Kya Naam Doon 3 as Sasha.

== Filmography ==
=== Television ===
| Year | Title | Role | Notes | Ref. |
|---|---|---|---|---|
| 2013-2014 | It's Complicated | Jo | | |
| 2014-2016 | Meri Aashiqui Tum Se Hi | Ritika Zaveri | | |
| 2015 | Nadaniyaan | Unknown | | |
| 2015 | Yeh Hai Aashiqui | Reeva Khanna | Episodic role | |
| 2016 | C.I.D. | Sheetal | Episodic role | |
| 2016 | Box Cricket League 2 | Contestant | | |
| 2016 | SuperCops vs Supervillains | Nisha | | |
| 2016 | Balika Vadhu | Vandana Mittal | | |
| 2016-2017 | Kasam Tere Pyaar Ki | Malaika Malhotra | | |
| 2017 | Iss Pyaar Ko Kya Naam Doon 3 | Sasha | | |

=== Films ===
| Year | Title | Role | Notes | Ref. |
|---|---|---|---|---|
| 2013 | Jatt Airways | Sweety | Punjabi film | |
| 2022 | Dhappa | Kavita | Hungama original web series | |
