= Mulk (TV series) =

Indian television series

Mulk is an Indian television drama series based on the partition of India, portraying its effect on the lives of and relationships between three friends from Hindu, Muslim and Sikh background in Sheikhupura near Lahore Punjab Province . It was first broadcast on Zee TV as the centrepiece of its programming for Republic Day in 2003.

== Cast ==
- Shishir Sharma
- Jyoti Mukherjee
- Avinash Sahijwani
- Pooja Dadwal
- Rakesh Thareja
- Vineet Raina
- Lalit Parimoo
- Afzaal Khan
- Rajeev Bharadwaj
