= Kuch Toh Hai Tere Mere Darmiyaan =

Indian television series

- Genre: Serial drama
- Screenplay by: Sonali Jaffar; Fatima Rangeela; Nishchal Shome; Pawani Mehandiratta; Aayush Agrawal; Dialogues; Ritu Bhatia
- Directed by: Muzammil Desai
- Creative directors: Nivedita Basu; Aayush Agrawal
- Starring: Asha Negi; Shritama Mukherjee; Aly Goni; Vibhav Roy; Gautam Gupta; Shaheer Sheikh; Roopa Ganguly; Lalit Bisht; Ankita Sharma; Ritu Vij; Yash Tonk; Amrita Arora; Saurav Gurjar
- Country of origin: India
- Original language: Hindi
- No. of seasons: 1
- No. of episodes: 83

Production
- Executive producer: Aayush Agrawal
- Producers: Ekta Kapoor; Shobha Kapoor
- Camera setup: Multi-camera
- Running time: 22 minutes
- Production company: Balaji Telefilms

Original release
- Network: StarPlus
- Release: 28 September 2015 – 2 January 2016

Kuch Toh Hai Tere Mere Darmiyaan (transl. There Is Something Between You and Me) is an Indian serial drama television series, which aired on Star Plus from 28 September 2015 to 2 January 2016, ending after 83 episodes. It was re-broadcast on Star Utsav in February 2020.

Produced by Balaji Telefilms, the series was based on The Book of Life and starred Gautam Gupta, Asha Negi and Aly Goni in lead roles. Asha Negi replaced actress Shritama Mukherjee and Aly Goni replaced Vibhav Roy, in lead roles. The series is about love and friendship and starts in Jamshedpur.

== Summary ==
Koyal is a young woman from Jamshedpur who believes that there are two types of people: people who live for someone, and people whom they live for. Madhavan, Raj and Koyal are best friends. Madhavan (Maddy) is the best student in the town, hard-working and caring. He is in love with Koyal and can do anything for her happiness. Raj is a flirt and dreams of becoming a movie star. Koyal is in love with Raj and she does everything for him.

At an annual function, a famous director insults Raj and selects Koyal as his heroine. Raj tells Koyal that she can never be a star. Koyal decides to go to Mumbai to prove Raj wrong, but at the last moment, Raj stops Koyal by faking an injury. Maddy is upset for Koyal.

However, Raj and Koyal, even after facing so many difficulties, fall in love with each other. But, destiny has other things written for them when Raj gets framed in Shubhod's "Shubho" murder. Shubho was actually pushed off the terrace by Samar, for having discovered the latter's conspiracies. Raj is unable to prove his truth and is sent to Jail for Shubho's murder.

Later, Koyal's sister, Taani's marriage is fixed with Maddy's brother Surya and Koyal's parents want her to marry Maddy. When Koyal tells Maddy she doesn't want to get engaged, a selfless Maddy breaks off the alliance himself. Koyal learns that Taani being an adopted child and shares it with Raj. During Taani's engagement ceremony, Raj discloses the truth to everyone and Surya calls off the engagement. Koyal is upset with Raj and tells him that she never wants to see his face not realising that Taani was in on the plan with Raj.

Maddy proposes to Koyal who finally tells him that she loves Raj. When Koyal learns about Taani and Raj's plan, she brings Raj home and says that she wants to marry him. Raj also admits that he loves Koyal. Their alliance is fixed but Koyal's parents are not happy. They try to break the alliance and make Koyal patch up with Maddy. There is something which Koyal's parents are hiding and no one knows about it. It's revealed that Koyal is the adopted child and not Taani. Koyal is really Taani and Taani is really Koyal.

The story ends with Koyal reuniting with Maddy.

== Cast ==
=== Main ===
- Shritama Mukherjee / Asha Negi as Koyal Ghosh
- Gautam Gupta as Madhavan "Maddy" Venkat
- Vibhav Roy / Aly Goni as Raj Kapoor

=== Recurring ===
- Ankita Sharma as Vidya Venkat
- Lalit Bisht as Samar Oberoi
- Ritu Vij as Vedika
- Prianca Sharma Taani Ghosh
- Roopa Ganguly as Leela Venkat
- Shagun Sharma as Sanjana "Sanju" Kapoor
- Zeeshan Khan as Shubhod "Shubho" Ghosh
- Amrita Arora as Dhami
- Divyanka Tripathi as Ishita
- Ahmad Harhash as Ritu Singh
