= Shritama Mukherjee =

Indian television actress (born 1993)

- Born: 3 November 1993 (age 32); Kota, Rajasthan, India
- Other name: Shri
- Occupation: Actress
- Years active: 2011–present
- Known for: Roles of Rajkumari Jaynandini in Dekha Ek Khwaab; Vinita 'Vinnie' Maheshwari in Best Friend Forever; Vedika Vidhaan Nayak in Do Dil Ek Jaan

Shritama Mukherjee (born 3 November 1993) is an Indian former television actress. She is best known for her portrayal of Rajkumari Jainandini in the show Dekha Ek Khwaab and Koyal in Kuch Toh Hai Tere Mere Darmiyaan. Mukherjee played the role of Mahi in Tashan-e-Ishq. In 2025, Shritama appeared in a music video ‘Sohbatein’ alongside Kumar Sanu and Akriti Kakkar.

== Early life and career ==
Shritama is from a Bengali family she was born and brought up in Kota in Rajasthan. She dropped out of school and moved to Mumbai to pursue a career in acting.

Shritama made her debut with Sony TV's serial Dekha Ek Khwaab in 2011, where she played the role of Rajkumari Jainandini.

She played the role of Vinnie (Vinita) in Best Friends Forever? telecast on Channel V.

In May 2015 she played the role of Vedika in Do Dil Ek Jaan telecast on Life OK. She was also seen on Channel V show Yeh Jawani Ta Ra Ri Ri and in Gustakh Dil on Life OK.

She made her film debut with Soombe, a Tulu film directed by Saikrishna Kudla released on 13 March 2015 all around Tulunadu.

In 2016 she was cast in the role of Mahi in Tashan-e-Ishq.

== Television ==
Year	Shows	Role	Channel	Notes
2011–2012	Dekha Ek Khwaab	Rajkumari Jainandini	Sony TV	Main Female Antagonist
2012–2013	Best Friends Forever?	Vinita 'Vinnie' Maheshwari	Channel V	Main Female Lead Role
2013–2014	Do Dil Ek Jaan	Vedika Vidhaan Nayak	Life OK	Main Female Lead Role
2014	Yeh Jawani Ta Ra Ri Ri	Kimaya	Channel V	Main Female Lead Role
2014	Gustakh Dil	Jasmine	Life OK	Main Female Antagonist
2015	Kalash - Ek Vishwaas	Sakshi Deol	Life OK	Parallel Lead Role
2015	Kuch Toh Hai Tere Mere Darmiyaan	Koyal Ghosh	Star Plus	Main Female Lead Role
2016	Tashan-e-Ishq	Mahi Taneja/ Mahi Yuvraj Luthra/ Devika Khanna	Zee TV	Parallel Lead
2017	Ek Vivah Aisa Bhi	Sonali	&TV	
2018	Kaun Hai?		Colors TV	Episodic Role
2025	Mangal Lakshmi	Vishkanya	Colors TV	
