= Guppedantha Prema =

- Directed by: Vinod Lingala
- Written by: Vinod Lingala
- Produced by: Eye Wink Productions
- Starring: Sai Ronak; Aditi Singh
- Cinematography: Sanjay Loknath
- Edited by: Basava Paidireddy
- Music by: Navneeth Sundar
- Release date: 17 June 2016
- Country: India
- Language: Telugu

Guppedantha Prema (transl. Heart full of Love) is a 2016 Indian Telugu-language romantic drama film written and directed by Vinod Lingala. The film stars Sai Ronak, Aditi Singh (Telugu debut) with Aishwarya in a supporting role. Navneeth Sundar composed the film's music. The film released on 17 June 2016 worldwide.

== Cast ==
- Sai Ronak as Yuv
- Aditi Singh as Sandy
- Aishwariyaa Bhaskaran as Swara
- Abhilash as Raja, Swara's Friend
- Naveen Neni as Mukesh, Yuv's Friend
- Anand as Sandy's Father
- Noel Sean as Abhi, Book Reader
- Shraddhha Pancholie as Sandy's Mother
- Pratheek as Yuv's friend

== Production ==
Aditi Singh, aged eighteen, made her debut with this film and lost thirty-five kilograms for her role in the film. The film was shot in fifty-eight days in Cherrapunji, Hyderabad, Meghalaya, parts of Northeast India and Shillong.

== Soundtrack ==
The music was composed by Navneeth Sundar, who previously composed for the Malayalam film Buddy (2013). A writer from The Hindu wrote that "For ‘Sakhiya Sakhiya’, Navneeth ropes in Vandana Srinivasan, who is absolutely brilliant with her rendition of the gorgeous melody".

Track listing
No.	Title	Singer(s)	Length
1.	"Naalo Alajadedho"	Navneeth Sundar, Shashaa Tirupati, Shailaja Babu	3:42
2.	"Tere Dil Se"	Ranjith	3:33
3.	"Yedha Loyallo"	Karthik, Shashaa Tirupati	4:24
4.	"Udayame Na Asha"	Nivas	2:15
5.	"Sakhiya Sakhiya"	Vandana Srinivasan	4:41
6.	"Di Do Di Do"	Priya Himesh	3:40
7.	"Gaayamai Maanuna"	Abhijith Rao	2:43
8.	"Kanule Kalaga"	Navneeth Sundar	2:38
9.	"Sakhiya Sakhiya (unplugged version)"	—	3:59
Total length:			31:35
