= Karan Agarwal =

Indian writer

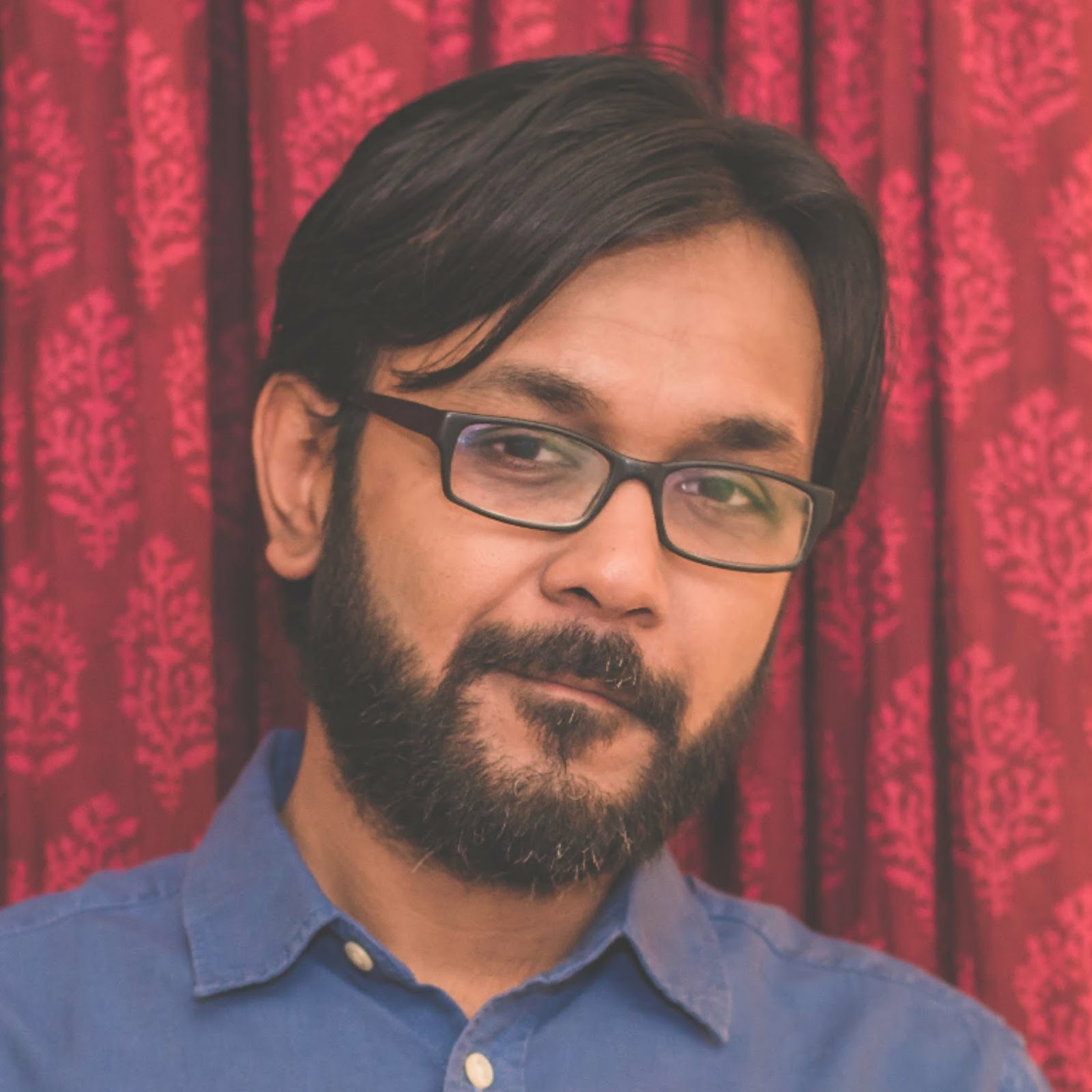
- Karan Agarwal
- Born: Mumbai
- Occupations: Writer, creative director
- Years active: 2004–present
- Spouse: Serena Menon

Karan Agarwal (born 23 June 1983) is an Indian writer, director, creative director, and presenter known for work in television, web series, digital advertising and podcasts. He has worked on popular youth shows like Selection Day (TV series), Laakhon Mein Ek, Gumrah: End of Innocence, The Suite Life of Karan & Kabir, Kya Mast Hai Life and Bigg Boss. He is the creator and host of podcasts Adventures of Cheap Beer and Eat Sleep Joke Repeat.

== Work ==
Writer

- Kya Mast Hai Life (2009–2010)
- The Suite Life of Karan & Kabir (2010–2013)
- Wordmatch (2012)
- Yeh Jawani Ta Ra Ri Ri (2014)
- Galli Galli Sim Sim (2014)
- Gumrah: End of Innocence (2015)
- Laakhon Mein Ek (2017)
- Shaitaan Haveli (2017)
- Selection Day (TV series) (2018)

Creative director

- Bigg Boss (2006–2007)
- POGO Amazing Kids Awards (2007)
- Champion Chaalbaaz No.1 (2007–2008)
- Gumrah: End of Innocence (2015)

Creator

- Champion Chaalbaaz No.1 (2007–2008)
- Jo Jeeta Wohi Super Star (2008)

Podcasts

- Adventures of Cheap Beer (2015–2016)
- Eat Sleep Joke Repeat (2016)
