= Yam Hain Hum =

Indian sitcom series

- Genre: Fantasy; Comedy
- Written by: Amit Senchoudhary; Nitin Keswani; Shailendra R. Kumar; Rishabh Sharma
- Directed by: Rajan Waghdhare
- Creative director: Rishi Srivastava
- Starring: See below
- Country of origin: India
- Original language: Hindi
- No. of seasons: 1
- No. of episodes: 283

Production
- Producers: Siddharth Tewary; Gayatri Gill Tewary
- Running time: 24 minutes
- Production company: Swastik Pictures

Original release
- Network: SAB TV
- Release: 15 December 2014 – 15 January 2016

Yam Hain Hum is an Indian fantasy situation comedy on SAB TV. It starred Manav Gohil, Atul Parchure, Fenil Umrigar and Debina Bonnerjee.

== Plot ==
In his home in Yamlok, Yamraj, the god of death, discovers that the people on Earth misunderstand him as a scary villain who takes away lives. Determined to show everyone that he has a good soul, Yam descends to Delhi from Heaven with Chitragupt, the god who tracks whether the deeds humans do during their life are good or bad.

== Cast ==
=== Main ===
- Manav Gohil as Yamraj
- Fenil Umrigar/Debina Bonnerjee as Dhurmona
- Atul Parchure as Chitragupt

=== Recurring ===
- Indresh Malik as Baldev Kapoor
- Bharati Kumar as Sheena
- Rini Chandra as Riya Chaudhary
- Ashcharya Shetty as Bindiya Kapoor
- Rashmi Gupta /Farhina Parvez as Shikha Kapoor
- Anirudh Dave as Laalu Singh/Bhayyaji
- Raju Kher as Papaji/Satyajeet Kapoor
- Ranvierr Chahal as Kishore insurance
- Niharika Kundra as Manju Chaudhary
- Alekh Sangal as Chaman
- Aashutosh semwal as Rohit
- Perneet Chauhan as Jhelo
- Sunayana Fozdar as Monika
- Neyha Sharma as Divya
- Deepshikha Nagpal as Badi Bindu
- Vikas Grover as Chunky
- Piya Chaubey as Tina
- Rocky Verma as Director
- Jitender Singh Chaudhary as Jewellery Thief
- Samiksha Bhatnagar as Parampara
- Jiten Mukhi as College Principal
- Fenil Umrigar as Sridevi / Dhumorna
- Tiao Sadhil Kapoor as Chota Narad
- Simple Kaul as Iravati Shobhavati
- Kajal Jain as Nandini Shobhavati
- V.I.P. Comedian as himself
- Rajkumar Kanojia as Fake Blind Man
- Vijay D Baldani as Narada
- Navina Bole as Meneka
