= Vineet Raina =

Indian television actor

- Born: 30 August; Srinagar, Jammu & Kashmir, India
- Occupation: Actor
- Years active: 2003–present
- Spouses: Tanushree Kaushal (m. 2009; div. 2011); Apeksha Raina (m. 2023)

Vineet Raina (born 30 August) is an Indian Hindi film and television actor.

== Early life ==
Raina was born in Srinagar in the erstwhile Indian state of Jammu and Kashmir into a Kashmiri Pandit family.

== Television ==
| Year | Serial | Role | Notes |
|---|---|---|---|
| 2003 | Mulk | Kuldeep Kulbhushan Malhotra | |
| 2004–2005 | Tum Bin Jaaoon Kahaan | Dhruv | |
| 2005 | Sinndoor Tere Naam Ka | Anurag | |
| 2006 | Sati...Satya Ki Shakti | Aarth Razdan | |
| 2006 | Sanyasi | Nandkishor | |
| 2006 | Vaidehi | Yashvardhan "Yash" Jaisingh | |
| 2007–2008 | Maryada... of an Indian family | Krishna "Krish" Singh | |
| 2007–2008 | Har Ghar Kuch Kehta Hai | Akshay Thakral | |
| 2007–2008 | Maayka | Veer Khurana | |
| 2008 | Ssshhhh...Koi Hai | Dr. Gaurav Sharma | Season 2; Episodes 126-127 |
| 2008-2009 | Nach Baliye 4 | Contestant | |
| 2009 | Dhoop Mein Thandi Chaav...Maa | Akshar | |
| 2010 | Do Hanson Ka Jodaa | Vinay | |
| 2010 | Godh Bharaai | Ajay | Cameo |
| 2012 | Punar Vivah | Prashant Satyendra Dubey | |
| 2012 | Adaalat | Debojit Sarkar | Episodic appearance |
| 2013 | Yeh Hai Mohabbatein | Mihir Arora | |
| 2013 | Yeh Hai Aashiqui - Season 1 (Episode 1: Tasveer) | Manoj Mehra | |
| 2014 | Ishq Kills | Karan | Episode 1 |
| 2014 | Lapataganj - Ek Baar Phir | Lakhan / Bajrang Bajpayee | |
| 2015–2016 | Udaan | Arjun Khanna | |
| 2015 | Bhanwar | Shekhar | Episodic appearance |
| 2015 | Tum Hi Ho Bandhu Sakha Tumhi | Amar Pethawala | |
| 2015–2016 | Begusarai | Bhanu Pratap Singh | |
| 2016 | Box Cricket League 2 | Contestant | Player in Lucknow Nawabs |
| 2016–2017 | Kaala Teeka | Dewri | |
| 2017 | Pardes Mein Hai Mera Dil | Rehan Khurana | |
| 2017–2019 | Ishq Mein Marjawan | Inspector Lakshya Pradhan / ACP Virat Raichand | |
| 2018 | Silsila Badalte Rishton Ka | Guest | |
| 2020 | Meri Gudiya | Rahu | |
| 2021–2022 | Choti Sarrdaarni | Paramjeet Singh Gill | |
| 2022 | Ali Baba: Dastaan-E-Kabul | Qasim | |
| 2023 | Dil Diyaan Gallaan | Rohan | |
| 2024 | Yeh Rishta Kya Kehlata Hai | Dev Shekhawat | |
| 2025 | Shirdi Wale Sai Baba | Sai Baba | |

=== Films ===
- Janani as Rahul (lead role), produced by Ultra Distributors Pvt. Ltd
- The Sholay Girl (2019), released on ZEE5 Premium OTT platform

=== Webseries ===
- Kasak (2020), lead role, released on ULLU OTT platform
  - Nominated in the Best Actor award category at Filmfare OTT Awards 2020 for performance in Kasak, based on a true story
