= Rajaa Betaa =

Indian television soap opera

- Also known as: Raja Beta
- Written by: Sanjay Kumar, Arundhati Sharma, Manu Sharma
- Screenplay by: Arundhati Sharma
- Starring: See below
- Country of origin: India
- Original language: Hindi
- No. of seasons: 1
- No. of episodes: 214

Production
- Camera setup: Multi-camera
- Running time: 20 minutes
- Production company: Sobo Films Private Limited

Original release
- Network: Zee TV
- Release: 15 January – 1 November 2019

Rajaa Betaa was an Indian television series created by Sobo Films Private Limited. It aired on Zee TV. It starred Rrahul Sudhir, Dishank Arora, Shambhabana Mohantey and Pranali Ghogare in lead roles. it was later replaced by Dil Yeh Ziddi Hai.

== Plot ==
Dr. Vedant Tripathi is a successful gynaecologist, but life is not easy for him as he has not been accepted yet by his family.

== Cast ==
=== Main ===
- Rrahul Sudhir / Dishank Arora as Dr. Vedant Tripathi - Poorva's husband; Ramesh and Manjula's adoptive son; Sanju's brother
- Shambhabana Mohantey / Pranali Ghogare as Poorva Tripathi - Vedant's wife; Pankhuri's elder sister; Rahul's ex-fiancée
- Fenil Umrigar as Pankhuri Mishra (antagonist) - in love with Vedant / Poorva's sister

=== Recurring ===
- Jatin Arora as Sanju Tripathi - Ramesh and Manjula's son; Vedant's brother; Pankhuri's fiance(2019)
- Mahjabeen Ali as Sumati Tripathi - Narendra's wife; Radhika's mother (2019)
- Reshma Merchant as Manjula Tripathi - wife of Ramesh; Vedant's adoptive mother; Sanju's mother (2019)
- Sharan Preet Kaur as Gomti Tripathi - Urmila's daughter; Ramesh and Narendra's sister (2019)
- Akansha Bhalla as Radhika - Narendra and Sumati's daughter; Vedant and Sanju's cousin (2019)
- Sarvesh Vyas as Narendra Tripathi - Urmila's son; Sumati's husband; Radhika's father; Ramesh and Gomti's brother(2019)
- Manoj Verma as Shiva (2019)
- Jasmeet Kaur as Parvati (2019)
- Ankit Bhardwaj as Rahul (antagonist) - Poorva's ex-boyfriend / ex-fiancé
- Anil Mishra/Sagar Saini as Ramesh Tripathi (antagonist) - Urmila's eldest son; Manjula's husband; Gomti and Narendra's elder brother; Vedant's adoptive father; Sanju's father
- Geeta Udeshi as Urmila Tripathi (Dadi) - Ramesh, Narendra and Gomti's mother; Radhika, Sanju and Vedant's grandmother
