= Shaitani Rasmein =

Indian television series

- Genre: Fantasy; Thriller; Horror
- Created by: Nikhil Sinha
- Directed by: Nikhil Sinha
- Starring: Naqiyah Haji; Vibhav Roy; Shefali Jariwala; Sumit Singh
- Country of origin: India
- Original language: Hindi
- No. of seasons: 2
- No. of episodes: 303

Production
- Producer: Nikhil Sinha
- Camera setup: Multi camera
- Running time: 20-22 minutes
- Production company: Triangle Film Company

Original release
- Network: Star Bharat
- Release: 15 January 2024 – 4 January 2025

Shaitani Rasmein is an Indian Hindi-language romantic horror fantasy series that premiered on 15 January 2024 on Star Bharat. It is digitally available on Disney+ Hotstar. The first season starred Naqiyah Haji and Vibhav Roy as leads. Sumit Singh and Reyaansh Vir Chdha played the lead roles in the second season.

== Plot ==
Nikki, an orphan from Goa, marries Piyush and is taken to Bhurangarh, where his royal family secretly worships the demon Malik. She is forced to perform the Shaitani Rasmein—dark rituals meant to restore Malik’s power—under deception and pressure. As deaths and supernatural events unfold, Nikki learns that Piyush’s ancestor made a blood pact with Malik, binding generations of daughters-in-law to serve him. Despite resisting, Nikki continues the rituals to protect the family, unknowingly strengthening Malik while slowly discovering her own hidden divine connection.

Kapalika, Malik’s devoted but jealous follower, drives much of the early conflict. She ensures Nikki completes the rituals, orchestrates sacrifices, and eliminates anyone who threatens Malik. However, when Malik declares Nikki as the “Chosen One,” Kapalika’s jealousy intensifies. She later discovers that Nikki is the reincarnation of Swarnaprabha, a divine being destined to destroy Malik. Her growing obsession and independent actions lead to her downfall, as Malik turns her into stone. Through Kapalika’s arc, the truth about Nikki’s identity and her divine purpose begins to surface.

As Nikki embraces her destiny, the story reveals the past of Swarnaprabha and Akaal Shatru—Malik’s original human form. In ancient times, Akaal Shatru sought immortality and targeted Swarnaprabha, a powerful divine entity. To stop him, Nikki travels back in time and witnesses their story, even influencing events by bringing Swarnaprabha and Piyush’s past incarnation, Kadam, together. Despite her efforts, Akaal Shatru nearly succeeds in becoming immortal, leading to his transformation into Malik. Nikki ultimately intervenes in the past and disrupts this process, but the battle results in her own death. Around this phase, she also faces Chhaya, Malik’s dangerous sister, and defeats her through strategy. Netra, Kapalika’s sister, is introduced as a rising dark force who will later continue the legacy of evil.

Before the final war, Nikki gathers divine artifacts and unlocks her true identity. Through the Arth Swarn Pustika and deep meditation, she fully transforms into Swarnaprabha, regaining her complete divine powers. Alongside Piyush, who becomes the Naagdevta Takshak, she prepares for a final battle against Malik. However, the battle ends tragically—Piyush sacrifices himself to save Nikki, and in a moment of immense rage and divine awakening, Nikki unleashes her full power and destroys Malik. Though victorious, she later dies, and her powers are preserved by Baaldevi for the future.

Twenty-one years later, their daughter Pinni grows up away from Bhurangarh, unaware of her past, until Malik reincarnates as Veer. Through manipulation by Netra, Pinni is married to Veer as part of a plan to complete Malik’s rebirth. She is forced to perform dark rituals just like Nikki, but soon uncovers the truth about her parents, her lineage, and her destiny as a Shatbeeja. With guidance from Baaldevi and her grandparents, Pinni learns that Nikki had hidden Swarnaprabha’s divine powers inside a sacred prism located within a mystical dimension called Brahmantar. As Malik regains strength and eliminates his enemies, Pinni embarks on a dangerous journey involving ancient libraries, riddles, supernatural realms, and deadly entities to locate Brahmantar before Malik can claim the powers for himself.

In the climax, Pinni discovers that Brahmantar is hidden within the palace itself, activated at the site where Nikki once placed a divine idol. As Malik confronts her and tries to stop her, Pinni enters Brahmantar and absorbs Swarnaprabha’s divine energy, fully awakening her true form. With her powers restored, she fights Malik in a final battle and destroys him permanently, ending generations of terror and breaking the curse on the Gehlot family. With Malik gone, Nikki and Swarnaprabha’s souls attain peace, and Pinni accepts her role as their successor. She steps forward not just as a survivor, but as a protector, eventually entering Brahmantar to eliminate remaining evil forces and restore balance to the world.

== Cast ==
=== Main ===
- Naqiyah Haji as
  - Nikki Singh Gehlot: Swarnaprabha's Reincarnation; Piyush's wife; Maalik's enemy; Pinni's mother; Creator of Brahmantar (2024) (dead)
  - Swarnaprabha: World's most powerful fairy; Akaal Shatru's enemy; Kadam's love interest (2024) (dead)
- Vibhav Roy as
  - Piyush Singh Gehlot: Kadam's Reincarnation; Vikram and Sumitra's younger son; Pratik's brother; Nikki's husband; Pinni's father (2024) (dead)
  - Kadam: Piyush's previous birth; Akaal Shatru's Commander in Chief; Swarnaprabha's love interest (2024) (dead)
  - Akaal Shatru: Maalik's body vessel (2024) (dead)
  - Naagdevtha Takshak: Head of Sarpali (2024)
- Sumit Singh as Pinni Singh Gehlot: Nikki and Piyush's daughter; Vikram and Sumitra's granddaughter; Veer's wife; Swarnaprabha's successor(2024–2025)
- Reyaansh Vir Chadha: Jackie, a Tantrik; Pinni's Protector (2024–2025)
- Siddhant Issar as
  - Maalik aka Akaal Shatru: The evil entity worshipped in Bhurangarh; Chhaya-Maaya's younger brother; Swarnaprabha's enemy; Nikki's mortal enemy; Pinni's enemy (2024-2025) (dead)
  - Veer Raizada: Maalik's reincarnation; Pinni's husband (2024)

=== Recurring ===
- Chandan K Anand as Vikram Singh Gehlot: Sumitra's husband; Pratik and Piyush's father; Pinni's grandfather (2024–2025) (dead)
- Richa Soni as Sumitra Devi Gehlot: Vikram's wife; Pratik and Piyush's mother; Pinni's grandmother (2024–2025)
- Priom Gujjar / Aniruddh Singh as Pratik Singh Gehlot: Vikram and Sumitra's elder son; Piyush's brother; Aarohi's husband (2024) (dead)
- Surbhi Shukla as Aarohi Singh Gehlot: Pratik's widow (2024)
- Kamal Krishna Poudial as Bhavani Singh: A priest; former guard of the Gehlot family (2024–2025)
- Hazel Shah as Baaldevi: Nikki and Pinni's protective goddess (2024–2025)
- Shefali Jariwala as Kapalika: A Yakshini; Netra's sister, Maalik's assistant and lover (2024) (dead)
- Nikita Sharma as Saudamini: a researcher; Maalik's assistant; a runaway criminal (2024)
- Neha Jha as Rachna: Gehlot family's maid (2024)
- Sreejita De as
  - Chhaya: A wicked Daayan; Maalik's elder sister; Maaya's twin sister (2024) (dead)
  - Maaya: A good Daayan; Maalik's elder sister; Chhaya's twin sister (2024) (dead)
- Swati Sharma as
  - Netra: A Nazariya chudail; Kapalika's sister; Maalik's assistant (2024) (dead)
  - Netra Raizada: Siddhart's wife; Veer and Ruhi's sister-in-law
- Amardeep Garg as Raka/Shakaal; Tantrik; Netra's assistant (2024)
- Shilpa Naik as Rakshoti (2024)
- Akshita Arora as Sugna Mai: Gehlot family's priestess (2024-2025) (dead)
- Mairina Singh as Ruhi; Veer's sister (2024) (dead)
- Prakash verma as Darpan ;journalist(2024)
- Simmi Dixitt as Kaalika Pishachini (2024) (dead)
- Deepali Saini as Narmunda Pishachini; Mayuraditya's wife; Queen of Kapaals; Maalik's enemy (2024)
- Ramnitu Chaudary as Visarpi; Goddess of Sarpali; Kadam/Piyush's obsessive one-sided lover; Swarnaprabha's enemy (2024)
- Lala Naren Pandey as Sapera of Sarpali (2024)
- Sakshi Trivedi as Yaksh (2024) (dead)
- Annapurna Vitthal as Sister Anita: Nikki's governess (2024) (dead)
- Jyoti Yadav as Veronica: Nikki's childhood friend; Piyush's obsessive one-sided lover (2024) (dead)
- Praneet Bhat as Janjal betal (2024) (dead)
- Shuman Das as Bakaar; Maalik's assistant (2024)

== Production ==
=== Release ===
Shefali Jariwala, Vibhav Roy and Naqiyah Haji were signed as the leads. The first promo was released in December 2023.

=== Development ===
The series was announced by Triangle Film Company on Star Bharat. It is a live action adaptation of Drishyam Comics series "Devil's Play" from the app Pratilipi Comics.

=== Filming ===
Principal photography for the show began in December 2023.

== See also ==
- List of programs broadcast by Star Bharat
