= Vibhav Roy =

Indian actor and model

- Born: 11 November 1993 (age 32); Delhi, India
- Occupations: Actor; Model
- Years active: 2013–present
- Website: Instagram

Vibhav Roy is an Indian actor and model.He made his acting debut in Life OK’s show Gustakh Dil. Vibhav started as a model and has been in TV commercials for well known brands such as Hindware, Suzuki Connect, Philips and Olay among others. He was recently seen playing the memorable character Itaat Khan in the highly controversial yet acclaimed movie Padmaavat, alongside Ranveer Singh.

== Career ==
Vibhav started his career playing the main lead in Gustakh Dil on Life OK. He essayed the character of Nikhil, a suave educated businessman hailing from an affluent family who falls for a homely girl from a village. The show ran for 16 months and was quite a hit with the masses. With the show ending on a high, he portrayed the lead role of Ishaan in Zee TV’s Doli Armaano Ki. The success of this show paved the way for him to work on Ekta Kapoor’s Kuch Toh Hai Tere Mere Darmiyaan on Star TV. He quit the show within three months of joining getting replaced by Aly Goni and the show fizzled out due to low TRPs soon after.

After working in television for three years, he got a break in movies when he was approached for Padmaavat. He played the role of Itaat Khan in Sanjay Leela Bhansali's magnum opus. Thereon, he depicted the character of 'Fahd Khan' in Sony Pictures release Lashtam Pashtam, which released on August 11, 2018.

== Filmography ==
=== Films ===
Year	Title	Role
2018	Padmaavat	Itaat Khan
2018	Redrum - A Tale of Murder	Daksh
2018	Lashtam Pashtam	Fahd Khan

=== Web shows ===
Year	Title	Role
2016	TVF - The Making of a Star Son	Polaris Kapoor
2019	Fuh se Fantasy	Luke
2019; 2021	Hello Mini	Nivaan

=== Television ===
Year	Title	Role
2013–2014	Gustakh Dil	Nikhil Bhardwaj
2014–2015	Doli Armaano Ki	Ishaan Sinha
2015	Kuch Toh Hai Tere Mere Darmiyaan	Raj Kapoor
2023	Meri Saas Bhoot Hai	Som
2024	Shaitani Rasmein	Piyush Gehlot
