= Aniruddh Singh =

Indian television actor

- Occupation: Actor
- Years active: 2011–present

Aniruddh Singh is an Indian television actor. Currently, he played the role of Dr. Anurag Arora in Sasural Simar Ka on Colors TV.

== Career ==
Aniruddh made his television debut with Chhajje Chhajje Ka Pyaar as Daksh Tripathi on Sony TV. He also appeared in Mann Kee Awaaz Pratigya as Adarsh Saxena and Saraswatichandra as Sunny. He also played a negative role in Hum Ne Li Hai- Shapath as Tamas- a scientist

== Television ==
- 2007 Khwaish as Riaz Zardari
- 2011 Chhajje Chhajje Ka Pyaar as Daksh Tripathi
- 2011–2012 Mann Kee Awaaz Pratigya as Adarsh Saxena
- 2013 Saraswatichandra as Sunny
- 2013 Shapath as Tamas
- 2014;15 Sasural Simar Ka as Dr. Anurag Arora
- 2024 Shaitani Rasmein as Pratik Singh Gehlot
