= Go (2007 film) =

- Theatrical Poster
- Directed by: Manish Srivastav
- Written by: Arshad Sayed
- Produced by: Ram Gopal Varma
- Starring: Gautam Gupta; Priyanka Kothari; Rajpal Yadav; Kay Kay Menon; Ravi Kale; Shereveer Vakil; Govind Namdeo; Shazad Latif
- Music by: Sneha Khanwalkar
- Release date: 5 October 2007
- Running time: 110 minutes
- Country: India
- Language: Hindi

Go is a 2007 Indian Hindi-language film starring Gautam Gupta, Priyanka Kothari and Kay Kay Menon in the lead roles. It is directed by Manish Srivastav and produced by Ram Gopal Varma.

== Synopsis ==
Abhay (Gautam Gupta) and Vasundhara (Priyanka Kothari) are neighbors who are in love. Due to strong opposition from their parents, they decide to elope to Goa. Meanwhile, Chief Minister Arjun Patil (Ravi Kale) has his Deputy Chief Minister Praveen Deshpande (Govind Namdeo) murdered, the planning of which is audio-taped by his assistant Bihari. Bihari then decides to blackmail the Chief Minister (CM), whose men eventually kill Bihari but not before he drops the tape in Abhay and Vasundhara's car. This leads to the couple being chased by the CM's goons and Inspector Nagesh Rao (Kay Kay Menon), who wants to get hold of the tape in order to exhort money from the CM.

== Cast ==
- Gautam Gupta as Abhay Narula
- Priyanka Kothari as Vasundhara 'Vasu' Dave
- Kay Kay Menon as Nagesh Rao
- Rajpal Yadav as Kay Jagtap Tiwari
- Priyanka Sharma as Sanjana Joshi
- Ravi Kale as Chief Minister Arjun Patil
- Shereveer Vakil as T. S. 'Ranga' Ranganathan
- Govind Namdeo as Deputy Chief Minister Praveen Deshpande
- Ravi Bhatia as Veer baji singh
- Aamir Iqbal Sial as Aamri Sir
- Shazad Latif as Man

== Soundtrack ==
- Go – Kunal Ganjawala, Meenal Jain, Suzanne D'Mello and Shaan
- So Cool – Kunal Ganjawala and Suzanne D'Mello
- Oooh – Vinod Rathod and Sunidhi Chauhan
- Kaash – Farhad Bhiwandiwala and Priyadarshini
- Kaash (Remix) – Farhad Bhiwandiwala and Priyadarshini
- Dhan Tan Tan (Remix) – Kunal Ganjawala and Sneha Khanwalkar
- Dhan Tan Tan – Kunal Ganjawala and Sneha Khanwalkar
- Oooh (Remix) – Vinod Rathod and Sunidhi Chauhan

== Reception ==
A critic from The Times of India wrote that "Goes without saying, Do not 'GO'!"
