= Sreejita De =

Indian actress

Sreejita De Blohm-Pape
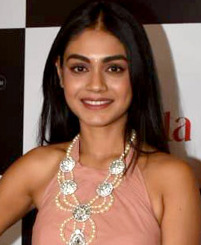
- De in 2023
- Born: 16 July; Haldia, West Bengal
- Occupations: Actress; model
- Years active: 2007–present
- Known for: Uttaran; Tum Hi Ho Bandhu Sakha Tumhi; Nazar; Bigg Boss 16
- Spouse: Michael Blohm-Pape (m. 2023)

Sreejita De Blohm-Pape (born 16 July) is an Indian actress who primarily works in Hindi television. De is best known for her portrayal of Mukta Rathore Kashyap in Uttaran, which ranks among India's longest-running television series. Following this, she portrayed Shreya Pethewala in Tum Hi Ho Bandhu Sakha Tumhi and Dilruba in Nazar. In 2022, participated in Bigg Boss 16.

== Personal life ==
Sreejita got engaged to her long-term boyfriend Michael Blohm-Pape on 21 December 2021 and the couple got married on 1 July 2023 at a Church in Germany.

== Career ==
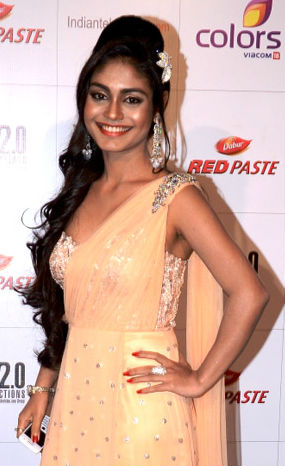
De in 2012 at the Indian Telly Awards

She made her debut on TV with Kasautii Zindagii Kay, playing the role of Gargi Tushar Bajaj. At the same time Ekta Kapoor offered her the role of Aastha in Karam Apna Apna. In 2008, she appeared in the Bollywood film Tashan as Paravati. In the same year, she played the lead role in the soap opera Annu Ki Ho Gayee Waah Bhai Waah as Annu. In 2012 she bagged the lead character of Mukta Raghuvendra Pratap Rathore, Tapasya's daughter, in Uttaran on Colors TV.

She played the lead role of Shreya Bhushan Pethewala in Tum Hi Ho Bandhu Sakha Tumhi, which is aired on Zee TV. In 2016 she joined the cast of Piya Rangrezz as Aradhya Shamsher Singh, which aired on Life Ok. She was seen in the Star Plus show Koi Laut Ke Aaya Hai as Kavya. She was also seen in “Luv Ka The End” as Sonia.

Apart from that, she has done episodic roles in shows like Savdhaan India, Aahat, Ssshhhh...Koi Hai, Aye Zindagi, Mahima Shani Dev Ki and Chakradhari Ajay Krishna.

From 2018 to 2020, she was seen in Nazar as Dilruba. In 2019, she join Yehh Jadu Hai Jinn Ka! Where she portrayed the role of Aliya.

From 2022 to 2023, she participated in Colors TV's popular reality show Bigg Boss 16. She was evicted on Day 13 but later returned as a wild-card on Day 69. On Day 105, she was evicted, finishing at 12th place.

In 2024, she played the role of Chhaya in Shaitani Rasmein.

From January 2025 to June 2025, she played Rajnandini Thakur in Colors TV's the second season of Doree.

== Filmography ==
=== Films ===
Year	Title	Role	Notes	Ref.
2008	Tashan	Parvati		
2011	Luv Ka The End	Sonia Lovani		
2013	Monsoon Shootout	Geeta		
2019	Rescue	Honey		

=== Television ===
Year	Title	Role	Notes	Ref.
2007–2008	Kasautii Zindagii Kay	Gargi Bajaj		
2008	Annu Ki Ho Gayee Waah Bhai Waah	Annu Bedi		
2009	Ladies Special	Shivangi		
2009	CID	Reena	Crossover episode	
2009	Aahat	Reena	Crossover episode	
2010	Miley Jab Hum Tum	Ashwini "Ash"		
2012–2015	Uttaran	Mukta Rathore Kashyap		
2015	Tum Hi Ho Bandhu Sakha Tumhi	Shreya Bhushan Pethewala		
2015–2016	Piya Rangrezz	Dr. Aaradhya Singh		
2017	Koi Laut Ke Aaya Hai	Kavya Singh Rathore Shekhari		
2017	Aye Zindagi	Sabia		
2018–2020	Nazar	Dilruba		
2019	Nazar	Sanam Kabra		
2019	Laal Ishq	Sakeena Khan	Episode: "Khooni Kathal"	
2019	Laal Ishq	Shivani	Episode: "Singhali"	
2020	Yehh Jadu Hai Jinn Ka!	Aliya Khan		
2022–2023	Bigg Boss 16	Contestant	12th place	
2023	Entertainment Ki Raat Housefull	Herself	Guest appearance	
2024	Shaitani Rasmein	Chhaya / Maya		
2025	Doree	Rajnandini Thakur		

=== Web series ===
Year	Title	Role	Notes	Ref.
2018	Untouchable	Dr. Natasha Narang		
2020	Naxalbari	Prakruti		
2020	RVM Films	Nandini		

== See also ==
- List of Indian television actresses
