= Dekha Ek Khwaab =

- Genre: Drama
- Written by: Ritu Bhatia; Ishita Moitra; Munisha Rajpal
- Directed by: Saagar Kagra; Deepak Thakur
- Creative director: Persis Siganporia
- Starring: See below
- Country of origin: India
- Original language: Hindi
- No. of seasons: 1
- No. of episodes: 173

Production
- Producers: Shrishti Arya; Goldie Behl
- Camera setup: Multi-camera
- Running time: Approx. 20-25 minutes
- Production company: Rose Audio Visuals

Original release
- Network: Sony Entertainment Television
- Release: 21 November 2011 – 2 August 2012

Dekha Ek Khwaab (transl. Saw A Dream) is an Indian soap opera that aired on Sony Entertainment Television India. The series premiered on 21 November 2011 and went off air on 2 August 2012.

It is the story of Monia a young girl who makes a wish to become a princess and how she deals with the realisation that she actually is one. Her wish comes true overnight as she discovers that she is the long lost princess of the Devgarh Royals.

The show is so popular that fans still demands Season 2 even after years it went off air.

== Plot ==
The series revolves around a 19 year-old girl named Monia, who discovers that she is Rajkumari Manyata, the crown princess of Devgarh. Manyata was kidnapped at the age of 3, and had been living with Murari Lal, a poor watchman who kidnapped her in order to take revenge from her father, Maharaj Brijraj, when the latter killed Murari's wife and children in an accident.

After sixteen years, Murari takes Manyata to Mumbai and she found returned to her family. Meanwhile, Manyata falls in love with Akash, a commoner. Yuvraj Udayveer Singh of Jaigarh (Uday), to whom Manyata was engaged as a child, befriends her but is upset to find out about Akash as he too has fallen in love with Manyata. Manyata's younger sister, Jainandini, has been in love with Uday since childhood and resents Manyata. A frustrated Uday calls Akash to meet him where they end up fighting and Akash falls over a cliff. Jainandini records the incident on her cell phone and starts blackmailing Uday.

Thinking Akash has gone missing, Manyata decides to become the perfect princess. The royal priest arranges three exams to see who between Manyata and Jainandini should be the heir. Jainandini creates many obstacles for Manyata and orchestrates multiple attempts to kill her but Manyata survives and is declared the 21st heiress or Yuvrani of Devgarh.

After her coronation, Uday proposes to Manyata. Manyata finds out about Akash's fall and gets Uday arrested. Uday gets out on bail and informs Manyata about a contract between Rajmata and Uday's father, Maharaj Girijaraj, which states that the heiress of Devgarh must marry the heir of Jaigarh otherwise Devgarh would belong to Uday's family. A revengeful Jainandini causes Rajmata to meet with an accident landing her in a coma.

Jainandini's ex-fiance, Jagat Singh Rathore returns and introduces her to his friend Aryan who turns out to be Akash. Akash now wants to destroy both royal families which leaves Manyata shocked. Given the challenges posed by Uday and his father, Manyata gives in and decides to marry Uday. She also realises her love for him and decides to meet Akash one last time. However, she is delayed and Jainandini tries to replace her during the wedding ceremony. Uday finds out and is angered by Manyata's betrayal. He calls off the wedding.

Uday hosts a party and Manyata gets upset seeing him dance with Jainandini. She finally professes her love to him and he reciprocates her feelings. However, Akash and Jainandini team up to create misunderstandings between them. Uday meets with an accident and Manyata prays for his recovery. Manyata is reassured of Uday's love when his lawyer tells her that Uday had already signed over Devgarh back to her. Uday learns of Manyata's prayers and devotion for him and they finally reunite.

== Cast and characters ==
Actor	Character	Details
Priyal Gor	Yuvrani Manyata Kumari / Monia	Heiress of the Devgarh Royal Family and the elder daughter of Maharani Komal and Maharaj Brijraj; granddaughter of Rajmata Mrinalini Devi
Shritama Mukherjee	Rajkumari Jainandini “Jai” Kumari	Manyata's younger sister and younger daughter of Maharani Komal and Maharaj Brijraj; granddaughter of Rajmata Mrinalini Devi
Aruna Irani	Rajmata Mrinalini Devi	Queen of Devgarh, Brijraj‘s mother; Komal’s mother in law; Manyata and Jainandani’s grandmother
Shahbaz Khan	Maharaj Brijraj Singh	Manyata and Jainandini's father
Anita Kulkarni	Maharani Komal Devi	Manyata and Jainandini's mother
Ashish Kapoor	Yuvraj Udayveer Singh	Heir of the Jaigarh royal family and son of Maharaj Grijraj
Ankita Bhargava	Rajkumari Unnati	Uday's sister and the Princess of Jaigarh; Manyata's friend
Amit Behl	Maharaj Giriraj Singh	King of Jaigarh; Uday and Unnati's father
Sujata Sehgal	Mainka Singh	Maharaj Brijraj's sister; Manyata and Jainandini's aunt
Kuldeep Mallik	Pratap Singh	Mainka's husband
Mark Farokh Parakh	Rajkumar Vijayendra “Vijay” Singh	Mainka's son; Manyata and Jainandini's cousin
		Rajkumari Unnati's lover and fiancé
Rajesh Jais	Murari Lal	Manyata's adoptive father who kidnapped her when she was a child
Aliraza Namdar	Doctor Saheb	Family doctor of the Devgarh Royal Family
Abhishek Rawat	Aakash Verma / Aryan Rai Chawdhury	Manyata's first love
Bharat Kaul	Mr. Raichowdhury	Aryan's foster father
Kunal Bakshi	Jagat Singh Rathore	Jainandini's ex-fiancé and Aryan's friend
Falaq Naaz	Tara	Aryan's / Akash's girlfriend and fiancée
