= Galli Galli Sim Sim =

- Genre: Educational; Sketch comedy Puppet show Animation
- Written by: Karan Agarwal
- Theme music composer: Julius Packiam
- Opening theme: 'Kuch to Mast Baat Hai'
- Country of origin: India
- Original language: Hindi
- No. of seasons: 10

Production
- Production companies: Sesame Workshop India; Miditech; Turner Entertainment India

Original release
- Network: Cartoon Network (India); Pogo TV; DD National
- Release: 15 August 2006

Galli Galli Sim Sim is the Hindi language adaptation of the American children's television series Sesame Street (famous for its Muppets), for India. The show debuted in 2006.

For its first five seasons it was co-produced by Sesame Workshop and Turner Entertainment, through Miditech. The show's Indian production company is known as Sesame Workshop India.

== Production ==
Production of the show is based in Delhi. Filming of the first season's 65 half-hour episodes began in February 2006, with the premiere held on 15 August 2006. Until now the show has produced 10 seasons.

Funding for the initial development phase of Sesame Workshop India was provided through the support of the United States Agency for International Development (USAID), ICICI Bank and Turner Broadcasting.

Although India has more than 15 official languages, not including English, producers decided to launch the show in Hindi, with a few English words in each episode.

== Format ==
Episodes are similar in format to that of the original series, consisting of several segments. Some segments are filmed locally with Indian actors, some are animated and some are the original Sesame Street skits dubbed into Hindi.

== Characters ==
- Jugaadu, who does not view his disability as a handicap.
- Basha Bhaijaan, who owns a corner store and knows several Indian languages.
- Sid, who likes to dance and is friends with Googly.
- Dawa Di, Basha's wife, who is from North East India, and teaches dance.
- Kabir, Basha Bhaijaan and Dawa Di's son, who is an active and curious eight-year-old.
- Col. Albert Pinto, a retired army person, is an advocate for healthy living and civic sense.
- Rukmini Pinto (Doctor Aunty), Col. Pinto's wife. A doctor by profession, she is a combination of contemporary and traditional wisdom.

Muppet characters include:

- Chamki, a tomboyish five-year-old girl, dressed most often in a school uniform with her hair tied back into two pigtails with blue bows. Chamki is warm, friendly, sensitive and has a knack for problem solving. She also knows karate and plays the electric guitar. In the Galli, Chamki is very popular and a mascot for girl-child education and school readiness in India. She is the main protagonist of the series and is played by Ghazal Javed.
- Boombah, an eight foot tall pink lion who loves to dance, exercise and eat healthy foods. From the royal family of Boombahgarh, Boombah is the star drummer in the Galli and is often seen with headphones shaking a leg under a tree. Played by Manish Sachdeva
- Googly, Googly is a six-year-old furry blue monster with a penchant for asking tricky questions. He also plays cricket. Played by Gaurav Srivastava
- Aanchoo is a purple monster who tells stories from all over the world. She can vanish and appear at will and is often insightful and solution-oriented, helping the rest of the Galli cast on their many escapades. Season 6 introduce's Aanchoo's Auto Library, a bookmobile. Aanchoo has a book with a solution to every problem. Played by Sangya Ojha
- Grover is a tall, gangly, dark-blue monster who speaks in a variety of Indian accents. Grover owns a dhaba which is the best and the most hygienic dhaba in the Galli. Grover is associated with disruptive fun and learning. Grover's over enthusiasm to help others gets in the way at times. Grover gives information on various subjects but then again has an unexpected take on it.
- Hero was introduced in season 6. He is an orange coloured Muppet who loves to dress up. He is fascinated by Bollywood and takes himself to be a star. Hero recites dialogues from popular Bollywood movies and boasts about the celebrities he claims to know. He often visits Grover's dhaba, but is quickly frustrated by Grover's well-meaning but bumbling antics. Played by Hashim Haider.
- Khadoosa is the grouchy neighbour in the Galli but is never intentionally mean. Though he keeps to himself, he often gets dragged into the Galli goings-on, much to his exasperation. Despite being quite different from the rest of the Galli residents who are cheerful, Khadoosa is very much at home. He often boasts about his garden and is proud to have the best plants under his care.
- Elmo, a three-and-a-half-year-old red and furry monster who loves words on the Galli Galli Sim Sim word of the day segment. Elmo is cheerful, enthusiastic and loves building his vocabulary.
- Bert and Ernie are two friends. Bert is more mature and analytical and he considers himself the voice of reason in their relationship. Though Bert is wise, he can be rather eccentric. He collects bottle caps and paper clips, plays the tuba and loves Bernice, his pet pigeon. Bert is not always a willing participant in Ernie's escapades. However, Bert always forgives Ernie. Ernie, the outgoing foil to the more serious and responsible Bert, is great at explaining things, but can sometimes be a bit too smart for his own good. Ernie talks himself into some tight corners and often falls prey to his own jokes, yet his free-spirited approach to his successes and failures makes him one of Sesame Street's most enduring and likeable characters. In season 6, Claymation is used in a new segment called Bert & Ernie's Great Adventures, during which the two go on adventures to exotic places like the Cherrapunji, Antarctica, the Himalayas, Australia, and Goa.
- Raya is a girl who teaches viewers about proper hygiene.

== Chamki Ki Duniya ==
An animated series Chamki Ki Duniya based on the character "Chamki" aired on Pogo from 2014 to 2016.

== Legacy ==
The program, in addition to literacy and math, includes segments promoting financial empowerment and gender equity.

One 2019 study found that preschoolers who watched the program had better literacy and math skills and had better understandings of health and emotional issues.

The series is watched by about ten million children each year.
