= Saeeda Imtiaz =

Pakistani actress

- Occupation: Actress
- Years active: 2010–present

Saeeda Imtiaz (Urdu: سعیدہ امتیاز) is a model and actress.

== Personal life ==
She was born in the United Arab Emirates and raised in Long Island, New York; she comes from a Kashmiri-American family. She attended Stony Brook University with a degree in Psychology.

On 18 April 2023, news websites reported about her death based on an announcement made on her verified Instagram account. "With a heavy heart, we are saddened to inform you that Saida Imtiaz passed away this morning as she was found dead in her room. Rest in peace," stated the Instagram post. However, it later emerged that she was alive and well.

== Career ==
Imtiaz worked as a model, both in shows and in photo shoots, starting in 2013 and finishing in 2018.

In 2012, Imtiaz filmed a bilingual Pakistani film, Kaptaan: The Making of a Legend which was shot in Pakistan. Imtiaz portrays Jemima Khan, the ex-wife of Imran Khan.

Imtiaz was featured in Wajood, a Pakistani film directed and produced by Javed Sheikh released in June 2018.

== Filmography ==
Year	Title	Role	Notes
2018	Redrum – A tale of Murder	Aarika	Short Film
TBA	Kaptaan: The Making of a Legend	Jemima Khan	Film
2018	Wujood	Arzoo	Film
2019	Thori setting Thora Pyar	Amal	Film
2022	Tamasha	Contestant	Reality show

2025 Qulfee Komal Film
