= Wajood (2018 film) =

- Theatrical release poster
- Urdu: وجود
- Directed by: Jawed Sheikh
- Written by: Baber Kashmiri; Javed Sheikh
- Screenplay by: Baber Kashmiri; Javed Sheikh
- Produced by: Momal Sheikh; Shehzad Sheikh
- Starring: Aditi Singh; Danish Taimoor; Saeeda Imtiaz
- Cinematography: Kelvin Keehde; Asif Khan
- Edited by: Asad Zaidi
- Music by: Sahir Ali Bagga
- Production company: Jawed Sheikh Films
- Distributed by: SagaHits; Geo Films; Walt Disney Studios
- Release date: 16 June 2018 (Eid al-Fitr)
- Country: Pakistan
- Language: Urdu
- Box office: est. Rs. 8 crore

Wajood (lit: Existence) is a 2018 Pakistani revenge thriller film co-written and directed by Jawed Sheikh. It stars Danish Taimoor and Saeeda Imtiaz in leading roles, while also featuring Aditi Singh, Nadeem Baig, Shahid, Ali Saleem and Jawed Sheikh himself. It was produced by Momal Sheikh and Shehzad Sheikh under the banner Jawed Sheikh Films. The film released on Eid ul-Fitr, 16 June 2018, and has been distributed by SagaHits with its music available on Unisys Music.

== Cast ==
- Saeeda Imtiaz
- Danish Taimoor
- Javed Sheikh
- Aditi Singh as Jessica
- Shahid
- Nadeem Baig
- Shaheen Khan as Mrs. Samdani
- Asad Mehmood
- Faiza Khan
- Frieha Altaf as Mrs. Shafqat
- Ali Saleem
- Iqra Memon
- Azhr Ahmd (rabia d)

== Production ==
=== Development ===
In October 2015, Javed Sheikh announced that he was making his directional comeback with Wajood, and describes the film as "vicious adoration story". Revealing about the story Sheikh said, "I'm not saying it has maar dhaar in it, but it's not going to be your usual romantic love story. It's going to be intense and something different." The film will be produced by Sheikh's company JK Productions and line production in Turkey will be carried out by Azat Films Türkiye. In November 2015, IMGC Global Entertainment came on board as a distributor.

=== Casting ===
In July 2016, Saeeda Imtiaz and Danish Taimoor were cast in a leading roles. The character of Saeeda is "of a young Pakistani girl who is very outspoken, independent and doesn't rely on anybody to fulfill her dreams," and further revealed "for now, I have just signed the film with the initial details; I will get to know more about the team and the script once I'm in Pakistan." While Taimoor said, "The script is brilliant and its music also promises to be so; this is the main reason why I signed the film. And also the fact that Javed Sheikh Sahab is making his directional comeback with it. How could I have said no?" In May 2016, Frieha Altaf was cast in an unannounced role.

=== Filming ===
Principal photography took place in December 2016 in Pakistan, Turkey and Thailand. Javed said, "Half of the film shots in Pakistan and half in Turkey."

=== Marketing ===
The film was released in 2018 on Eid Ul Fitr with its trailer launch hosted at the Nueplex Cinema on 12 May 2018.

== Soundtrack ==
The music and soundtrack of the film is composed by Sahir Ali Bagga, while some of the track will have additional musicians, Sheikh said, "The majority of the soundtrack will be composed by [Sahir Ali] Bagga but it is likely that we may also have one or two more musicians contribute their tracks to the film as well. It is a great blend of tunes in my opinion and this was definitely a good decision”"

No.	Title	Lyrics	Singer(s)	Length
1.	"Wajood Hai Tu"	Asim Raza	Sahir Ali Bagga, Nish Asher
2.	"Baby Nachdi"	Asim Raza	Sahir Ali Bagga, Damia Farooq
3.	"Tere Bin"	Asim Raza	Sahir Ali Bagga, Nish Asher
