= Janani (2006 film) =

2006 Indian Hindi language film

- Directed by: Chander H. Bahl
- Produced by: Sushilkumar Agrawal
- Starring: Mohnish Bahl; Bhagyashree; Ayesha Jhulka; Aman Verma; Vineet Raina; Sonica Handa; Anjana Mumtaz
- Release date: 17 November 2006
- Running time: 124 minutes
- Country: India
- Language: Hindi

Janani is a 2006 Indian Hindi language film starring Bhagyashree and Ayesha Jhulka.

== Plot ==
Rahul and Neha, college students, fall deeply in love. When they decide to marry, Rahul's parents strongly oppose the relationship without explaining why. Believing that the objection stems from Neha's lower social and financial background, Rahul confronts them. His mother then reveals a shocking truth: Neha's mother, Akansha, once played a major role in helping their family establish its toy business—and that Rahul is actually Akansha's biological son.

Devastated, Rahul believes that he and Neha are siblings and is horrified by the revelation. The story then unfolds in flashbacks explaining the complex events surrounding his birth. Akansha and her husband had a son, also named Rahul, who died of a brain tumor. During his illness, their close friends Urmila and her husband supported them financially and emotionally. Around the same time, Urmila, who was unable to carry a child to term, asked Akansha to be a surrogate for her baby. Akansha agreed, but after her own child's death, she grew emotionally attached to the baby she carried and refused to give him up, naming him Rahul after her deceased son.

Urmila's husband pleaded for the child's custody, and when Akansha saw the emotional toll her refusal was taking on Urmila's health, she finally agreed to hand the baby over to them. Thus, Rahul was raised by Urmila and her husband, unaware of his true origins.

Later, Neha learns from Rahul's biological mother that she too had been adopted by Urmila, meaning she and Rahul are not related by blood. However, before she can tell him, Rahul, tormented by the belief that they are siblings, shoots himself. Neha reaches him in time, explains the truth, and Rahul survives. The film concludes a year later with Rahul and Neha happily married, now parents to a son of their own, as the family celebrates their reunion in a joyful finale.

== Cast ==
- Bhagyashree as Akanksha Tarun Awasthi, Child Rahul and Rahul's biological mother
- Ayesha Jhulka as Urmila
- Mohnish Bahl as Raj
- Aman Verma as Tarun Awasthi, Child Rahul and Rahul's biological father
- Vineet Raina as Rahul Awasthi
- Sonica Handa as Neha Rahul Awasthi
- Anjana Mumtaz as Mrs. Awasthi, Rahul's grandmother
- Hemant Choudhary
- Smith Seth as Child Rahul Awasthi

== Reception ==
Taran Adarsh of Bollywood Hungama gave the film 1 star out of 5, writing ″Chander Behl's direction has its limitations due to a half-convincing script. Dialogues too seem straight out of yesteryear films. Musically [Nirmal Pawar], a mediocre score. JANANI has two powerful performances in the form of Bhagyashree and Mohnish Bahl. Both seasoned actors, they infuse life in their roles with solid portrayals. Ayesha Julka goes overboard at times. Aman Verma is passable. Vineet and Sonica are able in their debut film. On the whole, JANANI has nothing to lure the family audiences, its target audience. At the box-office, this one's a non-starter!″
