= Aditi Singh (actress) =

Indian film actress

- Born: Delhi, India
- Occupations: Actress, model
- Years active: 2016–present
- Parent(s): Jainendra Pratap Singh; Shraddhha Singh
- Relatives: Aditya Pancholi (uncle)

Aditi Singh is an Indian actress. She made her Telugu film debut in Guppedantha Prema in 2016.

== Personal life ==
Born in Delhi to Shraddhha Singh and Jainendra Pratap Singh (former Bollywood actor, in Dayavan, Kohraam, Deewana Mujh Sa Nahin and many other films), Singh was brought up in Mumbai where she did her schooling from Jamnabai Narsee School, Juhu and further completed her studies from Mithibai College of Arts. The niece of actor Aditya Pancholi through her mother, her family roots are from Rajasthan.

Her exposure to films from a very young age kindled her interest in acting, which inclined her to participate in several school plays and skits. Also having singing as a hobby, Singh became the lead singer in the school band in 9th grade, winning several interschool competitions. She was trained in classical kathak dance in India by the late Sitara Devi's daughter Jayanti Mala.

== Career ==
Singh started her career at a young age, featuring in a Clean & Clear viral advertisement at age 15. She then played the female lead in the Telugu romance movie Guppedantha Prema. She turned 17 while filming this movie. She received good feedback for her debut film. She appeared in another Telugu film, Nenu Kidnap Iyanu, starring Posani Krishna Murali in the lead. She appeared in Pakistani film Wujood. In 2019 she was given the lead role in another Pakistani film project Chaa Jaa Re.

== Filmography ==
Year	Film	Role	Language	Notes
2016	Guppedantha Prema	Sandy	Telugu	
2017	Nenu Kidnap Iyanu	Mirinda	Telugu	
2018	Wajood	Jessica	Urdu	Pakistani film
2018	Beti	Reema Shah	Hindi	Short Film
2024	Gautama Buddha Matha	Mahāmāyā	Sinhala	Sri Lankan film
TBA	Chaa Jaa Re †	TBA	Urdu	Pakistani film
