= Yeh Jawani Ta Ra Ri Ri =

- Genre: Teen drama
- Created by: BOLT Media Limited
- Written by: Karan Agarwal
- Country of origin: India
- Original language: Hindi
- No. of seasons: 1
- No. of episodes: 47

Production
- Camera setup: Multi-camera

Original release
- Network: Channel V India
- Release: 16 May – 24 October 2014

Yeh Jawani Ta Ra Ri Ri is an Indian television series that premiered on 16 May 2014 on Channel V India. Ye Jawani Ta Ra Ri Ri is a story of three brothers and their journey of discovering their adulthood. The story telecast the common problems faced by young men(boys) and how they get in a relationship.

== Cast ==
- Mohit Tolani as Siddharth Khosla
- Pooja Bhamrah as Devika
- Chirag Mahbubani as Aditya Khosla
- Shritama Mukherjee as Kimaya
- Anshuman Malhotra as Ishaan Khosla
- Shrishti Ganguly Rindani as Gattu
