= Gautam Gupta =

Indian television actor and model

- Born: 13 April 1978 (age 48)
- Occupations: Actor; Model
- Spouse: Smriti Khanna (m. 2017)
- Children: 2 (Anayka Gupta, Aizah Gupta )

Gautam Gupta is an Indian television actor and model. He was last seen in the Balaji Telefilms show Kuch Toh Hai Tere Mere Darmiyaan, which aired on Star Plus.

== Filmography ==
Film

- 2007 - Go as Abhay Narula

Television

- 2014-2015 - Meri Aashiqui Tumse Hi as Sharman Mitesh Parekh
- 2015-2016 - Kuch Toh Hai Tere Mere Darmiyaan as Madhavan "Maddy" Venkat
- 2016 - "Box Cricket League" as himself

== Personal life ==
Gupta is from a family of people in the film industry, that work in the business world of entertainment. His father Sushil Gupta owns a post-production company. Gautam was always interested in arts, but it was not until a friend recommended him to try an acting class, when he realized that acting was what he wanted to do. He married his Meri Aashiqui co-star Smriti Khanna on 23 November 2017.Their daughter was born on 15 April 2020.
