= Gumrah: End of Innocence =

Indian television series

- Created by: Vikas Gupta
- Written by: Amit Senchoudhary; Juhi Shekhar; Nishchal Shome; Neeraj Udhwani; Vikas Gupta; Dharam Dhiman; Nihar Mehta; Dialogues; Aparna Nadig
- Directed by: Aapar Gupta; Kushal Zaveri; Suyash Vadhavkar; Vikram Rai
- Creative directors: Karan Agarwal; Mitali Mitra
- Presented by: Karan Kundra (2012–2014); Abhay Deol (2014); Karanvir Bohra (2014–2015); Karan Patel (2015–2016)
- Country of origin: India
- Original language: Hindi
- No. of seasons: 5
- No. of episodes: 269

Production
- Executive producers: Suyash Vadhavkar; Vikram Rai; Vatsal; Jigar
- Producers: Ekta Kapoor; Shobha Kapoor
- Production location: Mumbai, Maharashtra
- Editor: Sandeep Bhatt
- Camera setup: Multi-camera
- Running time: 45 minutes
- Production company: Balaji Telefilms

Original release
- Network: Channel V India
- Release: 11 March 2012 – 26 June 2016

Gumrah: End of Innocence (transl. Astray: End of Innocence) is an Indian crime television series that started airing from March 2012 on Channel V India. The show presents crime-related incidents committed by young people. The series was produced by Ekta Kapoor under her banner Balaji Telefilms.

The show went on air on Channel V India on 11 March 2012 airing weekly with rebroadcasts on Channel V India, StarPlus. Episodes in the second season aired daily. Season 3 started airing from 7 July 2013. The opening episode was co-anchored by Chitrangada Singh and Karan Kundra. Season 4 was hosted by Abhay Deol who was replaced by Karanvir Bohra. Season 5 started on 22 March 2015, Last episode was aired on 26 June 2016.

== Plot ==
The show explores and suggests measures to avert crimes, narrating real-life stories revolving around harassment, kidnapping, murders, etc. committed by teenagers.

== Series overview ==
Season	No. of episodes	Originally aired		Hosts	Ref
Season	No. of episodes	Season premiere	Season finale	Hosts	Ref
1	16	11 March 2012	1 July 2012	Karan Kundra	
2	112	9 July 2012	18 November 2012	Karan Kundra	
3	32	7 July 2013	9 February 2014	Karan Kundra	
4	42	31 August 2014	15 March 2015	Abhay Deol (8 Episodes); Karanvir Bohra (Rest of the season)	
5	67	22 March 2015	26 June 2016	Karan Patel	

== Cast ==
- Ashish Dixit as Neeraj
- Karan Kundra as Host
- Abhay Deol as Host
- Karanvir Bohra as Host
- Ritwika Gupta as Payal
- Rachana Parulkar as Kanak Dagar
- Neil Bhatt as Aditya
- Rocky Verma as Father / Village's Subedar (1 Episode - 2013)
- Kurush Deboo as Porous Batliwala (1 Episode - 2012)
- Shabaaz Abdullah Badi as Rishi in Season 5 Episode 25 (2015)
- Teeshay Shah (2 Episodes 2014–2015)
- Sakshma Srivastav as Taani & Megha (2 Episodes, Season 3 Episode 6 & Season 4.
- Karan Patel as Current Host (March 2015 - June 2016)
- Mohak Meet From (2012 to 2015)
- Ayush Mamodia On (6 May 2012)
- Jigyasa Singh
- Namita Dubey as Shreya
- Amitayushya Mishra as Shridhar (Episode 4, Season 3)
- Jaswinder Gardner
- Ashi Singh on (season 5 2015)
- Raj Anadkat as Romi
- Nabeel Mirajkar as Manav, Rishab and Dhruv (3 episodes)
- Ahsaas Channa as Nandini/Yamini
- Mazhar Syed as Prithviraj Avasthi

== Accolades ==
- The show won Best Crime/Thriller Show at 12th Indian Television Academy Awards.
- The show was nominated as Favorite TV Crime Drama People's Choice Awards India.
- The show has secured 10 nominations at the Indian Telly Awards 2013
