= Mayank Gandhi =

Indian politician

Personal details
- Born: 7 November 1958 (age 67) Mumbai
- Spouse: Minal Gandhi
- Children: 2
- Education: B.Sc, Management
- Occupation: Founder & Managing Trustee at Global Vikas Trust

Mayank Gandhi is a social activist from India. He was previously a member of core committee in the India Against Corruption movement and a National Executive Member of the Aam Aadmi Party(AAP). Presently he is the chief trustee and founder of the non-governmental organization Global Vikas Trust, which aims at transforming the drought-hit villages of Marathwada, Maharashtra and Madhya Pradesh, by aiming to increase the minimum income of India's farmers from the average of ₹10,000 to over ₹1 lakh per acre per annum.

== Early life and education ==
Mayank Gandhi was born on 7 November 1958 in a middle-class family in Mumbai. He completed his science graduation (B.Sc) and Diploma in Business Management in 1981. Along with his education, he used to give tuitions in order to support his educational expenditures.

== Professional career ==
Mayank was earlier an urban planner and used to engage with governments on inner city development in various developed and developing countries. He was part of the team that worked for preparing a law and process to remake Mumbai using cluster development model. The Chicago-based Council on Tall Buildings and Urban Habitat, the largest not-for-profit body of planners and architects in the world appointed him as part of their advisory council.

== Anti-Corruption activism ==
He got involved in activism since 2003 and was part of the drafting of the Maharashtra right To Information along with Anna Hazare and was instrumental in other major structural reforms in the country. In 2011, he joined the team that launched the India against Corruption movement and was a core committee member in this movement. When the movement morphed into the (Aam Aadmi Party), he was part of the highest body viz. the National Executive. He was instrumental in the landslide victory of the party in 2013 and 2015 Delhi Assembly election. He also served as the party's head in Maharashtra, before his unit was disbanded because of differences with the party chief, Arvind Kejriwal. Gandhi accused Kejriwal of deviating from the path of honest politics, and of "using and throwing" party volunteers. In 2015, he resigned from the party's National Executive, stating that he had been losing interest in politics.

== Global Vikas Trust ==
The 2016 drought of Marathawada and the multiple suicides by farmers led to Mayank starting a rural transformation mission called Global Parli, under the ambit of the Global Vikas Trust. He selected a cluster of 15 villages in drought-prone Parli tehsil in Beed district of Maharashtra and started working on 360°developments including water management, economic growth, education, health, social reform, community building etc. The goal of this mission is to create multiple models of rural transformation that could be replicated across the country for a better India.

The former years have achieved unprecedented success in transforming the mindset of the people and changing the quality of their lives. Some of the works undertaken include ‘Rejuvenation of Paapnashi River & its Tributaries’, improving infrastructure and providing e-learning platforms, computers, sports equipments in the schools, organising regular health camps for villagers, a campaign to abolish liquor, and encouraging farmers to adopt to new methods of farming. The project is poised to increase the income of the farmers by a factor of ten.

Global Vikas Trust was awarded the "Best Social Enterprise" at the India Leadership Conclave 2016 for providing water during the drought. The Organisation was also awarded with "Innovations in Water Rejuvenation" and with the title "Best NGO" in 2017 at the Pharma Leadership Awards.

In 2018, GVT created 222 crore liters of water storage- by widening the Papnashi river by 70 km, adding 164 farm ponds, 62 check dams, and 5kt weirs. This was achieved by a mix of machinery and voluntary work by the villagers in Parli. As of January 2026, over 800+ crore litres of water have been harvested.

Post 2019, they have started working in 24 districts across 3 states: Maharashtra, Madhya Pradesh, and Gujrat.

In 2019, the Global Vikas Trust started an initiative to switch farmers from non-remunerative crops like soya, cotton, etc to remunerative fruits, like custard apples, mangoes, lemons, apples, and many others, with the aim to raise the minimum income of each farmer in India to ₹1 lakh per acre. They did this by providing farmers with quality saplings at subsidized rates, and training from plantation till harvest. As of January 2026, Global Vikas Trust has provided farmers with over 6.72+ crore fruit tree saplings.

In October 2024, Global Vikas Trust opened GVT Krishikul, a farmer training centre and demonstration space to teach farmers modern farming techniques across many different crops. It is sprawled across 24.5 acres in the Parli Vaijnath of the Beed district, Marathwada in Maharashtra state. GVT Krishikul seeks to address pressing issues such as poverty, climate crisis, chemical-based agriculture, and cow protection. The centre is a significant part of GVT's efforts to support farmers and promote sustainable agriculture.

== AAP & Down ==
In Feb 2018, Gandhi and Shrey Shah authored the book "AAP and Down", which is an in-depth account of the emergence and sudden unspooling of one of India's political party- the Aam Aadmi Party
