= Kanishka Soni =

Indian actress and model from Mumbai

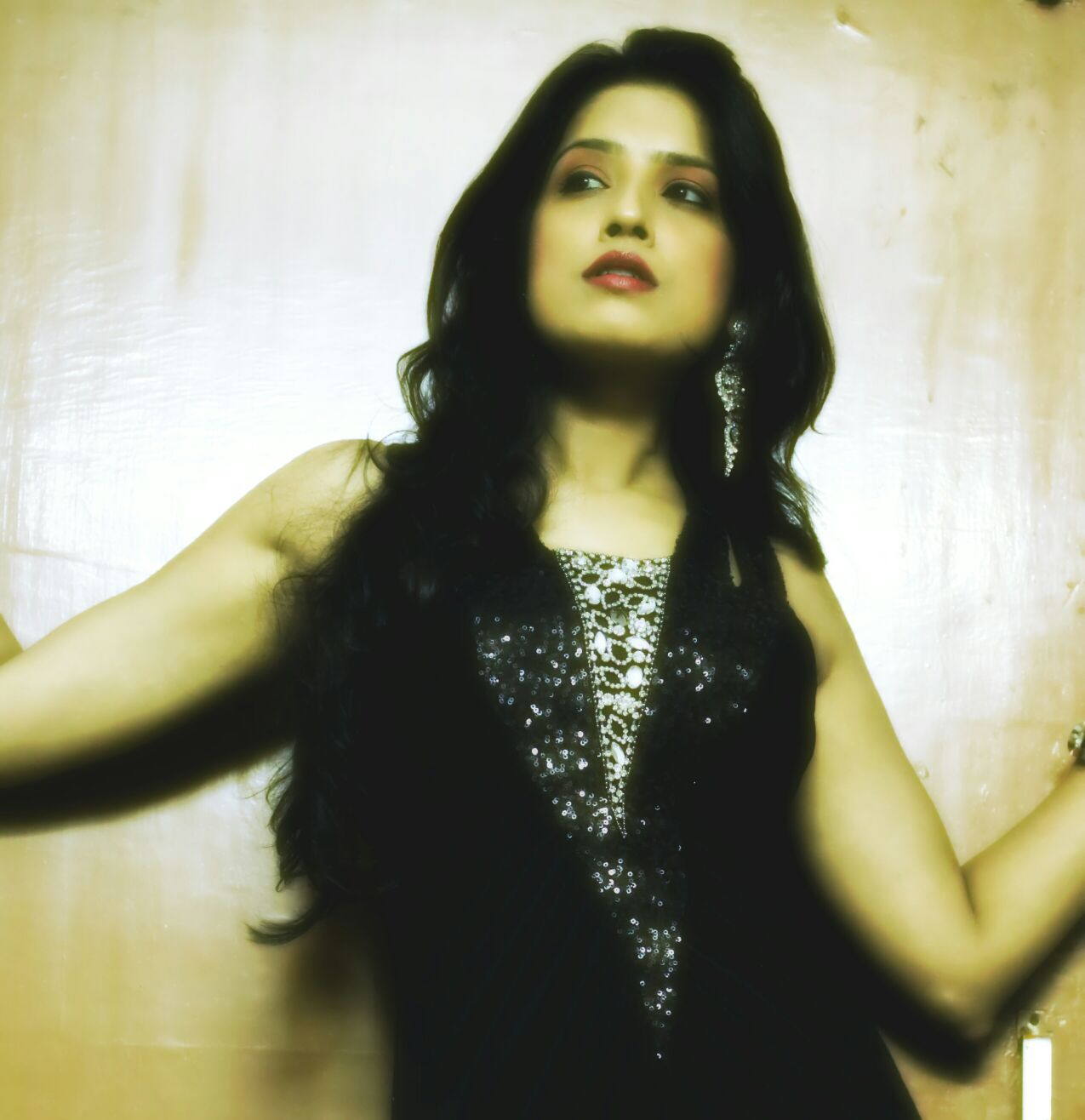
- Born: Kanishka Soni; Ahmedabad, Gujarat, India
- Occupations: Actress, singer, model
- Years active: 2007–present
- Website: www.kanishkasoni.com

Kanishka Soni is an Indian actress and model from Mumbai. She has an MBA in finance from the University of Mumbai. After her studies she was selected for singing in the reality show bathroom singer on Filmy Tv by Optimystix Entertainment. She is best known for her character Daisa's bahu in the Star Plus Tv show Diya Aur Baati Hum, Manjari Satya Nayak in the Life Ok Television series Do Dil Ek Jaan opposite Akshay Dogra, Sati's sister Revati in Devon Ke Dev...Mahadev on Life Ok, Parashavi (Vidur's Wife) in the Star Plus TV soap opera Mahabharat, Maya Thakur in Begusarai (TV series) on &TV, Sumitra in Sankatmochan Mahabali Hanumaan on Sony Entertainment Television, Inspector Redkar in the most popular show on star plus Kullfi Kumarr Bajewala. Currently she is seen as Devi River Ganga in Devi Adi Parashakti on Dangal TV. She is a Politician with Ramdas Athawale's political party.

== Early life ==
Soni was born in Ahmedabad in the Indian state of Gujarat. She completed her schooling from Kendriya Vidyalaya, Shahibaug and Masters and Post Graduation in diploma in finance from University of Mumbai.

== Career ==
Soni started her career in 2007 when she got selected for a singing reality show Bathroom singer on Filmy Tv by Optimystix Entertainment Pvt. Ltd. after completing her studies. Although her career started as a singer, she was more passionate towards acting. Initially she got an opportunity as a model to accompany Akshay Kumar in Grand Finale of Fear Factor Khatron Ke Khiladi Level 2 and with VJ Juhi in Exhausted on Channel V both by Endemol India Pvt. Ltd.. She made her debut in a Tamil movie Pathayeram Kodi opposite to Vivek in 2013. She has appeared in multiple movies, such as Pathaayiram Kodi, Devaraya and Yuvrajayam. She has played various roles in TV shows as Manjari Satya Nayak in the television series Do Dil Ek Jaan on Life OK Tv channel opposite Akshay Dogra and Pavitra Rishta on Zee Tv as Sukruti.

She was paired opposite to Hasan Zaidi in Channel V show Gumrah: End of Innocence, season 3. Currently she is doing Diya Aur Baati Hum on Star Plus as Daisa's Bahu and Devon Ke Dev...Mahadev on Life Ok Tv channel as Princess Raveti. She has been acted in commercial advertisement of Huggies diaper, Shriram cement, Slicer and Dicer Tele, and corporate advertising and promos for N.D.T.V. Imagine shows, promo for Channel V show Yeh Jawani Ta Ra Ri Ri and been model for brands like LIC, Provo Glasses and JULIET Punjabi dresses. She has played various roles in Tv shows as such CID, Crime Patrol and Shapath. Soni played the role of Saraswati Devi and Mata Parvati in an air show Sankatmorchan Hanumaan on DD National. She has appeared in various live show events with singers Anup Jalota and Ram shankar. She has also sung songs for DD National Show Sankatmorchan Hanumaan and for music composer Nikhil Kamath.

Soni has signed to act in the show MTV Webbed-Cyber Abuse (Season 2) hosted by Kritika Kamra on MTV along with Do Dil Ek Jaan co-actor Nikita Sharma by Balaji Telefilms and is said to act in Gumrah: End of Innocence, season 4 and &TV's Tujhse Naraz Nahi Zindagi.

Soni has got her first break as a playback singer for upcoming movie M A PASS which is by the same makers of 2014 released B.A. Pass starer Shilpa Shukla which claimed many national and international awards, The song is composed by Geet Vani, recreated by Dhiren Raichura and mixing by Sajan patel who are very known and experienced people from the industry. while experiencing herself phase of struggle into music industry, she has registered her own company KASO MUZIK which can make easy access for singers from outside world to enter into Bollywood industry

== Recognition ==
- 2007: As a singer, She won a contest on DD National show Close Up Music Masti Aur Dhoom, and a game/quiz show by Indian Television Academy, hosted by Anu Kapoor in 2007.
- 2015 : Gorwanta Gujarati award, for contribution in the Indian Entertainment industry.
- 2015 : Due to her acting, modelling and singing achievements she has been declared by The Times of India multi talented beauty.
- 2016 : Soni was recognised for her social activities for supporting "save girl child" and associating herself with RESCUE FOUNDATION owned by Triveni Acharya

== Television and filmography ==
Year	Show	Role	Notes
2007	Bathroom Singer	Contestant	Reality Television,
2009	Fear Factor: Khatron Ke Khiladi 2	Guest Contestant	Reality Television, in asso. with Endemol India Pvt. Ltd.
2009	Exhausted with VJ Juhi	Guest	Reality Television
2009	Rakhi Ka Swayamwar	Guest	Reality Television
2010	Jamunia	Guest	
2011–2012	Diya Aur Baati Hum	Kajal	
2012	Devaraya	Dance number with Srikant	Telagu Movie
2012	Pavitra Rishta	Sukruti	
2012	Devon Ke Dev...Mahadev	Princess Revati	Mythological Drama
2012	Sankatmorchan Hanumaan	Saraswati Devi and Maa Parvati	Mythological Drama
2012	Baal Veer	Kanishka	Comedy drama
2013	Pathayeram Kodi	Karishma	Tamil Movie, with Vivek and Dhruv bhandari
2013	Niharika	Gracy	
2013	Matha Bhare Manjula	Priya	
2013	Gumrah: End of Innocence Season 3 and 4	Self	Episodic appearance
2014	Yuvrajayam	Tamil superstar Shreya	Tamil Movie, with Venkat
2014	Do Dil Ek Jaan	Manjari Satya Nayak	
2014	Tum Aise Hi Rehna	Self	Drama
2014	Firangi Bahu	Juhi	
2014	MTV Webbed	Priya	Episodic appearance
2015	CID (Indian TV series)	Doctor Prishita	
2015	Crime Patrol (TV series)	Chitra Nigam	Reality Documentary
2015	Mahabharat (2013 TV series)	Parashvi; Vidur's Wife	Mythological Drama
2015	Bharat Ka Veer Putra – Maharana Pratap	Dance Number	Mythological Drama, Sony Entertainment Television (India)
2015	SuperCops vs Supervillains	Sheila	Action Drama
2015	Paisa Ho Paisa	Karishma	Bollywood Movie, with Dhruv Bhandari and Vivek
2015	Savdhaan India	Maya	(Ep. 1346)
2016	Sankatmochan Mahabali Hanuman	Sumitra	Mythological Drama
2016	Begusarai (TV series)	Maya Thakur	Mythological Drama
2016	Savdhaan India	Sweety	(Ep. 1843)
2016	Yeh Jawani Ta Ra Ri Ri	Self	
2018	Kullfi Kumarr Bajewala	Inspector Redkar	
2020	Resurrection jaago aur jiyo	Vedika	
2020	Devi Adi Parashakti	Devi Ganga	
