= SuperCops Vs Super Villains =

Indian television series

- Also known as: Shapath; Hum Ne Li Hai... Shapath; Shapath – Super Cops Vs Super Villains; Super Cops Vs Super Villains – Shapath; Khoonkhar – Super Cops Vs Super Villains; Task Force: Khatarnak Khalnayak
- Genre: Crime; Action; Drama; Horror; Supernatural; Science fiction
- Created by: B. P. Singh
- Written by: Gopal Kulkarni; Shivam Awasthi; Anshuman Sinha; Aniruddh Sengupta; Sunil Drego; Nishikant Roy; Soham Abhiram; Dr Nameeta sharma Koel Chaudhuri; Saanvi Talwar
- Directed by: B. P. Singh
- Creative director: Chirag Shah
- Starring: See below
- Country of origin: India
- Original language: Hindi
- No. of episodes: 599

Production
- Producer: B. P. Singh
- Camera setup: Multi-camera
- Running time: 14–91 mins
- Production company: Fireworks Productions

Original release
- Network: Life OK
- Release: 15 January 2012 – 26 February 2017

SuperCops Vs Super Villains (also known as Hum Ne Li Hai... Shapath) is an Indian crime detective supernatural television series which aired from January 15, 2012 to February 26, 2017 on Life OK. The show was produced by Fireworks Production. It is digitally available on Disney+ Hotstar.

== Plot ==
The series begins with Mumbai Crime Branch Senior Inspectors Abhigyaan and Gautam, along with their friend Sikha.

It later shifts to ACP Karanveer, Senior Inspectors Shaurya, Abhigyaan, and Gautam, ACP Pratap Yashwantrao Teje, and other officers of the Mumbai Crime Branch.

The story then follows ACP Diler, Commander Jagatveer Rana, ACP Gajanan Mazgaonkar, and the SuperCops as they face dangerous villains and fictional creatures.

As the series nears its end, the story centers on the love story between SuperCop werewolf Jai and vampire princess Adonia.

== Cast ==
=== Main ===
- Aamir Dalvi as Senior Inspector Kavi (2012–2015)
- Aman Verma as ACP Diler Kumar (2013–2015)
- Amit Pachori as Senior Inspector Ranveer (2013–2016, 2017)
- Ashok Samarth as ACP Gajanan Mazgaonkar (2016)
- Dakssh Ajit Singh as Senior Inspector Samrat (2012–2013)
- Deepak Sandhu as Inspector Karunesh (2014–2015)
- Gurpreet Bedi as SuperCop Hetonita (2016)
  - Bedi also portrayed various characters such as Damyanti and Rani Zafaara
- Harshad Arora as SuperCop Jai (2016–2017)
- Hasan Zaidi as Senior Inspector Gautam (2012)
- Iris Maity as Senior Inspector Lara (2013–2016)
- Kapil Arya as Sub-Inspector Aditya (2012–2014)
- Karishma Modi as Senior Inspector Kashish (2012–2014)
- King Malkhan as Inspector Rajhans (2014–2015)
- Lalit Bisht as Inspector Param (2014)
- Madhura Naik as Shikha Yashvardhan (2012)
- Mala Salariya as Sub-Inspector Abha (2013–2015)
  - Salariya also portrayed Manpreet and Jaadugarni Janvi
- Manit Joura as Senior Inspector Jaywant Rane (2014–2016)
  - Joura also portrayed Rohit, Pranay and Dhvani Chor
- Meer Ali As Sub-Inspector Anurag Mirza (2013–2014)
- Milind Gunaji as ACP Pratap Yashwantrao Teje (2012–2013)
- Narendra Jha as ACP Karanveer (2012)
- Nitin Chauhaan as SuperCop Jogi Sikander (2016)
- Pankaj Singh as Sub-Inspector Mayank Desai (2012–2016)
- Piyush Sahdev as Senior Inspector Abhigyaan (2012–2013)
- Prateek Awasthi as SuperCop Tej (2014–2015)
- Ragini Nandwani as Adonia, the Vampire Princess (2016–2017)
- Sangram Singh as Senior Inspector Sangram (2014)
- Sarwar Ahuja as Senior Inspector Shaurya / RoboCop (2012–2013, 2013–2014)
- Shakti Anand as Commander Jagatveer Rana (2015–2016)
- Simran Sachdeva as Sub-Inspector Damini (2012–2013)
- Vedita Pratap Singh as Balwinder "Babli" Kaur: Supercop's Forensic Expert (2014–2015)
  - Singh also portrayed Mirror Girl
- Zaan Khan as Supercop Ashumu "Ashu" (2016)

=== Recurring ===
- Anjali Rana as Anjali Diler Kumar: ACP Diler's wife
- Dhananjay Mandrekar as Sub-Inspector Chandan (2012)
- Divyaalakshmi as Bulbul: Inspector Kavi's wife
- Harsh Chhaya as ACP Jairaj: Inspector Gautam's father (2012)
- Jineeth Rath as Koko: Inspector Kavi and Bulbul's adoptive son
- Kanishka Garg as Sub-Inspector Pooja (2012)
- Mohan Kapoor as
  - Yashvardhan (2012)
  - Dakran: A Gangster and Jaywant's real father (2014)
- Rohit Purohit as Varun Kashyap: Elastic Man (2013)
- Sachin Verma as ACP Digvijay (2012)
- Sapna Thakur as Sub-Inspector Aastha (2012)
- Vaishnavi Dhanraj as
  - Nayantara / Sakuna
  - SuperCop Shaina
- Varun Buddhadev as Nonu (2016)
- Viren Singh Rathore as Sub Inspector Deepak
- Zohaib Siddiqui as
  - Sub-Inspector Vikas (2012)
  - Namish

=== Guest ===
- Aashish Kaul as Makrand
- Abeer Singh Godhwani as Game boy Supervillain
- Aayam Mehta as
  - Dr. Rai, Chief at Space Agency
  - Dr. Drona
  - Prachaitha (Werewolf chief)
- Aham Sharma as Dr.Ajay/Vidyut: The Flash Man (2013)
- Ajay Padhye as
  - Dr.Vishwas
  - Anish Gupta
- Ajay Kumar as Fedora
- Akshita Agnihotri as Divya
- Amanpreet Kaur Hundal
- Amit Mistry as
  - Mirror Man
  - Nlick Sabarwal
- Amit Sareen as Mastaan
- Amit Behl as Arvind: Kavi's Father (2015)
- Amit Tandon as Sumit
- Anjali Mukhi as Suhasini: Abhigyaan's ex-girlfriend and Shaurya's mother (2012)
- Ankit Arora as Varun
- Ankit Bathla as Venkat
- Ankit Raaj as Veer: Vampire Prince
- Anupam Shyam as Bhai Sahab (2013)
- Anurag Sharma as Shiv: The Machine Man
- Aryan Vaid as Ashar
- Astha Agarwal as Richa
- Avtar Gill as Captain Kumar
- Barkha Bhist as Arina/Samara/Binaki
- Bharat Chawda as Kara: The Time Stopping Villain
- Bhavesh Balchandani as Tarkush
- Bijay Singh as baba fehmi the Egypt's mummy
- Chetanya Adib as
  - Raghavendra
  - Inspector Rajesh (Delhi Branch)
- Chetan Hansraj as Danny
- Darshan Dave as Dr. Samarth
- Deepali Pansare as Meenakshi
- Dino James as Tittic
- Gavie Chahal as Lahuman
- Imran Khan as
  - Rajan Gupta
  - Dr. Manav
  - Rajat Gupta
- Jesse Randhawa as Interpol agent Maria (2014)
- Jitendra Trehan as Bhupendra
- Jiten Lalwani as
  - Dr Sunil
  - Raja Bhaiyya
  - Vishwajeet
  - Raja Pruthvi Singh
- Jiya Khan as Tina
- Kanishka Soni as Sheila
- Kashmera Shah as Maya (2013)
- Kiran Janjani as Vikaas Nanda
- Kishwer Merchant as
  - Trisha: Tarot Card Reader (2013)
  - Tanzia: Centipede Queen (2015)
- Krish Parekh as
  - A boy in the Market
  - Harshwardhan's relative
- Kunal Seth as Merchent
- Kunal Bakshi as
  - Sahil
  - Vikram/Lion: Abha's former love interest (2013)
  - Noori
  - Mandar
- Kunal Panth as
  - Sailesh
  - Sushant Shrivastav: Fire Man
  - Vicky: Zodiac Warrior Gemini
  - Vinayak
- Lilliput as Chief
- Lavina Tandon as Dolly
- Loveleen Kaur Sasan as
  - Valushka
  - Paridhi
- Madan Lal as himself, cricket expert (2013)
- Mahesh Shetty as Akash: A Electro Man, ACP Diler's Friend
- Manasi Salvi as Advocate Tanisha (2012)
- Manish Bishla as
  - Drug Party Organizer
  - Mr Prabat
- Manish Goel as
  - Dr. Vikram: Sand Man
  - Dhir and Kalachakra (Dhir)
- Meghan Jadhav as Mayo: Lara's Younger Brother
- Mohit Dagga as
  - Kaal: The Melter Man
  - Shamsher Hyderabad Kowaal
- Mohit Sharma as a boy who came to lara's to see lara for marriage
- Monika Bhadoriya as Simran
- Murali Sharma as Rangeela
- Muskan Nancy James
- Narendra Gupta as Harshwardhan
- Navi Bhangu as Mobo-Monster: The Mobile Villain
- Neetha Shetty as
  - Avnita, Bichchuki: The Scorpion Woman
  - Doctor Tanna
- Nikhil Arya as
  - Rangeela: The Painting People Aliver
  - James
- Nirmal Soni as Dance Competition host
- Nishant Singh Malkani as Sameer
- Ojaswi Oberoi as
  - Megna: The Telekinetic Girl (2013)
  - Vidhi
  - Neha
- Omar Vani as
  - Professor Shekhar: Bird Man
  - Kashmir Police Inspector Omar Vani (2014)
- Om Puri as ACP Vishvanath (2013)
- Pallavi Dutta as Teena
- Pankaj Jha as Jogi (Jugraj)
- Payal Rohatgi as Gong: Comic Villain (2013)
- Pooran Kiri as
  - Rustam: Pizza Shop Owner
  - Dr. Sunil
- Parull Chaudhry as Raj Mata: Vampire Queen
- Priya Shinde as
  - Forensic Expert
  - Kachi
- Prakash Ramchandani as Girish Patel
- Preeti Amin
- Preetika Chauhan as
  - Amita
  - Sunnidhi
- Prinal Oberoi as
  - Julie
  - Dolly
- Priyanka Chhabra as Samyra
- Priyanka Singh as
  - Mona
  - Takshita
- Poonam Pandey as
  - Shreya/Menaka, A Mind Controlling Women
- Natasha
- Rahil Azam as
  - Dr. Yudhishtir (2012)
  - Professor Vichitra Vidyut (2016)
- Ravi Gossain as
  - Malhar
  - Sathish
- Raju Kher as Baijo
- Ram Awana as Sardar
- Ravi Gossain as Sathish, Amar
- Raymon Kakar as Village Girl
- Rishina Kandhari as Kiana
- Rituraj Singh as
  - DCP Kamalkant (2012)
  - Nikhil
- Rohit Bakshi as
  - Dr.Danny: The Ice Man
  - Manu: The Romantic Assassin
- Rohit Choudhary as Khajoora, Werewolf king
- Rucha Gujarathi as Sameera
- Ridheema Tiwari as Kaali Pari
- Rushad Rana as
  - Inspector Jaywant's brother
  - Vinit
- Rupa Divetia as Maasi
- Saar Kashyap as
  - Vampire General
  - Brickman
- Saachi Tiwari as Rupal
- Sahab Khan as
  - Doctor Prasad
  - Dr. Shashank
- Sameksha as
  - Queen Mrignaynee
  - Layla :(in Previous birth)/Kaaya: Mayank's love interest
- Sargun Mehta as Sonia: ACP Karanveer's daughter
- Seema Pandey as Inspector Jaykant's Wife
- Shashank Sharma as Suraj
- Sanjay Swaraj as Dr Sharma
- Sandeep Anand as Billu (The Gas Man)
- Sanjeev Siddharth as Rajneesh
- Shaleen Bhanot as Dr. Shizal
- Sheetal Dabholkar as Dr. Saloni (2012)
- Shresth Kumar as Rakesh
- Sheetal Maulik as Nonu's Mother (2016)
- Siddhaanth Vir Surryavanshi as Dr. Dev (2012)
- Shiv Kumar Subramaniam as Dr. Bolt
- Simple Kaul as Komal
- Siraj Mustafa Khan as
  - Jhumlat: The Dream Assassin
  - Vihaan: The Menacing Magician
- Smriti Khanna as Nisha
- Sunayana Fozdar as
  - Megha
  - Aditi
- Surabhi Prabhu
- Swati Kapoor as
  - Miss Kitty
  - Sona
  - Pranali: A healer
- Shraman Jain as Juguna
- Swati Kapoor as Dhara, Angel
- Tanushree Dutta as Reshma
- Vaibhavi Upadhyay as Dr.Sania
- Vibhuti Sharma as Roshni: Mayank's girlfriend
- Vicky Batra as Gogaan: A werewolf
- Vikas Grover as
  - Rahul
  - Akash
- Vinod Singh as Arjun
- Vishal Kotian as
  - Rohan: Magnetic Man
  - Emotional Tinku
  - Atrangi
- Vishal Nayak as Siddharth
- Vishal Puri as Dr.Bedi: The Human Weapon Creator
- Vishal Thakkar as Jagan: The Fire-Fly Man
- Zuber K. Khan as Electro Man

==== For promotion ====
- Maninder Singh as Randeep Rathore to promote 2612 (2012)
- Manoj Bajpayee as CBI Officer Waseem Khan to promote Special 26 (2013)
- Jimmy Sheirgill as Aditya Pratap Singh / Sahab to promote Saheb, Biwi Aur Gangster Returns (2013)
- Mahi Gill as Madhavi Devi to promote Saheb, Biwi Aur Gangster Returns (2013)
- Ayaz Ahmed as Raghu Nayak to promote Do Dil Ek Jaan (2013)
- Rajeev Khandelwal as Samrat Tilakdhari to promote Samrat & Co. (2014)
- Partho Gupte as Arjun Harishchand Waghmare / Raju to promote Hawaa Hawaai (2014)
- Saqib Saleem as Aniket Bhargava / Lucky Sir to promote Hawaa Hawaai (2014)

== Production and broadcast ==
The series was originally a crime investigation series that aired from 15 January 2012 to 14 April 2013 and was named "Hum Ne Li Hai...Shapath". The show was then renamed on 20 April 2013 as "Shapath – SuperCops Vs Super Villains" and entered the science fiction and supernatural genre, the show was again renamed on 21 December 2013 to "SuperCops Vs Super Villains – Shapath". The series was again revamped as "Khoonkhar – SuperCops Vs Super Villains" on 24 December 2016, It ended in February 2017.

=== Dubbed versions ===
It re-aired on Star Utsav as Task Force: Khatarnak Khalnayak and on Star Bharat. It has also been dubbed in Bengali and Telugu.
