= Muskaan Nancy James =

Indian television actress

- Born: Muskaan Arora
- Other names: Nancy James
- Occupation: Actress
- Years active: 2006–2015
- Spouse: Prashant Motwani (m. 2021; div. 2022)

Muskaan Nancy James (also called Nancy James) is an Indian television actress.

== Television ==
Year	Serial	Role	Channel	Notes	Reference
2006–2007	Thodi Khushi Thode Gham	Sapna Shah	Sony Entertainment Television	Supporting Role	
2008–2009	Mata Ki Chowki	Vaishnavi Vansh Kumar	Sahara One	Lead Role	
2009–2011	Mata Ki Chowki	Sakshi Kumar / Sakshi Rudra Narayan	Sahara One	Lead Role	
2009	Ganesh Leela	Vaishnavi Vansh Kumar (Episode 1)	Sahara One	Episodic Role	
2012	Adaalat – Qatal Ka Aakhri Adhyay: Part 1 & Part 2	Tilottama Nikhil Mishra (Episode 128 & Episode 129)	Sony Entertainment Television	Episodic Role	
2012	Fear Files: Darr Ki Sacchi Tasvirein	Episode 7	Zee TV	Episodic Role	
2013	Crime Patrol		Sony Entertainment Television	Episodic Role	
2013	SuperCops Vs SuperVillains – Shapath	Episode 38	Life OK	Episodic Role	
2013–2014	Bharat Ka Veer Putra – Maharana Pratap	Meera	Sony Entertainment Television	Supporting Role	
