= Dil Hi Toh Hai =

Indian television series turned web series

- Genre: Drama; Romantic
- Created by: Ekta Kapoor
- Developed by: Balaji Telefilms
- Written by: Dialogues; Ritu Bhatia
- Screenplay by: Mallika Dutt Gharde
- Story by: Priya Ramanathan
- Directed by: Muzammil Desai; Rahib Siddiqui
- Creative directors: Gargi Malwankar; Chloe Ferns; Suyash Pachauri
- Starring: Karan Kundrra; Yogita Bihani
- Composer: Pamela Jain
- Country of origin: India
- Original language: Hindi
- No. of seasons: 3
- No. of episodes: 155

Production
- Producers: Ekta Kapoor; Shobha Kapoor
- Cinematography: Deepak Malwankar
- Editors: Vikas Sharma; Vishal Sharma
- Camera setup: Multi-camera
- Running time: 22 minutes

Original release
- Network: Sony Entertainment Television
- Release: 18 June 2018 – 19 September 2020

Dil Hi Toh Hai (transl. It is the heart after all) is a romantic drama produced by Ekta Kapoor under Balaji Telefilms. It aired on Sony TV and streams on Alt Balaji. It premiered on 18 June 2018 and stars Karan Kundra and Yogita Bihani.

== Series overview ==
Season	No. of episodes	Season premiere	Season finale
Season 1	90	19 June 2018	2 November 2018
Season 2	34	2 February 2019	20 April 2019
Season 3	31	27 January 2020	19 September 2020

== Plot ==
=== Season 1 ===
Vijaypath Noon, the owner of pharmaceutical company Noon Biotech is a top Indian entrepreneur. A doting son to his mother, he was left by his wife Geeta years ago when their son Ritvik was a child. Vijay is now married to Mamta, a divorcee mother with her son Rishabh. The two also have three children of their own: Reeva and twins, Shanaya and Shivam. A prolific man, Ritvik thinks women are gold diggers as Geeta abandoned Vijaypath in past.

Dr. Palak Sharma, a middle-class girl chose a medical career after losing her brother due to consumption of incorrect medicines given by hospital. Ritvik meets and kisses Palak, mistaking her as his girlfriend. But they eventually become friends. Reeva's fiancé, Samar, elopes with Radhika, an assistant of Palak's mother, Manjeet. Ritvik thinks Palak helped them. Hurt, she quits her job and moves to Mumbai.

==== 3 months later ====
Ritvik's best friend, Rohit, is engaged to Palak's bestfriend, Shweta (Setu). Palak returns to Delhi. Ritvik is set to marry Ananya, Rohit's sister. After knowing Palak's innocence in their past fight, he confesses his love for her but Manjeet, Vijay and Rishabh disapprove. Misunderstandings created by Vijay between the couple make them break up. Manjeet fixes Palak's wedding to Naman Kapoor. Ritvik realises the truth and wants her back. They get married as Naman steps back.

Palak begins working for Vikrant Raheja, Geeta and her second husband's son. Vijay tells Ritvik that Palak and Vikrant have an affair. Later, he understands he is wrong about Palak. She meets Mamta who asks her to leave Ritvik. Suppressing her desire, Palak performs a false affair with Vikrant, leaving Ritvik heartbroken. Palak faints and turns out pregnant in hospital. Sacrificing her love for Ritvik's family, she lies to be pregnant with Vikrant's child.

=== Season 2 ===
After six years, Shivam and Shanaya return home from London due to their mother's insistence. Mamta reveals to Shivam what she had done and that she will die from cancer in six months and asks him to bring back Palak. Palak live with her six-year-old twins, Gia and Dia, who resemble Ritvik in a number of ways, and is struggling financially and only Setu knows her whereabouts that she is in Mussoorie. The Noon family is split, Vijaypath is sick and does not know of Mamta's cancer, Rishabh and his wife left to Australia, Reeva has married Aman and has a daughter Samaira from Angad but despises the former and Ritvik focuses only on business and avoids everyone in the family. Shivam manages to get information about Palak from Setu and offers her job as physiotherapist for his father disguising himself as Sahil Gandhi, however she fails to recognize him. She returns to Delhi with her children only to be surprised by the revelation that she works for the Noons. Ritvik, still angry with her, taunts her about her deceit till she breaks down and reveals that the twins are his children and not Vikrant's. Ritvik then emotionally blackmails Palak into giving him custody of the children. Shanaya and Reeva forgive her and asks her forgiveness after she saves them from marrying men who were after them for their money. She also exposes Rishabh and Shanaya's fiancé to Vijaypath by faking Vijaypath's death and presenting herself as greedy to obtain the Noon Mansion. Vijaypath understands that he has misunderstood her for years. Mamta reveals to Ritvik and family that she had asked Palak to fake her relation with Vikrant so Ritvik is not separated from his family. Guilt-ridden Ritvik decides to leave for London after asking Palak and his children for forgiveness, but Palak and family stops him. While returning, their car meets with an accident.

=== Season 3 ===
Palak escapes unharmed from the accident but Ritvik goes into coma for two years. Palak married Vikrant who had helped the family escape bankruptcy and cared for the twins as a father while everyone was disoriented after the incident. Palak maintains a distance from him as she still loves Ritvik, but Vikrant loves her and promises to wait for her till she can forget Ritvik. The females of the house, Mamta and Vijaypath have accepted Vikrant as a family member for what he did for the Noons, but Shivam and other men of the house are against him. Right before they remove the life support, Ritvik regains consciousness, but has forgotten everything that has happened in the past eight years, including Palak and kids and tries to revert to how he was before he married Palak but can't understand why so much has changed. Setu and Rohit have problems since they have no time for each other except for looking after their three kids. Mamta has survived cancer. Ananya and Shivam are dating. All female members want Palak to remain with Vikrant while the male members try to reunite Ritvik and Palak. Ritvik seems to have feelings for Palak but believes that she is his physiotherapist and is happily married to Vikrant with two twins, while Palak fears that if he is suddenly reminded of his past, he might again become comatose. They avoid each other while Ritvik tries to bring Vikrant and Palak close as asked of him by Mamta. Meanwhile, between all the confusion caused by the two groups supporting different causes, Vikrant asks Vijaypath and prepares to divorce Palak as soon as possible. Shanaya finds herself a prospective groom and the family decides to test him. While preparing for a surprise party to celebrate Setu and Rohit's wedding anniversary in the hope of solving the problems between them, Setu meets with an accident while an angry Rohit gets drunk and sleeps with an unknown girl he met at the bar. The next morning Palak and Ritvik discover what Rohit did and while trying to cover up for him, Vikrant misunderstands that Palak was cheating on him with Ritvik and leaves angrily after giving her the divorce papers despite Ritvik and Palak trying to convince him. Meanwhile Rohit and Setu learn the truth about each other and Setu decides to divorce as well even though others try to cover up Rohit's cheating. Setu tries to commit suicide but is saved by Palak and Vikrant while Ritvik has an attack and remembers some of his past. Vikrant decides not divorce Palak and Ritvik pretends as though he still does not remember Palak as he feels that she and his daughters will be happier with Vikrant and have moved on. Palak understands this and confronts Ritvik but he refuses to accept the truth even though she tells him that she does not love Vikrant. Shivam and Ananya accept their relation in front of the family and their marriage is fixed along with Shanaya's. Vikrant starts to feel insecure about Palak. Reeva, who needs Vikrant’s help in business, advises him to fake having a brain tumor and take Palak along with him to London to separate her from Ritvik but later when she is informed that Ritvik remembers everything and he is sacrificing his love, she feels guilty. Ritvik overhears Reeva telling Vikrant to drop the plan but Vikrant refuses to drop the plan. Ritvik slaps him and goes along with his family to stop Palak at the airport and they reunite.

== Cast ==
=== Main ===
- Karan Kundrra as Ritvik "Ricky" Noon: Vijaypath and Geeta's son; Rishabh’s stepbrother; Reeva, Vikrant, Shanaya and Shivam's half-brother; Palak's husband; Gia and Dia's father (2018–2020)
- Yogita Bihani as Dr. Palak Sharma Noon: Manjeet's daughter; Akshay's sister; Ritvik's wife; Vikrant's former wife; Gia and Dia's mother (2018–2020)

=== Recurring ===
- Paras Arora as Vikrant Raheja: Dheeraj and Geeta's son; Ritvik's half-brother; Palak's former husband (2018–2020)
- Bijay Anand as Vijaypath "Vijay" Noon: Subhadra's son; Geeta's former husband; Mamta's husband; Ritvik, Reeva, Shivam and Shanaya's father; Rishabh's stepfather (2018–2020)
- Shahoor Agha as Subhadra Ramnath Noon: Vijaypath's mother (2018–2019)
- Poonam Dhillon/Rajeshwari Sachdev as Mamta Noon: Balraj's former wife; Vijaypath's wife; Rishabh, Reeva, Shivam and Shanaya's mother; Ritvik's stepmother (2018)/(2018–2019)
- Akshay Dogra/Chaitanya Choudhury as Rishabh Noon: Balraj and Mamta's son; Vijaypath’s stepson / adoptive son; Ritvik's stepbrother; Reeva, Shivam and Shanaya's half-brother; Saanchi's husband (2018)/(2018–2019)
- Sudeepa Singh as Saanchi Noon: Rishabh's wife (2018–2019)
- Paras Kalnawat as Shivam "Shivi" Noon: Vijaypath and Mamta's twin son; Rishabh and Ritvik's half-brother; Reeva's younger and Shanaya's twin brother; Ananya's boyfriend (2019–2020)
  - Gautam Ahuja as Young Shivam "Shivi" Noon (2018)
- Gurpreet Bedi as Reeva Noon Verma: Vijaypath and Mamta's daughter; Rishabh and Ritvik's half-sister; Shivam and Shanaya's sister; Angad's former wife; Aman's wife; Samaira's mother (2018–2019)
- Sanaya Pithawalla as Shanaya Noon Bose: Vijaypath and Mamta's twin daughter; Kartik's wife; Ritvik and Rishabh's half-sister; Reeva's younger and Shivam's twin sister (2019–2020)
  - Pooja Jadhav as Young Shanaya Noon (2018)
- Ritu Vij/Roma Bali as Manjeet Sharma: Palak's mother (2018)/(2018–2019)
- Sanjay Batra as Alok Puri: Meera's husband; Rohit and Ananya's father (2018–2020)
- Madhuri Pandey as Meera Puri: Alok's wife; Rohit and Ananya's mother (2018–2020)
- Aman Chahal as Samar Bhalla: Kulbhushan and Maitri's son; Reeva's ex-fiancé; Radhika's husband (2018)
- Afreen Nasir Dastani as Radhika Bhalla: Manjeet's assistant; Samar's wife (2018)
- Sandeep Rajora as Kulbhushan Bhalla: Maitri's husband; Samar's father (2018)
- Aradhna Uppal as Maitri Bhalla: Kulbhushan's wife; Samar's mother (2018)
- Farida Dadi as Tarika “Tadi” Verma: Aman's grandmother (2018-2020)
- Tuhina Vohra as Geeta Raheja: Vijaypath's former wife; Ritvik and Vikrant's mother (2018–2019)
- Abhinav Kapoor as Aman Verma: Ritvik's friend; Reeva's husband; Samaira's adoptive and stepfather (2018–2020)
- Asmita Sood as Shweta "Setu" Puri: Palak's friend; Kabir's former wife; Rohit's wife (2018–2020)
- Krishna Shetty as Rohit Puri: Alok and Meera's son; Ananya's brother; Ritvik's friend; Shweta's husband (2018–2020)
- Poulomi Das as Ananya "Ani" Puri: Alok and Meera's daughter; Rohit's sister; Ritvik's ex-fiancé; Shivam's girlfriend (2018–2020)
- Aly Goni as Naman Kapoor: Sanjeev's brother; Palak's ex-fiancé (2018)
- Bhavya Sachdeva as Sanjeev Kapoor: Naman's brother (2018)
- Pooja Banerjee as Aarohi Trivedi: Palak's friend; Ritvik's former girlfriend (2018)
- Keith Sequeira/Mukul Harish as Vivek: Ritvik's friend; Aarohi's employer and love interest (2018)/(2018)
- Bikramjeet Kanwarpal as surgeon
- Gaurav Venkatesh as Robin Das: Ritvik's secretary (2018)
- Manoj Chandila as Kabir Agarwal: Ritvik and Rohit's friend; Shweta's former husband (2018)
- Shiny Doshi (Guest at Reeva's engagement)
- Anjum Fakih (Performer at Ritvik & Ananya's sangeet)
- Karan Thakur as Angad Kashyap: Reeva's ex-husband; Samaira's biological father (2018)
- Palak Purswani as Pragati Dixit: Shweta's assistant; Palak's friend; Shivam's friend and ex-girlfriend (2019)
- Shanaya Vijay as Gia Noon: Ritvik and Palak's twin daughter; Dia's twin sister (2020)
- Samaira Vijay as Dia Noon: Ritvik and Palak's twin daughter; Gia's twin sister (2020)
- Sumbul Touqeer Khan as Taashu, Shivam and Shanaya's classmate. (2018)
- Rachana Mistry as Rachna, Ritwik's friend at the gym.

== Production ==
The first promo of the show was shot in Lavasa. Also in 2018, the team shot some scenes in Rajasthan.
