= Zindagi Badal Sakta Hai Hadsaa =

- Promotional logo for "Zindagi Badal Sakta Hai Haadsa"
- Created by: Fireworks Productions, Artistic Unlimited Production
- Directed by: B.P.Singh & Yash Chauhan
- Starring: see below
- Opening theme: "Zindagi Badal Sakta Hai Haadsa" by Vinod Pandol & Jai Singh
- Country of origin: India
- No. of episodes: 48

Production
- Producers: B.P.Singh & Pradeep Uppoor
- Running time: 24 minutes

Original release
- Network: Zee TV
- Release: 9 May – 24 August 2008

Zindagi Badal Sakta Hai Hadsaa (English life can be changed to an incident) was a Hindi television thriller series broadcast on Zee TV, from 9 May to 24 August 2008. It replaced the comedy-drama series Chaldi Da Naam Gaddi, taking its timeslot.

== Concept ==
The concept of Hadsaa is based on real-life events and it shows how one incident (hadsaa) can change peoples' lives forever. The show revolves around a team known as STF — Special Task Force — that helps solve problems and crimes.

The show has episodic stories of crimes. Each episode has an emotional story with a hooker and how that hadsaa changes that story is the main point of the episode. In addition, the purpose of haadsa is to bring to light what the common people probably do not know about the evil people — stories of stolen bread eaters of the family maimed for life, of children orphaned and parents left childless.

== Cast ==
- Mohan Kapoor ... ACP Manoviraj Singh (Head of STF)
- Karan Oberoi (singer) ... Inspector Abhimanyu Singh/Abhi (younger brother of Manoviraj Singh)
- Khalid Siddiqui as Inspector Ekaansh Thakur (deputy head of STF)
- Pooja Bharti ... Inspector Divyanka Chauhan (STF officer from Kashmir's branch)
- Himani Chawla ... Inspector Gurinder Kaur/Garry (STF officer from Punjab's branch)
- Mehul Buch
- Lata Sabharwal
- Mouli Ganguly
- Gautam Chaturvedi
- Mihir Mishra
- Simple Kaul
- Monaz Mevawala
- Kanwaljit Singh
- Mohit Chauhan
- Shruti Ulfat
- Narayani Shastri
- Shraddha Nigam
- Ashish Nayyar
