= Laut Aao Trisha =

- Genre: Thriller; Drama
- Created by: 24 Frames Media
- Written by: Damini Shetty; Deepak Malik; Abhishek Pathak (Season 2)
- Directed by: Nandita Mehra; Ishwar Singh; Ismail Umar Khan
- Starring: Bhagyashree Patwardhan; Jai Kalra; Eijaz Khan; Nalini Negi
- Theme music composer: Salim–Sulaiman; Aashish Rego
- Opening theme: Salim–Sulaiman
- Country of origin: India
- Original language: Hindi
- No. of seasons: 1
- No. of episodes: 175

Production
- Producers: Bhairavi Raichura; B.P. Singh; Pradeep Uppoor; Nandita Mehra
- Editor: Sagar Patil
- Running time: approximately 45 minutes
- Production company: 24 Frames Media

Original release
- Network: Life OK
- Release: 21 July 2014 – 24 April 2015

Laut Aao Trisha is an Indian serial on Life OK, based on the Chilean telenovela ¿Dónde está Elisa? produced by TVN, which has had many other international adaptations. It was first about an 18-year-old girl Trisha, who goes missing after a beach party with friends, and how her mother struggles to get her back. But later after a format change the serial revolves around several other criminal cases who Advocate VK along with his secretary Trisha solves.

== Cast ==
- Bhagyashree Patwardhan as Amrita Prateek Swaika
- Eijaz Khan as A.C.P Kabir Rana
- Jai Kalra as Prateek Swaika
- Nalini Negi as Advocate Trisha Swaika
- Sumeet Vyas as Advocate Vynavin "VK" Kumar (122-present)
- Gurpreet Bedi as Suhana (122-present) (VK's Boss)
- Rishi Khurana as Inspector Abhay Singh
- Jiten Lalwani as Gaurav Swaika
- Riyanka Chanda as Shaina
- Adita Wahi as Sonali Gaurav Swaika
- Rajeshwari Sachdev as Lavanya Swaika / Lavanya Kushan Garewal
- Ayaz Khan as Kushan Garewal
- Karan Jotwani as Vivan Swaika
- Rucha Gujarathi as Mrs. Rana (Kabir's wife)
- Abhilash Kumar as Bobby Garewal
- Omar Vani as Prem Nanda
- Bhairavi Raichura as Varsha Malhotra / Janvi Shah
- Suzi Khan as Young Trisha Swaika
- Harshaali Malhotra as Sanya Swaika
- Saar Kashyap as Ankit
- Manoj Chandila as Inspector Jagatjeet

== Episodic appearances ==
- Rishina Kandhari as Inspector Reshma (Episode 124 & Episode 125)
- Imran Khan in Episode 124 & Episode 125
- Priya Shinde as Taapti Fauzdar (Episode 124 & Episode 125)
- Tiya Gandwani as Dr. Rita (Episode 126)
- Neetha Shetty as Shanaya (Episode 128)
- Akshay Sethi in Episode 142
- Pariva Pranati as Mallika (Episode 151 - Episode 155)
- Alefia Kapadia as Deepika (Episode 156 - Episode 160)
- Amit Dolawat as Abhay (Episode 156 - Episode 160)
- Kapil Arya as Ghatotkach (Episode 124 - Episode 175)
