= Anushka Singh =

Indian television actress (born 1964)

- Born: 9 November 1964 (age 61); Bombay, Maharashtra, India
- Occupation: Actress
- Years active: 2006–present
- Known for: Mata Ki Chowki
- Spouse: Vaibhav (m. 2017)
- Children: 1 daughter

Anushka Singh (born 9 November 1964) is an Indian model and actress who has worked in Hindi television serials and short films.

== Television ==
Year	Serial	Role
2006–2007	Barrister Roy	
2007	Aahat	Saloni's Colleague (Episode 1)
2007	Aahat	Amrita (Episode 11)
2007	Aahat	Riya (Episode 16)
2007	C.I.D.	Kartika (Episode 478)
2007	C.I.D.	Episode 488
2008	C.I.D.	Episode 504
2010–2011	Mata Ki Chowki	Savita Vishnu Narayan
2011–2012	Don't Worry Chachu	Rekha Chirag Desai
2012	Crime Patrol	
2012–2016	Savdhaan India	Amandeep (Episode 65 & Episode 66)
2012–2016	Savdhaan India	Uma (Episode 41)
2012–2016	Savdhaan India	Archana Arvind Gupta (Episode 182)
2012–2016	Savdhaan India	Suman (Episode 763)
2012–2016	Savdhaan India	Shraddha Sharma (Episode 1352)
2012–2016	Savdhaan India	Manisha (Episode 1561)
2012–2016	Savdhaan India	Shilpi (Episode 1628)
2012–2016	Savdhaan India	Amit's Wife (Episode 1694)
2012–2016	Savdhaan India	Dr. Madhu (Episode 1776)
2013	Bani – Ishq Da Kalma	Mrs. Singh
2013	Arjun	Pushpa Chhabria (Episode 85)
2013	Devon Ke Dev...Mahadev	Maharani Sumitra
2014	Gustakh Dil	Aditi
2014	Qubool Hai	Munisha
2015	Crime Patrol	Meenakshi Sushant Nikam (Episode 520)
2017	Gangaa	Riya Jha
