= Pind Peya Saara Jombieland Baneya =

2025 Indian-Punjabi language film

- Directed by: Deepak Thapar
- Written by: Deepak Thapar
- Produced by: Neeraj Ruhil; Subhav Sharma
- Starring: Binnu Dhillon; G Khan; Kanika Mann; Angira Dhar; Guri Ghuman
- Cinematography: Sukh Kamboj
- Edited by: Rikki
- Music by: Avvy Sra & N Vee (songs); Kevin Roy George (background score)
- Production company: Next Level Productions
- Distributed by: White Hill Studios
- Release date: 13 June 2025
- Country: India
- Language: Punjabi

Pind Peya Saara Jombieland Baneya (transl. The whole village has become 'Jombieland') or simply Jombieland is a 2025 Indian Punjabi-language zombie comedy film written and directed by Deepak Thapar. It stars Binnu Dhillon, G Khan, Kanika Mann, Angira Dhar, Guri Ghuman and Dhanveer Singh. It is produced by Neeraj Ruhil and Subhav Sharma under the banner Next Level Productions. Sukh Kamboj handles the cinematography and editing by Rikki.

It was released theatrically on 13 June 2025. A sequel is in development and planned to release in 2027.

== Plot ==
In December 2025, a village on the outskirts of Chandigarh, Punjab, India is thrown into chaos by the deadly Cordyceps virus, which sparks an unexpected zombie apocalypse. Amidst the madness, the story follows Jeeti and Koko, two lovers battling family opposition to be together, until their fight for love turns into a desperate fight for survival.

== Cast ==
- Binnu Dhillon as Jatinder "Jeeti" Singh
- G Khan as 33
- Kanika Mann as Koko
- Angira Dhar as Aanchal Hooda
- Gurteg Guri Ghuman
- Dhanveer Singh
- Gurpreet Bhangu
- Aman Sutdhar
- Jass Dhillon as 34

== Soundtrack ==
Pind Peya Saara Jombieland Baneya

Soundtrack album by Avvy Sra & N Vee
- Released: 2025
- Recorded: 2025
- Genre: Feature film soundtrack
- Length: 9:58
- Language: Punjabi
- Label: Tips Punjabi

The film's songs were composed by Avvy Sra and N Vee. The background score was composed by Kevin Roy George. The first single "Duniya" was released on 25 May 2025. The second single "Mad Bunny" was released on 6 June 2025 and the third single "Kala Daur" was released on 20 June 2025.

No.	Title	Lyrics	Music	Singer(s)	Length
1.	"Duniya"	Khara	Avvy Sra	B Praak	3:28
2.	"Mad Bunny"	Khara	Avvy Sra	Jasmine Sandlas, Sukhe	3:07
3.	"Kala Daur"	Khara	N Vee	G Khan, Khara	3:23

== Release ==
Jombieland was released theatrically worldwide on 13 June 2025.

== Reception ==
Manik Sharma of OTTPlay wrote "Led by an excellent Binnu Dhillon, Jombieland is what mainstream cinema ought to deliver for the price of a premium film ticket. A thrilling, riotous theatrical experience that you’d fish cinema lovers could experience in the language of its origin."
