= Bang Baang =

Web series (2021)

- Promotional poster
- Also known as: Bang Baang – The Sound Of Crimes
- Genre: Action and crime
- Created by: Ekta Kapoor; ALTBalaji
- Written by: Chirag Salian; Abhishek Garg
- Story by: Chirag Salian; Abhishek Garg
- Directed by: Shraddha Pasi
- Creative director: Nisha Acharya
- Starring: Faisal Shaikh; Ruhi Singh
- Composer: Smk Music Studio Production
- Country of origin: India
- Original language: Hindi
- No. of seasons: 1
- No. of episodes: 10

Production
- Executive producer: Ashwarya Vats
- Editors: Vikas Sharma; Shamim Masrur Khan
- Running time: 22 Minutes
- Production company: Zee Entertainment Enterprises

Original release
- Network: ALTBalaji; ZEE5
- Release: 25 January 2021

Bang Baang – The Sound of Crimes is an Indian Hindi-language murder and suspense drama web series streaming on ZEE5 and ALTBalaji. The lead roles in this web series are played by Mr. Faisu and Ruhi Singh, Ashu Yadav, who are also the internet celebrities of India. It released on 25 January 2021. It is directed by Shraddha Pasi Jairath, produced by Akshay BP Singh of Spacewalkker Films, and co-produced by Dayanand Shetty.

== Plot ==
A dead body is found in the lands of Udaipur where Inspector Meera is awarded the responsibility to solve the case. The daughter of the Royals of Udaipur goes missing five years ago. The clues found while investigating this dead body makes everyone believe that is the dead body of Princess Ramona. On this corpse, a scarf is found that hints towards Raghu being involved in the murder.

== Cast ==
- Faisal Shaikh as Raghu
- Ruhi Singh as Meera
- Aman Gandotra as Rohan
- Ratnakar Upadhayay as Vikram
- Gurpreet Bedi as Monisha
- Sharik Khan as vinay, Raghu's friend
- Shreya Gupto as Ramona
- Gargi Sawant as Shimona
- Amit Jairath as Jatin
- Prachi Vaishnav as Poonam
- Semal Bhatt as Ajay

== Episodes ==
No.	Title	Directed by	Original release date
1	"Welcome To Udaipur"	Shraddha Pasi	25 January 2021
Meera drops from her engagement party when she gets the news about a dead body. She finds an unsettling connection with the discovered corpse. Raghu gets a warning message asking him to not return to Udaipur. Is Raghu also one of the culprits of Ramona’s murder?
2	"And They Meet Again"	Shraddha Pasi	25 January 2021
The Dhanraj family is in shock and completely broken with the news of Ramona’s death. Meanwhile, Meera’s investigation leads her to the prime suspect in Ramona’s murder. Raghu misleads the Police trail by visiting his friend’s place, Ajay.
3	"The Rear Window Game"	Shraddha Pasi	25 January 2021
Meera visits Ajay’s house buy finds Tanya there. Tanya is Ajay’s neighbour who tells Meera everything that happened last night. Monisha assigns a task to Raghu by threatening him. Raghu and Meera find a package hidden by Ajay but lost it during the attack. They find Ajay’s dead body in a suitcase on a trail to find him.
4	"Fly Before You Die"	Shraddha Pasi	25 January 2021
Raghu suspects that Monisha has planned the attack. Meera follows Raghu to a market in Udaipur. Monisha kidnaps Meera and Raghu, but the duo escapes somehow from this. After a while, Monisha is followed to a cottage where her dead body is found.
5	"The Infamous Reunion Party"	Shraddha Pasi	25 January 2021
Monisha is killed and the Raghu is caught as a prime suspect. He is interrogated as a suspect for killing Monisha. He reaches the reunion party location where he tells Meera and Rohan about all the events that happened that night. At the same time, the forensic lab catches fire before Polic could ascertain Ramona’s DNA result.
6	"She Is Back!"	Shraddha Pasi	25 January 2021
Dhanraj family is furious about continuous failure in catching Ramona’s killers. Meera reaches Mumbai to arrest Raghu but gets involved in Pari’s rescue operation. A threatening note terrifies Shimona, in between all this. Is Princess Ramona hiding something?
7	"Mask Man Revealed"	Shraddha Pasi	25 January 2021
Raghu is trying to find the identity of the masked man. In a pretext, Raghu meets Ritesh Mehra and follows him to a secluded house. He overhears a conversation between Ritesh and Siddharth. Meera, on the other hand, is with Shimona when someone fires at her and Siddharth Mehra loses his life.
8	"Who's Next?"	Shraddha Pasi	25 January 2021
When Siddharth dies, Ramona’s case is closed. Raghu, however, finds evidence to prove that the princess is alive. A new clue leads to him and Meera to Princess’s hideout.
9	"The Deadly Treasure Hunt"	Shraddha Pasi	25 January 2021
Raghu is finding and chasing the masked man. Rohan helps Meera hack Princess Ramona’s laptop. They find Ramona’s video message and understand the events of the reunion party. Raghu locks Meera and Rohan in a secret room at gunpoint.
10	"Final Bang Baang"	Shraddha Pasi	25 January 2021
Raghu finds out the identity of the mastermind who planned attacks on Meera. Dhanraj tries to flee from the city. The mastermind and his accomplice are defeated at the end in an adrenaline-rush chase through the city.

== Reception ==
=== Critical reception ===
Kunal Kothari from IndiaForums says that Bang Baang is a juvenile attempt but a whistle-worthy guilty pleasure for everyone or anyone. He also says that the movie has too many twists and turns but it all makes the series very predictable. IndiaForums rated Bang Baang at 1.5/5 stars.

As per Binged team, It has underwhelming climax and juvenile suspense as per the review by binged team. The Binged rating for Bang Baang is 3/10.
