= Palak Purswani =

Indian actress and model

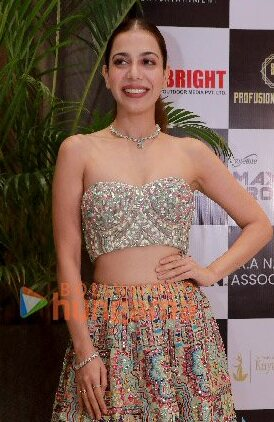
- Palak in 2023
- Born: 12 August 1993 (age 33); Nagpur, Maharashtra, India
- Occupations: Actress; model
- Years active: 2014–present
- Known for: Bigg Boss OTT 2; MTV Splitsvilla Season 7; Yeh Rishtey Hain Pyaar Ke; Roohaniyat

Palak Purswani (born 12 August 1993) is an Indian actress and model who primarily works in Hindi television. She started her career with MTV's reality show MTV Splitsvilla Season 7 and has been active in the television industry since 2014. She had worked in television serials like Yeh Rishtey Hain Pyaar Ke, Meri Hanikarak Biwi, Ek Aastha Aisi Bhee, Badii Devrani, and Bade Bhaiyya Ki Dulhania. She has also been featured in the web series on MX Player named 'Roohaniyat'. She is seen in the second season of Bigg Boss OTT which is hosted by Salman Khan.

== Early life and education ==
Palak Purswani was born in Nagpur, Maharashtra. She did her schooling at Centre Point School, Nagpur. After completing her schooling, Palak pursued her graduation in Fashion Designing from the International Institute of Fashion Design.

== Personal life ==
In 2019, Palak started dating Avinash Sachdev and later got engaged to him but they broke up after some time.

== Career ==
Palak Purswani started her career in 2014 with MTV Splitsvilla season 7 and the TV serial Badii Devrani (2015). Next, she appeared in Bade Bhaiyya Ki Dulhania (2016). In 2017 she did two shows Ek Aastha Aisi Bhee and Meri Hanikarak Biwi. She featured as 'Shweta' in Star Plus’ TV serial Yeh Rishtey Hain Pyaar Ke in 2019.

In 2019, she participated in the dance reality show Nach Baliye 9 as a wild card contestant. Palak performed in Durga - Mata Ki Chhaya in 2020.

Palak made her web-series debut with ALT Balaji's Dil Hi Toh Hai Season 2 in 2019. She was also featured on Voot's The Raikar Case in 2020 and her latest appearance was in MX-Player’s Roohaniyat for both seasons.

In 2023, Palak entered Bigg Boss OTT Season 2 House as a contestant. Palak was evicted from the show on 25 June, being a second contestant to be eliminated from the BB house.

== Filmography ==
=== Television ===
Year	Title	Role	Notes	Ref.
2014	MTV Spitsvilla (Season 7)	Contestant	12th place	
2015	Badii Devrani			
2016	Bade Bhaiyya Ki Dulhania	Rhea Raizada		
2017	Ek Aastha Aisi Bhee	Radhika		
2017	Meri Hanikarak Biwi	Bhoomi Pandey		
2019	Yeh Rishtey Hain Pyaar Ke	Shweta		
2019	Nach Baliye (Season 9)	Contestant	9th place	
2020	Durga – Mata Ki Chhaya	Geetu		
2023	Bigg Boss OTT (Season 2)	Contestant	14th place	
2024	Dabangii – Mulgii Aayi Re Aayi	Zai Rajyavadhkar		

=== Web series ===
Year	Title	Role	Ref.
2019	Dil Hi to Hai 2	Pragati Dixit	
2020	The Raikar Case		
2022	Roohaniyat	Anita "Anu" Malkani	
2024	Flight Attendant		

== See also ==
- List of Indian television actresses
- List of Hindi television actresses
