= Vivan Bhatena =

Indian actor (born 1978)

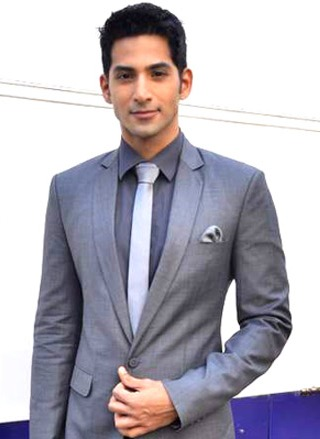
- Bhatena in 2013
- Born: 28 October 1978 (age 47); Bombay, Maharashtra, India
- Occupations: Model; Actor
- Years active: 2004–present
- Spouse: Nikhila Bhatena (m. 2007)
- Children: 1 (daughter born 2019)

Vivan Bhatena (born 28 October 1978) is an Indian model, actor and photographer. He appears predominantly in Hindi films and his notable films include Dangal (2016), Judwaa 2 (2017) and Raja the Great (2017). Vivan won Mister India World title in 2001. In 2016, he was a contestant on Fear Factor: Khatron Ke Khiladi 7.

== Early life and education ==
Bhatena was born to a Parsi father and a Maharasthrian mother, and grew up watching Hollywood, Hindi as well Marathi movies, earning an MBA before entering the entertainment industry as a fashion model.

== Career ==
Bhatena moved from modelling to acting with his first television role as Tulsi Virani's son-in-law Abhishek in Kyunki Saas Bhi Kabhi Bahu Thi. He later appeared in Maayka, Kumkum - Ek Pyara Sa Bandhan and Pyaar Ka Bandhan. Bhatena, the 2001 "Mr. India" title holder, was also seen on the stage in Sandiip Sikcand's Champagne On The House. He was also seen in Falguni Pathak's video Maine Payal Hai Chankaayi.

== Filmography ==
- All films and series are in Hindi, unless mentioned otherwise.

=== Feature films ===
Year	Title	Role	Notes
2007	Chak De! India	Abhimanyu Singh	Debut film
2008	Rab Ne Bana Di Jodi		
2010	Karthik Calling Karthik	Ashish	
2012	Talaash	Armaan Kapoor	
2015	Hero	Ranvijay Shekhawat	
2015	Katti Batti	Ricky	
2016	Dangal	Harkinder	
2017	Raja the Great	Devaraj	Telugu film
2017	Judwaa 2	Alex	
2018	Hate Story 4	Aryan	
2019	Amavas	Sameer	
2021	Sooryavanshi	Inspector Vivaan Singh	
2022	Bimbisara	Subhramanya Shastri	Telugu film
2023	Bloody Daddy	Vicky	JioCinema
2025	120 Bahadur	Jamedar Surja Ram	Amazon Prime

=== Television ===
Year	Title	Role	Notes
2004–2005	Kyunki Saas Bhi Kabhi Bahu Thi	Abhishek	Debut show
2004–2005	Kkehna Hai Kuch Mujhko		
2005	Time Bomb 9/11		
2006	Vaidehi	Inspector Akash Jaisingh	
2006–2007	Kumkum – Ek Pyara Sa Bandhan	Dhruv Wadhwa	
2007–2008	Chhoona Hai Aasmaan	Flight Lieutenant Samrat Singh Shekhawat / Jahan Sheikh	
2007–2009	Maayka	Shabd Sareen	
2008–2009	Chand Ke Paar Chalo	Rahul Oberoi	
2009–2010	Pyaar Ka Bandhan	Shashank Malhotra	
2010	Aahat	Himself	
2011	Sanskaar Laxmi	Parag Purohit	
2016	Fear Factor: Khatron Ke Khiladi 7	Contestant	7th place

=== Web series ===
Year	Title	Role	Notes
2021	Ramyug	Hanuman	MX Player series
2023	Kafas	Vikram Bajaj	SonyLIV series
2023	Bambai Meri Jaan	Abdullah	Amazon Prime Video series
2023	Raisinghani vs Raisinghani	Ishaan Talwar	SonyLIV series
