= Ramyug =

- Directed by: Kunal Kohli
- Starring: Diganth Manchale; Akshay Dogra; Aishwarya Ojha; Kabir Duhan Singh; Vivan Bhatena; Navdeep
- Music by: Sajid–Wajid
- Country of origin: India
- Original language: Hindi
- No. of seasons: 1
- No. of episodes: 8

Production
- Producers: Ravina Kohli; Niharika Kotwal
- Editor: Saurabh Gaur

Original release
- Network: MX Player
- Release: 7 May 2021

Ramyug is a 2021 Indian Hindi mythological series directed by Kunal Kohli starring Diganth Manchale, Akshay Dogra, Aishwarya Ojha, Kabir Duhan Singh, Vivan Bhatena, and Navdeep.

== Plot ==
It highlights the journey of Lord Rama from being a young prince of Ayodhya to the righteous ruler establishing Ram Raj, the golden era of mankind.

== Cast ==
- Diganth Manchale as Rama
- Akshay Dogra as Lakshmana
- Aishwarya Ojha as Sita
- Kabir Duhan Singh as Ravana
- Vivan Bhatena as Hanuman
- Navdeep as Vibhishana
- John Kokken as Meghnath

== Reception ==
A critic from News18 wrote, "Projects such as Ramyug will always be open to unfair comparisons but this is as bad as it can get. Let alone trying to bank on it’s mass appeal, director Kunal Kohli should hope that not many come across his uninteresting take on Ramayan". A critic from film Companion wrote, "To breathe an ancient text, like the Ramayana, with life, you must have conviction, something new to add, something new to say. Otherwise, it festers like this 8 episode saga".
