= Maharakshak: Devi =

Indian television series

- Show logo
- Genre: Children's television series Action; Thriller; Fantasy
- Created by: Essel Vision Productions
- Directed by: Vaibhav Mutha
- Country of origin: India
- Original language: Hindi
- No. of seasons: 1
- No. of episodes: 26

Production
- Producer: Essel Vision Productions
- Running time: 50 minutes

Original release
- Network: Zee TV
- Release: 14 March – 7 June 2015

Maharakshak: Devi is a 2015 Indian superhero fantasy television children's television series about Devi/Durga reincarnated as a teenage girl in modern Mumbai.

== Plot ==
The series follows the story of Gauri, who is an incarnation of the Hindu Goddess Devi/Durga. During the first 17 years of her life, Gauri is raised and trained by her Guru, Brihaspati, who found her floating in the river when she was an infant. She eventually battles various asuras that exist in the contemporary world (Bhasmasura, Kumbhakarna, Mahishasura, Jalandhara, Raktabīja and Sumbha and Nisumbha) under the service of their Guru, Shukracharya. Her companions and advisors are Brihaspati, Tiger, Parijaat, Inspector Narayan, and Krishna.

== Cast ==
- Umang Jain as Gauri/Devi/Durga
- Rohit Bakshi as Brihaspati/Professor Jayant
- Indraneil Sengupta as Shukracharya/Virat Mittal
- Karan Suchak as Inspector Narayan/Narada
- Shresth Kumar as Krishna
- Sahil Uppal as Tiger
- Ankit Gera as Bhasma/Bhasmasura
- Varun Kapoor as Mahish/Mahishasura
- Rushiraj Pawar as Parijaat
- Nikita Sharma as Vedika
- Kamalika Guha Thakurta as Meena
- Ujjwal Gauraha as Jalandhar
- Tarun Khanna as Raktabija

== Development ==
In response to a perceived lack of superheroes in Indian films, Zee TV launched its Maharakshak superhero franchise in 2014 with the three-month serial, Maharakshak: Aryan. It was followed in 2015 with the second instalment, the three month series, Maharakshak: Devi (while the network originally planned for the franchise to consist of three series, only two have been released to date). Maharakshak: Devi was conceived of as a vehicle to highlight female empowerment. Umang Jain was cast in the dual roles of Gauri/Devi, partly due to her background as a dancer and a brown belt in the martial arts. Jain states that she was drawn to the role because it was a challenging one.
