= Mata Ki Chowki =

Indian drama television series

- TV release poster for Mata ki Chowki
- Directed by: Rajesh Ram Singh; Ranjan Kumar Singh
- Starring: Shantipriya; Gautam Rode; Richa Mukherjee; Sai Ballal; Simran Sharma; Muskaan Nancy James; Sangeeta Khanayat; Ankit Bathla
- Theme music composer: Dony Hazarika
- Composer: Dony Hazarika
- Country of origin: India
- No. of episodes: 845

Production
- Running time: 25 Minutes

Original release
- Network: Sahara One
- Release: 9 June 2008 – 7 October 2011

Mata ki Chowki is an Indian television series produced by Swastik Pictures, which aired on Sahara One from 9 June 2008 to 7 October 2011. The series produced 845 episodes.

== Plot ==
Mata ki Chowki follows the story of a girl known as Vaishnavi, a great devotee of the Goddess Vaishno Devi, and details events in her life concerning her faith.

Vaishnavi is an orphan child who later finds herself adopted by Shradhha & Vidyasagar. Throughout her life, Vaishnavi's devotion towards Mata Vaishno Devi is seen in the miracles that occur in her favour and the struggles she encounters. Season 2 revolves around Vaishnavi's daughter, Sakshi. The third season covers the life of Sakshi's daughters, Nisha and Asha.

== Cast ==
- Shantipriya as Mata Vaishno Devi
- Ishita Vyas as Devi Kali
- Richa Mukherjee as Child Vaishnavi (2008).
- Sai Ballal as Pandit Vidyasagar (Vaishnavi's foster father). He is Shraddha's husband and a priest of the Maa Vaishno Devi temple in Bhadarwaan village.
- Mona Ambegaonkar as Shraddha Sagar (Vaishnavi's foster mother & Sonakshi's biological mother).
- Muskaan Nancy James as Vaishnavi Sagar / Vaishnavi Vansh Kumar (Season-1). She is very innocent and a true devotee of Mata Vaishno Devi.
- Rahul Raj Singh as Vansh Kumar (Vaishnavi's Husband).
- Sudesh Berry as Sheel Kumar (Bade Papa /Prabhuji), Vansh, Yash and Gautam's father, Ambika's husband and Sabhya's elder brother.
- Sheela Sharma as Ambika Sheel Kumar (Badi Maa), Vansh, Yash and Gautam's mother.
- Tarun Khanna as Yash Kumar, the eldest son of Sheel Kumar and Gauri's father.
- Riddhima Tiwari as Arpita Yash Kumar, Gauri's mother.
- Krishna Soni as Gautam Kumar, an elder jobless son of Sheel Kumar (2008-2009).
- Minakshi Sahane as Lata Mousi (Vidyasagar's home caretaker).
- Giriraj Kabra as Madhav (Vaishnavi's silent lover).
- Zahida Parveen as Sanyukta Gautam Kumar (Badi Bhabhi), Gautam's wife and the elder daughter-in-law of Sheel Kumar.
- Bharat Kaul as Sabhya Kumar (Chhote Papa), Sheel Kumar's brother, Priyamvada's husband and Moksh's father.
- Usha Bachani as Priyamvada Sabhya Kumar (Chhoti Maa), Moksh's mother and Sabhya's wife.
- Sachal Tyagi as Moksh Kumar, Madhura's husband and Mansi and Kannu's father.
- Seema Malik as Madhura Moksh Kumar (Chhoti Bhabhi), Moksh's wife, Mansi, and Kannu's mother.
- Shaika Parveen as Sonakshi (Chulbuli) (Vaishnavi's foster sister).
- Adita Wahi as Natasha, Vansh's girlfriend and the daughter of Tantrik Baba.
- Sikandar Kharbanda as Munna Rajdan (Sanyukta's elder brother).
- Unknown child as young Sonakshi Sagar (Chhoti Chulbuli).
- Nitin Trivedi as Natasha's father / Tantrik Baba.
- Mehul Nisar as Gulfam 'Gullu' (Abdul Chacha's son).
- Poonam Joshi as Monica, Sabhya's girlfriend.
- Gajendra Chauhan as Narayan.
- Simran Sharma as Child Sakshi (Lt. Vansh-Vaishnavi's daughter).
- Sudha Chandran as Mahashweta Devi/Fake Mata Rani.
- Gautam Rode as Aman (Sheel-Shweta's Illegal Son) Prabhuji's devotee.
- Chetan Hansraj / Harsh Vashisht as Rudra (Bali) Narayan (Sakshi's husband). He is Hari Narayan and Kusum's youngest son.
- Vishnu Sharma as Hari Narayan (Sakshi's father-in-law), the patriarch of the Narayan Family and a wealthy businessman.
- Shreedhara / Tiya Gandwani as Kkusumganga Hari Narayan (Sakshi's mother-in-law).
- Siddharth Dhawan as Vishnu Narayan (Sakshi's Jeth).
- Anushka Singh as Savita Vishnu Narayan (Sakshi's Jethani).
- Dhriti Bhatia as Mata Rani Baal Roop/ Chhoti Durga.
- Himani Chawla as Radha Rudra Narayan (Bali's 1st wife/Sakshi's Soutan).
- Deepti Dhyani as Maya Rudra Narayan (Bali's 2nd wife/Sakshi's Soutan).
- Sangeeta Khanayat as Asha Narayan (Sakshi's young daughter).
- Svetlana Mishra as Nisha Narayan (Sakshi's elder daughter).
- Ankit Bathla/Suman Dey as Arjun (Asha's husband).
- Anshul Singh as Shakti.
- Pankaj Kumar as Yamdev (Vaishnavi's Mahasankap track).
- Unknown person as Brahm Dev (Vaishnavi's Panch-dev Pariksha track).
- Unknown person as Mata Rani ka Kishori roop (Mrs. Sanghvi's track).
- Unknown person as Gauri Yash Kumar (Vaishnavi's Niece).
- Ashalata Wabgaonker as Dadi Maa (Sheel and Sabhya's mother, Vansh, Yash, Gautam, and Moksh's grandmother).
- Reshmi Ghosh as Nirti Maa.
- Vaidehi Dhamecha as Grown-up Mansi Moksh Kumar (Moksh and Madhura's daughter).
- Samaira Rao as Grown-up Gauri Yash Kumar (Yash and Arpita's daughter).
- Vibhuti Patil Thakur as Shyama Hari Narayan (Hari Narayan and Kusum's daughter, Vinod's wife, Rudra, Vishnu, and Dheeraj's sister).
- Paras Thukral as Vinod (Shyama's husband, Hari Narayan, and Kusum's son-in-law).
- Ritwik Dhanjani as Dheeraj Hari Narayan (Rudra and Vishnu's youngest brother).
- Neeral Bhardwaj as Bhoomi.
- Jitendra Trehan as Ram Chacha.
- Iklaq Khan as Abdul Chacha (Vidyasagar's neighbour, Gullu's father).
- Muskaan Sayed as Rajni.
- Manoj Ramola as Hari
- Phalguni Desai as Manorma Narayan, Hari Narayan's Sister.
- Unknown person as Sona (Sheel House's servant).
- Farzil Pardiwala as Devrishi Naarad.
- Unknown person as Kutilaa.
- Suman Dey.
