= Kanika Mann =

Indian actress (born 1993)

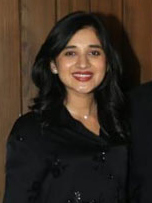
- Mann in January 2023
- Born: 7 October 1993 (age 33); Panipat, Haryana, India
- Education: Panjab University, Chandigarh
- Occupations: Actress; Model
- Years active: 2016–present
- Known for: Guddan Tumse Na Ho Payega; Khatron Ke Khiladi 12; Naagin 7 Bigg Boss season 20

Kanika Mann (born 7 October 1993) is an Indian actress who primarily works in Hindi television. She is best known for her role in Guddan Tumse Na Ho Payega. She made her television debut in Badho Bahu. Mann made her web debut with Roohaniyat. In 2022, she participated in Khatron Ke Khiladi 12. In 2026, she joined Naagin 7. In the Same Year, she joined the Hindi Language Reality Show Bigg Boss 20 and currently she is inside the house.

== Early life ==
Mann was born on 7 October 1993 in Panipat, Haryana. She completed her graduation from Panjab University, Chandigarh.

== Career ==
Mann started her career as a model and later appeared in various Punjabi music videos. She made her acting debut in 2017 with the Punjabi film Rocky Mental portraying Seerat opposite Dheeraj Kumar. The film received positive reviews.

In 2018, she made her Kannada film debut with Brihaspathi. The film received mixed reviews. She then appeared in the Punjabi film Daana Paani, portraying Maghi. Mann made her television debut in 2018 with Badho Bahu, where she portrayed Titli opposite Prince Narula.

From 2018 to 2020, Mann portrayed Guddan Gupta Jindal in Guddan Tumse Na Ho Payega opposite Nishant Singh Malkani, which proved as a major turning point in her career. She portrayed her character's on-screen daughter Guddan Jindal Birla opposite Savi Thakur from 2020 to 2021.

In 2021, she appeared in the Punjabi film Amrika My Dream opposite Amandep Multani and Sapinder Shergill.

Mann made her web debut in March 2022, with MX Player's Roohaniyat opposite Arjun Bijlani portraying Prisha Srivastava. She also portrayed Manpreet/ Miss Maahi in the 2022 Punjabi film Majajan Orchestra.

In July 2022, she was seen as a finalist on Khatron Ke Khiladi 12. In July 2022, she also reprised her role of Prisha Srivastava in the second season of Roohaniyat opposite Arjun Bijlani.

In February 2026, she joined Naagin (2015 TV series) as Radhika portraying as a powerful Dragon. Alongside Priyanka Chahar Choudhary and Namik Paul. The show Concluded on 14th June 2026.

Currently, she is seen in the twentieth season Hindi Language Reality Show Bigg Boss.

== Filmography ==
=== Film ===
Year	Title	Role	Language	Notes	Ref.
2025	Pind Peya Saara Jombieland Baneya	Koko	Punjabi	Debut film	

=== Television ===
Year	Title	Role	Notes	Ref.
2018	Badho Bahu	Titli	Cameo appearance	
2018–2021	Guddan Tumse Na Ho Payega	Guddan Gupta Jindal		
2022	Fear Factor: Khatron Ke Khiladi 12	Contestant	6th place	
2023–2024	Chand Jalne Laga	Tara Sehgal		
2026	Naagin 7	Radhika		
2026–present	Bigg Boss 20	Contestant		

=== Web series ===
Year	Title	Role	Language	Network	Ref.
2022	Roohaniyat	Prisha Srivastava	Hindi	MX Player	
2023	Rakshak India's Braves	Mala	Hindi	Amazon miniTV	
2024	Flight Attendant	Kinisha Dandekar/Shakti Tyagi	Hindi	HungamaOTT	
2026	Super Subbu	Alekhya	Telugu	Netflix	

=== Music videos ===
Year	Title	Singer(s)	Ref.
2016	Naina Di Gal	Vishal	
2017	Dooriyan	Guri, Tanya	
2017	Viah	Maninder Buttar	
2018	Tere Vicho	Parmish Verma	
2018	Mere Saaiyan	Shahid Mallya	
2018	Kathputli	Hashmat, Sultana	
2019	Wajood	Shahid Mallya	
2019	Tu Dil Mera	Manjit Sahota	
2020	Ik Munda	Amar Sandhu	
2020	Dil Kahe	Yasser Desai	
2020	Kalma	Prateek Gandhi	
2020	Khoobsurat Jatti	Sunny Kahlon	
2021	Ishq Tumpe Aise	Samira Koppikar	
2021	SHE	Kaka	
2021	Jhoome	Rahi Sayyed	
2021	Sachiyaan Mohabattan	Youngveer, Divya Bhatt	
2022	Izhaar	Gurnazar	
2022	Dil Kive Karda	Miel	
2022	Mehendi Sade Naam Di	Raghav Sachar	
2022	Sorry Sorry	Ramji Gulati	
2024	Dua Kijiye	Sameer Khan	

== Awards ==
Year	Award	Category	Work	Result	Ref.
2020	Gold Glam and Style Awards	Stylish Star TV (Female)	—N/a	Won	
