= Phir Laut Aayi Naagin =

Indian Hindi-language supernatural fiction series

- Genre: Supernatural
- Starring: Nikita Sharma; Jatin Bharadwaj; Abhimanyu Chaudhary; Ankit Arora
- Country of origin: India
- Original language: Hindi
- No. of seasons: 2
- No. of episodes: 100

Production
- Editor: Santosh Singh
- Running time: 25 minutes
- Production company: Triangle Film Company

Original release
- Network: Dangal TV
- Release: 2 September 2019 – 17 January 2020

Phir Laut Aayi Naagin (transl. Female Shape Shifting Serpent has returned) is a Hindi-language Indian television supernatural drama series produced by Triangle Film Corporation. It stars Nikita Sharma, Jatin Bharadwaj, and Abhimanyu Chaudhary. It aired from 2 September 2019 to 17 January 2020 on Dangal TV.

== Plot ==
Shivani is a naagin (shape-shifting serpent) who has returned after twelve years to find her love to the city in Anand's house whose is a joint family. Her guru told that her Nagaraj, who was killed for Naagmani, made his rebirth in Anand's house. So Shivani in the form of a twelve-year-old girl went there to find her nagraj. There she finds that the two boys, Raj and Rohit, were born on the same day, confusing her. So she appeals to her guru who says that she only can identify her nagraj. So she remembers that nagraj had told her about the star symbol on his mole which will be on him even he take 100 births. So with the help of this, she tries to find him but repeatedly fails. Meanwhile, Anand found that a serpent in the form of a small girl is around his house with the help of a sage. Anand is the one with the help of his friends, and his driver Lakshman, killed Nagraj for the nagmani. Then he realised that the naagin has come to kill him. When Shivani found that Raj is her Nagraj by seeing the star symbol on his arm, she was captured by the sage and is kept in the cremated box under a tree for nine years.

After nine years, Anand with the power of naagmani became one of the wealthiest people in the world. He announces that his son Rohit would take his new project at the press meet. Returning from the land, Rohit and raj is returning to their house. Shivani sets out find who is Raj as she knows he is her Nagraj. Shivani then disguises as Nandini, and comes with the help of a naagin, Priya and a naag as the daughter of a wealthy person and buys a mansion near Raj's house. Rohit sees her and falls in love with her. Raj also likes her the moment he sees her but for Rohit's sake, he hides the love. Rohit sends Raj to see Nandini and tell him Rohit's love but repeatedly fails. Then Anand knowing that Nandini is the daughter of a wealthy person, makes friends with her. Meanwhile, one of Rohit's friend falls for Nandini and tries to abuse her but Raj saves. In this incident, Raj gets shot by a gun. Nandini gets to know Raj. She tries to make him remember his past life but cannot. Meanwhile, another naagin, Ragini who loved nagraj comes there. She tries to kill Nandini so that she can marry Raj. Rohit tries to abuse Nandini many times. At last, he dies by falling from a cliff while fighting with Raj for Nandini. Anand decides to take revenge on Nandini and Raj because they were the reason for Rohit's death. Raj and Ragini's marriage is fixed but fails. Raj finds out that he is a shape-shifting serpent but is unable to control himself. So he takes help from a sage and is able to control and change forms. But he remembers nothing. It is revealed that Ragini was the one who led Anand and his friends to nagmani to kill Shivani but Anand kills the Nagraj instead. Raj's and Nandini's marriage is fixed but failed. Raj gets to know that Nandini is a naagin who was killing Anand's friends. Ragini tells Anand that Nandini is the Naagin so he tells Raj to kill Nandini so that Anand can kill Raj after that. Raj reaches the temple where Nandini was. He took the gun for killing her but could not because he remembers everything. Lakshman reveals to Raj that when Anand killed nagraj, a light came out from his chest and came into Lakshman's chest. When the child of Lakshman was born, it actually died, but then the light from his chest went into the baby's chest and so he would be the Nagraj. So Raj and Nandini went to kill Anand but finds out that Anand had become a shape shifting snake with the power of nagmani. They kill Anand and the nagmani gets back to its real owner, the Nagraj. Finally Raj and Shivani unite.

== Cast ==
=== Main ===
- Nikita Sharma as Shivani/Nandini: a shape-shifting serpent Nagarjun/Raj's wife; Queen Of Naagalok (Naagrani), Rohit's love interest
- Jatin Bharadwaj/Ankit Arora:
  - Raj Lakshman: Nagraj's reincarnated life; son of Lakshman and Meena; adoptive son of Anand and Priya: Naina's brother and Rohit's adoptive brother; Shivani's husband; Ragini's love interest
  - Nagraj Naagarjun; King of Naaglok; husband of Shivani; Raj's previous birth
- Abhimanyu Chaudhary as Rohit: son of Anand and Priya; adoptive son of Lakshman and Meena; Raj and Naina's adoptive brother; Shivani's ex-fiancé
- Manish Khanna as Anand Thakur: Rohit and Reena's father; Raj's adoptive father; he killed Nagraj to acquire Naagmani.
- Sonia Singh as Ragini: an Evil Naagin Shivani’s enemy/friend
- Pratima Kazmi as Mohini/Sapera(female Snake charmer): Anand's elder sister; enemy of Shivani
- Deepshikha Nagpal as Kanchan: an Evil Naagin Ragini's mother

=== Recurring ===
- Kashvi Kothari as small Shivani
- Manu Malik as Lakshman: Raj's father, Anand's driver and friend
- Amrita Tanganiya as Priya: Shivani's friend
- Richa Pradhan as Poonam: Raj's younger sister
- Bindiya Kalra as Naina: Anand's sister
- Tanu Vidyarthi as Meena: Raj's mother
- Pyumori Mehta Ghosh as Neelam: Raj and Poonam's mother
- Ayaan Zubair Rahmani as small Raj
- Heer Morabia as small Rohit
- Lakshya Handa as Bobby
- Pooran Kiri as Vikas
- Devaksh Rai as Mohit
