= Himani Chawla =

Indian television actress

Hemani Chawla
- Born: 14 august Delhi, India
- Occupation: Actress
- Years active: 2008–present
- Known for: Zindagi Badal Sakta Hai Hadsaa, Gunwale Dulhania Le Jayenge, Mata Ki Chowki, Hi! Padosi... Kaun Hai Doshi?
- Height: 5 ft 7 in (170 cm)

Hemani Chawla is an Indian television actress, who made her television debut with Zindagi Badal Sakta Hai Hadsaa in 2008. Moreover, she has also worked in Gunwale Dulhania Le Jayenge, Mata Ki Chowki and Hi! Padosi... Kaun Hai Doshi?. She has also appeared in an episodic of Fear Files: Darr Ki Sacchi Tasvirein and Aahat (season 6).

In 2008, Hemani has done Hindi comedy film, Money Hai Toh Honey Hai.

== Television ==
- Zee TV's Zindagi Badal Sakta Hai Hadsaa and Fear Files: Darr Ki Sacchi Tasvirein
- SAB TV's Gunwale Dulhania Le Jayenge
- Sahara One's Mata Ki Chowki and Hi! Padosi... Kaun Hai Doshi?
- Sony TV's Aahat (season 6)
- Dabangii – Mulgii Aayi Re Aayi
