= Pathayeram Kodi =

2013 Indian film by Muktha S. Sundar

- Theatrical release poster
- Directed by: Muktha S. Sundar
- Written by: Muktha S. Sundar
- Produced by: Vishwanathan; Muktha Srinivasan
- Starring: Dhruv Bhandari; Madalsa Sharma; Vivek; Gokulnath; Kanishka Soni
- Cinematography: Rajkumar
- Edited by: Suchit Kumar
- Music by: K. S. Manoj; G. D. Prasad; Nirojan
- Production company: Maayaa Creation
- Release date: 25 January 2013
- Country: India
- Language: Tamil

Pathayeram Kodi (transl. Ten Thousand Crores) is a 2013 Tamil-language science fiction comedy film written and directed by Muktha S. Sundar. The film stars Dhruv Bhandari, Madalsa Sharma, Vivek, Gokulnath and Kanishka Soni. The film was released on 25 January 2013. It was dubbed and released in Hindi as Paisa Ho Paisa in April 2015. The film was not commercially successful.

== Plot ==
A group of college students invent a chemical potion that makes them invisible. They use this invention to steal ₹10,000 crore (equivalent to ₹170 billion or US$1.8 billion in 2023) from Karishma, who has an abundance of illegal wealth. Shankar Lal, a CB-CID officer, must trace the money from the students, who are on the run.

== Cast ==
- Dhruv Bhandari as Ashwin
- Madalsa Sharma as Bhoomika
- Vivek as Shankar Lal
- Gokulnath as Gokul
- Kanishka Soni as Karishma
- Cell Murugan as Shankar Lal's assistant
- Halwa Vasu as Shankar Lal's assistant
- Chelladurai as Chelladurai
- Nellai Siva
- Natesh as 'Natu' Natraj
- Thyagu as Professor
- Madhan Bob as Police Officer
- Siva Narayana Murthy as Shankar Lal's assistant
- Antony as Ashwin and Bhoomika’s friend

== Soundtrack ==
The songs are composed by K. S. Manoj and G. D. Prasad.

Track listing
No.	Title	Lyrics	Singer(s)	Length
1.	"Ithu Enna Mayamo"	Nishanth	Vinay, Raina
2.	"Bhumika"	Nishanth	Haricharan
3.	"Azhagana Poigal"	Nishanth	Prasanna, Harini
4.	"Padikka Padikka"	Sivakasi Sridar	Vinay, Barath, M.J. Deekshith
5.	"C.B.I. Singam"	Sivakasi Sridar	Sunanthitha, Kalyan
6.	"Pathayeram Kodi"	Sivakasi Sridar	Nathamuni Gayathri

== Reception ==
Sidharth Varma of The Times of India wrote, "The movie tries to cash in on the idiocy of the CB-CID officers, which at most times is far fetched. But it will definitely get the frontbenchers roaring in laughter thanks to the antics of Vivek and his men". He appreciated Rajkumar's cinematography but criticised "the lack of consistency in the plot and screenplay".

The film was reported to be remade as Paisa Ho Paisa. However, the film was simply re-edited and dubbed in Hindi due to the presence of Hindi actors. A critic from The Times of India wrote that "The film is no Mr. India. Nor is it a sci-fi. It's a badly made dramedy, which makes you want to magically disappear from the movie hall. Spray that thing on us, I say! A critic from Mumbai Mirror wrote that "Throughout this ‘remake’, I hoped against hope for the screening to be interrupted by a giant April Fools banner. But nothing happened. The joke is still on us".
