= Gurpreet Bedi =

Indian actress

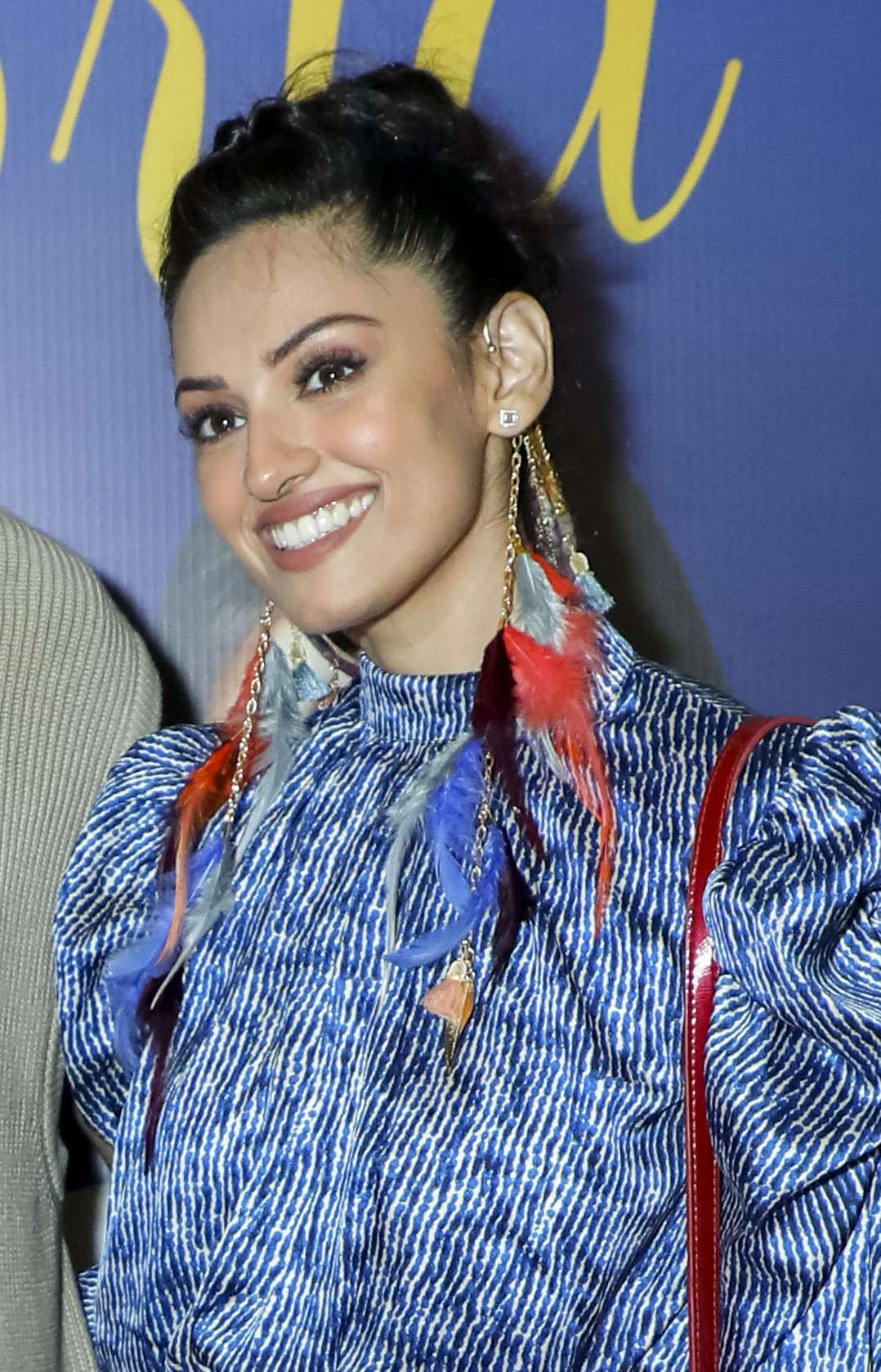
- Gurpreet Bedi at an event in 2023
- Born: New Delhi
- Occupations: Actress; model
- Years active: 2010–present
- Spouse: Kapil Arya (m. 2021)
- Awards: Himalayan Femina Miss Natural Beauty

Gurpreet Bedi is an Indian actress and model. She was in the top 10 finalists in Pantaloons Femina Miss India 2010 and was crowned the Himalayan Femina Miss Natural Beauty. She is best known for her character Reeva in Sony Television's Dil Hi Toh Hai.

== Early life ==
Gurpreet was born in New Delhi. Shortly after finishing her graduation in graphic designing from University of Bedfordshire, she returned to India. She is currently residing in Mumbai.

== Personal life ==
Gurpreet is married to fellow actor Kapil Arya. She has an elder sister named Supreet Bedi, who is also an actress and tv presenter.

== Career ==
=== Modelling career ===
Gurpreet started her modelling career by contesting in Pantaloons Femina Miss India and was one of the top 10 finalists. She continued to appear in various print and online advertisements, TV commercials for brands like Hyundai i20, Whisper, Sunsilk, Garnier, Loreal and many more. She has shot for various magazines like Grazia, Femina, Raymonds and many more. She also hosted the Hockey India League.

=== Film debut ===
In the year 2015, she made her acting debut in Life Ok's Laut Aao Trisha playing the character Suhana (VK's Boss). This was followed by her role in SuperCops vs Supervillains where she played multiple episodes in different characters such as Damyanti (Aghor's Mistress) / Rani Zaffara / SuperCop Hetonwita.

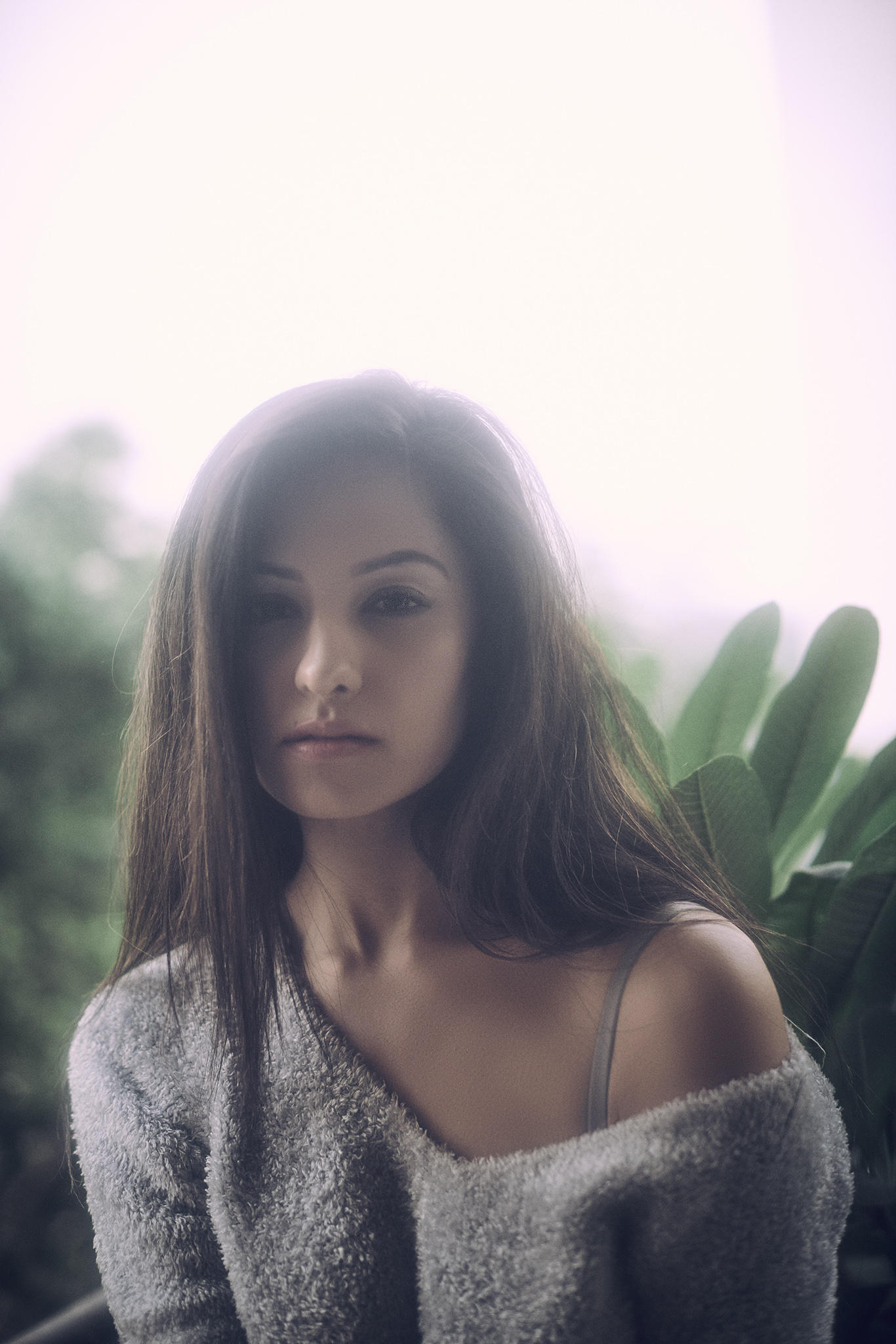
Gurpreet Bedi in 2018

From 2018 onwards, she played the character of Reeva Noon in the web series Dil Hi Toh Hai, produced by Ekta Kapoor and originally airing on Sony Entertainment Television.

In 2021, she played the character of Monisha in Bang Baang produced by Ekta Kapoor. This was followed by her role as Sana Shaikh in ZEE5's Qubool Hai 2.0 co-starring Karan Singh Grover & Surbhi Jyoti.

In 2022, She played Character of Maya in Kathmandu Connection 2. From 2022 to 2023, she played Keerti Sachdev in Pyar Ke Saat Vachan Dharampatnii.

=== Music video ===
She played the character Mitali in a musical web series project The Socho Project.

== Filmography ==
=== Television ===
Year	Show	Role	Ref.
2015	Laut Aao Trisha	Advocate Suhana	
2015, 2016	SuperCops vs Supervillains	Damyanti (Aghor's Mistress) / Rani Zaffara / SuperCop Hetonwita	
2017–2018	Paramavatar Shri Krishna	Kesani	
2022–2023	Pyar Ke Saat Vachan Dharampatnii	Keerti Sachdev	
2024	Shrimad Ramayan	Mandodari	

=== Web series ===
Year	Show	Role	References
2022	Raktanchal (Season 2)	Fazila Khan	
2022	Country Mafia	Usha	
2022	Kathmandu Connection 2	Maya	
2021	Qubool Hai 2.0	Sana	
2021	Bang Baang	Monisha	
2018–2020	Dil Hi Toh Hai	Reeva Noon	

=== Music videos ===
Year	Name	Role	References
2020	The Socho Project	Mitali	
