= Nalini Negi =

Indian actress (born 1997)

- Born: 14 August 1992 (age 34); New Delhi, India
- Education: Bachelor in journalism(b.j)
- Occupations: Actress and model
- Years active: 2009-Present

Nalini Negi (born 14 August 1997) is an Indian television actress and model best known for her role as Trisha Swaika in Laut Aao Trisha.

== Early life and education ==
She was born in Delhi, but her native place is Himachal Pradesh. She did her schooling from Lady Irwin School and went on to obtain a bachelor's degree from Vivekananda Institute of Professional Studies in Guru Gobind Singh Indraprastha University in 2012.

== Television ==
Year	Show	Role	Notes
2009	MTV Splitsvilla	Herself / Contestant	
2014–2015	Laut Aao Trisha	Trisha Swaika	
2014–2015	Box Cricket League 1	Contestant	
2015	Doli Armaano Ki	Ishaani	
2015	Diya Aur Baati Hum	Piya	
2016–2017	Naamkaran	Riya Mehta	
2016	Darr Sabko Lagta Hai	Karishma	
2017	Porus	Vishkanya	
2018	Laal Ishq	Rukhsar	
	Bhagya	Leana Dhewan	
2019	Laal Ishq	Nandini	
2019	Vish	Catrina	
2023	Tere Ishq Mein Ghayal	Cherry Dhawan	
