= Roohaniyat =

Web series

- Genre: Drama; Family; Mystery; Romance; Crime
- Based on: Forever Series by Novoneel Chakraborty
- Screenplay by: Sushil Choubey; Shilpa Choubey; Shreyes Anil Lowlekar
- Story by: Sushil Choubey; Shilpa Choubey
- Directed by: Glen Barretto; Ankush Mohla
- Starring: Arjun Bijlani; Kanika Mann
- Music by: Rishabh Srivastava; Paresh Shah; SCAR
- Country of origin: India
- Original language: Hindi
- No. of seasons: 2
- No. of episodes: 40

Production
- Producers: Abhishek Rege; Gaurav Gokhale; Mitul Mody; Anaya Mohanty; Harish Shah
- Production location: India
- Cinematography: Ramani Ranjan Das
- Editor: Steven Bernard
- Camera setup: Multi-camera
- Production company: Endemol Shine India

Original release
- Network: MX Player
- Release: 23 March – 2 September 2022

Roohaniyat (transl. Spirituality) is an Indian, Hindi-Language streaming television series, directed by Glen Barretto and Ankush Mohla for MX Player Originals. The series stars Arjun Bijlani and Kanika Mann in key roles alongside Smita Bansal and Aman Yatan Verma with Yuvika Chaudhary in a special appearance. It is based on the Forever Series by Novoneel Chakraborty with new characters and additional storyline written by Shilpa Choubey and Sushil Choubey .

On 23 March 2022 the first chapter was released on MX Player including 13 episodes. It became the first long format series to be released on any OTT platform. The first chapter received positive reviews from critics. The second chapter was set to release on 21 April in the same year but got delayed and was postponed to 22 July 2022. The trailer for the second chapter released on 14 July 2022. The second chapter was released on 22 July 2022 by a 3 episodic release window which opened every Friday, 11 AM IST. With the release of the second chapter, Roohaniyat made it to COTT's Top 10 OTT shows of 2022 with a total of 25.95 million views, positioned at the 9th spot.

The web series was shot in various locations in Pune, Mumbai, Mahabaleshwar, Panchgani and Lonavala.

The songs in the web series were composed by Rishabh Srivastava for chapter 1, while Paresh Shah and SCAR composed songs for chapter 2. Rishabh Srivastava also provided the score for chapter 1 and chapter 2. Paresh Shah Studios contributed in score for chapter 2 only. The songs in the first chapter were released officially on 26 August 2022, including the tracks 1 to 7.

== Summary ==
The series follows the story of Saveer Rathod, a man who has faced certain situations in his life that have led him to believe that love does not last forever, and Prisha Srivastava, a teen who strongly believes in love. The two are complete strangers to each other, only till they are met again and again by coincidence or destiny, as Saveer believes it. Prisha somehow ends up playing a crucial role in Saveer's life and discovers something terrible about him that changes her life in a way she never could have expected.

== Cast ==
=== Main ===
- Arjun Bijlani as Saveer Rathod, CEO of Rooh Publications; Prisha's boyfriend; Ishanvi's ex-boyfriend
- Kanika Mann as Prisha Srivastava, an aspiring author; intern at Rooh Publications; Saveer's girlfriend

=== Recurring ===
- Yuvika Chaudhary as Ishanvi Purohit – Saveer's ex-fiancée
- Aman Yatan Verma as Ashok Srivastava – Prisha's father
- Smita Bansal as Priya Srivastava – Prisha's mother
- Palak Purswani as Anita Malkani (Anu) – Saveer's friend
- Geetika Mehandru as Gouri Singh – Prisha's best friend
- Harshit Sindhwani as Digambar Ahuja (Diggy) – Prisha's friend
- Arushi Handa as Pratha Srivastava (Shelly) – Prisha's sister
- Shaan R. Grover as Rishi Kulkarni – Prisha's ex-boyfriend
- Smitika Acharya as Neha Shinde (Sweety) – Ashok's extramarital affair
- Shikha Dogra as Mrudula Deshpande – Saveer's therapist
- Anuj Khurana as Sanjeev Kamath – Professor at Pune City College; Gouri's boyfriend
- Karan Verma as Krishna Reddy – Saveer's personal assistant
- Neetu Upadhyay as Shagufta Ali – Worker at Rooh Publications
- Arjun Singh Shekhawat as Aarav Saxena – Editor at Rooh Publications
- Aishu Deora as Priyata Thomas – Worker at Rooh Publications
- Karanbir Arora as Jaggi Singh – Worker at Rooh Publications
- Priya Parmar as Mrinal Gore – Worker at Rooh Publications
- Prakhar Mishra as Prakhar Mishra – Worker at Rooh Publications
- Namrata Joshi as Kamla Rathod – Saveer's grandmother
- Arun Malik as Lt. Colonel Malkani – Anu's Father
- Bushra Shaikh as Zenia Shaikh – Saveer's date; Prisha's friend
- Priya Shukla as Bijal – Saveer's date
- Ravi Kumawat as Naveen – Prisha's date
- Rachel White as Megha – Model
- Ujjwal Gauraha as John – Photographer
- Manoj Chandila as Aneesh Rebeiro – Inspector; Saveer's friend
- Prajakta Parab as Patricia Rebeiro (Patty) – Aneesh's wife
- Sameer Khandekar as Prakash Muqaddam – Constable
- Saniya Dhawan as Nushrat – Prisha's doctor

== Overview ==
Series overview
Series	Episodes	Originally released	
Series	Episodes	First released	Last released
Chapter 1	13	23 March 2022	23 March 2022
Chapter 2	27	22 July 2022	2 September 2022

== Episodes ==
Chapter 1

Episode No.	Title	Originally Aired	Plot
1	"Forever Is A Lie"	March 23, 2022	Saveer prepares for a dinner date with Ishanvi. He leaves after a fight over a phone call. Next morning, he wakes up to find that Ishanvi has been murdered. Six months later, Saveer is released from imprisonment. Anu advices him to move on from his grief of losing Ishanvi. One night, Saveer is on a date where he meets Prisha. He tells her that whatever had happened to her is because forever is a lie.
2	"Middle Finger"	March 23, 2022	Prisha meets Gouri and Diggy for the first time. They plan a visit to Mahabaleshwar where Prisha meets Saveer again. She shows her disapproval to him, of what he had told her the last time.
3	"Blind Date"	March 23, 2022	Prisha's friends set up a blind date for her. At the nightclub, Prisha meets Saveer again. As she confronts him, Saveer realizes that Prisha is drunk and alone. He gets a cab for her to go home. As she reaches outside Gouri and Diggy's place, three of them are attacked by two men. Saveer saves Prisha.
4	"Thank You"	March 23, 2022	At a hospital, Prisha gets informed that someone with the name 'Saveer Rathod' had saved her. She gets his office address to thank him. Later that night, both of them meet again, this time at a restaurant.
5	"Suicide Attempt"	March 23, 2022	Saveer finds a pen drive with a video of him trying to attempt suicide. At night, Saveer is surprised to see Prisha as his date.
6	"Unconditional Love"	March 23, 2022	Prisha tells Saveer how she had created a fake profile for the date. The next day, Prisha is selected for internship, along with her friends. She is at the office for the final interview where she gets humiliated by Saveer.
7	"Destiny"	March 23, 2022	Saveer is thinking about Ishanvi. He's reminded of her telling him about how destiny brings people together. The next day, Saveer and Prisha meet again outside the office.
8	"Dream"	March 23, 2022	Saveer and Prisha decide to ignore each other. Later that night, Saveer discusses with his therapist about how he keeps seeing Ishanvi. Prisha ends up dreaming about Saveer.
9	"Roohaniyat"	March 23, 2022	Prisha accidentally drops coffee on Saveer. She decides to apologize to him. She also tells him about a suggestion that she has for the podcast. Later, Prisha mails her voice recording to Saveer.
10	"New Beginnings"	March 23, 2022	Prisha waits for Saveer to tell her if he has approved her work. The next day, in Mahabaleshwar, Prisha notices Saveer has stopped ignoring her.
11	"Girlfriend Killer"	March 23, 2022	Prisha is selected as the voice for the podcast. At night, Prisha gets drunk and confronts Saveer. Saveer warns her to stay away from him as he reveals to her about his girlfriend's murder.
12	"Who The Hell Is Prisha?"	March 23, 2022	Saveer realizes that it wasn't Prisha who was with him the previous night. Prisha gets drunk and falls into a pool.
13	"Departure"	March 23, 2022	Saveer saves Prisha from drowning. The following day, Prisha tries to thank him for saving her life whereas Saveer ignores her. Prisha tells him that she will make sure that her message reaches him.

Chapter 2

Episode No.	Title	Originally Aired	Plot
1	"Thank You"	July 22, 2022	Saveer finds out that Prisha has delivered her message to him through the 'Roohaniyat' podcast. But even after Prisha's confession of her love for him, Saveer continues to deny the truth.
2	"I Am In Love"	July 22, 2022	Saveer keeps daydreaming about Prisha but does not admit what the truth is. Prisha catches Saveer smiling while listening to her podcast.
3	"She Has A Crush On You"	July 22, 2022	Prisha and her friends get in trouble after getting drunk in a nightclub. She calls Saveer, asking him to save them. He drives them to their place. Gouri advises him to stop ignoring Prisha.
4	"Laghbagh"	July 29, 2022	Saveer calls her at Ishanvi Cafe and apologizes to her. Prisha is surprised by Saveer's unexpected behaviour.
5	"Kaash Aur Laghbahg"	July 29, 2022	Prisha worries if she will ever be able to take Ishanvi's place in Saveer's life. Later that day, after the photoshoot ends, Prisha and Saveer have a conversation.
6	"First Kiss"	July 29, 2022	Saveer calls Prisha and picks her up for a date. He advises her not to expect much from their relationship.
7	"He Is Chasing Me"	August 5, 2022	Saveer waits for Prisha at the office. Later, he decides to go and see Prisha at her college. The following day, Saveer takes Prisha to his house.
8	"We Are A Couple"	August 5, 2022	Saveer and Prisha have an argument . Prisha's family surprises her on her birthday. She hopes for Saveer to wish her. Saveer disappears.
9	"Happy Birthday Prisha Srivastava"	August 5, 2022	Gouri and Diggy take Prisha to Mahabaleshwar. Saveer surprises Prisha. She notices a fire at the location.
10	"Adhuri Kiss"	August 12, 2022	Saveer is ignoring Prisha's calls again. Prisha doubts that Anu is behind all the mishappenings. She finally meets Saveer at the college.
11	"Fur Wala Stole"	August 12, 2022	Saveer discovers another video in his phone. Later, at the office, Saveer has a panic attack. At night, Prisha gets a message from Saveer who invites her for dinner. At Saveer's house, Prisha is blindfolded and almost choked to death.
12	"Self Isolation"	August 12, 2022	Prisha questions Saveer about the previous night. Saveer asks Prisha to leave and not to contact him. Later that night, Saveer's therapist advises him to isolate himself.
13	"Dil Pe Tattoo"	August 19, 2022	Prisha asks Saveer for answers. At the office, she conveys her message to him through the podcast. On the night before his birthday, Saveer gets Prisha's name tattooed.
14	"Forever Is A Lie"	August 19, 2022	Saveer finds a knife at his doorstep. Later, he receives a message from Prisha to meet him in Mahabaleshwar. As Prisha waits for Saveer, she is pushed down a cliff.
15	"Life And Death"	August 27, 2022	Saveer finds out about Prisha's accident. Later, Saveer gets injured in a car crash.
16	"Back Off Prisha... Back Off..."	August 27, 2022	Saveer fails to recall how he got saved after the car accident. Prisha is visited by Saveer at the hospital.
17	"Not Again Saveer"	August 27, 2022	Saveer confesses to the police about pushing Prisha down the cliff. Prisha gains consciousness.
18	"Saveer Gayab Hai"	August 27, 2022	Saveer visits Prisha at the hospital. After a few days, Prisha is home. She talks to Gouri and Diggy about Saveer visiting her at the hospital twice. There is a sudden fire at Saveer's house.
19	"Warning"	August 27, 2022	Saveer talks to Aneesh about how he is sure he's not the reason behind all the deaths. Prisha asks Anu for Saveer's location. Prisha finds a way to talk to Saveer.
20	"Rooh Se Rooh Tak"	August 27, 2022	Prisha talks to Saveer through the podcast. The following day, Prisha and her friends chase Anu. Prisha takes it as challenge to find Saveer in the next 24 hours.
21	"24 Ghante Ka Challenge"	August 27, 2022	Saveer's grandmother is missing. Prisha breaks into Saveer's house. Later that night, Prisha and Shelly catch their parents arguing.
22	"Yehi Sach Hai"	August 27, 2022	The search for Saveer's grandmother begins. Saveer finds a video of him burying Brownie. Saveer, along with the police, succeeds in finding his grandmother.
23	"The Proof"	September 2, 2022	Anu reveals Saveer's location to Prisha. Prisha tells Saveer that she is certain about him not being the person who pushed her down the cliff. Aneesh is hit by Saveer's car.
24	"Khulasa"	September 2, 2022	Prisha and Saveer visit Aneesh, who is injured from the car accident. Later, Prisha and Saveer decide to set up security cameras in his house. Anu is murdered.
25	"Tit For Tat"	September 2, 2022	The search for the murderer continues. A mysterious woman is discovered in Saveer's house. Saveer finds out about Anu's death. Later, he receives a sign about the murderer from his grandmother.
26	"Gifty"	September 2, 2022	Aneesh receives a threat from the murderer. Saveer visits his childhood home. He discovers having a twin brother at a hospital. Diggy is killed by the mysterious woman.
27	"Forever Is True"	September 2, 2022	Prisha is kidnapped. Saveer's twin brother reveals the truth to her. Saveer saves Prisha.

== Soundtracks ==
Original sound tracks
No.	Title	Writer(s)	Singer(s)	Length
1.	"Roohaniyat"	Syed Amir Hussain	Rishabh Srivastava	5:11
2.	"Humqadam"	Syed Amir Hussain	Ananya Nanda & Rishabh Srivastava	4:44
3.	"Yaad Aaye Wo"	Syed Amir Hussain	Mohammed Irfan	5:12
4.	"Chhutti"	Syed Amir Hussain	Pratikhya Sarma & Rishabh Srivastava	4:01
5.	"Roohaniyat 2.0"	Syed Amir Hussain	Arjun Kanungo	3:16
6.	"Roohaniyat 2.0" (Female Vocals)	Syed Amir Hussain	Simran Choudhary	3:30
7.	"Roohaniyat" (Female Vocals)	Syed Amir Hussain	Jyotica Tangri	3:33
8.	"Precious Pearl" (Duet)	SCAR	Nikenna Barretto & SCAR	3:10
9.	"Precious Pearl" (Male Vocals)	SCAR	SCAR	3:09
10.	"Precious Pearl" (Female Vocals)	SCAR	Nikenna Barretto	3:09
11.	"Roohaniyat Forever"	Shree D, Paresh Shah	Shree D	2:44
