= Manoj Chandila =

Indian television actor and model

- Born: 15 December; Delhi, India
- Occupations: Actor, Model
- Years active: 2007 – present
- Known for: Laut Aao Trisha; Ye Hai Mohabbatein; Bepanah Pyaar

Manoj Chandila is an Indian actor and model. He is known for the role of Dr. Manoj Paul on Star Plus TV show Ye Hai Mohabbatein.

== Career ==
He has done many roles in various Hindi television shows like Kis Desh Mein Hai Meraa Dil, Matti Ki Banno, Mrs. Kaushik Ki Paanch Bahuein and Aahat (season 6). In 2022, he appeared in MX Player's web series Roohaniyat.

== Television ==
Year	Serial	Role	Notes
2009–2010	Kis Desh Mein Hai Meraa Dil	Harman Juneja	
2014	Saath Nibhaana Saathiya	Anurag "Masterji" Joshi	
2015	Dil Dostii Dance	Dr. Raj Malhotra	
2015	Adhikaar ek kasam ek tapasya		
2015	Yeh Hai Mohabbatein	Dr. Manoj Paul	
	Matti Ki Banno	Vikram Singh / Arjun	
	Code Red		
	Yeh Hai Aashiqui		
	Mrs. Kaushik Ki Paanch Bahuein	Shivendu Kaushik	
	2613		
	Ek Boond Ishq		
	Laut Aao Trisha		
	Desh Ki Beti Nandini	Abhay Singh	
2015	Aahat		
2016	C.I.D.	Dr. Arjun	
2016	Sarojini - Ek Nayi Pehal	Komal Singh	
2016	Swaragini	Chiraag Bhandari	
2018	Dil Hi Toh Hai	Kabir	
2018	Kaun Hai?	Suraj	
2018	Laal Ishq	Ali Khan / Dr. Rahul	
2019	Bepanah Pyaar	Harshit Malhotra	
2020	Maddam Sir	Ajay Kumar / Manav	
2021	Teri Meri Ikk Jindri	Pratap Saigal "Pappuji"	
2022	Fanaa: Ishq Mein Marjawan	Inspector Ranjit Singh	
2022	Roohaniyat	Aneesh Rebeiro	
2022–2023	Katha Ankahee	Anirudh Verma	
2023–2024	Ikk Kudi Punjab Di	Jarnail Singh Atwal	
2024	Teri Meri Doriyaann	Zorawar Maan	
2025	Noyontara	Ajay Ghosh	
2025	Binddii	Sharad	
2026	Oh Humnava Tum Dena Saath Mera	Lalit Shrimali	

=== Films ===
Year	Film	Role	Language	Notes
2008	Sunday	Sanjay	Hindi	
2015	Gabbar is Back	Vikas Patil	Hindi	
