= Adita Wahi =

Indian television actress

- Born: New Delhi, India
- Occupations: Actress, model, anchor
- Years active: 2004–2015
- Known for: Laut Aao Trisha as Sonali Swaika
- Spouses: Ameet Sawant (Divorced); Vishal Singh

Adita Wahi is an Indian television actress, model and anchor. She is best known for her roles as Sonali Swaika in the TV show, Laut Aao Trisha (2014) and as Shefali Goenka in Saarrthi (2007). Adita was a finalist in the Femina Miss India beauty pageant.

== Early life ==
Adita was born in New Delhi, India. She completed her schooling at Convent of Jesus and Mary, Delhi. She took up a summer internship at Weekenders - a popular clothing retailer. Within a few years, Adita was merchandising for one of the largest clothing exporters in Delhi. Subsequently, Adita moved to New York City to pursue a specialized program in merchandising at the Fashion Institute of Technology. While in New York she fell in love with theater and acting and eventually decided to focus her time and energy pursuing her love of acting. She attended the Lee Strasberg Theatre and Film Institute in New York.

== Television ==
Year:	Serial:	Role:	Channel:
2014 - 2015	Laut Aao Trisha	Sonali Gaurav Swaika	Life OK
2013	Haunted Nights	Lead Role	Sahara One
2011 - 2012	Bollywood Families	Anchor	Zee Zing
2004 - 2011	Chart Masala	Anchor	Zee UK (broadcast in UK, USA, EU, Canada, SE Asia
2008 - 2009	Mata Ki Chowki	Natasha	Sahara One
2007	Chhoona Hai Aasmaan	Shaheen	Star One
2007	Doli Saja Ke	Namrata Veer Kapoor	Sahara One
2006	Mano Ya Na Mano	Lead Role (Episodic)	Star One
2007	Solhah Singaarr	Menka	Sahara One
2007	Man Mein Hai Visshwas	Lead Role (Episodic)	Sony TV
2007	CID	Lead Role (Episodic)	Sony TV
2007	Aahat	Lead Role (Episodic)	Sony TV
2006	Vaidehi	Tara	Sony TV
2007	Kaajjal	Sonia	Sony TV
2004 - 2006	Saarrthi	Shefali Yuvraj Goenka	StarPlus
2004 - 2006	Daud	Anchor	Zee Music
2004	Boogie Woogie	Anchor	Zee Music

== Films ==
Year:	Serial:	Role:	Notes:
2009	Punaah	Supporting Role	
2009	My Guru	Supporting Role	
2008	Kashmakash	Supporting Role	Presented at the Los Angeles Film Festival
