= Dabangii – Mulgii Aayi Re Aayi =

Indian drama television series

- Genre: Drama; Action; Mystery
- Directed by: Arif Ali
- Starring: See below
- Country of origin: India
- Original language: Hindi
- No. of seasons: 1
- No. of episodes: 170

Production
- Producers: Herumb Khot; Nilanjana Purkayasstha
- Camera setup: Multi camera
- Running time: 20-22 minutes
- Production company: Invictus T Mediaworks

Original release
- Network: Sony Entertainment Television
- Release: 30 October 2023 – 21 June 2024

Dabangii – Mulgii Aayi Re Aayi is an Indian Hindi-language drama television series premiered on Sony Entertainment Television, and digitally streams on Sony LIV. Produced by Herumb Khot and Nilanjana Purkayasstha under Invictus T Mediaworks, the series starred Mahi Bhadra, Aamir Dalvi, Manav Gohil, Sai Deodhar, Bharati Patil, Himani Chawla and Yashashri Masurkar in the lead roles. As of February 2024, it also stars Rachana Mistry, replacing Bhadra, and Rrahul Sudhir in the lead role after the generation leap. The show went off-air on 21 June 2024.

== Plot ==
8 years prior to the current timeline, Satya murders Damini's father and is arrested by his brother, Ankush, who is a police officer. Damini, who is pregnant with Satya's child, runs away to save herself and the child. Due to her absence as witness for the murder during the trial, Satya, who is a political leader now, is acquitted in the case 8 years later.

Arya, Damini and Satya's daughter, turns out to be a feisty girl who is willing to fight anyone who troubles her. She is under the false belief that her father is a police officer, thus she wants to grow up to be a righteous and strong police officer as well.

Satya murders Damini and Ankush, but fails to murder Arya. Kasturi shoots Arya instead, but Arya is saved by Jaanrao.

=== 14 years later ===
Arya is living in hiding with Jaanrao. She has vowed to make Satya pay for all his wrongdoings.

Zai is to be wed with Yug Sisodiya, who is Satya's right-hand man. However, Yug is not who he claims to be. He is Eklavya, who is working with Ankita to bring Satya down. Zai has turned into a spoilt and materialistic woman, who is nothing like her parents. Zai accepts Satya and Kasturi as her parents and holds a grudge against Ankush and Bela, believing they favored Arya over her. Maina is ill-treated by Kasturi, while Bela has lost her senses and does not speak nor react.

Arya enters the house as a maid, Kamala, to search for evidence to bring down Satya. Arya manages to find evidence that jeopardizes Satya's political career. Satya steps down from CM running, but he shrewdly puts Kasturi in the running instead. Arya comes under the fake identity of Aira Kharkhanis and wins Kasturi's trust results she became her PA. While Yug (Eklavya) suspects Aira and keeps an eye on him. In all this Aira is hurt by Zai as she thoughts that Aira wants to come closer to Yug but later Aira is saved by Yug. Later on Satya meet his hands with Shah for illegal smuggling of alcohol to gather money for election campaign. Aira and Yug are stuck in the way of these smuggling and goons of Satya captures and tries to kill them. Also Arya finally get to know the reality of Yug as Eklavya. But they both are rescued by Ankush who had developed a revenge and aggressive behaviour in past years. Ankush makes a plan with Arya to take kill Satya by using Yug. Aira is shown to fake marriage with Yug so that she can enter Satya's house. After this Eklavya also gets to know Arya's reality. Now, Tanmay is kidnapped by Ankush creating trust issues between Satya and Kasturi but Satya get to know the reality of their plan and he kills Tanmay so that Ankush can become the accused of murder of Tanmay & he succeeds in his plan. Ankush is arrested by Eklavya & brought to Satya's house. Bela gain consciousness after returning of Ankush. As Ankush was sent to jail, Bela and Maina left the house but they are helped by Arya and get to know the reality.

Now Arya decides to free Ankush from all the criminal charges. She finally reaches the truth that Satya killed Tanmay. She makes Satya hostage so that he will accept his crime. At the time, Eklavya, Ankush and Kasturi also present there and they all had a quarrel. Eklavya plays the Satya's audio where he claims his crime. Satya is arrested & he provokes Arya to shot him & she accidentally shots him & Satya is admitted to hospital. Arya is full of guilt for shooting Satya. She donates blood to him but Satya goes to coma. Zai decides to file a case against Arya but she fails.

On the request of Kasturi, all Rajyavadhkars again reconciled at house. Zai has created fake mental issues so that she can marry Eklavya & take Arya apart from her life. Bela has become to much sensitive to Zai so she orders Arya to give the concent marry Zai and Eklavya on behalf of her family & Arya accepts Bela's demand. The marriage with Zai left Eklavya heartbroken. Zai has now started creating fake relationship closeness with Eklavya to make Arya jealous. Also she had become pregnant with the child of another boy she met earlier before her marriage. All members assumed the child was of Eklavya. Now Arya decides to leave the house agreed by Bela and Zai. But Kasturi gets to know the truth of Zai after she saw sonography report of Zai. Kasturi shares the truth with Arya but she was killed by duo of Zai and Satya. It was revealed that this was all the plan of the duo to take the revenge from the family & Satya can flee to Africa with new identity. Arya get to know their plan & she decides to save her family.

Satya has discharged from the hospital with a fake paralysis & returned home. Arya tells that she is the real heir of the house after the death of Kasturi. Arya shared the truth of Satya and Zai to Ankush and Eklavya. Now this trio makes the plan against them. They succeeded in their plan catching Satya red handed. Finally Satya and Zai are arrested.

=== After few years ===
Zai is shown in jail & her daughter Mahi was grown by Arya and Eklavya. Arya has now become IPS officer fulfilling the dream of her, her mother and Ankush. Arya and Eklavya had gott entied up and both decided to adopt Mahi.

With the note that "Nurture is greater than blood relationship", the series had a happy ending.

== Cast ==
=== Main ===
- Rachana Mistry as IPS Arya Rajyavadhkar Patil: Satya and Damini's daughter; Kasturi's step-daughter; Ankush and Bela's daughter figure; Tanmay's half–sister; Zai's cousin; Ekalavya's wife; Mahi's adoptive mother (2024)
  - Mahi Bhadra as Child Arya Rajyavadhkar (2023–2024)
- Aamir Dalvi as Abhinandan "Satya" Rajyavadhkar: A gangster and a politician; Avda and Vishwanath's elder son; Ankush and Maina's brother; Damini and Kasturi's widower; Tanmay and Arya's father; Damini, Tanmay and Kasturi's murderer (2023–2024)
- Manav Gohil as Inspector Ankush Rajyavadhkar: Avda and Vishwanath's younger son; Satya and Maina's brother; Bela's husband; Zai's father; Arya's father-figure; Mahi's grandfather (2023–2024)
- Rrahul Sudhir as ACP Ekalavya "Ekya" Patil / Yug Sisodiya: Ankita's secret agent; Dinkar's son; Zai's ex–fiancé; Arya's husband; Mahi's adoptive father (2024)
  - Rivaan Gajbhiye as Child Eklavya (2023–2024)

=== Recurring ===
- Sai Deodhar as Damini "Chhaya" Rajyavadhkar: Satya's first wife; Arya's mother (2023; 2024) (Dead)
- Yashashri Masurkar as Bela Rajyavadhkar: Ankush's wife; Zai's mother; Arya's mother-figure; Mahi's grandmother (2023–2024)
- Himani Chawla as Kasturi Rajyavadhkar: Former dancer; Satya's second wife; Tanmay's mother; Arya's step-mother (2023–2024) (Dead)
- Bharati Patil as Avda Rajyavadhkar: Vishwanath's wife; Satya, Ankush and Maina's mother; Tanmay, Zai and Arya's grandmother; Mahi's great-grandmother (2023–2024) (Dead)
- Anjum Fakih as Ankita Rao: Chief Minister of Maharashtra; Satya's rival (2023–2024)
- Jaywant Patekar as Vishwanath Rajyavadhkar: Avda's husband; Satya, Ankush and Maina's father; Tanmay, Zai and Arya's grandfather; Mahi's great-grandfather (2023–2024) (Dead)
- Prateek Kumar as Tanmay Rajyavadhkar: Satya and Kasturi's son; Arya's half–brother; Zai's cousin; Sonia's husband (2024) (Dead)
  - Heet Sharma as Child Tanmay Rajyavadhkar (2023–2024)
- Palak Purswani as Zai Rajyavadhkar: Ankush and Bela's daughter; Arya and Tanmay's cousin; Ekalavya's ex–fiancée; Kasturi's murderer; Mahi's mother (2024)
  - Nancy Makwana as Child Zai Rajyavadhkar (2023–2024)
- Shruti Purnaik as Maina Rajyavadhkar: Avda and Vishwanath's daughter; Satya and Ankush's sister; Jaanrao's wife (2023–2024)
- Sagar Rambhia as Jaanrao: Maina's husband; Arya's uncle and saviour (2023–2024)
- Arshi Srivastav as Sonia Rajyavadhkar: Tanmay's widow (2024)
- Divyangana Jain as IPS Gayatri Patil: Arya's best friend (2024)
- Harshita Tiwari as Mani (2024)
- Siddharth Raj as Akshay (2024)
- Krishna Soni as Conman(2024)

== Production ==
The series was announced on Sony Entertainment Television with Aamir Dalvi, Manav Gohil, Sai Deodhar, Bharati Patil, Himani Chawla and Yashashri Masurkar joining the cast. The principal photography of the series commenced from October 2023 at the Film City, Mumbai.

== Reception ==
Prachi Arya gave the series a three-star rating out of five in her review for India Today. The Times of India reviewed the series.
