= Kapil Arya =

Indian television actor

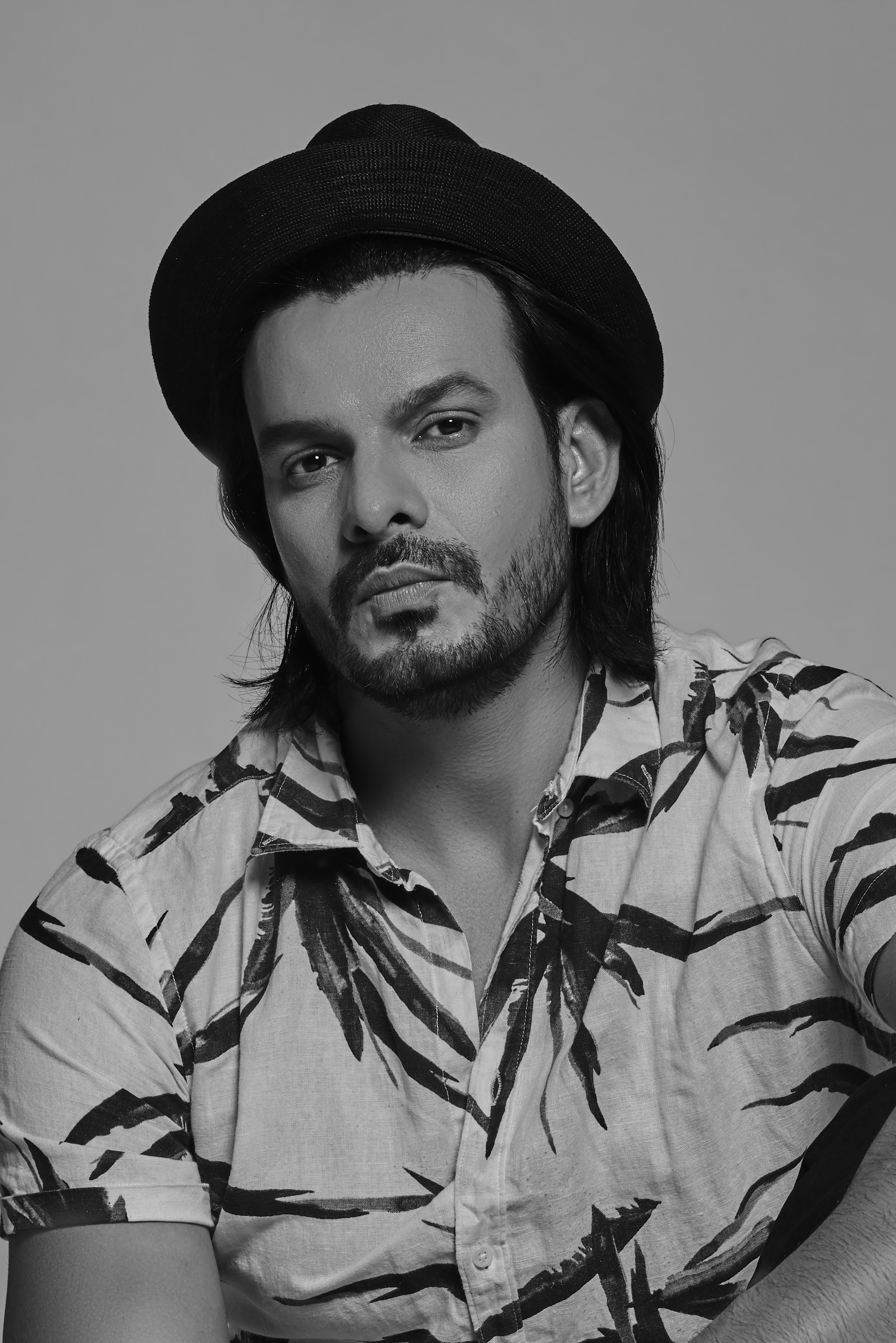
- Occupation: Actor
- Years active: 2010–present
- Spouse: Gurpreet Bedi (m. 2021)

Kapil Arya (born 21 February) is an Indian actor best known for his role of sub inspector Aditya in Life OK's SuperCops Vs SuperVillains and Bhagwan Shiva in Jag Janani Maa Vaishno Devi – Kahani Mata Rani Ki.

== Personal life ==
Kapil is married to actor Gurpreet Bedi. The couple tied the knot in Karjat on 22 December.

== Career ==
Kapil started his television career with SuperCops vs Supervillains in 2012 playing the role of sub-inspector Aditya. This was followed by his role in Zee TV's Doli Armaano Ki where he played the role of Karan.

In 2014, Kapil played the character 'Ghatotkach' in Life OK's Laut Aao Trisha followed by his character Siddhant in Rishton Ka Saudagar – Baazigar in 2016.

In 2017, Kapil played Achutya in Sony SAB's Tenali Rama (TV series), an Indian Hindi-language historical comedy drama based on the life of the legendary Telugu poet Tenali Ramakrishna and Chandrasen in Sony Television's Peshwa Bajirao (TV series) along with StarPlus's Mere Angne Mein.

Kapils highlight in 2019–2020 was his character Mahadev played in Jag Janani Maa Vaishno Devi - Kahani Mata Rani Ki

== Filmography ==
=== Television ===
Year	Show	Role	References
2012	Savdhaan India		
2012–2015	SuperCops vs Supervillains	Sub-Inspector Aditya	
2013–2015	Doli Armaano Ki	Karan	
2014	Laut Aao Trisha	Ghatotkach	
2016	Rishton Ka Saudagar – Baazigar	Siddhant	
2017	Mere Angne Mein	Ajay	
2017	Peshwa Bajirao	Chandrasen	
2017	Tenali Rama	Achutya	
2019–2020	Jag Janani Maa Vaishno Devi - Kahani Mata Rani Ki	Mahadev	
2021	Hai Taubba	Dhruv	
2022	Sasural Simar Ka 2	Rudra Rathore	
2023	Swaraj	Vasudev Balwant Phadke	
2025–Present	Shrimati Shukla	Ravi Shukla	
