= Nikita Sharma =

Indian television actress

- Born: New Delhi, India
- Occupations: Actress; model
- Years active: 2013– present
- Known for: Do Dil Ek Jaan; Swaragini - Jodein Rishton Ke Sur; Mahakali — Anth Hi Aarambh Hai; Phir Laut Aayi Naagin
- Spouse: Rohandeep Singh (m. 2021)

Nikita Sharma is an Indian television actress who primarily works in Hindi television. She made her acting debut with V The Serial portraying Taani in 2013. She earned recognition with her portrayal of Antara Kaul in Do Dil Ek Jaan, Kavita Roy in Swaragini - Jodein Rishton Ke Sur and Lakshmi in Mahakali — Anth Hi Aarambh Hai, Archana Kapoor in Shakti - Astitva Ke Ehsaas Ki and Nandini/Shivani in Phir Laut Aayi Naagin.

== Early life ==
Sharma was born and brought up in New Delhi. She completed her graduation from Delhi University.

== Personal life ==
Sharma married producer Rohandeep Singh on 14 November 2021, at a Shiv Temple in Uttarakhand.

== Career ==
=== Debut and breakthrough (2013-2016) ===
Sharma started her career as a model and made her acting debut in 2013 with V The Serial portraying Taani. She then portrayed Antara Kaul in Do Dil Ek Jaan opposite Ayaz Ahmed. It proved as a major turning point in her career. The same year she portrayed Tara in Confessions of an Indian Teenager.

In 2014, she portrayed episodic role of Pragya in Yeh Hai Aashiqui, Simone in MTV Webbed, Payal in Halla Bol, Koyal in Pyaar Tune Kya Kiya, Mahi in MTV Fanaah and Urmi in Love by Chance . She also portrayed Tania in Phir Jeene Ki Tamanna Hai, in the same year.

She portrayed Vedika in Maharakshak: Devi and Misha in Aahat, both in 2015. From 2015 to 2016, she portrayed Kavita Roy in Swaragini - Jodein Rishton Ke Sur opposite Varun Kapoor.

=== Success and recent work (2017-present) ===
Sharma in 2017, portrayed Gauri Shivam Kumar opposite Himanshu Soni in Khatmal E Ishq... Biwi Ke Naakhre..Offo !!. She portrayed Lakshmi opposite Kanan Malhotra in Mahakali — Anth Hi Aarambh Hai from 2017 to 2018.

In 2019, she appeared in Manmohini portraying Rani Rajrajeshwari and then portrayed Archana Kapoor in Shakti - Astitva Ke Ehsaas Ki opposite Vivian Dsena.

From 2019 to 2020 she portrayed dual characters of Nandini (Naagin) and Shivani opposite Jatin Bharadwaj in Phir Laut Aayi Naagin. She then portrayed an Ichhadhari Naagin in Akbar Ka Bal Birbal in 2020.

== Filmography ==
=== Television ===
Year	Title	Role	Notes	Ref.
2013	V The Serial	Taani		
2013	Do Dil Ek Jaan	Antara Kaul		
2013	Confessions of an Indian Teenager	Tara		
2014	Yeh Hai Aashiqui	Pragya		
2014	MTV Webbed	Simone	Season 2	
2014	Halla Bol	Payal		
2014	Pyaar Tune Kya Kiya	Koyal	Season 2, Episode 12	
2014	MTV Fanaah	Mahi		
2014	Phir Jeene Ki Tamanna Hai	Tania		
2014	Love by Chance	Urmi	Episode: "Andha Pyaar - Andha Kanoon"	
2015	Maharakshak: Devi	Vedika		
2015	Aahat	Misha	Season 6	
2015–2016	Swaragini - Jodein Rishton Ke Sur	Kavita Roy		
2017	Khatmal E Ishq... Biwi Ke Naakhre..Offo !!	Gauri Shivam Kumar		
2017–2018	Mahakali — Anth Hi Aarambh Hai	Lakshmi		
2019	Manmohini	Rani Rajrajeshwari		
2019	Shakti - Astitva Ke Ehsaas Ki	Archana Kapoor		
2019–2020	Phir Laut Aayi Naagin	Nandini (Naagin)/Shivani		
2020	Akbar Ka Bal Birbal	Ichhadhari Naagin		
2024	Shaitani Rasmein	Saudamini		

=== Music videos ===
Year	Title	Singer(s)	Ref.
2013	Teri Yaad	Shahjeet Bal	
2016	Antenna	Kulwinder Billa	
