= Do Dil Ek Jaan =

- Title card
- Genre: Drama; Action; Romance
- Directed by: Bhagwan Yadav; Sunith Pillai; Amit Malik
- Creative director: Neha Kothari
- Starring: Ayaz Ahmed; Nikita Sharma; Kanwar Dhillon; Shritama Mukherjee
- Country of origin: India
- Original language: Hindi
- No. of seasons: 01
- No. of episodes: 165

Production
- Producers: Saurabh Tewari; Abhinav Shukla
- Production locations: Mumbai; Kashmir; Gulmarg
- Running time: 30 minutes
- Production company: Nautanki Films

Original release
- Network: Life OK
- Release: 3 June 2013 – 24 January 2014

Do Dil... Ek Jaan (transl. Two Hearts... One Soul) is an Indian television drama series, that premiered on Life OK on 3 June 2013 and ended on 24 January 2014. It was produced by Abhinav Shukla under his Nautanki Films banner. The series starred Ayaz Ahmed, Nikita Sharma, Kanwar Dhillon and Shritama Mukherjee.

== Plot ==
Season 1 :

A Kashmiri girl named Antara moves with her mother to Mumbai, where she falls in love with a gangster, Raghu. Raghu is forced to make hard decisions about whether his allegiances lie with his gang and his godmother, Daya Mayi, or with his newfound love, Antara.

Raghu's past catches up with him when Daya Mayi's son, Satya, returns home. Satya ruins Raghu and Antara's marriage plans. When Raghu discovers that Antara is pregnant with his child, Raghu and Antara escape. Antara gives birth to their son, Vidhan, but eventually Satya finds and kills Antara. Raghu married Antara on her deathbed and she dies in his arms. Thereafter, Satya killed Raghu. Satya later marries and has a daughter, Vedika.

=== 20 years later ===
Vedika returns to the district where she falls in love with Vidhan, Raghu's son. Tragedy follows and Satya's sins come back upon him many times over, completing the cycle of violence that he began when he murdered Raghu and Antara. Vidhaan returns to seek revenge on Satya and meets Machmach who is unaware that Vidhaan is Raghu's son. When Vidhaan reveals his identity to Machmach, he vows to help him in his revenge.

Vidhaan faces Satya and a fight ensues. Vidhaan chooses to spare Saya's life who uses this as an advantage and shoots an unsuspecting Vidhaan. As Vedika witnesses Vidhaan dying, she shocks her father and kills herself by shooting herself in the chest.

A heartbroken Satya repents all the murders he committed as Machmach taunts him about his fate.

== Cast ==
=== Main ===
- Ayaz Ahmed as Raghu Nayak: Daya Mayi's foster son; Antara's lover; Vidhan’s father (Dead) Season 1 (2013 - 2014)
- Nikita Sharma as Antara Kaul: Ashok and Geeta's daughter; Raghu's lover; Vidhan’s mother (Dead) Season 1 (2013 - 2014)
- Akshay Dogra as Satya: Daya Mayi's son; Manjari's husband; Vedika's father Season 1(2013 - 2014)
- Kanwar Dhillon as Vidhaan Raghu Nayak: Raghu and Antara's son; Vedika's lover Season 1 (2013)
- Shritama Mukherjee as Vedika: Satya and Manjari's daughter; Vidhaan's lover Season 1 (2013 - 2014)

=== Recurring ===
- Farooq Sheikh as Ashok Kaul, Geeta's husband; Antara's father (Dead)
- Kishori Shahane as Geeta Kaul: Ashok's wife; Antara's mother
- Kamya Panjabi / Shilpa Shinde / Pragati Mehra as Daya Mayi: Satya's mother; Raghu's godmother; Vedika's grandmother
- Kanishka Soni as Manjari: Satya's wife; Vedika's mother
- Shubham as Ishaan Kaul: Ashok and Geeta's son; Antara's brother
- Jaskaran Gandhi as Machinder "Machmach"
- Latesh Sharma as Battery
- Vineet Kuma as Aman / Tareeq
- Jayshree T. as Aaji
- Vinny Arora as Rukhsana
- Sumit Kaul as Govind
- Resham Tipnis as Saroj
- Pawan Tiwari as Arshad
- Ridheema Tiwari as Rasika
- Darpan Srivastava as Manohar
- Ritu Vashisht as Noor Aapa
- Reema Vohra

== Music ==
The theme song, "Mera Mahi Tu", sung & Composed By Bhuvan Ahuja & Saurabh Kalsi, is based on a combination of Punjabi folk tunes and sea shanties.

In October 2016, The creator announced that Do Dil Ek Jaan would return with its season 2 which premiered Monday 5 June 2017. Starring; Vrushika Mehta and Avinash Mishra as star leads. She also announced that the show would renew its contract for a new season after each four years. In December 2020, it was announced that Season 3 would commence on Monday 31 May 2021. Starring; Surbhi Jyoti, Pearl V. Puri and Sudha Chandran as main leads.

In January 2025, it was announced that the show will be renewed for its fourth and last season. Season 4 will premiere Monday, 2 June 2025. Starring Aditi Sharma and Sidhant Gupta as main leads.

SERIES OVERVIEW :

Season 1 : 3 June 2013 - 24 January 2014

Season 2 : 5 June 2017 - 26 January 2018

Season 3 : 31 May 2021 - 28 January 2022

Season 4 : 2 June 2025 - 30 January 2026
