= Akshay Dogra =

Indian television actor

- Born: 21 September 1981 (age 45); Delhi, India
- Occupation: Actor
- Years active: 2001– present
- Spouse: Sakshi Dogra (m. 2009)
- Children: 1
- Relatives: Riddhi Dogra (sister); Arun Jaitley (uncle)

Akshay Dogra (pronounced [aːkʃeː d̪oːɡra]; born 21 September 1981) is an Indian actor and producer working in the television industry. He has worked on many shows during his career, both on-screen and off-screen. After working backstage at many shows, Akshay finally made his television debut in 12/24 Karol Bagh on Zee TV. He is known for playing Akash Singh Raizada in Iss Pyaar Ko Kya Naam Doon?, Satya Nayak in Do Dil Ek Jaan and Jagan Pawaniya in Waaris.

== Early life ==
Akshay was born and brought up in New Delhi with his younger sister, fellow actress Ridhi Dogra. Akshay was 21 when he decided to enter the entertainment business.

== Career ==
=== Beginning ===
At age 21, Akshay decided to move to Mumbai, Maharashtra to pursue a career in the entertainment business. Starting in 2002, Akshay started working behind the scenes as Executive producer as well as a member of the Creative Unit of many shows. For a while after moving to Mumbai, Akshay worked as an assistant to Deepak Tijori. He eventually moved on to acting.

=== Breakthrough ===
After transitioning from behind the camera to acting, Akshay landed a role in Zee TV's 12/24 Karol Bagh. He also acted in Kiss Kiss Bang Bang (2008) on Bindass, alongside Shweta Gulati. He played the role of Vishal from 2009 to 2010. His character was of a NRI boy who becomes engaged to Milli (Hunar Halli). Although he was not a lead and this show didn't make him a household name, it did earn him enough success to help him land his next role. He, after his role on 12/24 Karol Bagh ended, landed the role of Akash Singh Raizada in the very popular Hindi Daily Soap Opera Iss Pyaar Ko Kya Naam Doon? on STAR Plus. His character is the cousin of the male lead Arnav (Barun Sobti), who also falls in love and marries the sister, Payal (Deepali Pansare) of the female lead Khushi (Sanaya Irani). His role on this show has made him much more popular and has opened up many new pathways for him.

In 2011, he also acted in stage play, Apples and Walnut, about valley of Kashmir.

However, in October 2012, he quit the show due to lack of importance given to his character.

== Personal life ==
Akshay is married to Sakshi Dogra. They dated for six years before marrying. They have a son born on 29 February 2016 His sister Ridhi Dogra is a television actress who played the lead role in show Maryada: Lekin Kab Tak?. He is the nephew of former senior Bhartiya Janata Party politician Arun Jaitley.

== Filmography ==
Key
†	Denotes films that have not yet been released

=== Television ===
Year	Title	Role
2008	Kiss Kiss Bang Bang	Rohan
2009–2010	12/24 Karol Bagh	Vishal
2011–2012	Iss Pyaar Ko Kya Naam Doon?	Akash Singh Raizada
2012–2013	Ek Hazaaron Mein Meri Behna Hai	Devender Chaudhary
2013	Punar Vivah	Akash Suraj Pratap Sindhia
2013	Mrs. Pammi Pyarelal	Sunny
2013	Do Dil Ek Jaan	Sahib, Satya
2014	Encounter	Ramya
2016–2017	Waaris	Jagan Pawania
2018	Dil Hi Toh Hai	Rishabh Noon
2022	Jai Hanuman - Sankat Mochan Naam Tiharo	Kali Yuga

=== Film ===
Year	Title	Role	Notes
2026	Vadh 2	Keshav	

=== Web series ===
Year	Title	Role	Ref.
2021	Ramyug	Lakshmana	
