= Dhadkan (TV series) =

- Genre: Medical drama
- Based on: ER
- Written by: Charudutt Acharya, Jyotiprakash Atre, and Hansa
- Directed by: Umesh Padalkar
- Starring: See below
- Country of origin: India
- Original language: Hindi
- No. of seasons: 1
- No. of episodes: 87

Production
- Producer: Jeetu Chawla
- Camera setup: Multi-camera
- Running time: Approx. 24 minutes
- Production company: Aqua Pictures Private Limited

Original release
- Network: Sony TV
- Release: 4 February 2002

Related
- Dhadkan Zindaggi Kii

Dhadkan (transl. Heartbeat) was an Indian medical drama television series produced by Jeetu Chawla, and directed by Umesh Padalkar which premiered on Sony TV on 4 February 2002. The concept was based on American television series, ER which ran on NBC. The show aired Monday to Wednesday evenings.

== Cast ==
- Suresh Oberoi as Dr. Raj Pradhan
- Reema Lagoo as Dr. Prajakta Marathe, Gynecologist
- Vineet Kumar as Dr. Amar Marathe, Cardiologist
- Ram Kapoor as Dr. Rajiv Agarwal, Psychologist
- Sushant Singh as Dr. Alan Fernandes, (former army) doctor
- Mona Ambegaonkar as Dr. Chitra Sheshadri, pediatrician
- Achint Kaur as Miss Mallika Sareen
- Aarav Chowdhary
- Kishwer Merchant as Dr. Aditi
- Gautami Kapoor as Chanchal, patient (credited as Gautami Gadgil)
- Kabir Sadanand as Dr. Rehaan

== Spin-off ==
In 2021, Sony Entertainment Television launched a spin-off version of series on 6 December 2021 starring Additi Gupta, Rohit Purohit, Vidyut Xavier. The series was initially planned with 65 episodes, but later it was extended by ten more episodes, for a total of 75 episodes till 4 March 2022.
