= Kya Qusoor Hai Amala Ka? =

Indian Hindi-language television series

- Genre: Indian soap opera
- Created by: Andrew Timm
- Written by: Ritu bhatia (dialogue)
- Story by: Vedat Türkali
- Directed by: Nandita Mehra
- Creative director: Phuthi Nakene
- Starring: Pankhuri Awasthy Rode
- Opening theme: "Kya Qusoor Tha Mera?" by Rekha Bhardwaj
- Country of origin: India
- Original language: Hindi
- No. of seasons: 1
- No. of episodes: 156

Production
- Producers: Phuthi Nakene; Thabo Pitso
- Camera setup: Multi-camera
- Running time: 24 minutes
- Production company: 24-Frames Media

Original release
- Network: Star Plus
- Release: 3 April – 30 September 2017

Related
- Fatmagül'ün Suçu Ne?

Kya Qusoor Hai Amala Ka? (transl.What Is Amala's Fault?) is an Indian Hindi-language drama television series, which started telecasting from 3 April 2017 on Star Plus. Kya Qusoor Hai Amala Ka is an adaptation of the Turkish drama series Fatmagül'ün Suçu Ne?, which tackles the sensitive subject of sexual violence faced by women. The series is produced by 24 Frames Media. The series ended on 30 September 2017 with the discontinuation of the Star Plus afternoon programming block.

== Plot ==
Amala is a young and beautiful town girl, who lives in a small town of Dharamshala. She lost her parents at an early age, thus she lives with her elder brother Raghu and his wife Mandkini. She is engaged to her childhood friend Dev and is waiting to get married. She dreams of having her own house, where she can live her life according to her will.

Abeer is a well mannered guy who lives with his adoptive mother Karuna, who is a healer of herbal medicines. One night, Amala on the way to see off her fiancé who is departing for a working trip was caught and gang-raped by Abeer's rich friends Suveer, Evan and Viraj under the influence of drugs & alcohol. While Abeer is unaware of the reality, he finds himself guilty for the incident.

Abeer is forced to marry Amala by the powerful family of his rich friends. Amala and Abeer move to Mumbai, after marriage, to start a new life. Raghu and Mandakini, along with their kid Mannu, reach Mumbai to stay with Amala and Abeer. They are later joined by Abeer's adoptive mother, Karuna. Dev too reaches Mumbai with a motive to seek answers to his questions from Amala. He calls Abeer and threatens to kill him as he snatched away his love from him. Amala falls ill and Mando is suspicious if she is pregnant. Amala performs the test at home, and it comes out to be positive. This comes as a shock to them with Amala in a deep pain, and Abeer tensed, not knowing what to do. Karuna takes Amala to the hospital to get the test done again. The reports come out negative, and it is revealed that Amala is not pregnant, which comes as a relief to everyone. Fearing that Dev might turn into a criminal by taking his vengeance from Amala's culprits, Amala asks Abeer to leave her forever as she doesn't want him to destroy Dev's life, like he destroyed her life. Abeer wants to leave Amala and move abroad, for her own good, but at the same time his increasing concern and love for Amala is shown. A guilt-stricken Viraj tells Abeer the truth of his innocence, and him not being a rapist like them, on realising how he betrayed his own friend due to his selfishness. Abeer gets heartbroken by the truth, and later, decides to tell this to Amala. After several unrewarding attempts to express his innocence to Amala, Abeer gets successful in telling her this truth, but Amala ends up blaming him more. She tells how him and his friends have broken her beyond repair. She says that she hates herself and her life, and also, she has nothing but hatred for him too. Mando & Karuna leave for Dharamshala. Abeer accompanies Amala for her nephew's school admission. He convinces the principal to give the child a seat in the school. On their way back, Dev sees Amala but does not approach her. Abeer is slowly falling in love with Amala despite her hatred for him. The next day Raghu is lost in the shopping mall and Abeer goes looking for him. Meanwhile, Evan and Viraj are out of jail. Viraj is guilt stricken and resorts to drinking to forget his crimes. Surveer & Mahi's wedding is postponed by Manvendar. Mahi wants to find out the truth so she goes to Amla. After Abeer supports Amla, she finally gets the courage to expose her rapists because she does not want Mahi's life to get ruined because she didn't tell her the truth. At this time, Evaan has figured out that Amla is coming to expose them, he hires goons to come and kill Abeer and Amla. Abeer and Amla successfully fight the goons back and they reach the wedding venue, the Malik house. There the Maliks have set up extra security in order for them to not enter the wedding. Amla successfully exposes the three rapists and the wedding is called off. Later Evaan marries Mahi to revenge from Rishan. Also Amla files a case against Evaan, Suveer, and Viraj. Abeer has no action taken against him because he was innocent and he supported Amla. All three of the guys and sentenced to life time imprisonment. Rishan Malik, Suveer's father, shoots himself because of his sons actions and the humiliation he would have to face. Amla finally gets justice and Abeer and Amla live happily together.

== Production ==
Popular Turkish series Fatmagül'ün Suçu Ne? was dubbed in Hindi and broadcast in India in 2016 on Zindagi TV after the success of teen-age romance drama Feriha. Both the series achieved a rating success which in turn caused many other popular Turkish shows like Kuzey Guney, A Love Story and Little Lord to be shown in India in dubbed form. Subsequently 24 Frames television production company acquired rights of the series from Eccho Rights to be remade in India with show's original creators giving important input for the remake. The show was developed by Purnendu Shekhar, Nandita Mehra and Bhairavi Raichura of 24 Frames. The initial phase of the show is set in Dharamshala and the crew shot on location for a month in Himachal Pradesh.Pankhuri Awasthy Rode of Razia Sultan fame was cast as the lead role of Amala (Fatmagul) and debutant Rajveer Singh was cast as the male lead role of Abeer (Kerim).

Amitabh Bacchan provided monologue for the series and appeared in a promo promoting the show and speaking about awareness of how victims of rape are constantly ostracised.

== Cast ==
Actor	Role	Based on	Description
Pankhuri Awasthy	Amala	Fatmagul Ketenci Ilgaz	Amala was raped by Evan, Suveer and Viraj. Was in love with Dev; they were engaged. Later, forced by her family, she marries Abeer. Raghu's younger sister. Manu's aunt. Mandakini sister-in-law.
Rajveer Singh	Abeer Anand	Kerim Ilgaz	Abeer falls in love with Amala after marrying her when forced by the rapists to take upon the blame of the rape incident. Later supports her in the fight against her rapists.
Anant V Joshi	Dev	Mustafa Nalçali	Hemraj and Pushpa's son. He falls in love with Amala, and they were engaged, but after the rape he leaves her. Swore vengeance on the rapists and Abeer.
Vaibhavi Upadhyay	Esha	Asu/Hacer Ovacık Nalçali	Worked as an escort.
Siddharth Sen	Evan Malik	Erdoğan Yaşaran	Amala's rapist. Raunak and Hema's son. Rishan's nephew. Suveer's cousin. Viraj's friend.Mahi's husband.
Fahmaan Khan	Suveer Malik	Selim Yaşaran	Amala's rapist. Rishan and Pallavi's son. Raunak's nephew. Evan's cousin. Viraj's friend. Mahi's fiancé.
Rajesh Khattar	Rishan Malik	Reşat Yaşaran	Raunak's younger brother. Pallavi's husband. Suveer's father. Evan's uncle.
Purva Parag	Karuna	Meryem Aksoy / Pakalın ("Ebe Nine")	Abeer's adoptive aunt who raised him after his mother's death. Healer of herbal medicine.
Vijay Tilani	Viraj	Vural Namli	Amala's rapist. Evan and Suveer's friend.
Vandana Sajnani	Pallavi Malik	Perihan Yaşaran	Rishan's wife. Suveer's mother. Evan's aunt.
Akshay Anand	Viren Asthana	Münir Telci	Maliks' Lawyer. Rishan's brother-in-law. Pallavi's brother.
Kasturi Banerjee	Hema Malik	Hilmiye Yaşaran	Raunak's wife. Evan's mother. Suveer's aunt.
Deepak Kripalani	Raunak Malik	Rıfat Yaşaran	Evan's father. Hema's husband. Rishan's brother.
Neha Saraf	Mandakini aka Mando	Mukkades Ketenci	Amala's sister-in-law. Dislikes Amala. Married to Raghu.
Kavin Dave	Raghu	Rahmi Ketenci	Amala's brother. Loves his sister a lot. Married to Mandakini.
Suparna Krishna	Mahi	Meltem Alagöz	Evan's wife. Suveer's ex-fiancé. Manwinder's only daughter.
Surendra Pal Singh	Manwinder	Turaner Alagöz	Mahi's father.
Karmveer Choudhary	Hemraj	Emin Nalçali	Dev's father.
Salman Shaikh	Sunny	Samin	Annie's pimp and later good friend.
Leena Balodi	Pushpa	Halide Nalçali	Dev's mother.
Tanu Vidyarthi	Divya	Leman Namlı	Viraj's mother. Darshan's wife.
Om Aditya Yadav	Manu	Murat Ketenci	Amala's nephew
