= Rohit Purohit =

Indian television actor

- Born: 8 June 1988 (age 38); Jaipur, Rajasthan, India
- Occupations: Actor; model
- Years active: 2009–present
- Known for: Razia Sultan; Porus; Dil Toh Happy Hai Ji; Dhadkan Zindaggi Kii; Yeh Rishta Kya Kehlata Hai
- Spouse: Sheena Bajaj (m. 2019)
- Children: 1

Rohit Purohit (born 8 June 1988) is an Indian actor who works in Hindi television. Purohit is best known for his portrayal of Malik Altunia in Razia Sultan, Alexander in Porus, Ranvijay Shroff in Dil Toh Happy Hai Ji, Dr. Vikrant Saxena in Dhadkan Zindaggi Kii and Armaan Poddar in Yeh Rishta Kya Kehlata Hai.

== Early life ==
Purohit was born on 8 June 1988 in Jaipur, Rajasthan into a Marwari family.

== Personal life ==
Purohit dated his Arjun co-actor Sheena Bajaj for six years. He married Bajaj on 22 January 2019 in Jaipur.

The couple got blessed with their first child, a boy, Aarush on 15 September 2025.

== Career ==
=== Early career (2008–2015) ===
Before turning as actor, Purohit worked as a stuntman for Hrithik Roshan in Jodhaa Akbar. Purohit started his acting career with StarPlus's fictional drama Shaurya Aur Suhani portraying Chitwan. He then portrayed episodic roles as Vikram and Dushyanta in two episodes of Imagine TV's Mahima Shani Dev Ki and Marco D'Souza in an episode of Sony TV's Adaalat and portrayed the antagonist Prince Aryaman in Colors TV's Aise Karo Naa Vidaa.

Purohit went onto portray prominent role of Suraj Purohit in Zee TV's Sanskaar Laxmi, Bhadrasaal in Imagine TV's Chandragupta Maurya, Varun Kashyap the Rubber Man in Life OK's Super Cops Vs Super Villains - Shapath, Karan in StarPlus's Arjun. He then appeared in an episode of Sony TV's Encounter as Girish Sinha and in an episode of StarPlus's Ishq Kills as Aryan Khanna. He also appeared as a Contestant in seasons 1 to 3 of Box Cricket League.

=== Breakthrough and critical acclaim (2015–2022) ===
Purohit portrayed the lead role of Malik Altunia opposite Pankhuri Awasthy in 2015 in then newly launched &TV's Razia Sultan, a major turning point in his career. He also portrayed Dara Shikoh in ABP News's documentary series Bharatvarsh in 2016. He then portrayed the main antagonist Alexander in Sony TV's Porus from 2017 till the show completed its run in 2018 and received praises for his role.

Purohit portrayed the antagonistic role of Advocate Ranvijay Shroff in StarPlus's Dil Toh Happy Hai Ji in 2019. After a hiatus of two years, Purohit returned with Sony TV's limited episodes based medical drama Dhadkan Zindaggi Kii in 2021 in the lead role of Dr. Vikrant Saxena opposite Additi Gupta until the show completed its run in 2022.

=== Expansion to commercial exposure (2022–present) ===
Later in same year he entered Colors TV's Udaariyaan post generational leap as Advait Kapoor until he quit the show in March 2023. In same year he portrayed lead role of Gaurav Shukla opposite Krutika Desai in Shemaroo Umang's Gauna – Ek Pratha, but the show went off air in few months.

Since March 2024, Purohit is seen portraying the leading role of Advocate Armaan Poddar opposite Samridhii Shukla in StarPlus's longest running series Yeh Rishta Kya Kehlata Hai. He has been praised for his role as Armaan Poddar, gaining fame.

== Media image ==
In 2026, he was listed amongst the "Television's Hardest-Working Under 40 TV Stars" by the Variety India.

== Filmography ==
=== Television ===
Year	Title	Role	Notes	Ref.
2009	Shaurya Aur Suhani	Chitwan		
2010	Mahima Shani Dev Ki	Vikram	Episodic appearance	
2010	Mahima Shani Dev Ki	Dushyanta	Episodic appearance	
2010	Adaalat	Marco D'Souza	Episodic appearance	
2010	Aise Karo Naa Vidaa	Prince Aryaman "Arya" Singh		
2011	Sanskaar Laxmi	Suraj Purohit		
2011–2012	Chandragupta Maurya	Bhadrasaal		
2013	Super Cops Vs Super Villains - Shapath	Varun Kashyap the Rubber Man		
2013–2014	Arjun	Karan		
2014	Encounter	Girish Sinha	Episodic appearance	
2014	Ishq Kills	Aryan Khanna	Episodic appearance	
2014–2015, 2016, 2018	Box Cricket League	Contestant	Seasons 1–3	
2015	Razia Sultan	Malik Altunia		
2016	Bharatvarsh	Dara Shikoh	Episode: "Story of Dara Shikoh"	
2017–2018	Porus	Alexander		
2019	Dil Toh Happy Hai Ji	Advocate Ranvijay "RV" Shroff		
2021–2022	Dhadkan Zindaggi Kii	Dr. Vikrant Saxena		
2022–2023	Udaariyaan	Advait Kapoor		
2023	Gauna – Ek Pratha	Gaurav Shukla		
2024–present	Yeh Rishta Kya Kehlata Hai	Advocate Armaan "Aaru" Poddar		

==== Special appearances ====
Year	Title	Role	Ref.
2024, 2026	Anupamaa	Advocate Armaan "Aaru" Poddar	
2025, 2026	Udne Ki Aasha	Advocate Armaan "Aaru" Poddar	

=== Music videos ===
Year	Title	Singer(s)	Ref.
2023	Kam Toh Nahi	Payal Dev	

== Awards and nominations ==
Year	Award	Category	Work	Result	Ref
2018	Asian Television Awards	Best Actor in a Supporting Role	Porus	Nominated	
2022	Indian Television Academy Awards	Best Actor – Drama	Dhadkan Zindaggi Kii	Nominated	
2024	Indian Television Academy Awards	Best Actor – Popular	Yeh Rishta Kya Kehlata Hai	Nominated	
2025	Indian Telly Awards	Fan Favorite Actor	Yeh Rishta Kya Kehlata Hai	Won	
2025	Indian Telly Awards	Best Onscreen Couple (with Samridhii Shukla)	Yeh Rishta Kya Kehlata Hai	Nominated	
2025	Indian Telly Awards	Fan Favorite Jodi (with Samridhii Shukla)	Yeh Rishta Kya Kehlata Hai	Nominated	
2025	Indian Telly Awards	Fan Favorite Star – Star Plus	Yeh Rishta Kya Kehlata Hai	Nominated	
