= Pankhuri Awasthy =

Indian television actress

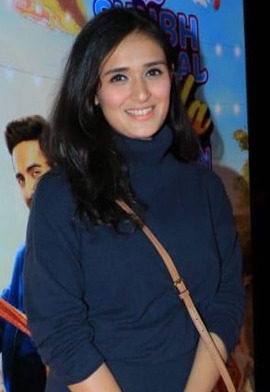
- Awasthy in 2020
- Born: Pankhuri Awasthi; 31 March 1991 (age 35); Lucknow, Uttar Pradesh, India
- Occupation: Actress
- Years active: 2014–present
- Known for: Razia Sultan; Suryaputra Karn; Yeh Rishta Kya Kehlata Hai; Gud Se Meetha Ishq
- Spouse: Gautam Rode (m. 2018)
- Children: 2

Pankhuri Awasthy Rode (née Awasthi; born 31 March 1991) is an Indian actress who mainly works in Hindi television. She made her acting debut in 2014 with Yeh Hai Aashiqui portraying Saima. Awasthy Rode is best known for her portrayal of Razia Sultan in Razia Sultan and Draupadi in Suryaputra Karn.

Awasthy's other notable include portraying Vedika in Yeh Rishta Kya Kehlata Hai and Kajal Bhatt Khurana in Gud Se Meetha Ishq. She made her film debut with Shubh Mangal Zyada Saavdhan in 2021.

== Early life ==
Awasthy was born on 31 March 1991 in Lucknow, Uttar Pradesh. She grew up in Delhi but moved to Bangalore for a job in marketing. In 2014, she ultimately moved to Mumbai to pursue a career in acting.

== Personal life ==
In October 2017, Awasthy got engaged to actor Gautam Rode. Awasthy and Rode got married on 5 February 2018 in Alwar. In April 2023, the couple announced their pregnancy. On 25 July 2023, the couple became parents to twins, a boy, Raditya and a girl, Radhya.

== Career ==
Rode played the role of Seher in MTV Fanaah Season 2. After that, she played the role of Razia Sultan in &TV's historical drama Razia Sultan. She also played Draupadi in the mythological drama Suryaputra Karn. In 2017, she played the lead role of Amla in Star Plus's show Kya Qusoor Hai Amala Ka?, which is an Indian adaptation of famous Turkish show Fatmagül'ün Suçu Ne?.

In 2019, she played an episodic role in the Colors TV's show Kaun Hai? as Pauloma / Anvesha and also appeared in the & TV's show Laal Ishq. From June 2019 to January 2020 she played the role of Vedika Agarwal in Star Plus's drama Yeh Rishta Kya Kehlata Hai.

Awasthy made her debut in Hindi cinema with Shubh Mangal Zyada Saavdhan, which was released on 21 February 2020. In 2021, she joined Sab TV's show Maddam Sir in the role of ASI Mira, a humanoid robot. In 2022, she portrayed Kajal "Kaju" Bhatt Khurana in Gud Se Meetha Ishq.

In July 2025, she played Sarla in Colors TV's Dhaakad Beera after a three year television hiatus.

== Filmography ==
=== Films ===
Year	Title	Role	Notes	Ref.
2020	Shubh Mangal Zyada Saavdhan	Kusum Nigam		

=== Television ===
Year	Title	Role	Notes	Ref.
2014	Yeh Hai Aashiqui – My Dil Goes Left Right Left	Saima (Episode 47)	Episodic role	
2014	MTV Fanaah Season 2	Seher	Episodic role	
2015	Razia Sultan	Razia Sultan	Lead Role	
2015–2016	Suryaputra Karn	Draupadi	Supporting Role	
2017	Kya Qusoor Hai Amala Ka	Amala	Lead Role	
2018	Kaun Hai?	Pauloma / Anvesha (Note: The show was earlier titled as 'Khauff', to which the citation refers.')	Episode: "The Mysterious Doll Of Putulgunj"	
2018	Laal Ishq	Episode 27	Episode: "Mayong"	
2019–2020	Yeh Rishta Kya Kehlata Hai	Vedika	Supporting Role	
2021–2023	Maddam Sir	ASI Mira / Mira G		
2022	Gud Se Meetha Ishq	Kajal "Kaju" Bhatt Khurana	Lead Role	
2025	Dhaakad Beera	Sarla Beniwal	Cameo	

=== Web series ===
Year	Title	Role	Notes	Ref.
2022	PNP Junction	Priya		

== Awards and nominations ==
Year	Award	Category	Work	Result	Ref.
2015	Indian Telly Awards	Fresh New Face - Female	Razia Sultan	Nominated	
2015	Gold Awards	Debut in a Lead Role (Female)	Razia Sultan	Nominated	
