= Yeh Rishta Kya Kehlata Hai =

Indian television series

- Genre: Soap opera
- Created by: Rajan Shahi
- Written by: Ghazala Nargis; Dialogues: Raghuvir Shekhawat (2009–2013); Munisha Rajpal (2009–2022); Aparajita Sharma; Divy Nidhi Sharma; (present)
- Screenplay by: Bhavna Vyas
- Story by: Saba Mumtaz (2009–present); Zama Habib (2016–present); Bandana Tiwari; Ghanshyam Bhatt; Vaishali Naik; Pankhuri Gangwal
- Directed by: Romesh Kalra; Rishi Mandial; Ram Pandey; Neeraj Baliyan; Jai Singh
- Creative directors: Vivek Bahl; Manali Karia; Gehna Maheshwari
- Starring: Hina Khan; Karan Mehra; Shivangi Joshi; Mohsin Khan; Pranali Rathod; Harshad Chopda; Samridhii Shukla; Shehzada Dhami; Rohit Purohit
- Music by: Navin Tripathi; Manish Tripathi; Paresh Shah
- Opening theme: Yeh Rishta Kya Kehlata Hai by Alka Yagnik
- Country of origin: India
- Original language: Hindi
- No. of seasons: 4
- No. of episodes: 5,342

Production
- Executive producers: Vivek Jain; Gyan Singh; Neeraj Dhigra; Parshotam Kumar
- Producer: Rajan Shahi
- Cinematography: Arjun Rao; Shahnoor Khan; Shashi K. Jaiswal; Vishal Desai; Dharmendra Biswas
- Editor: Sameer Gandhi
- Camera setup: Multi-camera
- Running time: 20–22 minutes
- Production company: Director's Kut Productions

Original release
- Network: StarPlus
- Release: 12 January 2009 – present

Related
- Yeh Rishtey Hain Pyaar Ke

Yeh Rishta Kya Kehlata Hai (transl. What Is This Relationship Called?), also known by the initialism YRKKH, is an Indian Hindi-language romantic family drama television series that airs on StarPlus and streams on Disney+ Hotstar. It premiered on 12 January 2009 and is the longest running Indian television soap opera. The series is produced by Rajan Shahi under Director's Kut Productions. It stars Samridhii Shukla and Rohit Purohit. It previously starred Hina Khan, Karan Mehra, Shivangi Joshi, Mohsin Khan, Pranali Rathod, Harshad Chopda, and Shehzada Dhami.

== Premise ==
The series follows generational stories of Akshara Maheshwari and Naitik Singhania, Naira Singhania and Kartik Goenka, Advocate Akshara Goenka and her story with Dr. Abhimanyu Birla and later on with Abhinav Sharma and Advocate Abhira Sharma and Advocate Armaan Poddar and their struggles balancing their married lives amongst their children and extended family members in a Marwari setup against the backdrop of Udaipur.

== Plot ==
Akshara and Naitik are a happily married couple blessed with their two children – Naksh and Naira. As times throws them challenges like Naitik slipping to coma and Akshara handling business and little Naksh in his absence, them getting his father Rajshekhar married to his doctor Devyani, a domestic abuse survivor, after the death of his biological mother Gayatri, them getting ousted from home after Naitik's uncle Mahendra dies and raising the children away in Cape Town and setting up their successful restaurant business and their return to home after several years, Naksh's passionate relationship with Nayantara and the heartbreaking breakup at wedding altar and a teenaged Naira fleeing to Rishikesh due to a misunderstanding regarding her friend's death and coming back home after several years, their love and understanding surviving these tests of time.

As Akshara dies in an accident, the story moves forward with grown up Naira and Kartik. Misunderstandings tests their love as Naira battles with a brain clot and infertility after the death of their first child while Kartik battles to create his own identity as he gets to know about his biological mother Saumya dying due to her mental illness and his father Manish and step-mother Swarna hided this truth from him and his sister Keerti so that they doesn't form wrong interpretation for their mother and Swarna sacrificed her own son Shubham for same. Kartik and Naira get blessed with a son Kairav and a daughter, also named Akshara but Naira dies in an accident and a depressed Kartik meets Sirat, a boxer and Naira's lookalike who immediately bonds with his little children as a mother. They eventually fall in love and marries and get blessed with a daughter Aarohi. However their deaths causes a strain in relationship of the sisters as the truth about Naira and Sirat gets revealed turning Aarohi possessive for her mother.

Story now moved forwards with now grown up Akshara, an aspiring and passionate singer and Abhimanyu. After initial confusion around Aarohi being the prospective bride, the two gets married while Aarohi too marries Abhimanyu's half-brother Neil. But tragedy strikes when a pregnant Aarohi loses Neil and a depressed Abhimanyu blames Akshara for it and divorces a pregnant Akshara who eventually finds solace with Abhinav in Kasauli and gives birth to her son Abhir and starts practicing her law. Soon Abhinav dies only to be revealed that Akshara is pregnant with his child. Akshara and Abhimanyu decides to reconcile but Aarohi's death banishes them from the family for the sake of Aarohi's daughter Ruhi. Soon Akshara is left all alone once again when Abhimanyu and Abhir too die and she dedicates her life to her daughter Abhira in Mussoorie.

Story moves forward with now a successful lawyer Akshara raising her final year law aspirant daughter Abhira. Soon Abhira clashes with Armaan, Akshara's former mentee who highly regards Akshara as his idol while Akshara too regards him as her best student. Abhira's stalker Yuvraj killing Akshara forces Abhira and Armaan to get married only to reveal that Armaan was in love with now grown up Ruhi who married his half-brother Rohit on his behest. Soon both couples fall for each other while Ruhi offers to be a surrogate to Abhira and Armaan's child after they lost their first child while saving Ruhi's son Daksh while Abhira and Armaan leave home as Armaan's biological mother Shivani is being revealed alive and was kept away from him as his father Madhav married her against family and treated Armaan as an outsider throughout his life for same. But the happiness is short lived as Shivani and Rohit die in a blast and the couple faces challenges again as Armaan faces anxiety regarding the unborn child and fears that it's fate will be same as his childhood around the family and raises their only daughter Maira as a single parent away from Abhira in Mount Abu but repents and reconciles with her after Geetanjali, who forcefully married him dies while trying to kill them. Then the couple faces challenges raising Maira when his client Meher's driver's daughter Vani enters the scene and due to Armaan's step-mother Vidya and Meher's created misunderstandings Abhira goes away with Vani renaming her to Mukti for years. As Meher dies, the misunderstandings get cleared and the family reunites by adopting Mukti but their happiness is short lived as Armaan battles with brain tumour. As he defeats his tumour the couple battles new challenges while resuming their law practice after a pause along with the teenaged girls now entering their college lives and their conflict with Maira as she falls for Kabir, the son of Armaan's rivals Damanis.

The series also parallelly focuses on the stories of Akshara's brother Shaurya with her best friend Varsha, her cousin Anshuman with Jasmeet, Naitik's sister Rashmi, a survivor of domestic abuse raising her daughter, also named Gayatri alone and finding love again in Sameer and his cousin Nandini's story with his best friend Mohit as they navigate raising their adopted son Yash and biological son Anmol and also on Devyani's children Naman with Karishma and Muskaan with Alok. The second generation parallelly focuses on story of Naksh with Keerti, a domestic abuse survivor, as they navigate through a second chance in love while Gayatri's story too with Kartik's youngest uncle Samarth and Anmol's story with Kartik's cousin Mansi. The third generation parallelly focuses on story of Aarohi, also a doctor and Neil along with Kairav with Abhinav's sister Muskaan. The fourth generation parallelly follows the stories of Ruhi and Rohit along with cousin sisters of Armaan, Charu and Kiara with Abhir who turns out to be alive and Armaan's cousin brothers Krish and Aryan with Tanya and Disha respectively.

== Production ==
=== Development ===
Filming of the show began on 11 September 2008. It was launched at Rambagh Palace in Jaipur, Rajasthan. In January 2009, the series was promoted through a campaign at six main cities by StarPlus along with Jagran Solutions. A contest was held in the country among over 1000 married couples out of which fifty of them were selected through events like quizzes and on air test on radios. They were made to remarry with the rituals along with the games and events held in Rambagh Palace.

In January 2010, a sequence was shot without any dialogue, with only background music used during dramatic scenes when the Singhania family learn that the character Akshara motivates the love between her sister-in-law Nandini and Naitik's friend Mohit, against them.

In January 2013, Yeh Rishta Kya Kehlata Hai was sent notice by channel for its ending due to decreasing ratings. However it received extension until June 2013 while the ratings rose and the decision of ending was dropped. Besides, twice again it received notice for ending but soon when the ratings increased after it, the plan was dropped and the series continued.

During November 2014, lead Hina Khan could not attend shooting for a few days due to her other work schedules and the track was altered for her absence. In December 2014, a scene where characters Naman and Karishma kiss was cut from the broadcast to avoid offending the show's audience.

The show took its first leap of 4 years on 30 November 2012 after the car accident of Naitik as he slips into a coma. It then took a leap of 10 years on 30 March 2015 after Kaveri banished Akshara from the house owing to Mahendra Pratap's death. Then a leap of some years was taken on 16 May 2016 after teenage Naira running away from her home fearing imprisonment. Another leap of 2 years was taken on 21 May 2018 after Shubam's death as Swarna ousts her. It took a leap of 5 years on 7 June 2019 after Naira leaves the Goenka house on Kartik's misconception about her. On 18 October 2021, The show took a leap of 8 years where Sirat was shown a single mother to Aarohi and Akshara while Kartik was abroad to drop teenaged Kairav and Vansh to hostels. On 27 October 2021, a leap of 12 years was taken after Kartik and Sirat's deaths and the story started focussing on Abhimanyu and grown up Akshara and Aarohi. On 25 August 2022, the show took a leap of 1 year where Akshara was helping Dr. Kunal's sister, Maya, and was living away from her family and Abhimanyu. On 6 January 2023, show took another leap of 6 years and it was shown that while Akshara is raising her son Abhir after legally marrying Abhinav in Kasauli and Aarohi is raising her and Neil's daughter Ruhi as a single mother post Neil's death with Abhimanyu fulfilling her fatherly responsibilities. On 6 November 2023, show took a leap of 22 years after Aarohi, Abhimanyu and Abhir's deaths and started focussing on Akshara's daughter, Abhira, Armaan and grown up Ruhi. On 19 May 2025, the show took a leap of seven years after Abhira and Armaan's separation.

The ten-year leap in March 2015 was slightly delayed as the casting of adult Naksh was not finalised. Producers auditioned over 200 people before choosing Rohan Mehra. In April 2016, both Hina Khan and Karan Mehra refused to play the role as in-laws after the on-going wedding track of their onscreen son Naksh and Tara. Thus, the track was altered such that the wedding was called off.

During January 2017, at the filming of pre-wedding sequences of the lead characters Naira and Kartik, fire broke out on the sets due to a short circuit. Common people were auditioned at Delhi during 4 and 5 February 2017 and cast for Baraati in Naira and Kartik's wedding.

In August 2017, the wedding dress of the character Keerti, for her and Naksh's marriage sequence, was designed by Bollywood fashion designer Neeta Lulla.

Pankhuri Awasthy was cast in June 2019 as Vedika, whose role was supposed to be for three months. However, with the increased ratings, becoming most watched Hindi GEC for few weeks in urban, her role was extended with her exit in January 2020 while in between she took a break in October and re-entered in November 2019.

Speaking about Yeh Rishta Kya Kehlata Hai's success producer Rajan Shahi said, "Yeh Rishta Kya Kehlata Hai doing well is something we have to strive for each and every day. When a show completes this number of episodes, it becomes a challenge as to how to sustain the show. There are so many topics to choose from and there are so many relationships, so that becomes a major challenge, to keep the freshness alive. Drama, intrigue, etc is just a part of storytelling but to still keep the essence alive that is the challenge, it is always a day to day battle". He also quoted that the elaborate festival celebrations shown is the strength of the series.

Speaking about the introduction of transition in the story from Akshara and Naitik to Naira and Kartik, Shahi said, "We were losing out on the young audience when things were going sweet between (original protagonists) Akshara and Naitik. With the introduction of Kartik and Naira -- a couple that is imperfect, makes mistake and learns from the mistakes -- the audience again found a connection with the on-screen characters. That is how our show has stood strong against the test of time". In May 2017 Shahi stated:

"With due respect to both the actors, it is a fact that after Karan left, we could consolidate our position and the TRPs actually increased. After Hina's exit too, the show has grown. This is not to say that they did not contribute to the show, but we were not able to shoot when those two were a part of the show as they had so much baggage. There were just two-three hours of shooting with the lead actors. Now, even if we are given a choice, the writers wouldn't want Akshara back".

For his above statement both Khan and Mehra expressed their displeasure where Khan stated:

"During that time, he went on record to praise both of us for our dedication and professionalism. And honestly, we were probably the only lead pair on television who continued to be with the show for eight consecutive years. Despite the work pressure, disagreements and other work opportunities, we continued to stay loyal to the show and supported the producer. But now that we are not doing the show, he's very conveniently contradicting his own statements".

Mehra stated:

"If he is saying that I worked for two-three hours, he is referring to someone else because my attendance register is the proof. Also, I gave my notice period in advance. I don't know who he has a grudge against and why is he saying it now? I was thanked by the channel and Rajan sir when I quit, so I don't understand how this has emerged now".

In May 2022, actress Pranali Rathod worn a bridal lehenga worth ₹2.5 Lacs approximately for Akshara and Abhimanyu's wedding sequence, the costliest lehenga ever worn by any YRKKH actress. It was also reported that the whole wedding sequence which was shot in Samode Palace of Jaipur costed a budget around ₹2 Crores including whole cast's stay and special Rajasthani traditional costumes, the highest ever budget spent on marriage sequence of any Indian television series.

In March 2024, after the termination of Shehzada Dhami and Pratiksha Honmukhe, Shahi stated:

"I have had a lot of controversies with actors, but I feel nobody is above the show, not even the producer. We have big stakes for a show, but when actors or some newcomers come in and suddenly they get success, which is very short-lived today, they suddenly start taking themselves so seriously. They start believing the world does not exist without them. With fresh talent, they end up coming late on a shift… there is no place in Director's Kut Production for such people".

=== Casting ===
Title screen featuring Hina Khan and Karan Mehra

Title screen featuring Shivangi Joshi and Mohsin Khan

Title screen featuring Jay Soni, Pranali Rathod, Harshad Chopda and Karishma Sawant

Hina Khan was cast to play Akshara Singhania, making her acting debut. Khan stated that she knew nothing about acting while signing the series quoting, "I didn't learn acting from anywhere. I think it's because of luck that I landed up in TV. Even after that I had to do a lot of hard work. It was more difficult for me when I began acting and straight away I had to perform. I never got to learn". Karan Tacker was initially roped for the role of Naitik, but was replaced by Karan Mehra a day before the promo shoot as Tacker became skeptical. Speaking about it producer Rajan Shahi said, "Karan refused to be a part of the show a day and a half prior to shooting the promo. I needed to hunt for a new face on immediate basis. I accidentally met Karan Mehra, a real life replica of my fictitious character Naitik".

In June 2016, Mehra quit the show, because of health issues. Two sequences were shot before his exit: one was his death track and other was his kidnap track and decision was made to take the story with the kidnapping track. Then, he was replaced by Vishal Singh in August 2016, making his entry with the kidnapping sequence in Switzerland. In November 2016, Hina Khan quit as her character became monotonous for her and she was shown killed in a car accident. Shivangi Joshi playing Naira and Mohsin Khan playing Kartik, who entered in May 2016, became the leads as the story focused on their journey.

In 2012, Sanjay Gandhi playing Mahendra quit due to the issues between him and his co-actors Sonali Verma and Sandeep Mehta who was then replaced by Abhijit Lahiri. The latter also quit after the death of his character in March 2015. In 2012, Urmila Sharma was replaced by Sunitha Rao as Rukmini. In September 2013, Ather Habib playing Shaurya quit as he felt nothing more was there to explore in his character and was replaced by Yash Gera. Gera also quit in 2017 due to the same reason as that of Habib. He was replaced by Sameer Sharma in the spin-off series during March 2019. In December 2013, Sonali Verma quit her role as Gayathri Singhania, because Verma planned to get married and move to the United States. Her character was killed after a fall from a cliff.

In 2015, Aman Sharma playing Anshuman quit as he wanted to search for better opportunities and was replaced by Dheeraj Gumbar who also quit in mid 2016.

In 2015, Ayush Agarwal quit for personal reasons and was replaced by Shamik Abbas. In May 2016, Umang Jain playing Nayantara and her on-screen family members quit as the story started to focus on other tracks after the cancellation of her and Naksh's wedding in the show after Hina Khan playing Akshara refused to play the role of a mother-in-law.

In September 2016, Rohan Mehra playing Naksh quit to participate in Bigg Boss and was replaced by Rishi Dev. Dev also quit in December 2018 as he wished to focus on his YouTube channel and was replaced by Shehzad Shaikh. In September 2017, Kanchi Singh playing Gayatri Deora quit as her character was sidelined and was replaced by Deblina Chatterjee in November 2018.

Anshul Pandey playing Naman quit in October 2016 who was replaced by Jay Pathak in the spin-off series during March 2019. In January 2018, Priyanka Udhwani playing Karishma quit as nothing was left for her character. In July 2018, Vaishnavi Rao was cast as Mansi which was earlier played by Shreya Sharma as the makers considered the former better for the role. Shirin Sewani who was last seen in November 2018 playing Jasmeet in this series was replaced by Soniya Kaur in the spin-off series in March 2019.

Parul Chauhan quit in April 2019 as she did not want to play a grandmother and was replaced by Niyati Joshi as Swarna. As the story was about to take a leap, in May 2019, Mohena Singh playing Keerti quit after getting married, and was replaced by Harsha Khandeparkar in August 2020. Deblina Chatterjee playing Gayatri quit as she was not interested in playing a mother, and was replaced by Simran Khanna. Sreshth Saxena and Shubh Saxena also quit due to the leap as their characters need to be shown as grown up teenagers. Shaurya Shah, who entered in June 2019 as Kairav, quit the following month due to health issues, and was immediately replaced by Tanmay Rishi.

In January 2020, Anmol Jyotir who played teenage Nishanth Maheshwari until 2017 was cast along with his real life twin Apoorva Jyotir to play teenage Kush and Luv. As a result of COVID-19 pandemic restrictions, actors younger than ten years of age were prohibited from performing on set, so when shooting resumed in June 2020, Tanmay Rishi Shah and Maaz Champ shot their sequences from home. However, due to the requirement of characters Kairav and Vansh on the sets, they were replaced by Aarambh Trehan Sehgal and Siddharth Dubey in October 2020. Actress Vrushika Mehta was cast to do a cameo Dr. Riddhima in November 2020 and completed her sequences in December 2020.

In October 2021, Mohsin Khan playing Kartik left the show as well as child actors Aarambh Trehan Sehgal and Siddharth Dubey. Shivangi Joshi playing Sirat and actresses Shilpa Raizada and Simran Khanna playing Surekha and Gayatri respectively left the show after the 8 year leap sequence post the next generation leap, Pranali Rathod was cast to play Akshara Goenka and Harshad Chopda was cast to play Dr. Abhimanyu Birla. About her role, Rathod said "I relate to the character so much that I instantly fell in love with the way it has been written. Also, in real life, I'm free-spirited just like Akshara". Karishma Sawant was cast as Aarohi Goenka, making her acting debut. Mayank Arora and Sharan Anandani played Kairav Goenka and Vansh Goenka post the generation leap. Ami Trivedi was cast as Manjari Birla and Paras Priyadarshan as Neil Birla. Vinay Jain, Pragati Mehra and Ashish Nayyar were cast as Dr. Harshvardhan Birla, Dr. Mahima Birla and Dr. Anandvardhan Birla. Neeraj Goswami, Niharika Chouksey and Sehrish Ali were cast to play Parth Birla, Nishtha Birla and Shefali Birla. However Ali was replaced by actress Nisha Nagpal days after introduction of the third generation.

In February 2022, Kashish Rai joined the cast as Anand and Mahima's elder daughter Anisha Birla, and she quit the following month. But she returned and permanently left the series in August 2022 through her character's death.

In June 2022, Niharika Chouksey portraying Nishtha Birla quit the series quoting, "I waited for six months but there was nothing for me to do in the show". In August 2022, Mrunal Jain was cast to play Dr. Kunal Khera. Actress Navika Kotia, who previously played Prerna Singhania from 2013 to 2014 joined the cast again in August 2022 to play a new character Maya Khera.

In December 2022, Sharan Anandani playing Vansh Goenka quit the series and said, "My character never had any growth since long and was unhappy with tracks as I can't remain silent actor standing in background at this stage of my career". In the same month, Paras Priyadarshan who portrayed Neil Birla quit the series as "he didn't wanted to play role of a father owing to the following leap in the show". Jay Soni entered the show as Abhinav Sharma. Mayank Arora who portrayed Kairav Goenka quit the series as "he wished to explore more as an actor and felt that now he should bid adeau to Kairav". Following the pre-leap exists child actors Shreyansh Kaurav and Hera Mishra were cast to play Akshara's son Abhir Birla and Aarohi's daughter Ruhi Birla respectively for post-leap sequences in January 2023. In the same month actor Abeer Singh Godhwani replaced Mayank as Kairav Goenka while actress Shambhavi Singh was cast opposite him as Muskan.

In late February 2023 actress Saee Barve entered the series as Surekha Goenka which was previously played by actress Shilpa Raizada from 2016 to 2021.

Due to upcoming leap Karishma Sawant, Harshad Chopda and Shreyansh Kaurav portraying Aarohi, Abhimanyu and Abhir left the series in October 2023 with storyline showing their deaths while Pranali Rathod and Hera Mishra were replaced by Preeti Amin and Pratiksha Honmukhe as old Akshara and grown-up Ruhi respectively. However the former completed her part in December 2023 with storyline showcasing Akshara's death. Subsequently Samridhii Shukla and Shehzada Dhami were cast to play leads Abhira Sharma and Armaan Poddar. Shivam Khajuria too joined as Rohit Poddar opposite Honmukhe while Anita Raj, Shruti Ulfat and Sandeep Rajora were cast as Armaan's grandmother and parents respectively. Swati Chitnis who portrayed Suhasini Ajmera Goenka since 2016 too exited the series in same month after playing her role for seven years while whole cast of the Birla family too exited the series as leap continued with the Goenkas.

On 18 March 2024, producer Rajan Shahi announced the termination of Shehzada Dhami, who portrayed Armaan and Pratiksha Honmukhe, who portrayed Ruhi on the grounds of "unethical behaviour on sets". Dhami and Honmukhe were subsequently replaced by actors Rohit Purohit and Garvita Sadhwani respectively.

In July 2024, Shivam Khajuria who portrayed Rohit Poddar was replaced by Romiit Raaj, who was cast opposite Sadhwani for the second time after Rajan Shahi's Baatein Kuch Ankahee Si.

In November 2024, Mohit Parmar was finalised to replace child actor Shreyansh Kaurav for the role of adult Abhir, who was shown dead prior to the leap in November 2023. In January 2025, Siddharth Shivpuri entered as Advocate Roop Kumar aka RK while Vibhuti Thakur joined as Armaan's mother, Shivani Poddar.

In April 2025, Romiit Raaj and Vibhuti Thakur portraying Rohit and Shivani exited the series with storyline showing their deaths.

The show took another leap of seven years in May 2025. Child actor Urva Rumani was cast to play Abhira and Armaan's daughter Maira while Sachin Tyagi and Niyati Joshi portraying Manish and Swarna respectively quit the series after being part of it for nine and six years respectively along with Garvita Sadhwani and Saloni Sandhu portraying Ruhi and Armaan's cousin sister Charu respectively with storyline portraying Ruhi moving abroad with her son and rest of the Goenkas while Charu being shown dead. The leap also marked the entries of two cameos, Ruheen Ali Khan as Geetanjali and Rahul Sharma as Anshuman Raizada opposite Purohit and Shukla respectively while actress Charushree Singh entered as Anshuman's sister Tanya Raizada opposite Armaan's cousin Krish Bansal portrayed by Rishabh Jaiswal. Sharma and Khan completed their parts in August and October 2025 respectively with storyline showcasing deaths of both Anshuman and Geetanjali. In December 2025, Anju Jadhav entered to play a cameo Meher Mittal which also marked the entry of Abhira and Armaan's adopted daughter Mukti portrayed by child actor Mayanshi Verma.

The show took another leap of eight years in February 2026. Child actors Arshiya Sharma and Sarah Killedar replaced Rumani and Verma as teenaged Maira and Mukti respectively. With the leap Mohit Parmar and Sharon Verma portraying Abhir and Kiara exited the show with storyline showcasing them moving abroad with their child. In April 2026, Jadhav completed her part with storyline showing Meher's death while Rishabh Jaiswal portraying Krish also quit the show and was replaced by Aryan Arora.

In August 2026, it took another short leap of two years to show Abhira and Armaan's parenting challenges in their daughters' college lives where Aaditya Gupta got cast as Kabir Damani opposite Sharma who later quit the series after two weeks due to his personal reasons and got replaced by lead actor Rohit Purohit's former co-actor James Ghadge the same month while his former co-actress Aastha Chaudhary was cast to play Kabir's mother Nandini Damani and Kuldeep Singh as Kabir's father Raghav Damani. Aadesh Chaudhary got cast as Kabir's uncle Samar Damani while Neelu Vaghela as Kabir's grear-grandmother Bhairavi Devi Damani which was earlier going to be portrayed by Shagufta Ali.

=== Filming ===
The series is mainly filmed in Film City, Goregaon in Mumbai. As the story is based in Udaipur of Rajasthan, some scenes were filmed there. In December 2013, a sequence was shot at Wai. Sequences were also filmed in Rishikesh during 2016 and March 2018. In March 2017, the wedding track of Kartik and Naira was filmed in Bikaner, Rajasthan.

The show as also filmed in various foreign locations including Bangkok in 2014, Cape Town in 2015, Hong Kong in 2015, Switzerland in 2016 and Greece in 2017.

On 13 April 2021, Maharashtra's Chief Minister Uddhav Thackeray announced a sudden curfew due to increased COVID cases in Maharashtra, while the production halted from 14 April 2021. Production and filming location were soon shifted temporarily from Mumbai to Silvassa along with the shows Anupamaa, Aai Kuthe Kay Karte and Mann Kee Awaaz Pratigya 2 of the same production house. After two months of shooting in Silvassa, the team shifted back to Film City, Mumbai on 10 June 2021.

In October 2021, the team flew to Udaipur to shoot initial episodes after the generation leap including introduction sequences.

In April 2022 to May 2022, the team flew to Jaipur to shoot Abhimanyu and Akshara's wedding sequence.

From November 2023 to December 2023, the team shot the initial episodes of fourth generation in Mahabaleshwar, which was used as a dupe for Mussoorie.

=== Broadcast ===
The series which was in a continuous production since its premiere was halted indefinitely in March 2020. Owing COVID-19 outbreak in India, the filming of the television series and films were halted on 19 March 2020, expected to resume the works from 1 April 2020 and the series airing was halted on 25 March 2020 after the bank episodes got over. However, later on imposing the nationwide lockdown, which was extending with the increasing cases, filming could not be resumed since March end. After three months, the shooting of the series resumed on 26 June 2020 and airing resumed from 13 July 2020.

The production once again halted on 24 August 2020 when the cast Sachin Tyagi, Swati Chitnis and Samir Onkar along with four crew members were tested positive for the COVID-19 virus and resumed with others on 28 August 2020. Since 2 October 2022, it is broadcast daily along with other Star Plus's shows.

== Spin-off ==
In 2019, On Yeh Rishta Kya Kehlata Hai's completion of 10 years, a spin-off series, Yeh Rishtey Hain Pyaar Ke, premiered on 18 March 2019 starring Rhea Sharma and Shaheer Sheikh. The series portrayed the life of Naman and Karishma's daughter and Naira's younger step cousin Mishti, portrayed by Sharma alongside Abir portrayed by Sheikh.

== Crossovers ==
Yeh Rishta Kya Kehlata Hai has had several crossover episodes with various shows. They are as follows:

- On 28 December 2009, the show had a crossover with Sapna Babul Ka...Bidaai.
- On 24 August 2012, the show had a crossover episode with Diya Aur Baati Hum on the occasion of the completions of 1000 episodes and Naksh's first birthday.
- On 3 March 2016, actress Deepika Singh as Sandhya from Diya Aur Baati Hum made an entry during Naira's kidnap sequence.
- Yeh Rishta Kya Kehlata Hai and Yeh Rishtey Hain Pyaar Ke had an integration from 12 March 2019 to 16 March 2019. Rhea Sharma and Kaveri Priyam as grown-up versions of Mishti and Kuhu respectively introduced during the integration.
- From 26 March 2022 to 28 March 2022, Anupamaa from Anupamaa, attended Akshara and Abhimanyu's engagement.
- From 13 January 2024 to 15 January 2024, the show had a crossover with Baatein Kuch Ankahee Si, during Makar Sankranti celebration.
- On 19 August 2024, the show had another crossover with team Anupamaa on the occasion of Raksha Bandhan.

== Television specials ==
=== Rishton Ka Utsav (2018) ===
A special segment named Rishton Ka Utsav aired from 26 November 2018 to 5 December 2018 where Kartik and Naira organize a unique festival which brings all generations with most of the family members of the show through all these years come together and celebrate their reunion. This segment also marked the entry of Deblina Chatterjee as Gayatri Deora replacing Kanchi Singh who quit the show in 2017.

=== Ravivaar With Star Parivaar (2022) ===
The cast of Yeh Rishta Kya Kehlata Hai participated as a team in the musical game show Ravivaar With Star Parivaar. It competed with the teams of other Star Plus's shows. Yeh Rishta Kya Kehlata Hai emerged as the winner of the show winning the trophy and a prize money of 10 lac rupees.

== Reception ==
=== Critical reception ===
The Indian Express stated, "Simple story, simple treatment, easy pace, small tiffs, grouse, grief, happiness, sadness, celebrations, rituals, customs but no melodrama and no scheming and plotting....that's every day life beautifully captured and which pleases eyes, ears and other senses. Not that it has not resorted to TRP gimmicks like misunderstanding, pregnancy and miscarriage to come out of its lows, but the show has chronicled post-marriage journey of an arranged married couple quite well". They also quoted, "There is a sense of positivity and reality in the show, that no other serial offers on the small screen".

Praising the two shows Bidaii and Yeh Rishta Kya Kehlata Hai of Rajan Shahi's Director's Kut Production as game changers of Starplus which do not have excessive camera moves and mother-in-law-daughter-in-law melodramas unlike previously aired dramas, The Times of India stated, "The shows adequately highlighted the quintessential emotions with loads of romanticism and simplicity in story-telling".

Speaking on the success of the series, The New Indian Express said, "Like most successful television series in our country, "Yeh Rishta Kya Kehlata Hai" has always banked heavily on the great Indian family. However, the show, along with its cast, has changed over the decade, to accommodate changing times. Perhaps that is where the winning formula lies—in retaining its old core values in an ever-changing set-up".

== Impact ==
Shoma Munshi in her book Prime Time Soap Operas on Indian Television said the show has "simplicity and highly emotional content" and was noted for placing female characters in the historical tradition of a large joint family.

This Hindi soap opera is the longest-running Indian television soap opera. It was the first Hindi show to cross 2,500 episodes. It completed 3,000 episodes on 11 September 2019 creating a history in the Indian television. On 1 September 2021, It completed 3500 episodes. On 4 March 2023, it completed 4000 episodes successfully. The show completed 4500 episodes on 23rd May 2024. On 3rd December 2025, it completed 5000 episodes successfully.

Hina Khan participated in the 'Power of 49' campaign, in which soap opera actors used their influence to urge women to vote. Khan was paid with ₹1 to 1.25 Lacks per episode as of in 2015 and 2016 making her one of the highest paid Indian television actress.

In 2020, it became the third most tweeted Indian television show on Twitter.

== Awards ==
=== Indian Television Academy Awards ===
Year	Category	Recipient	Result	Ref.
2009	Best Actress - Popular	Hina Khan	Won	
2009	Best Actor -Popular	Karan Mehra	Won	
2009	Best Serial - Popular	Rajan Shahi	Won	
2009	Best Costumes	Ritu Deora	Won	
2010	Best Direction	Neeraj Baliyan	Won	
2010	ITA Scroll Honour	Yeh Rishta and Bidaai	Won	
2011	Best Direction'	Neeraj Baliyan	Won	
2011	GR8! Ensemblance Cast	Yeh Rishta Kya Kehlata Hai	Won	
2012	Best Direction	Neeraj Baliyan	Won	
2013	Best Actress in Supporting Role (Drama)	Sonali Verma	Won	
2013	Best Child Artist	Shivansh Kotia	Won	
2013	Best Music Composer	Naveen	Won	
2013	Best Dialogues	Raghuvir Shekhawat	Won	
2015	Best Actress Popular	Hina Khan	Won	
2015	Best Actor Popular	Karan Mehra	Won	
2015	Best Show Popular	Yeh Rishta Kya Kehlata Hai	Won	
2015	ITA scroll honor	Yeh Rishta Kya Kehlata Hai	Won	
2016	ITA scroll honor	Yeh Rishta Kya Kehlata Hai	Won	
2017	ITA Laurel For Longlasting Popularity	Yeh Rishta Kya Kehlata Hai	Won	
2019	Best Continuing Serial	Yeh Rishta Kya Kehlata Hai	Won	
2019	Best Actress Popular	Shivangi Joshi	Won	
2019	ITA Award for Longest Running Show	Yeh Rishta Kya Kehlata Hai	Won	
2020	ITA Award for Best Popular Show	Yeh Rishta Kya Kehlata Hai	Won	
2021	ITA Award for Longest Running Show	Yeh Rishta Kya Kehlata Hai	Won	
2021	Best Actor Popular	Harshad Chopda	Won	
2022	ITA Scroll of Honour	Yeh Rishta Kya Kehlata Hai	Won	
2022	Best Actor Popular	Harshad Chopda	Won	
2022	Best Actress Popular	Pranali Rathod	Won	
2023	ITA Scroll of Honour	Yeh Rishta Kya Kehlata Hai	Won	
2023	Best Actor Popular	Harshad Chopda	Won	
2024	ITA Scroll of Honour	Yeh Rishta Kya Kehlata Hai	Won	
2024	Best Actor Popular	Harshad Chopda	Won	
2024	Best Actress Popular	Pranali Rathod	Won	

=== Indian Telly Awards ===
Year	Category	Recipient	Result	Ref.
2009	Best Fresh Face (Popular)	Hina Khan	Won	
2009	Most Popular Ensemblance Cast	Yeh Rishta Kya Kehlata Hai	Won	
2009	Most Popular Drama Series	Rajan Shahi	Won	
2009	Best Costumes	Ritu Deora	Won	
2010	Most Popular Actress in a Lead Role	Hina Khan	Won	
2010	Best Actor in a Supporting Role – Drama (Jury)	Sanjeev Seth	Won	
2010	Most Popular Daily Series	Rajan Shahi	Won	
2010	Most Popular Ensemblance Cast	Yeh Rishta Kya Kehlata Hai	Won	
2010	Best Direction	Jai Kalra and Ram Panday	Won	
2012	Most Popular Continuing TV Series	Rajan Shahi	Won	
2012	Best Direction	Jai Kalra	Won	
2013	Best Onscreen Couple (Critics)	Hina Khan and Karan Mehra	Nominated	
2013	Best Actor in a Supporting Role – Drama (Critics)	Abhijeet Lahiri	Won	
2013	Best Television Show of the Year	Rajan Shahi	Won	
2013	Most Popular Show with Social Message	Rajan Shahi	Won	
2013	Most Popular Continuing TV Show	Rajan Shahi	Won	
2013	Most Popular Child Artist	Shivansh Kotia	Won	
2014	Most Popular Child Artist	Shivansh Kotia	Won	
2014	Most Popular Drama Series	Rajan Shahi	Won	
2014	Most Popular Continuing TV Programme	Rajan Shahi	Won	
2015	Best Ensemblance Cast	Yeh Rishta Kya Kehlata Hai	Won	
2019	Best Continuing TV programme (Jury)	Yeh Rishta Kya Kehlata Hai	Won	
2019	Best Actress in Supporting Role	Mohena Singh	Won	
2019	Best Actress in a Lead Role	Shivangi Joshi	Nominated	
2023	Best Actor In Leading Role Male (Popular)	Harshad Chopda	Won	
2023	Fan Favorite Jodi	Harshad Chopda and Pranali Rathod	Won	
2023	Best Continuing TV programme	Yeh Rishta Kya Kehlata Hai	Won	
2023	Best Production House	Rajan Shahi	Won	
2025	Fan Favorite Actor	Rohit Purohit	Won	
2025	Best Onscreen Couple	Samridhii Shukla and Rohit Purohit	Nominated	
2025	Fan Favorite Jodi	Samridhii Shukla and Rohit Purohit	Nominated	
2025	Editor's Choice – Rising Star	Samridhii Shukla	Won	
2025	Fan Favourite - Supporting Actress	Garvita Sadhwani	Won	
2025	Best Continuing TV Programme	Yeh Rishta Kya Kehlata Hai	Won	
2025	Daily Serial	Yeh Rishta Kya Kehlata Hai	Won	
2025	Best Ensemble Cast	Yeh Rishta Kya Kehlata Hai	Won	

=== Star Guild Awards ===
Year	Category	Recipient	Result	Ref.
2009	Best TV Storyline (Fiction)	Saba Mumtaz	Won	
2010	Best TV Programme of the Year	Rajan Shahi	Won	
2013	Best Direction	Jai Kalra and Ram Panday	Won	
2015	Best TV Storyline (Fiction)	Saba Mumtaz	Won	
2015	Best Ongoing TV Program of the Year	Rajan Shahi	Won	
2015	Best TV Actress	Hina Khan	Nominated	
2015	Best Writer	Bhavna Vyas and Munisha Rajpal	Won	
2016	Best Ongoing TV Program of the Year	Rajan Shahi	Won	

=== BIG Star Entertainment Awards ===
Year	Category	Recipient	Result	Ref.
2010	BIG Star Most Entertaining Fiction Show	Rajan Shahi	Won	
2013	BIG Star Most Entertaining TV Actor (Male)	Shivansh Kotia	Won	
2014	BIG Star Most Entertaining Fiction Show	Rajan Shahi	Won	

=== Gold Awards ===
Year	Category	Recipient	Result	Ref.
2015	Best Actress in a Lead Role - Jury	Hina Khan	Won	
2016	Best Onscreen Jodi	Karan Mehra and Hina Khan	Won	
2016	Debut in a Lead Role (Male)	Rohan Mehra	Won	
2017	Debut in a Lead Role (Female)	Shivangi Joshi	Won	
2017	Debut in a Lead Role (Male)	Mohsin Khan	Won	
2018	Best Show	Yeh Rishta Kya Kehata Hai	Won	
2018	Best Jodi	Shivangi Joshi and Mohsin Khan	Won	
2018	Best Supporting Actor	Vishal Singh	Won	
2018	Best Supporting Actress	Parul Chauhan	Won	
2019	Best Actress Female (Popular)	Shivangi Joshi	Won	
2019	Best Actor Male (Popular)	Mohsin Khan	Won	
2019	Best TV Show Fiction	Yeh Rishta Kya Kehlata Hai	Won	
2019	Longest Running Show	Yeh Rishta Kya Kehlata Hai	Won	

=== Iconic Gold Awards ===
Year	Category	Recipient	Result	Ref.
2021	Iconic Best Actress	Shivangi Joshi	Won	
2021	Iconic Best Show	Yeh Rishta Kya Kehlata Hai	Won	
2022	Iconic Most Popular TV Actress of the Year	Shivangi Joshi	Won	
2023	Iconic Most Popular TV Actor	Harshad Chopda	Won	

== See also ==
- List of programs broadcast by Star Plus
