= Samridhii Shukla =

Indian actress and voice-over artist (born 1995)

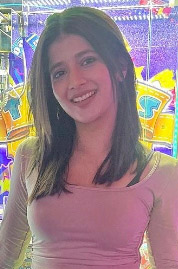
- Shukla in 2023
- Born: 14 November 1995 (age 30); Kanpur, Uttar Pradesh, India
- Occupations: Actress; dubbing Artist
- Years active: 2005–present
- Known for: Saavi Ki Savaari; Yeh Rishta Kya Kehlata Hai

Samridhii Shukla (born 14 November 1995) is an Indian actress and voice-over artist who primarily works in Hindi television. Known for lending her voice to Doraemon in Doraemon, she made her acting debut with her portrayal of Saavi Goyal Dalmiya in Saavi Ki Savaari. Shukla is best known for portraying Abhira Sharma Poddar in Yeh Rishta Kya Kehlata Hai. She is a recipient of an Indian Telly Award.

== Early life ==
Shukla was born on 14 November 1995 in a Hindu family in Kanpur. In an interview, she revealed that her father worked for All India Radio. Her grandmother and grandfather were freedom fighters, who later became an actor and a surgeon respectively while her great-grandfather served as an MLA from Kanpur.

== Career ==
=== Dubbing career ===
Shukla started her career as a voice over artist in 2005, when she dubbed for a part in the show Sai Baba. Following this, she dubbed for several other television shows. Her most notable work as a voice-over artist came with the animated series Doraemon, where she dubbed for the titular role of Doraemon. She also dubbed for the animated series Little Singham and Golmaal Jr..

Since 2016, Shukla has dubbed for films in several languages. Her most notable voice over in films include dubbing for Emma Watson in Beauty and the Beast, Jessica Henwick in The Matrix Resurrections, Taapsee Pannu in Haseen Dillruba, Alia Bhatt in Brahmāstra: Part One – Shiva, Triptii Dimri in Animal and Joey King in A Family Affair.

=== Expansion to acting career ===
Shukla made her screen debut in 2022 with Saavi Ki Savaari, where the titular role of Saavi Goyal Dalmiya, opposite Farman Haider. In the same year, she expanded to films with the Kannada film, Tajmahal 2 (credited as "Samruddhi Shukla"), where she played Spandana opposite Devarajkumar.

Since November 2023, Shukla is portraying leading role of Advocate Abhira Sharma Poddar in the longest running television show Yeh Rishta Kya Kehlata Hai, opposite Rohit Purohit. Her portrayal of Abhira received positive response from audiences and established her as one of the prominent faces of Hindi television. The role proved to be a breakthrough in her acting career, earning her several award nominations and wider recognition.

== Filmography ==
=== Films ===
Year	Title	Role	Notes	Ref.
2022	Tajmahal 2	Spandana	Kannada film	

=== Television ===
Year	Title	Role	Notes	Ref.
2022–2023	Saavi Ki Savaari	Saavi Goyal Dalmiya		
2023–present	Yeh Rishta Kya Kehlata Hai	Advocate Abhira Sharma Poddar		

==== Special appearances ====
Year	Title	Role	Ref.
2022	Parineetii	Saavi Goyal	
2023; 2024; 2026	Anupamaa	Advocate Abhira Sharma Poddar	
2024	Baatein Kuch Ankahee Si	Advocate Abhira Sharma Poddar	
2024	Yeh Teej Badi Hai Mast Mast	Advocate Abhira Sharma Poddar	
2024	Haathi Ghoda Paalki, Birthday Kanhaiya Lal Ki	Advocate Abhira Sharma Poddar	
2026	Udne Ki Aasha	Advocate Abhira Sharma Poddar	

== Dubbing roles ==
=== Animated series ===
Year	Title	Role	Language
2018	Little Singham	Ajay	Hindi
2019	Golmaal Jr.	Mili	Hindi
2019–2020	Mighty Little Bheem	Chhota Bheem	Hindi
2020	Doraemon	Doraemon	Hindi

=== Television ===
Year	Title	Actor	Character	Dub Language	Original language
2005	Sai Baba	Unknown	Child	Hindi	Hindi
2017	13 Reasons Why	Katherine Langford	Hannah Baker	Hindi	English
2016–2019	The Powerpuff Girls	—N/a	Blossom	Hindi	English
2016– 2025	Stranger Things	Millie Bobby Brown	Eleven / Jane Hopper ("El")	Hindi	English
2018–2019	Selection Day	Vipashyana Dubey	Zoya	English	Hindi
2019	Another Life	Chanelle Peloso	Petra Smith	Hindi	English
2020– Present	Bridgerton	Claudia Jessie	Eloise Bridgerton	Hindi	English
2021	Sweet Tooth	Stefania LaVie Owen	Bear	Hindi	English
2022	Yeh Kaali Kaali Ankhein	Shweta Tripathi	Shikha	English	Hindi
2024	Kota Factory Season 3	Revathi Pillai	Vartika Ratawal	English	Hindi

=== Films ===
Year	Title	Actor	Character	Dub Language	Original language
2016	Zootopia	Leah Latham	Fru Fru	Hindi	English
2017	The Return of Rebel 2	Hansika Motwani	Priya	Hindi	Telugu
2017	Kong: Skull Island	Jing Tian	San Lin	Hindi	English
2017	Beauty and the Beast	Emma Watson	Belle	Hindi	English
2017	Justice League	Amy Adams	Lois Lane	Hindi	English
2018	Mortal Engines	Hera Hilmar	Hester Shaw	Hindi	English
2018	Bumblebee	Hailee Steinfeld	Charlie Watson	Hindi	English
2018	Deadpool 2	Shioli Kutsuna	Yukio	Hindi	English
2019	Comali	Samyuktha Hegde	Nikitha Krishnamurthy	Hindi	Tamil
2020	Gunjan Saxena: The Kargil Girl	Janhvi Kapoor	Gunjan Saxena	English	Hindi
2020	Bulbbul	Tripti Dimri	Bulbbul	English	Hindi
2020	Raat Akeli Hai	Shweta Tripathi	Karuna Singh	English	Hindi
2020	Torbaaz	Nargis Fakhri	Ayesha	Hindi	Hindi
2020	V	Aditi Rao Hydari	Saheba	Hindi	Telugu
2020	The Kissing Booth 2	Joey King	Elle Evans	Hindi	English
2020	Project Power	Dominique Fishback	Robin Reilly	Hindi	English
2021	Asuran	Ammu Abhirami	Muniya (Mariyamma)	Hindi	Tamil
2021	Main Hoon Gambler	Genelia D'Souza	Janhvi (Gangana)	Hindi	Telugu
2021	The Matrix Resurrections	Jessica Henwick	Bugs	Hindi	English
2021	Shang-Chi	Meng'er Zhang	Xu Xialing	Hindi	English
2021	Ajeeb Daastaans	Nushrratt Bharuccha	Meenal	English	Hindi
2021	Haseen Dillruba	Taapsee Pannu	Rani Kashyap	English	Hindi
2021	Pagglait	Shruti Sharma	Nazia Zaidi	English	Hindi
2022	Jogi	Amyra Dastur	Kammo	English	Hindi
2022	Brahmāstra: Part One – Shiva	Alia Bhatt	Isha Chatterjee	English	Hindi
2023	Animal	Triptii Dimri	Zoya Riaz	English	Hindi
2024	A Family Affair	Joey King	Zara Ford	Hindi	English
2026	Maa Behen	Triptii Dimri	Jaya	English	Hindi

== Awards and nominations ==
Year	Award	Category	Work	Result	Ref
2024	Bollywood Hungama Style Icons	Most Stylish TV Actor of the Year – Female	N/A	Nominated	
2024	Indian Television Academy Awards	Best Actress - Popular	Yeh Rishta Kya Kehlata Hai	Nominated	
2025	Indian Telly Awards	Fan Favorite Actress	Yeh Rishta Kya Kehlata Hai	Nominated	
2025	Indian Telly Awards	Best Onscreen Couple (with Rohit Purohit)	Yeh Rishta Kya Kehlata Hai	Nominated	
2025	Indian Telly Awards	Fan Favorite Jodi (with Rohit Purohit)	Yeh Rishta Kya Kehlata Hai	Nominated	
2025	Indian Telly Awards	Editor's Choice: Rising Star	Yeh Rishta Kya Kehlata Hai	Won	
