= Riya Deepsi =

Indian actress

- Occupations: Actress, model
- Years active: 2012–present
- Known for: Playing 'Gandhari' in the television serial Mahabharat

Riya Deepsi is an Indian film and television actress and model. She debuted in 2013 with the television series Mahabharat. In 2018, she made her Hindi film debut with Bhaagte Raho.

== Career ==
In 2013, Deepsi made her TV debut with Mahabharat, where she portrayed blindfolded queen Gandhari. before Mahabharat she appeared on Mata Ki Chowki for an uncredited brief role.

After Mahabharat she appeared in Bharat Ka Veer Putra – Maharana Pratap, Razia Sultan and Begusarai for supporting roles. She has also participated in celebrity sports reality television show Box Cricket League.

From 2017 to 2018 she played as a parallel lead role of Princess Barsine, second wife of Alexander the Great in Porus.

In 2018, Deepsi made her Bollywood debut through Praful D.S. Tiwari's film, Bhaagte Raho, where she played the lead role of Gungun.

In 2019, she appeared in an episodic role of a YouTube web series Be Safe as Nidhi. In 2020, she appeared in a supporting role of Roma in ALTBalaji original web series It Happened in Calcutta.

== Filmography ==
=== Films ===
Year	Title	Role	Notes	Ref.
2012	Nanban	Air Hostess	Cameo	
2018	Bhaagte Raho	Gungun	Debut film as lead	

=== Television ===
Year	Title	Role	Notes	Ref.
2013–2014	Mahabharat	Gandhari		
2015	Bharat Ka Veer Putra – Maharana Pratap	Salima Sultan Begum		
2015	Razia Sultan	Fatima		
2016	Box Cricket League	Herself	Season 2	
2016	Begusarai	Sony Thakur		
2017–2018	Porus	Barsine		
2019	Box Cricket League	Herself	Season 4	
2021–2022	Tere Bina Jiya Jaye Na	Roma		
2025	Shiv Shakti – Tap Tyaag Tandav	Manasa		

=== Web series ===
Year	Title	Role	Ref.
2019	Be Safe	Nidhi	
2020	It Happened in Calcutta	Roma	
2022	Mombian	Gul	
