= Dhadkan Zindaggi Kii =

Indian medical drama

- Genre: Medical drama
- Created by: Nilanjana Purkayasstha
- Based on: Dhadkan
- Screenplay by: Shakti Sagar Chopra
- Story by: Lakshmi Jayakumar
- Directed by: Arif Ali
- Starring: See below
- Theme music composer: Nakash Aziz, Sargam Jassu
- Opening theme: Teri Dhadkan
- Composers: Nakash Aziz, Sargam Jassu
- Country of origin: India
- Original language: Hindi
- No. of seasons: 1
- No. of episodes: 75

Production
- Executive producer: Nilanjana Purkayasstha
- Producer: Herumb Khot
- Cinematography: Anil Katke, Aunil Jadhav
- Editor: Satya Sharma
- Camera setup: Multi-camera
- Running time: 40-47 minutes
- Production companies: Invictus T Mediaworks; Studio NEXT

Original release
- Network: Sony Entertainment Television; SonyLIV
- Release: 6 December 2021 – 4 March 2022

Related
- Dhadkan (TV series)

Dhadkan Zindaggi Kii (transl. HeartBeat Of Life) is an Indian medical drama television series that stars Additi Gupta, Rohit Purohit, Vidyut Xavier as the main protagonists with Alma Hussein, Nishant Singh, Raghav Dhirr, Kaushik Chakravorty and Ashwin Mushran as the supporting cast. The show aired from 6 December 2021 to 4 March 2022 on Sony Entertainment Television and was produced by Nilanjana Purkayasstha under Invictus T Mediaworks.

== Plot ==
Dr Deepika Sinha, a senior surgeon, takes on the role of Chief Resident at F.M.S. Hospital despite facing doubt from her family, coworkers and society. The audience follows her journey along with those of her junior residents Abhay, Sia, Piroz, and Wasim as they take on new challenges with each medical case they come across. Amidst their work new relationships form.

Abhay, nursing a complex resentment towards his father, aspires to become a Cardiothoracic surgeon. Sia, a lively heiress, dreams of becoming a plastic surgeon. Piroz, a medical prodigy yearning for companionship, has yet to decide on his specialization. Wasim, hailing from humble origins, seeks to dispel judgments quickly formed and dreams of establishing a clinic in his slum.

Amid the collaborative efforts of this diverse team, Dr. Sinha forges deep connections, especially with Abhay, who finds himself captivated by her. As the hospital establishes an Emergency department, Dr. Sinha is confronted with her past when her ex-fiancé, Dr. Vikrant Saxena, assumes the role of ER head. A tumultuous affair ensues, causing ripples of discomfort, especially for Aditi, Vikrant's wife.

Despite the emotional turmoil, Deepika navigates through the complexities of her personal and professional life. Aditi's tragic demise becomes a turning point, with Vikrant blaming Deepika and suffering from PTSD. A new friendship blossoms between Deepika and Nikhil Sardesai, a patient who aids in restoring her lost confidence. The duo's camaraderie evolves, leading Deepika to become the new ER head.

As relationships intertwine and evolve, Deepika decides to take a chance on love with Nikhil, juggling the delicate balance between work and personal life. Vikrant, burdened by guilt, eventually leaves his medical career. Abhay and Wasim embark on new paths, while Piroz finds love in Isha, a fellow resident. Sia discovers solace in Dr. Sameer Roy after failed relationships.

With the arrival of new residents and the recovery of Vikrant, the story unfolds with resilience and determination. Deepika, overcoming hurdles, efficiently manages the ER. Letting go of her past, she embraces a fresh start, culminating in a joyous union with Nikhil. Their marriage becomes a celebration of resilience, inspiring those around them to pursue and achieve their dreams. The show concludes with a jubilant dance, symbolizing triumph over challenges and the enduring spirit of pursuing one's aspirations.

== Cast ==
=== Main ===
- Additi Gupta as Dr. Deepika Sinha Sardesai: Senior surgeon; former chief resident and new ER head; Vikrant's ex-fianceé and love interest; Abhay's close friend and Nikhil's wife.
- Rohit Purohit as Dr. Vikrant Saxena: Senior surgeon and former ER head; Deepika's ex fiancé and love interest; Aditi's widower; Suman's brother
- Vidyut Xavier as Dr. Abhay Sathe: Surgeon and junior resident; Sia's ex-boyfriend; Deepika's unrequited lover.

=== Recurring ===
- Alma Hussein as Dr. Sia Advani: Surgeon and junior resident; Abhay and Wasim's ex-girlfriend; Sameer's girlfriend
- Raghav Dhirr as Dr. Piroz Murgiwala: Surgeon and junior resident; Isha's boyfriend; Meera's ex-boyfriend
- Nishant Singh as Dr. Wasim Ansari: Surgeon and junior resident; Sia's ex-boyfriend
- Sid Makkar as Nikhil Sardesai; a wealthy businessman; CEO of NSM (Nikhil Sardesai Meditech) and Deepika's husband.
- Meghna Kukreja as Dr. Isha Chakravorty: Surgeon and junior resident; PC's niece; Piroz's girlfriend
- Niranjan Namjoshi as Dr. Amin Ali: Senior surgeon
- Benaf Dadachandji as Dr. Aditi Saxena: Senior pathologist; Vikrant's late wife
- Kaushik Chakravorty as Dr. Pranav Chakravorty a.k.a. PC: Senior surgeon and Director of Medicine at FMS; Deepika's mentor; Isha's uncle.
- Ashwin Mushran as Jamshed Sheriar: Owner of FMS Hospital
- Krishna Shetty as Dr. Sameer Roy: Senior plastic surgeon and head of Plastic Surgery; Sia's boyfriend; Tania's uncle
- Mansi Patel as Nurse Madhavi: Head nurse
- Sanyogita Bhave as Girija Sathe: Abhay's mother; Vinayak's ex-wife
- Raja Sevak as Dr. Vinayak Paranspare: Senior cardio surgeon; Abhay's father; Girija's ex-husband
- Tanu Vidyarthi as Suman Saxena: Vikrant's sister
- Urmila Tiwari as Dr. Gayatri Singh: Senior gynaecologist
- Rajesh Kamboj as Dr. Khanna: Senior surgeon and head of General Surgery
- Smita Dongre as Dr. Namrata Sharma: Senior psychologist and head of Psychology Department
- Ssivanyi Thakor as Nurse Meena
- Devanggana Chauhan as Dr. Devangana Mishra: Senior surgeon and new chief resident; Deepika's college friend; Namit's ex-wife
- Vishesh Sharma as Dr. Veer Mehra: Surgeon and junior resident
- Kaajal Pattil as Dr. Divya Deshmukh: Ex-junior resident
- Unknown as Meera: Piroz's ex-girlfriend; Isha's friend
- Unknown as Namit: Devangana's ex-husband

== Episodes ==
No.	Title	Directed by	Original release date
1	"History"	Arif Ali	6 December 2021
Dr. Deepika Sinha sets off on a journey to pursue a successful career in the medical field ridden with patriarchy and to disprove the beliefs of her loved ones, colleagues, and society.
2	"Amputation"	Arif Ali	7 December 2021
On her first day at work, Deepika faces a tough situation as she has to amputate Razina's hand. However, Abhay and Jamshed oppose her decision.
3	"Diagnosis"	Arif Ali	8 December 2021
Deepika is in a dilemma when Razina threatens to commit suicide. On the other hand, Abhay uncovers information about Deepika's past.
4	"Prognosis"	Arif Ali	9 December 2021
Deepika risks her career to save Abhay's mother's life despite Abhay's plans to use her past against her. On the other hand, Jamshed calls a meeting to decide Deepika's future at the hospital.
5	"Perfect Storm"	Arif Ali	10 December 2021
Deepika is asked to handle the case of Sushil but she feels that she has missed something during diagnosis.
6	"Revival"	Arif Ali	13 December 2021
Later she seeks help from her team to take care of Sushil. Deepika struggles to cope with the loss of one of the twins, Sushil.
7	"God Complex"	Arif Ali	14 December 2021
After some time, Deepika asks her team members to diagnose Sunder.
8	"Emergency"	Arif Ali	15 December 2021
Deepika asks Abhay to perform a surgery on his own after much deliberation. On the other hand, Jamshed rejects Deepika's emergency room proposal.
9	"Crashing"	Arif Ali	16 December 2021
Deepika starts a signature campaign to get approval to start an emergency room at the hospital. However, she soon realizes that it is not so easy to bring about a change.
10	"Relapse"	Arif Ali	17 December 2021
Deepika and her team try their best to save lives under distress. In the meantime, the hospital is attacked by miscreants.
11	"Vulnerable"	Arif Ali	20 December 2021
Deepika is asked to lead the new emergency room by her manager. However, Jamshed suggests bringing in Dr. Vikrant Saxena for the new role.
12	"Immuno-Compromised"	Arif Ali	21 December 2021
Deepika is overwhelmed with work on the first day of the launch of her emergency room. However, she is left stunned when she sees Vikrant in the emergency room.
13	"Cytokine Storm"	Arif Ali	22 December 2021
The committee is forced to choose between Deepika and Vikrant for the emergency room. Meanwhile, Deepika works tirelessly to save patients.
14	"Infected"	Arif Ali	23 December 2021
Vikrant proves to be a thorn in Deepika's life as he constantly opposes her decisions. Meanwhile, Deepika tries her best to keep her calm.
15	"Deepika's Birthday"	Arif Ali	24 December 2021
Deepika races against time to diagnose a new illness that is spreading across the hospital. Meanwhile, Vikrant offers to befriend Deepika but he faces opposition from Dr. Abhay Sathe.
16	"No Cure For Love"	Arif Ali	27 December 2021
Abhay and Vikrant come up with a plan to wish Deepika on her birthday. Meanwhile, Abhay and Vikrant learned that Deepika has not spoken to her family for ten years.
17	"Moral Dilemma"	Arif Ali	28 December 2021
Madhavi informs Deepika and Vikrant about Nalini Gujral's case. In the meantime, Abhay decides to profess his love for Deepika through a message.
18	"Support System"	Arif Ali	29 December 2021
Abhay speaks with Siya's father and advises him to tell her the truth. In the meantime, Vikrant and Deepika share their opinions on the significance of having children.
19	"Engagement"	Arif Ali	30 December 2021
Deepika informs Ramesh that his kidney will have to be removed. Later, Ramesh requests Abhay and Sia to get engaged for his sake.
20	"Proxy Leader"	Arif Ali	31 December 2021
While Vikrant suggests that an operation take place, Deepika recommends tests. Later, Vikrant embraces Deepika, leaving Abhay shocked.
21	"Addiction"	Arif Ali	3 January 2022
An irritated Deepika tells Vikrant that she no longer loves him. Later, Vikrant injects a liquid into his body using a syringe.
22	"Over Dose"	Arif Ali	4 January 2022
Abhay meets Deepika and questions her about the missing drugs. In the meantime, Deepika suspects Vikrant of consuming drugs.
23	"Human Psychology"	Arif Ali	5 January 2022
Deepika is shocked when she finds Vikrant lying unconscious in the car. Later, she confronts Vikrant and questions him about his addiction.
24	"Head Trauma"	Arif Ali	6 January 2022
Deepika tries her best to convince Vikrant to stay away from the hospital. However, a visibly fuming Vikrant decides to take a drastic step.
25	"Detox"	Arif Ali	7 January 2022
Deepika tries her best to put some sense into Vikrant but to no avail. On the other hand, Ansari finds it difficult to handle the resident doctors.
26	"Track Record"	Arif Ali	10 January 2022
Vikrant is sent to the rehabilitation facility to get rid of his addiction. Later, Vikrant asks the attenders to allow him to call Deepika.
27	"Relinking"	Arif Ali	11 January 2022
Deepika is taken aback when she sees Vikrant in a miserable condition. On the other hand, Abhay is forced to perform a complicated procedure all by himself.
28	"A Matter Of The Heart"	Arif Ali	12 January 2022
Abhay takes Deepika by surprise when he confesses his feelings for her. At the emergency room, Ali asks the residents to handle three patients together.
29	"Toxic"	Arif Ali	13 January 2022
As a result of Vikrant's reckless behavior, Deepika falls into trouble. Elsewhere, Abhay tries to figure out the reason for Vikrant's addiction.
30	"Polyamory"	Arif Ali	14 January 2022
Vikrant lashes out at Abhay when he learns a shocking truth about him. Elsewhere, Deepika struggles to handle her emotions.
31	"Torment"	Arif Ali	17 January 2022
Vikrant Confronts Abhay and their confrontation lead to an ugly argument.
32	"Pain Killer"	Arif Ali	18 January 2022
Meanwhile, Deepika is left stunned when she sees Vikrant and Abhay fighting.
33	"Shock To The System"	Arif Ali	19 January 2022
An intoxicated Abhay decides to go to Deepika's house where he demands to know the truth about her relationship status with Vikrant.
34	"Denial"	Arif Ali	20 January 2022
Deepika's fleeting moments of happiness with Vikrant come to an end when his wife, Aditi, arrives in Mumbai to surprise him.
35	"Drowning"	Arif Ali	21 January 2022
Deepika however refuses to be the reason for Vikrant and Aditi's break-up. Later, Vikrant is shocked when Aditi does not acknowledge their marital issues.
36	"False Hope"	Arif Ali	24 January 2022
Deepika lashes out at Abhay when he asks her to eat something while Vikrant is away.
37	"Imbalance"	Arif Ali	25 January 2022
Meanwhile, Vikrant is shocked as his wife Aditi gets a job at Fardoon Mehrzad Sherrier (FMS) Hospital.
38	"Aggressive Approach"	Arif Ali	26 January 2022
Dr. Aditi attempts to force Deepika's patient into a clinical trial. Dr. Deepika stands up for her patient but Aditi ends up getting personal.
39	"Karma"	Arif Ali	27 January 2022
Aditi lashes out at Deepika when Vikrant supports Deepika's line of treatment.
40	"Personal Hell"	Arif Ali	28 January 2022
After some time, a visibly furious Vikrant decides to confront Aditi.
41	"Insecurity"	Arif Ali	31 January 2022
Suman lashes out at Deepika after Aditi sees her hugging Vikrant. Elsewhere, Abhay informs Vikrant about the incident involving Suman and Deepika.
42	"Troubled Waters"	Arif Ali	1 February 2022
Deepika breathes a sigh of relief when her mentor takes a stand for her. On the other hand, Aditi tries her best to keep Vikrant by her side while she is injured.
43	"Apnea"	Arif Ali	2 February 2022
Aditi pleads in front of Deepika and asks her to request Vikrant not to leave her. In the meantime, Deepika learns a shocking truth about Aditi and Vikrant's past.
44	"Skin-Deep"	Arif Ali	3 February 2022
Vikrant makes elaborate arrangements for his date with Deepika. Meanwhile, Abhay learns that Madhavi is a victim of domestic abuse.
45	"Weakness"	Arif Ali	4 February 2022
Vikrant loses his cool when Deepika calls off her relationship with him. In order to exact revenge on Deepika, Vikrant bans her from working in the emergency room.
46	"Underdog"	Arif Ali	7 February 2022
Deepika tries her best to convince the board members of Fardoon Mehrzad Sherrier (FMS) Hospital to let her hire some juniors.
47	"Mind Games"	Arif Ali	8 February 2022
However, Jamshed supports Vikrant and refuses to allow Deepika to hire new doctors.
48	"Safe Space"	Arif Ali	9 February 2022
When a photograph of Deepika and Abhay gets circulated, Deepika is asked to prove her innocence. Meanwhile, Vikrant asks Wasim to testify against Deepika.
49	"Underhanded"	Arif Ali	10 February 2022
Vikrant asks Wasim to convince Sia to testify against Deepika during her hearing. However, Sia reveals the truth in front of the board members.
50	"Evolution"	Arif Ali	11 February 2022
The nurses in Deepika's department support her when she stands up against Vikrant. After some time, Vikrant unleashes his fury on Aditi.
51	"Regrets"	Arif Ali	14 February 2022
Deepika is taken aback when she sees car crash victim Aditi in the emergency room.
52	"Flatlining"	Arif Ali	15 February 2022
After some time, Deepika decices to report the same to Vikrant. Meanwhile, Vikrant accuses Deepika for not saving Aditi.
53	"Reboot"	Arif Ali	16 February 2022
After Aditi's death, Vikrant struggles to come to terms with his guilt. On the other hand, Deepika gets an interesting patient to deal with.
54	"Self Doubt"	Arif Ali	17 February 2022
Vikrant coerces Deepika into questioning her own surgical skills. Meanwhile, Nikhil is left impressed by Deepika's intelligence and asks her to be his surgeon.
55	"Self Confidence"	Arif Ali	18 February 2022
Nikhil helps Deepika to realise that she was not wrong with her diagnosis. Meanwhile, Abhay supports Madhvi when she finally decides to take a stand against her husband.
56	"Jinxed"	Arif Ali	21 February 2022
57	"Delirium"	Arif Ali	21 February 2022
58	"Breakdown"	Arif Ali	22 February 2022
59	"PTSD"	Arif Ali	22 February 2022
60	"Hypertension"	Arif Ali	23 February 2022
61	"Reconstruction"	Arif Ali	23 February 2022
62	"Blunder"	Arif Ali	24 February 2022
63	"Saviour Complex"	Arif Ali	24 February 2022
64	"Ethereal"	Arif Ali	25 February 2022
65	"Promotion"	Arif Ali	25 February 2022
66	"Infusion"	Arif Ali	28 February 2022
67	"Advice"	Arif Ali	28 February 2022
68	"Side Effect"	Arif Ali	1 March 2022
69	"Pattern"	Arif Ali	1 March 2022
70	"Wilting"	Arif Ali	2 March 2022
71	"Detached"	Arif Ali	2 March 2022
72	"Transplant"	Arif Ali	3 March 2022
73	"Stress Test"	Arif Ali	3 March 2022
74	"Life Support"	Arif Ali	4 March 2022
75	"Future"	Arif Ali	4 March 2022
Deepika and Nikhil marry after a year long relationship while Wasim and Abhay are doing well in their careers. Piroz-Isha and Sia-Sameer are also happy together. Thus the show ends on a happy note.

== Production ==
=== Development ===
Dhadkan is a spin-off of the 2002 series of the same name. The series was initially planned with 65 episodes, but later was extended by ten more episodes, for a total of 75 episodes till 4 March.

=== Casting ===
Additi Gupta, Rohit Purohit and Vidyut Xavier were cast as the leads. In May 2021, Ashwin Mushran and Kaushik Chakravorty were confirmed to be cast in main roles. Later that month, Alma Hussein, Raghav Dhirr and Nishant Singh joined the cast.

During the latter part of the show, Meghna Kukreja, Sid Makkar and Krishna Shetty joined the show in pivotal roles.

=== Training ===
"It's intriguing and thrilling. When I started working on 'Dhadkan Zindaggi Kii', it was not easy, unlike some of my earlier shows here things have to be kept quite natural and subtle. It had to look like we're doctors and not actors who are playing the role of doctors. So, basically it was challenging, medical terms were difficult, also how dealing with a patient needs to look authentic was tough."

— Rohit Purohit

"It gives a lot of scope to experiment since it's an unconventional show. Plus, we are expected to do surgical procedures, learn the medical terms. The script is supervised by actual doctors, so it's hundred per cent authentic. It's challenging to make all of it a part of your act. But how boring it will be if there are no challenges? I'm loving every bit of it,"

— Niranjan Namjoshi

=== Filming ===
Principal photography commenced in June 2021 with the lead actors in Mumbai.

Lead actors Additi Gupta and Rohit Purohit announced the wrap up of "Dhadkan Zindaggi Kii" in Mumbai through an Instagram post on 1 February 2022.

=== Release ===
Dhadkan Zindaggi Kii was a long-awaited project on Sony Entertainment Television. The first promo of the show was unveiled on 11 November 2021, featuring the protagonists and revealing its release date. It started telecasting from 6 December 2021 at the 10:00 PM time-slot by replacing Kaun Banega Crorepati Season 13.

== Soundtrack ==
Dhadkan Zindaggi Kii

Soundtrack album by Sargam Jassu
- Released: 2022
- Recorded: 2021
- Genre: television series soundtrack
- Length: 1:30
- Label: Studio NEXT
- Producers: Nilanjana Purkayasstha, Herumb Khot

Track list

No.	Title	Singer(s)	Length
1.	"Teri Dhadkan" (Title Track)	Nakash Aziz	1:30
Total length:			1:30

== Reception ==
Dhadkan Zindaggi Kii received generally positive reviews from critics. Srividya Rajesh of IWM Buzz gave the show 4 out of 5 stars, praising the characters' backstories and the depiction of female doctors in a medical setting, though she questioned the hour-long duration of each episode. In a review of the first episode for Pinkvilla, Rasika Deshpande similarly felt that the show's strength was its focus on women's empowerment and applauded the performances of Gupta and Xavier. Telly Express described the show as a "natural and smooth drama" and gave it 4.3 out of 5 stars.

== Awards and nominations ==
Year	Award	Category	Recipient	Result	Ref.
2022	22nd Indian Television Academy Awards	Best Actress (Drama)	Additi Gupta	Nominated	
2022	22nd Indian Television Academy Awards	Best Actor (Drama)	Rohit Purohit	Nominated	
2022	22nd Indian Television Academy Awards	Best Actor (Drama)	Vidyut Xavier	Nominated	
2022	22nd Indian Television Academy Awards	Best Serial (Drama)	Nilanjana Purkayasstha	Won	

== See also ==
- List of programs broadcast by Sony Entertainment Television
