= Kis Desh Mein Hai Meraa Dil =

Indian television series

- Genre: Soap opera
- Created by: Ekta Kapoor
- Story by: Sonali Jaffar
- Directed by: Anil V. Kumar
- Creative directors: Nivedita Basu; Vikas Gupta; Ipshita Deb; Doris Dey; Pranshu Ghosh; Mansi Sawant; Doyel Som; Sanchi Bawa; Madhura Rapsang
- Starring: Additi Gupta; Harshad Chopda; Sushant Singh Rajput; Meher Vij
- Opening theme: Kis Desh Mein Hai Meraa Dil by Richa Sharma and Kailash Kher
- Country of origin: India
- Original language: Hindi
- No. of episodes: 444

Production
- Executive producer: Vikas Gupta
- Producers: Ekta Kapoor; Shobha Kapoor
- Cinematography: Suhas Shirodkar; Rajan Singh; Mahesh Thalakaad
- Editors: Vikas Sharma; Sandeep Bhatt; Vishwabandhu Giri
- Running time: 24 minutes
- Production company: Balaji Telefilms

Original release
- Network: StarPlus
- Release: March 3, 2008 – 5 February 2010

Kis Desh Mein Hai Meraa Dil (transl. In Which Country Does My Heart Live) is an Indian television drama series that aired on Star Plus. It starred Additi Gupta, Harshad Chopda, Sushant Singh Rajput and Meher Vij. It was produced by Ekta Kapoor and Shobha Kapoor under Balaji Telefilms.

== Plot ==
The story is of two lovers, Prem and Heer and their undying love for each other. Despite conspiracies, tragedies and heart-break, their undying love for each other prevails through the roughest of times. In parallel, the show also focuses on Prem and Heer's siblings Preet and Meher.

== Summary ==
=== Season 1 ===
Lalit Juneja and Balraj Maan are childhood friends who promise to marry their eldest children, Prem and Heer, when they grow up. However, Lalit moves his family to the United States, and years of zero contact lead to massive communication gaps. Believing Lalit has grown to despise his family and forgotten the promise, a heartbroken Balraj vows to marry Heer to someone else. Tragically, Heer's parents are soon killed in a bus accident. Seizing the opportunity to secure a wealthy future for her own daughter Ashlesha, Heer's scheming aunt Daljit lies to the returning Juneja family, claiming Heer's entire family perished in the crash. She then manipulates Lalit into arranging Prem's marriage to Ashlesha. Heer and her sister Meher move to the city to live with Daljit, who forces them into the servant quarters of the Juneja mansion. Unaware of their true identities, Prem and Heer fall in love at first sight. When their mutual affection is exposed right before Prem's wedding to Ashlesha, Daljit publicly humiliates Heer. Prem takes a stand, confesses his love, and abandons his family home and wealth to build a modest life with Heer. During a sudden natural disaster, Heer risks her life to save Lalit. Spotting a specific locket she wears, Lalit finally realizes she is his late best friend's daughter. He enthusiastically welcomes her into the family, and wedding preparations begin. However, their happiness is cut short when Prem is caught in a deadly terrorist attack during a business trip to Delhi and is presumed dead.

=== Season 2 ===
Devastated by Prem's death, his stepmother Gayatri falls into shock. Sensing weakness, a rival business tycoon, Rishab Rampal—who holds a deep, vengeful grudge against Prem over a past college incident—attempts a hostile takeover of the Juneja empire. To protect the family, Heer makes the ultimate sacrifice: she marries Rishab and falsely claims she only loved Prem for his money, drawing the bitter hatred of the Juneja family. Soon after, a man named Gaurav, who is an exact look-alike of Prem, enters their lives. Rishab has secretly hired Gaurav to infiltrate the household and mentally destroy the Junejas. Though Gaurav initially cruel to Heer, it is eventually revealed that he is actually a traumatized Prem who survived the explosion. Misled by doctors into believing he has a terminal heart condition, Prem was attempting to push his family away to spare them future grief. Once the medical misunderstanding is cleared up, Prem and Heer joyfully reunite. Their peace is shattered yet again by familial jealousy. Ashlesha, bitter after being rejected by Prem's brother, plots her revenge. Following a major misunderstanding where Prem falsely accuses Heer of cheating with an old friend, Ashlesha stages a deceptive scene to make it appear she slept with a heavily intoxicated Prem. Devastated by the apparent betrayal, Heer flees the household, separating the couple for six years. Unbeknownst to Prem, Heer goes into hiding and gives birth to their daughter, Chahat.

== Cast ==
=== Main ===
- Additi Gupta as Heer Maan Juneja: Teji and Balraj's elder daughter; Meher and Nihaal's sister; Prem's wife; Chahat's mother (2008–2010)
- Harshad Chopda as Prem Juneja: Lalit and Rasika's son; Gayatri's step-son; Kulraj's brother; Preet, Harman and Veera's half-brother; Heer's husband; Chahat's father (2008–2010)
- Sushant Singh Rajput as Preet Juneja: Lalit and Gayatri's elder son; Prem's half-brother; Harman and Veera's brother; Varun's cousin; Meher's husband (2008–2009)
- Meher Vij as Meher Maan Juneja: Balraj and Teji's daughter; Heer and Nihaal's sister; Harman's ex-fiancé; Preet's wife (2008—2010)

=== Recurring ===
- Varun Kapoor as Varun Gangotre: Shubhi's son; Prem, Preet, Harman and Veera's cousin
- Virendra Saxena as Balraj Maan: Balwant's brother; Lalit's best friend; Teji's husband; Heer, Meher and Nihaal's father
- Sadhana Singh as Tejassi "Teji" Maan: Balraj's wife; Heer, Meher and Nihaal's mother
- Mahesh Shetty as Nihaal Maan: Balraj and Teji's son; Heer and Meher's brother; Veera's husband
- Krystle D'Souza as Veera Juneja Maan: Lalit and Gayatri's daughter; Preet and Harman's sister; Prem's half-sister; Nihaal's wife
- Deepak Qazir as Lalit Juneja: Balraj's best friend; Shubhi's brother; Rasika's widower; Gayatri's husband; Kulraj, Prem, Preet, Harman and Veera's father
- Shama Deshpande as Gayatri Juneja: Lalit's second wife; Prem and Kulraj's step-mother; Preet, Harman and Veera's mother
- Manoj Chandila / Tabrez Khan as Harman Juneja: Lalit and Gayatri's younger son; Preet and Veera's brother; Prem's half-brother; Maya's husband; Meher's ex-fiancé
- Madhura Naik as Maya Juneja: Harman's wife
- Nidhi Tikoo as Kulraj Gupta: Lalit and Rasika's daughter; Gayatri's step daughter; Prem's sister; Preet, Harman and Veera's step sister; Kiran's wife
- Manav Vij as Kiran Gupta: Kulraj's husband
- Ranjeev Verma as Balwant Maan: Balraj's brother; Daljeet's husband; Ashlesha's father
- Tasneem Sheikh as Daljeet Maan: Balwant's wife; Ashlesha's mother
- Mihika Verma as Ashlesha Maan: Balwant and Daljeet's daughter; Preet and Prem's ex-fiancé
- Muskaan Uppal as Chahat Juneja: Prem and Heer's daughter
- Jai Kalra as Rishabh Rampal
- Apara Mehta as Bharti Rampal
- Vishal Thakkar / Dev Keswani as Dheer
- Dimple Jhangiani as Sanjana Rampaal
- Avinash Sachdev as Prashant Chhabria / Manmeet
- Harsh Somaiya as Ketan Gupta
- Simran Khanna as Geet
- Rachana Parulkar as Rano
- Sudha Chandran as Inspector Sagarika Solanki
- Anita Hassanandani as Shruti
- Puja Banerjee as Vrinda
- Hina Khan as Akshara
- Parul Chauhan as Ragini
- Anjali Abrol as Rani
- Pooja Gor as Pratigya

== Production ==
Initially titled as Khandaan, it was later renamed as Kis Desh Mein Hai Meraa Dil before premiere. Sushant Singh Rajput playing Preet Singh Juneja was killed in a sequence. However, on viewers demand, during the finale of the series, he returned as a spirit.

Speaking about the series, producer Ekta Kapoor said, "I would love to describe this as an ethereal story from the heart. This show is bound to ignite the magic of love and romance on television once again."

In March 2009, the series was given a warning from the channel for its non satisfactory ratings to improve.

In November 2008, the shootings and telecast of all the Hindi television series including this series and films were stalled on 8 November 2008 due to dispute by the technician workers of FWICE (Federation of Western India Cine Employees) for increasing the wages, better work conditions and more breaks between shootings. FWICE first took a strike on 1 October 2008 when they addressed their problems with the producers and production was stalled. A contract was signed after four days discussions and shooting were happening only for two hours content in a day then after which differences increased between them while channels gave them time until 30 October 2008 to sort it out. Failing to do so lead to protests again from 10 November 2008 to 19 November 2008 during which channels blacked out new broadcasts and repeat telecasts were shown from 10 November 2008. On 19 November 2008, the strike was called off after settling the disputes and the production resumed. The new episodes started to telecast from 1 December 2008.

== Awards and nominations ==
Year	Award	Category	Nominee	Result	Reference
2008	Indian Telly Awards	Fan Favorite Actor	Harshad Chopda	Nominated	
2008	Indian Telly Awards	Fan Favorite Actress	Additi Gupta	Nominated	
2008	Indian Telly Awards	Best Fresh New Face (Actress)	Additi Gupta	Nominated	
2008	Indian Telly Awards	Best Fresh New Face (Actor)	Sushant Singh Rajput	Nominated	
2008	Indian Television Academy Awards	Best Actor Drama Popular	Harshad Chopda	Nominated	
2008	Indian Television Academy Awards	Best Actress Drama Popular	Additi Gupta	Nominated	
2008	Gold Awards	Best Actor in a Lead Role	Harshad Chopda	Nominated	
2008	Gold Awards	Best Actress in a Lead Role	Additi Gupta	Nominated	
2008	Gold Awards	Debut in a Lead Role (Female)	Additi Gupta	Nominated	
