= Bhaskar Bharti =

Television series

- Genre: Fantasy comedy
- Directed by: Pavan Kaul; Manoj Kotian
- Starring: Ragini Khanna; Anchal Sabharwal; Aamir Ali; Vivek Mushran; Jai Kalra; Rukhsar Rehman; Rajesh Khera; Eijaz Khan
- Country of origin: India
- Original language: Hindi
- No. of seasons: 1
- No. of episodes: 120

Production
- Producers: Deeya Singh; Tony Singh
- Running time: 24 minutes
- Production company: DJ's a Creative Unit

Original release
- Network: Sony Entertainment Television
- Release: 25 May – 17 December 2009

Bhaskar Bharti is an Indian fantasy comedy-drama television series that premiered from 25 May 2009 on Sony Entertainment Television. Produced by Deeya Singh and Tony Singh under DJ's a Creative Unit, it stars Ragini Khanna, Anchal Sabharwal, Aamir Ali, Jai Kalra, Rukhsar Rehman, Vivek Mushran and Eijaz Khan. The story is about a man named Bhaskar Bharti, who is turned into a woman. As a woman, "she" goes by the name Bharti Bhaskar. It went off air on 17 December 2009.

Prior to its launch, it was believed that Bhaskar Bharti was a TV adaptation of the 2005 Hindi film Mr Ya Miss. However, that was not the case, as it is actually a Hindi adaptation of the Argentine comedy show Lalola in which a man turns into a woman as a result of being cursed by one of his love interests.

== Plot ==
Bhaskar is an attractive and debonair man who serves as the chief editor of Men's Universe (MU), a fledgling men's magazine based in Mumbai. He's quite popular among women; however, he keeps moving in and out of relationships, as he doesn't believe in the concept of love. Eventually, his scorned ex-girlfriend Gita curses him to endure the pain of women. The curse comes true, and Bhaskar transforms into a woman that night. Bewildered by the transformation, Bhaskar confides in his friend Payal. To keep his job, he assumes the identity of his own fictional cousin, Bharti. Bharti impresses the new investor Raichura with a presentation and secures the position of chief editor. Despite facing harassment from Raichura, Bharti's resilience prevails, overcoming attempts to tarnish her image. Gradually, CEO Amarjeet also acknowledges Bharti's potential.

At work, Bharti faces constant workplace harassment, particularly from jealous colleagues Gyaan and Vineeta, who have allied with Raichura. However, he finds an ally in the compassionate photographer Armaan, who frequently comes to Bharti's rescue. In an attempt to revert back to Bhaskar, Bharti and Payal meet Chakrapani Baba, only to soon discover that he is a fraud. Bharti meets the mysterious KK, who reveals he is responsible for Bhaskar's transformation into a woman, which temporarily reverts when KK is around. KK explains that for the curse to be lifted, Bhaskar must experience and understand the pain of every woman.

At work, Bharti's adamant nature often leads her to disrupt work and inadvertently hurt people's feelings, but Armaan is always there to console her. As they grow closer, Bharti struggles to accept her growing feelings for Armaan and his daughter Jia, as she is actually Bhaskar. Payal, who has long adored Bhaskar, feels helpless seeing Bharti fall for Armaan. Gyaan and Raichura's schemes frequently land Bharti in humorous predicaments, leading to outbursts towards Armaan, though their conflicts only bring them closer together.

KK sets Bharti a series of challenges to understand womanhood, informing her that if she completes them, she would revert back to Bhaskar. However, she initially fails due to overconfidence. Driven by her dream to buy a Haveli in Gwalior for her father Laxminarayan, who doubted her abilities, Bharti works tirelessly despite opposition from Gyaan and Raichura. When Bhaskar's family visits, including his parents and cousin Nanhe, Bharti lies that she is Bhaskar's wife, leading to confusion at MU after Nanhe unwittingly reveals this to Anu, Amarjeet's spoiled daughter who harbors animosity towards Bharti due to her popularity at the office.

Eventually, Bharti and Armaan resolve the situation and expose Anu's antics, resulting in Anu getting fired. At home, she endures Laxminarayan's chauvinistic behavior until she proves her worth with support from her mother and Payal. Bharti buys the Haveli, which brings joy to her parents, but she is heartbroken at being unable to present it as Bhaskar. During Krishna Janmashtami, KK reveals himself as Lord Krishna and, despite Bhaskar's pleas, refuses to revert his transformation, as he observes that Bhaskar still hasn't shed some of his careless attitude. Meanwhile, a crisis arises when gangster Vasooli kidnaps Jia due to Bharti owing him money, further straining her relationship with Armaan after a rescue mission.

Due to various confusions, Bhaskar is compelled to appear. KK then presents Bharti with a chance to bring Bhaskar back without reverting her transformation. He accomplishes this by transforming himself into Bhaskar. However, he conditions this upon Bharti revealing her true identity to her parents.Bharti tries about to reveal the truth but backs out at the last minute, opting to lie about being divorced instead. KK's response to Bharti's lie is to make her life more complicated, leading to a chain of events orchestrated by him. Shocked by her divorce revelation, Laxminarayan disowns Bhaskar for abandoning Bharti, now having accepted her as his daughter. This was planned by KK as a punishment plan for Bharti's deception.

When framed for embezzlement by Gyaan and Raichura, Bharti flees but is found by a sadhu who reveals she must attain complete womanhood to break the curse. Amarjeet catches Raichura discussing their plot against Bharti before eventually firing him. He then brings in the misogynistic Omkar as the new investor. Meanwhile, Armaan rescues Bharti and proposes to her, which she accepts, realizing that marriage could be her ticket back to being Bhaskar

Omkar, who is the estranged older brother of Armaan reunites with him. He discovers during Armaan's wedding that Bharti resembles his own missing wife, Bharti Sinha, who mysteriously vanished 6 months prior. He halts the wedding and forcibly marries Bharti, despite her protests of not knowing him. In Omkar's patriarchal household, Bharti faces cruelty from Omkar and his family. Radha, Omkar's sister-in-law who faces similar treatment, provides comfort to the oppressed Bharti. Armaan feels helpless witnessing Bharti's mistreatment. Meanwhile, Radha is often berated by her in-laws for her inability to conceive. Her cruel mother-in-law even goes so far as to arrange for her to be nearly assaulted by a fake tantric, who claims to resolve her fertility issues. Eventually, Armaan and Bharti expose Radha's mother-in-law's actions, bringing justice to Radha. Bharti humiliates Omkar and reunites with her friend Payal after a long separation. Bharti overhears Payal and Armaan talking about how much she loves Bhaskar. Repentant for not sensing Payal's emotions earlier, Bharti (as Bhaskar) begs for forgiveness.

Bharti becomes aware of how much she has changed since her transformation and aspires to always be a woman when she and Armaan hear Jia's speech at school in which Jia professes her respect for Bharti. However, KK informs her that she will change back into Bhaskar after succeeding over all challenges. To Payal's surprise, Bharti indeed transforms back into Bhaskar the next day. As Bharti, Bhaskar writes a heartbreaking farewell letter to Armaan, claiming that she has run away due to Omkar's abusive behavior.

A changed Bhaskar returns to office after his long absence, much to everyone's joy and surprise. He vows to put in more effort and improve his understanding of everyone around him. Bhaskar notices Armaan feeling low and offers him comfort. To Armaan's astonishment, the real Bharti shows up, and they are reunited, while Bhaskar and Payal, who are now a couple, embrace as they prepare to travel to Gwalior.

== Cast ==
=== Main cast ===
- Ragini Khanna as Bhaskar Bharti, mainly known as Bharti Bhaskar, Bhaskar's female Avatar, who is continuously trapped in problems and solves them.
- Anchal Sabharwal as Payal Mehra, She is Bhaskar's best friend, who loves him and wants him back in his original self. She is constantly with him through this tumultuous phase of his life, and helps him in dealing with his new body and new personal and professional life. She works in a Radio Station.
- Aamir Ali as Armaan Sinha, Bhaskar's office colleague. He is in love with Bharti, The female version of Bhaskar. He is a divorcé with a young daughter, and is shown as a good and kind person by heart.
- Eijaz Khan as Bhaskar, He originally stars as a guest and makes small appearances in some episodes. He is the chief editor of Men's Universe magazine, and hails originally from Gwalior, a playboy man.

=== Recurring cast ===
- Vivek Mushran as Amarjeet Chaddha, Bhaskar (Bharti)'s boss. He is initially biased against Bharti and doubts her capabilities, but is gradually forced to accept her contributions towards the magazine's success.
- Jai Kalra as Gyaan Gupta, Bhaskar's office colleague and supposed best friend. Gyaan, however, is very jealous of Both Bharti and Bhaskar but is in an open fight with Bharti. He and Vineeta try often to get her thrown out of her job, but without result.
- Rukhsar Rehman as Vineeta Lamba, Gyaan's subordinate in office and also his love interest. She conspires with Gyaan to have Bharti thrown out from the magazine, so he can assume Bhaskar's post and she can be promoted to his current post.
- Rajesh Khera as KK, the mysterious man who is responsible for Bhaskar's transformation into Bharti. He is later revealed to be none other than Lord Krishna (KK apparently being short for "Krishna Kanhaiya"). Bhaskar is seen in his male form only when KK is with him.
- Mohit Daga as Nanhe
- Vaishnavi as Bhaskar's mother
- Lalit Parimoo as Bhaskar's father

=== Guest cast ===
- Preeti Amin as Geeta, A simple Girl. Bhaskar promised to marry her but left her at last moment. In anger she asked God to teach Bhaskar the respect of women, Resulting in his transformation from a man to a woman.
- Shakti Anand as Omkar Sinha, Armaan's Elder brother. He claims that he is Bharti's husband.
- Kurush Deboo as Dr. Vibhushan Nath Chakrapani Baba. A spiritual con baba dupes Bharti with a false claim to make her Bhaskar (the male) again with the help of his chemicals and holy mantras book.
- Kanika Kohli as Armaan's Ex-Wife
