= Malik Altunia =

Ikhtiayar-ud-din Altunia
- Mirza

Governor of Bathinda
- Born: 1202–1204; Bathinda, Punjab
- Died: 13 October 1240; Delhi, Delhi Sultanate
- Spouse: Razia Sultan
- Religion: Sunni Islam

Malik Ikhtiyar-ud-din Altunia was the governor of Bathinda in (Punjab) under the rule of the Delhi Sultanate under the Mamluk dynasty. He was the husband of Razia Sultan.

== Biography ==
Ikhtiyaruddin Altunia was a Turkic slave purchased by Iltutmish. Razia Sultan bestowed favors upon him by assigning him first the iqta of Baran and then the iqta of Tabarhinda. However, he conspired with other Turkic officers to overthrow her while she was away on the Lahore campaign. When Razia arrived in Delhi on 3 April 1240, she learned that Altunia had rebelled against her in Tabarhinda. Unaware that other nobles in Delhi had joined Altunia in conspiring against her, Razia marched toward Tabarhinda ten days later. At Tabarhinda, the rebel forces killed her loyalist Yaqut and imprisoned her.

When the news of Razia's arrest reached Delhi, the rebel nobles there appointed Muizuddin Bahram – a son of Iltutmish – on the throne. He formally ascended the throne on 21 April 1240, and the nobles pledged allegiance to him on 5 May 1240. The nobles expected the new king to be a figurehead, and intended to control the affairs of the state through the newly created office of naib-i mamlakat (equivalent to regent), which was assigned to Ikhtiyaruddin Aitigin. However, the new king had Ikhtiyaruddin Aitigin assassinated within 1–2 months.

After deposing Razia, the nobles at Delhi had distributed important offices and iqtas among themselves, ignoring claims of Ikhtiyaruddin Altunia, who had arrested Razia at Tabarhinda. After Aitigin's death, Altunia lost all hope of realizing any benefits from Razia's overthrow, and decided to ally with her. Razia also saw this as an opportunity to win back the throne, and married Altunia in September 1240. The two were supported by some other disgruntled Turkic nobles, including Malik Qaraqash and Malik Salari.

Altunia assembled an army, which according to Abdul Malik Isami, included Khokhars, Jats, and Rajputs. In September–October 1240, Sultan Muizuddin Bahram led an army against the forces of Altunia and Razia, and defeated them on 14 October 1240. Altunia and Razia were forced to retreat to Kaithal, where they were deserted by their soldiers, and were killed by a group of Shia muslims. Razia was killed on 15 October 1240.

== In popular culture ==
Altunia has been portrayed several times in Indian films (focusing on Razia Sultan), including by Paidi Jairaj in Razia Sultana (1961), Vijayendra Ghatge in Razia Sultan (1983).

In 2015, &TV started airing a TV series on the life of Razia Sultan, starring Rohit Purohit as Malik Altunia which highlighted both, her tough journey towards becoming a Sultan and her much spoken about passionate love life with Altunia.

== Sources ==
- Lyons, Mathew (2022). "Death of Sultan Razia". History Today. 72 (10): 26.
- K. A. Nizami (1992). "The Early Turkish Sultans of Delhi". In Mohammad Habib; Khaliq Ahmad Nizami (eds.). A Comprehensive History of India: The Delhi Sultanat (A.D. 1206-1526). Vol. 5 (Second ed.). The Indian History Congress / People's Publishing House. OCLC 31870180.
