= Anchal Sabharwal =

Indian actress and model

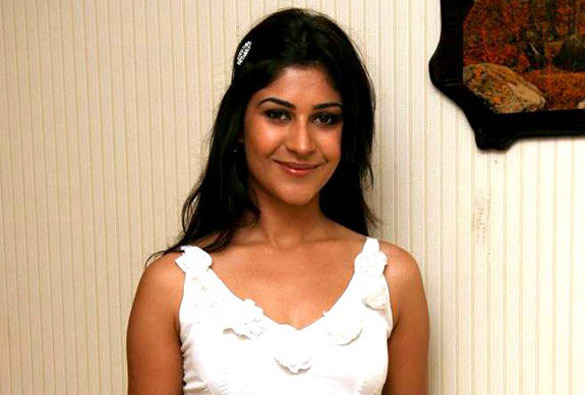
- Born: Delhi, India
- Other names: Aanchal, Sobhana
- Occupations: Actress, model
- Years active: 2006–present

Anchal Sabharwal is a film actress and model, who has appeared in Hindi television series and regional feature films.

== Career ==
Anchal first appeared in many TV commercials and then in few Hindi television series. Her first film was in Telugu, Masth. She appeared in Hindi film Aamras which is the directorial debut of Rupali Guha. She made her debut in Kannda in 2011 and played a supporting role in Kempe Gowda. She was first supposed to play the lead role in the film. She replaced Mugdha Chaphekar as Aarti Jhaveri in the sitcom Sajan Re Jhoot Mat Bolo.

== Filmography ==
=== Films ===
Year	Film	Role	Language	Notes
2009	Aamras	Sanya Balsara	Hindi	
2011	The Train	Meera	Malayalam	

=== Television ===
Year	Show	Role
2006–2008	Aek Chabhi Hai Padoss Mein	Zoya Ali
2009	Bhaskar Bharti	Payal Mehra
2011–2012	Sajan Re Jhoot Mat Bolo	Aarti Jhaveri
2011	Saas Bina Sasural	Damini
2013	Welcome - Baazi Mehmaan-Nawaazi ki	Contestant
2014	Uttaran	Fida
2014	Iss Pyaar Ko Kya Naam Doon? Ek Baar Phir	Mansi
2016	Tamanna	Lavanya
2025	Bade Achhe Lagte Hain 4	Nitya
