= Mahima Shani Dev Ki =

Indian mythological television series

- Genre: Mythology
- Based on: Shani Mahatmya
- Screenplay by: C L Saini
- Story by: Ram Govind
- Directed by: Prem Sagar
- Starring: See below
- Theme music composer: Surya Raajkamal; Vinay Raajkamal
- Opening theme: Jai Jai Jai Shani Dev
- Country of origin: India
- Original language: Hindi
- No. of seasons: 1
- No. of episodes: 235

Production
- Producers: Subhash Sagar; Anand Sagar
- Production locations: Mumbai, Maharashtra, India
- Cinematography: Ajay Chauhan
- Editors: Shamsh Mirza; Abhay Singh
- Running time: 45 minutes
- Production company: Sagar Arts

Original release
- Network: Imagine TV
- Release: 26 July 2008 – 2009

Mahima Shani Dev Ki (transl. The glory of lord Shani) is an Indian Hindi-language Hindu mythological television series that was premiered on 26 July 2008 on Imagine TV.

== Cast ==
- Daya Shankar Pandey as Shanidev
- Soumik Rao as Vikramaditya: Maharaj of Ujjayini
- Namrata Thapa as Madanalekha: Maharani of Ujjayini, wife of Vikramaditya
- Nitin Prabhat as Adityavardhan: Rajkumar of Ujjayini; son of Vikramaditya
- Bhupinder Singh Bhupi as General Secretary Karang
- Kailash Kaushik as Varaha Mihir
- Yash Dasgupta as Demon Kalketu
- Sandeep Mohan as Andhra Naresh
- Kanu Patel as Shani Worshiper, Upasak
- Dev Joshi as Madhav, Young Shukra
- Anwar Fatehan as Raja Chandrasen
- Ayam Mehta as Kaka Maharaj, Vikramaditya's brother
- Ravi Jhankal as Shani Worshiper
- Amit Pachori as Mahadev, Jungalia
- Ravi Gossain as Rishi Maandukya
- Amit Dolawat as Giridhar
- Aditi Sajwan as Maanvi
- Rohit Purohit as Vikram, Dushyanta
- Aastha Chaudhary as Vaijayanti, Shakuntala

== Broadcast ==
In India the series was originally broadcast on Imagine TV. The show was re-aired on Dangal. During its rerun in COVID-19 lockdown in India in Week 27 it became the 4th most watched Indian TV show.

The show was also dubbed in Kannada language as Shani Ninna Mahime, and aired on Dum TV Kannada. While the entire episodes of the show is also available on Dangal Play app. It was also Dubbed In Bengali Language as Jai Jai Shani Dev and aired on Enterr10 Bangla.

== See also ==
- List of programs broadcast by Imagine TV
- List of programmes broadcast by Dangal TV
- Karmaphal Daata Shani
- Karmadhikari Shanidev
