= Jai Kalra =

Indian actor

- Occupation: Actor
- Years active: 2005–2015

Jai Kalra is an Indian actor who has appeared in Bollywood films and Indian television dramas. He is popularly known for playing the role of Vikram Shergill in Bade Achhe Lagte Hain.

== Career ==
Kalra entered Bollywood playing a role in the movie Page 3, directed by Madhur Bhandarkar The movie won a National Award.

Kalra also played a role in the movie Shagird (2011 film) directed by Tigmanshu Dhulia and Rajshri Productions 2011 film Love U...Mr.Kalakaar!

Kalra started his television career with Ekta Kapoor's Kis Desh Mein Hai Meraa Dil on STAR Plus, a show aired from 2008-09 for which he won the Best Actor in the negative role.

Kalra also appeared in Sony TV's show Bhaskar Bharti which started in May 2009 and ended in December 2009. He is most popular for Balaji Telefilms show Bade Achhe Lagte Hain, which started in May 2011 and ended in July 2014. Kalra's performance in the show won him appreciation globally. He received many nomination and adulation for the portrayal of Vikram Shergill in the show.

Kalra was last seen as a lead protagonist in Life OK's Laut Aao Trisha in lead role with actress Bhagyashree Patwardhan.

== Television shows ==
Year	Shows	Role
2008-09	Kis Desh Mein Hai Meraa Dil	Rishab Rampal(antagonist)
2009	Bhaskar Bharti	Gyaan Gupta
2011-2014	Bade Achhe Lagte Hain	Vikram Shergil (supportive positive role)
2014-2015	Laut Aao Trisha	Prateek Swaika (lead role)
