= Gold Award for Debut in a Lead Role (Female) =

Annual Indian television awards

Gold Award for Best Debut in a Lead Role (Female)
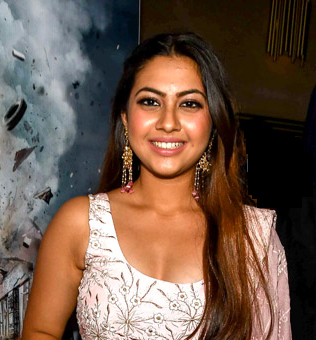
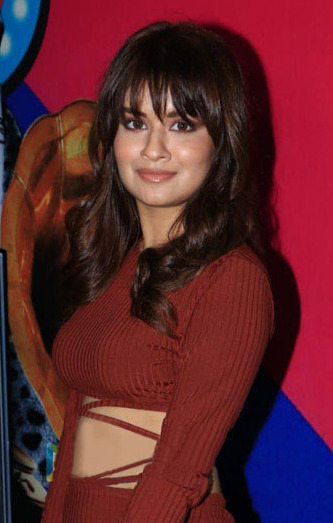
- The 2019 recipient: Reem Shaikh and Avneet Kaur
- Awarded for: Best Performance by a Debut Female Actor in a Lead Role on Television
- Country: India
- Presented by: White Leaf Entertainment
- First award: 2007 (for performances in TV shows in 2006)
- Currently held by: Reem Shaikh for Tujhse Hai Raabta and; Avneet Kaur for Aladdin - Naam Toh Suna Hoga
- Website: Gold Awards

Gold Award for Best Debut Actor in a Lead Role - Female is an award given as part of its annual Gold Awards for TV serials, to recognize a debut actress who has delivered an outstanding performance in a leading role.

== List of winners ==
=== 2000s ===
- 2007 Divyanka Tripathi - Banoo Main Teri Dulhann as Vidya Sagar Singh
  - Twinkle Bajpai - Ghar Ki Lakshmi Betiyaan as Lakshmi
  - Pallavi Subhash - Karam Apnaa Apnaa as Gauri Shiv Kapoor
  - Shalini Chandran - Kahaani Ghar Ghar Ki as Maithili
  - Suhasi Goradia Dhami - Aek Chabhi Hai Padoss Mein as Urmi
  - Shubhangi Atre Poorey - Kasturi as Kasturi
- 2008 Parul Chauhan - Sapna Babul Ka...Bidaai as Ragini
  - Sara Khan - Sapna Babul Ka...Bidaai as Sadhna
  - Parul Chauhan - Sapna Babul Ka...Bidaai as Ragini
  - Additi Gupta - Kis Desh Mein Hai Meraa Dil as Heer
  - Abigail Jain - Kya Dill Mein Hai as Kakoon
  - Avika Gor - Balika Vadhu as Anandi
- 2009 Not Awarded

=== 2010s ===
- 2010 Ankita Lokhande - Pavitra Rishta as Archana Manav Deshmukh
  - Smriti Kalra - 12/24 Karol Bagh as Simran
  - Neha Jhulka - Dill Mill Gayye as Dr. Naina Mehta
  - Rubina Dilaik - Choti Bahu as Radhika
  - Shivshakti Sachdev - Sabki Laadli Bebo as Bebo
- 2011 Pratyusha Banerjee - Balika Vadhu as Anandi Jagdish Singh
  - Anupriya Kapoor - Tere Liye as Taani Banerjee
  - Neha Sargam - Chand Chupa Badal Mein as Nivedita
  - Giaa Manek - Saath Nibhaana Saathiya as Gopi Aham Modi
  - Rucha Hasabnis - Saath Nibhaana Saathiya as Rashi Jigar Modi
- 2012 Deepika Singh - Diya Aur Baati Hum as Sandhya Sooraj Rathi
  - Aakanksha Singh - Na Bole Tum Na Maine Kuch Kaha as Megha Mohan Bhatnagar
  - Mitali Nag - Afsar Bitiya as Krishna Raj
  - Aishwarya Sakhuja - Saas Bina Sasural as Tanya Tej Prakash Chaturvedi (Toasty)
  - Soumya Seth - Navya as Navya Anant Bajpai
  - Kirti Nagpure - Parichay—Nayee Zindagi Kay Sapno Ka as Siddhi Kunal Chopra
- 2013 Surbhi Jyoti - Qubool Hai as Zoya Siddiqui
  - Disha Parmar - Pyaar Ka Dard Hai Meetha Meetha Pyaara Pyaara as Pankhuri Aditya Kumar
  - Ekta Kaul - Rab Se Sohna Isshq as Sahiba Ranveer Singh
  - Roopal Tyagi - Sapne Suhane Ladakpan Ke as Gunjan
  - Shamin Mannan - Sanskaar – Dharohar Apnon Ki as Bhoomi Jaikishan Vaishnav
- 2014 Paridhi Sharma - Jodha Akbar as Jodha (tied with) Preetika Rao - Beintehaa as Aaliya Zain Abdullah
  - Pooja Sharma - Mahabharat as Draupadi
  - Digangana Suryavanshi - Ek Veer Ki Ardaas...Veera as Veera
  - Farnaz Shetty - Ek Veer Ki Ardaas...Veera as Gunjan
  - Harshita Gaur - Sadda Haq as Sanyukta Agarwal
- 2015 Radhika Madan - Meri Aashiqui Tum Se Hi as Ishani Ranveer Waghela
- 2016 Jasmin Bhasin - Tashan-e-Ishq as Twinkle (tied with) Ridhima Pandit - Bahu Hamari Rajni Kant as Rajni
- 2017 Shivangi Joshi - Yeh Rishta Kya Kehlata Hai as Naira Singhania
- 2018 Jannat Zubair Rahmani - Tu Aashiqui as Pankti (tied with) Bhumika Gurung - Nimki Mukhiya as Nimki
- 2019 Avneet Kaur - Aladdin - Naam Toh Suna Hoga as Princess Yasmine (tied with) Reem Shaikh - Tujhse Hai Raabta as Kalyani
