= Razia Sultan (TV series) =

- Promotional image
- Genre: Historical Drama
- Created by: Siddarth Kumar Tewary
- Written by: Anshuman Sinha; Surabhi Saral; Saba Mumtaz, Shailesh Singh
- Directed by: Mukesh kumar singh Arif Ali Ansari; Hasnain Haiderabadwala; Manish Singh; Kamal Monga
- Creative directors: Prakriti Mukherjee; Amol Soorvey
- Presented by: Swastik Pictures
- Starring: See Below
- Country of origin: India
- Original language: Hindi
- No. of seasons: 1
- No. of episodes: 170

Production
- Producers: Siddarth Kumar Tewary; Gayatri Gill Tewary; Rahul Kumar Tewary
- Production location: India
- Editors: Paresh Shah; Ayan B Hashmi
- Camera setup: Multi-camera
- Running time: Approx. 22 minutes
- Production company: Swastik Pictures

Original release
- Network: &TV
- Release: 2 March – 23 October 2015

Razia Sultan was an Indian period drama serial which aired on &TV from 2 March 2015. The main role of empress Razia Sultan was played by Pankhuri Awasthy Rode. The serial is about Razia Sultan (Sultan Razia), the only female ruler of the Delhi Sultanate. It talks about the young lady and her dilemmas with everyday life. The serial was introduced by Shah Rukh Khan as Sutradhar. The song titled Mere Maula of the serial was sung by Supriya Joshi.

== Plot ==
The show focuses on the life of Razia Sultan. She was made the ruler by Sultan Iltutmish himself. In spite of having many sons, he felt that Razia would make a more capable ruler. The show later focuses on 13th century India and Razia's struggles and dilemmas as a Sultan, and as a woman in daily life.

Shahzaadi Razia plans to give her father, Sultan Altamash (Iltutmish) a reminder of his past as his gift for Eid. She visits the Sultan's old employer, Nizam, where she meets Nizam's slave, Fatima. Nizam dies before he can free Fatima from her slavery, which is why Fatima must be buried with him. Razia saves Fatima and Fatima becomes her new helper.

Shah Turkan, Sultan Altamash's courtesan from Lahore, is shown to have come to celebrate Eid with the Sultan with their son, Rukn Uddin Firoz. Shah Turkan is a manipulative lady who wants to see her son as Sultan-e-Hind, heir to the throne, and will stop at nothing to do so. Rukn Uddin is an arrogant brat who likes to humiliate and torture people at will. Razia has a clash with Rukn Uddin in the public market, thereby leading to enmity between them.

The celebrations for Eid have begun. Both, Qutb Begum (Sultan's wife and Razia, Shazia and Naasir's mother) and Shah Turkan vie for Sultan's attention, as the person who Sultan will spend the Eid with has the first right on Eidi, a gift given by the Sultan to his family. Qutb Begum asks Razia to ask Sultan to spend the Eid with them, but Razia asks for Fatima's life instead, much to Qutb Begum and Shamshad Begum's (Qutb Begum's mother, wife of former Sultan Qutb Uddin Aibak) dismay.

They wanted to ask for the Subedaari (military and political charge of a region, stepping stone to becoming heir of the Sultan's throne) of Delhi to be given to Shehzaadah Naasir, Sultan's first son with Qutb Begum as he is most deserving. But Sultan decides to spend the Eid with Shah Turkan, giving her the chance to ask for Rukn Uddin's Subedaari as the Eidi. Razia foils Shah Turkan's plans as she invites the King of Ghazni, Taj Al-din Sultan Yaldoz, Sultan's friend and Naasir's teacher to Delhi for Eid. Sultan Altamash is now forced to spend Eid with his royal family, pleasing Razia's mother.

Qutb Begum and Shah Turkan both ask for the Subedaari of Delhi for their respective sons at the same time during the Eid celebration, to which Sultan responds by organizing a competition for all the capable men to fight for the Subedaari, giving an equal chance to everybody. Qutb Begum has no qualms but Shah Turkan is afraid Rukn Uddin will lose.

Elsewhere, a man named Mirza Altunia (Malik Ikhtyaar Uddin Altunia), is shown to be roaming carefree around Delhi with his friend, Zaaroon. He is philosophical, carefree and an overconfident youth looking for ways to entertain himself. He goes to the Dargah to get his favourite perfume, where Razia also comes to pray for her brother's success in the competition. Her prayer bespoken and perfumed handkerchief falls in Mirza's hand, who keeps it with him as it has his perfume on it. He hears of the competition and decides to take part in it too.

Shah Turkan sabotages Naasir's riding equipment, which causes him to fall during the fight, leading to his defeat, much to the dismay of the royal family. Rukn Uddin is the only one left in the competition. Just before he is declared the winner, Mirza enters fray and defeats him, becoming the Subedaar of Delhi. He doesn't stop to claim his prize and is shown to have returned to where he came from. He does this because he had realised that Rukn Uddin was unfit to be the Subedaar and that he had cheated during the competition. Meanwhile, Razia celebrates the fact that Rukn Uddin won't be the Subedaar and that Naasir still stands a chance.

Mirza is shown to be a slave to a quarry and forgery owner, whose horse and armour Mizra had stolen for the fight. The owner is shown to be an unjust and ruthless man, who kills another slave just because he stole some food. Mirza sees this and becomes furious, and kills his master in anger, which is considered a grave sin in Delhi. He flees the scene with Zaaroon and decides to leave Delhi.

Shah Turkan accidentally hints Razia that she sabotaged Naasir's riding equipment, resulting in his defeat. Razia decides to figure it out by looking for the damaged saddle. But Shah Turkan and Rukn Uddin get ahead of her and cause misunderstandings between Sultan and Naasir. Naasir, in anger, leaves the palace for Multan, his uncle's kingdom, along with his mother and grandmother. Razia decides to stay back and convince her father to forgive Naasir. Later she decides to go to Multan to convince her brother to return. Rana Maartand, Sultan's aide and trusted military commander accompanies her. Meanwhile, Shah Turkan conspired to send her men amongst the ranks of Razia's guard. When Razia arrived at Multan, all the soldiers except Rana Maartand fought with Naasir, causing him to believe that the Sultan wants war. He slays Rana Martand in the fight that ensued due to a misunderstanding. The corpses of Rana Martand and other soldiers are sent to the Sultan, leading him to believe that Naasir wants war. Both sides have begun to prepare for war, but Razia wants to stop it at any cost. She decides to go to Ghazni alone to seek Sultan Yaldoz's help as he is both a friend of the Sultan and a mentor to Naasir. She prepares to leave with her servant Chanda while Fatima stays back to keep Razia updated and to try to keep the situation under control. Her family in Multan believes that Razia has left for Delhi, while the Sultan believes her to still be in Multan.

Mirza plans to depart for Ghazni and decides to meet his childhood companions for one last time. He is shown to be a former student of Haaji Jamaal, an assassin who trains young boys to murder for money. Mirza too received this training, making him proficient in the usage of arms and warfare. But Haaji Jamaal desires for Mirza to be killed, as he didn't like that Mirza left them and didn't become and assassin himself, and Haaji also fears that Mirza will leak the secrets of his society to others. Haaji declares Mirza as his best student, sparking jealousy in 2 of his students, who decide to kill Mirza for the title.

Razia begins her journey and on her way finds many obstacles. She sees some young girls in cages and men carrying them somewhere. She decides to free the girls, but gets herself captured in the process. She then goes with the men to Mandi Kabraan, where young girls and women are bought and sold to become prostitutes, courtesans and slaves. Razia decides to free herself and the other girls there from this enslavement.

Back in Multan, Qutub Begum extends an invitation to Illtumish to meet her for the Urs of Shah Ji. This gesture deeply touches the Sultan's heart, as Qutub Begum holds a special place as his most beloved wife, hence why he named her Qutub Jaan. However, this action greatly upsets Shah Turkan, who intentionally injures herself and pretends to be pregnant in order to hinder the Sultan and accompany him to meet Qutub. Shah Turkan goes to the extent of hiring a highly dangerous assassin to kill Razia before she reaches Ghazni. During the Urs, an accidental push from Qutub Begum towards Shah Turkan leads to accusations of causing a miscarriage. This prompts Nasir to disrespect Turkan, which in turn angers Illtumish. In front of Qutub, Illtumish vows to marry Turkan and make her his official wife, granting her the same status as Qutub. Heartbroken, Qutub and Nasir return to Multan. Meanwhile, Chanda is killed while saving Razia's life, and Razia disguises herself as a man to join a group of nomads traveling to Ghazni who also include Mirza. However, Altunia discovers her true identity when he catches her swimming in the river. Altunia assists Razia in honing her skills in swordsmanship, horseriding, and self-defense. As they spend more time together, Razia and Altunia begin to develop feelings for each other. Razia keeps her true identity hidden from Altunia, who affectionately refers to her as Mohtarma due to her regal demeanor and refined choices. Upon returning to Delhi, Illtumish weds Shah Turkan, much to the Royal Family's dismay. Shah Turkan then learns that Razia is still alive after discovering that the dead body of her assassin was found in the forest. In the dead of the night, Razia leaves Altunia alone to avoid revealing her true identity. However, she returns just in time to save Mirza from his two friends, who were sent by Haji Jamal to kill him, even sacrificing herself by taking a dagger for him. As Razia and Mirza journey to Ghazni, Mirza finally realizes that Razia is a Shahzaadi, the same princess he had fallen in love with at the Dargah. He demands answers from her, only to be escorted out by royal guards. Despite this, Razia promises to wait for him in Delhi, tossing him the same red scarf he received at the Dargah. She implores Sultan Yaldoz to accompany her and intervene in the conflict between Nasir and Illtumish. However, Shah Turkan also arrives in Ghazni and attempts to manipulate Yaldoz. Despite her efforts, Yaldoz is captivated by Razia's beauty and decides to follow her to Delhi. Meanwhile, the battle between Illtumish and Nasir commences, with Illtumish initially gaining the upper hand. However, Nasir is reminded of the disrespect and heartbreak his mother endured due to Illtumish's marriage to Turkan. He nearly kills Illtumish before being halted by Yaldoz, who accuses Sultan Khwaja of plotting to kill Nasir and seize control of Delhi Sultanate.

The father and son are reunited, and preparations commence for Nasir's coronation. Meanwhile, Mirza has arrived in Delhi and is waiting for Razia to meet him. However, Razia rejects him as Sultan Yaldoz has proposed marriage to her and she feels obliged to return his favour of stopping the fight between her father and brother. Sultan Illtumish and Nasir refuse Yaldoz's proposal, asserting that Razia should have the freedom to choose her own partner rather than being forced into a political marriage. Yaldoz becomes furious and teams up with Shah Turkan to plot a massacre against the Royal family during Nasir's coronation. They bring in Laal Shahbaaz Qalandari from Lahore, who appears to be a talented dancer, but is actually a sinister man who had taught Shah Turkan how to dance and ha been hired by her to kill the Shahi Khandaan, and smuggles numerous swords into the palace. On the night of the coronation, Mirza abducts Razia and takes her to a barn to demand answers. Razia reveals the truth about Yaldoz's proposal. Inside the palace, Laal Shahbaaz launches his attack, targeting the crown prince Shahzaada Nasir, Razia and Qutub Jaan. Many lives are lost, including Nasir, Qutub Begum, Badi Naani, and the Sultan, who appears to fall into a coma.

== Cast ==
- Pankhuri Awasthy Rode as Razia Sultan
- Rohit Purohit as Ikhtiyar ud-din Malik Altunia
- Saurabh Pandey as Jamal-ud-Din Yaqut
- Sooraj Thapar as Shams-ud-din Iltutmish
- Khalida Turi as Qutub Begum
- Mohit Abrol as Nasiruddin Mahmud
- Seema Kapoor as Shamshad Begum aka Valida-e-Sultana
- Sambhavna Seth as Shah Turkan
- Ankit Arora as Rukn-ud-din Firuz
- Puja Banerjee as Yasmine: Rukn-ud-din Firuz's wife and Ala ud din Mausad's mother.
- Bhavna Chauhan / Zara Barring as Shazia Begum
- Dalip Tahil as Maroosh
- Manish Khanna as Taj al-Din Yildiz
- Praneet Bhat as Kasabi Kalandar Lahori / Shagird
- Riya Deepsi as Fatima Begum: Razia's best-friend and trusted servant
- Himangini Singh Yadu /Jaswinder Gardner as Uzma Begum
- Swati Anand as Nadira Begum
- Vikas Bangar as Sipasardar
- Jimmy Rampal as Bhaktawar
- James Ghadge as Shehzada Yasir
- Eijaz Khan as Muiz ud din Bahram
- Mandar Jadhav as Iqbal Khan (Tafal Sultan)
- Baizad Khan as Nasir ad-Din Qabacha
- Anil Rastogi as Nizamuddin
- Dhruvee Haldankar as Hippie
- Rishima Sidhu as Kaneez of Shah Turkan
- Vikram Mastal (Sharma) as Bilal Khan
- Aakash Bhatija as Zaroon Miyan: Altunia's best-friend
