= Additi Gupta =

Indian television actress (born 1988)

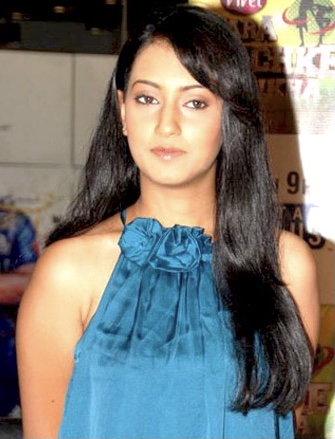
- Gupta in 2010
- Born: 21 April 1988 (age 38); Bhopal, Madhya Pradesh, India
- Occupation: Actress
- Years active: 2008–2022
- Notable work: Kis Desh Mein Hai Meraa Dil; Qubool Hai
- Spouses: Kabir Chopra (m. 2018)
- Relatives: Megha Gupta (sister); Amrapali Gupta (sister)

Additi Gupta (born 21 April 1988) is an Indian television actress, best known for playing Heer in Kis Desh Mein Hai Meraa Dil, Khan Begum in Qubool Hai and Dr. Deepika Sinha in Dhadkan Zindaggi Kii.

== Early life ==
Gupta was born on 21 April 1988 in Bhopal, Madhya Pradesh to Ved Prakash and Kavita Gupta. Her sister Megha Gupta is also a television actress.

== Career ==
Gupta's first role on television was as Heer Maan in Ekta Kapoor's production Kis Desh Mein Hai Meraa Dil. Gupta earned an Indian Telly Award for Best Actress in a Lead Role nomination, but went off air in 2010.

After Kis Desh Mein Hai Meraa Dil, participated in Zara Nachke Dikha where her team won was well received in exception. Gul Khan signed her to play a negative role in the daily TV soap, Qubool Hai via Zee TV from 2014. Qubool Hai wrapped up in January 2016.

In October 2016, Gupta was cast as Sanjana Singhal in the Star Plus drama Pardes Mein Hai Meraa Dil, an inspiration of the 1997 film Pardes. She left her role five months later, due to creative issues. She next landed Ishqbaaaz with the same channel and was seen as Ragini Sparsh Malhotra. She entered the series along with Ankit Raaj.

In November 2018, Gupta starred opposite Gautam Rode as the female lead Archana in Star Bharat's Kaal Bhairav Rahasya 2.

Gupta portrayed Dr. Deepika Sinha in Dhadkan Zindaggi Kii from 2021 to 2022. She received praises for her role.

== Personal life ==
Gupta got engaged to her boyfriend businessman Kabir Chopra in September 2018. She married Chopra in Mumbai in October 2018.

== Filmography ==
=== Films ===
Year	Title	Role	Notes	Ref.
2017	Sinha V/S Sinha	Ms. Sinha	Short film	

=== Television ===
Year	Title	Role	Notes	Ref.
2008–2010	Kis Desh Mein Hai Meraa Dil	Heer Maan Juneja	Lead Role	
2010–2011	Sanjog Se Bani Sangini	Priyamvada "Pihu"	Negative Role	
2011–2012	Zindagi Kahe – Smile Please	Harmony Modi	Lead Role	
2012	Punar Vivah	Chand Bibi		
2013	Badalte Rishton Ki Dastaan	Nandini Tiwari	Lead Role	
2013	Yeh Hai Aashiqui	Ganga	Episodic Role	
2014	Savdhaan India	Razia	(Episode 787)	
2014–2016	Qubool Hai	Sanam Ibrahim / Khan Begum	Negative Role	
2016–2017	Pardes Mein Hai Mera Dil	Sanjana Mehra	Negative Role	
2017	Ishqbaaaz	Ragini Malhotra	Negative Role	
2018–2019	Kaal Bhairav Rahasya 2	Archana "Archie" Singh	Lead Role	
2021–2022	Dhadkan Zindaggi Kii	Dr. Deepika Sinha	Lead Role	

=== Reality Shows ===
Year	Show	Role
2010	Zara Nachke Dikha	Contestant
2014–2015	Box Cricket League 1	Contestant
2016	Box Cricket League 2	Contestant
2018	Box Cricket League 3	Contestant
2019	Box Cricket League 4	Contestant

==== Special appearances ====
Year	Title	Role	Notes
2008	Kasautii Zindagii Kay	Heer Mann	
2008	Kumkum – Ek Pyara Sa Bandhan	Heer Mann	
2008	Kayamath	Heer Mann	
2008	Jo Jeeta Wohi Super Star	Heer Mann	
2009	Sapna Babul Ka... Bidaai	Heer Mann	
2009	Tujh Sang Preet Lagai Sajna	Heer Mann	
2009	Raja Ki Aayegi Baraat	Heer Mann	
2009	Yeh Rishta Kya Kehlata Hai	Heer Mann	
2011	Pavitra Rishta	Herself	
2011	Preet Se Bandhi Ye Dori Ram Milaayi Jodi	Herself	
2011	Sanskaar Laxmi	Herself	
2012	Hitler Didi	Herself	
2015	Swaragini - Jodein Rishton Ke Sur	Herself	
2016	Kaala Teeka	Herself	

=== Web series ===
Year	Title	Role	Notes	Ref.
2024	IC 814: The Kandahar Hijack	Air hostess Chhaya	Netflix series	

== Awards and nominations ==
Year	Award	Category	Work	Result	Ref.
2008	Indian Telly Awards	Best Actress in a Lead Role	Kis Desh Mein Hai Meraa Dil	Nominated	
2008	Indian Telly Awards	Fresh New Face - Female	Kis Desh Mein Hai Meraa Dil	Nominated	
2008	Indian Television Academy Awards	Best Actress (Popular)	Kis Desh Mein Hai Meraa Dil	Nominated	
2008	Gold Awards	Best Actress in a Lead Role	Kis Desh Mein Hai Meraa Dil	Nominated	
2008	Gold Awards	Debut in a Lead Role (Female)	Kis Desh Mein Hai Meraa Dil	Nominated	
2015	Indian Telly Awards	Best Actress in a Negative Role	Qubool Hai	Nominated	
2015	Gold Awards	Best Actress in a Negative Role	Qubool Hai	Nominated	
2022	Indian Television Academy Awards	Best Actress (Drama)	Dhadkan Zindaggi Kii	Nominated	

== See also ==
- List of Indian television actresses
