= Harsha Khandeparkar =

Indian model and television actress (born 1987)

- Born: 26 October 1992 (age 33); Goa, India
- Occupations: Actress, Model, Singer
- Years active: 2008–present

Harsha Khandeparkar (born 26 October 1992) is an Indian model and television actress, known for the portrayal of Keerti Goenka Singhania, the parallel lead in Yeh Rishta Kya Kehlata Hai. Harsha has appeared in several television shows and a Marathi movie. Harsha appeared as the main lead Aastha in Khwabon Ke Darmiyan which telecasted on Doordarshan National, bringing her more viewers.

== Personal life and education ==
Born and brought up in Goa, Harsha has completed her schooling from St. Xavier's College, Mapusa, Goa and later shifted to Pune to complete her graduation in BSc. zoology from Fergusson College.

== Career ==
=== Television ===
Soon after her graduation, Harsha auditioned for the upcoming show on 9X titled as "Neelanjana". She was selected and called for look test to Mumbai. Harsha bagged the titular role of the show, hence playing "Neelanjana" in the show. Later Harsha went on to play lead one of the lead characters, Rajshree Goradia, opposite Manish Raisinghan in the show Hum Dono Hain Alag Alag aired on STAR One in 2009. Show also starred Yash Pandit and Dimple Jhangiani in lead roles.

Not just restricting herself to positive lead roles, Harsha played the grey character of "Sanchi" in one of the Colors TV's longest running show Uttaran. Harsha had entered the show along with co-actor Sharad Kelkar, who played her brother in the show. Later Harsha appeared as Anuradha Dewan in popular show Pyaar Ka Dard Hai Meetha Meetha Pyaara Pyaara under the banner of Rajshri Productions which aired on Star Plus.

Harsha appeared as the main lead Aastha in Khwabon Ke Darmiyan which telecasted on Doordarshan National, bringing her more viewers. She has also appeared in several episodic roles in shows including CID, Code Red, and Love by Chance.

In August 2020, she bagged the role of Keerti Goenka Singhania in Star Plus's longest-running cult soap Yeh Rishta Kya Kehlata Hai, replacing Mohena Kumari Singh. The role brought her widespread recognition and fame. She made an exit from the show owing to generation leap in October 2021.

== Filmography ==
=== Films ===
| Year | Title | Notes | Ref. |
|---|---|---|---|
| 2016 | Ticha Umbartha | | |
| 2018 | Violin Player | Short film | |

=== Television ===
| Year | Title | Role | Notes | Ref. |
|---|---|---|---|---|
| 2009 | Neelanjana | | | |
| 2009 | Hum Dono Hain Alag Alag | Rajshree Goradia | | |
| 2011 | Uttaran | Sanchi Singh | | |
| 2013 | Pyaar Ka Dard Hai Meetha Meetha Pyaara Pyaara | Anuradha Sachdev Deewan / Roshni | | |
| 2014–2016 | Khwabon Ke Darmiyan | Aastha | | |
| 2019–2020 | RadhaKrishn | Kutila | | |
| 2020–2021 | Yeh Rishta Kya Kehlata Hai | Keerti Goenka Singhania | | |
| 2020 | Devi Adi Parashakti | Devi Rati | | |
| 2025–2026 | Jhanak | Putul Chatterjee | | |
