= The Monk Who Became Chief Minister =

2017 book by Shantanu Gupta

- Biography's Cover
- Author: Shantanu Gupta
- Language: English
- Genre: Biography
- Publisher: Bloomsbury Publishing (India)
- Publication date: 25 August 2017
- Publication place: India
- Media type: E-book, Print (Paperback)
- Pages: 164 pp.
- ISBN: 9789386606426

The Monk Who Became Chief Minister : The Definitive Biography Of Yogi Adityanath is a biography of Yogi Adityanath, the 22nd Chief Minister of Uttar Pradesh. It is written by Shantanu Gupta, an Indian author and political analyst. The book has been published by Bloomsbury Publishing, India and came out on 25 August 2017. The cover of the biography was released on 23 July 2017 at an event of CREDAI at Lucknow.

== Summary ==
The biography has four sections. The first section is about the current role of Yogi Adityanath as the Chief Minister of Uttar Pradesh and his first days in office. The second section discusses his tenure as parliamentarian from the Gorakhpur constituency. It elaborates on his electoral victories, interventions in parliament, controversial speeches, and his thoughts on Love Jihad, religious conversion, Hindu Yuva Vahini, and his relationship with the Bharatiya Janata Party. The third sections discusses Yogi's life as mahant of Gorakhpur mutt and his yogic routine. Section also talks about the gurus of nath panth and socio-political activities of mutt over decades. The last section discusses Adityanath's youth and his upbringing as Ajay Mohan Bisht in the hinterlands of Pauri, Uttarakhand among cows, farms and mountains.

== Reception ==
In August 2017, Hindustan Times categorised book in the five books of August reading list.

Nistula Hebbar, writing for The Hindu, found the book full of "interesting vignettes" about Yogi Adityanath. She noted that rise of Yogi Adityanath to prominence raised curiosity about him which this book may go some way in fulfilling.

Talha Ashraf reviewed work for ThePrint. He noted that author gives a detailed account of Adityanath's record as parliamentarian and administrator against his firebrand image. In addition, he wrote that "it [book] praises him for injecting discipline into Lucknow's bureaucracy, waiving farm loans and cracking down on crime." According to Ashraf, book loses steam when it comes to "so-called Love Jihad" issue. In his observation, book starts on promising note but fails to give an objective portrayal of leader.

== Film adaptation ==
A film titled Ajey: The Untold Story of a Yogi is reportedly in development, inspired by Shantanu Gupta's biography The Monk Who Became Chief Minister. Announced in March 2025, the film aims to portray the life of Yogi Adityanath, focusing on his journey from a monk to a prominent political figure.
