= Ek Packet Umeed =

Indian television series

- Genre: Drama
- Created by: Jamnadas Majethia
- Written by: Munisha Rajpal
- Screenplay by: Sonal Ganatra
- Starring: See below
- Country of origin: India
- Original language: Hindi

Production
- Running time: 60 minutes
- Production company: Hats Off Productions

Original release
- Network: NDTV Imagine
- Release: 5 February – 23 September 2008

Ek Packet Umeed (transl. One packet hope) is a weekly show that aired on NDTV Imagine.

== Plot ==
The story focuses on Ambika Dharamraj and 15 other members who have all chosen to make a change. Despite having undergone such misery they now live a happy life in a home they can call their own and with a family of their choice! With a never-say-die attitude, each of the characters have taken it upon themselves to bring joy and happiness through the packets of food like masalas, aachar, papads, jams that they make and sell every day.

== End ==
While the show was anticipated to make significant progress, the storyline failed to captivate the attention of the audience and was ultimately terminated after airing 33 episodes. The producers blamed the timing and dynamics of the show, as the show was aired only once a week, which with the fleeting memory of the audience and the available competition of other shows, prevented Ek Packet Umeed from being successful.

== Characters ==
Character	Role
Ambika Dharamraj	(played by Neena Kulkarni) is the 50-year-old Head of Umeed Bhavan. She has a strict demeanor with a strong sense of what she believes in as right and wrong and hence she is very fair and objective in all her decisions. At the same time she is extremely loving and caring towards all the women of Umeed Bhavan.
Sujata	(played by Rupali Ganguly) is the 25-year-old vivacious daughter of Ambika Dharamraj. She is a typical youngster who is happy with life in general and also has quite a stubborn streak in her. She is loved by one and all at Umeed Bhavan
Bakuben & Shakuben	(played by Suhas Joshi & Sulbha Deshpande) are the grandmothers of Umeed Bhavan. They are in charge of making and rolling papads. They are best of friends, love watching movies, dressing up and behave more like young school girls, constantly giggling and sharing secrets. They are the quintessential old women who have great zest for food, make-up, clothes and life in general.
Farzana	(played by Trishna Vivek) is Kanchan's assistant. She idolizes TV stars and loves dressing up like them and speaks horrible Urdu. She is more concerned about her looks than her cooking. Farzana is often reprimanded by Kanchan for being lazy and inefficient but it hardly ever affects her. She lives in a fantasy world.
Maggie	(played by Meher Acharia-Dar) is the 35-year-old Catholic who is in charge of the Jams and Marmalade Division at Umeed Bhavan. She speaks atrocious Hindi and loves narrating stories that are constantly out of context. She is the constant source of amusement and support for all at Umeed Bhavan.
Paroma	(played by Lubna Salim) is an arrogant and snooty woman but at the same time has an inherent need to be accepted by all. She lives at Umeed Bhavan but has a strong air of supremacy about her. She is extremely efficient at her work but is a woman of strong likes and dislikes. She constantly looks down upon all men and often quarrels with her roommate Sundari whom she considers too juvenile.
Sundari	played by Aatisha Naik) is the 35-year-old former Lavani dancer with a great sense of humor and a carefree attitude. She lives life on her own terms and doesn't take anything too seriously. She also constantly teases both Paroma and Kanchan and makes jokes about them with all.
Anuj	(played by Rakesh Bapat) is a 27-year-old MBA graduate who helps run Umeed Bhavan and works there as well. Sujata and he are longtime friends. Sujata is not aware of Anuj's love for her and Anuj is too shy to ever express it. Anuj also happens to be a great photographer and loves taking candid pictures of Sujata.
Kanchan	(played by Suchita Trivedi) is the head cook of Umeed Bhavan and she often shouts at Farzana for her mistakes.

=== Guests ===
- Sidharth Shukla (2008)
- Rajesh Kumar (actor) as Gudiya's Groom(2008)

== Awards ==
=== The Indian Telly Awards ===
- Best Weekly Programme - Winner (2008)
