= Ajey: The Untold Story of a Yogi =

2025 Indian Hindi biographical drama film

Ajey: The Untold Story Of A Yogi
- Theatrical release poster
- Directed by: Ravindra Gautam
- Written by: Dilip Bachchan Jha & Priyank Dubey
- Based on: The Monk Who Became Chief Minister by Shantanu Gupta
- Produced by: Ritu Mengi
- Starring: Anant Joshi; Paresh Rawal; Dinesh Lal Yadav
- Cinematography: Vishnu Rao
- Edited by: Manan Sagar
- Music by: Meet Bros
- Production company: Samrat Cinematics
- Release date: 19 September 2025
- Running time: 148 minutes
- Country: India
- Language: Hindi
- Budget: ₹15 crore
- Box office: ₹1.4 crore

Ajey: The Untold Story of a Yogi is a 2025 India political drama film, directed by Ravindra Gautam and produced by Ritu Mengi under the banner of Samrat Cinematics. The film, officially released on 19 September 2025, is inspired by Shantanu Gupta's book The Monk Who Became Chief Minister, and stars Anant Joshi as Yogi Adityanath, the incumbent chief minister of Uttar Pradesh. It received mixed reviews from the critics and became a box office bomb.

== Plot ==
The film follows the journey of a boy from the hills of Uttar Pradesh (now Uttarakhand) who went on to become one of India's most influential political leaders. It traces his transformation from a quiet, introverted child into a Yogi, and later, a reformist politician. Through his struggles, bold decisions, and unwavering leadership, the story explores how he overcame challenges to ultimately lead India's largest state.

== Cast ==
- Anant Joshi as Ajey Yogi, based on Yogi Adityanath
- Paresh Rawal as Yogi's Guru, based on Mahant Avaidyanath
- Dinesh Lal Yadav
- Ankur Thakur, as Mushtaq Ansari, brother of Mushtaq Ahmed
- Ajay Mengi as Raghu, a devotee of Matha
- Pavan Malhotra
- Garima Vikrant
- Rajesh Khattar as Mushtaq Ahmed, a mafia member
- Sarwar Ahuja
- Bhagwan Tiwari
- Jatin Negi
- Akash Mahamana as Bala, a devotee of Matha

== Production ==
=== Development ===
The concept for the film originated from Shantanu Gupta's 2017 book. Following the book's success, Gupta collaborated with Priyank Dubey, a film industry associate, to develop the book into a film and started working on the story.

=== Filming ===
Principal photography for the film commenced in 2024 across various locations in Uttarakhand and Uttar Pradesh, aiming to authentically depict Yogi Adityanath's journey from his birthplace to his political career. The filmmakers emphasized maintaining factual accuracy and cultural sensitivity throughout the production process. Filming was completed by May 2025, with the project entering post-production.

== Release ==
The first motion poster of the film was released on 26 March 2025.

=== Theatrical ===
The film was scheduled for a worldwide theatrical release on 1 August 2025. But it was not released as CBFC denied certification to the film. After the certification from CBFC, the film is scheduled to release on 19 September 2025.

=== Box office ===
Made with a budget of almost 15 crore, the movie earned 1.5 crore during the first week since its release.

== Reception ==
Himanshi Tiwari from India TV gave the film 3 stars out of 5, praising the performances, direction, screenplay, cinematography and background score. Rishabh Suri from Hindustan Times gave the film 2.5 stars out of 5 and praised the cinematography and performances, while feeling the film struggled under the weight of its own ambition.

== See also ==
- The Monk Who Became Chief Minister
- Yogi Adityanath
- The UP Files
- The Bengal Files
- The Kashmir Files
