= Ravindra Gautam =

Indian film director, script writer and producer

- Born: Lucknow, Uttar Pradesh
- Occupations: Film director, script writer, producer
- Notable work: Ekkees Toppon Ki Salaami, Kasautii Zindagii Kay, Bade Achhe Lagte Hain, Madhubala Ek Ishq Ek Junoon, Meri Durga
- Awards: ITA Award, Best Director-Drama

Ravindra Gautam is an Indian film and television director and producer known for his directorial work in the web series in the second season of Maharani & the film Ekkees Toppon Ki Salaami. He made his directorial debut with Kasautii Zindagii Kay. Gautam received the ITA Award for Best Director-Drama for his direction of the show and Bade Achhe Lagte Hain Ravindra directed the biographical film Ajey: The Untold Story of a Yogi which released in 2025.

== Career ==
Ravindra Gautam was born and raised in Lucknow, India. He joined Yayavar Rang Mandal in Lucknow when he was studying in Lucknow University. A banker by profession, quit his job and shifted to Mumbai. He got his break as a director with Kasautii Zindagii Kay. Gautam received the ITA Award for Best Director-Drama for his contributions to Kasautii Zindagii Kay and Bade Achhe Lagte Hain. He also worked on Pavitra Rishta, Parichay, Mann Kee Awaaz Pratigya and Uttaran.

== Filmography ==
=== Film ===
- Ajey: The Untold Story of a Yogi (2025)
- Ekkees Toppon Ki Salaami (2014)

=== Webseries ===
- Maharani (2022)

=== Television ===
- Karthik Purnima (2019)
- Kaal Bhairav Rahasya 2 (2018)
- Meri Durga (2017)
- Begusarai (2015)
- Kumkum Bhagya (2014)
- Do Dil Ek Jaan (2013)
- Madhubala-Ek Ishq Ek Junoon (2012)
- Kya Huaa Tera Vaada (2012)
- Parichay (2011)
- Bade Achhe Lagte Hain (2011)
- Tere Liye (2010)
- Armanon Ka Balidaan-Aarakshan (2010)
- Pavitra Rishta (2009)
- Mann Kee Awaaz Pratigya (2009)
- Bandini (2009)
- Uttaran (2008)
- Karam Apnaa Apnaa (2006)
- Kasautii Zindagii Kay (2001)
