= Kadhal Solla Aasai =

2014 Indian film by K.S. Tamil Seenu

- Poster
- Directed by: K.S. Tamil Seenu
- Produced by: S. Rajalakshmi; S. Vijayalakshmi
- Starring: Ashok; Wasna Ahmed; Madhu Raghuram; Ravi Raghavendra
- Cinematography: Jacob Rathinaraj
- Music by: S. Lekha
- Production company: Emersiigns Productions
- Release date: 14 March 2014
- Country: India
- Language: Tamil

Kadhal Solla Aasai (transl. The desire to express love) is a 2014 Tamil-language romantic drama film directed by K.S. Tamil Seenu. The film stars Ashok, Wasna Ahmed, Madhu Raghuram, and Ravi Raghavendra with Rajendran in a negative role.

== Cast ==
- Ashok as Mahesh
- Wasna Ahmed as Suchitra
- Madhu Raghuram as Gautam
- Ravi Raghavendra as Ravikanth
- Rajendran as Verumpuli
- M. S. Bhaskar as Anjali's father
- Ravi
- Manimaran
- Suganya
- Daniel
- Siva

== Production ==
Sound engineer Thamizh Seenu was encouraged by his friends to participate in the Nalaya Iyakkunar talent show on TV and eventually direct his own film. Sisters S. Rajalakshmi and S. Vijayalakshmi agreed to produce the film after hearing the film's screenplay. Telugu music director M. M. Srilekha agreed to score the music for the film after appealing to the film's story. This is her second Tamil film after Naalaiya Theerpu (1992). Sound engineer Madhu Raghuram makes his acting debut in this film after Thamizh Seenu approached him. His character is one of the main characters that appears in the second half. Noted personalites like T. Siva, G. N. R. Kumaravelan, and Mahendran and cast members M. S. Baskar and Rajendran released the film's trailer.

== Soundtrack ==
M. M. Srilekha composed six songs for the film. During the audio launch event in Chennai, the songs were released by Keyaar and received by S. J. Suryah and Vijay Sethupathi. The songs were notably released online directly instead of through a CD.

Song title	Lyricist	Singers
"Thamizhachi Thamizhachi"	Pa. Vijay	Achu
"Madai Thiranthu"	Pa. Vijay	Suraj
"Enna Maayam Seithayo"	K.S. Tamil Seenu	Chinmayi
"Ramaiya Osthavaiya"	K.S. Tamil Seenu	Velmurugan, M.K. Balaji, Senthildass Velayutham, Krishnamurthy
"Yen Uyire Nee"	K.S. Tamil Seenu	Yasin

== Reception ==
The Times of India gave the film two-and-a-half out of five stars and wrote that "Director K S Tamil Seenu has come up with a clean, decent entertainer".
