= Rok Sako To Rok Lo =

- Theatrical release poster
- Directed by: Arindam Chaudhuri
- Written by: Arindam Chaudhuri; Amar Mukherjee
- Produced by: Arindam Chaudhuri
- Starring: Sunny Deol; Yash Pandit; Manjari; Namrata Shirodkar
- Narrated by: Namrata Shirodkar
- Cinematography: Santosh Thundiyil
- Edited by: Rabiranjan Maitra
- Music by: Jatin–Lalit
- Production company: Planman Life
- Distributed by: Planman Life
- Release date: 10 December 2004
- Country: India
- Language: Hindi

Rok Sako To Rok Lo (transl. Stop Me if You Can) is a 2004 Indian Hindi-language sports comedy film produced and directed by Arindam Chaudhuri, in his debut. The film stars Sunny Deol, Yash Pandit, Manjari and Namrata Shirodkar. The music was scored by Jatin–Lalit.

== Plot ==
There are two neighbouring high schools – Bharti School, for the middle class, and Valley High School, for the affluent. Dev, Suhana, and their friends come from Bharti and are often tormented by their enemies who come from Valley High. The Valley High students also defeat the Bharti students in every single annual inter-school event, which is the main reason why they torment the Bharti students. One day, however, the Bharti students are saved from the Valley High students by a mysterious man, Kabir Mukherjee "Phantom", who always rides a Harley-Davidson motorcycle. They initially fear him because of his rugged looks, thereby the reason they always called him "Phantom".

The Bharti students get close to Kabir and befriend him. They regularly meet him at a café owned by a young woman, Sandra, who is secretly in love with Kabir. With time, Kabir becomes more gentle and normal, thereby getting rid of his "Phantom" look. Dev, meanwhile, gets attached to Sanjana, a girl from Valley High, which results in him dropping Suhana. But Sanjana eventually drops him because he once insulted her at a café and because he belongs to the rival school. One day Kabir brings a car and invites Dev to drive it. Just before they leave, Kabir finally nods back at the happy Sandra, a silent acknowledgment that he is also falling for her. In that moment, they share their first romantic emotional connection. But, their unfolding romance gets tragically severed by a twist of fate. While driving on an open road, Dev and his friends are again insulted and called slow by the Valley High students who are driving on the same road. Dev drives faster and overtakes them, but he loses control, and the car crashes, killing Kabir. This leaves the Bharti students and Sandra heartbroken.

Now, the Bharti students become depressed and defenceless against the Valley High students, with whom they have an upcoming 100 metres race competition. Dev, however, inspired by Kabir, is still determined, so he trains up and attends the race with full confidence. During the race, he gets injured by one of the runners but does not lose hope, and through last-minute strength, he wins the race, thereby finally letting Bharti get their revenge on Valley High. Incidentally, the prize for the winner is a bike similar to Kabir's, so Dev, following Kabir, becomes the new "Phantom".

== Cast ==
- Sunny Deol as Kabir "Phantom" Mukherjee, a mysterious Harley-Davidson biker
- Yash Pandit as Dev Verma
- Manjari as Suhana Sharma, Dev's girlfriend
- Namrata Shirodkar as Sandra – Café owner, who is secretly in love with Kabir
- Shreya Das as Suhana's friend
- Carran Kapur as Ranveer Pratap Singh
- Aparna Kumar as Sanjana Badola
- Deepti Bhatnagar as Dev's bhabhi
- Archana Puran Singh as Sweety
- Tinnu Anand as S.V.P.S. Balasubramaniam Iyer
- Rakesh Bedi as Ghodbole
- Rajit Kapoor
- Tiku Talsania as Sweety's husband
- Aanjjan Srivastav as Ganguly

== Production ==
Rok Sako To Rok Lo was the directorial debut for Arindam Chaudhuri. According to him, "The central theme is friendship". He also mentioned that it would show how "the principal of management can help reduce wastage of money in the film industry." The film was one out of 50 different stories which he worked on. The cast had mostly teenage debutants, while established actors like Tikku Talsania, Archana Puransingh, Anjan Srivastva, Rakesh Bedi, Tinu Anand and Rajit Kapoor played supporting roles. To choose a title for the film, Chaudhuri conducted "market research". The film's production budget was ₹6.5 crore (equivalent to ₹23 crore or US$2.4 million in 2023), and marketing costs were ₹5.5 crore (equivalent to ₹19 crore or US$2.0 million in 2023).

== Music and soundtrack ==
The film's music was composed by Jatin–Lalit, while the lyrics of the songs were penned by Prasoon Joshi.

Track listing
No.	Title	Singer(s)	Length
1.	"Haan Mujhe Thaam Le"	Babul Supriyo, Alka Yagnik	04:25
2.	"Jaane Kise"	Shaan, Alka Yagnik	04:26
3.	"Nazron Ka Yaarana"	Shaan, Sunidhi Chauhan	05:10
4.	"Rok Sako To Rok Lo"	Shaan, Babul Supriyo, Shreya Ghoshal, Lalit Pandit, Ishaan	04:31
5.	"Tera Gham"	Sonu Nigam, Alka Yagnik	04:03
6.	"Yaaron Sun Lo"	Abhijeet Bhattacharya	05:08
7.	"Yaaron Sun Lo" (Sad)	Abhijeet Bhattacharya	01:55

== Critical reception ==
Patcy N of Rediff.com said, "Manjari has performed well, but Yash looks nervous in some scenes", and further wrote, "I would recommend renting a Jo Jeeta Wohi Sikander DVD instead of spending money to watch this film." Subhash K. Jha rated the film 2/5 and said, "Sadly, the film's basic tenor is too flighty to hold up such lofty ideas. Thoughts that go beyond eye candy entertainment float in and out of the narrative without getting a chance to lodge themselves in the plot." Taran Adarsh wrote that the film "has tremendous youth appeal and with slight trimming, it can carve a niche for itself".
