= Dimple Jhangiani =

Indian actress

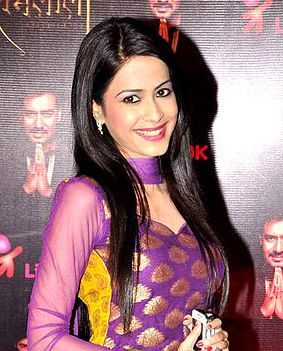
- Dimple Jhangiani at the red carpet of Life Ok's Ramleela.
- Born: India
- Other names: Dimple Jhangiani Asrani; Anaisha Asrani
- Occupations: Model, Actress
- Years active: 2006–2017
- Spouse: Sunny Asrani (m. 2016)

Dimple Jhangiani (born 24 February 1990, in India) is an Indian television actress. Her first appearance in Tellywood began with her playing the role of Kanya in the serial Kuchh Is Tara on Sony Entertainment Television. Dimple Jhangiani had joined Kis Desh Mein Hai Mera Dil and played the role of Sanjana as Harshad Chopda's (Prem) close friend. She also played RajKumari Sandhya in Raja Ki Aayegi Baraat. She played the role of Nimrit in Life OK's Amrit Manthan as the lead but she was replaced by Ankita Sharma due to the story. After her exit from Amrit Manthan she did a short telefilm on StarPlus, Teri Meri Love Stories.

She re-entered the show Amrit Manthan as Nimrit's twin sister Shivangi. After Amrit Manthan she roped on to play the character of Minty in Colors TV Mrs. Pammi Pyarelal. In 2013, Jhangiani played the role, Barkat Abdullah, in Beintehaa which aired on Colors TV.

After taking a break from getting married, Jhangiani returned to screens in Meri Durga which started airing on StarPlus in 2017.

== Personal life ==
Jhangiani is married to Sunny Asrani. Jhangiani, after getting married, changed her name to Anaisha Asrani because it brings good luck to the couple.

== Television ==
Year	Name	Role
2007	Kuchh Is Tara	Kanya Godhbole Nanda / Natasha
2008	Kis Desh Mein Hai Meraa Dil	Sanjana Rampal
2008	Raja Ki Aayegi Baraat	Sandhya
2009	Hum Dono Hain Alag Alag	Avantika "Avi" Trivedi
2012	Amrit Manthan	Rajkumari Nimrit Kaur Sodhi Agam Malik / Shivangi Kaur Sodhi Tej Malik
2013	Beintehaa	Barkat Abdullah/Bobby Mir Khan
2013	Welcome – Baazi Mehmaan Nawazi Ki	Herself
2013	Mrs. Pammi Pyarelal	Minty Rajbir Faujdar
2013	Yeh Hai Aashiqui	Manasvi
2014	Maharakshak: Aryan	Yuvika
2015	Tum Hi Ho Bandhu Sakha Tumhi	Avni Pethawala
2017	Meri Durga	senior district magistrate
