= Amrit Manthan =

Indian television series

- Intertitle
- Also known as: Bairi Behna (on Star Utsav)
- Created by: Director Kut's Productions
- Written by: Sonali Jaffar; Gaurav Sharma; Vibha Singh; M P Anamika
- Directed by: Romesh Kalra; Neeraj Baliyan
- Starring: Dimple Jhangiani; Ankita Sharma; Adaa Khan; Navi Bhangu; Karan Veer Mehra
- Country of origin: India
- Original language: Hindi
- No. of seasons: 1
- No. of episodes: 403

Production
- Producer: Rajan Shahi
- Production locations: Amritsar; Mumbai
- Editor: Sameer Gandhi
- Running time: 22 minutes
- Production company: Director Kut's Productions

Original release
- Network: Life OK
- Release: 26 February 2012 – 2 August 2013

Amrit Manthan (transl. The Changes of Amrit) is an Indian television soap opera that premiered on 26 February 2012 and ran until 2 August 2013 on Life OK. It tells the story of two sisters who become each other's enemies. This show was also broadcast as Bari Behna on Star Utsav.

The show took a 4-month leap in July 2012, a 2-month leap in December 2012, and a 7-year leap in February 2013.

== Plot ==
Amrit Manthan is the story of two sisters Amrit and Nimrit. Amrit is strong headed and egoistic in nature. On the other hand, Nimrit is kind hearted and always obeys Amrit. Amrit marriage got fixed with Agam. Later Nimrit and Tej came to know that Agam is trying to seek revenge from Amrit as she insults him 20 years ago and framed him being a thief in her birthday party. Nimrit reveals this to Amrit but she did not listen her and even insults her. On the day of marriage Agam kept condition that he wants to marry Nimrit leaving everyone shattered. After being forced by Rajmata Nimrit agreed to get married with Agam. And thus Amrit started hating Nimrit and decides to seek a revenge. Agam's mother accepts Nimrit as her daughter in law. And soon Agam and Nimrit fall in love with each other.Amrit continues to cause trouble in their lives. She tries several times to kill Nimrit but fails. Agam soon revealed Amrit's conspiracies against Nimrit in front of everyone, thus making Nimrit shattered. Amrit then calls Nimrit on chotti pahadi and pushes her from a cliff. After which Nimrit is presumed to be dead leaving Agam heart broken. But Nimrit was saved by a Rich business man Mr Oberoi.But her face is ruined and changed by plastic surgery. Mr Oberoi gave her the face of his dead daughter Natasha

Starting off as best friends, fate leads them to turn into enemies. Nimrit survives as Amrit attempts to kill her. But her face is ruined and changed by plastic surgery and she returns as Natasha Oberoi to seize everything that Amrit has taken from her. A lookalike of Nimrit (later revealed to be her long lost twin), named Shivangi, comes to town and helps Nimrit in her battle against Amrit and succeeds. Shivangi then leaves to pursue her career and marries

After a series of events, Nimrit thinks that her husband, Agam and Amrit have died, but they survive. Nimrit and Agam have a daughter named Gurbani. Amrit returns with Yug as her fiancé with an aim to ruin her sister's and Agam's lives. Amrit tries to incite Gurbani to rebel against her parents but fails. Eventually, the sisters set aside their difference and Amrit reforms herself. With Yug gone, Amrit marries Tej.

Agam is killed by Angad/Karan due to a misunderstanding. Angad forces Nimrit to marry him. Amrit is abducted by Yug who creates misunderstandings and has Amrit arrested. Rajjo helps rescue Amrit and exposes Yug as having tried to kill her and her family and has him arrested.

Amrit is pregnant with Tej's child. Nimrit accepts Angad as her husband and is pregnant with his child.

== Cast ==
=== Main ===
- Adaa Khan as double role
  - Princess Amrit Kaur Sodhi Malik: Nimrit and Shivangi's elder sister; Agam’s ex-fiancée; Tej's second wife; Jyoti's step mother. (2012–2013)
  - Rajjo: Amrit's Doppelganger (2013)
- Dimple Jhangiani as double role
  - Nimrit Kaur Sodhi Malik: Amrit and Shivangi's younger sister; Tej's former love interest; Agam's wife (before plastic surgery) (2012)
  - Shivangi Kaur Sodhi Malik: Nimrit's twin sister; Amrit's second sister; Tej's first wife; Jyoti's mother. (2012–2013)(Dead)
- Ankita Sharma as double role
  - Nimrit Kaur Sodhi Malik: Fake Natasha Obreoi; Amrit's younger sister; Shivangi's twin sister; Agam's widow; Gurbani's mother; Karan/Angand's wife. (after plastic surgery) (2012–2013)
  - Natasha Oberoi: Yug's girlfriend (2012)(Dead)
- Navi Bhangu as Agamdeep "Agam" Malik; Tej's cousin; Amrit’s ex-fiancée; Nimrit's husband; Gurbani's father. (2012–2013) (Dead)
- Wasim Mushtaq as Tej Malik: Agam's cousin; Nimrit's former love interest; Shivangi's widower; Amrit's second husband; Jyoti's father(2012–2013)
- Karan Veer Mehra as Yug Prakashan Mehra (2012–2013)
- Angad Hasija as Angad "Karan" Malik; Nimrit's second husband; Gurbani's stepfather (2013)
- Ananya Agarwal as Gurbani "Bani" Malik; Nimrit and Agam's daughter; Jyoti's cousin (2013)
- Dhriti Mehta as Jyoti Malik Shivangi and Tej's daughter; Bani's cousin (2013)

=== Recurring ===
- S.P. Lalwani as Mahinder Malik (2012–13)
- Amardeep Jha as Rajmata Manpreet Kaur Sodhi (2012-2013)
- Gaurav Nanda as Bhupinder Singh/Pritam Bakshi (2012)
- Mohan Kapoor as Soojam Oberoi (2012)
- Deepak Sandhu as Vishal Sehgal (2012)
- Kishwer Merchant as Simran Adhiraj Singh (2012)
- Danish Bhat as Adhiraj Singh (2012)
- Ananya Khare as Indu Chabiara (2013)
- Siddharth Vasudev as Rudraksh Singh (2012–13)
- Rushad Rana as Sarbjeet
- Rudra Kaushish
- Naveen Saini
- Amit Dhawan

=== Guests ===
- Parul Chauhan
- Kashmera Shah

== Crossover ==
The show had a crossover episode with Main Lakshmi Tere Aangan Ki. It also had a crossover episode with Dil Se De Dua...Saubhagyavati Bhava? on 12 September 2012.
