= Meri Durga =

Indian television series

- Genre: Soap opera
- Created by: Paperback Films
- Written by: Madhu Bastola; Raghuvir Shekhawat Pankhuri Gangwal
- Directed by: Ravindra Gautam
- Starring: Ananya Agarwal; Vicky Ahuja; Srishti Jain; Paras Kalnawat
- Country of origin: India
- Original language: Hindi
- No. of seasons: 1
- No. of episodes: 383

Production
- Producers: Ravindra Gautam; Pradeep Kumar (producer)
- Production locations: Haryana; Punjab; Mumbai
- Production company: Paperback Films

Original release
- Network: STAR Plus
- Release: 26 January 2017 – 17 March 2018

Meri Durga (translation: My Durga) is an Indian television series on Star Plus produced by Ravindra Gautam and Pradeep Kumar under the banner Paperback Films. It starred Ananya Agarwal, Vicky Ahuja, Srishti Jain and Paras Kalnawat. The show premiered on 26 January 2017 and went off air on 17 March 2018. The series is digitally available on Disney+ Hotstar.

== Plot ==
The story traces the journey of Durga Choudhary, a girl from Barwala, who aspires to become a runner. It revolves around the sensitive relationship of a father and his daughter. Highlighting the realities of life, Durga's father, Yashpal Choudhary works as a peon in a school in Haryana. His only dream is to educate his daughter Durga for a better future despite the odds. But despite trying hard to study and prove herself, Durga can't reach Yashpal's expectations. Yashpal works as a school peon and has a progressive viewpoint when it comes to educating a girl or a boy – unlike his relatives. Durga, on the other hand, is a lively, positive twelve-year-old who enjoys her childhood in and around the corners of Haryana. She loves running behind kites and climbing on the mango tree. Besides enjoying her childhood, Durga strives to fulfill her father's dream. But she cannot understand the calculations and hence finds herself confused between alphabets and numbers. Influenced by her coach, Rajveer Rana, Yashpal allows Durga to become an athlete and has her admitted to a school in Hisar. Durga emerges as the winner in the national race but the runner-up, Arti, has drugs mixed in her food. So Durga tests positive for drugs when she is tested and is expelled from running for five years. So her family faces the villagers' ire and even her best friend Sanjay Singh Ahlawat (SP) believes Arti and shuns Durga, stunning Durga, who then quits running forever.

=== 5 years later ===
After 5 years, Durga is now grown up and is responsible for the care of her family as well as her dreams. She meets SP again in college in Hisar. When SP finds out that Durga has joined the same college as him, he threatens her to leave the college as he still believes that Durga really consumed drugs to win the race, but the situation normalises when SP discovers the truth and they fall in love. Later Durga learns that SP's mother, Gayatri Devi, a politician and businesswoman from Hisar, had put drugs in her food five years earlier and exposes her to the media. So Gayatri misleads SP by attempting suicide, turning him against Durga. SP and Arti then plot against Durga. Amidst this, SP and Durga marry each other and Durga moves in with the Ahlawat family in Hisar. After being tortured by SP and his family, Durga learns that Gayatri was a national athlete Jassi who was expelled from the sports academy for getting involved in physical intimacy with her coach and helps her to keep it a secret. Arti tries to frame Durga in charges of sexual abuse of a doctor appointed by the sports authority but SP discovers this and takes the blame to save both Durga and Arti's dignity and in a weak moment Durga and SP consummate their marriage. SP meets with a deadly accident while dropping Durga at her state championship post, so he suspects Gayatri of foul play as she lies that she brought him to hospital (which actually Durga did and the former partially remembers because of his unconscious state due to severe head injury and bleeding at that time). He feigns insanity, then realises Durga's innocence and his mother's involvement in their suffering. He initially breaks all ties with his mother but reconciles after she realises her mistakes and encourages Durga to fulfill her dreams. The family coalesces and Durga begins to train for the nationals. Arti's father threatens to destroy Durga's family if she participates in the national race. He kidnaps her family on the day of the race but SP and Durga rescue them and Durga wins the race. Durga is admitted to the academy in Rohtak for being qualified for international championships. There SP is hired as a security guard due to their business being taken over by Arti's father in revenge. However a new competitor, Tanvi, the niece of the head director of the sports academy, plots to oust Durga from the academy to secure her first position. She even tries to defame Durga and SP for having an extramarital affair and tries to show Durga pregnant after learning of SP and Durga being married to each other as her final attempt. However Arti has a change of heart after her defeat at nationals and exposes her father's involvement with Tanvi as his attempt to retaliate against Durga. The series concludes with Durga succeeding in her attempts and SP and Durga regaining their family business and home from Purushottam's ownership and both the Chaudhary and Ahlawat families celebrating their victory in Hisar.

== Cast ==
=== Main ===
- Srishti Jain as Durga Choudhary: Annapurna and Yashpal's adopted daughter; Amrita's adopted sister; Sanjay's childhood friend turned wife (2017-2018)
  - Ananya Agarwal as Child Durga Choudhary (2017)
- Paras Kalnawat as Sanjay Singh Ahlawat: Gayatri and Neelkant's son; Gagan's brother; Durga's childhood friend turned husband (2017-2018)
  - Yash Mistry as Child Sanjay Singh Ahlawat (2017)
- Vicky Ahuja as Yashpal "Yash" Choudhary: Santoshi's son; Brijpal's brother; Annapurna's husband; Amrita's father; Durga's adoptive father (2017-2018)

=== Recurring ===
- Urfi Javed/Kate Sharma as Arti Singhania: Purushottam's daughter; Sanjay's childhood friend turned one-sided obsessive lover; Durga's arch rival (2017) / (2017–2018)
  - Arishfa Khan as child Arti (2017)
- Rajesh Shringarpure/Ankur Nayyar as Rajveer Rana: Durga's former coach (2017) / (2017–2018)
- Rashmi Shaw/Mrigrash Dubey as Annapurna Choudhary: Yashpal's wife; Durga's adoptive mother; Amrita's mother; Umang's grandmother; Shilpa and Bantu's aunt; Sanjay's mother-in-law (2017)/(2017–2018)
- Rajiv Khanna as Brijpal "Brij" Choudhary: Yashpal's younger brother; Santoshi's younger son; Sheela's husband; Shilpa and Bantu's father; Amrita and Durga's uncle (2017–2018)
- Jyotika Kukrety as Sheela Choudhary: Brijpal's wife; Shilpa and Bantu's mother; Amrita and Durga's aunt (2017–2018)
- Akshay Choudhary as Chote (2017)
- Amardeep Jha as Santoshi "Santo" Choudhary: Yashpal and Brijpal's mother; Durga's adoptive grandmother; Amrita, Shilpa and Bantu's grandmother; Umang's great-grandmother (2017–2018)
- Raj Sharnagat as Manohar (2017)
- Prince Singh as 2/2 Bhagwat (2017)
- Raquib Arshad as SRK (2017)
- Dolly Sohi as Gayatri Devi Ahlawat alias Jassi (track name): Neelakant's wife; Gagan and Sanjay's mother; Anjana and Durga's mother-in-law; a former athlete (2017–2018)
- Rajiv Kumar as Neelkant Singh Ahlawat: Gayatri's husband; Gagan and Sanjay's father; Anjana and Durga's father-in-law (2017–2018)
- Paras Sharma as Gagan Singh Ahlawat: Gayatri and Neelkant's elder son; Sanjay's elder brother; Anjana's husband; Durga's brother-in-law (2017–2018)
- Jiya Chauhan as Anjana Ahlawat: Gagan's wife; Sanjay's sister-in-law (2017–2018)
- Aishwarya Sharma Bhatt / Sonal Parihar / Swapnil Sengar as Amrita Choudhary: Yashpal and Annapurna's elder daughter; Durga's adoptive elder sister; Santoshi's granddaughter; Brijpal and Sheela's niece; Madhav's ex-wife; Umang's mother (2017) / (2017) / (2017–2018)
- Adhvik Mahajan as Madhav Deshmukh: Amrita's ex-husband; Umang's father (2017–2018)
- Advait as Umang Deshmukh: Amrita and Madhav's son; Durga's nephew; Annapurna and Yashpal's grandson; Santoshi's great-grandson (2017–2018)
- Ashna Kishore as Shilpa Choudhary: Brijpal and Sheela's daughter; Bantu's elder sister; Amrita and Durga's cousin; Annapurna and Yashpal's niece; Santoshi's granddaughter (2017–2018)
- Ramansh Bundela as Bantu Choudhary: Brijpal and Sheela's son; Shilpa's younger brother; Amrita and Durga's cousin; Annapurna and Yashpal's nephew; Santoshi's grandson (2017–2018)
- Shanaya Shivi as Kuljeet: Durga's friend (2017)
- Soham Jadhav as Young Manohar
- Sanjay Kaushik as Rishi (2017)
- Apala Bisht As Laxmi (2018)
- Rakhi Vijan as Subhadra (2017)
- Nandani Master as Srijita (2017)
- Mohsin as Bhagwat (2017)
- Mohammad Saud as Bansi (2017)
- Satya Tiwari as Samrat "Sam" Singh: Durga's former one-sided obsessive lover, Sanjay and Aarti's rival (2017)
- Ritu Bhagwani as Tanvi (2018)
- Urmila Sharma as Rohini (2017)
- Tariq Khan as Kadam (2017)
- Vishal C. Bhardwaj as Purushottam Singhania: Aarti's father (2017–2018)
- Dimple Jhangiani as senior district magistrate (2017)
- Nia Sharma as Palasha Trivedi: Durga's friend (2017–2018)
- Rishina Kandhari as Durga's teacher (2017)
- Apurva Agnihotri as Coach Bhagat (2017–2018)
- Anchal Sahu as Arti's friend (2017)

== Production ==
Speaking about the series, producer Ravindra Gautham said, "Meri Durga is the introspection of a father's mind and heart. We very rarely see the father's side onscreen. And the show also supports girl education which I feel is the need of the hour." Before its premiere, the series was promoted by the main cast in Ludhiana, Punjab on 16 January 2017.

The series was mainly filmed at Powai. However some scenes were also filmed at Haryana and Punjab.

In June 2017, the storyline took a leap of five years. Initially it starred Ananya Agarwal and Vicky Ahuja as young Durga and Yashpal. After the leap, it starred Srishti Jain as adult Durga, Paras Kalnawat as adult SP opposite Jain along with Ahuja.

Initially, Aalisha Panwar was cast to play adult Durga after the leap. But, on the last moment as she joined another show, Jain was cast. Vishal Bharadwaj was supposed to play Madhav. However as he was considered not suitable for the character in his first scene itself, Adhvik Mahajan was cast.
