= Hum Dono Hain Alag Alag =

Indian television series

- Hum Dono Hai Alag Alag
- Written by: Divy Nidhi Sharma; Munisha Rajpal
- Directed by: Dharmesh Shah
- Starring: See below
- Opening theme: "Hum Dono Hain Alag Alag" by Sachin Sanghvi
- Country of origin: India

Production
- Producers: Paresh Rawal; Swaroop Rawal; Hemal Thakkar
- Running time: approx. 20 minutes

Original release
- Network: STAR One
- Release: 13 July – 11 December 2009

Hum Dono Hain Alag Alag is an Indian television series that aired on STAR One from 13 July 2009 to 11 December 2009.Hum Dono Hain Alag Alag is a story of two odd couples, how they come together, their conflicts and how they work around the strange situation in which they find themselves.

== Plot ==
Varun "Tappu" (Yash Pandit), the oldest son of the Kothari family, has had his proposal of marriage rejected for the 22nd time. At the same time, his younger brother Aditya "Adi" (Manish Raisinghania) and his girlfriend, Mallika, are in a restaurant to celebrate the first anniversary of their relationship. Through all this, Avantika (Dimple Jhangiani) is at her house and describes her dream man to her friends and grandfather, Omkar. The show also introduces Rajshree (Harsha Khandeparkar), who is the Kothari family's neighbour and their daughter's best friend. She has had feelings for Adi since childhood.

Tappu sees Avantika at a restaurant and falls for her at first sight. He tells Adi that he is in love with Avantika but doesn't know her name. They plan a sale in their saree store where she is sure to come so that Tappu can find out her name.

Adi, with the help of Mallika, trains Tappu on how to impress a girl. Tappu is due to meet Mallika at a park but when she arrives Tappu, being nervous, walks away. Avantika notices Tappu but can't make out his face.

Avantika visits the sale in the saree store, and Tappu fails to talk to her. Avantika, who is still dreaming of the man in the park, visits his house by chance.

Meanwhile, with Adi totally in love with Mallika, his mother, Adu, sees that Rajshree loves Adi and makes her admit it. She proposes Rajshree as Adi's bride to his father, Mafatlal. He agrees thinking Anu is talking about Mallika. Rajshree is heartbroken when Adi declares Mallika as his life partner.

With their agreement, Mafatlal agrees to wed Adi and Mallika on the same day as Tappu and Avantika.

Tappu realizes that Avantika loves a part of Tappu, his avatar at the date (which doesn't exist anymore) and writes her a letter telling the truth. But the letter gets in the hands of Omkar before Avantika.

== Cast ==
- Yash Pandit as Varun "Tappu" Kothari
- Dimple Jhangiani as Avantika "Avi" Trivedi
- Manish Raisinghania as Aditya "Adi" Kothari
- Harsha Khandeparkar as Rajshree Goradia
- Mafatlal Kothari (Varun's father)
- Anu Kothari(Varun's Mother)
- Parvati "Paro" Kothari(Varun's younger sister)
- Jimit Trivedi as Gajendra "Gajju" Garodia (Varun's best friend)
- Mallika(Aditya's girlfriend)
- Omkar/Daddu (Avantika's grandfather)
