= Khwabon Ke Darmiyan =

- Genre: Soap opera
- Country of origin: India
- Original language: Hindi
- No. of seasons: 1
- No. of episodes: 305

Original release
- Network: DD National
- Release: 17 November 2014 – May 2, 2016

Khwabon Ke Darmiyaan is a TV show which aired on Doordarshan National on 17 November 2014 and This TV Shows Tagline is "Sach aur sapno se jhoojhti zindagi" The show has televised over 300 episodes in the prime time evening slot of 7:30 pm from Monday to Thursday.

== Plot ==
A group of women faces several challenging obstacles in their lives while trying to fulfil their dreams and aspirations.

== Cast ==
- Nishant Pandey as Nishant (Main Male lead);(Pratishtha's love interest but after her, he married Pam); (Ashtha's Best-Friend)
- Harsha Khandeparkar as Ashtha (Main female lead); (Aasman's love interest but after Aasman's death she married karan)
- Shashwat Saurabh Bhasin as karan (Second Male lead); (Ashta's husband;Ayesha fiance; Ballu's second son; Pam's brother; Rudra's half- brother)
- Latisha Surve as pam (Ballu's youngest daughter; Karan's sister;Rudra half-sister)
- Prakash Ramchandani as Ballu Khurana (Karan, Pam and Rudra's father;)
- Bidisha Ghosh Sharma as Dolly (Ballu khurana's wife; Pam and Karan's mother; Rudra's stepmother)
- Nikhil Pandey as Rudra (Alka and Ballu khuranna son; Pam and Karan's half-brother)
- Chandan Madan as Dr. Aasman Saxena (Ashtha's love interest)
- Maansi Jain as Ayesha (Karan's ex girlfriend; Rudra's fiancee)(Antagonist)
- Siddharth Gollapudi as Joseph Matthews
- Nissar Khan as Siddhant Kapoor
