= Munisha Rajpal =

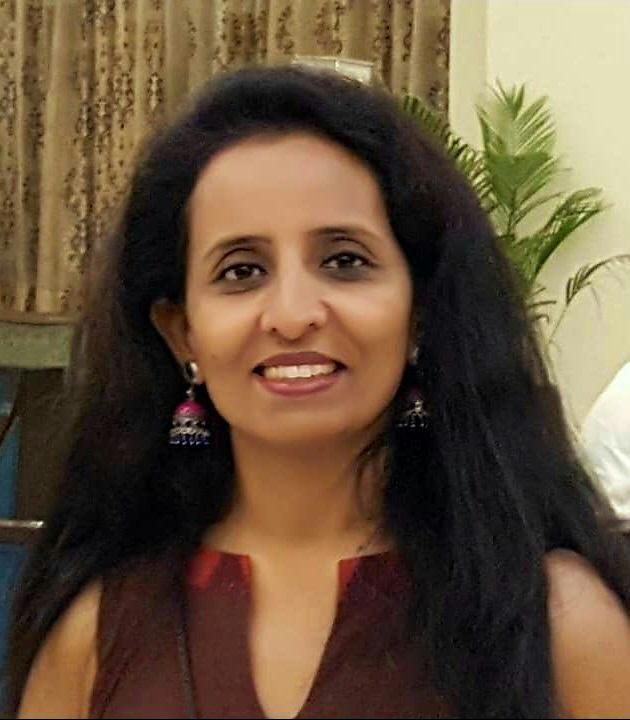
- Munisha Rajpal
- Occupations: Writer, Actress
- Years active: 1995 – present

Munisha Mahajan Rajpal is an author, screenwriter, and voice artist with over 31 years of experience in the entertainment and media industry. Her career spans works of fiction, non-fiction, television, theatre, and film. She is currently a dialogue writer for the Hindi television drama Lakshmi Niwas, airs on Zee TV.

== Career ==
Over the course of her career, spanning over three decades, Rajpal has written for several critically acclaimed television shows, including Yeh Rishta Kya Kehlata Hai, Shree, Saas Bina Sasural, Ek Packet Umeed, Dekha Ek Khwaab, Meet Mila De Rabba, Kashi – Ab Na Rahe Tera Kagaz Kora, Jasuben Jayantilaal Joshi Ki Joint Family, Hum Dono Hain Alag Alag, and Shaurya Aur Anokhi Ki Kahani.

In addition to her works, Rajpal is a voice artist, contributing to dubbing and script adaptation projects for various films and television.

She holds a master's degree in Indian Theatre from Panjab University, and has worked with the Theatre in Education division of the National School of Drama.

=== Television writer ===
- Ek Packet Umeed
- Jasuben Jayantilaal Joshi Ki Joint Family
- Meet Mila De Rabba
- Kashi – Ab Na Rahe Tera Kagaz Kora
- Shree
- Hum Dono Hain Alag Alag
- Saas Bina Sasural
- Dekha Ek Khwaab
- Yeh Ishq Hai
- Yeh Rishta Kya Kehlata Hai (2009–2022)
- Shaurya Aur Anokhi Ki Kahani
- Chikoo Ki Mummy Durr Kei on Star Plus
- Dil Diyaan Gallaan on Sony SAB
- Woh Toh Hai Albelaa on Star Bharat
- Lovely Lolla on YouTube
- Gudia Rani on Dangal (2024)
- Ishqa – Ishqa on YouTube
- Marjaani 2026 YouTube
- Chalo Bulawa Aya Hai, Mata Ne Bulaya Hai on Sony TV
- Lakshmi Niwas (2026–present) on Zee TV

== Awards ==
Year	Award	Category	Result	Role	Work	Notes
2014	Star Guild Awards	Best Writer	Won	Story & Dialogue Writer	Yeh Rishta Kya Kehlata Hai	
2022	Screenwriters Association	Best Writer	Nominated	Dialogue Writer	Woh Toh Hai Albelaa	
