= Vatoli communal violence 2008 =

Roits in Adilabad district, Telangana, India in 2008

Vatoli communal violence and arson
- Location: Vatoli village, Adilabad district, undivided Andhra Pradesh, India
- Date: 12 October 2008
- Attack type: Communal violence, arson, targeted attack
- Deaths: Entire family burned alive
- Victim: One Muslim family (exact number unspecified)
- Perpetrators: Nine members of Hindu Vahini (initially arrested; later acquitted)
- Verdict: Case quashed by Adilabad District Sessions Court due to lack of technical and scientific evidence
- Convictions: None

Vatoli is a village in Telangana state of India. It was in news when it witnessed communal riots and tension in 2008 when all members of a Muslim family were burned by miscreants. Vatoli was then part of Adilabad district of undivided Andhra Pradesh.

The Vatoli incident evoked strong condemnation from all political parties including the Telugu Desam, Telangana Rashtra Samithi, Congress and the BJP. The then Andhra Pradesh government ordered a magisterial inquiry into the incident of burning alive of a family but no subsequent corrective development took place later.

Adilabad District Sessions Court judge Aruna Sarika quashed the case against the nine accused arrested in this connection, all members of Hindu Vahini due to lack of proper technical and scientific evidence produced by the Indian investigation agency CB CID.
