= Ananya Agarwal =

Indian television child actress (born 2004)

- Born: Mumbai, India
- Occupation: Child actress
- Years active: 2009–present

Ananya Agarwal (born 21 January 2004) is an Indian television child actress.

== Career ==
Ananya made her debut with Tujh Sang Preet Lagai Sajna as Prerna. She played the role of Gurbani, daughter of Nimrit and Agam, in Amrit Manthan on Life OK. Ananya Agarwal joined Zee TV's Bandhan to play the role of Darpan.

== Filmography ==
=== Television ===
Year	Title	Role	Ref.
2009	Tujh Sang Preet Lagai Sajna	Prerna	
2010	Sabki Laadli Bebo		
2010	Yahan Main Ghar Ghar Kheli		
2011	Iss Pyaar Ko Kya Naam Doon?		
2011	Ek Nayi Chhoti Si Zindagi	Chutki	
2012	Kya Huaa Tera Vaada	Young Rano Singh	
2012–2013	Amrit Manthan	Gurbani "Bani" Malik	
2013	Mahabharat	Malini	
2013	Devon Ke Dev...Mahadev	Young Mhalsa	
2013	The Adventures of Hatim	Princess	
2014	Bandhan	Young Darpan Karnik	
2015–2016	Siya Ke Ram	Young Sita	
2017	Meri Durga	Young Durga	
2018	Roop - Mard Ka Naya Swaroop	Young Jigna Singh Vaghela	
2020–2021	Lockdown Ki Love Story	Sneha Jaiswal	

=== Films ===
Year	Title	Role	Language	Ref.
2019	Majili	Meera	Telugu	
2024	Maharaj	Devi	Hindi	
