= Panchur =

- village
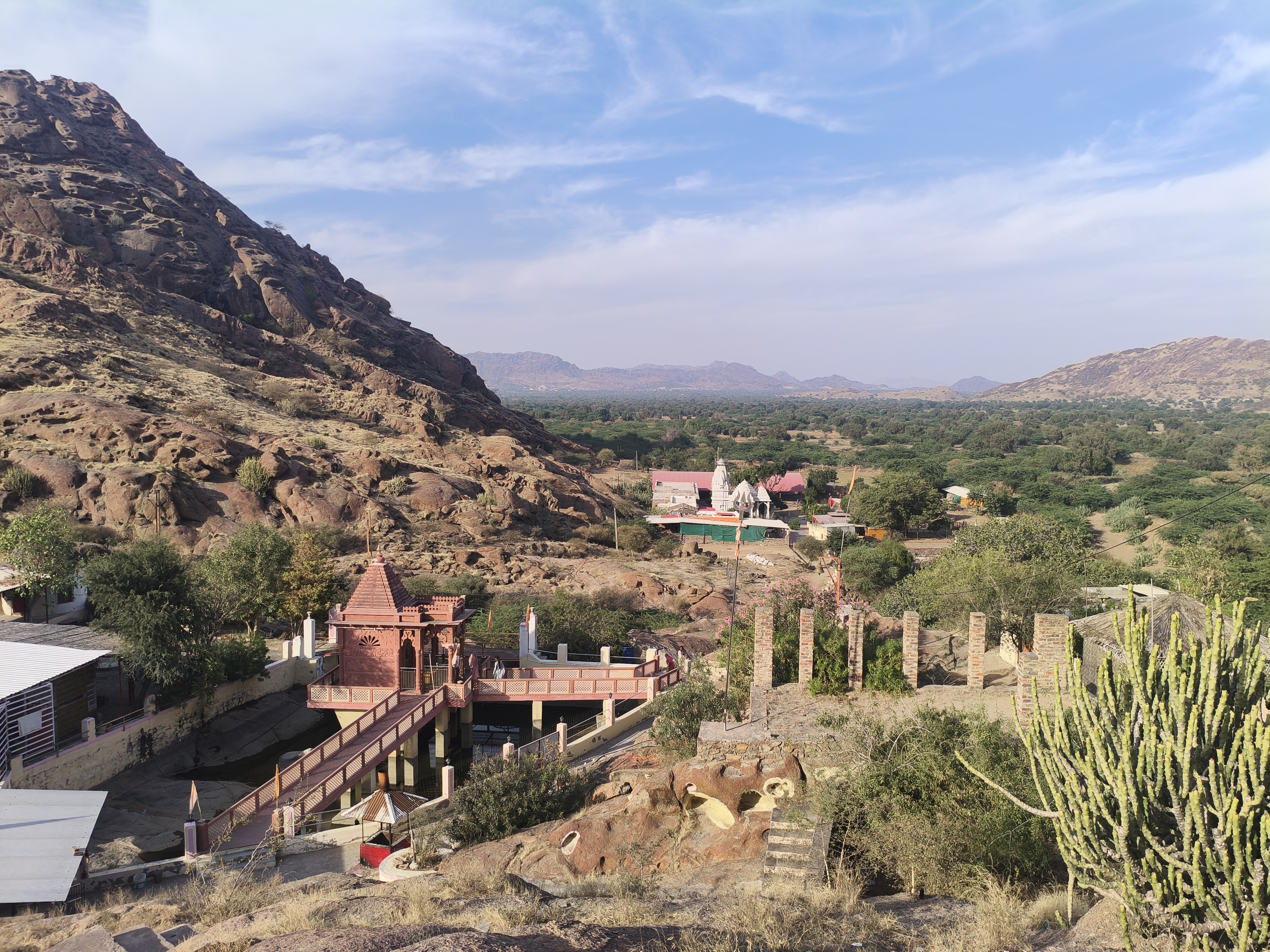

- Location in Uttarakhand, India Panchur (India)
- Coordinates: 29°57′24″N 78°26′16″E
- Country: India
- State: Uttarakhand
- District: Pauri Garhwal

Languages
  - Official: Hindi
- Time zone: UTC+5:30 (IST)
- Vehicle registration: UK
- Website: uk.gov.in

Panchur is a village in the Pauri Garhwal district of Uttarakhand. The village is known as the ancestral home of Uttar Pradesh Chief Minister Yogi Adityanath.

== Demographics ==
Panchur village has population of 175 of which 76 are males while 99 are females per 2011 Indian census.

== Notable people ==
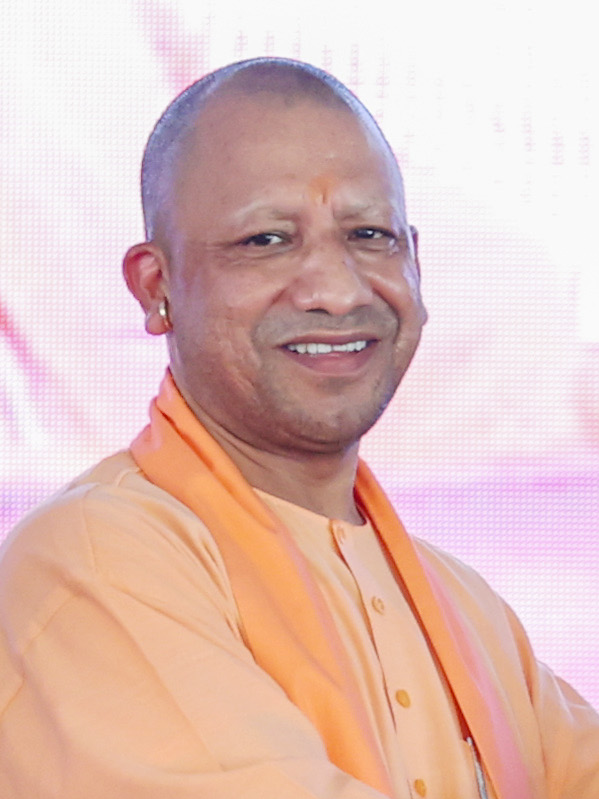
Yogi Adityanath

- Yogi Adityanath, Bharatiya Janata Party (BJP) leader and Chief Minister of Uttar Pradesh was born in Panchur.
