= Bharatiya Janata Party: Past, Present and Future =

2019 non-fiction book by Shantanu Gupta

- Author: Shantanu Gupta
- Language: Indian English
- Genre: Non-fiction, political
- Published: 5 December 2019
- Publisher: Rupa publications
- Publication place: India
- Pages: 416
- ISBN: 978-9353337827

Bharatiya Janata Party: Past, Present and Future – Story of the World's Largest Political Party is the non-fiction book written by Shantanu Gupta and published by Rupa Publications in 2019. The book deals with the history and contemporary politics of the Bharatiya Janata Party, the largest political party in India. The book is included in the curriculum of undergraduate students studying South Asian Studies at Islamic University of Indonesia.

== Reception ==
T C A Srinivasa Raghavan, writing for Business Standard, called the book as "calm, unhurried and adjective-free narration" of why BJP is an ideological alternative to the Left. With a reference of the book, The Rahnuma Daily, Indian newspaper, wrote that book looks like "honest attempt of the author" to documentise the history and contemporary politics of the BJP. The book is included in the curriculum of undergraduate students studying South Asian Studies at Islamic University of Indonesia.
