= Yash Mistry =

Indian child actor

- Born: Mumbai, India
- Occupation: Child actor
- Years active: 2013–present

Yash Mistry is an Indian child actor who has appeared in television serials. He has made his acting debut in 2013 with Sony TV channel’s historical serial Bharat Ka Veer Putra – Maharana Pratap as Kunwar Vikram. He also played a child lead role of Aditya Rawat in the Colors TV serial Udaan. In 2015 he played the role of little Ram in the mythological series Siya Ke Ram. He played the role of young Sanjay Prince in Meri Durga.

== Filmography ==
Show	Year	Role	Notes
Bharat Ka Veer Putra – Maharana Pratap	2013-2014	Kunwar Vikram	Shown on Sony TV
Mahabharat	2013-2014	Young Balaram	Shown on Star Plus
Udaan	2014-16	Aditya Rawat	Shown on Colors TV
Siya Ke Ram	2015	Young Rama	Shown on Star Plus
Mere Haaniya	2015	Young Deep	Debut Punjabi film
"Meri Durga"	2017	Young Sanjay Prince	Shown on Star Plus
