= Yogi Adityanath: The Rise of a Saffron Socialist =

Biography book by Pravin Kumar (2017)

Yogi Adityanath: The Rise Of A Saffron Socialist
- Biography's Cover
- Author: Pravin Kumar
- Language: English
- Genre: Biography
- Publisher: Times Group Books
- Publication date: 26 November 2017
- Publication place: India
- Media type: Print (Paperback)
- Pages: 216
- ISBN: 978-93-86206-56-5

Yogi Adityanath: The Rise Of A Saffron Socialist is a biography on Uttar Pradesh chief minister Yogi Adityanath authored by The Times of India Resident Editor in Lucknow, Pravin Kumar. It traces the journey of transformation and evolvement of Ajay Mohan Singh Bisht from Pauri in Uttarakhand to Yogi Adityanath of Goraksha Peeth in Gorakhpur, to the Parliament of India in New Delhi, and finally to the chief minister's post in Lucknow. The book is published by Times Group Books. The first copy of the book was presented to Yogi Adityanath on 24 November 2017. The book was released at the Times Literature Festival in New Delhi on 26 November 2017.
