= Yogi Adityanath =

Chief Minister of Uttar Pradesh since 2017

- Adityanath in 2026

Chief Minister of Uttar Pradesh
- Incumbent
- Assumed office 19 March 2017
- Governor: Ram Naik; Anandiben Patel
- Deputy: Brajesh Pathak (since 2022); Keshav Prasad Maurya (since 2017); Dinesh Sharma (2017–2022)
- Preceded by: Akhilesh Yadav
Additional ministries
List
- Home and Confidential
- Appointment and Personnel
- General Administration
- Cabinet Affairs
- Information and Public Relations
- Housing
- Revenue
- Mining and Geology
- Institutional Finance
- Planning
- Programme Implementation
- Relief and Rehabilitation
- Protocol
- Sainik Welfare
- Prantiya Raksha Dal
- Civil Aviation
- Law
- Food Safety and Drug Administration
- Other departments not allotted to any minister

Member of the Uttar Pradesh Legislative Assembly
- Incumbent
- Assumed office 10 March 2022
- Preceded by: Radha Mohan Das Agarwal
- Constituency: Gorakhpur Urban
- Majority: 1,03,390

Member of the Uttar Pradesh Legislative Council
- In office 18 September 2017 – 22 March 2022
- Preceded by: Yashwant Singh
- Succeeded by: Daya Shankar Mishra
- Constituency: Elected by the MLAs

Member of Parliament, Lok Sabha
- In office 5 March 1998 – 21 September 2017
- Preceded by: Mahant Avaidyanath
- Succeeded by: Praveen Kumar Nishad
- Constituency: Gorakhpur, Uttar Pradesh

Leader of the House of Uttar Pradesh Legislative Assembly
- Incumbent
- Assumed office 25 March 2022
- Speaker: Hriday Narayan Dikshit; Satish Mahana
- Preceded by: Keshav Prasad Maurya (Note: Yogi Adityanath was MLC during his first term and his deputy Maurya was Leader of the House in Assembly during that time.)

Personal details
- Born: Ajay Mohan Singh Bisht; 5 June 1972 (age 54) Panchur, Uttar Pradesh, India (present-day Uttarakhand)
- Party: Bharatiya Janata Party
- Education: Hemwati Nandan Bahuguna Garhwal University (BSc, Mathematics)
- Occupation: Politician; monk
- Cabinet: Yogi Adityanath I; Yogi Adityanath II
- Website: Official Website; UP CM official
- Nickname: Bulldozer Baba

Religious life
- Religion: Hinduism
- Denomination: Shaivism
- Temple: Gorakhnath Math
- School: Yoga
- Lineage: Guru Gorakhnath
- Sect: Nath Sampradaya
- Ordination: 12 September 2014

Religious career
- Teacher: Mahant Avaidyanath
- Post: Mahant
- Period in office: 2014–present
- Predecessor: Mahant Avaidyanath

Yogi Adityanath (born Ajay Mohan Singh Bisht; 5 June 1972) (Note: The date of birth is 5 June 1972, but his birth name is variously reported as "Ajay Mohan Bisht", or "Ajay Singh Bisht".) is an Indian Hindu monk and politician. A member of the Bharatiya Janata Party, Adityanath has served as the chief minister of Uttar Pradesh since 2017. He is the state's longest-serving chief minister and the first to hold the office for two consecutive terms.

Previously, Adityanath served as a member of India's parliament for almost two decades, from 1998 until 2017. At the age of 26, he became one of the youngest Indian parliamentarians in 1998 and went on to win the next five consecutive terms from Gorakhpur Lok Sabha constituency. In 2017, he moved from national to state politics and was appointed chief minister of Uttar Pradesh. Initially, in 2017, he became a member of the UP legislative council. Subsequently, in 2022, he became a member of the state legislative assembly, having won the election from the Gorakhpur Urban Assembly constituency.

Adityanath is also the mahant (head priest) of the Gorakhnath Math, a Hindu monastery in Gorakhpur, a position he has held since September 2014 following the death of Mahant Avaidyanath, his spiritual Guru. He founded the Hindu Yuva Vahini, a now defunct Hindutva youth militia. He is commonly described as a Hindu nationalist and a social conservative. Adityanath was placed 5th in 2023 and 6th in 2024 on the list of India's most powerful personalities, conducted by the Indian Express.

== Early life and education ==
Yogi Adityanath was born as Ajay Mohan Singh Bisht on 5 June 1972 in Masalgaon, (Note: Adityanath is alternatively reported by some sources to have been born in Panchur) where his father was posted at the time, in Uttarkashi district, Uttar Pradesh (now Uttarakhand) to a Garhwali Rajput family. His late father, Anand Singh Bisht, was a forest ranger. (Note: Anand Singh Bisht died on 20 April 2020 in AIIMS Hospital New Delhi.) His late mother, Savitri Devi, who passed away in November 2026, was a stay-at-home mother. He was the fifth born in the family, among four brothers and three sisters. At six-months-old, Bisht and his family left Masalgaon, and Bisht spent the next fourteen years of his life in Panchur in Pauri Garhwal, which is his family's ancestral village.

Ajay Bisht studied at the Government Primary School in Thangar until Class 8. (Note: Bisht is also alternatively listed as studying in Thangar until Class 5 in some sources.) As his school in Thangar did not include any classes higher than the eighth, he then had to go to Chamakhot to study in Class 9. When his father, who often had to move between postings, worked as a ranger with the Gaja forest department, Bisht relocated there as well in 1986, attending the Government Inter College, Gaja, Tehri Garhwal. After completing Class 10 in Gaja, he moved to Rishikesh to complete Classes 11 and 12 at the Shri Bharat Mandir Inter College, which is run by mahants of the Bharat Mandir Trust, while living with his elder brother, Manendra Bisht. There, he decided to study PCM (Physics, Chemistry, and Mathematics) alongside English and Hindi. While at Shri Bharat Mandir Inter College, he frequently participated in Vad-Vivad Manch (lit. 'debate platform') sessions, which were organised by the school, and through them earned a reputation as a good orator among his teachers. He completed Class 12 in 1989, and that same year joined the Pitambar Dutt PG Government College in Kotdwar, continuing his studies in PCM. Despite Bisht's brother-in-law, who was a member of the Student's Federation of India (SFI), encouraging him to join the SFI, Bisht instead joined the Akhil Bharatiya Vidyarthi Parishad (ABVP), and became active in student politics at his college. In 1992 he contested in PG Government College's student body elections for the position of secretary, but was denied the ABVP ticket. Bisht then tried running as an independent, but lost the elections. After graduating from his college in Kotdwar, he completed his bachelor's degree in mathematics at the Hemwati Nandan Bahuguna Garhwal University in Srinagar in the summer of 1992.

In 1990, Bisht briefly met Mahant Avaidyanath, the chief of the Gorakhnath Math and a key leader in the Ram mandir movement, during the mahant's tour across India in support of the Ram Janmabhoomi movement. As the Ram mandir movement grew in intensity, Bisht, who supported the movement, would begin to make multiple trips to Gorakhpur to meet with Mahant Avaidyanath, both before and after his graduation from HNB Garhwal University. During one of his visits in 1993, Bisht was told by Mahant Avaidyanath that he was a born yogi and that he was destined to come to Gorakhpur one day. During a later visit in May of that year, Mahant Avaidyanath asked Bisht to join the Gorakhnath Math as a disciple of his. Some months later, Avaidyanath was admitted to AIIMS New Delhi for medical treatment, and Bisht came to visit him to look over him while he was in the hospital. There, Avaidyanath once more urged Bisht to join the Gorakhnath Math, as due to the mahant's poor health he needed to appoint a disciple to one day serve as his future successor. In November 1993, Bisht, heeding Avaidyanath's words, left Uttarakhand to move to Gorakhpur and join the Gorakhnath Math without telling his parents, who were under the impression that he was going to Gorakhpur to find work. On 15 February 1994, on Vasant Panchami, Bisht was given his diksha and made a Nath Panth yogi by Avaidyanath, with Bisht, now Yogi Adityanath, becoming a disciple of his, as well as his appointed successor.

Adityanath's parents only found out about their son's initiation in the newspaper a few months later, and booked the next available train to Gorakhpur to see him. His parents were greatly displeased by their son's decision to become a sanyasi, and were not calmed until Adityanath was able to convince them to speak with Mahant Avaidyanath on the phone, who was able to console them. After his initiation in Gorakhpur, Adityanath often visited his ancestral village, establishing a school there in 1998.

By 1998, Adityanath was already in charge of the affairs of Gorakhnath Math through his role as designated uttaradhikari (heir) of the monastery, with his guru, Avaidyanath, having gone into retirement. Adityanath was promoted to the rank of Mahant (high priest) of the Gorakhnath Math after the death of Avaidyanath on 12 September 2014. He was made Peethadhishwar (Head Seer) of the Math amid traditional rituals of the Nath sect two days later.

== Early political career ==
Adityanath belongs to a specific tradition of Hindutva politics in Uttar Pradesh that can be traced back to the Mahant Digvijay Nath. Both Digvijay Nath and his successor Mahant Avaidyanath belonged to the Hindu Mahasabha and were elected to the Parliament on that party's ticket. The head priest (Mahant) of the Gorakhnath Math, a prominent Hindu temple, Mahant Avaidyanath switched to the BJP in 1991, but nevertheless maintained significant autonomy. Four years after Adityanath was designated Avaidyanath's successor, he was elected to the Lower House of the Indian Parliament (the Lok Sabha). Avaidyanath is known as the mentor and guru of Adityanath.

Adityanath became involved in local politics soon after his religious initiation at Gorakhnath Math. In 1995 he participated in a meeting in Jangal Kauria with Shiv Pratap Shukla, who was the MLA representing Gorakhpur Urban at the time, Sheetal Pandey, and ten others in violation of prohibitory orders issued by the district government, for which Adityanath and the other participants were charged under section 188 of the IPC at the Pipiganj police station on 27 May 1995. Adityanath also organised meetings of the Shri Ram Janmabhoomi Mukti Yagya Samiti for Mahant Avaidyanath. In 1996, Adityanath began managing Avaidyanath's election campaign for the 1996 Indian general election. With Avaidyanath retiring from politics in 1998, Adityanath took his guru's place in the general election of that year. Adityanath was elected as a Member of Parliament from Gorakhpur for the first time in 1998 during the 12th Lok Sabha at the age of 26; he was its youngest member at that time. He won by a margin of more than twenty thousand votes. He was elected to Parliament for five consecutive terms, that is, in the 1998, 1999, 2004, 2009 and 2014 elections.

Adityanath's attendance in the Lok Sabha was 77% and he asked 284 questions, participated in 56 debates and introduced three private member Bills in the 16th Lok Sabha. Adityanath had also said in the Lok Sabha on 13 August 2014, that who is communal should be a topic of discussion and that whoever claims that My God, my Prophet is the most superior is communal; to say that the only people who are entitled to life are those who believe in him which is not allowed by the Hindu philosophy of life, the guiding principle of which is "live and let live." After his first electoral win, Adityanath started his own youth organisation, the Hindu Yuva Vahini, which came to be known for its activities in eastern Uttar Pradesh and was instrumental in Adityanath's meteoric rise. There have been recurrent tensions between Adityanath and the BJP leadership over the allocating election tickets. However, the BJP has not let the tensions mount because Adityanath has served as a star campaigner for the party.

In 2006, he took up links between Nepali Maoists and Indian Leftist parties as a key campaign issue and encouraged Madhesi leaders to oppose Maoism in Nepal. In January 2007, Adityanath along with other BJP leaders had gathered to mourn the death of a man who was killed because of religious violence. He and his supporters were subsequently arrested by the police and lodged in Gorakhpur jail on the charges of disturbing peace and violating prohibitory orders. His arrest led to further unrest during which several coaches of the Mumbai bound Mumbai–Gorakhpur Godan Express were burnt, allegedly by protesting Hindu Yuva Vahini members. The day after the arrest, the District Magistrate and the local police chief were transferred and replaced.

=== Murder case dismissal ===
In 1999, Adityanath was charged in connection with the death of head constable Satya Prakash Yadav, who was the personal security officer of Samajwadi Party leader Talat Aziz. The incident occurred in Maharajganj when Adityanath and his supporters reportedly opened fire at Aziz and his supporters. The CB-CID (Crime Branch-Criminal Investigation Department) conducted an investigation and filed a final report that cleared Adityanath of the charges. In 2019, Allahabad High Court's special court for MPs and MLAs dismissed the 20-year-old murder case, upholding the CB-CID's findings and the CJM court's decision.

=== Relations with the BJP ===
In 1998, Yogi Adityanath was elected to the Indian Parliament after joining the BJP; however, there were reports of his strained relations with the state BJP leaders. It has also been alleged that he often derided and criticised the dilution of the Hindutva ideology by the BJP in the 1990s and early 2000s. Having established his independent power base in Eastern Uttar Pradesh, with the support of the Hindu Yuva Vahini and the Gorakhnath Math, he felt confident to be able to dictate terms to the BJP. When his voice was not heard, he revolted by fielding candidates against the official BJP candidates. The most prominent example was the fielding of Radha Mohan Das Agarwal from Gorakhpur on a Hindu Mahasabha ticket in 2002, who then defeated BJP Cabinet minister, Shiv Pratap Shukla by a wide margin. In 2007, Adityanath threatened to field 70 candidates for the state assembly against the BJP candidates. But he reached a compromise in the end. In the 2009 Parliamentary elections, Adityanath was rumoured to have campaigned against the BJP candidates who were then defeated.

Despite his periodic revolts, Adityanath has been kept in good humour by the RSS and the BJP leaders. The deputy prime minister L. K. Advani, the RSS chief Rajendra Singh and the VHP chief Ashok Singhal have visited him in Gorakhpur. During 22–24 December 2006, Adityanath organised a three-day Virat Hindu Mahasammelan at Gorakhpur at the same time as the BJP National Executive Meet in Lucknow. Despite the conflict, several RSS and VHP leaders attended the Mahasammelan, which issued a commitment to pursue the Hindutva goals despite the BJP's claimed "abandonment" of them.

In March 2010, he was among the few BJP leaders, who pushed for a discussion in the party on the women's quota issue, following Gopinath Munde's advocacy for OBC sub-quota within the Women's Reservation Bill.

In 2018, Adityanath supported and campaigned for fellow Hindu monk and BJP candidate Pratap Puriji Maharaj, the head of the Taratara math, in the Rajasthan state assembly election.

== Chief Minister of Uttar Pradesh (2017–present) ==
=== First term (2017–2022) ===
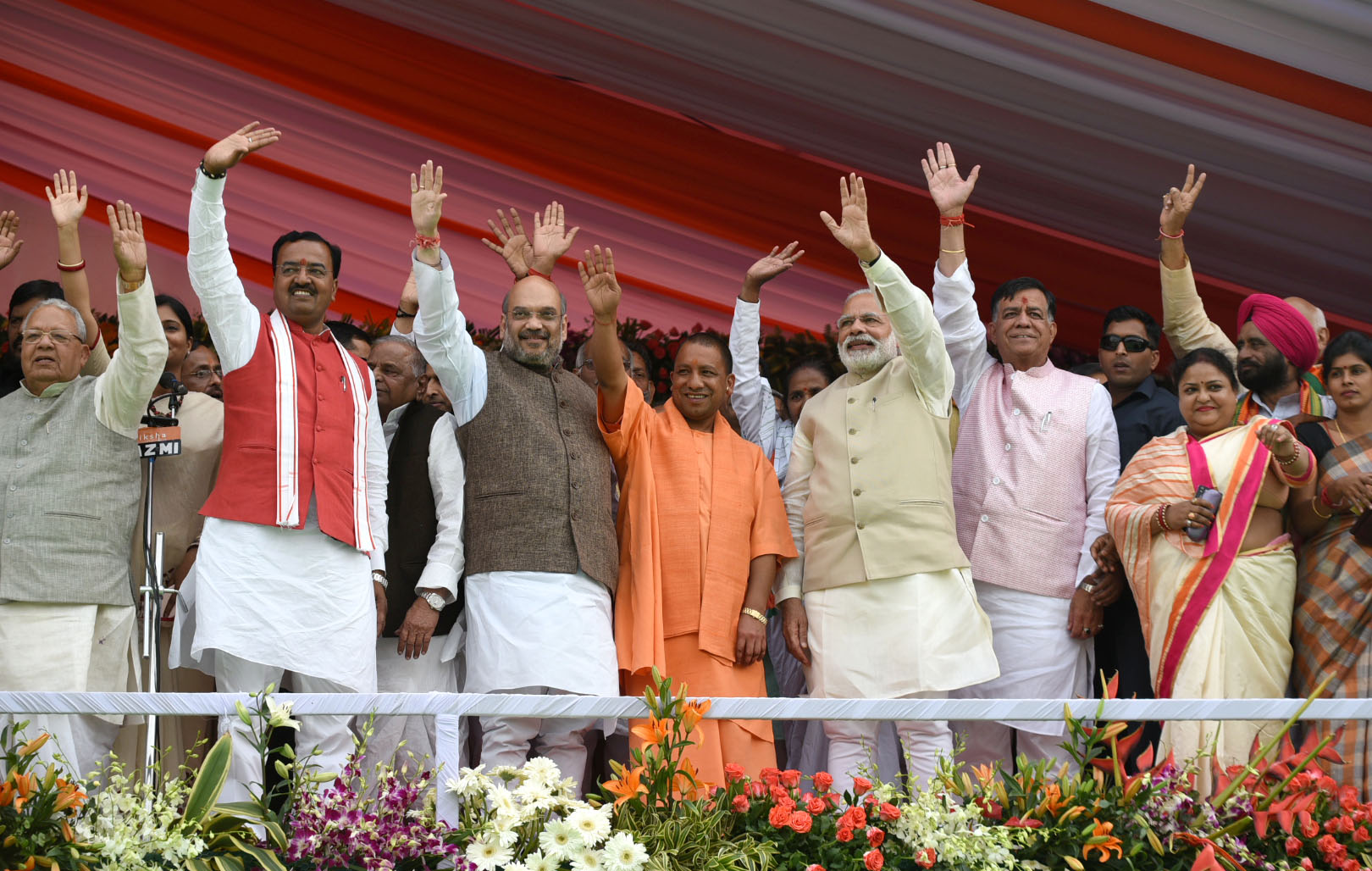
Prime Minister Narendra Modi and other Bharatiya Janata Party leaders at the swearing-in ceremony of Yogi Adityanath

Adityanath was a prominent campaigner for the BJP in the 2017 assembly elections in the state of Uttar Pradesh. The state government appointed him as chief minister on 18 March 2017; he was sworn in the next day, after the BJP won the assembly elections.

==== Ministry allocation ====
After becoming the chief minister of Uttar Pradesh, Adityanath kept around 36 ministries under his direct control, including Home, Housing, Town and country planning department, Revenue, Food and Civil Supplies, Food Security and drug administration, Economics and Statistics, Mines and Minerals, Flood control, Stamp and registry, Prison, General administration, Secretariat administration, Vigilance, Personnel and appointment, Information, Institutional finance, Planning, Estate department, Urban land, UP state reorganisation committee, Administration reforms, Programme implementation, National integration, Infrastructure, Coordination, Language, External aided project, Relief and Rehabilitation, Public Service Management, Rent Control, Consumer protection and Weights and measures.

In his first cabinet meeting, held on 4 April 2017, the decision was taken to forgive loans to nearly 87 lakh (8,700,000) small and marginal farmers of Uttar Pradesh, amounting to ₹363.59 billion (US$3.9 billion). For India's Independence Day celebrations in 2017, his government singled out Muslim religious schools, requiring them to provide video evidence that their students had sung the Indian national anthem.

==== Law and order ====
In 2017, his government ordered the withdrawal of around 20,000 "politically motivated" cases, including those against himself and other politicians.

Adityanath ordered the forming of quasi-vigilante anti-"romeo" squads. He imposed a blanket ban on cow-smuggling and a stay on UPPSC civil service exam results, exams and interviews until further order. He imposed a ban on the vices of tobacco, paan and gutka in government offices across the state, and compelled officials to pledge to devote 100 hours every year for the Swachh Bharat Mission. More than 100 "black sheep" policemen were suspended by the Uttar Pradesh police.

Since 2017, Adityanath had ordered the closing of many slaughterhouses. As a direct consequence, the tanneries that sourced raw leather from the slaughterhouses were impacted. Several tanneries were also ordered to be shut down. The tannery industry was estimated to be worth ₹50,0000 crore in 2017. The industry directly or indirectly gave employment to more than 10 lakh people. Since 2018, through executive orders, Adityanath had closed around 200 tanneries out of more than 400 that were active in Jajamau, Kanpur.

In the first 10 months of his first term, he conducted four police encounters per day. National Human Rights Commission issued a notice to the state government and a bench of three judges from the Supreme Court of India warned and issued notice to the Uttar Pradesh government in this case.

Committee Against Assault on Journalists found that 138 cases of persecution of journalists were registered under Adityanath's term in Uttar Pradesh between 2017 and February 2022.

After the Citizenship Amendment Act protests in Uttar Pradesh, he put up hoardings with names, photographs and addresses of protesters. Only after the order of the High Court, which called his government's action "shameless" and an "unwarranted interference in privacy", the posters were removed.

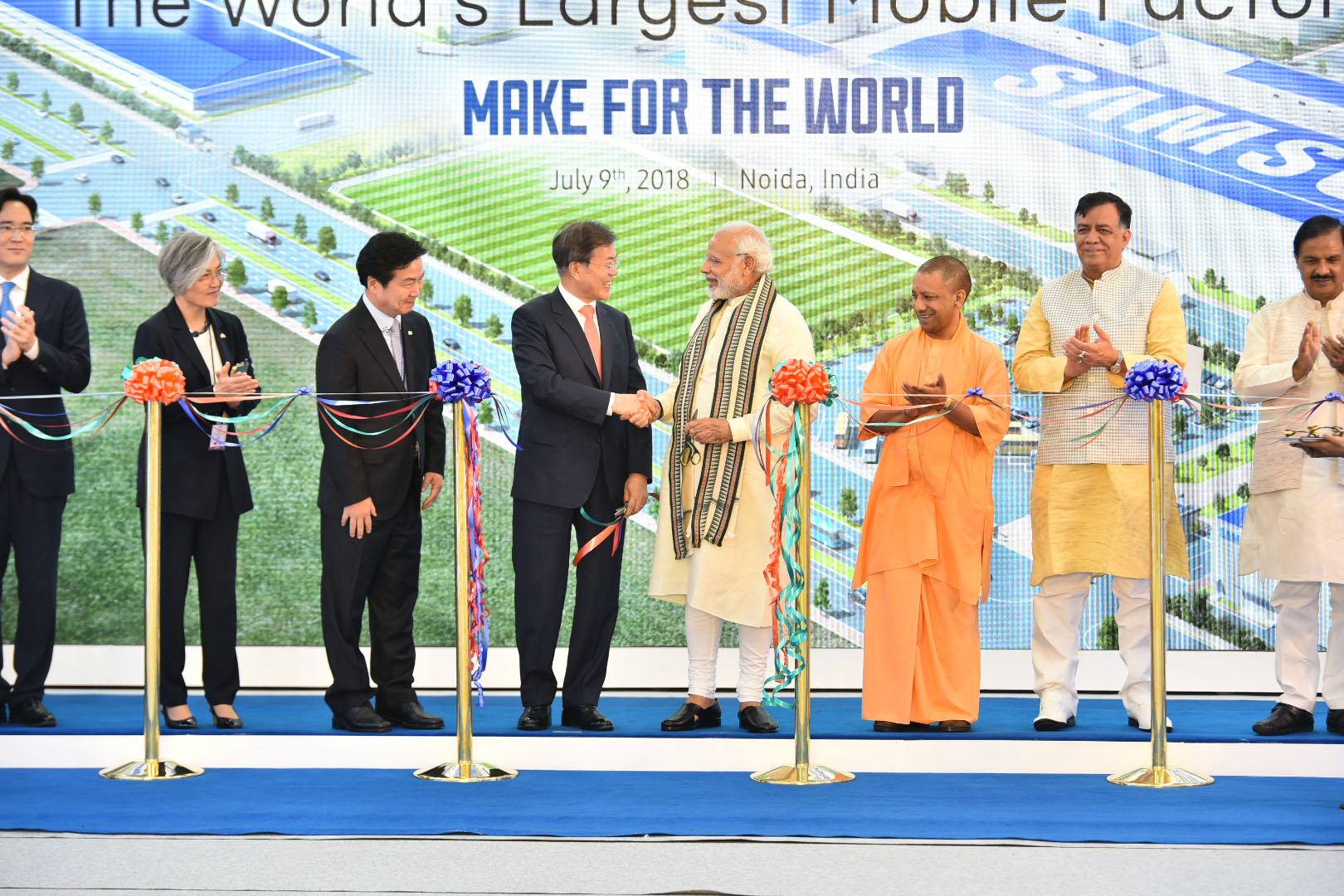
Yogi Adityanath along with Prime Minister Narendra Modi and Moon Jae-in, President of South Korea, inaugurating the Samsung manufacturing plant, the world's largest smartphone manufacturing factory, in Noida, Uttar Pradesh

==== Infrastructure development ====
In July 2018, Adityanath, along with Prime Minister Narendra Modi and Moon Jae-in, president of South Korea, inaugurated the world's largest smartphone manufacturing factory in Noida, Uttar Pradesh. His government was credited for making 50 megawatts of power and a 22-kilometre-long (14 mi) electricity line in a record four months for the Samsung mobile plant.

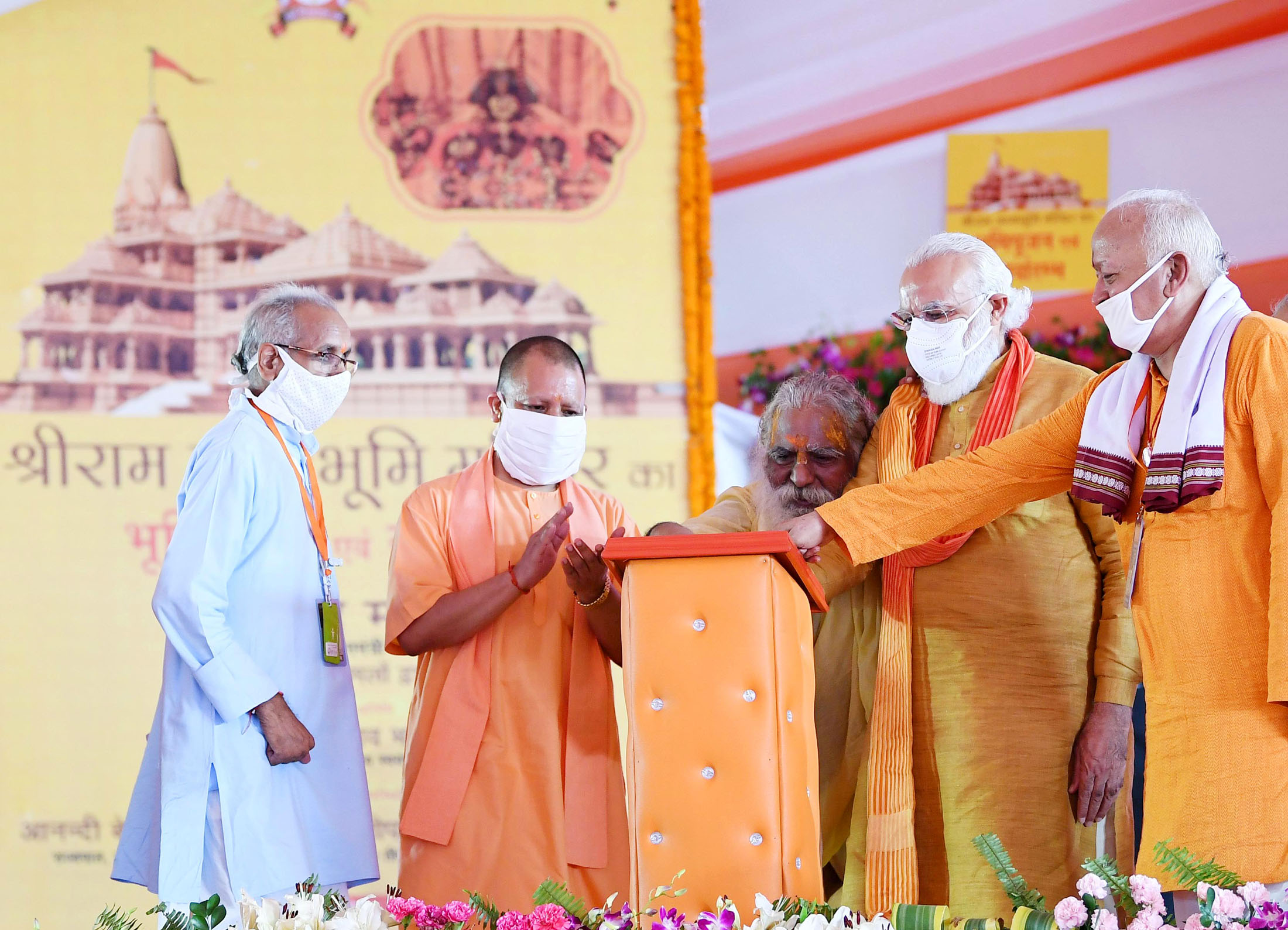
Narendra Modi, Yogi Adityanath, Mohan Bhagwat and Nrityagopal Das unveiling the plaque to lay the foundation stone of Ram Janmabhoomi Mandir, in Ayodhya on 5 August 2020

In November 2019, the government along with the Ministry of Defense laid the foundation stone of the Defence Industrial Corridor project in Jhansi. Adityanath held consultations with private firms in order to increase private investment in the defence corridor project. He subsequently inaugurated Defense Corridor in 26 February 2023. Uttar Pradesh government inked over 150 defence manufacturing contracts valued at Rs 24,000 crore in July 2024 for the UP Defence Industrial Corridor, spanning Lucknow, Kanpur, Jhansi, Aligarh, Chitrakoot, and Agra districts which will create an estimated 40,000 new jobs.

The New York Times relayed analysts' estimations of Adityanath as a candidate for Prime Minister of India in 2024, provided he "delivers on some fronts". In August 2020, India Today's "Mood of the nation" survey showed Adityanath as the best-performing chief minister in India.

==== Ordinance and bills ====
In September 2020, Adityanath asked his government to devise a strategy to prevent "religious conversions in the name of love", and even considered passing an ordinance for the same if needed. On 31 October, Adityanath announced that a Prohibition of Unlawful Religious Conversion Ordinance, 2020 to curb "Love Jihad" (Note: As of November 2020, Love Jihad is a term not recognised by the Indian legal system.) would be passed by his government.

The Uttar Pradesh state cabinet cleared Adityanath's ordinance on 24 November 2020. following which it was approved and signed by state Governor Anandiben Patel on 28 November 2020.

In July 2021, Adityanath introduced the UP population control draft bill 2021–2030. On the event of World Population Day, the chief minister unveiled the policy on reducing population growth for the forthcoming years. There were also several benefits announced based on the laid single-child and two-child policies. He said the state population policy focused on efforts to increase the accessibility of contraceptive measures issued under the Family Planning Programme and provide a proper system for safe abortion. This policy also received lots of reactions and criticisms from other political parties. It was said that this policy mainly focused on the upcoming general elections in the state. The opposition Congress in the state has called it a "political agenda" and the Samajwadi Party said it is "murder of democracy".

=== Second term (2022–present) ===
On 10 March 2022, with the announcement of the legislative assembly results, the BJP-led NDA alliance secured 273 seats with Adityanath winning his second term. The BJP was the first party to return to power consecutively after 37 years. He was only the third chief minister, in Uttar Pradesh's political history to complete a full 5-year term as the chief minister of the state after Mayawati of BSP and Akhilesh Yadav belonging to the Samajwadi Party.

In the buildup to the assembly elections, Adityanath successfully used a campaign with a bulldozer as its main image, earning him the nickname "Bulldozer Baba". The term had initially been used as a taunt by an opposition party. His speeches during the polls included hate speeches against Muslims, promoting religious polarisation and Hindu supremacy. Further, his speeches included the idea that the rights of Hindus are at odds with that of Muslims, where he repeatedly conflated Muslims with terrorists and criminals, and the opposition parties as appeasers of Muslims. Adityanath denied the accusations of the Samajwadi Party that the BJP is a sectarian party with a communal way of thinking, that the BJP's ideology is based on inclusivity and togetherness, not division and added that we believe in 'Sabka Saath, Sabka Vishwas (Together with all, trust of all)' and that the BJP's goal of "Sarve Bhavantu Sukhinah, Sarve Santu Niraamaya," which means "May all be happy, may all be free from illness," was emphasised by Chief Minister Yogi as a governing principle." He is seen as a potential successor of Prime Minister Modi by a large group of Hindu Nationalists across the country.

==== Allegations and criticism ====
Concerns were raised for alleged maladministration in the appointments and recruitment of candidates to various departments of government. The opposition leaders from Samajwadi Party as well as BJP's own allies like Anupriya Patel criticised the Yogi government time and again for sabotaging the rights of Other Backward Castes and Dalits. In a letter written to Uttar Pradesh government, Patel alleged that the appointment authorities under Adityanath government are labelling the OBC and SC, ST candidates as ineligible for appointment in the interview based appointment process to various departments of government.

The criticism also came from within the party and in 2023, Deputy Chief Minister Keshav Prasad Maurya wrote to the Appointment and Personnel department to publish the data of selection of candidates belonging to OBC, SC and ST communities to various departments of government.

Yogi Adityanath government was also criticised for malpractices in appointment of 69,000 teachers in state sponsored schools of Uttar Pradesh. Many candidates alleged that despite securing more marks than general caste candidates, they were placed in reserved quota and allotted the seats meant for reserved quota candidates, thus reducing their overall representation and increasing the representation of candidates belonging to general castes. In a reply in Uttar Pradesh Legislative Assembly, Adityanath government later admitted that mismanagement has taken place in the appointments, which was followed by subsequent decrees of Allahabad High Court on reviewing the result and republishing it after considering the quota rules properly.

Furthermore, Adityanath was also criticised for bulldozer action against properties and lands allegedly claimed by him to be owned by criminals and mafia across the state of Uttar Pradesh, including politicians with criminal cases against them.

== Political positions held ==
From	To	Position	Party
1998	1999	MP (1st term) in 12th Lok Sabha from Gorakhpur	BJP
1999	2004	MP (2nd term) in 13th Lok Sabha from Gorakhpur	BJP
2004	2009	MP (3rd term) in 14th Lok Sabha from Gorakhpur	BJP
2009	2014	MP (4th term) in 15th Lok Sabha from Gorakhpur	BJP
2014	2017	MP (5th term) in 16th Lok Sabha from Gorakhpur	BJP
2017	2022	Chief Minister of Uttar Pradesh (1st term) in 17th Uttar Pradesh Assembly: MLC (1st term) in Uttar Pradesh Legislative Council	BJP
2022	Present	Chief Minister of Uttar Pradesh (2nd term) in 18th Uttar Pradesh Assembly: MLA from Gorakhpur Urban Assembly constituency (1st term)	BJP

== Electoral history ==
=== Lok Sabha elections ===
Year	Constituency	Party	Votes	%	Result
1998	Gorakhpur	BJP	268,428	42.62	Won
1999	Gorakhpur	BJP	267,382	41.10	Won
2004	Gorakhpur	BJP	353,647	51.31	Won
2009	Gorakhpur	BJP	403,156	53.85	Won
2014	Gorakhpur	BJP	539,127	51.83	Won

=== Uttar Pradesh Legislative Assembly elections ===
Year	Constituency	Party	Votes	%	Result
2022	Gorakhpur Urban	BJP	165,499	66.18	Won

== In popular culture ==
In 2025, a biographical film titled Ajey: The Untold Story of a Yogi was announced, depicting his life. The film, inspired by Shantanu Gupta's book The Monk Who Became Chief Minister, explores his journey from a Nathpanthi monk to a prominent political leader and chief minister of Uttar Pradesh. The film was officially released on 19 September 2025.

Many other books have been written about Adityanath, which include Yogigatha: Yogi Adityanath Ki Jivangatha by Shantanu Gupta, which is the Hindi counterpart to his definitive biography, Lokhriday Samrat Yogi Adityanath: Darshan Evam Vikas Drishti by Amit Singh, Monk to Majesty: Biography of Yogi Adityanath by B.K. Chaturvedi and Yogi Adityanath: Religion, Politics and Power by Sharat Pradhan and Saurabh Shukla.

== Bibliography ==
- Haṭhayoga svarūpa evam sādhanā, Gorakhapura : Śrī Gorakshanātha Mandira, 2007, 148 p. On Hatha yoga.
- Adityanath, Yogi (2019). Rājayoga : svarūpa evaṃ sādhanā. Dillī. p. 192. ISBN 978-93-5322-406-6. OCLC 1102086331.

== See also ==
- The Monk Who Became Chief Minister
- Yogi Adityanath: The Rise of a Saffron Socialist

== Notes ==
Lok Sabha
Preceded by Mahant Avaidyanath	Member of Parliament for Gorakhpur; 1998–2017	Succeeded by Praveen Kumar Nishad
Political offices
Preceded by Akhilesh Yadav	Chief Minister of Uttar Pradesh; 19 March 2017 – Present	Incumbent
