= Wasna Ahmed =

Indian television actress

- Born: Kolkata, India
- Occupation: Actress
- Years active: 2007–2015

Wasna Ahmed is an Indian television actress. She made her debut with the role of Dhara in Kasautii Zindagii Kay. She also played titular character in Shree.

== Filmography ==
Films

- Kadhal Solla Aasai (Tamil) as Suchitra
- 2015 Palaandu Vaazhga

Television

- Kasautii Zindagii Kay as Dhara
- Kahe Naa Kahe as Kinjal
- Shree as Shree
- Kabhi Kabhii Pyaar Kabhi Kabhii Yaar as herself
- Dance India Dance as herself
- Aahat as Rani
- CID as Kashish
- Phulwa as Mahua

== Awards ==
- 2007 Indian Telly Awards Nominated for Best Fresh New Face.
