= Yash Pandit =

Indian television actor (born 1977)

- Born: Yashodhan Pandit; Mumbai, Maharashtra, India
- Occupations: Actor, model
- Years active: 1985–present
- Known for: Yeh Kya Ho Raha Hai?
- Spouse: Mahima Mishra (m. 2022)
- Relatives: Shraddha Pandit (sister); Shweta Pandit (sister)

Yashodhan Pandit is an Indian actor and model.

== Early life ==
He is the son of Vishwaraj Pandit and Swarna Pandit. She is the grand-niece of Indian classical vocalist and Padma Vibhushan awardee, Pandit Jasraj, father of Durga Jasraj. His younger sisters, Shraddha Pandit and Shweta Pandit, are Bollywood playback singers.

== Career ==
In his childhood, he also performed in Chetan Anand's Haathon Ki Lakeeren as a child artiste.

He has acted as a lead in films Rok Sako To Rok Lo, Yeh Kya Ho Raha Hai?, Mr. Hot Mr. Kool and Faltu, which won the National Award for best Welfare film, and has done a special appearance role in the 2016 film Loveshhuda. He also appeared in the TV serials Ghar Ki Lakshmi Betiyann as Siddharth, Kyunki Saas Bhi Kabhi Bahu Thi as Laksh Virani, Hum Dono Hain Alag Alag as Varun Kothari, and he did dance performances in a reality dance show Tyohaar Dhamaka on 9X. He has acted in Star Plus's Tere Mere Sapne. He played the male lead role of Satya in Life OK's Savitri - Ek Prem Kahani opposite Riddhi Dogra. Also did MTV's Splits Villa 8 as a celebrity contestant.

== Filmography ==
Year	Film	Role
1985	Ram Teri Ganga Maili	Ganga's Baby
1986	Haathon Ki Lakeeren	Bantu, a child
2002	Yeh Kya Ho Raha Hai?	Johnny
2004	Rok Sako To Rok Lo	Dev Verma
2006	Faltu	Faltu
2007	Mr. Hot Mr. Kool	Prem Amar 'Pat' Tripathi
2016	Loveshhuda	Vinayak Sengupta
2018	Nanhi Si Kali: Betiyaan	
2021	Sandeep Aur Pinky Faraar	Friend At The Party

=== Television ===
Year	Serial	Role
2006	Ghar Ki Lakshmi Betiyann	Siddharth
2008	Kyunki Saas Bhi Kabhi Bahu Thi	Laksh Virani
2009	Ek Din Achanak	Aman Mittal
2009	Hum Dono Hain Alag Alag	Varun Kothari
2009–2011	Tere Mere Sapne	Sarju
2012	Splitsvilla	Contestant
2013	Savitri – Ek Prem Kahani	Satyavan Rai Choudhary
2013	Savitri – Ek Prem Kahani	Veer
2016	Adaalat	Aarav Sharma
2016;2017	C.I.D	Karan/Aman
2019	Daayan (2019)	Dibang
2019	Mere Dad Ki Dulhan	KK
2021–2023	Ghum Hai Kisikey Pyaar Meiin	Dr. Pulkit Deshpande
2022–2023	Naagin 6	Vinay Ahlawat
2023–2024	Aangan – Aapno Kaa	Rakesh Tripathi
2024	Tulsi – Hamari Badi Sayani	Utkarsh Mathur
2025	Bade Achhe Lagte Hain 4	Kartik Iyer
