= Ankita Sharma =

Indian television actress (born 1987)

- Born: Ankita Sharma; 7 February 1987 (age 39)
- Occupations: Actress, Model
- Years active: 2009–present
- Known for: Baat Hamari Pakki Hai; Amrit Manthan
- Spouse: Mayank Sharma (m. 2015)
- Children: Panshul Sharma (son)

Ankita Sharma is an Indian television actress. She worked in Sony Entertainment Television's show Baat Hamari Pakki Hai as Sanchi Shravan Jaiswal, Amrit Manthan as Rajkumari Nimrit Sodhi Malik / Natasha Oberoi, Rangrasiya as Laila, and Chakravartin Ashoka Samrat as Noor Khorasan.

== Personal life ==
Sharma had pursued a course in classical dance and music. When she completed her course in 2008, she was awarded the Visharad degree. This degree was very important for her, as she always wanted to be a dance choreographer. Ankita became engaged to Mayank Sharma on 24 January 2015 and married him on 9 March 2015.

== Television ==
Year	Title	Role	Notes	Ref(s)
2009–2010	Agle Janam Mohe Bitiya Hi Kijo	Ratna		
2010–2011	Baat Hamari Pakki Hai	Sanchi Sharma / Sanchi Shravan Jaiswal	Episode 188	
2011–2012	Sawaare Sabke Sapne... Preeto	Manpreet Dhillon aka Preeto		
2012–2013	Amrit Manthan	Rajkumari Nimrit Sodhi / Natasha Oberoi		
2014	Rangrasiya	Laila		
2014	Gustakh Dil	Nikhil's maternal Aunt		
2015	Chakravartin Ashoka Samrat	Noor Khorasan		
2015	Kuch Toh Hai Tere Mere Darmiyaan	Vidya Venket		
2016	Darr Sabko Lagta Hai		Episode 32	
2016–2017	Devanshi	Sarla		
2018–2019	Beechwale – Bapu Dekh Raha Hain	Sheetal		
2019	Laal Ishq	Nandita	Episode 112	
2019	Laal Ishq	Widow	Episode 139	
2020	Yehh Jadu Hai Jinn Ka!	Mrs. Choudhary		
2023–2024	Baatein Kuch Ankahee Si	Vedika Malhotra		
2025	Jhanak	Mrinalini "Meenu" Ghosh Bose		
