= Shree (TV series) =

Indian Hindi-language supernatural romantic TV series

- Genre: Supernatural fiction; Romantic thriller
- Created by: Jamnadas Majethia
- Written by: Jayesh Patil; Munisha Rajpal
- Directed by: Glen Barretto; Ankush Mohla
- Starring: Wasna Ahmed and Pankaj Tiwari
- Opening theme: "Shree"
- Country of origin: India
- Original language: Hindi
- No. of episodes: 187

Production
- Producers: Jamnadas Majethia; Aatish Kapadia
- Running time: 23 minutes
- Production company: Hats Off Productions

Original release
- Network: Zee TV
- Release: 22 December 2008 – 12 November 2009

Shree is a Hindi-language supernatural soap opera that premiered on 22 December 2008 Zee TV. Produced by Jamnadas Majethia of Hats Off Productions, the series stars Wasna Ahmed as Shree and Pankaj Tiwari as Hari in the main leads.

== Cast ==
- Wasna Ahmed as Shree Raghuvanshi: Hari's wife; Rudra and Naveli's mother (2008-2009)
- Pankaj Tiwari as Hari Raghuvanshi: Shree's husband; Rudra and Naveli's father (2008-2009)
- Veebha Anand as Kangana: Hari's former lover. She was killed by Anant on her marriage day. Her ghost inhabited the Raghuvanshi house. She wanted to kill Shree so she can marry Hari. She wanted to ruin the Raghuvanshi family but she repented and left the house. (2008-2009)
- Jiten Lalwani as Anant Raghuvanshi
- Shalmili Toyle as Madhu Raghuvanshi
- Sparsh Khanchandani as Naveli Raghuvanshi: Shree and Hari's daughter and Rudra's sister
- Trishna Vivek as Nikki Raghuvanshi
- Mehul Buch as Narottam
- Aruna Irani as Shree's mother
- Madhurima Tuli as Bindiya
- Nimisha Vakharia as Putlibai
- Anang Desai as Saptarishi Maharaj
- Meet Mandavia as Chotu
- Quophi Asare as GoddySly

== Plot ==
Haunted by Kangana, the ghost of his first contender, Hari meets a sweet young woman called Shree in strange circumstances. However, after getting to know each other better, the two fell in love and end up getting married without worrying about the consequences.

Trapped by a wizard then released accidentally by Shree, Kangana returns to take revenge on the Shree-Hari couple and tries to win back the love of her life. And, later, she does not hesitate to trap Hari to make an agreement with Shree which would allow him to have control over one of the false twins to be born of her rival.

=== 6 years later ===
Kangana, having released Hari, therefore passed agreement. Shree who was pregnant, gave birth to fraternal twins whose boy, Rudra, only lives to support Kangana's cause. At the age of 6, he nourished, under the influence of this ghost, the desire to kill his mother and make Kangana his own by wanting to give her to his father as a wife. But, in the case of his twin sister, Naveli, that is out of the question. Thus, the story expands, and the children of Shree, endowed with magical powers, become involved.
