= Shantanu Gupta =

Indian author and political analyst

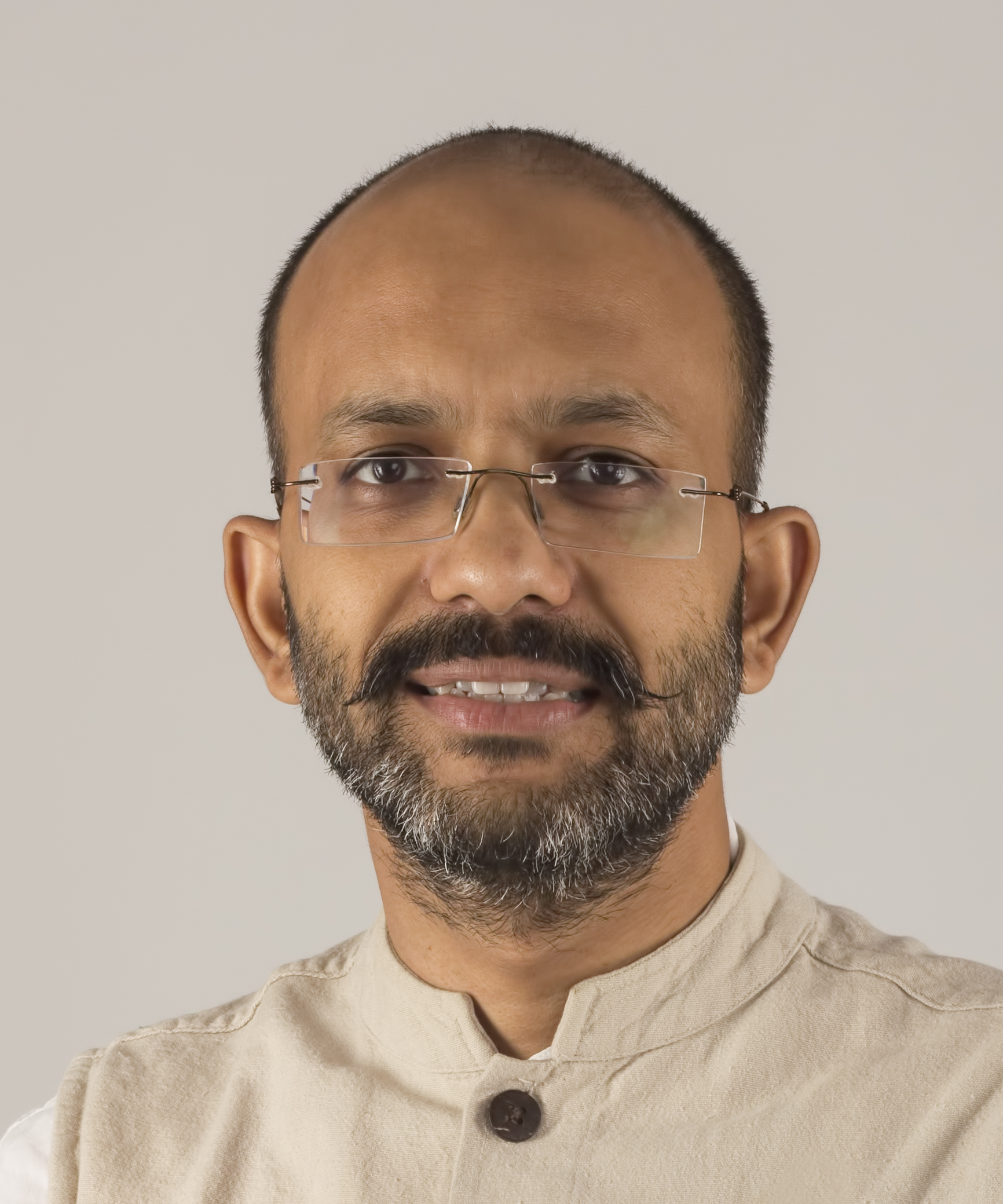
- Shantanu Gupta in 2017
- Born: 7 February 1979 (age 47); Bareilly, Uttar Pradesh, India
- Education: XLRI - Xavier School of Management Jamshedpur, University of Sussex
- Occupations: Author, political analyst
- Spouse: Swetha Rao Duggu
- Children: Abhiram, Nakshatra
- Writing career
- Language: English, Hindi
- Genre: Non-Fiction
- Notable works: The Monk Who Became Chief Minister, Bharatiya Janata Party - Past, Present & Future, India's Football Dreams, Uttar Pradesh - Vikas Ki Prateeksha Mein
- Website: www.shantanugupta.in

Shantanu Gupta is an Indian author and political analyst. He is also the founder of The Ramayana School. Gupta has authored ten books including Bharatiya Janata Party: Past, Present and Future – story of the World's Largest Political Party and The Monk Who Became Chief Minister which is biography of the 22nd and current Chief Minister of Uttar Pradesh - Yogi Adityanath. Gupta has written the sequel of Yogi Adityanath's biography The Monk Who Transformed Uttar Pradesh and graphic novel on the same, Ajay to Yogi Adityanath. Gupta is the first author to introduce a political comic in India for the first time voters for the 2024 general elections, titled, 101 Reasons Why I Will Vote for Modi.

== Early life and education ==
Shantanu Gupta was born on 7 February 1979 in Bareilly, a town in Uttar Pradesh and raised in Rishikesh, Uttarakhand, where his father worked in the public sector company Indian Drugs and Pharmaceuticals Limited (IDPL). He did his schooling from Kendriya Vidyalaya and subsequently studied engineering degree at G. B. Pant University of Agriculture and Technology. He thereafter studied management at XLRI, Jamshedpur and worked as a consultant for many years in India and abroad. In 2008 he went to the Institute of Development Studies (IDS), University of Sussex, United Kingdom, to do his master's degree in Governance and Development. Shantanu is also a Gurkul Chevening fellow from the University of Oxford, UK.

== Career ==
Gupta started his career with a CAD/CAM software company in Hyderabad named Intergraph and over the years worked for different organizations like Quark, Geometric Software, Mercedes-Benz, Amdocs and Wipro. Later he left corporate life and started his social sector career with Naandi Foundation. Under Naandi, he helped manage projects related to remedial education interventions in Andhra Pradesh, Maharashtra & New Delhi. He also worked with UNICEF for its Integrated District Approach (IDA) project in Bundelkhand, Uttar Pradesh. Subsequently, he became the part of Centre for Civil Society (CCS), a think tank. Gupta has been a proponent of private schools with a lower fee option, vis a vis government run free and subsidized schools.

He is also the communication advisor to Baba Ramdev and alumni of XLRI Jamshedpur and Institute of Development Studies (IDS), University of Sussex, (United Kingdom) in India.

Gupta had left his corporate career and became an author and he writes on political & policy issues.

=== The Ramayana School ===
Gupta has founded The Ramayana School, which describes itself as "an endeavor to explore and contextualize the life lessons present in Ramayana to the present times.

== Works ==
Gupta launched his book Ajay to Yogi Adityanath in the Indian Embassy in London and in the British Parliament. For the same book Gupta create a Asia Book of Records, by launching it in 51 Schools of Uttar Pradesh together.

Gupta has authored the India's Football Dream, Education Policy in India: Voice Choice and Incentives (2015), Man Ki Baat and Uttar Pradesh - Vikas Ki Prateeksha Mein.

Gupta wrote The Monk Who Became Chief Minister, biography of 22nd Chief Minister of Uttar Pradesh-Yogi Adityanath. Book was published in 2017 by Bloomsbury Publishing. He wrote another book The Monk Who Transformed Uttar Pradesh which was published in 2021 by Garuda Prakashan.

His recent work in 2024 is 101 Reasons, Why I Will Vote For Modi,

== See also ==
- List of Indian writers
