= Hindu Yuva Vahini =

Defunct Hindutva youth militia in India

- Founder: Yogi Adityanath
- Founded: April 2002; 24 years ago
- Dissolved: 3 August 2022; 4 years ago
- Headquarters: Gorakhpur, India
- Ideology: Hindutva
- Political position: Right-wing
- Website: hinduyuvavahini.in

The Hindu Yuva Vahini (HYV) was a Hindutva youth militia. Formed in April 2002 by Yogi Adityanath, it was headquartered in Gorakhpur. Cow vigilante violence, violence related to the Love jihad conspiracy theory, and performing Hindu religious conversions were the top priorities of the Hindu Yuva Vahini. The organisation was disbanded on 3 August 2022.

== Charges and accusations ==
The organisation was involved in communal violence. The Hindu Yuva Vahini was charged by the police in the Mau riots of October 2005, where they organized the Hindu forces in opposition to a politician Mukhtar Ansari, the alleged murderer of Bharatiya Janata Party (BJP) state legislature member Krishnanand Rai (later acquitted of the murder in 2019). Charges of inciting riots, murder, and arson were brought against Hindu Yuva Vahini leaders, along with Ansari and some others in the opposite camp. Eventually, a curfew was imposed on Mau for nearly a month.

In January 2007, they were accused of burning mosques, homes, buses and trains in Gorakhpur when claims of the Gorakhpur temple being attacked emerged. This led to the arrest of Yogi Adityanath and 130 other members. After these arrests, the members were suspected of setting ablaze two coaches of the Mumbai bound Mumbai-Gorakhpur Godan Express.

The organization was charged with burning an entire Muslim family to death in Vatoli, Adilabad, Telangana (then Andhra Pradesh) in 2008. However, Adilabad District Sessions Court judge Aruna Sarika quashed the case against all the nine accused arrested in this connection, all members of this organization, due to lack of proper technical and scientific evidence produced by the Indian investigation agency CB CID.
