= Shoaib Ibrahim =

Indian television actor (born 1987)

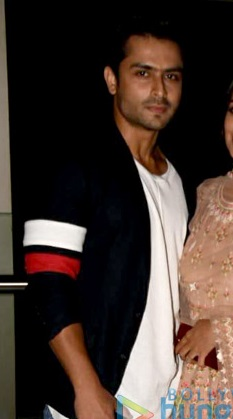
- Ibrahim at the release of Dipika Kakar’s film in 2018
- Born: 20 June 1987 (age 39); Bhopal, Madhya Pradesh, India
- Occupation: Actor
- Years active: 2009–present
- Known for: Sasural Simar Ka
- Spouse: Dipika Kakar (m. 2018)
- Children: 1

Shoaib Ibrahim (born 20 June 1987) is an Indian television actor. He is best known for playing Prem Bharadwaj in Colors TV's Sasural Simar Ka. He also participated in reality shows like Nach Baliye 8 and Jhalak Dikkhla Jaa 11.

== Career ==
Ibrahim began his television career as Karan Pratapsingh in Imagine TV's Rehna Hai Teri Palkon Ki Chhaon Mein in 2009.

In 2011, Ibrahim was seen in a lead role as Prem Bharadwaj in Sasural Simar Ka on Colors TV. In 2013, he left and then got replaced by Dheeraj Dhoopar.

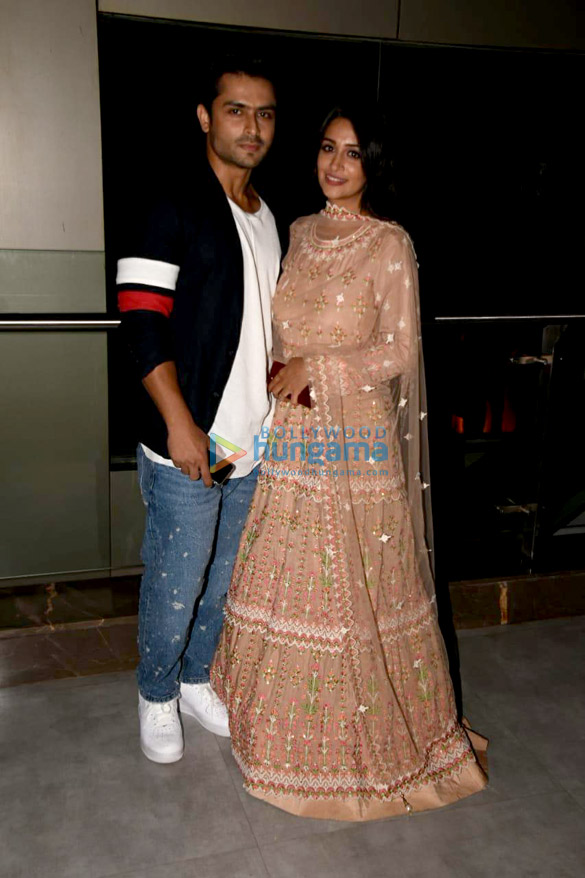
Shoaib Ibrahim with his wife Dipika Kakar

Following a three years long break, in 2017, Ibrahim resumed his TV journey and played dual roles of Abhimanyu and Aditya Singh Rathore on Sphere Origins's production Koi Laut Ke Aaya Hai via Star Plus opposite Surbhi Jyoti. In the same year, he participated in the dance reality show Nach Baliye 8 on Star Plus along with his wife Dipika Kakar.

In March 2018, he participated in Box Cricket League 3. He was next seen in Zee TV's Jeet Gayi Toh Piya Morey where he played the role of Varun Babbar opposite Yesha Rughani. From 2018 to 2019, Ibrahim starred in Ishq Mein Marjawan on Colors TV as Abhimanyu.

In January 2019, he made his debut into Bollywood industry with the movie Battalion 609 as Kamraj Mishra.

After a gap of 3 years, he made a comeback in July 2022 with Star Bharat's Ajooni as Rajveer Singh Bagga.

== Personal life ==
Ibrahim married Dipika Kakar, his co-star from Sasural Simar Ka, on 22 February 2018 in modaha. Before marriage, Dipika converted from hindu religion to islam religion and changed her name to Faiza ibrahim. Shoaib Ibrahim and Dipika Kakar Ibrahim had a baby boy named Ruhaan on 21 June 2023.

== Filmography ==
=== Films ===
| Year | Film | Role | Notes | Ref. |
|---|---|---|---|---|
| 2019 | Battalion 609 | Kamraj Mishra | | |

=== Television ===
| Year | Serial | Role | Notes |
|---|---|---|---|
| 2009–2010 | Rehna Hai Teri Palkon Ki Chhaon Mein | Karan Pratapsingh | |
| 2011–2013 | Sasural Simar Ka | Prem Bharadwaj | |
| 2017 | Koi Laut Ke Aaya Hai | Captain Abhimanyu Singh Rathore | |
| 2017 | Koi Laut Ke Aaya Hai | Aditya Singh Rathore | |
| 2017 | Nach Baliye 8 | Contestant | 4th place |
| 2018 | Jeet Gayi Toh Piya Morey | Varun Babbar | |
| 2018–2019 | Ishq Mein Marjawan | Abhimanyu Agarwal | |
| 2022–2023 | Ajooni | Rajveer Singh Bagga | |
| 2023–2024 | Jhalak Dikkhla Jaa 11 | Contestant | Runner-up |

==== Special appearances ====
| Year | Title | Role |
|---|---|---|
| 2018 | Kumkum Bhagya | Himself |
| 2018 | Ishq Subhan Allah | Himself |
| 2018 | Bigg Boss 12 | Himself |
| 2022 | Kumkum Bhagya: Pyaar Wali Holi | Himself |

=== Music videos ===
| Year | Title | Singer(s) | Ref. |
|---|---|---|---|
| 2021 | Yaar Dua | Mamta Sharma | |
| 2022 | Jiye Toh Jiye Kaise 2.0 | Stebin Ben | |
| 2022 | Toota Tara | Nikhita Gandhi, Saaj Bhatt | |
| 2022 | Rab Ne Milayi Dhadkan | Devrath Sharma | |
| 2022 | Barsaat Ka Mausam | Saaj Bhatt | |
| 2022 | Tujhe Dekhen Meri Aankhen | Mamta Sharma, Sameer Khan | |
| 2022 | Muskurana Tera | Saaj Bhatt | |
| 2023 | Tujhi Pe Mera Haq | Saaj Bhatt, Srishti Bhandari | |
| 2023 | Pyaar Eda Da | Jyoti Nooran | |
| 2023 | Tere Ishq Ne | Saaj Bhatt | |
