= Tanvi Thakkar =

Indian television actress

- Occupation: Actress
- Years active: 2008–present
- Spouse: Aditya Kapadia (m. 2021; sep. 2026)
- Children: 1

Tanvi Thakkar (born 1985) is an Indian television actress. Her television shows include Yeh Ishq Haaye as Priyanka, Miley Jab Hum Tum as Ishika, Sarvggun Sampanna as Deepti, and Pyaar Kii Ye Ek Kahaani as Maya.

== Personal life ==
Tanvi Thakkar is a Gujarati. Her family lives in Chennai. She did her schooling in Ooty, after which she went to Chennai for graduation. She moved to Mumbai to pursue a career in acting. She got engaged to her co-star, Aditya Kapadia, from Ek Doosre Se Karte Hain Pyaar Hum, on 24 December 2013. They married on 16 February 2021 in a court wedding. The couple welcomed a baby boy on June 19, 2023. They separated in 2026.

== Career ==
Thakkar made her debut with the role of Ishika in Miley Jab Hum Tum on Star One. She got popularity by playing Sharmila in Bahu Hamari Rajni Kant on Life OK and Bindya, an arrogant, self-centered TV heroine, in TV, Biwi aur Main.

== Television ==
Year	Title	Role	Notes	Ref.
2008-2009	Miley Jab Hum Tum	Ishika		
2008-2009	Tujh Sang Preet Lagai Sajna	Varinda		
2009	Palampur Express	Lavanya		
2010-2011	Yeh Ishq Haaye	Priyanka		
2010-2011	Ek Doosre Se Karte Hain Pyaar Hum	Foram Majumdar		
2013	Savitri - EK Prem Kahani	Poorva		
2013-2014	Pavitra Rishta	Rashmi		
2013-2014	Desh Ki Beti Nandini	Divya Siddharth Pandey		
2014	Hum Ne Li Hai- Shapath			
2014	Madhubala – Ek Ishq Ek Junoon	Sweety Sharma		
2014	Love by Chance	Suchi Chawla		
2014	Humsafars		Cameo	
2015	Darr Sabko Lagta Hai	Smriti		
2015	Savdhaan India			
2015	Bhanwar			
2015	CID			
2015	Aahat			
2016-2017	Bahu Hamari Rajni Kant	Sharmila Dhyaan Kant		
2017	TV, Biwi aur Main	Bindiya Bhansali		
2018	Crime Patrol			
2018-2019	Meri Hanikarak Biwi	Kunika		
2019–2020	Bepanah Pyaar	Tina Malhotra		
2022–2023	Ghum Hai Kisikey Pyaar Meiin	Shivani Chavan		
2025	Deewaniyat	Babita Chaudhary		
