= Chhal – Sheh Aur Maat =

2012 Indian television series

- Genre: Drama; Thriller; Suspense; Mystery
- Created by: Bhairavi Raichura; Nandita Mehra
- Written by: Mrinal Jha; Johana Mahrat
- Starring: See below
- Country of origin: India
- Original language: Hindi
- No. of seasons: 1
- No. of episodes: 141

Production
- Producers: Bhairavi Raichura; Nandita Mehra
- Camera setup: Multi-camera
- Running time: 20 minutes
- Production company: 24 Frames Media

Original release
- Network: Colors TV
- Release: 19 March – 5 October 2012

Chhal — Sheh Aur Maat (transl. Deceit — Checkmate) is an Indian television series that premiered on 19 March 2012 on Colors TV.

== Plot ==
Two lovebirds Rishi and Neha go on their honeymoon. Rishi is kidnapped and Kabir claims that he is her husband. Kabir threatens her by saying that he will kill Rishi if she will not follow his instructions. Kabir asks Neha to pretend as Aditi, his late wife, in front of his family. Kabir explains that she is a look alike of Aditi, so he can pose her as Aditi. Aditi had died in a car accident.

Aditi is the owner of 10,000,000,000 (one thousand crores) of which 1,000,000,000 (one hundred crore) is given to charity. Kabir can have rest of 9,000,000,000 (nine hundred crores) if Neha a.k.a. Aditi gives it to him. Kabir takes her to his family. While everyone believes that Aditi has survived the accident, Kabir's youngest brother Ranveer and Kabir's uncle have a doubt. Kabir's nephew Gattu is kidnapped by CID officer Dushyant upon the orders of a mysterious character, "Sarkar", who keeps contact with him only through a phone. Dushyant is actually a contract killer who tried to kill Neha twice. He also injures Kabir in one such try. Neha rescues Gattu. Before she manages to find out the truth from Dushyant on Sarkar's real identity, he is killed by an unknown shooter upon the hasty orders of Sarkar.

Ija, Kabir's mother, organises a second wedding for Neha and Kabir on the saying of their family astrologer, while Ranveer locates Rishi and asks him to blow the cover of Neha. Rishi does not carry the job on the wedding day. Neha and Kabir are married successfully. It is revealed that Neha is actually Aditi, who had survived from the accident and had come to seek revenge from Kabir, with the help of Rishi. Aditi later reveals her whole plan to Rishi. They had posed as an ordinary couple which made Kabir believe the facade and do what Aditi had expected. Their plan however faces a glitch when Kabir and Karan kidnap Rishi. Aditi did not expect it. Her focus goes on to rescuing Rishi rather than moving forward with her plan. After successful attempts in outwitting Karan, Kabir and finally Ranveer, Rishi bids her farewell by promising his help whenever she requires.

Aditi then starts planning how she would destroy Kabir, as she suspects he had married her only for her wealth. She plans to force him into admitting that he is the one who killed Aditi. But she realizes that Kabir needed the money for Aditi's sister, Ananya, because it was her right to get 9,000,000,000 (nine hundred crore) after Aditi's death. She tries to convince Kabir that she is Aditi, but he refuses to believe her. She resolves into completing the seven vows of the Hindu Marriage, failing which she promises to leave Kabir forever. She succeeds in completing all the seven vows. Kabir and Aditi reunite.

Aditi's mission now is to find who the real "Sarkar" is. She overhears Ija talking secretly on the phone to the shooter, ordering to stealthily kill Kabir. This is when she realises that the Sarkar is none other than Ija. Aditi gives Ija an open challenge that she will reveal the so-called Sarkar's real face to every one. To investigate further, she goes to the City Hospital where Kabir was born to get the information of Kabir's mother. A living evidence proves that Vasundhara Jaiswal is not Kabir's real mother. His real mother was Aparna Jaiswal, who had died due to unknown circumstances, years after Kabir was born. This made Kabir's widowed father marry Vasundhara. She had accepted Kabir whole heartedly as her son.

Aditi discovers that Ija wants to kill Kabir because he has solely inherited his father's property, and Ija wanted the property to herself. Ija attempted to kill Aditi too, as she wanted Kabir to inherit Aditi's property, which would eventually be taken over by Ija herself after killing him.

Kabir and Aditi adopt Gitanjali (Ginni), after saving her from her drunkard father, Puru. Ginni is a mysterious girl with premonition skills, who predicted various mishaps and deaths of few people including her mother's death and Ija's first son (excluding Kabir), Abhinav's death too. All the predictions come true. This makes Ija really angry and catalyses the bloody game of betrayal.

Maai, Ija's mother, who is an expert black magician, who also learns of Ginni's premonition skills. She teams up with Ija to kill Kabir. Maai formulates a magic charm which Ija is supposed to make him wear, as the charm is specialised in making Ginni not to predict the person's future who wears it. Ija then plans with Ranveer to kill Kabir in a house birthday party of the couple's "adopted daughter", (to avenge death of her son Abhinav). Ranveer hires Puru to carry the job, ordering him to kill Kabir while he is in his clown costume. Ginni, fearing Kabir's death, she begs Kabir not to wear the costume. Aditi wears the costume and attends the party. Puru fails in doing the job because of his alcohol addiction. Ija, by chance, repeatedly stabs Aditi, thinking that Kabir is dressed as the clown. She is oblivious that Aditi is in the clown's costume. It is revealed that Aditi had accidentally worn the magic charm, which made Ginni unaware of fatal danger that had lurked behind Aditi. When Aditi removes her clown mask, a shellshocked Ija drags Aditi to her room, where she rejoices that she has triumphed one of her hurdles in her goal of killing Kabir.

Now, the story takes a supernatural twist. Aditi dies continuously scolding Ija, not knowing she has died while Ija walks out of the room not listening to a single word of her. Aditi has turned into a ghost. Kabir is shell-shocked on seeing Aditi's dead body. While Aditi's final rites are being performed, the heavens open and pull up Aditi. She pleads tearfully to Mata Rani (Goddess Durga) that she had vowed to reveal Ija's true identity for the well-being of Kabir and Ginni. The Goddess obliges her and Aditi has got another advantage. The advantage is that Ginni can now hear Aditi's soul, but only after the sun sets every day. Aditi decides to tell everything what Ija had planned. With help of Ginni, she will reveal her killer. Unfortunately, Maai senses Aditi's presence, and tries to eliminate her soul. She even tries to get rid of Ginni, by sending her to a mental asylum, branding the child as psychologically ill. Puru is again hired by Ranveer and Ija to whisk Ginni away forever with him. The kidnap is planned by the asylum's head doctor along with the trio. Kabir saves Ginni in the nick of time. Aditi succeeds in defeating Maai. After many attempts to convince Kabir that Ginni can hear Aditi's soul, the mother-daughter duo succeed, as Ginni tells Kabir whole story of Neha And Rishi, which the little girl didn't know at all in the first place.

Ranveer also teams up with Ija to kill Kabir. Hiring Puru (Ginni's real father) to kill Kabir had already failed at the house birthday party of Ginni. Puru had also failed in kidnapping her in the mental asylum. This makes Ranveer hide Puru in a desolated place, where neither the police nor Kabir would find him. But Kabir and Ginni catch Ranveer red-handed. Kabir finds out the real truth of Ija through Aditi's soul. Upon requests to Mata Rani, Kabir can now also hear Aditi. He promises her that Ija also would be caught soon.

Kabir's uncle is transformed, as he finds out that Aditi had signed half of her property in his daughters' names, in case Aditi dies. He tells the truth to Kabir that his intention was to always harm Aditi, but she had taken it to her stride, also giving half of her property to his daughters. He joins Kabir in making his own sister, Ija tell the truth.

Kabir deftly and smartly makes Ija reveal her crimes one by one. Meanwhile, Maai formulates another charm, which Ija has to wear herself, as the charm would make her immune to Aditi's soul. The charm also would gradually destroy Aditi's soul and make Ginni weak. But the charm backfires, as Aditi and Ginni stealthily steal the charm and hands it over to Mata Rani, who backfires the charm on Ija. Now, Ija can hear Aditi. She emotionally and mentally blackmails Ija every day.

Ija is now made to turn against Maai by Aditi's spirit. Maai is incapacitated, as Ija disrupts Maai's performing black magic ritual, which in turn backfires against Maai. Finally, Ija becomes madly frightened and she shouts out the truth that she had only killed Aditi. Kabir video-tapes it and gives it to the police as evidence. The police arrests Ija.

Aditi's sole aim is now fulfilled. Ginni pleads Mata Rani that she wants to see and hug Aditi before she goes to Heaven. The Goddess fulfills her wish not only to Ginni, but also Kabir. Aditi tells Kabir to take care of Ginni and always be happy. Her soul ascends to Heaven.

== Cast ==
- Hunar Hali as Aditi Jaiswal or Neha
- Avinesh Rekhi as Kabir Jaiswal (Aditi's husband)
- Abhishek Malik as Rishi (Aditi's old friend)
- Karan Godhwani as Ranveer Jaiswal
- Dev Keswani as Karan (Kabir's friend)
- Aamir Dalvi as Abhinav Jaiswal
- Aishwarya Narkar as Vasundhara Jaiswal ("Ija", or "Sarkar")
- Muskaan Uppal / Arishfa Khan as Gitanjali (Ginni)
- Maansi Jain as Rani (Abhinav's wife)
- Madhumalti Kapoor as Maai
- Sooraj Thapar as CID officer Dushyant Singh
- Raymon Singh as Lata (Kabir's aunt)
- Rajesh Balwani as Bhanu Pratap (Kabir's uncle)
- Rohini Hattangadi the Family's astrologer
- Neha Khan as Gitanjali
