= Hello Pratibha =

- Genre: Indian soap opera Drama
- Created by: Shakuntalam Telefilms
- Directed by: Siddharth Anand Kumar
- Starring: Binny Sharma; Sachal Tyagi; Snigdha Pandey; Sheeba Chaddha
- Country of origin: India
- Original language: Hindi
- No. of seasons: 1
- No. of episodes: 135

Production
- Producers: Shyamashish Bhattacharya; Neelima Bajpai
- Production locations: Ranchi; Mumbai
- Running time: Approx. 24 minutes
- Production company: Shakuntalam Telefilms

Original release
- Network: Zee TV
- Release: 27 January – 24 July 2015

Hello Pratibha (International Title: Hello Pratiba) is an Indian television drama show, which premiered on 27 January 2015 till 27 July 2015. It aired Monday to Saturday on Zee TV. The series is dubbed in English and airs on Zee World from Friday 22 September 2017 on weekdays.

== Plot ==
A woman who forgets her personal interests, goals, and talents while fulfilling the responsibilities of a wife, mother, and daughter-in-law and how she eventually tries to discover herself after 16 years of marriage is the story of Zee TV's forthcoming show "Hello Pratibha", which was launched here with much fanfare.

Pratibha was filled with hope, ambition, and talent of her own, and is now married for 16 years and has devoted her entire life to her husband, kids, and in-laws, thereby facing an identity crisis.

The drama starts off with everyone thinking of Prathiba has a woman meant for the kitchen and nothing else. Her husband doesn't seem interested in her. Her kids look up to the wife of her husband's brother. Her mother is law is never happy with her. She bears all this with a quiet voice. Later she has the courage to speak up and wins everyone heart.

== Cast ==
- Binny Sharma as Pratibha Mahendra Agarwal
- Sachal Tyagi as Mahendra Agarwal
- Snigdha Pandey as Sunidhi Agarwal
- Garima Jain as Namrata Agarwal
- Shazil khan as Anmol Mahendra Agarwal
- Ridhi Arora as Pihu Agarwal
- Sangeeta Panwar as Kashi Agarwal
- Tarul Swami as Sanjeev Agarwal
- Jinal Jain as Shalu Khaana
- Sheeba Chaddha as Pushpa Chachi
- Srishty Rode as Naina
- Stacy Gloria as Roshni
