= Punar Vivah – Ek Nayi Umeed =

- Also known as: Remarriage - A New Ray Of Hope
- Created by: Sumeet Hukamchand Mittal; Shashi Mittal
- Written by: Shashi Mittal; Anil Nagpal; Seema Mantri; Anil Deshmukh
- Directed by: Arvind Gupta
- Starring: Karan Grover; Rubina Dilaik; Parul Chauhan; Srishty Rode; Eijaz Khan; Shruti Bisht
- Opening theme: Punar Vivah By Kamal Khan
- Country of origin: India
- Original language: Hindi
- No. of episodes: 148

Production
- Producers: Shashi Mittal; Sumeet Hukamchand Mittal
- Cinematography: Sudesh Kotian; Navneet Beohar
- Editor: Jay B Ghadiali
- Camera setup: Multi camera
- Production company: Shashi Sumeet Productions

Original release
- Network: Zee TV
- Release: 20 May – 29 November 2013

Punar Vivah – Ek Nayi Umeed (International Title: Married Again-a new hope) is an Indian Hindi-language soap opera that aired on Zee TV. It replaced Punar Vivaah and premiered on 20 May 2013 airing on weekdays. It went off air on 29 November 2013.

== Plot summary ==
Two individuals, Raj Jakhotia and Divya Malhotra fall in love at a teen age, but some circumstances lead them to separate.

=== 10 years later ===
Divya is now a popular TV actress, who returns to meet Raj. She learns that Raj is married to Sarita (Srishty Rode). Divya thinks that Raj has moved and she decides to marry Gaurav (Ayaz Khan).

She does not know that Raj and Sarita, even after ten years of marriage, have not consummated the relationship. Raj still loves Divya. Sarita challenges Divya: before marrying Gaurav, Divya has to make Raj love Sarita. Divya accepts this and comes to Raj's house to stay, trying her best to bring him close to Sarita. But the efforts fail and Divya goes away because she does not want to be responsible for breaking Sarita's marriage.

Feeling that he has been very unfair to Sarita, Raj decides to be a good friend to her and help her find happiness with a new partner. Raj fixes Sarita's marriage to Vikrant Suryavanshi (Eijaz Khan), who is a rich widower and his little son, Abhimaan, adores Sarita and wants her to become his mother. Meanwhile, Raj suddenly realizes that he loves Sarita and tells her about his feelings. She breaks her engagement and returns to Raj. However, when Raj's younger sister gets into trouble, Sarita is forced to ask for Vikrant's help who agrees on condition that Sarita marry him. Having no choice, she agrees. Raj is bitterly disappointed.

Vikrant and Sarita get married. Divya makes an re-entry. Raj visits Divya and slips an engagement ring onto her finger to prove to Sarita that he has moved on. When Raj discovers the truth behind Sarita's marriage to Vikrant, he asks her to elope with him but she refuses. Sarita falls in love with Vikrant but owing to a misunderstanding Vikrant becomes upset with her assuming she still has feelings for Raj. Raj sees the error of his ways and gets back together with Divya. Vikrant finally realises Sarita loves him but Sarita is accused of plotting the murder of Kajal and is arrested.

Vikrant realises that Sarita is innocent and helps her escape from the police. While they are on the run, they take refuge in Raj and Divya's house. Divya ultimately realises who the real killer is; Sarita is released. Vikrant, Sarita, Raj and Divya all live happily ever after.

== Cast ==
=== Main ===
- Karan V Grover as Raj Jakhotia– Kamla and Sohanlal's son; Bubbly and Sheela's brother; Munni's half-brother; Sarita's former husband; Divya's husband; Neha's father
- Rubina Dilaik/ Parul Chauhan as Divya Malhotra Jakhotia– Raj's second wife; Neha's mother
- Srishty Rode as Sarita Suryavanshi– Raj's former wife; Vikrant's wife; Abhi's mother.
- Eijaz Khan as Vikrant Suryavanshi– Jhanvi's widower; Sarita's husband; Abhi's father

=== Recurring ===
- Shruti Bisht as Neha Jakhotia– Raj and Divya's daughter
- Eklavya Ahir as Abhimaan "Abhi" Suryavanshi– Jhanvi and Vikrant's son
- Sanjai Gandhi as Sohanlal Jakhotia– Jyoti's son; Kamla and Sundari's husband; Raj, Bubbly, Sheela and Munni's father
- Sangeeta Panwar as Kamla Naik– Sohanlal's first wife; Raj, Bubbly and Sheela's mother
- Pallavi Rao as Sundari Walia– Sohanlal's second wife; Munni's mother
- Nazea Sayed as Sheela Jakhotia– Kamla and Sohanlal's daughter; Raj and Bubbly's sister; Munni's half-sister; Rohan's wife
- Khushboo Shroff as Bubbly Jakhotia– Kamla and Sohanlal's daughter; Raj and Sheela's sister; Munni's half-sister
- Richa Mukherjee as Manisha "Munni" Jakhotia– Sundari and Sohanlal's daughter; Raj, Bubbly and Sheela's half-sister
- Abha Parmar as Jyoti Jakhotia– Sohanlal's mother
- Ayaz Khan as Gaurav Bose– Ekta's son; Divya's former fiancé
- Chitrapama Banerjee as Ekta– Gaurav's mother
- Abhishek Malik as Rohan "Guru" Dubey– Vandana's son; Kajal's former husband; Sheela's husband
- Nisha Nagpal as Kajal Singh– Rohan's former wife
- Surbhi Zaveri Vyas as Vandana Sharma– Rohan's mother
