= Abhishek Malik =

Indian television actor (born 1990)

- Born: 23 May 1990 (age 36); New Delhi, India
- Occupations: Actor; model
- Years active: 2012–present
- Known for: Kaisi Yeh Yaariaan; Yeh Hai Mohabbatein; Kahaan Hum Kahaan Tum; MTV Splitsvilla 7

Abhishek Malik (born 23 May 1990) is an Indian actor who primarily works in Hindi television. He made his acting debut in 2012 with Chhal- Sheh Aur Maat portraying Rishi Shekhawat. Malik is best known for portraying Harshad Saxena in Kaisi Yeh Yaariaan, Rohan Srivastav in Yeh Hai Mohabbatein and Rohan Sippy in Kahaan Hum Kahaan Tum.

== Personal life ==
Malik was born on 23 May 1990 in New Delhi. He was previously married to his girlfriend and the marriage ended in a divorce in 2024.

== Career ==
Malik started off by winning the title of Mr. Delhi in 2009, going on to walk the ramp for designers like Manish Malhotra and Rohit Bal. He made his television debut in 2012 with Colors TV's Chhal-Sheh Aur Maat as Rishi Shekhawat. In 2013, he appeared as Rahul in Sony TV's Dil Ki Nazar Se Khoobsurat and Rohan Dubey in Zee TV's Punar Vivah - Ek Nayi Umeed. The following year, Malik participated in MTV India's Splitsvilla 7 and portrayed Harshad Saxena in Kaisi Yeh Yaariaan.

In 2015, he joined &TV's Bhagyalaxmi as Varun Shukla. Two years later, he starred in Ek Vivah Aisa Bhi as Ranveer Mittal. Next, he played Rohan Srivastava in Star Plus's Yeh Hai Mohabbatein. From 2019 to 2020, he has been portraying Rohan Sippy in Star Plus's Kahaan Hum Kahaan Tum opposite Dhwani Shah.

== Filmography ==
=== Television ===
Year	Title	Role	Notes	Ref.
2012	Chhal – Sheh Aur Maat	Rishi Shekhawat		
2013	Dil Ki Nazar Se Khoobsurat	Rahul Shergill	Supporting Role	
2013	Punar Vivah - Ek Nayi Umeed	Rohan Dubey		
2014	MTV Splitsvilla 7	Contestant	1st runner-up	
2014	Pyaar Tune Kya Kiya	Abhishek		
2014–2015	Kaisi Yeh Yaariyan	Harshad Saxena		
2015–2016	Bhagyalaxmi	Varun Shukla		
2017	Ek Vivah Aisa Bhi	Ranveer Mittal	Lead Role	
2018	Kaun Hai?	Parth Talwar	Episode: "The Mysterious Doll of Putulganj"	
2018	Zindagi Ke Crossroads	Rambhan		
2018–2019	Yeh Hai Mohabbatein	Rohan Srivastav	Supporting Role	
2019–2020	Kahaan Hum Kahaan Tum	Rohan Sippy	Supporting Role	
2021	Pinjara Khubsurti Ka	Dr. Neel Upadhyay	Negative Role	
2022	Muskuraane Ki Vajah Tum Ho	Yuvraj Shekhawat	Negative Role	
2022	Saavi Ki Savaari - Ganesh Utsav	Yuvraj	Guest	
2023	Kumkum Bhagya	Akshay Tandon	Negative Role	
2024–2025	Jamai No. 1	Neel Paranjape	Lead Role	

=== Films ===
Year	Title	Role
2021	Sardar Udham	Bhagat Singh's associate

=== Web series ===
Year	Title	Role	Notes
2018	Duck Se Dude	Unknown	
2025	Saas Bahu Aur Swaad	Karan Rastogi	
