= Sangeeta Panwar =

Indian television actor (born 1972)

- Born: 29 June 1972 (age 53)
- Occupations: Film & Tv Actor
- Years active: 2011–present

Sangeeta Panwar (born 29 June 1972), is an Indian television actor, known for her Haryanvi accent. She made her debut with Shashi Sumeet Productions in the television show Kairi — Rishta Khatta Meetha on Colors TV. With the same production house she did Punar Vivah - Ek Nayi Umeed on Zee TV. She gained popularity which took her career onto a different height and got her more shows. In 2014, she played Kashi in the television show Hello Pratibha on Zee TV. During the shoot of the series she was hospitalized. She made her feature film debut in Sultan, She appeared in Badho Bahu on &TV as Kamla Ahlawat, which has made her more popular.

== Television shows ==
Year	Show	Role	Channel
2012	Kairi — Rishta Khatta Meetha	Vimla	Colors TV
2013	Punar Vivah - Ek Nayi Umeed	Kamla Sohanlal Jakhotia	Zee TV
2015	Hello Pratibha	Kashi Agarwal	Zee TV
2016 – 2018	Badho Bahu	Kamla Kailash Singh Ahlawat	&TV
2019	Abhay	Chuttan Bai	Zee5
2019	Udaan	Bua ji	Colors TV
2019	Muskaan	Kamlesh	Star Bharat
2022	Fanaa: Ishq Mein Marjawan	Jugnu	Colors TV
2024–2026	Mangal Lakshmi	Shanti Srivastav	Colors TV

== Awards and nominations ==
Sangeeta Panwar was nominated as Best Actress in Negative Role for her portrayal in Badho Bahu by Indian Television Academy Awards in 2017.
