= Sachal Tyagi =

Indian television actor

- Born: India
- Occupation: Television actor
- Years active: 2007–present

Sachal Tyagi is an Indian television actor. He has been a part of the show Agle Janam Mohe Bitiya Hi Kijo. He has played the role of Mahendra in Hello Pratibha on Zee TV. He is Playing the Role of Shakti Singh in Mann Kee Awaaz Pratigya 2.

== Television ==
- 2007–09 Ghar Ek Sapnaa as Abhi
- 2008–2009 Mata Ki Chowki as Moksh
- 2010 Agle Janam Mohe Bitiya Hi Kijo as Ranvijay
- 2015 Hello Pratibha as Mahendra
- 2021 Mann Kee Awaaz Pratigya 2 as Shakti Singh
- 2023–2024 Aaina as Naresh "Babusaheb" Singh
- 2025–2026 Jhanak as Anant Kumar Nihar "Parashar"
