= Hunar Hali =

Indian television actress (born 1989)

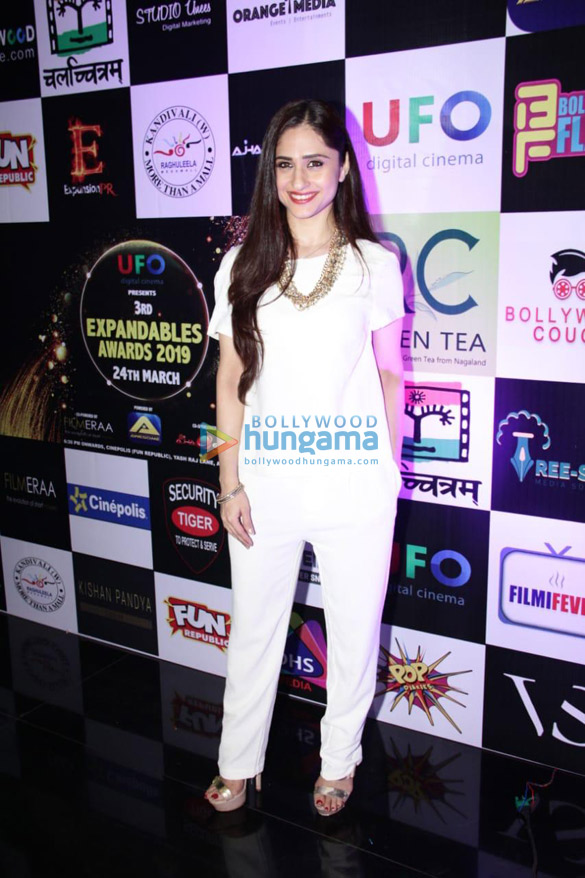
- Hale in 2019
- Occupation: Actress
- Years active: 2007–present
- Known for: 12/24 Karol Bagh; Chhal — Sheh Aur Maat; Thapki Pyaar Ki; Patiala Babes
- Spouse: Mayank Gandhi (m. 2016; div. 2025)

Hunar Hali is an Indian television actress. She is known for playing the lead role of Aditi Jaiswal in Chhal — Sheh Aur Maat, Nandini in Ek Boond Ishq on Life OK, and Lovely in Thapki Pyaar Ki.

== Career ==
Hali made her television debut with Star Plus show Kahaani Ghar Ghar Kii in 2007. After that, she appeared in Grihasti as Soni Khuraana on Star Plus. She was last seen as Lovely in Thapki Pyar Ki on Colors TV.

She has also worked in popular TV serials like Sasural Genda Phool, Mukti Bandhan, Dahleez and Ek Boond Ishq. Hali played the role of lead actress for the first time in the TV show Chhal — Sheh Aur Maat. Apart from television, she is also active in the film industry. In 2013, she appeared as Dimple in Akshay Kumar's film Boss.

== Personal life ==
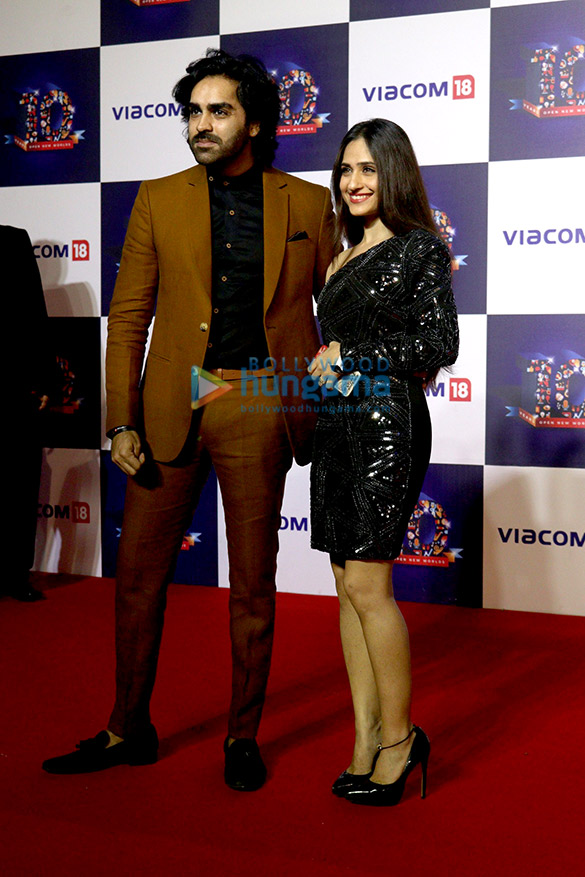
Hali with ex–husband Mayank Gandhi in 2017

Hali married actor Mayank Gandhi on 28 August 2016 in Delhi. Both Hali and Gandhi met each other through their families in an arrange marriage setup. After getting engaged in early 2016, the couple got married in a traditional Sikh wedding ceremony at a Gurdwara. They got divorced in August 2025.

== Filmography ==
=== Films ===
Year	Title	Role	Notes	Ref.
2013	Boss	Dimple		

=== Television ===
Year	Title	Role	Notes	Ref.
2007	Kahaani Ghar Ghar Kii	—N/a		
2008	Chhoona Hai Aasmaan	Rashi Upadhyay / Nisha		
2008–2009	Grihasti	Soni Khurana		
2009–2010	12/24 Karol Bagh	Mili Sethi		
2010	Sasural Genda Phool	Sonali Abhishek Jhavre		
2011	Mukti Bandhan	Nirali Virani		
2011	Adaalat	Varsha Rai	Episodic role	
2012	Chhal — Sheh Aur Maat	Aditi Jaiswal/ Neha Shekhawat		
2013–14	Kehta Hai Dil Jee Le Zara	Ankita		
2014	Ek Boond Ishq	Nandini		
2016	Dahleez	Jaya Sinha		
2017	Akbar Rakht Se Takht Ka Safar	Zainab Sultan Khanoom		
2017	Thapki Pyaar Ki	Mohini "Lovely" Chaturvedi		
2017	TV, Biwi aur Main	Kamini		
2018–2019	Patiala Babes	Meeta Basu Khurana		
2019–2020	Paramavatar Shri Krishna	Rukmini		
2021	Maddam Sir	Genda	Guest appearance	
2022	Tera Mera Saath Rahe	Shraddha		
2024	Deewani	Devika Basu		
2025–present	Rimjhim – Choti Umar Bada Safar	Mohini		

== Awards and nominations ==
Year	Award	Category	Work	Result	Ref.
2025	Indian Telly Awards	Editor's Choice: Best Actress in a Negative Role	Deewani	Won	
