= Dipika Kakar =

Indian television actress (born 1985)

Dipika Kakar Ibrahim
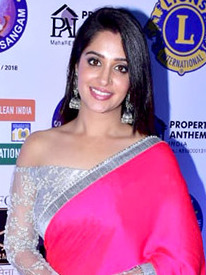
- Kakar Ibrahim at Lions Gold Awards, 2019
- Born: Dipika Kakar; 6 August 1985 (age 41); Pune, Maharashtra, India
- Other names: Dipika Kakar Ibrahim; Faiza Ibrahim
- Occupation: Actress
- Years active: 2010–present
- Known for: Sasural Simar Ka; Nach Baliye 8; Bigg Boss 12; Kahaan Hum Kahaan Tum
- Spouses: Raunak Samson (m. 2011; div. 2015) Shoaib Ibrahim (m. 2018)
- Children: 1

Dipika Kakar Ibrahim, (née Kakar; also known as Faiza Ibrahim; born 6 August 1985) is an Indian actress who works in Hindi television. She is known for playing Simar in Sasural Simar Ka and Sonakshi in Kahaan Hum Kahaan Tum. She participated in the reality show Bigg Boss 12 and emerged as the winner in 2018. She also participated in Nach Baliye 8 finishing at 4th place.

== Early life and education ==
Dipika was born on 6 August 1985 in Pune, India. Kakar completed her school level exams conducted by the Central Board of Secondary Education and then graduated from the University of Mumbai. After completing her studies she started working as a flight attendant with Jet Airways for almost 3 years. Due to some health issues, she resigned and joined the entertainment industry.

== Career ==
Kakar started her career as an Air Hostess for three years in Mumbai. Then, she made her television debut in 2010 with Neer Bhare Tere Naina Devi where she played Lakshmi. She then appeared in Agle Janam Mohe Bitiya Hi Kijo as Rekha.

From 2011 to 2017, she portrayed Simar Bhardwaj in Colors TV's Sasural Simar Ka. In 2015, Kakar participated in the celebrity dance reality show Jhalak Dikhhla Jaa 8. In 2017, she participated in Star Plus's Nach Baliye 8 with Shoaib Ibrahim. She next appeared in Entertainment Ki Raat.

In October 2018, Kakar Ibrahim participated in Bigg Boss 12. On 30 December 2018, she emerged as the winner of the season.

In 2019 and 2020, she portrayed Sonakshi Rastogi in Star Plus's Kahaan Hum Kahaan Tum opposite Karan Grover.

== Personal life ==
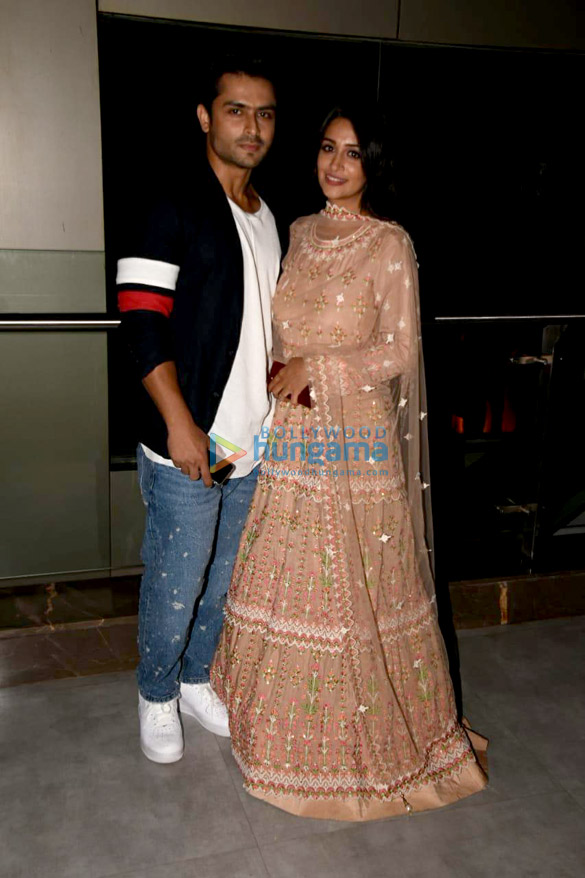
Dipika Kakar Ibrahim with her husband Shoaib Ibrahim

Kakar married Raunak Samson in 2011 but separated in 2015. She married Shoaib Ibrahim, her co-star from Sasural Simar Ka, on 22 February 2018 in Bhopal. She converted to Islam and changed her name to Faiza Ibrahim. Kakar and Ibrahim welcomed their son, Ruhaan, in 2023.

Kakar and Ibrahim were on a family vacation in Kashmir with their son Ruhaan, but they left Kashmir before the terrorist attack in Pahalgam.

Ibrahim broke the news via a vlog that Kakar has a tennis ball sized tumor in her liver. Kakar underwent a procedure in February 2026 for the removal of a stomach cyst and a liver cyst. Her husband confirmed that the surgery was successful.

== Filmography ==
=== Television ===
List of Dipika Kakar television credits
Year	Title	Role	Notes	Ref.
2010	Neer Bhare Tere Naina Devi	Lakshmi/Devi		
2011	Agle Janam Mohe Bitiya Hi Kijo	Rekha Prasad		
2011–2017	Sasural Simar Ka	Simar Bhardwaj		
2015	Jhalak Dikhhla Jaa 8	Contestant	16th place	
2017	Nach Baliye 8	Contestant	4th place	
2017–2018	Entertainment Ki Raat	Contestant		
2018	Box Cricket League 3	Contestant		
2018	Bigg Boss 12	Contestant	Winner	
2019–2020	Kahaan Hum Kahaan Tum	Sonakshi Rastogi		
2025	Celebrity MasterChef	Contestant	8th place	

==== Special appearances ====
List of Dipika Kakar television special appearances credits
Year	Title	Role	Ref.
2011	Rishton Se Badi Pratha	Simar	
2011	Bigg Boss 5	Simar	
2012	Na Bole Tum Na Maine Kuch Kaha	Simar	
2012	Kairi — Rishta Khatta Meetha	Simar	
2013	Madhubala – Ek Ishq Ek Junoon	Simar	
2014	Beintehaa	Simar	
2014	Jhalak Dikhhla Jaa 7	Simar	
2015	Shastri Sisters: Chaar Dil Ek Dhadkan	Simar	
2015	Comedy Nights with Kapil	Herself	
2015	Swaragini - Jodein Rishton Ke Sur	Simar	
2016	Balika Vadhu	Simar	
2017	Koi Laut Ke Aaya Hai	Herself	
2017	Sajan Re Phir Jhooth Mat Bolo	Herself	
2017	Kundali Bhagya	Herself	
2017	Bigg Boss 11	Herself	
2018	Qayamat Ki Raat	Suhasini Thakur	
2018	Kumkum Bhagya	Herself	
2019	Nach Baliye 9	Herself	
2019	Kasautii Zindagii Kay	Sonakshi	
2019	Yeh Rishta Kya Kehlata Hai	Sonakshi	
2019	Yeh Hai Mohabbatein	Sonakshi	
2020	Yeh Hai Chahatein	Sonakshi	
2021	Sasural Simar Ka 2	Simar	
2023	Jhalak Dikhhla Jaa 11	Herself	

=== Films ===
List of Dipika Kakar film credits
Year	Title	Role	Notes	Ref.
2018	Paltan	Capt. Prithvi Singh Dagar's fiancée	Cameo	

=== Music videos ===
List of Dipika Kakar music video credits
Year	Title	Singer(s)	Ref.
2021	Yaar Dua	Mamta Sharma	
2022	Jiye Toh Jiye Kaise 2.0	Stebin Ben	
2022	Toota Tara	Nikhita Gandhi, Saaj Bhatt	
2022	Rab Ne Milayi Dhadkan	Devrath Sharma	
2022	Barsaat Ka Mausam	Saaj Bhatt	
2022	Tujhe Dekhen Meri Aankhen	Mamta Sharma, Sameer Khan	
2022	Muskurana Tera	Saaj Bhatt	

== Awards and nominations ==
List of awards and nominations received by Dipika Kakar
Year	Award	Category	Work	Result	Ref.
2015	Indian Telly Awards	Best Actress in Leading Role (Popular)	Sasural Simar Ka	Nominated	
2015	Gold Awards	Best Jodi (Popular) With (Dheeraj Dhoopar)	Sasural Simar Ka	Nominated	
2015	Gold Awards	Best Actor Female	Sasural Simar Ka	Won	
2015	Gold Awards	Most Fit Actor Female	—N/a	Won	
2019	Gold Awards	Best Actor (Female)	Kahaan Hum Kahaan Tum	Nominated	

== See also ==
- List of Hindi television actresses
- List of Indian television actresses
- List of Indian television actors
