= TV Biwi Aur Main =

Indian sitcom series

- Title card of TV, Biwi aur Main
- Genre: Comedy drama
- Created by: Sumeet Hukamchand Mittal; Shashi Mittal
- Written by: Chintan Shah
- Screenplay by: Rohit Malhotra
- Story by: Rohit Malhotra
- Directed by: Nitin Choudary
- Creative director: Uditanshu Mehta
- Starring: Karan Veer Mehra; Shruti Seth; Tanvi Thakkar
- Composer: Asish Rego
- Country of origin: India
- Original language: Hindi
- No. of seasons: 1
- No. of episodes: 86

Production
- Producers: Shashi Sumeet Mittal; Sumeet Hukamchand Mittal; Rajeev Porwal; Jitender Singla
- Production location: Mumbai
- Cinematography: Dinesh Singh
- Editors: Kshitija Khandagale; Shatrughan Singh
- Camera setup: Multi-camera
- Running time: 25 minutes
- Production company: Shashi Sumeet Productions

Original release
- Network: SAB TV
- Release: 13 June – 10 October 2017

TV, Biwi aur Main (transl. TV, wife and I) is an Indian sitcom series on SAB TV. It premiered on 13 June 2017 and went off air on the 10 of October 2017.

== Plot ==
Rajeev, a television daily-soap producer, is a workaholic, much to his wife's dismay. Hilarity ensues when he tries to strike a balance between his personal and professional life.

Show covers the comic timings created between Priya (Rajeev's wife) and Rajeev's mom who is not satisfied with her son's choice and wanted a daughter-in-law just like Bindiya (Rajeev's show's heroine). She thinks Bindiya is a perfect daughter-in-law as she portrays in the show and compares Priya with Bindiya, though in reality Bindiya is a self-centered arrogant attention seeker. As the time passes Rajeev's mom is shown to have a soft corner for Priya. The show ended with Rajeev receiving a chance to produce one more show in the same channel and he thanks everyone including his team and family for supporting him in his journey.

== Cast ==
- Karan Veer Mehra as Rajeev Gupta (TV Producer), Priya's husband Gappu's father
- Shruti Seth as Priya Rajeev Gupta (Rajeev's wife), Gappu's mother
- Tanvi Thakkar as Bindiya Bhansali (Rajeev's TV show's heroine)
- Karan Godhwani as Kushal (Rajeev's TV show's hero)
- Sudeepa Singh as Bindu (Rajeev's Ex-girlfriend)
- Khushbu Thakkar as Tanvi (Rajeev's TV show's creative director)
- Ashwin Kaushal as the Director of Rajeev's serial
- Madhuri Sanjeev as Amma Ji
- Ashok Lokhande as Bau Ji
- Siddharth Dubey as Gaurav Gupta(Gappu) Priya and Rajeev's son
- Shivangi Verma as Maya (Rajeev's TV show's vamp)
- Akshay Bhagat as Spot Dada
- Sanjay Wadekar as Make-up dada
- Jay Shanker Pandey as DOP(Cameraman) Genius
- Premchand Singh as Rajeev's serial's writer
- Bhavish as A.D. Babloo
- Parveen Kaur (Kushal's Mother in serial)
- Nitin Bhatia as EP
- Hunar Hali as Kamini
- Rajesh Kumar as Jijaji
- Sushmita Mukherjee as Mausi Dadi Ji
- Spandan Chaturvedi as Munni
- Ketki Dave as Priya's Mother
- Twinkle R Vasisht as Leela, Priya's friend

== Episodes ==
No. in season	Title	Original release date
1	"Rajeev in Trouble"	June 13, 2017
Rajeev is a producer of a popular TV show. Rajeev's assistant tells him that they do not have a mangalsutra to shoot a sequence for their daily soap.
2	"Priya Yells At Bindiya"	June 14, 2017
Priyanka and her friends are observing a religious fast for the long lives of their husbands. Meanwhile, Rajeev ponders over different ways to borrow the nuptial necklace from Priyanka. Then, Priyanka's friends show her Bindiya's interview in which she praises her chemistry with Rajeev. Suddenly, Rajeev enters the room and demands Priyanka's nuptial necklace which shocks Priyanka as well as her friends.
3	"Bindiya Refuses To Work In Rajeev's Soap Opera"	June 15, 2017
Rajeev's troubles escalate as Priyanka refuses to give him the nuptial necklace while Bindiya threatens to leave the shooting location. Meanwhile, Priyanka learns the truth and offers Rajeev her nuptial necklace. However, Bindiya is still stubborn about leaving the location. Rajeev travels to the location to convince Bindiya and resume shooting.
15	"Rajeev's Affair"	July 3, 2017
Priya finds Rajeev in a compromising position with Bindu. She vents out her anger on Rajeev. In defence, Rajeev claims that she is doubting her loyalty. Priya refuses to forgive Rajeev and walks out of the room. Rajeev decides to visit the set in order to escape Priya's wrath. Will Rajeev manage to win over Priya? Watch this episode to find out.
16	"Priya's Singing Skills"	July 4, 2017
Priya and Rajeev wake up to the sound of bhajan. Rajeev's mother-in-law is impressed by Bindu's devotion to God. She ridicules Priya as she does not know any bhajan. Priya is enraged and decides to sing a bhajan to prove that she can sing. But, Rajeev stops her before things go out of hand.
17	"Bindu's True Motive"	July 5, 2017
Bindu brings a ring for Rajeev and puts the ring in his engagement ring finger. This enrages Priya, who insults Bindu and questions her motive. Bindu breaks down into tears and leaves. Rajeev goes to Bindu's room to console her but finds out that Bindu's true motive to come to his house is to marry him. Rajeev somehow manages to escape her room and tries to convey this to Priya. However, Priya feels guilty for how she had behaved with Bindu and thinks that Rajeev is taunting her for her actions.
19	"Priya's Marriage In Trouble"	July 7, 2017
Priya's friends inform her that she has done a grave mistake by sending Bindu with Rajeev to the set. During the shoot, Kaushal fails to put Sindoor on Bindiya's forehead, leading to retakes. Guest: Sudeepa Singh - Bindu (Rajeev's Ex-girlfriend)
86	"Happy Ending"	October 10, 2017
Priya and Bauji with the help of people on the set decide to change Rajeev's habit. Everyone plans to do their task slowly and let Rajeev believe that shooting will be delayed. But, Priya could not keep the secret and tells Rajeev that it was her plan to teach him a lesson. Meanwhile, Amma Ji and Rajeev's mother-in-law arrive at the set to watch the live telecast of Bindiya's show. Later, Rajeev thanks everyone for making Bindiya Sringar Ek Suhagan Ka successful.
