= Ajooni =

Indian drama television series

- Genre: Drama; Romance
- Created by: Trivendra Singh
- Written by: Vandana Tiwari
- Screenplay by: Lalsa Verma; Sumeet Vishnoi
- Story by: Vishal Watwani; Renu Watwani
- Directed by: Yogesh Bijendra Bhati
- Starring: Ayushi Khurana; Shoaib Ibrahim
- Country of origin: India
- Original language: Hindi
- No. of episodes: 316

Production
- Producers: Hemant Ruparel; Ranjeet Thakur
- Cinematography: Prateek Singh Rajput
- Editors: Dharmesh Patel; Shakti Mahanti
- Running time: 20-24 minutes
- Production company: Frames Production Company Private Limited

Original release
- Network: Star Bharat; Disney+ Hotstar
- Release: 26 July 2022 – 23 August 2023

Ajooni (transl. Infinite) is an Indian Hindi-language drama television series that starred Ayushi Khurana and Shoaib Ibrahim. It aired from 26 July 2022 to 23 August 2023 on Star Bharat.

== Plot ==
It is the story of a woman named Ajooni Vohra who will go to any lengths to fight for her rights. Rajveer Singh Bagga belongs to the Bagga family, known for their power in Punjab. The Baggas, headed by Rajveer's father, Ravindra Singh Bagga, are rooted deep in tradition and superstition. The Vohra family, however, are traditional but believe in progressive thinking and educating their daughters Ajooni and Meher. Rajveer Singh Bagga and Ajooni Vohra eventually fall in love despite seeming incompatible in the beginning.

The story is set in Haryalipur, where Ajooni and Avinash are to be engaged but then Ajooni accidentally meets Rajveer in the market and he falls for Ajooni - love at first sight, He starts stalking her and breaks her engagement with Avinash. After no option left, Ajooni agrees to marry Rajveer. After the marriage there are many dramas. Rajveer's younger sister, Dolly plots against Ajooni as she does not like her. Ajooni supports Amanpreet, her sister-in-law. Harman and Dolly plots together. Avinash returns to Ajooni's life. Ajooni is not initially satisfied with her marriage, but over time she realizes Rajveer's genuine love for her. After time and difficulties for Ajooni she faces more difficulties including the time when Harvendra Singh Bagga does not become a father After a lot of tries, he decides to marry Shikha, a girl who he has secretly meet but in real Shikha just wants all the money, respect and property of the Baggas. After plotting tons of times Ajooni finds her secret and poses as Kamali, a new maid. Slowly she got closer and closer until Shikha and her boyfriend fall into a trap. Their secret is out but the money that the Baggas had for loan was stolen by Ravindra's younger stepbrother Tejendra Singh Bagga and his son Shankar "Shanky" Singh Bagga. But all this was plotted by Tejendra's evil and vicious mother, Amrit Jarnail Singh Bagga. Ravindra, after knowing this called Tejendar to the Bagga house only to humiliate and build anger in Tejendra. But he knows a secret that nobody else knows that is he had switched Rajveer and Shanky at birth but his good and naive wife Kaveri Tejendra Singh Bagga told Tejendra that when she saw him switching Rajveer and Shanky she switched them back after Tejendra went away. After scoldings by both Tejendra and Amrit they thought to themselves that they don't know about this so Tejendra breaks the news and the Baggas are shattered and Rajveer goes to Tejendra's house and Shanky goes to the Bagga house. After having trouble and punishment at the Bagga house Shanky is building his anger while at Tejendra's house they are inside out torturing Ajooni and Rajveer. One night while the lights go out Ajooni is attacked and the goon says that it's an old lady and a couple days earlier Manjyot, Ravindra's mother, came to Tejendra's house for threatening Ajooni. Though it was Amrit who did this but Rajveer suspected Manjyot and broke all ties with the Bagga house and they rift apart. After they had too much hate for each other Ajooni and Harman scheme to get them together but the opposite happens. The night Rajveer and Ravindra were meeting, Ravindra got shot by Shanky. When Rajveer saw him shot he rushed Ravindra to the hospital. But Amrit blamed him and got the cops on him and he nearly escaped. After Rajveer made a run, he went to the Bagga house to meet Ravindra. In the Bagga House Tejendra's family show their true colors and get the property papers and they shoot Rajveer and throw him in the river. When Ajooni hears this she swore to kill Shanky but Rajveer was alive because his younger sister Dolly switched the real bullets with the fake. When Ajooni goes up to try and kill Shanky so Rajveer aka Pathan can save him and gain their trust. After torturing the Baggas too much they finally found out about Rajveer and put him and tie him on a chair that spins so they can shoot arrows at him. Then when the last arrow goes straight to his head Ravindra stands up and beats up the goons and punishes each and everyone that tortured him and his family. Then Shanky finds a gun and attempts to shoot Ravindra but Rajveer pulls him out just in time and the bullet hits Tejendra. The Baggas celebrate that the truth has won and have a party and pray to God for prosperity at all times.

Then Rajveer and Ajooni go to honeymoon. Shanky, escaped from jail decides that he will kill each man of the Bagga house. Shikha, who completed her imprisonment, saves them from Shanky and when Shanky tries to shoot Rajveer, his mother Kaveri kills him and surrenders herself to police. Shikha was injured and admitted to hospital by Ajooni and Rajveer. Shikha said that her parents thrown out from their house. Rajveer gives her a room in a working women's hostel. Shikha plans to take over the property of Baggas. Ravinder gives the throne of Baggas to Rajveer and responsibility of Bagga Factories to Harvendra.

She meets Harvendra for her plan to take over the property and the throne. Arvinder joins her due to the greed of Throne. Shikha approaches to Gyaneshwar Singh, a poor Hindi professor and lookalike of Ravindra to convince him for acting as Ravindra for taking away the property of Baggas because he was a man of principles, they bribed him and kidnapped Chikoo (adopted daughter of Gyaneshwar) with the help of Garewal, a goon. Then, Garewal kidnapped Ravindra and forcibly signed his all property to Shikha. Fortunately, Ajooni and Rajveer save Ravindra and Chikoo. Ravindra, in front of Harvendra acts as Gyaneshwar in Bagga House. Shikha goes to Bagga house for taking her property. Then Ravindra, Rajveer and Ajooni revealed about Ravindra's lookalike, Gyaneshwar. Ravindra guarantees him that from school till Chikoo's marriage, he will carry the expenses. Gyaneshwar thanks him and says that if Ravindra will be in problem, he will pray to God that the problem will come on Gyaneshwar.

== Cast ==
=== Main ===
- Ayushi Khurana as Ajooni Bagga (nee Vohra): Neeru and Subhash's daughter; Meher and Bharat's sister; Avinash's ex fiance; Rajveer's wife (2022–2023)
- Shoaib Ibrahim as Rajveer Singh Bagga: Ravindra and Harman's son; Harvendra and Dolly's brother; Ajooni's husband (2022–2023)

=== Recurring ===
- Drisha Kalyani as Meher Vohra: Ajooni and Bharat's younger sister (2022–2023)
- Pankaj Dheer as
  - Ravindra Singh Bagga: Rajveer, Harvendra and Dolly's father; Harman's husband; Manjyot and Jarnail's son; Tejendra's elder stepbrother; Amrit's stepson; Gyaneshwar's look alike (2022–2023)
  - Gyaneshwar Singh: A professor; Ravindra's look alike (2023)
- Shraddha Singh as Harman Ravindra Singh Bagga: Rajveer, Harvendra and Dolly's mother; Ravindra's wife; (2022–2023)
- Praveen Sirohi as Harvendra Singh Bagga (2022–2023)
- Simran Khanna as Amanpreet Harvendra Singh Bagga (2022–2023)
- Sonia Keswani as Dolly Singh Bagga (2022–2023)
- Veena Kapoor as Manjyot Jarnail Singh Bagga: Jarnail's first wife; Ravindra's mother; Rajveer, Harvendra and Dolly's grandmother; Tejendra's stepmother (2022–2023)
- Jairoop Jeevan as Subhash Vohra (2022–2023)
- Charul Bhavsar as Neeru Subhash Vohra (2022–2023)
- Vedprakash Singh as Bharat Vohra (2022–2023)
- Seema Sharma as Mrs. Vohra: Subhash and Bindu's mother; Ajooni, Meher and Bharat's grandmother (2022–2023)
- Namrata Kapoor as Bindu Vohra (2022)
- Kamal Malik as Kamal: Bindu's husband (2022)
- Simarjeet Singh Nagra as Inspector Manjeet Singh Cheema (2022)
- Pallavi Sapra as Shikha Narula: Harvendra's second wife (2022–2023)
- Gaurav Bajpai as Dr. Avinash Khanna: Ajooni's former fiancé (2022)
- Ashok Pandey as Mr. Khanna: Dr. Avinash's father (2022)
- Ajay Trehan / Manoj Jaiswal as Mr. Narula: Shikha's father (2022–2023) / (2023)
- Tasneem Ali as Karuna Sharma: A social worker (2022–2023)
- Arun Bakshi as Tejendra Singh Bagga: Amrit and Jarnail's son; Kaveri's husband; Shankar's father; Ravindra's younger stepbrother; Manjyot's stepson (2023) (Dead)
- Shweta Gautam as Kaveri Tejendra Singh Bagga: Tejendra's wife; Shankar's mother (2023)
- Robin Sohi as Shankar "Shanky" Singh Bagga: Tejendra and Kaveri's son; Amrit and Jarnail's grandson (2023) (Dead)
- Nimisha Vakharia as Amrit Jarnail Singh Bagga: Jarnail's second wife; Tejendra's mother; Shankar's grandmother; Ravindra's stepmother (2023)
- Abhimanyu Singh Gill as Akshay: An NRI; Meher's love interest (2023)
- Sunil Nagar as Akshay's father (2023)

== Filming ==
On 10 March 2023 around 4:30pm a massive fire broke out on the neighboring set of Ghum Hai Kisikey Pyaar Meiin turning the set into ashes and it was reported that the fire even reached the Ajooni set and another neighboring set of Teri Meri Doriyaann too.

== See also ==
- List of programs broadcast by Star Bharat
