= Aditya Kapadia =

Indian film and television actor (born 1986)

- Born: 14 November 1986 (age 39)
- Occupation: Actor
- Years active: 1994–2017
- Spouse: Tanvi Thakkar (m. 2021; sep. 2026)
- Children: 1

Aditya Kapadia (born 14 November 1986) is an Indian actor. He is known for his acting in television serial Just Mohabbat and also in Hindi and Gujarati films. He was last seen in Code Red on Colors TV.

== Early life ==
Aditya Kapadia was born and brought up in Mumbai.

== Career ==
Aditya made his television debut with Idhar Udhar and Just Mohabbat as a child artist. After that he also played as a child in the Bollywood film Jaanwar. He did serials such as Shaka Laka Boom Boom as Jhumru, Ek Doosre Se Karte Hain Pyaar Hum as Shashwat Nikhilesh Majumdar and Cambala Investigation Agency as Ishaan Mehra. He also played a role in Adaalat as Mukul Shrivastav. He did Bade Achhe Lagte Hain as Khush Siddhant Kapoor/Khush Ram Kapoor, but was replaced by Ankit Narang.

== Personal life ==
Kapadia got engaged to his co-star Tanvi Thakkar from Ek Doosre Se Karte Hain Pyaar Hum on 24 December 2013. The two were married on 16 February 2021, in a court marriage. On 1 January 2023, the couple announced their pregnancy through Instagram. The couple had a son on June 19, 2023. They separated in 2026.

== Filmography ==
=== Television ===
Year	Series	Role	Notes
1996–2000	Just Mohabbat	Gautam	
1998	Idhar Udhar	Abhishek Sharma	
1998	Hip Hip Hurray	Raahil	
2001–2004	Fox Kids	Funtoosh	
2002–2003	Shaka Laka Boom Boom	Jhumroo	
2003-2004	Son Pari	Anokha Abhijeet	
2007–2009	Cambala Investigation Agency	Ishaan Mehra	
2010	Aahat	Mayank	Episodic role
2012	Ek Doosre Se Karte Hain Pyaar Hum	Shashwat Nikhilesh Majumdar	
2013	Adaalat	Mukul Srivastav	
2015	Twist Wala Love	Yash Kashyap	
2015	Suryaputra Karn	Shon	
2015	2015	Bas Ek Chance	Brijesh Patel
2017	Trideviyaan	Prem/Promila	
2017	Aav Taru Kari Nakhu	Himanshu	

=== Films ===
Year	Series	Role	Language	Notes
1999	Jaanwar	Raju	Hindi	
2008	Hari Puttar: A Comedy of Terrors	Rocky A. Dhoonca	Hindi	
2012	Sons of Ram	Luv (voiceover)	Hindi	Animated film
2014	Ekkees Toppon Ki Salaami	Young Purushottam Narayan Joshi	Hindi	Cameo
2015	Bas Ek Chance		Gujarati	
