= Ek Doosre Se Karte Hain Pyaar Hum =

Indian comedy-drama television series

- Genre: Comedy drama
- Written by: Aatish Kapadia; Ved Raj; Abhijit Sinha; S Farhan; Rajesh Soni
- Directed by: Sameer Kulkarni
- Country of origin: India
- Original language: Hindi
- No. of seasons: 1
- No. of episodes: 140

Production
- Producers: Jamnadas Majethia; Aatish Kapadia
- Cinematography: Vijay Soni
- Editors: Ashok Rathod; Ajay Kumar
- Camera setup: 576i
- Running time: 24 minutes
- Production company: Hats Off Productions

Original release
- Network: StarPlus
- Release: 23 April – 16 November 2012

Ek Doosre Se Karte Hain Pyaar Hum (transl. We Love Each Other) is an Indian comedy-drama television series which aired on StarPlus channel between 23 April 2012 and 16 November 2012. The story revolved around the rich Majundar family based in Rajkot.

== Plot ==
Ek Doosre Se Karte Hain Pyaar Hum is the story of the Majumdar family. The show opens with the marriage of the Majumdar family's eldest son Binoy Majumdar and Suseela. During the marriage, the real traits of each character are revealed. It is shown that Binoy and Suseela are having a love marriage. While Binoy belongs to the rich and acclaimed Majumdar family, Susheela belongs to a middle-class Kathiawad family. However, Binoy's parents Nikhilesh and Sanyukta are down-to-earth people who don't value money much and rely more on the goodness of their daughter-in-law. They treat Suseela's parents, Babu Bhai, a Gujarati film producer, and his wife, Premila with the utmost respect. Suseela, the eldest of seven sisters, is extremely childish with a heart of gold. She considers her brother-in-law, Aniket, the Majumdar family's second son as her son from a previous birth. Foram and Shashwat, brother and sister twins, form the youngest of the family. They hate Suseela's childish attitude and constantly berates them. However, Suseela loves them a lot. Finally, there is Dadi, who is the eldest in the Majumdar family, who loves her family a lot.

The show instantly takes a four-year leap on the first day where Suseela is still childish. She cooks highly oily food, talks loudly, and constantly gets scolding by her mother-in-law for her childish behavior. Sanyukta wants Suseela to be like her — strict and mature — but Suseela is nowhere close. Suseela is worried that she might not become a mother, to which Sanyukta constantly consoles her.

Aniket, on the other hand, does nothing all day, just eats and sleeps. Suseela tries to cover him up often. However, he becomes the butt of all jokes of his younger siblings. Slowly it is revealed that Aniket sleepwalks and has some irregular traits. The elders feel there is a link between Aniket's behavior with a horrific past of the Majumdar family but feel it best not to reveal it to Suseela or the others. Suseela tries her best to make Aniket a successful person so that his younger siblings can respect him.

Soon it's the birthday of the twins and Suseela takes in her stride that she and Aniket will take responsibility for the event. The twins are totally against this. Suseela promises Sanyukta that should anything go wrong she will leave the house and go. The twins unwillingly accept this. However, they try to change Aniket's ideas to their own benefits with a highly western theme. On the day of the event, Suseela completely changes the party into a Kathiawad theme and it becomes a grand success. The twins rejoice and start respecting their elder brother.

Slowly it is realized that Aniket was a topper during his school days. So his parents loved him more than the other siblings. The twins started to hate him for this reason. Hence Aniket started losing in his life to get the love of his younger siblings.

Soon Suseela begins to feel its time for Aniket to get married though she doesn't reveal this wish. She knows that Sanyukta has a habit of always keeping her word and will go to any length to protect it. Suseela challenges Sanyukta to a dancing competition and says that the winner gets to ask for a wish which must be fulfilled. The judges are chosen as Suseela's mother Premila, her sister, and her cousin Jignesh (who has a crush on Foram). Foram and Shashwat try to fix the competition; Binoy intervenes and prevents that from happening. During the dance Sanyukta deliberately loses. This is noticed by Mridula who keeps quiet upon being signaled by Sanyukta. Suseela wins the competition and wishes for Aniket's marriage to take place. Sanyukta disagrees with this saying that Aniket is not responsible enough. Suseela reminds her of her promise. Sanyukta says that she deliberately lost, which is confirmed by Premila. Sanyukta says that she lost because she felt for at least once her daughter-in-law will ask for something for herself.

Days pass and Sanyukta finally agrees, saying that Aniket can get married if he proves his capability by earning a fixed amount within a month's time. Aniket succeeds as a salesman and gets acceptance for marriage from Sanyukta. The very next day Suseela lines up her sisters asking Aniket to select a bride from amongst them. The girls feel very awkward; they go ahead with their sister's instruction. Sanyukta rejects the proposal saying that she does not want two daughters-in-law from the same house and saves the situation. Suseela gets a sound thrashing from Sanyukta later.

Enter Tejal, a tomboyish girl from Surat raised by her dad, Gulabchand. She wears boy's clothes, plays cricket, and talks rudely. However, she loves her father. She comes to Rajkot to meet her Aunt Lalitha ben (her father's sister). Aniket by chance goes to Lalitha ben's house to sell clothes when he gets struck by Tejal's cricket ball and becomes unconscious. on the way home, Aniket drops his wallet containing his hard-earned money. Tejal picks it up and goes to his house to return it where she meets Sanyukta. This meeting turns out to be a clash as Sanyukta belittles Tejal for her attitude. Tejal returns the wallet and leaves.

Tejal and Aniket constantly cross each other's path and slowly fall for each other. Lalita ben's daughter loves a guy; Lalitha is against this as he is of a different caste so Aniket and Tejal try to unite them. The guy's family fixes his marriage elsewhere, and the guy agrees since his mother threatens to consume poison. On the day of Nikhilesh and Sanyukta's marriage anniversary, Aniket goes to help Tejal to stop the marriage. Tejal belittles the guy's mom for faking the poison and consumes it herself. The poison was real, and Tejal becomes unconscious. Aniket saves Tejal's life. Seeing this, the elders agree to the marriage of Lalitha ben's daughter with her lover. On the other hand, Sanyukta had planned to introduce Aniket to her friend's daughter; he never turns up and the family learns about his actions for which he is thrashed.

Aniket confesses his love for Tejal and Sanyukta too accepts unwillingly. Slowly the engagement is fixed. Shashwathas never met Tejal. Shashwat, who runs a daily newspaper, publishes that a few shopkeepers of Surat sell adulterated foods. It turns out that one of them is Tejal's dad. Though this is false news, Shashwat publishes it to get fame for his newspaper. Due to this news, the public break down Gulabchand's shop. On hearing this, Tejal beats up Shashwat and breaks his hand. She is unaware that he is Aniket's brother. On the day of engagement, Tejal and Shashwat come face to face and hell breaks loose. Aniket supports his brother. However, Tejal states that she will ask for forgiveness if Shashwat can produce proof of Gulabchand's adulteration. In the ensuing drama, Tejal breaks the engagement and goes away.

Aniket, Binoy, and Nikhilesh investigate the matter and find out that Shashwat is the culprit. They prove this to Sanyukta and ask consent for the marriage. Sanyukta disagrees saying that she will never accept Tejal. Few days pass and Sanyukta still stays on her stand. Finally, Nikhilesh decides to get Aniket married without Sanyukta's consent. Only Binoy and Nikhilesh support Aniket while the rest stay with Sanyukta. Binoy tries various methods to get everyone on their side. By tricking they get Susheela to get the bride's saree. on the day of the haldi, Nikhilesh tricks Sanyukta into applying haldi to Aniket. However, she says that this would be the first time a mother applied haldi to her son without any interest.

Slowly the marriage date approaches and somehow Susheela convinces Sanyukta and she agrees to take part in the marriage but the rest are unaware of this. On the day of the marriage, Shashwat switches Sanyukta's gift for Tejal (Mangal sutra and a necklace ) with empty boxes. He then drives Sanyukta to Monikangana's (His friend and lover) house saying that her father is on his deathbed and he wants his daughter to get married. While Aniket's wedding takes place without Sanyukta's, Sanyukta gets Shashwat and Monikangana marries.

On returning home, Tejal sees Shashwat married and that Monikangana has performed Gruha Pravesh. She feels that Sanyukta has done this to insult her and says that she will not do Gruha Pravesh and will be as a guest till Sanyukta accepts her. Sanyukta gets angry saying that she will never accept her. Shashwat shows Aniket that Sanyukta skipped Aniket's wedding to get him married. Both Tejal and Aniket do not participate in post-marriage events. Tejal tries her best to win Sanyukta.

Slowly it is revealed that Monikangana married Hashwat for his wealth and also brings her dad along. Monikangana always tries to spoil Tejal's attempts to win Sanyukta and creates a rift between them. She destroys food prepared by her, tries to spoil her attempts at organizing a samuh vivah, dirties the kitchen, and employs all sorts of tricks. She even pushes Sanyukta into a river and makes Sanyukta feel that it was Tejal who did it. After this event, Sanyukta loses her speech, which is later regained due to an unforeseen accident from which she is saved by Tejal.

Aniket on the other hand starts succeeding in life with Tejal's help. He joins Babubhai as an assistant and starts winning accolades.

Foram starts falling for a man named Abhishek, who is no good. Tejal tries to protect her but Moni Kangana encourages her.

On the day of a dandiya festival, Tejal saves Foram from crooks and Sanyukta accepts her as her daughter-in-law.

Next Abhishek and foram's marriage is fixed; Tejal shows her true colours and gets the marriage cancelled.

Aniket on the other hand further succeeds and becomes an actor. Monikangana now tries to create a rift between Susheela and Tejal saying that Aniket trusts Susheela more than her. Aniket wins an award for the best actor. On stage he thanks Sanyukta and Susheela. Monikangana uses this opportunity and instigates her against Susheela and Tejal leaves the venue. After her leaving, aniket says that his success is because of his wife and calls her on stage. Tejal had already left by the time.

Back at home Tejal shouts at Susheela and asks her to stay away from Aniket. Aniket hears this and asks her to ask sorry to which she refuses. Tejal slowly realises what happened at the award function after she left and asks forgiveness. In the meanwhile, she also discovers Monikangana's true nature. So she and Susheela team up against Monikangana. They realize that Monikangana is pregnant from another guy before their marriage and try to expose her. Her father on the other hand constantly tries stealing things from the Majumdar bungalow.

In the final episode, Tejal and Suseela expose Moni's true nature to the family. Moni confesses she has done that because she was continuously cheated on by everyone since birth. Her mom left her because she married a wealthy guy. His father who was a gambler bought her up. his boyfriend also cheated on him and made her pregnant. So she turned that way and started hating everyone around her. She finally decides to leave the home to which the family stops her and forgives her.

The serial takes a one-year leap where Moni had delivered a baby boy. Susheela has had a baby girl in the interim. Aniket is now a successful actor and Foram is his assistant. Shashwat starts respecting his elder brother very much. They are all happy that they are together and sing "Ek Doosre Se Karte Hain Pyaar Hum."

== Cast ==
=== Main ===
- Pariva Pranati as Susheela Majumdar
- Vishal Gandhi as Aniket Majumdar
- Pooja Banerjee as Tejal Majumdar

=== Recurring ===
- Jimit Trivedi as Binoychandra "Binoy" Majumdar
- Aditya Kapadia as Shashwat Majumdar
- Pooja Pihal as Monikangana "Moni" Majumdar
- Suchita Trivedi as Sanyukta Majumdar
- Rajeev Mehta as Nikhilesh Majumdar
- Chitra Vyas as Baa
- Tanvi Thakkar as Foram Majumdar
- Mayank Gandhi as Nachiket
- Khushbu Thakkar as Premila Tanna
- Urvashi Dholakia as Ketki Patel, Sanyukta's Younger Sister
- Sharad Vyas as Babubhai Tanna
- Manisha Dave as Lalitaben
- Deepak Dutta as Moni's father
- Karam Rajpal
