= Srishty Rode =

Indian television actress (born 1991)

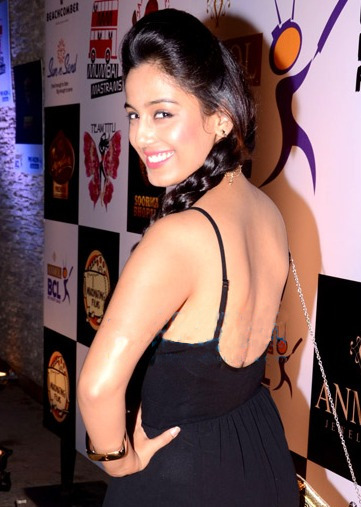
- Srishty Rode at the success party of Box Cricket League
- Born: 24 September 1991 (age 34); Mumbai, Maharashtra, India
- Occupation: Actress
- Years active: 2007—present
- Known for: Bigg Boss 12; The Kapil Sharma Show

Srishty Rode is an Indian television actress known for her work in Hindi television shows. She made her acting debut in 2010 with the television show Yeh Ishq Haaye. She gained popularity with her roles in shows such as Choti Bahu 2, Punar Vivah - Ek Nayi Umeed, and Ishqbaaaz. Rode has also participated in reality shows like Bigg Boss 12.

== Early life ==
Srishty Rode was born on 24 September 1990 in Mumbai, Maharashtra. Her father Tony Rode is a senior cinematographer and her mother Sadhna is a homemaker. Srishty also has an elder sister Shweta Rode in the family. Srishty studied at St. Louis Convent High School in Mumbai. She has completed graduation with a degree in Fine Arts from Mithibai College, Mumbai.

== Career ==
Rode started her acting career in 2007 by landing a role in Balaji Telefilms's Kuchh Is Tara for which she claims she received Rs 1,000. Later on, she started auditioning for television commercials and made a breakthrough with an advertisement for Hindustan Unilever's Fair and Lovely.

In 2010, she appeared in Yeh Ishq Haaye, and the following year she signed up for Zee TV's Chotti Bahu. She continued doing soap operas over the years. In 2018, she portrayed Fiza on Ishqbaaaz and in the same year, she participated in Colors TV's Bigg Boss 12 as a celebrity contestant. She was evicted from the show on Day 70.

In December 2018, just two days after her eviction from Bigg Boss, she confirmed that she has signed her debut film Gabru Gang. The film was released in 2024.

In 2022 she appeared in the 5th season of The Kapil Sharma show as Ghazal.

== Television ==
Year	Show	Role	Notes
2008	Sssshhh Phir Koi Hai	Masoom	Debut
2009	Bairi Piya	Saumya	
2010–2011	Yeh Ishq Haaye	Manjari	
2011	Chhoti Bahu - Sawar Ke Rang Rachi	Radha Rani/Madhvi	
2011–2012	Shobha Somnath Ki	Princess Shobha	
2013	Punar Vivah - Ek Nayi Umeed	Sarita	
2014	Saraswatichandra	Anushka	
2015	Hello Pratibha	Naina	
2015	Chalti Ka Naam Gaadi...Let's Go	Piya	
2018	Ishqbaaaz	Faiza	
2018	Bigg Boss 12	Contestant (Evicted on Day 70)	
2022	The Kapil Sharma Show	Ghazal	
2025	Mona Ki Manohar Kahaniyan	Mona	

=== Special appearance ===
Year	Show	Role	Notes
2007	Kuchh Is Tara	Cameo	
2014	Ishq Kills	Mihita	Episodic role
2014–15	Box Cricket League	Herself	
2016	Box Cricket League 2	Herself	
2019	Kitchen Champion 5	Herself	
2024	Madness Machayenge – India Ko Hasayenge	Herself	Episode 11

=== Films ===
2024 - Gabru Gang - Ginni
