= Kahaan Hum Kahaan Tum =

Indian television series

- Genre: Romantic comedy Drama
- Created by: Sandiip Sikcand
- Screenplay by: Ritu Goel; Rachel Navare; Niranjan Iyengar
- Story by: Virendra Shahane
- Directed by: Sameer Kulkarni
- Creative directors: Sandiip Sikcand; Dolienn Diaz; Dhaval Thakkar; Nimisha Abraham
- Starring: Karan Grover; Dipika Kakar Ibrahim
- Narrated by: Saif Ali Khan
- Theme music composer: Shubham Sundaram
- Opening theme: Kahaan Hum Kahaan Tum
- Composer: Shivangi Bhayana
- Country of origin: India
- Original language: Hindi
- No. of seasons: 1
- No. of episodes: 198

Production
- Producers: Sandiip Sikcand; Veena Sikcand
- Cinematography: Sadanand Pillai
- Editor: Sameer Gandhi
- Camera setup: Multi-camera
- Running time: 22 minutes
- Production company: SOL Productions

Original release
- Network: StarPlus
- Release: 17 June 2019 – 14 March 2020

Kahaan Hum Kahaan Tum (transl.Where Am I, Where Are You) is an Indian romantic comedy drama television series that aired from 17 June 2019 to 14 March 2020 on StarPlus. Produced by Sandiip Sikcand under SOL Productions, it starred Karan V Grover and Dipika Kakar Ibrahim.

Kahaan Hum Kahaan Tum revolves around the lives of Dr. Rohit Sippy and Sonakshi Rastogi, two different individuals belonging to different worlds unaware of the fact that their worlds, though poles apart, are meant to collide.

== Plot ==
Calm and practical, Dr. Rohit Sippy is a heart surgeon, swearing by logic and science. Chirpy and vivacious, Sonakshi Rastogi is a television actress, living in a world of fiction and dreams. The two are broken souls with troubled pasts. Rohit's former girlfriend Raima has been comatose for four years and he blames himself for it. Sonakshi was betrayed by her former boyfriend Karan. Eventually, Rohit and Sonakshi meet but their worlds are poles apart. They bicker and argue, but slowly understand each other's perspective on love and lifestyle and start to see each other in a new light and become friends.

Sonakshi falls in love with Rohit. Unable to move on at first from Raima's memories, Rohit refuses to acknowledge his feelings for Sonakshi but later realises his love for her. Raima finally wakes up from coma. Stubborn and jealous of Rohit and Sonakshi's relationship at first, she later understands their love and leaves. Free from guilt, Rohit marries Sonakshi. He reveals that his father Naren cheated on his mother Veena, by having an extramarital affair with another woman. Pooja who was adopted by Naren's sister Nishi Sippy and her husband Yash Kapoor, treat her like their daughter but in reality, Pooja is Naren's daughter from the extra-marital affair.

Rohit's brother Rohan, whose wife Tanya is pregnant, has an affair with Sonakshi's sister Pari. When this truth comes out, Veena slaps Pari. Pari's mother, Suman, unveils Naren's truth to Veena, shattering her. Naren plans to transfer ownership of his property to Veena and Pooja. Nishi, who is greedy and wants the property at any cost for herself, tries to kill him and blames Sonakshi for the same. But the police officer learns about Sonakshi's innocence through Naren's friend and came to know somebody else in the house had tried to kill Naren. He, with the help of Sonakshi, investigates the case and discovers that Nishi is the culprit. Rohit also uncovered the truth but was blackmailed by Nishi that if he didn't divorce Sonakshi, she will tamper with Naren's health as she has hacked Naren's pacemaker. Helpless, Rohit rudely behaves and ousts Sonakshi from the house, and she meets with an accident. But Rohit saves Sonakshi in time although he does not reveal that it was him who saved her. A broken Sonakshi loses faith in love and tries to move on. On the other side, Rohit starts to destroy himself in thoughts of Sonakshi and his helplessness.

4 months later

Sonakshi and Rohit have separated. She loses her job and is searching for work. Rohit has distanced himself from his family and has become alcoholic. Nishi has taken over the property. Discharged from the hospital, Naren is on a wheelchair. Pari gets pregnant with Rohan's child and plots to get him back to secure her child's future but Sonakshi reprimands her. Tanya miscarries. Rohit gets affected by a virus and in an attempt to save him, Sonakshi finds out the truth that Rohit had been forced to leave her by Nishi who had also caused Naren's accident. She reunites with Rohit and they expose Nishi and her conspiracy, getting her arrested. Veena throws Rohan out for his infidelity. Aakash and Deepa marry, while Rohit and Sonakshi get remarried and everything ends well.

== Cast ==
=== Main ===
- Karan V Grover as Dr. Rohit Sippy: Heart surgeon; Veena and Naren's son; Rohan and Ajit's brother; Pooja's half-brother; Sonakshi's husband (2019–2020)
- Dipika Kakar Ibrahim as Sonakshi Rastogi Sippy: Television star; Suman and Ranjit's daughter; Praniti and Pulkit's sister; Rohit's wife (2019–2020)

=== Recurring ===
- Mohini Kewalramani as Sukhmani Sippy: Matriarch of Sippy family; Piramal's widow; Naren, Nishi and Aakash's mother; Rohit, Rohan, Ajit and Pooja's grandmother
- Ashish Nayyar as Dr. Naren Sippy: Gynaecologist; Veena's husband; Rohit, Rohan, Ajit and Pooja's father; Sukhmani and Piramal's son; Nishi and Aakash's brother
- Shalini Kapoor Sagar as Veena Sippy: Naren's wife; Rohit, Rohan and Ajit's mother; Pooja's stepmother
- Anahita Jahanbaksh as Suman Rastogi: Ranjit's widow; Sonakshi, Praniti and Pulkit's mother
- Tanaaz Irani / Kishwer Merchant as Dr. Nishi Sippy: Cosmetologist; YK's wife; Sukhmani and Piramal's daughter; Naren and Aakash's sister; Pooja's aunt and adoptive mother
- Wasim Mushtaq as Yash "YK" Kapoor: Marketing head; Nishi's husband; Pooja's uncle and adoptive father; Rohit, Rohan and Ajit's uncle; Sulochna's son
- Vicky Thawani as Aakash Sippy: Restaurateur; Deepa's husband; Sukhmani and Piramal's son; Naren and Nishi's brother
- Mrinalini Tyagi as Deepa Wadhwani: Lawyer; Aakash's wife (2019–2020)
- Alice Kaushik as Praniti "Pari" Rastogi: Suman and Ranjit's daughter; Sonakshi and Pulkit's sister; Rohan's ex-girlfriend (2019–2020)
- Abhishek Malik as Rohan Sippy: Builder; Veena and Naren's son; Rohit and Ajit's brother; Pooja's half-brother; Tanya's husband; Praniti's ex-boyfriend (2019–2020)
- Dhwani Shah as Tanya Sippy: Jewellery Designer; Rohan's wife (2019–2020)
- Pravisht Mishra as Dr. Pulkit Rastogi: Suman and Ranjit's son; Sonakshi and Praniti's brother (2019–2020)
- Paras Zutshi as Ajit Sippy: Veena and Naren's son; Rohit and Rohan's brother; Pooja's half-brother (2019–2020)
- Kashish Rai as Pooja Sippy: Naren's daughter; Nishi and Yash's adoptive daughter; Rohit, Rohan and Ajit's half-sister (2019–2020)
- Farnaz Shetty as Raima Sengupta: Tanushree's daughter; Rohit's former girlfriend (2019)
- Simmi Ghoshal as Kanu: Mantri Ji's daughter (2019)
- Romil Chaudhary as Karan Khanna: Sonakshi's former boyfriend; Dolly's boyfriend (2019)
- Hemaakshi Ujjain as Netra Singh Anand: Sonakshi's film producer (2019–2020)
- Deepak Singh Sandhu as Sumit Khanna: Sonakshi's co-actor (2019–2020)
- Vineet Kumar Chaudhary as Mahesh Yadav: Sonakshi's obsessive fan and stalker (2019–2020)
- Shivani Gosain as Rani Verma: Sitara's mother (2019–2020)
- Sangeeta Adhikari as Vimmi: Sippy family's househelp (2019–2020)
- Parmeshwar Shah as Hari: Sippy family's househelp (2019–2020)
- Saba Khan as Muniya: Rastogi family's househelp (2019–2020)
- Subodh Gupta as Ravi: Rohit's driver; Sunita's boyfriend (2019–2020)
- Manisha Soni as Sunita: Sonakshi's hairstylist; Ravi's girlfriend (2019–2020)
- Atul Singh as Shankar: Sonakshi's driver (2019–2020)
- Manisha Chitrode as Dr. Dimpy Rai: Doctor at Sippy Hospital (2019–2020)
- Snehal Borkar as Tulsi Fernandes: Nurse at Sippy Hospital (2019–2020)
- Aasya Wagh as Simmi Bhushan: Nurse at Sippy Hospital (2019–2020)
- Sultan Warsi as Sultan: Sonakshi's director (2019–2020)
- Subhlaxmi Das as Tanushree Sengupta: Raima's mother (2019)
- Sanket Walia as Ashish Mhatre: Politician; President of IPI Party (2019)
- Tanisha Wagh as Sundari Hingorani: Naren's cousin sister (2019)
- Smitha Mohan as Dolly Dsouza: Karan's girlfriend (2019)
- Garima Verma as Tapasya Udyavar: Reporter at City Times (2019)
- Aayesha Vindhara as Preeti Sharma: Rohit's patient; Sonakshi's fan (2019)
- Hema Sharma as Mrs. Sharma: Preeti's mother (2019)
- Naina Gupta as Dr. Chhabra(2019)
- Rahul Singh as Dr. Vishal Bhargava: Rohit's colleague and friend (2019)
- Aman Gandhi as Akhil: Rohit and Sonakshi's wedding planner (2019)
- Mayanka Sharma Patel as Amrita Sethi: Organiser of Miss Dazzling Diva (2019)

=== Guests ===
- Saif Ali Khan (2019)
- Divyanka Tripathi (2019)

== Production ==
=== Development ===
In May 2019, Saif Ali Khan introduced Karan Grover and Dipika Kakar as Dr. Rohit Sippy and Sonakshi Rastogi.

In February 2020, Grover confirmed about the series going off air on 14 March 2020. The shooting of the series wrapped up on 28 February 2020.

=== Casting ===
When I heard the script of Kahaan Hum Kahaan Tum, I knew I wanted to be a part of this show. I have always liked projects which make you excited every morning to go to work.

— Karan Grover

Sonakshi was easy to connect to since I'm a television actress myself and I gave my nod without any second thought.

— Dipika Kakar

In September 2019, Farnaz Shetty joined the cast as Raima Sengupta. In December 2019, Kishwer Merchant replaced Tanaaz Irani as Nishi Sippy.

=== Writing ===
In Kahaan Hum Kahaan Tum, we have dialogues which are spoken everyday and even if you are talking about something philosophical, they are not dramatic because that's not how we speak in real life.

— Niranjan Iyengar

=== Cancellation ===
The series maintained its position in top 11 to 20 shows throughout its runtime with a decent viewership. It continuously maintained a trp ranging 1.6 to 1.8.

Producer Sandiip Sikcand speaking about the end of the series said, "The ratings never went above 1.8. The moment we brought in some drama during Sonakshi's wedding, which was very TV— a psychopath lover and all that, the ratings touched 2.3. And everybody was abusing us. So we said wedding is done, let's come back to our normal KHKT storytelling. Again we came down to 1.7–1.8. And then when the whole drama against Sonakshi was going on we touched a 1.9 again. All this analysis has made one thing very clear, that online everyone say, 'excellent show', but that does not translate into ratings." SOL productions founder and managing director Fazila Allana explained, "Star had maintained from the start that they want to break the 2 GRP barrier for the 9pm slot. It is a tough spot and is against a number one show. We came close but couldn't cross it. The channel probably had their own research and decided that they want to experiment with a different kind of story. Even KHKT was an experiment and it worked up to a point."

== Soundtrack ==
Kahaan Hum Kahaan Tum Original Soundtrack

Soundtrack album by Shivangi Bhayana
- Genres: Romance; Soundtrack
- Language: Hindi

Written and sung by Shivangi Bhayana, Kahaan Hum Kahaan Tum is composed by Shubham Sundaram.

Kahaan Hum Kahaan Tum: Tracklisting
No.	Title	Artist	Length
1.	"Kahaan Hum Kahaan Tum"	Shivangi Bhayana	2:23

== Reception ==
Times Now said, "Kahaan Hum Kahaan Tum is a fresh, never seen before love story between a television actress and a doctor."

Times of India noted, "Dipika and Karan's fresh pairing looks quite interesting. Both of them have perfectly portrayed their inner vulnerabilities."

The Indian Express stated, "Kahaan Hum Kahaan Tum is different from what Indian television has to offer now."

The Quint reviewed, "Kahaan Hum Kahaan Tum steers clear of melodrama, and takes a more realistic approach. And the ensuing drama is also peppered with a good dose of well-written humour and lighthearted moments. Dipika is very natural, looks beautiful and really owns every scene she is in, proving her versatility as an actor. Karan's expressions and comic timing really work for the show. Karan and Dipika's onscreen relationship is progressive, and their chemistry, in comic, emotional and romantic scenes, is easy and refreshing."

Times of India also appreciated Karan Grover and Dipika Kakar's chemistry.

== Awards and nominations ==
Year	Award	Category	Nominee	Result	Reference
2019	Indian Television Academy Awards	Best Singer	Shivangi Bhayana	Won	
2020	Lions Gold Awards	Best Actress (Critics)	Dipika Kakar	Nominated	
