= Bas Ek Chance =

- Theatrical release poster
- Directed by: Kirtan Patel
- Written by: Kirtan Patel, Jay Bhatt, Kushal Naik
- Produced by: Kirtan Patel, Arjun Prajapati, Jignesh patel, Sonesh patel, Hinesh patel
- Starring: Rajeev Mehta; Falguni Dave; Aditya Kapadia; Bhakti Kubavat; Mushtaq Khan; Alpesh Dhakan; Mitra Gadhvi; Hemang Dave
- Cinematography: Amar Kamble
- Edited by: Nirav Panchal
- Music by: Pranav-Nikhil-Shailesh Ahmon band
- Production company: Purple Wings Productions
- Distributed by: Purple Wings Production
- Release date: 25 September 2015
- Running time: 2hr. 32min.
- Country: India
- Language: Gujarati
- Budget: 1.2 cr.

Bas Ek Chance (Gujarati: બસ એક Chance) is a 2015 Gujarati film, directed by Kirtan Patel and produced by Kirtan Patel. The film stars Aditya Kapadia and Bhakti Kubavat in the lead roles. Others includes famous actor Rajeev Mehta, Falguni Dave, Mushtaq Khan, Alpesh Dhakan, Mitra Gadhavi. The movie is about a young artist who is trying to get into the movie industry, and waiting for the right break at the right time which will change his life. The movie is about his journey and how amidst finding the right chance he also finds himself. The film was released on 25 September 2015 in India, Muscat, Australia, the US, and Canada.

== Cast ==
- Rajeev Mehta
- Falguni Dave
- Aditya Kapadia
- Bhakti Kubavat
- Mushtaq Khan
- Alpesh Dhakan
- Mitra Gadhvi
- Hemang Dave
- Jay Bhatt

== Production ==
=== Development ===
The film was produced and directed by Kirtan Patel. Nirav Panchal edited the film.

=== Filming ===
The shooting of the film began on 25 January 2015. It took place in parts of Vadodara, including the famous cross-roads Kala Ghoda, Genda Circle, and Chakli Circle.

=== Casting ===
Bas Ek Chance stars Rajeev Mehta, Falguni Dave, Aditya Kapadia, Bhakti Kubavat, Mushtaq Khan, Alpesh Dhakan, Mitra Gadhvi, and Hemang Dave.

== Soundtrack ==
Bas Ek Chance released a soundtrack ranging from love songs to devotional punk. The songs were performed by renowned and critically acclaimed singers including Roop Kumar Rathod, Javed Ali, Parthiv Gohil, Aishwarya Majmudar and Kshitij Banker. The album also contains traditional chants of Raja Ranchhod in a unique rock version, composed and performed by Ahmon Band from Vadodara.

The music of the album Bas Ek Chance was composed by Pranav Mahant, Nikhil Palkhar and Shailesh Solanki. It was released on 12 September 2015 at Vadodara and received a positive response. The music was released worldwide by Movietone Digital Entertainment Pvt Ltd under the label OnClick Music. The music is available across all digital platforms globally.

Sr. no	Title	Lyrics	Music	Artists
1	Lagi re Lagan	Priya Saraiya	Pranav-Nikhil-Shailesh	Aishwarya Majmudar & Javed Ali
2	Brijlo	Priya Saraiya & Kirtan Patel	Pranav-Nikhil-Shailesh	Roop Kumar Rathod
3	Sapna Joya	Priya Saraiya	Pranav-Nikhil-Shailesh	Parthiv Gohil
4	Bas Ek Chance	Jay Bhatt	Pranav-Nikhil-Shailesh	Kshitij Banker
5	Raja Ranchhod	Abhishek Mishra	Ahmon Band	Bhargav Pandya

== Release ==
In August 2015, the producers released the film logo and motion poster. These were well received on social media. The trailer was released on 27 August 2015. The film was premiered at Muscat, Oman on 18 September and later released on 25 September 2015 in India.

- Transmedia Film Awards: Best Film of the Year - 2015
- Transmedia Film Awards: Best Supporting Role - Rajeev Mehta
- Nominated for:
  - Best producer - Kirtan Patel
  - Best direction - Kirtan Patel
  - Best story writer - Kirtan Patel Jaybhatt
  - Best cinematography - Amar Kamble
  - Best music composer - Pranav Nikhil Shailesh
  - Best actor - Aditya Kapadia
  - Best supporting role - Rajeev Mehta
  - Best female supporting role - Falguni Dave, Bhakti Kubavat
  - Best singer - Bhargav Pandya
  - Best editor - Nirav Panchal
