= Khushbu Thakkar =

Indian actress and former journalist

Khushboo or Khushbu Thakkar is an Indian television actress and former journalist. She has worked on Hongey Judaa Na Hum on Sony TV, and appeared in Rangrasiya as Rudra's sister-cousin Sunehri Ranawat on Colors TV, played role of Shalini Tripathi in Colors's new serial Ishq Ka Rang Safed, she played Ronita in Kuch Rang Pyar Ke Aise Bhi on Sony TV and Tanvi in TV, Biwi aur Main on SAB TV. She appeared in Bhutu on Zee Tv.

She has also appeared in Geet on Star One, Veera and Ek Doosre Se Karte Hain Pyaar Hum on Star Plus, Mrs. Kaushik Ki Paanch Bahuein and Sapne Suhane Ladakpan Ke on Zee TV, Arjun on Star Plus, Comedy Classes on Life OK, Mrs. Tendulkar on Sab TV, and a role on MTV Webbed, among others.

== Personal life ==
Khushbu married her longtime partner in private ceremony on 10 December 2018. They attended the same college and were dating each other for a few years.

== Television ==
Year	Show	Role
2010–2011	Geet Hui Sabse Parayi	Preeto Lucky
2011–2012	Mrs. Kaushik Ki Paanch Bahuein	Honey
2012	Hongey Judaa Na Hum	Maria
2012	Ek Doosre Se Karte Hain Pyaar Hum	Premila Babubhai Tanna
2012–2013	Kya Huaa Tera Vaada	Bitto
2013	Ek Veer Ki Ardaas...Veera	Veera's Friend
2013	Arjun (TV series)	Mala [episodic]
2013–2014	Rangrasiya	Sunehri Ranawat
2014	Sapne Suhane Ladakpan Ke	[episodic]
2014	Comedy Classes	Priyanka [episodic]
2015	Emotional Atyachar (Season 5)	Akshita [episodic]
2015–2016	Ishq Ka Rang Safed	Shalini Tripathi
2017	TV, Biwi aur Main	Tanvi
2018	Bhootu	Barbie
2020	Sanjivani	Anisha Singh
2017–2021	Kuch Rang Pyar Ke Aise Bhi	Ronita
2022	Mose Chhal Kiye Jaaye	Simmi
2023–2024	Suhaagan	Rose
2025	Bade Achhe Lagte Hain 4	Tanu

=== Filmography ===
Year	Movie	Role Played	Language	Ref !
2020	Vaahlam Jaao Ne	House help	Gujrati	
