= Bigg Boss (Hindi TV series) season 12 =

Indian reality show

Bigg Boss
- Season 12
- Presented by: Salman Khan
- No. of days: 105
- No. of housemates: 20
- Winner: Dipika Kakar
- Runner-up: Sreesanth Nair
- No. of episodes: 106

Release
- Original network: Colors TV
- Original release: 16 September – 30 December 2018

Season chronology
- ← Previous; Season 11 Next → Season 13

Bigg Boss 12, also known as Bigg Boss: Vichitra Jodis, is the twelfth season of the Indian reality TV series Bigg Boss which is based on the Dutch series Big Brother, and premiered on 16 September 2018 on Colors. The launch episode was titled "Bigg Night". Salman Khan hosted the season for the ninth time. The grand finale of the show took place on 30 December 2018 when Dipika Kakar emerged as the winner and Sreesanth became the runner up.

== Production ==
=== Background ===
Colors TV invited the general public to send their video clips through a streaming application called Voot on 15 April in order to audition for the show. It was later revealed by the show makers that this season of the show would feature contestants in pairs (any sort of pairs; friends, co-workers, spouses, siblings, etc.), therefore declaring the theme "Vichitra Jodis", which translates to "Strange Pairs".

=== Eye logo ===
The Bigg Boss "eye" is split, with red on one side and blue on the other; red representing fire and blue representing water.

=== House ===
House pictures were officially released on 16 September 2018; the House followed the theme of a "Beach House".

=== Bigg Boss: Outhouse ===
Four housemates entered the Bigg Boss Outhouse a day before the start of the show. The public had power to vote two housemate into the main house. Exclusive videos from the out-house were streaming on Voot from 15 September 2018. Surbhi Rana, Kriti Verma, Roshmi Banik and Mital Joshi were called into the house with a task called "Taala Khol", where one of the pairs were to be eliminated on the very first day of the show.

== Housemates status ==
Sr	Housemate	Day entered	Day exited	Status
1	Dipika	Day 1	Day 105	Winner
2	Sreesanth	Day 1	Day 105	1st runner-up
3	Deepak	Day 1	Day 105	Walked, 2nd runner-up
4	Romil	Day 1	Day 14	Evicted
4	Romil	Day 15	Day 105	3rd runner-up
5	Karanvir	Day 1	Day 105	4th runner-up
6	Surbhi	Day 15	Day 102	Evicted
7	Somi	Day 1	Day 98	Evicted
8	Rohit	Day 36	Day 91	Evicted
9	Jasleen	Day 1	Day 84	Evicted
10	Megha	Day 36	Day 84	Evicted
11	Srishty	Day 1	Day 70	Evicted
12	Shivashish	Day 1	Day 70	Ejected
13	Urvashi	Day 1	Day 42	Evicted by Housemates
14	Saba	Day 1	Day 42	Evicted
15	Anup	Day 1	Day 35	Evicted
16	Sourabh	Day 1	Day 42	Evicted
17	Neha	Day 1	Day 28	Evicted
18	Nirmal	Day 1	Day 21	Evicted
19	Kriti	Day 1	Day 14	Evicted
20	Roshmi	Day 1	Day 14	Evicted

== Housemates ==
=== Outhouse entrants ===
Housemates	Status		
Housemates	Status	Roshmi Banik	Entered the Main House
Kriti Verma	Entered the main house		
Surbhi Rana	Evicted (Day 1)		
Mital Joshi	Evicted (Day 1)		

=== Original entrants ===
The participants in the order of appearance and entrance in the house are:

- Karanvir Bohra – Television and film actor. He is known for his performances in Kasautii Zindagii Kay, Dil Se Di Dua... Saubhagyavati Bhava?, Qubool Hai and Naagin 2. He was a contestant on Nach Baliye and Fear Factor: Khatron Ke Khiladi 5.
- Sourabh Patel – Farmer.
- Shivashish Mishra – Businessman, model and actor. He had a role in SET show Sankat Mochan Mahabali Hanumaan.
- Dipika Kakar – Television and film actress. She is known for her portrayal of Simar Dwivedi Bhardwaj in the long-running soap opera Sasural Simar Ka on Colors TV. She participated in Jhalak Dikhhla Jaa 8 and Nach Baliye, before making her Bollywood debut with the patriotic drama film Paltan (2018).
- Romil Chaudhary – Lawyer from Haryana. He is also a rapper and reality television personality.
- Nirmal Singh – Policeman from Haryana.
- Neha Pendse – Television and film actress. She is known for her role of Sanjana in the Life OK comedy show May I Come In Madam?.
- Anup Jalota – Popular singer who has also sung occasionally for Hindi films.
- Jasleen Matharu – Singer. She made her singing debut with Sukhwinder Singh in the song "Naachunga Saari Raat".
- Srishty Rode – Television actress. She is known for playing Manjari in Yeh Ishq Haaye.
- Somi Khan – Actress, Sales manager.
- Saba Khan – Actress, Front office manager in Hotel.
- Deepak Thakur – Singer.
- Urvashi Vani – Singer.
- Kriti Verma – GST Inspector. She participated in the reality show MTV Roadies 15.
- Roshmi Banik – Businesswomen.
- Sreesanth Nair – Cricketer.

=== Wild card entrants ===
- Surbhi Rana – Dentist. She was a contestant on MTV Roadies 15.
- Megha Dhade – Television and Marathi film actress. She appeared in shows like Kasautii Zindagii Kay, Pehchaan and Kasturi. In 2018, she is the winner of Bigg Boss Marathi 1.
- Rohit Suchanti – Television actor. He is known for acting in Saath Nibhaana Saathiya and Rishta Likhenge Hum Naya.

== Twists ==
=== Sultani Akhada ===
The season brought back the segment. Two housemates have to do physical tasks during the weekend ka vaar's with Salman Khan. There are two rounds. In the first round will be a debate between the two housemates and second will be a light wrestling match. Whoever succeeds these two rounds will be the winner and will get a power. In ended after week eleven.

Weeks	1	2	3	4	5	6	7	8	9	10	11
Weeks	Day 7	Day 14	Day 21	Day 28	Day 35	Day 42	Day 49	Day 56	Day 63	Day 70	Day 77
Participants for Sultani Akhada	Saba-Somi; Dipika; Srishty	Dipika; Jasleen	Deepak; Karanvir	Dipika; Surbhi	Romil; Sreesanth	Jasleen; Shivashish; Sreesanth; Surbhi; Deepak; Romil	Karanvir; Shivashish	Karanvir; Sreesanth	Jasleen; Srishty	Romil; Surbhi	N/A
Winner	Dipika; Srishty	Dipika	Karanvir	Surbhi	Romil	Jasleen; Shivashish	Karanvir		Jasleen	Romil	N/A

== Nominations table ==
		Week 1		Week 2	Week 3	Week 4			Week 5	Week 6	Week 7		Week 8	Week 9	Week 10	Week 11	Week 12	Week 13	Week 14	Week 15		
		Day 1	Day 2	Week 2	Week 3	Day 22	Day 24	Day 25	Week 5	Week 6	Day 43	Day 49	Week 8	Week 9	Week 10	Week 11	Week 12	Week 13	Week 14	Day 102	Day 105	
Nominees for Captaincy		No Captain		Dipika; Kriti & Roshmi	Karanvir; Neha	Romil & Surbhi; Saba & Somi; Sourabh & Shivashish			Saba; Somi; Srishty	Shivashish; Deepak	Deepak; Megha; Somi		Jasleen; Sreesanth	Karanvir; Megha; Romil; Somi	Romil; Shivashish	Deepak; Surbhi	Deepak; Dipika; Romil; Surbhi	Rohit; Surbhi	Dipika; Deepak; Surbhi	No Captain		
House Captain		No Captain		Kriti & Roshmi	Neha	Romil & Surbhi			Surbhi	Shivashish	Deepak		Sreesanth	Karanvir	Romil	Surbhi	No; Captain	Surbhi		No Captain		
Captain's Nominations		No Captain		Deepak; Urvashi (to save)	No; Nominations	No; Nominations	Neha (to evict)	No; Nominations	Shivashish (to save); Sourabh (to evict)	Not eligible	Sreesanth (to evict)	Urvashi (to evict)	Somi; Rohit; Jasleen; Karanvir; Deepak; Surbhi; Romil (to evict)	Not eligible	Not eligible	Dipika; Jasleen; Megha; Romil; Deepak (to evict)	No; Captain	Sreesanth (to save)	38:50 Mins	No Captain		
Jail Nominations		Karanvir; Nirmal; Romil		Dipika; Nirmal; Romil	Karanvir; Neha; Sreesanth	Srishty; Shivashish; Sourabh			Dipika; Sreesanth; Surbhi	Romil; Shivashish; Sreesanth	Karanvir; Megha; Rohit		Deepak; Rohit; Sreesanth	No Jail; Punishment	Jasleen; Megha; Rohit	Deepak; Surbhi	Deepak; Romil; Sreesanth	Deepak; Rohit; Romil	Deepak; Karanvir; Surbhi	Jail Tasks Ended		
Vote to:		None	Evict			None	Evict	None	Evict	Task	Save	Evict			Save	None		Save / Evict	33-Min	None	WIN	
Dipika		Not In House	Kriti; Roshmi; Shivashish; Sourabh; Saba; Somi	Kriti; Roshmi; Anup; Jasleen	Anup; Jasleen	No; Nominations	Sreesanth	No; Nominations	Karanvir; Jasleen; Srishty	Approved	Sreesanth; Karanvir	Urvashi	Surbhi	Dipika	Sreesanth (2x)	Not eligible	No; Nominations	Karanvir (to evict)	45:45 Mins	No; Nominations	No; Nominations	Winner (Day 105)
Sreesanth		Not In House	Kriti; Roshmi; Shivashish; Sourabh; Saba; Somi	Saba; Somi; Kriti; Roshmi	Saba; Somi	No; Nominations	Nominated	Secret Room (Days 24–29)		Approved	Dipika; Shivashish	Megha	House; Captain	Sreesanth	Dipika	Not eligible	No; Nominations	Dipika (to save)	Nominated	No; Nominations	No; Nominations	1st runner-up (Day 105)
	Deepak	Not In House	Dipika; Srishty	Dipika; Neha	Not eligible	No; Nominations	Neha	No; Nominations	Urvashi	Approved	House; Captain		Not eligible	Deepak	Surbhi	Not eligible	No; Nominations	Rohit (to evict)	42:23 Mins	No; Nominations	No; Nominations	Walked, 2nd runner-up (Day 105)
1	Romil	Not In House	Dipika; Srishty	Neha; Dipika	Exempt	House; Captain				Approved	Somi; Surbhi	Urvashi	Not eligible	Not eligible	House; Captain	Not eligible	No; Nominations	Not eligible	Nominated	No; Nominations	No; Nominations	3rd runner-up (Day 105)
1	Romil	Not In House	Dipika; Srishty	Evicted (Day 14)	Exempt	House; Captain				Approved	Somi; Surbhi	Urvashi	Not eligible	Not eligible	House; Captain	Not eligible	No; Nominations	Not eligible	Nominated	No; Nominations	No; Nominations	3rd runner-up (Day 105)
Karanvir		Not In House	Kriti; Roshmi; Shivashish; Sourabh; Saba; Somi	Saba; Somi; Kriti; Roshmi	Deepak; Urvashi	No; Nominations	Nominated	No; Nominations	Karanvir; Jasleen; Srishty	Approved	Srishty; Urvashi	Urvashi	Not eligible	House; Captain	Not eligible	Not eligible	No; Nominations	Deepak (to save)	Nominated	No; Nominations	No; Nominations	4th runner-up (Day 105)
2	Surbhi	Out; House	Evicted (Day 1)		Exempt	House; Captain				Rejected	Romil; Somi	Urvashi	Not eligible	Sreesanth	Somi	House; Captain	No; Nominations	House; Captain		No; Nominations	Evicted (Day 102)	
2	Surbhi	Not; Selected	Evicted (Day 1)		Exempt	House; Captain				Rejected	Romil; Somi	Urvashi	Not eligible	Sreesanth	Somi	House; Captain	No; Nominations	House; Captain		No; Nominations	Evicted (Day 102)	
	Somi	Not In House	Dipika; Srishty	Dipika; Sreesanth	Not eligible	No; Nominations	Neha	No; Nominations	Saba	Approved	Surbhi; Romil	Megha	Not eligible	Deepak	Not eligible	Not eligible	No; Nominations	Romil (to save)	Nominated	Evicted (Day 98)		
Rohit		Not In House								Exempt	Romil; Surbhi	Nominated	Not eligible	Shivashish; Rohit	Not eligible	Not eligible	No; Nominations	Somi (to evict)	Evicted (Day 91)			
	Jasleen	Not In House	Dipika; Srishty	Dipika; Srishty	Not eligible	No; Nominations	Neha	No; Nominations	Karanvir; Jasleen; Srishty	Approved	Shivashish; Sreesanth	Nominated	Not eligible	Jasleen; Srishty	Not eligible	Not eligible	No; Nominations	Evicted (Day 83)				
Megha		Not In House								Anup; Saba; Srishty; Surbhi	Somi; Dipika	Nominated	Deepak	Dipika	Not eligible	Not eligible	No; Nominations	Evicted (Day 83)				
Srishty		Not In House	Kriti; Roshmi; Shivashish; Sourabh; Saba; Somi	Anup; Jasleen; Shivashish; Sourabh	Not eligible	No; Nominations	Neha	No; Nominations	Karanvir; Jasleen; Srishty	Rejected	Karanvir; Urvashi	Urvashi	Romil	Jasleen; Srishty	Not eligible	Evicted (Day 70)						
	Shivashish	Not In House	Dipika; Srishty	Srishty; Neha	Not eligible	No; Nominations	Sreesanth	No; Nominations	Shivashish	House; Captain	Sreesanth; Jasleen	Nominated	Somi	Shivashish; Rohit	Ejected (Day 62)							
	Urvashi	Not In House	Dipika; Srishty	Dipika; Neha	Not eligible	No; Nominations	Neha	No; Nominations	Urvashi	Approved	Srishty; Sreesanth	Nominated	Evicted by Housemates (Day 49)									
	Saba	Not In House	Dipika; Srishty	Dipika; Sreesanth	Not eligible	No; Nominations	Neha	No; Nominations	Saba	Rejected	Evicted (Day 42)											
	Anup	Not In House	Dipika, Srishty	Dipika; Srishty	Not eligible	Secret Room (Days 21–29)				Rejected	Evicted (Day 42)											
	Sourabh	Not In House	Dipika; Srishty	Srishty; Neha	Not eligible	No; Nominations	Sreesanth	No; Nominations	Shivashish	Evicted (Day 35)												
Neha		Not In House	Kriti; Roshmi; Shivashish; Sourabh; Saba; Somi	Shivashish; Sourabh; Kriti; Roshmi	House; Captain	No; Nominations	Nominated	No; Nominations	Evicted (Day 28)													
1	Nirmal	Not In House	Dipika; Srishty	Neha; Dipika	Evicted (Day 14)																	
	Kriti	Out; House	Dipika; Srishty	House; Captain	Evicted (Day 13)																	
	Kriti	Selected	Dipika; Srishty	House; Captain	Evicted (Day 13)																	
	Roshmi	Out; House	Dipika; Srishty	House; Captain	Evicted (Day 13)																	
	Roshmi	Selected	Dipika; Srishty	House; Captain	Evicted (Day 13)																	
Mital		Out; House	Evicted (Day 1)																			
Mital		Not; Selected	Evicted (Day 1)																			
Notes		None	1	2, 3, 4	5	None																
Against public votes		Kriti; Mital; Roshmi; Surbhi	Dipika; Srishty; Kriti; Roshmi; Shivashish; Sourabh; Saba; Somi	Dipika; Karanvir; Kriti; Roshmi; Nirmal; Romil	Anup; Jasleen; Karanvir; Sreesanth; Srishty	Karanvir; Neha; Sreesanth		Karanvir; Neha	Jasleen; Karanvir; Saba; Sourabh; Srishty; Urvashi	Anup; Saba; Srishty; Surbhi	Dipika; Jasleen; Karanvir; Megha; Rohit; Sreesanth; Shivashish; Srishty; Urvashi	Jasleen; Megha; Rohit; Shivashish; Urvashi	Deepak; Romil; Somi; Surbhi	Deepak; Dipika; Jasleen; Shivashish; Sreesanth; Srishty; Rohit	Deepak; Dipika; Jasleen; Karanvir; Megha; Rohit; Srishty	Deepak; Dipika; Jasleen; Megha; Romil		Karanvir; Somi; Rohit	Deepak; Dipika; Karanvir; Somi; Sreesanth; Romil	Deepak; Dipika; Karanvir; Sreesanth; Surbhi; Romil	Deepak; Dipika; Karanvir; Sreesanth; Romil	
Re-entered		none			Romil	none																
Re-entered		none			Surbhi	none																
Secret Room		none				Anup			none													
Secret Room		none				Sreesanth			none													
Ejected		none												Shivashish	none							
Evicted		Mital & Surbhi	No; Eviction	Kriti & Roshmi	No; Eviction	Neha			Sourabh	Anup	Urvashi		No; Eviction		Srishty	No; Eviction	Jasleen	Rohit	Somi	Surbhi	Karanvir	Romil
Evicted		Mital & Surbhi	No; Eviction	Kriti & Roshmi	No; Eviction	Neha			Sourabh	Anup	Urvashi		No; Eviction		Srishty	No; Eviction	Jasleen	Rohit	Somi	Surbhi	Deepak	
Evicted		Mital & Surbhi	No; Eviction	Nirmal & Romil	No; Eviction	Neha			Sourabh	Saba	Urvashi		No; Eviction		Srishty	No; Eviction	Megha	Rohit	Somi	Surbhi	Sreesanth	Dipika

indicates that the Housemate was directly nominated for eviction.
indicates that the Housemate was immune prior to nominations.
indicates the winner.
indicates the first runner up.
indicates the second runner up.
indicates the third runner up.
indicates the fourth runner up.
indicates the contestant has been evicted.
indicates the contestant walked out due to emergency.
indicates the contestant has been ejected.
house captain.
indicates the contestant is nominated.

=== Nomination notes ===
- ^Note 1: The single housemates had to nominate three pairs of the duo housemates and duo housemates had to nominate two of the single housemates. Single housemates chose Dipika and Srishty. Duo housemates chose Kriti, Roshmi; Shivashish, Sourabh and Saba, Somi.
- ^Note 2: Kriti, Roshmi were not given immunity even after they were captains, due to not following house rules.
- ^Note 3: Prior to nominations, Kriti, Roshmi had special power to immune a pair or a single from nominations.
- ^Note 4: Singles were only allowed to nominate pairs and pairs were only allowed to nominate singles.
- ^Note 5: Singles had to demand for something from the Jodi given by Bigg Boss, if the demand was satisfied Jodi was safe & single was nominated, but if not satisfied Jodi was nominated & signal was safe.
