= Koi Laut Ke Aaya Hai =

Indian television drama

- Title card
- Genre: Drama; Thriller; Revenge; Mystery; Suspense; Romance
- Created by: Sphere Origins
- Directed by: Santram Varma
- Creative director: Avhiroop Mazzumdar
- Starring: Surbhi Jyoti; Shoaib Ibrahim; Shaleen Malhotra; Sharad Kelkar
- Theme music composer: Paresh shah
- Opening theme: "Lag Jaa Gale" by Palak Muchhal
- Composer: Lalit Sen
- Country of origin: India
- Original language: Hindi
- No. of seasons: 1
- No. of episodes: 33

Production
- Producers: Sunjoy Waddhwa & Comall Sunjoy W.
- Editor: Sameer Gandhi
- Running time: 45 minutes
- Production company: Sphere Origins

Original release
- Network: STAR Plus
- Release: 25 February – 18 June 2017

Koi Laut Ke Aaya Hai is an Indian suspense psychological thriller television series that was broadcast on Star Plus in 2017. Backed by Sphere Origins, it starred Surbhi Jyoti, Shoaib Ibrahim, Sharad Kelkar, Shaleen Malhotra, Rajsingh Verma and Varun Buddhadev. In June 2021, the series was released as "The Return" on Disney+ Hotstar.

== Plot ==
Rishabh is a blind person who lives with his Rajput family. His sister, Geetanjali falls in love with the military officer Abhimanyu. As Rishabh refuses this alliance, Geetanjali disobeys him and marries Abhimanyu. Though initially outraged, he later accepts Abhimanyu who later dies in a car crash.

=== Six years later ===
As Abhimanyu's body was never found, Geetanjali waits for his return. Her childhood friend, army officer Rajveer Malhotra, reveals that the Indian Army hasn't found any trace of Abhimanyu's survival so he is considered dead. Geetanjali meets a 6 year-old Priyam. Claiming to be Abhimanyu's reincarnation, Priyam is tested to know his identity but surprisingly passes. His greedy parents permit him to be adopted by Rishabh for Geetanjali's sake in exchange for a handsome sum.

Ragini, a stranger claims to be related to Geetanjali. It turns out that Abhimanyu is alive, and finally Geetanjali catches him, who says he betrayed her for revenge against her family. Ratna, Geetanjali's stepmother reveals how she was raped by Abhimanyu's father Bhavani when she was pregnant with his child but he got her married to the widower Rajesh Shekhari, Geetanjali's father. Kavya is in fact Bhavani and Ratna's daughter.

Now, the biggest truth comes out that not Abhimanyu, it is his identical twin Aditya who is seeking revenge from his own family, as Bhavani wanted to kill him in past when it was predicated Aditya would cause his death. But Aditya was saved and raised by another guy with the story of Bhavani's abandonment etched into his soul. So it was Aditya's plan to snatch Abhimanyu's place as he holds him responsible for his abandoning.

Geetanjali plans to rescue Abhimanyu. Rishabh reveals both families had have long enmity between them and how he loved Ragini, who was pregnant with his child and he'd to betray her to believe he had played with her for the pride of his family. Priyam turns out to be their real son Varun. As Bhavani's men had killed Ragini after she gave birth to Varun, he diverted the blame on Rishabh for revenge.

An alive Abhimanyu and Aditya jump from a cliff and fight near jail. Aditya murders Bhavani and tries to kill Geetanjali too, but Rishabh saves her and dies, while she shoots Aditya to death. Rajveer bids adieu saying he got transferred. Geetanjali and Abhimanyu reunite forever and start living happily ever after.

== Cast ==
=== Main ===
- Surbhi Jyoti as Geetanjali "Geetu/Gaura" Singh Rathore: Neelanjali and Rajesh's daughter; Rishabh's sister; Kavya's adopted sister; Rajveer's childhood friend; Abhimanyu's wife
  - Ashnoor Kaur as Child Geetanjali "Geetu" Singh Shekhari
- Shoaib Ibrahim as
  - Captain Abhimanyu Singh Rathore: one of Kalyani and Bhavani's twin sons; Aditya and Ragini's brother; Kavya's half-brother; Geetanjali's husband
  - Aditya Singh Rathore: the other twin son of Kalyani and Bhavani; Abhimanyu and Ragini's brother; Kavya's half-brother
- Shaleen Malhotra as Major Rajveer Malhotra: Geetanjali and Kavya's childhood friend
- Sharad Kelkar as Rishabh Singh Shekhari: Neelanjali and Rajesh's son; Geetanjali's brother; Kavya's stepbrother; Ragini's husband; Varun's father

=== Recurring ===
- Nivedita Bhattacharya as Ratna Devi Chandrani Shekhari: Bhavani's former lover and victim of rape by him; Rajesh's second wife; Kavya's mother; Rishabh and Geetanjali's step-mother; Varun's step-grandmother
- Sreejita De as Kavya Singh Rathore: Ratna and Bhavani's daughter; Rajesh's adopted daughter; Kalyani's step-daughter; Abhimanyu, Aditya and Ragini's half-sister; Rishabh and Geetanjali's sister-in-law/adopted sister; Rajveer's childhood friend
- Varun Buddhadev as Varun Shekhari: Ragini and Rishabh's son; Sunanda and Devki's foster son
- Ekroop Bedi as Chanda Singh
- Megha Gupta as Ragini Shekhari: Kalyani and Bhavani's daughter; Abhimanyu and Aditya's sister; Kavya's half-sister; Rishabh's wife; Geetanjali's sister-in-law; Varun's mother
- Mita Vashisth as Bhairavi "Kalyani" Devi Kashyap Singh Rathore: Bhavani's wife; Ragini, Abhimanyu and Aditya's mother; Kavya's step-mother; Varun's grandmother
- Sudesh Berry as Bhavani Singh Rathore: Ratna's former lover and rapist; Kalyani's husband; Abhimanyu, Aditya, Ragini and Kavya's father; Varun's grandfather
- Raj Singh Verma as Inspector Vijay Salvi
- Mohit Sharma as Sevak Ram Saluja
- Rushad Rana as Devki Nandan Khatri: Sunanda's husband; Varun's foster father
- Sheetal Dabholkar as Sunanda Khatri: Devkinandan's wife; Varun's foster mother
- Darshan Jariwala as Judge Sukesh Jaisingh
- Firoza Khan as Khushi
- Rajesh Kumar as Public Prosecutor Ramveer Shukla
- Dipika Kakar for a special dance performance

== Development ==
On 26 January 2017, the first promo of the show Clock was released by Star Plus on YouTube. On 4 February 2017, the second promo of the show mystery behind the song was released by Star Plus.

The series is set in the backdrop of Rajasthan. Some of the initial scenes were shot in Bikaner, Rajasthan. Some were also shot in Gajner fort.

== Reception ==
India Today stated, "Koi Laut Ke Aaya Hai is a spellbinding psychological thriller that captivates its viewers with interesting plots and thrilling twists. And a welcome change from the ongoing supernatural shows."

The Times of India stated that the plot of this series resembles that of the film Woh Kaun Thi?.

== Recreation ==
In June 2021, it was released on Hotstar with the name "The Return". It gained 10 million + views on the ott platform. This series was only 15 episodes while the original had 33 episodes.
