= Jamai No. 1 =

Indian drama television series

- Genre: Drama; Family
- Screenplay by: Prateek Sharma; Parth Shah
- Directed by: Amar Varpe; Yogesh Pundir
- Starring: Simaran Kaur; Abhishek Malik; Sonal Vengurlekar; Papiya Sengupta; Ashu Sharma; Gaurav Wadhwa; Nishigandha Wad; Aarti Bhagat
- Country of origin: India
- Original language: Hindi
- No. of seasons: 1
- No. of episodes: 251

Production
- Executive producer: Jaya Chandode
- Producers: Prateek Sharma; Parth Shah
- Editor: Amit singh
- Camera setup: Multi-camera
- Running time: 20-25 minutes
- Production company: Studio LSD Private Limited

Original release
- Network: Zee TV
- Release: 9 December 2024 – 31 August 2025

Jamai No. 1 (transl. Son in-law Number 1) is an Indian television series which aired from 9 December 2024 to 31 August 2025 on Zee TV. It was produced by Studio LSD Private Limited and it starred Simaran Kaur and Abhishek Malik in the lead roles.

== Cast ==
=== Main ===
- Simaran Kaur as Riddhi Paranjape (née Chotwani): Kanchan's adoptive daughter; Pratham's elder sister; Neel's wife
- Abhishek Malik as Neel Paranjape; Son of Gangadhar and Sumati; Manjiri's brother; Riddhi's husband

=== Recurring ===
- Sonal Vengurlekar as Saili Deshpande; Neel's childhood friend and one-sided obsessive lover; Riddhi's arch rival;
- Papiya Sengupta as Kanchan Chotwani: Adoptive Mother of Riddhi and Pratham; Neel's rival;
- Sandeep Kapoor / Ashu Sharma as Pramod Shrivastav
- Gaurav Wadhwa as Vicky
- Nishigandha Wad as Uma Dikshit Srivastav
- Ray Parihar as Pratham Chotwani: Kanchan's adoptive son; Riddhi's younger brother; Manjiri's husband;
- Shruti Ghopal as Sumati Paranjape; Gangadhar's wife; Mother of Neel and Manjiri;
- Lokit Phulwani as Lokit
- Aarti Bhagat as Manjiri Paranjape Chotwani; Daughter of Gangadhar and Sumati; Neel's younger sister; Pratham's lover turned wife;
- Saniya Nagdev as Kamlesh
- Dushyant Vora as Gangadhar Paranjape; Sumati's husband; Father of Neel and Manjiri;
- Sahil Arora as Shashank
- Abhinav Gautam as Prakash

=== Guest Appearance ===
Ayushi Khurana as Reet Chaudhary from Jaane Anjaane Hum Mile

Bharat Ahlawat as Raghav Suryavanshi from Jaane Anjaane Hum Mile

== Production ==
=== Development ===
This series is a sequel to Jamai Raja, but the title was changed to Jamai No. 1.

=== Casting ===
Abhishek Malik was confirmed to portrayed male lead, Neel Paranjape. Simaran Kaur also confirmed to play female lead, Riddhi. In March 2025, Papiya Sengupta join the series as Kanchan.
