= Karan Grover =

Indian television actor (born 1982)

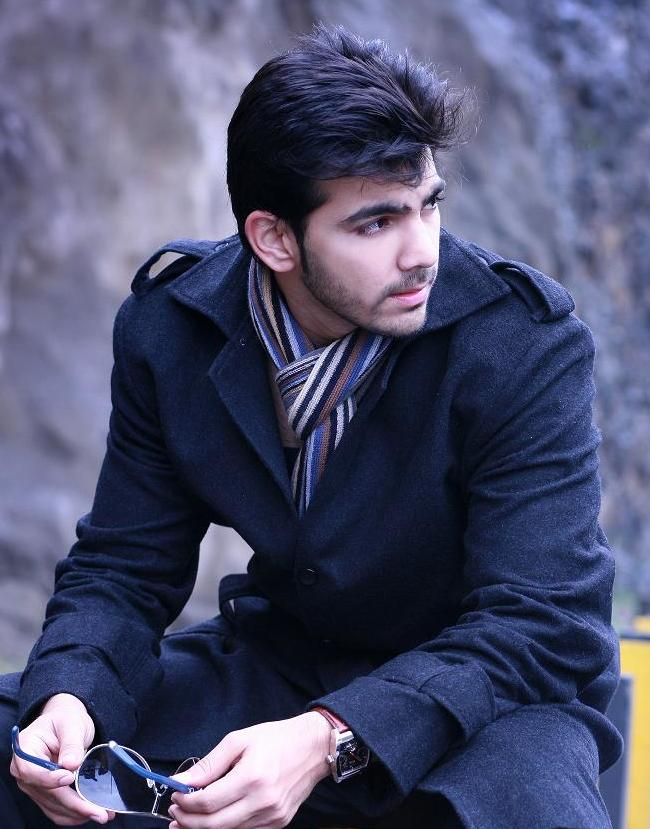
- Born: 22 June 1982 (age 44)
- Education: Institute of Technology, Mumbai
- Occupations: Actor; anchor
- Years active: 2004—present
- Known for: Yahan Main Ghar Ghar Kheli (2009–2012); Bahu Hamari Rajni Kant (2016); Kahaan Hum Kahaan Tum (2019); Udaariyaan (2021)
- Spouse: Poppy Jabbal (m. 2022)

Karan Vipin Grover (born 22 June 1982) is an Indian actor who primarily works in Hindi television. He made his acting debut in 2004 with Saarrthi as Arjun Goenka. Grover is best known for his portrayals of Karan Prasad in Yahan Main Ghar Ghar Kheli (2009–2012), Shantanu "Shaan" Kant in Bahu Hamari Rajni Kant (2016), Dr. Rohit Sippy in Kahaan Hum Kahaan Tum (2019) and Angad Maan in Udaariyaan (2021).

== Early life ==
Grover was born on 22 June 1982. He studied chemical engineering from the Institute of Technology, Mumbai and an event management course from the National Institute of Event Management.

Grover worked as an event manager for a year before receiving an offer to appear on Gladrags.

== Career ==
Grover worked with Omung Kumar's event management company for a year before participating in the Gladrags contest in 2004. He was among the five finalists. He then became a VJ for Zee Music.

He made his acting television debut in 2004 as Arjun Goenka in Saarrthi. After which he appeared in several shows, including Meri Awaz Ko Mil Gayi Roshni, Woh Rehne Waali Mehlon Ki, Yahaaan Main Ghar Ghar Kheli, Hum Aapke Hain In Laws, Teri Meri Love Stories and Lakhon Mein Ek and Punar Vivah. In 2007, he participated in Star Plus's Nach Baliye 3 with Kavita Kaushik.

In 2015, Grover made his film debut with Wedding Pullav where he played J. In 2016, he played Shantanu Kant in Bahu Hamari Rajni Kant opposite Ridhima Pandit. He also appeared in Vikram Bhatt's web series Spotlight 2 which aired on Viu.

From 2019 to 2020, Grover portrayed Dr. Rohit Sippy in Star Plus's Kahaan Hum Kahaan Tum opposite Dipika Kakar. From 2021 to 2022, he playing the role of Angad Maan in Colors TV's popular show Udaariyaan. Since July 2022, he portrayed Ritesh Malhotra in Star Bharat's Bohot Pyaar Karte Hai.

== Personal life ==
Grover married actress Poppy Jabbal in a ceremony held in Himachal Pradesh on 31 May 2022.

== Media image ==
Grover ranked 20th in Times of India's Most Desirable Men on TV list of 2019.

== Filmography ==
=== Films ===
Year	Title	Role	Notes	Ref.
2015	Wedding Pullav	Jay		

=== Television ===
Year	Title	Role	Ref.
2004–2007	Saarrthi	Arjun Goenka	
2006	Ssshhhh...Phir Koi Hai- Dhruvtaal	Aditya	
2007–2008	Meri Awaz Ko Mil Gayi Roshni	Raj Malik	
2007	F.I.R	Karan	
2007	Nach Baliye 3	Contestant (8th Place)	
2008–2009	Woh Rehne Waali Mehlon Ki	Rishabh Rathod	
2008	Ssshhhh...Phir Koi Hai- Chakravyuh	Rajit	
2009–2012	Yahaaan Main Ghar Ghar Kheli	Karan Prasad / Ranchod Tiwari / Siddharth Kumar	
2012	Teri Meri Love Stories	Rohit	
2012	Lakhon Mein Ek	Malhar	
2013	Hum Aapke Hain In Laws	Gulshan Roshanlal Grover	
2013	Punar Vivah - Ek Nayi Umeed	Raj Jakhotia	
2015	Gulmohar Grand	Charlie, a serial killer	
2015	Rishton Ka Mela	Akshay	
2016	Bahu Hamari Rajni Kant	Shantanu Kant/Shaan	
2017	The Drama Company	Host (Season 1)	
2019–2020	Kahaan Hum Kahaan Tum	Dr. Rohit Sippy	
2021–2022	Udaariyaan	Angad Maan	
2021	Udaariyaan	Arjun Maan	
2021	Wagle Ki Duniya – Nayi Peedhi Naye Kissey	Arnav Sachdev	
2022	Bohot Pyaar Karte Hai	Ritesh Malhotra	
2023–2024	Dhruv Tara – Samay Sadi Se Pare	Maharaj Suryapratap Singh	

=== Web series ===
Year	Title	Role	Ref.
2018	Spotlight	Vicky Verma (season 2)	
2018	Vodka Shots	Shalok	
2018	SIT	Rishi	
2024–2025	Dil Ko Rafu Karr Lei	Ishaan	

== Awards and nominations ==
Year	Award	Category	Work	Result	Ref.
2014	Kalakar Award	Best Actor	Punar Vivah – Ek Nayi Umeed		
2019	Gold Awards	Best Actor (Male)	Kahaan Hum Kahaan Tum	Nominated	
2023	Indian Telly Awards	Fan Favourite Negative Lead: Male	Udaariyaan	Won	

== See also ==
- List of Indian television actors
- List of Hindi television actors
- List of Hindi film actors
