= Battalion 609 =

- Film poster
- Directed by: Brijesh Batuknath Tripathi
- Written by: Brijesh Batuknath Tripathi; Bunty Rathore (dialogues)
- Produced by: Naraindas Lalwani
- Starring: Shoaib Ibrahim; Elena Kazan; Farnaz Shetty; Sparsh Sharma; Chandraprakash Thakur; Vishwas Kini; Shree Rammy Pandey Jasbir Thandi as Max (Manmeet Singh)
- Cinematography: Vijay Mishra
- Edited by: Umesh Rane
- Music by: Shailendra Sayanti (film score); Sanidhya Swarna, Sanjay Mahendra Pachauri (lyrics); Sanjay Choudhuri (background score)
- Production company: N. J. Lalwani Films
- Distributed by: Big Curtains Media Private Limited
- Release date: 11 January 2019
- Running time: 143 minutes
- Country: India
- Language: Hindi
- Box office: ₹0.01 Crore

Battalion 609 is a 2019 Indian action film written and directed by Brijesh Batuknath Tripathi and produced by Naraindas Lalwani under his banner N.J Lalwani Films and Executive Producer Shree Rammy Pandey. Starring Shoaib Ibrahim, Elena Kazan, Farnaz Shetty, Sparsh Sharma, Vishwas Kini, Kiaan, Jashn Kohli, Vicky Ahuja, Vikas Srivastava, Chandraprakash Thakur, Manish R. Sharma & Shree Rammy Pandey. It was released on 11 January 2019.

== Plot ==
The story revolves around a friendly cricket match between the Indian Army and the Pakistan Army gone wrong and narrates the tale of the soldiers of Battalion 609 putting up a fight with Taliban. After an attack on the Indian army near the LOC, the match which was to be played between India and Pakistan is cancelled. Anwar Hussein, a Pakistani soldier who is very fond of cricket and was looking forward to the match, throws a cricket bat at the other end of the LOC and calls the Indian army and Indians a bunch of cowards. In anger, the Indian army throws a ball towards them. Soon, a verbal fight breaks between them which leads to the two teams deciding to play a cricket match. The losing team will take their post eighteen kilometres back.

== Cast ==
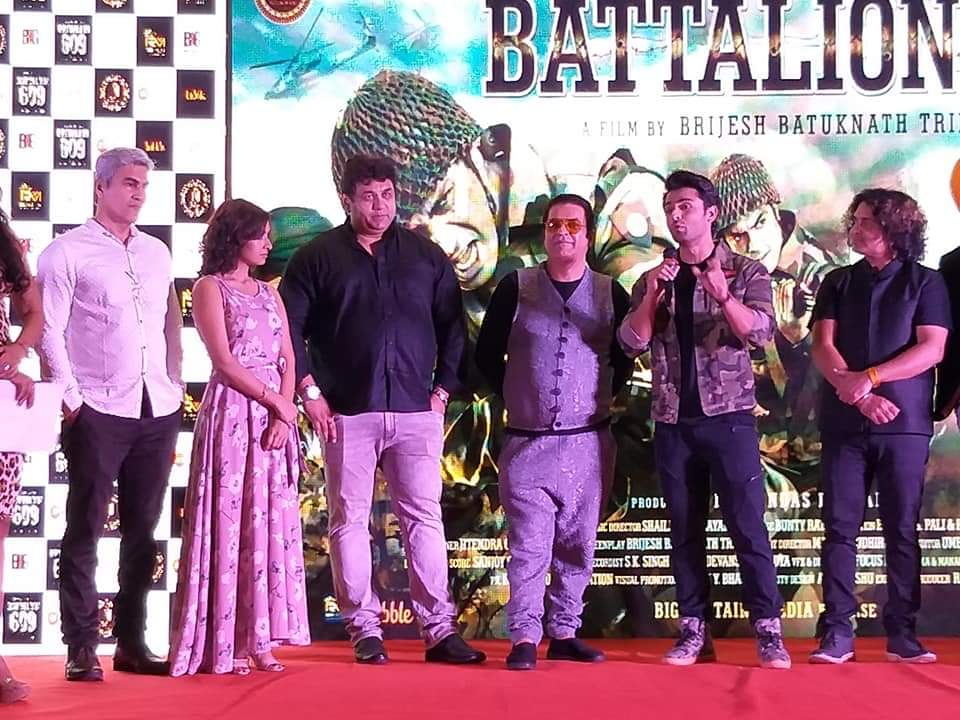
Team Battalion 609 during the Trailer Launch in Mumbai, India

- Shoaib Ibrahim as Kamraj Mishra
- Rima Mishra as Rima
- Sunil Gupta as Sunil
- Elena Kazan as Rukhsana
- Farnaz Shetty as Bijli
- Ram Awana as Maqsood
- Vishwas Kini as Iqbal Qureshi
- Jashan Singh Kohli as Balbeer Singh
- Chandraprakash Thakur as General Yashwant
- Sparsh Sharma as Jassi(Jaspal Singh)
- Major Kishore as Kanan Gopal Rao
- Manish Sharma as Shoaib Jamal
- Vikas Srivastava as Al-Nazar
- Vicky Ahuja
- Shrikant Kamat as Gulshan Pandey
- Shree Rammy Pandey as Major Rammy
- Jasbir Thandi as Max (Manmeet Singh)

== Music ==
Battalion 609

Soundtrack album by Shailendra Sayanti
- Released: 11 January 2019
- Recorded: 2018
- Genre: Feature Film Soundtrack
- Length: 17:01
- Language: Hindi
- Label: Zee Music Company
- Producer: Naraindas Lalwani

The film's soundtrack was composed and produced by Shailendra Sayanti and lyrics were written by Raj Sandilya, Sanjay Mahendra Pachori and Sanidhya Sawarna. Sanjay Choudhuri worked as a guest composer. The first song, "Garam Hai Itnee Body", was sung by Raja Sagoo.

Track listing
No.	Title	Lyrics	Singer(s)	Length
1.	"Garam Hai Itnee Body"	Raj Shandilya	Raja Sagoo	5:30
2.	"Khoya Rahu Tuzme"	Sanjay Mahendra Pachori	Javed Ali	3:22
3.	"Do Peg Peekey Aagayi Angrezi"	Sanjay Mahendra Pachori	Shailendra Kumar	3:32
4.	"Karde Savera"	Sanidhya Sawarna	Shailendra Kumar	4:37
Total length:				17:01
