= Binny Sharma =

Indian television actress

- Born: Ahmedabad, Gujarat, India
- Occupations: Actress, Dancer
- Years active: 2009 - present

Binny Sharma is an Indian television actress and dancer. She was the female lead in Sanjog Se Bani Sangini and Tujh Sang Preet Lagai Sajna (Sahara One). Recently she played the role of Prathibha in Hello Pratibha. She was in Dance India Dance Season 2 (2009) as a contestant, becoming one of the top four finalists. She hails from Punjab, India and has been living in Ahmedabad, Gujarat.

== Filmography ==
=== Films ===
Year	Title	Role	Notes
2013	Amdavad Junction		
2013	Calapor		
2014	Machhli Jal Ki Rani Hai	Item dancer	Special appearance

=== Television ===
Year	Title	Role	Notes
2009	Dance India Dance Season 2	Contestant	3rd runner-up.
2010–2011	Sanjog Se Bani Sangini	Gauri	
2012-2013	Tujh Sang Preet Lagai Sajna (Sahara One)	Meera/Bijli	
2015	Hello Pratibha	Pratibha	
