= Sanjog Se Bani Sangini =

- Logo
- Genre: Drama; Romance
- Directed by: Dharam Dhiman
- Starring: Iqbal Khan; Binny Sharma; For more listings see below
- Theme music composer: Dony Hazarika
- Country of origin: India
- Original language: Hindi
- No. of episodes: 172

Production
- Producers: Tarun Bali; Ajay Kapoor

Original release
- Network: Zee TV
- Release: 16 August 2010 – 2 June 2011

Sanjog Se Bani Sangini is an Indian television series based on the love story of Gauri and Rudra and how these incomplete people complete each other. The series premiered on Zee TV on 16 August 2010 and ended on 2 June 2011. It used to air weekdays at 10pm

== Plot summary ==
Sanjog Se Bani Sangini is the story of Gauri and Rudra — how they meet each other and fall in love.

Gauri (Binny Sharma) is gentle and modest, yet brave. She handles her household responsibilities, belying the convention that only males are the providers. Her life takes a dramatic turn when one day a young man, Rudra (Mohammed Iqbal Khan), rams his car into her shop and destroys her means of livelihood. From that moment onwards, Gauri and Rudra's destinies cross. First they are strangers but, eventually, circumstances bring them together as best friends. Gauri is trying to help Rudra marry Pihu (Additi Gupta), the love of his life. Pihu and Rudra had a fight, and she ended their relationship. Pihu ends up marrying Abhay (Raunaq Ahuja), a doctor, because of her ego and wish to show Rudra she doesn't need him. Gauri (who has started to fall in love with Rudra) helps him out of depression. Day by day, Rudra is becoming closer to Gauri and Pihu cannot accept that. Abhay is very disturbed because he sees that Pihu hasn't forgotten Rudra.

Soon, Rudra plans to get Gauri married to a boy who loves her. Gauri reluctantly accepts the proposal. Hearing from Abhay that Gauri helped him to marry Pihu, Rudra gets drunk and, in anger, crashes Gauri's marriage. Being out of his senses, Rudra forcibly marries Gauri. As time passes, Rudra finds out that Abhay had lied and accepts Gauri as his wife. But he tells her that he cannot love her for he will always love Pihu. Gauri comes to his house with him.

Rudra's mother Rajrani (Aruna Irani) cannot accept Gauri as his wife, so she calls Pihu and tells her to create differences between Gauri and Rudra. Pihu takes advantage of this as she too cannot stand seeing Rudra with someone else, and makes a plan in which she is to marry Rudra. Rudra's mom later accepts Gauri for she finds out about Pihu's evil intentions. Together, they reveal the truth. Rudra sees Pihu's true colors, and kicks her out of the house. When Rudra finds out that at first it was his mom's plan to create differences, he and Gauri move out of the house and start living in a working-class neighbourhood. Gradually, Rudra forgets Pihu and he falls in love with Gauri.

Pihu loses her mind and becomes crazy for she cannot accept that Rudra hates her. Then Abhay tries to take revenge from Rudra and Gauri by breaking their marriage. He kidnaps Gauri, gets her unconscious and arranges for a man named Ram Mathur (Vikas Bhalla) to marry her. Ram is in love with Gauri, and he did not know she was already married. Rudra fights with Abhay and saves Gauri. Abhay dies.

After six months, Ram marries Rudra's sister to get revenge. Rudra and Ram have a fight and Rudra is hit on the head, causing him to lose his memory. Ram goes to jail. Rudra does not remember what happened in the past three years. He doesn't remember meeting Gauri and falling in love with her. He doesn't remember marrying her and that she is carrying his child. He thinks he is still in love with Pihu. The doctor tells everyone that he must not be forced to remember anything. Hence, Rudra's mom wants Gauri to stay away from Rudra. Gauri asks Pihu, who is now a medical student, to act like she still loves Rudra. Pihu tries to refuse but Gauri makes her promise to pretend she is in love with Rudra. Pihu's aunt instigates her to take advantage of the opportunity. Rudra wants to get together with Pihu and schedules their marriage. Pihu, while acting like she loves Rudra, really falls for him again and wants to marry him. Gauri knows Pihu's intentions, but has faith that the Rudra will remember everything before the marriage.

During the wedding ceremony, Rudra realizes that Gauri is his wife. But Gauri has already left the house because Rajrani told her to leave him alone. Rudra and Gauri get back together and Pihu admits her mistake. She says that there is no first or second love; there is just true love, which is shared by Gauri and Rudra. Gauri becomes a mother to a baby boy, which Pihu helps to deliver. A year later, Pihu announces that Gauri is pregnant again, with a baby girl. While Rudra holds Gauri and says " who said you only love once?"

== Cast ==
- Mohammad Iqbal Khan as Rudra Singh Rawat
- Moorti Persaud as Nandini
- Binny Sharma as Gauri Sharma / Gauri Rudra Singh Rawat
- Additi Gupta as Priyamvada (Pihu)
- Sandeep Baswana as Ratnesh Singh Rawat
- Trishna Vivek as Ketki Ratnesh Singh Rawat
- Vikas Bhalla as Ram Mathur
- Aruna Irani as Rajrani Singh Rawat
- Sudha Chandran / Kunickaa Sadanand as Kalavati
- Samta Sagar as Sunheri
- Raunaq Ahuja as Dr. Abhay
- Deepak Qazir as Mr. Rawat (Dadaji)
- Mehul Buch as Raajrani's husband
- Karan Godhwani as Shankar
- Suhita Thatte as Mrs. Mathur

== Rebroadcasts ==
Sangini is online in Romania on Brilliant Novelas (subtitled in Romanian).

== Awards ==
Zee Rishtey Awards 2010

- Favourite Bhabhi - Ketki Bhabhi
- Favourite Khalnayak (tie) - Rajrani & Nani
- Zee Parivaar Ka Naya Sadasya (Female) - Gauri
- Favourite Popular Face (Male) - Rudra

== Crossover ==
17 January 2011 with Pavitra Rishta and Ram Milaayi Jodi.

23 May 2011 with Pavitra Rishta, Ram Milaayi Jodi and Sanskaar Laxmi (First time in history 4 shows coming together for a Maha Sangram).
