= Yeh Ishq Haaye =

- Genre: Drama
- Creative director: Neha Kothari
- Starring: See below
- Theme music composer: T Series
- Opening theme: Mohit Pathak Alisha Chinoy
- Country of origin: India
- Original language: Hindi
- No. of seasons: 1
- No. of episodes: 226

Production
- Production company: Sphere Origins

Original release
- Network: STAR One
- Release: 1 November 2010 – 6 August 2011

Yeh Ishq Haaye is an Indian television series that aired on STAR One. The show premiered on 1 November 2010 and ran till 6 August 2011.

== Plot ==
Yeh Ishq Haaye is set in small town Agra and traces the lives of childhood friends Manjari and Akshay. Manjari Chaturvedi is a carefree teenager who likes to hang out with her friends. Akshay runs a café and has secretly been in love with Majari for a long time. Pooja, Manjari's elder sister, falls for Akshay after a misunderstanding leads her to believe that he returns her feelings. Manjari instead falls in love with Ranveer. Akshay, on Manjari's insistence gets engaged to Pooja.

Tired of her carefree attitude, Manjari's parents want to get her married so she settles down but Manjari decides to run away to Mumbai on Ranveer's advice. Akshay insists on accompanying her and on reaching Mumbai, they realise that Ranveer is in fact Sanjay and he cheats girls using a fake identity. Akshay and Manjari later decide to stay in Mumbai and make a name for themselves. Manjari starts to fall in love with Akshay but stays away from him as he is Pooja's fiancé. Back in Agra, Pooja learns of Akshay's feelings for Manjari. She comes to Mumbai and plans to separate them but later realizes their love and leaves.

Despite their challenges, Manjari and Akshay finally unite.

== Cast ==
- Srishty Rode as Manjari Chaturvedi
- Neetu Naval Singh as Pooja Chaturvedi: Manjari's elder sister
- Raunaq Ahuja as Akshay Shukla: Manjari's childhood friend who has been in love with her
- Jaya Ojha as Mrs. Chaturvedi: Pooja and Manjari's mother
- Pankaj Berry as Mr. Chaturvedi: Pooja and Manjari's father
- Rahul Arora as Sanjay Sharma
- Anand Suryavanshi as Ranveer Malhotra
- Yashdeep Nain as Ajay Shukla: Akshay's brother
- Sujata Thakkar as Mrs. Shukla: Akshay and Ajay's mother
