= Biwi =

Biwi (meaning wife in Urdu) may refer to:

== Films & TV Series ==
- Biwi-O-Biwi, a 1981 romantic-comedy Hindi movie.
- Biwi No.1, a 1999 Indian Hindi-language comedy film.
- Saheb, Biwi Aur Gangster, a 2011 Indian romantic thriller film
- Saheb, Biwi Aur Gangster 3, is a 2018 Indian crime thriller film
- Saheb, Biwi Aur Gangster Returns, is a 2013 Indian romantic thriller drama film directed by Tigmanshu Dhulia
- Meri Hanikarak Biwi, is an Indian drama series that airs on &TV and stars Karan Suchak and Jiya Shankar
- Meri Biwi Ka Jawaab Nahin, is a 2004 Indian film directed by Pankaj Parashar
- Biwi Ho To Aisi, is a 1988 Bollywood film, directed and written by J.K. Bihari
- Dusri Biwi, is a 2014 Pakistani drama serial directed by Anjum Shahzad
- Sahib Biwi Gulam, is a 2004 Indian television series aired on Sahara One channel
- Meri Biwi Ki Shaadi, is a 1979 Bollywood comedy film directed by Rajat Rakshit
- Mujhe Meri Biwi Se Bachaao, is a 2001 Indian film directed by Harry Baweja
- Biwi Aur Makan, is a 1966 Hindi film directed by Hrishikesh Mukherjee
- Sahib Biwi Aur Boss, is a 2015 Indian television sitcom, aired on SAB TV
- Naukar Biwi Ka, is a 1983 Hindi comedy film, a remake of the Punjabi film Naukar Wohti Da (1974)
- Aashiq Biwi Ka, is a 2009 Hindi language Indian comedy series aired on DD National channel
- TV, Biwi aur Main, is a 2017 Indian sitcom series aired on SAB TV
- Jo Biwi Se Kare Pyaar, a 2013 Indian television series aired on SAB TV
- Mian Biwi Razi, is a 1982 comedy–drama film directed by Sangeeta
- Maa Bahen Aur Biwi, is a 1974 Bollywood drama film directed by Harbans Kumar.
- Kiski Biwi, is a 1942 Bollywood film

== Places ==
Biwi, Malawi, a populated place in Lilongwe District, Central Region, Malawi.
