= Kanavu Variyam =

2017 Indian film by Arun Chidambaram

- Poster
- Directed by: Arun Chidambaram
- Written by: Arun Chidambaram
- Produced by: Dr. A. Chidambaram; Karthik Chidambaram
- Starring: Arun Chidambaram; Jiya Shankar
- Cinematography: S. Selvakumar
- Edited by: Gaugin
- Music by: Shyam Benjamin
- Production company: DCKAP Cinemas
- Distributed by: Warner Bros. Pictures
- Release date: 24 February 2017
- Country: India
- Language: Tamil

Kanavu Variyam (transl. Dream Factory) is a 2017 Indian Tamil-language drama film written and directed by Arun Chidambaram and produced by DCKAP cinemas. The film stars Chidambaram in the lead role alongside Jiya Shankar and revolves around power cuts and electricity deficit in the villages of Tamil Nadu, India. Featuring a predominantly new cast and crew, the film was distributed by Warner Bros. Pictures as their first South Indian film.

Prior to its theatrical release, the film was screened at several international film festivals and received a number of awards and recognition. Among its titles, Kanavu Variyam won the Platinum Remi for Best Independent Theatrical Feature Film (Drama) and the same was awarded at the 49th WorldFest Houston International Film Festival. The film also won the Special Jury Award at National Science Film Festival and Competition in India. Kanavu Variyam was released across India on 24 February 2017.

== Plot ==
Ezhil (Arun Chidambaram) is a brilliant school student. He excels in all subjects and is favorite among teachers. Ezhil grows up with his interest in science. Days pass as Ezhil is now a teenager and an aspiring scientist. His father (Ilavarasu) supports him in his dream, while his mother (Senthi Kumari) does not. Their village often lands in electricity deficits and power cuts. Ezhil aspires to invent a machine to deal with it. Ezhil's crush Veena (Jiya Shankar) and friend Sakkarai (Black Pandi) help him in his research and ideas. Ezhil decides to do it through some waste materials and simple objects such as motors, batteries, etc. He studies the structure of windmills and their works. He then gets an idea about it. When Ezhil constructs a model of the windmill, he faces many obstacles from the villagers on the way, and how he manages to invent it forms the rest of the story.

== Cast ==
- Arun Chidambaram as Ezhil
- Jiya Shankar as Veena
- Ilavarasu as Ezhil's father
- Yog Japee as Gopi
- Black Pandi as Sakkarai
- Senthi Kumari as Ezhil's mother
- G. Gnanasambandam as Gnanasambandan
- T. P. Gajendran
- Mayilsamy as Mahout
- Kavithalaya Krishnan as Teacher
- Crane Manohar
- George Maryan
- Lollu Sabha Easter as TNEB worker
- Ambani Shankar
- Saravana Subbiah as Gopi's boss
- Arumugam
- Vijay Ganesh as Azhagu
- R. S. G. Chelladurai as Doctor

== Production ==
The film's writer, director and lead actor Arun Chidambaram returned to Chennai from his corporate job in Chicago to begin working on the film. Shot entirely in Tamil Nadu during late 2015, Arun Chidambaram revealed that Kanavu Variyam was about the shortage of electricity in the villages of India and would have a theatrical release following an extended circuit of international film festivals. The film was produced by Arun's brother Karthik, while Shyam Benjamin worked on the film's soundtrack and Selvakumar associated with the project as the cinematographer. Hindi television actress Jiya Shankar debuted in films as the lead actress, while Ilavarasu, Black Pandi, G. Gnanasambandam, Yog Japee, and Senthi Kumari all enacted supporting roles.

Kanavu Variyam received media attention within Tamil Nadu, after it was announced that Warner Bros. Pictures had associated with the project as a distributor, marking the first collaboration of the Hollywood studio with a South Indian film. The film's teaser was launched by music director Yuvan Shankar Raja, and received attention from several film industry personalities. The launch of the soundtrack and trailer took place at Prasad Labs in Chennai in February 2017. Along with the whole film crew, it was attended by renowned personalities including film director Bharathiraja, space scientist K. Sivan, Tamil Nadu meteorologist Pradeep John, and designer Udaya Kumar. During the event, in recognition of his scientific achievements, K. Sivan, was conferred with the title "Inspiring Scientist of India" at the event, owing to theme of the film. Bharathiraja was conferred the title "Inspiring Director of India" for his achievements in the film industry, and Sirkazhi Sivachidambaram was conferred with the title "Inspiring Voice of India" award. Further awards were handed to the other chief attendees of the event.

== Soundtrack ==
Kanavu Variyam

Soundtrack album by Shyam Benjamin
- Released: 8 February 2017
- Genre: Feature film soundtrack
- Label: Trend Music
- Producer: Shyam Benjamin

Shyam Benjamin chronology
Kalavu Thozhirchalai (2014)	Kanavu Variyam (2017)

The music of Kanavu Variyam was composed by Shyam Benjamin. "Kalla/Manna", a song from the film which refers to 51 traditional games of rural India, won the Silver Remi for Best Children's Song and won the Best Youth Focus Music Video award at the Bare Bones International Film and Music Festival at Oklahoma, USA.

Tamil
No.	Title	Lyrics	Singer(s)	Length
1.	"Kalla Manna"	Arun Chidambaram	Mithuna, Sai Rishi, Sai Lakshmi	4:26
2.	"Nee Paadhi"	Arun Chidambaram	Guna, Mahalakshmi Iyer	4:14
3.	"Science Is Fun"	Arun Chidambaram	Sharmila	3:06
4.	"Kirukkan"	Arun Chidambaram	Sirkazhi G. Sivachidambaram	3:06

== Release ==
The film's world premiere was at the 49th WorldFest Houston International Film Festival on 9 April 2016.

=== Critical reception ===
Prior to its theatrical release, Kanavu Variyam received critical acclaim in major film festivals across the globe. News portals including The Hindu, NDTV, Dina Thanthi highly appreciated the preview shows of the film and stated "Arun is a director to watch out for".

The film had a theatrical release across Tamil Nadu on 24 February 2017. The New Indian Express called the film a "feel-good entertainer", adding that "when many of our makers look towards the West for inspiration, it is heartwarming that the U.S. based-Chidambaram has turned to the rural scenario and the issues faced by the villagers as his debut work" and that "the film is inspiring and motivating, is worth a watch by both adults and children. It's a powerful debut by multi-faceted artist Arun Chidambaram'. Number 1 weekly in Tamil Nadu, "Ananda Vikatan" quoted the film to be a "powerful cinema which inspires the dreamer in you". Dina Thanthi, the highest read daily in the state quoted "A must-watch entertainer for families". Other critics gave the film a less welcoming review, with The Times of India stating "as a director, though his plot and intention is commendable, amateurish execution and slow screenplay spoil the flow of the narration". Sify.com wrote "on the whole, a weak script that lacks subtlety and nuance, the film is ultimately a bore" and that "though the intentions of director Arun Chidambaram is laudable, his bumbling execution is a spoiler". Sowmya Rajendran of The News Minute also criticised the film stating "science can explain several phenomena, but I am still wondering what explains the film's success and the reputation it has built for itself", stating that she was "deeply puzzled" with the film's success on the international circuit.

=== Awards and recognitions ===
Kanavu Variyam has received the following recognitions following its preview shows and participation in international film festivals:

- 'Platinum Remi Award' for "Best Independent Theatrical Feature Film" (Drama) at 49th WorldFest-Houston, USA 2016. "Kanavu Variyam" was chosen from over 4500 movies from 74 countries.
- 'Silver Remi Award' for 'Best Children's Song' at 49th WorldFest-Houston, USA 2016.
- 'Audience Favorite Movie' at 49th WorldFest-Houston 2016.
- 'Best Unique Film' at "International Motivational Film Festival" 2016 held at Rostov, Russia.
- 'Special Jury Award' at National Science Film Festival and Competition organized by the Government of India.
- 'Best Youth Focus Music Video' award for the song "Kalla Manna (Stone or Sand)" at Bare Bones International Film and Music Festival. held in USA.
- 'Best Music Video' for the song "Kalla Manna (Stone or Sand)" at Los Angeles Film and Script Festival, USA.
- Official Selection at 19th Shanghai International Film Festival. held in China.
- 'Opening Film' at 15th Pyonyang International Film Festival' in North Korea scheduled from 16 to 23 September.
- Nominated for "Best Feature Film" and "Best Cinematography" at "Asian New Media Festival" in Busan, South Korea - a film festival organized by General Association of Korean movies, Korean Film Critics Association, and the Shanghai Film Academy.
- Official Selection at 'International Children's Film Festival' in Dytiatko, Ukraine scheduled from 21 to 24 September.
- Official Selection at '67th Montecatini International Film Festival' in Italy scheduled from 6–9 October.
- Official Selection at '11th Lola Kenya Screen Film Festival' in Kenya scheduled in December.
