= Ek Nayi Chhoti Si Zindagi =

Indian television series

- Ek nayi choti si zindagi
- Created by: Hats Off Productions
- Written by: Sonali Jaffar; Gaurav Sharma
- Directed by: Faatimah Malik
- Starring: Richa Mukherjee/Toral Rasputra as Isha Shruti Bisht/Leena Jumani as Ira
- Country of origin: India
- Original language: Hindi
- No. of seasons: 1
- No. of episodes: 188

Production
- Executive producers: Dharmendrasinh Raj; Suchita Chauhan
- Producers: J.D. Majethia; Aatish Kapadia
- Editors: Dharmesh Patel; Srichand Dasnam
- Camera setup: Multi-camera
- Running time: approximately 24 minutes
- Production company: Hats Off Productions

Original release
- Network: Zee TV
- Release: April 4, 2011 – March 21, 2012

Chhoti Si Zindagi — later renamed Ek Nayi Chhoti Si Zindagi — (International Title: Silver Lining) was an Indian television series that aired on Zee TV. It was based on the lives of two orphan sisters, Isha and Ira. It was produced by J.D. Majethia's Hats Off Productions and shot in areas in Northern India like Kasauli, Himachal Pradesh. The series premiered on 4 April 2011 and starred Pavan Malhotra and Sushmita Mukherjee.

== Plot ==
The story portrays the lives of two orphan girls, Isha and Ira who do not give up despite facing many hardships in life. Their mother died after Ira's birth and their father has to give them up because he is marrying someone else due to financial issues. He sends them to live in an orphanage with Devki and her brother Bhola.

At first, Isha and Ira are disliked by the kids at the orphanage because they escaped and the others had to starve, but Isha comes back because of Ira's declining health and injured leg. Devki constantly tries to separate the sisters by telling Ira bad stuff about Isha. Also, Isha finds out that Tinnu (a boy whom was helped by Isha and Ira when he once escaped the orphanage just like them, but was later caught by Bhola) is in the dark room and he had to starve because he helped Isha escape.

Meanwhile, Vrinda, the eldest and in charge of all the children, hates Isha because she causes a lot of trouble for them. But one day, when a guy named Arjun comes to deliver food, he meets Vrinda. They become friends and eventually fall in love. Bhola finds out and warns Vrinda. To get revenge, Vrinda mixes spices in Bhola's breakfast. Bhola tells Devki and threatens Isha to tell the truth. Devki says that she will accept any condition if she says who did it. Isha takes the blame and tells Devki to release Tinnu, who has become ill. Thakur and Fatima begin liking Isha but Vrinda and Cutting are still upset. Thakur, Fatima, and Isha try to take care of Tinnu but their efforts are in vain. Isha collects money and the kids help her. Vrinda comes, wanting to help and that prove she's better than Isha, so they tell Vrinda to try to convince Devki to get a doctor. The doctor comes and cures Tinnu.

A friendship begins between Isha and Vrinda, but Devki ruins it as she degrades Vrinda and announces Isha as the new manager for the kids, making Vrinda to hate her more. Arjun disguises himself as a famous businessman on the pretence of that wanting to adopt Vrinda. He talks to Vrinda alone and they both confess their love to each other. Bhola finds out that that man was Arjun and tells Devki. Isha warns Vrinda about it and Arjun leaves, she covers up the ordeal. Devki tells her men to check all of Vrinda's belongings and a letter that Arjun wrote to Vrinda falls out and Bhola sees this. When Devki is about to take it, Isha takes it first and eats it. When Devki is about to beat Isha, Ira bites her arm. Devki tries to hit Ira but Isha stops her. Isha tells her that while she is here she will change everything. Devki is embarrassed and leaves. Vrinda apologizes to Isha for being mean to her and they both become friends.

Outside, Tinnu sees Bhola and Devki talking to a foreigner. After the foreigner leaves, Devki tells the kids that she is sorry and tells them that they could do whatever they want to. Tinnu suspects her and tells Isha and Vrinda about this. Isha follows Devki and Bhola and finds out that the foreigner is the owner of the biggest adoption center in America. He wants two little cute girls so he can take them to America and someone could adopt them. Devki wants to sell Ira and Chutki to the foreigner. Isha is shocked and tells Arjun, Vrinda and Tinnu. When Devki is giving Ira and Chutki to the foreigner, Chetna comes. Devki kicks the foreigner out immediately. Every one were confused. They think that Chetna will buy one of the kids but Isha finds out that Chetna is the real owner of the place. She is really nice to all the children, gives them new clothes, good food, and new toys. On the day of Isha's birthday, Chetna organises a party for her. But Isha, Tinnu, Vrinda and all the kids plan to get Devki and Bhola kicked out from the orphanage. Isha calls some people to buy a child. Chetna sees this and Devki blames it on Bhola, who is then kicked out.

They all celebrate Isha's birthday and everyone is happy. Later one day, Isha goes to buy groceries with Calender. She sees a boy asking everyone about an orphanage and thinks he is a pickpocket. When he comes to her, they both drop their papers. Isha's paper had the groceries list and items, and his has the address to the orphanage. They accidentally pick up the wrong paper and he follows her there. He comes to the orphanage and everyone finds out his name: Samarth or Sam. He came from America and is Chetna's grandson. He tells everyone to hide him from Chetna for two days so Chetna doesn't send him back. Chetna gets a phone call from his mom saying he was supposed to go to summer camp but he's not there. Chetna is really worried and Devki thinks it's a good opportunity to send Chetna back but Isha tells her the truth. Sam is mad at Isha for telling Chetna the truth. Sam convinces Chetna to go to America with him and she agrees. Everyone is upset while Devki is happy. Meanwhile, Tinnu and Sam constantly fight a lot and argue. They both hate each other. Chetna borrows a baby from one of the guards and tells everyone on the street that until she is not adopted she won't go anywhere. The kids are all happy. Chetna tells Isha; she did it all this so Sam could become a responsible person. She assigns Isha, Tinnu and Sam to take care of the baby. Sam and Tinnu try to get along but they still fight. Sam is changing. Chetna is proud of Isha. Devki in a fit of greed for money teams up with Sam's mother to burn the orphanage. This causes all of the kids to be separated from each other, even Isha and Ira.

=== Ten years later ===
Isha tries to find Ira with the help of Devki. Isha works at a radio station as DJ Palak and has to go by the name Palak. Her only aim in joining the radio station is to find her sister, Ira. She hopes and prays Ira will listen to her and recognize her.

Ira grows up to be a rich spoiled brat. However, there is a humane side to her too. She grows up hating Isha because she believes Isha chose Kuhu over her.

Angry about her past, Ira erases all memories of her childhood and even assumes a new identity. She changes her name to Kajal Kaushal. However, destiny brings Isha and Ira together once again. Unaware of their shared past, the duo meet and become best friends, as Ira invites DJ Palak (Isha) to her 18th birthday party and Isha finds it awkward that Kajal and Ira's birthday is on the same day. Everyone is happy until police come and arrest everyone at the party because there was something wrong. Palak doesn't get arrested because she was from the radio station and she helps Kajal by saying that she works there to.

Fate brings Samarth Ojha and Isha together too when he joins Isha's radio station as a trainee. Samarth Ojha (Sam) has come from abroad and joins the radio as a trainee. But Isha and the whole office discover that Sam is actually the owner of the radio station, he joins as a trainee because he learns that there was a lot of mess and fraud in the radio station.

Isha and Ira are reunited, but Ira still hates Isha. Revati (Samarth's mom) absolutely loathes Isha and fills Ira's heart with hate towards her sister. Isha and Sam are to be married and Ira and Revati conjure many plans to stop the wedding. Isha finds out that Ira still loves Sam and hates her. Isha lets Ira marry Sam, but instead she marries Shravan (One of Palak's fans and is in love with Isha) who tied Sam up. Shravan and Ira don't get on, and they make each other miserable. Revathi pushes Isha off the balcony and thinks Isha is dead. Later on Ira and Shravan fall in love, Ira also realises her mistakes and apologises to Isha. Isha is haunting Revathi, and Isha is revealed to be alive, with the help of the family Revathi is exposed and arrested. A young boy comes to the House which is later revealed to be the sisters younger half brother Govinda. Revathi escapes jail and kidnaps Govinda, but his family saves him. Revathi is arrested again. Isha and Ira are reunited with their father. Govinda draws a picture which he names Chhoti si Zindagi. The sisters have their happy ending.

== Other telecasts ==
It came back on 3 January 2012 on Disney Channel India. It was picked up for 18 episodes, then 26, then 88.

=== Arabic version (Zee Aflam) النسخة العربية ===
An Arabic dubbed version aired on Zee Aflam in 2015. It was renamed Ghader Al-Zaman (غدر الزمن) which literally translates to The Treachery of Time. The Arabic dubbed version on Zee Aflam featured several changes:

- The episode intro and end song was replaced by an exclusive Arabic song written and composed for the show. it was sung by Karol Own (كارول عون). The original song is still heard through the episodes.
- Character names were changed: Isha being Rasha, Ira being Lara, Shyam being Sham, Vrinda being Linda, Tinnu being Ma'amoon, Chutki being Noor, Devki being Anaheed, Bhola being Fouad, Chetna being Shukran, and Revati being Rania.

== Cast and characters ==
=== Main ===
- Toral Rasputra as Isha Ojha / Palak – Shyam's elder daughter; Ira's sister; Sam's wife
  - Richa Mukherjee as Child Isha
- Leena Jumani as Ira / Kajal Kaushal – Shyam's younger daughter; Isha's sister; Shravan's wife
  - Shruti Bisht as Child Ira
- Vipul Gupta as Samarth "Sam" Ojha – Revati and Girish's son; Kuhu's brother; Isha's childhood friend turned husband
  - Khurram Khan as Young Sam
- Aham Sharma as Shravan – Isha's obsessive one sided ex-lover; Ira's husband

=== Recurring ===
- Pavan Malhotra as Shyam (father of Isha and Ira)
- Bharti Patil as Stepmother of Isha and Ira
- Sushmita Mukherjee as Devki (orphanage warden)
- Sachal Tyagi as Bhola (Devki's brother)
- Jay Thakkar as Thakur
- Jayesh Kardak as Cutting
- Chinky Jaiswal as Fatima
- Ananya Agarwal as Chutki
- Sonakshi More as Vrinda
- Fahad Ali as Tinnu (Isha and Ira's childhood friend)
  - Deiptimaan Chowdhury as Young Tinnu
- Prasad Barve as Calendar (orphanage's cook)
- Chirag Vohra as Raju
- Vaishnavi Macdonald as Harini
- Nishant Raghuwanshi as Arjun
- Swati Chitnis as Chetna Aunty (founder and owner of the orphanage)
- Pyumori Mehta as Arjun's mother.
- Manini Mishra / Mrinal Deshraj as Revati (Sam and Kuhu's mother, Girish's wife)
- Mihir Mishra as Girish (Revati's husband and Sam and Kuhu's father)
- Aashish Kaul as Manoj
