= Karan Suchak =

Indian television actor (born 1986)

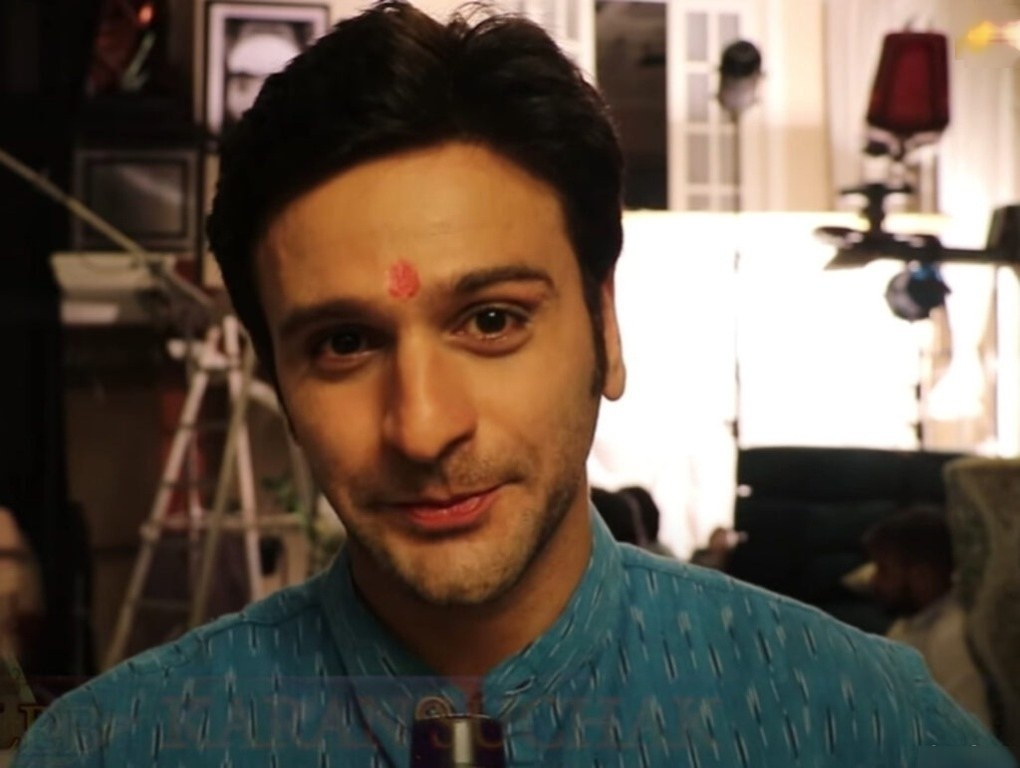
- Born: 2 August 1986 (age 39); Ahmedabad, Gujarat, India
- Occupation: Actor
- Years active: 2013–present

Karan Suchak is an Indian television actor. He is known for his role of Lakshman in Siya Ke Ram, Akhilesh Pandey in Meri Hanikarak Biwi, Dr. Anurag Basu in Thoda Sa Badal Thoda Sa Paani, and Draupadi's brother Dhrishtadyumna in the epic TV series Mahabharat on Star Plus.

== Early life and career ==
Suchak was born in Ahmedabad and is a Gujarati. He debuted in TV serials with a supporting role of Sambhav Malik in Star Plus's Ek Hazaaron Mein Meri Behna Hai and secondly appeared in Life OK's Savitri - Ek Prem Kahani as Vikrant.

In the last quarter of 2013, he entered Ekta Kapoor's popular daily TV soap Pavitra Rishta in the role of Shekhar Gupta. Few months later he was noticed when he began portraying Draupadi's brother Dhrishtadyumna in the epic TV series Mahabharat on Star Plus. Suchak portrayed Vikramaditya in Sony Pal's Sinhasan Battisi from 2014–2015.

In 2015, he was roped in for Maharakshak: Devi. Next, he bagged Star Plus's Siya Ke Ram as Lakshman. In 2017, Suchak was seen in historic series Peshwa Bajirao as Bajirao Bhatt alongside Megha Chakraborty and Ishita Ganguly.

In October 2017, he was signed in for And TV's new venture Meri Hanikarak Biwi to star opposite Jiya Shankar as Akhilesh Pandey. The series premiered in December 2017 and went off air after a good TV run in December 2019. From 2021 to 2022, he appeared as Dr. Anurag Basu in Colors TV's show Thoda Sa Badal Thoda Sa Paani opposite Ishita Dutta.

== Personal life ==
He is married to his long time girlfriend Nandita. The two first met for professional reasons when Nandita was into celebrity marketing.

== Television ==
Year	Serial	Role	Notes
2013	Ek Hazaaron Mein Meri Behna Hai	Sambhav Malik	
2013	Savitri - Ek Prem Kahani	Vikrant	
2013–2014	Pavitra Rishta	Shekhar Gupta	
2014	Mahabharat	Yuvraj Dhrishtadyumna	
2014–2015	Sinhasan Battisi	Maharaj Vikramaditya	
2015	Maharakshak: Devi	Devrishi Narada / Inspector Prakash Narayan	
2015–2016	Siya Ke Ram	Rajkumar Lakshman	
2017	Peshwa Bajirao	Bajirao Bhatt	
2017–2019	Meri Hanikarak Biwi	Akhilesh "Gullu" Pandey	
2021–2022	Thoda Sa Badal Thoda Sa Paani	Dr. Anurag Basu	
2021	Sirf Tum	Dr. Anurag Basu	For New Year Celebration
2022	Jai Hanuman – Sankatmochan Naam Tiharo	Rajkumar Rama	
2022	Swaraj	Mangal Pandey	
2023	Na Umra Ki Seema Ho	Jay Shah	
2024	Main Hoon Saath Tere	Suyash	
2025	Gatha Shiv Parivaar Ki — Ganesh Kartikey	Devraj Indra	
