= Vinay Rohrra =

Indian television actor (born 1986)

- Born: 15 March 1986 (age 40); Mumbai, Maharashtra, India
- Occupation: Actor
- Years active: 2008 – present
- Spouse: Pooja Dhanwani (m. 2012)
- Children: 1

Vinay Rohrra (born 15 March 1986) is an Indian television actor.

He is known for playing the lead role of Ranbir in the television show Ranbir Rano on Zee TV and the male lead role of Sharad on Badi Door Se Aaye Hai. Most recently, he has played Madhav Solanki in Kaatelal & Sons.

== Career ==
Rohrra made his television debut with Ranbir Rano as Ranbir. After that, he played the role of Bajirao in Laagi Tujhse Lagan and Vinod in Shubh Vivah. He also played an episodic role of Neel in the anthology series Teri Meri Love Stories on Star Plus. He was last seen in Life OK's show Dil Se Di Dua... Saubhagyavati Bhava? as Raj. He later played the lead role of Sharad Ghotala in Badi Door Se Aaye Hai on SAB TV. Recently, he played the role of Madhav Solanki in the show Kaatelal & Sons.

== Personal life ==
Vinay married his longtime girlfriend, Pooja Dhanwani, in February 2012 in Mumbai. The couple became parents to a baby girl on 8 January 2021. Rohrra announced the arrival of his daughter on instagram.

== Television ==
Year	Serial	Role	Channel
2008	Ranbir Rano	Ranbir	Zee TV
2009–2012	Laagi Tujhse Lagan	Bajirao	Colors TV
2012	Shubh Vivah	Vinod	Sony Entertainment Television
2012	Teri Meri Love Stories	Neil (Episode 9)	Star Plus
2012–2013	Dil Se Di Dua... Saubhagyavati Bhava?	Raj	Life OK
2013	Yeh Hai Aashiqui	Ankur	Bindass
2014–2016	Badi Door Se Aaye Hain	Sharad Ghotala	Sony SAB
2018	Partners Trouble Ho Gayi Double	Avinash Sehgal	Sony SAB
2020	Tenali Rama	Abdullah	Sony SAB
2021	Kaatelal & Sons	Madhav Solanki	Sony SAB
2022–2023	Katha Ankahee	Aditya Garewal	Sony Entertainment Television
2024	Wagle Ki Duniya – Nayi Peedhi Naye Kissey	Karan Thapar	Sony SAB
2026	Taara	Jagdish Shekhawat	Star Plus
2026–present	Dil Ki Bewafaiyaan		Star Plus
