= Zor Lagaa Ke... Haiya! =

2009 film

- Directed by: Girish Girija Joshi
- Written by: Girish Girija Joshi
- Produced by: Kartikeya Talreja; Basant Talreja
- Starring: Meghan Jadhav; Mithun Chakraborty; Mahesh Manjrekar; Seema Biswas; Gulshan Grover; Sachin Khedekar; Riya Sen; Raj Zutshi; Ritwik Tyagi; Ayesha Kaduskar
- Narrated by: Amitabh Bachchan
- Cinematography: Hari Nair
- Edited by: V N Mayekar
- Music by: Bapi, Tutul
- Distributed by: Gemini Pictures
- Release date: 12 June 2009
- Country: India
- Language: Hindi

Zor Lagaa Ke... Haiya! is a 2009 Indian children's film starring Meghan Jadhav, Mithun Chakraborty and Mahesh Manjrekar. It has a pro-forest and anti-construction environmental message. Amitabh Bachchan is the narrator.

== Plot ==
A group of children with the help of a beggar try to save some trees from a construction company intent on cutting them down to make way for new buildings.

== Cast ==
- Meghan Jadhav as Rohan
- Mithun Chakraborty as Raavan
- Mahesh Manjrekar as Gupta
- Seema Biswas as Ram's mother
- Gulshan Grover as Bakshi
- Sachin Khedekar as Vivek (Karan's father)
- Anita Date-Kelkar
- Hardik Thakkar as Laddu
- Riya Sen as Chamki
- Raj Zutshi as Asthana
- Ashwin Chitale as Ram

== Music ==
1. "Ehsaas Bejaan Hai" – Shaan
2. "Hari Bhari Duniya" (Instrumental)
3. "Hawa Hawa" (Instrumental)
4. "Koi Aaye Koi Jaye" – Armaan Malik, Nilesh Singh, Tanmay Chaudhary
5. "Mairi Mairi" – Roop Kumar Rathod
6. "Pawan" (Instrumental)
7. "Satrangi Sapno Ki" – Armaan Malik, Tanmay Chaudhary
8. "Zor Lagaa Ke Haiya" – Kunal Ganjawala, Shweta Pandit
9. "Zor Lagaa Ke Haiya" (Remix) – Kunal Ganjawala, Shweta Pandit

== Reception ==
Zor Lagaa Ke...Haiya! received positive reviews and won four film festival awards.
