= Jahangirabad Media Institute =

Media institute in India

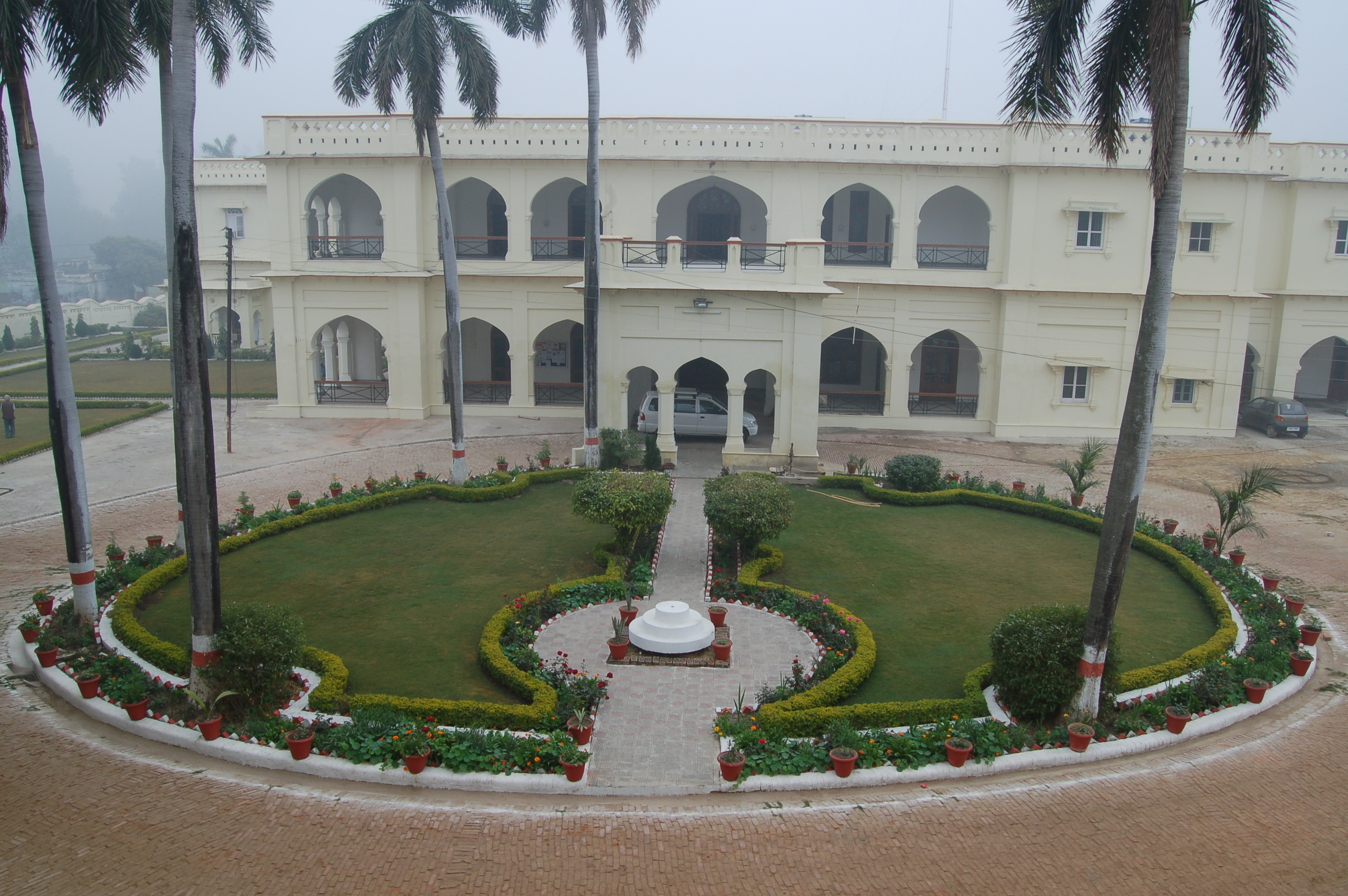
- Motto: Enter into ever expanding cosmos of mass media
- Type: Education, Institution, Media
- Established: 2005
- Location: Barabanki, Uttar Pradesh, India
- Campus: Rural
- Website: www.jmi.edu.in

Jahangirabad Media Institute (JMI) is a media institute in India. It was established by the Jahangirabad Education Trust in 2005 and is situated in a pictorial palace of Jahangirabad in Barabanki District in Uttar Pradesh state. It mainly runs courses in electronic media.

It organised two editions of National Student Video Film Festivals at its campus. JMI organized the National Science Film Festival and Competition at Chennai on 4–7 January 2011. It also published a research report on the socio-economic conditions of Muslims in India in collaboration with the Indian Social Institute, New Delhi and ActionAid-India.

It has produced many documentaries and news programmes on socially relevant subjects. The short science films "Refraction" and "Friction My Friend" produced by JMI students were short listed for the Rashtriya Vigyan Chalachitra Mela and Competition 2012.
