= School Friends (TV series) =

Indian romance comedy television series

- Promotional poster
- Genre: Romance comedy
- Developed by: Alka Shukla, Apeksha Galundia, Siddharth Saini
- Screenplay by: Apeksha Galundia
- Directed by: Sahil Verma
- Starring: Navika Kotia; Aaditya Gupta; Manav Soneji; Alisha Parveen; Ansh Pandey; Ashnoor Kaur
- Country of origin: India
- Original language: Hindi
- No. of seasons: 3
- No. of episodes: 57

Production
- Cinematography: Chirayush Bhanushali
- Editors: Shaikh Pervez; Waseem Ali
- Camera setup: Multi-camera
- Running time: 30 minutes
- Production company: Rusk Studios

Original release
- Network: Amazon Prime Video
- Release: 23 August 2023 – 21 January 2025

School Friends is an Indian Hindi-language romance comedy television series produced by Rusk Studios. The series features Navika Kotia, Aaditya Gupta, Manav Soneji, Alisha Parveen and Ansh Pandey. It premiered on Amazon Prime Video, formerly known as Amazon miniTV on 23 August 2023.

== Cast ==
- Navika Kotia as Stuti Sharma
- Aaditya Gupta as Anirban "Ban/Ani" Gupta
- Manav Soneji as Raman Agrawal
- Alisha Parveen as Dimple Chaddha
- Ansh Pandey as Mukund Sahu
- Ashnoor Kaur as Yashika Malhotra
- Priya Trivedi as Kudrat "Kaddu"
- Prakash Bhardwaj as Principal Ritam "Chola" Bhola
- Harsh Gandhi as Gaurav Bhola

== Production ==
The series was announced by Rusk Studios for Amazon miniTV. Navika Kotia, Aaditya Gupta, Manav Soneji, Alisha Parveen and Ansh Pandey were signed as the lead.

== Reception ==
Archika Khurana from The Times of India rated the series 3/5 stars.
