= Aashish Kaul =

Indian television actor

- Born: Srinagar, Kashmir, India
- Occupation: Actor
- Years active: 1995–present

Aashish Kaul is an Indian television actor. He has been associated with the Indian film and television industry since 1995. He is known for a wide variety of roles in popular Hindi television shows including Ghutan, Kkusum, Kahaani Ghar Ghar Kii, Kasautii Zindagii Kay, C.I.D., Kumkum – Ek Pyara Sa Bandhan, Ssshhhh...Koi Hai, Barrister Babu and Naagin 7. He played the protagonist, Banne Khan, in Afsana Dilwalon Ka, a 2001 Bollywood film directed by J. Om Prakash.

== Television ==
Year	Serial	Role	Notes
1995	Mano Ya Na Mano	Amit	Episodes 46–50
1996–1998	Yug		
1998	Saturday Suspense	Amit Saxena	Episode 85 – "Raktarekha"
2001	Ssshhhh...Koi Hai	Devan	Episode 3 – "Bhediya"
2001–2002	Dollar Bahu	Rahul	Rini's husband, RK & Lakshmi's son-in-law
2001–2005	Kkusum	Aryaman Oberoi	
2002	Kohi Apna Sa	Sameer	
2002–2003	Kitne Kool Hai Hum		
2002–2004	Kahaani Ghar Ghar Kii	Rohan Garg	
2003–2005	Kayaamat – Jabb Bhi Waqt Aata Hai	Devan Ahuja	
2005	Raat Hone Ko Hai	Deven	Episodes 149–152 – "Qaid" parts 1–4
2005	Raat Hone Ko Hai	Vicky	Episodes 265–268 – "Khopdi" parts 1–4
2005	Rooh		Episode 19
2005	Des Mein Niklla Hoga Chand	Arjun Deshmukh	Cameo role
2005–2006	Phir Bhi Dil Hai Hindustani	Jagdish	
2005–2006	Kasautii Zindagii Kay	Subroto Basu	
2005–2016	C.I.D.	Kaushal Gharendra	Episodes 85, 86 and 88 – "Punarjanam" parts 1, 2 and 4
2005–2016	C.I.D.	Prateek	Episode 420 – "Body In The Suitcase"
2005–2016	C.I.D.	Parthav	Episode 426 – "The Case of Mysterious Gift"
2005–2016	C.I.D.	Manik	Episode 467 – "The Great Diamond Robbery"
2005–2016	C.I.D.	Pramod	Episode 476 – "Room With a View"
2005–2016	C.I.D.	Mehul Kumar	Episode 495 – "The Mysterious Body Farm"
2005–2016	C.I.D.	Manoj / Kailash	Episode 456 – "Murder of the Killer"
2005–2016	C.I.D.	Dev	Episode 857 – "Raaz 14 Saal Ke Qaidi Ka"
2005–2016	C.I.D.	Tushar Rajeshwar	Episode 925 – "Jaadui Box"
2005–2016	C.I.D.	Saurav	Episode 996 – "Aankho Ki Anhoni"
2005–2016	C.I.D.	Dr. Vikas	Episode 1285 – "Dahlia Road"
2006	Piya Ka Ghar	Munna	
2006	K. Street Pali Hill	Advocate Satlani	Cameo role
2006	Kaisa Ye Pyar Hai	Advocate Verma	Cameo role
2006	Viraasat	Professor Vardhan	Cameo role
2007	Vicky & Vetaal	Shekhar bajaj	Episodic role
2007–2008	Rakhi – Atoot Rishtey Ki Dor	Sujeet	
2008	Kumkum – Ek Pyara Sa Bandhan	Shatru Mishra	
2011	Ek Nayi Chhoti Si Zindagi	Manoj	
2012	Haunted Nights	Advocate Vinod Sinha	Episodes 141–145 – "Faisla" Part 1 – Part 5
2012	Parvarrish – Kuchh Khattee Kuchh Meethi	Bharat Sharma	Cameo role
2013–2014	Har Yug Mein Aayega Ek – Arjun	Home Minister Mangesh Joshi	Episode 16
2013–2014	Har Yug Mein Aayega Ek – Arjun	Dr. Hariharan	Episode 119
2013	Haunted Nights	Mukesh	Episodes 381–385 – "Aghortantra" Part 1–5
2013–2017	Savdhaan India	Mani Bhushan	Episode 450
2013–2017	Savdhaan India	Ramen Sharma	Episode 522
2013–2017	Savdhaan India	Advocate Vinay Salaskar	Episode 616
2013–2017	Savdhaan India	Varun Khanna	Episode 789
2013–2017	Savdhaan India	Abhinav	Episode 841
2013–2017	Savdhaan India	Aashish	Episode 1422
2013–2017	Savdhaan India	Amit	Episode 1694
2013–2017	Savdhaan India	Aashish	Episode 1742
2013–2017	Savdhaan India	Lakshman Singh Shekhawat	Episode 1890
2013–2017	Savdhaan India	Mr. Gupta	Episode 1983
2014	Adaalat	Public Prosecutor Rajveer Rathore	Episodes 322 and 323 – "Shrapit Khanzar" Part 1 and 2
2014	Adaalat	Public Prosecutor Rajveer Rathore	Episode 354 – "Gawah Ya Khooni"
2014; 2015	Qubool Hai	Nawab Raza Ibrahim	Cameo role
2014–2015	Pyaar Tune Kya Kiya	Rohan's Father	Episode 13
2014–2015	Pyaar Tune Kya Kiya	Mahir's Father	Season 6, episode 7
2015	Dil Ki Baatein Dil Hi Jaane	Suraj Mehra	
2015	Tashan-E-Ishq	Dr. Akshay Luthra	Episode 51
2016	Agent Raghav – Crime Branch	Mr. Joshi	Episode 39
2016	Ishqbaaaz	Mr. Chhabra	Cameo role, episodes 99–101
2016; 2017	Khwaabon Ki Zamin Par		Cameo role
2017	Savitri Devi College & Hospital	Sujeet Chawla	
2017–2018	Rishta Likhenge Hum Naya	Raghavendra "Raghu" Singh	
2019	Shrimad Bhagwat Mahapuran	Prahlad	
2019–2020	Bepannah Pyaar	Devraj Malhotra	
2020	Barrister Babu	Shivraj Bhaumik	Negative Role
2020	Pavitra Bhagya	Vishambhar Gehlot	Supporting role
2020	Shaadi Mubarak	Mr. Nathmal	Supporting role
2020–2021	Tera Yaar Hoon Main	Zonal Head	Supporting role
2020–2021	Brahmarakshas	Shakti Mehra	Supporting role
2021	Lakshmi Ghar Aayi	Arun Tiwari	Supporting role
2021	Kyun Utthe Dil Chhod Aaye	Karamchand Raizada	Supporting role
2021	Ziddi Dil Maane Na	Bodhraj Ganju	Supporting role
2022	Fanaa: Ishq Mein Marjawan	Vibhushan Tandon	
2022	Sasural Simar Ka 2	Gautam Kapoor	
2022	Channa Mereya	Anand Singh	
2022	Cyber Vaar – Har Screen Crime Scene – Hospital Ransomeware: Part 1 & Part 2	Episode 7 & Episode 8	
2022	Control Room		Cameo
2022–2024	Kismat Ki Lakiro Se	Anuj Tripathi	
2023	Dhruv Tara – Samay Sadi Se Pare	Mr. Malhotra	
2023	Kundali Bhagya	Dr. Avinash	
2025	Bade Achhe Lagte Hain 4	Gautam Kapoor	
2025–2026	Naagin 7	Parmeet Suri	Antagonist
2026	Kyunki Saas Bhi Kabhi Bahu Thi 2	Subhash Dasgupta	Cameo Role

== Film ==
Year	Film	Role
1995	Param Vir Chakra	
2016	Sanam Re	Akash's Father
