= Badii Devrani =

Indian television series

- Genre: Drama
- Created by: Sumeet Hukamchand Mittal; Shashi Mittal
- Starring: Mudit Nayar; Daya Shankar Pandey; Megha Chakraborty
- Country of origin: India
- Original language: Hindi
- No. of seasons: 1
- No. of episodes: 165

Production
- Producers: Shashi Mittal; Sumeet Hukamchand Mittal
- Running time: 24 minutes
- Production company: Shashi Sumeet Productions

Original release
- Network: &TV
- Release: 30 March – 13 November 2015

Badii Devrani is an Indian television show that aired on &TV from 30 March 2015 to 13 November 2015. It was the story of an unusual union between an older woman, Reeti, and a younger man, Vibhor, even though their families are bitter enemies.

== Plot ==
For business reasons, Reeti is promised to Vibhor, five years her junior and the youngest of the Poddar sons. Reeti, who is well-educated, projects a progressive mindset towards life. The show engages the viewer in the question of whether or not Reeti will be able to strike a balance and secure a place for herself in the Poddar family, and in Vibhor's heart, given the uneasy circumstances under which they get married. The setting of the story is a traditional Marwari family, with most of the themes presenting fundamental relationships and togetherness.

On a business trip, the Poddar men, including Vibhor, get into a fatal accident and die leaving their wives to mourn their deaths.

The politically powerful Kadambari Mehta vows to destroy the Poddar family and succeeds. She tricks Reeti into marrying her son Moksh Mehta who is mentally challenged. Reeti is mistreated by the Mehtas but strikes a friendly relationship with Moksh. She discovers hidden secrets in the Mehta family and exposes Moksh's sister, Siddhi, as the culprit. It is revealed that Siddhi was siphoning off funds from a family-run NGO and when her father threatened to report her to the police, she killed him and buried his body. However, this is witnessed by Moksh who then has an accident and loses his memory. Siddhi starts giving Moksh the wrong medicines so he would remain mentally challenged. Though at first Reeti thinks Kadambari may have killed her husband, she eventually exposes Siddhi who is sent to prison. Kadambari apologizes for her past actions and accepts Reeti as her daughter-in-law.

Under the right care, Moksh slowly recovers and starts going to the office as he and his family live happily.

== Cast ==
- Mudit Nayar as Vibhor, Reeti's husband and the youngest Poddar son
- Megha Chakraborty as Reeti
- Sudhir Dalvi as Dadaji / Hanuman Poddar, patriarch of the Poddar family, Vibhor's grandfather
- Vanya Joshi as Dadiji, Vibhor's grandmother
- Reena Kapoor as Prabha Poddar, Vibhor's mother
- Roshani Shetty as Manbhari, Prabha's sister and Vibhor's biological mother
- Kajol Srivastav as Megha, Prabha's daughter
- Raju Shrestha as Swaroop Chand, Manbhari's husband
- Daya Shankar Pandey as Bilasi Poddar, Vibhor's uncle
- Jyoti Gauba as Kaushalaya Poddar, Bilasi's wife
- Ankit Vyas as Nikunj Poddar, Bilasi's son
- Priyanka Singh as Kajal Poddar, Nikunj's wife
- Shubhi Ahuja as Manisha Poddar
- Chetan Pandit as Sitaram Biyani, Reeti's father
- Navni Parihar as Indira Biyani, Reeti's mother
- Ekroop Bedi as Reeti's younger sister
- Aamir Dalvi as Moksh Mehta, Reeti's second husband
- Alok Narula as Rohan Mehta, Moksh's brother
- Anjali Abrol as Siddhi Mehta, Moksh's sister
- Kamalika Guha Thakurta as Moksh’s Mother
