= Thodasa Badal Thodasa Paani =

Indian soap opera

- Genre: Drama Series
- Written by: Leena Gangopadhyay
- Screenplay by: Pavni mehandiratta Ritu Goel; Rachel Navare
- Directed by: Rohit Dwivedi
- Creative director: Pritish Das
- Starring: See below
- Country of origin: India
- Original language: Hindi
- No. of seasons: 1
- No. of episodes: 134

Production
- Producers: Vipul D Shah; Arko Ganguli
- Production locations: Karnataka; Mumbai
- Editors: Sampriti Chakraborty; Shashank Harendra Singh
- Camera setup: Multi-camera
- Running time: 16-20 minutes
- Production companies: Optimystix Entertainment and Organics Production

Original release
- Network: Colors TV
- Release: 23 August 2021 – 4 March 2022

Thoda Sa Baadal Thoda Sa Paani (transl. Just A Little Cloud, Just A Little Water) is an Indian Hindi-language drama series that airs on Colors TV. It premiered on 23 August 2021 and ended on 4 March 2022. It stars Ishita Dutta, Karan Suchak and Harshad Arora. The series is loosely based on the movie Ek Vivaah... Aisa Bhi. It was remade in Bengali as Sona Roder Gaan.

== Plot ==
It is the story of a sweet simple Bengali girl Kajol Mukherjee who is the eldest of all her siblings. She is very intelligent and very mature. She always keeps her family first and never wishes for anything for herself. She has three more younger sisters - Naina, Anu and Chandrika and one younger brother Apu. Her younger sister Naina is always jealous of her but her other siblings love and respect her. The story begins with the modest and cheerful Mukherjee family preparing to celebrate the birthday of their eldest daughter, Kajol, and celebrate the marriage proposal by Arjun Chatterjee, a wealthy businessman. When family members began to miss Kajol while making the preparations, Kajol also began to worry about her family's condition after her absence. Arjun is a young man, handsome and good- looking. One day, Kajol receives a call from a woman, who tells her that Arjun is actually a playboy who has played with the feelings of many women. After receiving such a call, Kajol began to worry, but eventually she forgot about it and thought the call was just a fake. Later, it was revealed that the person who called Kajol was Arjun's sister-in-law, Shreya, who is having an affair with Arjun and is hell bent on breaking their relationship. Kajol is quite upset knowing Arjun's family demanded a luxury car from her father. Now adding more to this tension, Arjun overreacts when Kajol requests him to stop his family and convince them to take back the demand. Arjun and Kajol's this major clash takes an ugly u-turn when Arjun disgraces Kajol. Kajol tells her father if that car goes to Arjun's home, then she won't. Shreya tells family that Kajol called Arjun to discuss something important. She says that Kajol's family won't give the car. Arjun's father calls Kajol's father and says that he didn't know they are doing Arjun's relationship in a beggar and betrayer's family. Kajol's father is hurt. Kajol's father gets loan money, but when he's going back home, he gets robbed. A man stops his car and chases the thieves but is unsuccessful. Kajol gets a call and she learns about her father's accident. She rushes to the hospital. The guy (who brought Vishu to hospital) checks Vishu in the hospital and tells him that he is Dr. Anurag Basu and this is his hospital. Kajol thanks him and goes. The next day Kajol and her siblings attend Kajol's Pre wedding party where Kajol gets to know that Anurag is Arjun's cousin. Shreya makes her drink alcohol to humiliate her however later gets exposed by Bulti but Anandita and Kaushik, Arjun's parents who already had a disliking for Kajol refuse to believe her. After some time, Vishnu gives Arjun a car by mortgaging his factory but keeps it a secret from kajol and the rest of the family. At the day of marriage, Naina gets to know that Vishu bought a car for Arjun and Vishu dies and Naina blame Kajol. Rajesh (her father's assistant at business) and Anurag tells Kajol the truth and she breaks her engagement with Arjun and exposes his relationship with Shreya. Kajol's mother Chandana starts blaming her for everything and calls her unlucky.

A heartbroken and shattered Kajol then decides to become the breadwinner of the family to pay off the debts by handling her father's Press business. At first, she faces a lot of problems and Anurag help her by giving money through Rajesh and also uses his contacts to catch the thief who stole her father's money. Anurag helps her with orders through his late mother Anjali's NGO. He also gets to know that Kajol was his mother's favourite student. They slowly begin to get close to each other after many misunderstandings. Kajol plans to sell the car Vishu brought for her wedding however Chandana manipulated by Naina refuses you let her do so. Pishi ma scold Chandana and Naina for their behaviour towards Kajol.

Meanwhile Arjun decides to avenge his humiliation by marrying Naina and Naina also decides to marry him despite kajol's warning. Chandana supports Naina and behaves rudely with Kajol.

One day, Kajol doesn't come home and the Mukherjee family and Anurag gets tensed and calls Rajesh but realises that she didn't came to office that day. Anurag gets to know through news that a woman met with an accident on the place where Kajol commutes every day. He complains in the police whereas at home Rajesh gets a call from a hospital where Mukherjees are called to identify the body. Apu, Arjun, Naina and Anurag goes there and since the girl's face was completely destroyed due to the accident they are only able to recognise Kajol's watch on her hand. But Anurag doesn't believe that she is Kajol and gets a call from his hospital where Kajol is admitted because she fainted due to not eating properly. Anurag dropped her at home where the family is mourning her death and everyone gets happy on seeing her. The next day, Kajol and Anurag have a great time with the kids of the NGO when Kajol when there for meeting. During evening Kajol and Anurag on their way to return home are attacked by goons where Anurag gets injured while saving her and media spreads fake news about them having an affair. Naina makes full use of this to humiliate her and Chandana slaps Kajol due to which Kajol vows never to meet Anurag again.

Anurag is called by Kajol's Pishi ma at Vishvanath's final rites where he sees how Chandana behaves with Kajol and is not allowing her to be a part of final rites of her father. Chandana orders Kajol to apologize to Chatterjee family in front of everyone.

After many misunderstandings, Anurag finally proposes Kajol and she accepts it but Priyanka, Anurag's best friend who secretly loves him tries to break their relationship with the help of his(Anurag) grandmother who hates Kajol and wants her to stay away from her grandson.

On Naina and Arjun's wedding day, a big amount of money gets stolen at Mukherjee house and later it is revealed that Naina stole it. Arjun and his family leave without Naina. Chandana realises her mistake of blaming everything on Kajol and slaps Naina. The misunderstanding between Anurag and Kajol get sorted after a confrontation and Anurag warns Priyanka to stay out of their personal matter.

However, Priyanka threatens him that she will charge Kajol on attempt to murder if he refuses to which he agrees. Meanwhile, Arjun's younger sister Amrita "Bulti" loves Kajol's brother Randeep aka Opu and Bulti's family oppose this so they take help of Kajol and Anurag to get married due to which Bulti is disowned by her parents.

Anurag's aunt explains him that if he and Kajol are meant to be together then they will. Anurag and Priyanka's wedding rituals commence and on haldi ceremony Anurag gifts Kajol a necklace which his mother wanted to give her daughter in law but Naina and Priyanka notices the expensive necklace and insults her to which she leaves and vows never to meet Anurag again.

The next day, Anurag tries to call Kajol to console her and apologize but she doesn't pick up his call. He tries to divert his mind on work and ignores Priyanka's calls. Later in evening, he met with an accident and calls Kajol and confesses his feelings for her and tells her about accident. Kajol rushes and takes him to hospital where he doctor says that he might not be able to walk again. On learning this, Priyanka breaks her marriage with Anurag. After gaining consciousness, Anurag is shocked to know that his legs are unwell and Kajol calms him down. He loses his self-confidence and thinks Kajol is helping him out of sympathy. He behaves rudely with her and tells her to leave him and marry someone else. But Kajol makes a plan with Anurag's father Abhishek and the director of the hospital to help Anurag gain back his confidence. She somehow brings him to the hospital and an emergency case arrives for which Anurag is called and not only does he do the operation successfully but also was able to stand on his feet due to a miracle. He gets to know that Kajol planned all this and apologizes for his rude behavior and requests her to support him in his physiotherapy.

With Kajol's help, he finally gets well and is felicitated by the hospital director where he gives credit to Kajol as Priyanka watches and plans to ruin their relationship. He arranges a party announcing his engagement with Kajol and his grandmother also happily accepts her. After lots of problems created afterwards by Naina, Priyanka, Arjun and his parents, they finally get married. Naina again tries to take control of their press business by lying but this time Kajol does not fall in her trap and warns her against trying to break the family. The show ends on a happy note with Kajol and Anurag seeking blessings from their families for a happy married life.

== Cast ==
=== Main ===
- Ishita Dutta as Kajol Basu (nee: Mukherjee): Vishwanath and Chandana's eldest daughter; Naina, Randeep, Chandrika and Anu's sister; Arjun's ex-fiancée; Anurag's wife (2021–2022)
- Karan Suchak as Dr. Anurag Basu: Anjali and Abhishek's son; Sharmila's nephew; Amrita, Ayan and Arjun's cousin; Kajol's husband (2021–2022)
- Harshad Arora as Arjun Chatterjee: Anandita and Kaushik's son; Anurag’s cousin; Ayan and Amrita's brother; Kajol's ex-fiancé; Naina's husband; Shreya's lover (2021–2022)

=== Recurring ===
- Patrali Chattopadhyay as Shreya Chatterjee: Ayan's wife; Arjun's lover (2021–2022)
- Sneha Raikar as Chandana Mukherjee: Vishwanath's wife; Kajol, Naina, Chandrika, Randeep and Anu's mother (2021–2022)
- Jasmine Avasia as Naina Mukherjee Chatterjee: Vishwanath and Chandana's second daughter; Kajol, Randeep, Chandrika and Anu's sister; Arjun's wife (2021–2022)
- Vaibhavi Mahajan as Chandrika Mukherjee: Vishwanath and Chandana's third daughter; Kajol, Randeep, Naina and Anu’s sister (2021–2022)
- Meghan Jadhav as Randeep "Opu" Mukherjee: Vishwanath and Chandana's son; Kajol, Naina, Anu and Chandrika's brother; Amrita's husband (2021–2022)
- Ravi Mahashabde as Vishwanath Mukherjee: Thakurji and Shyam's brother; Chandana's husband; Kajol, Anu, Randeep, Chandrika and Naina's father (2021) (Dead)
- Neha Harsora as Annika "Anu" Mukherjee: Vishwanath and Chandana's youngest daughter; Kajol, Naina, Randeep and Chandrika's sister (2021–2022)
- Swaroopa Ghosh as Pishti Mukherjee "Thakurji": Shyam and Vishwanath's elder sister; Kajol, Naina, Randeep, Chandrika and Anu's paternal aunt (2021–2022)
- Deepak Daryani as Shyam Mukherjee: Vishwanath and Thakurji's brother; Lekha's husband; Kajol, Naina, Randeep, Chandrika and Anu's uncle (2021–2022)
- Shweta Rastogi as Lekha Mukherjee: Shyam's wife; Kajol, Naina, Randeep, Chandrika and Anu's aunt (2021–2022)
- Vijay Tilani as Ayan Chatterjee: Anandita and Kaushik's eldest son; Arjun and Amrita's elder brother; Shreya's husband; Anurag's cousin (2021–2022)
- Bhakti Rathod as Anandita Chatterjee: Kaushik's wife; Arjun, Ayan and Amrita's mother (2021–2022)
- Muni Jha as Kaushik Chatterjee: Pramod's brother; Anandita's husband; Arjun, Ayan and Amrita's father; Abhishek and Sharmila's cousin (2021–2022)
- Madhuri Sanjeev as Aradhana Chatterjee: Pramod's wife; Arjun, Ayan and Amrita's aunt (2021–2022)
- Salina Randhawa as Amrita "Bulti" Chatterjee Mukherjee: Kaushik and Anandita's daughter; Ayan and Arjun's sister; Anurag's cousin; Randeep's wife (2021–2022)
- Jeetendra Trehan as Dr. Abhishek Basu: Anjali's husband; Anurag's father; Sharmila's brother; Kaushik's cousin (2021–2022)
- Preeti Gandwani as Anjali Basu (dead): Abhishek's wife; Anurag's mother (2021–2022)
- Sejal Shah as Sharmila Basu: Abhishek's sister; Anurag's aunt; Kaushik's cousin (2021–2022)
- Arsh Merchant as Rajesh: a man who works with Vishwanath and later Kajol in their printing press (2021–2022)
- Preeti Chaudhary as Dr. Priyanka Sen: Anurag's former friend and ex-fiancée (2021–2022)

== Production ==
=== Casting ===
Ishita Dutta was roped in as the female lead as Kajol Mukherjee. Mishkat Varma joined the cast as Rahul; however, he quit. Karan Suchak replaced him with other characters as Dr. Anurag Basu. Harshad Arora was roped in the series as Arjun Chatterjee, a negative role.

== Adaptations ==
Language	Title	Original Release	Network(s)	Last aired	Notes
Hindi	Thodasa Baadal Thodasa Paani थोडासा बादल थोडासा पानी	23 August 2021	Colors TV	4 March 2022	Original
Bengali	Sona Roder Gaan সোনা রোদের গান	24 January 2022	Colors Bangla	27 November 2022	Remake
