= Navika Kotia =

Indian television actress

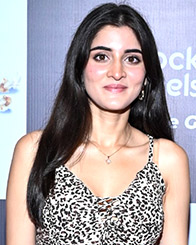
- Kotia in 2025
- Born: Mumbai, Maharashtra, India
- Education: Ryan International School, Mumbai
- Occupation: Actress
- Years active: 2007–present
- Known for: English Vinglish; Yeh Rishta Kya Kehlata Hai
- Partner: Mazen Mody (2025–2026)
- Relatives: Shivansh Kotia (brother)

Navika Kotia is an Indian actress who appears in Hindi films and television. She is popularly known for playing dual roles in Star Plus's Yeh Rishta Kya Kehlata Hai as Prerna Singhania and Maya Khera. She has also appeared in an Indian Hindi film English Vinglish as Sridevi's on-screen daughter with her younger brother Shivansh Kotia.

== Personal life ==
After a brief dating for a year in an arranged match set-up, Kotia got engaged to entrepreneur Mazen Mody, in an intimate ceremony on 24 January 2026 but the duo called off their engagement in later months of same year facing compatibility issues.

== Filmography ==
=== Films ===
Year	Title	Role	Language	Ref.
2007	Bhool Bhulaiyaa	Child Avni	Hindi	
2012	English Vinglish	Sapna Godbole	Hindi	
2013	Attarintiki Daredi	Sasi's younger sister	Telugu	
2014	Murugaatrupadai	Meenakshi	Tamil	
2014	Chinnadana Nee Kosam	Nithin's younger sister	Telugu	

=== Television ===
Year	Title	Role	Notes	Ref.
2007–2008	Kasamh Se	Vidya Bali	Child artist	
2008	Baa Bahoo Aur Baby	Lucky Thakkar	Child artist	
2009	Saat Phere – Saloni Ka Safar	Kamini Singh	Child artist	
2010	Balika Vadhu	Teepri's daughter	Child artist	
2010–2012	Maryada: Lekin Kab Tak?	Tara Raheja	Child artist	
2013	Yeh Rishta Kya Kehlata Hai	Prerna "Chikki" Singhania	Child artist	
2022	Yeh Rishta Kya Kehlata Hai	Maya "Mau" Khera		
2023–2024	Kyunki... Saas Maa Bahu Beti Hoti Hai	Kesar Suraj Rajgaur		

=== Web Series ===
Year	Title	Role	Notes	Ref.
2023–2025	School Friends	Stuti Sharma	3 seasons	

=== Music videos ===
Year	Title	Singer(s)	Ref.
2022	Roye Roye	Madhur Sharma	
2023	Apni Saanson Mein	Abhi Dutt	
