= Manav Soneji =

Indian actor

- Born: 2 October; Mumbai, Maharashtra
- Occupation: Actor
- Years active: 2015–present

Manav Soneji is an Indian actor. Nominated for Best Comedy Actor by Filmfare OTT, Nominated for Best Actor by ITA (Indian Television Academy), He is known for playing character as Raman in School Friends (TV series), as Jaman in Anandibaa Aur Emily, as Phitkari in Kaatelal & Sons, as Ali in Mere Sai and as Vicky in Gujarat 11.

== Career ==
Soneji made his debut in 2015 with the TV serial Palak Pe Jhalak . In 2017 he acted as Hansal Sahu in Web-series Lakhon Mein Ek. In 2019 Soneji played as Ali in TV Series Mere Sai and as Vicky in Film Gujarat 11. In 2020 he acted as Phitkari in Kaatelal & Sons. He played as Patkan in TV mini series Dil-E-Couch in 2021. In 2022, Soneji acted as Jaman in Anandibaa Aur Emily.

== Filmography ==
Year	Movie/TV Series	Character	Notes
2015	Palak Pe Jhalak		
2017	Lakhon Mein Ek	Hansal Sahu	
2019	Mere Sai	Ali	
2019	Gujarat 11	Vicky	
2020–2021	Kaatelal & Sons	Phitkari	
2021	Dil-E-Couch	Patkan	
2022–2023	Anandibaa Aur Emily	Jaman Patel	
2023	Crime Aajkal	Chimnay	
2023–2025	School Friends	Raman	
