= Sona Roder Gaan =

2022 Indian television series

- Genre: Family; Romance
- Developed by: Magic Moments Motion Pictures
- Written by: Leena Gangopadhyay
- Story by: Leena Gangopadhyay
- Starring: Payel De; Rishi Kaushik; Shoumo Banerjee
- Theme music composer: Debjit Roy
- Opening theme: Sona Roder Gaan by Anweshaa
- Country of origin: India
- Original language: Bengali
- No. of episodes: 306

Production
- Production location: Kolkata
- Camera setup: Multi-camera
- Running time: 22 minutes

Original release
- Network: Colors Bangla
- Release: 24 January – 27 November 2022

Sona Roder Gaan is a Bengali daily soap which aired on Colors Bangla from 24 January 2022. It stars Payel De and Rishi Kaushik. It is the remake of Colors TV's Thodasa Badal Thodasa Paani.

== Plot ==
Anandi is a responsible girl who lives in a joint family with her parents and other family members. She is set to marry her love interest Bikram. Bikram's family demand dowry from Anandi's father Bishwanath. Biswanath takes a loan to pay dowry and when Anandi discovers this, she refuses to marry. Later, on Biswanath's persuasion, she agrees to the marriage. Meanwhile, Anandi meets Dr. Anubhab, who is Bikram's cousin and also Biswanath's doctor. Anubhab helps Anandi every time. Anandi suspects that Bikram is having an affair with his sister-in-law Shreya.

Biswanath dies on the wedding day due to stress and Anandi breaks her marriage with Bikram. Anandi's mother and sister blame Anandi for Biswanath's death. To help her family and to pay off debt, Anandi starts work. Meanwhile, Anubhav falls in love with Anandi. Bikram lures Nanda into his fake love to take revenge on Anandi. Nanda marries Bikram despite Anandi's warning. Shreya starts creating trouble for Nanda. Meanwhile, Anubhab's friend Diya, who is in love with Anubhab, gets jealous of Anandi. Diya creates misunderstanding in Anandi and Anubhav's relationship but it eventually improves anyway.

Meanwhile, Anandi's brother Apu falls in love with Bikram's sister, Bulti, but no one agrees to their relationship, but Anandi gets them married. Anubhab meets with an accident and becomes disabled, Anandi helps him.

== Cast ==
=== Main ===
- Payel De as Anandi Mukherjee – Rudrani, Chandrani and Nandini's elder sister, Anubhab's love interest, Vikram's ex-fiancée
- Rishi Kaushik as Dr. Anubhab Maitra – Anandi's love interest, Diya's obsession
- Shoumo Banerjee as Vikram Chatterjee – Anandi's ex-boyfriend, Shreya's lover, Nanda's husband

=== Recurring ===
- Sohini Sengupta as Chandana Mukherjee – Anandi, Nanda, Chandra and Jhilik's mother
- Bhaskar Banerjee as Bishwanath Mukherjee – Anandi, Nanda, Chandra and Jhilik's father
- Tanushree Goswami as Rajeswari Chatterjee - Vikram's mother
- Anindo Sarkar as Vikram's father
- Riya Roy / Nishantika Das as Chandrani Mukherjee aka Chandra– Anandi's younger sister
- Srijani Mitra as Brishti
- Poulomi Das / Sudipta Banerjee as Dr. Diya Lahiri – Anubhab's obsessive lover
- Rajshree Bhowmik as Bina Lahiri– Diya's mother
- Ananya Chattopadhyay as Pishimoni
- Suranjana Roy as Nandini Mukherjee aka Nanda – Anandi's younger sister
- Diyettima Ganguly as Rudrani Mukherjee aka Jhilik– Anandi's younger sister
- Sudip Sarkar
- Debarati Paul
- Rumpa Chatterjee
- Sudeshna Roy
- Aarush Dey

== Adaptations ==
Language	Title	Original Release	Network(s)	Last aired	Notes
Hindi	Thodasa Badal Thodasa Paani थोडासा बादल थोडासा पानी	23 August 2021	Colors TV	4 March 2022	Original
Bengali	Sona Roder Gaan সোনা রোদের গান	24 January 2022	Colors Bangla	27 November 2022	Remake
