= Manini De =

Indian television actress

Maninee De
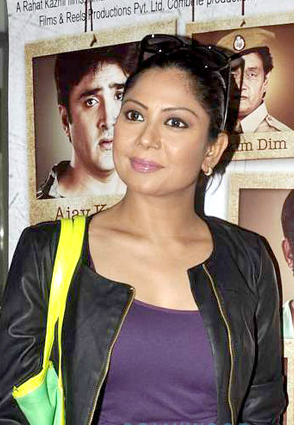
- Maninee De at the First look launch of 'Identity Card' in 2014
- Born: Delhi, India
- Occupation: Actress
- Years active: 1994–present
- Spouse: Mihir Mishra (m. 2004; sep. 2020)
- Children: 1
- Parent: Kanti De (mother)

Manini De is an Indian film and television actress who rose to stardom by playing the role of Katiya in Ssshhhh...Koi Hai, Pari Kapadia in Jassi Jaissi Koi Nahin. She is also known for her role as Dr Sonali Barwe in C.I.D. She has been a part of many TV serials. She has also appeared in films. She played the role of Shagun in Laado 2. From November 2023 to April 2024 she was seen as Rajrani Param Dhillon in Dalchini.

== Personal life ==
Her first marriage lasted five years before she got divorced from her first husband with whom she had a daughter named Dianoor "Diya". Her daughter Dianoor "Diya" from her first marriage was born in the year 2000. Manini married television actor Mihir Mishra on 30 December 2004. In July 2020, De told Bombay Times that she and Misra have been living separately for past six months.

== Career ==
Maninee De was one of the top ten finalists in the 1994 Miss India beauty pageant. Her career in television started as a host of interview show Mansi.

Maninee De was first recognized for playing Pari Kapadia, the best friend of villain Mallika, in the TV serial Jassi Jaissi Koi Nahin. Maninee played Aunt Chanchal in the TV series Ghar Ki Lakshmi Betiyaan. In 2005, she had a part in The Great Indian Comedy Show of Star One, and was also in the reality show Nach Baliye with her husband. Maninee De played Ragini in SAB TV's serial Twinkle Beauty Parlour, and also appeared in the Remix. Maninee has also appeared as Dr Sonali Barwe, a forensic expert, in the detective series C.I.D..

She also appeared in the popular Sahara one drama Kesariya Balam Aavo Hamare Des. In 2006, Maninee appeared in the film Krrish as a friend of the character of Priyanka Chopra. In 2007, she was seen as Ambalika in Naaginn. In 2008, Maninee appeared in the film Fashion as Sheena Bajaj, a fashion magazine expert. In 2009–2010, she appeared in the youth oriented Disney show Kya Mast Hai Life. She portrayed the role of a Bollywood superstar mother, Sushmita Juneja, who cannot speak Hindi properly. She also portrayed the role of Vijaya, elder sister of Sati, portrayed by Mouni Roy in mythological serial Devon Ke Dev – Mahadev. From 2011, she is occasionally seen in courtroom drama Adaalat as prosecution lawyer "Devyani Bose".

She had featured in Student of the Year where she played the role of Geetha, Abhimanyu (Siddharth Malhotra)'s bad aunt.

She was part of Diya Aur Baati Hum, aired on Star Plus and portrayed the character of inspector Singh.

== Filmography ==
=== Television ===
Year	Title	Role	Notes
1995	Mansi	Host	
1995–1996	Amma and Family	Farah	
2001–2002	Jannat	Mehndi	
2002–2003	Ssshhhh...Koi Hai	Various characters	
2003–2006	Jassi Jaissi Koi Nahin	Pari Kapadia	2004: Indian Telly Award for Best Actress in a Comic Role
	Shaka Laka Boom Boom	Zehreeli	
2004–2005	Saathiya – Pyar Ka Naya Ehsaas	Avanti Oberoi	
2004–2005	Hum 2 Hain Na	Sasha	
2005	Nach Baliye 1	Contestant	Participated with her husband Mihir Mishra
2005	Sarabhai vs Sarabhai	Dinky Chakraborty	Guest
2005	Remix	Chi Chi	
2005	The Great Indian Comedy Show	Various characters	
2006	Sarkarr:Rishton Ki Ankahi Kahani	Yana	
2006	Twinkle Beauty Parlour Lajpat Nagar	Ragini	
2006	Nach Baliye (Season 2)	Host/presenter	1 episode
2006–2009	Ghar Ki Lakshmi Betiyann	Chanchal	
2007	Jeete Hain Iske Liye	Ramona	
2007	Agadam Bagdam Tigdam	Katrina	Guest
2007	Naaginn – Waadon Ki Agniparikshaa	Ambalika	
2008	Bhoomi	Host	
2008	Jamegi Jodi.Com	Poornima	Cameo role
2009–2011	Kesariya Balam Aavo Hamare Des	Padma	
2009–2010	Kya Mast Hai Life	Sushmita Juneja	
2010–2011	C.I.D.	Dr Sonali Barwe	
2010–2011	Rang Badalti Odhani	Sasha	
2011	Ek Nayi Chhoti Si Zindagi	Revati	
2011–2013	Adaalat	Ms. Devyani Bose	
2012	Devon Ke Dev – Mahadev	Princess Vijaya	
2012	Madhubala – Ek Ishq Ek Junoon	Ila	
2013	The Buddy Project	Sneha Gujral	Cameo role
2013	Suvreen Guggal – Topper of The Year	Manini Seth	
2014–2015	Diya Aur Baati Hum	Officer Agrima Singh	
2014	Savdhaan India	Radhika	
2015	Kabhi Aise Geet Gaya Karo	Protibha	
2015	Gulmohar Grand		
2016	Satrangi Sasural	Vasundhara	
2016–2017	Pardes Mein Hai Meraa Dil	Sudha Mehra	
2017–2020	Baahubali: The Lost Legends	Shivgami	Voice role in Hindi and English versions
2017	Partners	Sushmita	
2017	Romil & Jugal	Sunita Kohli	
2017–2018	Naamkarann	Gurumaa / Raghu / Ragini Pandit	
2018	Laado 2	Shagun Sethi	
2018	Super Sisters – Chalega Pyar Ka Jaadu	Manolekha/Mini Mami	
2018	Yeh Teri Galiyan	Advocate Vani Kapoor	
2019	Haiwaan : The Monster	Vaishali Manoj Agnihotri	
2019	Laal Ishq	Ila	
2019	Abhay	Radhika	
2019	Coldd Lassi Aur Chicken Masala	Restaurant owner	
2019	Made in Heaven	Vimala Singh	
2021	Kuch Toh Hai: Naagin Ek Naye Rang Mein	Pam	
2023	The Jengaburu Curse	Lata Panigrahi	
2023	Campus Beats	Tapasvi Oberoi	
2023–2024	Udaariyaan	Baby Gill	
2023–2024	Dalchini	Rajrani Dhillon	
2024	Rabb Se Hai Dua	Ghazal Akhtar	

=== Films ===
Year	Film	Role	Notes
2003	Waisa Bhi Hota Hai Part II	Suman	
2003	Rules: Pyaar Ka Superhit Formula	Uday's wife	
2005	7 1/2 Phere: More Than a Wedding	Raveena Joshi	
2006	Krrish	Honey	
2007	Chain Kulii Ki Main Kulii	Nadira	
2008	Fashion	Sheena Bajaj	
2010	Ashok Chakra: Tribute to Real Heroes	Mrs. S. Ampte	
2012	Student of the Year	Geetha Singh	
2015	Sata Lota Pan Sagla Khota		

== Dubbing roles ==
=== Live action films ===
==== Hollywood films ====
Film title	Actress	Character	Dub language	Original language	Original year release	Dub year release	Notes
101 Dalmatians	Glenn Close	Cruella de Vil	Hindi	English	1996	Unknown	
The Mummy	Rachel Weisz	Evelyn Carnahan	Hindi	English	1999	1999	
102 Dalmatians	Glenn Close	Cruella de Vil	Hindi	English	2000	Unknown	
Iron Man	Gwyneth Paltrow	Pepper Potts	Hindi	English	2008	2008	
Death Race	Joan Allen	Claire Hennessey	Hindi	English	2008	2008	
Iron Man 2	Gwyneth Paltrow	Pepper Potts	Hindi	English	2010	2010	
The A-Team	Jessica Biel	Charissa Sosa	Hindi	English	2010	2010	
Total Recall	Jessica Biel	Melina	Hindi	English	2012	2012	
Mission: Impossible – Rogue Nation	Rebecca Ferguson	Ilsa Faust	Hindi	English	2015	2015	
Avengers: Age of Ultron	Claudia Kim	Helen Cho	Hindi	English	2015	2015	
The Fate of the Furious	Charlize Theron	Cipher	Hindi	English	2017	2017	
Mission: Impossible – Fallout	Rebecca Ferguson	Ilsa Faust	Hindi	English	2018	2018	
Captain Marvel	Annette Bening	Mar-vell	Hindi	English	2019	2019	
Maleficent: Mistress of Evil	Michelle Pfeiffer	Queen Ingris	Hindi	English	2019	2019	
The Sea Beast	Marianne Jean-Baptiste	Sarah Sharpe	Hindi	English	2022	2022	

==== South-Indian films ====
Film title	Actress	Character	Dub Language	Original language	Original Year Release	Dub Year Release	Notes
K.G.F: Chapter 1	Archana Jois	Shanthamma	Hindustani	Kannada	2018	2021	
Stalin	Khushbu Sundar	Jhansi	Hindustani	Telugu	2006	2022	
Anjaam Pathiraa	Unnimaya Prasad	DCP Catherine Maria	Hindi	Malayalam	2020	2022	The Hindi dub was titled: Police Story.
Raja the Great	Raadhika Sarathkumar	Constable Anantha Lakshmi	Hindi	Telugu	2017	2022	
Sarileru Neekevvaru	Vijayashanti	Bharathi	Hindi	Telugu	2020	2022	The Hindi dub was titled: Sarileru.
Varisu	Jayasudha	Sudha Rajendran	Hindi	Tamil	2023	2023	
Oh! Baby	Lakshmi	70 year-old Savitri alias "Baby"	Hindi	Telugu	2019	2023	
Ruler	Jayasudha	Sarojini Naidu	Hindi	Telugu	2019	2023	
Chandramukhi 2	Radhika Sarathkumar	Ragini	Hindi	Tamil	2023	2023	

=== Live action series ===
Title	Actress	Role	Dub language	Original language	Episodes	Original airdate	Dub airdate	Notes
Locke & Key	Laysla De Oliveira	Dodge	Hindi	English	20	7 February 2020		
