= Ashok Lokhande =

Indian actor

- Born: 9 September 1962 (age 63); Bombay, Maharashtra, India
- Occupation: Actor
- Years active: 1990–present
- Known for: Diya Aur Baati Hum; Kaatelal & Sons
- Children: Mallika Lokhande

Ashok Lokhande (born 9 September 1962) is an Indian film, television and theatre actor. He is best known for playing the role of Arun Rathi (Bhabasa) in the Star Plus Show Diya Aur Baati Hum and its sequel Tu Sooraj, Main Saanjh Piyaji.

== Education ==
He is an alumnus of the National School of Drama in New Delhi, India. He is also alumnus of LOK-HIT Higher Secondary School, Pusad.

== Career ==
Lokhande has appeared in small parts in television series including Chanakya (1990), Just Mohabbat (1997) and Saans (1999). He has also acted in films including Khamoshi: The Musical (1996) and Sarfarosh (1999).

He currently plays Dharampal Kaatelal Ruhail in the Sony Sab series Kaatelal & Sons.

== Film and television ==
- Teesri Azaadi (2006)
- Chanakya (1990)
- Dr. Babasaheb Ambedkar (2000) - Bhaurao Gaikwad
- Mrignayanee (1991)
- Khamoshi: The Musical (1996)
- Just Mohabbat (1997)
- Saans (1999)
- Sarfarosh (1999)
- Your Honour (2000)
- Son Pari (2000–2004)
- Jo Kahunga Sach Kahunga as Fateh Singh
- Black Friday (2004 film)
- Teesri Azadi
- Diya Aur Baati Hum (2011–2016)
- Mohabatain (1970)
- Brothers (2015)
- Raman Raghav 2.0 (2016 film)
- TV, Biwi aur Main (2017)
- Tu Sooraj Main Saanjh, Piyaji (2017-2018)
- Main Maike Chali Jaungi, Tum Dekhte Rahiyo(2019)
- Kaatelal & Sons (2020-2021)
- Ghum Hai Kisikey Pyaar Meiin (2025)
