= Megha Chakraborty =

Indian actress

- Born: Kolkata, West Bengal, India
- Occupation: Actress
- Years active: 2014–present
- Known for: Krishna Chali London; Kaatelal & Sons; Imlie
- Spouse: Sahil Phull (m. 2025)

Megha Chakraborty is an Indian film and television actress. She is best known for her portrayal of Dr. Krishna Dubey in Krishna Chali London, Garima Ruhail Rajawat in Kaatelal & Sons and Imlie Rathore Rana in Imlie. She was last seen in Jhanak spin off – Ishani as Ishani.

== Personal life ==
Chakraborty was born and brought up in Kolkata, West Bengal. She moved to Mumbai in 2014.

In January 2025, Chakraborty confirmed dating her Kaatelal & Sons co-actor Sahil Phull and shared her engagement news. The couple got married on 21 January 2025 in Jammu, in a traditional wedding ceremony.

== Career ==
She started her career with the Bengali serial Joto Hashi Tato Ranna. Her big break in Hindi Television was Badii Devrani. After that, she was seen in TV shows like Khwaabon Ki Zamin Par and Peshwa Bajirao and became a household name with Krishna Chali London.

She also played the main protagonist Gulaal in the film Desert Tears which portrayed persecution of women in rural India and was shot in Rajasthan.

In November 2020, she started playing the lead role of Garima Ruhail Rajawat in Kaatelal & Sons opposite Ankit Mohan initially and later on opposite Sahil Phull. After the show ended, she and Phull started their own production company Mismanaged Company. Her first production would be the web show Dil-E-Couch where she portrayed the role of Nima, with the series premiere on the YouTube channel "Mismanaged Company".

From September 2022 to September 2023, she portrayed the role of Imlie Atharv Rana opposite Karan Vohra in Star Plus' Imlie. From July to November 2024, she played Vaani Tripathi alongside Shruti Bhist and Namish Taneja in Colors TV's Mishri.

== Filmography ==
=== Films ===
Year	Title	Role	Notes
2014	Action	Rini	
2018	Confessions	Mahima	Short Film
2021	Desert Tears		

=== Television ===
Year	Title	Role	Ref.
2013	Joto Hasi Toto Ranna		
2015	Badii Devrani	Reeti Poddar	
2016–2017	Khwaabon Ki Zamin Par	Niyati Bajpayee	
2017	Peshwa Bajirao	Mastani	
2018–2019	Krishna Chali London	Dr. Krishna Dubey Sahay	
2020–2021	Kaatelal & Sons	Garima "Gunnu" Ruhail Rajawat	
2022–2023	Imlie	Imlie Rathore Rana	
2022	Swaraj	Debi Chaudhrani	
2024	Mishri	Vaani Tripathi	
2025	Jhanak	Ishani Sengupta	
2025	Ishani	Ishani Sengupta	

=== Web series ===
Year	Title	Role	Notes
2021	Dil-E-Couch	Nima	Also co-producer

=== Music videos ===
Year	Title	Singer	Notes
2021	Ho Tum Kahan	Nikhil Paul George	Also co-producer
2022	Tere Baad Phir Kisi Se	Asit Tripathi, Faaiz Anwar, and Rashid Khan	Also co-producer
