= Mishri =

2024 Indian Hindi TV series

- Genre: Drama; Romance
- Directed by: Atif Khan
- Creative director: Rashmi Ranjana
- Starring: Shruti Bhist; Namish Taneja; Megha Chakraborty
- Country of origin: India
- Original language: Hindi
- No. of episodes: 122

Production
- Production locations: Mathura and Mumbai
- Cinematography: Shahbaz Khan
- Camera setup: Multi-camera
- Running time: 22 minutes
- Production company: Story Square Productions

Original release
- Network: Colors TV
- Release: 3 July – 3 November 2024

Mishri (transl. Rock Sugar) is an Indian Hindi-language television series that premiered from 3 July 2024 on Colors TV. It is produced by Story Square Productions and it stars Shruti Bhist, Namish Taneja and Megha Chakraborty. It is an official remake of the Colors Kannada TV series Lakshmi Baramma.

== Plot ==
Set in Mathura and Gangapur, Mishri Sharma is considered a lucky charm by her village. After her father dies, she is raised by her abusive aunt Bela and Bela's brother, Shakti. They actively exploit her reputation is exploited for personal gains while actively sabotaging her dreams of higher education. Mishri's grandmother decides to arrange her marriage to a respectable city man to save her from their grasp.

In Mathura, Raghav Dwivedi is a wealthy, devoted family man who is secretly targeted by his greedy aunt, Chitra, for control of the family business. Raghav is deeply in love with Vaani Tripathi, a career-driven fashion designer. However, their desire to marry gets complicated by a bitter, years long feud between their mothers, Parvati and Kalpana.

Mishri's grandmother intervenes, when she finds out that Bela and Shakti are plotting to retain control of Mishri's property by tricking her into marrying Shakti. Through a series of misunderstandings, Bela makes Mishri believe that she engaged to Raghav. Raghav's family reluctantly agrees to let him marry Vaani to end their long standing feud. On the day of the weddings, circumstances force Raghav to travel to Gangapur. Raghav steps in and marries Mishri himself and saves Mishri from stepping into a forced marriage alliance with Shakti and also from an impending attack by Chitra's goons.

After the ceremony, Raghav clarifies that he cannot accept Mishri as his wife because he loves someone else. Mishri moves to Mathura and coincidentally finds shelter with Vaani, who views her as a younger sister. Unaware of the marriage, Vaani introduces Mishri to her fiancé, Raghav. Mishri, however, discovers that she is the designated astrological "human shield" meant to protect Raghav from a fatal curse, which forces her to stay close to him while hiding their marriage from Vaani.

== Cast ==
=== Main ===
- Shruti Bhist as Mishri Sharma: Raghav's wife; Vaani's friend; Hari's daughter.
- Namish Taneja as Raghav Dwivedi: Owner of a tours and travels business; Mishri's husband; Vaani's former fiancé; Parvati and Anirudh's son; Riddhi's brother.
- Megha Chakraborty as Vaani Tripathi: A fashion designer; Raghav's former fiancé; Mishri's friend; Kalpana and Kailash's daughter.

=== Recurring ===
- Jasveer Kaur as Chitra Dwivedi: Raghav's paternal aunt and business partner
- Archana Singh as Parvati Dwivedi: Raghav and Riddhi's mother; Anirudh's wife; Mishri's mother-in-law
- Sangeeta Kapure as Kalpana Tripathi: Vaani's mother; Kailash's wife; Raghav's former mother-in-law
- Manmohan Tiwari as Shakti: Bela's brother
- Swati Chitnis as Mrs. Sharma: Hari's mother; Mishri's grandmother
- Meena Nathani as Sulochana Dwivedi: Raghav's grandmother; Chitra, Supriya and Anirudh's mother; Parvati's mother-in-law
- Riya Sharma as Riddhi Dwivedi: Raghav's younger sister; Parvati and Anirudh's daughter; Mishri's sister-in-law
- Soma Rathod as Bela: Mishri's aunt
- Jyoti Tiwari as Supriya: Raghav's paternal aunt; Ranjit's wife
- Ajay Dhansu as Ranjit: Raghav's uncle; Supriya's husband
- Prithvi Zutshi as Raghav's grandfather: Sulochana's husband; Chitra, Supriya and Anirudh's father; Parvati's father-in-law
- Shashank Shukla as Gopal: Dwivedi family's house help
- Amit Poddar as Bunty: Bela's son; Bubbly's husband; Giri's father; Mishri's cousin
- Tabassum as Bubbly; Bunty's wife; Giri's mother; Bela's daughter-in-law; Mishri's sister-in-law
- Rishabh Jain as Giri: Bunty and Bubbly's son; Mishri's nephew
- Vishesh Sharma as Samarth: College's trustee

=== Special appearances ===
- Deepika Singh as Mangal Saxena from Mangal Lakshmi
- Aman Verma as Hari Sharma: Mishri's father (Dead)

== Production ==
=== Development ===
Manmohan Tiwari gained weight to fit in his role. He said, "To prepare for the negative lead in this show, Tiwari underwent a physical transformation for the role, which included gaining weight and dyeing his hair to appear older. This effort is to ensure that the character stands out and truly comes to life, conveying exactly what it needs to and leaving a strong impression on the audience."

== Adaptations ==
Language	Title	Original release	Network	Last aired	Notes
Kannada	Lakshmi Baramma ಲಕ್ಷ್ಮಿ ಬಾರಮ್ಮಾ	4 March 2013	Colors Kannada	25 January 2020	Original
Gujarati	Laxmi Sadaiv Mangalam લક્ષ્મી સદૈવ મંગલમ	29 January 2018	Colors Gujarati	17 April 2021	Remake
Tamil	Vandhal Sridevi வந்தாள் ஸ்ரீதேவி	11 April 2018	Colors Tamil	28 June 2019	Remake
Marathi	Lakshmi Sadaiv Mangalam लक्ष्मी सदैव मंगलम्	14 May 2018	Colors Marathi	25 May 2019	Remake
Hindi	Mishri मिश्री	3 July 2024	Colors TV	3 November 2024	Remake
