= Ranbir Rano =

- Promotional logo
- Created by: Rajesh Beri; Diamond Pictures
- Directed by: Chander Behi khalid Akhtar
- Starring: Ravi Dubey; Vinay Rohrra; Achint Kaur; Mihika Verma; Rajendra Gupta
- Opening theme: "Ranbir Rano" by ??
- Country of origin: India
- Original language: Hindi
- No. of episodes: 128

Production
- Producer: Sheel Kumar
- Running time: approx. 24 minutes

Original release
- Network: Zee TV
- Release: 22 September 2008 – 28 May 2009

Ranbir Rano is a Hindi television series produced by Diamond Pictures that aired on Zee TV channel between 22 September 2008 – 28 May 2009. The show was very popular in that time and TRP was 5.9 when it was telecasting in Zee TV. The story summary is: two young souls in search of love, as and a natural view of the Punjab and an unconditional belief in the power of destiny.

== Plot ==
The story is set in a small town in the Punjab, Dera Bassi. Ranbir and Rano live in Dera Bassi. Rano is from a conservative Punjabi family and has limited exposure to the outside world. Her father is the station master of Dera Bassi. One day, on her way to Dharamsala, she meets the man who is to become the love of her life: Ranbir. What transpires after that is what dreams are made of – sweet moments between the couple, feuding households, and love that outshines the toughest of all obstacles.

== Cast ==
=== Main ===
- Vinay Rohrra / Ravi Dubey ... Ranbir (Vinay was the old Ranbir)
- Sakshi Talwar ... Rano

=== Recurring cast ===
- Achint Kaur ... Preet Bahan-Jee, Ranbir's eldest sister
- Deep Dhillon... Ranbir's father
- Rajendra Gupta ... Bau-Jee, Rano's Father
- Pankaj Berry... Rano's Fouh-jee chacha/uncle
- Kunika Lal ... Kamla, Rano's Step mother
- Mihika Verma... Tina, Ranbir's close friend
- Tarun Madan ... Vicky
