= Rajeshwari Datta =

Indian actress and entertainer

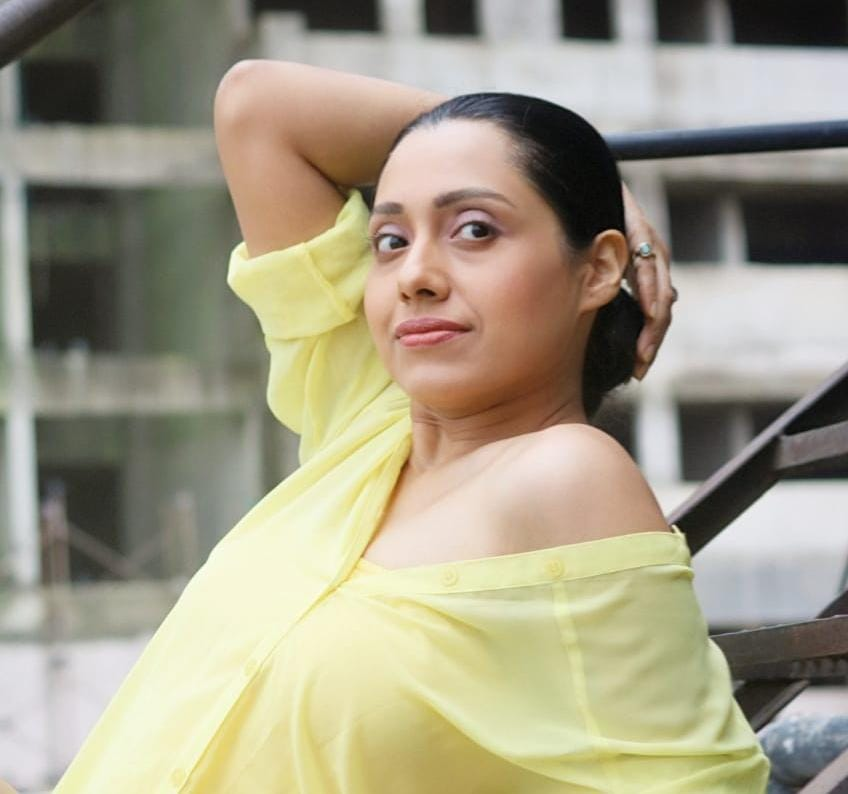
- Born: 22 September 1988 (age 38); Kolkata, West Bengal, India
- Occupation: Actor
- Years active: 2014–present
- Known for: Jamai Raja, Tujhse Hai Raabta, Meri Hanikarak Biwi
- Spouse: Rohit Mehta (m. 2022)

Rajeshwari Datta (born 22 September 1988) is an Indian actress known for her work in Indian cinema and television. She tends to play "negative" roles in Bollywood cinema.

== Career ==
She has continually stated that she enjoys "negative roles." She describes these roles as "challenging," such as her role as Chanda in the series Meri Hanikarak Biwi or her role as Mitul on Jamai Raja. Other roles that she has described as such is the show Tujhse Hai Raabta, where her performance was compared with Jayshree T. Datta said that Jayshree T described her performance as "funny" and enjoyable.

In 2022, she ventured into historical genre at the encouragement of her spouse Rohit Mehta. She described the process requiring speaking Hinglish as "the most difficult character in my acting career so far."

In 2026, she starred alongside her husband in the series Sarpanch.

== Personal life ==
She married actor Rohit Mehta on 18 July 2022 in Mumbai, India.

== Filmography ==
=== Film ===
- Devdoot (2004)
- Meghor sobi (2014)
- Madhu Lagan

=== Television ===
Year	Title	Role	Notes
2014	Phir Jeene Ki Tamanna Hai	Vedika	
2014–2017	Jamai Raja	Mitul Sengupta	
2018–2021	Tujhse Hai Raabta	Aparna Deshmukh	
2019	Meri Hanikarak Biwi	Chanda	
2021–2022	Vidrohi	Panthara Devi	
2022–2023	Corporate Sarpanch – Beti Desh Ki	Ankita	
2023–2025	Kaise Mujhe Tum Mil Gaye	Deepika	
2025	Aami Dakini	Piyali	
2026–present	Queen	Kalyani Mukherjee	

=== Web series ===
Year	Series	Role
2018	Mad news	Chutki Devi; Khuli Mukherjee
