= Murugaatrupadai =

2014 Indian film by K Muruganandam

- Official poster
- Directed by: K Muruganandam
- Starring: Saravanan; Navika
- Cinematography: Senthil Kumar
- Edited by: A. L. Ramesh
- Music by: Ganesh Raghavendra
- Production company: Sigaram Visual Media
- Release date: 14 November 2014
- Country: India
- Language: Tamil

Murugaatrupadai (transl. Air force) is a 2014 Indian Tamil-language romantic action comedy thriller film directed by K Muruganandam and starring Saravanan and Navika, in her lead film debut.

== Cast ==
- Saravanan as Murugan
- Navika as Meenakshi
- Rajasimman as Sooran
- Ramesh Khanna
- Devadarshini
- V. S. Raghavan

== Production ==
A song was shot at the Andaman Islands.

== Reception ==
A critic from The Times of India wrote that "There is very little that is remarkable about this film which has a run-of-the-mill plot". Malini Mannath of The New Indian Express opined that "A dull screenplay, lacklustre narration and uninspiring leads ensure that one gets totally alienated from this film. The director cannot make up his mind on whether it is an action thriller or a comedy". A critic from Dinamalar gave the film a negative review.
