= Rohit Choudhary =

Indian film and Television actor

- Born: India
- Occupation: Actor
- Years active: 2016-present

Rohit Choudhary is an Indian actor. He is primarily known for playing roles in projects like Padmaavat, Naagin, Dalchini, Bhahmarakshas, Kumkum Bhagya and Swaran Ghar.

== Biography ==
Choudhary made his screen debut in the 2016 TV series Khwaabon Ki Zamin Par. In 2017, he acted in Prem Ya Paheli – Chandrakanta. He made appearances in the film Padmaavat, TV series Naagin and Kundali Bhagya in the year 2018. In the year 2019, he acted in television series Divya-Drishti and Qayamat Ki Raat. In the year 2020, he appeared in Kartik Purnima, Brahmarakshas 2 and Shrikant Bashir. In 2021, he made appearance in Kumkun Bhagya and Swaran Ghar in the year 2022. In 2023, he performed in Gauna – Ek Pratha, Bekaboo, and Dalchini.

== Filmography ==
=== Films ===
Year	Title	Role	Notes
2018	Padmaavat	Ikhtiyaar	

=== Television ===
Year	Title	Role	Notes
2016	Khwaabon Ki Zamin Par	Major Ram	
2017	Prem Ya Paheli - Chandrkanta	Prince Jai Aditya	
2018	Naagin	Rohit Jaiswal	
2018	Kundali Bhagya	Sanju	
2018–2019	Qayamat Ki Raat	Viraaj Kukreja	
2019	Divya Drishti	Vicky	
2020	Kartik Purnima	Yesh Oberoi	
2020	Brahmrakshas 2	Robin Mehra	
2021	Kumkum Bhagya	Pradeep Khurana	
2022	Swaran Ghar	Vikram Bedi	
2022	Mauka-E-Vardaat	Foolchand	
2023	Gauna - Ek Pratha	Tej Pratap	
2023	Bekaboo	Yatin Gandhi	
2023	Bindiya Sarkar	Raghav / Surya Pratap Singh	
2023–2024	Dalchini	Tej Dhillon	
2024	Deewani	Rudra Yadav	
2025	Bade Achhe Lagte Hain 4	Vikram Bhalla	

=== Web series ===
Year	Title	Role	Notes
2020	Shrikant Bashir	Dr. Kunal	
