= Khwaabon Ki Zamin Par =

- Genre: Love Story Drama
- Opening theme: Khwaabon Ki Zamin Par by Sanjeev Batra & Leena Bose
- Country of origin: India
- Original language: Hindi
- No. of seasons: 1
- No. of episodes: 150

Production
- Producers: Anupam Kher; Actor Prepares Production
- Production locations: Lucknow, Mumbai (India)
- Running time: 30 minutes (including commercial breaks)

Original release
- Network: Zindagi
- Release: 3 October 2016 – 25 March 2017

Khwaabon Ki Zamin Par is an original soap opera of Zindagi television. This fiction show is produced by Anupam Kher. The film stars Ashish Kadian, Megha Chakraborty and Deeksha Sonalkar.

== Cast ==
- Ashish Kadian as Arya Kashyap (main male lead)
- Megha Chakraborty as Niyati Bajpayee (main female lead)
- Deeksha Sonalkar as Shikha Roy (celebrity actress)
- Saurabh as Mohan Bajpayee
- Rohit Choudhary as Ranjan Awasthi, Niyati's Jiju
- Astha Agarwal as Arya's co-actor, an established movie star
- Aashish Kaul
- Parichay Sharma
- Aliraza Namdar
- Gulfam Khan
- Antariksh Takkar

== See also ==
- Agar Tum Saath Ho
