= Anandibaa Aur Emily =

Indian soap opera

- Genre: Comedy drama; Drama
- Created by: Vipul D. Shah
- Written by: Hemant Kewani; Rohit Malhotra; Devang Kakkar; Ghazala Nargis
- Directed by: Kedar Shinde
- Creative director: Hemant Kewani
- Starring: Jazzy Ballerini; Mishkat Varma; Kanchan Gupta
- Theme music composer: Puneet Dixit
- Country of origin: India
- Original language: Hindi
- No. of seasons: 1
- No. of episodes: 109

Production
- Executive producers: Rishabh Sharma; Tony Singh
- Camera setup: Multi-camera
- Running time: 20-22 minutes
- Production company: Optimystix Entertainment

Original release
- Network: StarPlus
- Release: 4 July – 1 November 2022

Anandibaa Aur Emily (transl. Anandibaa and Emily) is an Indian Hindi-language comedy drama television serial created by Vipul D. Shah under Optimystix Entertainment. Starring Jazzi Ballerini, Mishkat Varma, and Kanchan Gupta, it premiered on 4 July 2022 on StarPlus and digitally streams on Disney+ Hotstar. Set in Gondal, the series started off as a humorous and wholesome exploration through the saas-bahu trope, driven by Emily being a foreigner, of various Indian family dynamics. The show aired its last episode on 1 November 2022.

== Premise ==
The show revolves around Emily, a Western daughter-in-law married to Aarav, and Anandibaa, a matriarch and social leader, who is initially not receptive to the reality of her son's marriage. Living in Gondal, Aarav has had dreams of moving to America, whereas Emily has had wishes of settling in India. Through a closely known connection, their paths fatefully collide, depicting how Emily may or may not meld into the stereotype of the perfect Indian family.

== Cast ==
=== Main ===
- Jazzy Ballerini as Emily Andrews Sanghani: A purposeful American woman seeking Indian culture and family, wife to Aarav.
- Kanchan Gupta as Anandibaa Sanghani: Gondal's fiercely moral and traditionalist society leader, mother to Aarav.
- Mishkat Varma as Aarav Sanghani: A jobless aspirant of Western success and husband to Emily.

=== Recurring ===
- Dhaval Barbhaya as Aagya Sanghani: Meek and mannered husband to Gunjan and son to Anandi.
- Shruti Rawat as Gunjan Sanghani: Beguiling daughter-in-law of the house, wife to Aagya and mother to a son.
- Shweta Rajput as Pinky: Airhead seeking her dreamboat Aarav and little sister to Gunjan.
- Ojas Rawal as Gulabdas: Religiously devoted and spoiled husband to Kanchan.
- Shruti Gholap as Kanchan: Benevolent minded wife to Gulabdas.
- Manav Soneji as Jaman: Local hotel owner and close friend to Aarav.
- Atharv Sharma as Tenny Sanghani: Gunjan's son
- Mansi Thakkar as Payal: Equally unique like her brother, Gulabdas.
- Miloni Kapadia as Riddhi: Aarav's friend
- Krishnakant Singh Bundela as Panditji

=== Guest ===
- Apara Mehta as Jaibala
- Meghan Jadhav as Krishna
- Nimisha Vakharia as Kalandi: Anandibaa's older sister

== Production ==
=== Casting ===
In an effort to find a suitable match and do justice with the character concept, a multitude of actresses were auditioned before British actress Jazzy Ballerini was cast as the lead mid-2021. After two months of language training, production cast the remaining co-stars and ensemble.

Following the commencement of the series several stars have made guest appearances. In August 2022, Meghan Jadhav was brought on as Krishna for Janmashtami and the ensuing stories. As the narrative evolved, the series decisively shifted through genres, coinciding with changes to its ensemble and character depictions, departing from the original sitcom concept.

=== Release ===
Promotion of the series began in June 2022 with an initial release date set for 27 June 2022, replacing the short lived Yeh Jhuki Jhuki Si Nazar. The actual premiere date was pushed to 4 July 2022 while simultaneously being released on Disney+ Hotstar. Following the conclusion of the series, Banni Chow Home Delivery was rescheduled from prime time to take the early evening slot.

== Reception ==
=== Critical reception ===
After the first episode, Pinkvilla offered a limited view, taking interest in the subtle humour and calling it a "much-needed breather", while also being skeptical of the 6:30pm debut time slot.

== See also ==
- List of programmes broadcast by StarPlus
