= Kaatelal & Sons =

Indian television series

- Genre: Comedy
- Created by: Abhimanyu Singh
- Written by: Mohinder Pratap Singh
- Screenplay by: Sweksha Bhagat
- Story by: Ravi Bhushan; Shabia Walia; Nitish Ranjan
- Directed by: Ravi Bhushan; Ranjan Singh Kumar
- Creative director: Dixit Kaul
- Starring: See below
- Theme music composer: Sargam Jassu; Nakash Aziz
- Opening theme: Re Choria Kadak Hain Dil Mein Dhadak Hain
- Country of origin: India
- Original language: Hindi
- No. of seasons: 1
- No. of episodes: 202

Production
- Producers: Abhimanyu Singh; Roopali Singh
- Cinematography: Sandeep Yadav; Mohsin Khan
- Editor: Satya Sharma
- Camera setup: Multi-camera
- Running time: 21-25 minutes
- Production company: Contiloe Entertainment

Original release
- Network: Sony SAB
- Release: 16 November 2020– 27 August 2021

Kaatelal & Sons is an Indian television series that aired on Sony SAB from 16 November 2020 to 27 August 2021. Produced by Contiloe Entertainment, it starred Jiya Shankar, Megha Chakraborty, Ashok Lokhande, Paras Arora, Sahil Phull and Vinay Rohrra.

== Plot ==
The plot initially focused on twin sisters Susheela and Garima, who fight against patriarchal traditions to run the family's ancestral salon called Kaatelal & Sons by disguising themselves as Gunnu-Sattu when their father had an accident. They soon realise that their passion was the saloon.

When they face the same norms of patricarchy from their fatherand in-laws, they again successfully change the society's and their father and in-laws' mentality and achieved their dream with the help of their husbands Agni Rajawat (Garima's husband), Madhav Solanki (Susheela's husband), and Susheela's former fiancé, Dr.Pramod Chautala and the twins' cousin Putrapaal 'Puttu' Kaatelal Ruhail, and Puttu's love interest and friend, also Agni's sister, Pavni.

== Cast ==
=== Main ===
- Megha Chakraborty as Garima "Gunnu" Kaatelal Ruhail Rajawat – Dharampal and Kusum's elder daughter; Susheela's elder twin sister; Agni's wife. (2020–2021)
- Jiya Shankar as Susheela "Sattu" Kaatelal Ruhail Solanki – Dharampal and Kusum's younger daughter; Garima's younger twin sister; Pramod's ex-fiancée, Madhav's wife. (2020–2021)
- Ashok Lokhande as Dharampal Kaatelal Ruhail – Shishupal's brother; Kusum's husband; Garima and Susheela's father. (2020–2021)
- Paras Arora as Dr.Pramod Chautala – Meenakshi and Jai's son, Susheela's ex-fiancé, Shekhar's friend. (2020–2021)
- Sahil Phull as S.H.O Agni Rajawat – Komal's son; Paavni's brother; Garima's husband. (2021)
- Vinay Rohrra as Madhav Solanki - Balraj's adoptive son, Omi's adoptive brother, Susheela's husband.(2021)

=== Recurring ===
- Sachin Chaudhary as Putrapaal "Puttu" Kaatelal Ruhail – Shishupal and Chanchal's son; Garima, Susheela and Ritu's cousin brother; Paavni's love interest. (2020–2021)
- Hemaakshi Ujjain as Kusum Kaatelal Ruhail – Dharampal's wife; Garima and Susheela's mother. (2020–2021)
- Swati Tarar as Chanchal "Chatur" Kaatelal Ruhail – Ghanshyam's sister; Shishupal's wife; Putrapaal's mother. (2020–2021)
- Manoj Goyal as Shishupal Kaatelal Ruhail – Dharampal's brother; Chanchal's husband; Putrapaal's father. (2020–2021)
- Meena Mir as Komal Devi Rajawat – Agni and Pavni's mother. (2021)
- Prerna Thakur as Pavni Rajawat – Komal's daughter; Agni's sister; Putrapaal's love interest(2021)
- Pankaj Berry as Balraj Solanki – Omi's father; Madhav's adoptive father. (2021)
- Sydharth Jeet Singh as Omi Solanki – Balraj's son; Madhav's adoptive brother. (2021)
- Ankit Mohan as Vikram – Jagat's namesake brother; Garima's former love-interest; Gunnu's best friend; Priyanka's boyfriend (2020–2021).
- Alice Kaushik as Priyanka Chautala – Garima and Susheela's friend; Vikram's girlfriend(2020–2021)
- Deepak Tokas as Jagat Seth PhD – Dharampal's rival; Vikram's namesake brother. (2020–2021)
- Manav Soneji as Phitkari – A helper in Kaatelal & Sons. (2020–2021).
- Karuna Verma as CMO Dr. Meenakshi "Mini" Chautala – Jai's wife; Pramod's mother. (2020–2021)
- Hans Dev Sharma as Dr. Jai Chautala – Meenakshi's husband; Pramod's father. (2020–2021)
- Sanjeev Satija as Chunni – Dharampal, Avatar and Lallan's friend. (2020–2021)
- Sandeep Sharma as Satyapal – Chunni and Dharampal's friend. (2021)
- Mukesh Chandel as Lallan – Dharampal, Chunni and Avatar's friend. (2020–2021)
- Naman Arora as Ompal, Jagat's first righthand. (2020–2021)
- Prashanth Goswami as Satbeer, Jagat's second righthand. (2020–2021)
- Thakur Rajveer Singh as Bhagwan Das – A thief (2021)
- Jayant Raval as Ghanshyam – Chanchal's brother; Ritu's father (2021)
- Simran Arora as Ritu – Ghanshyam's daughter; Putrapaal's cousin. (2021)
- Sapan Gulati as Shekhar – Ritu's fiancé, Pramod's London based friend. (2021)
- Vedika Bhandari as Lily – Pramod's fake wife sent by Meenakshi (2021)
- Radhika Chhabra as Billy Cat – Kitkot famous girl with modern thoughts; first female customers of Kaatelal & Sons (2020–2021)

=== Cameo ===
- Sukhbir as himself: the guest at Lohri (2021)

== Production ==
=== Casting ===
Jiya Shankar and Megha Chakraborty were cast to play Garima and Susheela respectively. Alongside them Ankit Mohan and Paras Arora was cast to play their love interest. While in February Mohan made an exit making Sahil Phull entering the parallel lead. In July even Arora left the show making Vinay Rohra enter the show as the new lead.

== See also ==
- List of programs broadcast by Sony SAB
