= Dalchini (TV series) =

Indian drama television series

- Genre: Drama
- Created by: Sargun Mehta
- Screenplay by: Lakshmi Jaykumar; Divya Nayyar
- Story by: Farhan Salaruddin; Divyana Khanna; Dialogues; Zahir Sheikh
- Directed by: Amit Gupta
- Creative director: Yakshi Bhudathoki
- Starring: Rohit Choudhary; Maira Dharti Mehra; Manini Mishra
- Theme music composer: Ripul Sharma
- Opening theme: Kudiye Jaise Dalchini
- Country of origin: India
- Original languages: Hindi; Punjabi
- No. of seasons: 1
- No. of episodes: 138

Production
- Producers: Sargun Mehta; Ravi Dubey
- Cinematography: Raj Gauli; Basanth Takur
- Editors: Dharmesh Patel; Rajesh Indra Jhangda
- Camera setup: Multi-Camera
- Running time: 22-24 minutes
- Production company: Dreamiyata Entertainment Private Limited

Original release
- Network: Dangal
- Release: 6 November 2023 – 13 April 2024

Dalchini (transl. Cinnamon) is an Indian Hindi-language television family drama series that premiered from 6 November 2023 to 13 April 2024 on Dangal. It is produced by Sargun Mehta and Ravi Dubey under Dreamiyata Entertainment Private Limited. The series stars Maira Dharti Mehra and Rohit Choudhary.

== Plot ==
Dalchini follows the story of Falak (Dalchini), a young woman from a rural village who discovers her passion and talent for cooking, despite her lack of formal education. However, her journey is not without challenges, as she must navigate a complicated relationship with her mother-in-law, Rajrani, who is an accomplished chef in her own right. As the two women with vastly different personalities and culinary skills come together as saas bahu, tensions rise and conflicts arise.

Dalchini, a cheerful happy go lucky girl runs her household by cooking for people. She gets an order from the Dhillon Masala factory whose owner is Rajarani Dhillon (Manini Mishra), she calls Dalchini in order to help her cook prasad for a satsang organized by her family. But the prasad was cooked by Dalchini(due to Vimmy's conspiracy to destroy the prasad cooked by Rajrani)and Rajrani fakes that she cooked it (in order to save her family's Pride). Guruji learns about this and asks Dalchini but she fakes that the prasad was cooked by Rajrani. Rajrani hates Dalchini because the prasad cooked by Dalchini was liked by everyone in the satsang even her family members. But everyone who thinks that the Prasad was cooked by Rajrani were appreciating her. Tej an NRI handsome guy returns Monga and meets Dalchini and falls for her but after learning that due to her his mother was insulted in the satsang he started to hate her. Due to some circumstances Tej marries Dalchini while Rajrani decides to make her life hell.

Rajrani uses Dalchini's sister Kala who is obsessed with Tej against Dalchini

== Cast ==
=== Main ===
- Maira Dharti Mehra as Falak “Dalchini” Dhillon: Kala’s sister; Tej's wife (2023-2024)
- Rohit Choudhary as Tej Dhillon: Rajrani and Param's son; Karan's half brother; Falak's husband (2023-2024)

=== Recurring ===
- Maninee De as Rajrani Dhillon: Param's wife; Tej's mother (2023-2024)
- Raman Dhagga as Param Dhillon: Rajrani and Rupa's husband; Tej and Karan's father (2023-2024)
- Mamta Rana as Divya Dhillon (2023-2024)
- Ranjit Riaz Sharma as Mr Dhillon: Manjyot's husband; Param's father (2023-2024)
- Unknown / Neelam Hundal Randhawa as Manjyot Dhillon: Param's mother (2023-2024) / (2024)
- Pranjali Singh Parihar as Kala: Falak’s younger sister; Tej’s one-sided ex-lover; Deepak 's wife (2023-2024)
- Aasim Khan as Deepak Dhillon: Vimmi's son; Kala 's husband (2023-2024)
- Amandeep Kaur as Vimmi Dhillon: Deepak's mother (2023-2024)
- Vishal Saini as Chachaji (2023-2024)
- Inderpreet Sahni as Lily (2023-2024)
- Siddhi Rothore as Ruhi Dhillon (2023-2024)
- Anchit Naruta as Samarth Dhillon (2023-2024)
- Muni Jha as Guru Maharaj (2023)
- Aman Sutdhar as Falak’s teacher (2024)
- Gautam Vig as Karan Dhillon; Param and Rupa's son; Tej's half-brother (2024)

== Production ==
=== Development ===
In October 2023 The series was announced by Dreamiyata Entertainment for Dangal TV. The show was released on 6 November 2023.The show replaced Ishq Ki Dastaan - Naagmani.

=== Filming ===
In October 2023, principal photography commenced in Chandigarh, the series is set in Punjab. It went off air on 13 April 2024
