= Swati Chitnis =

Indian television actress (born 17th oct 1957)

- Born: Swati Tipnis; 1958 or 1959 (age 67–68); India
- Occupation: Television, Stage, Movies actress
- Years active: 1984–present
- Spouse: Cdr Amol Chitnis (m. 1981; died 2008)
- Children: 1 Neel Chitnis.

Swati Chitnis (born 1958/1959) is an Indian television actress who works in films, television and Marathi stage. She played the pivotal role of Suhasini Ajmera Goenka, who is Kartik Goenka's grandmother; Akshara Goenka Sharma's great-grandmother and Abhira Sharma Poddar's great-great-grandmother in the second and third generations of Star Plus's longest-running soap opera Yeh Rishta Kya Kehlata Hai from 2016 to 2023.

Chitnis has appeared in films such as Shubhamangal Savadhan and Hee Porgi Kunachi. She later appeared in television shows such as Laagi Tujhse Lagan, Bhai Bhaiya Aur Brother. She also appeared in Star Plus's series Iss Pyaar Ko Kya Naam Doon?, where she played Dadi (Subhadra / Sumi), Arnav's paternal grandmother.

== Filmography ==
- Ventilator (2016) as Indu
- Lagna Pahave Karun as Nalini Dixit
- Rajjo (2013) as Ammi
- Road to Sangam (2010) as Aara
- Shubha Mangal Saavadhan (2006)
- Hee Porgi Kunachi (2006) as Mrs. Deshmukh
- Jungle (2000) as Mrs. Malhotra

== Television ==
Year	Series	Character	Channel
1997	Paltan		DD National
2000	Alag Alag	Lalita	
2001-2003	Avantika	Ratna	Alpha TV Marathi
2004-2008	Adhuri Ek Kahani	Anandita	Alpha TV Marathi
2008-2009	Jasuben Jayantilaal Joshi Ki Joint Family	Jasumati Jayantilaal Joshi	NDTV Imagine
2009-2010	Mitwa Phool Kamal Ke	Mahaviri	Star Plus
2009-2012	Laagi Tujhse Lagan	Aayi Sahib	Colors TV
2012	Iss Pyaar Ko Kya Naam Doon?	Subhadra	Star Plus
2012	Bhai Bhaiya Aur Brother	Jamuna Mahendra Chawla	Sony SAB
2013	Sasural Simar Ka	Shobha	Colors TV
2016–2023	Yeh Rishta Kya Kehlata Hai	Suhasini "Mimi" Ajmera Goenka	Star Plus
2016	Nakushi – Tarihi Havihavishi		Star Pravah
2024	Mishri	Mrs. Sharma	Colors TV
2025–2026	Saru	Annapurna Indravadan Bajaj	Zee TV
2024–2025	Tu Hi Re Maza Mitwa	Subhadra Rajeshirke	Star Pravah
