= Meghan Jadhav =

Indian actor

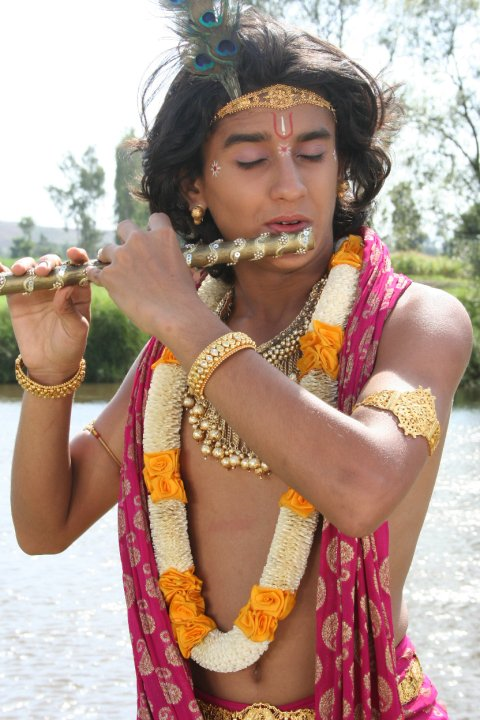
- Meghan Jadhav in Jai Shri Krishna
- Born: 7 June 1992 (age 34); Mumbai, Maharashtra, India
- Occupation: Actor
- Years active: 2005–present
- Known for: Jai Shri Krishna; Tenali Rama; Suryaputra Karn
- Spouse: Anushka Pimputkar (m. 2025)

Meghan Jadhav is an Indian television and film actor. He made his acting debut in 2006 with Raavan, playing young Vibhishan. He is known for his acclaimed roles in Jai Shri Krishna (2008–09) as Shri Krishna, as Abhimanyu in Suryaputra Karn, and Kartikeya in Mahakali – Anth Hi Aarambh Hai.

He has also acted in many films including Zor Lagaa Ke...Haiya! and Ramaa: The Saviour.

== Early life ==
Meghan was born on 7 June 1992, in Mumbai. He is a history graduate, he also has a master's degree in literature from KC College, Mumbai.

== Personal life ==
On 17 November 2025, Jadhav married his Rang Majha Vegla's co-star, Anushka Pimputkar.

== Career ==
Meghan started his career as Krishna in Jai Shri Krishna and is also known for his role as Gyan in Sony's Saas Bina Sasuraal. He has also played Abhimanyu in the mythological serial of Sony Entertainment Television (India), Suryaputra Karn. He portrayed the role of Kartikey in Mahakali– Anth hi Aarambh hai and gained immense popularity for his role. He also starred as Aaditya in Yeh Un Dinon Ki Baat Hai which is still remembered by fans, as Govind in Tenali Rama and as Madhavdas in Vighnaharta Ganesh. He won the Best Debut Actor Award at the Marathi Film Festival Awards for his performance in the Marathi film 'Chahto Mi Tula' (2016).

== Filmography ==
=== Television ===
Year	Title	Role	Language	Notes
2006	Raavan	Elder Vibhishana	Hindi	
2009	Jai Shri Krishna	Krishna	Hindi	
2009	Dharti Ka Veer Yodha Prithviraj Chauhan	Dheer	Hindi	
2010	Tere Liye	Subodh	Hindi	
2010–2012	Saas Bina Sasural	Gyan Prakash Chaturvedi	Hindi	
2014	Buddha	Prince Nand	Hindi	
2015	Mooh Boli Shaadi	Akhil Tiwari	Hindi	
2016	Suryaputra Karn	Abhimanyu	Hindi	
2017	Hoshiyar… Sahi Waqt, Sahi Kadam	Harshvardhan	Hindi	
2017–2018	Mahakali — Anth Hi Aarambh Hai	Kartikeya	Hindi	
2018	Tenali Rama	Govind	Hindi	
2018–2019	RadhaKrishn	Vyomasaur	Hindi	
2019	Tantra	Parth Khanna	Hindi	
2019	Yeh Un Dinon Ki Baat Hai	Aditya Gadkari	Hindi	
2019–2020	Shubharambh	Utsav Dave	Hindi	
2020	Tera Yaar Hoon Main	Swapnil Agarwal	Hindi	
2021	Vighnaharta Ganesh	Madhavdas	Hindi	
2021–2022	Thodasa Badal Thodasa Paani	Randeep Mukherjee (Apu)	Hindi	
2022	Anandibaa Aur Emily	Krishna	Hindi	
2023	Rang Majha Vegla	Aryan	Marathi	
2023	Jyoti... Umeedon Se Sajee	Rajan	Hindi	
2024	Qayaamat Se Qayaamat Tak	Chirag	Hindi	
2025–present	Lakshmi Niwas	Jayant Kanitkar	Marathi	

=== Special appearances ===
Year	Title	Role	Channels
2012	Savdhaan India	Sanish Shirke (Episode 120)	Life OK
2013	Savdhaan India	Sanjay (Episode 352)	Life OK
2013	Savdhaan India	Amit Srivastav (Episode 496)	Life OK
2014	Savdhaan India	Sunny Khurana (Episode 636)	Life OK
2013	Fear Files: Darr Ki Sacchi Tasvirein	Vinay Sharma (Episode 73)	Zee TV
2013	Adaalat - Roller Coaster Par Murder : Part 1 & 2	Vicky Mehra (Episode 205 & Episode 206)	SET
2013	MTV Webbed	Jai Mishra (Episode 5)	MTV
2014	Pyaar Tune Kya Kiya	Shankar (Season 1 - Episode 7)	Zing
2014	SuperCops vs Supervillains - Most Wanted	Mayo (Episode 12)	Life OK
2015	Crime Patrol - Apaharan	Vishal Surve (Episode 518 - Episode 520-other episodes too)	SET
2016	C.I.D. - Pyaar Ki Jung	Rishi (Episode 1371)	SET
2019	Laal Ishq - Kiwaad Bhoot	Shashwat (Episode 88)	&TV
2022	Anandibaa Aur Emily	Lord Krishna	StarPlus
2023	Taarak Mehta Ka Ooltah Chashmah	Lord Krishna	Sony SAB

=== Web series ===
Year	Title	Role	Notes
2024	Adrishyam – The Invisible Heroes	Kabeer	

=== Films ===
Year	Title	Role	Notes
2005	Salam		
2006	Nana Mama	Rahul	
2006	Bandu Boxer	Bandu	
2007	Salaam Bacche	Rahul Mehta	
2009	Zor Lagaa Ke...Haiya!	Karan	
2010	Ramaa: The Saviour	Rohan	
2015	Brothers	Teenager David	
2016	Chahto Mi Tula	Vivek	
