= Biwi, Malawi =

Biwi
- Populated Place
- Country: Malawi
- Region: Central
- District: Lilongwe
- Elevation: 1,276 m (4,186 ft)

Biwi is a populated place in Lilongwe District, Central Region, Malawi. Biwi is 31 km (19 mi) away from the capital of the district, region, and country of Lilongwe.

== Geography ==
Nearby places of Biwi are: Bisai, Khombe, Mkwela, Mkwiche, and Mpango.
