= Shruti Bhist =

Indian film and television actress

- Born: 22 January 2003 (age 23); Pauri Garhwal Uttrakhand, India
- Occupation: Actress
- Years active: 2011–present

Shruti Bhist (born 22 January 2003) is an Indian film and television actress. She played Ira in Ek Nayi Chhoti Si Zindagi. In 2011, she appeared in the television serial Hitler Didi as Indu. She also played as Saloni in the fairy adventure comedy series Baal Veer on SAB TV. She also appeared in famous web series The Family Man as Mahima.

== Early life ==
Bhist was born on 22 January 2003 in Pauri Garhwal Uttrakhand, India. In 2013, she completed her fifth grade at St. Lawrence High School, as one of the top three on her class.

== Television ==
Year	Title	Role	Notes	Ref(s)
2011	Ek Nayi Chhoti Si Zindagi	Ira		
2011–12	Chintu Chinki Aur Ek Badi Si Love Story	Khushi		
2012–13	Hitler Didi	Indu Kumar		
2012	Phir Subah Hogi	Sugni Niwas		
2013	Saath Nibhaana Saathiya	Maya		
2013–2014	Arjun	Anjali		
2014–2016	Baal Veer	Saloni		
2017–2018	Vani Rani	Mishti		
2020	Mere Sai - Shraddha Aur Saburi	Sumati		
2021	Pandya Store	Keerti Seth		
2022	Swaraj	Rani Abbakka's daughter		
2024	Mishri	Mishri Sharma	Lead Role	
2025–2026	Noyontara	Noyontara "Noyon" Sengupta	Double role	
2026	Noyontara	Noyontara "Tara" Sengupta Basu	Double role	

=== Web series ===
Year	Title	Role
2021	Out of Love (Season 2)	Gayatri
2021	The Family man (Season 2)	Mahima
2023	The Trial	Ananya Sengupta

== Filmography ==
Year	Title	Role
2014	Rajjo	Young Rajjo
2014	Bangg	
2021	Radhe	
