= Jiya Shankar =

Indian actress (born 1995)

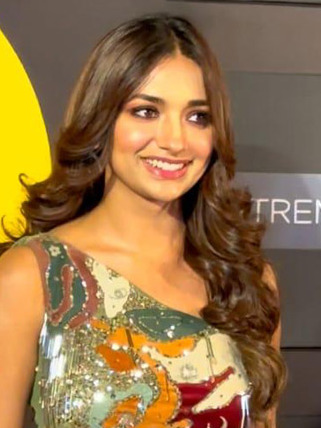
- Jiya in 2023
- Born: Jiya Shankar; 17 April 1995 (age 31); Mumbai, Maharashtra, India
- Occupation: Actress
- Years active: 2013–present
- Height: 5 ft 4 in (163 cm)

Jiya Shankar is an Indian actress. She is known for playing Dr. Ira Pandey on &TV's comedy drama series Meri Hanikarak Biwi and Susheela Ruhail Solanki on SAB TV's comedy series Kaatelal & Sons. She also appeared in the 2022 Marathi-language film Ved. She played the protagonist in the Colors TV supernatural drama Pishachini.

She has also appeared as a co-host of Good Night India on SAB TV. She also participated in Bigg Boss OTT 2 as a contestant, and was evicted on Day 54, three days before the grand finale.

== Early life ==
Shankar was born in Mumbai, Maharashtra. Her mother is Surekha Gavli. Her parents divorced when she was 13. She revealed in Bigg Boss OTT 2 that 'Shankar' is not her father's name, but a last name she took for herself.

== Career ==
Shankar made her acting debut in 2013, in Telugu film named Entha Andanga Unnave starring alongside Ajay Manthena. Later in 2017, she appeared in a Tamil film named Kanavu Variyam opposite Arun Chidambaram. Shankar made her television debut, in 2015, as Alisha Rai with Bindass's Love by Chance opposite Karan Singhmar. Shankar made her first television outbreak, in 2016, by playing one of the leads Shreya Dixit Rathore in & TV's Queens Hain Hum.

Shankar was recently playing the role of Susheela Ruhail Solanki opposite Paras Arora in SAB TV's Kaatelal & Sons. In August 2022, she played the role of Pavitra opposite Harsh Rajput in Colors TV show Pishachini.

She was recently seen starring as Nisha Katkar in Ved alongside Ritesh Deshmukh and Genelia Deshmukh. As of January 2023, the romantic thriller drama movie had collected ₹75 crore at the box office. She received recognition for her moving acting skills, and being a fresh face in the Marathi film industry. In June 2023, Shankar has participated in the game reality show Bigg Boss OTT 2 and finished at 6th position.

== Filmography ==
=== Films ===
List of film credits
Year	Title	Role	Language	Ref.
2013	Entha Andanga Unnave	Jiya	Telugu	
2017	Kanavu Variyam	Veena	Tamil	
2018	Hyderabad Love Story	Vaishnavi	Telugu	
2022	Ved	Nisha Katkar	Marathi	
2026	Kadhal Reset Repeat	Aditi	Tamil	

=== Television ===
List of television credits
Year	Title	Role	Notes	Ref.
2015	Gumrah: End of Innocence	Sonam	Season 4	
2015	MTV Big F	Ahana Sethia	Season 1; Episode 4	
2017	Pyaar Tune Kya Kiya	Nancy		
2017–2019	Meri Hanikarak Biwi	Dr. Iravati "Ira" Desai Pandey		
2020	Laal Ishq	Suhani	Episode 219: "Chamgadar Pret"	
2020–2021	Kaatelal & Sons	Susheela "Sattu" Kaatelal Ruhail Solanki		
2022	Goodnight India	Host		
2022–2023	Pishachini	Pavithra "Piku" Bose Singh Rajput		
2023	Bigg Boss OTT 2	Contestant	6th place	

=== Web series ===
List of web series credits
Year	Title	Role	Ref.
2020	Virgin Bhasskar 2	Pakhi	

=== Music videos ===
List of music video credits
Year	Title	Singer(s)	Ref.
2023	"Judaiyaan"	Tanveer Evan	
2024	"Meri Zindagi"	Tulsi Kumar, Vishal Mishra	
2025	"Bas Tera Hoon"	Asees Kaur, Abhijeet Shrivastava	

== Awards and nominations ==
Year	Award	Category	Work	Result	Ref.
2022	Filmfare Awards Marathi	Best Debut Actor – Female	Ved	Nominated	
2023	Indian Television Academy Awards	Best Actress Comedy - TV	Good Night India	Nominated	

== See also ==
- List of Hindi television actresses
- List of Indian television actresses
