= Paras Arora =

Indian television actor (born 1994)

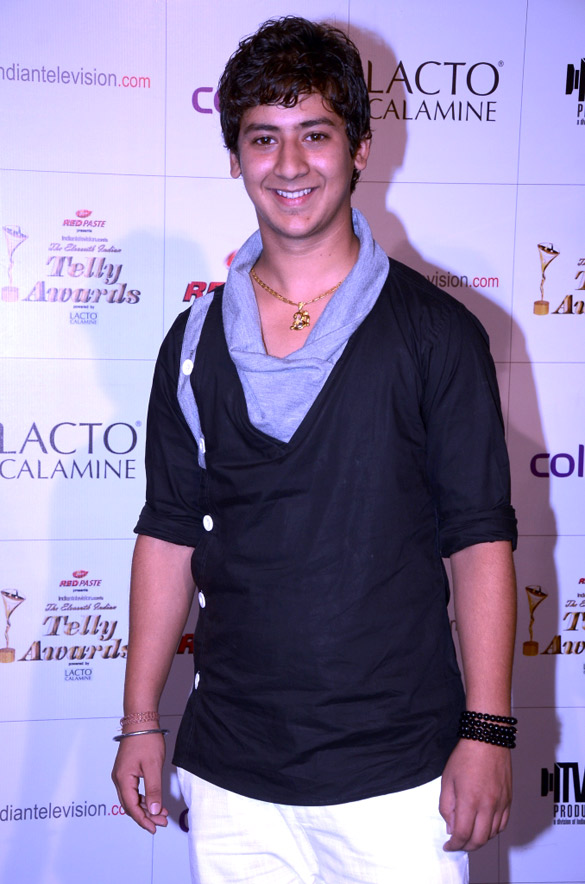
- Born: 10 January 1994 (age 32)
- Occupation: Actor
- Years active: 2004–present
- Notable work: Veer Shivaji; Mahabharat; Udaan

Paras Arora is an Indian actor who works in Hindi-language television shows and films. He is best known for portraying the character of Junior Chhatrapati Shivaji Maharaj in Veer Shivaji, Abhimanyu in Mahabharat and Vivan Rajvanshi in Udann.

== Filmography ==
=== Films ===
Year	Title	Role	Notes
2004	Yuva	Arvind Balachandran	
2009	Let's Dance	Kallu	
2013	Rajjo	Chandu	
2018	Captain Nawab	Unnamed	Cameo appearance

=== Television ===
Year	Serial	Role	Notes	Ref.
2006	Raavan	Child Laxman		
2008	Ramayan	Young Ram		
2009	Meera			
2009	Jai Maa Durga			
2012	Veer Shivaji	Chatrapati Shivaji		
2014	Mahabharat	Abhimanyu		
2014	Maharakshak: Aryan	Aseem		
2014	Pyaar Tune Kya Kiya			
2014	Savdhaan India			
2015	Police Factory	Cadet Rahul		
2016–2018	Udaan	Vivaan Rajvanshi		
2017	MTV Webbed	Raunak Thakur	Season 2; Episode 20	
2018	Dil Hi Toh Hai	Vikrant Raheja		
2018	Laal Ishq	Karan	Episode 41	
2019	Baavle Utaavle	Guddu		
2020	Dil Hi Toh Hai 3	Vikrant Raheja		
2020–2021	Kaatelal & Sons	Dr. Pramod Chautala		
2022	Brij Ke Gopal	Krishna		
2022–2023	Dil Diyaan Gallaan	Dr. Veer Dungarpal		
2024–2025	Gehna - Zewar Ya Zanjeer	Ayushmaan Jaisingh		
2025–2026	Gharwali Pedwali	Jeetu Pandey		

=== Music videos ===
Year	Title	Singer(s)	Language	Ref.
2014	Kachichiyan	Savvy Sandhu	Punjabi	
2014	Tu Mera Dil	Falak	Hindi	
2014	Mud Aaja Soniye	Nikis	Hindi	
2017	Piya Saaware	Bornali Kalita, Saket Singh	Hindi	
2020	Bhulaa De	Lakshay, Showkidd	Hindi	
2021	Rab Ne Jo Pucha	Raj Barman	Hindi	
2022	Tu Baithe Mere Samne	Raj Barman	Hindi	
2022	Paani Na Samajh	Raj Barman	Hindi	
2022	Dil Se Utar Gaye	Raj Barman	Hindi	
2022	Jitna Tujhe Chahte Hai Hum	Raj Barman	Hindi	
