= Rajjo =

2013 Indian film by Vishwas Patil

- Directed by: Vishwas Patil
- Written by: Vishwas Patil
- Produced by: U.A. Karande
- Starring: Kangana Ranaut; Paras Arora; Prakash Raj; Mahesh Manjrekar
- Cinematography: Binod Pradhan
- Edited by: Rajesh Rao
- Music by: Uttam Singh
- Production company: Four Pillars Entertainment
- Release date: 15 November 2013
- Country: India
- Language: Hindi

Rajjo is a 2013 Indian Hindi-language romantic comedy film written and directed by Vishwas Patil. It stars Kangana Ranaut and Paras Arora in lead roles along with a supporting cast of Prakash Raj, Mahesh Manjrekar and Jaya Prada. The film was released in on 15 November 2013. Upon release, the film received highly negative reviews and was declared a flop.

== Synopsis ==
Rajjo tells the story of a nautch girl in the most extraordinary circumstances. Rajjo and Chandu fall in love against the backdrop of dying Kothas in Mumbai, which nurtured the traditional art of singing and dancing for years.

== Cast ==
- Kangana Ranaut as Rajjo
- Paras Arora as Chandu
- Prakash Raj as Govind Hande
- Mahesh Manjrekar as Begum
- Jaya Prada as Janidevi
- Deepika Amin as Kamladevi
- Avtar Gill as Acharya Deshbhushan
- Kishor Kadam as Daadi Patil
- Upendra Limaye as Inspector Salunkhe
- Shivani Rawat as Sakina, Salunkhe's wife
- Vipin Sharma as Chandu's father
- Shashank Shende as Gannewala
- Dalip Tahil as Lala Pathan
- Shruti Bisht as Young Rajjo

== Production ==
Kangana Ranaut did extensive research in order to prepare for her role. She visited Kothas and met with many women to understand their body language and mindset.

A large set was created in the neighbourhood of Kamathipura in Mumbai under the supervision of production designer Muneesh Sappel.

The music for the film was composed by Uttam Singh at Abbey Road Studios in London.

== Soundtrack ==
Uttam Singh composed the film's music, with the lyrics being written by Sameer and Dev Kohli.

No.	Title	Artist(s)	Length
1.	"Jhulmi Re Jhulmi"	Bela Shende	4:59
2.	"Mere Dil Ki Train"	Shaan	4:46
3.	"Kaise Milun Mein Piyaa"	Javed Ali, Bela Shende	6:53
4.	"Kaleja Hai Hazir"	Bela Shende	4:29
5.	"Mere Ghoongru"	Javed Ali, Bela Shende	7:13
6.	"Ye Kothe Ye Ghoongru"	Shubha Joshi	1:21
7.	"Bille Ke Jabde Mein"	Mumbai Voices	1:16
8.	"Theme of Rajjo"		3:21
