= National Science Film Festival and Competition =

Annual film festival

National Science Film Festival and Competition 2019
- Location: Chandigarh, India
- Awards: Golden Beaver Award; Silver Beaver Award; Bronze Beaver Award
- Festival date: 27 January 2019 - 31 January 2019
- Language: International
- Website: vigyanprasar.gov.in/9th-national-science-film-festival-of-india

Science Film Festival of India
- 8th National Science Film Festival of India

National Science Film Festival and Competition(Rashtriya Vigyan Chalchitra Mela) is organised by Vigyan Prasar, the Indian Department of Science and Technology in collaboration with Jahangirabad Media Institute as a part of the Indian Science Congress 2011. It is open to individual producers as well as production houses.

== Objective ==
The festival is an initiative of Vigyan Prasar and the Government of India to promote science films in India. Science filmmaking is not a developed field in India compared to many other developed countries. The festival is meant to bring attention towards the need of quality science film making in the country.

== Awards ==
- Category A: Films made by government and non-government institutions / organisations
- Category B: Films made by individual / independent film makers
- Category C: Films made by students pursuing degree / diploma level courses
- Category D: Films made by students studying in class 6th to 12th
- Technical Excellence Awards
- Special Jury Awards

== Winners of National Science Film Festival 2019 ==
Winners of the National Science Film Festival 2019

Category 'Rainbow': Films made by School Students

- Winner Golden Beaver Award: Automating Agriculture Directed by Rishu Tiwari
- Silver Beaver Award: Everyone is Unique Directed by Alina Nakshbandi
- Bronze Beaver Award: Accessible Light Directed by Ananya Jain
