= Meri Hanikarak Biwi =

- Genre: Comedy; Drama; Romance
- Created by: Sonali Jaffar
- Directed by: Sanjay Satavase
- Creative director: Yakshi Burathoki Ajay Bhardwaj
- Starring: Karan Suchak; Jiya Shankar
- Country of origin: India
- Original language: Hindi
- No. of seasons: 1
- No. of episodes: 524

Production
- Producer: Sonali Jaffer
- Editor: Sameer Gandhi
- Camera setup: Multi camera
- Running time: 21 Minutes
- Production company: Full House Media

Original release
- Network: &TV
- Release: 4 December 2017 – 13 December 2019

Meri Hanikarak Biwi (English: My Toxic Wife) is an Indian drama series that aired on &TV from 2017 to 2019. The show is about Akhilesh (Karan Suchak), a village simpleton whose world turns upside-down when his doctor fiancée (Jiya Shankar) accidentally performs a vasectomy on him before their wedding. The show completed 100 episodes in April 2018.

== Plot ==
This show revolves around the life of two completely different individuals, Akilesh Pandey (Karan Suchak) and Iravati aka Ira Desai (Jiya Shankar). Akilesh is a village simpleton and an ardent follower of Bajrang Bali (Lord Hanuman). He is illiterate, but a great wrestler, while Ira is an aspiring medical student. Destiny had meant these two individuals to meet and unite. They meet in Akilesh's hometown Banaras; but things go astray when Ira unknowingly performs a vasectomy on Akilesh. Akilesh and his mother Pushpa Pandey (Sucheta Khanna) are devastated after this great loss. Their situation worsens when Akilesh's stepmother Devina Pandey (Anjali Mukhi) and his stepsiblings Bhoomi, Aditya and Siddhi spread the news of Akilesh's vasectomy operation everywhere. Pushpa is heartbroken as she desperately wanted him to get married and have a family of his own. Ira, after being guilt-ridden over the disaster she brought into Akilesh and Puspha's lives, decides to marry Akilesh to relieve Puspha. They plan to divorce each other once Ira arranges for Akhilesh's vasectomy reversal surgery. After their marriage, Akilesh and Ira are slowly drawn to each other as each of them helps the other exit difficult situations and slowly fall in love. Pushpa soon learns that it was Ira who had performed Akilesh's vasectomy but forgives her, hoping that Akilesh will soon be blessed with children when his operation is reversed. However, Ira discovers that Akilesh's case of vasectomy is so complicated that it can be never reversed, but there is a ray of hope when she learns that Akilesh's semen sample was preserved. Ira soon undergoes artificial insemination and waits for positive results. At that moment, Pushpa falls miserably sick due to an evil ploy manipulated by Devina and her son Aditya. When the doctors are unable to improve Puspha's condition, Akilesh decides to take her to the local village baba, while Ira learns that she is pregnant. The baba saves Pushpa's life and in return he asks for Akilesh's child. Akilesh, thinking that he can never become a father, promises to give his child to baba. Ira becomes sad as she does not want to separate from her child. She leaves Akilesh and the bus in which she was travelling meets with an accident, the whole family believes Ira to be dead.

=== 5 years later ===
Akilesh, after being separated from Ira, becomes a rough and tough person. He is well educated now and a successful businessman. On the other hand, Ira is a village doctor living with her and Akilesh's daughter Mishri (Vaishnavi Prajapati). After many trials and tribulations (Kunika, Mirchi), Akilesh and Ira are united with Mishri. But unfortunately, a terrorist lookalike of Ira appears. Akilesh, while trying to save everyone, shoots her. Mishri and Akhilesh are heartbroken thinking Ira to be dead. Pushpa's mental state also is disrupted due to this shock, and she becomes mentally unstable.

=== 3 months later ===
The Panday house has the entry of a new villain, Kabir. He wants to destroy Akilesh and, in an attempt, to do so, he forces Akilesh to marry his sister Mira (Shruti Kanwar). However, Kabir has other ulterior motives, his actual target is Mishri whose heart matches with the heart of his daughter who needs a heart transplant. Ira, now disguised as Amaya (Kabir's wife), soon learns about Kabir's evil ploys and foils all his plans with the help of Akilesh. Akilesh, Ira and Mishri are united once again. Then Akilesh and Ira discover about Chuttan (Gauransh Sharma) lives; Chuttan is Akilesh and Ira's son and Mishri's twin brother, separated from Ira at birth. They find out Chuttan's whereabouts and bring him home, since Chuttan is unable to forget his adoptive parents, they allow him to stay with them. After Chuttan's departure, Ira performs Akilesh's reverse vasectomy. After, the surgery, Akhilesh's libido hormones increase leading to his attractions to the opposite sex. However, with the help of Akilesh's ardent belief in Lord Hanuman, he overcomes the attractions due to the side effects of reversevasectomy. After, overcoming innumerable hurdles in Mumbai, Akilesh decides to shift to his home village Banaras to lead a serene and tranquil life. So, the show ends on a happy note with Akhilesh and his complete family returning to Banaras.

== Cast ==
=== Main ===
- Karan Suchak as Akhilesh Pandey – Pushpa and Brijesh's son; Devina's stepson; Adi, Siddhi and Bhoomi's half-brother; Ira's husband; Mira's former husband; Chuttan and Mishri's father (2017–2019)
- Jiya Shankar as Dr. Iravati "Ira" Desai Pandey – Ballabh's daughter; Bhavik's sister; Akhilesh's first wife; Chuttan and Mishri's mother (2017–2019)

=== Recurring ===
- Nasirr Khan as Brijesh Pandey – Pushpa and Devina's husband; Akhilesh, Adi, Siddhi and Bhoomi's father; Chuttan, Vansh and Mishri's grandfather (2017–2018)
- Ashish Kapoor as Dr. Rajat Sareen (cameo) (2018) (episode 146-168)
- Vaishnavi Prajapati as Mishri Pandey – Akhilesh and Ira's daughter; Chuttan's twin sister (2018–2019)
- Sucheta Khanna as Pushpa Dwivedi Pandey – Brijesh's first wife; Akhilesh's mother; Chuttan and Mishri's grandmother (2017–2019)
- Anjali Mukhi as Devina Kaul Pandey – Brijesh's second wife; Akhilesh's stepmother; Adi, Siddhi and Bhoomi's mother (2017–2019)
- Kunal Sheth as Chandu - Pushpa's nephew; Akhilesh's cousin
- Gauransh Sharma as Chuttan Pandey – Akhilesh and Ira's son; Mishri's twin brother; Chanda's adopted son (2019)
- Rajeshwari Datta as Chanda – Chuttan's adoptive mother (2019)
- Ashish Kapoor as Dr. Rajat Sareen (cameo) (2018) (episode 146-168)
- Mamta Kapoor as Kamla Rane (2019)
- Shruti Kanwar as Mira Sisodia Pandey – Kabir's sister; Akhilesh's third wife (2019)
- Rahulram Manchanda as Kabir Singh Sisodia – Mira's brother; Ira's former fiancé (2019)
- Tanvi Thakkar as Kunika Khanna Pandey – Akhilesh's business partner/second wife (2018–2019)
- Praneet Bhat as Aghori Baba (2018)
- Palak Purswani/Anuradha Khaira as Bhoomi Pandey Desai – Devina and Brijesh's daughter; Bhavik's wife; Adi and Siddhi's sister; Akhilesh's half-sister (2017–2019)
- Lakshay Khurana as Aditya "Adi" Pandey – Devina and Brijesh's son; Siddhi and Bhoomi's brother; Akhilesh's half-brother (2017–2019)
- Sonal Bhojwani as Siddhi Pandey – Devina and Brijesh's daughter; Adi and Bhoomi's sister; Akhilesh's half-sister; Vansh's mother (2017–2019)
- Raju Shrestha as Ballabh Desai – Bhavik and Ira's father; Chuttan and Mishri's maternal grandfather (2017–2018)
- Hetal Puniwala as Lakhan Dwivedi – Pushpa's brother (2017–2018)
- Mohit Nain as Karan (2019)
- Sayantani Ghosh as Neerja Srivastava – Gulki's sister; Akhilesh's college teacher (cameo) (2018)
- Neetha Shetty as Gulki Srivastava – Neerja's sister (cameo) (2018)
- Arshi Khan (cameo) (2018)
- Anoop Kumar Rungta as Advocate Shivesh Sarna (cameo) (2018)
- Roslyn D'Souza (cameo) (2018)
- Samreen Wazeer as Superna (cameo) (2018)
- Dipali Sharma as Sanaya Singhania, Aditya's girlfriend (2018)
- Sid Mahajan as Bhavik Desai – Ira's brother, Bhoomi's husband
- Suman Rana as Tanya Pandey – Aditya's wife, Devina's daughter-in-law (2019)
