= Deepika Singh =

Indian actress (born 1989)

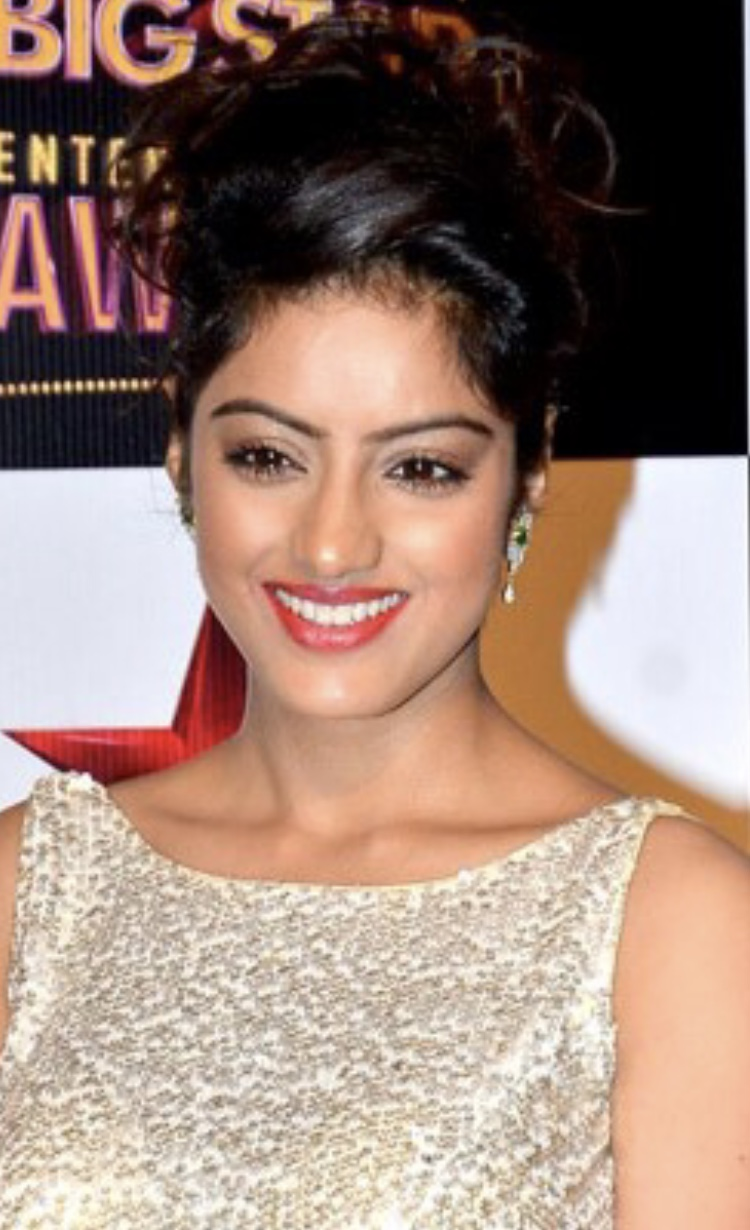
- Singh in 2014
- Born: 26 July 1989 (age 37); New Delhi, India
- Other name: Deepika Singh Goyal
- Education: Punjab Technical University, (MBA)
- Occupation: Actress
- Years active: 2011–present
- Known for: Diya Aur Baati Hum; Mangal Lakshmi
- Spouse: Rohit Raj Goyal (m. 2014)
- Children: 1
- Awards: Full list

Deepika Singh (born 26 July 1989) is an Indian actress who primarily works in Hindi television. She is recognised for her portrayal of IPS Sandhya Kothari Rathi in Diya Aur Baati Hum, which earned her the ITA Award for Best Actress - Popular. She made her Hindi film debut with Titu Ambani and is also known for portraying Mangal Srivastav in Mangal Lakshmi.

== Early life ==
Singh was born on 26 July 1989, in New Delhi. She completed her Master's in Business Administration in Marketing at Punjab Technical University.

== Career ==
Singh in 2013

Singh made her television debut with Diya Aur Baati Hum, where she played IPS Sandhya Kothari Rathi opposite Anas Rashid. She played the character from 2011 to 2016. The series earned her several awards including ITA Award for Best Actress - Popular and Indian Telly Award for Best Actress in a Lead Role. It proved to be a breakthrough in her career.

Following a hiatus, Singh returned to television in 2019. She played dual roles of Sandhya Patwardhan Jindal and Sakshi Patwardhan Salgaonkar opposite Namik Paul and Vin Rana, in Kavach... Mahashivrati. In the same year, she played Advocate Aamna Sayed in the web series Halala.

In 2022, Singh made her film debut with Titu Ambani opposite Tushar Pandey. Rachana Dubey of The Times of India noted, "Deepika Singh puts out an honest, frill-and-fuss-free performance."

From February 2024 to June 2026, Singh is seen portraying Mangal Srivastav Saxena opposite Naman Shaw in Mangal Lakshmi. Since October 2026, she was a contestant in Colors TV's Dhammal with Pati Patni Aur Panga – Jodiyon Ka Reality Check with her husband.

== Personal life ==
Singh married director Rohit Raj Goyal on 2 May 2014. Following her marriage, she changed her name to Deepika Singh Goyal. In January 2017, she announced her pregnancy. In May 2017, Singh gave birth to their son and took a brief break from acting. Singh has also been trained in the classical Odissi dance form.

== Filmography ==
=== Film ===
| Year | Title | Role | Language | Notes | Ref. |
|---|---|---|---|---|---|
| 1995 | Dhee Jatt Di | Raano | Punjabi | Child artist | |
| 2001 | Sikandera | Rani | Punjabi | Child artist | |
| 2014 | Work Weather Wife | Kashish | Punjabi | | |
| 2022 | Women's Day Out | Preeti | Hindi | Short film | |
| 2022 | Titu Ambani | Moushumi | Hindi | | |

=== Television ===
| Year | Title | Role | Notes | Ref. |
|---|---|---|---|---|
| 2011–2016 | Diya Aur Baati Hum | IPS Sandhya Kothari Rathi | | |
| 2014 | Box Cricket League | Contestant | Season 1 | |
| 2019 | Kitchen Champion 5 | Contestant | | |
| 2019 | Box Cricket League | Contestant | Season 4 | |
| 2019 | Kavach... Mahashivratri | Sandhya Patwardhan Jindal | | |
| 2019 | Kavach... Mahashivratri | Sakshi Patwardhan Salgaonkar | | |
| 2024–2026 | Mangal Lakshmi | Mangal Srivastav | | |
| 2026–present | Dhammal with Pati Patni Aur Panga – Jodiyon Ka Reality Check | Contestant | Season 2 | |

==== Special appearances ====
| Year | Title | Role | Ref. |
|---|---|---|---|
| 2011 | Zindagi Ka Har Rang....Gulaal | Sandhya Kothari Rathi | |
| 2011 | Iss Pyaar Ko Kya Naam Doon? | Sandhya Kothari Rathi | |
| 2011 | Ruk Jaana Nahin | Sandhya Kothari Rathi | |
| 2012 | Ek Hazaaron Mein Meri Behna Hai | Sandhya Kothari Rathi | |
| 2012 | Mann Kee Awaaz Pratigya | Sandhya Kothari Rathi | |
| 2012; 2016 | Yeh Rishta Kya Kehlata Hai | Sandhya Kothari Rathi | |
| 2012 | Nach Baliye 5 | Herself | |
| 2013 | Nach Baliye 6 | Herself | |
| 2014 | Yeh Hai Mohabbatein | Sandhya Kothari Rathi | |
| 2015 | Tu Mera Hero | Sandhya Kothari Rathi | |
| 2015 | Tere Sheher Mein | Sandhya Kothari Rathi | |
| 2015 | Comedy Classes | Sandhya Kothari Rathi | |
| 2016 | Saath Nibhaana Saathiya | Sandhya Kothari Rathi | |
| 2017 | Tu Sooraj, Main Saanjh Piyaji | Sandhya Kothari Rathi | |
| 2020 | Ghum Hai Kisikey Pyaar Mein | Sandhya Kothari Rathi | |
| 2021 | Shubh Laabh - Aapkey Ghar Mein | Herself | |
| 2022 | Kumkum Bhagya | Herself | |
| 2024 | Dance Deewane 4 | Mangal Srivastav | |
| 2024 | Suhaagan | Mangal Srivastav | |
| 2024 | Mishri | Mangal Srivastav | |
| 2026 | Mannat - Har Khushi Paane Ki | Mangal Srivastav | |
| 2026 | Mangal Lakshmi | Herself | |

=== Web series ===
| Year | Title | Role | Notes | Ref. |
|---|---|---|---|---|
| 2019 | Halala | Advocate Aamna Sayed | Ullu's series | |

=== Music videos ===
| Year | Title | Singer | Ref. |
|---|---|---|---|
| 2023 | Tum Toh Aise Na They | Javed Ali | |

== See also ==
- List of Hindi television actresses
- List of Indian television actresses
