= Saas v/s Bahu =

- Created by: Swastik Pictures
- Presented by: Karan Fredrich Mehra
- Country of origin: India
- No. of episodes: 38

Production
- Running time: 52 minutes

Original release
- Network: Sahara One
- Release: 25 August – 28 October 2008

Saas v/s Bahu is an Indian dance television series that aired on Sahara One channel in 2008.

== Concept ==
Saas v/s Bahu is a dance competition between the Saases (mothers-in-law) and the Bahus (daughters-in-law) from some of the most popular Indian television series. The show was hosted by a television actor Karan Mehra. The 'saases' and 'bahus' will be scored a number out of 10 by the judges, Aruna Irani and Longinus Fernandes (Longie). Each week there was six contestants (three saases and three bahus) who will be competing with each other.

The top score the contestants can receive is 30 (20 from the judges and 10 from the audiences).

== Performances ==
The first day the contestants are to do a solo performance, the second day they are assigned a partner to dance with, and the last day will be when the "bahus" will dance with their "saases" but get different scores and the teams will do their triplets. The team who wins the week will be in the quarter-finals but they must be valued to be in it. On Mondays the contestants will do their solo performance. Tuesdays the contestants partner comes and does their solo performance. Wednesday the contestants and partner will do their doubles performance. Thursdays are when the saas and bahu dance together but they score separately and they will do their triplets. Fridays they will show the saas and bahu in the drawing room practicing for their big performance!

=== Quarter-finals ===
In the quarter-finals the rules are little different. The contestants will dance to a song by an actor for solos. Then for the round which the contestant and partner dance together, they will dance on a certain genre, salsa or folk or rock and roll. The saas and bahu will do the same time. For the saas vs bahu round, one of them will dance an instrumental if the team thinks they are the best out of the three. The team who wins the week will be in the semifinals but they must be valued for it.

=== Semifinals ===
In the semifinals the rules are different from quarter-finals and on the regular basis. In the semifinal there are 12 contestants, six saases and six bahus. Only four can go in the Grand Finale from each team. Teammates vote their own teammates out after seeing their performance and scores. The semifinal spend two days for solo performances (about two, three or four a day). But here the rules are different. The contestants do not bring a partner: They just go and dance with their saas or bahus. But it is the impersonation round for them so one of them will dress up as a man and one of them as a woman. As always they will get the scores separately. On Friday, so they show the drawing room for all that has happened. Then the next week the saas and bahu will do their triplets (two a day so it ended on Tuesday). On Tuesday they did the vote out. For the next two days they showed who is in the Grand Finale and some of their performances and on Friday they show the drawing room for the triplets.

== Contestants ==
Name (Saas)	Serial	Name (Bahu)	Week Number	Quarter-final	Semifinal	Grand Finale
Himani Shivpuri	Ghar Ek Sapnaa	Lata Sabharwal	Week 3	Red X symbol	Red X symbol	Red X symbol
Jayati Bhatia	Viraasat	Chhavi Mittal	Week 2	Green checkmark	Green checkmark	Green checkmark
Kishori Shahane	Solhah Singaarr	Keerti Gaekwad Kelkar	Week 5	Green checkmark	Green checkmark	Green checkmark
Krutika Desai Khan	Aisa Des Hai Mera	Saumya Tandon	Week 4	Green checkmark	Green checkmark	Green checkmark
Mahru Sheikh	Doli Saja Ke	Barkha Bisht	Week 1	Red X symbol	Red X symbol	Red X symbol
Neelam Mehra	Woh Rehne Waali Mehlon Ki	Reena Kapoor	Week 5	Green checkmark	Green checkmark	Red X symbol
Pratichi Mishra	Saat Phere: Saloni Ka Safar	Aanchal Dwiwedi	Week 1	Red X symbol	Red X symbol	Red X symbol
Seema Kapoor	Sapna Babul Ka...Bidaai	Preeti Puri	Week 4	Green checkmark	Red X symbol	Red X symbol
Shoma Anand	Bhabhi	Rucha Gujrati	Week 3	Red X symbol	Red X symbol	Red X symbol
Kitu Gidwani	Kulvaddhu	Daljeet Kaur Bhanot	Week 3	Red X symbol	Red X symbol	Red X symbol
Nimisha Vakharia	Teen Bahuraaniyaan	Manava Naik	Week 5	Green checkmark	Red X symbol	Red X symbol
Priya Arya	Kasturi	Amita Chandekar	Week 2	Green checkmark	Green checkmark	Red X symbol
Rita Bhaduri	Kumkum – Ek Pyara Sa Bandhan	Juhi Parmar	Week 1	Red X symbol	Red X symbol	Red X symbol
Vaishnavi Macdonald	K. Street Pali Hill	Jasveer Kaur	Week 4	Green checkmark	Green checkmark	Green checkmark
Kamalika Guha Thakurta	Kyunki Saas Bhi Kabhi Bahu Thi	Shilpa Saklani	Week 2	Green checkmark	Red X symbol	Red X symbol

Name (Bahu)	Serial	Name (Saas)	Week Number	Quarter-Final	Semifinal	Grand Finale
Aanchal Dwiwedi	Saat Phere: Saloni Ka Safar	Pratichi Mishra	Week 1	Green checkmark	Red X symbol	Red X symbol
Barkha Bisht	Doli Saja Ke	Mahru Sheikh	Week 1	Green checkmark	Red X symbol	Red X symbol
Chhavi Mittal	Viraasat	Jayati Bhatia	Week 2	Red X symbol	Red X symbol	Red X symbol
Keerti Gaekwad Kelkar	Solhah Singaarr	Kishori Shahane	Week 5	Green checkmark	Red X symbol	Red X symbol
Lata Sabharwal	Ghar Ek Sapnaa	Himani Shivpuri	Week 3	Green checkmark	Red X symbol	Red X symbol
Preeti Puri	Sapna Babul Ka...Bidaai	Seema Kapoor	Week 4	Red X symbol	Red X symbol	Red X symbol
Reena Kapoor	Woh Rehne Waali Mehlon Ki	Neelam Mehra	Week 5	Red X symbol	Red X symbol	Red X symbol
Rucha Gujrati	Bhabhi	Shoma Anand	Week 3	Green checkmark	Green checkmark	Green checkmark
Shilpa Saklani	Kyunki Saas Bhi Kabhi Bahu Thi	Kamalika Guha Thakurta	Week 2	Green checkmark	Green checkmark	Red X symbol
Amita Chandekar	Kasturi	Priya Arya	Week 2	Red X symbol	Red X symbol	Red X symbol
Daljeet Kaur Bhanot	Kulvaddhu	Kitu Gidwani	Week 3	Green checkmark	Green checkmark	Red X symbol
Jasveer Kaur	K. Street Pali Hill	Vaishnavi Macdonald	Week 4	Green checkmark	Green checkmark	Green checkmark
Juhi Parmar	Kumkum – Ek Pyara Sa Bandhan	Rita Bhaduri	Week 1	Green checkmark	Green checkmark	Green checkmark
Manava Naik	Teen Bahuraaniyaan	Nimisha Vakharia	Week 5	Red X symbol	Red X symbol	Red X symbol
Saumya Tandon	Aisa Des Hai Mera	Krutika Desai Khan	Week 4	Red X symbol	Red X symbol	Red X symbol

== Support ==
Some of the people from Indian television series came to support the teams: Aman Verma, Chetan Hansraj, Hussain Kuwajerwala, Karan Wahi, Mazher Sayed, Naman Shaw, Salil Acharya, Sanjeet Bedi, Sharad Kelkar, Shaleen Bhanot and Sonia Chopra.
