= List of awards and nominations received by Deepika Singh =

Deepika Singh awards and nominations
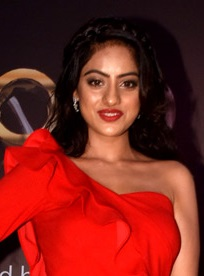
- Singh at Gold Awards, 2019
Awards and nominations
Award	Wins	Nominations

Totals (Note: Certain award groups do not simply award one winner. They acknowledge several different recipients, have runners-up, and have third place. Since this is a specific recognition and is different from losing an award, runner-up mentions are considered wins in this award tally. For simplification and to avoid errors, each award in this list has been presumed to have had a prior nomination.)
- Wins: 5
- Nominations: 10

Deepika Singh is an Indian television actress, known for playing Sandhya Rathi in Diya Aur Baati Hum. Singh has won many award mostly for Diya Aur Baati Hum.

== Indian Television Academy Awards ==
The Indian Television Academy Awards, also known as the (ITA Awards) is an annual event organised by the Indian Television Academy. The awards are presented in various categories, including popular programming (music, news, entertainment, sports, travel, lifestyle and fashion), best television channel in various categories, technical awards, and Best Performance awards.

Year	Category	Show	Character	Result	Ref.
2014	Desh Ki Dhakan	Diya Aur Baati Hum	Sandhya Rathi	Won	
2014	Best Actress (Jury)	Diya Aur Baati Hum	Sandhya Rathi	Nominated	
2018	Most Entertaining Television Actor – Female	Diya Aur Baati Hum	Sandhya Rathi	Nominated	

== Indian Telly Awards ==
The 'Indian Telly Awards' are annual honours presented by the company of Indian Television to persons and organisations in the television industry of India. The Awards are given in several categories such as best programme or series in a specific genre, best television channel in a particular category, most popular actors and awards for technical roles such as writers and directors.

Year	Category	Show	Character	Result	Ref.
2012	Best Actress in a Lead Role	Diya Aur Baati Hum	Sandhya Rathi	Nominated	
2012	Most Popular On-Screen Couple (with Anas Rashid)	Diya Aur Baati Hum	Sandhya Rathi	Nominated	
2012	Best Fresh New Face (Female)	Diya Aur Baati Hum	Sandhya Rathi	Nominated	
2013	Best Onscreen Couple	Diya Aur Baati Hum	Sandhya Rathi	Nominated	
2013	Fan Favorite Actress	Diya Aur Baati Hum	Sandhya Rathi	Won	
2015	Best Onscreen Couple	Diya Aur Baati Hum	Sandhya Rathi	Nominated	
2025	Best Actress in a Lead Role	Mangal Lakshmi	Mangal Srivastav	Won	

== Apsara Awards ==
The Apsara Film & Television Producers Guild Awards are presented annually by members of the Apsara Producers Guild to honour Excellence in film and television.

Year	Category	Show	Character	Result	Ref.
2015	Best Actress in a Drama Series	Diya Aur Baati Hum	Sandhya Rathi	Won	

== Gold Awards ==
The Zee Gold Awards (also known as the Gold Television or Boroplus Awards) are honours presented excellence in the television industry. The Awards are given in several categories.

Year	Category	Show	Character	Result	Ref.
2012	Best Gold Debut (Female)	Diya Aur Baati Hum	Sandhya Rathi	Won	
2013	Best Actor (Female)	Diya Aur Baati Hum	Sandhya Rathi	Nominated	
2013	Most Popular Jodi	Diya Aur Baati Hum	Sandhya Rathi	Nominated	
2015	Best Actor (Female)	Diya Aur Baati Hum	Sandhya Rathi	Nominated	

== Nickelodeon Kids' Choice Awards ==
Year	Category	Show	Character	Result	Ref.
2013	Best TV Character Female	Diya Aur Baati Hum	Sandhya Rathi	Nominated	
