= Zena Edwards =

British poet and performer

- Born: 1960s Hackney, London, England
- Education: Middlesex University; London International School of Performing Arts
- Occupation(s): Poet, performer and multidisciplinary collaborator
- Website: zenaedwards.com

Zena Edwards (born 1960s) is a British writer, poet, performer and multidisciplinary collaborator, who explores her African roots in work that utilises her musical talents. She has performed internationally at festivals, as well as in schools and colleges. She has been described as "one [of] the most unique voices of performance poetry to come out of London".

== Biography ==
Of Caribbean heritage and African descent, she was born in Hackney and brought up in Tottenham, North London, the only child in a single-parent family. She graduated in Drama and Communications studies from Middlesex University and also studied at the London International School of Performing Arts.

Her career as a performance poet spans more than two decades and in her extensive worldwide travels (supported by the British Council, UK Arts International, Apples and Snakes, The Roundhouse and 57 Productions) she has shared a stage with the likes of Linton Kwesi Johnson, Sonia Sanchez, Lemn Sissay, Jean Binta Breeze and Roger McGough, as well as doing other collaborative work including with visual artist Theaster Gates, choreographer Qudus Onikeku and dancer Akram Khan, and has toured with other high-profile names such as Hugh Masekela, The Last Poets and Baba Maal.

Edwards has had commissions from BBC Radio 3 and Radio 4 and from the Birmingham Rep, and for four years was Associate Artist at the Albany Theatre, London. She was Resident Poet at the Poetry Café in Covent Garden, and was shortlisted for the first Arts Foundation Award for Performance Poetry in 2007, winning the Hidden Creatives Award in 2012. She has written and performed three solo shows, Security (2009) — described by Annemarie Kropf as "an absolute tour de force about humanity that bonds us all", and about which Lyn Gardner said in The Guardian: "Edwards is a superb performer, equally at ease as an elderly Caribbean man, as a would-be teenage MC, Ayleen, or as a lonely, 47-year-old Palestinian photographer, Mahmoud" — and in 2011 Travelling Light (2011), followed by The Fury Project. She has also produced the CDs Healing Pool ("a clever and fresh fusion of eclectic, soulful and African traditional vibrations") and Mine 4 Life.

Her work has appeared in publications including Dance the Guns to Silence: 100 Poems for Ken Saro-Wiwa (Flipped Eye, 2005), Security (Flipped Eye, 2012), No Condition is Permanent (Platform London, 2010), Reflections From Mirror City (Tongue in Chic), and New Daughters of Africa (edited by Margaret Busby, 2019).

Among her involvement with various other activities and projects, Edwards is founder and Creative Director of ©ViD, an umbrella creative arts and activism company.
