= Kaun Kitne Paani Mein =

Kaun Kitney Paani Mein
- Directed by: Nila Madhab Panda
- Screenplay by: Deepak Venkateshan
- Story by: Nila Madhab Panda; Deepak Venkateshan
- Produced by: One Drop Foundation; Eleeanora images Pvt Ltd
- Starring: Kunal Kapoor; Radhika Apte; Saurabh Shukla; Gulshan Grover; Padam Mishra; Kush Gupta
- Cinematography: Subhransu Das
- Edited by: Deepika Kalra; Biren Jyoti Mohanty
- Music by: Original Songs: Bishakh-Kanish; Krishna Beura; Subhi; Style Bhai; Original Score: Mangesh Dhakde
- Production companies: One Drop Foundation; Elleanora images
- Release date: 28 August 2015
- Running time: 102 minutes
- Country: India
- Language: Hindi
- Box office: ₹0.29 crore

Kaun Kitney Paani Mein (transl. How much water is he in?) is an Indian drama film released on 28 August 2015 directed by Nila Madhab Panda starring Saurabh Shukla, Kunal Kapoor, Radhika Apte and Gulshan Grover in lead roles. The film is a satire on various social issues that are relevant in India such as water scarcity, caste discrimination and honour killing.

== Plot ==
Kaun Kitney Paani Mein is a story about two fictitious villages: Upri, which is made up of upper-caste people who are extremely lazy and lack any productive skills, and Bairi, which is made up of lower-caste people who have been involved in labour work and hence have gained a lot of skills. The people of Upri and Bairi are at loggerheads with each other, as generations ago there was a murder-suicide due to caste issues by the then Maharaja ruling the then rich and upper-class Upri village.

As time went by, Upri has seen water shortage due to their lack of skills and Bairi has instead become prosperous. Maharaj Braj Singhdeo (Saurabh Shukla), the leader of Upri, survives on his reputation and is almost bankrupt now and doesn't even have money to send his son Raj Singhdeo (Kunal Kapoor) to college. On the other hand, Kharu Pahelwan (Gulshan Grover) is a prosperous MLA candidate from Bairi village whose daughter Paro (Radhika Apte) supports him intellectually and morally. Raj convinces his father Braj to plan and get resources from Bairi village by molesting or marrying Paro and to execute this plan Braj pretends to throw Raj out of his household. Raj goes on to live with Kharu as his assistant and slowly gets into the good books of Amrita Devi (Hema Singh), the president of the ruling party who Kharu represents. Raj also falls in love with Paro.

Braj Singhdeo plans an elaborate fraud with the assistance of Amrita Devi, Raj, a tailor who has dug a canal underground to suck water from Bairi and the temple priest to make believe goddess has intervened to get the villages to be united and that Raj and Paro should be married. The villages end up living peacefully together and Raj gets political mileage and becomes an important leader in Amrita's party.

== Cast ==
- Kunal Kapoor as Raj Singhdeo
- Radhika Apte as Paro
- Saurabh Shukla as Maharaj Braj Singhdeo
- Gulshan Grover as Kharu Pahelwan
- Ekavali Khanna as Gulabi
- Anubha Saurya as Princess
- Salil Mitra as Baba (cameo)
- Robin Das as Sowak
- Padam Mishra as Bachelor
- Andy von Eich as Mr, Smith
- Shahidur Rahman as Dora
- Hema Singh as Amrita Devi
- Kush Gupta as Young Maharaj Braj Singhdeo
- Madhumita Barik as Bhulia's wife
- Prakruti Mishra as dancer (Rangabati song)

== Soundtrack ==
Kaun Kitney Paani Mein

Soundtrack album by Krishna Beura, Bishakh Jyoti - Kanish & Subhi
- Released: 28 August 2015
- Genre: Feature film soundtrack
- Length: 13:54
- Language: Hindi
- Label: Zee Music Company
External audio
- Audio Jukebox on YouTube

The soundtrack of Kaun Kitney Paani Mein consists of 3 songs composed by Krishna Beura, Bishakh Jyoti - Kanish, Style Bhai and Subhi while the lyrics have been written by Protiqe Mojoomdar and Subhi.

Tracklist
No.	Title	Lyrics	Music	Singer(s)	Length
1.	"Rangabati"	Protiqe Mojoomdar	Krishna Beura	Krishna Beura, Rekha Rao	04:51
2.	"Chala Murari"	Protiqe Mojoomdar	Bishakh Jyoti - Kanish	Amit Kumar	05:24
3.	"Ho Naa"	Subhi	Subhi, Style Bhai	Shilpa Rao	03:39
Total length:					13:54

== Reception ==
=== Critical response ===
Kaun Kitney Paani Mein received a mixed response from the critics. Rohit Vats of Hindustan Times praised the movie saying, "This Radhika Apte, Kunal Kapoor starrer takes a strong stand against the barriers of caste and class. The director’s commitment to social values is clearly visible in the film and he deserves praise for his efforts" and gave it a rating of 3 stars out of 5. Gayatri Gauri of First Post praised the subject and the performances of its actors Saurabh Shukla and Radhika Apte but was critical of the director Nila Madhab Panda saying, "With Kaun Kitney Paani Mein, he has an excellent premise. He’s chosen to tell his story as a satire, which makes the film entertaining in parts, but he struggles to make it look and feel credible. Yet despite its pitfalls, Kaun Kitney Paani Mein has moments of fun and a subject that is relevant." Saibal Chatterjee of NDTV applauded the performances and the director for selecting a unique concept saying, "Soil re-mineralisation? That is unprecedented for a Hindi film. Kaun Kitney Paani Mein goes where Hindi cinema rarely ever does. For that alone it deserves to be seen" and gave the film a rating of 3 stars out of 5.

Shubhra Gupta of The Indian Express appreciated the performance of Saurabh Shukla and the idea selected for the film but criticized the director for the poor execution of a good idea saying, "Good idea, faulty execution. Using water as a trade commodity is a powerful concept, especially given that there is so much drought and so little accessible clean drinking water in so many parts of India." and gave the film a rating of 1 1/2 stars out of 5. Renuka Vyavahare of The Times of India applauded the narration, acting performances and humour of the film but found the film to be too inconsistent. She gave the film a rating of 2 1/2 stars out of 5 and said, "In the present-day situation, where water is one of the most precious resources, Kaun Kitney Paani Mein touches upon a relevant issue but wraps it all too conveniently, without being confrontational."
