= Shalin Bhanot =

Indian actor (born 1983)

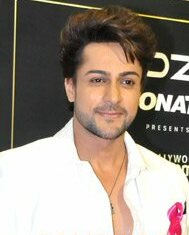
- Bhanot in 2023
- Born: 15 November 1983 (age 42); Jabalpur, Madhya Pradesh, India
- Occupation: Actor
- Years active: 2004–present
- Spouse: Dalljiet Kaur (m. 2009; div. 2015)
- Children: 1

Shalin Bhanot (born 15 November 1983) is an Indian actor who works in Hindi television. He started his career as a contestant in Roadies 2 and has since acted in various serials and web shows. In 2008, participated in Nach Baliye 4 and emerged as the winner. He then participated in Bigg Boss 16 and Khatron Ke Khiladi 14 and finished as a finalist in both the shows.

== Early life ==
Bhanot was born to Sunita and Brijmohan Bhanot and hails from a business family based in Jabalpur, Madhya Pradesh. He is an avid dancer and fitness enthusiast.

== Personal life ==
Bhanot married actress Dalljiet Kaur in 2009. In 2014, the couple had their first child, a boy, Jaydon. In 2015, Kaur filed for divorce and accused Bhanot of domestic violence. She claimed that he never even visited the doctor with her while she was pregnant. She stated that he accused her of trying to influence the doctors and didn't even want her to have a C-Section. Kaur added that Bhanot was violent towards her even in front of her parents from the start of their marriage. They got divorced in 2015 with Kaur having Jaydon's custody but Bhanot having visiting rights.

== Career ==
Bhanot started his career in 2004 with reality show MTV Roadies 2 as contestant. He then seen played Akshay in Ayushmaan (2005). From 2005–06, he was seen playing Karan in Saat Phere: Saloni Ka Safar on Zee TV and as Mihir in Sanya. He then appeared as Agni in Kulvaddhu on Sony TV. He made a cameo appearance on Kaajjal and starred in Star Plus's Grihasti. In 2009, Bhanot participated in StarPlus dance reality show Nach Baliye 4 along with his former wife Daljeet Kaur and emerged as the winner of the show. He has been trained by Hollywood acting coach Michelle Danner.

From October 2022 to February 2023, he was seen participating in Colors TV's reality show Bigg Boss 16, where he finished as a finalist at the fifth position. In February 2023, he was offered the male lead for the Balaji Telefilms fiction show Bekaboo, produced by Ekta Kapoor, on the finale of Bigg Boss 16, which he accepted and went on to feature on the show.

== Filmography ==
=== Films ===
Year	Title	Role	Language	Ref.
2006	Pyare Mohan	Rohit	Hindi	
2016	Love Ke Fundey	Aryan	Hindi	

=== Television ===
Year	Title	Role	Notes
2004	MTV Roadies 2	Contestant	4th place
2005	Ayushmaan	Akshay	
2005–2006	Saat Phere – Saloni Ka Safar	Karan	
2005–2006	Sanya	Mihir	
2006–2007	Kulvaddhu	Agni	
2007	Betiyaan Apni Yaa Paraaya Dhan	Veer Jadeja	
2007	Kaajjal	Shivansh Kapoor	
2007	Aahat	Mayank	
2007–2008	Sangam	Madanlal	
2007–2008	Naaginn	Kanishk / Keshav	
2007–2010	Air Hostess	Aryan	
2008	Ssshhhh...Phir Koi Hai	Rajveer / Raj Malhotra	
2008	Ssshhhh...Phir Koi Hai	Rohan / Sameer	
2008	Saas v/s Bahu	Himself	Guest appearance
2008	Dill Mill Gayye	Chirag	
2008–2009	Grihasti	Manas Ahuja	
2008–2009	Nach Baliye 4	Contestant	Winner
2010	Do Hanson Ka Jodaa	Suryakamal	
2011	Baat Hamari Pakki Hai	Rahul	
2011	Beend Banoongaa Ghodi Chadhunga	Mihir	
2011	Nachle Ve with Saroj Khan	Contestant	
2012	Sajda Tere Pyaar Mein	Ranveer	
2014	Yeh Hai Aashiqui	Rakshit	
2014–2015	Box Cricket League 1	Contestant	
2015	SuperCops vs Supervillains	Dr. Shizal	
2015–2016	Suryaputra Karn	Duryodhan	
2017	Sher-e-Punjab: Maharaja Ranjit Singh	Maha Singh	
2018	Laal Ishq	Prince / Niku	Episode 17: "I Love Books"
2019–2020	Ram Siya Ke Luv Kush	Ravan	
2019	Naagin 4: Bhagya Ka Zehreela Khel	Keshav Goradia	Cameo appearance
2020	Khatron Ke Khiladi 10	Himself	Guest appearance
2022–2023	Bigg Boss 16	Contestant	5th place
2023	Bekaboo	Ranav / Pratham	
2024	Bigg Boss 17	Himself	Guest appearance
2024	Khatron Ke Khiladi 14	Contestant	4th place

=== Web series ===
Year	Title	Role	Notes
2023	Inspector Avinash	Inspector Baljit Singh	
