= Hema Singh =

Indian professor and actress

- Education: Miranda House; National School of Drama
- Occupations: Professor, Actress

Hema Singh is an Indian professor and actress. Her first role was at the age of 11 in the soap opera Kyunki Saas Bhi Kabhi Bahu Thi. She played a politician in the film Kaun Kitne Paani Mein (2015). She later attended the National School of Drama (NSD) in New Delhi. After doing some freelance work as an actress, she became an associate professor at NSD. One of her most prominent roles is that of Imarti Devi in the television series Kairi — Rishta Khatta Meetha. She played the role of Jhumri in Kanjoos Makhichoos (2023).

== Filmography ==
Year	Title	Role	Notes
2012	Kairi — Rishta Khatta Meetha	Imarti Shrivastav aka Imarti Devi	
2015	Run Bhuumi - Champs Don't Cry	Daljeet Kapoor	
2015	Kaun Kitne Paani Mein	Amrita Devi	
2017	Beyond the Clouds		
2023	Kanjoos Makhichoos	Jhumri Pandey, Ganga's sister	

=== Awards ===
- Sangeet Natak Akademi Award for Acting (2017)
- Best Actress Award in a Negative Role at ITA (2012) for Kairi — Rishta Khatta Meetha

=== Plays ===
- Mashiriqui Hoor (Parsi)
- Din Ke Andhere (The House of Bernarda Alba )
