= Sushma K. Rao =

Indian actress, dancer and television host

- Born: Sushma Krishnamurthy Rao; Koppa, Chikmagalur district, Karnataka, India
- Occupations: Actress; dancer; television presenter
- Years active: 2004–present
- Spouse: Madhukar Adhimurthy (m. 2010)

Sushma Krishnamurthy Rao (born 1 July 1987) is an Indian actress, dancer and television host. As an actress, she is one of the popular actress in Kannada television. After having made her debut in S. Narayan's Bhageerathi, she became recognized for her role as Bhavana in soap opera Guptagamini. An accomplished bharatanatyam dancer, she is recipient of the 1997 Aryabhata Award for Dance.

== Biography ==
Rao was born and raised in Koppa, a town in Chikmagalur district of India's Karnataka State. She graduated with a Bachelor of Science degree in computer science from KLE College and also holds a bachelor's degree in Hindi language that she obtained from the University of Madras. A trained Bharatanatyam dancer, Rao performed at events in New Delhi, Mumbai, Jaipur and Thiruvananthapuram and in the Hampi Utsav. She is a recipient of Karnataka State and Central scholarships (NCERT) in dance. She also won the Aryabhata award for dance in 1997.

Rao began her television career on being urged to try acting by actor Vijay Kashi. During this time, she was learning the Kuchipudi under Vyjayanthi Kashi. Rao made her television debut with S. Narayan's Bhageerathi in which she played Veena, the sister of Hema Prabhath's character. She then appeared in Swathi Muttu as Pallavi, in Bidige Chandrama as Shashikala, before starring in Yaava Janmada Maitri as Ananya in one of three roles, in Guptagamini as Bhavana, and in Sose Thanda Sowbhagya as Keerthi. Rao was awarded the Aryabhata Award for Acting in 2005, the Karnataka Television Association Award for Best Actress for her performance in Guptagamini and the Zee Kannada Best Actress Award for Sose Thanda Sowbhagya in 2012.

In 2020, Rao hosted the game show Genes that "showcase family bonding" and invited television actors as participants.

== Television ==
Year	Title	Channel	Role	Notes
	Bhageerathi		Veena	
	Swathi Muttu		Pallavi	
	Bidige Chandrama		Shashikala	
	Yaava Janmada Maitri		Ananya	Triple role
2005	Guptagamini		Bhavana	Karnataka Television Association Award for Best Actress
2012	Sose Thanda Sowbhagya	Zee Kannada	Keerthi	Zee Kutumba Award for Best Magalu; Zee Kannada Award for Best Actress
2014	Tarle Nan Maklu	Star Suvarna	Host	
2020	Genes	Zee Kannada	Host	
2021	Mane Mane Mahalakshmi	Zee Kannada	Host	
2022–2026	Bhagyalakshmi	Colors Kannada	Bhagya	Anubandha Awards (2023) For Best Mane Mechida Sose Anubandha Awarda (2024) for Best Actress
