= Bhagyalakshmi (2022 TV series) =

2022 Indian Kannada language TV series

- Genre: Drama
- Created by: Jaya Alva
- Written by: Jaya Alva
- Directed by: Yashwanth Pandu
- Creative director: Darshan Gowdu
- Starring: Sushma K. Rao; Sudarshan Rangaprasad; Padmaja Rao
- Opening theme: Ivare Bhagyalakshmi
- Country of origin: India
- Original language: Kannada
- No. of episodes: 1159

Production
- Executive producer: Srinivas
- Producer: Prakash
- Production location: Bengaluru
- Camera setup: Multi-camera
- Running time: 22 minutes
- Production company: Shri Jaimatha Combines

Original release
- Network: Colors Kannada
- Release: 10 October 2022 – 7 June 2026

Bhagyalakshmi is an Indian Kannada-language television drama series which premiered from 10 October 2022. It is produced by Jai Mata Combines and airing on Colors Kannada.

== Plot ==
The series follows the journey of Bhagya, a devoted wife and daughter-in-law, who endures humiliation from her husband Tandav while maintaining a positive outlook on life. The show highlights the complexities of relationships within an Indian joint family, particularly the dynamics between a mother-in-law and a daughter-in-law.

== Cast ==
=== Main ===
- Sushma K. Rao as Bhagya – Tandav’s wife.
- Padmaja Rao as Kusuma – Tandav’s mother and Bhagya’s mother-in-law.
- Sudarshan Rangaprasad as Tandav – Kusuma’s son and Bhagya’s husband.

=== Recurring ===
- Gautami Gowda / Kavya Gowda as Shreshta – Tandav’s lover.
- Amrutha Gowda as Tanvi – Bhagya and Tandav’s daughter.
- Nihaar Gowda as Tanmay – Bhagya and Tandav’s son.
- Sunitha Shetty as Sunanda – Bhagya’s mother.
- Asha Ayyanar as Pooja – Bhagya’s younger sister.

=== Cameo appearances ===
- Ankita Amar as Meera
- Yamuna Srinidhi as Bhagya's teacher
- Neha Gowda as Shruthi
- Rashmi Prabhakar as Lacchi

== Adaptations ==
Language	Title	Original release	Network(s)	Last aired	Notes
Kannada	Bhagyalakshmi ಭಾಗ್ಯಲಕ್ಷ್ಮಿ	10 October 2022	Colors Kannada	7 June 2026	Original
Marathi	Kavyanjali – Sakhi Savali काव्यांजली – सखी सावली	29 May 2023	Colors Marathi	26 May 2024	Remake
Hindi	Mangal Lakshmi मंगल लक्ष्मी	27 February 2024	Colors TV	26 June 2026	Remake
