= Titu Ambani =

- Directed by: Rohit Raj Goyal
- Written by: Rohit Raj Goyal
- Screenplay by: Rohit Raj Goyal
- Produced by: Mahendra Vijaydan Detha, Dinesh Kumar
- Starring: Tushar Pandey; Deepika Singh; Raghubir Yadav
- Cinematography: Sunil Vishwakarma
- Edited by: Sanjay Sharma
- Music by: Bharat-Hitarth
- Production company: Sabal Productions
- Release date: 8 July 2022
- Country: India
- Language: Hindi

Titu Ambani is a 2022 Indian Hindi language social drama film produced by Mahendra Vijaydan Detha and Dinesh Kumar under the banner of Sabal productions.The film is directed, story and screenplay by Rohit Raj Goyal. Television actress Deepika Singh will mark her Bollywood debut with Titu Ambani.

== Cast ==
- Tushar Pandey as Titu
- Deepika Singh as Mosmi
- Raghubir Yadav as Shukla Ji
- Pritam Jaiswal as Kuku
- Virendra Saxena as Narendra Trivedi
- Sapna Sand as Prabhavati Shukla
- Samta Sagar as Sugandha Trivedi
- Brijendra Kala as Sajan Chaturvedi
- Vibhor Sharma as Amrit Gupta

== Soundtrack ==
Titu Ambani

Soundtrack album by Bharat-Hitarth
- Released: June 2022
- Genre: Feature film soundtrack
- Length: 16:43
- Label: Sony Music India

The film's soundtrack was composed by Bharat-Hitarth while lyrics are written by Mayur Puri.

Track listing
No.	Title	Lyrics	Singer(s)	Length
1.	"Jabre Piya"	Mayur Puri	Rekha Bhardwaj	4:15
2.	"Mr. Malang"	Mayur Puri	Shalmali Kholgade	4:12
3.	"Haq Tumko Hi"	Mayur Puri	Abhay Jodhpurkar	4:10
4.	"Badal Gaye Tum"	Mayur Puri	Yashika Sikka	4:06
Total length:				16:43
