= Dalljiet Kaur =

Indian television actress

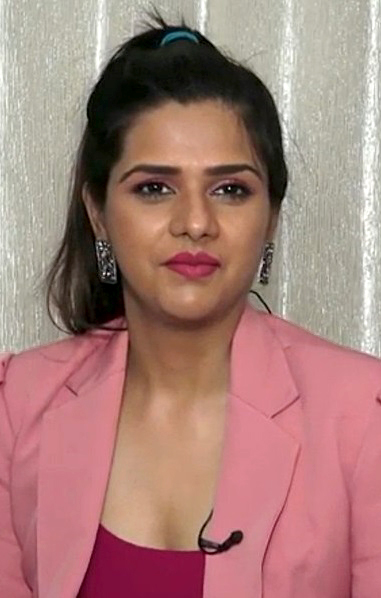
- Kaur in 2020
- Born: Daljeet Kaur; 15 November 1982 (age 43); Ludhiana, Punjab, India
- Occupation: Actress
- Years active: 2004–present
- Spouses: Shalin Bhanot (m. 2009; div. 2015); Nikhil Patel (m. 2023; sep. 2024)
- Children: 1

Dalljiet Kaur (born 15 November 1982) is an Indian television actress primarily known for her portrayals of Niyati in Kulvaddhu, Anjali in Iss Pyaar Ko Kya Naam Doon? and Manjiri in Kaala Teeka. She participated and became the winner of Nach Baliye with Shalin Bhanot. In 2019, she participated in the reality show Bigg Boss 13.

== Early life ==
Kaur was born on 15 November 1982 in Ludhiana. She comes from a family of army background. Her father is a retired Colonel and her two elder sisters are in the defence services, as Indian Army officers.

== Career ==
In 2004, she won the title of Miss Pune, as well as being a finalist in a number of other pageants including, Miss Navy, Miss Mumbai and Miss Maharashtra Queen. She made her television début in the Zee TV drama, Manshaa, and this was followed by appearances in C.I.D., Aahat and Raat Hone Ko Hai. In 2005, she appeared in the show in a cameo role in Kaisa Ye Pyar Hai. Her first role as a protagonist in a drama was in Kulvaddhu as Niyati, a young girl from a royal Jodhpur family.

Following the abrupt ending of Kulvaddhu, Daljeet went on to play Shikha in Chhoona Hai Aasmaan. She also appeared in Star Plus show Santaan from 2007 to 2009.

In 2008, she participated in the dance reality show Nach Baliye in the fourth season and became the winner with ex-husband Shalin Bhanot. In 2011 she played Anjali in Star Plus' show Iss Pyaar Ko Kya Naam Doon?. She later appeared in other shows like Saath Nibhaana Saathiya (2012), Sasural Simar Ka & Rangrasiya (2013).

Kaur made her comeback to television with Colors TV's Swaragini - Jodein Rishton Ke Sur where she played Janki. She later did an episodic appearance in Life OK's Savdhaan India. From 2015 to 2017, she played one of the leads in Zee TV's Kaala Teeka.

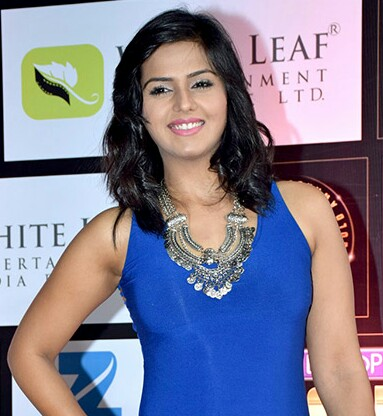
Daljeet Kaur at Gold Awards 2017

In 2017, she portrayed Aadishakti in Maa Shakti. In 2018, she played one of the supporting leads in Star Plus show Qayamat Ki Raat. She later appeared in Silsila Badalte Rishton Ka and Vikram Betaal Ki Rahasya Gatha

In 2019, she essayed the role of antagonist Antara Rawat on the show Guddan Tumse Na Ho Payega which aired on Zee TV. In September 2019, Kaur was a celebrity contestant in the thirteenth season of the Indian version of the reality TV show Big Brother, Bigg Boss.

In May 2021, Kaur appeared in the music video 'Befikar Raho' alongside Asim Riaz's brother Umar Riaz, which she produced as well. From December 2021 to April 2025, she portrayed Dr. Avni Sehgal in Star Bharat's Sasural Genda Phool 2. Since July 2025, she selected to portray Bela in Colors TV's Dhaakad Beera after a three year television hiatus.

== Personal life ==
Kaur met Shalin Bhanot while working together in Kulvaddhu, and married him in 2009. They had a son in 2014. In 2015, she filed for divorce accusing Shalin of domestic violence. Kaur claimed that Bhanot never even visited the doctor with her while she was pregnant. She stated that he accused her of trying to influence the doctors and didn't even want her to have a C-Section. Kaur added that Bhanot was violent towards her even in front of her parents from the start of their marriage. The couple was divorced in 2015. She married businessman Nikhil Patel on 18 March 2023. Kaur confirmed their separation on 25 May 2024.

== Filmography ==
=== Television ===
Year	Title	Role(s)	Notes
2004	Manshaa		
2005	Raat Hone Ko Hai		
2005	Kaisa Ye Pyar Hai	Tanaaz (Tanzy)	
2005	C.I.D.	Julie / Sandhya	Episode: "Hand in the Fish"
2006	C.I.D.	Poonam	Episode: "Aatank"
2006	C.I.D.	Neha / Reshma	Episode: "Body in the Suitcase"
2006	C.I.D.	Sirja	Episode: "The Invisible Eye Witness"
2006–2007	Kulvaddhu	Niyati Chauhan / Niyati Shaurya Singh Rathore	
2007	Mano Ya Na Mano	Anita Ranvijay Singh Rathore	Episode: "Cursed Diamond"
2007–2008	Chhoona Hai Aasmaan	Shikha Singh	
2007–2009	Santaan	Suhana Dixit	
2008	Sapna Babul Ka... Bidaai	Suhana Dixit	Guest
2008	Saas v/s Bahu	Contestant	
2008–2009	Nach Baliye 4	Contestant	Winner
2009	Kahaniya Vikram Aur Betaal Ki	Princess Madhumati	
2010	Nachle Ve with Saroj Khan	Contestant	
2011–2015	Adaalat	Trishikha Jha	Episode: "Jhooth Ka Sach"
2011–2015	Adaalat	Sheena Kapoor / Nandini Kapoor	Episode: "Evil Twin"
2011–2012	Iss Pyaar Ko Kya Naam Doon?	Anjali Singh Raizada / Anjali Shyam Jha	
2014–2015	Box Cricket League 1	Contestant	
2015–2016	Swaragini - Jodein Rishton Ke Sur	Janki Gadodia	
2015	Aahat	Shalini Kaushik	Episode 50 2005 Episode 14
2015	Code Red	Scarlett	Episode 151
2015	Fear Files: Dehshat Dobara	Shweta Pathak	
2015	Savdhaan India	Shruti Trivedi	Episodes 31–35
2015–2017	Kaala Teeka	Manjari Jha	
2016	Box Cricket League 2	Contestant	
2017	Maa Shakti	Devi Aadishakti/Kaali	
2018	Box Cricket League 3	Contestant	
2018	Qayamat Ki Raat	Karuna Thakur/Zinda Laash	Dual Role
2018	Vikram Betaal Ki Rahasya Gatha	Anusuya	Special appearance/Helself
2018	Silsila Badalte Rishton Ka	Amrita	Special appearance/Helself
2019	Haiwaan : The Monster	Divya Agnihotri	Special appearance/Helself
2019–2020	Guddan Tumse Na Ho Payega	Antara Rawat	
2019	Bigg Boss 13	Contestant	21st place
2021–2022	Sasural Genda Phool 2	Dr. Avni Sehgal	
2025	Dhaakad Beera	Bela	

=== Web series ===
Year	Title	Role	Ref.
2019	BOSS: Baap of Special Services	Devki	
2024	Chitta Ve	Manpreet	

=== Music videos ===
Year	Title	Singer	Ref.
2019	Ishq Kare Barbadiyaan	Ankit Tiwari	
2020	Harjaiyaan	Mujeeb Ul Hassan	
2021	Befikar Raho	Jugni	

== See also ==
- List of Hindi television actresses
- List of Indian television actresses
- List of Indian television actors
