= Abhilasha Patil =

Indian actress (1974–2021)

- Born: 6 April 1974; Calcutta, West Bengal, India (present-day Kolkata)
- Died: 5 May 2021 (aged 47); Mumbai, Maharashtra, India
- Occupation: Actor
- Known for: Badrinath Ki Dulhania (2017); Chhichhore (2019)

Abhilasha Patil (6 April 1974 – 5 May 2021) was an Indian actor who worked in Marathi and Hindi films. She played the role of Raghav's nurse in the 2019-film Chhichhore.

== Biography ==
Patil was born in Calcutta (present-day Kolkata).

Patil played in the films Te Aath Diwas (2015), Pipsi (2018), Bayko Deta Ka Bayko (2020), Prawaas (2020) and Tujha Majha Arrange Marriage (2021). She also played roles in Hindi films like Badrinath Ki Dulhania (2017), Good Newwz (2019) and Chhichhore (2019).

Patil died on 5 May 2021, from COVID-19, aged 47.

== Filmography ==
=== Hindi movies ===
- Badrinath Ki Dulhania (2017) – teacher
- Chhichhore (2019) – Raghav's nurse
- Good Newwz (2019) – air hostess

=== Marathi movies ===
- Te Aath Diwas (2015)
- Pipsi (2018) – Kaveri
- Bayko Deta Ka Bayko (2020)
- Prawaas (2020)
- Tujha Majha Arrange Marriage (2021)
- Luckdown Be Positive (2021)
