= Nach Baliye =

Indian celebrity reality television series

- Genre: Dance; Reality
- Created by: Sanvari Alagh Nair, Fazila Allana, Kamna Menezes
- Directed by: Deepak Ghatani: (Seasons 1–2); Ashim Sen: (Seasons 5–6); Arun Sheshkumar: (Seasons 4, 7–8)
- Country of origin: India
- Original language: Hindi
- No. of seasons: 9
- No. of episodes: 201

Production
- Producers: Hemant Ruprell (Season 4–6); Shobha Kapoor (Season 7)
- Editor: Kumar Priyadarshi (Season 8)
- Production companies: SOL Productions (season 1–3); Wizcraft International (Season 4–6); Balaji Telefilms (season 7); BBC Worldwide (season 8); Salman Khan TV (season 9)

Original release
- Network: Star One (seasons 1–2); Star Plus (season 3–9)
- Release: 17 October 2005 – 3 November 2019

Nach Baliye (transl. Dance Partner) is an Indian Hindi-language celebrity dance reality television series that airs on Star Plus. It is loosely based on Dancing With The Stars.

== Production ==
=== Concept ===
The show is a competition where 10 television celebrity couples compete against each other. Contestants dance to a different tune, different theme and different styles every week and their performance are evaluated and scored by the judges. Each week one couple is eliminated based on public voting and their scores.

In Season 9, the contestant ratings were changed to be on a scale from 1 to 100.

=== Reception ===
In 2012, when season 5 premiered the show did very well throughout the season. The grand premiere has gained 4.1 TRP.

== Series ==
| Season | Judges | | | First Aired | Last Aired | Winners | |
|---|---|---|---|---|---|---|---|
| 1 | Saroj Khan | Malaika Arora | Farhan Akhtar | 17 October 2005 | 19 December 2005 | Sachin Pilgaonkar | Supriya Pilgaonkar |
| 2 | Saroj Khan | Malaika Arora | Kunal Kohli | 25 September 2006 | 18 December 2006 | Hussain Kuwajerwala | Tina Kuwajerwala |
| 3 | Vaibhavi Merchant | Isha Koppikar | David Dhawan | 21 September 2007 | 22 December 2007 | Aamir Ali | Sanjeeda Sheikh |
| 4 | Farah Khan | Karisma Kapoor | Arjun Rampal | 17 October 2008 | 1 February 2009 | Shalin Bhanot | Dalljiet Kaur |
| 5 | Shilpa Shetty | Sajid Khan | Terrence Lewis | 29 December 2012 | 23 March 2013 | Jay Bhanushali | Mahhi Vij |
| 6 | Shilpa Shetty | Sajid Khan | Terrence Lewis | 9 November 2013 | 1 February 2014 | Rithvik Dhanjani | Asha Negi |
| 7 | Marzi Pestonji | Preity Zinta | Chetan Bhagat | 26 April 2015 | 19 July 2015 | Himmanshu Malhotra | Amruta Khanvilkar |
| 8 | Sonakshi Sinha | Mohit Suri | Terrence Lewis | 2 April 2017 | 25 June 2017 | Vivek Dahiya | Divyanka Tripathi |
| 9 | Raveena Tandon | Ahmed Khan | | 19 July 2019 | 3 November 2019 | Prince Narula | Yuvika Chaudhary |
| 10 | TBA | | | TBA | TBA | TBA | TBA |

== Season 1 ==
Nach Baliye
- Season 1
- Presented by: Shabir Ahluwalia; Sangita Ghosh
- Judges: Farhan Akhtar; Malaika Arora; Saroj Khan
- No. of contestants: 20
- Winners: Sachin Pilgaonkar; Supriya Pilgaonkar
- Runners-up: Manish Goel; Poonam Narula
- No. of episodes: 24

Release
- Original network: Star One
- Original release: 17 October – 17 December 2005

Series chronology
- Next → Season 2

Nach Baliye 1 is the first season of the dance reality show, Nach Baliye.

It started on 17 October 2005 and ended on 19 December 2005 with Sachin Pilgaonkar and Supriya Pilgaonkar as the winners. The judges were Saroj Khan, Malaika Arora Khan and Farhan Akhtar with Sangeeta Ghosh and Shabbir Ahluwalia serving as the hosts. The series was produced by SOL Productions.

=== Contestants ===
- Sachin Pilgaonkar and Supriya Pilgaonkar, winners
- Manish Goel and Poonam Narula, runners-up
- Varun Badola and Rajeshwari Sachdev, 3rd position
- Rajev Paul and Delnaaz Irani, 4th position
- Parmeet Sethi and Archana Puran Singh, 5th position
- Apurva Agnihotri and Shilpa Saklani, 6th position
- Amit Sadh and Neeru Bajwa, 7th position
- Shakti Anand and Sai Deodhar, 8th position
- Mihir Mishra and Manini Mishra, 9th position
- Rohit Roy and Manasi Joshi Roy, 10th position

== Season 2 ==
Nach Baliye
- Season 2
- Presented by: Shabir Ahluwalia; Sangita Ghosh
- Judges: Kunal Kohli; Malaika Arora; Saroj Khan
- No. of contestants: 20
- Winners: Hussain Kuwajerwala; Tina Kuwajerwala
- Runners-up: Yash Tonk; Gauri Tonk
- No. of episodes: 24

Release
- Original network: Star One
- Original release: 25 September – 18 December 2006

Series chronology
- ← Previous; Season 1 Next → Season 3

Nach Baliye 2 is the second season of the dance reality show, Nach Baliye.

It started on 25 September 2006 and ended on 18 December 2006 with Hussain Kuwajerwala and Tina Kuwajerwala as the winners. Saroj Khan, Malaika Arora Khan and Kunal Kohli were the judges. Sangeeta Ghosh and Shabbir Ahluwalia hosted the season. SOL Productions produced the second season as well.

=== Contestants ===
- Hussain Kuwajerwala and Tina Kuwajerwala, winners
- Yash Tonk and Gauri Tonk, runners-up
- Bakhtiyar Irani and Tannaz Irani, 3rd position
- Hiten Tejwani and Gauri Pradhan, 4th position
- Manav Gohil and Shweta Kawatra, 5th position
- Raja Chaudhary and Shweta Tiwari, 6th position
- Arjun Punj and Gurdeep Kohli, 7th position
- Sharad Kelkar and Keerti Kelkar, 8th position
- Gaurav Chopra and Narayani Shastri, 9th position
- Rasik Dave and Ketki Dave, 10th position

== Season 3 ==
Nach Baliye
- Season 3
- Presented by: Hussain Kuwajerwala; Tina Kuwajerwala
- Judges: Vaibhavi Merchant; Isha Koppikar; David Dhawan
- No. of contestants: 22
- Winners: Aamir Ali; Sanjeeda Shaikh
- Runners-up: Abhishek Avasthi; Rakhi Sawant
- No. of episodes: 24

Release
- Original network: Star Plus
- Original release: 21 September – 22 December 2007

Series chronology
- ← Previous; Season 2 Next → Season 4

Nach Baliye 3 is the third season of the dance reality show, Nach Baliye.

It started on 21 September 2007 and ended on 22 December 2007 with Sanjeeda Sheikh and Aamir Ali as the winners. The judges were Vaibhavi Merchant, Isha Koppikar and David Dhawan. The winners of the second season, Hussain Kuwajerwala and Tina Kuwajerwala, hosted the show. It was produced by Diamond Pictures and moved from Star One to Star Plus. It was created by Anil Jha who was also the Showrunner for Season 3,4, and later 9.

=== Contestants ===
- Aamir Ali and Sanjeeda Shaikh, winners
- Abhishek Avasthi and Rakhi Sawant, runners-up
- Krushna Abhishek and Kashmera Shah, 3rd position
- Karan Patel and Amita Chandekar, 4th position
- Indraneil Sengupta and Barkha Sengupta, 5th position
- Alexx O'Nell and Sweta Keswani, 6th position
- Hanif Hilal and Pooja Bedi, 7th position
- Karan Grover and Kavita Kaushik, 8th position
- Vikas Sethi and Amita Sethi, 9th position
- Shakti Kapoor and Shivangi Kapoor, 10th position; quit
- Kiran Janjani and Ritu Janjani, 11th position

== Season 4 ==
Nach Baliye
- Season 4
- Presented by: Aamir Ali; Sanjeeda Shaikh; Ali Merchant; Sara Khan; Hiten Tejwani; Gauri Pradhan
- Judges: Arjun Rampal; Karisma Kapoor; Farah Khan
- No. of contestants: 28
- Winners: Shalin Bhanot; Dalljiet Kaur
- Runners-up: Naman Shaw; Megha Gupta
- No. of episodes: 24

Release
- Original network: Star Plus
- Original release: 17 October 2008 – 2 February 2009

Series chronology
- ← Previous; Season 3 Next → Season 5

Nach Baliye 4 is the fourth season of the dance reality show, Nach Baliye.

It started on 17 October 2008 and ended on 1 February 2009 with Shalin Bhanot and Dalljiet Kaur as the winners.

Sanjeeda Sheikh and Aamir Ali were the initial hosts but Sara Khan and Ali Merchant hosted in Week 5 and Hiten Tejwani and Gauri Pradhan Tejwani hosted in Week 8.

Farah Khan, Karisma Kapoor, and Arjun Rampal were the judges.

=== Contestants ===
- Shalin Bhanot and Dalljiet Kaur, winners
- Naman Shaw and Megha Gupta, runners-up
- Kapil Nirmal and Anjali Abrol, semi-finalists
- Yash Tonk and Gauri Tonk, wildcards; semi-finalists
- Vineet Raina and Tanushree Kaushal, eliminated
- Amit Gupta and Reshmi Ghosh, eliminated
- Karanvir Bohra and Teejay Sidhu, quit
- Mohit Malik and Addite Shirwaikar, eliminated
- Sudeep Sahir and Anantika Sahir, eliminated
- Mazher Sayed and Mouli Ganguly, eliminated
- Jaspal Bhatti and Savita Bhatti, eliminated
- Jatin Shah and Priya Bathija, eliminated
- Abhijeet Sawant and Shilpa Sawant, eliminated
- Chetan Hansraj and Lavinia Pereira, wildcards; eliminated

== Season 5 ==
Nach Baliye
- Season 5
- Presented by: Gautam Rode; Karan Wahi
- Judges: Shilpa Shetty; Sajid Khan; Terence Lewis
- No. of contestants: 22
- Winners: Jay Bhanushali; Mahhi Vij
- Runners-up: Ravi Dubey; Sargun Mehta
- No. of episodes: 24

Release
- Original network: Star Plus
- Original release: 29 December 2012 – 23 March 2013

Series chronology
- ← Previous; Season 4 Next → Season 6

Nach Baliye 5 is the fifth season of the dance reality show - Nach Baliye.

It started on 29 December 2012 and ended on 23 March 2013 with Mahhi Vij and Jay Bhanushali as the winners.

Karan Wahi and Gautam Rode hosted the season. The judges were Shilpa Shetty, Sajid Khan and Terrence Lewis.

=== Contestants ===
- Jay Bhanushali and Mahhi Vij, winners
- Ravi Dubey and Sargun Mehta, first runners-up
- Arvind Kumar and Neelu Vaghela, second runners-up
- Jaisheel Dhami and Suhasi Dhami, third runners-up
- Karan Mehra and Nisha Rawal, eliminated on 16 March 2013
- Kunwar Amar and Charlie Chauhan, eliminated on 9 March 2013
- Parag Tyagi and Shefali Jariwala, eliminated on 2 March 2013
- Rahul Mahajan and Dimpy Ganguli, eliminated on 23 February 2013
- Kushal Tandon and Elena Boeva, eliminated on 3 February 2013
- Ankush Mohla and Smita Bansal, eliminated on 27 January 2013
- Keshav Arora and Deepshikha Nagpal, eliminated on 13 January 2013

=== Guests ===
- Drashti Dhami

=== Shriman V/s Shrimati ===
Nach Baliye Shriman V/s Shrimati is an extension of the Nach Baliye series, and ran in April 2013. In Shriman V/s Shrimati, the celebrity couples did not dance together but instead competed against each other. The series ended in a tie.

Gurmeet Choudhary was declared the Best Performer of the series.

== Season 6 ==
Nach Baliye
- Season 6
- Presented by: Gautam Rode; Karan Wahi
- Judges: Shilpa Shetty; Sajid Khan; Terence Lewis
- No. of contestants: 22
- Winners: Rithvik Dhanjani; Asha Negi
- Runners-up: Gurmeet Choudhary; Debina Bonnerjee
- No. of episodes: 24

Release
- Original network: Star Plus
- Original release: 9 November 2013 – 1 February 2014

Series chronology
- ← Previous; Season 5 Next → Season 7

Nach Baliye 6 is the sixth season of the dance reality show, Nach Baliye.

It premiered on 9 November 2013 on Star Plus. Shilpa Shetty, Sajid Khan and Terrence Lewis were the judges and Gautam Rode and Karan Wahi hosted the season.

Rithvik Dhanjani and Asha Negi were declared as the winners of Nach Baliye Season 6 on 1 February 2014. Gurmeet Choudhary and Debina Bonnerjee were declared the runners-up.Sara Khan did a cameo dance performance in the wild card special episode along with Paras Chhabra.

Writing for Rediff.com, Paloma Sharma gave the show 2.5 stars out of 5 in its first week, stating "perhaps the hosts and the judges could keep their clothes on and refrain from excessive flirting since Nach Baliye does happen to be a 'family show'."

=== Contestants ===
- Rithvik Dhanjani and Asha Negi, winners on 1 February 2014
- Gurmeet Choudhary and Debina Bonnerjee, first runners-up on 1 February 2014
- Ripudaman Handa and Shivangi Verma, second runners-up on 1 February 2014
- Vinod Thakur and Raksha Thakur, third runners-up on 1 February 2014
- Kiku Sharda and Priyanka Sharda (5th position), eliminated on 25 January 2014
- Raqesh Bapat and Ridhi Dogra (6th position), eliminated
- Ankur Ghai and Kanika Maheshwari (7th position), quit on 11 January 2014
- Omar Herror and Bruna Abdullah (8th position), eliminated on 8 December 2013; re-entered as wild card entrants, eliminated on 4 January 2014
- Paras Chhabra and Sara Khan (9th position), eliminated on 22 December 2013
- Raju Srivastav and Shikha Srivastav (9th position), eliminated on 15 December 2013
- Yash Sinha and Amrapali Gupta (10th position), eliminated on 1 December 2013
- Sanjeev Seth and Lata Sabharwal (11th position), eliminated on 24 November 2013

=== Guests ===
- Hina Khan
- Barun Sobti
- Deepika Singh
- Rucha Hasabnis
- Vishal Singh
- Ishita Dutta
- Mouni Roy
- Mahek Chahal
- Dharmesh Yelande
- Sayantani Ghosh
- Rashami Desai

=== Scoring chart ===
| Couple | Week 1 | Week 2 | Week 3 | Week 4 | Week 5 | Week 6 | Week 7 | | Week 8 | | Week 9 | | Week 10 | | Week 11 | | | Week 12 | Week 13 | |
|---|---|---|---|---|---|---|---|---|---|---|---|---|---|---|---|---|---|---|---|---|
| Rithvik | —N/a | 31 | 24 | 27 | 32 | 33 | 32 | | 30 | 32 | 24 | 29 | 30 | 33 | Rashami | 25 | 31 | —N/a | —N/a | Winner |
| Asha | —N/a | 31 | 24 | 27 | 32 | 33 | 32 | | 30 | 32 | 24 | 29 | 30 | 33 | Rashami | 25 | 31 | —N/a | —N/a | Winner |
| Gurmeet | —N/a | 31 | 30 | 33 | 30 | 33 | 23 | | 33 | 33 | 33 | 30 | 25 | 33 | Mouni | 22 | 31 | —N/a | —N/a | 1st runner-up |
| Debina | —N/a | 31 | 30 | 33 | 30 | 33 | 23 | | 33 | 33 | 33 | 30 | 25 | 33 | Mouni | 22 | 31 | —N/a | —N/a | 1st runner-up |
| Ripudaman | —N/a | 33 | 33 | 27 | 23 | 22 | —N/a | 33 | 33 | 24 | 33 | 25 | 32 | 32 | Sayantani | 33 | 32 | —N/a | —N/a | 2nd runner-up |
| Shivangi | —N/a | 33 | 33 | 27 | 23 | 22 | —N/a | 33 | 33 | 24 | 33 | 25 | 32 | 32 | Sayantani | 33 | 32 | —N/a | —N/a | 2nd runner-up |
| Vinod | —N/a | 27 | 33 | 33 | 33 | 27 | 27 | | 33 | 24 | 27 | 33 | 30 | 33 | Dharmesh | 26 | 30 | —N/a | —N/a | 3rd runner-up |
| Raksha | —N/a | 27 | 33 | 33 | 33 | 27 | 27 | | 33 | 24 | 27 | 33 | 30 | 33 | Dharmesh | 26 | 30 | —N/a | —N/a | 3rd runner-up |
| Kiku | —N/a | 22 | 33 | 27 | 29 | 31 | 27 | | 33 | 27 | 27 | 30 | 18 | 29 | Siddesh | 30 | 28 | —N/a | Eliminated | |
| Priyanka | —N/a | 22 | 33 | 27 | 29 | 31 | 27 | | 33 | 27 | 27 | 30 | 18 | 29 | Siddesh | 30 | 28 | —N/a | Eliminated | |
| Raqesh | —N/a | 24 | 33 | 26 | 32 | 32 | 33 | | 31 | 21 | 27 | 31 | 28 | 28 | Mahek | —N/a | Eliminated | | | |
| Ridhi | —N/a | 24 | 33 | 26 | 32 | 32 | 33 | | 31 | 21 | 27 | 31 | 28 | 28 | Mahek | —N/a | Eliminated | | | |
| Ankur | —N/a | 30 | 30 | 28 | 33 | 30 | 24 | | 25 | 23 | 26 | 23 | —N/a | Quit | | | | | | |
| Kanika | —N/a | 30 | 30 | 28 | 33 | 30 | 24 | | 25 | 23 | 26 | 23 | —N/a | Quit | | | | | | |
| Omar | —N/a | 28 | 27 | 29 | 27 | Eliminated | | 32 | 21 | 21 | 30 | Eliminated | | | | | | | | |
| Bruna | —N/a | 28 | 27 | 29 | 27 | Eliminated | | 32 | 21 | 21 | 30 | Eliminated | | | | | | | | |
| Paras | Not in Competition | | | | | | | 27 | Eliminated | | | | | | | | | | | |
| Sara | Not in Competition | | | | | | | 27 | Eliminated | | | | | | | | | | | |
| Raju | —N/a | 27 | 27 | 18 | 23 | 21 | | 26 | Eliminated | | | | | | | | | | | |
| Shikha | —N/a | 27 | 27 | 18 | 23 | 21 | | 26 | Eliminated | | | | | | | | | | | |
| Yash | —N/a | 19 | 30 | 24 | Eliminated | | | 26 | | | | | | | | | | | | |
| Amrapali | —N/a | 19 | 30 | 24 | Eliminated | | | 26 | | | | | | | | | | | | |
| Sanjeev | —N/a | 18 | 27 | Eliminated | | | | | | | | | | | | | | | | |
| Lata | —N/a | 18 | 27 | Eliminated | | | | | | | | | | | | | | | | |
| Bottom | None | None | Sanjeev-Lata; Yash-Amrapali | Ankur-Kanika; Yash-Amrapali | Kiku-Priyanka; Omar-Bruna | Raju-Shikha; Ripudaman-Shivangi | Kiku-Priyanka; Ripudaman-Shivangi | Omar-Bruna; Paras-Sara; Raju-Shikha; Ripudaman-Shivangi; Yash-Amrapali | None | | Ankur-Kanika; Omar-Bruna | | Ankur-Kanika; Kiku-Priyanka | | Kiku-Priyanka; Raqesh-Ridhi | | | Gurmeet-Debina; Kiku-Priyanka; Ripudaman-Shivangi; Rithvik-Asha; Vinod-Raksha | Finalists | |
| Bottom | None | None | Sanjeev-Lata; Yash-Amrapali | Ankur-Kanika; Yash-Amrapali | Kiku-Priyanka; Omar-Bruna | Raju-Shikha; Ripudaman-Shivangi | Kiku-Priyanka; Ripudaman-Shivangi | Omar-Bruna; Paras-Sara; Raju-Shikha; Ripudaman-Shivangi; Yash-Amrapali | None | | Ankur-Kanika; Omar-Bruna | | Ankur-Kanika; Kiku-Priyanka | | Kiku-Priyanka; Raqesh-Ridhi | | | Gurmeet-Debina; Kiku-Priyanka; Ripudaman-Shivangi; Rithvik-Asha; Vinod-Raksha | Gurmeet-Debina; Ripudaman-Shivangi; Rithvik-Asha; Vinod-Raksha | |
| Re-entered | None | | | | | | | Omar; Bruna | None | | | | | | | | | | | |
| Re-entered | None | | | | | | | Ripudaman; Shivangi | None | | | | | | | | | | | |
| Quit | None | | | | | | | | | | | | Ankur; Kanika | | None | | | | | |
| Eliminated | No; Elimination | No; Elimination | Sanjeev; Lata | Yash; Amrapali | Omar; Bruna | Raju; Shikha | Ripudaman; Shivani | Paras; Sara | No; Elimination | | Omar; Bruna | | No; Elimination | | Raqesh; Ridhi | | | Kiku; Priyanka | Vinod; Raksha | Ripudaman; Shivani |
| Eliminated | No; Elimination | No; Elimination | Sanjeev; Lata | Yash; Amrapali | Omar; Bruna | Raju; Shikha | Ripudaman; Shivani | Paras; Sara | No; Elimination | | Omar; Bruna | | No; Elimination | | Raqesh; Ridhi | | | Kiku; Priyanka | Gurmeet; Debina | Rithvik; Asha |

In this season, the scores per judge are out of 10 with the highest possible score of 30.
Red number indicates the lowest score.
Green number indicates the highest score.
indicates the couple eliminated that week.
indicates the returning couple that finished in the bottom three.
indicates the returning couple that finished in the bottom two.
indicates the winning couple.
indicates the runner-up couple.
indicates the third-place couple.

== Season 7 ==
Nach Baliye
- Season 7
- Presented by: Karan Patel; Rithvik Dhanjani
- Judges: Marzi Pestonji; Preity Zinta; Chetan Bhagat
- No. of contestants: 22
- Winners: Himmanshoo Malhotra; Amruta Khanvilkar
- Runners-up: Nandish Sandhu; Rashami Desai
- No. of episodes: 12 (Weekend); 40 (Daily Punchnama)

Release
- Original network: Star Plus
- Original release: 26 April – 19 July 2015

Series chronology
- ← Previous; Season 6 Next → Season 8

Nach Baliye 7 is the seventh season of the dance reality show, Nach Baliye.

It premiered on 26 April 2015 on Star Plus. The series was produced by Ekta Kapoor and Shobha Kapoor under their banner Balaji Telefilms. The series aired from Monday to Saturday nights and on Sunday evenings. The season ended on 19 July 2015.

It was hosted by Rithvik Dhanjani and Karan Patel. Marzi Pestonji, Preity Zinta and Chetan Bhagat were the judges.

Kunwar Amar, Karanvir Bohra, Mukti Mohan, Sargun Mehta and Salman Yusuf Khan also appeared in a special episode.

=== Contestants ===
| | Contestants | | Status | Ref |
|---|---|---|---|---|
| C1 | Himmanshu Malhotra | Amruta Khanvilkar | Winners on 19 July 2015 | |
| C2 | Nandish Sandhu | Rashami Desai | 1st runners-up on 19 July 2015 | |
| C3 | Upen Patel | Karishma Tanna | 2nd runners-up on 19 July 2015 | |
| C4 | Mayuresh Wadkar | Ajisha Shah | 3rd runners-up on 19 July 2015 | |
| C5 | Deepesh Sharma | Sana Saeed | Eliminated 9th on 5 July 2015 | |
| C6 | Rohit Nag | Aishwarya Sakhuja | Eliminated 8th on 28 June 2015 | |
| C7 | Parag Tyagi | Shefali Jariwala | Eliminated 7th on 21 June 2015 | |
| C8 | Sharad Tripathi | Mrunal Thakur | Eliminated 6th on 14 June 2015 | |
| C9 | Sangram Singh | Payal Rohatgi | Eliminated 5th on 7 June 2015 | |
| C10 | Arpit Ranka | Nidhi Ranka | Eliminated 4th on 31 May 2015 | |
| C11 | Jay Soni | Pooja Soni | Eliminated 3rd on 24 May 2015 | |
| C12 | Shakti Arora | Neha Saxena | Quit 2nd on 10 May 2015 | |
| C13 | Vineet Bhangera | Smiley Suri | Eliminated 1st on 3 May 2015 | |

=== Scoring chart ===
| Couple | Week 1 | | Week 2 | Week 3 | Week 4 | Week 5 | Week 6 | Week 7 | Week 8 | Week 9 | Week 10 | | | Week 11 | Week 12 | |
|---|---|---|---|---|---|---|---|---|---|---|---|---|---|---|---|---|
| Himmanshu | 29 | 25 | 28 | 29 | 26 | 30 | 29 | 25 | 26 | 30 | Karanvir | 26 | 28 | 38 | —N/a | Winner |
| Amruta | 29 | 25 | 28 | 29 | 26 | 30 | 29 | 25 | 26 | 30 | Karanvir | 26 | 28 | 38 | —N/a | Winner |
| Nandish | 25 | 26 | 26 | 25 | 29 | 24 | 22 | 26 | 27 | 27 | Sargun | 26 | 29 | 40 | —N/a | ''1st runner-up'' |
| Rashami | 25 | 26 | 26 | 25 | 29 | 24 | 22 | 26 | 27 | 27 | Sargun | 26 | 29 | 40 | —N/a | ''1st runner-up'' |
| Upen | 26 | 28 | 29 | 26 | 24 | 25 | 25 | 27 | 26 | 30 | Salman | 29 | 25 | 36 | —N/a | ''2nd runner-up'' |
| Karishma | 26 | 28 | 29 | 26 | 24 | 25 | 25 | 27 | 26 | 30 | Salman | 29 | 25 | 36 | —N/a | ''2nd runner-up'' |
| Mayuresh | Not in Competition | | | | | | | 27 | 30 | 30 | Amar | 31 | 30 | 38 | —N/a | ''3rd runner-up'' |
| Ajisha | Not in Competition | | | | | | | 27 | 30 | 30 | Amar | 31 | 30 | 38 | —N/a | ''3rd runner-up'' |
| Deepesh | 25 | 26 | 29 | 27 | 22 | Eliminated | | 27 | 25 | 28 | Mukti | 27 | 27 | Eliminated | | |
| Sana | 25 | 26 | 29 | 27 | 22 | Eliminated | | 27 | 25 | 28 | Mukti | 27 | 27 | Eliminated | | |
| Rohit | 24 | 23 | 25 | 22 | 25 | 28 | 21 | 27 | 24 | 24 | Eliminated | | | | | |
| Aishwarya | 24 | 23 | 25 | 22 | 25 | 28 | 21 | 27 | 24 | 24 | Eliminated | | | | | |
| Parag | Not in Competition | | | | | | | 26 | 21 | Eliminated | | | | | | |
| Shefali | Not in Competition | | | | | | | 26 | 21 | Eliminated | | | | | | |
| Sharad | 24 | 27 | 26 | 22 | 26 | 26 | 27 | 21 | Eliminated | | | | | | | |
| Mrunal | 24 | 27 | 26 | 22 | 26 | 26 | 27 | 21 | Eliminated | | | | | | | |
| Sangram | 22 | 25 | 24 | 26 | 24 | 28 | 20 | Eliminated | | | | | | | | |
| Payal | 22 | 25 | 24 | 26 | 24 | 28 | 20 | Eliminated | | | | | | | | |
| Arpit | 22 | 26 | 26 | 24 | 25 | 25 | Eliminated | | | | | | | | | |
| Nidhi | 22 | 26 | 26 | 24 | 25 | 25 | Eliminated | | | | | | | | | |
| Jay | 25 | 28 | 26 | 23 | 22 | Eliminated | | | | | | | | | | |
| Pooja | 25 | 28 | 26 | 23 | 22 | Eliminated | | | | | | | | | | |
| Shakti | 26 | 27 | 30 | Quit | | | | | | | | | | | | |
| Neha | 26 | 27 | 30 | Quit | | | | | | | | | | | | |
| Vineet | 24 | 25 | Eliminated | | | | | | | | | | | | | |
| Smilie | 24 | 25 | Eliminated | | | | | | | | | | | | | |
| Bottom | None | Sangram-Payal; Vineet-Smilie | Rohit-Aishwarya; Sangram-Payal | None | Deepesh-Sana; Jay-Pooja | Arpit-Nidhi; Upen-Karishma | Sangram-Payal; Rohit-Aishwarya | Himmanshu-Amruta; Sharad-Mrunal | Parag-Shefali; Rohit-Aishwarya | Nandish-Rashami; Rohit-Aishwarya | Deepesh-Sana; Upen-Karishma | | | Mayuresh-Ajisha; Upen-Karishma | Finalists | |
| Bottom | None | Sangram-Payal; Vineet-Smilie | Rohit-Aishwarya; Sangram-Payal | None | Deepesh-Sana; Jay-Pooja | Arpit-Nidhi; Upen-Karishma | Sangram-Payal; Rohit-Aishwarya | Himmanshu-Amruta; Sharad-Mrunal | Parag-Shefali; Rohit-Aishwarya | Nandish-Rashami; Rohit-Aishwarya | Deepesh-Sana; Upen-Karishma | | | Mayuresh-Ajisha; Upen-Karishma | Himmanshu-Amruta; Mayuresh-Ajisha; Nandish-Rashami; Upen-Karishma | |
| Re-entered | None | | | | | | | Depeesh; Sana | None | | | | | | | |
| Quit | None | | Shakti; Neha | None | | | | | | | | | | | | |
| Eliminated | | Vineet; Smilie | No; Elimination | No; Elimination | Jay; Pooja | Arpit; Nidhi | Sangram; Payal | Sharad; Mrunal | Parag; Shefali | Rohit; Aishwarya | Deepesh; Sana | | | No; Elimination | Mayuresh; Ajisha | Karishma; Upen |
| Eliminated | | Vineet; Smilie | No; Elimination | No; Elimination | Jay; Pooja | Arpit; Nidhi | Sangram; Payal | Sharad; Mrunal | Parag; Shefali | Rohit; Aishwarya | Deepesh; Sana | | | No; Elimination | Nandish; Rashami | Himmanshu; Amruta |
| Eliminated | | Vineet; Smilie | No; Elimination | No; Elimination | Sana; Deepesh | Arpit; Nidhi | Sangram; Payal | Sharad; Mrunal | Parag; Shefali | Rohit; Aishwarya | Deepesh; Sana | | | No; Elimination | Nandish; Rashami | Himmanshu; Amruta |

In this season, the scores per judge are out of 10 with the highest possible score of 30.
Red number indicates the lowest score.
Green number indicates the highest score.
Eliminated
Bottom three
Bottom two
Winning couple
Runner-up couple
Second runner-up couple

== Season 8 ==
Nach Baliye
- Season 8
- Presented by: Karan Tacker; Upasana Singh
- Judges: Sonakshi Sinha; Mohit Suri; Terence Lewis
- No. of contestants: 20
- Winners: Vivek Dahiya; Divyanka Tripathi
- Runners-up: Sanam Johar; Abigail Jain
- No. of episodes: 17

Release
- Original network: Star Plus
- Original release: 2 April – 24 June 2017

Series chronology
- ← Previous; Season 7 Next → Season 9

Nach Baliye 8 is the eighth season of the dance reality show, Nach Baliye.

It premiered on 2 April 2017 on Star Plus. The show was produced by BBC Worldwide. Sonakshi Sinha, Terence Lewis and Mohit Suri were the judges. Karan Tacker and Upasana Singh were the hosts for the show. Vivek Dahiya and Divyanka Tripathi were declared as the winners.

=== Contestants ===
| | Contestants | | Status | Ref |
|---|---|---|---|---|
| C1 | Vivek Dahiya | Divyanka Tripathi | Winners on 25 June 2017 | |
| C2 | Sanam Johar | Abigail Jain | 1st runners-up on 25 June 2017 | |
| C3 | Mohit Sehgal | Sanaya Irani | 2nd runners-up on 25 June 2017 | |
| C4 | Shoaib Ibrahim | Dipika Kakar | Eliminated 12th on 17 June 2017 | |
| C5 | Siddhartha Jadhav | Trupti Akkalwar | Eliminated 11th on 11 June 2017 | |
| C6 | Brent Goble | Aashka Goradia | Eliminated 9th on 4 June 2017 | |
| C7 | Haarsh Limbachiyaa | Bharti Singh | Eliminated 7th on 21 May 2017 | |
| C8 | Vikrant Singh | Antara Biswas | Eliminated 5th on 7 May 2017 | |
| C9 | Pritam Singh | Amanjot Kaur | Eliminated 4th on 30 April 2017 | |
| C10 | Manoj Verma | Utkarsha Naik | Eliminated 1st on 16 April 2017 | |

=== Guests ===
- Salman Khan and Sohail Khan
- Ranbir Kapoor
- Arjun Kapoor and Shraddha Kapoor
- Arjun Kapoor and Anil Kapoor
- Sridevi
- Hrithik Roshan
- Diljit Dosanjh
- Sonam Bajwa
- Parineeti Chopra
- Remo D'souza
- Karan Patel

=== Scoring chart ===
| Couple | Week 1 | Week 2 | Week 3 | Week 4 | Week 5 | Week 6 | Week 7 | Week 8 | | Week 9 | Week 10 | | Week 11 | Week 12 | |
|---|---|---|---|---|---|---|---|---|---|---|---|---|---|---|---|
| Vivek | 24 | 24 | 29 | 24 | 26 | 29 | 30 | Vaibhav | 28 | 37/40 | 26 | 30 | 25 | —N/a | Winner |
| Divyanka | 24 | 24 | 29 | 24 | 26 | 29 | 30 | Vaibhav | 28 | 37/40 | 26 | 30 | 25 | —N/a | Winner |
| Sanam | 25 | 26 | 26 | 30 | 30 | 30 | 30 | Khushboo | 30 | 33/40 | 30 | 30 | 29 | —N/a | 1st runner-up |
| Abigail | 25 | 26 | 26 | 30 | 30 | 30 | 30 | Khushboo | 30 | 33/40 | 30 | 30 | 29 | —N/a | 1st runner-up |
| Mohit | 22 | 25 | 28 | 29 | 29 | 30 | 24 | Nishant | 30 | 39/40 | 30 | 30 | 29 | —N/a | 2nd runner-up |
| Sanaya | 22 | 25 | 28 | 29 | 29 | 30 | 24 | Nishant | 30 | 39/40 | 30 | 30 | 29 | —N/a | 2nd runner-up |
| Shoaib | 24 | 25 | 27 | 26 | 27 | 26 | 30 | Yash | 24 | 38/40 | 25 | 30 | 24 | Eliminated | |
| Dipika | 24 | 25 | 27 | 26 | 27 | 26 | 30 | Yash | 24 | 38/40 | 25 | 30 | 24 | Eliminated | |
| Siddhartha | 24 | 26 | 30 | Eliminated | | | 19 | Omkar | 28 | 35/40 | 26 | Eliminated | | | |
| Trupti | 24 | 26 | 30 | Eliminated | | | 19 | Omkar | 28 | 35/40 | 26 | Eliminated | | | |
| Brent | 25 | 26 | 28 | 26 | 29 | 25 | 17 | Sneha | 27 | 40/40 | Eliminated | | | | |
| Aashka | 25 | 26 | 28 | 26 | 29 | 25 | 17 | Sneha | 27 | 40/40 | Eliminated | | | | |
| Haarsh | 25 | 27 | 25 | 27 | 29 | 25 | 16 | | | | | | | | |
| Bharti | 25 | 27 | 25 | 27 | 29 | 25 | 16 | | | | | | | | |
| Vikrant | 24 | 26 | 27 | 25 | 21 | Eliminated | 16 | | | | | | | | |
| Antara | 24 | 26 | 27 | 25 | 21 | Eliminated | 16 | | | | | | | | |
| Pritam | 28 | 30 | 22 | 25 | Eliminated | | 15 | | | | | | | | |
| Amanjot | 28 | 30 | 22 | 25 | Eliminated | | 15 | | | | | | | | |
| Manoj | 23 | 23 | Eliminated | | | | 15 | | | | | | | | |
| Utkarsha | 23 | 23 | Eliminated | | | | 15 | | | | | | | | |
| Notes | —N/a | | 1 | 2 | —N/a | | | | | —N/a | | | —N/a | | |
| Bottom | None | Manoj-Utkarsha; Vikrant-Antara | Brent-Aashka; Siddhartha-Trupti | Vikrant-Antara; Priam-Amanjot | Brent-Aashka; Vikrant-Antara | Brent-Aashka; Shoaib-Dipika | Haarsh-Bharti; Mohit-Sanaya | None | | Brent-Aashka; Siddhartha-Trupti | Mohit-Sanaya; Siddhartha-Trupti | | Sanam-Abigail; Shoaib-Dipika | Finalists | |
| Bottom | None | Manoj-Utkarsha; Vikrant-Antara | Brent-Aashka; Siddhartha-Trupti | Vikrant-Antara; Priam-Amanjot | Brent-Aashka; Vikrant-Antara | Brent-Aashka; Shoaib-Dipika | Haarsh-Bharti; Mohit-Sanaya | None | | Brent-Aashka; Siddhartha-Trupti | Mohit-Sanaya; Siddhartha-Trupti | | Sanam-Abigail; Shoaib-Dipika | Mohit-Sanaya; Sanam-Abigail; Vivek-Divyanka | |
| Re-entered | None | | | | | | Brent; Aashka | None | | | | | | | |
| Re-entered | None | | | | | | Siddhartha; Trupti | None | | | | | | | |
| Eliminated | No; Elimination | Manoj; Utkarsha | Siddhartha; Trupti | Pritam; Amanjot | Vikrant; Antara | Brent; Aashka | Haarsh; Bharti | No; Elimination | | Brent; Aashka | Siddhartha; Trupti | | Shoaib; Dipika | Mohit; Sanaya | |
| Eliminated | No; Elimination | Manoj; Utkarsha | Siddhartha; Trupti | Pritam; Amanjot | Vikrant; Antara | Brent; Aashka | Haarsh; Bharti | No; Elimination | | Brent; Aashka | Siddhartha; Trupti | | Shoaib; Dipika | Sanam; Abigail | Vivek; Divyanka |

Red number Lowest score
Green number Highest score
Eliminated
Bottom two
Winning couple
Runner-up couple
Second runner-up

- The scores per judge were out of 10 with the highest possible score of 30.
- The elimination was based on public votes plus the score given by judges in the previous week.

==== Notes ====
- ^1 Divyanka couldn't perform in Week 3 because she was injured and a doctor had consulted her to take bed rest. Vivek asked the judges to allow him to perform with their choreographer Sonali. The judges allowed him but told him that they would neglect Sonali and would only see and judge him and give marks on that basis.
- ^2 Haarsh couldn't perform in Week 4 as he was injured and a doctor had advised him to take rest. Bharti asked the judges to allow her to perform with their choreographer Savio. The judges allowed them but told her that they would neglect Savio and would only see and judge her and give marks on that basis. Terrance also said this is the last where they would allow a contestant perform with their choreographer.

== Season 9 ==
Nach Baliye
- Season 9
- Presented by: Manish Paul; Waluscha De Sousa
- Judges: Ahmed Khan; Raveena Tandon
- No. of contestants: 28
- Winners: Prince Narula; Yuvika Chaudhary
- Runners-up: Rohit Reddy; Anita Hassanandani
- No. of episodes: 33

Release
- Original network: Star Plus
- Original release: 19 July – 3 November 2019

Series chronology
- ← Previous; Season 8 Next → Season 10

Nach Baliye 9 is the ninth season of the dance reality show, Nach Baliye.

It premiered on 19 July 2019. Produced by Salman Khan, it was judged by Raveena Tandon & Ahmed Khan and hosted by Manish Paul & Waluscha De Sousa.

Vighnesh Pande and his puppet character 'Anna' appeared as a comic relief for episodes featuring South Indian Megastar Prabhas and another with the Bollywood celebrity Sanjay Dutt.

The season was won by Prince Narula and Yuvika Chaudhary on 3 November 2019.

=== Contestants ===
| No | Contestants | | Status |
|---|---|---|---|
| C1 | Prince Narula | Yuvika Chaudhary | Winners |
| C2 | Rohit Reddy | Anita Hassanandani | 1st runners-up |
| C3 | Vishal Aditya Singh | Madhurima Tuli | 2nd runners-up |
| C3 | Vishal Aditya Singh | Madhurima Tuli | Eliminated |
| C4 | Aly Goni | Nataša Stanković | 3rd runners-up |
| C5 | Shantanu Maheshwari | Nityaami Shirke | 4th runners-up |
| C6 | Alam Makkar | Shraddha Arya | Eliminated |
| C7 | Sourabh Raaj Jain | Ridhima Jain | Eliminated |
| C7 | Sourabh Raaj Jain | Ridhima Jain | Eliminated |
| C8 | Anuj Sachdeva | Urvashi Dholakia | Eliminated |
| C9 | Avinash Sachdev | Palak Purswani | Eliminated |
| C10 | Sandeep Sejwal | Pooja Banerjee | Quit |
| C11 | Faisal Khan | Muskaan Kataria | Quit |
| C12 | Vivek Suhag | Babita Phogat | Eliminated |
| C13 | Vindu Dara Singh | Dina Umarova | Eliminated |
| C14 | Keith Sequeira | Rochelle Rao | Eliminated |

=== Scoring chart ===
| Couple | | Week 1 | Week 2 | Week 3 | Week 4 | Week 5 | Week 6 | Week 7 | Week 8 | Week 9 | Week 10 | Week 11 | Week 12 | Week 13 | Week 14 | Week 15 | |
| Prince | #PriVika | 100 | 89 | 82.5 | 85 | 100 | 100 | 87 | 98 | 100 | 89 | 95.5 | 74 | 89 | 95 | Winner | |
| Yuvika | #PriVika | 100 | 89 | 82.5 | 85 | 100 | 100 | 87 | 98 | 100 | 89 | 95.5 | 74 | 89 | 95 | Winner | |
| Rohit | #RoNita | 87.5 | Unwell | 100 | 94 | 100 | 100 | 87.5 | 88.5 | 97 | 100 | 94 | 81 | 99.25 | 96.3 | 1st runner-up | |
| Anita | #RoNita | 87.5 | Unwell | 100 | 94 | 100 | 100 | 87.5 | 88.5 | 97 | 100 | 94 | 81 | 99.25 | 96.3 | 1st runner-up | |
| Vishal | #ViRima | 100 | 92 | 100 | 85 | 93.5 | 80 | Eliminated | 100 | 89 | 0 | 97 | 90 | 89.75 | 95 | 2nd runner-up | |
| Madhurima | #ViRima | 100 | 92 | 100 | 85 | 93.5 | 80 | Eliminated | 100 | 89 | 0 | 97 | 90 | 89.75 | 95 | 2nd runner-up | |
| Aly | #AlyNa | 85 | 100 | 100 | 75 | 100 | 100 | 27.5 | 97 | 100 | 90 | 96.5 | 85.5 | 90.5 | 95 | 3rd runner-up | |
| Natasa | #AlyNa | 85 | 100 | 100 | 75 | 100 | 100 | 27.5 | 97 | 100 | 90 | 96.5 | 85.5 | 90.5 | 95 | 3rd runner-up | |
| Shantanu | #NiShan | 96 | 65 | 100 | 92 | 100 | 89 | 100 | 100 | 100 | 91.5 | 89.5 | 100 | 96.5 | 97.3 | 4th runner-up | |
| Nityaami | #NiShan | 96 | 65 | 100 | 92 | 100 | 89 | 100 | 100 | 100 | 91.5 | 89.5 | 100 | 96.5 | 97.3 | 4th runner-up | |
| Alam | #ShAlam | 77.5 | 100 | 84 | 97 | 87.5 | 91.5 | 100 | 100 | 89 | 93 | 90 | 96 | 96 | 92.5 | Eliminated | |
| Shraddha | #ShAlam | 77.5 | 100 | 84 | 97 | 87.5 | 91.5 | 100 | 100 | 89 | 93 | 90 | 96 | 96 | 92.5 | Eliminated | |
| Anuj | #UrUj | 81.5 | 85.5 | 90.5 | 91.5 | 92.5 | Eliminated | | 89.5 | 89 | 97.5 | 99 | 77 | Eliminated | | | |
| Urvashi | #UrUj | 81.5 | 85.5 | 90.5 | 91.5 | 92.5 | Eliminated | | 89.5 | 89 | 97.5 | 99 | 77 | Eliminated | | | |
| Sourabh | #SouRidhi | 66 | 70.5 | 86.5 | 93.5 | 100 | 82.5 | 90 | 90 | 100 | 100 | 94.5 | 81.5 | Eliminated | | | |
| Ridhima | #SouRidhi | 66 | 70.5 | 86.5 | 93.5 | 100 | 82.5 | 90 | 90 | 100 | 100 | 94.5 | 81.5 | Eliminated | | | |
| Avinash | #PaNash | Not in the Show | | | | | | | 89.5 | 87 | 83 | Eliminated | | | | | |
| Palak | #PaNash | Not in the Show | | | | | | | 89.5 | 87 | 83 | Eliminated | | | | | |
| Sandeep | #PooSa | Not in the Show | | | | | | | 80 | 1 | | | | | | | |
| Pooja | #PooSa | Not in the Show | | | | | | | 80 | 1 | | | | | | | |
| Faisal | #FaiSaan | 100 | 100 | 88 | 100 | 100 | 100 | 100 | Quit; Injury | | | | | | | | |
| Muskaan | #FaiSaan | 100 | 100 | 88 | 100 | 100 | 100 | 100 | Quit; Injury | | | | | | | | |
| Vivek | #BaVek | 100 | 100 | 90.5 | 85 | Eliminated | | | | | | | | | | | |
| Babita | #BaVek | 100 | 100 | 90.5 | 85 | Eliminated | | | | | | | | | | | |
| Vindu | #ViNa | 100 | 77.5 | 80 | Eliminated | | | | | | | | | | | | |
| Dina | #ViNa | 100 | 77.5 | 80 | Eliminated | | | | | | | | | | | | |
| Keith | #KeRo | 65.5 | 80.5 | Eliminated | | | | | | | | | | | | | |
| Rochelle | #KeRo | 65.5 | 80.5 | Eliminated | | | | | | | | | | | | | |
| Bottom | | None | Anuj-Urvashi; Keith-Rochelle | Anuj-Urvashi; Vindu-Dina | Anuj-Urvashi; Vivek-Babita | Anuj-Urvashi; Vishal-Madhurima | Alam-Shraddha; Vishal-Madhurima | None | None | Anuj-Urvashi; Avinash-Palak | None | Alam-Shraddha; Anuj-Urvashi; Sourabh-Ridhima | None | Alam-Shraddha; Vishal-Madhurima | Finalists | | |
| Bottom | | None | Anuj-Urvashi; Keith-Rochelle | Anuj-Urvashi; Vindu-Dina | Anuj-Urvashi; Vivek-Babita | Anuj-Urvashi; Vishal-Madhurima | Alam-Shraddha; Vishal-Madhurima | None | None | Anuj-Urvashi; Avinash-Palak | None | Alam-Shraddha; Anuj-Urvashi; Sourabh-Ridhima | None | Alam-Shraddha; Vishal-Madhurima | Aly-Natasa; Prince-Yuvika; Rohit-Anita; Shantanu-Nityaami; Vishal-Madhurima | | |
| Re-entered | | None | | | | | | | Anuj; Urvashi | None | | | | | | | |
| Re-entered | | None | | | | | | | Vishal; Madhurima | None | | | | | | | |
| Quit | | None | | | | | | Faisal; Muskaan | Sandeep; Pooja | None | | | | | | | |
| Eliminated | | No; Elimination | Keith; Rochelle | Vindu; Dina | Vivek; Babita | Anuj; Urvashi | Vishal; Madhurima | No; Elimination | | Avinash; Palak | No; Elimination | Anuj; Urvashi | No; Elimination | Alam; Shraddha | Shantanu; Nityaami | Aly; Natasa | Vishal; Madhurima |
| Eliminated | | No; Elimination | Keith; Rochelle | Vindu; Dina | Vivek; Babita | Anuj; Urvashi | Vishal; Madhurima | No; Elimination | | Avinash; Palak | No; Elimination | Sourabh; Ridhima | No; Elimination | Alam; Shraddha | Rohit; Anita | Prince; Yuvika | |

Current Couple
Former Couple

Red number Lowest score
Green number Highest score
Eliminated
Bottom Two
Winners
Runner-ups
Second runner-ups
Hi5
Unwell

- The scores per judge were out of 100. Then the average score is calculated from the scores of both judges.
- The elimination was based on public votes and the score given by judges.
- In Week 2, Rohit and Anita did not perform as Rohit was down with Jaundice so the doctor had advised rest to him. Ahmed and Raveena saved them and they advanced to the next week without nomination.
- In Week 7, Faisal & Muskaan had to quit the show as Faisal got injured.
- In Week 9, Pooja & Sandeep had to quit the show as Pooja got injured.
- In Week 11, The couples had to perform solo. Ridhima, Prince, Anuj, Shraddha and Vishal got a High 5, however both the partners had to score 50/50 to receive a High 5.
- In week 12, every couple has to perform twice. In the first round they are getting marks out of 90. And the second round is battle between two couple. Whoever wins will get 10 marks & other get zero.
- In Quarter Finale (Week 13) also, the couples had to perform twice. In first round, they performed with different dance groups and got marks out of 100. The couples who received a High 5 were RoNita, NiShaan and ShAlam. In second round, they performed their usual performances (Theme-Retro )and got marks out of 100.The average of both the rounds was taken as their final score.
- In Semi Finale (Week 14) also, the couples had to perform twice.
