= Kairi: Rishta Khatta Meetha =

- Genre: Drama
- Created by: Sumeet Hukamchand Mittal; Shashi Mittal
- Written by: Raghuvir Shekhawat, Manish Shrivastav, Ambika Kumar & Sharad Tripathi
- Directed by: Deepak Chavan, Yash Chauhan & Kamal Monga with Creatives- Tanvesh Jain, Karishmaa Chandna, Manoj Sharma
- Starring: See Below
- Country of origin: India
- Original language: Hindi
- No. of seasons: 1
- No. of episodes: 187

Production
- Producers: Shashi Mittal; Sumeet Hukamchand Mittal
- Cinematography: Sudesh Kotian
- Production company: Shashi Sumeet Productions

Original release
- Network: Colors TV
- Release: 2 April – 14 December 2012

Kairi — Rishta Khatta Meetha (transl. A Sweet Sour Relationship Like An Unripe Mango) is an Indian soap opera which was aired on Colors TV and was based on the dictatorship of a mother-in-law. It aired from 2 April 2012 to 14 December 2012. Later, it was dubbed in Tamil as 'Neelambari' on Makkal TV.

== Cast ==
- Preeti Choudary as Ambika Anuj Shrivastav a.k.a. Ambi
- Jay Bhanushali / Naman Shaw as Anuj Ashok Shrivastav
- Saurabh Dubey as Ashok Shrivastav
- Hema Singh as Imarti Ashok Shrivastav
- Abhinav Kohli as Prakash Ashok Shrivastav
- Dipti Dhyani as Kusum Prakash Shrivastav
- Meet Mukhi as Sonu Prakash Shrivastav
- Bharat Kumwali as Ved Ashok Shrivastav
- Roshani Shetty as Sajni Ved Shrivastav a.k.a. Lalli Lipstick
- Naman Shaw as Abhay Ashok Shrivastav (dead)
- Vibha Anand as Suman Abhay Shrivastav
- Gaurav Sharma – Sunny Ashok Shrivastav
- Anjali Raghav (actress) – Sweety Ashok Shrivastav
- Sandesh Naik as Shrichand Shrivastav
- Sangeeta Panwar as Bimla Shrichand Shrivastav
- Ankita Dubey as Vibha Shrichand Shrivastav
- Neelum Gandhi as Babli Shrichand Shrivastav
- Mezbin Seikh as Neetu
- Janvi Sanghvan as Kalavati
- Sarmili Raj as Kamini
- Pramatesh Mehta as Kamal Saxena
- Leena Jumani as Mala
- Poonam Bhatia as Mishrain
- Shankar Mishra as Kishorilal
- Dipika Kakar

== Awards ==
- Indian Television Academy Awards – Best Actress In A Negative Role – Hema Singh
- Colors Golden Petal Awards – Most Tez Taraar Personality – Hema Singh
