= Tushar Pandey =

Indian actor

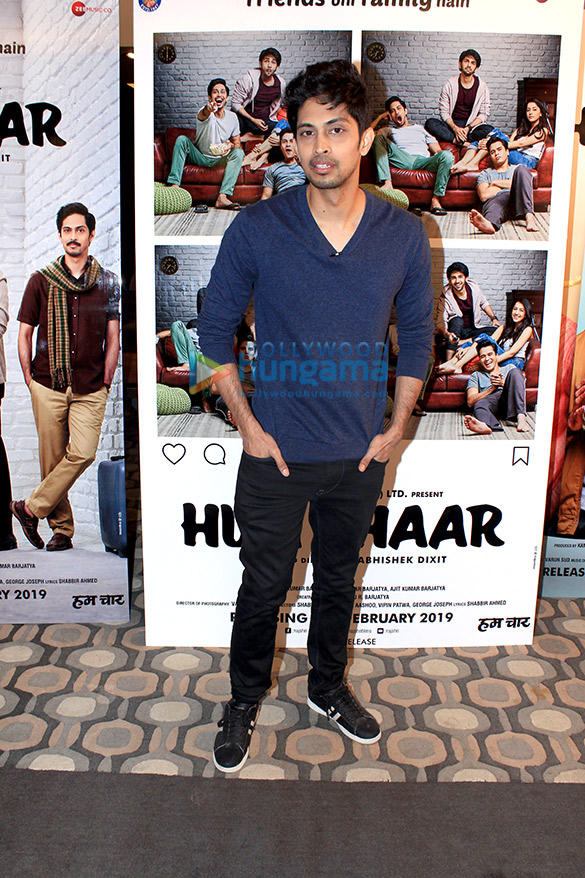
- Pandey at the promotions of his film Hum Chaar in 2019
- Born: 22 November 1991 (age 34); New Delhi, India
- Education: London International School of Performing Arts; National School of Drama; Kirori Mal College
- Occupation: Actor
- Years active: 2015–present
- Known for: Chhichhore (2019); Aashram (2020)

Tushar Pandey (born 22 November 1991) is an Indian actor working predominantly in Bollywood. Graduate of National School of Drama and London International School of Performing Arts, he is best known for his role of Mummy in the 2019 film Chhichhore. Pandey debuted in 2015 in the psychological thriller Beyond Blue: An Unnerving Tale of a Demented Mind which premiered at the Marché du Film in 68th annual Cannes Film Festival.

== Early life and education ==
Tushar Pandey was born on 22 November 1991 and brought up in Delhi, India. Tushar's interest in performing arts began during his school days at Montfort Senior Secondary School. He participated in stage plays, music and sports competitions throughout his school years. After finishing school he got admission in English (H) at Kirori Mal College through the special theatre admission (selection for exceptional talent in arts) and was part of 'The Players', theatre society of the college.

Tushar's professional training and career started at the National School of Drama, one of the most prestigious theatre schools in Asia. Furthermore, he is trained in physical theatre and finished his advanced training from London International School of Performing Arts, London and was awarded Inlaks Shivadasani Foundation International Scholarship.

== Acting career ==
Tushar's first film appearance was in Rang De Basanti, as one of the students auditioning for a documentary role. He acted in a supporting role in 2016 acclaimed film Pink alongside Amitabh Bachchan and Taapsee Pannu. In 2019, Rajshri Productions launched him in a lead role in their youth film Hum Chaar. Same year, he was seen in Chhichhore, alongside Sushant Singh Rajput and Shraddha Kapoor. The film was directed by Nitesh Tiwari and became one of the big hits of the year.

== Filmography ==
Key
†	Denotes films that have not yet been released

Year	Title	Role	Language	Notes	Ref(s)
2006	Rang De Basanti	Auditioner	side role		
2015	Phantom	Ashraf Ali	Hindi	Film debut	
2016	Pink	VishwaJyoti Ghosh	Hindi		
2017	Bisht Please	Donny	Hindi / English	Mini-series	
2019	Hum Chaar	Surjo Pandey	Hindi		
2019	Chhichhore	Sundar "Mummy" Srivastava	Hindi		
2020	Kaande Pohe	Sanjay	Hindi	Short film	
2020	Aashram	Satti	Hindi	MX Player series	
2022	Titu Ambani	Titu	Hindi	Jio Cinema	
2023	Lost	Ishaan Bharti	Hindi	Zee5 film	
2026	Sankalp	Satyaveer Mishra	Hindi	MX Player series	
TBA	Homecoming †	Shubho	Bengali/Hindi/English	Filming	
2023	Staffroom	Anurag Bakshi	Hindi /English	Amazon Mini	
