= Chhichhore =

2019 Indian film by Nitesh Tiwari

- Theatrical release poster
- Directed by: Nitesh Tiwari
- Written by: Nitesh Tiwari; Piyush Gupta; Nikhil Mehrotra
- Produced by: Sajid Nadiadwala
- Starring: Sushant Singh Rajput; Shraddha Kapoor; Varun Sharma; Naveen Polishetty; Tushar Pandey; Tahir Raj Bhasin; Prateik Babbar; Shishir Sharma; Mohammad Samad
- Cinematography: Amalendu Chaudhary
- Edited by: Charu Shree Roy
- Music by: Songs: Pritam; Background Score: Sameer Uddin
- Production company: Nadiadwala Grandson Entertainment
- Distributed by: Fox Star Studios
- Release date: September 6, 2019
- Running time: 143 minutes
- Country: India
- Language: Hindi
- Budget: ₹50 crore (US$5.2 million)
- Box office: est. ₹215.41 crore (US$22 million)

Chhichhore (transl. Frivolous) is a 2019 Indian Hindi-language coming-of-age comedy-drama directed by Nitesh Tiwari in association with Piyush Gupta and Nikhil Mehrotra, and produced by Sajid Nadiadwala under Nadiadwala Grandson Entertainment, with Fox Star Studios acquiring the distribution rights. Based on Tiwari's experiences as a student of the Indian Institute of Technology, Bombay, the film stars Sushant Singh Rajput, Shraddha Kapoor, Varun Sharma, Naveen Polishetty (in his Hindi Debut), Tahir Raj Bhasin, Tushar Pandey and Saharsh Kumar Shukla in the lead roles, with Shishir Sharma and Mohammad Samad in supporting roles.

Set parallelly in the 1990s and 2019, Chhichhore tells the story of Aniruddh Pathak, a middle-aged divorced man whose son, Raghav, tries to commit suicide after failing to clear the JEE entrance examination, and who, despite survival, is unwilling to live due to the fear of being branded as a "loser", which makes a desperate Anniruddh recount his own experience to Raghav of his own time at college, wherein he and his five friends too were called 'losers', and how they managed to remove that tag; as he continues along to narrate his story, the other five join their friend and complete the story.

Principal photography commenced in September 2018. Chhichhore was released on 6 September 2019, receiving positive reviews from critics. Earning ₹215 crores (₹2150 million/$28 million) worldwide to emerge as a blockbuster, it went on to receive the National Film Award for Best Feature Film in Hindi at the 67th National Film Awards announced in 2021. It also received five nominations at the 65th Filmfare Awards – Best Film, Best Director for Tiwari, Best Story, Best Dialogue and Best Editing. It marks Rajput's penultimate film appearance during his lifetime and before his death on 14 June 2020.

== Plot ==
Anirudh "Anni" Pathak is a divorced, middle-aged man living with his teenage son, Raghav, an aspiring student anxiously awaiting the results of the highly competitive engineering entrance examination. When the results are announced, a devastated Raghav discovers he has failed to qualify. Overwhelmed by the paralyzing fear of being permanently stigmatized as a "loser"—a label he believes his accomplished parents never faced—Raghav attempts suicide by jumping from a balcony. He survives the fall but is hospitalized in critical condition. As his medical team, led by Dr. Kasbekar, struggles to stabilize him, Anni realizes that Raghav is rapidly losing the will to live, causing his vitals to plummet. Desperate to revive his son's spirit, Anni begins recounting his own undergraduate days, determined to prove that failure is merely a detour rather than a final destination.

In 1992, a young Anni joins the prestigious National College of Technology and is assigned to Hostel 4 (H4), a residential block notoriously designated as the residence of the campus "Losers." There, he quickly integrates with a colorful group of eccentric misfits: Gurmeet "Sexa" Singh Dhillon, a hyper-sexual senior; Himanshu "Acid" Deshmukh, an aggressive foul-mouthed student; Sundar "Mummy" Srivastava, an overprotected, naive freshman; Harish "Bevda" Saxena, a brilliant senior perpetually incapacitated by alcoholism; and Derek, the brooding, highly competitive hostel leader. Anni also falls in love with Maya, the most popular girl on campus.

Despite their dismal reputation, the H4 residents form a tight-knit brotherhood. Tired of the relentless humiliation orchestrated by Raggie, the arrogant leader of the elite Hostel 3 (H3), the H4 group resolves to shed their derogatory label by competing fiercely in the college's annual General Championship (GC). H3 traditionally dominates the tournament through athletic superiority and systematic intimidation.

Recognising their physical disadvantage, the H4 team adopts unconventional strategies during the sporting events, including distracting the H3 athletes and making use of Bevda's chess ability. Aju and the other hostel residents support the team as H4 advances to the tournament final against H3. In the final basketball match, Anni misses the final shot, resulting in a narrow victory for H3. Despite losing the tournament, H4 earns the respect of the other students, challenging its residents' reputation as "losers".

In the present timeline, Anni’s storytelling is augmented by the unexpected arrival of Maya and the entire old H4 gang at the hospital, who have reunited after decades to support Raghav. Together, the group confesses to the youth that despite their historical losses, academic struggles, and subsequent real-world failures, none of them ever contemplated ending their lives. They passionately emphasize to Raghav that the absolute sincerity of one's effort, rather than the final result, dictates a person's true worth.

Deeply inspired by the collective vulnerability and resilience of his father's generation, Raghav internalizes the lesson and regains his psychological will to survive, allowing the doctors to successfully perform a critical, high-risk surgery. A year later, a fully recovered Raghav begins his freshman year at a new university. Free from the crushing anxiety of perfectionism, he steps onto campus choosing to focus on experiencing life to its absolute fullest, entirely unburdened by institutional rankings or societal labels.

== Cast ==
- Sushant Singh Rajput as Anniruddh "Anni" Pathak
- Shraddha Kapoor as Maya Sharma Pathak (Anni's love interest and later wife and Ex-Wife)
- Varun Sharma as Gurmeet "Sexa" Singh Dhillon (Anni's hypersexual senior who is obsessed with adult content)
- Naveen Polishetty as Himanshu "Acid" Deshmukh (Anni and Mummy's senior and Sexa's classmate who has developed a bitter and swearing tongue)
- Tushar Pandey as Sundar "Mummy" Srivastava (Anni's classmate who is tied to his mother's apron strings but is a talented carrom player)
- Tahir Raj Bhasin as Derek D’Souza (Anni, Mummy, Acid and Sexa's senior, who has great athletic skills and is a chain smoker)
- Saharsh Kumar Shukla as Sahil "Bevda" Awasthi (Anni, Mummy, Acid and Sexa's super-senior who is an alcohol addict and a known chess champion)
- Prateik Smita Patil as Raghuvir "Raggie" Chalkar (leader of H3 who detests Anni and Derek)
- Mohammad Samad as Raghav Pathak (Anni's and Maya's son)
- Shishir Sharma as Dr. S. D. Kasbekar, Raghav's doctor
- Nalneesh Neel as Pandu Singh (Chef in the H4 mess)
- Abhilasha Patil as the Head Nurse treating Raghav
- Saanand Verma as H4 Staff Member
- Gautam Ahuja as Rajveer, Raghav's friend
- Aashray Batra as Raghav's senior
- Rohit Chauhan as H4 Chris Cross (who has trouble with his eyesight but is a good bowler)
- Neil Dhokte as H3 Maradona
- Akshay Neb as H3 Pele
- Abishek Joseph George as Venkatesh Naidu a.k.a. "Venky" (Raggie's friend and a hostelite in H3)
- Major Rudrashish Majumder as H4 Heron Freshie
- Nitin Kumar Singh as H4 Mermaid Freshie
- Ranjan Raj as Abhimanyu "Danda" Rathore (Anni's hostel friend in H4 who is chosen to contest for the hostel in a 42 kg weightlifting tournament)
- Raziya Sultana as Dulari Pitroda, Maya's hostel friend in H10, who competes with Danda in the 42 kg weightlifting tournament
- Adarsh Gautam as Jitendra Singh Dhillon (Sexa's father)
- Sanjay Goradia as Amit Srivastava (Mummy's father)
- Vishal Gupta as H4 Asthma Kabaddi player
- Prasad Jawade as a Father on the train
- Kamaal Malik as Professor Mishra
- Anud Singh Dhaka as an H4 Student
- Dheeraj Shaji as Hostel Staff
- Nishad Mandalkar as Football Referee

== Production ==
Chhichhore is inspired by writer-director Nitesh Tiwari's own experiences of college life as a metallurgical engineering student at the Indian Institute of Technology, Bombay, his alma-mater, which is depicted in the film as the 'National College of Technology'; although not completely biographical in nature, it features character sketches loosely inspired by Tiwari himself as protagonist Aniruddha Pathak, as well as some of his closest friends and seniors. Some of the scenes were incorporated from the lives of co-writers Piyush Gupta and Nikhil Mehrotra, who worked under Tiwari at Leo Burnett.

Filming began on 30 September 2018, and first schedule was wrapped on 30 October 2018. The second schedule started on 14 November 2018 and wrapped on 15 December 2018. Major portions of the film were shot at IIT Bombay. The theme song was shot at a cost of ₹9 crores (₹90 million). This marked the reunion of choreographers Bosco–Caesar after three years. Shane Nigam was supposed to play the role of a Malayali student, but opted out due to scheduling conflicts with Kumbalangi Nights; he was subsequently replaced by newcomer Abhishek Joseph George.

== Marketing and release ==
Over the close of February 2019, the cast of the film donned their characters' costume video on the making of the poster on 30 May 2019.

The film was theatrically released in India on 6 September 2019. It was screened at 51st International Film Festival of India in January 2021 in the Indian Panorama section.

The film had a theatrical release in China on 7 January 2022, the first in two years following a de facto ban on Indian films there due to the 2020–2021 China–India skirmishes.

=== Home video ===
Later, it was released on Video on demand on Hotstar on 1 November 2019.

== Soundtrack ==
Chhichhore

Soundtrack album by Pritam
- Released: 31 August 2019
- Recorded: 2018–2019
- Genre: Feature film soundtrack
- Length: 29:25
- Language: Hindi
- Label: T-Series

Pritam chronology
Kalank (2019)	Chhichhore (2019)	The Sky Is Pink (2019)
External audio
- Audio Jukebox on YouTube

The soundtrack to the film was composed by Pritam, while the lyrics were written by Amitabh Bhattacharya, marking their second collaboration with Tiwari after Dangal (2016). Sameer Uddin composed the background score.

Track listing
No.	Title	Singer(s)	Length
1.	"Woh Din"	Arijit Singh	4:18
2.	"Khairiyat"	Arijit Singh	4:40
3.	"Kal Ki Hi Baat Hai"	KK	4:00
4.	"Fikar Not"	Nakash Aziz, Dev Negi, Antara Mitra, Amit Mishra, Sreerama Chandra, Amitabh Bhattacharya	3:09
5.	"Control"	Nakash Aziz, Manish J. Tipu, Geet Sagar, Sreerama Chandra, Amitabh Bhattacharya	3:36
6.	"Woh Din" (Film Version)	Tushar Joshi	5:12
7.	"Khairiyat" (Bonus Track)	Arijit Singh	4:30
Total length:			29:25

== Reception ==
=== Critical response ===
Sukanya Verma reviewing for Rediff felt that Chhichhore offered "too good a time to pay attention to its faults", giving the film 3.5 out of 4 stars. Sreeparna Sengupta of The Times of India gave the film 3.5 stars out of 5, praising the performances of Sushant Singh Rajput, Shraddha Kapoor, Varun Sharma and Tahir Raj Bhasin. Sengupta noted that the screenplay was predictable and the pace was slow, but the film had a theme of academic success that connected with youngsters and parents, writing that, "it [Chhichhore] tells you that the journey is far more important than the destination and that losing is as critical a life lesson as winning. The film scores high on many accounts and is certainly worth watching." Monika Rawal Kukreja from Hindustan Times wrote that, "the Sushant Singh Rajput-Shraddha Kapoor film takes you on a nostalgia trip to your college days with an engaging narrative and flashback sequences". Rahul Desai of Film Companion praised the film, calling it a "solid, homegrown college movie for the ages", further adding that, "Chhichhore is a hoot, but it's not flawless. Eventually though, it's Tiwari's understanding of mainstream emotional dynamics that tide the missteps over to frame an enjoyable film". Rajeev Masand, reviewing for News18 gave the film 3.5 stars out of 5, calling it [Chhichhore] "good, harmless fun". Bollywood Hungama in its review wrote that, "on the whole, the Sushant Singh Rajput Shraddha Kapoor starrer Chhichhore is a decent entertainer that has its share of touching scenes", while giving it 3.5/5 stars. Prachita Pandey of DNA gave the film 3.5 stars out of 5, noting that, " 'Chhichhore' drives home the point that in life's battles between winning and losing, the most important thing is 'life' itself" while praising the film for initiating the viewers on "a nostalgia trip". Udita Jhunjhunwala while reviewing for Mint praised the film by calling it a "lively homage to hostel life"; moreover praising the film's humor, she called it "organic". The Economic Times gave the movie 3.5/5 stars, calling it a "likeable film with relevant social message", further adding that the movie contains "plenty of nostalgia and warm, feel-good moments, several frat boy jokes, and some genuinely laugh-out-loud moments".

The film found criticism from Rachel Saltz of The New York Times who called the film to be "programmatic and timid". Vibha Maru of India Today felt that the movie was "no 3 Idiots", giving it 2.5 stars out of 5. Shalini Langer of Indian Express criticised the performance of Sushant Singh Rajput and called the film "a disappointing fare", giving it 1.5/5 stars. Anna MM Vetticad criticised the film, calling it "a hotch-potch with a 3 Idiots hangover", rating the film 1.75 stars out of 5. Arnab Banerjee of Deccan Chronicle gave the film 2.5/5, and while he criticized the film for its writing and direction, he felt that "some of the characters are played by decent actors".

=== Box office ===
Chhichhore grossed ₹6.92 crores (₹69.2 million) on the first day of its release. It showed growth on its second (first Saturday) and third day (first Sunday) grossing ₹34.77 crores (₹347.7 million) by the end of the opening weekend. By the end of the first week, the Sushant Singh Rajput-Shraddha Kapoor starrer had collected ₹66.63 crores (₹666.3 million). The lifetime gross of the movie from India is ₹172.64 crores (₹1726.40 million) and approximately 31 crores ($4.35 million/₹309.93 million) from overseas market, taking it worldwide gross to ₹203.63 crores (₹2036.3 million). The film is part of the prestigious "200 Crore Club".

The film was released in China on 7 January 2022, where it performed poorly, grossing only ₹22.52 crores ($3.01 million), becoming the lowest grossing Indian film in China. The performance at the China box office is being attributed to the fact that the ongoing pandemic has greatly reduced in theatre footfalls. This coupled with the fact that Chhichhore saw immense competition from new and previous releases entailed a tough uphill task for the business of the film at the China box office.

== Accolades ==
Award (Note: Awards, festivals and organizations are in Alphabetical order.)	Date of ceremony (Note: Date is linked to the article about the awards held that year, wherever possible.)	Category	Recipient(s)	Result	Ref.
Filmfare Awards	15 February 2020	Best Film	Nadiadwala Grandson Entertainment	Nominated	
Filmfare Awards	15 February 2020	Best Director	Nitesh Tiwari	Nominated	
Filmfare Awards	15 February 2020	Best Editing	Charu Shree Roy	Nominated	
Filmfare Awards	15 February 2020	Best Story	Nitesh Tiwari, Piyush Gupta, Nikhil Mehrotra	Nominated	
Filmfare Awards	15 February 2020	Best Dialogue	Nitesh Tiwari, Piyush Gupta, Nikhil Mehrotra	Nominated	
International Indian Film Academy Awards	27–29 November 2020	Best Story	Nitesh Tiwari, Piyush Gupta, Nikhil Mehrotra	Nominated	
Mirchi Music Awards	19 February 2020	Best Background Score	Sameer Uddin	Nominated	
National Film Awards	22 March 2021	Best Feature Film in Hindi	Producer : Nadiadwala Grandson Entertainment; Director : Nitesh Tiwari	Won	
Nickelodeon Kids' Choice Awards India	21 December 2019	Favorite Movie	Chhichhore – Nitesh Tiwari	Won	
Nickelodeon Kids' Choice Awards India	21 December 2019	Favorite Movie Actress	Shraddha Kapoor	Won	
Screen Awards	8 December 2019	Best Actor (Critics)	Sushant Singh Rajput	Nominated	
Screen Awards	8 December 2019	Best Supporting Actor	Varun Sharma	Nominated	
Screen Awards	8 December 2019	Best Film (Critics)	Nitesh Tiwari	Nominated	
Zee Cine Awards	13 March 2020	Best Director	Nitesh Tiwari	Nominated	
Zee Cine Awards	13 March 2020	Best Story	Nitesh Tiwari, Piyush Gupta, Nikhil Mehrotra	Nominated	
Zee Cine Awards	13 March 2020	Best Screenplay	Nitesh Tiwari, Piyush Gupta, Nikhil Mehrotra	Nominated	
Zee Cine Awards	13 March 2020	Best Actor – Female	Shraddha Kapoor	Nominated	
