= Manshaa =

- Directed by: Anurag Vaishnav
- Starring: see below
- Opening theme: "Manshaa" by Pamela Jain
- Country of origin: India
- Original language: Hindi
- No. of episodes: 143

Production
- Producer: Sailesh Dave
- Running time: approx. 24 minutes

Original release
- Network: Zee TV
- Release: 12 October 2003 – 16 June 2004

Manshaa is an Indian television series that aired on Zee TV from 12 October 2003 to 16 June 2004 from Sunday to Wednesday.

== Plot ==
Mansha is a fragile girl whose life circumstances made her extremely shy. she lives with her brother and sister-in-law, who love her very much. they have just moved to a new city where Mansha begins college and befriends Ria. Ria's brother - Vinay, falls in love with Mansha and offers her marriage in their second meeting. this frightens Manasha and so she agrees to marry Rohit, the matchmaking that her sister-in-law found for her. Heartbroken by Mansha's decision, Vinay agrees to marry Tanya, his sister-in-law's friend. Little by little Mansha realizes that she is in love with Vinay but is unable to cause her family to be ashamed, by breaking the wedding. So, she decides to marry Rohit despite her feeling. Rohit hears her confession at the temple and decides not to attend the engagement ceremony and sends an apology note. This causes great embarrassment to Mansha's family and hatred in Mansha's heart for Rohit. Vinay who is happy to find out that Mansha's engagement has been canceled also cancels his engagement to Tania. He offers Mansha to get married and she agrees. They are married and in love. Tanya is jealous of Mansha, and she tries to make her fall down the stairs. But instead, her sister-in-law Quita who is pregnant fall' and is subsequently aborted. She will also never be able to have children again. Tanya encourages Quita to believe that Mansha made her abort her child and blame her in front of the whole family. The family is angry at Mansha for trying to appease them without success. Finally, Vinay decides to leave the house with Mansha. The truth is revealed, and the family comes to bring home Vinay and Mansha, who in the meantime has become pregnant herself. Tanya hires a mercenary killer to kill Mansha. A Vinay was accidentally murdered on the spot. Tanya confesses her sins and goes to jail, but even from there, she is still trying to make sure the killer kills Mansha. Following the death of a Vinay, Mansha goes into shock, she does not eat, and this may affect her fetus. At the suggestion of the doctors, the family decides to lift the atmosphere at home through Ria's marriage. Ria's groom is actually Rohit who does not know that he is engaged to Mansha 's little brother-in-law and girlfriend. He is shocked to see Mansha's situation and together with Ria, they plan to continue showing the engagements, which makes Mansha remember Rohit's injury and wake up in time, to stop the engagements. She removes Rohit from the house and the whole family joins her after they hear what he has done. Mansha gives birth to a daughter and her name is Diya (Light of the Flame) Ria is the only one who knows the truth about Rohit - she encourages everyone including Mansha to marry Rohit with Mansha. They get married and slowly Mansha begins to fall in love with Rohit. In the engagements of Rohit and Mansha, old neighbors of the Vinay family arrive with their son Ponit who has returned from another country. The family decides to groom Ponit and Ria who become friends. Meanwhile, there are conflicting reports about Ponit ruining a girl's life and not being a decent guy and on the other hand about being a good guy. The family decides to marry Ria to someone else, but Ponit maneuvers her to escape the wedding on the pretext that he will commit suicide otherwise. They lie down and he leaves her to force her family to agree to their wedding. Ponit convinces Rohit to agree to their wedding and believes him that he is truly in love with Beria. Rohit convinces Mansha and the family. On the wedding night, Ponit's real face is revealed as a violent and not the most insane person. (Although there were focal signs of this). At one point Mansha receives a phone call in which Ria asks for help for fear of Ponit. Ponit hangs up and Mansha with Rohit runs to look for her and does not find her. Ponit plays her who does not know where Ria is. And the plot gets so complicated that Ponit kidnaps Mansha's daughter and writes her an anonymous letter to get her to come to meet him. So, he tells her that he actually did everything he could to get her. Ponit forces her to part with furniture and comes to him. When she arrives, he tries to force himself on her. Rohit gets there and rescues her during the brawl between them Ponit tries to kill Rohit but dies himself. Out of this fear Rohit Mansha and Dia fly to another place and on the way the plane crashes. Mansha loses memory, their child adopts some family and Rohit comes to another family whose house Seema is pregnant and to save the family from embarrassment Rohit marries Seema. He then discovers that Mansha is alive and has lost her memory and she is living with Dr. Karen. After several bumps, they unite and are freed from all obstacles in their path. They plan to reunite with the Vinay's family who adopted Mansha as a daughter before her marriage to Rohit. The day before they return, they receive a call from Maria, who is being held captive, in which she informs them that Ponit is not actually dead. He was rescued by one of his gang members and kept Ria in captivity all this time. Just before he is about to kill Ria, Rohit arrives at the scene and stops Ponit and the police arrest him. The series ends with Mansha and Rohit living with Dia in the same house with Quita and Vinay's brother and their parents. The family convinces Ria to move on and agree to remarry. Mansha tells Rohit that she is pregnant with him.

== Cast ==
- Gulrez Khan as Manshaa Vinay Khanna
- Ram Kapoor as Vinay Kishore Khanna - Dead
- Navni Parihar as Asha Kishore Khanna: Vijay, Vinay and Rhea's mother
  - Rupa Divetia replaced Parihar as Asha
- Manav Gohil as Rohit
- Tarana Singh as Seema
- Karishma Tanna as Rhea Khanna
  - Tina Parekh replaced Tanna as Rhea
  - Kanchan Mirchandani replaced Parekh
- Paritosh Sand as Kishore Khanna - Vijay, Vinay and Rhea's father
- Indraneel Bhattacharya as Vijay Khanna
- Dharam Taneja as Rohit's elder brother
- Rajlaxmi Solanki as Rohit's sister-in-law
- Rushad Rana as Rhea's fiancée
- Prashant Bhatt as Karan
- Dalljiet Kaur
