= Kulvaddhu =

- Genre: Drama
- Directed by: Ashish Patil
- Starring: See below
- Opening theme: Pamela Jain
- Composer: Abhijeet Hegdepatil
- Country of origin: India
- Original language: Hindi
- No. of seasons: 1
- No. of episodes: 52

Production
- Producer: Anuj Saxena
- Production locations: Jodhpur, Rajasthan and Mumbai
- Editors: KGF Pradeep, Sujith Raj
- Running time: 22 minutes
- Production company: Maverick Productions

Original release
- Network: Sony TV
- Release: 25 December 2006 – 15 March 2007

Kulvaddhu (transl. Daughter-In-Law), is an Indian television drama serial produced by Anuj Saxena's production house, Maverick Productions. It first aired on Sony TV on 25 December 2006 and ended three months after its launch date.

== Cast ==
- Dalljiet Kaur as Niyati Chauhan / Niyati Shaurya Singh Rathore
- Imran Mashkoor Khan / Sachin Sharma as Shaurya Singh Rathore
- Kitu Gidwani as Antara Vikram Singh Rathore
- Milind Gunaji as Vikram Singh Rathore
- Suhasini Mulay as Vasundhara Singh Rathore
- Seema Bhargava as Padma Chauhan
- Shaleen Bhanot as Agni
- Rajesh Kumar as Jaswant Singh Rathore
- Sonali Verma as Damayanti Jaswant Singh Rathore
- Sushmita Mukherjee as Rajlakshmi Singh Rathore
- Rituraj Singh as Amit Sahay
- Ayaz Khan as Rajveer Singh Rathore
- Surbhi Tiwari as Sanyukta Samar Singh Rathore
- Chetan Pandit as Samar Singh Rathore
- Manasi Varma as Janvi
- Nisha Sareen as Carol Rajveer Singh Rathore
- Shweta Gautam as Bindiya
- Chinky Jaiswal as Child Niyati Chauhan
- Paritosh Sand as Upendra
- Anup Upadhyay as Sri Mohan Sevak (S.M.S.)
- Raja Kapse as Vishal Singh
- Pankaj Kalra as Inspector
- Tarun Khanna as Advocate Dhanraj Singhania
- Manish Khanna as Advocate
- Arun Mathur as Judge
