= Mangal Lakshmi =

Indian television series

- Genre: Family; Melodrama
- Directed by: Faheim Ahmad
- Creative directors: Garima Dimri; Siddharth Vankar
- Starring: Deepika Singh; Naman Shaw; Sanika Amit; Shubham Dipta; Manan Joshi
- Country of origin: India
- Original language: Hindi
- No. of episodes: 765

Production
- Producers: Suzana Ghai; Hemant Ruprell; Ranjeet Thakur
- Cinematography: Ravi K Yadav
- Camera setup: Multi-camera
- Running time: 20 - 46 minutes
- Production company: Panorama Entertainment

Original release
- Network: Colors TV
- Release: 27 February 2024 – 26 June 2026

Related
- Bhagyalakshmi

Mangal Lakshmi is an Indian Hindi-language family drama television series that aired from 27 February 2024 to 26 June 2026 on Colors TV and streams digitally on Disney+ Hotstar. It is produced by Panorama Entertainment and is an official adaptation of the Kannada TV series, Bhagyalakshmi. The series starred Deepika Singh, Naman Shaw, Sanika Amit, Shubham Dipta and Manan Joshi. The show is also dubbed into Malayalam as Oru Kochu Swapnam on Asianet from 3 August to 1 October 2026.

== Plot ==
Mangal, a 35-year-old uneducated woman but a dedicated homemaker, lives with her husband, their two children, and her in-laws. Her husband, Adit, is a highly educated, 40-year-old, handsome yet irascible man who works as a senior manager in a company. He detests Mangal and often belittles her for being orthodox, uneducated, and for her simple dress sense. Although Mangal is unhappy with the way Adit treats her, she does not protest and still tries to impress him. Unlike Adit, his parents and their son, Akshat, appreciate Mangal for her efforts and contributions. Adit's level-headed father, Sudesh, and his austere mother, Kusum, defend Mangal whenever Adit berates her. Mangal has taken Lakshmi under her wing, cared for her, and mentored her like a daughter after Lakshmi's parents died. She rejects Nitin, a billionaire, as a potential suitor for Lakshmi because of his two failed marriages. Adit snaps at Mangal over the incident with Nitin and expresses how difficult it has been to live with her for the past 15 years. He cruelly remarks that Lakshmi might ruin the life of the man she marries, just as Mangal ruined his—since Lakshmi is much like Mangal. Kusum reprimands him and assures him that she and Mangal will find a respectful suitor for Lakshmi.

Lakshmi, her cousin, a 22-year-old orphan, lives with Mangal's parents and works as a tailor to support the family. Lakshmi is described as kind, hardworking, and cheerful. She is a gifted singer and songwriter but has never had the chance to showcase her talent. Lakshmi is socially smart, knows the English language, and is good with technology, unlike Mangal, who neither understands English nor is proficient with technology, which often leads Adit to insult her. Lakshmi is mistreated by Mangal's cunning and greedy mother, Shanti, and her spoiled sister, Lipika, but she is loved by Mangal and her father, Bhushan. Lakshmi discontinued her studies after the 10th grade to assist Bhushan in running the shop, supporting her family in their pursuit of a better life. Kusum's stern younger sister, Gayatri belongs to a wealthy family that includes her husband Umesh, their children Kartik and Nidhi, and her sister-in-law Sanjana. Kartik is a handsome, cheerful, and wealthy singer, known not only for his success but also for his good nature, kindness and respectful demeanor unlike Adit. Much like Mangal and Lakshmi, Kusum and Gayatri share a close, sisterly bond. Kartik respects and admires Mangal, just as Kusum and Akshat do. Gayatri's husband, Umesh, and their daughter, Nidhi, have gone to America for Nidhi's studies. Gayatri feels insecure and possessive of her son because of a curse given to her by her mother-in-law, who said that one day Kartik would be separated from her and she would die alone, yearning for him. Sanjana hates Gayatri for deliberately separating her mother and Umesh, which led Sanjana's mother to curse Gayatri. Sanjana constantly schemes against Gayatri, taunting her as a means of avenging her mother. Kartik has been in a relationship with Jiya, a dancer, for the past two years, but he has never disclosed it to anyone. However, Gayatri is aware of their relationship, unbeknownst to Kartik. Kusum and Gayatri harbor a deep disdain for Jiya due to her manipulative and undesirable nature, believing her to be unfit for Kartik.

== Cast ==
=== Main ===
- Deepika Singh as Mangal Saxena: Bhushan and Shanti's elder daughter; Lipika's sister; Adit's wife; Kapil's ex fiance; Neil and Akshat's mother; Ishana and Shubhi's adoptive mother (2024–2026)
- Naman Shaw as Adit Saxena: Sudesh and Kusum's son; Mangal's husband; Jiya's ex husband; Neil and Akshat's father; Ishana and Shubhi's adoptive father (2024–2026)
- Sanika Amit as
  - Lakshmi Kapoor: Shankar and Uma's daughter; Kartik's widow; Karan's wife; Sanvi's mother (2024–2026)
  - Antara Dalal: Lakshmi's lookalike; Raghuveer's wife; Vedaa's mother (2025) (Dead)
- Shubham Dipta as Kartik Nigam: Umesh and Gayatri's son; Nidhi's brother; Lakshmi's first husband; Sanvi's father (2024–2026) (Dead)
- Sarwar Ahuja as Raghuveer Dalal: Antara's husband; Vedaa's father (2024–2025)
- Manan Joshi as Karan Kapoor: Lakshmi's second husband; Sanvi's step-father (2025–2026)
- Avinash Sachdev as Jairaj Raizada: Yashvardhan and Mrs. Raizada's son; Adil's brother (2026)

=== Recurring ===
- Neeraj Khetarpal as Bhushan Srivastava: Shanti's husband; Mangal and Lipika's father; Neil and Akshat's grandfather; Ishana and Shubhi's adoptive grandfather (2024–2025)
- Sangeeta Panwar as Shanti Srivastava: Bhushan's wife; Mangal and Lipika's mother; Neil and Akshat's grandmother; Ishana and Shubhi's adoptive grandmother; (2024–2026)
- Sania Mistry as Lipika Srivastava: Bhushan and Shanti's younger daughter; Mangal's sister (2024–2025)
- Babul Bhavsar as Sudesh Saxena: Kusum's husband; Adit's father; Neil and Akshat's grandfather; Ishana and Shubhi's adoptive grandfather (2024–2026)
- Urvashi Upadhyay as Kusum Saxena: Sudesh's wife; Adit's mother; Neil and Akshat's grandmother; Ishana and Shubhi's adoptive grandmother (2024–2026)
- Mohammed Saud Mansuri as Neil Saxena: Adit and Mangal's elder son; Akshat, Ishana, and Shubhi's brother (2025–2026)
- Pratyaksh Panwar as Akshat Saxena: Adit and Mangal's younger son; Neil's brother; Ishana and Shubhi's adoptive brother (2026)
  - Ruhan Kapoor as Child Akshat Saxena (2024–2026)
- Saumya Shetye as Shubhi Saxena: Adit and Mangal's adopted daughter; Neil, Akshat, and Ishana's adopted sister (2026)
- Vanshika Bachwani as Ishana Kumar: Sunita's daughter; Adit and Mangal's adopted daughter; Neil, Akshat, and Shubhi's adopted sister; Aarav's wife (2026)
  - Arshiya Sharma as Child Ishana Saxena (2024–2026)
- Altamash Faraz as Aarav Kumar: Ishana's husband (2026)
- Bhuvan Chopra as Umesh Nigam: Sanjana's brother; Gayatri's husband; Kartik and Nidhi's father; Sanvi's grandfather (2024–2025)
- Gayatri Soham as Gayatri Nigam: Umesh's wife; Kartik and Nidhi's mother; Sanvi's grandmother (2024–2026)
  - Jyoti Gauba replaced Soham as Gayatri Nigam (2025–2026)
- Riya Doshi as Nidhi Nigam: Umesh and Gayatri's daughter; Kartik's sister (2024–2025)
- Sangeeta Adhikari as Sanjana Nigam: Umesh's sister (2024–2025)
- Sanjay Bhatia as Yashvardhan Raizada: Mrs. Raizada's husband; Jairaj and Adil's father (2026)
- Asmita Sharma as Mrs. Raizada: Yashvardhan's wife; Jairaj and Adil's mother (2026)
- Ahmad Harhash as Adil Raizada: Yashvardhan and Mrs. Raizada's son; Jairaj's brother (2026)
- Raman Khatri as Mr. Tandon: Shalini's husband; Saumya's father (2024)
- Preeti Khatri as Shalini Tandon: Mr. Tandon's wife; Saumya's mother (2024)
- Jia Mustafa as Saumya Tandon: Mr. Tandon and Shalini's daughter; Adit's ex-wife (2024–2026)
- Unknown as Vrinda: Sameer's mother. (2024)
- Verr Bhati as Sameer: Vrinda's son. (2024)
- Vipul Tyagi as Sonu: Lakshmi's shop helper. (2024)
- Khushwant Walia as Manan: Adit's friend. (2024)
- Kimmy Kaur as Prema Kapoor: Jiya's mother. (2024)
  - Ekta Sharma replaced Kaur as Prema Kapoor. (2024–2025)
- Siyona Joisar as Vedaa Dalal: Raghuveer and Antara's daughter. (2025)
- Prerna Daware as Nysa: Startup Sultan Constestant. (2025)
- Akshay Sharma as Host Kunal (Startup Sultan 2025)
- Neelu Vaghela as Bhabhiji (2025)
- Shritama Mukherjee as Vishkanya (2025)
- Farah Khan as Judge (2025)
- Dilip Mukhija as Judge (2025)
- Sahil Arora as Jigar (2025)
- Rudrakshi Gupta as Pratima Bhatnagar: Kapil's mother. (2025)
- Kapil Nirmal as Kapil Bhatnagar: Pratima's son; Mangal's ex fiance (2025)
- Neena Cheema as Kapil's Bua Dadi (2025)
- Ekta Tiwari as Sunita: Ishana's mother. (2025)
- Mrinal Navell as Barkha Kapoor: Vyom's sister. (2025)
- Saurabh Gumber as Vyom Kapoor: Barkha's brother. (2025–2026)
- Shrey Mittal as Krish Khanna: Barkha and Vyom's half-brother (2025–2026)
- V S Prince Ratann as Chandu: Adit's Mystery Man (2026)
- Sambhabana Mohanty

== Production ==
=== Development ===
The series is an official adaptation of the Kannada-language TV series Bhagyalakshmi. It follows the life and struggle of an elder sister (Mangal) who wants a perfect husband for her younger sister (Lakshmi). In October 2024, the show aired its much awaited Adit and Saumya affair expose drama on the occasion of Karwa Chauth.

In December 2024, Mangal Lakshmi began airing one hour episodes, with the first 30 minutes focusing on Mangal's story and the remaining 30 minutes on Lakshmi's story, which was separately titled as Mangal Lakshmi – Lakshmi Ka Safar. Lakshmi Ka Safar ended on 6 March 2026; consequently, Lakshmi's character was phased out as well.

=== Casting ===
Deepika Singh was cast as Mangal, and Naman Shaw as Adit, marking their return to television after a four-year absence. Sanika Amit was cast as Lakshmi and Shubham Dipta was cast as a singer, Kartik. Later, Jia Mustafa was cast as Saumya and Rutuja Sawant as Jiya. Sawant was later replaced by Priyanka Purohit. Kapil Nirmal was cast as Kapil Bhatnagar.

=== Reception ===
Lakshmi's story Mangal Lakshmi – Lakshmi Ka Safar received positive response from the audience. In Week 14, 15 and 16 2025, the show entered Top 3 defeating StarPlus' Yeh Rishta Kya Kehlata Hai at the same slot.

== Adaptations ==
Language	Title	Original release	Network(s)	Last aired	Notes
Kannada	Bhagyalakshmi ಭಾಗ್ಯಲಕ್ಷ್ಮಿ	10 October 2022	Colors Kannada	7 June 2026	Original
Marathi	Kavyanjali – Sakhi Savali काव्यांजली – सखी सावली	29 May 2023	Colors Marathi	26 May 2024	Remake
Hindi	Mangal Lakshmi मंगल लक्ष्मी	27 February 2024	Colors TV	26 June 2026	Remake
