= Naman Shaw =

Indian television actor and producer

- Occupation: Actor Producer
- Years active: 2004–present
- Known for: Tashan-e-Ishq
- Spouse: Nehaa Mishra (m. 2017)

Naman Shaw is an Indian television actor and producer. He was discovered as an actor at India's Best Cinestars Ki Khoj, made it in top 15. Since then he has played supporting roles in television serials such as Kasautii Zindagii Kay (2001 TV series) and Kasautii Zindagii Kay.

== Career ==
Shaw began his acting career through participating in Zee TV's talent hunt show, India's Best Cinestars Ki Khoj in 2004 where he made the Top 15. Later Naman has worked in some television serials, cast in supporting roles such as Pushkar Shukla in Kasamh Se, Nakul Virani in Kyunki Saas Bhi Kabhi Bahu Thi, Nihaal Garewal in Kasautii Zindagii Kay, and Adit Saxena in Mangal Lakshmi. Naman Shaw has also played small roles in other serials such as a brief role in Kasturi as Kasturi's fiancé, Girish. Later he had a brief role in Kahe Naa Kahe as Vidhyud on 9X channel. He also appeared in Nach Baliye 4. He was seen in Colors TV's popular show Kairee — Rishta Khatta Meetha as Anuj replacing Jay Bhanushali., He has worked in web series Flip (Anthology- HUNT ) directed by Bejoy Nambiar. He has produced numerous shows/web series.

== Television ==
Year	Show	Role
2004	India's Best Cinestars Ki Khoj	Contestant
2005	Kkavyanjali	Sahil Verma
2006–2008	Kasamh Se	Pushkar Shukla
2006–2008	Kyunki Saas Bhi Kabhi Bahu Thi	Nakul Virani
2007–2008	Kasautii Zindagii Kay	Nihal Garewal
2008	Kasturi	Girish
2008	Kahe Naa Kahe	Vidhyud
2008	Saas v/s Bahu	Guest
2008	Kaun Jeetega Bollywood Ka Ticket	Contestant
2008	Nach Baliye 4	Contestant
2008–2010	Sssshhh... Phir Koi Hai	Arjun
2008–2010	Sssshhh... Phir Koi Hai	Ajinkya
2009	Jeet Jayenge Hum	Prabhakar
2010	Rakt Sambandh	Niraj
2011–2012	Beend Banoongaa Ghodi Chadhunga	Jai Poddar
2012	Kairi — Rishta Khatta Meetha	Anuj Shrivastav/Abhay Shrivastav
2013	Saath Nibhaana Saathiya	Shekhar
2014	Khushiyon Kii Gullak Aashi	Vishesh Doobey
2014–2015	Box Cricket League 1	Contestant
2015	Tujhse He Raabta	Saif
2015	Piya Rangrezz	Aditya Pratap Singh
2016	Box Cricket League 2	Contestant
2016	Comedy Nights Bachao	Guest
2016	Tashan-e-Ishq	Kunj Manohar Sarna
2016	Jamai Raja	Guest (as Kunj)
2016	Kumkum Bhagya	Guest (as Kunj)
2017	Naagin 2	Ahem
2018	Box Cricket League 3	Contestant
2018	Laal Ishq	Dhruv
2019	Khatra Khatra Khatra	Contestant
2024–2026	Mangal Lakshmi	Adit Saxena

== Web ==
Year	Name	Role	Notes	Ref
2019	Flip	Parth		
