= London International School of Performing Arts =

Coordinates: 51.52715°N 0.0064°W

Based in both Berlin and London, the London International School of Performing Arts (LISPA) was founded in 2003 by Thomas Prattki - the former pedagogical director of the Jacques Lecoq International School of Theatre (Ecole Jacques Lecoq) in Paris - along with Amy Russell, who was Chair of the Naropa University MFA in Lecoq-Based Actor Created Physical Theater. LISPA was a private educational institution offering full-time postgraduate Masters-level training programs in Devising Theatre based on the teachings of Jacques Lecoq, as well as short workshops and a regular Summer School before finally closing as a school in 2018.

== Locations ==
LISPA began life at the Playground Studios, Latimer Road, London. Due to increased student numbers, an additional studio was used in Hackney, North London and the courses ran for a number of years as double groups. Eventually in January 2008 the whole school moved to a studio and office in 3 Mills studios, East London.

From January 2016 onwards, all full-time courses and most short courses took place in Berlin, Germany.

LISPA ran its last season in 2017-18 before its official closure.

== Courses ==
=== Workshops ===
In addition to the full-time courses LISPA had a yearly Summer School and a regular workshop in association with the London International Mime Festival in January of each year, as well as various bespoke workshops throughout the year.
