= Ananya =

- Language: Hindi; Sanskrit

Origin
- Region of origin: India

Ananya is the common English spelling of two Indian given names: the masculine अनन्य ananya and the feminine अनन्या ananyā. The meaning of name Ananya is "unique".

== Notable people named Ananya ==
- Ananya (actress) (born 1987), Indian actress
- Ananya Agarwal, Indian television child actress
- Ananya Bhat (born 1993), Indian playback singer
- Ananya Birla (born 1994), Indian singer, songwriter and entrepreneur
- Ananya Chatterjea, Indian dancer and scholar
- Ananya Chatterjee (born 1977), Indian actress
- Ananya Jahanara Kabir, Indian literary scholar working in Britain
- Ananya Kasaravalli, Indian film actress and director
- Ananya Khare (born 1968), Indian actress
- Ananya Nagalla, Indian actress
- Ananya Nanda, Indian playback singer
- Ananya Panday (born 1998), Indian actress
- Ananya Roy (born 1970), American-Indian urban theorist
- Ananya Vajpeyi, Indian academic and writer

== See also ==
- Ananya Express, Indian Railways superfast-class train
- Anannya Magazine, a women's Bengali-language magazine
- Anannya Nattya Goshthi, a theatre group
- Lepiota ananya, a gilled mushroom found in Kerala, India
- Shree Airlines, Nepalese airline formerly known as Air Ananya
