= Kunwara Baap =

Kunwara Baap (lit. 'Bachelor Father') may refer to these Indian Hindi-language films:

- Kunwara Baap (1942 film)
- Kunwara Baap (1974 film)

== See also ==
- Bachelor Father (disambiguation)
