= Snigdha =

- Gender: Female
- Language: Sanskrit, Hindi, Marathi, Bengali, Punjabi, Kasmiri, Gujarati, Kannada, Malayalam, Oriya, Tamil, Telugu, Persian, Arabic, Urdu, Turkish,
- Name day: Friday

Origin
- Origin: Indian
- Meaning: Elegant, Graceful, Kind, Affectionate, Calm, Charming
- Region of origin: India, Middle East

Other names
- Alternative spelling: Sneegdha, Snygdha
- Variant form: Snidha
- Nickname: Snig
- Usage: In Affection
- Related names: Snigda, Snighda, Snigdho

Snigdha (Bengali: স্নিগ্ধা; Hindi: स्निग्धा) is mainly an Indian name originating in the Indian Subcontinent used when admiring or complimenting something. It may be used as an adjective (meaning "elegant", "graceful", "kind", "affectionate", "calm" or "charming"). It means soft and tender.

== People with the name ==
People with the name Snigdha include:

- Snigdha (actress), an Indian singer and actress
- Snigdha Akolkar, an Indian actress and model
- Snigdha Pandey, an Indian actress
- Snigdha Nandipati, 2012 Scripps National Spelling Bee champion
