= Snigdha Pandey =

Indian actress

- Born: Kolkata, India
- Occupation: Actress
- Years active: 2008–present
- Known for: Dotara (film); Straight (2009 film); Hello Pratibha; Navya; Do Dil Bandhe Ek Dori Se; Chhajje Chhajje Ka Pyaar; Angrezi Mein Kehte Hain; Kashmakash Zindagi Ki; Stree Teri Kahani; Boond Aur Samudra (DD classic); Jahan Pe Basera Ho (Star Plus); Mera Dil Deewana (DD Prime Time); Muhabbatnoma (2010 Uzbek Film)
- Height: 5 ft 6 in (1.68 m)

Snigdha Pandey is an Indian actress.

== Early life ==
Snigdha Pandey is a Bollywood film and television actress originally from Kolkata. Snigdha Pandey was a junior level (under 16) player at the Indian Tennis Academy, Sports Authority of India in Kolkata. However, she gave up Tennis to focus on her education.

== Career ==
Snigdha holds a bachelor's degree in economics from the University of Delhi and a Master's in Economics from Jamia Millia Islamia She started pursuing acting while in college and was a part of theatre group 'Act One' run by N.K Sharma in Delhi. She got her first break with a Pivotal Cameo in Hindi Film Straight (2009 film) playing Protagonist's Runaway Bride who leaves him high and dry on their wedding day, starting a string of mishaps that plague him throughout the film. Then followed many successful stints with Television starting with Angrezi Mein Kehte Hain, an Indian edutainment show on NDTV Imagine that premiered on March 24, 2008. Her more noticeable roles have been as the Conniving and Manipulative Negative Lead Rama Bajpai in Navya, Positive, feisty and tenacious Bela in Do Dil Bandhe Ek Dori Se and most recently as the devious and suave Villain Sunidhi in Hello Pratibha.

Throughout her career she has worked with many eminent directors and producers like N. Chandra in the screen adaptation of Boond Aur Samudra the classic novel by Amrit Lal Nagar, Ravi Baswani in Siddhartha Basu's Edutainment show Angrezi Mein Kehte Hain and Stree Teri Kahani produced by Saira Bano

She has been recognized for effectively portraying diverse sets of characters and has command over many Indian Dialects as well as the privilege of having acted in multiple languages. She played the lead role in an Uzbeki film Muhabbatnoma, released in Uzbekistan, She was most recently seen as the serious and intellectual Protagonist, Snata Mitra in 2019 Bengali movie Dotara (film). Dealing with the serious issues of Naxalism and insurgency in North Bengal, Snigdha successfully pulled off a character requiring great sensitivity and restraint, playing her role in a settled, understated way, never overpowering the Subject of the film, which was the main focus. The film ran successfully all over West Bengal and North Bengal for 5 weeks to packed houses and Snigdha's work was widely appreciated.

== Filmography ==
- Dotara (film) as Protagonist Snata Mitra
- Hello Pratibha as Sunidhi Agarwal
- Angrezi Mein Kehte Hain as Deepti Pandya
- Navya..Naye Dhadkan Naye Sawaal as Rama Bajpai
- Do Dil Bandhe Ek Dori Se as Bela Sehariya
- Chhajje Chhajje Ka Pyaar as Pinky
- Straight (2009 film) as Payal
- Kashmakash Zindagi Ki as Sheetal
- Stree Teri Kahani as Sunaina
- Boond Aur Samudra as Nando
- Muhabbatnoma (Uzbek Kino 2010) as Female Lead Mumtaz Beghum
- Mera Dil Deewana as Tanya
- Jahan Pe Basera Ho as Preety, Aditya's girlfriend
