= Anuj Nayyar =

Indian army captain; Maha vir chakra recipient

Captain Anuj Nayyar MVC
- Born: 28 August 1975; Delhi, India
- Died: 7 July 1999 (aged 23); 2nd Pimple Complex, Kargil, Jammu & Kashmir, India
- Military career
- Allegiance: Republic of India
- Branch: Indian Army
- Service years: 1997–1999
- Rank: Captain
- Service number: IC-57111W
- Unit: 17 JAT
- Conflicts: Kargil War †
- Awards: Maha Vir Chakra

Captain Anuj Nayyar, MVC (28 August 1975 – 7 July 1999) was an Indian Army officer of 17 Jat Regiment who was posthumously awarded the Maha Vir Chakra, India's second highest gallantry award, for exemplary valour in combat during operations in the Kargil War in 1999.

== Early years and career ==
Anuj Nayyar was born and grew up in Delhi, India. His father, Satish Kumar Nayyar, worked as a visiting professor in Delhi School of Economics while his mother, Meena Nayyar, worked for the South Campus library of Delhi University. He was a bright student who consistently performed well in academics and sports.

Nayyar received his high-school education from Army Public School, Dhaula Kuan (1993 batch). He graduated from the National Defence Academy and later was commissioned into the 17th battalion, Jat Regiment (17 Jat) in June 1997 from the Indian Military Academy.

== Kargil War ==
=== Background ===
In 1999, the Indian Army detected a massive infiltration by Pakistani military and paramilitary forces in the Kargil region of Jammu Kashmir. The army quickly mobilized its forces to drive out the Pakistani infiltrators from Indian territory. 17 Jat was one of the battalions deployed in the region. Nayyar's first major operation involved securing Pimple II, a peak within the Pimple Complex, on the western slopes of Point 4875, a strategic peak in the Mushkoh Valley.

Due to its strategic location, securing Point 4875 was a top priority for the Indian Army. The peak, which stood at 15,990 feet above sea level, had extremely steep slopes and capturing the peak without aerial support was considered near impossible. In a last-ditch attempt, C Coy, 17 Jat, of which Nayyar was the second-in-command, decided to secure the peak without waiting for any aerial support on 6 July.

=== Operation ===
During the initial phase of C Coy's assault on Pimple II, Nayyar's company commander was injured, and command devolved upon him. As the unit advanced under heavy enemy artillery and mortar fire, the lead section reported the location of 3-4 enemy bunkers. Nayyar moved forward and destroyed the first bunker with a rocket launcher and grenades. Still under heavy fire, he then proceeded with the lead section, which consisted of 7 personnel, and destroyed two more bunkers. During the battle, Nayyar killed 9 Pakistani soldiers and destroyed three medium machine gun bunkers. The company then began its assault on the last remaining bunker, but while clearing it, an enemy RPG directly hit Nayyar and killed him instantly. Pimple II was captured on 8 July, but Anuj Nayyar had to pay his supreme sacrifice on the mission.

During the entire battle for Pimple Complex, 46 regular members of the Pakistan Army, an unknown number of Pakistani paramilitary troopers, militants were killed and 11 Indian Army troops, including Capt. Nayyar, were killed. The securing of Pimple Complex paved the way for the recapture of Tiger Hill which finally forced Pakistan to retreat back across the Line of Control.

== Recognition and legacy ==
Nayyar was posthumously awarded the Maha Vir Chakra for his bravery and leadership in combat.

Nayyar's father, S.K. Nayyar, was allotted a gas station in Delhi by the Government of India in recognition of the services of his son. Tejbir Singh, a fellow soldier of the Jat Regiment, named his son Anuj in honour of Nayyar.

School in Janakpuri area of Delhi, was named as "Shaheed Captain Anuj Nayyar Sarvodaya Bal Vidyalaya".

A road in Janakpuri area of Delhi, was named as "Captain Anuj Nayyar Marg."

On the 76th Republic Day (26 Jan 2025), India paid tribute to Kargil hero as Southern Railway dedicated a locomotive in his name "Captain Anuj Nayyar".

=== Maha Vir Chakra citation ===
Gazette Notification: 17 Pres/2000,15.8.99
Operation: Vijay – Kargil
Date of Award: 1999

Citation: On 06 July 1999, Charlie Company was tasked to capture an objective, which was a part of the Pimple Complex on the Western Slopes of Point 4875, in the Mushkoh Valley. At the beginning of the attack, the Company Commander got injured and the command of the company devolved on Captain Anuj Nayyar. Captain Nayyar continued to command his leading platoon into the attack under heavy enemy artillery and mortar fire. As the platoon advanced, the leading section reported the location of 3 to 4 enemy positions. Captain Nayyar moved forward towards the first enemy position and fired a rocket launcher and lobbed grenades into it.

Thereafter, the section, along with Captain Nayyar, physically assaulted and cleared the position. The enemy, which was well entrenched, brought a heavy volume of automatic fire. Captain Anuj Nayyar, unmindful of his personal safety, motivated his men and cleared two more enemy positions. While clearing the fourth position an enemy rocket-propelled grenade hit the officer and martyred him on the spot. This action led by Captain Anuj Nayyar resulted in the killing of nine enemy soldiers and the destruction of three medium machine gun positions of the enemy. The success of this operation after a brief setback was largely due to the outstanding personal bravery and exemplary junior leadership of this daring officer. Captain Anuj Nayyar displayed indomitable resolve, grit, and determination and motivated his command by personal example acting beyond the call of duty and made the supreme sacrifice in true traditions of the Indian Army.

=== In Media ===
Following Nayyar's death, his heroics during the war were widely covered by Delhi's print media with editorials like Times of India and Hindustan Times running full-page descriptions of his Kargil mission. The plight and ill-treatment of his parents by Indian government officials after his death became the subject of several short telefilms and was widely reported in the Indian news media. Several books and Indian films were made to depict Anuj's life and glorify his contribution to the Indian Army.

- In 2003 the Hindi film LOC Kargil, directed by J.P. Dutta, which depicted the endeavours of the Indian Army during the Kargil War, was released in which Saif Ali Khan played the role of Anuj Nayyar.
- In 2003, the Hindi film Dhoop directed by national award winner Ashwini Chaudhary, was released which depicted the life of Anuj's parents after his death. Om Puri played the role of Prof. Kapoor that was based on Prof S.K. Nayyar, Anuj's father. Revathi played the role of Mrs. Kapoor, Capt Rohit Kapoor's mother.
