= Stree Teri Kahani =

- Genre: Soap opera
- Opening theme: Haan Stree Teri Kahani by Shreya Ghoshal
- Country of origin: India
- Original language: Hindi
- No. of seasons: 2
- No. of episodes: 742

Original release
- Network: DD National
- Release: 2006 – 2009

Stree Teri Kahani (transl. The Story of a Woman) was a show on DD National with a total of 743 episodes. It starred Ravi Dubey, Namrata Thapa, Meher Vij, Nikhhil Raj Khera, Snigdha Pandey and Sonica Handa. It was produced by Saira Banu, directed by Suneel Prasad and written by Shaheen. It was broadcast from 12:30-1:00 pm, Monday through Friday. The show launched on 21 August 2006, ran continuously for four years and ended in 2009. Due to high viewership (TRPS) and positive response, DD National made a repeated telecast at 2010 which ran until 14 November 2013. The series ran from 2006 to 2009.

== Plot ==
The story of Stree Teri Kahaani revolves around four girls who are very close to each other. These four girls have gone to the same college and, come from the same batch. Now all four of them have finished their college and, strive towards fulfilling their dreams. The protagonist of the story is Radha. The name of the serial has been kept after the stories of these four women. The names of the four friends are Radha, Sanjana, Ritu and, Rubina. Radha is a mature girl who has her own likes and dislikes; she has a stubborn father too.

Sanjana is a chirpy, funny and relatable girl who lives her life to the fullest and has beautiful flaws. Ritu is a nice, mature, chirpy and understanding. She lives alone in Mumbai. Rubina whereas is a girl who lives out of Mumbai and wants to accomplish her dreams. She also inspires her friends to fulfill their dreams. The story is about these four girls and their precious friendship. The story of the serial includes Radha who is in love with a guy named Karan. Her father doesn’t support their relationship which is why she has to leave her home after which she marries Karan. But her father plans and plots something against them. He plans Karan’s murder and, succeeds in the same.

After this he has Radha marry his business friend's son Ajay, who is a good man, but Radha is unable to forget her first love. Ritu is in love with Karan, who lives outside Mumbai. Sanjana marries Vishal. Vishal marries Sanjana only for his good and he tortures her, beats her, put blame on her and, completely lock her. However, one day she manages to run where she meets another guy who helps her get her divorce and, cares for her. Radha moves on and things start to get better with Ajay where Karan returns and it is being shown that he has been saved. Karan starts to create problems in Ajay’s and Radha’s life and story has further twists.

Meanwhile Devyani who works in Ajay’s office and Anu who is a relative of Ajay create problems in their lives. The show was all about the moments of happiness, sadness, struggles and love in a woman’s life. Above all the show celebrates the beauty of girl’s friendship. It also showed how women’s lives change after marriage and the effects on their friendship.

== Cast ==
=== Main ===
- Vaani Sharma / Shweta Rastogi as Radha
- Sandeep Bhansali as Karan Kapoor
- Nikhhil Raj khera as Vishal (NRI)

=== Supporting ===
- Ravi Dubey / Arjun Dwivedi as Ravi (Parallel Lead when Ravi was doing it)
- Mujataba Ali Khan as Ajay
- Namrata Thapa as Tara
- Snigdha Pandey as Sunaina
- Bharati Sharma as Devyani
- Utkarsha Naik / Mugdha Shah as Ajay's mother
- Prithvi Zutshi as Ajay's father
- Melissa Pais as Lalita, Ajay's aunt
- Meher Vij as Ritu
- Sonica Handa as Sanjana
- Nazia Hasan Sayyad as Rubina
- Buddhaditya Mohanty as Raj: Sanjana's lover
- Raman Khatri as Sanjana's father
- Neha Bam as Sanjana's mother
