= Gul Panag =

Indian actress

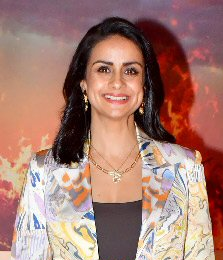
- Panag in 2025
- Born: Gulkirat Kaur Panag; 3 January 1979 (age 47); Chandigarh, India
- Other name: Gul Panag-Attari
- Occupations: Actress; Voice actress; Model; Politician
- Years active: 2003–present
- Height: 5 ft 6 in (1.68 m)
- Political party: Aam Aadmi Party (2014–2021)
- Spouse: Rishi Attari (m. 2011)
- Children: 1
- Parent: H. S. Panag (father)
- Website: www.gulpanag.net

Gulkirat Kaur "Gul" Panag (born 3 January 1979) is an Indian actress, voice actress, model and politician. She was crowned Femina Miss India Universe 1999 and represented India at Miss Universe 1999. She began her career in Hindi films with the 2003 film Dhoop directed by Nagesh Kukunoor and since then, she has starred in several films like Jurm along with the TV series Kashmeer.

Her films include Dor, Dhoop, Manorama Six Feet Under, Hello, Straight, and Ab Tak Chhappan 2.

She played a commoner, fighting hard to save her husband from going to the gallows, in the 2006 Nagesh Kukunoor film, Dor. In 2008, she acted in the films Hello and Summer 2007. In 2009, she appeared in the movie Straight. She featured in Rann in a role attempting to stop her boyfriend from doing the right thing. Panag appeared on the front page of Maxim with whom she did a photo shoot in September 2008. She debuted in Punjabi movies with Sarsa. She was the Aam Aadmi Party candidate from Chandigarh for 2014 Lok Sabha Elections.

== Early life ==
Panag started her education in Sangrur, in Punjab. Her father, Lt. Gen. Panag was in the army and the family moved to different places across India and abroad. As a result of this, she studied in 14 different schools including Kendriya Vidyalayas (Chandigarh, Mhow, Leh and Wellington, Tamil Nadu), The Lawrence School, Lovedale and the International School of Lusaka, Zambia. She did her Bachelors in Mathematics from Punjabi University, Patiala, and Masters in Political Science from Panjab University, Chandigarh. As a student, Panag was interested in sports and public speaking. She won numerous state and national level debate competitions, including two gold medals at the Annual National Inter University Debate competition.

== Career ==
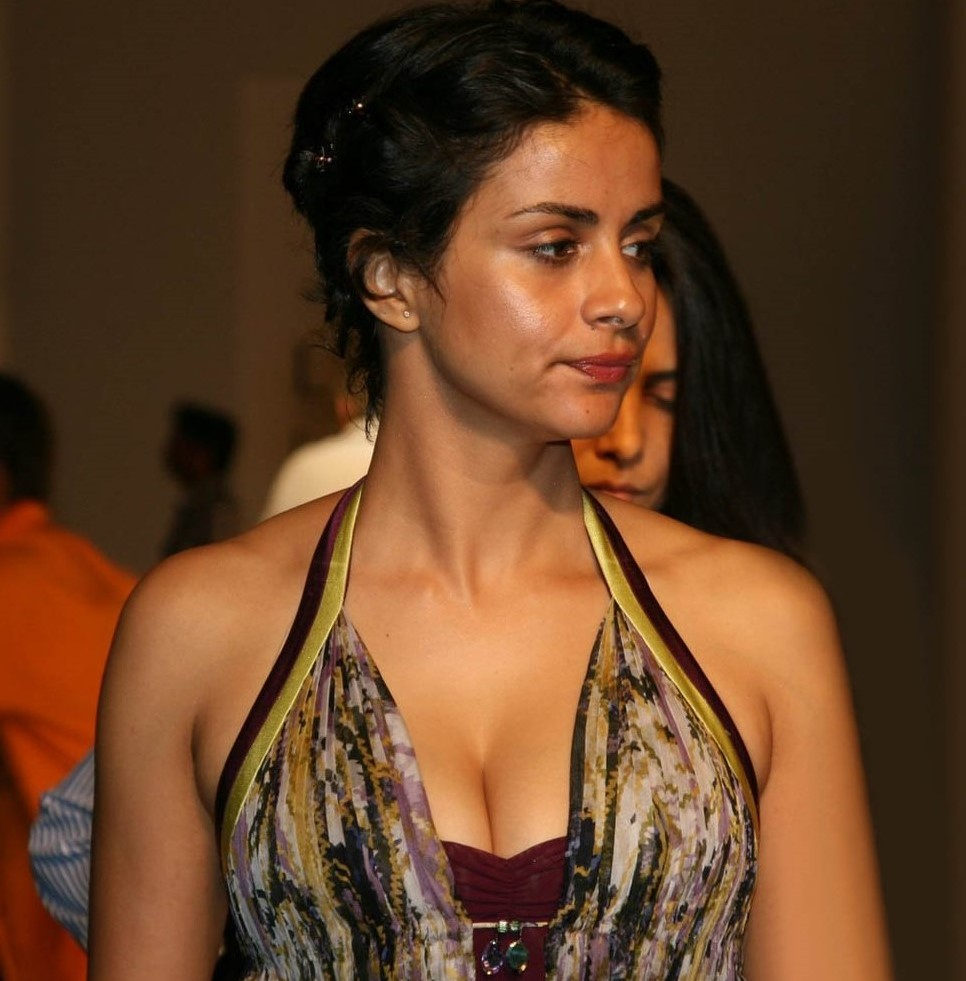
Gul Panag in Lakme Fashion Week, 2009

=== Modeling ===
Panag won the Miss India title in 1999, and was crowned Miss Beautiful Smile at the same pageant. She participated in the Miss Universe 1999 pageant.

=== Brand endorsement ===
She has appeared in numerous advertisements on television and print media and is the brand ambassador for Tata Sky, along with Aamir Khan.

Panag was the Twitter Face for the Wills Lifestyle India Fashion Week held in 2009, to cover the happenings/proceedings on the micro-blogging site.

=== Social activism ===
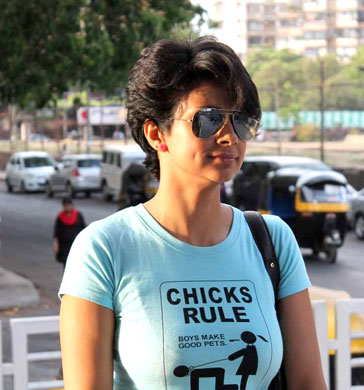
Panag at Juhu in 2012

Gul Panag runs the Colonel Shamsher Singh Foundation, an NGO that works towards a variety of causes including gender equality, education and disaster management. She served on the advisory board of the Wockhardt Foundation. She also participated in the India Against Corruption movement. She ran at the Delhi Half Marathon in November 2010, but endured eve teasing (sexual harassment) from male runners at the event. She later remarked that the attitude of men in Delhi needed to change and that the city was unsafe for women.

=== Political career ===
Panag joined the Aam Aadmi Party in March 2014. She was the Aam Aadmi Party candidate from Chandigarh for 2014 Indian general election. She came on third position with 1,08,679 votes, while Kirron Kher won the election with 1,91,362 votes. Later she distanced herself from the party's mainstream political activities and resigned from the party in June 2021.

=== Other interests ===
She is a half-marathon runner, a biker, and a certified pilot. She debuted on the racing track at the Mahindra Racing's all new M4Electro at the circuit de Calafat in Catalonia, Spain.

A health activist and fitness advocate Gul Panag, co-founded health and fitness startup MobieFit in 2017.

Gul Panag is also a director at Tittar Lodge Productions Private Limited, which provides digital, tailor-made TV content, film and documentary content.

== Personal life ==
Panag married her long-time boyfriend, an airline pilot, Rishi Attari on 13 March 2011 in a Gurdwara in Chandigarh in a traditional Punjabi Sikh ceremony. The couple has a son named Nihal born in 2018.

== Awards ==
- 2007 - Tied - Zee Cine Critics Award for Best Actress, tied with Ayesha Takia for Dor.
- 2020 - Nominated – Filmfare OTT Awards for Best Supporting Actress (Drama Series) - Paatal Lok

== Filmography ==
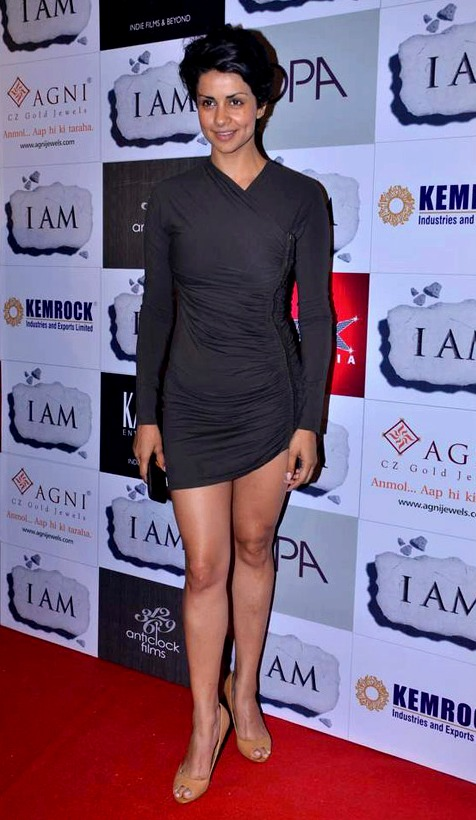
Gul at an event in 2012

=== Films ===
Year	Film	Role	Language	Notes
2003	Dhoop	Peehu A. Verma	Hindi	
2005	Jurm	Sonia	Hindi	
2006	Dor	Zeenat Fatima / Zeenat A. Khan	Hindi	
2007	Manorama Six Feet Under	Nimmi	Hindi	
2008	Summer 2007	Vishakha	Hindi	
2008	Hello	Priyanka	Hindi	
2009	Anubhav	Meera Hemant Valecha / Meera A. Malhotra	Hindi	
2009	Straight	Renu	Hindi	
2010	Rann	Nandita Sharma	Hindi	
2010	Hello Darling	Mansi Joshi	Hindi	
2011	Turning 30	Naina Singh	Hindi	
2011	Phir Zindagi		Hindi	
2012	Fatso!	Nandini	Hindi	
2013	Sikander	Beant Kaur	Punjabi	
2015	Ab Tak Chhappan 2	Shalu	Hindi	
2016	Ambarsariya	Boss	Punjabi	
2019	Student of the Year 2	Coach Kuljeet	Hindi	
2019	Bypass Road	Romila	Hindi	
2021	420 IPC	Pooja	Hindi	
2022	The Ghost	Anupama Naidu Nair	Telugu	
2023	Zwigato	Herself	Hindi	

=== Television ===
Year	Title	Role	Notes
2002	Kismey Kitnaa Hai Dam	Presenter	
2003	Kashmeer	Zoya	
2013	Khoobsurat	Presenter	
2017	Musafir Hoon Yaaron	Presenter	
2018	Vijay Jyoti	Jyoti	
2019	The Family Man	Saloni	
2019	Rangbaaz Phirse	Anupriya	
2020	Paatal Lok	Renu Chaudhary	
2020	Pawan & Pooja	Pooja Mehra	
2022	Good Bad Girl	Zaina Mistry	

Awards and achievements
Preceded by Lymaraina D'Souza	Femina Miss India; 1999	Succeeded by Lara Dutta (Miss Universe)
