= Dhoop =

- Directed by: Ashwini Chaudhary
- Written by: Kumud Chaudhary; Sanjay Chauhan
- Produced by: Sanjay Reddy, Parth Arora, Saket Bahl, Karan Grover
- Starring: Om Puri; Revathi; Gul Panag; Sanjay Suri; Yashpal Sharma
- Edited by: Arvind Tyagi
- Music by: Lalit Sen
- Distributed by: Dream Boat Entertainment Pvt Ltd and Fundamental Films
- Release date: 7 November 2003
- Running time: 126 minutes
- Country: India
- Language: Hindi

Dhoop (transl. Sunshine; Hindi pronunciation: [ˈd̪ʱuːp]) is a 2003 Indian drama film directed by Ashwini Chaudhary, based on the Battle of Tiger Hill. Actress Gul Panag made her Bollywood debut with this film. The film stars Om Puri and Revathi and is loosely based on Captain Anuj Nayyar, MVC and his family.

== Plot ==
The movie is based on the events surrounding the death of Honorable Capt Anuj Nayyar, MVC of 17 Jat Regiment of the Indian Army, who was martyred in operations against Pakistani Army soldiers, in the southwest sector of Tiger Hill on 5 July 1999 as part of the Kargil conflict. The story of the Kapoor family in the film depicts the real events that happened in the lives of the Nayyar family.

Capt Rohit Kapoor is a young officer in the 17 Jat Regiment of the Indian Army. His father Prof. Suresh Kumar Kapoor, is a professor of economics at the Delhi School of Economics. His mother Sarita Kapoor, is a librarian at the Delhi University Central Library. He is engaged to be married to Pihu Verma.

The storyline of the movie takes place between 1999 and 2002, beginning with the death of Captain Kapoor while successfully defeating insurgents and personnel of Pakisthani army and paramilitary to capture Pt 4875 on the western side of Tiger Hill, Kargil.

The news is a huge shock to his family, and the first half of the film portrays their attempts to cope with their grief. They receive messages of condolence from various high government officials as they attempt to come to terms with their loss.

As compensation for the loss of their son, the government allots them a franchise for running a petrol pump. Mrs. Savita Kapoor is aghast at such an offer, and the family is not inclined to avail of this compensation. However, after a visit from Major Kaul, Capt. Kapoor's immediate senior in the Regiment, Prof. Kapoor and Pihu feel it might be a worthy site to commemorate the memory of Rohit and decide to take up the offer. Savita gets convinced by her husband, Prof. Kapoor.

However, as they attempt to make this dream a reality, they encounter massive corruption and red tape at various levels of Indian bureaucracy. They are threatened and humiliated by various government officials and hooligans. However, the family perseveres in the face of immense odds and continues to struggle. The latter half of the film narrates the story of their mission.

== Cast ==
- Om Puri as Prof Suresh Kumar Kapoor, Rohit's father
- Revathi as Savita Kapoor, Rohit's mother
- Sanjay Suri as Captain Rohit Kapoor
- Gul Panag as Peehu Verma, fiancée of Rohit
- Yashpal Sharma as Inspector Ram Singh Mallik
- Virendra Saxena as Viru Bhai
- Murli Sharma as Col.Rathore
- Ganesh Yadav as Murli Pandey
- Gopi Desai as Rukma
- Gautam Saugat as Balbir
- Ashutosh Jha as Raman
- Niharika as Nishi
- Ehsaan Khan as Akhil Verma, Peehu's father
- Paritosh Sand as Major Kaul
- Rohitash Gaud as L/Nk Nihar Singh
- Preeti Dayal as Naina Verma, Peehu's mother
- Neeraj Sood as Dobriyal, clerk
- Prasad Pandit as Mr Ghosh
- Rajesh Mishra as Pandu
- Jogi as Kalia Jr Engineer
- Shirish Handa as Manav
- Kuldeep Sharma as Manav's father
- Raj Kanojia as Auto driver
- Shagun Luthra as News reporter
- Sam Bharoucha as OSD
- Shakti Singh as Sameer Taman
- Richa Nayyar as Sharbati

== Reception ==
The film was not successful at box office. However, it got critical acclaim.

== Inspiration ==
The film is an account of the inspiring struggle of Prof Nayyar and his family against entrenched systemic corruption. His dream was finally realized with the setting up of the petrol pump named 'Kargil Heights', in the Vasundhara Enclave area of New Delhi

Prof Nayyar's struggles continued for several years, and the film serves to highlight the appalling treatment meted out to the families of courageous Indian soldiers who gave their lives in protecting the nation.

== Music ==
| Song-title | Singer(s) |
|---|---|
| "Benaam Sa Yeh Dil" | Jagjit Singh |
| "Chehra Mere Yaar" | Wadali Brothers |
| "Dhoop Ek Safar" | Hariharan |
| "Har Ek Ghar Mein" | Jagjit Singh |
| "Subah Ke Dhoop Si" | Hariharan, Shreya Ghoshal |
| "Teri Aankhon Se Hi" | Shreya Ghoshal |
| "Teri Aankhon Se Hi" | Jagjit Singh |
| "Ye Dhoop Ek Safar" (Female) | Shreya Ghoshal |

== Awards and nominations ==
=== Zee Cine Awards 2003 ===
==== Nominated ====
- Best Actress in a Supporting Role - Revathi
- Best Story - Kumud Chaudhary

=== Screen Weekly Awards 2004 ===
==== Nominated ====
- Best Dialogue - Kumud Chaudhary, Sanjay Chauhan
- Best Story - Kumud Chaudhary
- Best Supporting Actress - Revathi
