= Jurm (2005 film) =

- Directed by: Vikram Bhatt
- Produced by: Aashish Singh; Anurag Singh; K.P. Singh
- Starring: Bobby Deol; Lara Dutta; Milind Soman; Vivek Shauq; Gul Panag; Shakti Kapoor
- Cinematography: Pravin Bhatt
- Edited by: Kuldeep K. Mehan
- Music by: Anand Raaj Anand; Anu Malik
- Distributed by: Yash Raj Films
- Release date: 18 February 2005
- Running time: 162 minutes
- Country: India
- Language: Hindi

Jurm (English: Crime) is a 2005 Indian Hindi-language thriller film written and directed by Vikram Bhatt. It stars Bobby Deol, Lara Dutta, Milind Soman and Gul Panag. The film follows a rich industrialist who gets arrested for his wife's murder and pleads not guilty.

The marketing of the film included a promotional mobile video game based on the film by Paradox Studios. The film was released on 18 February 2005. With critics praising the thrills, performances and music while criticizing the predictability in the screenplay, the film failed at the box office.

== Summary ==
Avinash Malhotra, a rich businessman, is arrested for murdering his wife Sanjana. All the evidence points towards his guilt, but Avinash himself is unsure whether he killed her. A guilt-ridden and distraught Avinash asks the help of his friend and lawyer Rohit to escape from sure punishment. But Avinash doesn't know that he is going to get into an even bigger mess than he is trying to get out of.

== Plot ==
Avinash and Sanjana's married life goes downhill when he realizes that she has been lying to him, even about petty things. Even though there is no concrete evidence, he is convinced that Sanjana is cheating on him. His attitude towards her changes, which becomes a cause of concern for his friends. They try in all futility to talk sense into him, but his anger towards Sanjana increases. Things come to an ugly turn when Avinash abuses and embarrasses Sanjana at a party they are attending.

Sanjana heads back to their home and Avinash follows. The next day, Avinash learns that he brutally killed Sanjana in front of her uncle. A case stands in the court, and he is given a life sentence. Unconvinced of his guilt, he asks his lawyer and friend Rohit for help. Avinash promises Rohit the power of attorney of his property in lieu of helping him escape. Rohit helps him escape, but backstabs him by fleeing with the money and leaving him for dead.

Avinash is saved by his friend Sonia and nurtured back to safety and health. Determined to exact his revenge on Rohit, Avinash zeroes the location of the latter in Malaysia. However, he is stunned to see Sanjana there, hale and alive, living with Rohit. He also narrows down and confronts Sanjana's uncle, who confirms that Sanjana was having an affair with Rohit and that he helped the duo to remove Avinash from their lives.

An enraged Avinash kills Sanjana's uncle and sets out to seek revenge. First, he confronts her, creating fear and panic in her heart. She tells about him to Rohit, who is skeptical and thinks that Sanjana is losing it. After Sanjana realizes this, she has a fight with him. Later, Avinash creates a rift between them, paying them back in their own coin. Unaware of all this drama, an inspector is sent to find Avinash, who is still assumed to be missing.

The inspector also turns up in Malaysia, following the trail. Here, Rohit accidentally runs into Avinash and realizes that Sanjana was right. Sanjana is on the verge of breaking up, and Rohit becomes afraid that she might spill the beans. Rohit and Sanjana attend a party, where she almost lets the secret out. They have a confrontation and turn to go home, just like it happened with Avinash. They go into the parking lot, where Avinash is patiently waiting for them.

Avinash knocks Sanjana unconscious and kills Rohit. The next day, Sanjana regains consciousness and finds that she has been arrested for killing Rohit. Based on the circumstances, Sanjana is found guilty and given life imprisonment. The Inspector, who has deduced all the story by now, meets her in her cell and expresses his satisfaction over her plight. Avinash too meets her one last time, after which he meets Sonia, indicating that he will start his life afresh without her and leaving her to repent for her sins in jail.

== Cast ==
- Bobby Deol as Avinash Malhotra
- Lara Dutta as Sanjana Malhotra (secondary antagonist).
- Shakti Kapoor as Chamanlal, Sanjana's Uncle (third antagonist).
- Gul Panag as Sonia / Chandni Saxena
- Milind Soman as Rohit Sharma the main antagonist
- Ashish Vidyarthi as ACP Vishnu Ram Patnaik
- Vivek Shauq as Avinash Malhotra's sidekick and friend
- Milind Gunaji as Sanjay Pathak, lawyer (Cameo)

== Soundtrack ==
Jurm

Soundtrack album by Anand Raaj Anand Anu Malik
- Released: December 2004
- Genre: Feature film soundtrack
- Label: YRF Music

Anu Malik composed 2 songs, authored by Rahat Indori but later Anand Raaj Anand was brought on board to complete the score. Lyrics were penned by Dev Kohli and Rahat Indori.

#	Title	Singer(s)	Lyrics	Music
1	"O Sanam O Sanam"	Udit Narayan, Pamela Jain	Dev Kohli	Anand Raaj Anand
2	"Meri Chahato Ka Samudar"	Abhijeet, Alka Yagnik	Rahat Indori	Anu Malik
3	"Aksar Ye Hota Hai Pyar Mein"	Kunal Ganjawala	Dev Kohli	Anand Raaj Anand
4	"Nazrein Teri Nazrein"	Adnan Sami	Dev Kohli	Anand Raaj Anand
5	"Rabba Rabba"	K.K., Gayatri Iyer	Dev Kohli	Anand Raaj Anand
6	"Main Yahan Tu Kahan"	Abhijeet Bhattacharya	Dev Kohli	Anand Raaj Anand
7	"Dil Dil" (not in the film)	K.K., Shreya Ghoshal	Rahat Indori	Anu Malik
