= Amritlal Nagar =

Hindi-language writer (1916–1990)

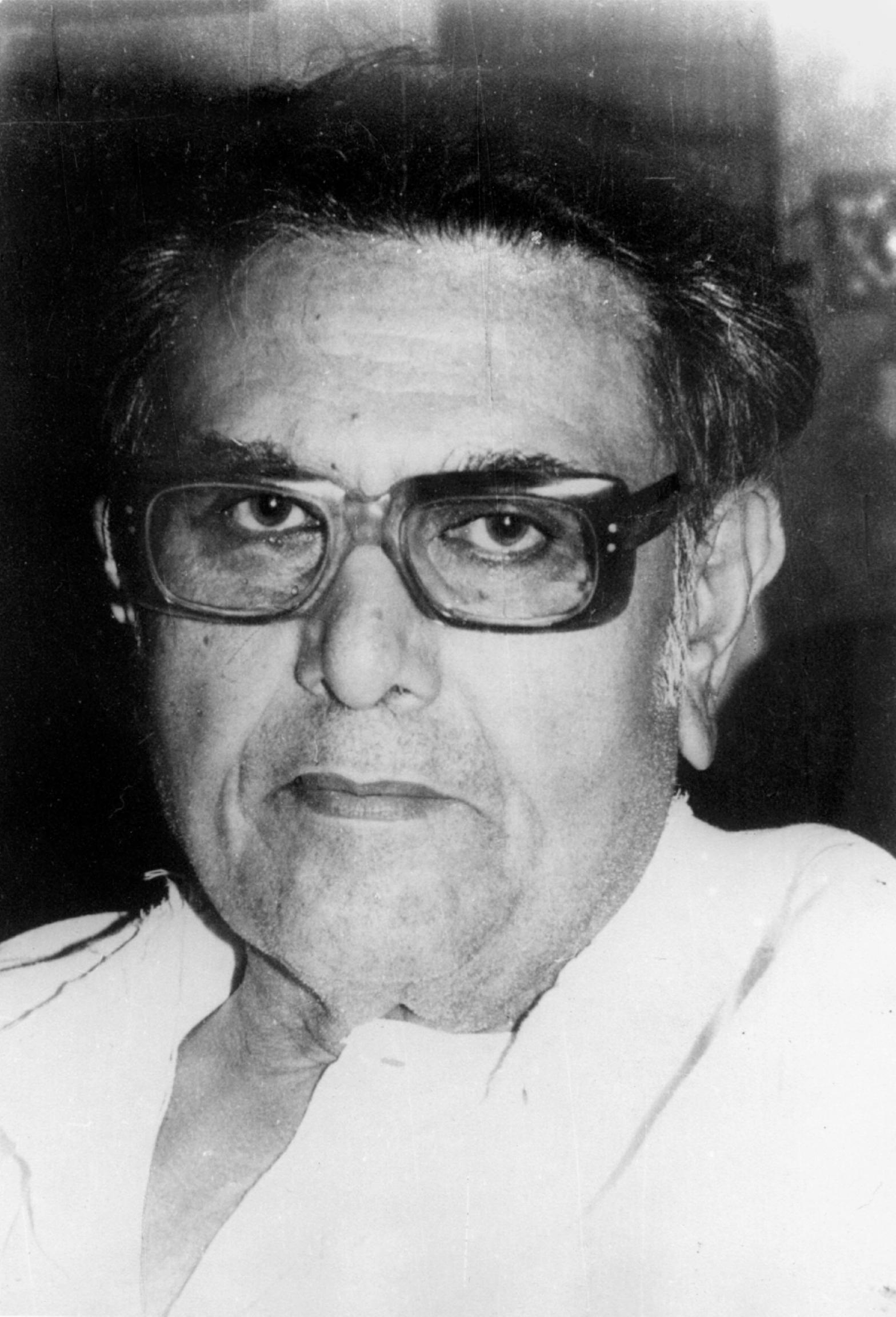
- Born: 17 August 1916; Agra, United Provinces of Agra and Oudh, British India
- Died: 23 February 1990 (aged 73); Lucknow, Uttar Pradesh, India
- Occupation: Writer
- Spouse: Pratibha
- Children: 4
- Writing career
- Notable work: Boond Aur Samudra (1956)

Amritlal Nagar (17 August 1916 – 23 February 1990) was one of the prominent Hindi writers of the twentieth century.

He started off as an author and journalist, but moved on to be an active writer in the Indian film industry for 7 years. He worked as a drama producer in All India Radio between December 1953 and May 1956. At this point he realised that a regular job would always be a hindrance to his literary life, so he devoted himself to freelance writing.

Often cited as the true literary heir of Premchand, Amritlal Nagar created his own independent and unique identity as a littérateur and is counted as one of the most important and multi-faceted creative writers of Indian literature. In the words of famous critic, Dr. Ram Bilas Sharma,"Undoubtedly, Amritlal Nagar will be remembered as an important novelist. He has revealed the power of both standard [manak] Hindi, as well as the non-standard [ghair-manak] Hindi of the ordinary" (Sharma, Amritlal Nagar Rachnavali, Vol 1, p. 47).

Amritlal Nagar's real genius lay in the art of developing a range of characters in his stories and novels. Commenting on his distinctive ability to operationalise a story at many levels in complex and multi-dimensional ways, another prominent writer and critic of Hindi, Shreelal Shukla notes, "Rather than imposing his own personality on his character, Nagar ji dissolves himself in the character and in the process, he absorbs at the experiential level, all of those complexities that even the simplest characters nurture in the forms of anxieties and knotted puzzles. This work can only be done by a major creative writer" (Shukla, 10 Pratinidhi Kahaniyan: Amrilal Nagar, p. 10).

== Biography ==
Nagar was born on 17 August 1916 to Rajaram and Vidyawati Nagar in Chaurahe Wali Gali, Gokulpura, in a Gujarati Nagar Brahmin Family in Agra, India. He died on 23 February 1990 in Chowk, Lucknow, India.

He published his first poem in the fortnightly Anand in December 1928. The poem was inspired by a protest against the Simon Commission during which Amritlal suffered injury due to lathi charge.

He married Pratibha (original name Savitri Devi alias Bitto) on 31 January 1932. They had four children (Late Kumud Nagar, Late Sharad Nagar, Dr. Achala Nagar and Smt. Aarti Pandya).

=== Employment ===
Nagar worked as a dispatch clerk in the Lucknow office of All India United Insurance Company for 18 days. He provided voluntary services to the publication division of the Nawal Kishore Press and the editorial office of Madhuri in 1939. From December 1953 to May 1956 he worked as a drama producer in Akashvani (All India Radio), Lucknow, but resigned from this position so that he could focus all of his time and attention to his literary pursuits.He used to consult his friend and guide Nirmal Chandra Chaturvedi, MLC for portrayal of political and civic leaders and events in his writings.

=== Films ===
From 1940 to 1947, Nagar wrote screen plays and dialogues for the film industry in Bombay (now Mumbai), Kolhapur, and Chennai (Madras). He was one of the early pioneers specialising in cinematic dubbing that involved the art of translating films of one language into another. He dubbed Naseeruddin in Buhkara and Zoya from Russian and M.S. Subbulakshmi's Meera from Tamil into Hindi.

=== Honorary positions ===
- Member, Chairing Committee of the Indian People's Theatre Association (IPTA) or Bhartiya Jan Natya Sangh – 1947
- Member, National Committee of the Indo-Soviet Cultural Society (1961–1962)
- general secretary, Uttar Pradesh branch of the Indo-Soviet Cultural Society (1966–1968)
- Chair, Hindi Samiti Uttar Pradesh (1973–1976)
- Vice Chair and Acting Chair, Uttar Pradesh Sangeet Natak Akademi (1974–1979)
- Chair, Bhartendu Natya Academy (BNA) (1975)
- Member, Advisory Board, Akashvani (All India Radio) Lucknow (1974–1979)
- Member, Executive Board Uttar Pradesh Hindi Sansthan

=== Awards ===
- Boond Aur Samudra received the Batuk Prasad Puraskar (1958–1961) and the Sudhakar Padak of the Kashi Nagri Pracharni Sabha
- Suhaag ke Noopur received the Premchand Puraskar (1962–63) of Government of Uttar Pradesh
- Amrit aur Vish received the Sahitya Akademi Award (1967) and the Soviet Land Nehru Award (1970)
- Maanas ka Hans received the Akhil Bhartiya VeerSingh Dev Puraskar of the Government of Madhya Pradesh (1972), the Rajya Sahityik Puraskar of the Government of Uttar Pradesh (1973–1974), and the Shri RamKrishna Harjimal Daalmiya Puraskar (1978)
- Amritlal Nagar was awarded the Uttar Pradesh Sangeet Natak Akademi Puraskar for distinguished services to the Hindi Theatre (1970–1971)
- Amritlal Nagar was conferred the title of Sahitya Vaaridhi by the Uttar Pradesh Hindi Sahitya Sammelan, Prayag (1972)
- Amritlal Nagar was awarded Vishesh Samman on the occasion of the silver jubilee of Akashvani (All India Radio), Lucknow (1977)
- Amritlal Nagar received the Vishisht Puraskar of the Uttar Pradesh Hindi Sansthan (1979–1980)
- Padma Bhushan was conferred upon Amritlal Nagar by the Government of India (1981)
- Khanjan Nayan received the Nathmal Bhuvaalka Puraskar of Bhartiya Bhasha Parishad, Kolkata (Calcutta) (1984)
- Awadh Gaurav was conferred upon Amritlal Nagar by the Lucknow Mahotsav Committee (1986)
- Amritlal Nagar received the Dr. Rajendra Prasad Shikhar Samman by the Rajbhasha Parishad of the Government of Bihar (1988)
- Amritlal Nagar received the 1985 Bharat Bharati Puraskar, the highest award conferred by the Uttar Pradesh Hindi Sansthan, on 22 December 1989
- Amritlal Nagar was made a Fellow of the Sahitya Academi, New Delhi (1989)
- Amritlal Nagar was honoured by the Uttar Pradesh Urdu Hindi Award Committee (1989)
- Amritlal Nagar was conferred the title of Sahitya Vaachaspati by the Hindi Sahitya Sammelan, Prayag

== Bibliography ==
=== Story collections ===
- Vatika (1935)
- Avshesh (1937)
- Tularam Shastri (1941)
- Aadmi, Nahin! Nahin! (1947)
- Paanchvaan Dasta (1948)
- Ek Dil Hazaar Dastaan (1955)
- Atom Bomb (1956)
- Peepal Ki Pari (1963)
- Kaaldand Ki Chori (1963)
- Meri Priya Kahaniyan (1970)
- Bharat Putra Naurangilal (1972)
- Sikandar Haar Gaya (1984)
- Ek Dil Hazaar Afsaane (A collection of almost all of Nagar's stories, edited by Sharad Nagar, 1986)

=== Novels ===
- Mahakaal (1947), published as Bhookh (1970)
- Boond Aur Samudra (1956)
- Shatranj ke Mohre (1959)
- Suhag ke Noopur (1960)
- Amrit Aur Vish (1966)
- Saat Ghunghat Wala Mukhda (1968)
- Ekda Naimishshaaranye (1972)
- Maanas Ka Hans (1973)
- Naachayo Bahut Gopal (1978)
- Khanjan Nayan (1981)
- Bikhre Tinke (1982)
- Agni Garbha (1983)
- Karwat (1985)
- Peedhiyaan (1990)

=== Memoirs, reports, biographies, and essays ===
- Ghadar Ke Phool (1957): An important historical source based on the oral lore of the Revolt of 1857 from the Awadh region.
- Ye Kothevaliyan (1960): An original and unique social survey of the issues of sex workers.
- Jinke Sath Jiya (1973): Memoirs on Literary Figures
- Tukde Tudke Dastaan (1986): A collection of Amritlal Nagar's autobiographical writing, edited by Dr. Sharad Nagar
- Chaitanya Mahaprabhu (1978): Creative biography
- Sahitya aur Sanskriti (1986): A collection of literary and creative essays

=== Humour and satire ===
- Nawabi Masnad (1939)
- Seth Bankemal (completed in 1942, published in 1955)
- Kripya Dayen Chaliye (1973)
- Hum Fidaye Lakhnau (1973)
- Meri Shreshtha Vyang Rachnayen (1985)
- Chakkalas (1986)

=== Plays ===
- Yugavtar (1956): A stage play focused on the life of Bhartendu Harishchandra
- Baat Ki Baat (1974): A collection of radio plays
- Chandan Van (1976): A collection of radio plays
- Chakkardar Seedhiyan Aur Andhera (1977): A collection of radio plays
- Utaar Chadhaav (1977): A collection of radio plays
- Nukkad Par (1981): Stage plays
- Chadhat Na Doojo Rang (1982): Doordarshan (television) plays

=== Children's literature ===
- Natkhat Chaachi: Stories (1941)
- Nindiya Aaja: A Lullaby (1950)
- Bajrangi Naurangi A Children's Novel (1969)
- Bajrangi Pahalwaan : A Children's Novel (1969)
- Baal Mahabharat : In 6 Volumes (1971)
- Itihaas Jharokhe (1970)
- Bajrangi Smaglaron Ke Phande Mein : Children's Novel (1972)
- Hamare Yug Nirmata (1982)
- Chhah Yug Purush (1983)
- Mahabharat Katha (1988)
- Aql Badi Ya Bhains (1982)
- Satkhandi Haveli Ka Malik (1990)
- Phoolon Ki Ghati (1997)
- Baal Diwas Ki Rail : Natak (1997)
- Saat Bhai Champa (1998)
- Aao Bachchon Natak Likhen (1988)
- Iklauta Lal (2001)
- Sajha (2001)
- Somu Ka Janmdin (2001)
- Shanti Niketan Ke Sant Ka Bachpan (2001)
- Trilok Vijay (2001)

=== Translations ===
- Bisaati : Maupassant Ki Kahaniyan (1935)
- Prem Ki Pyas : Hindi adaptation of Gustave Flaubert's novel Madame Bovary (1937)
- Kala Purohit : Anton Chekhov Ki Kahaniyan (1939)
- Aankhon Dekha Ghadar : Translation of Vishnu Bhatt Godshe's Marathi book Majha Pravaas (1948)
- Do Fakkad : Translation of three Gujarati plays by K. M. Munshi (1955)
- Saaraswat : Hindi adaption of Mama Varerkar's Marathi play (1956)

=== Rachnavali and other collections ===
- Amrit Manthan (Interviews with Amritlal Nagar, 1991) : Editors: Dr. Sharad Nagar, Dr. Anand Prakash Tripathi
- Amritlal Rachnavali (in 12 volumes, 1992) : Foreword: Dr. Ram Vilas Sharma, Editor: Dr. Sharad Nagar
- Filmkshetrey Rangkshetrey (2003) : Nagar's articles pertaining to film, theatre, and radio plays
- Atrakushalam Tatrastu (2004) : Personal correspondence between Nagar and Ram Bilas Sharma
- Amritlal Naga Rachna-Sanchayan (2009) : Selected works published by the Sahitya Akademi. Editor: Dr. Sharad Nagar
- Sampoorna Baal Rachnayen: Amritlal Nagar (2011) : Editor : Dr. Sharad Nagar and Dr. Deeksha Nagar

=== Periodicals edited ===
- Suneeti (1934)
- Cinema Samchar, fortnightly (1935–1936)
- Allah De, weekly (20 Dec 1937 – 3 January 1938)
- Chakkalas, weekly (Feb 1938 – October 1938)
- Naya Sahitya (1945)
- Saneechar (1949)
- Prasad (1953–1954)

== Contributions to the fields of film, theatre, and radio ==
=== Screenplay and dialogue (only key films listed) ===
- Bahurani (1941) : Producer-Director: Kishore Sahu
- Sangam (1941) : Producer: Navyug Chitrapat Ltd, Kolhapur
- Kunwara Baap (1942) : Producer-Director: Kishore Sahu
- Uljhan (1942) : Producer: N. R. Acharya
- Raja (1943) : Producer-Director: Kishore Sahu
- Paraya Dhan : Producer: Nitin Bose
- Kisi Se Na Kahna : Producer: Leela Chitnis and Shree Gwalani
- Kalpana (1946) : Producer: Udaya Shankar
- Gunjan (1947) : Producer: Veerendra Desai
- Chor (1950) : Producer: Singh Art Production, Lucknow

=== Film dubbing ===
- Zoya : Hindi dubbing of Russian film
- Naseeruddin In Bukhara : Hindi dubbing of Russian film
- Meera : Hindi dubbing of Bharat Ratna, M.S.Subbulakshmi's Tamil film

=== Contributions to Indian theatre ===
- Directed his own play, Partyaag. Staged on 25 September 1954 in Lucknow
- Directed Skandgupt, 1949
- Directed Indian People's Theatre Association's production Eidgaah (theatrical adaption by Razia Sajjad Zaheer of Munshi Premchand's story), 1953.
- The Government of Uttar Pradesh filed a case against this production under the Drama Performance Act of 1876. In 1956 Justice Anandnarayan Mulla rejected the case on the grounds that it violated the right to expression granted by India's constitution and decided that the Drama Performance Act be declared null and void in independent India.
- Directed his own play Yugavtar, based on the life of Bhartendu Harishchandra, for Rangvani, Allahabad. Staged on 23 September 1955.
- Directed theatrical adaptation of Munshi Premchand's GODAN toassist with the construction of the building of Navyug Kanya Vidyalaya, Lucknow, 1956.
- Directed Chetsingh, written by Sarvadananda and produced by Natraj, Lucknow. Staged on 22–23 August 1956.
- Directed Rupiya Tumhe Kha Gaya written by Bhagwaticharan Varma andproduced by Bharti, Lucknow. Staged on 17 November 1958.
- Directed his own play Nukkad Par for Akashvani (All India Radio), Lucknow. Staged on 8 December 1963.
- Aao Bachchon Natak Likhen: A conversation about the art of creating plays. Published by Bal Natya Akademi, Lucknow. 1989 (Presented by Richa Nagar)

=== Key plays and comedies directed by Amritlal Nagar for radio broadcast ===
- Utaar-Chadhav (1951)
- Goongi (1953)
- Pakshi Teerth (1953)
- Shaitan Ki Duniya (1954)
- Bankemal Phir Aa Gaye (1954)
- Ashiq Ka Janaaza Hai Badi Dhoom Se Nikle (1954)
- Parityaag (1954)
- Dwaapar (1954)
- Chakkardar Seedhiyan Aur Andhera (1954)
- Natraj Ki Chhaya Mein (1955)
- Phir Na Kahna Dost (1955)
- Mahabodhi Ki Chhaya Mein (1955)
- Suhaag Ke Noopur (1955)
- Babu Shikayatlal (1955)
- Paanch Sau Rupiye Inaam (1956)
- Paataal Ke Khandahar (1959)
- Seth Baankemal (1959)
- Baat Ki Baat (1959)
- Rangbirangi Pichkari (1960)
- Begum Samroo (1961)
- Sharad Ki Maa (1963)
- Seema (1963)
- Pahla Sawaal (1964)
- Muflis Ka Radio (1965)

== Additional contributions ==
=== Contribution to archaeology ===
- Discovered archaeological remains pertaining to ancient Lucknow

=== Translations of Amritlal Nagar's work in other languages ===
- Boond Aur Samudra translated into Russian by India scholar V.Vekhukhlev and published in Moscow in 1962 as "Kaplya E Akiyan." The foreword for this translation of 653 pages was written by Professor Chelishev.
- Boond Aur Samudra translated by the National Book Trust into Urdu, Punjabi, Marathi, Tamil, Bangla, Gujarati, Telugu, Asamese, Oriya, and Malayalam.
- Suhaag Ke Noopur translated into Marathi, Kannada, and Oriya.
- Amrit Aur Vish translated into Russian by Moscow's Hindi scholar, S. Trubnikova as "Naiktar E Yaad." This translation of 408 pages was published in Moscow in 1973.
- Amrit Aur Vish translated by the Sahitya Akademi into Bangla, Kannada, Malayalam, Punjabi, Telugu, and Urdu.
- Manas Ka Hans translated into Gujarati, Marathi, and Oriya.
- Nachyo Bahut Gopal translated into Oriya.
- Bhookh translated into English as HUNGER.
- Khanjan Nayan translated into Marathi.
- Agni Garbha translated into Marathi.
- Saat Ghoonghat Wala Mukhda translated into English as The Face Behind Seven Veils.
- Children's novel Bajrangi Pahalwan translated into Nepali as Bajrangi Pahalwaan Ka Anotha Kaamharu.
- Gadar Ke Phool translated into English as Gathering The Ashes by Mrinal Pande. It was published by published by Harper Collins in 2014.
- Many stories written by Amritlal Nagar have been translated into Gujarati, Bangla, Marathi, Oriya, English, German, and Japanese.

== See also ==
- List of Indian writers
