= Kashmakash Zindagi Ki =

Indian drama television series

- Kashmakash Zindagi Ki
- Genre: Suspense drama
- Written by: Bobby Khan & Akashaditya Lama
- Screenplay by: Anurag Shrivastava
- Directed by: Rajesh Gupta & Aloknath Dixit
- Starring: Amrapali Gupta/Sudarshana Bhatnagar/Gauri Singh; Romanchak Arora; Firoza Khan; Sudha Chandran; Kishwer Merchant; Deepshikha Nagpal; Lata Haya; Anang Desai
- Opening theme: "Kashmakash Zindagi Ki" by Kunal Ganjawala
- Country of origin: India
- Original language: Hindi
- No. of seasons: 1
- No. of episodes: Total 575

Production
- Producers: Ashok Wadhwa & Anoop Wadhwa
- Editor: Nilesh Mulye
- Camera setup: Multi-camera
- Running time: 29-30 minutes

Original release
- Network: DD National
- Release: 27 November 2006 – 3 July 2009

Kashmakash Zindagi Ki is an Indian TV series produced by Reasonable Advertising Limited, based on the story of an adopted girl who is hated by everyone in her new family except her father. It premiered on 27 November 2006 on DD National. and ended on 3 July 2009, after a three-year run and was aired on DD National. The story portrays the sour relationships in a family. Kashmakash Zindagi Ki was Original aired in Monday to Friday at 1:30-2:00pm in 2006-2007 After Timing aired change between in 2007-2009 at 2:00-2:30pm. In the 2017-2020 Kashmakash Zindagi Ki Reruns in DD National aired on Monday to Friday at 12:00pm.

The series is one of longer-running Indian drama television series and Doordarshan prime time afternoon show and the Commercial Succes was Superhit of this show in DD National channel. Which completed its 300 episodes in June 2008 & 500 episodes on 20 March 2009.

== Cast ==
- Amrapali Gupta / Sudarshana Bhatnagar / Gauri Singh as Tanushree "Tanu" Malhotra: Vikram and Vandita's daughter; Sahil's first wife
- Romanchak Arora as Sahil: Aradhana's son; Poorva's elder brother; Tanushree, Payal and Ananya's husband
- Firoza Khan as Ananya: Sahil's wife
- Sudha Chandran as Rajyalakshmi (Antagonist)
- Kishwar Merchant as Mandira: Rajeev and Devyani's daughter; Aniruddh's wife; Mayank and Aditya 's mother
- Deepshikha Nagpal as Aradhana: Sahil and Poorva's mother; Rajdev and Devyani's stepdaughter
- Lata Haya as Devyani: Rajeev's wife; Mandira's mother; Aradhana's stepmother She is always plotting against Aradhana (Antagonist)
- Shakti Singh as Vikram Malhotra: Vandita's husband; Tanushree's father
- Shiju Kataria as Poorva: Aradhana's daughter; Sahil's younger sister; Aditya's wife
- Raj Singh Suryavanshi as Akul Malhotra: Aarushi's brother; Sheetal's husband
- Aakanksha Nimonkar as Aarushi Malhotra: Akul's sister
- Natasha Rana as Vandita Vikram Malhotra: Vikram's wife; Tanushree's first mother
- Zarina Wahab as Godavari; Pooja`s mother
- Uttara Baokar as Dadi: Rajdev`s mother
- Anang Desai as Rajdev: Aradhana's stepfather He likes Aradhana more than his biological daughter, Mandira.
- Amit Behl as Aniruddh: Mandira's husband; Mayank and Aditya's father; Pooja and Poorva's father–in–law; Kamya's former father–in–law
- Snigdha Pandey as Sheetal Akul Malhotra: Akul's wife; Tanushree and Aarushi's sister–in–law (Antagonist)
- Vijay Bhatia as Mayank: Aniruddh and Mandira's elder son; Pooja's husband
- Krishna Bharadwaj as Aditya: Aniruddh and Mandira's younger son; Mayank's younger brother; Poorva's husband
- Richa Soni as Kamya: Mayank ex–wife
- Akriti Singh as Payal: Sahil's wife; Rohit's wife
- Amit Kaushik as Rohit; Payal's Husband
- Parineeta Borthakur as Pratima
- as Pooja: Mayank's wife; Aniruddh and Mandira's daughter–in–law
- Shashi Sharma as Bharati Oberoi; Vicky's mother
- Shalini Arora as Suchitra
- Saira Banu as Revatti: Vikram's wife; Tanushree's second mother
