= Bachelor Father =

Bachelor Father may refer to:

- Bachelor Father (American TV series), a 1957–1962 sitcom starring John Forsythe
- Bachelor Father (British TV series), a 1970–1971 sitcom
- The Bachelor Father, a 1931 American pre-Code MGM drama film directed by Robert Z. Leonard
- Bachelor Father (film), a 1939 American Spanish-language comedy film directed by Richard Harlan

== See also ==
- Kunwara Baap (disambiguation)
