= Ananya Chatterjea =

Contemporary Indian dancer and scholar

- Born: Kolkata, India
- Occupations: Dancer, Choreographer, Scholar, Professor
- Years active: 1990s–present
- Employer: University of Minnesota
- Known for: Founder and Artistic Director of Ananya Dance Theatre
- Notable work: The choreography of Chandralekha: re(de)fining the postmodernist/feminist awareness in and through dance; In Search of a Secular in Contemporary Indian Dance
- Movement: Contemporary Indian Dance, Feminist Dance

Ananya Chatterjea is a contemporary Indian dancer and scholar. She is the founder, artistic director, and choreographer of Ananya Dance Theatre, a professional, contemporary Indian dance company composed of women artists of color. She is also a professor of dance at the University of Minnesota. Originally from Bengal, India, Chatterjea now lives in Minneapolis, Minnesota.

== Biography ==
Chatterjea grew up in Kolkata, India where she was trained in Indian classical and folk dance, particularly the Odissi style. Growing up she struggled to reconcile the beauty of dance she was learning and practicing with the injustices around her. This began her journey to explore contemporary Indian dance rooted in social justice. In the early 90s she moved to New York City to begin studying at Columbia University. Chatterjea now lives in Minneapolis, Minnesota where she is a professor of dance at the University of Minnesota and leads her dance company.

== Ananya Dance Theatre ==
After teaching dance for several years at the University of Minnesota, Chatterjea founded Ananya Dance Theatre in 2004. Ananya Dance Theatre is a contemporary Indian dance company composed of women artists of color. They combine artistic excellence with a philosophy of social justice to tell the stories and struggles of women around the world. Their themes include environmental injustice, colonization, capitalism, and more. “We’re artists. So we are not responsible for legislative shifts,” says Chatterjea. “That’s not what we do. Our work is in opening the ground, creating a space for questions, for provoking discussion, and for offering images that then resonate in people’s minds. So the way in which we understand our impact is when audiences come back year after year to see the work. When audiences come for a community conversation.”

Chatterjea employs community engagement within her performances, aiming to provoke community conversation. Her interactive dance shows center around her philosophy of "#occupydance" wherein audiences influence the movements of the dancers within a performance. Ananya Dance Theater holds workshops throughout the year in various countries and cities that her company tours in.

Ananya Dance Theatre premieres one new show annually in the Twin Cities and tours with performances, workshops, and dialogues throughout the year. Ananya Dance Theatre has presented in 12 other US cities and 12 other countries. They recently presented the keynote performance at the Crossing Boundaries Festival & Conference in Addis Ababa, Ethiopia.

== Publications ==
- The choreography of Chandralekha: re(de)fining the postmodernist/feminist awareness in and through dance. Chatterjea, Ananya, SDHS Conference, MN, 1996.
- How Can the Subaltern Speak?: Chatterjea, Ananya, Dancing Female: Lives and Issues of Women in Contemporary Dance, 1997.
- Chandralekha: Negotiating the female body in cultural/political signification. Chatterjea, Ananya, CORD Conference, 1996.
- Dance research in India: A brief report: Chatterjea, Ananya, Dance Research Journal, 1996.
- In Search of a Secular in Contemporary Indian Dance: A Continuing Journey: Chatterjea, Ananya, Dance Research Journal v36 n2 (20041201): 102-116, 2004.
- So Much to Remind Us We Are Dancing on Other People’s Blood: Moving toward Artistic Excellence, Moving from Silence to Speech, Moving in Water, with Ananya Dance Theatre: Omise'eke Natasha Tinsley, Ananya Chatterjea, Hui Niu Wilcox, and Shannon Gibney, Critical Transnational Feminist Praxis edited by Amanda Lock Swarr and Richa Nagar, 2010.
