= Straight (2009 film) =

2009 film by Parvati Balagopalan

- Directed by: Parvati Balagopalan
- Starring: Vinay Pathak; Gul Panag; Anuj Chaudhary
- Music by: Sagar Desai
- Production company: IDream Productions
- Distributed by: SPE Films India (Note: Released under the Columbia Pictures label.)
- Release date: 20 March 2009
- Running time: 110 minutes
- Country: India
- Languages: English; Hindi

Straight is a 2009 Indian film starring Vinay Pathak and Gul Panag in the lead roles. It is directed by Parvati Balagopalan, and produced by IDream Productions. The film is also shot in a restaurant in Leicester square, London and some parts are shot in Wembley. This movie marks the debut of a new actor named Anuj who plays a part in the love triangle. It also features Snigdha Pandey, Siddharth Makkar, Rasik Dave, Ketki Dave and Damandeep Singh in supporting roles.

== Plot ==
In the midst of central London, a Indian restaurant called 'Gaylord' is run by a Londoner of Indian origin called Pinu Patel (Vinay Pathak). A simple soul at heart, Peven at the age of 40, he is a virgin and has never experienced intimacy with any woman. He agrees to come to India to have an arranged marriage with Payal (Snigdha Pandey), but is crestfallen when his fiancée elopes on the wedding day, leaving a note behind ridiculing Pinu and his personality. This fuels Pinu's biggest fear of being laughed at by people—an ever-repeating phenomenon with him. Pinu is quite an introvert and has no real friends. The closest he has ever gotten to a friendship is with his foster brother Rajat (Siddharth Makkar), who is quite a contrast to his own personality. A casual air about him: he is the lead singer of a rock band. Rajat is very fond of Pinu, though it is often a source of annoyance to him as he finds Pinu really funny.

One day, a young Indian fellow called Kamlesh comes to his restaurant and asks for a job as a stand-up comedian. Quite thrown off, Pinu initially refuses but finally lets him join as a cook, who also does a stand-up act in the evenings. On the same day, he hires a new cashier, Renu (Gul Panag), a young art student from India who has a passion for caricatures. Life changes dramatically for Pinu as his restaurant Gaylord begins to transform. Renu works on the get-up of the place and makes cheerful caricatures for customers, while Kamlesh is a fabulous cook with a great talent for making people laugh in his acts. Soon, the restaurant is more happening, and the business is much better than before. But the greatest difference Kamlesh and Renu bring to his life is friendship. There is a visible difference in Pinu's personality now as he lets himself hang out a bit with them.

One day, Pinu is thrown into a daze as he walks away from the restaurant. He has discovered a new fear that he might be gay.

On a mission now, Pinu goes on a rampage, seeking available women for a sexual rendezvous. However, it leads to him suffering another string of tragicomic situations, ending up feeling humiliated. He gets engaged to Priyanka, and the marriage is fixed. Then after Rajat explains to him that love is the essence of life, Pinu realizes that he loves Renu. On the day of the wedding with Priyanka, Pinu, with the help of Rajat and Kamlesh, stops the marriage, and Pinu runs away to meet Renu and propose to her for marriage, which she gladly accepts. The film ends on a happy note, and finally Pinu gets happily married to his love.

== Cast ==
Actor	Role
Vinay Pathak	Pinu Patel
Gul Panag	Renu Goswami
Snigdha Pandey	Payal (Pinu's Fiancée)
Siddharth Makkar	Rajat Agnihotri
Anuj Choudhry	Kamlesh Sawant
Ketki Dave	Kanta kaki
Rasik Dave	Jaysukh kaka
Damandeep Singh Baggan	Pakwaan Singh
Ashwani Chopra	Sanat
Zaiur Rahman	Dalpat Maharaj
Vipul Bhatt	Payal's father
Shilpa Mehta	Payal's mother
Madhuri Mehta	Payal's sister
Bijal Patel	Priyanka Sharma
Rakesh Mehra	Priyanka's father
Sandeep Garcha	Priyanka's mother
Tushar Desai	Panditji
Aroosa Hassan	Mili (in a special appearance)
Achala Sachdev	Rashmi Ghosh (in a special appearance)
Edwin Hinds	Paul Lavers
Richard Clifton-Smith	Doctor
Lachlan Robison	Doctor

== Crew ==
- Director: Parvati Balagopalan
- Production house: Idream Productions
- Music director: Sagar Desai
- Lyricist: Subrata Sinha
