= Shweta Rastogi =

Indian television actress (born 1973)

- Born: 16 November 1973 (age 52); Meerut, Uttar Pradesh, India
- Occupation: Actress
- Years active: 1988–present

Shweta Rastogi is an Indian television actress from Meerut, Uttar Pradesh, India.

== Filmography ==
=== Films ===
Year	Film	Role
1988	Khoon Bhari Maang	Child Kavita Saxena
1989	Parinda	
1990	Kishen Kanhaiya	
1995	Veluchami	Chinamma

=== Television ===
Year	Serial	Role	Channel
1993–1994	Krishna	Radha	DD National
1993–1997	Alif Laila	Daughter Of Royal Vazir	DD National
1998	Rishtey – Maa	Usha (Episode 39)	Zee TV
1999	Jai Hanuman	Maharani Satyabhama	DD National
2000–2003	Shree Ganesh	Devi Aditi	Sony Entertainment Television
2001	Jaane Anjaane	Rashmi Vashisht	DD National
2001–2002	Jap Tap Vratt	Devi Lakshmi	DD National
2001–2002	Om Namo Narayan	Devi Parvati	Sahara One
2001–2002	Jai Santoshi Maa	Devi Buddhi	Zee TV
2003	Maharathi Karna	Dhatri	DD National
2003	Ghar Sansaar	Shweta Chaudhary	DD National
2004	Tum Bin Jaaoon Kahaan	Aditi	Zee TV
2004	Raat Hone Ko Hai – Jaanwar: Part 1 to Part 4	Episode 121 to Episode 124	Sahara One
2006	Woh Rehne Waali Mehlon Ki	Jaylakshmi	Sahara One
2006–2007	Kesar	Muskaan Maliya	Star Plus
2007–2009	Stree Teri Kahani	Radha	DD National
2008–2009	Rakhi	Gunjan Amber Thakur	Zee TV
2009	Ganesh Leela		Sahara One
2010	Rehna Hai Teri Palkon Ki Chhaon Mein	Paro	Imagine TV
2012	Bhai Bhaiya Aur Brother	Juhi Rajeev Patel	Sony SAB
2013	Devon Ke Dev...Mahadev	Devi Aditi	Life OK
2016	Siya Ke Ram	Devi Ahilya	Star Plus
2018–2019	Internet Wala Love	Pratima Shubhankar Verma	Colors TV
2021–2022	Thoda Sa Badal Thoda Sa Paani	Lekha Shyam Mukherjee	Colors TV
2023	Baalveer 3	Adishi	Sony SAB
