= Dotara (film) =

2019 Bengali action drama film

- Teaser poster
- Directed by: Amitabha Dasgupta
- Screenplay by: Amitabha Dasgupta
- Story by: Amitabha Dasgupta
- Produced by: Tapasi Dasgupta
- Starring: Snigdha Pandey; Subrat Dutta; Biswajit Chakraborty; Sonali Chowdhury; Dipankar Dey
- Edited by: Tapas Chakraborty
- Music by: Shanku Mitra; Kalyan Sen Barat
- Production company: Tapasi Dasgupta Communication
- Release date: 11 January 2019
- Running time: 125 minutes
- Country: India
- Language: Bengali

Dotara is an action-drama Bengali film directed by Amitabha Dasgupta and produced by Tapasi Dasgupta Communication. The film starring an ensemble of Subrat Dutta, Rajesh Sharma, Snigdha Pandey, Sonalee Chaudhuri, Dipankar Dey, Biswajit Chakraborty, Suman Banerjee, Pradip Bhattacharya and Swantana Basu, explores the idea of identity crisis among a small community of people settled in the north-eastern part of West Bengal. The film was theatrically released on 11 January 2019.

== Cast ==
- Biswajit Chakraborty
- Dipankar Dey
- Snigdha Pandey
- Sonali Chowdhury
- Subrat Dutta
- Rajesh Sharma
- Suman Banerjee
- Pradip Bhattacharya
- Swantana Basu

== Release ==
The official trailer of the film was launched on 22 July 2018.

The film was theatrically released on 11 January 2019.

== Soundtrack ==
Dotara

Soundtrack album by Shanku Mitra and Kalyan Sen Barat
- Released: 18 July 2018
- Recorded: 2018
- Genre: Feature film soundtrack
- Length: 33:36
- Language: Bengali
- Label: Zee Music Company
External audio
- Audio Jukebox on YouTube

The soundtrack was composed by Shanku Mitra and Kalyan Sen Barat on lyrics of Gautam Ghoshal, Shyamal Sengupta, Tarun Sinha and Amitabha Dasgupta.

Track list
No.	Title	Lyrics	Music	Singer	Length
1.	"Khuje Jai Purono Khatay"	Gautam Ghoshal	Shanku Mitra	Raghab Chatterjee, Smita Bakshi	7:24
2.	"Danay Jomeche Dhulo"	Gautam Ghoshal	Shanku Mitra	Shaan	4:38
3.	"Tomake Tomakei Mone Pore"	Shyamal Sengupta	Shanku Mitra	Javed Ali	5:25
4.	"Oho Re Dotara Mor"	Tarun Sinha	Kalyan Sen Barat	Lopamudra Mitra	6:03
5.	"Ogo Aakash Balo Balo"	Shyamal Sengupta	Shanku Mitra	Madhushree	4:31
6.	"Kon Ajana Mon"	Amitabha Dasgupta	Shanku Mitra	Soham	5:35
Total length:					33:36
