= Anannya Nattya Goshthi =

Bengali Theatre group

Anannya Nattya Goshthi (Bengali: অনন্যা নাট্য গোষ্ঠী) is a Bengali theatre group. The group is located in Chandpur, Bangladesh, and was founded on 24 October 1974.

== Productions ==
(in alphabetical order)

- Ingit
