= Boond Aur Samudra =

1956 novel by Amritlal Nagar

Boond Aur Samudra (English: Drop and Ocean) is a 1956 Hindi novel by Indian novelist Amritlal Nagar. The novel presents an artistic depiction of the middle-class citizens of Lucknow, the hometown of the author.

== Introduction ==
Boond Aur Samudra is considered to be a great novel by Amritlal Nagar both in terms of its size and subject matter. It was first published in 1956 by Kitab Mahal, Allahabad, and was published again in 1998 in paperbacks by Rajkamal Prakashan, New Delhi.

== Themes ==
In Boond Aur Samudra, 'Bund' (drop) represents the individual and 'Samudra' (ocean) represents the society. In another way the symbolism of this name proves to be meaningful. The author has chosen Lucknow for the story area in this novel and especially the streets of Chowk. In the picture of a locality, the author has shown many forms of Indian society. In this way through the introduction of 'Bund ', an attempt to introduce 'Samudar' is symbolized. In this novel the interrelationship between individual and society has been explored on a broad spectrum.

The society described in this novel is immediately after the independence of the country. Nagar has centered it in a mohalla chowk of Lucknow for illustration. The characters playing the main part in its story are - Sajjan, Vankanya, Mahipal and Nagin Chand Jain aka Colonel. A gentleman is an artist, a painter. Vankanya is an active conscious young girl who opposes the stereotype of free will. Mahipal is a passive writer pretending to be socialism and Naginchand Jain alias Colonel, despite being a businessman, is an active worker who is ready to help the downtrodden. Along with all this, the wonderful character of antiquity, superstition and extreme sharpness as well as pure compassion and irresistibly justified support forms the core of the novel. Sajjan is a family rich- grandson of Seth Kannomal. Eight hundred rupees a month's rent income is like a security cover for his artistry. Apart from this, there is a lot of property and property, there is a car, bungalow and a whole army of servants. Yet in spite of some suppressed rites of luxury, he works beyond luxury and rents a room in the square, desiring to give a new dimension to his art by studying the life of the locality. The latter also goes to his mansion after coming in close contact with Tai. Tai treats Sajjan as daughter-in-law and Vankanya as daughter-in-law despite initial opposition. Despite his inherited feudal rites, the gentleman rebuilds himself by coming in contact with Vankanya and contributes to social development and change. Due to contact with Vankanya, gradually many changes take place in her. He had an inter-caste marriage with Vankanya and due to thoughts as well as events, he reaches serious questions of woman's destiny and human faith.

== Creative Formation ==
In the making of this novel, the author has made a difficult and rare attempt to merge the 'Bund' as if in a 'Samudr'. Different situations and different levels of characters are present in this novel like group. Taking the help of the absolutely gentle love story of Sajjan and Vankanya, in this novel a forest of characters has been presented in a way and all of them have been handled skillfully to a great extent. The pictorial composition of women of different beliefs, statuses and levels is also made on seeing the fine depiction of the conditions of the less educated Indian society is a major part of the purpose of this novel. The stereotyped society, which is afraid of many, often shows cowardice, how the same becomes violent after seeing the danger on its stereotypes, it has been portrayed by the author with utmost credibility. In this way feudal rites deprive a person of taking meaningful direction and active steps and its practical depiction introduces the creative skill of the novel. The portrayal of an unsuccessful character in life like author Mahipal is also very lively and the overall characterization of Tai is so multifaceted, complete and coherent that it has been considered as one of the unique characters-creations of Hindi fiction and the polymorphic dialects of the locality. The collection of anthologies makes this novel a material source for linguistics. The effortlessly adapting the novel to its cosmopolitan form into interesting storytelling reveals itself as a proof of the success of the novel's craft and skill.

== Reception and criticism ==
The most balanced and largely complete review of 'Bund and Samudra' Dr. Ramvilas Sharma has been written. This review was first published in issue 20 of criticism (magazine). Then it was also compiled in Bhisham Sahni, Ramji Mishra and Bhagwati Prasad Nidariya edited 'Modern Hindi Novel' and then the same review was edited by Vibhuti Narayan Rai, a special issue focused on the centenary story of 'Current Literature' (in book form 'Katha') 100 Years of Literature'). In this review, Dr. Sharma, while showing the merits of this novel of his beloved storyteller, has not ignored its shortcomings. Despite showing its many features, he has clearly mentioned the author's ideological misconceptions, pictorial errors and descriptive pluralism - all the shortcomings and underlined the importance of the novel by considering it in a balanced way. He believes that despite all these flaws, Boond Aur Samudr is a beautiful novel. By pulling the veil of self-satisfaction from the top of Indian society, the author has revealed the horrors inside it in front of everyone. The amount of social experience accumulated in 'The Drop and the Sea' makes it an encyclopedia of its own kind. Would love to read it not once but again and again. There are some places which will not fill the mind even after reading it again and again. This is undoubtedly one of the best novels of independent India.

Nemi Chandra Jain After discussing its various merits and shortcomings, it is decided that Boond Aur Samudra is an important and powerful work of post-war Hindi novel, which has raised the level of evaluation more high and rigorous due to its unique achievement. demands to be kept. They consider it to be one of the most important novels of the last ten-fifteen years, with the potential of being the best work of that era, but considering it not to be like।

Madhuresh believes that even though both of Nagar's previous novels provide many indications of his future development prospects, Boond Aur Samudr can also be considered as one of his creative leaps, whose established record would go on to become It was not possible for him to break it himself – in spite of his long journey of creation.

Nagar was given the Batuk Prasad Award and Sudhakar Silver Medal by Nagari Pracharini Sabha, Varanasi for Boond Aur Samudra.

The novel was translated into Russian and its first edition sold out within a year.
