= Kunwara Baap (1942 film) =

- Directed by: Kishore Sahu
- Produced by: N. R. Acharya
- Starring: Kishore Sahu; Protima Dasgupta; Anjali Devi; Nana Palsikar
- Cinematography: Rajnikant Pandya
- Music by: Ramchandra Pal
- Production company: Acharya Arts Prod.
- Release date: 1942
- Country: India
- Language: Hindi

Kunwara Baap (Bachelor Father) is a 1942 Hindi comedy film directed by Kishore Sahu. The film was the directorial debut for Sahu, and N. R. Acharya's debut as a producer. Acharya had just started his production company Acharya Arts Productions. The story was written by Kishore Sahu who went on to write and direct films like Kali Ghata, Mayurpankh and others. The music direction was by Ramchandra Pal. The film had Kishore Sahu starring as the bachelor father with co-stars Protima Dasgupta, Anjali Devi, Nana Palsikar, Amritlal Nagar and Moni Chatterjee.

It was one of the winners for the BFJA - Best Indian Films Award for best film for 1943.

Prannath finds an infant abandoned in his car on his engagement day. The finding leads to several comedic situations in the film. The film was inspired by Bachelor Mother (1939), directed by Garson Kanin and starring Ginger Rogers. The story was reversed in Kunwara Baap, with the hero getting landed with the child.

== Plot ==
Prannath (Kishore Sahu) goes to the jeweller's to buy a ring for his to-be fiancée. While he is in the store, an unwed mother leaves her infant in the back of Prannath's car. When he comes out he realises that he is stuck with the baby much to his discomfiture as his betrothed refuses to believe his story. The situation gives rise to several funny sequences till the villainous father of the child admits to being the real father and agrees to marry the mother of the abandoned child.

== Cast ==
- Kishore Sahu
- Protima Dasgupta
- Baby Lal
- Anjali Devi
- Dhulia
- Manohar Ghatwani
- Moni Chatterjee
- Jamu Patel
- Hadi
- Amritlal Nagar
- Nana Palsikar

== Reception ==
The film became a big success commercially, and was a hit at the box office as well as with the critics. Citing it as a "sparkling comedy", Narwekar quotes that the film was hailed as a "sophisticated stream-lined comedy".

== Remakes ==
- Vazhkai (1949) a Tamil film, directed by A.V. Meiyappan and starring Vyjantimala in her debut role, drew inspiration from the Kunwara Baap's storyline.
- Bahar (1951) directed by M. V. Raman was the Hindi remake of Vazhkai.
- Kunwara Baap (1974) directed by Mehmood.

== Soundtrack ==
The music composer was Ramchandra Pal. Amritlal Nagar, a well-known Hindi writer wrote the lyrics for the film. The other lyricists were Baalam Pardesi and Satyakam Sharma.

=== Song list ===
#	Title
1	"Chai Piyogi Rani"
2	"Dol Gayi Haan Dol Gayi"
3	"Gazab Bhayo Rama Nazariya Laagi"
4	"Jadoo Daar Gayo Re Mope Baanke Bihari"
5	"Kaahe Paap Se Paap Chhipaye Re"
6	"Main Naachun Run Jhun"
7	"O Mori Rani O Mori Rani"
8	"Rone Ko Rahen Zinda"
9	"So Jaa Poot Lugayi Ke"
