= Richa Nagar =

Indian writer (born 1968)

Richa Nagar (born 1968, in Lucknow, India) is a scholar, writer, poet, theatre-worker, translator, and editor. Nagar is Professor Emeritus of Gender, Women, and Sexuality Studies at the University of Minnesota, where she had a long career as an anti-disciplinary educator, theorist and writer and held the title of Professor of the College, before joining Smith College as the inaugural Gloria Steinem ’56 Endowed Chair in Women and Gender Studies. Nagar's creative and scholarly work makes multi-lingual and multi-genre contributions to transnational feminism, social geography, critical development studies, and critical ethnography. Her research has encompassed a range of topics including: politics of space, identity and community among communities of South Asian origin in Tanzania; questions of empowerment in relation to grass-roots struggles in the global South, principally with the Sangtin Kisan Mazdoor Sangathan (SKMS) in Sitapur District, India; the politics of language and social fracturing in the context of development and neo-liberal globalization; and creative praxis that uses collaboration, co-authorship, and translation to blur the borders between academic, activist, and artistic labors. She has held residential fellowships at the Center for Advanced Study in the Behavioral Sciences (CASBS) at Stanford in 2005–2006, at the Jawaharlal Nehru Institute of Advanced Study (JNIAS) at New Delhi in 2011–2012, and at the Centre for Humanities Research at the University of the Western Cape in 2013. She was named Honorary Professor at the Unit for Humanities at the Rhodes University (UHURU) at Rhodes University in South Africa in 2017, and her work has been translated into several languages including Turkish, Marathi, Italian, German and Mandarin. Nagar is a founding editor of the online journal, AGITATE! Unsettling Knowledges.

== Work on the Politics of Place and Identity among 'Asians' in Tanzania ==
Richa Nagar's historical, geographical, and feminist exploration of the politics of place, identity, and community among 'Asians' in Tanzania is based on a "large number of life histories as well as participant observation" among Hindus, Khoja Shia Ithna Asheris, Goans and Sikhs, chiefly in the city of Dar es Salaam. This body of work is "significant for its geographical focus" and "provides a useful and very necessary corrective to the misperceptions" that "construct[ed] all Asians as a monolithic category." It highlights how "processes at multiple scales intersect and shape the negotiation of geographic and social space among different diasporic South Asian groups in their neighborhoods" while also "explor[ing] many relevant dimensions of the researcher-narrator relationship...[Nagar attends] to the processes involved in navigating within and across Dar's many Asian and African communities, with their particular spaces, boundaries, markers of identity, and hierarchies of power."

== Coauthoring Across Research and Activism ==
In 2004, Nagar published with eight rural women activists or Sangtins, the Hindi book, Sangtin Yatra which refers to a "journey of solidarity, reciprocity, and enduring friendship." The eight activists—Anupamlata, Ramsheela, Reshma Ansari, Richa Singh, Shashibala, Shashi Vaish, Surbala, and Vibha Bajpayee—collaborated with Richa Nagar to explore questions of power, location, and difference in their own lives through personal storytelling, while also engaging with issues of inequity and discrimination in NGOs that seek to empower poor rural women in the global south. This discussion of NGOs triggered a backlash against the authors, which is examined in the English version of the book, Playing with Fire: Feminist Thought and Activism Through Seven Lives in India (2006). Playing with Fire "challenges academic protocol and activist verities alike" and "grapples with creative solutions, such as upending hierarchies of skill and knowledge in organizations, as well as means to fight organizational dependency on donors...Every chapter makes for fascinating reading as the women emerge in their complexity, in their specificity, and in their international context that still includes outside donors driven by their own interests." The book "asks us to think in radically new ways about responsibility, access, research, agency, authorship, subjects, and audience. It contributes to the vibrant discourse on the politics of research particularly between the 'north' and 'south' [and] pushes at the boundaries of this discourse as it demonstrates different ways of engaging in collaborative work that challenges the separation between 'the academy' and 'political organizing'."

The debates triggered by Sangtin Yatra and Playing with Fire helped to build Sangtin Kisaan Mazdoor Sangathan or the Sangtin Farmers and Laborers Organization (SKMS) in the Mishrikh and Pisawan blocks of Sitapur District of Uttar Pradesh.. Nagar's book with Richa Singh in Hindi, Ek Aur Neemsaar: Sangtin Atmamanthan Aur Andolan (2012) tells the story of the birth and growth of SKMS. Playing with Fire and Sangtin Yatra have been translated into Turkish as Ateşle Oynamak: Hindistan'da Yedi Yaşam Üzerinden Feminist Düşünce ve Eylem (Ayizi Kitap, 2011) and into Marathi as Ageeshee Khelataana: Saat Stree Karyakartancha Sahpravaas (Manovikas Prakashan, 2015).

In Muddying the Waters: Coauthoring Feminisms Across Scholarship and Activism (2014), which received Gloria Anzaldua Book Prize's Honorable Mention, Richa Nagar examines coauthorship as a mode of sharing authority and addresses translation as ethical responsibility. The book "emerges out of the difficulties and (im)possibilities encountered in the creation of politically meaningful scholarship that inevitably crosses multiple borders. Those between academia and social movements, academic and nonacademic writing, or geographical and linguistic borders...Nagar's work is a call for politically engaged and ethical research that takes matters of epistemic violence seriously. For the author, such research cannot shy away from the tensions, risks and challenges involved in the building of solidarities and alliances between researchers and the researched 'on the ground.' These 'situated solidarities' are achievable when activists and scholars speak with each other to become 'radically vulnerable' through trust, affect and critical reflexivity without losing sight of their institutional, material and geopolitical positions.". Here, Nagar also introduces the concept of 'radical vulnerability' as a critical mode of collectivity in politically-engaged alliance-work—an idea that she and her critics have continued to explore further.

== Books in English ==
- 2019. Nagar, Richa, in journeys with Sangtin Kisan Mazdoor Sangathan and Parakh Theatre.Hungry Translations: Relearning the world through Radical Vulnerability. Urbana, Chicago, and Springfield:University of Illinois Press. 2019. ISBN 978-0-252-08440-9 (pbk), 978-0-252-04257-7(cloth).
- 2014. Nagar, Richa. Muddying the Waters: Co-authoring Feminisms Across Scholarship and Activism. Champaign: University of Illinois Press. 2014. ISBN 978-0252-080357 (pbk), 978-0252096754 (e-book) also available as Open Access version.
- 2010. Amanda Lock Swarr and Richa Nagar, editors. Critical Transnational Feminist Praxis. Albany: SUNY Press. 2010. ISBN 978-1438429380 (pbk)
- 2009. Eric S. Sheppard, Philip W. Porter, David Faust, and Richa Nagar. A World of Difference: Encountering and contesting development. Second fully revised and expanded edition. New York: Guilford Press. 2009. ISBN 978-1606232620 (pbk)
- 2006. Sangtin Writers and Richa Nagar. Playing with Fire: Feminist Thought and Activism Through Seven Lives in India. Minneapolis: University of Minnesota Press. 2006. ISBN 978-0816647705 (pbk)

== Books in Hindi ==
- 2025. Mumtaz Begum, Richa Nagar, Shashikala Rai. खारी नदी (Khari Nadi/ Salty River). New Delhi: Rajkamal Prakashan. ISBN 978-9360864637
- 2016. Richa Nagar (Sankalan-Sampaadan). मैं और मेरा मन: शरद नागर (Main aur Mera Man: Sharad Nagar). New Delhi: Kitabghar Prakashan. ISBN 978-93-81467-50-3
- 2012. Sangtin Lekhak Samooh: Anupamlata, Ramsheela, Reshma Ansari, Richa Nagar, Richa Singh, Shashibala, Shashi Vaish, Surbala, and Vibha Bajpayee. संगतिन यात्रा: सात ज़िन्दगियों में लिपटा नारी विमर्श (Sangtin Yatra: Saat Zindgiyon Mein Lipta Nari Vimarsh) (Web edition available) Revised edition with selected reviews and commentary on the 2004 edition of the book. New Delhi: Rajkamal Prakashan.
- 2012. Richa Nagar and Richa Singh. एक और नीमसार: संगतिन आत्ममंथन और आंदोलन (Ek Aur Neemsaar: Sangtin Atmamanthan aur Andolan) (Sequel to the 2004 book, 'Sangtin Yatra'). New Delhi: Rajkamal Prakashan, 2012. [On the Making of the Sangtin movement in Uttar Pradesh]. 2012. ISBN 812-6721944, 978-8126721948

== Articles on Collaboration, Friendships, and Radical Vulnerability in Research and Alliance Work ==
- 2016. Nagar, Richa with Özlem Aslan, Nadia Z. Hasan, Omme-Salma Rahemtullah, Nishant Upadhyay, and Begüm Uzun. Feminisms, Collaborations, Friendships: A Conversation. Feminist Studies 42:2: 502-519.
- Chowdhury, Elora Halim; Pulido, Laura; Heynen, Nik; Rini, Lainie; Wainwright, Joel; Inayatullah, Naeem; Nagar, Richa (December 2016). "Muddying the waters: coauthoring feminisms across scholarship and activism". Gender, Place & Culture. 23 (12): 1800–1812. doi:10.1080/0966369X.2016.1221880. S2CID 151688356.
- Dauphinee, Elizabeth (2016). "Editor's Introduction Interview Forum: Feminist and Postcolonial Feminist Theorists". Journal of Narrative Politics.
- 2013. Interview with Class War University: Desiring Alliance and Complex Translations in Activist Research (Conducted 11 July 2012, Posted July). http://classwaru.org/2013/07/25/desiring-alliance/
- 2012. Interview with Selda Tuncer: Richa Nagar'la Feminizmin Zor Sorulari Uzerine. AMARGI (Turkish feminist Journal) 25: June: 13-20. English Translation at: https://www.academia.edu/2541413/An_Interview_with_Richa_Nagar_An_Honest_Dialogue_on_Difficult_Questions_of_Feminism.
- Pratt, Geraldine (March 2008). "Book reviews: Authors meet critics: a set of reviews and response". Social & Cultural Geography. 9 (2): 213–236. doi:10.1080/14649360701859882. S2CID 147400697.
- 2007. Nagar, Richa and Susan Geiger. Reflexivity, Positionality and Identity in Feminist Fieldwork Revisited. In eds. Adam Tickell, Eric Sheppard, Jamie Peck and Trevor Barnes. Politics and Practice in Economic Geography. London: Sage, pp. 267–278.
- Benson, Koni; Nagar, Richa (October 2006). "Collaboration as Resistance? Reconsidering the processes, products, and possibilities of feminist oral history and ethnography". Gender, Place & Culture. 13 (5): 581–592. doi:10.1080/09663690600859083. S2CID 67850468.

== Articles on Globalization, Development, and Questions of Empowerment ==
- 2004. Nagar, Richa & Amanda L. Swarr. Organizing from the Margins: Grappling with "Empowerment" in India & South Africa. In eds. Lise Nelson and Joni Seagar. A Companion to Feminist Geography. London: Blackwell, pp. 291–304.
- 2004. Swarr, Amanda L. and Richa Nagar. Dismantling Assumptions: Interrogating "Lesbian" Struggles for Identity and Survival in India and South Africa. Signs: Journal of Women in Culture and Society 29:2:491-516.
- 2003. Nagar, Richa and Saraswati Raju. Women, NGOs and the Contradictions of Empowerment and Disempowerment. Antipode: A Radical Journal of Geography 35:1:1-13.
- 2002. Nagar, Richa, Victoria Lawson, Linda McDowell and Susan Hanson. Locating Globalization: Feminist (Re)readings of the Subjects and Spaces of Globalization. Economic Geography 78:3:257-284.
- 2001. Faust, David and Richa Nagar. English Medium Education, Social Fracturing, and the Politics of Development in Postcolonial India. Economic and Political Weekly July 28-August 3: 2878-2883.

== Articles on Politics of Identity, Place, and Community among 'Asians' in Tanzania ==
- 2014. Dar es Salaam, Making peace with an abandoned field. In R. Nagar, Muddying the Waters, Champaign: University of Illinois Press.
- 2001. Nagar, Richa. Saboteurs? Or Saviors? South Asian Magazine for Action & Reflection: Special Issue on South Asia and Africa. Winter/Spring:14-19.
- 2000. Nagar, Richa. "I'd Rather be Rude than Ruled": Gender, Place, and Communal Politics among South Asian Communities in Dar es Salaam. Women's Studies International Forum 23:5: 571-585.
- 2000. Nagar, Richa. Religion, Race and the Debate over Mut'a in Dar es Salaam. Feminist Studies 26:3: 661-690.
- 1998. Nagar, Richa and Helga Leitner. Contesting Social Relations in Communal Places: Identity Politics Among Asians in Dar es Salaam. In eds. Ruth Fincher and Jane Jacobs. Cities of Difference. New York: Guilford, pp. 226–251.
- 1998. Nagar, Richa. Communal Discourses, Marriage, and the Politics of Gendered Social Boundaries among South Asian Immigrants in Tanzania. Gender, Place and Culture 5:2: 117-139.
- 1997. Nagar, Richa. Communal Places and the Politics of Multiple Identities: The case of Tanzanian Asians. Ecumene: A Journal of Cultural Geographies 4:1: 3-26.
- 1997. Nagar, Richa. The Making of Hindu Communal Organizations, Places and Identities in Postcolonial Dar es Salaam. Environment and Planning D: Society and Space 15: 707-730.
- 1996. Nagar, Richa. The South Asian Diaspora in Tanzania: A History Retold. Comparative Studies of South Asia, Africa and the Middle East: A Journal of Politics, Culture and Economy 16:2: 62-80.
- 1993. Nagar, Richa. Indigenisation Debate and Tanzanian Asians. Africa World Review 5:24-25.
