= Ayushman Bhava =

Ayushman Bhava (Sanskrit: आयुष्मान् भव, romanized: āyuṣmān bhava) is a Sanskrit benedictory expression, meaning, "May you live long". It may also refer to:

- Ayushman Bhava (1998 film), an Indian Malayalam film
- Ayushman Bhava (2019 film), an Indian Kannada film
- Ayushman Bhava (TV series), a 2017 Indian Hindi television series
