= Ek Tha Raja Ek Thi Rani =

- Also known as: Raja-Rani
- Genre: Drama; Romance; Mystery
- Created by: Sphere Origins
- Screenplay by: Faizal Akhtar; Sweksha Bhagat
- Story by: Nilanjana Purkayastha; Rajita Sharma; Akash Deep; Dialogues; Aparajita Sharma; Divy Nidhi Sharma
- Directed by: Pawan Parkhi
- Creative director: Siddhartha Vankar. Snehil Dixit Mehra
- Starring: Drashti Dhami as Rani Gayatri Devi; Siddhant Karnick as Rana Indravadan Singh Deo; Eisha Singh as Rani Rajveer Singh/Naina Rajveer Singh; Sartaj Gill Kunwar Rajveer Singh/Raj Chauhan; Priya Tandon as Swarnalekha Lakshyaraj Singh
- Theme music composer: Raju Singh; Siddhartha Vankar
- Composer: Aashish Regoo
- Country of origin: India
- Original language: Hindi
- No. of seasons: 3
- No. of episodes: 504

Production
- Producers: Sujoy Wadhwa; Comall Sunjoy Wadhwa
- Production locations: Rajasthan; Mumbai
- Camera setup: Multi-camera
- Running time: 20–22 minutes
- Production company: Sphere Origins

Original release
- Network: Zee TV
- Release: 27 July 2015 – 4 July 2017

Ek Tha Raja Ek Thi Rani (English: Once There was a King and Queen) is an Indian television period drama that aired on Zee TV on 27 July 2015. The show initially focused on the love story of Rani Gayatri (Drashti Dhami) and Ranaji (Siddhant Karnick) (Season 1). However, due to the deaths of their characters, the show focused on Rani (Eisha Singh), their daughter, and their son-in law, Raja (Sartaj Gill). However, the character of Rani also died, and her lookalike was introduced as Naina (also led by Eisha Singh). But again the main characters were killed (Raja and Naina died). But the show retained its main lead as it was shown that Raja and Rani had re-taken births as Raj and Rani, respectively. The show went off air on 4 July 2017. The show previously took a seven-year leap, followed by a 12-year leap, followed by a four-month leap, followed by a ten-year leap, and ended by a several years leap, after which these characters died in a car accident, leaving behind their daughter.

== Plot ==
=== Season 1 ===
Ek Tha Raja Ek Thi Rani is set in the 1940s. In 1945, Ranaji returned to Ameerkot after six years of fighting the war against the British. Gayatri is the daughter of a rich zamindar, but she is considered Manglik, inauspicious by birth. On the other hand, Rana Indravadhan Singh is the king of Amerkot who has been traumatised after his first wife, Rani Sulakshana death. Ranaji's mother, Rajmata Priyamvada, has a debt to pay to Gayatri's father, so she offers Ranaji's hand in marriage instead. Unwillingly, Ranaji marries Gayatri.

After marriage, Ranaji and Gayatri slowly form a bond. However, challenges are presented by family members like Badi Rani Maa, a woman pretending to be Sulakshana, Avdhesh, Rageshowri and so on.

Due to Badi Rani Maa and Rageshowri, Ranaji marries Rageshowri and loses his memory, and forgets Gayatri. Gayatri is thrown off a cliff by Badi Rani Maa. She is then saved by Lukhan and then disguises as Savitri to help Ranaji regain his memory. On the other hand, Lakshyaraj, Chandravadan's son, discovers that Gayatri is alive. He tells Badi Rani Maa this truth before he dies due to a spear passing through his chest during a performance at the festival of colours. Badi Rani Maa later confirms and realizes it is true. She tries to bring Ranaji and Savatri together in order to expose Savatri as Gayatri to King Rana.

On the day she wants to real the truth about Badi Rani Maa and Rageshwari to King Rana, Badi Rani Maa poses so many threats all to no avail, such as planting a bomb in Gayatri's carriage, and even sending a man to kill the priest who has come to testify against Badi Rani Maa. Everything seemed to be in the favour of Gayatri as the priest's testimony convinces Ranaji, until Badi Rani Maa exposes Savatri's real face in front of every one by pouring water on her.

King Rana becomes angry again, and sends Gayatri and Rajmata to the dungeon. Later he meets Gayatri to tell him the truth. They then decide to redo everything on the cliff again. Badi Rani Maa tries to convince Ranaji to just kill Rajmata and Gayatri, as it is how politics is played. But she fails in her attempt.

On the hill, Badi Rani Maa has once again already exchanged the fake bullets with real ones. This time Ranaji decides to shoot Gayatri. As Gayatri is shot by Ranaji, he begins to experience a trauma. Badi Rani Maa begins to laugh and jubilate on the hill that Gayatri is finally dead. But Gayatri finally gets up and so does Ranaji. King Rana reveals to Badi Rani Maa that he switched the bullets again after she put real bullets. Badi Rani Maa then calls her goons to kill Ranaji. She reveals that she suspected something could happen so she came prepared.

But Rajmata intervenes the scene with her own guards who arrest Badi Rani Maa's goons. Badi Rani Maa then removes a big gun from clothes and points it at King Rana's face. All hope seems to be lost until Swarnalekha and Lukhan throw a stick at Badi Rani Maa's head, knocking her out. Badi Rani Maa and Rageshwari are sent to the dungeon. Happiness returns to the inhabitants of the palace as Lukhan and Swarna, Lakshyaraj's wife are getting married.

But with the help of her son, Kunwar Chandravadan, The vengeful Badi Rani Maa comes to grace the occasion with a jungle man named Kaal. Kaal kills Ranaji during a faceoff. He also throws a knife at Swarnalekha. As he tries to kill Gayatri by Badi Rani Maa's orders, Lukhan saves Gayatri and they escape along with Rajmata from the palace. Later Swarna wakes up to find dead bodies everywhere including King Rana. Badi Rani Maa imprisons Swarna until she gives birth to Lukhan's child.

Gayatri steals Ranaji's body from his burial conducted by the deceitful Badi Rani Maa. She then gives him a proper burial among the loyal men of Ameerkot. She then rescues her mother from Badi Rani Maa, who wishes to use her mother to get to Gayatri by threatening to hang the mother if Gayatri does not come in front of her.

==== 9 months later ====
Gayatri gives birth to a baby girl. During these nine months, the women were trained by Rajmata to fight, since King Kaal had decreed that any pregnant woman should be killed in search of Gayatri. After giving birth to her child, she goes to the palace with her baby, Rajmata, Lukhan and her army to fight Badi Rani Maa and Kaal. Meanwhile, Kaal becomes the king of Ameerkot, supported by Badi Rani Maa since she had a dream when Kaal threatened her to become the king of Ameerkot.

Meanwhile, her son Kunwar Chandravadan was expecting to be the king. While Gayatri triumphs in finishing Kaal off and reclaiming the throne of Ameerkot, Badi Rani Maa goes to beg Gayatri, but Gayatri does not believe her. She kicks her away. When the Queen grandmother regains consciousness, she tries to kill Gayatri's baby who is tied to her, Gayatri's back, but stabs Gayatri instead.

But before Gayatri falls down, she also leaves Badi Rani Maa with a gift. She renders her handicapped by cutting one of her hands with a sword. Kaal finishes off Gayatri and she dies, while Rajmata and the baby escape. Ranaji and Gayatri reunite in heaven.

Rajmata and the baby girl are met by Chandravadan who has orders from his mother, Badi Rani Maa to kill them. He then spares their lives as Rajmata is able to convince him that Badi Rani Maa will never give him the throne. That she has given it to Kaal, an outsider instead of her own son. Rajmata, Lukhan, and the baby girl are in a vehicle to another place. They name the baby girl, "Rani".

=== Season 2 ===
==== 7 years later ====
India has gained independence and the British officials have left. Gayatri's and Ranaji's daughter, Rani, grows up under Rajmata's care. She goes to the royal palace to work as a servant and befriends Raja, Jeevan, and Bindu. Raja and Jeevan are Kaal's sons, and Bindu is Swarnalekha and Lakhan's unaware daughter. Kaal has become the King. Badi Rani Maa gives Rani series of tests, such as to come down from a tall point, to play a game of snakes and ladders involving riddles at every ladder, and also the test in which Rani had to give away her salary so that the other servants can get their salary. All these test is because Rani challenged Badi Rani Maa to stop her injustice against the servants of the palace.

Meanwhile, Rajmata suffers from tuberculosis. When Badi Rani Maa realizes that she is losing her grip on Raja, she decides to play her old game - being nice in the front to her enemies, while backstabbing them in the back. Raja and Rani are separated during their childhood due to the plans of Badi Rani Maa. Raja is accused of terribly beating Jeevan, Rageshwari's son. Because of this, Kaal sends Raja to a boarding school, where he is maltreated.

Rani leaves Amerkot along with Rajmata after the deaths of Lakhan and his love, Swarnalekha, as planned by Badi Rani Maa. She kills Lakhan with a knife and shoots Swarnalekha with a gun, as they are on their way to find Rajmata and Rana and Gayatri's daughter, Rani, who Badi Rani Maa is unaware of her identity. Since Raja is in the hostel, Badi Rani Maa uses the opportunity to turn Raja against Kaal, saying that Kaal does not want him to come home. Raja hates his father. He also hates Rani, as he believes that it is because of her he got sent to the boarding school. Badi Rani Maa also tells Bindu to be writing letters to Raja telling him how much she cares for him. She also tells Raja not to allow any girl like Rani to come into his life ever again.

Meanwhile, Rani and Rajmata are in another town. They work in a hospital. Rajmata then becomes seriously ill because the tuberculosis has spread all over her body. She then undergoes operation. She survives it and she lives together with Rani and a nurse from the hospital. Rani wonders when she will get the chance to meet Raja in order to clear up their misunderstanding.

==== 10 years later ====
Raja and Rani meet again in college. This time, when Raja meets Rani, he starts to create trouble for her as he believes that Rani was responsible for sending him to a boarding school. However, they gradually fall in love. On the day of their wedding, Raja finds out that Rani is Ranaji and Gayatri's daughter, and they were murdered by Kaal and Badi Rani Maa, but they marry anyway. Raja imprisons Kaal and Badi Rani Maa dies while trying to kill Rani. Bindu is also arrested. Rani avenges her parents' murders.

Some months later, Nawab Iqbal Khan enters their life bringing a new challenge for Raja and Rani. He accuses Raja of killing his fiancée Zahira. Later it is revealed that Jeevan was the one that killed Zahira. But only Jeeves/Jeevan, Raja's brother and Shusti, Raja's college friend knew about this secret, since they were the ones that buried the lady. They lied to Rani that no accident took place. Although Shusti wanted to tell the truth, he was threatened by Jeevan. Iqbal decides to punish Raja by shooting him at a cliff. Raja then falls down the cliff in Rani's presence.

==== 4 months later ====
Raja returns, saved by Bindu. He sees Rani and Iqbal together. It is then revealed that Rani is pretending to love Iqbal to avenge Raja's death, unknowing that Raja is actually alive. Meanwhile, Raja seeks revenge from Rani and Iqbal, disguising himself as Angad, Bindu's husband, but Rani recognizes him. Iqbal continues to plot against them, and Raja starts to hate Rani. Iqbal forces Rani to shoot Raja against her will. As Raja runs away from Iqbal's goons, he survives as he is saved by a don. Raja begins illegal work for the don, in which he harms three police officers.

Iqbal takes Rani along with him in his car to see the weak "Raja". They spot Raja near the ocean trying to kill himself with a gun. Rani takes the opportunity to cause an accident as she drags the steering wheel with Iqbal. Iqbal dies in the accident and Rani dies in a hospital. Raja falls in bad company and becomes associated with criminals, still believing Rani deceived him and unaware that she is dead.

==== 10 years later ====
Raja is now a don in Mumbai and starts to live with Laila, the daughter of another don. Naina, Rani's look-a-like, is a junior artist in films and lives with her mother and sister. Raja thinks that Naina is Rani and starts to hate her. On the other hand, Vijay, a police officer, likes Naina. Raja learns that Rani is dead and that Naina is her look-alike but still dislikes her as she reminds him of Rani.

Gradually, his attitude towards Naina normalizes and a love triangle develops. On the day of his wedding to Laila, Raja calls it off. Laila blames Naina. Naina encounters Rani's spirit that helps her prove to Raja that Rani was innocent and sacrificed herself to avenge him. Vijay tries to rape Naina and breaks her legs. Laila uses this to try and defame Naina but Raja marries Naina to protect her. Laila attacks Naina on several occasions but finally dies, as she is eaten by crocodiles in the water, a trap which she had set for Naina.

Raja thinks he's getting a fresh start in life and starts to love Naina and takes her on a honeymoon to Goa. Here, he meets Rani's spirit, who now becomes a ghost and has turned dark. Rani wants Raja to unite with her in the spirit world. Rani's spirit is revealed to be controlled by Badi Rani Maa's spirit.

All the inhabitants of the palace come to know of the return of Rani and Badi Rani Maa. Badi Rani Maa attacks the family of Priyamvada on several occasions, as she had told Rajmata that she wants to play with them for a few days before she kills them. Her attacks range from making Naina to dance, trying to turn Naina to stone, putting Vikrant, Laila's younger brother in a box, trying to kill Priyamvada, locking Naina in a bottle, etc. Priyamvada is able to rescue Rani from Badi Rani Maa spell, as she helps Rani to attain moshka, and Rani goes to the spirit world. Finally, with the help of the priest, they are able to trick Badi Rani Maa that Rajmata is dead, as Rajmata decided to lay down her life for Raja and Naina to be spared by Badi Rani Maa. Raja tells Rajmata to leave for America in the morning, so that she can be safe.

In the final episode of Badi Rani Maa's attacks, she returns to the palace in the morning, infuriated how Rajmata put up a very great performance to trick her. As she tries to enter into the palace, she is unable because the priest told Rajmata and her family to tie a thread around the doors and windows of the palace. Queen grandmother still tries to get in but ends up losing her powers. She goes back to meet the witch doctor that brought her back to life to give her more power. She returns to the palace, and the thread can no longer stop her. This time, she wastes no time in executing her evil plans. She immediately disguises herself as Raja and leads Naina into a trap, where she stabs Naina in front of the real Raja. Then she also stabs Raja. She makes Naina's mother and Rekha, Naina's sister, to hit their head on objects and fall down. Rajmata arrives at the scene to see Naina and Raja on the ground.

Badi Rani Maa then makes Raja to strangle himself. The two die holding hands together. As Badi Rani Maa celebrates, she slips on Raja's blood. She then remembers the words that the witch doctor told her that if an honest man's blood touches her, she will lose all her powers. She still rejoices as she fades away. Rajmata cries as Raja and Naina are dead. She tries to kill herself with the same knife but the priest stops her. She tells the priest to bring them back but he says he cannot since he cannot decide one's destiny. Rajmata tells him not to preach about God to her.

The priest tells Rajmata that Raja and Rani are destined to return to prove that nothing is more powerful than true love.

=== Season 3 ===
==== 20 years later ====
Raja and Rani are reborn as Raj and Rani. Raj is appointed the security guard of Rani to her dislike. When her wedding is fixed to Kundan, she asks Raj to abduct her. Raj and Rani end up in Amerkot, and Rani feels a strange connection to the place. She finds Rani Gayatri's diary and pursues Raj. Raj is then told to kill Rani to save his brother Dev who is being held captive by Rani's aunt, Anandi. Raj explains his situation to Rani but doesn't reveal Anandi's identity.

At home, Rani fakes her marriage to Raj and saves both Raj and Dev. Anandi is revealed to have killed Rani's father and is sent to prison. Rani agrees to marry Kundan, who wants her money and plans to leave her behind after marriage to live in London. Anandi is released and also wants Rani's wealth.

Raj reveals Kundan's intentions to Rani and her mother, who thank him. Rani and Raj fall in love, but her mother gives him three months to prove his love. Rani convinces Raj to visit Amerkot, where they find a painting of Raja and Rani and Badi Rani Maa. Rajmata reappears and tells them that this is their rebirth.

Badi Rani Maa returns to the palace once more. This time, she returns with darker magic. She now has minions, which attack Raj and Rani before she later reveals herself to them. She engages in a faceoff against Raj, Rani and the priest that told Rajmata about Raj and Rani's rebirths. Everything goes well as the priest puts a shield around them to shield them from Badi Rani Maa's attacks. Rajmata stands next to Badi Rani Maa and watches everything.

But things take an unexpected turn when Badi Rani Maa disarms the shield protecting them. She then throws a knife at the priest and a spear at Raj. Badi Rani Maa tells Rajmata that hatred still wins over love. As she tries to throw a spear at Rani, the priest wakes up, and the shield is established once more. Rajmata then sprinkles holy water on Badi Rani Maa, and she disappears. The priest dies while Raj is taken for medical attention.

Badi Rani Maa sends an arrow to Rani with a note telling her that the cure to a witch's spell cannot be found easily, that if she wants witch medicine, then she must give something to her in return for Raja's life. Rani and Priyamvada go to meet Badi Rani Maa. The Queen grandmother tells Rani to give her the holy water in exchange for Raj's life. The Queen mother tells Rani not to do it, but she then accepts. When Rani gives the holy water to Badi Rani Maa, she begins to laugh and breaks the bottle of holy water on the ground. Priyamvada falls to the ground. As Badi Rani Maa is making some chants, the Queen mother gets up immediately, meaning that she was pretending, and brings out the real holy water which she had hidden in her clothes and begins to sprinkle it on the Queen grandmother. Rani then cuts Badi Rani Maa's choti i.e. her hair, totally killing her. Raj later recovers and they return to the palace.

After defeating Badi Rani Maa, Raj and Rani get married. Raj later discovers that it was Rani's mother that made him and his mother's lives miserable when he was young. He now decides to tell Rani all of this by showing Rani his home, mother and sister. He tells Rani that her mother was also responsible for his father's death when he was a child. Raj then throws Rani off the cliff. Raj thinks he has won as he has property papers which he tricked Rani to sign as an insurance document, stating that all of Rani's properties is his. But because of the rain storm, the signatures of Rani is cleaned from the property papers. Raj becomes sad.

At the palace, Rani's mother receives a phone call that Rani has been found. As they meet her, they realize that she has lost her memory. They try to bring Rani's memory back. Rani brings Raj's mother and sister to the palace. Rani finally regains her memory.

Later on, Rani gives birth to twins, but one of the twins was kidnapped by Vasundhara, a woman who is an enemy of Raj and Rani. Raj and Rani leave their other child Siddhi and set out on a journey to find the missing twin Riddhi. As Raj is driving the vehicle, Rani begins to lose hope as she tells Raj that it has been a day and they have not found Riddhi. Raj tells Rani that they will find the child. As Raj tries to convince Rani not to doubt, they engage in an argument. This results in their vehicle hitting a tree, which then explodes, killing them.

==== 18 years later ====
18 years later, Raj and Rani's daughter Siddhi has become 18 years of age and is given a book with the title (Ek Tha Raja, Ek Thi Rani) as a birthday gift from her grandmother. Her twin sister, Riddhi, who is still alive, is shown with Vasundhara, the woman who kidnapped her when she was a baby. Riddhi is seen stealing money from a place and beating up a police officer. She sings happy birthday to herself as she walks away from the scene of the crime. She presents the money to Vasundhara. Meanwhile, Siddhi's coronation as the Queen of Ameerkot then takes place in the palace. As the priest hands the staff to her, she rejects it and goes to her parents' pictures and offers prayers to them. She decides that Ameerkot no longer needs a queen. The serial ends with her in front of Raj and Rani's pictures.

== Cast ==
=== Main ===
- Siddhant Karnick as Rana Indravardhan Singh Deo: Former King of Ameerkot; Devvardhan and Priyamvada's son; Gayatri's husband; Rani's father; Riddhi and Siddhi's grandfather (2015—2016)
- Drashti Dhami as Rani Gayatri Indravardhan Singh Deo: Former Queen consort of Ameerkot; Govind and Sethani's daughter; Indravardhan's second wife; Rani's mother; Riddhi and Siddhi's grandmother (2015—2016)
- Sartaj Gill as
  - Raj "Raja" Singh: Kaal's son; Jeevan's brother; Rani and Naina's husband (2016)
    - Swar Hingonia as child Raj (2016)
  - Rajveer "Raj" Singh: Raj's reborn; Dev's brother; Rani's husband; Siddhi and Riddhi's father (2016—2017) (Dead)
- Eisha Singh as
  - Rani Raj Singh: Princess of Ameerkot; Indravardhan and Gayatri's daughter; Raj's first wife (2016)
    - Mahima Joshi as child Rani (2016)
  - Naina Raj Singh: Rani's look-alike; Rekha's sister; Raj's second wife (2016)
  - Rani Rajveer Singh: Rani's reborn; Rajveer's wife; Siddhi and Riddhi's mother (2016—2017)
- Anita Raj as Rajmata Priyamvada Devvardhan Singh Deo: Former Queen consort of Ameerkot; Devvardhan's wife; Indravardhan's mother; Rani's grandmother; Siddhi and Riddhi's great-grandmother (2015—2017)
- Surekha Sikri as Badi Rani Maa Bhagyavanti Suryavardhan Singh Deo aka Dakini: Former Queen consort of Ameerkot; Suryavvardhan's second wife; Chandravardhan's mother; Devvardhan's step-mother; Lakshyaraj's grandmother; Indravardhan's step-grandmother; Rani's step-great-grandmother; Riddhi and Siddhi's step-great-great-grandmother (2015—2017)

=== Recurring ===
- Moon Banerjee as Sethani Damyanti Devi, Gayatri's mother (recurring Season 1) (2015–16)
- Akshay Anand as Kunwar Chandravadan Singh Deo (recurring Season 1–2) (2015–16)
- Parul Chaudhary as Kunwarani Kokila Chandravadan Singh Deo (recurring Season 1–2) (2015–16)
- Anjum Fakih as Rageshwari Singh (recurring season 1-2): Rana's third wife; Rani Singh Deo's step-mother (2015-2016)
- Puneet Sharma as Lakhan (2015–16)
- Priya Tandon as Choti Kunwarani Swarnalekha Lakshyaraj Singh Deo (2015–16)
- Ritesh M M Shukla as Bhuvan Kaka (recurring Season 3) (2017)
- Aakash Talwar as Kunder (recurring Season 3) (2017)
- Usha Bachani as Anandi (recurring Season 3) (2017)
- Dolly Sohi as Sunanda (2017)
- Praggya Sethi as Preeti (recurring Season 3) (2017)
- Suyyash Rai as Vijay (recurring Season 2) (2017)
- Mohammed Iqbal Khan as Nawab Iqbal Khan (2016–17)
- Neha Mishra as Meenu/Gayatri's friend (2016–17)
- Shivangi Sharma/Purva Parag as Rani Ambika Singh (2016–17)
- Sudesh Berry as Don (recurring Season 2) (2017)
- Poonampreet Bhatia as Kunwari Bindu Singh Deo/Lovely (2016–17)
- Deepshikha Nagpal as Abida, Iqbal's step mother (2017)
- Chetan Hansraj as Maharaja Kaal Singh (2016)
- Zaan Khan as Kunwar Jeevan Singh(2016)
- Vijay Kalvani as Vice Principal Mr. Chaubey/Chilgoza (2016)
- Ajay Arya as Lakshyaraj Chandravadan Singh Deon (2015–16)
- Astha Agarwal as Jhumki (the false Sulakshana. First wife of Rana Indravadan) (2015)
- Vineet Sharma as Sartaj (recurring Season 1) (2015)
- Amardeep Garg as Bhairav Yogi
- Abhiram Nain as Avdesh Singh Chauhan (recurring Season 1; 2016; dead)
- Darshan Jariwala as Seth Govinddas (2015)
- Jayna Tida as Rani Sulakshana: Rana's first wife; Rani Singh Deo's step-mother (2015)
- Ahmad Harhash as Raja Singhn(2015–16)

=== Guest appearances ===
- Mouni Roy, in a dance performance in the New Year Special (2016)
- Karan Wahi, in a dance performance (2016)
- Rashami Desai, in a dance performance (2016)
- Sonal Vengurlekar, Ranaji's friend and also to promote her show, Yeh Vaada Raha (TV series) in which she has retaken birth as Survi (dead)
- Ankush Arora, Ranaji's friend's lover and also to promote his show, Yeh Vaada Raha (TV series) along with Sonal Vergunlekar in which he is reborn as Karthik

== Production ==
=== Casting ===
Drashti Dhami was roped in the play the lead as Gayatri. Speaking about her comeback to television post her last show Madhubala – Ek Ishq Ek Junoon, she said “I do feel a little under pressure since ‘Madhubala’ was such a success. But I am also looking forward to seeing my fans’ reaction to my new show. Even my family and friends are very excited,” “It found it difficult to speak in the dialect which people spoke at that time. That was challenging. Other than that, I did not have any issues with the role,”

== Accolades ==
- Indian Television Academy Awards - Best Actress in a Negative Role - Won
