= Behenein =

- Written by: R M Joshi; Mitesh Shah; Swati Shah; Swati Pande; Garima Goyal
- Directed by: Sameer Kulkarni; Ankush Mohla
- Creative director: Sandiip Sikcand
- Starring: See Below
- Opening theme: "Teri Akhiyon Mein"
- Country of origin: India
- Original language: Hindi
- No. of episodes: 325

Production
- Producers: Jamnadas Majethia; Aatish Kapadia
- Running time: 24 minutes
- Production company: Hats Off Productions

Original release
- Network: StarPlus
- Release: 8 February 2010 – 29 April 2011

Behenein (transl. Sisters) is an Indian television soap opera broadcast on StarPlus from 8 February 2010 to 29 April 2011. Produced by JD Majethia's Hats Off productions, it stars Aalesha Syed, Shiju Kataria, Adaa Khan and Ojaswi Aroraa.

This is the story of four sisters, Purva, Smriti, Aakashi and Anokhi who live in Baroda with their parents, Sevantilal and Revti Shastri.

== Plot ==
The story revolves around the four rich and beautiful Shastri sisters – Purva, Smriti, Aakashi, and Anokhi, who live with their parents, and later, their widowed aunt.

The story starts with Purva Shastri's wedding. Suddenly, fire burns their parent's room and they die. Then, she decides to postpone the wedding due to their parent's death. After that, their aunt comes to their house with her son. She wants to embezzle her brother's property. But the problem occurs when their aunt finds a will and the will says the whole property will go to Neema only after the sisters get married. Smriti is happily married to her rich college sweetheart Mihir. Her sisters do not want to disclose the fact that their parents are dead because the information could be harmful to Smriti as she was pregnant at that time. After some days, Smriti learns of everything during her baby shower ceremony. Then, she becomes ill and her delivery takes place at the hospital. She gives birth to a boy and names him Prem. Then, with unbearable torture her evil mother-in-law Kamini and sister-in-law Shalaka drive her insane by proving her an irresponsible mother. Ultimately, Smriti is taken to a mental hospital. Then, her husband decides to remarry by pressure. On the other hand, a good doctor comes to do treatment of Smriti. Purva looks after her child but Purva finally finds that without having the intention for looking after Prem, Mansi as well as her family desire the property of Sanghvi's family. After that Purva comes to the wedding party by wearing the wedding dress and marries Mihir. She discloses Manshi's intention and as a result the family members drive away them. Suddenly, Smriti dies in a road accident.

Along with the time passing Purva and Mihir come closer to each other. Again Neema hires Samir to rape Anokhi whom Anokhi takes a liking to in college. When Samir tries to rape Anokhi then suddenly Purva comes to save her. Samir accepts his mistakes but he doesn't disclose Neema's real identity even though he wanted to and her therefore goes for ever. Then, Neema makes another plan for kidnapping Aakashi. She gets Shyamad to forcefully marry Aakashi on the day of her wedding to her long term boyfriend and fiancé Kshitij. When Purva gets photo of Aakashi's wedding then they come to know the wedding happened between Aakashi and Shyamad Das whom Aakashi has detested since the beginning because of his poor status. Aakashi now goes to the house of Shyamad, seeking vengeance. Shyamad and his family are the servants of Mihir's family. Aakashi makes much trouble for him and his family but she ends up developing a close bond with her in-laws and begins to like living there even though she loved all her luxuries she was provided since birth. After that, an accident happens to Akashi and Shyamad and Aakashi become closer and eventually fall in love.

Later, Aastha is introduced who looks exactly like Smriti. Aastha appears with her pretend husband, Karan to avoid suspicions. It has been disclosed that Aastha is originally Smriti. Smriti was revealed to be alive and she came back but when she saw Purva and Mihir marrying she was heartbroken and left. Anokhi finds the matter first when she hears Smriti singing Prem's lullaby which she used to sing. Then, for a long time everything is going in a straight way until the entrance of Bhavesh who takes an instant liking to Anokhi and often teases her. When everything is going well then Jigna's death who is Bhavesh's sister happens as a result of Shyamad Das and he is blamed which causes a rift between Anokhi and Aakashi as she sides with her husband and Anokhi with Bhavesh. Purva tries to unite the two and Shyamad is declared innocent. It was revealed that Jigna was killed by Karan who was evil all this time. He is sent away. Aakashi and Shyamad Das are overjoyed when they find out they are expecting a child. In the end, Bhavesh marries Anokhi and Smriti marries Jai who was her boss and both fell in love. Everyone surprises Purva and Mihir. The whole family celebrates the Godh bharai ceremony of Purva. The serial ends when Purva fix the name Revati to her newborn daughter.

== Cast ==
=== Main ===
- Aalesha Syed as Purva Shrastri Sanghvi – Revati and Sevanti's eldest daughter; Smriti, Akashi and Anokhi's sister; Vishal's cousin; Mihir's second wife; Jr. Revati's mother; Prem and Puchki's adoptive mother
- Shiju Kataria as Smriti Shastri Mehta – Revati and Sevanti's second daughter; Purva, Akashi and Anokhi's sister; Vishal's cousin; Mihir's ex-wife; Jay's second wife; Prem's mother; Nisha's step-mother
- Adaa Khan as Akashi Shastri Das – Revati and Sevanti's third daughter; Purva, Smriti and Anokhi's sister; Vishal's cousin; Shyamad's wife
- Ojaswi Oberoi as Anokhi Shastri Patel – Revati and Sevanti's youngest daughter; Purva, Smriti and Akashi's sister; Vishal's cousin; Bhavesh's wife

=== Recurring ===
- Sudeep Sahir as Mihir Sanghvi – Kamini's son; Sheetal and Shalaka's brother; Smriti's ex-husband; Poorva's husband; Prem and Jr. Revati's father; Puchki's adoptive father
- Unknown as Puchki Sanghvi – Purva and Mihir's adopted daughter; Prem and Jr. Revati's adopted sister
- Unknown as Jr. Revati Sanghvi – Purva and Mihir's daughter; Prem's half-sister; Puchki's adopted sister
- Unknown as Prem Sanghvi – Smriti and Mihir's son; Purva's adopted son; Jr. Revati's half-brother; Puchki's adopted brother
- Anand Suryavanshi / Akshay Anand as Jay Mehta – Samira's widower; Smriti's second husband; Nisha's father
- Ayesha Khan as Sheetal Sanghvi – Kamini's elder daughter; Mihir and Shalaka's sister
- Manoj Mishra as Shamad Das – Gomti's son; Aakashi's husband
- Dheeraj Dhoopar as Bhavesh Patel – Anokhi's husband
- Dolly Minhas as Kamini Sanghvi – Sheetal, Mihir and Shalaka's mother; Prem and Jr. Revati's grandmother; Puchki's adoptive grandmother
- Unknown as Shalaka Sanghvi – Kamini's younger daughter; Sheetal and Mihir's sister
- Gehana Vasisth as Gomti Das – Shyamad's mother
- Gaurav Nanda as Raman
- Ajay Chaudhary as Amar Malhotra – Purva's lover and ex-fiancé
- Nia Sharma as Nisha Mehta – Samira and Jay's daughter; Smriti's step-daughter
- Karan Veer Mehra as Karan Rajvansh – Smriti's pretend husband
- Shruti Ulfat as Revati Shastri – Sevanti's wife; Purva, Smriti, Akashi and Anokhi's mother; Prem and Jr. Revati's grandmother; Puchki's adoptive grandmother (Dead)
- Darshan Jariwala as Sevantilal Shastri – Neema's brother; Revati's husband; Purva, Smriti, Akashi and Anokhi's father; Prem and Jr. Revati's grandfather; Puchki's adoptive grandfather (Dead)
- Itishree Singh as Mansi Kapoor – Mihir's ex-fiancée
- Ketki Dave as Neema Shastri – Sevanti's sister; Vishal's mother
- Alok Arora as Kshitij Agarwal – Lalit and Harsha's son; Akashi's ex-fiancé
- Devrraj Singh Arora as Sameer Sharma – Anokhi's lover
- Unknown as Shyamad's brother
- Unknown as Shyamad's sister

== Reception ==
A week after its premiere The Indian Express stated, "There's definitely pace in the narration—things happen quickly and not too much time is wasted in unnecessary pans and zooms. The only exceptions are the establishing scenes for each of the four sisters." However they criticised the uniform unnatural streak of grey in the hair of the antagonist and questioned, "Why can't there be a single major female character who is attractive, wears glasses and is not bookish? Why do TV producers feel compelled to portray attractive young females as having perfect eyesight, teeth, hair and earlobes?"
