= Sayantani Ghosh =

Indian television actress (born 1983)

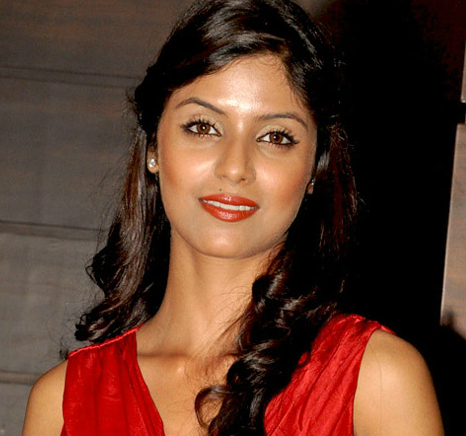
- Ghosh in 2014
- Born: 6 September 1983 (age 43); Kolkata, West Bengal, India
- Occupations: Model; TV actress; dancer
- Years active: 2005–present
- Spouse: Anugrah Tiwari (m. 2021)

Sayantani Ghosh (born 6 September 1983) is an Indian model, actress and dancer who primarily works in Hindi television alongside bengali movies. Ghosh went on to become one of the popular actress in hindi television after her role as lead in Naaginn – Waadon Ki Agniparikshaa. Later in 2012, she also participated in Bigg Boss 6.

== Early life and career ==
Sayantani Ghosh won the Miss Calcutta beauty pageant and found roles in Bengali films before obtaining her first television role in 2002, in the Indian soap opera Kumkum – Ek Pyara Sa Bandhan.

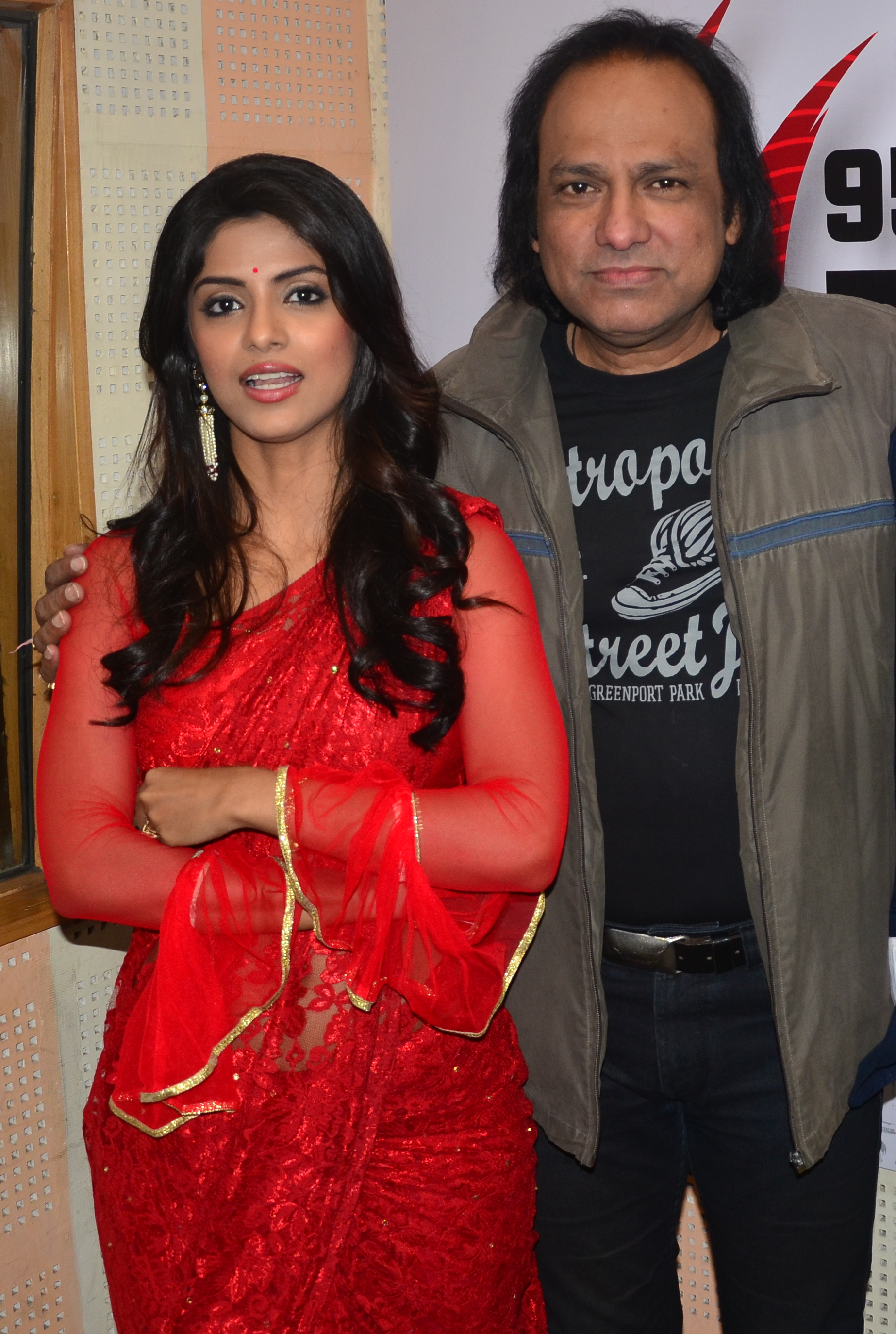
Sayantani Ghosh with Suresh Sharma promoting her 'Itna Karo Na Mujhe Pyaar'

After four years in that supporting role she joined the main cast of Naaginn – Waadon Ki Agniparikshaa as Amrita for two years. The Same year, she played the lead role of Kakul Samman Chaudhary in Ghar Ek Sapnaa. Followed by the guest role of Prosecutor Pranali Gujral on Adaalat. Ghosh participated in the sixth season of Bigg Boss 6, the Indian version of UK reality show Big Brother, and was evicted from the house in the third week.

In 2013 she appeared in the main cast of epic television series Mahabharat in the role of Satyavati, a fisher-woman who later became the emperor's wife. In 2014 Ghosh portrayed an antagonist in Itna Karo Na Mujhe Pyaar and became a contestant on Dare 2 Dance.

In 2015, Ghosh played the supporting role of Rajkumari Rajeshwari in Sasural Simar Ka. She then appeared in Rishton Ka Mela, Comedy Nights with Kapil and Comedy Classes. At the end of 2015 Ghosh was cast as lead antagonist Poulomi Maa in Santoshi Maa. In 2016 she joined the main cast of romantic drama Naamkarann, playing Neela Parikh until her character's death in February 2018.

In 2019, Ghosh made her theatre debut in a stage play called Ovee- A Haunted Hostel.. She then appeared in Sanjivani as Dr. Anjali Gupta

In 2020, she made a cameo appearance in Barrister Babu as Rasiya Bai.

In December 2020, she replaced Shweta Gulati's character Jhanvi Bansal in the Sony SAB series Tera Yaar Hoon Main and entered the show as Daljeet Bagga, the new female lead. Her character was shown to marry Rajeev (Sudeep Sahir), the male lead, under a certain situation. In 2021, she won the 'Favourite Lokpriya Sadasya' award from Gold Comedy Awards for her role as Daljeet Bagga in Tera Yaar Hoon Main.

== Personal life ==
Sayantani Ghosh married her long-time boyfriend Anugrah Tiwari on 6 December 2021.

In January 2022, Ghosh tested positive for COVID-19 along with her husband. She took a brief break from shooting and quarantined herself. After recovery, she resumed shooting for show.

== Filmography ==
| Year | Movie | Language | Notes |
|---|---|---|---|
| 2005 | Raju Uncle | Bengali | |
| 2005 | Nayak – The Real Hero | Bengali | |
| 2006 | Swapno | Bengali | |
| 2007 | Sangharsha | Bengali | Anjali |
| 2013 | Himmatwala | Hindi | Special appearance in song "Dhokha Dhokha" |
| 2024 | Sentimentaaal | Bengali | Rudrani Chowdhury |

== Television ==
| Year | Show | Role | Notes | Ref(s) |
|---|---|---|---|---|
| 2005 | Ekdin Pratidin | Doyel (later replaced by Sohini Sarkar) | | |
| 2006 | Kumkum – Ek Pyara Sa Bandhan | Advocate Antara Dhruv Wadhwa | | |
| 2007 | Comedy Circus | Contestant | Comedy show | |
| 2007 | Crime Patrol | | | |
| 2007–2008 | Ghar Ek Sapnaa | Kakul Samman Chaudhary | Lead Role | |
| 2007–2009 | Naaginn – Waadon Ki Agniparikshaa | Naagin/Amrita Arjun Singh | Lead Role | |
| 2008 | Ek Se Badhkar Ek | Contestant | Reality show | |
| 2008 | Comedy Circus 2 | Contestant | Comedy show | |
| 2008 | Banoo Main Teri Dulhann | Amrita Arjun Singh | Special appearance (Episode 581 & Episode 582) | |
| 2009 | Jhalak Dikhhla Jaa 3 | Herself / Guest | With Barkha Sengupta and Jasveer Kaur | |
| 2009 | Sabki Laadli Bebo | Herself | | |
| 2009 | Geet – Hui Sabse Parayi | Herself | Guest Appearance (Special) | |
| 2009 | Rakt Sambandh | Sakshi | | |
| 2010–2011 | Adaalat | Pranali Gujral | | |
| 2011–2012 | Meri Maa | Pratibha | | |
| 2012–2013 | Mrs. Kaushik Ki Paanch Bahuein | Naagin/Naina | | |
| 2012 | Bigg Boss 6 | Contestant | Evicted day 20 | |
| 2013 | Welcome - Baazi Mehmaan-Nawaazi Ki | Contestant | 4th Week (episode 19–24) | |
| 2013 | Mahabharat | Rajmata Satyavati | Recurring role (Episode 1-32) | |
| 2014 | Gustakh Dil | Aarohi Sagar Khurana | | |
| 2014 | Nach Baliye 6 | Herself | Guest (Celebrity reality dance show) | |
| 2014 | Dare 2 Dance | Contestant | Dance show | |
| 2014 | Bigg Boss 8 | Guest | Came for the task "Party Toh Banti Hai" | |
| 2014–2015 | Itna Karo Na Mujhe Pyar | Nivedita Basu | | |
| 2014–2015 | Singhasan Battisi | Mahamaya | | |
| 2014–2015 | Betal Aur Singhasan Battisi | Mahamaya | | |
| 2015 | Mela | Naagin/Naina | | |
| 2015 | Sasural Simar Ka | Rajkumari Rajeshwari | | |
| 2015 | Qubool Hai | Dancer | Special appearance | |
| 2015–2016 | Comedy Classes | Various characters | | |
| 2015–2016 | Comedy Nights with Kapil | Various characters | | |
| 2015–2016 | Santoshi Maa | Poulomi Maa (later replaced by Debina Bonnerjee) | | |
| 2016 | Box Cricket League 2 | Contestant | Player in Kolkata Babu Moshayes | |
| 2016–2018 | Naamkarann | Neela Parikh | | |
| 2018 | Jeet Gayi Toh Piya Morey | Female Werewolf | Guest appearance | |
| 2018 | Meri Hanikarak Biwi | Mrs. Neerja Srivastava | Cameo | |
| 2018 | Juzzbaatt – Sangeen Se Namkeen Tak | Herself / Guest | With Delnaaz Irani | |
| 2018 | Laal Ishq | Neighbour Bhabhi | (Episode 1) | |
| 2018 | Karn Sangini | Kunti | | |
| 2018 | Dastaan-E-Mohabbat Salim Anarkali | Nargis Jaan | Cameo | |
| 2019 | Vish Ya Amrit: Sitara | Mahamata | Cameo | |
| 2019–2020 | Sanjivani 2 | Dr. Anjali Gupta | | |
| 2019–2020 | Naagin 4 | Manyata Keshav Goradia | | |
| 2020 | Barrister Babu | Rasiya Bai | Extended cameo | |
| 2020 | Shandaar Ravivaar 2020 Reality | Guest (as Rasiya Bai) | | |
| 2020–2022 | Tera Yaar Hoon Main | Daljeet Bagga Bansal | Lead Role | |
| 2021 | Maddam Sir | Guest (as Daljeet Bagga) | The Big Shanivaar (Mahasangam Special) | |
| 2022–2023 | Ali Baba: Dastaan-E-Kabul | Simsim | Queen of the Forty Thieves and Owner of the Cave | |
| 2022 | Jai Hanuman – Sankatmochan Naam Tiharo | Devi Parvati | Shakti: Lord Shiva's consort | |
| 2024–2025 | Dahej Daasi | Vindhya Gaurawat | | |
| 2025 | Dahej Daasi | Sandhya Devi Thakur | | |
| 2025–present | Jagadhatri | Maya Deshmukh | | |
