= Abha Parmar =

Indian TV actress

- Born: Mumbai, Maharashtra, India
- Occupation: Actress
- Children: 2

Abha Parmar is an Indian actress. She is known for her role in the soap opera Iss Pyaar Ko Kya Naam Doon?, Neeli Chhatri Wale and Yeh Un Dinon Ki Baat Hai. and Parmar has contributed to Hindi dubbing for international animated features, voicing characters in Disney's The Lion King (1994) and Finding Nemo (2003).

== Television ==
Year	Show	Role
2025	Pati Brahmachari	Sarla
2022	Kabhi Kabhie Ittefaq Sey	Cameo as Neighbor in episode 1
2023	Dhruv Tara	Dadi
2021–2023	Meet: Badlegi Duniya Ki Reet	Mrs. Hooda "Dadi"
2021	Ishk Par Zor Nahi	Durga Devi Malhotra
2020	Gudiya Hamari Sabhi Pe Bhari	PutliBai
2018	Dil Se Dil Tak	Mrs. Khan
2017-2019	Yeh Un Dinon Ki Baat Hai	Beena Aggarwal (Taiji)
2017	Kya Hal, Mister Panchal	Balwanti
2017	Ek Tha Raja Ek Thi Rani	Seema Biswas
2016	Humko Tumse Ho Gaya Hai Pyaar Kya Karein	Gomti Dadi
2015	Tere Shahar Mein	Rumzum Gupta
2014	Neeli Chhatri Wale	Bua
2013	Punar Vivah - Ek Nayi Umeed	Dadi
2011–2012	Iss Pyaar Ko Kya Naam Doon?	Madhumati Gupta
2007–2009	Naaginn	Naagin's Bua
2005	Sabse Bada Rupaiya	Multiple Roles

== Films ==
Year	Movie	Role	Director
2018	Sui Dhaaga	Yogesh's Mother	Sharat Katariya
2013	Special 26	Minister's Wife	Neeraj Pandey
2006	Munna Pandey Berozgaar		Manish Jain
2005	Ramji Londonwale	Ramji's mother	Sanjay Dayma
1989	Main Azaad Hoon	Worker	Tinnu Anand
