= Gajala =

Indian actress

- Born: Gazala Shaikh Khan; Mumbai, India
- Occupation: Actress
- Years active: 2001–2011
- Spouse: Faisal Raza Khan (m. 2016)

Gajala (born Gazala Shaikh Khan) is an Indian former actress, who predominantly appeared in Telugu and Tamil languages films.

== Early and personal life ==
Gazala Shaikh Khan lived in Kuwait before her entry into the film industry. In 2010, she was reported to be in a romantic relationship with her costar Allari Naresh. She married Faisal Raza Khan in 2016.

== Career ==
Gajala once attempted suicide because of loneliness and depression. In an Interview with The Times of India, she said, "I don't see films as a career. Even when I started acting, I was doing films because I enjoy cinema. I never decided that I will do films till I'm 40 or 50 years old. I'm not struggling to work in cinema. If I get a good film, I'll be happy to do it. Otherwise, I'm not worried."

== Filmography ==
Year	Film	Role	Language	Other notes
2001	Nalo Vunna Prema	Raaji	Telugu	
2001	Student No: 1	Anjali	Telugu	
2002	O Chinnadana	Ramya Reddy	Telugu	
2002	Kalusukovalani	Anjali	Telugu	
2002	Adrustam	Keerthi Dhanraj	Telugu	
2002	Allari Ramudu	Rukmini	Telugu	
2002	Ezhumalai	Anjali Nagalingam	Tamil	
2002	Bharatasimha Reddy	Santhi	Telugu	
2002	University	Shanmati	Tamil	
2002	Thotti Gang	Karate Mallishwari	Telugu	
2003	Fools	Deepti	Telugu	
2003	Vijayam	Usha	Telugu	
2003	Janaki Weds Sriram	Janaki / Sita	Telugu	
2004	Malliswari	Monalisa	Telugu	Guest appearance
2004	Jore	Shalini	Tamil	
2005	Sravanamasam	Maha Lakshmi	Telugu	
2005	Raam	Karthikaayani Malaichamy	Tamil	
2005	Nuvvante Naakishtam	Radha	Telugu	Guest appearance
2005	Rakshasa		Kannada	
2006	Nee Venunda Chellam	Geetha Viswanathan	Tamil	
2006	Emtan Magan	Divya	Tamil	
2006	Madrasi	Meena	Tamil	
2007	Speed Track	Gouri	Malayalam	
2008	Raman Thediya Seethai	Thamizhisai Nedumaran	Tamil	
2008	Bhadradri	Paapa	Telugu	
2008	Durai	Meena	Tamil	
2010	Rambabu Gadi Pellam	Rambabu Gadi Pellam	Telugu	
2011	Money Money, More Money	Trisha / Tirupathamma	Telugu	
