= Ankush Arora =

Indian actor and singer

- Occupations: Actor; singer
- Years active: 2013–present

Ankush Arora is an Indian television actor popular for his portrayal of Kartik Barve in Zee TV's Yeh Vaada Raha.

== Career ==
Arora started off his television journey as he took on to portray Rishi Bhardwaj in Life OK's Gustakh Dil from 2013 to 2014. He then had an episodic role in Bindass's Yeh Hai Aashiqui as Sandeep Chautala.

His breakthrough role came when he portrayed Kartik and Krishna Barve in Zee TV's Yeh Vaada Raha from August 2015. His performance and chemistry with co-star Sonal Vengurlekar was appreciated; Arora was conferred with the Zee Rishtey Award for Favourite Beta. He quit in October 2016 not wanting to play father to a grown-up girl as the show underwent a 20-year-leap and was replaced by Krishna Soni.

In 2016, he was also seen in an episode of Channel V India's Gumrah 4. Two years later, Arora launched his own YouTube channel Video Coutures in March 2018.

== Television ==
| Year | Show | Role | Notes |
|---|---|---|---|
| 2013–14 | Gustakh Dil | Rishi Bhardwaj | Debut |
| 2014 | Yeh Hai Aashiqui | Sandeep Chautala | Episodic |
| 2015–16 | Yeh Vaada Raha | Kartik Barve/Krishna Barve | Lead/Double role |
| 2016 | Gumrah: End of Innocence | Unknown | Episodic |
