= Rishikaa Singh Chandel =

Indian actress

- Born: 1 September 1998 (age 28); Chhapra, Bihar, India
- Occupation: Actress
- Years active: 2017–present

Rishikaa Singh Chandel (born 1 September 1998) is an Indian actress who works primarily in Hindi television. She has appeared in television serials, digital productions and television commercials. She is known for her roles in the television series Vidya, Nayi Soch and Santoshi Maa, and the digital series LovePantii.

== Early life ==
Rishikaa Singh Chandel was born on 1 September 1995 in Chhapra, Bihar, India. She grew up in Chhapra and later moved to Mumbai to pursue a career in acting.

She completed her education in Chhapra and obtained a master's degree in Journalism and Mass Communication from Nalanda Open University in Patna.

== Career ==
Chandel began her television career with appearances in Hindi television productions. According to biographical profiles and media reports, her early television work included Collector Bahu, Dulari, CID, Savdhaan India, Crime Patrol and Bhabhi Ji Ghar Par Hain.

In 2019, she appeared in the television series Vidya in a supporting role.

In 2020, Chandel played the lead role of Damini in Nayi Soch, a television series broadcast on DD Kisan. The series focused on agriculture and rural development.

She subsequently appeared as Sita in the mythological television series Santoshi Maa, broadcast on &TV. Her performance and the role were reported by several Hindi-language publications.

In 2021, Chandel appeared in the digital series LovePantii, in which she played the character Sarita. The series was associated with MX Player, and her negative role was reported by Mayapuri.

Chandel has also appeared in television advertising campaigns. Media profiles have reported her association with advertisements for brands including Tata Capital, Snapdeal and Amazon.

In 2022, Filmibeat reported on Chandel's work as a content creator on Josh and described her television work and association with brand campaigns.

In August 2026, Chandel was announced as part of the principal cast of the Hindi film Public Kaa Hero, alongside Mimoh Chakraborty, Vishal Vishesh and Varsha Usgaonkar. The film's poster and teaser were launched in August 2026.

== Filmography ==
=== Films ===
Year	Title	Role	Notes
2026	Public Kaa Hero	Rishika	Upcoming film

=== Television ===
Year	Title	Role	Network
2019	Vidya	Sarita	Colors TV
2020	Nayi Soch	Damini	DD Kisan
2020	Santoshi Maa	Sita	&TV

=== Digital ===
Year	Title	Role	Platform
2021	LovePantii	Sarita	MX Player

== Awards and recognition ==
Chandel has received recognition for her work in television. In 2021, Hindi-language media reported that she was honoured with the Aadhi Aabadi Nari Ratna Award in Patna in connection with her portrayal of Sita in Jai Santoshi Maa.

Her earlier honours have also been reported by entertainment publications, including the Beauty of Bihar award and the Aadhi Aabadi Women Achievers Award.
