= Faisal Raza Khan =

Indian television actor

- Born: Patna, Bihar, India
- Occupations: Director, Actor, Photographer
- Years active: 2006 - present
- Spouse: Gajala (2016 - present)

Faisal Raza Khan is an Indian television actor, director, photographer. He is better known for his roles in the TV series Ssshhhh...Phir Koi Hai Season 3, Do Saheliyaan, Sapno Ke Bhanwar Mein and Gustakh Dil.

== Television ==
- Star One's Ssshhhh...Phir Koi Hai Season 3
- Zee TV's Do Saheliyaan
- Life OK's Sapno Ke Bhanwar Mein and Gustakh Dil
- Zee TV's Banoo main teri Dulhan
- DD National 's Yeh Hawayein
