= Tera Yaar Hoon Main =

2020 Indian TV series

- Genre: Entertainment
- Created by: Amit Aaryan
- Based on: Father-Son Relationship, Remarriage
- Written by: Amit Senchoudhary; Amit Aaryan; Shobhit Jaiswal; Rohit Malhotra
- Directed by: Pushkar Pandiit
- Starring: See below
- Opening theme: Tera Yaar Hoon Main
- Composer: Shashi-Sumeet
- Country of origin: India
- No. of seasons: 1
- No. of episodes: 378

Production
- Executive producer: Aayush Agrawal
- Producers: Shashi Mittal; Sumeet Hukamchand Mittal; Aayush Agrawal; Deependra Banerjee; Jitendra Singla
- Editor: Kshitija
- Camera setup: Multi-camera
- Running time: 24–30 minutes
- Production company: Shashi Sumeet Productions

Original release
- Network: Sony SAB
- Release: 31 August 2020 – 29 January 2022

Tera Yaar Hoon Main (transl. I am your friend) is an Indian Hindi-language comedy-drama television series, produced by Shashi Mittal and Sumeet Hukamchand Mittal under the banner Shashi Sumeet Productions, starring Sudeep Sahir, Sayantani Ghosh, and Ansh Sinha. It premiered on Sony SAB from 31 August 2020 to 29 January 2022.

== Plot ==
Rajeev Bansal, a bank manager in Jaipur, lives with his wife Jhanvi, their children Trishala and Rishabh, and his extended family. Although Rishabh shares a strained relationship with his father, Rajeev is determined to become his friend and eventually succeeds.

While speaking to Rajeev on the phone, Jhanvi causes a car accident while avoiding a pedestrian. She and the driver of another vehicle are killed.

=== 1 year later ===
Devastated by Jhanvi's death, Rajeev loses interest in life. Daljeet Bagga, a widowed Punjabi senior manager, joins his bank. The two initially dislike each other, but Rajeev learns that Daljeet's brother-in-law, Shakti, seeks custody of her children, Barry and Twinkle, who are the heirs to her late husband Ravinder's property. Rajeev is shocked to discover that Ravinder was the other victim in Jhanvi's accident. Driven by guilt and sympathy, he enters a contractual marriage with Daljeet to help her retain custody of her children.

Although Rajeev's family opposes the marriage at first, unaware of its contractual nature, Daljeet gradually earns their acceptance. Barry, initially hostile to Rajeev, turns against Shakti after learning his true intentions and eventually accepts Rajeev as his father. Trishala also accepts Daljeet after witnessing her genuine care. However, Rishabh resents Daljeet, believing she is replacing Jhanvi.

Daljeet falls in love with Rajeev and confesses her feelings, but he remains devoted to Jhanvi's memory. Shakti later exposes the marriage contract, shocking the family, though they remain supportive. After Daljeet wins another custody battle and Shakti's motives are revealed, the marriage is annulled. By then, Rajeev has unknowingly fallen in love with Daljeet. Rishabh's attempts to humiliate her fail, and her continued kindness eventually leads him to accept her as his mother.

Daljeet later learns that Jhanvi caused Ravinder's presumed death and feels betrayed by Rajeev's secrecy. Meanwhile, Barry and Rishabh overcome their rivalry and become friends. Seeking revenge, Shakti arranges an accident that nearly kills Daljeet and attempts to murder her in hospital. Terrified of losing her, Rajeev realizes he loves her. Daljeet forgives him, and they reconcile and marry despite further obstacles.

Barry later suffers a head injury during a fight with Rishabh and loses all memories of the previous year, including Rajeev and Daljeet's relationship. Rajeev temporarily distances himself from Rishabh but forgives him after seeing his remorse. Shakti returns and blackmails Daljeet, but Barry intervenes and drives him away.

Ravinder, believed dead, unexpectedly returns alive. Although he initially decides to leave for Daljeet's happiness, his identity is revealed. He restores Barry's lost memories, leaving Daljeet torn between Rajeev and Ravinder. Manipulated by Shakti, Ravinder briefly schemes to win her back, while Rajeev selflessly encourages Daljeet to choose him. Ultimately, Daljeet declares her love for Rajeev. Ravinder repents and apologizes. An enraged Shakti shoots at Rajeev, but Ravinder takes the bullet, kills Shakti, and dies after asking Rajeev to care for Daljeet.

=== 6 months later ===
Rajeev and Daljeet celebrate their first wedding anniversary. Rishabh, now a first-year student at the IIT, leaves to pursue his future. Rajeev drops him at the railway station not merely as a father, but as a trusted friend, concluding the series.

== Cast ==
=== Main ===
- Sudeep Sahir as Rajeev"Titu"Bansal: Pratap and Sushma's elder son; Reena and Rajan's brother; Jhanvi's widower; Daljeet's husband; Trishala and Rishab's father; Barry and Twinkle's step-father. (2020–2022)
- Ansh Sinha as Rishabh"Rishu"Bansal: Rajeev's and Jhanvi's son; Daljeet's step-son; Trishala's brother; Barry and Twinkle's step-brother and former rival; Swapnil and Varun's cousin; Gargi's boyfriend. (2020–2022)
- Sayantani Ghosh as Daljeet Bansal: Gurmeet's daughter; Ravinder's widow; Rajeev's wife; Barry and Twinkle's mother; Rishabh and Trishala's step-mother. (2020–2022)

=== Recurring ===
- Rajendra Chawla as Pratap Bansal: Sushma's husband; Reena, Rajeev and Rajan's father; Swapnil, Trishala, Rishabh and Varun's grandfather; Barry and Twinkle's step-grandfather (2020–2022)
- Jaya Ojha as Sushma Bansal: Pratap's wife; Reena, Rajeev and Rajan's mother; Swapnil, Trishala, Rishabh and Varun's grandmother; Barry and Twinkle's step-grandmother (2020–2022)
- Neeharika Roy as Trishala "Trishu" Bansal:Rajeev and Jhanvi's daughter; Daljeet's step-daughter; Rishabh's sister; Barry and Twinkle's step-sister; Swapnil and Varun's cousin; Laksh's ex-fiancée (2020–2022)
- Viraj Kapoor as Balwinder "Barry" Bagga:Daljeet and Ravinder's elder son; Rajeev's step-son; Twinkle's brother; Rishabh and Trishala's step-brother and former rival; Swapnil and Varun's step-cousin (2020–2022)
- Ekagra Dwivedi as Twinkle Bagga:Daljeet and Ravinder's younger son; Rajeev's step-son; Barry's brother; Trishala and Rishabh's step-brother; Swapnil and Varun's step-cousin (2020–2022)
- Ashu Sharma as Rajan "Nitu" Bansal:Pratap and Sushma's younger son; Reena and Rajeev's brother; Ruchi's husband; Varun's father (2020–2022)
- Vibhuti Patil Thakur as Ruchi Bansal:Rajan's wife; Varun's mother (2020–2022)
- Gautam Ahuja as Varun Bansal:Rajan and Ruchi's son; Swapnil, Trishala and Rishabh's cousin; Barry and Twinkle's step-cousin (2020–2022)
- Shweta Gulati as Jhanvi Jaiswal Bansal:Mamta's sister; Rajeev's first wife; Trishala and Rishabh's mother (2020)
- Manu Malik as Ravinder Bagga: Shakti's brother; Daljeet's first husband; Barry and Twinkle's father (2020)
  - Sarwar Ahuja replaced (Manu Malik) as Ravinder Bagga (2022)
- Mohit Daga as Shakti Bagga: Ravinder's brother; Mamta's obsessive lover; Rajeev and Daljeet's rival (2020–2022)
- Divya Bhatnagar as Reena "Tinki" Bansal Agarwal:Pratap and Sushma's daughter; Rajeev and Rajan's sister; Ashish's wife; Swapnil's mother (2020)
- Sukesh Anand as Ashish Kumar Agarwal:Reena's husband; Swapnil's father (2020)
- Meghan Jadhav as Swapnil Agarwal:Reena and Ashish's son; Trishala, Rishabh and Varun's cousin; Barry and Twinkle's step-cousin; Neelu's ex-fiancé (2020)
- Priyal Gor as Mamta Jaiswal: Jhanvi's sister; Rajeev's former unrequited lover (2021)
- Tasneem Khan as Gargi Rathore:Kunti and Sadanand's daughter; Rishabh's girlfriend; Barry and Varun's friend (2021–2022)
- Prakash Ramchandani as Sadanand "Sadu" Dungriyal:Principal of Oak Leaf College; Kunti's ex-husband; Gargi's father (2021–2022)
- Sushma Murudkar as Kunti Rathore:Gargi's mother; Sadanand's ex-wife (2021–2022)
- Manish Mishraa as Bajrang Mishra:A worker in Rajeev and Daljeet's bank (2020–2022)
- Sagar Parekh as Lakshya Roy:Shobha's son; Trishala's ex-fiancé (2021–2022)
- Vaishnavi MacDonald as Shobha Roy:Lakshya's mother (2021)
- Vibha Chibber as Gurmeet Kaur:Daljeet's mother; Barry and Twinkle's grandmother (2021-2022)
- Sailesh Gulabani as Rahul:Mamta's ex-fiancé (2021)
- Gaurav Kumar as Shashank:Trishala's best friend (2021)
- Guneet Sharma as Hudda:A Haryanvi senior student at Oak Leaf College (2021)
- Nitin Chauhaan as Jimmy:Daljeet's childhood friend (2021)
- Nishi Saxena as Princess Amy:Barry's former crush (2021)
- Ankita Sahu as Chandni Agarwal:Rakesh's younger daughter; Neelu's sister; Rishabh and Varun's crush; Chikoo (Johnny)'s real owner (2020)
- Ravi Gossain as Rakesh Kumar Agarwal:Neelu and Chandni's father (2020)
- Ashwini Tobe as Neelu Agarwal:Rakesh's elder daughter; Chandni's sister; Swapnil's ex-fiancée (2020)
- Trupti Mishra as Nirjhara Gupta:Rishabh and Varun's best friend who had a crush on Rishabh (2020)

== Production ==
=== Development ===
Set in Jaipur and filmed in Mumbai, the show is produced by Sumeet Mittal and Shashi Mittal under the banner Shashi Sumeet Productions.

The shooting of the show was indefinitely halted in April 2021 due to the COVID-19 Lockdown and the filming restrictions imposed in Maharashtra, and the remaining episodes were aired. After almost a fortnight, the production resumed with the show being filmed in Rajkot. The shooting restarted in Mumbai towards the end of June 2021.

=== Casting ===
Sudeep Sahir and Ansh Sinha were finalized to portray the male lead Rajeev Bansal and his son Rishabh respectively in the show.

Initially, Ami Trivedi was cast as Jhanvi Bansal, the female lead (Rajeev's wife). However, Trivedi opted out due to the COVID-19 pandemic and thus Shweta Gulati was approached cast to portray Jhanvi.

After the death of Gulati's character, Sayantani Ghosh was brought in to portray Daljeet Bagga, the new female lead.

=== Release ===
Sony SAB unveiled the show's first teaser in April 2020. On 25 July 2020, an official promo was unveiled which announced that the show would appear in August. Another promo was unveiled on 21 August 2020, announcing the release date.

The show went off-air on 29 January 2022 due to low TRP ratings, completing 378 episodes after a successful run of 2 years.

== Crossover ==
The Big Shanivaar is crossover of all Sony SAB's on-going shows (except Taarak Mehta Ka Ooltah Chashmah) on 9 October 2021 to promote Sony SAB telecasting their shows on Saturday also.

The Big Shanivaar is crossover of all Sony SAB's on-going shows (except Taarak Mehta Ka Ooltah Chashmah) on 20 November 2021 on the occasion of Diwali in Parakram SAF and to help its Cadet Koel Roy in escaping from her husband.

== See also ==
- List of programs broadcast by Sony SAB
- List of Hindi comedy shows
