= Soni Singh =

Indian television actress (born 1986)

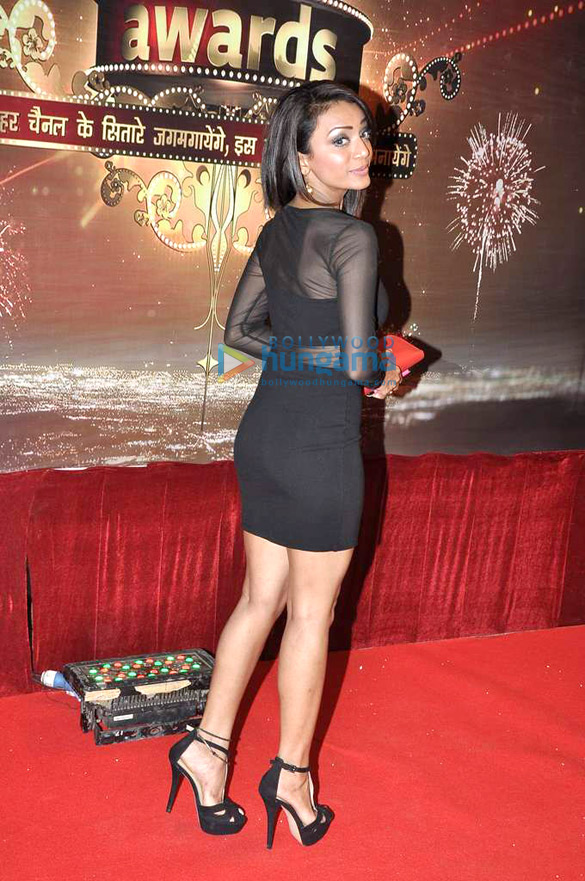
- Singh at the ITA awards in 2013
- Born: Mumbai, India
- Occupation: Actress
- Years active: 2004–present
- Known for: Bigg Boss 8, Naamkarann Saraswatichandra, Ghar Ki Lakshmi Betiyann

Soni Singh is an Indian television actress. She has appeared in the comedy show Comedy Nights with Kapil. She was one of the contestants on the reality show Bigg Boss 8 but was eliminated after 5 weeks. She also played one of the main leads in Ghar ki Lakshmi Betiyann.

== Career ==
Soni has appeared in several TV shows, including her notable work like Banoo Main Teri Dulhann, Ghar Ki Lakshmi Betiyann, Teen Bahuraniyaan, Jhansi Ki Rani and Mann Kee Awaaz Pratigya. She was also a contestant on Bigg Boss 8.

Soni Singh played the role of Menaka Shakti Singh in Mann Kee Awaaz Pratigya.

Soni Singh is also known for playing the Indian superheroine Shakira in the TV series Shakira: The End of Evil, telecast on the youth television channel Bindass in 2007. The action-packed show received a lukewarm response in India but was a hit on the American website Netflix.

In September 2014, Singh entered the reality TV show Bigg Boss in its eighth season. Soni spent 2 weeks in the plane crash area before entering the house. She spent 5 weeks in the house and was evicted on Day 35. During the show, she, along with Upen, was accused of sharing the same bed together.

== Television ==
Year	Serial	Role	Notes	Ref
2004–2008	Tumhari Disha	Rano		
2007	Four	Sue		
2007	Shakira – The End of Evil	Sakshi / Shakira		
2007–2009	Banoo Main Teri Dulhann	Surili		
2008–2009	Ghar Ki Lakshmi Betiyann	Jhanvi Goradia		
2008–2009	Teen Bahuraniyaan	Kajal		
2009–2010	Jhansi Ki Rani	Vishkanya		
2010	Aise Karo Naa Vidaa	Jyotika		
2010	Saath Nibhaana Saathiya	Karishma		
2011	Yeh Ishq Haaye	Mallika		
2011	Laagi Tujhse Lagan	Madhu		
2011–2012	Mann Kee Awaaz Pratigya	Menka		
2013–2014	Gustakh Dil	Anaya		
2013–2014	Comedy Nights with Kapil	Various characters		
2013–2014	Saraswatichandra	Kalika		
2014	Bigg Boss 8	Contestant	Evicted, Day 35	
2015	Killerr Karaoke Atka Toh Latkah	Contestant	Along with Roopal Tyagi & Kamya Panjabi	
2015	Sumit Sambhal Lega	Nagina		
2016	Sarojini - Ek Nayi Pehal	Sangeeta/Bijli		
2016	Box Cricket League 2	Contestant	Player for Chennai Swaggers	
2016	Yeh Hai Aashiqui	Episodic role	Along with Priyamvada Kant & Zaan Khan	
2016	Santoshi Maa	Swarnlekha		
2016	Yeh Vaada Raha	Kalandini		
2017	Aarambh: Kahaani Devsena Ki	Queen Syala		
2017	Shaurya Veer Eklavya Ki Gatha	Mastani		
2017–2018	Naamkarann	Sunheri		
2018–2019	Vish Ya Amrit: Sitara	Albeli		
2020	Aladdin – Naam Toh Suna Hoga	Zareena		
2021	Hero – Gayab Mode On	Kuntal Kamini		
2022	Dharm Yoddha Garud	Devi Diti		
2023–2024, 2025	Doree	Neelu	Season 1 & 2	
2025	Megha Barsenge	Sultana		

=== Special appearances ===
Year	Serial	Role
2024	Suhaagan: Ke Rang Jashn Ke Rang	Neelu
