= Woh Apna Sa =

Indian drama television series

- Genre: Drama
- Created by: Siddharth P Malhotra
- Written by: Raghuvir Shekhawat; Damini Joshi; Lakshmi Jai kumar Akash Deep
- Directed by: Rakesh Malhotra
- Creative director: Pritish Das
- Starring: Sudeep Sahir; Disha Parmar; Riddhi Dogra; Manasi Salvi; Kunal Karan Kapoor
- Country of origin: India
- Original language: Hindi
- No. of seasons: 1
- No. of episodes: 391

Production
- Producer: Rashmi Sharma
- Production locations: Mumbai, India
- Camera setup: Multi-camera
- Running time: Approx. 20 minutes
- Production company: Rashmi Sharma Telefilms Limited

Original release
- Network: Zee TV
- Release: 23 January 2017 – 20 July 2018

Woh Apna Sa (Translation: Like My Own) (English title: Kindred Hearts) is an Indian Hindi soap opera television series, produced by Rashmi Sharma Telefilms and distributed by Zee Entertainment Enterprises. It premiered 23 January 2017 on Zee TV. The show starred Sudeep Sahir, Disha Parmar, Riddhi Dogra, Manasi Salvi and Kunal Karan Kapoor. The show marked Parmar's second television series.

It replaced Yeh Vaada Raha. It went off air on 20 July 2018 with 391 episodes, and was replaced by Yeh Teri Galiyan.

== Plot ==
Aditya Jindal has a troubled marriage with his selfish wife, Nisha Jindal, but remains with her for the sake of their daughters, Chinni and Binni, as well as his family who think highly of Nisha. Later, Janvi Agarwal enters Aditya's life. As a deep bond develops between Janvi and Aditya, he turns to her for support, in ending his marital problems for good. Soon they expose Nisha's true colors and realize their feelings for each other. Aditya divorces Nisha. Janvi and Aditya get married. Chinni and Binni accept Janvi. However, Aditya and Janvi's happiness is short-lived as Nisha takes revenge by killing them near Kuldevi Temple.

=== 20 years later ===
Aditya and Janvi are reincarnated as Arjun and Jiya respectively. Jiya is a model who comes back to India and slowly regains her past life memories as Janvi. She develops a bond with Aditya's aunt, Sharada, and elder daughter, Chinni. Sharada and Chinni were thrown out of Aditya's house by Nisha, who has now married Samar Shukla. Soon, Arjun also regains his past life memories as Aditya. Arjun and Jiya save Aditya's father, Amrish, from Nisha. They both fight against Nisha and in the process, they fall in love. Nisha kills Samar. Nisha and Samar's son, Chirag returns and develops a bond with Sharada, Chinni, Arjun and Jiya. Chinni and Amrish are killed by Nisha. Nisha falls off a cliff and is presumed dead. Arjun and Jiya come to know that Aditya's younger daughter, Binni, is alive, but has grown into a rich spoilt brat. They bring back Binni, who refuses to accept them as her family after being manipulated by Nisha. Nisha is revealed to be alive and returns to destroy Arjun and Jiya.

Soon, Binni realizes the schemes of Nisha and gets her arrested, uniting with her family. She falls in love with Arjun's younger brother, Dr. Akash Sinha. Jiya-Arjun and Binni-Akash are arranged to marry on the same day. Unfortunately, Arjun and Akash's mother, Ambika, stops the marriage and reveals a woman, Rano, as Arjun's wife. Jiya feels Arjun has cheated on her and leaves him at the altar. Binni gets upset with Akash as he didn't reveal that he was Arjun's brother. Later, it's revealed that Arjun's marriage with Rano was incomplete as he had left her at the altar. Akash manages to persuade Binni. Ambika refuses to accept neither Jiya nor Binni cause of their western culture. Jiya discovers that Rano wants to seek revenge from Arjun's family and is just manipulating them. After several events, Jiya and Akash expose Rano who is thrown out. Arjun and Akash's father, Prakash, is saved from Rano. Ambika accepts both Jiya and Binni. Nisha escapes from prison and kills Arjun. Arjun's soul kills Nisha in an act of revenge. Binni and Akash are reunited while Jiya mourns for Arjun's death.

== Cast ==
=== Main ===
- Sudeep Sahir in a dual role as
  - Aditya "Adi" Jindal: Kalyani and Amrish's son; Rajan's cousin; Nisha's ex-husband; Janvi's husband; Chinni and Binni's father; Chirag's step-father (2017) (Dead)
  - Arjun Sinha: Reborn Aditya; Ambika and Prakash's elder son; Akash's brother; Jiya's love-interest; Rano's ex-fiancé (2017–2018) (Dead)
- Disha Parmar in a dual role as
  - Janvi Agarwal Jindal: Sahira's elder daughter; Surabhi's sister; Aditya's second wife; Chinni and Binni's step-mother (2017) (Dead)
  - Jiya Mehra: Reborn Janvi; Arjun's love-interest (2017–2018)
- Riddhi Dogra/ Manasi Salvi as Nisha Verma Shukla: Aditya's ex-wife; Chinni, Binni and Chirag's mother; Samar's widow; Janvi's rival (2017) / (2017–2018) (Dead)
- Kunal Karan Kapoor as Inspector Krishna Shekhawat; Jiya's one-sided-lover (2018)

=== Recurring ===
- Charvi Saraf as Chinni Jindal: Aditya and Nisha's elder daughter; Janvi and Samar's step-daughter; Binni's twin sister; Chirag's half-sister (2017–2018) (Dead)
  - Swasti Katyal as Child Chinni Jindal (2017)
- Tanya Sharma as Binni Jindal: Aditya and Nisha's younger daughter; Janvi and Samar's step-daughter; Chinni's twin sister; Chirag's half-sister; Akash's love-interest (2017–2018)
  - Elisha Jawrani as Child Binni Jindal (2017)
- Kinshuk Vaidya as Dr. Akash Sinha: Ambika and Prakash's younger son; Arjun's brother; Binni's love-interest (2018)
- Sara Khan as Rano Dey: Arjun's obsessive one-sided-lover (2018)
- Ashish Kapoor as Samar Shukla: Nisha's second husband; Chirag's father; Chinni and Binni's step-father (2017–2018) (Dead)
- Bhavya Sachdeva as Chirag Shukla: Nisha and Samar's son; Aditya's step-son; Chinni and Binni's half-brother (2017–2018)
- Alka Kaushal as Ambika Sinha: Prakash's wife; Arjun and Akash's moher (2018)
- Jeetendra Bhardwaj as Prakash Sinha: Ambika's husband; Arjun and Akash's father (2018)
- Priyamvada Sawant / Ushma Rathore as Sharada Jindal: Dharmesh's wife; Rajan's mother (2017–2018)
- Lata Sabharwal as Kalyani Jindal: Amrish's wife; Aditya's mother; Chinni and Binni's grandmother (2017)
- Vikram Sahu as Amrish Jindal: Dharmesh's brother; Kalyani's husband; Aditya's father; Chinni and Binni's grandfather (2017–2018) (Dead)
- Amit Behl as Dharmesh Jindal: Amrish's brother; Sharada's husband; Rajan's father (2017)
- Buneet Kapoor as Rajan "Raj" Jindal: Sharada and Dharmesh's son; Aditya's cousin; Neha's husband (2017)
- Vedika Bhandari as Neha Thakur Jindal: Rajan's wife (2017)
- Anandi Tripathi as Sahira Agarwal: Janvi and Surabhi's mother (2017)
- Sabina Jat as Surabhi Agarwal: Sahira's younger daughter; Janvi's sister (2017)
- Isha Anand Sharma as Dr. Priya Anand
- Ananya Khare as Sudha Mehat
- Reyhna Malhotra as Tamara Onkar
