= Divya Bhatnagar =

Indian actress (1986–2020)

- Born: 15 September 1986; Delhi, India
- Died: 7 December 2020 (aged 34); Mumbai, India
- Occupation: Actress
- Years active: 2009–2020
- Known for: Yeh Rishta Kya Kehlata Hai
- Spouse: Gagan Gabru (m. 2019)

Divya Bhatnagar (15 September 1986 – 7 December 2020) was an Indian television actress.

== Career ==
She appeared in serials like Yeh Rishta Kya Kehlata Hai, Sanskaar-Dharohar Apnon Ki, and Udaan, Sethji, and Tera Yaar Hoon Main.

== Death ==
Divya Bhatnagar was admitted to the hospital after her husband allegedly fled with her jewelry and cash. After Divya was shifted to another hospital because of worsening condition, she died.

Divya's husband had been harassing and physically assaulting her. Divya had previous filed an FIR against him, one of the many on his name, as it came to public knowledge, only after Divya's death.
