= Main Azaad Hoon =

- Film poster
- Directed by: Tinnu Anand
- Written by: Javed Akhtar
- Produced by: H. A. Nadiadwala
- Starring: Amitabh Bachchan; Shabana Azmi
- Music by: Amar Biswas; Utpal Biswas
- Distributed by: Nadiadwala Sons
- Release date: 15 December 1989
- Country: India
- Language: Hindi

Main Azaad Hoon (transl. I am Free) (Note: Also a reference to the title character, Azaad.) is a 1989 Indian Hindi-language vigilante action film adapted from the 1941 Frank Capra film, Meet John Doe, by Javed Akhtar, about an opportunistic journalist who concocts a fictitious man in a fictitious article to boost newspaper sales, but when the article gets a huge response, she finds an unemployed man to sit in as Azaad, "man of the masses". The film was directed by Tinnu Anand, and stars Amitabh Bachchan and Shabana Azmi.

The film has only one song; "Itne Baazu Itne Sar", written by Shabana Azmi's real life father and noted poet Kaifi Azmi and sung by the lead actor himself, Amitabh Bachchan.

The film won the Filmfare Award for Best Dialogue for Akhtar.

== Plot ==
Subhashini is a journalist working for a daily newspaper in a city named Rajnagar. She is deemed controversial due to her bold and open-mouthed articles against corrupt politicians.

After a change in the ownership of the newspaper, she realises that she stands to lose her job along with many others, especially who are not likely to subscribe to the new management's policies. Feeling betrayed, she vents her frustration by penning her column with a fictitious letter ad verbatim, which is supposedly written to her by someone named Azaad. This letter openly criticises the establishment and the chasm that exists between the haves and the have-nots, vocalising unacknowledged and uncomfortable facts. The letter also says that the author of the letter would commit suicide from a high-rise building on 26 January, the Republic Day of India, as a mark of protest against a failed system. The letter creates a sensation among political leaders, businessmen and the public.

In this new development, the new owner, Seth Gokulchand, senses an opportunity. He thinks of a scheme to promote his newspaper and coaxes Subhashini to establish a column in the name of Azaad and write about the ills of the present society and administration. The task for them now is to find a face and character for Azaad, should the question arise about the real identity of the author of the column and the letter.

One day, she comes across a jobless and nameless vaudevillian character, who happens to be drifting by Rajnagar along with another bum friend of his. Subhashini offers him a job asking him to pose as Azaad. He sees a chance in it to make a few quick bucks. With this in mind, and that he has nothing to lose, he accepts the job. Subhashini makes use of the whole propaganda machinery at her disposal to create a public figure for Azaad. Azaad is steadily introduced in the media and local issues and made to attend various public rallies. His native, down to the earth charm finds instantaneous appeal with the people of the town. This draws the gullible public to his frequent public addresses. Word spreads like wildfire and soon people from the surrounding rural areas flock in to attend his public appearances. This gathers momentum and soon Azaad becomes a cult figure. Gokulchand initiates the idea of making Azaad a much wider-publicised figure to Subhashini. She very efficiently works on the idea writing articles on Azaad, on Azaad's ideas. This results in Azaad becoming a kind of a nationwide hero, and is soon perceived as a threat by the local politicians as a potential national leader.

Later he learns through the media that he has been used; however he decides to sacrifice himself for the nation and prove that he now identifies with the ideology of the imaginary character Azaad. To prove that what had begun as fiction, has now become the truth, he jumps from the 30-storey under-construction building and dies. But before that, he records a message for his supporters and urges that Azaad should take birth in each one of them.

== Cast ==
- Amitabh Bachchan as Guru/Azaad
- Shabana Azmi as Subhashni Saigal
- Anupam Kher as Dalchand Jain
- Manohar Singh as Gokuldas
- Ajit Vachani as Editor Sharma
- K.K. Raina as Newspaper editor
- Ram Gopal Bajaj as Rambhau Kaka (Village Sarpanch)
- Raja Bundela as Anwar
- Avtar Gill as IG Nagu
- Annu Kapoor as Munna
- Anjan Srivastav as Rastogi - CM's PA
- Abha Parmar as Worker

== Music ==
The music was composed by Amar-Utpal.

Track name	Singers	Lyrics
"Itne Baazu"	Amitabh Bachchan	Kaifi Azmi
"Itne Baazu" v2	Amitabh Bachchan	Kaifi Azmi
"Itne Baazu" v3	Amitabh Bachchan	Kaifi Azmi
