= Gustakh Dil =

Indian television series

- Genre: Drama
- Created by: Ravi Ojha Productions
- Written by: Mitali Bhattacharya
- Directed by: Rakesh Kumar; Inder Das
- Starring: Sana Amin Sheikh; Vibhav Roy; Parvati Sehgal; Ankush Arora; Soni Singh; Meghna Malik; Rajiv Kumar; Shritama Mukherjee; Rumi Khan; Scott Adkins
- Opening theme: Gustakh dil
- Country of origin: India
- Original language: Hindi
- No. of seasons: 1
- No. of episodes: 334

Production
- Executive producers: Tapasya; Farheen Amber
- Producers: Mitali Bhattacharya; Ravi Ojha
- Editor: Janak Chauhan
- Running time: 24 Approx.
- Production company: Ravi Ojha Productions

Original release
- Network: Life OK
- Release: 5 August 2013 – 14 November 2014

Related
- Bou Kotha Kao

Gustakh Dil (transl. Audacious Heart) is an Indian television soap opera which premiered on 5 August 2013 and ended on 14 November 2014. It is a remake of the Bengali series Bou Kotha Kao, and was aired on Life OK during weekdays. It showed the stories of Laajo, Nikhil and Ishana.

Laajo is a simpleton from a village, and Nikhil is a cool guy who is madly in love with his childhood sweetheart, Ishana. Laajo becomes the second woman in Nikhil's life.

== Plot ==
Nikhil plans to celebrate his birthday in Sonbarsa where Nikhil's grandfather and aunt (bua) live. He plans to go with his childhood sweetheart Ishana but she refuses. There he meets a challenging but simple girl named Laajo who lives with her mother and sisters. Nikhil and Laajo clash playfully on several occasions. A number of circumstances lead Nikhil to unwillingly marry Laajo and bring her to the city with him.

Laajo struggles to fit in with Nikhil and his family, unaware of how things in a modern house work. Gradually, she tries to build an equation with him and his family.

Nikhil becomes annoyed with Laajo for not informing him about her trip to Sonbarsa. Kunal wishes to get engaged to Ishana. Nikhil reads Laajo's letter, becoming dejected on learning that Laajo has left him so he can reunite with Ishana. He visits Sonbarsa and after many attempts, wins Laajo's heart. The two are deeply in love while Barkha has sworn to never let Laajo return to her house. Laajo becomes a star with the help of Sagar and Anjali. She takes up the stage name of Trishna. At last Barkha accepts Laajo. Ayesha marries Adhiraj. The show ends on a happy note with Radha and LD coming to promote their show Mere Rang Mein Rangne Waali which replaced Gustakh Dil.

== Cast ==
- Sana Amin Sheikh as Laajwanti "Laajo" Bhardwaj / Trishna; Saraswati and Ram Bachan's elder daughter; Dhani's elder sister; Nikhil's wife; Sagar 's bestfriend
- Vibhav Roy as Nikhil Bhardwaj; Barkha and Inder's son; Ayeash and Gunja's brother; Laajwanti's husband; Ishana's boyfriend
- Parvati Sehgal as Ishana, Nikhil's girlfriend
- Shritama Mukherjee as Jasmine
- Soni Singh as Anaya
- Rumi Khan as Indrasena
- Meghna Malik as Barkha Bhardwaj, Nikhil's mother
- Indraneel Bhattacharya as Inder Bhardwaj, Nikhil's father
- Rajiv Kumar as Samrat, Nikhil's uncle
- Ankita Sharma as Nikhil's Maami
- Garima Vikrant Singh as Saraswati, Laajo's mother
- Sushil Bounthiyal as Ram Bachan, Laajo's father
- Siddhant Karnick as Sagar Khurana, Superstar and Laajo's mentor
- Shraddha Jaiswal as Ayesha Adhiraj Ranawat
- Jyoti Sharma as Gunja Bhardwaj
- Eva Ahuja as Anjali, Samrat's ex-wife
- Ankush Arora as Rishi, Samrat's son
- Leena Jumani as Ratri Sharma
- Scott Adkins as Bhattacharya
- Tanushree Kaushal / Anushka Singh as Aditi, Ishana's mother
- Sayantani Ghosh as Aarohi Sagar Khurana
- Sharhaan Singh as Siddharth
- Simmi Ghoshal as Neighbor
- Faisal Raza Khan as Kabir
- Chaitanya Choudhury
- Namrata Thapa
- Iqbal Azad
- Anita Kanwal as Nanima
- Shahrukh Sadri as Sagar's manager

== Adaptations ==
Language	Title	Original release	Network(s)	Last aired	Notes
Bengali	Bou Kotha Kao বৰ কথা কও	5 January 2009	Star Jalsha	14 January 2012	Original
Marathi	Man Udhan Varyache मन उधाण वाऱ्याचे	27 July 2009	Star Pravah	1 October 2011	Remake
Hindi	Gustakh Dil गुस्ताख दिल	5 August 2013	Life OK	4 November 2014	Remake
