= Leja Leja Re =

2006 song by Shreya Ghoshal and Ustad Sultan Khan

Song by Shreya Ghoshal, Ustad Sultan Khan

from the album Ustad & the Divas
- Language: Hindi
- Released: 2006
- Genre: Bollywood; Indi-pop
- Label: T-Series
- Composer: Sandesh Shandilya
- Lyricist: Irshad Kamil

"Leja Leja Re" is a Hindi song by Shreya Ghoshal and Ustad Sultan Khan from the album Ustad & the Divas.

It was rerecorded by Tanishk Bagchi and renamed Leja Re, and the new version was sung by Dhvani Bhanushali.

== Shreya Ghoshal version ==
Shreya Ghoshal initially was to sing two songs for Ustad Sultan Khan's album. However, due to time constraints, she had to let go of one and only recorded "Leja Leja Re". The video features models Nina Sarkar and Varun Toorkey

The song was featured on MTV Unplugged. It has been viewed more than 160 million times on YouTube as of 1 August 2026.

== Dhvani Bhanushali version ==
"Leja Re"

Single by Dhvani Bhanushali
- Language: Hindi; English
- Released: 23 November 2018
- Genre: Indian pop
- Length: 4:20
- Label: T-Series
- Composer: Tanishk Bagchi
- Lyricist: Rashmi Virag
- Producer: Bhushan Kumar

Dhvani Bhanushali singles chronology
"Leja Re" (2018)	"Main Teri Hoon" (2019)

Music video
- "Leja Re" on YouTube

The song was rerecorded in 2018 by Tanishk Bagchi and sung by Dhvani Bhanushali.

=== Music video ===
The music video was released on YouTube by T-Series and went viral, making Dhvani an established young singer in the music industry. As of August 2023, it has over 955 million views.

=== Reception ===
"Leja Re" has become widely popular in India with its presence in North Indian marriages.
