= Mahesh Pandey =

Indian TV and film script writer, director and producer (born 1979)

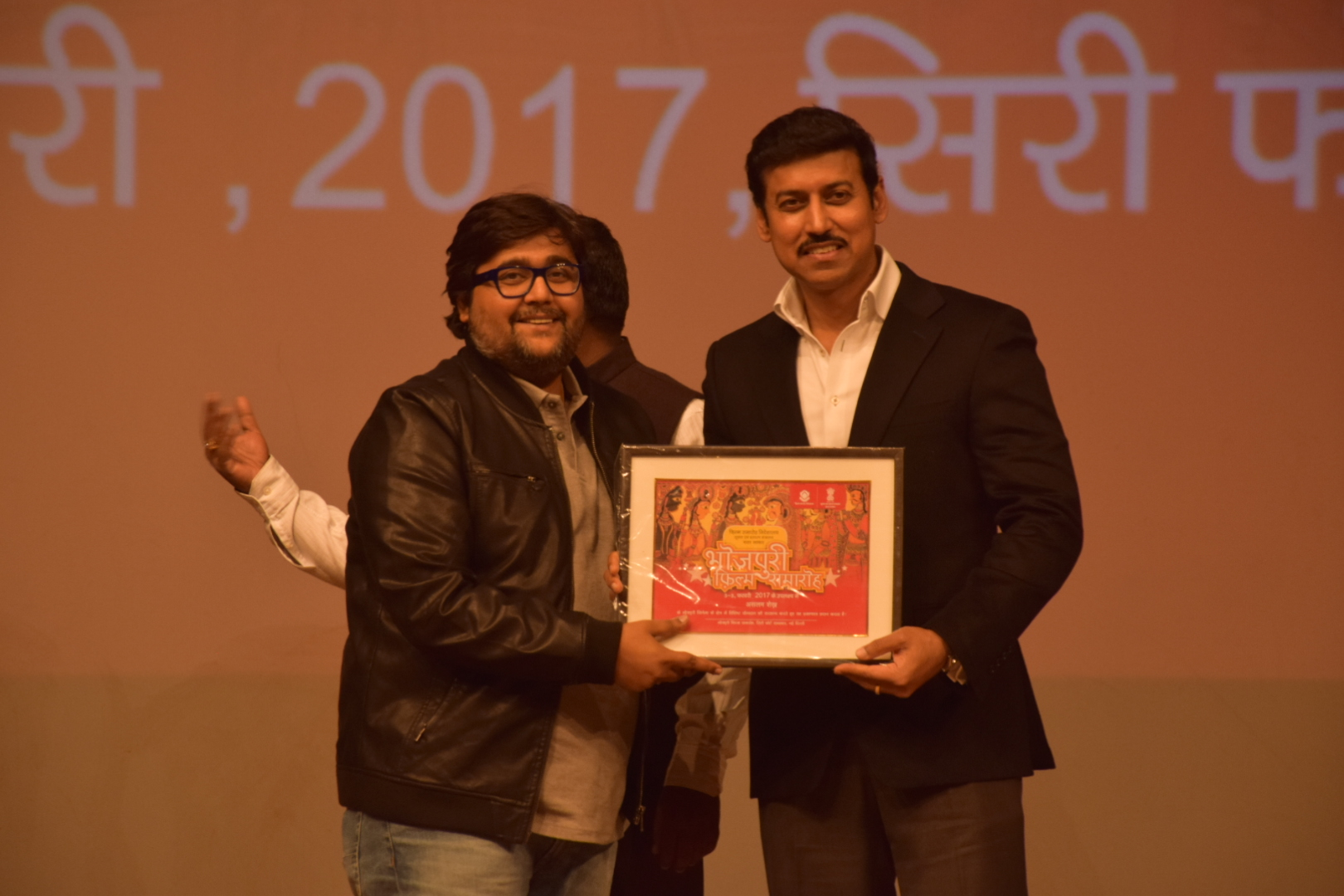
- Mahesh Pandey at BFM 2017
- Born: 5 April 1979 (age 47); Mumbai
- Occupations: Writer, Director, Producer
- Years active: 2000 - present
- Spouse: Madhu Pandey (m. 2011)
- Children: Bihaan Pandey
- Awards: Indian Telly Award

Mahesh Premchand Pandey (born 5 April 1979) is an Indian script writer, director and producer of television shows and films. He is known for writing Kasautii Zindagii Kay, Kasamh Se, and Vidya.

== Early life ==
Pandey is from Mumbai with roots in Uttar Pradesh. He gained high school education from Mumbai University.

== Career ==
Mahesh started his career from Kggk, followed by Kasuati, kutumb, kumkum-ek pyara sa bandhan, karam apna apna and many more daily soaps. He written his first Bollywood film Koi aap sa and directed a Bollywood thriller 332 Mumbai to India in 2010.

Mahesh has also worked in the Bhojpuri Film Industry from the films like Gabbar singh, Rani chali sasural, Sapoot.

Now he is a founder partner of Mahesh Pandey Productions LLP

== Personal life ==
Mahesh is married to Madhu Pandey.

== Awards ==
Year	Award	Category	Work
2004	Indian Telly Award	Best Scriptwriter	Kasautti Zindagi Kay
2015	Zee Rishtey Awards	Best Screenplay	Yeh Vaada Raha
2017	Ministry of Information and Broadcasting	Contribution	Entertainment Industry
2019	International Iconic Awards	Best Writer/Producer	Vidya
