= Santoshi Maa (TV series) =

Indian television series

- Genre: Mythology
- Created by: Rashmi Sharma
- Based on: Santoshi Mata
- Written by: Sharad Tripathi
- Directed by: Rashmi Sharma
- Creative director: Bhawna Bundela
- Starring: Gracy Singh; Ratan Rajput; Ayaz Ahmed; Debina Bonnerjee; Ahmad Harhash
- Country of origin: India
- Original language: Hindi
- No. of seasons: 1
- No. of episodes: 499 (list of episodes)

Production
- Producers: Rashmi Sharma; Pawan Kumar Marut
- Production locations: Mumbai, Maharashtra, India
- Camera setup: Multi-camera
- Running time: 22 Minutes
- Production company: Rashmi Sharma Telefilms

Original release
- Network: &TV
- Release: 30 November 2015 – 20 October 2017

Related
- Santoshi Maa - Sunayein Vrat Kathayein

Santoshi Maa, lit. 'Mother Santoshi', is an Indian television mythological series, which premiered on &TV from 30 November 2015 until 20 October 2017. The series is produced by Rashmi Sharma Telefilms. Gracy Singh plays the title role in the series, described as "an emblem of love, contentment, forgiveness, happiness and hope".

== Plot ==
The story unfolds in three parallel tracks, blending mythology with drama, and follows the life of Santoshi, a young girl whose fate is shaped by divine forces and human greed.

Track 1: As a child, Santoshi loses both her parents due to the interference of Goddess Poulomi, a deity who represents jealousy, greed, and deception. Orphaned, she is left to live with her cruel relatives, her selfish aunts and uncles, who are consumed by greed and luxury. Her cousins, equally wicked, make her life unbearable, treating her as a servant in her own home. Santoshi’s grandmother, who has love and affection for her, is unable to protect her due to her own children’s overbearing influence. She is isolated and deprived of education and enjoyment.

Track 2: Amidst her suffering, Santoshi remains a devoted follower of Goddess Santoshi, who she believes is the ultimate cure for all misery. Despite the hardships, she never loses hope and continues to worship the goddess, finding solace in her faith. Goddess Santoshi, alongside her divine ally Gau Mata, watches over her devoted follower, easing her worries as they can. But their efforts to help are often hindered by the schemes of Goddess Poulomi from "Devloka," the realm where all gods and goddesses reside. Since all deities must perform their duty to maintain balance in the universe, Goddess Poulomi and Goddess Santoshi constantly oppose each other, embodying the complementary forces of dissatisfaction and contentment.

Track 3: As she grows older, Santoshi’s perseverance pays off. Eventually, she marries a wealthy man, leaving behind the oppressive life with her relatives. She finally experiences the prosperity and happiness she always dreamed of, despite the many trials she faced in her youth.

== Cast ==
=== Main ===
- Gracy Singh as Santoshi Mata / Sadhvi Maa
- Ratan Rajput as Santoshi Dhairya Mishra (née Tripathi)
- Sayantani Ghosh / Debina Bonerjee as Poulomi Maa aka Trishna
- Ayaz Ahmed as Dhairya Raghavendra Mishra

=== Recurring ===
- Upasana Singh as Madhu Pratap Mishra (2015–2016)
- Parikshit Sahni as Raghavendra Mishra (2015–2017)
- Kiran Janjani as Ujjwal Mishra (2015–2016)
- Ahmad Harhash as Varun Mishra he is the son of Raghavendra (2015–2017)
- Omkar Das Manikpuri as Jagannath
- Sadhana Singh as Vidya Raghavendra Mishra
- Rahul Ranaa as Nagakaimasur
- Sonia Sahni as Dadi
- Sunita Rajwar as Daksha
- Rishikaa Singh Chandel as Sita
- K C Shankar as Sheshnath
- Harshita Shukla as Madhuri
- Vijay Badlani as Narada
- Shiju Kataria as Laxmi Mata
- Smriti Khanna as Parvati Mata
- Shahbaz Khan as Pratap Raghavendra Mishra
- Chandni Bhagwanani as Riya
- Abhishek Bajaj as Sanket
- Teejay Sidhu as Nupur Ujwal Mishra
- Piyali Munshi / Taraka Pednekar / Jheel Mehta as Saraswati Mata
- Kashvi Kothari as Child Santoshi
- Guddu Maruti as shashi kala
- Shabaaz Abdullah Badi as shashikala Nephew Rajan
- Meghan Jadhav as Shashikala Nephew chintu
- Shagun Pandey as Guddu
- Aishana Singh / Jyotsna Chandola as Bitto
- Priyamvada Kant as Sharmeeli (2016–2017)
- Kamalika Guha Thakurta as Kamini (2017)
- Harbandana Kaur as Rudrakshi Dhairya Mishra
- Kushank Arora as Ankur Pratap Mishra
- Archana Taide as Sindoori / Fake Santoshi (2016)
- Tarun Khanna as Shiva
- Soni Singh as Swarnarekha (2016)
- Aanchal Khurana as Bubbly Tiwari (2016)
- Aryan Vaid / Aarya Dharamchand Kumar as Indra (2016–2017) / (2017)
- Tasheen Shah as Poulomika (Trishna's daughter)
- Sammaera Jaiswal as Gau mata
- Alka Kaushal / Deepshikha Nagpal as Kranti Maa (2017) / (2017)
- Nasirr Khan as Kumbhak

=== Special appearance ===
- Juhi Parmar as Riddhima (Santoshi's Mother)
- Sachin Shroff as Vinayak (Santoshi's Father)

=== Guest appearance ===
- Sara Khan as Anju (2016)
- Ankit Gera as Nikhil (2016)
- Arti Singh
- Aditi Dev Sharma as Gangaa from (Gangaa) (2016)
