= Eva Shirali =

Indian television actress (born 1980)

- Born: Eva Shirali; 16 July 1980 (age 45); Mumbai, Maharashtra, India
- Occupation: Actress
- Years active: 2002–present

Eva Shirali (born 16 July 1980) is an Indian Hindi actress from Mumbai, best known for her roles in Gujarati and Hindi soap operas. She played the role of Garima in Divya Drishti and Gayatri Alok Sabharwal in Shaurya Aur Anokhi Ki Kahani on Star Plus. She is currently seen in Kismat Ki Lakiro Se.

== Television ==
Year	Show	Role	Notes
2005	Instant Khichdi	Priya	Episodic Role
2006	Kasamh Se		Cameo Role
2007	Sapna Babul Ka... Bidaai		
2009	Chhuta Chheda	Alka	
2010	Pavitra Rishta	Swati	Cameo Role
2010–2012	Hamari Devrani	Vrinda Mohan Nanavati	
2012–2013	Junoon – Aisi Nafrat Toh Kaisa Ishq	Komal	
2012	Ramleela – Ajay Devgn Ke Saath	Maharani Kaushalya	
2012; 2016	Savdhaan India	Multiple characters	Separate episodics
2013	Gustakh Dil	Anjali	
2013	Khelti Hai Zindagi Aankh Micholi	Nisha	
2014	Yam Kisi Se Kam Nahin	Mandira	
2017–2018	Saam Daam Dand Bhed	Sadhana Namdhari	
2019	Divya Drishti	Garima	
2019–2020	Tara From Satara	Sarita Sachin Mane	
2020–2021	Shaurya Aur Anokhi Ki Kahani	Gayatri Alok Sabharwal	
2021–2022	Sirf Tum	Sudha Rakesh Sharma	
2022–2024	Kismat Ki Lakiro Se	Naina Dilip Tripathi	
2024–2025	Apollena – Sapno Ki Unchi Udann	Madhu Shukla	
2025	Ishq Jabariya	Mrs. Tiwari	
2025–present	Mann Atisundar	Rajani Mittal	
