= Shiju Kataria =

Indian actress

- Born: 27 May; Fazilka, Punjab, India
- Occupations: Actress, Producer
- Years active: 2002-present
- Spouse: Jay Patel (m.2018-present)
- Parents: Naresh Kataria (father); Kavita Kataria (mother)
- Website: shijukataria.weebly.com

Shiju Kataria (born 27 May) is an Indian television actress and producer known for portraying Smriti in StarPlus's Behenein. As of August 2021, she is portraying Sejal Anjaaria in Colors TV's Balika Vadhu 2.

== Early life and career ==
Shiju Kataria was born on 27 May to Naresh Kataria and Kavita Kataria in Fazilka, Punjab. She completed her schooling from Army Public School, Fazilka. She shifted to Chandigarh for higher studies. Shiju graduated from Punjab University (Chandigarh). In 2002, she shifted to Mumbai to pursue her career in acting. She is best known for her role in StarPlus' serial Behenein. Her hard-work was recognized by Gulzar Sahib who chose her as a lead in two movies. She played lead role in the movie Teen Behne. She also starred in the movie Das Tola.

Shiju has starred in almost 70 serials. From 2014 to 2017, she appeared in Behenein on star plus, Pyaar Tune Kya Kiya (TV series), Santoshi Maa (TV series), Aahat, Savdhaan India, Mohi- Ek Khwab Ke Khilne Ki Kahani, Angrezi mein kehte hain (ndtv imagine), crime patrol, cid, savdhaan india, kashmkash zindgi ki etc.

== Television ==
Year	Show	Role
2003	Talaq Kyun	
2004	Nirmala	Krishna
2004	Shakti	
2004	Godaan	Rupa
2006 - 2018	Crime Patrol	
2006 - 2008	Kashmakash Zindagi Ki	Purva
2008 - 2009	Angrezi Mein Kehte Hain	Chaya Arora
2010 - 2011	Behenein	Smriti / Aastha
2012 - 2018	Savdhaan India	
2014 - 2017	Pyaar Tune Kya Kiya	Shivani
2015	Fear Files: Darr Ki Sacchi Tasvirein	
2015	Aahat	
2015 - 2017	Santoshi Maa	Laxmi Mata
2021	Balika Vadhu 2	Sejal Anjaaria

== Films ==
Year	Film	Director	Character
2010	Das Tola	Ajoy Verma	Anju
2018	Ani Maane	Jay Gb Patel	Ani Maane
2020	It's My Life	Anees Bazmee	Chutki (Nana Patekar's Younger Daughter)
