= Varun Toorkey =

Indian television actor

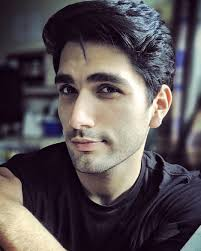
- Toorkey in 2016
- Born: 8 January 1990 (age 36); Bombay, Maharashtra, India
- Citizenship: Indian
- Occupations: Actor, Model (formerly)
- Years active: 2006–2021

Varun Toorkey is a former Indian television actor known for portraying Shaad Khan in Qubool Hai and Tushar Mallick in Humko Tumse Ho Gaya Hai Pyaar Kya Karein.

== Career ==
Toorkey was just 16 years of age when he got his first break into the industry, in a compilation album called Ustad and the divas. In that album, he acted as a computer professional in the song Leja Leja Re which was sung by Shreya Ghoshal and Ustad Sultan Khan. The album released in 2006.

He made his television debut in 2013, playing Sankrant in Colors TV's Uttaran.

In 2015, he played Shaad Aftaab Khan in Zee TV's Qubool Hai opposite Surbhi Jyoti.

In 2016, Toorkey played Tushar Malik in Humko Tumse Ho Gaya Hai Pyaar Kya Karein opposite Ishani Sharma.

From 2017 to 2018, he portrayed Anant Singh Baghel in Saam Daam Dand Bhed.

In 2019, he played Rishabh in Yeh Rishta Kya Kehlata Hai opposite Shivangi Joshi. Since July 2021, Toorkey is playing Kunal Malhotra in Choti Sarrdaarni opposite Nimrit Kaur Ahluwalia and Mahir Pandhi till October 2021.

In 2023, he quit acting to pursue a career in the Culinary Arts industry.

== Filmography ==
=== Television ===
Year	Serial	Role	Ref
2013–2015	Uttaran	Sankrant Chatterjee	
2015	Qubool Hai	Shaad Aftab Khan	
2016	Humko Tumse Ho Gaya Hai Pyaar Kya Karein	Tushar Mallick	
2017–2018	Saam Daam Dand Bhed	Anant Singh Baghel	
2019	Yeh Rishta Kya Kehlata Hai	Rishabh	
2021	Choti Sarrdaarni	Kunal Malhotra	

=== Music video appearances ===
Year	Album	Song	Reference
2006	Ustad and the Divas	Leja Leja Re	
