= Sumit Bhardwaj =

Indian actor

- Occupation: Actor
- Years active: 2014–present
- Known for: Shastri Sisters; Nazar

Sumit Bhardwaj is an Indian actor who appears in television shows. He is best known for appearing as Neil Sareen in his debut series Shastri Sisters on Colors TV. His other shows include Beyhadh, Ayushman Bhava and Qayamat Ki Raat. Currently he is playing the role of Samar Pratap in Sasural Simar Ka 2.

== Television ==
Year	Title	Role	Notes	Ref.
2014–2015	Shastri Sisters	Neil Surinder Sareen		
2016	Silsila Pyaar Ka	Prateek	Recurring role	
2016–2017	Beyhadh	Ayaan Sharma	Recurring role	
2017	Ayushman Bhava	Krish Madhav Mehra/Krishna		
2018	Qayamat Ki Raat	Dharam Lakha Choudhary	Recurring role	
2019	Nazar	Mayank/Asuransh	Recurring role	
2021–2022	Sasural Simar Ka 2	Samar Khanna		
2021	Sirf Tum	Samar Khanna	Guest	
2026	Jhanak	Dr. Ayushman	Recurring role	
