= Saam Daam Dand Bhed (TV series) =

Indian television series

- Created by: Shyamasis Bhattacharya
- Written by: Shyamasis Bhattacharya
- Directed by: Hemant Prabhu
- Country of origin: India
- Original language: Hindi
- No. of episodes: 328

Production
- Producer: Shyamasis Bhattacharya
- Production location: Mumbai
- Camera setup: Multi-Camera
- Running time: 22 minutes
- Production company: Shakuntalam Telefilms

Original release
- Network: Star Bharat
- Release: 28 August 2017 – 29 September 2018

Saam Daam Dand Bhed is an Indian political drama television series that aired on Star Bharat. Produced by Shakuntalam Telefilms, the show premiered on 28 August 2017.

== Plot ==
The story revolves around Vijay Namdhari and his political journey, where the lust for power tests the bonds of love, family and friendship.

== Cast ==
=== Main ===
- Bhanu Uday as Vijay Namdhari, Anant's best friend, Bulbul's husband and Mandira's love interest
- Varun Toorkey as Anant Singh Baghel, Vijay's best friend, Mandira's husband and King of Kaushalpur
- Sonal Vengurlekar as Mandira Singh Rajput, CM's daughter, Anant's wife
- Aishwarya Khare as Bulbul Namdhari, Vijay's wife and love interest

=== Recurring ===
- Perneet Chauhan as Tejaswini Singh Baghel, Anant's elder sister
- Gireesh Sahedev as Pankaj Chaudhary, Vijay's rival, CM's cousin and Mandira's uncle
- Shashank Vatsya as Rambodh
- Aishwarya Raj Bhakuni as Ragini, as Pankaj Chaudhary's kidnapee
- Aalok Kapoor as Raghavji, a manipulator politician
- Pradeep Shukla as Raguvansh Singh Rajput, aka Baba (Chief Minister aka CM)
- Akshay Anand as Prabhat Namdhari, Vijay's elder brother
- Eva Ahuja as Sadhna Namdhari, Prabhat's wife
- Aakarshan Singh as Agastya Namdhari, Vijay's younger brother
- Niel Satpuda as Angad Namdhari, Vijay's Nephew, Prabhat and Sadhna's son
- Afia Tayebali as Vasundra Namdhari, Vijay's Niece, Prabhat and Sadhna's daughter
- Adish Vaidya/Devesh Sharma as Yug, Vasu's husband
- Abhishek Singh Rajput as Girl's hostel guy
