= Parveen Kaur (Indian actress) =

Indian actress

- Born: Mumbai
- Occupation: Acting
- Years active: 2014-present

Parveen Kaur is an Indian actress born in Mumbai who graduated from Sathaye College.

Kaur has been part of shows including: Ishq Unplugged, Chakravartin Ashoka Samrat, Humko Tumse Ho Gaya Hai Pyaar Kya Karein, Yeh Hai Mohabbatein, Kasam Tere Pyaar Ki, Balika Vadhu and many more. Kaur has also appeared in several films and TV commercials including: Amazon’s Apni Dukan, Franklin Templeton, Rajdhani Daal, Kurkure, and Reliance Free.

== Filmography ==
=== Television ===
Year	Title	Role
2014	Satrangi Sasural	Diya's Mother
2014	Kumkum Bhagya	Wife of Abhishek's colleague
2015	Yeh Hai Mohabbatein	Dr. Aditi
2015	Humko Tumse Ho Gaya Hai Pyaar Kya Karein	Rajni
2015	Chakravartin Ashoka Samrat	Kasturi
2015	Taarak Mehta Ka Ooltah Chashmah	Nalini's mother
2015	Balika Vadhu	Teacher
2016	Meri Aashiqui Tum Se Hi	Shikhar's aunty
2016	Mastaangi - One Love Story Two Lifetimes	Psychologist
2016	Kasam Tere Pyaar Ki	Savitri Malhotra
2016	Kavach... Kaali Shaktiyon Se	Vishaal's mother
2016	Pardes Mein Hai Mera Dil	Amit's mother
2016	Pyaar Tune Kya Kiya	Harpreet
2016	Ishq Unplugged	Sweety
2016	CID	Various
2016	Crime Patrol	Various
2016	Savdhaan India	Various
2017	TV, Biwi aur Main	Kushal's mother
2017	Kundali Bhagya	Mrs. Ahuja
2018–2019	Ladies Special	Rachana Kashyap

=== Films ===
Year	Title	Role
2015	Chinar Daastaan-E-Ishq	Aziz Cinema Khan's Wife
2016	Airlift	Ashok's Wife/Amirta Katyal's friend
2016	Fan	Train passenger
2016	Bhabhipedia	Bhabi
