= Humko Tumse Ho Gaya Hai Pyaar Kya Karein? =

- Genre: Drama
- Created by: Suzana Ghai
- Written by: Manasvi Arya
- Starring: Ishani Sharma; Varun Toorkey; Sudhir Pandey; Abha Parmar; Ankur Verma
- Opening theme: Darshan Raval & Palak Muchhal
- Country of origin: India
- Original language: Hindi
- No. of seasons: 1
- No. of episodes: 95

Production
- Producers: Suzana Ghai; Hemant Ruprell; Ranjeet Thakur
- Production location: Delhi
- Cinematography: Sameer Shrivastava
- Editor: Sameer Gandhi
- Camera setup: Multi-camera
- Running time: 22 minutes approx.
- Production company: Panorama Entertainment

Original release
- Network: StarPlus
- Release: 6 June – 7 October 2016

Humko Tumse Ho Gaya Hai Pyaar Kya Karein? (English: I've Fallen In Love With You, What To Do?) is an Indian Hindi drama television series, which used to air on StarPlus. Produced by Suzana Ghai's Panorama Entertainment, the show starred Ishani Sharma and Varun Toorkey.

It showed how true love can change people for the better and when you love someone, only that person matters, and not his wealth or status. The show premiered on 6 June 2016 and ended abruptly after 4-month run in October 2016 due to very low viewership.

== Plot ==
Anokhi Mehra is a clever, witty girl who hails from a middle-class family in Chandni Chowk, Delhi. Anokhi dreams of marrying a rich guy and believes that money is the main source of happiness. Her life takes a turn when she gets a job as an accountant in the Mallick house, where lives the wealthy and dysfunctional Mallick family. There she meets the family's soft-spoken heir, Tushar Mallick who falls for her, while she falls for his wealth. The show follows how Anokhi manages to win the Mallick family's hearts with her wit and charm while falling in love with Tushar, thus learning the true meaning of love and marriage. It is later revealed that Tushar's mother Nikita Mallika is not his mother. Nikita hates Tushar but she doesn't show that she hates him. It is then revealed that their house servant who is working there is his biological mother actually she was the daughter in law of the house. This news is given to Tushar by Anokhi. The show ends with him knowing that their servant is his mother and the reason for her becoming the servant of the house and thus Anokhi and Tushar reunites by love.

== Cast ==
- Ishani Sharma as Anokhi Mehra, Tushar's wife, Gautam and Shashi's sister, Tilak and Vrinda's daughter
- Varun Toorkey as Tushar Mallick, Anokhi's husband, Pulkit's brother, Prithvi and Kalpana's son
- Avinash Sahijwani as Tilak Mehra, Vrinda's husband, Gautam, Anokhi and Shashi's father
- Deepti Sharma as Vrinda Mehra, Tilak's wife, Gautam, Anokhi and Shashi's mother
- Rahul Ram Manchanda as Gautam Mehra, Priyanka's husband, Tilak and Vrinda's son, Anokhi and Shashi's brother
- Swati Jain Shah as Priyanka Mehra, Gautam's wife
- Akhalaque Khan as Shashi Mehra, Tilak and Vrinda's son, Gautam and Anokhi's brother
- Pratima Kazmi as Dharamveer's elder sister
- Sudhir Pandey as Dharamveer Mallick, Gomti's husband, Parikshit and Prithvi's father, Pulkit, Jassi, Anokhi and Tushar's grandfather
- Abha Parmar as Gomti Mallick, Dharamveer's wife, Parikshit and Prithvi's mother, Pulkit, Jassi, Anokhi and Tushar's grandmother.
- Unknown as Parikshit Mallick, Nikita's husband, Pulkit's father, Anokhi and Tushar's uncle, Prithvi's brother, Dharamveer and Gomti's son
- Sujata Sanghamitra as Nikita Mallick, Parikshit's wife, Pulkit's mother, Jassi's mother-in-law, Tushar and Anokhi's aunt
- Vishal Malhotra as Pulkit Mallick, Jassi's husband, Tushar's brother, Parikshit and Nikita's son
- Sheetal Dabholkar as Jassi Mehra, Pulkit's wife, Tushar and Anokhi's sister-in-law and Parikshit and Nikita's daughter-in-law.
- Saptarishi Ghosh as Prithvi Mallick, Kalpana's husband, Tushar's Father, Anokhi's father-in-law and Dharamveer and Gomti's youngest son.
- Unknown as Kalpana Mallick, Prithvi's wife, Tushar's mother, Anokhi's mother-in-law and Dharamveer and Gomti's youngest daughter-in-law.
- Ankur Verma as Kunal Chaddha, Manager of Mallicks Company.
- Parveen Kaur as Rajni helped Kalpana in the marriage of Tushar and Anokhi.
