= Vidya (TV series) =

- Created by: Mahesh Pandey
- Developed by: Mahesh Pandey
- Creative directors: Chhaya Chauhan; Atul Kumar Sharma (Creative Head)
- Starring: See below
- Country of origin: India
- Original language: Hindi
- No. of seasons: 1
- No. of episodes: 163

Production
- Producers: Mahesh Pandey; Madhu Pandey
- Running time: 21 minutes
- Production company: Mahesh Pandey Productions LLP

Original release
- Network: Colors TV
- Release: 9 September 2019 – 30 March 2020

Vidya (transl. Education) is an Indian social drama television series that has been broadcast since 9 September 2019 on Colors TV. Produced by Mahesh Pandey it stars Namish Taneja and Meera Deosthale.

The show was taken off the air abruptly due to the COVID-19 pandemic lockdown in India on 30 March 2020. Later, it was announced that the show will not be brought back after the lockdown bringing the show to an abrupt ending.

== Premise ==
Vidya is a quaint and superstitious widow who awaits a letter from the government regarding her job. However, her luck takes a turn for the worse when she gets the job of teaching English at a school. But unknown to the world she is an illiterate. IAS Vivek Vardhaan Singh, a righteous officer, takes over the charge of the city as the new District Magistrate. He respects Vidya a lot and gradually starts falling in love with her despite her being a widow. Then there is a corrupt politician Nanku Singh creating hurdles in the ways of both of them in many tasks of development. When Vidya reveals she is illiterate Vivek is furious and hurt. By then even she had fallen in love with him and tries to explain her situation and the whole story to him how she was married off and on the very day of her wedding her husband an army officer was called for the duty and got martyred. So to support her in laws she was forced to take up the job. Vivek accepts Vidya and promises to teach her. Vivek's mother lays a condition of accepting Vidya only if she becomes a teacher in reality with all the necessary qualifications. Here begins the journey of Vidya of completing her education.

== Cast ==
=== Main ===
- Meera Deosthale as Teacher Vidya Singh — A government school teacher; Ramesh and Durga's daughter; Mohan's sister; Vivek's wife; Nanku's enemy (2019–2020)
  - Ayat Shaikh as young Vidya (2019)
- Namish Taneja as IAS Vivek Vardhaan Singh — Vardhan and Mamta's son; Mahek's and Ansh's adoptive brother; Vidya's husband; Nanku's enemy (2019–2020)

=== Recurring ===
- Aaloak Kapoor as Ramesh Singh — Durga's husband; Vidya and Mohan's father (2019)
- Sanya Dutt as Durga Singh — Ramesh's wife; Vidya and Mohan's mother (2019)
- Sudhanshu Sharan as Mohan Singh — Ramesh and Durga's son; Vidya's brother; Keerti's husband (2019)
- Rasika Singh as Keerti Singh — Mohan's wife (2019)
- Geeta Tyagi as Mamta Singh — Vardhan's wife; Ansh's and Vivek's mother; Mahek's adoptive mother (2019)
- Vikrant Singh Rajpoot as Politician Avtaar Singh — Mehak's love interest (2019–2020)
- Mansi Srivastava as Mehak Singh — Vardhan and Mamta's adoptive daughter; Ansh’s and Vivek's adoptive sister; Avtaar's love interest (2020)
- Vaquar Shaikh as Politician Nanku Singh — Parvati's son; Ranjana's brother; Kalindi's husband; Pari's father; Vidya's admirer turned enemy; Vivek's enemy; DM Sharma's murderer (2019–2020)
- Anshu Shrivastav as Kalindi Singh – Nanku's wife; Jagat's sister; Pari's mother (2019–2020)
- Anamika Kadamb as Ranjana Thakur – Nanku's sister; Parvati's daughter; Prem Pratap's admirer turned enemy (2019–2020) (Jailed)
- Sanjay Pandey as Dharam Singh – Parbatiya's husband; Ram and Bablu's father; Nanku's slave; a greedy man (2019–2020)
- Uma Basu as Parbatiya Devi – Dharam's wife; Ram and Bablu's mother (2019–2020)
- Manmohan Tiwari as Ram Singh – An army officer; Parbatiya and Dharam's son; Vidya's former husband (2019) (Cameo)
- Akash Mukherjee as Bablu Singh – Parbhatiya and Dharam's son; Ram's brother; Nanku's slave; a greedy boy (2019–2020)
- Garima Gupta as Principal Monali Verma (2019–2020)
- Jeetendra Trehan as DM Sharma (2019) (Dead)
- Zarina Roshan Khan as Parvati Singh – Nanku and Ranjana's mother; Pari's grandmother (2019) (Dead)
- Mohit Sharma as Anand – Vivek's assistant (2019–2020)
- Rishikaa Singh Chandel as Sarita
- Lilliput as School Principal Manohar Mishra (2019–2020)
- Swadesh Mishra as Jagat; Kalindi's brother; Parvati's murderer (2019–2020)
- Mohit Abrol as Sandeep; Vidya's ex fiancee; Nanaku's goon turned enemy
- Ahmad Harhash as Ansh Singh – Mamta and Vardhan's son; Mehak's and Vivek's adoptive's brother (2019–2020)

=== Special appearances ===
- Sara Khan to promote Dance Performed in School Party (2019)
- Jigyasa Singh as Heer Singh from Shakti - Astitva Ke Ehsaas Ki (2020)

== Cancellation ==
Due to low TRP's at 7 pm time slot, the show went off-air during COVID-19 pandemic. The show went off air without completing its story on 30 March 2020. This show was eventually replaced by Ishq Mein Marjawan 2 on 13 July 2020.
