= Sudeep Sahir =

Indian actor

- Occupations: Actor; model
- Years active: 2003–present
- Known for: Woh Apna Sa; Paramavatar Shri Krishna; Tera Yaar Hoon Main
- Spouse: Anantica Sahir (m. 2008)
- Children: 1

Sudeep Sahir is an Indian actor known for his work in Kunal Ganjawala's music video "Channa Vey" and later in Saregama's television serial Odhni. He is known for portraying Aditya Jindal in Woh Apna Sa, Krishna in Paramavatar Shri Krishna, and Rajeev Bansal in Tera Yaar Hoon Main.

== Personal life ==
Sahir is married to writer Anantica Sahir, and they have one son.

== Selected filmography ==
=== Film ===
List of film appearances, with year, title, and role shown
Year	Title	Role	Ref.
2014	Lekar Hum Deewana Dil	Dev Nigam	

=== Television ===
List of television appearances, with year, title, and role shown
Year	Title	Role	Notes	Ref.
2003–2004	Kyun Hota Hai Pyarrr	Aditya		
2005	Ayushmaan	Ayushmaan		
2006–2007	Jabb Love Hua	Raghu		
2007–2009	Santaan	Kartik		
2009	Nach Baliye 4	Contestant	9th place	
2010–2011	Behenein	Mihir Sanghvi	1 episode	
2011–2012	Main Lakshmi Tere Aangan Ki	Arjun Rajvardhan Agnihotri		
2014–2016	Box Cricket League	Himself / contestant	2 seasons	
2015	Shastri Sisters: Chaar Dil Ek Dhadkan	Veer		
2015–2016	Dream Girl — Ek Ladki Deewani Si	Raghu		
2017–2018	Woh Apna Sa	Aditya Jindal / Arjun Khanna		
2019–2020	Paramavatar Shri Krishna	Krishna		
2020–2022	Tera Yaar Hoon Main	Rajeev Bansal		
2025	Parineetii	Prithvi Agnihotri		
