= Shastri Sisters =

Indian television series

- Also known as: Shastri Sisters Chaar Dil Ek Dhadkan
- Genre: Indian Soap Opera; Drama; Romance
- Created by: Shakuntalam Telefilms
- Written by: Neelima Bajpai; Damini Kanwal Shetty; Kalpana Khurana; Rajita Sharma; Nidhi Singh; Amit Babbar
- Directed by: Jignesh M Vaishnav; Lalit Jha
- Creative director: Mrinal Tripathi
- Starring: See below
- Country of origin: India
- Original language: Hindi
- No. of episodes: 329

Production
- Producers: Neelima Bajpai; Shymashis Bhattacharya
- Production locations: Delhi; Mumbai; Kanpur
- Editor: Afzal Sheikh
- Running time: 22 minutes
- Production company: Shakuntalam Telefilms

Original release
- Network: Colors TV
- Release: 21 July 2014 – 8 August 2015

Shastri Sisters: Chaar Dil Ek Dhadkan (transl. Shastri sisters: four hearts, one heart beat), commonly known as Shastri Sisters, is an Indian television series that aired from July 21, 2014, to August 8, 2015, on Colors TV. The show stars Ishita Ganguly, Sonal Vengurlekar, Vijayendra Kumeria, and Sumit Bhardwaj. Its plot follows four sisters as they journey from Kanpur to Delhi.

The show was dubbed in Telugu as Manam, which airs on Gemini TV, and in Tamil as Kanchana airing on Raj TV. It is titled Tere Naal Ishq on Colors Rishtey.

== Plot ==
Four sisters Alka, Anushka, Devyani, and Piya live with their father Narayan Shastri in Kanpur. They lost their mother at a young age and were raised single-handedly by Narayan. They move to Delhi after Narayan gets a job transfer, where they stay at his childhood friend Surinder Sareen's house. Surinder lives with his wife Minty and two sons, Neil and Rajat. Minty and Neil hate the sisters and try to oust them.

Narayan learns that Alka loves Rajeev, and thus takes a marriage proposal to Rajeev's father, but Narayan feels insulted instead. After knowing all this, Alka apologizes to Narayan. He fixes her alliance to his friend Harishankar's son, Rohan Pandey, and thus the two marry.

Both Anushka and Devyani fall in love with Rajat, who has feelings for Anushka. Neil falls in love with Devyani but she rejects him. When Rajat tries to confess his love for Anushka to his family, Minty and Nikki decide to seek revenge for Neil from Devyani. They create a misunderstanding and make everyone believe that Rajat loves Devyani. Everyone prepares for their engagement and when Anushka learns that Devyani also loves Rajat, she sacrifices her love for Devyani. Rajat learns on his engagement day that he is getting engaged to Devyani and he wants to tell her the truth, but is stopped by Anushka. Anushka makes Rajat promise her to become engaged to her sister and he reluctantly agrees. Rajat and Devyani become engaged. As Minty and Nikki's plan fail, they again try to expose Anushka and Rajat. This time they succeed. Devyani becomes heartbroken after knowing the truth and she insults Anushka, accusing her of taking her fiancé, but Anushka remains silent. Rajat criticises her for disrespecting her sister, and tells her that he loves Anushka and not her. Anushka refuses and says that Rajat is only Devyani's.

The next day, Surinder and Rajat learn about Minty and Nikki. Surinder ousts Nikki from the house and scolds Minty.

Rajat's ex-girlfriend, Karishma, appears. To make Anushka jealous, Rajat announces his marriage to Karishma, but Anushka remains focused on her relationship with her sister. Later, Devyani tries to convince Anushka to stop Rajat's marriage and discusses this matter with Rajat, who insists that Anushka should profess her love for him first. He is later arrested and Anushka is blamed for his arrest. It is revealed that Karishma is responsible.

Rajat and Anushka finally marry. Neil is forced by Minty to marry her friend Leela's daughter, Kajal, which upsets Devyani, who decides to work with Alka. Someone attacks Devyani at work and she suspects Neil's involvement. Anushka blames Neil for hurting Devyani, but he insists that he is innocent. After three days everyone returns home and Neil returns from jail.

Kajal is revealed to have married Neil only for his property, so Minty scolds her and ends her relationship with Neil. Kajal pushes Anushka off a cliff, and Rajat is kidnapped.

One year later, the Sareens and Shastris celebrate. Rajat and Devyani begin the wedding ceremony, but Anushka is revealed to be alive.

== Cast ==
=== Main ===
- Ishita Ganguly as Anushka Rajat Sareen (née- Shastri) – Narayan's second daughter; younger sister of Alka and elder sister of Devyani and Piya; Rajat's wife
- Vijayendra Kumeria in dual roles:-
  - (1) As Squadron Leader Rajat Sareen – An air force pilot; Minty and Surinder's elder son; Neil's elder brother; Anushka's husband; Devyani's first ex-fiancé
  - (2) As Sameer—A terrorist who kidnapped Rajat; Devyani's husband; (Dead)
- Neha Pednekar as Alka Rohan Pandey (née- Shastri) – Narayan's eldest daughter; Devyani, Anushka, and Piya's elder sister; Rohan's wife; the youngest Bahu of Pandey house
- Sujay Reu as Rohan Harishankar Pandey – Harishankar and Vrinda's younger son; Alka's husband
- Sonal Vengurlekar as Devyani Narayan Shastri – Narayan's third daughter; younger sister of Alka and Anushka; elder sister of Piya; Rajat and Neil's ex-fiancée
- Sumit Bhardwaj as Neil Sareen – Minty and Surinder's younger son; Rajat's younger brother; Devyani's second ex-fiánce

=== Recurring ===
- Rajesh Jais as Narayan Shastri – Surinder's childhood friend; Alka, Anushka, Devyani and Piya's father
- Pragati Chourasiya as Piya Narayan Shastri – Narayan's youngest daughter; Alka, Anushka and Devyani's younger sister
- Neelu Kohli as Mintakshi "Minty" Sareen – Surinder's wife; Rajat and Neil's mother
- Gireesh Sahedev as Surinder Sareen – Narayan's childhood friend; Minty's husband; Rajat and Neil's father
- Chaitrali Gupte as Vrinda Pandey – Harishankar's wife; Sunil and Rohan's mother
- Prithvi Zutshi as Harishankar Pandey – Vrinda's husband; Sunil and Rohan's father
- Shraddha Jaiswal as Aastha Sunil Pandey; Sunil's wife; Rohan and Alka's Bhabi; the eldest Bahu of Pandey house
- Navneet Nishan as Nikki; Minty's best friend
- Puneet Vashisht as Dr. Raghavendra Singh — Mad doctor who was arrested for harassing Anushka after saving her life
- Sudeep Sahir as Veer; Rajat's childhood friend and Anushka's ex-fiancé
- Sumit Verma as Rajeev Shrivastav – Alka's ex-boyfriend
- Sudha Chandran as Buaji — Karishma's mother; Lalit Sharma's wife; her husband was a proud transport minister
- Swati Kumar as Karishma Lalit Sharma; Buaji and Lalit Sharma's boastful, proud and spoilt daughter; Rajat's ex-girlfriend; loved Rajat badly and hence committed crimes to marry him
- Priyanka Khera as Kajal Neil Sareen – Neil's greedy ex-wife; she was arrested for committing multiple crimes
- Poonam Bhatia as Leela Massi – Minty's greedy college friend; Kajal's partner in crime
- Smita Singh as Inspector Guggal Pandey; dealt with Kajal's case.
- Dipika Kakar as Simar; appeared in special episode.
- Sima Pari as Neighbour
- Shiva Kumar as Book shop owner
