= Ayushman Bhava (TV series) =

- Written by: Sanjay Bhatia; Neha Singh
- Directed by: Jalinder Kumbhar Sohit k sarkar Thakuri
- Presented by: White Horse International
- Country of origin: India
- Original language: Hindi
- No. of episodes: 100

Production
- Producers: R.Sathish Kumar; Anuraddha Sarin
- Production locations: Mumbai, India
- Cinematography: Mohan Naidu
- Camera setup: Multi-camera
- Running time: 21 mins.

Original release
- Network: Star Bharat
- Release: 28 August – 30 December 2017

Ayushman Bhava is an Indian television series which aired on STAR Bharat. The series stars Avinash Sachdev and Sumit Bhardwaj.

== Plot ==
Set in present-day Mathura, Krish Mehra (Ricky Patel / Sumit Bhardwaj) is the troubled son of Madhav and Sudha Mehra who grows up recalling his past life when he was Avinash Dubey (Avinash Sachdev), a software engineer who was betrayed and killed by his best friend, girlfriend, and boss. The story is about Krish and how he takes his revenge on those who killed him in his past life.

== Cast ==
- Avinash Sachdev as Avinash Dubey: Kailashnath and Kaushalya's son; Pragati's younger brother;Samaira's former boyfriend; Sudheer's former friend; Krish's past life (Dead)
- Sumit Bhardwaj as Krishna "Krish" Mehra: Madhav and Sudha's son;Kavya's husband;Avinash's reincarnation
  - Ricky Patel as Child Krishna "Krish" Mehra
- Megha Gupta / Kajal Jain as Samaira Singhania: Gayatri's daughter; Vikrant's wife; Kavya's step-mother;Avinash's former girlfriend
- Manish Goel as Vikrant Singhania:Mai's son;Babli's brother; Samaira's husband; Kavya's father; one of Avinash's murderers
- Tisha Kapoor as Kavya “Gungun” Mehra (née Singhania) : Vikrant's daughter; Samaira's step-daughter;Mai's granddaughter; Krish's wife
- Sudha Chandran as Mrs. Singhania / Mai: Vikrant and Babli's mother;Kavya's grandmother
- Kapil Srivastav as Sudheer Mathur: Babli's husband;Avinash's former friend; One of Avinash's murderers
- Urmimala Sinha Roy as Babli Mathur (née Singhania) : Vikrant's sister; Mai's daughter; Sudheer's wife
- Mahesh Badal as Badri Narayan
- Krishna Shetty as Rudra: Avinash's former friend;one of Avinash's murderers
- Shahab Khan as Kailashnath Dubey
- Savita Prabhune as Kaushalya Dubey
- Sayaji Shinde as Sub-Inspector Govind Mathre: One of Avinash's murderers (dead)
- Sameer Sharma as Kartik: Avinash's former boss; One of Avinash's murderers
- Yogesh Mahajan as Madhav Mehra: Sudha's husband; Krish's father (dead)
- Priya Marathe as Sudha Mehra: Madhav's wife; Krish's mother (dead)
- Aruna Sangal as Gayatri: Samaira's mother
- Sarita Joshi as Payal
- Gaurav K. Jha as Jassi
- Ahmad Harhash as Raj Jha
