= Sonal Vengurlekar =

Indian television actress

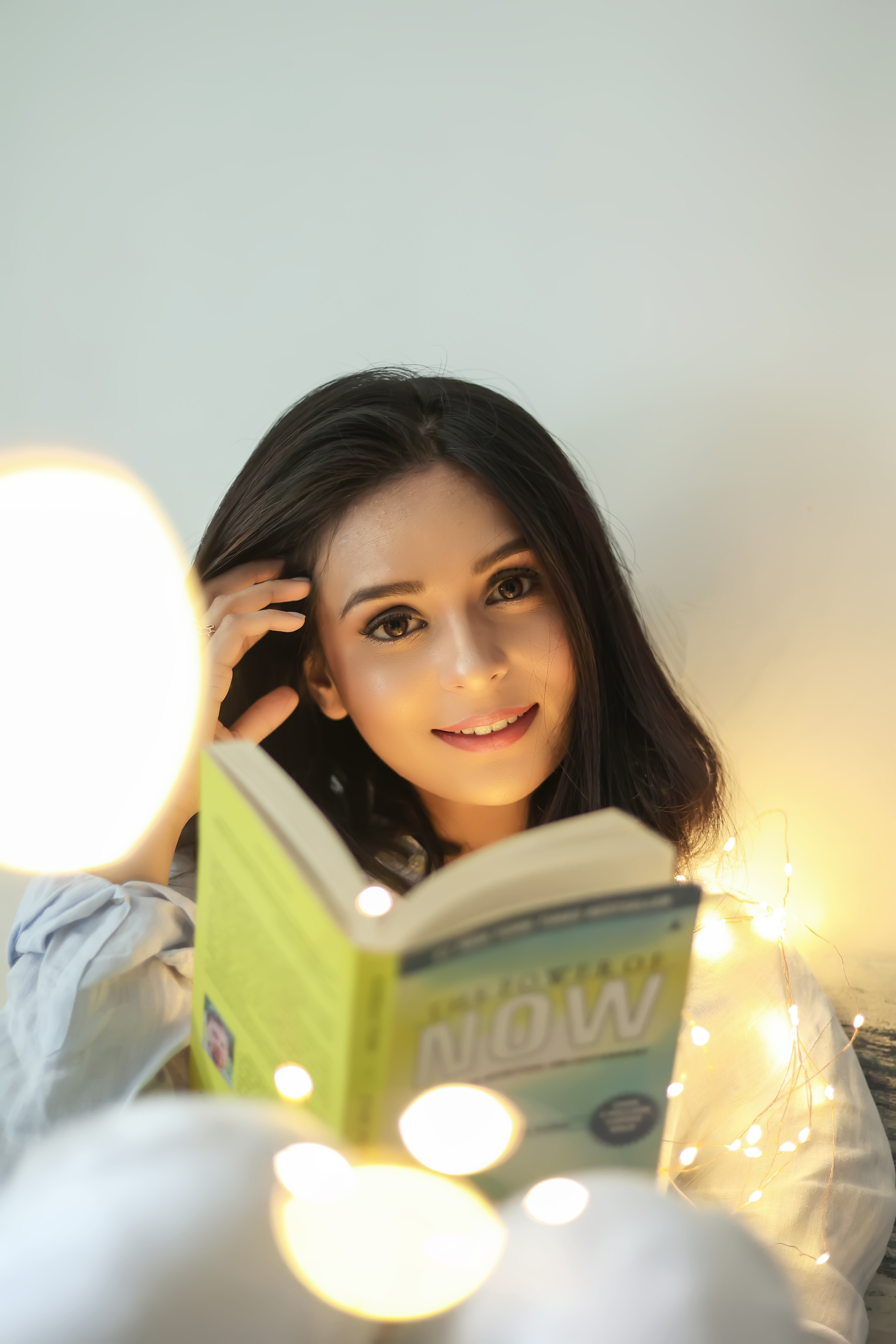
- Vengurlekar in 2022
- Born: 12 June 1993 (age 33); Mumbai, Maharashtra India
- Occupation: Actress
- Years active: 2006–present
- Known for: The Buddy Project; Shastri Sisters; Yeh Vaada Raha; Saam Daam Dand Bhed; Kundali Bhagya

Sonal Vengurlekar is an Indian television actress who appears in Hindi television. She is known for playing Rukmini Sharma in The Buddy Project (2013–2014), Devyani Shastri in Shastri Sisters (2014–2015), Survi Barve and Khushi Dharmadhikari in Yeh Vaada Raha (2015–2017), Mandira Rajput in Saam Daam Dand Bhed (2017–2018), and Anjali Hinduja in Kundali Bhagya (2022–2023).

== Career ==
In 2012, Vengurlekar ventured into the television industry. She appeared in Dil Dosti Dance and Buddy Project.

In 2014, she gained stardom on television from the serial Shastri Sisters. She also worked in Yeh Vaada Raha. Sonal was seen in Yeh Teri Galiyan and Laal Ishq as Nandini and Riya, in the year 2019.

From 2020 to 2021, Vengurlekar portrayed Jaya Gupta in Star Bharat's Gupta Brothers. In 2021, she was cast as Sanya Dubash in StarPlus' popular show Yeh Hai Chahatein.

In 2022, she joined as Savitri in Sony TV's Mere Sai - Shraddha Aur Saburi. She played Kiran in Parineetii. Later she was portrayed Anjali in Kundali Bhagya.

== Personal life ==
In 2018, Vengurlekar accused photographer and casting director, Raja Bajaj, father of TV actress Sheena Bajaj, of sexually harassing her during her struggling days. She has also been a very vocal supporter of the Me Too movement in India.

== Television ==
Year	Serial	Role	Notes	Ref.
2011	Kuch Toh Log Kahenge	Dr. Ahana		
2011–2012	R. K. Laxman Ki Duniya	Various		
2012–2013	Alaxmi – Humari Super Bahu	Hiral		
2013	Dil Dosti Dance	Ruhi Sonkari		
2013–2014	The Buddy Project 2	Rukmini Sharma		
2014–2015	Shastri Sisters	Devyani Shastri		
2015	Police Factory	Priya Devgan		
2015	Kumkum Bhagya	Survi Barve	Guest appearance	
2015–2016	Yeh Vaada Raha	Survi Barve		
2016–2017	Yeh Vaada Raha	Khushi Dharmadhikari		
2016	Ek Tha Raja Ek Thi Rani	Survi Barve	Guest appearance	
2017	Dev	Pranali Saluja		
2017–2018	Saam Daam Dand Bhed	Mandira Singh Rajput		
2018	We met at the wrong time	Herself	Short film	
2019	Yeh Teri Galiyan	Nandini Mazumdar		
Laal Ishq	Riya	Episode 49: "Qatil Naag Ka Tattoo"		
2020–2021	Gupta Brothers	Jaya Gupta		
2021	Yeh Hai Chahatein	Sanya Dubash Thakur		
2022	Mere Sai - Shraddha Aur Saburi	Savitri		
2022	Parineetii	Kiran Kapoor		
2022–2023	Kundali Bhagya	Anjali Hinduja		
2024	Doree	Pavitra		
2025	Lekar Hum Deewana Dil	Rati		
2025	Jamai No. 1	Saili Deshpande		
