= Yeh Vaada Raha (TV series) =

- Inter-title of Yeh Vaada Raha
- Genre: Drama; Romance; Revenge
- Created by: Trishulla Productions LLP
- Written by: Vivek Behl; Mahesh Pandey; Sunjoy Shekhar
- Directed by: Harak Sawant; Mahesh Pandey
- Starring: Ankush Arora; Sonal Vengurlekar; Zain Imam; Rinku Karmarkar Ahmad Harhash
- Country of origin: India
- Original language: Hindi
- No. of seasons: 2
- No. of episodes: 349

Production
- Producers: Deepak Kumar Bhagat; Mahesh Pandey; Vikas Seth
- Production locations: Mumbai; Nashik
- Editors: Shashank Singh; Ajay Singh
- Running time: 21 minutes
- Production company: Trishulla Productions LLP

Original release
- Network: Zee TV
- Release: September 21, 2015 – 20 January 2017

Yeh Vaada Raha (transl. It's a promise) is a Hindi-language Indian television drama series that aired on Zee TV from 21 September 2015 to 20 January 2017. It is where the main characters, Karthik and Survi were shown in their previous birth and they are now reborn as Karthik and Survi. The show initially focused on the love story of Survi (Sonal Vengurlekar) and Karthik (Ankush Arora). However the show then took an eight-year leap after Survi's death and her daughter, Khushi, who was seven years old, has grown up (also led by Vengurlekar) and marries Abeer (Zain Imam), the new male lead of the show. it was replaced by Woh Apna Sa.

== Premise ==
The show started off with the story of its main protagonists, Survi Mohite and Kartik Barve. After a generation leap, it focused on the love story of their daughter, Khushi, and Abeer Dharmadhikari.

== Plot ==
Survi, aged 9 is mature and responsible, raised by Shrikant. Kartik, aged 19 is impulsive and childish. In an unfortunate event, the police shoots his uncle Digambar to death; his aunt Kamla blames Shrikant and vows revenge. He and Survi forcibly move to Dubai. Kartik promises Kamla to care for the family.

=== 4 years later ===
Rich, Kartik decides to bring Survi as he always had great respect for Shrikant who he promised to care for her. Survi learns Kamla only wants Kartik's property. She tells Survi that she'll harm Kartik if she doesn't leave. Survi agrees. Kartik's mother Lata learns Kamla's truth, who pushes her off the roof and blames Survi. Believing Kamla blindly, Kartik starts hating Survi.

=== 8 years later ===
Survi grows up as nurse; due to her so-called betrayal Kartik is a cold-hearted alcoholic. For money for Shrikant's surgery, Survi meets Kartik who lets her stay. His cousin Aniket falls in love with Survi. Kartik finds out her innocence and realises he loves her. Survi announces to marry Aniket who runs away. Kartik weds her to protect her dignity.

Survi exposes Kamla. Kartik kicks off her out but gives all his property to her. He starts to work as a mechanic. Survi is pregnant. Kamla acts later to have lost her memory and kidnaps Khushi (Survi and Kartik's newborn daughter), leading them to separate as they assume her dead. On a train, one of the kidnappers hands Khushi to Survi who adopts her, unaware she's her real daughter.

=== 7 years later ===
Khushi lives with Survi and runs into Kartik, who bonds with her. Kamla learns she is their real daughter. Khushi's truth comes out as Kartik and Survi argue and unite. For revenge, Kamla makes Kartik mental. Krishna, his twin enters to create problems on his return. All family members except Khushi and Kartik die. Kamla also kills Survi. In hospital before her death, Khushi promises her to care for the mentally deranged Kartik.

=== 15 years later ===
Khushi grows up. She clashes with Abir Dharmadhikari, a playboy. They land in a village. To lie to villagers of them being fiancés, Abir kisses Khushi. They fall in love and are forced to marry; Abir's parents refuse to accept Khushi. Kamla is back for revenge, but gets arrested again. In the end, Khushi is accepted by her in-laws.

== Cast ==
=== Main ===
- Sonal Vengurlekar in a dual role as:
  - Survi Barve: Shrikant's daughter; Aniket's ex-fiancé; Kartik's wife; Khushi's mother (2015–2016)
    - Roshni Walia as Young Survi (2015)
  - Khushi Dharmadhikari: Kartik and Survi's daughter; Abir's wife (2016–2017)
    - Harbandana Kaur as Young Khushi (2016)
- Ankush Arora in a dual role as:
  - Kartik Barve: Sitaram and Lata's first twin son; Krishna and Shanti's brother; Survi's husband; Khushi's father (2015–2017)
    - Krishna Soni as Elder Kartik Barve
  - Krishna Barve: Sitaram and Lata's second twin son; Kartik and Shanti's brother (2016)
- Rinku Karmarkar as Kamla Barve: Digambar's wife; Hema, Aniket and Bindu's mother (2015–2017)
- Zain Imam as Abir Dharamadhikari: Manoj and Kamini's son; Khushi's husband (2016–2017)
- Gaurav Bajpai as Pyare Mohan tripathi Gaurav Nominated Best Actor In comic Male (2016–2017)

=== Recurring ===
- Himanshu Rai as Ajitesh "Ajju" Shinde (2015)
- Ajay Paul Singh as Digambar Barve: Sitaram's brother; Kamla's husband; Hema, Aniket and Bindu's father (2015) (Cameo)
- Pankaj Vishnu as Shrikant Mohite: Survi's father (2015–2016)
- Rumi Khan as Druv Ranka
- Jinal Jain as Hema Tripathi: Digambar and Kamla's elder daughter; Aniket and Bindu's sister; Pyare's wife; Riya's mother (2015–2016)
- Rashmi Gupta as Bindiya "Bindu" Barve: Digambar and Kamla's younger daughter; Hema and Aniket's sister (2015–2016)
- Radhika Muthukumar as Shanti Barve: Sitaram and Lata's daughter; Kartik and Krishna's sister (2015–2016)
  - Almas Ali as Young Shanti (2015)
- Shashank Mishra as Raghu Nath (2016)
- Gaurav Bajpai as Pyare Mohan Tripathi: Hema's husband (2015–2016)
- Amit Phatak as Kishore
- Madhavi Gogate / Radhika Vidyasagar as Lata Barve: Sitaram's wife; Kartik, Krishna and Shanti's mother (2015–2016)
- Sehrish Ali as Vishaka (2015)
- Faisal Khan as Paltak (2016)
- Vaishali Takkar as Simran (2016)
- Ankit Raizada as Karan (2016)
- Vaishali Thakkar (2016)
- Ankitta Sharma as Meher Khanna: Ranbir's sister; Kartik's obsessed lover (2016)
- Yash Tonk as Ranbir Khanna: Meher's brother (2016)
- Manish Goplani as Chetan (2016) (Cameo)
- Prasad Barve as Jatin Mehta (2016)
- Tamannah Deepak as Riya Tripathi: Pyare and Hema's daughter (2016)
- Abhiyan Singh as Rohit Kishore Barve
- Soni Singh as Kalindi
- Vikas Sethi as CBI Officer Vikram Khurana
- Vaishnavi Dhanraj as Iccha Sengupta: Aniket's love interest (2016)
- Ashita Dhawan as Kamini Dharmadhikari: Manoj's wife; Abir's mother (2016–2017)
- Nasirr Khan as Manoj Pratap Dharmadhikari: Kamini's husband; Abir's father (2016–2017)
- Ahmad Harhash as Veer Malhotra: Kamini's brother Abir's brother (2015–2017)

== Awards ==
Year	Recipient	Award	Event	Result	References
2015	Ankush Arora	Favourite Beta	Zee Rishtey Awards	Won	
2015	Sonal Vengurlekar	Naya Sadasya	Zee Rishtey Awards	Won	
2015	Mahesh Pandey	Best Screenplay	Zee Rishtey Awards	Won	
2015	Rinku Karmarkar	Dulara Dushman	Zee Rishtey Awards	Nominated	
