= Kaun Hai? =

Indian horror series

- Genre: Horror
- Created by: Abhimanyu Singh
- Developed by: Abhimanyu Singh
- Written by: Arshad Sayed
- Screenplay by: Arshad Sayed
- Story by: Arshad Sayed
- Creative directors: Aman Jain; Nitish Ranjan
- Composer: The Music Factory
- Country of origin: India
- Original language: Hindi
- No. of seasons: 2
- No. of episodes: 41

Production
- Executive producers: Abhimanyu Singh; Dupari Singh
- Producers: Abhimanyu Singh; Rupali Singh
- Production location: Mumbai
- Cinematography: Indranil Singha
- Editor: K. Raj Gopal
- Camera setup: Multiple-camera
- Running time: 40 - 45 minutes approximately
- Production company: Contiloe Pictures

Original release
- Network: Colors TV
- Release: 29 June – 14 October 2018

Kaun Hai? (transl. who is?) is an Indian Hindi horror anthology television series produced by Contiloe Entertainment. It premiered 29 June 2018 on Colors TV and ended on 14 October 2018 that same year, lasting two seasons.

Kaun Hai? season 1 featured an episodic cast and finished off with 33 episodes on 16 September 2018 to make way for Kaun Hai? 2, a series for 8 episodes starring real-life couple Vatsal Sheth and Ishita Dutta with Amrapali Gupta in a negative role.

== Plot ==
=== Season 1 ===
The program is based on that real fear, experienced by people in haunted places.

=== Season 2 ===
The story starts with a battle of the Daityas and the Puranas because the Daityas wanted to open the door to hell and take control of the world by letting Asuras run rampant. While the Daityas are Diti (Amrapali Gupta), her elder son Hiranyakashipu (Arpit Ranka), and her younger son Hiranyaksha (Vatsal Sheth); the Puranas include Hiranyakashipu's son, Prahlad, and his teacher Anandi (Neetha Shetty), both of whom are devotees of Lord Vishnu. In the battle, Hrinayakashipu is killed by Vishnu's Narasimha avatar. Later, Hiranyaksha also dies at the hands of Vishnu, but he vows that he will reincarnate to fulfill his destiny and make his mother the queen of the world.

Thousands of years later, a child named Yatin Chaudhary is born and is revealed to be Hiranyaksha's reincarnation. Diti starts working in the Chaudhary house as Yatin’s nanny. Diti's reality is found out by Krishika, Yatin's biological mother, but Krishika is killed by her.

Yatin has grown up and is a 24-year-old boy, having the powers of Hiranyaksha from his past with the help of Diti, who has confined Krishika's spirit in a secret room to suppress Yatin's goodness. Hiranyakashipu's spirit is alive through the flames and he meets Yatin and Diti. He tells them to complete the mission so he can be alive again.

The next day, Yatin sees Vaishnavi (Ishita Dutta), a beautiful innocent girl who is the daughter of Dutta (Inder's rival). Later it is revealed that Vaishnavi is the reincarnation of Vishnu's Narasimha avatar. Vaishnavi is unaware of her real identity.

Diti encourages Yatin to kill Vaishnavi, but only after they get married. The only way to get the doors of hell to open is by killing Vaishnavi and stealing her powers. Her powers will awaken only after her marriage with Yatin.

Yatin woos Vaishnavi as per plan. However, Vaishnavi's dad is against their relationship. Diti calls upon a blood-sucking witch to control Dutta and get him to agree to the wedding.

Meanwhile, Anandi tries to reveal Vaishnavi's real identity to her but Vaishnavi isn't willing to trust her and thinks Anandi is crazy.

Yatin's goodness starts to prevail over him and he starts falling for Vaishnavi. Vaishnavi and Yatin get married even after the Puranas try to stop their union. After the wedding, Vaishnavi starts gaining her power.

Later, Yatin fails to kill Vaishnavi on their wedding night and realizes he truly loves her and can't hurt her. Vaishnavi learns the truth about herself and her destiny. She is hurt to know that Yatin betrayed her.

On the other hand, Prahlada sacrifices himself to bring his father back to life so Vaishnavi can end him once and for all.

Hiranyakashipu encourages Yatin to kill Vaishnavi but Yatin isn't able to. In rage, Hiranyakashipu stabs Yatin and decides to take revenge on Narashima for what happened in the past. However, he ends up dying the same death.

Time runs out as the three stars go past their alignment. Diti vanishes as Asuras are eliminated once and for all. Yatin dies in Vaishnavi's arms and vows to be with her in each reincarnation.

== Production ==
Kaun Hai? is created by Abhimanyu Singh and is produced by his company Contiloe Pictures, which also created successful horror shows like Ssshhhh...Phir Koi Hai and Fear Files: Darr Ki Sacchi Tasvirein for Star One and Zee TV respectively.

Colors programming head, Manisha Sharma said, "Through Kaun Hai? we are going back to the basics and reviving the genre to make our entertainment catalogue robust."

The series has been filmed in various parts of India. Abhimanyu Singh - CEO Contiloe Pictures said "Kaun Hai has been shot extensively across location in various parts of the country such as Kashmir, Rajasthan, Gujarat, Calcutta, Madhya Pradesh to name a few."

First episode was shot in Kashmir and starred Shaleen Bhanot. "It was shot in Kashmir and I am very fascinated by hills and mountains. It was great fun," said Bhanot.

== Reception ==
The first episode of the show received 3.89 million impressions, and ranked at 11th position in the list of top 20 Hindi TV shows.

=== Response from artists ===
Some actors experienced spooky experiences while shooting. Bhanot said, "I never used to believe in ghosts until 'Kaun Hai?'. But I had a couple of spooky experiences while shooting." Speaking about the story, he said that the story was "brilliant and scary". While shooting in a haveli, Ishita Ganguly said that "she experienced an eerie feeling around her at all times". Charu Asopa who shot for the episode "Warehouse No. 4", found its story interesting. "The reason for taking up horror series once again was the intriguing concept of Nightshift", she said. She found the story so scary that she "found it hard to get proper sleep".

Rajkummar Rao and Shraddha Kapoor acted in "Stree visits a haunted studio" aired on 31 August 2018 for the promotion of their film Stree.

== Season-1 ==
Every week, two stories are telecast with one story being split into two episodes and the other story being shown in a single episode. Each story has a different star cast.

Story	Episode	Title	Directed by	Written by	Artists	Original release date
1	1	"Bewafa"	Rajesh Ranasinghe	Arshad Sayed	Shalin Bhanot, Neetha Shetty & Anaya Shivan	29 June 2018
An author and his family are haunted by a spirit whilst renting a room at an abandoned hotel in Mussoorie. The spirit decides to teach the author a lesson as he has been cheating on his wife.
2a	2	"The mysterious doll of Putulganj"	Govind Agrawal	Arshad Sayed	Pankhuri Awasthy Rode, Abhishek Malik, Roma Arora, Niya Sharma & Hemant Choudhary	30 June 2018
After she buys a doll from an antique shop, Anvesha suffers from nightmares relating to an old burnt down house. Babul Da finds that, in her past life, Anvesha was the reason behind her best friend's death.
2b	3	"The mysterious doll of Putulganj"	Govind Agrawal	Arshad Sayed	Pankhuri Awasthy Rode, Abhishek Malik, Roma Arora, Niya Sharma & Hemant Choudhary	1 July 2018
Anvesha runs out of time while saving herself and her friends from the spirit of Surangini. Everyone is shocked to find out the truth behind Surangini's murder.
3a	4	"The horror of the Jinn"	Govind Agrawal	Arshad Sayed	Anjali Abrol & Raj Logani	6 July 2018
3b	5	"The horror of the Jinn"	Govind Agrawal	Arshad Sayed	Anjali Abrol & Raj Logani	7 July 2018
Aamna is thrilled to know that she is indeed pregnant after the gin grants her wish. However, the gin demands that she offer her baby to him as his servant.
4	6	"The bats of Ranakpur"	Govind Agrawal	Arshad Sayed	Ankit Arora, Ishita Ganguly & Ashish Dixit	8 July 2018
5	7	"Anamika"	Rajesh Ranasinghe	Arshad Sayed	Payal Rajput & Manoj Chandila	13 July 2018
Suraj, a young forest officer, saves a woman from being killed in a bus accident and falls in love with her and marries her. However, Suraj does not know that the lady is a witch and plans to have a child with Suraj to increase her life span.
6a	8	"Black water"	Pavan Kaul	Arshad Sayed	Sonia Balani & Zaan Khan	14 July 2018
Sonika, a girl, is haunted by a ghost, who lives in a water body. The ghost leaves clues for Sonika to discover how she was murdered.
6b	9	"Black water"	Pavan Kaul	Arshad Sayed	Sonia Balani & Zaan Khan	15 July 2018
Sonika discovers that the ghost was a girl who used to date a boy, Rohit, in her building. Later, Rohit and Sonika find out that the dead girl was raped and killed by Rohit's older brother and he dumped her in a water tank.
7a	10	"Mother"	Govind Agrawal	Arshad Sayed	Pallavi Subhash & Lily Patel	20 July 2018
A young couple's daughter starts seeing a spirit and calls it Maa. Initially, everyone in the family ignores it, but then they realize that she is speaking the truth when the spirit starts to haunt them.
7b	11	"Mother"	Govind Agrawal	Arshad Sayed	Pallavi Subhash & Lily Patel	21 July 2018
A couple is in shock when they learn that their daughter has disappeared. Later, they decide that they should unite the spirit's daughter with her soul.
7c	12	"Mother"	Govind Agrawal	Arshad Sayed	Pallavi Subhash, Farah Hussain & Lily Patel	22 July 2018
A couple soon realizes that their daughter was born one hundred years ago and has been dead for a long period of time.
8	13	"Curse of the Karna Pishachini"	Pavan Kaul	Arshad Sayed	Sonali Nikam	27 July 2018
Aghoris helps Kalindi kill Surabhi, the younger daughter-in-law of the house, who is everyone's favorite. But things start to change when Kalindi becomes the target of Karn Pisaachini.
9	14	"Warehouse No. 4"	Vinod Manikrao	Arshad Sayed	Meer Ali, Charu Asopa & Nawab Khan	28 July 2018
A factory worker begins to work at night again, two years after the shift was stopped due to rumors of a demon. Soon, he notices the presence of a spirit when a number of untoward events occur.
10	15	"Shankchunni"	Pavan Kaul	Gibran Noorani	Romit Raj & Keertida Mistry, Anujha Wahle	3 August 2018
11a	16	"Manglik Bahu"	Rajesh Ranasinghe	Arshad Sayed	Sana Amin Sheikh & Vishal Gandhi	4 August 2018
Viren's deceased wife, Madhulika, possesses him on the day he marries Yamini, a 'manglik' girl. She threatens to kill Viren unless Yamini helps him find her killer.
11b	17	"Manglik Bahu"	Rajesh Ranasinghe	Arshad Sayed	Sana Amin Sheikh & Vishal Gandhi	5 August 2018
12	18	"Pind Daan"	Vinod Manikrao	Sameeir Modi	Ayaz Khan	10 August 2018
13a	19	"The Old Ruins"	Govind Agrawal	Arshad Sayed	Nikita Sharma, Reyaansh Chaddha, Vimarsh Roshan, Raja Kapse	11 August 2018
13b	20	"The Old Ruins"	Govind Agrawal	Arshad Sayed	Nikita Sharma, Reyaansh Chaddha, Vimarsh Roshan, Raja Kapse	12 August 2018
14	21	"The Haunted Jail"	Rajesh Ranasinghe	Aditya Narayan Singh & Gaurav Mishra	Sachin Shroff, Preet Kaur Madhan & Harshita Shukla	17 August 2018
15a	22	"The return of Vedal"	Rajesh Ranasinghe	Arshad Sayed	Jatin Shah & Heena Parmar	18 August 2018
15b	23	"The return of Vedal"	Rajesh Ranasinghe	Arshad Sayed	Jatin Shah & Heena Parmar	19 August 2018
16	24	"The curse of Bhanumati"	Ajay Mishra	Sameeir Modi	Tanya Sharma, Varun Sharma & Ankit Bhardwaj	24 August 2018
17a	25	"The heir of Dhawalgarh"	Rajeev Bhanot	Arshad Sayed	Piyali Munshi, Haelyn Shastri, Kanan Malhotra, Paras Kalnawat, Pravisht Mishra & Mak Mukesh Tripathi	25 August 2018
17b	26	"The heir of Dhawalgarh"	Rajeev Bhanot	Arshad Sayed	Piyali Munshi, Haelyn Shastri, Kanan Malhotra, Paras Kalnawat, Pravisht Mishra & Mak Mukesh Tripathi	26 August 2018
18	27	"Stree visits a haunted studio"	Ajay Mishra	Gibran Noorani	Rajkummar Rao, Shraddha Kapoor & Madhura Naik	31 August 2018
19a	28	"Servants of Lord Maarkaadev"	Govind Agrawal	Arshad Sayed	Alan Kapoor, Monica Sharma & Siraj Mustafa Khan	1 September 2018
19b	29	"Servants of Lord Maarkaadev"	Govind Agrawal	Arshad Sayed	Alan Kapoor, Monica Sharma & Siraj Mustafa Khan	2 September 2018
20	30	"The curse of the Aghori"	Ajay Mishra	Aditya Narayan Singh & Gaurav Mishra	Richa Mukherjee	7 September 2018
21a	31	"Doll of death"	Rajeev Bhanot	Arshad Sayed	Anshul Trivedi, Shritama Mukherjee & Cheshtha Bhagat	8 September 2018
21b	32	"Doll of death"	Rajeev Bhanot	Arshad Sayed	Anshul Trivedi, Shritama Mukherjee & Cheshtha Bhagat	9 September 2018
22	33	"The spirit of Kamli"	Govind Agrawal	Aditya Narayan Singh & Gaurav Mishra	Priya Marathe & Alok Narula	14 September 2018

=== Episodic Cast ===
- Shalin Bhanot
- Neetha Shetty as Anandi
- Anaya Shivan
- Pankhuri Awasthy Rode as Pauloma/Anvesha
- Abhishek Malik as Parth
- Roma Arora
- Niya Sharma
- Hemant Choudhary
- Anjali Abrol as Aamna
- Raj Logani
- Ankit Arora as Raghavendra
- Ishita Ganguly as Chandralekha/Raisa
- Ashish Dixit
- Payal Rajput as Anamika
- Manoj Chandila as Suraj
- Sonia Balani as Sonika
- Zaan Khan
- Pallavi Subhash as Aruna
- Farah Hussain
- Lily Patel
- Sonali Nikam
- Meer Ali
- Charu Asopa as Rani
- Nawab Khan
- Romit Raj
- Keertida Mistry
- Anujha Wahle
- Sana Amin Sheikh as Yamini
- Vishal Gandhi as Viren
- Ayaz Khan
- Nikita Sharma
- Reyaansh Chaddha
- Vimarsh Roshan
- Mak Mukesh Tripathi
- Raja Kapse
- Sachin Shroff as Abhinav
- Preet Kaur Madhan
- Harshita Shukla
- Jatin Shah
- Heena Parmar

== Season-2 ==
=== Main cast ===
- Vatsal Sheth as Hiranyaksha / Yatin Chaudhary
- Ishita Dutta as Vaishnavi / Vaishnavi Yatin Chaudhary
- Amrapali Gupta as Diti / Diti Inder Chaudhary
- Neetha Shetty as Anandi
- Arpit Ranka as Hiranyakashipu
- Ashish Dixit as Ankit Arora

== See also ==
- List of Hindi horror shows
