= Abhimanyu Singh (producer) =

Indian television producer

- Born: Abhimanyu Raj Singh; New Delhi, India
- Education: The Doon School; St. Stephen's College
- Occupation: Producer
- Years active: 1995-present
- Relatives: Chandrachur Singh (brother); Aditya Narain Singh (brother)

Abhimanyu Raj Singh is an Indian producer, who mainly produces Hindi-language television shows. He is the founder of production company, Contiloe Entertainment, which he co-founded with his brother, Aditya Narain Singh in 1995.

== Early life ==
Abhimanyu was born in New Delhi. He did his schooling from The Doon School, Dehradun and did his graduation from St. Stephen's College. He has two brothers Chandrachur Singh and Aditya Narain Singh.

== Filmography ==
=== Films ===
Year	Name	Ref.
2009	Maruti Mera Dost	
2014	Darr @ the Mall	
2016	Mahayodha Rama	
2021	State of Siege: Temple Attack	

=== Web shows ===
Year	Name	Ref.
2020	State of Siege: 26/11	
TBA	Taj- A Monument of Blood	

=== Television ===
Year	Name	Ref.
2001	Aankhen	
2001–2010	Ssshhhh...Koi Hai	
2001	Rahen Na Rahe Hum	
2002–2004	Krishna Arjun	
2003	Kashmeer	
2003–2004	Vikraal Aur Gabraal	
2004–2007	The Great Indian Comedy Show	
2004	Majooba ka Ajooba	
2004	Rooh	
2004	Aavishkaar - Ek Rakshak	
2005	He Man	
2005–2006	Yeh Dil Chahe More	
2006	Kuoni Hotspots	
2006	MTV Ishq Deewane	
2006	Gehre Pyaar Pe Laat	
2006–2007	Rang Jama De	
2007	Agadam Bagdam Tigdam	
2007	SAB Ka Bheja Fry	
2007	The Great Indian Love Challenge	
2007	Fun on the Run	
2008	Bhaago KK Aaya	
2008	Comedy Ka King Kaun	
2008	Say Shaava Shaava	
2008	Aajaa Mahi Vay	
2008–2009	Break Time Masti Time	
2008–2010	Cambala Investigation Agency - CIA	
2009	Arre Deewano Mujhe Pehchano	
2009	Maharshtrache Nach Baliye	
2009–2010	Maniben.com	
2009–2011	Jhansi Ki Rani	
2010–2011	Bitto	
2010–2016	Adaalat	
2011–2012	Veer Shivaji	
2011	Ammaji Ki Galli	
2012	Suno... Harr Dill Kuchh Kehtaa Hai	
2012–2014	Fear Files: Darr Ki Sacchi Tasvirein	
2013–2015	Bharat Ka Veer Putra – Maharana Pratap	
2014	Emotional Atyachar	
2015	Lage Raho Chachu	
2015–2016	The Great Indian Family Drama	
2015–2016	Chakravartin Ashoka Samrat	
2015–2016	Agent Raghav – Crime Branch	
2015–2017	Sankatmochan Mahabali Hanuman	
2017	Sher-e-Punjab: Maharaja Ranjit Singh	
2017–2018	Rudra Ke Rakshak	
2018	21 Sarfarosh - Saragarhi 1897	
2018	Kaun Hai?	
2019	Khoob Ladi Mardani Jhansi Ki Rani	
2019	Kesari Nandan	
2017–2020	Tenali Rama	
2020–2021	Kaatelal & Sons	
2017–2021	Vighnaharta Ganesha	
2022	Dharm Yoddha Garud	
2022	Yashomati Maiyaa Ke Nandlala	
2022–2024	Swaraj	
2024–2025	Tenali Rama 2	
2025	Chakravarti Samrat Prithviraj Chauhan	

== Awards and nominations ==
Year	Award	Category	Title	Result	Ref.
2006	Star Guild Awards	Best Comedy Series	The Great Indian Comedy Show	Won	
2006	Indian Telly Awards	Best Comedy Programme	The Great Indian Comedy Show	Nominated	
2007	Indian Telly Awards	Best Comedy Programme	The Great Indian Comedy Show	Nominated	
2007	Indian Television Academy Awards	Best Thriller/Horror Serial	Ssshhhh... Phir Koi Hai	Won	
2009	Indian Telly Awards	Best Historical or Mythological Serial	Jhansi Ki Rani	Won	
2010	Indian Telly Awards	Best Historical or Mythological Serial	Jhansi Ki Rani	Won	
2010	Indian Television Academy Awards	Best Historical or Mythological Serial	Jhansi Ki Rani	Won	
2012	Indian Telly Awards	Best Weekly Serial	Adaalat	Won	
2013	Indian Telly Awards	Best Thriller Programme	Adaalat	Nominated	
2013	Indian Television Academy Awards	Best Historical or Mythological Serial	Bharat Ka Veer Putra – Maharana Pratap	Won	
2014	Indian Television Academy Awards	Best Historical or Mythological Serial	Bharat Ka Veer Putra – Maharana Pratap	Won	
2014	Indian Television Academy Awards	Best Thriller Programme	Adaalat	Nominated	
2015	Indian Telly Awards	Best Historical or Mythological Serial	Chakravartin Ashoka Samrat	Nominated	
2015	Indian Telly Awards	Best Historical or Mythological Serial	Sankat Mochan Mahabali Hanumaan	Nominated	
2015	Gold Awards	Best Historical Show	Chakravartin Ashoka Samrat	Won	
2015	BIG Star Entertainment Awards	Most Entertaining Television Fiction Show	Chakravartin Ashoka Samrat	Nominated	
2016	Indian Television Academy Awards	Best Historical or Mythological Serial	Sankat Mochan Mahabali Hanumaan	Nominated	
2016	Indian Television Academy Awards	Best Historical or Mythological Serial	Chakravartin Ashoka Samrat	Nominated	
2017	National Film Awards	Best Animated Film	Mahayodha Rama	Won	
2017	Indian Television Academy Awards	Best Show (Popular)	Adaalat	Nominated	
2017	Indian Television Academy Awards	Best Show (Popular)	Sankat Mochan Mahabali Hanumaan	Won	
2017	Indian Television Academy Awards	Best Show (Popular)	Chakravartin Ashoka Samrat	Nominated	
2018	Indian Television Academy Awards	Best Children's Show	Tenali Rama	Won	
2021	Filmfare OTT Awards	Best Web Original Film	State of Siege: Temple Attack	Nominated	
