= Nivaan Sen =

Indian Theatre Television & Film Actor

- Born: 6 June; Varanasi, Uttar Pradesh, India
- Education: Masters in Sociology, Mahatma Gandhi Kashi Vidyapeeth
- Occupations: Actor; Producer
- Years active: 2004–present
- Known for: Kahaani Ghar Ghar Kii; Pyaar Ka Dard Hai Meetha Meetha Pyaara Pyaara; Do Hanson Ka Jodaa; Ghum Hai Kisikey Pyaar Meiin
- Spouse: Neelu Mahadur Sen
- Awards: Best Actor Award in Comic

Nivaan Sen, also known as Naveen Sen, is an Indian actor and producer. His production house name is 'Urban Boat Films'. He is known for his role in the Indian daily soaps Kahaani Ghar Ghar Kii, Pyaar Ka Dard Hai Meetha Meetha Pyaara Pyaara and Do Hanson Ka Jodaa. Nivaan Sen was awarded a Best Actor Award in Comedy for India's Best Cinestars Ki Khoj in 2004.

== Early life and background ==
Nivaan Sen was born and brought up in Varanasi, Uttar Pradesh. He has been involved in the theatre since childhood. He did his schooling from C. M. Anglo Bengali Inter College. He has played football since childhood, running from Uttar Pradesh. He completed his graduation and post-graduation from Mahatma Gandhi Kashi Vidyapeeth, Varanasi. He did his post-graduation in sociology.

== Career ==
Nivaan Sen started his career as a contestant on the 2004 Zee TV talent hunt reality show India's Best Cinestars Ki Khoj, where he won the title of India's Best Performance in Comic Role. He has appeared in several television shows such as Kahaani Ghar Ghar Kii in October 2007, most of which aired on Star Plus. In 2010, he worked on the TV serial Do Hanson Ka Jodaa, airing on NDTV Imagine.

== Filmography ==
=== Television ===
Year	Work	Show/Channel	Role	Notes	Ref(s)
2004	India's Best Cinestars Ki Khoj	Zee TV	Nivaan Sen	5th Runner Up	
2007	Kahaani Ghar Ghar Kii	Star Plus	Pranay	Supporting Role	
2007	Aahat	Sony Entertainment Television	Viney	Lead Role	
2007	Hari Mirchi Lal Mirchi	Doordarshan	Brother In Law		
2008	Ssshhhh...Phir Koi Hai	Star One	Vidhut	Episode Name:Amrauli Ke Darinde	
2008	Ssshhhh...Phir Koi Hai	Star One	Main Lead	Episode Name:Sandhya	
2008	Aathvaan Vachan	Sony Entertainment Television	Football Coach		
2008	Full Time Pass	Imagine Showbiz	Navin	Lead Role	
2010	Do Hanson Ka Jodaa	NDTV Imagine	Neeraj	Lead Role	
2011	Khote Sikke	Sony Entertainment Television	Amol	Lead Role	
2013	Pyaar Ka Dard Hai Meetha Meetha Pyaara Pyaara	Star Plus	Sahil	Lead Role	
2014	Fear Files	Zee TV	Nivaan	Lead Role	
2020	Savdhaan India	Star Bharat	Ayush	Lead Role (season :8, Episode :16)	
2021	Ghum Hai Kisikey Pyaar Meiin	Star Plus	Sadanand Pavle Aka Sada	Supporting role	

=== Films ===
Year	Work	Show/Channel	Role	Notes	Ref(s)
2020	Pledge	Pocket Films	Husband	Lead Role	
2022	Jhumke	ULLU	Ashok	Lead Role	

=== Web series ===
Year	Work	Show/Channel	Role	Notes	Ref(s)
2008	Akbar Birbal Remixed	Rajshri Media			
2021	Saat Kadam		Rajesh	Supporting role	
2022	Jhumke	Ullu	Ashok	Lead Role	

=== Producer ===
Year	Film	Notes
2019	Dhvani	Nominated in Dehradun International film festival Nominated in Lonavala international film festival Won Best Actor Award In Indian International Short Film Festival Award
2021	Pledge	Won Best Critics Award in Banaras Film Festival; Nominated in Dehradun international film festival Won Best Story Writer Award in Indian International Short Film Festival Award
2022	Binfull	Won Best Producer Award in Indian International Short Film Festival Award
2023	Jhumke	Won Best Actor Award In Film Affair Awards

== Awards and nominations ==
Year	Award	Category	Result
2004	Best Actor Award	Comedy	Won
2004	Best Actor Award	Fiction	Nominated
2023	Best Actor Award	Drama	Won
