= Aastha Chaudhary =

Indian television actress

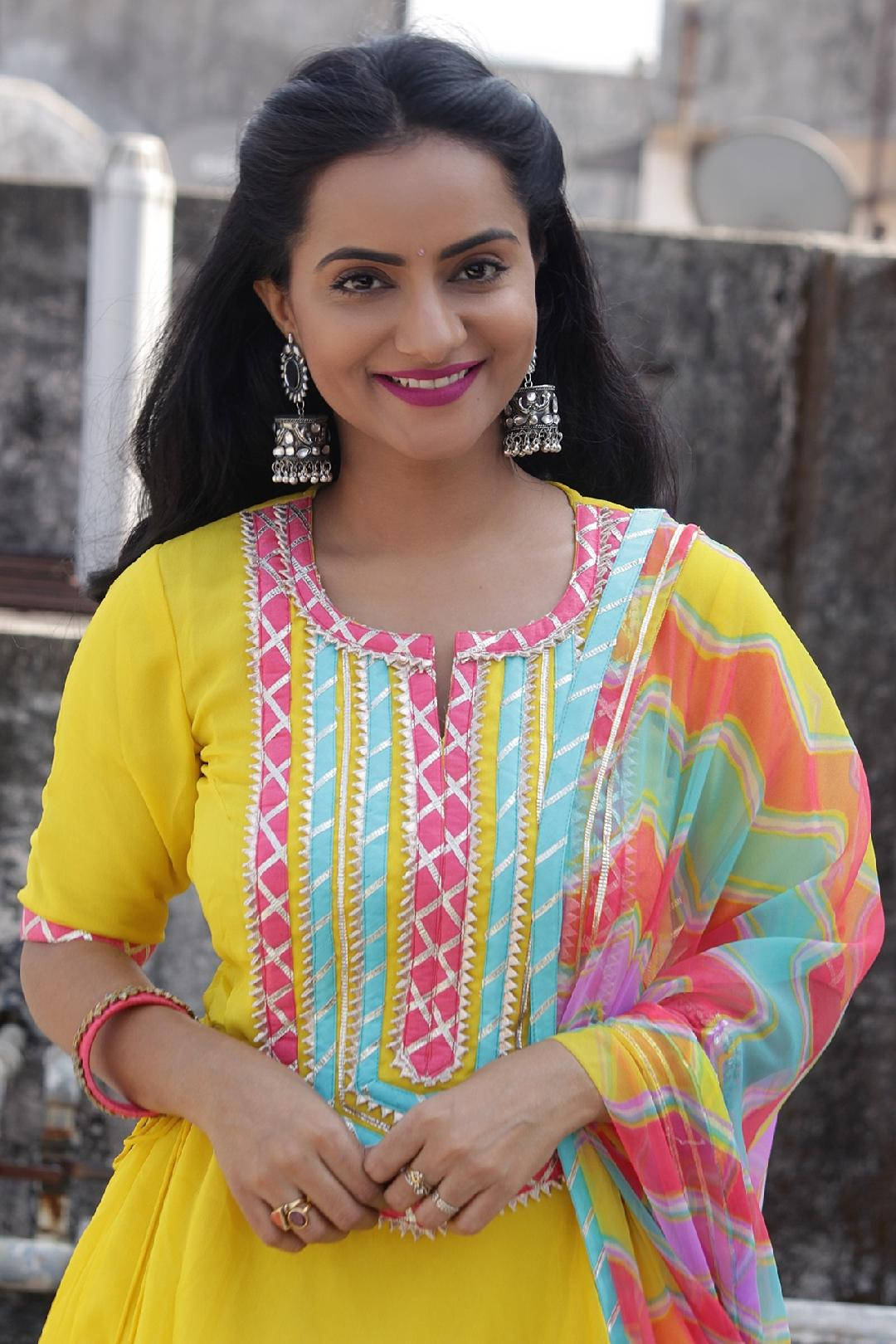
- Born: Alwar, Rajasthan, India
- Education: Jaipur Engineering College
- Occupation: Actress
- Years active: 2007–present
- Height: 5 ft 2 in (1.57 m)
- Spouse: Aditya Banerjee (m. 2022)

Aastha Chaudhary is an Indian television actress known for television drama serials, she started her acting career in 2007 with a zee TV serial Saat Phere – Saloni Ka Safar and got much popularity with Babul Ka Aangann Chootey Na, Uttaran, Aise Karo Naa Vidaa, Kesari Nandan. In 2025 Aastha became team owner of team Flying Warriors in Indian Pro Badminton League. She played Pavitra in Rimjhim in 2025.

Aastha's recent work was as main lead is web series Assi nabbe Poore Sau

== Personal life ==
Aastha Chaudhary born on 20 July in Alwar, Rajasthan. She did her schooling from Alwar and then completed her engineering from Jaipur Engineering College. She always had a dream to be an army officer.

== Web series ==
Aastha played main lead "Rukhsana" in Ullu originals web series "Assi Nabbe Poore Sau"

== Filmography ==
=== Television ===
Year	Show	Role	Notes
2007	Saat Phere – Saloni Ka Safar	Urmila Singh	
2007	Rakhi – Atoot Rishtey Ki Dor	Gunjan	
2008–2009	Babul Ka Aangann Chootey Na	Aastha Shubh Ranawat / Payal Swayam Ranawat	
2009	Sssshhh...Phir Koi Hai	Episode 180 & Episode 181	Episodic roles
2009	Sssshhh...Phir Koi Hai	Uttara Virat Saniyal (Episode 196 - Episode 201)	Episodic roles
2010	Mahima Shani Dev Ki	Vaijayanti	Episodic roles
2010	Mahima Shani Dev Ki	Shakuntala	Episodic roles
2010	Aise Karo Naa Vidaa	Reva Singh	
2011	C.I.D.	Esha	Episode 713
2011	Uttaran	Madhura	
2012	Fear Files	Episode 20	Episodic roles
2012	Adaalat	Episode 166 & Episode 167	Episodic roles
2012	Ek Veer Ki Ardaas...Veera	Amrita Sampooran Singh	
2012	Savdhaan India	Geeta Joshi	Episode 2
2013	Savdhaan India	Priya Ajay Sharma	Episode 169
2013–2014	Rishton Ke Bhanwar Mein Uljhi Niyati	IPS Officer Niyati Shastri / IPS Officer Niyati Ishwar Sharma	
2019	Kesari Nandan	Madhavi Hanumant Singh	
2024	Mera Balam Thanedaar	Geeta Rajawat	
2024	Mehndi Wala Ghar	Manisha Agarwal Chaudhary	
2025	Rimjhim – Choti Umar Bada Safar	Pavitra	
2026–present	Yeh Rishta Kya Kehlata Hai	Nandini Raghav Damani	

=== Music video ===
Year	Title	singers	Notes
2020	Pihariye	Rapperiya Baalam, Sheetal Bansal	
