= Mohit Daga =

Indian actor

- Born: 15 August 1982 (age 43); Gadarwara, Madhya Pradesh
- Occupation: Actor
- Children: Ashwika daga

Mohit Daga (born 15 August 1982) is an Indian television actor. He is best known for his roles in Bhaskar Bharti, Aise Karo Naa Vidaa, Bairi Piya, Ek Mutthi Aasmaan and Tera Yaar Hoon Main.

== Early life and education ==
Mohit Daga was born in a Jain family in Gadarwara, Madhya Pradesh.

== Career ==
Influenced by his aunt Nilmani Desai Mohit Daga joined a modelling workshop in Pune. Thereafter he came to Mumbai in 2002 to join an acting workshop and got a small role in a serial named Kammal. With the dream of making a mark in the silver screen, Mohit joined Zee Cinestarts Ki Khoj a reality show in 2004 and finished as finalist there.

After Zee Cinestarts Ki Khoj, Mohit tried his luck in films for few years but destiny had some other plan for him. He found fame with Akbar Birbal Remixed, India's first show for the web and mobile produced by Rajshree Media in 2007. There after he has appeared in many television shows like Love Story (2007), Left Right Left (2008), Bhaskar Bharti (2009), Aise Karo Naa Vidaa (2010), Bairi Piya (2010) and Ek Mutthi Aasmaan (2013/14). He appeared in Aapke Aa Jane Se (2018) on Zee TV. He also acted in web series Faceless in 2019 on Jio Cinema. He is currently seen in Shashi Sumeet Production's Tera Yaar Hoon Main since December 2020.

== Filmography ==
=== Television ===
Year	Show	Channel	Production
2007	Love Story	Sony SAB	Anurag Basu
2008	Left Right Left	Sony SAB	DJ's Creative Unit
2009	Bhaskar Bharti	Sony TV	DJ's Creative Unit
2010	Aise Karo Naa Vidaa	Colors TV	DJ's Creative Unit
2010	Bairi Piya	Colors TV	Balaji Telefilms
2013–2014	Ek Mutthi Aasmaan	ZEE TV	DJ's Creative Unit
2018	Aap Ke Aa Jane Se	ZEE TV	Bodhi Tree
2020	Maddam Sir	Sony SAB	Jay Production
2020–2022	Tera Yaar Hoon Main	Sony SAB	Shashi Sumeet Productions

=== Web series ===
Year	Show	Channel	Production
2007	Akbar Birbal Remixed	Rajshri Media	Rajshri Media
2019	Faceless	Jio Cinema	Loneranger

== Awards and nominations ==
Year	Awards	Category	Serial	Result
2013/14	Zee Rishtey Awards	Favorite Pita	Ek Mutthi Aasmaan	Nominated

== Personal life ==
Mohit Daga belongs to a family of agriculture hardware business. He worked for family business before joining films. He is married to Shweta Dagga. Together they have a daughter named Ashwika Dagga. He is trained in kick boxing, martial art and taekwondo.
