= Sunayana Fozdar =

Indian actress (born 1986)

- Born: 19 July 1988 (age 38); Mumbai, Maharashtra, India
- Education: Mary Immaculate Girls’ High School, Mumbai SVKM’s Mithibai College of Arts, kerala
- Occupation: Actress
- Years active: 2006 – present
- Known for: Santaan; Taarak Mehta Ka Ooltah Chashmah
- Spouse: Kunal Bhambwani

Sunayana Fozdar is an Indian television actress. She made her television debut with the show Santaan on Star Plus. She is currently playing the role of Anjali Taarak Mehta in the comedy show Taarak Mehta Ka Ooltah Chashmah on Sony SAB .

== Filmography ==
=== Television ===
Year	Show	Role	Ref
2007–2009	Santaan	Namrata Dixit Jaiswal	
2008	Meet Mila De Rabba	Nikki	
2010	Adaalat	Niyati	
2010	Rehna Hai Teri Palkon Ki Chhaon Mein	Nandini	
2011–2012	Laagi Tujhse Lagan	Sunayana	
2011–2012	Humse Hai Liife	Shona Sen	
2012	Har Yug Me Ayega Ek Arjun	Sandhya Saxena	
2013	C.I.D	Ananya	
2013	Fear Files: Darr Ki Sacchi Tasvirein		
2013	SuperCops vs Supervillains	Various characters	
2013–2014	Qubool Hai	Sameera Farhan Qureshi	
2014	Savdhaan India	Aruna	
2014	Piya Basanti Re	Aditi	
2015	Aahat	Rishi	
2015	Doli Armaano Ki	Simran	
2015	SuperCops Vs SuperVillains	Mishka (Ep: A Tower Of Revenge)	
2015–2016	Yam Hain Hum	Monika	
2016	Agent Raghav – Crime Branch	Gargi Chhada	
2016–2017	Ek Rishta Saajhedari Ka	Priyanka Sushant Sethia	
2018	Belan Wali Bahu	Shalini Awasthi	
2019	Laal Ishq	Sweety	
2020–present	Taarak Mehta Ka Ooltah Chashmah	Anjali Taarak Mehta	
