= The Great Indian Family Drama =

- Genre: Stand-up comedy
- Created by: Abhimanyu Singh
- Country of origin: India
- Original language: Hindi
- No. of seasons: 1

Production
- Producer: Abhimanyu Singh
- Camera setup: Multi-camera
- Production company: Contiloe Entertainment

Original release
- Network: SAB TV
- Release: 3 January – 28 February 2015

The Great Indian Family Drama is an Indian stand-up comedy television series, which aired on SAB TV and premiered on 3 January 2015. The series aired. The show was produced by Contiloe Entertainment. The series was inspired from the daily adventures in the life of a Nawaab.

Due to the fall in the TRP rating of the show, the series went off air in less than two months, on 28 February 2015.

== Cast ==
- Adaa Khan as Host
- Satish Kaushik as Nawaab Jung Bahadur
- Archana Puran Singh as Begum Paro
- Raaj as Sikandar
- Rauf Lala as Shefu, the nosy neighbour
- Navneet Nishan as Mohini
- Shah Faisal Saifi as various characters
