= Romiit Raaj =

Indian television actor

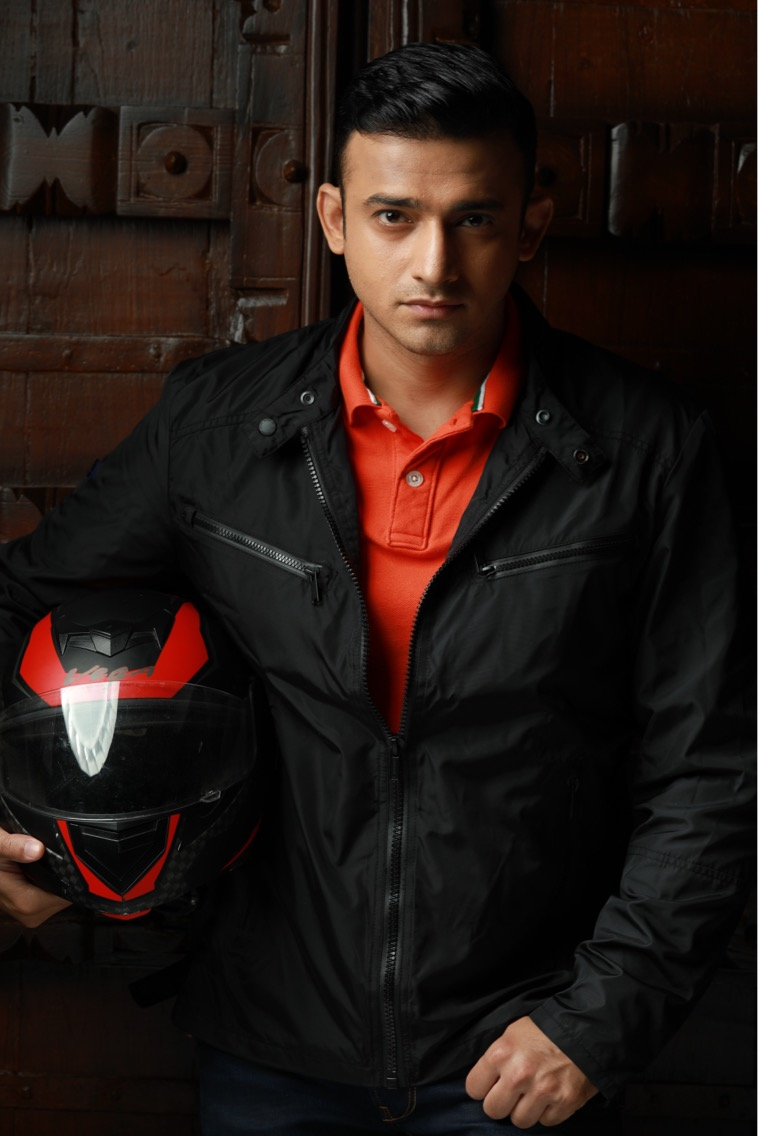
- Born: Romit Raj Parashar; Bhubaneshwar, Odisha, India
- Years active: 2002–present
- Spouse: Tina Kakkar (m. 2010)
- Children: Rehaa Parashar

Romiit Raaj is an Indian actor who started his career in 2002 and has done lead roles on television serials, web series and films.

== Filmography ==
=== Television ===
Year	Serial	Role
2003	Shaka Laka Boom Boom	Karan
2004	Hatim	Prince Vishal
2004	Humdum Film	Sid
2005	Yatra Film	
2006–2009	Ghar Ki Lakshmi Betiyann	Yuvraj Suryakant Garodia
2006	Suno Harr Dill Kuchh Kehtaa Hai	Rahul
2006	Ssshhhh...Phir Koi Hai – Bhoot Bangla	Imran
2007–2009	Maayka	Jeet Khurana
2010	Thoda Hai Bas Thode Ki Zaroorat Hai	Nishikant Kulkarni
2011–2016	Adaalat	Jr. Advocate Varun Zaveri
2015–2016	Chalti Ka Naam Gaadi...Let's Go	Karan Ahuja
2017	Savdhaan India	
2018	Khichdi	
2018	Fear Files	
2018	Kaun Hai?	
2019	Poison	
2019	Kullfi Kumarr Bajewala	Vikram Ahuja
2020	Casino	
2021	Vighnaharta Ganesh	Pandit Shridhar
2022	Yashomati Maiyaa Ke Nandlala	Vasudeva
2023–2024	Baatein Kuch Ankahee Si	Bobby Sood
2024	Yeh Rishta Kya Kehlata Hai	Bobby Sood
2024–2025	Yeh Rishta Kya Kehlata Hai	Advocate Rohit Poddar
2026–present	Anupamaa	Ranvijay "RV" Sood
