= Agent Raghav – Crime Branch =

Indian crime series

- Genre: Crime fiction
- Created by: Abhimanyu Singh
- Directed by: Rajesh Ranshinghe; Govind Agrawal; Arif Ali Ansari
- Creative director: Suryansh Dwivedi
- Starring: See below
- Composer: Dony Hazarika
- Country of origin: India
- Original language: Hindi
- No. of seasons: 1
- No. of episodes: 60

Production
- Producer: Saba Mumtaz
- Production locations: Mumbai, Maharashtra, India
- Camera setup: Multi-camera
- Running time: Approx 45 minutes
- Production company: Contiloe Entertainment

Original release
- Network: &TV
- Release: 5 September 2015 – 10 April 2016

Agent Raghav – Crime Branch is an Indian crime fiction anthology television series, which premiered on &TV from 5 September 2015 to 10 April 2016 for one hour at Saturday and Sunday nights. The series was produced by Contiloe Entertainment of Abhimanyu Singh and starred Sharad Kelkar in the eponymous role of Agent Raghav Sinha, along with Aahana Kumra, Deepali Pansare, Danish Pandor, Jason Tham and Mahesh Manjrekar, the latter appeared in a recurring role. The serial received the Indian Telly Awards in the category of Best Thriller and Horror Show and was also nominated for Best Weekend Show. The show is said to be inspired from the American police drama/mystery television series, The Mentalist.

== Plot ==
Agent Raghav Sinha (Sharad Kelkar) is a handsome guy with a charismatic personality and exceptional skills of observation and deduction. He has a very high IQ and is an expert at reading a person's mind and body language. Raghav picked up these unique skills from his father, who was a renowned psychiatrist. However, at the age of 10, Raghav witnessed his father's murder at the hands of one of his own clients. The killer was untraceable, and even the police had to give up after some time. Ever since then, it has become Raghav's mission to find the killer and avenge his father's death. Raghav was initiated into Crime Branch Special Unit because of his special skills, and he has time and again proved his worth by cracking the most challenging cases and bringing the criminals to justice.

Agent Trisha Deewan (Aahana Kumra) is the leader of the Crime Branch Special Unit. Her goal is to build up her career as a cop but her parents want her to settle down in life by marrying a nice guy. Agent Trisha & Agent Raghav, despite their opposite personalities, fell in love with each other but never voiced this out. Agent Rajbir (Danish Pandor) and Agent Bikram (Jason Tham) are his friends. They share a special bond as well as solving cases. Their goal is to help the team as much as possible using their skills. Dr. Aarti is the forensic scientist working under the CBI. With her forensic skills, she discovers the things may happen on the crime spots. The show also deals about the dynamics shared by Raghav and Trisha, where they both are strongly attracted to each other & share an amazing bond of trust.

In the last episode, it reveals Agent Raghav's father's killer. It is the CBI Crime Branch Chief, Dilip Chauhan. He tries to kill Raghav, but Bikram jumps in front of the bullet and dies. Then the chief escapes and leaves a tired Raghav promising to get him one day.

== Cast ==
- Sharad Kelkar as Agent Raghav Sinha
- Aahana Kumra as Agent Trisha Dewan
- Mahesh Manjrekar as Dilip Chauhan - chief of the CBI Crime Branch
- Deepali Pansare as Agent Gauri, ex Tech Expert
- Danish Pandor as an Agent Rajbir
- Jason Tham as Agent Bikram
- Reena Aggarwal as Forensic Doctor Aarti Mistry
- Swati Rajput as Agent Swati – Tech Expert

=== Episodic appearances ===
- Mamik Singh as Magician Zorrino (Episode 17 & Episode 19 )
- Gautam Ahuja as Young Raghav
- Sara Khan as Radhika
- Payal Rohatgi as Marzena
- Nazea Hasan Sayed as Mihika Rajput
- Deepshikha Nagpal as Devdasi
- Gavie Chahal as Prashant Surve
- Suchitra Pillai as Vasundhara Vohra
- Chestha Bhagat as Sunidhi Vohra
- Alefia Kapadia as Sushma Uppel
- Mitika Sharma as Ritu Sharma, con bride
- Deeksha Kanwal Sonal as Sona / Pooja / Esha / Nandini
- Malini Kapoor as Flavia
- Ridheema Tiwari as Manasvi
- Rishina Kandhari as Dr. Sunaina Sinhal Mehta
- Farhaan Patel as Ratan
- Riaa Chandra as Shruti
- Ayaan Zubairas Rohan Arora
- Sumit Kaul as Subhodh Arora
- Vimarsh Roshan as Randeep Garewal
- Amit Dolawat as Vijay Chauhan
- Ajay Kumar Nain as Inspector Sharma
- Sunayana Fozdar as Gargi Chaddha
- Siraj Mustafa Khan as Roby
- Tarul Swami as Dr.Nigam
- Resha Konkar as Mona
- Gajendra Chauhan as Mr. Bajaj
- Chandan Madan as Ravi
- Ahsaas Channa as Naina
- Seema Pandey as Maya Banerjee
- Ishita Vyas as Gehna
- Rushad Rana as Rocky/ Vineet/Rishabh Tandon
- Sonali Nikam as Akansha Singh
- Akshay Sethi as Sumit
- Ekroop Bedi as Alpana
- Jyoti Gauba as Arundhati Devi
- Aashish Kaul as Mr. Joshi
- Nidhi Jha as Christie Xavier
- Kunal Bakshi as Inspector Srivastav
- Naresh Suri as Marconi
- Rohit Tailor as PSI
- Muskaan Nancy James
- Poorti Arya
