= Saat Kadam =

- Directed by: Mohit Jha
- Starring: Amit Sadh; Deeksha Seth; Ronit Roy; Nivaan Sen; karmveer Choudhary; Saar Kashyap; Akash Mukherjee
- Country of origin: India
- Original language: Hindi
- No. of seasons: 1

Production
- Producer: Sunil Lulla
- Production locations: Mumbai, India
- Camera setup: Multi-camera
- Production company: Eros Entertainment

Original release
- Network: Eros Now
- Release: 24 March 2021

Saat Kadam (English: Seven steps) is a 2021 Indian Hindi-language fictional sports-drama web series. It revolves around the generation gap and the relationship between a father and his son. It stars Amit Sadh, Deeksha Seth, Ronit Roy, Nivaan Sen and Karmveer Choudhary in lead roles.

== Cast ==
- Amit Sadh as Ravi Pal
- Deeksha Seth as Kiran
- Ronit Roy as Aurobindo
- Nivaan Sen as Rajesh
- Karmveer Choudhary as Prakash, team owner
- Akash Mukherjee
- Saar Kashyap
