= Naveen Saini =

Indian television actor

- Born: Delhi
- Occupation: Actor
- Years active: 2001–present
- Spouse: Priyanka Saini
- Children: Navyanka Saini (daughter)

Naveen Saini is an actor who has performed in many Indian television series, including Kaahin Kissii Roz, Sapna Babul Ka... Bidaai, Aise Karo Naa Vidaa, Emergency Task Force, Rishton Ke Bhanwar Mein Uljhi Niyati, Madhubala – Ek Ishq Ek Junoon, Balika Vadhu, Aur Pyaar Ho Gaya, Savdhaan India, Box Cricket League, Code Red, and Aahat. Saini has been active as an actor since 2001.

== Television ==
- Star Plus
  - Kaahin Kissii Roz,
  - Kasauti Zindagii Kay - 2001 Series
  - Sapna Babul Ka... Bidaai and
  - Emergency Task Force
- Colors TV
  - Aise Karo Naa Vidaa,
  - Madhubala – Ek Ishq Ek Junoon,
  - Balika Vadhu,
  - Code Red,
  - Shakti – Astitva Ke Ehsaas Ki
  - Kuch Toh Hai: Naagin Ek Naye Rang Mein
  - Internet Wala Love
  - Pyar Ke Saat Vachan Dharampatnii
  - Krishna Mohini
  - Noyontara
- Sahara One
  - Rishton Ke Bhanwar Mein Uljhi Niyati
- Zee TV
- Gharana
  - Aur Pyaar Ho Gaya and
  - Kundali Bhagya
- Life OK
  - Savdhaan India
- Sony TV
- Crime patrol
  - Box Cricket League and
  - Aahat
  - Ek Rishta sajhedari ka
