= Bitto (TV series) =

- Genre: Drama
- Created by: Abhimanyu Singh
- Written by: Rohit Malhotra; Rajesh Tripathi; Amit Jha
- Directed by: Suraj Rao; Rahib Siddiqui; Govind Agrawal; Shivdutt Sharma
- Starring: See below
- Theme music composer: Sunny Bawra
- Opening theme: "Bitto" by Rajesh Bisen
- Country of origin: India
- Original language: Hindi
- No. of seasons: 1
- No. of episodes: 285

Production
- Executive producer: Somesh Shivraj Chounde
- Producers: Abhimanyu Singh; Rupali Singh
- Editors: Sanjeev Shukla; Dhirendra Singh
- Camera setup: Multi-camera
- Running time: 24 minutes
- Production company: Contiloe Entertainment

Original release
- Network: Sahara One
- Release: 17 May 2010 – 25 March 2011

Bitto is a Hindi language Indian television drama series which premiered on 17 May 2010 on Sahara One. The series is produced by Abhimanyu Singh of Contiloe Entertainment and the story focuses on the prevalent caste-based discrimination in the state of Uttar Pradesh.

== Plot ==
This story revolves around an innocent girl with a life full of hardships. It discovers Bitto's journey of life.

== Cast ==
- Pallavi Gupta / Hritu Dudani as Bitto Tejpratap Singh: Tejpeatap's widow
- Ajay Kumar Nain as Tejpratap Singh: Bitto's husband (Dead)
- Vandana Lalwani as Rajjo
- Mandar Jadhav as Jay
- Vaquar Shaikh as Thakur Pratap Singh
- Pallavi Rao as Sugandha
- Kamalika Guha Thakurta
- Vineet Kumar Singh as Rohan
- Prithvi Zutshi
