= Darr @ the Mall =

- First Teaser Poster
- Directed by: Pavan Kirpalani
- Written by: Pavan Kirpalani; Agrim Joshi
- Produced by: Abhimanyu Singh; MSM Motion Pictures
- Starring: Jimmy Sheirgill; Nushrat Bharucha; Arif Zakaria; Asif Basra; Nivedita Bhattacharya; Shradha Kaul; Neeraj Sood; Josi Hasi
- Cinematography: Gargey Trivedi
- Edited by: Pooja Ladha Surti
- Music by: Songs: Shankar–Ehsaan–Loy; Score: Ranjit Barot
- Production companies: MSM Motion Pictures; Contiloe Entertainment
- Distributed by: SPE Films India
- Release date: 21 February 2014
- Country: India
- Language: Hindi
- Budget: ₹16 crore
- Box office: est. ₹7.8 crore

Darr @ the Mall (transl. Fear @ the Mall) is a 2014 Indian horror film directed by Pawan Kripalani. The film was released on 21 February 2014 and stars Jimmy Sheirgill and Nushrat Bharucha in the lead roles. The film was produced by Multi Screen Media and Contiloe Entertainment.

== Plot ==
A new mall called Amity Mall has opened, owned by Mr. Manchanda (Arif Zakaria) and Mr. Khan (Asif Basra), who claim it to be Asia's largest. The film begins with a security guard speaking nervously on the phone. He appears paranoid and sees a smoky apparition. Terrified, he pleads with it to let him go, but a chase follows. He manages to reach his car, but crashes while driving through the basement ramps. An unseen force kills him by strangling him with the seat belt.

A week later, Vishnu (Jimmy Shergill) applies for the post of head of security at the mall. He is interviewed by Mr. Khan, but their meeting is interrupted by Tischa, the marketing director. Mr. Khan, Mr. Manchanda, Mr. Saini, and Tischa watch a news report about the mysterious death of the security guard. Rumours of the mall being haunted have been circulating due to the unexplained deaths of several workers and staff, making people hesitant to work there. Still, Mr. Khan hires Vishnu, who takes up the job despite the warnings.

While changing into his uniform in the locker room, Vishnu notices the previous guard's locker opening by itself. A file falls out, containing CCTV photographs showing the smoky figure. Later, Vishnu spots someone spying on him, a little girl, but she vanishes before he can question her. Trying to ignore it, he proceeds to the surveillance room with his assistant, Rana. There, they find some spilled jam, which raises Vishnu's suspicions.

Vishnu sends Rana to check the cameras, but in the basement, the storage room door opens on its own. Following orders, Rana investigates but is killed by the same dark presence. Vishnu hears static on his walkie-talkie and goes down to check, unaware that Rana's dismembered body is now stored on a shelf.

During the mall's grand opening, Mr. Khan and Mr. Manchanda tell the media they will spend the night inside with their children to prove the mall is not haunted. However, the same dark force begins attacking them. Meanwhile, Vishnu keeps finding strange objects, like an old box with trinkets and coins, and repeatedly encounters the same girl.

After Mr. Khan's son is killed, Mr. Khan blames Mr. Manchanda and admits they should never have done what they did that night. Eventually, Mr. Khan is also killed by the dark force, leaving only Mr. Manchanda, his daughter Ahana, and Vishnu alive.

As they attempt to escape through the AC ducts, Vishnu is pulled away. He sees the same girl again, who reminds him that his real name is Arjun. They had lived together in an orphanage with 20 other children, located on the same land where the mall now stands. One day, Arjun stole some jam and hid in a cupboard, overhearing a conversation between Mr. Khan, Mr. Manchanda, and the head of the orphanage, known as Mother. They wanted to buy the land, but Mother refused. Soon after, she was killed by Mr. Khan's men, and the orphanage was set on fire. Arjun, the only survivor, had blocked out the traumatic memories.

Vishnu, now aware of his past as Arjun, confronts Mr. Manchanda, who is drawn into a vision of the horrific fire. He dies the same way, consumed by flames, in front of Ahana and Vishnu. When they try to escape, Mother's ghost attacks Ahana and begins to burn her as well. Vishnu begs her to stop, insisting Ahana is innocent. He hugs Ahana, willing to die with her, but seeing his sacrifice, Mother spares them both. She leaves with the spirits of the 21 children in a white light, finally at peace. Vishnu and Ahana walk out of the mall together into the daylight.

== Cast ==
- Jimmy Sheirgill as Vishnu Sharma/Arjun
- Nushrat Bharucha as Ahana Manchanda
- Arif Zakaria as Alok Manchanda
- Asif Basra as Javed Khan
- Nivedita Bhattacharya as Tisha
- Vikram Raj Bhardwaj as KD
- Shraddha Kaul as Mother Madeline
- Neeraj Khetrapal as Sahni
- Yaushika Varma as Mandy
- Anadya Sharma as the little girl
- Geet Sharma as Nanau
- Pramod Pathak as Rana
- Neeraj Sood as Rajendra Solanki, mall security guard
- Charlotte Desmond
- Rahul Mishra
- Vishal Jethwa
- Danish Akhtar
- Amit Roy

== Promotion ==
Darr @ The Mall has done over 8 television show integrations. The movie is promoted on Sony Entertainment TVvia Adaalat, Bhoot Aaya, CID, Fear Files: Darr Ki Sacchi Tasvirein, and on SAB TV via Taarak Mehta Ka Ooltah Chashmah, Chidiya Ghar, and F.I.R. The Official Music Launch was on Boogie Woogie Kids Championship the episode of which aired on 18 January 2014

== Music ==
Darr @ the Mall

Soundtrack album by: Shankar–Ehsaan–Loy
- Released: 5 February 2014
- Genre: Feature film soundtrack
- Length: 23:36
- Label: MSM Motion Pictures

Shankar–Ehsaan–Loy chronology
One by Two (2014)	Darr @ the Mall (2014)	2 States (2014)

The soundtrack of the film is given by Shankar–Ehsaan–Loy, while the lyrics are written by Amitabh Bhattacharya. The album includes three original tracks, one remix track and one instrumental track released on T-Series.

=== Track listing ===
All lyrics are written by Amitabh Bhattacharya; all music is composed by Shankar–Ehsaan–Loy.

Darr @ the Mall
No.	Title	Music	Singer(s)	Length
1.	"Pinacolada" (Remix)	Additional programming: DJ Suketu	Aditi Singh Sharma, Neeti Mohan	5:48
2.	"Chaahatein"	Agnel Roman	Sharmistha Chatterjee	4:21
3.	"Tera Reham"		Shreya Ghoshal	4:52
4.	"Pinacolada"		Aditi Singh Sharma, Neeti Mohan	5:19
5.	"Darr Theme"	Ranjit Barot	Instrumental	3:16
Total length:				23:36

== Critical reception ==
DNA India said that The Mall is a spine chilling tale of one night and an encounter with the past.
