= Yashomati Maiyaa Ke Nandlala =

Indian television series

- Genre: Drama
- Created by: Abhimanyu Singh
- Screenplay by: Vikash Pareek
- Story by: Roshni Suvrna
- Creative director: Anish Surana
- Starring: See below
- Opening theme: Yashomati Maiyaa ke Nandlala
- Country of origin: India
- Original language: Hindi
- No. of seasons: 1
- No. of episodes: 128

Production
- Producers: Abhimanyu Singh; Roopali Singh
- Camera setup: Multi-camera
- Running time: 23 minutes
- Production company: Contiloe Entertainment

Original release
- Network: Sony Entertainment Television; SonyLIV
- Release: 13 June – 2 December 2022

Yashomati Maiyaa Ke Nandlala is an Indian Hindi-language drama series produced by Contiloe Entertainment. It stars Neha Sargam, Rahul Sharma and Hitanshu Jinsi in lead roles and premiered on 13 June 2022 and ended its run on 2 December 2022 on Sony TV. It digitally streams on SonyLIV. The show suffered a time slot change from 9 PM to 8:30 PM in August 2022.

== Plot ==
The series is based on the childhood of Shri Krishna narrated in the Srimad Bhagavat Puranam. As the title, it depicts the affectionate relationship between mother and son in a tale based on the Bhagavata Puran.

== Cast ==
=== Main ===
- Trisha Sarda as Grown Up Krishna/Kanha
  - Arya as Baby Kanha/Krishna
- Neha Sargam as Yashoda
- Rahul Sharma as Nanda
- Hitanshu Jinsi as Bhagwan Vishnu

=== Recurring ===
- Romiit Raaj as Vasudeva
- Dinesh Mehta as Bhagwan Shiva
- Reema Worah as Devi Yogmaya, Parvati, Durga, Annapurna
- Piyali Munsi as Devi Lakshmi
- Nimisha Vakharia as Purna Mashi
- Shivendraa Om Saainiyol as Upanand
- ActorsFirdaush as Villager Pandit:
- Suman Gupta as Devaki
- Ram Yashvardhan as Kans
- Preetika Chauhan as Asti
- Neha Tiwari as Prapti
- Gautam Suri as Indradev
- Pradeep Kabra as Asur
- Sukesh Anand
- Sukanya Surve as Rohini
- Samar Ali
- Yogesh Jadhav
- Hemant Bharati
- Rahul Dwivedi (Bhola chacha)
- Rajesh Vijay Salvi As Chaplasur

== Productions ==
=== Release ===
First teaser of the show launched on 20 March 2022 featuring Neha Dubey as Yashoda.

== See also ==
- List of programs broadcast by Sony Entertainment Television
