= Sankat Mochan Mahabali Hanumaan =

- Genre: Drama
- Created by: Abhimanyu Singh
- Based on: Hanuman
- Screenplay by: Reitu Sharma; Niraj Prabhakar; Vikash Babulal Pareek; Himanshu Tyagi
- Story by: BrijMohan Pandey
- Directed by: Manmeet Singh Sodhi; Vicky Chauhan Mukesh kumar Singh
- Starring: Nirbhay Wadhwa; Gagan Malik; Deblina Chatterjee; Arun Mandola
- Theme music composer: Sunny Bawra; Inder Bawra
- Composers: Dony Hazarika; Udbhav Ojha
- Country of origin: India
- Original language: Hindi
- No. of episodes: 631

Production
- Executive producers: Ajay Dhanak; Prarabdha Shrivastava
- Producers: Abhimanyu Singh; Rupali Singh
- Cinematography: Ravi Naidu
- Editor: Rahul Jain
- Running time: 22 minutes
- Production company: Contiloe Entertainment

Original release
- Network: Sony Entertainment Television
- Release: 4 May 2015 – 21 August 2017

Sankat Mochan Mahabali Hanumaan is an Indian-Television drama series that aired weekly on Sony Entertainment Television (India) It tells the story of Hanuman from the viewpoint of Krishna and Rukmini. The series ran from May 2015 to August 2017.

== Plot ==
The series follows the life of Hanuman, and traces his journey from his childhood till the time he meets Rama and becomes his devout disciple to become the hero of the Sanskrit epic the Ramayana.

== Cast ==
- Nirbhay Wadhwa as Hanuman / Vrishkapi
- Gagan Malik as Vishnu / Rama / Krishna
- Deblina Chatterjee as Lakshmi / Sita / Rukmini / Vedavati
- Tushar Dalvi as Valmiki
- Reem Sheikh as Vandevi
- Sheena Bajaj Purohit as Naagin
- Ankur Verma / Arun Mandola as Lakshmana
- Khyati Mangla as Urmila
- Shreshth Kumar / Nishant Kumar as Shatrughna
- Priyanka Shukla as Shrutakirti
- Vikram Sharma as Sugriva / Bhim
- Amit Mehra as Shiva
- Priyanka Singh as Parvati / Navadurga / Adi Parashakti / Tara / Sati / Lalita
- Anju Jadhav as Saraswati
- Aishwarya Sharma / Nidhi Jha as Jambavati
- Sonal Parihar as Satyabhama
- Pooja Khatri as Kalindi
- Saina Kapoor as Mitravinda
- Aishwarya Raj Bhakuni as Kayadhu
- Bharat Chawda / Gagan Kang (Note: Gagn Kang played Kesari and is currently playing Vibhisan after Bharat Chawda made an exit from the show.) as Kesari / Vibhishan
- Barkha Sengupta as Anjana
- Samragyi Nema as Kaushalya
- Alefia Kapadia / Reshmi Ghosh as Kaikeyi
- Kanishka Soni as Sumitra
- Kunal Bakshi as Yuddhajit
- Yogesh Mahajan as Dasharath
- Gajendra Chauhan as Arya Sumant
- Mukul Raj Singh as Angad
- Manoj Verma as Vishwamitra
- Tarakesh Chauhan as Prajapati Daksh / Durvasa

=== Recurring ===
- Lovekesh Solanki as Garuda Dev
- Ankit Bathla as Bharat
- Nishant Kumar as Shatrughna
- Saibal Sandhir as Dhanwantri Dev
- Vikas Grover as Devrishi Narad
- Vimarsh Roshan/ Sandeep Rajora as Surya Dev
- Manas Shah as Devraj Indra
- Preetika Chauhan as Shachi
- Manish Bishla as Vayu Dev
- Pankaj Motla as Arun Dev
- Ravi Kumar as Varun Dev
- Kaushik Chakravorty as Devguru Brihaspati
- Triyug Mantri as Kaal Dev/Yamraj
- Devendra Mishra as Shani Dev
- Sangam Rai as Nagraj punchfan
- Sunil Nagar as Bramhadev
- Ishant Bhanushali as Hanuman (Younger)
- Arpit Gupta as Hanuman (Newborn)
- Ankur Verma as Lakshman
- Shrashti Maheshwari as Tara
- Aarya Babbar/Saurav Gurjar
- Nishkarsh Dixit as Sanatkumara (Note: Saurav Gurjar played the role of Vali and is currently playing Dasanan Ravan after Arya Babbar made an exit from the show.) as Vali/Ravan
- Ram Awana as Kaalnemi
- Vishal Jethwa as Vali (Younger)
- Bhadra Parekh as Sugriva (Younger)
- Ayaan Zubair Rahmani as Prahlad
- Ajay Kumar Nain as Hiranyakashipu
- KK Goswami as Atibala
- Meet Mukhi as Rama (Younger)
- Eklavya Ahir as Bharata (Younger)
- Krish Chauhan as Lakshman (Younger)
- Vansh Sayani as Shatrughna (Younger)
- Aditya Rathore as Jitantak/Ganesha
- Sumit Kaul as Rakshas Chakrasura
- Vinit Kakar as Mahaparshva
- Arpit Ranka as Shatanand Ravan
- Ketan Karande as Ahiravan
- Sharhaan Singh as Meghnath
- Tasha Kapoor as Mandodari
- Paridhi Sharma as Kaikesi
- Riyanka Chanda as Draupadi
- Naina Gupta as Maharani Kishkindha
- Neha Chowdhury as Apsara
- Vishal Patni as Nikumbha
- Zubair Ali as Lavanasur
- Aishwarya Sharma as Jamwanthi
- Ketan Karande as Ahiravan

== International broadcast ==
Sankatmochan Mahabali Hanuman has been telecasted in the following languages:

- Tamil as Jai Hanuman on Sun TV from 5 June 2016 to 7 March 2020
- Malayalam has two dubbed versions
  - Mahaveera Hanumaan on Surya TV from 4 April 2016 to 2018.
  - Mahasakthiman Hanuman on Mazhavil Manorama from 10 December 2018 to 2019.
- Telugu as Sri Anjaneyam on Gemini TV
- Kannada as Jai Bajarangi on Udaya TV from 21 September 2020 to 3 April 2021
- In Thailand, the drama airs on Channel 8 dubbed into Thai as หนุมาน สงครามมหาเทพ.
- In Marathi as *Mahabali Hanuman* on Sony Marathi.
- In Bengali as *Mahabali Hanuman* on Sony AATH.
- In Odia as *Sankata Mochana Mahabali Hanuman* on Tarang TV.
- In Tamil as Veera Anjaneya on Thanthi One from 19 May 2024-Present.
