= Adaalat (TV series) =

Indian television courtroom drama (2010-2016)

- Genre: Courtroom drama
- Created by: Abhimanyu Singh
- Directed by: Udayan Pradeep Shukla; Suleman Quadri; Rajesh Ranshing; Pratyush Athavale; Amitabh Raina; Pawan Kaul; Rajan Waghdhare
- Creative directors: Chirag Shah; Niraj Kumar Mishra; Amitabh Raina; Sancheeta Bose
- Starring: Ronit Roy; Anand Goradia; Romit Raj; Shraman Jain; Sunayana Fozdar
- Country of origin: India
- Original language: Hindi
- No. of seasons: 2
- No. of episodes: 457

Production
- Producers: Abhimanyuh Singh; Rupali Singh
- Running time: 45 minutes
- Production company: Contiloe Entertainment

Original release
- Network: Sony Entertainment Television
- Release: 20 November 2010 – 4 September 2016

Adaalat (transl. The Court) is an Indian television courtroom drama anthology series about a defence attorney, K. D. Pathak (Karanveer Damyanti Pathak), portrayed by Ronit Roy. The first season of the show premiered on Sony Entertainment Television on 20 November 2010 and ran for five years, ending on 11 July 2015. The show aired 431 episodes in its first season. Adaalat returned for its second season on Sony Entertainment Television on 4 June 2016 and ended on 4 September 2016. The show aired 26 episodes in its second season.

== Synopsis ==
Adaalat follows K.D. Pathak, a defence lawyer known for his sharp intellect and unconventional methods in the courtroom. The series centres on his efforts to defend clients accused of serious crimes, often taking on cases that appear to be hopeless.

K.D. is characterised by his analytical thinking, attention to detail, and commitment to uncovering the truth. Each episode typically presents a self-contained case in which he exposes flaws in the prosecution's arguments and identifies the real culprit. While he uses creative strategies and at times employs theatrical courtroom demonstrations, his ultimate goal is to ensure that justice prevails rather than simply securing acquittals.

== Cast ==
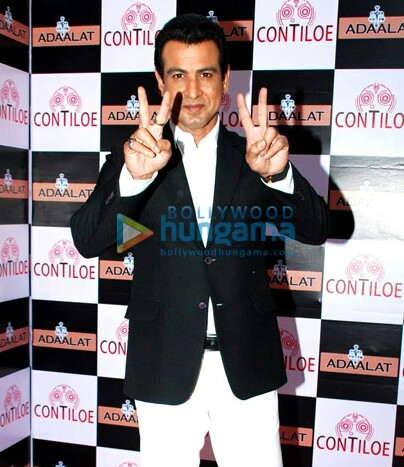
Ronit Roy who played the role of K.D. Pathak

=== Main ===
- Ronit Roy as Advocate K.D. Pathak/Karan Divakar Pathak
- Romit Raj as Varun Zaveri, K.D.'s Assistant
- Shraman Jain as Shraman, K.D.'s Assistant
- Prerna Wanvari as Sunaina, K.D.'s Assistant
- Sunayana Fozdar as Niyati Sharma, K.D.'s Assistant
- Tithi Raaj as Adhira, K.D.'s Assistant
- Niloufer as Mrs. Billimoria, K.D.'s Secretary
- Ajay Kumar Nain as Inspector Shrikant Dave

=== Recurring ===
- Anand Goradia in a double role as
  - Public Prosecutor Advocate Inder Mohan Jaiswal
  - Expert Company Scuba Diving Head Trainer Yash Mohan Jaiswal
- Mushtaq Khan as Jhilmil Zaveri
- Raja Chaudhary as Inspector Suraj Rathore
- Tina Choudhary as Advocate Maya Phadnis
- Ami Trivedi as Advocate Urmi Dixit
- Shikha Singh as Advocate Anjali Puri
- Sayantani Ghosh as Advocate Pranali Gujral
- Tarun Khanna as Advocate Sudhanshu Jog/ Boxers Tejas Yadav /Arjun Yadav (Note: Tarun Khanna appeared in two episodics; first as twin brother boxers and second as the Public Prosecutor in a later episodes.)
- Vaibhavi Upadhyay as Advocate Rubina Khan
- Sheetal Maulik as Advocate Disha
- Aman Mittal as the Judge
- Iqbal Azad as Advocate Manoj Kumar
- Pratik Dixit as Justice Vishwas
- Kushal Punjabi as Rehan Khan/Advocate Tarun Bakshi/Prosecutor Atul Paranjpe, a psychopathic cannibalistic lawyer who wanted to take revenge from KD for his father's death sentence and got jailed.
- Gaurav Chopra as Advocate /Prosecutor Vishwajeet Ranawat, Kd's law college rival who is ready to throw down KD to become the best lawyer.
- Shweta Kawatra as Advocate Surveen Khurana
- Aashka Goradia as Advocate Meera Thakur
- Vinay Apte as Advocate Meghraj Rane
- Sweta Keswani as Advocate Aarti Keswani
- Karishma Tanna as Advocate Anushka Jaffery
- Rakshanda Khan as Prosuctor/Advocate Pratigya Verma
- Ali Merchant as Advocate Akram Khan
- Manini Mishra as Public Prosecutor/Advocate Devyani Bose
- Pramod Moutho as Advocate Tukaram Avatramani
- Suchitra Pillai as Public Prosecutor Maya Srivastav
- Aashish Kaul as Advocate Rajveer Rathore
- Tushar Dalvi as Advocate Rajnath Salgaonkar
- Rajesh Puri as Public Prosecutor Pramod Jha
- Vishnu Sharma as Public Prosecutor Jaydeep Thakral
- Nagesh Bhonsle as Ex Public Prosecutor Sharad Bhonsle who was found guilty and was in custody.
- Rajesh Puri as Public Prosecutor Viren Prajapati
- Geetanjali Tikekar as Public Prosecutor Suchitra Silwadker
- Sudha Chandran as Public Prosecutor Indrani Singh
- Karishma Modi as Advocate Anita D' Souza
- Rukhsar Rehman as Advocate Rukhsar Rehman
- Ravee Gupta as Public Prosecutor Mitali Basu
- Raj Singh as Public Prosecutor Tarun Mehta
- Achyut Potdar as Judge Ashutosh Manchandani
- Chand Dhar as Judge Chand Kumar Hingorani
- Pradeep Shukla as Judge Rishabh Dhingra
- Ajit Mehra as Judge Naresh Chaudhary
- Rakesh Kukreti as Dhiren Shah
- Navina Bole as Mrs. Dhiren Shah
- Surabhi Prabhu as Maya
- Karmveer Choudhary as Sarpanch
- Sukesh Anand as Mr. Majumdar
- Naresh Suri as Judge Manitosh Vohra
- Azaan Rustam Shah as Bunty
- Kishwer Merchant as Devika, News Presenter (Season 02)

=== Guest ===
- Shivaji Satam as ACP Pradyuman from CID (2010–2014)
- Aditya Srivastava as Senior Inspector Abhijeet from CID
- Dayanand Shetty as Senior Inspector Daya from CID
- Dinesh Phadnis as Inspector Fredricks from CID
- Narendra Gupta as Dr. Salunkhe from CID
- Shraddha Musale as Dr. Tarika from CID
- Janvi Chheda as Sub-Inspector Shreya from CID
- Ansha Sayed as Sub-Inspector Purvi from CID
- Vikas Salgotra as Sub-Inspector Mayur from CID
- Shahab Khan as Shyamchand Shrivastava
- Darshan Jariwala as Karanveer Shekhawat/Mr. Karnal
- Manav Gohil as Abhinav Shekhawat
- Maya Alagh as Damayanti Shekhawat
- Nandini Singh as Meghla Gupta/Kavya/Sukanya Amrish Goel/ Madhura Shroff
- Shahab Khan as Shyamchand Shrivastava
- Manish Goel as Brijesh Rana
- Abir Goswami as Amrit Nagpal
- Eijaz Khan as Anurag Sirohi/Virat
- Rucha Gujarathi as Kajal Bhandari
- Sai Deodhar as Advocate Soundarya Sharma
- Rohit Purohit as Marco D'Souza
- Arun Bakshi as Judge Chandrakant Sareen
- Vindu Dara Singh as Sanjay Bhagat
- Shweta Tiwari as Revati Amrit Nagpal
- Ulka Gupta as Naina Dixit
- Chandan Madan as Anand Mishra (Episode-45)/Toofan (Episode-216 and 217)/Zavisco (Episode-152 and 153) and Divyakant Chatrumukhi (Episode-371)
- Govind Agarwal as Ranjit Das
- Zara Barring as Sheena Chauhan
- Gavie Chahal as Sunil Kamat
- Kushal Punjabi as Rehan Khan/Atul Paranjpe
- Jaya Bhattacharya as Urja Seth
- Divyanka Tripathi Dahiya as Kumud Sharma/Flavia Gomes
- Gufi Paintal as Rattan Lal
- Kamalika Guha Thakurta as Saudamini Patel
- Puneet Vashisht as Goga/Nachiket
- Avtar Gill as Judge Brijnath Goyal
- Rahul Verma Rajput as Abhishek Singh Chaudhary
- Deepali Pansare as Mubina Khatun
- Rupali Ganguly as Public Prosecutor Rohini Mallik
- Vikas Kumar as Senior Inspector Damodar Deshmukh
- Lilliput as Brijesh Kumar (Babloo Joker)/Peter Fernandes
- Hunar Hali as Varsha Rai
- Aditya Kapadia as Mukul Srivastav
- Kajal Pisal as Anjali
- Tarun Khanna as Boxer Tejas Yadav
- Bhavna Roy as Emillie Gomes
- Nirmal Soni as Prince Roody
- Sanjeev Tyagi as Dr. Subhankar Ghosh/Dr. Manish Jhanjhani
- Usha Poudel as Pooja Bhasin
- Navina Bole as Reena Singh
- Neha Janpandit as Varsha Mandge
- Aastha Chaudhary as Riya Malhotra/Nalini Rathore
- Suresh Chatwal as Kishan Chawla
- Bharti Singh as Aarti Sinha
- Vikas Anand as Chief Minister Arvind Rao/Jailor/Swami Durvansh/Judge Munsef Khan
- Raju Shrestha as Abhigyan Rohra/Jaggi Malhotra
- Nimisha Vakharia as Public Prosecutor Mrs. Thakkar
- Sharad Vyas as Judge Prasad Patil
- Chhavi Mittal as Dr. Amrita Bakshi
- Dr. Ved Thappar as Public Prosecutor Vikas Pattanayak
- Mohit Malik as Ankur Lutra
- Manish Naggdev as Rahul Wadhwa
- Vaquar Shaikh as Chandrakant Kohli
- Anupam Bhattacharya as Habibul Mirza
- Neha Saxena as Dr. Shyamali Wadhera
- Salim Shah as Mr. Sodhi/Suhail Rizvi/Prof. Kailash Brahmabhatt
- Dolly Bindra as Sonali (Sweety) Manchanda
- Ashita Dhawan as Advocate Manjula Tripathi
- Raju Srivastav as Raju Chaurasia
- Yash Dasgupta as Sikander Khan/Viraj Anand
- Mihir Mishra as Bob Smith
- Mohan Kapoor as Dr. Prashant Suryavanshi
- Anurag Sharma as Abhay Damle
- Vineet Raina as Debojit Sarkar
- Pankaj Dheer as Dr. Bhaskaran Reddy
- Rushad Rana as Jamshed Jijibhoy
- Vishal Malhotra as DJ Swaroop
- Manit Joura as Sujit Gurumurthy
- Falaq Naaz as Aarya/Maya/Rubiya Hassan
- Leena Jumani as Mihika Gada
- Amit Tandon as Public Prosecutor Rajiv Jain
- Arif Zakaria as Dr. Ashok Paranjpe
- Gajendra Chauhan as Colonel Vikram Desai
- Gulki Joshi as Advocate Swarna Sabnis
- Kurush Deboo as Marz Furniturewala
- Sachal Tyagi as Advocate Bharat Singh Bhardwaj
- Sarwar Ahuja as Santosh Pillai
- Ravi Jhankal as Jardan Singh Solanki/Nawal Kishore Shekhawat
- Amit Pachori as Bhaskar Chaubey
- Raj Premi as Dinkar Bhau
- Shishir Sharma as Public Prosecutor Vidyut Ranawat
- Jayshree Soni as Sanjana Acharya
- Santosh Shukla as Krishna
- Nidhi Jha as Anuradha Sinha
- Bhaskar Pandey as Monty
- Sanjay Swaraj as Dibakar Banerjee
- Ankit Arora as Bipin Khatri
- Amit Dolawat as Chandan Singh/Ranveer Ranjha (RR)
- Sonal Parihar as Anjali Rajput
- Charu Asopa as Anjali Ranjha
- Pooran Kiri as Tiwari Seth
- Manish Khanna as Professor Pranay Dasgupta
- Mandar Jadhav as Abhijeet Malhotra
- Prakash Ramchandani as Kailash Awasthi/Sunil Khanna
- Anoop Gautam as Jatin Sardesai
- Shresth Kumar as Rajat Malhotra/Akshay Talwar
- Akshay Sethi as Joydeep/Gajendra (Note: Akshay also appeared in two distinct roles)
- Rishi Khurana as Bheema Sapru
- Shaleen Malhotra as Jamaal Ahmed
- Amit Behl as Professor Gajendra Mishra
- Simple Kaul as Renuka Niranjan Sahay/Sunaina Amber Agnihotri
- Rishika Mihani as Raashi Chopra
- Chestha Bhagat as Kirti Shah
- Shiva Rindani as Jayant Rao (Dinkar's Henchman)
- Saanand Verma as Chandu Deshmukh
- Prithvi Zutshi as Niranjan Sahay
- Sheetal Thakkar as Pooja Talwar
- Tiya Gandwani as Namita
- Parul Chaudhary as Isabelle Fernandes
- Monica Khanna as Riya Singh
- Rishina Kandhari as Shikha Singh (ATS Head)
- Alok Narula as Ankush Mehra
- Meghan Jadhav as Vicky Mehra
- Hemant Choudhary as Inspector Arvind Singh
- Shahrukh Sadri as Professor Kishore Dixit
- Kishore Pradhan as Yashwant Lohar
- Rishabh Shukla as Siddhant Gurjar
- Jatin Shah as Kunal Srivastava
- Manoj Verma as Sushant Malhotra
- Mayank Gandhi as Ranjeev Menon
- Bhanujeet Sudan as Sanjay Rathore
- Alex Gabriel as Kirk Tyler
- Kunal Bakshi as Jamshed Irani/Satish Tyagi
- Amreen Chakkiwala as Anju Thapar
- Chirag Desai as Vikram/Sathish Khemka
- Bakul Thakkar as Advocate Ashish Lahiri
- Rituraj Singh as Trikon
- Puru Chibber as Tara Singh
- Amit Dhawan as Vipul Sethi
- Malini Kapoor as Aditi Sethi
- Khushboo Tawde as Bindiya Mhatre
- Kishore Pradhan as Yashwant Lohar
- Sharhaan Singh as Aslam Khan
- Ishita Vyas as Rukmani/Meera Bhagat
- Rudra Kaushish as Nilesh Solanki
- Vishal Puri as Shadab Khan
- Abhinav Kapoor as Joy Sen
- Gopal Sin as Zorawar Ansari
- Vimarsh Roshan as Flight lieutenant Tarun Garg
- Sheetal Singh as Priya Bansal
- Aarti Rana as Manda Gada/Pavitra Mehta
- Vineet Kumar as Flight Lieutenant Ajeet Rana/Kishore Verma
- Priya Shinde as Meera
- Sarita Joshi as Kavita Joshi
- Shagufta Ali as Menka Sharma
- Kannan Arunachalam as Advocate Pachauri/Advocate Rao
- Sikandar Kharbanda as Public Prosecutor
- Pallavi Dutt in Episode 358
- Himanshu Soni as Aatish Patil in Episode 218 and 219
- Rishabh Jain as Mr. Zubin
- Jackky Bhagnani
- Jimmy Shergill
- Ravi kumar bs
- Vijay Sethupathi
- Shiva
- Y. G. Mahendra

== Episodes ==
Season	No. of episodes	Originally broadcast (India)	
Season	No. of episodes	First aired	Last aired
1	431	20 November 2010	11 July 2015
2	26	4 June 2016	4 September 2016

=== Season 1 ===
Episode no.	Name	Date of Telecast
1	Super Star Rehan Khan Is Shot Dead	20 November 2010
2	Namdev Bank Robbery Case	27 November 2010
3	CID Officer Abhijeet Adaalat Mein (CID Officer Abhijeet in Court) (Crossover episode with CID episode 677 – Abhijeet in Jail)	4 December 2010
4	Neend Ki Bimari Ya Qatl Ka Bahana (Sleeping Disease or a Killing Act)	11 December 2010
5	Jaadugar Ki Khooni Talwaar (The Killer Sword of a Magician)	18 December 2010
6	KD Ki Jung Supreme Court Mein (KD's Fight in Supreme Court)	25 December 2010
7	Qatl Ka Khel (Game of Murder)	1 January 2011
8	Mukhyamantri Ka Qatil Kaun? (Who is the Chief Minister's Killer?)	8 January 2011
9	Jhooth Ka Sach (A Lie's Truth)	15 January 2011
10	Wafadaar Kutte Tintin Ka Bayaan (A Loyal Dog Tintin's Statement)	22 January 2011
11	Circus Mein Qatil Kaun? (Who is the Killer in the circus?)	29 January 2011
12	Qatil Aatma Adaalat Mein (A Deadly Spirit in the Court)	5 February 2011
13	Qatil Pyaar (Killer Love)	12 February 2011
14	Qatil Boxer (Killer Boxer)	19 February 2011
15	Theatre Mein Qatl (Murder in a Theater)	26 February 2011
16	Giant Wheel Par Qatl (Murder on a Giant Wheel)	6 March 2011
17	KD Pathak Zinda Daffan (KD Pathak Buried Alive)	12 March 2011
18	345 Kilo Ka Qatil (Killer weighing 345 kg)	19 March 2011
19	Gumnaam Qatil (Unknown Killer)	26 March 2011
20	KD Pathak Jail Mein (KD Pathak in Jail)	2 April 2011
21	Lift Mein Qatl (Murder in Lift)	9 April 2011
22	Qatil Murti (Killer Statue)	16 April 2011
23	Iqbal-E-Jurm (Confession)	23 April 2011
24	Begunaah Ghode Ka Kissa (An Innocent Horse's Story)	30 April 2011
25	Jalpari (Mermaid)	7 May 2011
26	Raaton Ka Raja Saamri (Saamri – The King of Night)	14 May 2011
27	Kissa Don Ke Khoon Ka (The Case of a Don's Murder)	21 May 2011
28	Flat Mein Qatl (Murder in a Flat)	28 May 2011
29	Killed During Marathon	4 June 2011
30	Kissa Builder Ke Qatl Ka (The Case of a Builder's Murder)	11 June 2011
31	KD V/s KD	18 June 2011
32	KD V/s KD	19 June 2011
33	Maut Ka Pyaala (Bowl of Death)	25 June 2011
34	Samundar Mein Khoon (Murder in the Sea)	26 June 2011
35	Raaz Angry Colonel Ke Khoon Ka (The Secret of an Angry Colonel's Murder)	2 July 2011
36	Super Model Ki Hatya Ka Kissa (The Case of a Super Model's Murder)	3 July 2011
37	Qatil Kaun (Who is the Killer)	9 July 2011
38	Qatil Kaun (Who is the Killer)	10 July 2011
39	Khoon Ki Dastak (Murder's Knock)	16 July 2011
40	Khoon Ka Rishta (Bond of Blood)	17 July 2011
41	KD Pathak Ko Chunauti (Challenge to KD Pathak)	23 July 2011
42	Kissa Hostel Suicide Ka (The Case of the Hostel Suicide)	24 July 2011
43	Pyaar Ke Naam Qatl-E-Aam (Murder in the Name of Love)	30 July 2011
44	Murdaghar Khoon Ka Raaz (The Secret of the Mortuary Murder)	31 July 2011
45	Kissa Qatil Shekhar Ka (The Case of Killer Shekhar)	6 August 2011
46	Comedian Ya Qatil? (Comedian or Killer?)	7 August 2011
47	Kissa CM Ki Secret List Ka (The Case of the CM's Secret List)	13 August 2011
48	Kissa CM Ki Secret List Ka (The Case of the CM's Secret List)	14 August 2011
49	Masoom Gavah (Innocent Witness)	20 August 2011
50	Masoom Gavah (Innocent Witness)	21 August 2011
51	Letter Bomb Murder	27 August 2011
52	Chashmadeed Gavah Tota (Parrot Eyewitness)	28 August 2011
53	Kissa Taxi Murder Ka (The Case of the Taxi Murder)	3 September 2011
54	Shradha 50	4 September 2011
55	Mystery of the Alarm Clock	10 September 2011
56	KD in Ahmedabad	11 September 2011
57	Pyaar Ya Insaaf (Love or Justice)	17 September 2011
58	Pyaar Ya Insaaf (Love or Justice)	18 September 2011
59	Black Magic Murder	24 September 2011
60	Black Magic Murder	25 September 2011
61	Double Death	1 October 2011
62	Jhoota Qatil (False Killer)	2 October 2011
63	Ramleela Mein Qatl (Murder in Ramayan Play)	8 October 2011
64	Qatil Dandiya Night (Killer Dandiya Night)	9 October 2011
65	Raaz Chauthe Chor Ka (The Secret of the Fourth Robber)	15 October 2011
66	Faraar (Absconding)	16 October 2011
67	Dave Hiraasat Mein (Dave in Custody)	22 October 2011
68	Dave Hiraasat Mein (Dave in Custody)	23 October 2011
69	Zindagi Milegi Dobara (I Will Get Life Again)	29 October 2011
70	Zindagi Milegi Dobara (I Will Get Life Again)	30 October 2011
71	Khoon Ka Jaal (Web of Death)	5 November 2011
72	Tunnel Mein Khoon (Murder in a Tunnel)	6 November 2011
73	Dohri Uljhan (Double Trouble)	12 November 2011
74	Dohri Uljhan (Double Trouble)	13 November 2011
75	Waaris (Heir)	19 November 2011
76	Kathputli Ka Khel (Game of Puppets)	26 November 2011
77	Kathputli Ka Khel (Game of Puppets)	27 November 2011
78	Qatil Bawarchi (Killer Chef)	3 December 2011
79	Khel Khel Mein (In Fun)	4 December 2011
80	Naagin (Serpent)	10 December 2011
81	Naagin (Serpent)	11 December 2011
82	Blackmail	17 December 2011
83	Qatil Biker (Killer Biker)	24 December 2011
84	Qatil Biker (Killer Biker)	25 December 2011
85	Qatil Billi (Killer Cat)	31 December 2011
86	Maut Ka Kuvaa (Well of Death)	7 January 2012
87	Qatil Dhrishti (Killer Sight)	8 January 2012
88	Qatil Judi Hui Judwaa (Killer Conjoined Twins)	14 January 2012
89	Qatil Judi Hui Judwaa (Killer Conjoined Twins)	15 January 2012
90	Kissa Honour Killing Ka (The Case of Honour Killing)	21 January 2012
91	Kissa Honour Killing Ka (The Case of Honour Killing)	22 January 2012
92	Kissa Masoom Mujrim Ka (The Case of an Innocent Criminal)	28 January 2012
93	Kissa Masoom Mujrim Ka (The Case of an Innocent Criminal)	29 January 2012
94	Qatil Aghori (Killer Aghori)	4 February 2012
95	Qatil Aghori (Killer Aghori)	5 February 2012
96	Substitute Face	11 February 2012
97	Qatil Chor (Killer Thief)	12 February 2012
98	Ouija Board Ka Khooni Raaz (The Killer Secret of the Ouija Board)	18 February 2012
99	Sky Diver Ke Qatl Ka Rahasya (The Mystery of a Sky Diver's Murder)	25 February 2012
100	Sky Diver Ke Qatl Ka Rahasya (The Mystery of a Sky Diver's Murder)	26 February 2012
101	Haadsa Ya Hatya? (Accident or Murder?)	3 March 2012
102	Haadsa Ya Hatya? (Accident or Murder?)	4 March 2012
103	Khoon Ki Holi (Holi of Murder)	10 March 2012
104	Khoon Ki Holi (Holi of Murder)	11 March 2012
105	Woh Kaun Thi (Who Was She)	17 March 2012
106	Woh Kaun Thi (Who Was She)	18 March 2012
107	KD Ka Saamna Aadamkhor Se (KD's Face to Face with a Cannibal)	24 March 2012
108	Humshakal (Dopplegänger)	31 March 2012
109	Raajneeti (Politics)	1 April 2012
110	Adrishya Qatil (Invisible Killer)	7 April 2012
111	Adrishya Qatil (Invisible Killer)	8 April 2012
112	Andesha Anhoni Ka (Suspicion of Untoward Incident)	14 April 2012
113	Andesha Anhoni Ka (Suspicion of Untoward Incident)	15 April 2012
114	Akhri Fariyadi (The Last Complaint)	21 April 2012
115	KD in Daman	28 April 2012
116	KD in Daman	29 April 2012
117	Waaris Ka Shraap (Heir's Curse)	5 May 2012
118	Waaris Ka Shraap (Heir's Curse)	6 May 2012
119	Iccha Mrityu (Death Wish)	12 May 2012
120	Delhi Mein KD Giraftaar (KD Arrested in Delhi)	19 May 2012
121	Delhi Mein KD Giraftaar (KD Arrested in Delhi)	20 May 2012
122	Target: Varun Zaveri	26 May 2012
123	Target: Varun Zaveri	27 May 2012
124	Inteqaam Suryakiran Ka (Suryakiran's Revenge)	2 June 2012
125	Inteqaam Suryakiran Ka (Suryakiran's Revenge)	3 June 2012
126	Death Prediction	9 June 2012
127	Asli Naqli (Real Fake)	10 June 2012
128	Qatl Ka Akhri Adhyay (The Final Chapter of the Murder)	16 June 2012
129	Qatl Ka Akhri Adhyay (The Final Chapter of the Murder)	17 June 2012
130	Qatal Mankahoor Mummy (Murder Mankahoor Mummy)	23 June 2012
131	Qatal Mankahoor Mummy (Murder Mankahoor Mummy)	24 June 2012
132	Wafadar Bana Qatil (Loyal Turned Killer)	30 June 2012
133	Wafadar Bana Qatil (Loyal Turned Killer)	1 July 2012
134	Qatil Chehra (Killer Face)	7 July 2012
135	Qatil Chehra (Killer Face)	8 July 2012
136	Khoon Ki Kushti (Wrestling of Murder)	14 July 2012
137	CID Virrudh (Against CID) (Crossover episode with CID between episodes 848 & 849)	15 July 2012
138	Public Prosecutor KD Pathak	21 July 2012
139	Public Prosecutor KD Pathak	22 July 2012
140	Murder in Theater	28 July 2012
141	Hatya Ya Hadsa (Murder or Accident)	29 July 2012
142	Maut Ka Saaya (Shadow of Death)	4 August 2012
143	Maut Ka Saaya (Shadow of Death)	5 August 2012
144	Qatil Saas (Killer Mother-in-law)	11 August 2012
145	Qatil Saas (Killer Mother-in-law)	12 August 2012
146	Indradhanush Qatil (Rainbow Killer)	18 August 2012
147	Indradhanush Qatil (Rainbow Killer)	19 August 2012
148	Aakhri Race (Last Race)	25 August 2012
149	Aakhri Race (Last Race)	26 August 2012
150	Chand Par Hatya (Murder on the Moon)	1 September 2012
151	Chand Par Hatya (Murder on the Moon)	2 September 2012
152	Qatil Jaadugar (Killer Magician)	8 September 2012
153	Qatil Jaadugar (Killer Magician)	9 September 2012
154	Dacait Ka Insaaf (A Dacoit's Justice)	15 September 2012
155	Dacait Ka Insaaf (A Dacoit's Justice)	16 September 2012
156	Oh My God	22 September 2012
157	Oh My God	23 September 2012
158	Mental Asylum Mein KD (KD in a Mental Asylum)	29 September 2012
159	Mental Asylum Mein KD (KD in a Mental Asylum)	30 September 2012
160	Maa Mayanti Ka Khooni Khulasa (Mayanti's Killer Revelation)	6 October 2012
161	Maa Mayanti Ka Khooni Khulasa (Mayanti's Killer Revelation)	7 October 2012
162	Rajnaitik Hatyare (Political Killer)	13 August 2012
163	Rajnaitik Hatyare (Political Killer)	14 August 2012
164	Navratri Mein Hatya Kand (Murder in Navratri)	20 October 2012
165	Nakaab Posh Qatil (Masked Killer)	21 October 2012
166	Unjha Ka Shraap (Unjha's Curse)	27 October 2012
167	Unjha Ka Shraap (Unjha's Curse)	28 October 2012
168	Hatyara Robot (Murderer Robot)	3 November 2012
169	Hatyara Robot (Murderer Robot)	4 November 2012
170	Jaiswal V/s Jaiswal	10 November 2012
171	Jaiswal V/s Jaiswal	11 November 2012
172	KD in Jaipur	17 November 2012
173	KD in Jaipur	18 November 2012
174	Ragging Hatyakand (Ragging Murder)	24 November 2012
175	Ragging Hatyakand (Ragging Murder)	25 November 2012
176	Vishkanya (Poison Woman)	1 December 2012
177	Vishkanya (Poison Woman)	2 December 2012
178	Hospital Mein Hatya (Murder in Hospital)	8 December 2012
179	Hospital Mein Hatya (Murder in Hospital)	9 December 2012
180	Voodoo Dolls Ka Mayajaal (Illusion of Voodoo Dolls)	15 December 2012
181	Voodoo Dolls Ka Mayajaal (Illusion of Voodoo Dolls)	16 December 2012
182	X Mas Murder Mystery	22 December 2012
183	X Mas Murder Mystery	23 December 2012
184	Target 1 January 2013	29 December 2012
185	Target 1 January 2013	30 December 2012
186	Sting Operation	5 January 2013
187	Sting Operation	6 January 2013
188	Raazdaar Aankhen (Secret Eyes)	12 January 2013
189	Raazdaar Aankhen (Secret Eyes)	13 January 2013
190	Bhagwaan Ram Hazir Ho (Lord Ram Be Present)	19 January 2013
191	Bhagwaan Ram Hazir Ho (Lord Ram Be Present)	20 January 2013
192	Dost Ka Badla (Friend's Revenge)	26 January 2013
193	Dost Ka Badla (Friend's Revenge)	27 January 2013
194	Dengue Se Rahasyamayi Maut (Mysterious Death by Dengue)	2 February 2013
195	Chalti Gaadi Mein Khoon (Murder in a Moving Car)	3 February 2013
196	Radio Par Live Murder (Murder on Live Radio)	9 February 2013
197	Radio Par Live Murder (Murder on Live Radio)	10 February 2013
198	Judge on Dock	16 February 2013
199	KD Ka Mahayudh (KD's Great War)	23 February 2013
200	KD Ka Mahayudh (KD's Great War)	24 February 2013
201	Adaalat Mein Bhoot (Ghost in Court)	2 March 2013
202	Gawaha Jasoos (Spy Witness)	3 March 2013
203	Hathyari Daayan (Murderer Witch)	9 March 2013
204	Hathyari Daayan (Murderer Witch)	10 March 2013
205	Roller Coaster Par Murder (Murder on a Roller Coaster)	16 March 2013
206	Roller Coaster Par Murder (Murder on a Roller Coaster)	17 March 2013
207	Khwab Mein Hatya (Murder in a Dream)	23 March 2013
208	Khwab Mein Hatya (Murder in a Dream)	24 March 2013
209	Samundar Mein Hatya (Murder in the Ocean)	30 March 2013
210	Samundar Mein Hatya (Murder in the Ocean)	31 March 2013
211	Dehshat Ki Zameen Par KD (KD on the Land of Fear)	6 April 2013
212	Dehshat Ki Zameen Par KD (KD on the Land of Fear)	7 April 2013
213	Maut Ki Guhaar (Plea of Death)	13 April 2013
214	Maut Ki Guhaar (Plea of Death)	14 April 2013
215	The Dwarf Burglar	20 April 2013
216	Jadugar Qatil (Magician Killer)	27 April 2013
217	Jadugar Qatil (Magician Killer)	28 April 2013
218	Khatre Mein KD (KD in Danger)	4 May 2013
219	Khatre Mein KD (KD in Danger)	5 May 2013
220	Junjura Ka Junglee Jungle (Junjura's Wild Jungle)	11 May 2013
221	Junjura Ka Junglee Jungle (Junjura's Wild Jungle)	12 May 2013
222	Atankiyon Ki Saazish (Conspiracy of Terrorists)	18 May 2013
223	Neta Ki Hatya (A Leader's Murder)	19 May 2013
224	Maut Ka Khel (Game of Death)	25 May 2013
225	Patni Ka Badla (Wife's Revenge)	26 May 2013
226	Maut Ki Awaaz (Sound of Death)	1 June 2013
227	KD in Dock	2 June 2013
228	Khamosh Andha Qatil (A Silent and Blind Killer)	8 June 2013
229	Khamosh Andha Qatil (A Silent and Blind Killer)	9 June 2013
230	Barfili Laash (Icy Corpse)	15 June 2013
231	Shrapit Tapoo (Cursed Island)	22 June 2013
232	Shrapit Tapoo (Cursed Island)	23 June 2013
233	Qatil Jinn (Killer Djinn)	29 June 2013
234	Qatil Jinn (Killer Djinn)	30 June 2013
235	Qatil Dayan (Killer Witch)	6 July 2013
236	Qatil Dayan (Killer Witch)	7 July 2013
237	Manav Bhedia (Werewolf)	13 July 2013
238	Manav Bhedia (Werewolf)	14 July 2013
239	Anjaan KD (Stranger KD)	20 July 2013
240	Anjaan KD (Stranger KD)	21 July 2013
241	Qatil Patrakaar (Killer Journalist)	27 July 2013
242	Qatil Patrakaar (Killer Journalist)	28 July 2013
243	Qatil KD (Killer KD)	3 August 2013
244	Qatil KD (Killer KD)	4 August 2013
245	Murder on 15 August	10 August 2013
246	Murder on 15 August	11 August 2013
247	Adrushya Qatil (Invisible Killer)	17 August 2013
248	Adrushya Qatil (Invisible Killer)	18 August 2013
249	Bandh Kamre Ka Raaz (The Secret of the Closed Room)	24 August 2013
250	Bandh Kamre Ka Raaz (The Secret of the Closed Room)	25 August 2013
251	Zehreela Shadyantra (Poisonous Conspiracy)	31 August 2013
252	Zehreela Shadyantra (Poisonous Conspiracy)	1 September 2013
253	Alien Attack	7 September 2013
254	Alien Attack	8 September 2013
255	Khoonkhar Parindey (Dreaded Birds)	14 September 2013
256	Khoonkhar Parindey (Dreaded Birds)	15 September 2013
257	Yeti Ka Hamla (Yeti's Attack)	21 September 2013
258	Yeti Ka Hamla (Yeti's Attack)	22 September 2013
259	Adrishya Maa (Invisible Mother)	28 September 2013
260	Adrishya Maa (Invisible Mother)	29 September 2013
261	Qaatil Makkhi (Killer Fly)	5 October 2013
262	Qaatil Makkhi (Killer Fly)	6 October 2013
263	Electric Man	12 October 2013
264	Electric Man	13 October 2013
265	Kissa Khoi Yaddasht Ka (The Case of Memory Loss)	19 October 2013
266	Kissa Khoi Yaddasht Ka (The Case of Memory Loss)	20 October 2013
267	Aadamkhor Ped (Cannibal Tree)	26 October 2013
268	Kaal Ka Haiwan (Demon of the Dark)	2 November 2013
269	Kaal Ka Haiwan (Demon of the Dark)	3 November 2013
270	Horror Hospital	9 November 2013
271	Horror Hospital	10 November 2013
272	Bhootiya Hostel (Haunted Hostel)	16 November 2013
273	Bhootiya Hostel (Haunted Hostel)	17 November 2013
274	Bhootiya Bungalow (Haunted Bungalow)	23 November 2013
275	Rakh Ka Aadimanav (Primitive Man of Ash)	30 November 2013
276	Rakh Ka Aadimanav (Primitive Man of Ash)	1 December 2013
277	Qatil Pilot (Killer Pilot)	7 December 2013
278	Qatil Pilot (Killer Pilot)	8 December 2013
279	Rakht Pishaach (Blood Vampire)	14 December 2013
280	Rakht Pishaach (Blood Vampire)	15 December 2013
281	Case Kate Hue Sar Ka (The Case of the Severed Head)	21 December 2013
282	Case Kate Hue Sar Ka (The Case of the Severed Head)	22 December 2013
283	Jadui Shakti Ka Rahasya (The Mystery of the Magical Power)	28 December 2013
284	Jadui Shakti Ka Rahasya (The Mystery of the Magical Power)	29 December 2013
285	Ichhadhari Naagin (Shape-shifting Serpent)	4 January 2014
286	Ichhadhari Naagin (Shape-shifting Serpent)	5 January 2014
287	Khooni Patang (Killer Kite)	11 January 2014
288	Khooni Patang (Killer Kite)	12 January 2014
289	Qatil Qaidi (Killer Prisoner)	18 January 2014
290	Qatil Qaidi (Killer Prisoner)	19 January 2014
291	Maayus Joker (Sad Clown)	25 January 2014
292	Humshakal Qaatil (Dopplegänger Killer)	1 February 2014
293	Humshakal Qaatil (Dopplegänger Killer)	2 February 2014
294	Zinda Laash (Living Corpse)	8 February 2014
295	Zinda Laash (Living Corpse)	9 February 2014
296	Darr @ The Mall (Fear @ the Mall) (Promotional episode for movie Darr @ the Mall)	15 February 2014
297	Darr @ The Mall (Fear @ the Mall) (Promotional episode for movie Darr @ the Mall)	16 February 2014
298	Anaconda Ka Aatank (An Anaconda's Terror)	22 February 2014
299	Anaconda Ka Aatank (An Anaconda's Terror)	23 February 2014
300	Khooni Professor (Killer Professor)	1 March 2014
301	Khooni Professor (Killer Professor)	2 March 2014
302	Mumbai Ki Rangeen Duniya (The Colourful World of Mumbai)	8 March 2014
303	Mumbai Ki Rangeen Duniya (The Colourful World of Mumbai)	9 March 2014
304	High Court Bomber	15 March 2014
305	High Court Bomber	16 March 2014
306	Ghoori Dyan	22 March 2014
307	Ghoori Dyan	23 March 2014
308	Rahasya Kale Jaadu Ka (The Mystery of Black Magic)	30 March 2014
309	Masoom Gawah (Innocent Witness)	6 April 2014
310	Antriksh Mein Hatya (Murder in Space)	11 April 2014
311	Rahasyamay Natak (Mysterious Play)	12 April 2014
312	Rahasyamay Natak (Mysterious Play)	13 April 2014
313	Gumnaam Jahaz Ka Rahasya (Mystery of Anonymous Ghost Ship)	18 April 2014
314	Khooni CD (Killer CD)	19 April 2014
315	Khooni CD (Killer CD)	20 April 2014
316	Junglee Manav (Wild Man)	25 April 2014
317	Jaadui Maut (Magical Death)	26 April 2014
318	Jaadui Maut (Magical Death)	27 April 2014
319	Asambhav Qatl (Impossible Murder)	2 May 2014
320	Victoria	3 May 2014
321	Victoria	4 May 2014
322	Shrapit Khanzar (Cursed Dagger)	9 May 2014
323	Shrapit Khanzar (Cursed Dagger)	10 May 2014
324	Murder at Cricket Pitch	11 May 2014
325	Dhundh ka Rahasya (Mystery of the fog)	16 May 2014
326	Dhundh ka Rahasya (Mystery of the fog)	17 May 2014
327	Khatarnak Fashion (Dangerous Fashion)	18 May 2014
328	Khooni Putla (Killer Mannequin)	23 May 2014
329	Khooni Putla (Killer Mannequin)	24 May 2014
330	Khooni Car Ka Rahasya (The Mystery of the Killer Car)	25 May 2014
331	Khooni Panchhi (Killer Bird)	30 May 2014
332	Khooni Panchhi (Killer Bird)	1 June 2014
333	Murda Qatil (Dead Killer)	6 June 2014
334	Yamraaj (Yamaraja)	13 June 2014
335	Yamraaj (Yamaraja)	14 June 2014
336	Khooni Khwab (Killer Dream)	15 June 2014
337	Doodh Ka Karz (Cost of Milk)	21 June 2014
338	Doodh Ka Karz (Cost of Milk)	22 June 2014
339	Rahasya 120 Saal Ka (The Mystery of 120 Years)	6 July 2014
340	Client in Coma	12 July 2014
341	Client in Coma	13 July 2014
342	Hit By Train	20 July 2014
343	Qatil Billi (Killer Cat)	26 July 2014
344	Jaal Tantra Mantra Ka (Trap of Black Magic)	3 August 2014
345	Royal Murder	9 August 2014
346	Royal Murder	10 August 2014
347	Deshbhakt Ya Deshdrohi (Patriot or Traitor)	16 August 2014
348	Room No. 666 Ka Rahasya (Mystery of Room No. 666)	22 August 2014
349	Room No. 666 Ka Rahasya (Mystery of Room No. 666)	23 August 2014
350	Murde Ki Hatya Ka Rahasya (The Mystery of a Corpse's Murder)	29 August 2014
351	Badla Pichhle Janam Ka (Revenge of the Previous Birth)	31 August 2014
352	Killer Guitar	5 September 2014
353	Killer Guitar	6 September 2014
354	Gawah Ya Khooni (Witness or Killer)	7 September 2014
355	Deewana Qatil (Killer Fan)	12 September 2014
356	Deewana Qatil (Killer Fan)	13 September 2014
357	Ek Khoon Char Aaropi (One Murder Four Accused)	14 September 2014
358	Amnesiac Husband	19 September 2014
359	Amnesiac Husband	20 September 2014
360	The Challenger	21 September 2014
361	Nausikhiya Chor Ya Beraham Qatil (Unskilled Robber or Ruthless Killer)	26 September 2014
362	Murder in Lift	28 September 2014
363	Pran Jaaye Par Vachan Na Jaaye (Life May Be Lost But Not The Promise)	5 October 2014
364	Death of a Super Hero	10 October 2014
365	Death of a Super Hero	11 October 2014
366	Shakhchunni	18 October 2014
367	Shakhchunni	19 October 2014
368	Kadghare Mein Judge (Judge on the Box)	24 October 2014
369	Diwali Special	25 October 2014
370	KD Ka Vaada (KD's Promise)	31 October 2014
371	Bolta Puppet (Talking Puppet)	2 November 2014
372	Murder At Play	7 November 2014
373	KD Aur Aatma Ka Rahasya (The Mystery of KD and the Spirit)	8 November 2014
374	Swami Ji Ka Qatil (A Saint's Killer)	15 November 2014
375	Mrs. Billimoria Ka Case (Mrs. Billimoria's Case)	22 November 2014
376	Anokhi Chunauti (Strange Challenge)	23 November 2014
377	KD and the Crazies	30 November 2014
378	Dayan (Witch)	6 December 2014
379	Murder by Latter	7 December 2014
380	Shiv Ka Shraap (Lord Shiva's Curse)	13 December 2014
381	Shiv Ka Shraap (Lord Shiva's Curse)	14 December 2014
382	CID VS Adaalat – Karmyudh (CID VS Court – War of Duty) (Crossover episode with CID)	20 December 2014
383	Resin Attack	21 December 2014
384	Scarecrow	27 December 2014
385	Yaksha	28 December 2014
386	Outhouse Skeleton	4 January 2015
387	Goa Mein Bhootiya Car (The Haunted Car in Goa)	10 January 2015
388	Goa Mein Bhootiya Car (The Haunted Car in Goa)	11 January 2015
389	Lohri Special	17 January 2015
390	Murder Sankranti	18 January 2015
391	The Terrorist	24 January 2015
392	The Terrorist	25 January 2015
393	Spirit of Border	31 January 2015
394	Hunchback	1 February 2015
395	The Evil Twin	7 February 2015
396	Haunted House	14 February 2015
397	Haunted House	15 February 2015
398	The Apartment	21 February 2015
399	The Apartment	22 February 2015
400	The Chatroom	28 February 2015
401	The Chatroom	1 March 2015
402	Bairagadh Ka Pisaach (Pisacha of Bairagadh)	7 March 2015
403	Bairagadh Ka Pisaach (Pisacha of Bairagadh)	8 March 2015
404	The Auto Writer	14 March 2015
405	The Auto Writer	15 March 2015
406	Jurassic Jazeera – Dinosaur Special	21 March 2015
407	Jurassic Jazeera – Dinosaur Special	22 March 2015
408	Trikon The Magician	28 March 2015
409	Trikon The Magician	29 March 2015
410	Yamraaj Qatil (Yama is the Killer)	5 April 2015
411	KD in Trouble	11 April 2015
412	KD in Trouble	12 April 2015
413	KD in Trouble	18 April 2015
414	KD in Trouble	19 April 2015
415	Karate	25 April 2015
416	Samay Kaal Ki Dhaal (Time Gradient)	26 April 2015
417	The Toon Killer	2 May 2015
418	The Hanuman	3 May 2015
419	Manglik	9 May 2015
420	Manglik	10 May 2015
421	Zanolox	16 May 2015
422	Zanolox	17 May 2015
423	Zombie Hospital	24 May 2015
424	Indian Idol	25 May 2015
425	Sleepwalking	31 May 2015
426	Mannequine	6 June 2015
427	Dead Again	13 June 2015
428	Dead Again	14 June 2015
429	Bagh Bahadur (Brave Tiger)	4 July 2015
430	Bagh Bahadur (Brave Tiger)	5 July 2015
431	Bhay (Fear)	11 July 2015

=== Season 2 ===
Episode no.	Name	Date of Telecast
1	Suicide Ya Murder?	4 June 2016
2	Supermodel or Killer	5 June 2016
3	Tantric Trisunis Trap	11 June 2016
4	Builder Murder Case	12 June 2016
5	Hit and Run Case	18 June 2016
6	The Jockey	19 June 2016
7	God Man Satyanand	25 June 2016
8	God Man Satyanand	26 June 2016
9	Kalpana's Ailment	2 July 2016
10	Sixth Marriage	3 July 2016
11	Ashwatthama's Sword	9 July 2016
12	Ashwatthama's Sword	10 July 2016
13	Rahasyamayi Maut	16 July 2016
14	Black Magic	17 July 2016
15	Operation Vijaypath	23 July 2016
16	Operation Vijaypath	24 July 2016
17	Will K.D. Lose?	30 July 2016
18	Janga Devi	31 July 2016
19	Vikrant Is Dead	13 August 2016
20	Pandit Is Dead	14 August 2016
21	Magical Parrot	20 August 2016
22	The Parrot's Revenge	21 August 2016
23	Rose Villa	27 August 2016
24	Rose Villa	28 August 2016
25	Egyptian Mummy	3 September 2016
26	Egyptian Mummy	4 September 2016

== Crossover ==
Adaalat had three crossovers with CID. The first crossover episode aired on both CID & Adaalat on 3 & 4 December 2010. The second crossover titled CID Viruddh Adaalat aired on 14 & 15 July 2012. The third crossover titled as CID Vs Adaalat – Karmyudh aired on 20 December 2014.
