= Kesari Nandan =

- Genre: Drama
- Created by: Abhimanyu Singh
- Starring: See below
- Opening theme: Kesari Nandan
- Country of origin: India
- Original language: Hindi
- No. of seasons: 1
- No. of episodes: 142

Production
- Running time: 23 minutes
- Production company: Contiloe Entertainment

Original release
- Network: Colors TV
- Release: 1 January – 26 July 2019

Kesari Nandan is an Indian social drama television series that aired on Colors TV from 1 January to 26 July 2019. It starred Chahat Tewani, Manav Gohil, and Aastha Chaudhary. The serial was also dubbed in Sinhala as Diriya Doni on Hiru TV.

== Plot ==
Kesari Nandan wants to wrestle to fulfill her father Hanumant's dream. But he believes girls can't wrestle. Kesari fakes being a boy and starts learning wrestling from him. Hanumant is ashamed when people know her truth. Annoyed, he fixes Kesari's marriage to Jawahar, her friend Unnati's brother, who demands dowry. Kesari breaks off the marriage and works hard later when her brother Jagat is paralyzed, Hanumant breaks down thinking his dream will never be fulfilled. In the end, Kesari wins the title of India Kesari.

== Cast ==
- Chahat Tewani as Kesari Nandan Singh: A female wrestler; Hanumant and Madhvi's daughter; Jagat's sister (2019)
- Shivlekh Singh as Pappu: Kesari's friend (2019)
- Manav Gohil as Hanumant Singh: A wrestler; Bhakti's step-son; Zorawar's half-brother; Madhvi's husband; Jagat and Kesari's father (2019)
- Aastha Chaudhary as Madhavi Singh: Hanumant's wife; Jagat and Kesari's mother (2019)
- Shoaib Ali as Jagat Singh: Hanumant and Madhvi's son; Kesari's brother (2019)
  - Aalok Shaw as Child Jagat Singh (2019)
- Dakssh Ajit Singh as Bhairon Singh: Hanumant's friend; Kesari's coach (2019)
- Nivedita Joshi Saraf as Bhakti Singh: Zorawar's mother; Hanumant's step-mother; Jagat and Kesari's step-grandmother (2019)
- Ankit Arora as Zorawar Singh: Bhakti's son; Hanumant's half-brother; Bijli's husband (2019)
- Reshma Shinde as Bijli Zorawar Singh: Zorawar's wife (2019) (Dead)
- Deshna Duggad as Kalki Rana: Suyash's daughter; Hanumant and Madhavi's adopted daughter; Jagat and Kesari's adopted younger sister (2019)
- Ayaz Khan as Suyash Rana: Kalki's father (2019) (Dead)
- Tasheen Shah as Unnati Dunavati: Anand and Namita's daughter; Jawahar's sister; Kesari's friend (2019)
- Mayank Nishchal as Jawahar Dunavati: Anand and Namita's son; Unnati's brother; Kesari's proposed groom (2019)
- Darpan Srivastava as Anand Dunavati: Hanumant's friend; Namita's husband; Jawahar and Unnati's father (2019)
- Anjali Rana as Namita Dunavati: Anand's wife; Jawahar and Unnati's mother (2019)
- Shakku Rana as Police Inspector Aarav Upresh Rao (2019)
- Rajesh Chahar as Chirag Babbar – Jawahar's friend (2019)
- Nikhhil Raaj Khera as ACP Himmat Singh (2019)
- Firoz Ali as Pappu's father (2019)
