= Contiloe Pictures =

Indian production company

Contiloe Pictures Private Limited
- Industry: Entertainment
- Founded: 1995; 27 years ago
- Founders: Abhimanyu Singh; Aditya Narain Singh
- Headquarters: Mumbai, India
- Key people: Abhimanyu Singh
- Website: Official Website

Contiloe Pictures Pvt Ltd., formerly known as Contiloe Films from 1995 until 2008 and Contiloe Entertainment from 2008 until 2015 is an Indian production company. It was founded by Abhimanyu Singh and Aditya Narain Singh in 1995. It has produced successful shows like Jhansi Ki Rani, Adaalat, Bharat Ka Veer Putra – Maharana Pratap, Chakravartin Ashoka Samrat, and Vighnaharta Ganesh.

== Productions ==
Year	Series	Network
2001-2004	Ssshhhh...Koi Hai	Star Plus
2001	Rahen Na Rahen Hum	Star Plus
2002-2004	Krisshna Arjun	Star Plus
2003	Kashmeer	Star Plus
2003-2004	Vikraal Aur Gabraal	Star Plus
2004-2007	The Great Indian Comedy Show	Star One
2004	Majooba ka Ajooba	Hungama TV
2004	Rooh	Zee TV
2004	Aavishkaar - Ek Rakshak	Sahara One
2005	He Man	StarOne
2005-2006	Yeh Dil Chahe More	STAR One
2006	Kuoni Hotspots	Zoom
2006	MTV Ishq Deewane	MTV
2006	Gehre Pyaar Pe Laat	MTV
2006-2009	Ssshhhh...Phir Koi Hai	Star One
2006-2007	Rang Jama De	Zee TV
2007	Agadam Bagdam Tigdam	Disney Channel
2007	SAB Ka Bheja Fry	SAB TV
2007	The Great Indian Love Challenge	NDTV Good Times
2007	Fun on the Run	Zee TV
2007-2008	The Great Indian Love Challenge	NDTV Good Times
2008	Bhaago KK Aaya	SAB TV
2008	Comedy Ka King Kaun	SAB TV
2008	Say Shaava Shaava	NDTV Imagine
2008	Aajaa Mahi Vay	Star Plus
2008-2009	Break Time Masti Time	Disney Channel
2008-2010	Cambala Investigation Agency - CIA	Pogo
2009	Arre Deewano Mujhe Pehchano	Star Plus
2009	Maharshtrache Nach Baliye	Star Pravah
2009-2010	Maniben.com	SAB TV
2009-2011	Jhansi Ki Rani	Zee TV
2010-2011	Bitto	Sahara One
2010-2015	Adaalat	Sony Entertainment Television
2011-2012	Veer Shivaji	Colors TV
2011	Ammaji Ki Galli	SAB TV
2012	Suno... Harr Dill Kuchh Kehtaa Hai	Sahara One
2012-2014	Fear Files: Darr Ki Sacchi Tasvirein	Zee TV
2013-2015	Bharat Ka Veer Putra – Maharana Pratap	Sony Entertainment Television
2014	Emotional Atyachar (season 4)	Bindass
2015	Lage Raho Chachu	Disney Channel
2015–2016	The Great Indian Family Drama	SAB TV
2015–2016	Chakravartin Ashoka Samrat	Colors
2015–2016	Agent Raghav – Crime Branch	&TV
2015–2017	Sankatmochan Mahabali Hanuman	Sony TV
2016	Adaalat (season 2)	Sony TV
2017	Sher-e-Punjab: Maharaja Ranjit Singh	Life OK
2017–2018	Rudra Ke Rakshak	BIG Magic
2018	21 Sarfarosh - Saragarhi 1897	Discovery Jeet
2018	Kaun Hai?	Colors TV
2019	Khoob Ladi Mardani Jhansi Ki Rani	Colors TV
2019	Kesari Nandan	Colors TV
2017-2020	Tenali Rama	Sony SAB
2020-2021	Kaatelal & Sons	Sony SAB
2017–2021	Vighnaharta Ganesha	Sony Entertainment Television
2022	Dharm Yoddha Garud	Sony SAB
2022	Yashomati Maiyaa Ke Nandlala	Sony Entertainment Television
2022–2024	Swaraj	DD National
2022–2024	Tenali Rama	Sony SAB
2025	Chakravati Samrat Prithviraj Chauhan	Sony Entertainment Television

== Movies ==
Year	Film	Release date	Director	Cast	Notes
2009	Maruti Mera Dost	5 June 2009	Manikya Raju	Vindu Dara Singh, Chandrachur Singh, Sushmita Mukherjee, Murali Sharma	
2014	Darr @ the Mall	21 February 2014	Pavan Kirpalani	Jimmy Shergill and Nushrat Bharucha	Co-produced with Multi Screen Media Motion Pictures
2016	Mahayoddha Rama	4 November 2016	Rohit Vaid	Kunal Kapoor, Jimmy Shergill, Gulshan Grover, Mouni Roy	Animated film National Film Award for Best Animated Film
2021	State of Siege: Temple Attack	9 July 2021	Ken Ghosh	Akshaye Khanna, Gautam Rode, Vivek Dahiya, Parvin Dabas, Samir Soni, Abhimanyu Singh	released on ZEE5
