= 21 Sarfarosh – Saragarhi 1897 =

Indian historical television series

- Created by: Abhimanyu Singh
- Directed by: Raj Acharya
- Country of origin: India
- Original language: Hindi
- No. of seasons: 1
- No. of episodes: 65

Production
- Producer: Abhimanyu Singh
- Cinematography: Abhishek Basu
- Production company: Contiloe Entertainment

Original release
- Network: Discovery Jeet
- Release: 12 February – 11 May 2018

21 Sarfarosh – Saragarhi 1897 is an Indian historical drama television series starring Mohit Raina, Prakhar Shukla and Mukul Dev. The show is based on the Battle of Saragarhi, fought between Sikh soldiers of the British Indian Army and Pashtun Orakzai tribesmen. Produced by Contiloe Entertainment, it ran from 12 February to 11 May 2018, on Discovery Jeet.

Netflix acquired the international broadcast rights of the series for 190 Countries.

== Plot summary ==
The series presents a fictionalized depiction of the events leading up to the final battle between the Orakzais and the 36 Sikh Regiment.

== Cast ==
- Mohit Raina as Havildar Ishar Singh, who leads all the Sikhs in the regiment
- Mukul Dev as Gul Badshah, Leader of the Orakzais
- Alexx O'Nell as Captain Winston Churchill, an Officer on Special Duty who introduces the Heliograph to the regiment
- Prakhar Shukla as Lance naik Chanda Singh
- Gaurav Vasudev as Officer Watson
- Shakku Rana as Mahmudullah, a leader of another tribe of Orazkzais, who joins Gul Badshah
- Balraj Singh Khehra as Sepoy Buta Singh, one of Ishar's most trusted men
- Sascha Maximus as Colonel John Haughton, commanding officer of Fort Gulistan
- Luke Kenny as Major Des Voeux, commanding officer of Fort Lockhart
- Danny Sura as Captain Henry Mayne, who seems to show hatred and racism to the Sikhs
- Bhawsheel Singh Sahni as Sepoy Gurmukh Singh, youngest soldier and Teresa's love interest
- Vikram Mastal (Sharma) as Sepoy Balwinder Singh, a wrestler who opposes Ishar and becomes a soldier
- Jaspal Sehgal as Sepoy Bhagwan Singh, who runs an orphanage
- Pippa Hughes as Teresa, a maid in the fort who is in love with Gurmukh
- Sameksha as Jeevani "Sohni" Kaur, Ishar Singh's wife
- Kamaljeet Rana as Sepoy Sunder Singh
- Rahul Ranaa as Sepoy Kala singh
- Jashan Singh Kohli as Sepoy Hira Singh, who has special affection towards Seymour
- Bobby Gill as Sepoy Narayan Singh, Ram Singh's older brother
- Rishina Kandhari as Begum, Gul Badshah's wife
- Suzanne Bernert as Queen Victoria in a special Appearance

== Awards ==
Indian Television Academy Awards

- 2018 - Best Actor (Drama) - Mohit Raina

Indian Telly Awards

- 2019 - Best Actor (Jury) - Mohit Raina
- 2019 Best Actor in a Negative Role(Jury)-Mukul Dev
