= Akbar Birbal Remixed =

Hindi online webisode series

- A promotional logo image of "Akbar Birbal Remixed".
- Created by: Rajshri Media
- Directed by: Siddharth Anand Kumar
- Starring: see below
- Country of origin: India
- Original language: Hindi
- No. of episodes: approx.90

Production
- Running time: approx. 3 minutes

Original release
- Network: Rajshri Media
- Release: 1 July 2008 – present

Akbar Birbal Remixed is a series of Hindi webisodes/mobisodes launched by Rajshri on the Rajshri.com portal on 1 July 2008. Mobisodes of Akbar Birbal Remixed are available in SMS, MMS, video and audio formats. The show will thereafter be made available on the TV, home video and FM Radio.

== Plot ==
This show has been set in the by-lanes of Bhendi Bazaar in Mumbai. The show features the loud and brazen Mumbai Don, Akbar Anna and his intelligent, witty and ever-bankable right hand, Birbal Bhaiya. For this duo, each day brings with it a new nut to crack. Set in a desi Mumbai underworld milieu, Akbar and Birbal regale you with anecdotes of wit and wisdom that will leave you asking for more!.

== Characters ==
=== Akbar Anna ===
Akbar Anna is a Social Worker and self-styled Mumbai Ka King. He has his headquarters located in Bhendi Bazar, Mumbai. He is a chauthi fail candidate whose only principle in life is help the needy and extort the rich. The only thing that he is dead scared in life is his only wife, Naaz.

=== Birbal Bhaiya ===
Birbal Bhaiya is a Shooter, in other words the Troubleshooter in the life of Akbar anna. He has done his masters in M.A. [Masters In Akalmandi] From Jaunpur University. He speaks in with a blend of Hindi and Bhojpuri, in addition to loads of desi English. He is witty, worldly-wise and smart.

=== Lodermal ===
Lodermal is the one who handles the finance in Akbar Anna's gang in other words the king of Hafta Vasooli. He is foolish, impatient and over ambitious.

=== Gaansen ===
Gaansen is the only assistant of Akbar Anna who needs assistance himself. He has only one passion in life that is passion for music. But the only problem is that he is too besura to be a singer.

=== Naaz ===
Naaz is the first lady of Bhendi Bazaar, the only one of whom Akbar Anna is afraid of. She is extremely loving, dominating and demanding.

== Cast ==
- Shahbaz Khan
- Rajesh Jais
- Mohit Daga
- Nivaan Sen
- Hharie Paintal
- Priya Arya
- Yug Italiya
