= Aise Karo Naa Vidaa =

- Genre: Drama
- Starring: See below
- Country of origin: India
- Original language: Hindi
- No. of seasons: 1
- No. of episodes: 165

Production
- Camera setup: Multi-camera
- Running time: Approx. 24 minutes
- Production company: DJ's a Creative Unit

Original release
- Network: Colors TV
- Release: 15 February – 1 October 2010

Aise Karo Naa Vidaa (transl. Don't let me go like that) is an Indian television series that aired on Colors TV in 2010. This show was produced by DJ's a Creative Unit Directed by Talat jani, Khalid Akhtar and starred Aastha Chaudhary and Anas Rashid.

== Plot ==
Reva is a young and innocent village woman who will soon get married. Unexpectedly, she gets raped by Prince Aryaman who is obsessed with her beauty.

The princes' mother, Queen, gets Reva married to Prince Yashvardan, her elder son. The story then follows Reva, as she tries to adjust to the royal family and drown the sorrow of the past, as well as Prince Yashvardhan, who tries to gain the love and trust of his new wife while Aryaman repeatedly plots to separate them and take control over her body in his obsession. The story ends on Aryaman turning a new leaf and reuniting Yashvardhan and Reva.

== Cast ==
- Aastha Chaudhary as Reva Singh: Yashvardhan's wife
- Anas Rashid as Prince Yashvardhan "Yash" Singh: Reva's husband
- Soni Singh as Princess Jyotika "Jyoti" Singh: Yashvardhan and Aryaman's sister
- Kishori Shahane as Rani Maa: Aryaman's mother
- Jaya Bhattacharya as Lakhi: Reva's mother
- Lalit Parimoo as Badri
- Mohit Daga as Sharad: Reva's brother
- Rohit Purohit as Prince Aryaman "Arya" Singh: Reva's obsessed lover
- Sumukhi Pendse as Dai Maa: Aryaman's nanny
- Sunita Rao as Rani Sa: Yashvardhan's mother
- Naveen Saini
- Sushmita Daan
