= Rishton Ke Bhanwar Mein Uljhi Niyati =

Indian drama television series

- Genre: Drama
- Starring: See Below
- Opening theme: Rishton Ke Bhanwar Mein Uljhi Niyati By
- Country of origin: India
- Original language: Hindi
- No. of seasons: 2
- No. of episodes: 829

Production
- Producer: Dheeraj Kumar
- Camera setup: Multi-camera
- Running time: Approx. 24 minutes
- Production company: Creative Eye Limited

Original release
- Network: Sahara One
- Release: 21 January 2011 – 28 March 2014

Rishton Ke Bhanwar Mein Uljhi Niyati is an Indian television series that premiered on Sahara One on 21 January 2011. The series is produced by Dheeraj Kumar of Creative Eye Limited. The show ended on 28 March 2014.

== Plot ==
The story begins when Niyati and Amber fall in love and get married. They face many stormy situations but their love for each other carries them through. Niyati's father became paralyzed due to an accident, Niyati and Amber helps financially, but Vaishali and his husband didn't like this. Niyati's father became a servant at a massage parlour where he didn't know that he is working in sex parlour, once his daughter come to parlour for giving lunch to his father, polices raid in the parlour, where Niyati's father is working, police arrested he and his daughter, Niyati tries to prove his father's innocence, but Amber didn't believe Niyati, time passes Niyati proved his fathers innocence, where his father is leaves the house, after some time Shastri's shifted to the new house, where he faced many problems, after years Niyati pregnant with Amber's child but Vaishali's conspiracy against Niyati is lead to his child's accidentally death coming from Mahableshwar. While traveling to Banglore, Amber meets with in an accident, but he revived and saved by Mr. Rao, Amber's family is shocked by this but Niyati didn't believe that Amber is no more.

Then, Amber loses his memory and start living with Natasha and her family taking himself for being Siddhart Rao (Sid). On the other hand, Niyati is left alone thinking Amber died of the accident. Her mother-in-law not accepting to see her as a widow gives her oath to marry Akash a guy sent by Vaishali to destroy the family. Niyati endures his atrocities and everyone thinks she is mad until she saws Sid and tries to prove that he is Amber but Sid refuse to accept the fact, trusting his now wife Natasha.

Niyati finds that she is pregnant with Amber's child and in excitement she goes to Bangalore where Amber now lives with Natasha's parents. There he refuses knowing Niyati and they insults her. Disappointed Niyati goes away to face an accident where her father saves her. After this incident Niyati decides to come and live with his father at Bangalore determined as ever to get his Amber back.

Time passes and Niyati has a little daughter Anshika (fruity) and Sid and Natasha a son named Krish (Duggu). Niyati now teaches at the school where Fruity and Duggu become best friends. When Natasha finds about Fruity's mom she tries to keep Sid away from the school. But Sid eventually finds that Fruity is Niyati's daughter!

after diwali, Natasha called Niyati that he wanted to meet her, in his pathway amber sees him, and located him, during conversation with Natasa, he pushed himself, sudden amber sees him, and he has gained his all lost memory, Natasha's parents are shocked.

Niyati falls in coma, Amber discharged Niyati take him to his house, which is not liked by his mother in law and Natasha, after several days Niyati gains his consciousness. Amber cares for Niyati which is not like by his mother-in-law and Natasha, Natasha called Niyati that he take cares of his daughter along with Duggu, if he leave Amber and go to his home. During the conversation of Devank, Natasha listened to all the conversation of his and his mindset for killing amber and niyati. Natasha was hit by a gunshot while saving Niyati, back to the Rao house, where he take care of both children. Natasha's mom did not like Niyati, Devang impressed his sister And marry him for devastating Niyati after few days of marriage devang turn evil for Niyati's sister. While trying to save his sister Niyati goes on devang's home and devang hit a glass to Niyati's stomach. After conversation with Amber, Niyati wants a promise that he will take care of both children. Then Niyati died.

After 15 years, amber shifted to Lucknow from Bangalore and Frooti Changed his name to Niyati and become a DSP Officer. Ishwar Sharma a youth leader, Who wants to become the biggest politician of Lucknow, but he comes face to face again and again with (Niyati), Radha (sister of Ishwar) and Duggu (brother of Niyati) become friends. Ishwar and his grandmother want Niyati to become their daughter-in-law under a plan and for this Ishwar has now started trapping Niyati in the trap of his false love. and Niyati started trapping in Ishwar's fake love. Ishwar's mother, aunt and uncle go to Niyati's house to thank her. And sudden Niyati and Ishwar who gone a fake date has come, and all have shock to see him. After going home Ishwar's mother ask Ishwar that does he loves Niyati.

== Cast ==
- Jayshree Soni as Niyati Sharma / Niyati Amber Shastri
- Alan Kapoor / Sachin Shroff as Amber Shastri
- Tabrez Khan as Ishwar Sharma
- Aastha Chaudhary as DSP Niyati Shastri / DSP Niyati Ishwar Sharma
- Parakh Madan as Natasha Amber Shastri
- Garima Anand as Radha sharma (Ishwar's younger sister/Niyati's friend)
- Sachin Sharma as Krishna Sharma (Ishwar's elder stepbrother)
- Khyaati Khandke Keswani as Parvati Sharma (Ishwar's mother)
- Kiran Bhargava as Mrs. Sharma (Ishwar's grandmother)
- Roma Bali as Durga (Ishwar's Aunt)
- Smriti Mohan as Vaishali Shastri
- Simple Kaul as Geet
- Nupur Alankar
- Seerat Ain Alam as Pinky
- Naveen Saini as Durga's Husband
- Susheel Parashar as Mr. Shastri
- Aruna Singhal as Mrs. Shastri
- Veerendra Singh
- Aryamann Sehgal as Devang
- Vaibhav Mathur
- Saurabh Agarwal

=== Special appearance ===
- Dheeraj Kumar as friend uncle (Niyati's uncle)
