= The Great Indian Comedy Show =

- Also known as: The Comedy Show ha ha ha
- Genre: Comedy
- Created by: Abhimanyu Singh
- Country of origin: India
- Original language: Hindi

Production
- Producers: Aditya Narain Singh; Sailesh Dave; Mafuz A. Laskar
- Camera setup: Multi-camera
- Running time: 52 minutes

Original release
- Network: STAR One
- Release: October 2004

The Great Indian Comedy Show is an Indian stand-up and sketch comedy show in Hindi. The program was first aired in October 2004.

Much of the comedy performed in the program includes: Janta Ki Hajamat, Ratan Re-Imburse, Cutting with Jaggu & Tau ke bole. They usually include spoofs of popular movie scenes and other television programs.

== Cast ==
- Ranvir Shorey
- Vinay Pathak
- Sunil Pal
- Gaurav Gera
- Suresh Menon
- Purbi Joshi
- Sonia Rakkar
- Suchitra Pillai
- Howard Rosenmeyer
- Ashwin Mushran
- Kunal Kumar
- Manini Mishra
