= Ayaz Khan =

Indian actor

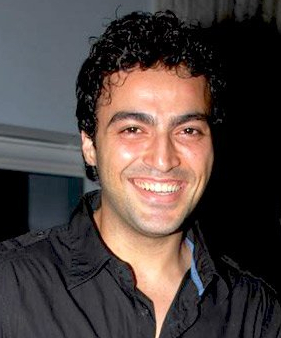
- Khan in 2009
- Born: 1 April 1979 (age 47); Mumbai, Maharashtra, India
- Occupations: Actor, model
- Years active: 2005–present
- Spouse: Amish Khan

Ayaz Khan (born 1 April 1979) is an Indian actor and model. He is better known as Dr. Shubhankar Rai of Dill Mill Gayye on STAR One.

== Career ==
He has appeared in such Hindi films as Jaane Tu... Ya Jaane Na. He played the character of Shubhankar Rai on the STAR One medical drama Dill Mill Gayye. In 2011, he appeared opposite Rahul Bose and Esha Deol in Ghost Ghost Na Raha and started in Apna Sa with Koyel Mullick. He is also part of the cast of Hide & Seek which was released on 12 March 2010. Currently he is playing the role of Gaurav on Parichay on Colors TV.

Khan began working as a model in the late 1990s. He has appeared in over 300 print and television advertisements during his modelling career.

== Filmography and TV shows ==
Year	Work	Role
2005	Bluffmaster!	Amit
2006	Aap Kaa Surroor (Samjho Na Kuch Toh Samjho Na)	Music Video
2007	Kuch Der Tak Kuch Door	Music Video
2007	Dill Mill Gayye	Dr. Shubhankar Rai. Television series
2007	Honeymoon Travels Pvt. Ltd.	Madhu's Boyfriend
2007	Kulvadhu	
2008	Jaane Tu... Ya Jaane Na	Sushanth
2010	Hide & Seek	Imran Baig
2011	Parichay	Gaurav Chopra
2011	Ghost Ghost Na Raha	
2011	Apna Sa	
2013	Punar Vivah - Ek Nayi Umeed	Gaurav
2013	Chashme Baddoor	Major Pratap
2014–2015	Laut Aao Trisha	Kushan Gerewal
2018	Kaisi Yeh Yaariaan	Shrikanth Malhotra
2019	BOSS: Baap of Special Services	Asif
2019	Kesari Nandan	Suyash Rana
2019	Shrimad Bhagwat: Mahapuran	Devraj Indra
2020	Criminal Justice: Behind Closed Doors	Dr. Moksh Singhvi
2022	Kaisi Yeh Yaariaan	Shrikant Malhotra
2023	Scoop	Brij
2024	Visfot	Sagar
2025	Jewel Thief	Manish Ashar
