= Rajshri Media =

Digital media company in Mumbai, India

- Company type: Limited
- Industry: Digital entertainment
- Founded: 1947
- Headquarters: Mumbai, India
- Key people: Rajjat A. Barjatya (Founder)
- Products: Web series Video on demand
- Parent: Rajshri Productions
- Website: rajshri.com

Rajshri Media (P) Limited is a digital entertainment and new media arm of Rajshri Group. The Rajshri.com portal was launched in November 2006 by releasing online Barjatya-produced Hindi movie Vivah, followed by Hattrick, Life in a Metro and Blue Umbrella among others. The company plans to reach its audience through all the four screens: cinema, PC, mobile, TV.

== History ==
On 15 August 1947, Tarachand Barjatya established Rajshri Pictures (P) Ltd., the film distribution division of Rajshri Group. Its first release was Aarti which was followed by the release of Dosti, a non star-cast film. Dosti was presented the National Award for the Best Hindi Film of the Year (1964) and it also won 5 Filmfare Awards.

== Productions ==
=== Web and Mobile TV Shows ===
Rajshri Media has taken initiatives in creating shows for both web and mobile. Akbar Birbal Remixed is India's 1st show for web and mobile. It has in total 90 episodes. The episodes are three minutes in length and are available in SMS, MMS, video and audio formats. The content will be released initially on web and mobile and subsequently formatted for TV, home video and Radio.

=== Video on demand ===
Rajshri Media is also offering Video on demand (VOD) services containing both streaming video and downloadable content to a devices such as a computer, digital video recorder, personal video recorder or portable media player for viewing at any time. The company offers a wide range of genres like animation, TV shows, TV channels and movies.
