= Fear Files =

Indian horror television series

- Genre: Horror; Thriller
- Narrated by: Imran Hasnee; Tanushree Dutta; Nikitin Dheer
- Country of origin: India
- Original language: Hindi
- No. of seasons: 4
- No. of episodes: 437

Production
- Camera setup: Multi camera Single Camera
- Running time: 40 - 60 minutes approximately

Original release
- Network: Zee TV
- Release: 30 June 2012 – 10 February 2019

Fear Files is an Indian Hindi-language horror anthology television series which aired from 30 June 2012 to 10 February 2019 on Zee TV. It was produced by Contiloe Pictures, Essel Vision Productions, Bodhi Tree Multimedia, Dreamzz Images, BBC India, and Shri Jagganaath Entertainment.

== Series overview ==
Season	Season title	Start date	End date	Episodes
1	Fear Files: Darr Ki Sacchi Tasvirein	30 June 2012	13 April 2014	179
2	Fear Files: Dehshat Dobara	19 April 2014	28 September 2014	43
3	Fear Files: Har Mod Pe Darr	25 April 2015	8 November 2015	58
4	Fear Files: Darr Ki Sacchi Tasvirein	22 July 2017	10 February 2019	157
