= List of Kokborok-language films =

This is a list of Kokborok Cinema produced in the Kokborok language.

== Notable feature films: 1980s ==
Year	Film	Director	Ref.
1986	Longtharai	Dipak Bhattacharya	

== Notable feature films: 1990s ==
Year	Film	Director	Cast	Ref.
1993	Langmani Haduk	Ruhi Debbarma	Ruhi Debbarma, Babita Reang, Sukurai Debbarma, Anita Reang	

== Notable feature films: 2004-2009 ==
Year	Film	Director	Cast	Ref.
2004	Mathia	Joseph Pulinthanath	Jayanta Jamati, Meena Debbarma, Amulya Jamatia, Manoj Debbarma	
2008	Yarwng	Joseph Pulinthanath	Meena Debbarma, Nirmal Jamatia, Surabhi Debbarma, Sushil Debbarma	
2009	Ganthi	Kamal Kalai	Rex Debbarma, Juki Kalai	

== Notable feature films: 2010-2026 ==
Year	Film	Director	Cast	Ref
2014	Chethuang	Kamal Kalai	Abhishek Debbarma, Roselin Debbarma	
2014	Kwmajak	Soham Saha	Rinku Debbarma, Hrishie Raj, Surojit Debbarma	
2015	Maari	Sarat Reang	Chayanika Reang, Purbani Debbarma	
2015	Imang	Mrinal Debbarma	Raju Debbarma, Purbani Debbarma	
2015	Bwkha	Sarat Reang	Hrishie Raj, Abhishek Debbarma, Shrabani Debbarma, Rocktim Debbarma	
2016	Nwngbai 2	Sarat Reang	Rex Debbarma, Nisha Debbarma	
2017	Imang 2	Mrinal Debbarma	Abhishek Debbarma, Purbani Debbarma	
2018	Kwtham Kothoma	Sunil Kalai	Shanta Debbarma, Rangoli Debbarma, Dipra Kishore Debbarma, Manoj Debbarma, Rocktim Debbarma	
2026	Khaani	Ploto Debbarma	Ruhi Debbarma, Madhusudan Debbarma, Pohar Jamatia, Ajoy Tripura, Hemchandra Tripura	

== Notable non-feature films: 2017-present ==
Year	Film	Director	Cast	Ref
2017	Haja	Emang Debbarma	Emang Debbarma, Pohor Debbarma, Mombati Reang	
2021	1097	Prajapita Debroy	Tanvi Debbarma, Samrat Debbarma, Rohila Tripura	
2022	Sumuini Khorang	Jacob Tripura	Subhas Tripura, Preity Tripura, Philiksha Tripura, Ajoy Tripura, Gabriel Sakachep, Chandiram Tripura	
