= Jaan Nissar Lone =

Indian musician

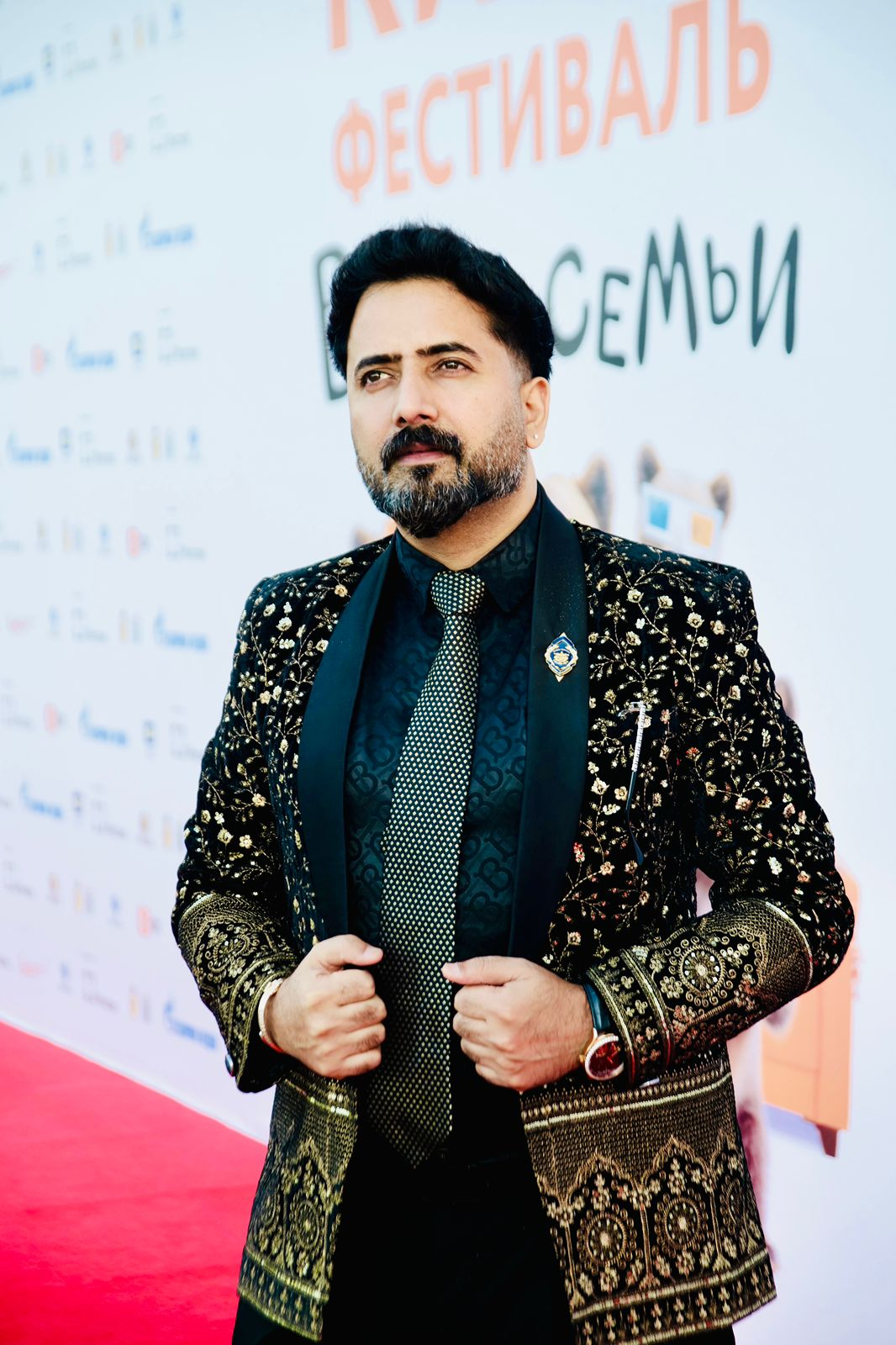

Background information
- Born: 5 October 1987 (age 38); Kashmir,India
- Genres: Pop, classical music, soft rock, retro, world music
- Occupations: Musician, composer, record producer, music director
- Instruments: Guitar, piano, vocals
- Years active: 2010s–present
- Labels: T-Series, Zee Music Company, AR Music Studios, Sony Music India, Worldwide Records
- Website: jaannissarlone.com

Jaan Nissar Lone (born 5 October 1987) is a Kashmiri musician, composer, director, and singer in the Bollywood industry.

== Biography ==
He started film composition with the Hindi film Shudra: The Rising in 2012. He has composed the song "Rubaru" from the Bollywood film Ginny Weds Sunny, which was nominated at the Mirchi Music Awards in the category of best Raga-based songs, along with his track, "Allah Teri Kya Shaan Hai," featured in the film "18.11: A Code of Secrecy."

He established AR Music Studios, producing hits like "Harmukh Bartal," "Salam e Wazwane," "Peer Myanio," and "Dilbaro Portrait of Love."

On the release of "Dilbaro – Portrait of Love," Lone inaugurated another composition, "Asia and Africa – Together We Will Rise and Transcend," in Dubai. He received the title of Ambassador of Peace by the Universal Peace Federation (UPF).

Lone was a nominee for Forbes' 2015 list of the top 100 celebrities in India. In October 2023 he received a doctorate from the International Eurasian University.

Jaan Nissar Lone was the jury of an International Music Contest Intervision Song Contest from India

Jaan Nissar Lone honoured at Global Dialogue on a new World Order for his remarkable work in advancing cultural diplomacy and global engagement

== Global President of BRICS Culture Media Forum ==
In 2024, Jaan Nissar Lone was appointed Global President of the BRICS Culture Media Forum, where he advocates for global peace, cultural exchange, and the United Nations' role in fostering stability.

=== International Film Festival of Jammu and Kashmir ===
In September 2026, Jaan Nissar Lone performed at the inaugural ceremony of the first International Film Festival of Jammu & Kashmir (IFFJK) in Srinagar. He urged artists and creative professionals to use their work to build cultural bridges between Jammu and Kashmir and the rest of the world.

=== World Youth Festival 2026 ===
In September 2026, Jaan Nissar Lone was invited as an expert to the World Youth Festival 2026 in Yekaterinburg, Russia. He was invited to participate in the open dialogue "Universal Language of Creativity: How Global Trends Are Born."

== Discography ==
=== As music director ===
Year	Film	Notes
2012	Shudra: The Rising	All songs and background score
2014	18.11: A Code of Secrecy	All songs
2017	JD	1 song: "Whiskey Soda"
2017	Half Widow	1 song: "Maai Chaanya"
2019	Pranaam	1 song: "Run Ki Hai Dahad & Background Score"
2020	Ginny Weds Sunny	1 song: "Rubaru"

==== Non-film songs and albums ====
Year	Album/single	Song	Music	Lyrics	Singer(s)	Notes
2016	Single	"Peer Myanio"	Jaan Nissar Lone	Peer Zahoor	Sniti Mishra	Kashmiri
2017	Single	"Duchoku Japau Jetiya"	Jaan Nissar Lone	Rajdweep	Rani Hazarika	Assamese
2017	Single	Jugni	Jaan Nissar Lone	Tanveer Ghazi	Jaan Nissar Lone	Hindi
2017	Single	"Naina Huve Bawre"	Jaan Nissar Lone	Sahil Fatehpuri	Rani Hazarika	Hindi
2017	Single	"Khodaya"	Jaan Nissar Lone	Peer Zahoor	Jaan Nissar Lone and Sniti Mishra	Kashmiri
2017	Single	"Katyu Chhukh Nundbaane"	Jaan Nissar Lone	Peer Zahoor	Rani Hazarika	Kashmiri
2018	Single	"DIL TOOT GAYAe"	Jaan Nissar Lone	Sahil Fatehpuri	Kamal Khan	Hindi
2018	Single	"Harmukh Bartal"	Jaan Nissar Lone	Habba Khatoon	Jaan Nissar Lone and Sniti Mishra	Kashmiri
2018	Single	"Tu Hai Kahan"	Jaan Nissar Lone	Tanveer Ghazi	Jaan Nissar Lone and Rani Hazarika	Hindi
2018	Single	'Maenzi Raath"	Jaan Nissar Lone	Peer Zahoor	Rani Hazarika	Kashmiri Mehendi Song
2019	Single	'Khuda Meherbaan"	Jaan Nissar Lone	Tanveer Ghazi	Jaan Nissar Lone	Hindi
2019	Single	'Salam E Wazwane"	Jaan Nissar Lone	Peer Zahoor	Rani Hazarika	Kashmiri Wazwaan Song
2020	Single	"Rouvmut Dildar"	Jaan Nissar Lone	Habba Khatoon	Jaan Nissar Lone and Sniti Mishra	Kashmiri
2020	Single	"Tamanna Dua"	Jaan Nissar Lone	Dr Sohail Nasti	Jaan Nissar Lone	Kashmiri
2021	Single	"Teri Yaad"	Jaan Nissar Lone	Sahil Fatehpuri	Jaan Nissar Lone	Hindi
2021	Single	"Rang Rasiya"	Jaan Nissar Lone	Tanveer Ghazi	Jaan Nissar Lone and Rani Hazarika	Hindi Holi Song
2021	Single	"Tu Hi Paraya"	Jaan Nissar Lone	Tanveer Ghazi	Jaan Nissar Lone	Hindi
2021	Single	"Dil Hi Toh Hai"	Jaan Nissar Lone	Hilal Khaliq Bhat	Jaan Nissar Lone and Rani Hazarika	Hindi
2022	Single	"Baal Maraieyo"	Jaan Nissar Lone	Rasul Mir	Aishwarya Pandit	Kashmiri Sad Song
2022	Single	"Mere Ali Moula Ali"	Jaan Nissar Lone	Nitishwar Kumar	Richa Sharma	Hindi
2022	Single	"Malanga"	Jaan Nissar Lone	Kaushik Vikas	Rani Hazarika	Hindi Sufi Rock
2022	Single	"Wafa Kartam"	Jaan Nissar Lone	Hilal Khaliq Bhat	Jaan Nissar Lone and Rani Hazarika	Kashmiri Romantic Song
2022	Single	"Qarar Rouvum"	Jaan Nissar Lone	Dr Mushtaq Ah. Rather Pathan	Jaan Nissar Lone and Sniti Mishra	Kashmiri
2023	Single	"Dilbaro – Portrait of Love"	Jaan Nissar Lone	Kunwar Juneja and Kashmiri Folk	Jaan Nissar Lone, Rani Hazarika, Ananya Sritamnanda	Hindi Song
2025	Single	"Jaan Wandiyo"		Rahim Saab Sopore	Jaan Nissar Lone	Kashmiri Romantic Song
2025	Single	"Asia and Africa"		Jaan Nissar Lone	Rani Hazarika , Moonaya	English
2026	Single	"Baarish"		Tanveer Ghazi	Jaan Nissar Lone	Hindi
2026	Single	"Zulfia"		Jaan Nissar Lone , Ahmed Ahmedov	Jaan Nissar Lone , Larisa Gadzhieva	Hindi , Russian

== Awards and nominations ==
Year	Awards	Category	Nominated work	Result	Ref(s)
2014	7th Mirchi Music Awards	Best Song Representing Sufi Tradition	"Allah Teri Kya Shaan Hai", from 18.11: A Code of Secrecy	Nominated	
2021	14th Mirchi Music Awards	Best Raag Based Song The year Representing Sufi Tradition	"Rubaru", from Ginny Weds Sunny	Nominated	
