= Shudra (disambiguation) =

Shudra is the laborer and service caste in the Hindu varna system.

Shudra may also refer to:

- Shudra: The Rising, a 2012 film
- Ron Shudra (born 1967), former ice-hockey player

== See also ==
- Sudra (disambiguation)
- Dalit, a group of castes in Hinduism
