= The Tenant (2023 film) =

Film by Sushrut Jain

- Theatrical release poster
- Directed by: Sushrut Jain
- Screenplay by: Sushrut Jain
- Story by: Sushrut Jain
- Produced by: Kanchan Kalra; Daniel Walter
- Starring: Shamita Shetty; Rudhraksh Jaiswal
- Cinematography: Pankaj Kumar; Nuthan Nagraj
- Production company: Mad Coolie Productions
- Release date: 10 February 2023
- Running time: 122 minute
- Country: India
- Languages: Hindi; English

The Tenant is Hindi-English coming-of-age drama film written and directed by Sushrut Jain. It stars Shamita Shetty In Her Comeback and Rudhraksh Jaiswal. It is produced by Mad Coolie Productions. It was released on 10 February 2023. Based on the Italian film malèna 2000. It received mixed reviews from the critics who praised the performances but criticised the screenplay.

== Plot ==
An attractive and bold woman, Meera, moves into a middle-class housing society. The people of the society disapproves and gossip about her lifestyle. She forms a friendship with a teenager, Bharat. Due to Bharat's mistake, her past is revealed to the people. They decide ask her to vacate while a member of the society abuses her and was saved by Bharat. Bharat's parents rebuild their falling marriage.

== Cast ==
- Shamita Shetty as Meera/Sonia Sarai
- Rudhraksh Jaiswal as Bharat
- Sheeba Chaddha as Mrs. Mishra
- Akshat Singh as Pappu
- Atul Srivastava as Bharat's father
- Harsh Mayar as Rocky
- Manish Anand as Ajay
- Divya Jagdale as Bharat's mother
- Swanand Kirkire as Mr. Mishra
- Dayanand Shetty as Detective Daya
- Gracy Goswami as Aparna
- Jayesh V. Kardak as Rajoo

== Production ==
The film was written and directed by Sushrut Jain. It is produced by Mad Coolie Productions. After appearing in 2007 Hindi film Cash, Shamita Shetty returned to the cinema after 16 years with this film. The film is shot in Juhu Sameep in Mumbai where Jain grew up. The film featured songs including James Carr’s "Lovable Girl", Lee Dorsey’s "Hello Mama' and Chris Isaak’s "Wicked Games".

== Release ==
The film was released in Indian Film Festival of Los Angeles in May 2021. The film was released in theatres on 10 February 2023.

== Reception ==
Dhaval Roy of The Times of India rated it 3.5 out of 5. He praised the story, performances and portrayal of "different kinds of friendships". He noted its light music. He criticised "unconvincing" plot points and long first half. Manoj Vashisth of Jagran rated it 3 out of 5. He discussed and praised the theme of feminism and society but criticised the plot. He praised the direction and performances. Rohit Bhatnagar of Free Press Journal rated it 3 out of 5. He praised theme and performances, especially of Shetty. He criticised few scenes and compared the friendship of Bharat and Meera with Ek Chhotisi Love Story (2002). Panos Kotzathanasis of Asian Movie Pulse praised the theme, performances and direction but criticised some plot points. He recalled Malèna (2000) with the similar theme. Sameer Ahire writing for Movie Talkies rated it 2 out of 5. He criticised the screenplay and found it "predictable and tedious" while called the performances "decent". He questioned the motivation and theme behind the film. Manoj Vashisth of Dainik Jagran gave 3 out of 5 ratings.
