= Balika =

Wikimedia disambiguation page

Balika may refer to:

- Balika Badhu (1976 film), a 1976 Indian film
- Balika Vadhu 2, an Indian television series
