= Kokborok Cinema =

Kokborok language film industry

- No. of screens: 2
- Main distributors: SSR Cinemas PVT. Ltd; Shine Film Production; King Films Production

Kokborok Cinema also known as Tripuri Cinema refers to the Kokborok language film industry in Tripura, India and among the Tripuri people. Tripura's Kokborok film industry began in 1986 with Longtharai (1986) directed by Dipak Bhattacharya adapted from Bimal Sinha's novel Karachi theke Longtharai depicting the struggle-ridden life of jhum cultivators in the rural hills of Longtharai followed by the Kokborok film Langmani Haduk (1993) directed by Ruhi Debbarma can be read as a critique of the modern regime. The Kokborok film Mathia (2004) directed by Joseph Pulinthanath, is the first International Award-winning Kokborok film.

== History ==
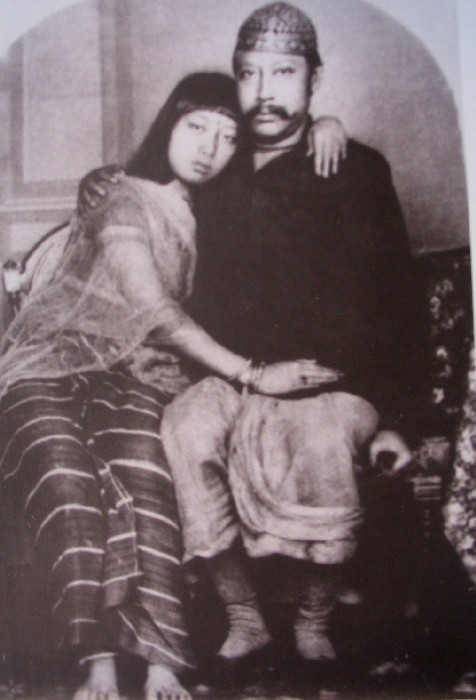
The first Indian woman to practise photography in India; Manmohini Devi

Before it became a recognised form of artistic expression, cinema already existed in Tripura. Its predecessors, such as painting, sculpture, architecture, literature, music, dance, theatre, acrobatics, textiles, and photography, all contributed to the development of cinema. The birth of Tripura's modern era was thus heralded by Maharaja Bir Chandra Manikya (1862–96), a master painter, photographer, composer, scholar of Vaishnava literature, and patron of all artistic endeavours. About one and a half centuries of the royal family's rule saw the continuation of the core musical interests and practises. More so than art or architecture, the Manikya kings of the nineteenth and twentieth centuries were fascinated by literature and music. Upon the death of Maharaja Birendra Kishore in 1928, Maharaja Bir Bikram, who had a passionate interest in theatre and other forms of art and culture, took over as ruler of the realm. Just like his father, Maharaja Birendra Kishore, he was a genius in playing the sitar and esraj. Ustad Munne Khan, Enayat Khan, Muzaffar Khan, Masid Mia, Adam Box, and Ustad Allauddin Khan are among a few well-known artists who have performed in Tripura. Prince Nabadwip Chandra, the father of Sachin Debbarman, who was a well-known music director in the nation, was particularly talented in the musical arts. The first Indian woman to practise photography was Maharani Khuman Chanu Manmohini, Maharaja Bir Chandra Manikya's third consort. She arranged her self-portraits with the Maharaja as a contemporary royal photographer and received training from her husband. She organised photographic exhibitions in the palace where the Maharaja presented self-portraits of both himself and his wife Maharani Khuman Chanu Manmohini. The May 1890 issue of The Journal of the Photographic Society of India focused on the portraits of the Camera Club of the Palace of Agartala. The relationship between Nobel laureate Rabindra Nath Tagore and four generations of Tripuri kings is another important incident in the history of the princely state of Tripura. Understandably, this resulted from Maharaja Ratna Manikya's liberal support of Bengali language and culture by the Manikya dynasty rulers of Tripura (1464–68). In his first letter to Maharaja Bir Chandra Manikya (1862–1896), dated May 6, 1886, Rabindranath Tagore made reference to this familial relationship while searching for historical details about Tripura to draw inspiration for his celebrated book "Rajarshi."

== Notable films: 1986–2022 ==
This section covers notable Kokborok feature films released between 1986 and 2022. Notable films, in this context, include those films which have participated or won awards in national and international film festivals, and the films which have made history (for example, first full-length film, first filmmaker, first color film, longest movie).

Year of release	Film	Notes	Director
1986	Longtharai	First Kokborok Feature Film of Tripura	Dipak Bhattacharya
1993	Langmani Haduk	Kokborok Feature Film of Tripura	Ruhi Debbarma
2004	Mathia	A 2004 Indian Kokborok-language full-length feature film. Awarded as best feature film in the international film festival held in Warsaw 2003.	Joseph Pulinthanath
2008	Yarwng	First Kokborok film to win best feature film award at 56th National Film Awards, awarded by the ex-Indian president Pratibha Patil.	Joseph Pulinthanath
