= Sanjiv Jaiswal =

Indian film director (born 1972)

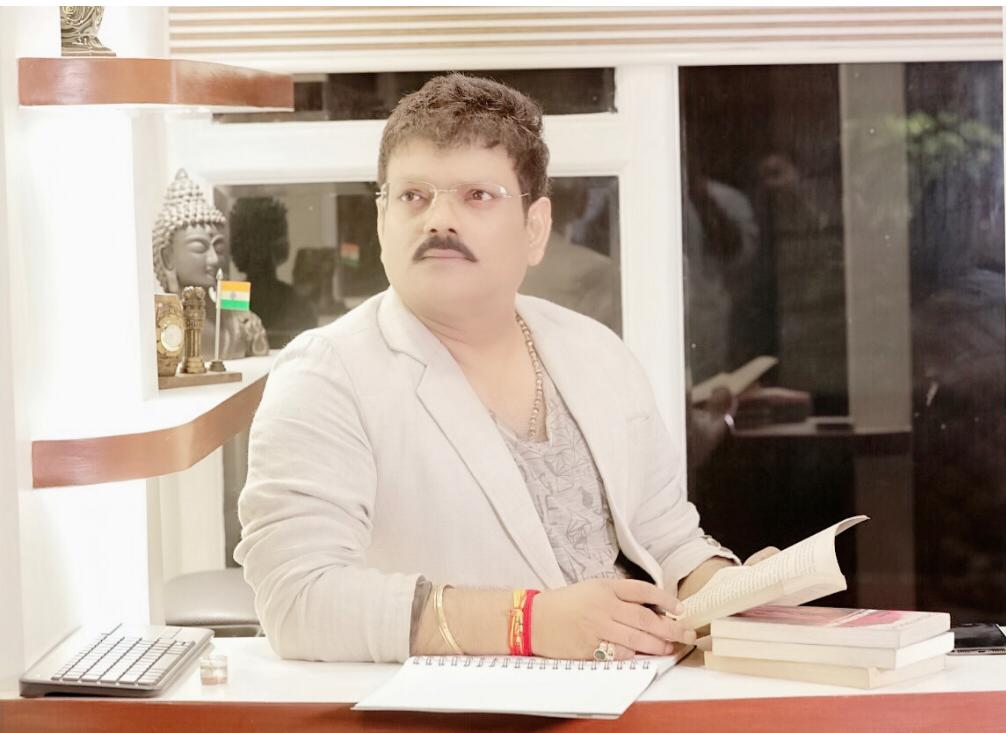
- Born: 6 August 1972 (age 54); Lucknow, Uttar Pradesh, India
- Occupations: Writer, producer & director
- Website: www.sanjivjaiswal.com

Sanjiv Jaiswal is an Indian film director and producer who mainly works in Hindi films.

== Biography ==
Sanjiv Jaiswal is from Lucknow, Uttar Pradesh. He wanted to become a filmmaker since childhood. After completing his graduation, he came to Mumbai and established his own film production house. He produced his first film, Fareb, in 2005. His second film Anwar (2007) was written and directed by Manish Jha. His debut as a writer and director was in 2012, with Shudra: The Rising, which portrays slavery, untouchability and the caste system in Indian society. Jaiswal was awarded the Best Director's Award for Shudra: The Rising in Dada Saheb Phalke Film Festival in 2013. The film was also nominated for the Boston International Film Festival (2013),

In 2019, Jaiswal wrote and directed the Hindi feature film Pranaam.

Filming for Jaiswal's sequel to Shudra: The Rising, called Bagawat, began in 2020.

=== Filmography ===
| Year | Film | Cast | Notes | Production house |
|---|---|---|---|---|
| TBA | Bagawat (upcoming) | Rajniesh Duggall, Vikram Gokhle, Shishir Sharma, Aditya Om, Aham Sharma, Suparna Malakar, Rupali Jadhav, Omkar Das and Krishha. | Writer & Director | Rudraksh Adventures (p) Ltd. |
| 2022 | Quota | Aniruddh Dave, Aaditya Om, Garima Kapoor, Uday Veer Singh | Writer & Director | Rudraksh Adventures (p) Ltd. |
| 2019 | Pranaam | Rajeev Khandelwal, Abhimanyu Singh, Atul Kulkarni, Vikram Gokhale and Sameksha Singh. | Writer & Director | Rudraksh Adventures (p) Ltd. |
| 2012 | Shudra: The Rising | Shaji Chaudhary, Sridhar Dubey, Kirran Sharad and Mahesh Balraj etc. | Writer & Director | Rudraksh Adventures (p) Ltd. |
| 2007 | Anwar | Siddharth Koirala, Manisha Koirala, Rajpal Yadav and Nauheed Cyrusi. | Producer | Dayal Creations (p) Ltd. |
| 2005 | Fareb | Shilpa Shetty and Shamita Shetty and Manoj Bajpai. | Producer | Dayal Creations (p) Ltd. |

=== Webseries ===
| Year | Name | Cast | Notes | Production house |
|---|---|---|---|---|
| Upcoming | Ambedkar - The Legend | Vikram Gokhale | Writer & director | |
