= Bewafaa (2005 film) =

2005 Indian film by Dharmesh Darshan

- Theatrical release poster
- Directed by: Dharmesh Darshan
- Written by: Dharmesh Darshan; Raj Sinha (dialogues)
- Screenplay by: Robin Bhatt
- Produced by: Boney Kapoor
- Starring: Akshay Kumar; Anil Kapoor; Manoj Bajpayee; Kareena Kapoor; Sushmita Sen; Shamita Shetty; Kabir Bedi
- Cinematography: W. B. Rao
- Edited by: Bharat Singh
- Music by: Nadeem–Shravan
- Production company: Sridevi Productions
- Distributed by: Sahara One
- Release date: 25 February 2005
- Running time: 151 mins
- Country: India
- Language: Hindi
- Budget: ₹180 million
- Box office: ₹331.8 million

Bewafaa (transl. Disloyal) is a 2005 Indian Hindi-language musical romantic drama film directed by Dharmesh Darshan and produced by Boney Kapoor. The film stars Akshay Kumar, Anil Kapoor, Kareena Kapoor, Manoj Bajpayee, Sushmita Sen, Shamita Shetty and Kabir Bedi. The music was composed by Nadeem–Shravan.

== Plot ==
Anjali is the younger daughter of her Canadian-born mother and Indian father, living in Quebec. She shares a healthy relationship with her parents and an equally loving bond with her elder sister, Aarti. Anjali develops an attraction toward a budding musician named Raja. Their acquaintance soon turns to love, but Anjali keeps the relationship a secret from her parents, since Raja is not stable in his career and future as yet. Aarti assures Anjali and Raja that she will convince their parents of their true love.

Aarti is married to Aditya Sahai, and the couple is expecting twins. Complications arise during the pregnancy, and Aarti dies while giving birth to twin girls. While in mourning and still unaware of her relationship with Raja, Anjali's parents suggest that she marry Aditya. Although she cannot bear the thought of being with anyone other than Raja, Anjali sacrifices her love for the sake of her nieces, marries Aditya, and moves with her new family to New Delhi.

Aditya, still mourning for Aarti, is a business tycoon who hardly finds time for his sister-in-law-turned wife or his young daughters. Anjali fulfills the role of mother and wife, but cannot bridge the gap between herself and Aditya. She finds herself in a marriage that has no compatibility but only compromises. She stays in the passionless union for the sake of her nieces, whom she now considers her own.

Amidst all this, one day, Raja, who has since become a famous fusion singer, walks back into her life. Anjali feels torn but starts spending time with him. Raja seeks to rekindle their relationship properly, but Anjali cannot forget her husband and her children. Aditya returns from a business trip, and he senses a change in Anjali, which he decides to look into by seeking the help of his friends, a flamboyant couple – Dil and Pallavi Arora. He learns the truth about Raja and Anjali's past and gives Anjali the freedom to choose between Raja and himself. Anjali ultimately chooses Aditya over Raja, not only because of her duty as a mother but also because she realises that she has come to love Aditya. Raja is heartbroken, but he finally has closure, and he leaves to embark on a world tour.

== Cast ==
- Akshay Kumar as Raja Bhosle
- Anil Kapoor as Aditya "Adi" Sahai
- Sushmita Sen as Aarti Verma Sahai
- Manoj Bajpayee as Dil Arora
- Kareena Kapoor as Anjali Verma Sahai
- Shamita Shetty as Pallavi Arora
- Kabir Bedi as Ambarkant Verma, Anjali's father
- Nafisa Ali as Amisha Verma, Anjali's mother
- Supriya Karnik as Manjari "Manju" Sharma
- Navneet Nishan as Anjana "Anju" Sharma

== Production ==
=== Filming ===
Bewafaa was the first movie to be shot in Delhi Metro in November 2003.

== Soundtrack ==
The soundtrack of Bewafaa was composed by Nadeem–Shravan and the lyrics for the songs were penned by Sameer. Singers Lata Mangeshkar, Asha Bhosle, Udit Narayan, Kumar Sanu, Alka Yagnik, Sonu Nigam, Ghulam Ali, Abhijeet, Shaan and Sapna Mukherjee lent their voices for the album. There are 8 songs in the album. The recording of the songs started in 2003 and were completed by mid-2004, as stated by the composers in a 2004 interview. The song "Ek Dilruba" was recorded in two versions by the composers, each representing different situations and different moods in the film. The soundtrack was released in December 2004. According to the Indian trade website Box Office India, with around 25,00,000 units sold, this film's soundtrack album was the year's second highest-selling.

#	Song	Singer
1	"Ek Dilruba Hai"	Udit Narayan
2	"Kaise Piya Se"	Lata Mangeshkar
3	"Ishq Chupta Nahin"	Abhijeet Bhattacharya
4	"Teri Yaad... Yaad... Yaad"	Ghulam Ali
5	"Pyaar Ka Anjaam"	Kumar Sanu, Alka Yagnik, Sapna Mukherjee
6	"Ek Bewafaa Hai"	Sonu Nigam
7	"Kehta Hai Kabootar"	Asha Bhosle, Shaan
8	"Pyaar Ki Raahein"	Shaan

== Critical reception ==
Marc Savlon of The Austin Chronicle gave the film 2 stars out of 5, writing ″The politics of adultery are a hot topic in every culture, but Bewafaa glosses over the most emotionally resonant echoes in favor of rafts of insanely uncatchy songs and a surreal sidestepping of the meat of the story: the cultural conventions that require Anjali to marry her late sister's husband, an ultra-reserved businessman who sees the shade of his dead wife wherever he looks. It's like Britney Spears marrying Wally Shawn. Come to think of it, there's a movie in there somewhere. Just not this one.″ Anupama Chopra of India Today called the film ″outdated″ and ″old-fashioned in the worst sense of the word.″ Raja Sen of Rediff.com gave a negative review, writing ″Dharmesh Darshan might have a good box-office record, but he has never been a decent director. Here, however, he's made some pure tripe.″
