= Randeep Rai =

South Indian actor (born 1993)

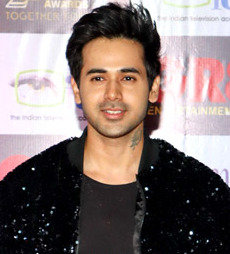
- Rai in 2022
- Born: 8 June 1993 (age 33); Jhansi, Uttar Pradesh, India
- Occupations: Model; Actor
- Years active: 2013–present
- Notable work: Yeh Un Dinon Ki Baat Hai; Balika Vadhu 2; Bade Achhe Lagte Hain 2

Randeep Rai (born 8 June 1993) is an Indian actor who primarily works in Hindi television. He made his television debut in 2014 by starring in Channel V's youth drama O Gujariya: Badlein Chal Duniya. Rai rose to fame through his breakthrough portrayal of Sameer Maheshwari in Sony TV's 2017 romantic period drama Yeh Un Dinon Ki Baat Hai. He was last seen in 2025 as Aryan Kothari in Star Plus's hit series Anupamaa.

== Early life ==
Randeep Rai was born on 8 June 1993 in Jhansi, Uttar Pradesh. He maintained an interest in Hindi cinema from a young age. To pursue opportunities in the entertainment industry, he relocated from Jhansi to Pune for his higher studies before moving to Mumbai in 2013. Prior to making his television debut, he worked extensively as a commercial model, appearing in more than 120 television advertisements alongside prominent industry figures.

== Career ==
Rai started his acting career in 2014 by playing Kabir Scindia in Channel V's O Gujariya: Badlein Chal Duniya, which was followed by episodic roles in Bindass's Yeh Hai Aashiqui, Emotional Atyachar, Channel V's Secret Diaries: The Hidden Chapters, Code Red Talaash, Pyaar Tune Kya Kiya, Tujhse Naaraz Nahin Zindagi, Fear Files: Darr Ki Sacchi Tasvirein and Big F. In 2016, he played Aryan Rathi (the adult Chotu) opposite Shivshakti Sachdev in Star Plus's hit prime-time soap opera Diya Aur Baati Hum. His character was part of the show's generation leap leading up to its conclusion later that year.

From 2017 to 2019, Rai delivered his career-defining performance as Sameer Maheshwari in Sony TV's coming-of age drama Yeh Un Dinon Ki Baat Hai. Set in the 1990s, the nostalgic romance chronicled Sameer's journey alongside Naina Agarwal, played by Ashi Singh, earning widespread praise for its realistic portrayal of teenage love and retro aesthetics. Rai's portrayal earned him widespread acclaim, including nominations for Best Actor Drama (Popular) at the Indian Television Academy (ITA) Awards, while he and Ashi Singh famously won Best Onscreen Couple at the ITA Awards 2019, cementing his status as a household name on Indian television.

Following his breakthrough, Randeep Rai expanded his footprint into films, web series and music videos. He made a cameo appearance in the film Pranaam and featured in the romantic comedy film Saroj Ka Rishta opposite Sanah Kapoor, followed by web projects such asVirgin Suspect. He made an episodic appearance in Dangal TV's crime anthology India Alert and joined the cast of ALTBalaji's Pavitra Rishta 2 alongside Shaheer Sheikh. In addition to acting across media, he has featured in several popular music videos, including Dil Tujhko Chahe opposite Ashi Singh and Mana Sakda Hai with Ashnoor Kaur.

In November 2021, Rai returned to prime-time television in Colors TV's social drama Balika Vadhu 2 stepping into the role of adult Anand Rawal opposite Shivangi Joshi following the show's generational leap. In 2022, he made a cameo appearance in Zee TV's Meet: Badlegi Duniya Ki Reet as advocate Anurag Rathi. Continuing his streak of major leading roles, Rai joined Sony TV's popular urban romance Bade Achhe Lagte Hain 2 in 2023. He played Raghav Arora - an architect, harbouring a deep, unrequited love for Prachi Kapoor, played by Niti Taylor following the show's 20-year generation leap. Stepping into the franchise, Rai received strong praise for his earnest screen presence and emotional intensity while carrying the narrative forward post-leap.

In 2025, Rai joined the cast of the hit Star Plus series Anupamaa, where he played Aryan Kothari, an emotionally complex, vulnerable character with a troubled childhood and deep-seated resentments. He later featured in the YouTube web series Dooriyan - A Love Story(released via JAR series) alongside Eisha Singh, Kaveri Priyam, and Samarth Jurel.

Progressing to digital micro-drama and short-format pieces, Rai headlined Pocket TV's mini-series The Real Baadshah and starred in The Truth Serum Wife, a comedy-drama for Zee5's Bullet micro-drama app and My Dream Girl on Kuku TV.

== Filmography ==
=== Television ===
Year	Title	Role	Ref.
2014	O Gujariya: Badlein Chal Duniya	Kabir Scindia	
2014	Yeh Hai Aashiqui	Shashank	
2015	Emotional Atyachar	Ronit	
2015	Secret Diaries: The Hidden Chapters	Rishi	
2015	Code Red Talaash	Parth	
2015	Pyaar Tune Kya Kiya	Mohit	
2015	Yeh Hai Aashiqui	Vikas	
2015	Tujhse Naaraz Nahin Zindagi	Shivam	
2015	Fear Files: Darr Ki Sacchi Tasvirein	Ankit	
2015	Big F	Nakul Desai	
2016	Diya Aur Baati Hum	Aryan Rathi	
2017–2019	Yeh Un Dinon Ki Baat Hai	Sameer Maheshwari	
2021	India Alert	Raju	
2021–2022	Balika Vadhu 2	Anand	
2022	Meet: Badlegi Duniya Ki Reet	Advocate Anurag Rathi	
2023	Bade Achhe Lagte Hain 2	Raghav Arora	
2025	Anupamaa	Aryan Kothari	

=== Films ===
Year	Title	Role	Ref.
2019	Pranaam	Rahul	
2022	Saroj Ka Rishta	Vikram	

=== Web series ===
Year	Title	Role	Platform	Ref.
2020	Never Kiss Your Bestfriend - Lockdown Special	Punit		
2021	Virgin Suspect	Chandan		
2021	Pavitra Rishta 2	Sachin Deshmukh		
2025	Dooriyan - A Love Story	Megh Chaturvedi	YouTube	

=== Music videos ===
Year	Title	Singer(s)	Label	Ref.
2020	Mana Sakda Hai	Harish Moyal		
2021	Be My Valentine	Ashutosh "Aash" Bhardwaj		
2021	Tere Bina	Rahul Jain, Manali Chaturvedi		
2021	Jaan	Naman Shrivastava	TSeries	
2022	Dil Tujhko Chahe	Abhi Dutt	BLive Music	
2022	Kitna Pyara Naam Hai Tera	Aryan Tidke	BLive Music	
2022	Suni Sunai Baaton Pe	Purnima Tripathi	Zee Music Company	
2022	Mere Jaaniya	Digvijay Singh Pariyar		
2024	Rafta Rafta	Yasser Desai		

=== Micro-Dramas ===
Year	Title	Role	Platform	Ref.
2025	The Real Baadshah	Ansh	Pocket TV	
2025	The Truth Serum Wife	Anay	Zee5's Bullet	
2025	My Dream Girl	Vansh Kapoor	Kuku TV	
2026	Intern Vs CEO 2 †	Aarav Singhania	Story TV	

== Awards and nominations ==
Year	Award	Category	Work	Result	Ref.
2018	Indian Television Academy Awards	Best Actor Drama Popular	Yeh Un Dinon Ki Baat Hai	Nominated	
2019	Indian Television Academy Awards	Best Actor Drama Popular	Yeh Un Dinon Ki Baat Hai	Nominated	
2019	Indian Television Academy Awards	Best Onscreen Couple (With Ashi Singh)	Yeh Un Dinon Ki Baat Hai	Won	
2019	Indian Telly Awards	Best Onscreen Couple (With Ashi Singh)	Yeh Un Dinon Ki Baat Hai	Nominated	
2019	News18 Stardom Awards	Best Actor Male Editor's Choice	Yeh Un Dinon Ki Baat Hai	Won	
2023	International Iconic Awards	Iconic Versatile Actor of ITV	Bade Achhe Lagte Hain 2	Won	
