= Langmani Haduk =

1993 Kokborok film directed by Ruhi Debbarma

- Directed by: Ruhi Debbarma
- Written by: Ruhi Debbarma
- Starring: Ruhi Debbarma, Anirudha Debbarma, Sukurai Debbarma, Babita Reang, Anita Reang
- Cinematography: Alok Kundu, D. Roy
- Edited by: Ratan Sarkar
- Release date: 1993
- Running time: 82 minutes
- Country: India
- Language: Kokborok
- Budget: Unknown

Langmani Haduk is a 1993 Tripuri feature film in Kokborok language directed by Ruhi Debbarma that portrayed patriarchal norms through what may be referred to as "feudal familial romance." It took inspiration from the well-established social/family melodramas of Hindi cinema.

== See also ==
- Kokborok Cinema
- List of Kokborok-language films
