= Yeh Un Dinon Ki Baat Hai =

Indian television series (2017-2019)

- Genre: Coming of age Romantic drama
- Created by: Sumeet Hukamchand Mittal; Shashi Mittal
- Written by: Shashi Sumeet Mittal; Amit Aaryan Vaishali Naik Nageen Mirza; Rajesh Chawla; Mayur Puri; Sanjay Chhel
- Creative directors: Indrajeet Mukherjee; Ambica Sharma; Nageen Mirza
- Starring: See below
- Voices of: Kumar Sanu; Sadhana Sargam
- Theme music composer: Anu Malik; Nishant-Raja
- Opening theme: "Yeh Un Dinon Ki Baat Hai"
- Country of origin: India
- Original language: Hindi
- No. of seasons: 1
- No. of episodes: 497

Production
- Producers: Shashi Sumeet Mittal; Sumeet Hukamchand Mittal
- Production locations: Mumbai, Maharashtra, India
- Editors: Jay B Ghadiali, Saurabh Raj Khanna
- Running time: 21–23 minutes
- Production company: Shashi Sumeet Productions

Original release
- Network: Sony Entertainment Television
- Release: 5 September 2017 – 16 August 2019

Yeh Un Dinon Ki Baat Hai (transl. It's the Story of Those Days) is a Hindi coming of age romantic period drama television series produced by Shashi Sumeet Productions. It aired on Sony TV. It stars Ashi Singh and Randeep Rai as Naina Agarwal and Sameer Maheshwari. Set in the 1990s, it is inspired by the real-life love story of producers Shashi Mittal and Sumeet Mittal. It received a positive response from critics and audiences with praise for its performances and script.

After announcing that the show would end, Sony TV announced that the show would return with a second season.

== Plot ==
Set in 1990 in Ahmedabad, Naina Agarwal is a 16-year-old girl. Her mother died when she was young and she grows up neglected in a conservative family. Naina's father, Rakesh Agarwal, has an orthodox mindset, supporting only his son Arjun's dreams, and neglecting Naina. Meanwhile, Sameer Maheshwari studies at a boarding school in Nainital, but gets suspended and returns to his maternal grandfather, Jaiprakash Maheshwari, in Ahmedabad. His mother, Vishakha, comes to Ahmedabad to get him back to Delhi but Jaiprakash refuses to let Sameer go, believing Ahmedabad would help him. Sameer has a very bitter relationship with his mother due to her remarriage. Sameer joins Naina's school.

Sameer clashes with Naina after her honesty had got him into trouble. While Naina grows fond of Sameer, Sameer resents her. Sameer was the cool and popular kid liked by every single girl in his class.

A series of misunderstandings, one involving leaked question papers, further damage their relationship.

Sameer decides to take revenge on Naina after Rakesh publicly humiliates him. He bets with the seniors about making Naina say "I Love You" to him.

As they grow closer, Naina and her friend Swati begin testing Sameer's sincerity.

They grow closer in mount abu and sameer starts to ennjoy nainas simplicity and her ability to understand and uplift him. Filled with immmense guilt he tries confessiong about the bet but fails. naina finds out on her own after saying i love you and is left absolutely devasted and decides to distance herself and only focus on her studies and family however the betrayal leaves her wounded sameeer realises his feelings for naina and works as a helper listening to taunts all day in her sisters wedding, munna pandit stay with him to support sameer in his redemption arc. He gets insulted on a daily basis by her family and is falsely accused of being the reason behind arjuns leg injury which he was faking but he stays composed to show naina he is genuine this time and wants her to accept his apology. Preeti upon finding out also tries convincing naina along w shefali. Towards the end of the wedding they both secretly share a campa cola drink which implies that naina has forgiven him while simultaneously also accepting his love. Sameers grandfather Jaiprakash had already approved of their secret love but doesnt stay long enough in the world to support them in the future.

After Jaiprakash's demise,Sameer stops eating and feels extremely lonely. Sameer moves to Delhi without informing Naina. He reconciles with Vishaka and bonds with his stepsiblings. The couple finds their way back to each other and continues their long-distance relationship through a telephone with the help of sameers new friend Amrita. Naina helps sameer become a better person with her pure love and support but sameer falls into a wrong group of people and starts ruining his life with inappropraite magazines and alcohol breaking his promise to naina, his step grandmother despises him and makes his stay harder. After snapping out he actually starts to improve but his step grandmother fills cruel things into his head about himself. Sameer starts considering himself unlucky for his loved ones due to guilt and emotional struggles. He tries to disconnect from Naina, but Vishaka sends him back to Ahmedabad after noticing his condition.

Naina enrolls in VJN College and makes Sameer realize that his assumptions are wrong. Sameer and Naina rekindle their relationship in college but Naina breaks off their relationship after Arjuns affair gets caught. Nainas dad threatens to kill himself and Arjun unable to gather courage and accept the affair ruins shefalis name in the colony. Naina realises that their relationship would require a lot of courage and sacrifice but tells sameer that she doesnt want him to hate her and smile when he thinks back to his first love. After Naina agrees to her marriage with another guy Sameer feels that Naina never reciprocated her feelings for him and left him like a coward even though she previously promised him different things, in order to cope with the heartbreak he starts to date Sunaina and also tries to stir jealousy in Naina. However, after Nainas uncle finds out that they guy chosen for Naina is abusive and she already had someone she loves deeply he approves of her relationship and the couple eventuslly starts to date once again. Around the same time they get caught by the Agarwal's. Nainas family slaps her and attempts to marry her off forcefully. Sameer and Naina elope briefly with the help if Preeti and their friends- Swati, Hema, Kamya, Munna, Pandit. Later, Sameer and Naina's marriage is fixed. Sameers family disapproves their marriage because they disliked Nainas look and her middle class background however, sameer fights everyone disapproving and keeps constant respect for Nainas family which makes his parents think that Naina isnt the right fit for him.The Agarwal family remains divided over the marriage, but the couple marries with the help of friends and the remaining family. Sameer and Naina start living in a separate bungalow. Their marriage faces challenges due to differences in lifestyle and mindset. Sameer is removed from the family business, sells the bungalow and moves to Mumbai to explore new career opportunities. Naina takes up writing and their serial becomes a success.

Naina gives birth to their daughter, Suman. Sameer buys back his old bungalow in Ahmedabad. They return to Ahmedabad and reconcile with their family members. Naina, Sameer, and their friends reunite. The story concludes happily in 1998, with Naina and Sameer succeeding in their careers and life.

== Cast ==
=== Main ===
- Ashi Singh as Naina Agarwal Maheshwari – Rakesh and Rama's daughter; Bela and Anand's niece and daughter-figure; Arjun's sister; Pooja, Preeti and Prateek's cousin; Swati's bestfriend; Sameer's wife; Suman's mother (2017–19)
- Randeep Rai as Sameer Maheshwari – Vishakha's son; Vivek's step-son; Deepika's half-brother; Rohan's step-brother; Manoj, Bittu and Devang's cousin; Manoj and Pushpendra's best friend; Naina's husband; Suman's father(2017–19)

=== Recurring ===
- Ayesha Kaduskar as Preeti Agarwal – Anand and Bela's younger daughter; Pooja's sister; Arjun, Naina and Prateek's cousin; Shubham's wife (2017–19)
- Raghav Dhir as Pushpendra "Pandit" Kapoor – Sameer and Manoj's friend (2017–19)
- Kristina Patel as Swati Srivastava – Naina's best friend; Manoj's former love interest (2017–19)
- Hema Sood as Shefali Victor – Naina's pen friend; Arjun's former love interest (2017–18)
- Malina Kumra as Kamya – Naina's former nemesis turned friend (2017–19)
- Hema Sai as Hema – Naina's former nemesis turned friend (2017–19)
- Chandresh Singh as Rakesh Agarwal – Naresh and Anand's brother; Rama's widower; Naina and Arjun's father; Suman's grandfather (2017–19)
- Sachin Khurana as Anand Agarwal – Rakesh and Naresh's brother; Bela's husband; Pooja and Preeti's father; Naina's uncle and father-figure (2017–19)
- Madhusree Sharma as Bela Agarwal – Anand's wife; Preeti and Pooja's mother; Naina's aunt and mother-figure (2017–19)
- Abha Parmar as Beena Agarwal – Juhi's aunt; Naresh's wife; Prateek's mother; Pooja, Arjun, Naina and Preeti's aunt (2017–19)
- Sanjay Batra as Naresh Agarwal – Rakesh and Anand's brother; Beena's husband; Prateek's father; Pooja, Arjun, Naina and Preeti's Elder Uncle (2017–19)
- Somendra Solanki / Vivaan Singh Rajput as Arjun Agarwal – Rakesh and Rama's son; Naina's brother; Pooja, Preeti and Prateek's cousin; Shefali's former love interest; Juhi's husband (2017–18) / (2018–19)
- Manika Mehrotra as Rinki – Naina and Preeti's cousin (2018–19)
- Nidhi Bhavsar as Juhi Agarwal – Beena's niece; Arjun's wife (2018–19)
- Aditya as Prateek "Pralay" Agarwal – Naresh and Beena's son; Pooja, Arjun, Naina and Preeti's cousin (2017–18)
- Shweta Thakur as Pooja Agarwal Garg – Anand and Bela's elder daughter; Preeti's sister; Arjun, Naina and Prateek's cousin; Varun's wife (2017–19)
- Love Joshi as Varun Garg – Neeli's brother; Pooja's husband (2017–18)
- Jayshree T. as Phulla Bua – Pooja, Arjun, Naina, Preeti and Prateek's grand-aunt (2018–19)
- Vikas Tripathi as Shubham – Nirmala's son; Tanvi's brother; Preeti's husband (2019)
- Kanchan Gupta as Nirmala – Shubham and Tanvi's mother; Preeti's mother-in-law (2019)
- Tarjanee Bhadla as Tanvi Gadkari – Nirmala's daughter; Shubham's sister; Aditya's wife; Preeti's sister-in-law (2019)
- Meghan Jadhav as Aditya Gadkari – Gauri and Gopal's son; Sameer's brotherly friend; Tanvi's husband (2019)
- Manoj Kolhatkar as Gopal Gadkari – Naina and Sameer's neighbor; Gauri's husband; Aditya's father (2019)
- Anuradha as Gauri Gadkari – Gopal's wife; Aditya's mother (2019)
- Sheetal Maulik as Sejal Gadkari – Aditya's sister-in-law (2019)
- Sanjay Choudhary as Manoj "Munna" Dhawan – Sameer's cousin; Sameer and Pushpendra's friend; Swati's former love interest; Rewa's husband (2017–19)
- Prachi Joshi as Rewa Dhawan – Munna's wife (2019)
- Kiran Kumar as Jaiprakash Dinanath Maheshwari – Leela's widower; Vishakha's father; Sameer, Manoj and Deepika's grandfather; Rohan's step-grandfather; Suman's great-grandfather (Dead) (2017–18)
- Vaishnavi Mahant as Vishakha Maheshwari Somani – Leela and Jaiprakash's daughter; Kamlesh's cousin; Vivek's second wife; Sameer and Deepika's mother; Rohan's step-mother; Suman's grandmother; Naina's mother-in-law (2017–19)
- Melanie Nazareth as Prabha Maheshwari – Kamlesh's wife; Bittu and Devang's mother; Sameer, Manoj and Deepika's aunt; Rohan's step-aunt (2018–19)
- Rajendra Chawla as Kamlesh Maheshwari – Vishakha's cousin; Prabha's husband; Bittu and Devang's father; Sameer, Manoj and Deepika's uncle; Rohan's step-uncle (2018–19)
- Atul Verma as Devang Maheshwari – Kamlesh and Prabha's son; Bittu's brother; Sameer, Manoj and Deepika's cousin; Rohan's step-cousin; Poonam's husband (2018–19)
- Subuhi Joshi as Poonam Maheshwari – Devang's wife (2018–19)
- Sandeep Rajora as Vivek Somani – Vishakha's second husband; Rohan and Deepika's father; Sameer's step-father; Suman's step-grandfather (2017–19)
- Kitu Gidwani as Mrs. Somani – Vivek's mother; Rohan and Deepika's grandmother; Sameer's step-grandmother; Suman's step-great-grandmother (2018)
- Rohit Chandel as Rohan Somani – Vivek's son; Vishaka's step-son; Deepika's half-brother; Sameer's step-brother; Bittu and Devang's step-cousin (2018)
- Riddhima Taneja as Deepika Somani – Vivek and Vishaka's daughter; Sameer and Rohan's half-sister; Bittu and Devang's cousin (2018)
- Kiara Bhanushali as Suman Maheshwari – Sameer and Naina's daughter (2019)
- Ahsaan Qureshi as U.P Pandey – Principal of Pragati Vidya Ka Mandir (2017–18)
- Rishina Kandhari as Ms. Shanti – Maths teacher of Pragati Vidya Ka Mandir; Naina's teacher and mentor (2017–18)
- Rushad Rana as Lochan Sir – Ex-drama teacher turned principal in Pragati Vidya Ka Mandir (2017–19)
- Vikram Singh Rathod as Sanjay Tibriwal – Naina's admirer turned sworn brother and classmate at school (2017)
- Charu Trikha as Mitali – Rival gang's member at college; Pushpendra's former crush (2018)
- Nirbhay Shukla as Vicky – Kartik's friend; Naina and Sameer's senior (2018)
- Vaibhav Shrivastav as Priyank – Kartik's friend; Naina's rival (2018)
- Sejal Sharma as Dimple – Vicky's classmate and Sameer's admirer (2018)
- Nishi Singh as Sunaina Parekh – Naina and Sameer's nemesis at college (2018)
- Hitesh Sharma as Kartik Dholakia – Sameer and Naina's nemesis at college (2018)
- Guddi Maruti as VJN college Principal (2018)
- Vishnu Sharma as Jayesh Bhoummik Raval aka JBR – Accounts teacher of VJN college (2018)
- Arjun Aneja as Farzan Poonawala – Teacher appointed for college play rehearsals, Preeti's crush (2018)
- Garima Joshi as Sahiba – Sameer and Naina's neighbour (2019)
- Vipul Deshpande as Bakshi – Naina's boss (2019)
- Ruchita Vijay Jadhav as Vanita – Jatin's wife; Sameer and Naina's neighbour and Society secretary (2019)
- Devang Taana as Jatin – Shibani's brother; Vanita's husband; Naina and Sameer's neighbour (2019)
- Urvi Vyas as Shibani – Jatin's sister (2019)
- Simran Lulla as Amrita Khanna – Sameer's neighbour and friend in Delhi (2018)
- Paras Priyadarshan as Sharad – Naina's proposed groom (2018)
- Rashika Singh as Neeli Madhumakkhi – Varun's sister (2018)
- Devarshi Shah as Raghav aka Ameer Maheshwari – Naina's fake husband (2019)

=== Guests ===
- Kumar Sanu (2018)
- Anant Mahadevan (2019)
- Aruna Irani (2019)

=== Voiceover ===
- Sadiya Siddiqui as elderly narrator Naina's Voiceover
- Jiten Lalwani as elderly narrator Sameer's Voiceover

== Soundtrack ==
The opening theme of Yeh Un Dinon Ki Baat Hai was composed by Anu Malik. The lyrics were written by Sanjay Chhel. It was sung by Kumar Sanu and Sadhana Sargam. The song was known for its melodious lyrics, which recall happenings in the 1990s.

== Reception ==
It was mainly hailed for its fresh outlook and for bringing out nostalgia and flavours of the 90s. It topped Sony TV shows by gaining a TRP of 1.5 in its first week.

The Times of India hailed it as one of the best TV shows launched in 2017 and praised the performances of newcomers Ashi Singh and Randeep Rai .

The UK's weekly Asian newspaper Eastern Eye praised the creative team of the show for leaving no stone unturned to recreate the city of Ahmedabad from an earlier era, calling it a tribute to the city.

This show has earned compliments from various television and film actors.

== Awards and nominations ==
Year	Award	Category	Nominee	Result
2018	Gold Awards	Best Debut (Female)	Ashi Singh	Nominated
2018	Indian Television Academy Awards	Best Actor (Popular)	Randeep Rai	Nominated
2018	Indian Telly Awards	Best Story (Jury)	Yeh Un Dinon Ki Baat Hai	Won
2019	Kalakar Awards	Best Female Debut	Ashi Singh	Won
2019	Indian Telly Awards	Best Jodi (Popular)	Ashi Singh & Randeep Rai	Nominated
2019	Indian Telly Awards	Best Daily Series (Popular)	Yeh Un Dinon Ki Baat Hai	Nominated
2019	Stardom Awards	Editor's Choice- Best Actor Male	Randeep Rai	Won
2019	Stardom Awards	Devrani ki Best Devrani- Best Debut Female	Ashi Singh	Nominated
2019	Indian Television Academy Awards	Best Actress (Popular)	Ashi Singh	Nominated
2019	Indian Television Academy Awards	Best Actor (Popular)	Randeep Rai	Nominated
2019	Indian Television Academy Awards	Best Jodi (Popular)	Ashi Singh & Randeep Rai	Won
2019	Indian Television Academy Awards	Best Show (Popular)	Yeh Un Dinon Ki Baat Hai	Nominated

== See also ==
- List of programs broadcast by Sony Entertainment Television
