= Tanveer Ghazi =

Indian lyricist

- Occupations: Lyricist, poet, author
- Notable work: Pink, October, Hate Story 2, 18.11: A Code of Secrecy, Ek Tha Hero, Kadak Singh

Tanveer Ghazi is an Indian lyricist, poet and author known for his work predominantly in Bollywood films like Pink (2016 film), October (2018 film), Hate Story 2, Yeh Saali Aashiqui, 18.11: A Code of Secrecy and Ek Tha Hero. Ghazi has participated in several TV programs including Sahitya Aajtak.

His most recent notable work is the 2023 film Kadak Singh.
