= Sa Re Ga Ma Pa Singing Superstar =

Hero Honda – Sa Re Ga Ma Pa Singing Superstar is the 4th installment of the Sa Re Ga Ma Pa Challenge series which premiered on 13 August 2010 on Zee TV. This series is hosted by Manish Paul, although the first shows were hosted by Purab Kohli. The mentors during this season are Daler Mehndi, Vishal–Shekhar (Vishal Dadlani and Shekhar Ravjiani) and Sajid–Wajid (Sajid Ali and Wajid Ali).

== Contestants ==
=== Winner ===
- Kamal Khan (singer), Patiala (1989), Team Vishal–Shekhar

=== Finalists ===
- Abhilasha Venkatachalam, Pune (1988), Team Daler
- Bishakh Jyoti, Kolkata (1987), Team Sajid–Wajid

=== Eliminated ===
- Abhishek Mukherjee, Kolkata (1988), Team Vishal–Shekhar
- Ali Sher, Faislabad, Pakistan (1985), Team Vishal–Shekhar
- Altamash Faridi, Saharanpur (1989), Team Sajid–Wajid
- Dipanwita Choudhury, Hooghly (1983), Team Sajid–Wajid
- Fareed Hasan Niyazi, New Delhi (1985), Wild Card Challenger
- Harnoor Kaur, Delhi (2000), Team Daler
- Karma Sherpa, Darjeeling (1984), Team Vishal–Shekhar
- Khurram Iqbal, Faislabad, Pakistan (1989), Team Sajid–Wajid
- Maampee Nair, Shillong (1987), Team Vishal–Shekhar
- Madhura Kumbhar, Mumbai (1988), Team Vishal–Shekhar
- Mugdha Hasabnis, Dombivli (1988), Team Daler
- Nakul Abhyankar, Mangalore (1990), Team Daler
- Ranjeet Rajwada, Jaipur (1992), Team Daler
- Rini Chandra, Vancouver, British Columbia, Canada (1986), Team Sajid–Wajid
- Shreyasi Chakraborty, Kolkata (1989), Team Sajid–Wajid
- Sniti Mishra, Odisha (1987), Team Daler
- Sugandha Mishra, Mumbai (1989), Team Vishal–Shekhar
- Tajinder Singh Ahuja, Faridabad (1993), Team Daler
