= Fareb (2005 film) =

- Directed by: Deepak Tijori
- Written by: Girish Dhamija; Bijesh Jayarajan
- Produced by: Sanjiv Jaiswal; Rajesh Singh
- Starring: Shilpa Shetty; Shamita Shetty; Manoj Bajpayee
- Cinematography: Manoj Soni
- Edited by: Asif Khan
- Music by: Anu Malik
- Distributed by: Dayal Creations
- Release date: 8 July 2005
- Running time: 129 minutes
- Country: India
- Language: Hindi
- Budget: ₹ 3.50 crore
- Box office: ₹ 1.08 crore

Fareb (English: Cheat) is a 2005 Indian Hindi-language romantic thriller film directed by Deepak Tijori. The film stars sisters Shilpa Shetty and Shamita Shetty and Manoj Bajpai. The film's music is composed by Anu Malik.

== Plot ==
Aditya works as a creative director in an advertising agency. His wife, Neha, a medical practitioner, is devoted to her husband and kid. Riya is married to Amit Singhania, a corporate honcho who happened to be a client of Aditya's ad-agency. Riya and Aditya meet at a presentation and she gets attracted to him. Riya is completely smitten by Aditya and tries to seduce him time and again. He spurns her advances initially but succumbs to her charms eventually. This leads to a rift between Aditya and Neha. And then the unthinkable happens: Riya is murdered. The needle of suspicion points towards Aditya and the cops arrest him. Someone is also watching Aditya and blackmailing him for his affair with Riya. In the end it's shown that Neha killed Riya in a fit of rage. She goes to confront Riya and ask her to leave her husband but Riya insults her and tells Neha to get out of her house. So Neha gets mad and hits Riya with a vase killing her. In the end, she gets away with Riya's murder and lives happily with her husband.

== Cast ==
- Shilpa Shetty as Dr. Neha Malhotra
- Manoj Bajpayee as Aditya 'Adi' Malhotra
- Shamita Shetty as Ria Singhania
- Parmeet Sethi as Siddharth Sardesai
- Milind Gunaji as Advocate Milind Mehta
- Kelly Dorji as Inspector Kelly Dorjee
- Shawar Ali as Undercover police officer
- Sonia Kapoor as Sonia Sharma
- Hemant Pandey as Police officer
- Bakul Thakker as Amit Singhania, Ria's husband
- Homi Wadia as Public Prosecutor Saxena

== Music ==
Fareb

Soundtrack album by Anu Malik
- Released: 5 July 2005
- Genre: Feature film soundtrack
- Label: Saregama

All music composed by Anu Malik; lyrics are written by Sayeed Quadri.

1. "Baras Jaa Aye Badal" (Shower O'clouds) -Sunidhi Chauhan - Lyrics by Sayeed Quadri
2. "Pehle Se Ab Woh Din" (The days are not like before) - Shreya Ghoshal, Kunal Ganjawala
3. "Pehle se ab Woh Din (remix)" - Shreya Ghoshal, Kunal Ganjawala
4. "Jau Kaha Tere Bina" - (Where should I go without you) Udit Narayan, Shraddha Pandit, Zubeen Garg
5. "Shaam Aayegi" (The evening will come) - Sonu Nigam
6. "Subah Bhi Beqaraar Hain". (The morning is restless) - Alisha Chinoy

== Reception ==
Taran Adarsh of IndiaFM gave the film 2 out of 5, writing ″Manoj Bajpai handles his role with amazing ease. He is superb in two sequences mainly, his angry outburst [with Shamita] and the courtroom sequence in the pre-climax. Shilpa Shetty maintains the studied silence part with grace and maturity. Shamita Shetty is getting better with every film. First ZEHER and now FAREB, she has evolved into a fine actor. Also, she exhibits her anatomy without any inhibitions. Kelly Dorji is expressionless. Milind Gunaji and Parmeet Sethi are okay. On the whole, FAREB is an average fare. Patcy N of Rediff.com wrote ″Tijori got actors like Bajpai and beautiful women like Shilpa and Shamita, and yet, he could not produce good results. He cannot seem to make up his mind whether he wants a suspense thriller or a romantic film. The screenplay drags.″
