= Pranaam =

2019 Hindi language action film

- Theatrical release poster
- Directed by: Sanjiv Jaiswal
- Written by: Sanjiv Jaiswal
- Produced by: Anil Singh; Nitin Mishra
- Starring: Rajeev Khandelwal; Sameksha; Atul Kulkarni; Abhimanyu Singh; Vikram Gokhale; Anirudh Dave
- Cinematography: Akashdeep Pandey
- Edited by: Amita Shri Narayan Singh
- Music by: Songs: Jaan Nissar Lone; Vishal Mishra; Score: Jaan Nissar Lone
- Production companies: Rudraksh Adventures Pvt. Ltd; Woodside Infrastructure Pvt. Ltd; Reel & Motion Pictures LLP.
- Release date: 9 August 2019
- Running time: 120 minutes
- Country: India
- Language: Hindi

Pranaam (transl. Greetings) is a 2019 Indian Hindi-language action film directed and written by Sanjiv Jaiswal, and produced by Anil Singh and Nitin Mishra. The film's score was composed by Jaan Nissar Lone. The film stars Rajeev Khandelwal, Abhimanyu Singh, Atul Kulkarni, Vikram Gokhale and Sameksha Singh. It was released theatrically on 9 August 2019.

== Plot ==
The film follows story of an IAS officer turned gangster (played by Rajeev Khandelwal).

== Cast ==
- Rajeev Khandelwal as Ajay Singh
- Atul Kulkarni as Inspector Rajpal Singh
- Abhimanyu Singh as Gyanu Singh
- Sameksha Singh as Manjri Shukla
- Vikram Gokhale as Tej Pratap Singh
- Apoorva Arora as Soha
- Meenakshi Sethi as Tej Pratap Singh's wife
- Randeep Rai as Rahul ( a young lawyer )
- Aniruddh Dave as Arjun
- S. M. Zaheer as Deenanath (Baba)

== Marketing and release ==
The film was released on 9 August 2019.

== Soundtrack ==
Pranaam

Soundtrack album by Vishal Mishra and Jaan Nisaar Lone
- Released: 31 July 2019
- Recorded: 2018–2019
- Genre: Feature film soundtrack
- Length: 28:14
- Language: Hindi
- Label: T-Series

Vishal Mishra chronology
Kabir Singh (2019)	Pranaam (2019)	Jabariya Jodi (2019)
External audio
- Official Audio Jukebox on YouTube

The music is composed by Vishal Mishra and Jaan Nisaar Lone.

All lyrics are written by Manoj Muntashir.

Track listing
No.	Title	Singer(s)	Length
1.	"Sirf Tu"	Armaan Malik	6:17
2.	"Jai Hanumaan"	Sukhwinder Singh	5:10
3.	"Ilaahi"	Sonu Nigam	6:05
4.	"Zindagi"	Ankit Tiwari	6:09
5.	"Rann Ki Dahaad" (Music by Jaan Nisaar Lone & Lyrics by Shiv Sagar Singh)	Brijesh Shandilya	4:33
Total length:			28:14
