= Saroj Ka Rishta =

2022 film directed by Abhishek Saxena

- Official Release Poster
- Directed by: Abhishek Saxena
- Story by: Deepak Kapur Bhardwaj
- Produced by: Anmol Kapoor; Nazia Siddiqui; Narendra Garg; Raman Kapoor
- Starring: Sanah Kapur; Kumud Mishra; Kritikka Avasthi; Gaurav Pandey; Randeep Rai
- Cinematography: Vasudev Rane
- Edited by: Paresh Manjrekar
- Music by: Rahul Jail
- Production companies: Ambi Abhi Productions; Aena Productions; Kapoor Films
- Release date: 16 September 2022
- Country: India
- Language: Hindi

Saroj Ka Rishta is a 2022 Indian Hindi-language Romantic comedy film directed by Abhishek Saxena and Starring Sanah Kapur, Gaurav Pandey, Kritikka Avasthi, Randeep Rai and Kumud Mishra.

== Cast ==
- Sanah Kapur as Saroj
- Kumud Mishra
- Gaurav Pandey
- Kritikka Avasthi as Inaya
- Randeep Rai
- Mukesh S Bhatt
- Neelu Kohli
