= Ashi Singh =

Indian television actress

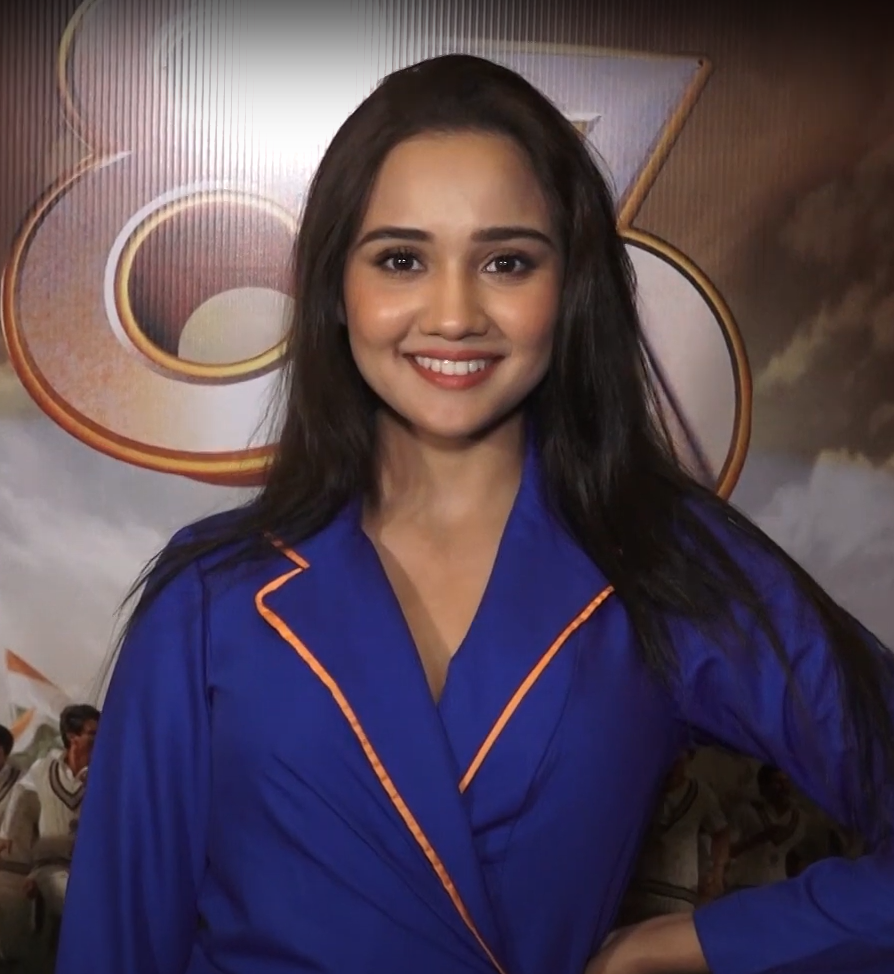
- Singh in 2021
- Born: 12 August 1997 (age 29); Agra, Uttar Pradesh, India
- Occupation: Actress
- Years active: 2015–present
- Known for: Yeh Un Dinon Ki Baat Hai; Meet: Badlegi Duniya Ki Reet

Ashi Singh is an Indian actress best known for her roles in Yeh Un Dinon Ki Baat Hai and Meet: Badlegi Duniya Ki Reet.

== Career ==
Ashi Singh made her television debut in 2015 with Secret Diaries: The Hidden Chapters. She has also appeared in Gumrah, Crime Patrol, and Savdhaan India. Additionally, she made a cameo appearance in Qaidi Band as the jailer's daughter.

From 2017 to 2019, she played the lead role of Naina Agarwal in SET India's Yeh Un Dinon Ki Baat Hai opposite Randeep Rai.

In July 2020, after Avneet Kaur left the show for health reasons, Ashi assumed the role of Yasmine on Sony SAB's Aladdin – Naam Toh Suna Hoga alongside Siddharth Nigam.

From August 2021 to June 2023, she portrayed Meet Hooda in Zee TV's Meet: Badlegi Duniya Ki Reet opposite Shagun Pandey. From June 2023 to November 2023, she played the role of the character's daughter, Sumeet.

In June 2025, she has been seen as Kairi Sharma in Sab TV's Ufff... Yeh Love Hai Mushkil opposite Shabir Ahluwalia. In the same month, she also appeared in Amazon MX Player's First Copy, playing the role of Afreen opposite Munawar Faruqui.

== In the media ==
In 2019, Singh was featured on the cover of Eastern Eye in its 1500th issue, under the title of "The Future Belongs to Ashi Singh". In 2020, Eastern Eye also listed her in Dynamic dozen for the decade in its 8th position.

== Filmography ==
=== Films ===
Year	Title	Role	Notes	Ref.
2017	Qaidi Band	Tulika	Cameo	

=== Television ===
Year	Title	Role	Notes	Ref.
2015	Secret Diaries: The Hidden Chapters	Lavanya		
2016	Gumrah: End of Innocence	Kajal		
2016	Crime Patrol	Swetha		
2016	Savdhaan India	Raji/Soni/Chitra/Priya		
2017–2019	Yeh Un Dinon Ki Baat Hai	Naina Agarwal Maheshwari		
2020–2021	Aladdin – Naam Toh Suna Hoga	Yasmine	Season 3	
2021–2023	Meet: Badlegi Duniya Ki Reet	Meet/Sumeet		
2025	Ufff..Yeh Love Hai Mushkil	Advocate Kairi Sharma		

=== Web Series & Micro Drama ===
Year	Title	Role	Platform	Notes	Ref.
2025	First Copy	Afreen	Amazon MX Player	Web Series	
2025	First Copy 2	Afreen	Amazon MX Player	Web Series	
2026	Pyaar On Road	Prakriti	Kuku TV	Microdrama	
2026	Jab Suri Met Superstar	Suri Bhasin	Bullet Micro Drama	Microdrama	
2026	Koi Tumsa Nahi	Avni	Story TV	Microdrama	
2026	Intern vs CEO 2	Kavya Malhotra	Story TV	Microdrama	

=== Music videos ===
Year	Title	Singer(s)	Notes	Ref.
2017	Zindagi Tujhse Kya Karen Shikvey	Amit Mishra	Cameo	
2020	Tere Naal Rehna	Jeet Gannguli, Jyotica Tangri		
2021	Baadlon Se Aage	Palash Muchhal, Palak Muchhal		
2021	Kareeb	Vishal Dadlani		
2021	Deal	Harvi		
2021	Haan Karde	Vinay Aditya, Kanika Singh		
2022	Dil Tujhko Chahe	Abhi Dutt		
2022	Dil Ruseyaa	Bishwajit Ghosh		
2022	Tumhe Khoke	Dipessh Kashyap		
2025	Aahat	Musical Tarsh		
2026	Dil Lagana Mana Tha	Krish, Kishore Mondal		
2026	Thaari Kasam	Sultana Nooran		

== Award and nominations ==
Year	Award	Category	Work	Result	Ref.
2019	Indian Television Academy Awards	Best Jodi – Jury (With Randeep Rai)	Yeh Un Dinon Ki Baat Hai	Won	
2022	Indian Television Academy Awards	Best Actress – Jury	Meet: Badlegi Duniya Ka Reet	Won	
2022	Indian Television Academy Awards	Best Actress – Popular	Meet: Badlegi Duniya Ka Reet	Nominated	
2023	Indian Telly Awards	Best Actress (Jury)	Meet: Badlegi Duniya Ka Reet	Won	
