= Sudra =

Sudra may refer to:

- Shudra, one of the Varnas in the traditional four-section division in the Hindu caste system
- Sudra Kingdom, one of the kingdoms of ancient India mentioned in the epic Mahabharata
- Sudarium, a Latin word, literally meaning 'sweat cloth', used for wiping the face clean and now associated with Christian liturgical usage and art
- Sedreh, sure or sudra, a garment worn by Zoroastrians
- Sudra, a planet in Axiom Verge, where the events of the game take place
- Sudra (headdress), a traditional Jewish headdress

== See also ==
- Shudra (disambiguation)
