= Longtharai (film) =

- Directed by: Dipak Bhattacharya
- Screenplay by: Dipak Bhattacharya
- Story by: Bimal Sinha
- Based on: Karachi Theke Longtharai
- Production company: North Eastern Films
- Release date: 1986
- Running time: 75 minutes
- Country: India
- Language: Kokborok

Longtharai is a 1986 first Kokborok film directed by Dipak Bhattacharya, adapted from Tripura’s former Health and Urban Development Minister and CPIM leader Bimal Sinha’s novel "Karachi theke Longtharai".

== Production ==
The 75-minute film's screenplay was created by Bhattacharya, who also directed it amid the intense political unrest that would engulf Tripura's hinterlands in the late 1980s. In the 1980s, shooting in celluloid with sync sound and color was a significant advance for aspiring filmmakers in Tripura. Only two prints of Longtharai were reportedly made, one of which is in the possession of the Government of Tripura, reportedly as a result of inadequate financial support and an exceedingly laborious post-production procedure during the celluloid era.

== See also ==
- Kokborok Cinema
- List of Kokborok-language films

== Bibliography ==
- Barma, Aloy Deb. Reading Contemporary Kokborok and Bengali Films and Videos in Tripura: History, Technology and Infrastructure. 2022. Jadavpur U.
- Debroy, Prajapita. Is Tripuriness Endangered? Read ing the Diffused Substance of Tripuri Indigeneity and Hybridity in Contemporary Kokborok Films against Bollywood in a Post-Globalization Era. 2023. Tripura U.
