= Khaani (film) =

- Official theatrical release poster
- Directed by: Ploto Debbarma
- Written by: Ploto Debbarma
- Produced by: Payal Debbarma, Kishan Debbarma
- Starring: Ruhi Debbarma; Madhusudhan Debbarma; Anamika Tripura
- Music by: Halog Jamatia
- Production company: 18 Hills Films
- Release date: 30 October 2026
- Running time: 138 minutes
- Country: India
- Language: Kokborok

Khaani is an Indian Kokborok-language crime-thriller film directed by Ploto Debbarma.

== Plot ==
A newly posted police officer expects a peaceful tenure in Khumpuimura until the discovery of severed body parts shatters the village's calm. As his routine investigation unfolds, buried secrets and disturbing truths emerge, revealing a dark underbelly that threatens to consume the entire village.

== Cast ==
- Ruhi Debbarma
- Madhusudan Debbarma
- Pohar Jamatia
- Ajay Tripura
- Hemchandra Tripura
- Anamika Tripura

== Release ==
The film was released in theatre on 30 October 2026 in Tripura. This film also screened in 31st Kolkata International Film Festival and 1st International Film Festival of Jammu & Kashmir.
