= Shamita Shetty =

Indian actress (born 1979)

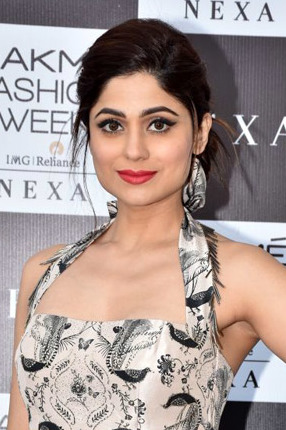
- Shetty in 2018
- Born: 2 February 1979 (age 47); Mangalore, Karnataka, India
- Education: Sydenham College of Commerce and Economics; SNDT Women's University; Central Saint Martins
- Occupations: Actress; interior designer
- Years active: 1996–present
- Relatives: Shilpa Shetty (sister)

Shamita Shetty (born 2 February 1979) is an Indian actress and interior designer. The younger sister of actress Shilpa Shetty, she made her acting debut with Mohabbatein, which earned her the IIFA Award for Star Debut of the Year – Female. She went on to do films including Bewafaa, Zeher, and Cash. She also participated in Bigg Boss 3, Bigg Boss OTT 1, Bigg Boss 15, Khatron Ke Khiladi 9 and Jhalak Dikhhla Jaa 8.

== Early life ==
Shetty was born on 2 February 1979. She belongs to a Tulu-speaking Bunt family that are based in Mumbai. Her late father Surendra Shetty and mother Sunanda were manufacturers of tamper proof water caps in the pharmaceutical industry. Well-known actress Shilpa Shetty is her elder sister.

Shetty did her schooling from St. Anthony's Girls' High School, Mumbai. After completing her degree in commerce from Sydenham College, she did a fashion designing diploma from SNDT College, Mumbai. After this, she started her internship with fashion designer Manish Malhotra, but Manish saw a spark in her and suggested to prep her for her acting career. In 2011, Shetty decided to follow her passion in interior design. Her first solo project was Royalty, a club in Mumbai. Later, her love for interior design pushed her to do a diploma from Central Saint Martins and Inchbald School of Design in London.

== Career ==
=== Mohabbatein and early work (2000–2013) ===
Shetty made her film debut in 2000 with the Yash Raj Films movie Mohabbatein, directed by Aditya Chopra. Her portrayal of Ishika earned her the 2001 IIFA Award for Star Debut of the Year – Female. Soon after, she gave hit dance numbers to Bollywood, including Sharara Sharara in Mere Yaar Ki Shaadi Hai (2002), Chori Pe Chori in Saathiya (2002) and Mind Blowing Mahiya in Cash (2007). She was appreciated for her acting in the film Zeher (2005), for which she was nominated for the Stardust Award as Star of the Year Female (2006). Sify said, "Shamita Shetty is a surprise, a revelation. The actress proves that she can deliver if given an opportunity. She looks gorgeous all through, but more than anything else, it's her talent that you notice at the end of the show." She worked with her sister Shilpa Shetty in the film Fareb. She also starred in multi-star projects like Bewafaa (2005) and Cash (2007). In 2009, she participated in the reality television series Bigg Boss 3. After 42 days, she left the show to attend her sister Shilpa Shetty's wedding. She was the only contestant who wasn't nominated even once during her stay in the Bigg Boss house.

=== Focus on interior design and entrepreneurship (2013–2017) ===
Alongside her acting career, Shetty decided to focus on her passion for interior designing. After completing an interior designing course in London and finishing an internship with an architect's firm, she launched her own interior designing company Golden Leaf Interiors. Her first interior designing project was Royalty, a club in Mumbai. She designed her sister, Shilpa Shetty's son Viaan's room. She won the Best Interior Design Award at the Asia Spa Awards for designing Chandigarh Iosis Spa. In 2015, Shetty participated on the dancing reality show Jhalak Dikhhla Jaa 8.

=== Further work, Bigg Boss return and recognition (2017–present) ===
In 2017, She starred in Voot's comedy web series Yo Ke Hua Bro, also co-starring Aparshakti Khurana, Gaurav Pandey and Ridhima Pandit. In 2019, she participated in Colors TV's stunt reality show Fear Factor: Khatron Ke Khiladi, ending up as the third runner up. Shetty then starred in T-Series' music video titled Teri Maa.

In 2020, she starred in the film The Tenant as Meera. She then portrayed Kavita Tharoor in ZEE5's thriller film Black Widows. The Indian Express said that “Shamita Shetty brings a vivaciousness to her role.” In 2021, The Tenant was screened at the Indian Film Festival of Los Angeles. It won the Best Film Award at the Indian Film Festival Stuttgart 2021.

In September 2021, she participated in Voot's Bigg Boss OTT 1, finishing as the second runner up. In October, she participated in Colors TV's Bigg Boss 15. She became the first and the last captain of the season, and the only contestant to become the captain twice. Shetty also won the Style Icon Award. She finished her journey as the third runner up.

In 2022, she starred in T-Series' music video titled Tere Vich Rab Disda. About her role in The Tenant (2023), her return to cinema after 15 years, Shetty said, "The Tenant is a reflection of society from a modern, independent, single woman's perspective, with experiences and learnings every woman in India has been subjected to at some point of her life. The compelling backdrop and sensitive as well as realistic narrative of the film connected with me, prompting me to instantly agree to do the film. I truly believe, every woman and the people around her, would deeply resonate with the story, offering a deeper insight into the disturbing, prevailing realities of the society we live in today."

== Other work ==
=== Philanthropy ===
In 2012, Shetty walked the ramp for charity fashion show Caring With Style to raise money for children suffering from cancer. In 2013, she starred in Betiyaan, a government initiated social cause music video for the Save the girl child campaign.

In 2017, Shetty collaborated with an NGO that is dedicated to the cause of providing care for stray and abandoned cats. She also walked the ramp for Roopa Vohra at the fashion show for a social cause She Matters. In 2018, she joined hands with Help Age India, an NGO that works for the welfare of the elderly. Shetty took part in a digital literacy initiative and said that familiarising the elderly with latest technology is crucial in keeping them connected.

In 2019, Shetty flagged off a walkathon on the International Day for Older Persons, vouching for the government to increase pension for the elderly. Shetty visits an orphanage on her birthday every year and spends time with the elderly, bringing them packed surprises.

=== Brands and associations ===
Shetty has endorsed Pantene with sister Shilpa Shetty for a year. She has been associated with brands and companies like Aldo, Audi and the IIFJAS Jewellery exhibition.

== Media image ==
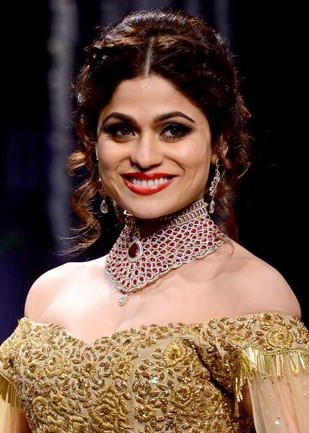
Shetty at India International Jewellery Week

In 2016, Shetty walked the ramp during Lakme Fashion Week for Divya Reddy. In 2017, she walked the India International Jewellery Week ramp for Surya Golds. She also walked the ramp for Swarovski Gemstones at GJC NITE 2019. In 2020, she was the showstopper for designer Priya Machineni's spring collection at Lotus India Fashion Week.

Shetty has featured on covers of magazines like The Lifestyle Journalist, G Magazine, Stuff Magazine, iCraze, Women Fitness Magazine, Femina India and Fitlook Magazine.

== Personal life ==
Shetty met actor Rakesh Bapat on the sets of Bigg Boss OTT 1 and they began dating in September 2021. The couple broke up in July 2022.

Shetty is an avid fitness and wellness enthusiast. She is often seen promoting workout routines, meditation and yoga. She also enjoys painting and has two cats, Phoebe and Loki. She enjoys gardening and has greenery such as spider plants, snake plants, creepers, and flowers at her home.

== Filmography ==
=== Films ===
Year	Title	Role	Notes	Ref.
2000	Mohabbatein	Ishika Dhanrajgir		
2002	Raajjiyam	Geeta Karthikeyan	Tamil film	
2002	Mere Yaar Ki Shaadi Hai		Special appearance in the song "Sharara Sharara"	
2002	Pilisthe Palukutha	Shanti	Telugu film	
2002	Saathiya		Special appearance in the song "Chori Pe Chori"	
2004	Agnipankh	Anjana		
2004	Wajahh: A Reason to Kill	Ishita Singhania		
2005	Fareb	Ria Singhania		
2005	Zeher	Sonia Mehra		
2005	Bewafaa	Pallavi Arora		
2007	Cash	Shanaya Rao		
2007	Heyy Babyy		Special appearance in the song "Heyy Baby"	
2008	Hari Puttar: A Comedy of Terrors		Special appearance in the song "Tutari Baje"	
2008	Naan Aval Adhu	Geeta	Tamil film Unreleased	
2023	The Tenant	Meera		

=== Web series ===
Year	Title	Role	Ref.
2017	Yo Ke Hua Bro	Suman Rao	
2020	Black Widows	Kavita Tharoor	

=== Television ===
Year	Title	Role	Notes	Ref.
2009	Bigg Boss 3	Contestant	Walked: Day 43	
2015	Jhalak Dikhhla Jaa 8	Contestant	3rd place	
2019	Fear Factor: Khatron Ke Khiladi 9	Contestant	4th place	
2021	Bigg Boss OTT 1	Contestant	3rd place	
2021–2022	Bigg Boss 15	Contestant	4th place	

=== Music video appearances ===
Year	Title	Singer(s)	Ref.
2013	"Betiyaan"	Shankar Mahadevan, Sunidhi Chauhan, Sonu Nigam	
2019	"Teri Maa"	Dolly Sidhu, Roop Sidhu	
2022	"Tere Vich Rab Disda"	Sachet–Parampara	

== Awards and nominations ==
Year	Award	Category	Work	Result	Ref.
2001	International Indian Film Academy Awards	Star Debut of the Year Female	Mohabbatein	Won	
2006	Stardust Awards	Star of the Year Female	Zeher	Nominated	
2022	Iconic Gold Awards	Powerpacked Personality of the Year	Bigg Boss 15	Won	
