= Sniti Mishra =

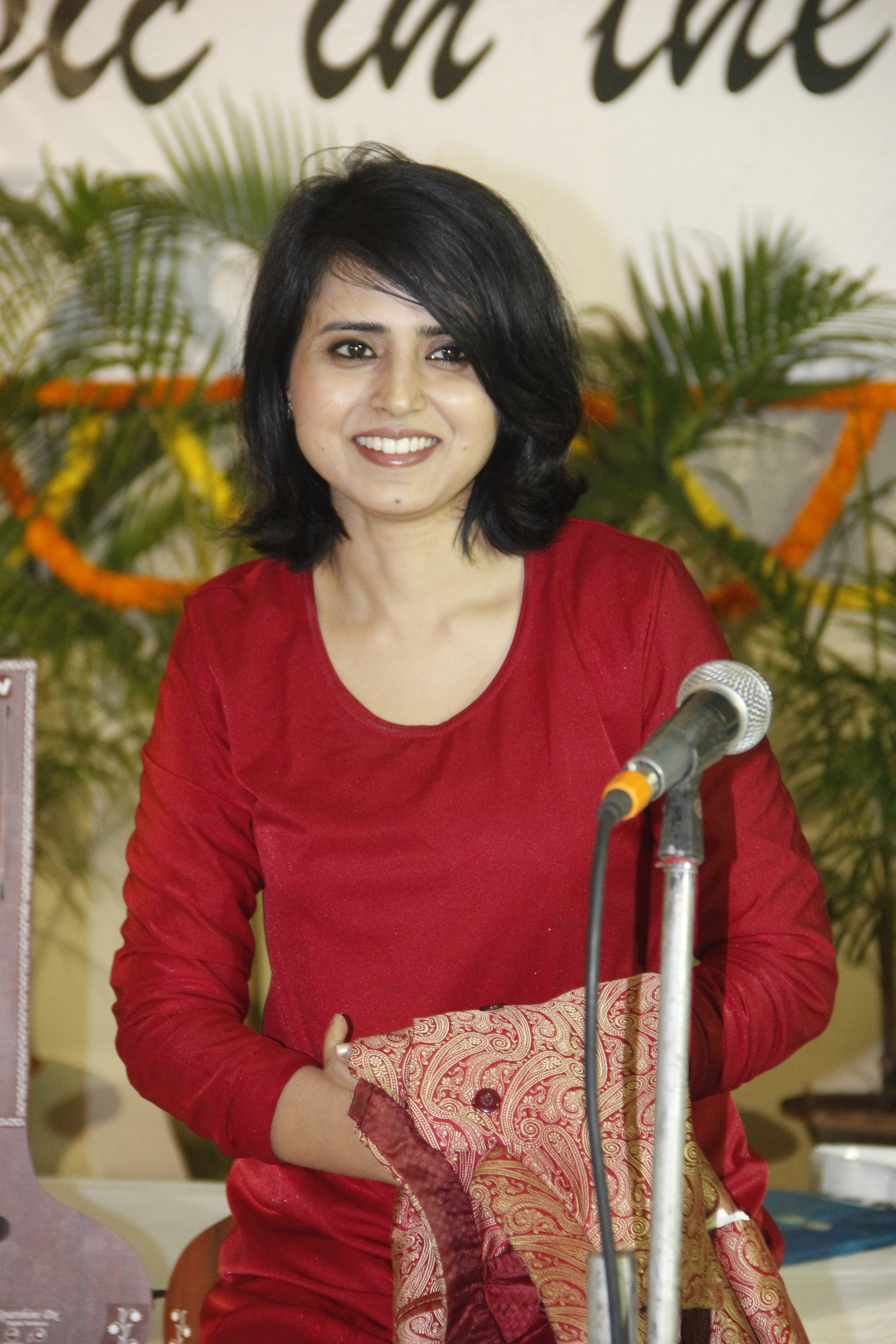
- Sniti Mishra at "Music in the Park" Indira Gandhi Park, Bhubaneswar on 18 December 2016

Background information
- Born: Sniti Mishra; Bolangir, Odisha
- Genres: Hindustani music, playback
- Occupation: Singer
- Instrument: Vocals
- Years active: 2010–present
- Website: snitimishra.com

Sniti Mishra is an Indian singer. She is a trained vocalist in Hindustani classical music who appeared for the first time in Zee TV musical reality show, Sa Re Ga Ma Pa Singing Superstar. She had been associated with Indo-Swedish Fusion jazz band Mynta. She has also worked with the percussionist Sivamani and Grammy Award- nominated jazz musician-keyboardist Louis Banks. She has performed classical and fusion concerts in India and worldwide. She was honored with 'Baji Rout Samman' for the year 2016 by Utkala Cultural Association, IIT Bombay. Sniti has her formal education in Economics and pursued her MBA in Finance and Control.

During her musical tour to the USA, she was invited to judge the Chicago Indian Icon and in September 2013, she was chosen as a Good Will Ambassador for a global charity Combat Blindness International. Sniti has been invited to perform Hindustani Khayal in the most prestigious Dover Lane Music Conference,(2026), Tansen Samaroh, 2023 and Abhibadan Sawai Gandharva Bhimsen Festival in 2022. She also represented India among nine countries in an international event organized by Government of India and the national broadcaster Doordarshan (DD) in 2022.

Mishra has lent her voice to a Tamil movie Maaveeran Kittu under the music composition of D. Imman. Mishra has also earned fame and became a household name for singing Marathi Classical and Kashmiri songs. Her latest kashmiri folk song "Harmukh Bartal" is taken by the popular webseries The Family Man (Indian TV series) starred Manoj Bajpayee.

== Early life ==
Sniti Mishra was born and raised in Balangir, a district in the western part of Odisha, into an Odia Brahmin family. She is the younger of two children.

Mishra’s initial training in Hindustani classical music began under Guru Shri Raghunath Sahoo, a disciple of Dr. Damodar Hota of the Gwalior Gharana, and studied music (Visharad) in Hindustani Khayal. She also studied for a master's degree in Business Administration in Finance and Control (FC) from the Institute of Management and Information Science, Bhubaneswar, graduating in 2012.
