= Balika Vadhu 2 =

Indian social drama series

- Also known as: Balika Vadhu - Kachchee Umar ke Pakke Rishte; Balika Vadhu - Anandi ka Naya Safar
- Genre: Drama
- Written by: Purnendu Shekhar; Gajra Kottari; Usha Dikshit; Rajesh Dubey; Shipra Arora; Lakshmi Jaikumar; Yash Sharda
- Directed by: Pradeep Yadhav
- Creative director: Aman Jain
- Starring: Shivangi Joshi; Randeep Rai; Samridh Bawa
- Country of origin: India
- Original language: Hindi
- No. of seasons: 1
- No. of episodes: 167

Production
- Producers: Sunjoy Waddhwa; Comall Sunjoy W.
- Production locations: Rajasthan; Gujarat; Mumbai
- Cinematography: Sandeep Yadav; Rajan Gupta
- Camera setup: Multi-camera
- Running time: 15-20 minutes
- Production company: Sphere Origins

Original release
- Network: Colors TV (2021–2022); Voot (2022)
- Release: 9 August 2021 – 25 February 2022

Related
- Balika Vadhu

Balika Vadhu 2 (transl. The Child Bride 2) is an Indian dramatic television series that aired on Colors TV from 9 August 2021 to 25 February 2022 and on Voot from 28 February 2022 to 29 March 2022. It is a reboot of the long-running series Balika Vadhu. Produced by Sphere Origins, its cast includes Shivangi Joshi, Randeep Rai, and Samridh Bawa.

== Plot ==
Set in the village of Deogarh, the series follows the life of Anandi, a young girl unknowingly married off to Jigar, the son of her father's best friend, Premji, due to longstanding family ties and village customs. Initially unaware of her marriage, Anandi gradually discovers the truth and struggles against deeply rooted traditions, particularly the practice of child marriage.

As she matures, Anandi aspires to pursue education and independence, which brings her into conflict with Jigar, who believes her only role is to be his wife. Anand, a progressive and empathetic NRI, enters her life and supports her ambitions, leading to a bond that causes jealousy and tension with Jigar.

Facing societal pressures and emotional turmoil, Anandi seeks an annulment of her child marriage. With the support of Anand and a legal battle, she succeeds in ending the marriage. Although Anand confesses his love, Anandi chooses to prioritize her personal growth and responsibilities over romance.

Years later, Anandi runs a successful boutique while caring for a paralyzed Jigar and his family. As Anand returns to India, unresolved emotions and hidden family secrets continue to unfold, shaping Anandi’s journey toward self-empowerment and identity.

== Cast ==
=== Main ===
- Shivangi Joshi as Anandi Bhujariya Rawal: Ratan and Khimji's daughter; Kalpesh's sister; Jigar's ex-wife; Anand's wife; Vijayta's mother (2021-2022)
  - Shreya Patel as Child Anandi Bhujariya (2021)
- Randeep Rai as Anand Rawal: Sheela and Mehul's son; Bhairavi's step-son; Diya's half-brother; Anandi's husband; Vijayta's father (2021-2022)
  - Krish Chauhan as Teenage Anand Rawal (2021)
- Samridh Bawa as Jigar Anjariya: Sejal and Premji's elder son; Gopal's brother; Anandi's ex-husband (2021-2022)
  - Vansh Sayani as Teenage Jigar Anjariya (2021)

=== Recurring ===
==== Bhujariya family ====
- Anshul Trivedi as Khimji Bhujariya: Ratan's husband; Kalpesh and Anandi's father; Vijayta's grandfather (2021)
- Riddhi Nayak Shukla as Ratan Sangwan Bhujariya: Pawan's sister; Khimiji's wife; Kalpesh and Anandi's mother; Vijayta's grandmother (2021)
- Chirag Kukreja as Kalpesh Bhujariya: Khimji and Ratan's son; Anandi's brother (2021)

==== Rawal family ====
- Vimarsh Roshan as Mehul Rawal: Sheela and Bhairavi's husband; Anand and Diya's father; Vijayta's grandfather (2021-2022)
- Unknown as Sheela Rawal: Mehul's first wife; Anand's mother; Diya's step-mother; Vijayta's grandmother (2021-2022)
- Manasi Salvi as Bhairavi Rawal: Mehul's second wife; Diya's mother; Anand's step-mother; Vijayta's step-grandmother (2021-2022)
- Ankita Bahuguna as Diya Rawal: Mehul and Bhairavi's daughter; Sheela's step-daughter; Anand's half-sister; Vikrant's ex-wife (2021-2022)
- Unknown as Vijayta Rawal: Anand and Anandi's daughter (2022)

==== Anjariya family ====
- Mehul Buch as Devraj Anjariya: Dharamraj's brother; Bhanumati's husband; Diwali and Premji's father; Kanak, Jigar and Gopal's grandfather (2021)
- Meenakshi Verma as Bhanumati "Bhanu" Anjariya a.k.a. Bhanu: Devraj's wife; Diwali and Premji's mother; Kanak, Jigar and Gopal's grandmother (2021)
- Sunny Pancholi / Manu Malik as Premji Anjariya: Devraj and Bhanumati's son; Diwali's brother; Sejal's husband; Jigar and Gopal's father (2021) / (2021-2022) (Dead)
- Shiju Kataria / Payal Shukla as Sejal Anjariya: Premji's widow; Jigar and Gopal's mother (2021) / (2021-2022)
- Arisht Jain as Gopal Anjariya: Premji and Sejal's younger son; Jigar's brother (2021)
- Unknown as Dharmaraj Anjariya: Devraj's brother; Gomati's husband; Diwali and Premji's uncle; Kanak, Jigar and Gopal's granduncle (2021) (Dead)
- Ketki Dave as Gomati Devi "Madi Baa" Anjariya: Dharmaraj's wife; Diwali and Premji's aunt; Kanak, Jigar and Gopal's grandaunt (2021-2022)

==== Singh Chauksia family ====
- Seema Mishra as Diwali Anjariya Singh Chauksia: Devraj and Bhanumati's daughter; Premji's sister; Lakhan's wife; Kanak's mother (2021)
- Chandan Rai as Lakhan Singh Chauksia: Diwali's husband; Kanak's father (2021)
- Trupti Mishra as Kanak Singh Chauksia: Lakhan and Diwali's daughter: Jigar and Gopal's cousin; Madhav's ex-girlfriend (2021)

==== Sangwan family ====
- Shekar Choudhary as Pawan Sangwan: Ratan's brother; Leela's husband (2021)
- Rashmi Gupta as Leela Jain Sangwan: Mitali's granddaughter; Pawan's wife (2021)

=== Others ===
- Sagar Parekh as Madhav Jha: Kanak's ex-boyfriend (2021)
- Kumkum Das as Mitali Jain a.k.a. Mitaben: Leela's grandmother (2021)
- Vikas Grover as Vikrant: Diya's ex-husband (2021–2022)
- Pratiksha Rai as Kiara (2021)
- Melanie Pais as Dr. Sharada (2021)
- Sharhaan Singh as Varun (2022)
- Ahmad Harhash as Premal Choudhary: Diya's girlfriend (2021–2022)

== Production ==
=== Development ===
The reboot of Balika Vadhu was confirmed in early 2021. Casting was halted in April 2021 due to an imposed lockdown in Maharashtra because of the pandemic, and it resumed in June 2021. The teaser was released officially on 27 June 2021. The first promo was released on 18 July 2021 featuring Shreya Patel and confirming the premiere date.

=== Casting ===
In early-2020, Toral Rasputra and Surekha Sikri was once planned to be in this show, along with Shakti Anand, the makers decided to introduce a time-leap in the show. Actress Shivangi Joshi was cast to play adult Anandi. Kinshuk Vaidya was earlier considered to play adult Jigar. However, the makers roped-in Randeep Rai to play the role opposite Joshi. Actor Samridh Bawa was cast to play adult Jigar in the show. The show was shifted to OTT platform Voot from 28 February 2022 and was replaced by Swaran Ghar.

=== Filming ===
The filming began in June 2021 where some initial sequences were shot at Rajasthan. The series is mainly filmed at the sets in Mumbai, Maharashtra.
