= 18.11: A Code of Secrecy =

2014 Indian Hindi action film

- Film poster
- Directed by: Md. Mohibul Haque
- Written by: Md. Mohibul Haque Shree Dhar Dubey
- Produced by: Begum Merina Haque
- Starring: Rehal Khan; Gulshan Grover; Prem Chopra; Mukesh Tiwari; Nipon Goswami; Asrani
- Cinematography: Pratik Deora
- Edited by: Sharad Salvi
- Music by: Music Director: Jaan Nissar Lone; Score: Salil Amrute
- Production company: Future Work Studio
- Distributed by: Ultimate Pictures Ltd.
- Release date: 13 June 2014
- Running time: 126 minutes
- Country: India
- Language: Hindi

18.11: A Code of Secrecy is a 2014 Indian Hindi action film written and directed by Mohibul Haque and Produced by Merina Hauque. Under the banner of Ultimate Pictures, the film stars Rehal Khan, Gulshan Grover and Mukesh Tiwari in the lead roles. The movie has been listed as one of the worst Hindi movies ever by many critics.

== Cast ==
- Rehal Khan as Rehal Khan
- Bridgette Irani as Suhana
- Gulshan Grover as Captain Rack
- Prem Chopra as Gogoi
- Mukesh Tiwari as Kuldeep Sharma
- Nipon Goswami as Rehal's Father
- Asrani as Habilder-Paholwan
- Sameer Ali Khan as Martial Arts Instructor
- Raja Borbhuyan as Chhotu Hawaldar
- Joshizul Haque as D
- Sujata Khound as Commando Vijay Lakshmi
- Jishan Khan as Commando Shamim Khan
- Suraj Kumar Kalita as Commando Pritam
- Deepa Sethi as Tanyay
- Md as Mehatabul Haque

== Production ==
This film was produced by Merina Haque. Gulshan Grover visit Assam first time for this movie shooting. This film was shot in Dhubri, Hajo, Guwahati and Shillong.

== Soundtrack ==
18.11 A Code Secrecy

Soundtrack album by Jaan Nissar Lone
- Released: 2014
- Recorded: 2014
- Genre: Feature film soundtrack
- Length: 29:16
- Language: Hindi
- Label: Worldwide Records
- Producer: Merina Haque

The music of 18.11 A Code of secrecy is composed by Jaan Nissar Lone. Lyrics were by Tanveer Ghazi & Sahil Fatehpuri.

Tracklist
No.	Title	Lyrics	Artist(s)	Length
1.	"Andhi Jaisi Rafter Hai"	Tanveer Ghazi	Shail Hada	3:41
2.	"Eagle Sa Ego Hai"		Shaan	4:17
3.	"Mera Yaar Thanedaar"		Rani Hazarika,	4:07
4.	"Yeh Zameen"		Kunal Ganjawala, Suzanne D'Mello, Nadeem Al Balushi	6:27
5.	"Allah Teri Kya Shaan Hai"		Kamaal Khan, Jaan Nissar Lone	7:20
Total length:				29:16

== Awards and nominations ==
Award	Category	Recipients and nominees	Result	Ref.
7th Mirchi Music Awards	Song representing Sufi tradition	"Allah Teri Kya Shaan Hai"	Nominated	
