= Gaurav Pandey =

Indian actor

- Occupation: Actor
- Years active: 2014–present

Gaurav Pandey is an Indian actor who appears in Hindi films. He trained at Kreating Characters Acting School. He has appeared in ads for brands including Colgate Plax, OLX, KFC, Sprite and Volkswagen. His first film appearance was in the supporting role of Shaunty in Humpty Sharma Ki Dulhania (2014). In 2015, Pandey appeared in the Y Films web series A Man's World. He also appeared in the 2016 Remo D'Souza film A Flying Jatt.

== Filmography ==
=== Films ===
Year	Title	Role	Notes
2014	Humpty Sharma Ki Dulhania	Shonty	
2016	A Flying Jatt	Rohit	
2017	Badrinath Ki Dulhania	Gurmeet	
2021	Saroj Ka Rishta	Shantanu	
2023	Tumse Na Ho Payega	Sharad Malhotra "Mal"	
2025	Tu Meri Main Tera Main Tera Tu Meri	Luv	

=== Web series ===
Year	Title	Role	Notes
2015	Man's World	Kiran	
2017	Yo ke Hua BRO	Mahender	
2019	Fuh Se Fantasy	Rhyan/Ankur	
2023	The Trial	Dheeraj	
