= Cash (2007 film) =

2007 Indian film by Anubhav Sinha

- Theatrical release poster
- Directed by: Anubhav Sinha
- Written by: Vinay-Yash
- Produced by: Sohail Maklai; Anish Ranjan
- Starring: Ajay Devgn; Suniel Shetty; Esha Deol; Riteish Deshmukh; Zayed Khan; Shamita Shetty; Dia Mirza
- Cinematography: Ravi Walia
- Edited by: Amarjeet Singh
- Music by: Songs: Vishal–Shekhar; Background Score: Ranjit Barot
- Production companies: Seven Entertainment Ltd. Sohail Maklai Entertainment Pvt Ltd; ASP White
- Distributed by: Adlabs
- Release date: 3 August 2007
- Running time: 133 minutes
- Country: India
- Language: Hindi
- Budget: ₹32 crore
- Box office: ₹29.30 crore

Cash is a 2007 Indian Hindi-language heist film directed by Anubhav Sinha. The film stars an ensemble cast consisting of Ajay Devgn, Suniel Shetty, Ritesh Deshmukh, Zayed Khan, Esha Deol, Shamita Shetty and Dia Mirza. The film was released on 3 August 2007.

== Plot ==
The film begins with Dhananjay "Danny" Jhumbevalkar, also known as DJ, meeting Rhea—whose real name is Preeti—on an airplane. They quickly strike up a friendship. During the flight, Danny recounts a historical tale about a legendary diamond. He explains that it was discovered by a South Indian miner in 1836 and presented to his king, who later gifted it to a British viceroy. Tragically, the ship carrying the viceroy to Britain sank, and the diamond was lost at sea.

A century later, a fisherman discovered the diamond and gave it to his master. The master divided the stone into three separate pieces, distributing them among his three sons. Each piece met a different fate: one was lost through gambling, the second was seized by a general, and the third was lost following the murder of the youngest brother.

By 1994, two of the three diamonds were recovered and housed in a Belgian museum. The location of the third remained a mystery until a Gujarati diamond dealer contacted Shanaya, a security manager at the South African High Commission. The dealer was subsequently robbed of the diamond by thugs in a pre-planned car accident. Meanwhile, a notorious criminal known as "The Uncle" orchestrates a heist, tasking his henchman, Angad, with stealing the two diamonds from the Belgian museum.

The Uncle successfully retrieves the two diamonds from the museum, but he soon realizes he needs the third stone to complete the set. He discovers that the third diamond is in the possession of the same group of goons who hijacked it from the Gujarati dealer.

Danny, who is revealed to be a professional thief rather than just a casual traveler, has been tracking the diamonds himself. He recruits Rhea (Preeti) and a team of specialists to intercept the stones before The Uncle can consolidate them. A high-stakes game of deception ensues, involving intricate heists, double-crosses, and a race against time across international borders.

As the plot unfolds, it is revealed that Danny and Shanaya share a past connection involving the very same diamonds. In the climactic finale, the various factions—Danny’s team, The Uncle’s gang, and the goons holding the third diamond—converge in a dangerous confrontation. Ultimately, Danny manages to outsmart his rivals, securing the diamonds while maintaining his cover. The film ends with Danny and Rhea successfully pulling off the ultimate heist, leaving their adversaries empty-handed as they disappear with the prize.

== Cast ==
- Ajay Devgn as Karan/Doc
- Suniel Shetty as Angad
- Riteish as Lucky
- Zayed Khan as Dhananjay "Danny" "DJ" Jhumbevalkar
- Esha Deol as Pooja
- Shamita Shetty as Inspector Shanaya
- Dia Mirza as Aditi Jhamwal
- Ayesha Takia as Rhea / Preeti

Additionally, Bruna Abdullah appears as a dancer in song "Rahem Kare."

== Production ==
Cash was primarily shot in Cape Town, South Africa.

The film consists of 20 minutes of animated segments. Sinha told Rediff.com, "While writing the film, I thought we should incorporate animation but we dropped the idea because of cost constraints, but after we returned from South Africa and saw the rushes, everyone suggested that animation should be included."

== Soundtrack ==
The soundtrack of the film was composed by Vishal–Shekhar. The song "Raham Kare" has been penned by Panchhi Jalonvi, and all other songs were penned by Vishal Dadlani.

According to the Indian trade website Box Office India, with around 12 lakh units sold, this film's soundtrack album was the year's ninth highest-selling.

| No. | Title | Performer(s) | Length |
|---|---|---|---|
| 1. | "Cash" (Theme Mix) | Sunidhi Chauhan, Vishal Dadlani, Shekhar Ravjiani | 5:01 |
| 2. | "Mind Blowing Mahiya" | Sunidhi Chauhan | 4:09 |
| 3. | "Na Pooch" | Sunidhi Chauhan, Vishal Dadlani | 4:51 |
| 4. | "Raham Kare" | Sunidhi Chauhan, Vishal Dadlani | 5:02 |
| 5. | "Naughty Naughty" | Anushka Manchanda | 3:41 |
| 6. | "Zara Bachke Jee" | Anushka Manchanda, Vishal Dadlani, Shekhar Ravjiani | 5:33 |
| 7. | "Cash" (Extended Mix) | Sunidhi Chauhan, Vishal Dadlani, Shekhar Ravjiani | 3:46 |

== Reception ==
=== Critical reception ===
Taran Adarsh of Bollywood Hungama rated the film 2 out of 5, writing, "On the whole, CASH has style, but rests on a thin plot and that is its biggest flaw. At the box-office, the film might attract the audience in its initial weekend, but a weak script will throw a spanner". Raja Sen of Rediff.com gave the film 1.5 out of 5, writing "Cash could have been a ride -- if only they paid half as much attention to the script as they did to the title song". Andy Webster of The New York Times gave the film negative review, writing, "Cash, for all its flash, leaves you hungry. But not for more".

Jyoti Kanyal of India Today in a retrospective review in 2020, called the film, "So bad it's good."
