= Shudra: The Rising =

2012 film by Sanjiv Jaiswal

- A Poster of Shudra — The Rising
- Directed by: Sanjiv Jaiswal
- Written by: Sanjiv Jaiswal (story & dialogue)
- Produced by: Sanjiv Jaiswal
- Starring: Shreedhar Dubey; Kirran Sharad; Praveen Baby
- Cinematography: Pratik Deora
- Edited by: Krishan Shukla
- Music by: Jaan Nissar Lone
- Release date: 19 October 2012
- Running time: 120 minutes
- Country: India
- Language: Hindi

Shudra: The Rising is a 2012 Indian Hindi-language film with a fictional storyline based on the caste system in ancient India. It is directed by Sanjiv Jaiswal and dedicated to Dr B. R. Ambedkar.

== Plot ==
Shudra: The Rising is set in the time of the Indus Valley civilization and has a storyline that concerns the caste system of ancient India.

The initial part narrates the arrival of the people of west Asia to India. They were of the Aryan race and they take over the local tribe and start controlling them. Finally a learned scholar, Manu Rishi, creates a caste system which classifies the local population as Shudras, who then suffer from cruel social rules. They are suppressed and exploited at every level of their lives by the upper caste people. The film shows various rules imposed on the Shudras such as walking with a bell around their ankles and a long leaf behind their back, and a pot hanging around their neck when the bell rings Brahmins got know that the lower caste are near them so upper caste can make distance from them.

== Cast ==
- Shreedhar Dubey as Badri
- Kirran Sharad as Sandhli
- Praveen Baby as Charna
- Aaref Rajput as Bala
- Gauri Shankar as Madhav
- Anurag Shukla as Raja Thakur
- Shabaz Baweja as Kartar Singh
- Mahesh Balraj as Bheru
- Priya Annatram as Badri's wife
- Shaji Chaudhry as Thakur
- Satyam Chauhan as Pandit
- Ankita as Arohi, Sandhli’s sister
- Habib Azmi as Baba
- Radha Srivastav as child Channa
- Sunder as Badri’s old father
- Sabita Singh as Jugni

== Production ==
Most of the movie was shot in the jungles on the outskirts of Lucknow.

The plot of the movie is inconsistent with historical evidence.

== Reception ==
A critic from The Times of India wrote, "Shudra attempts to overthrow the age-old caste system in India. Watch it, if you are still not enlightened enough on the issue". Komal Nahta wrote, "On the whole, Shudra – The Rising may be a well-made and well-enacted film but its commercial prospects are almost nil".
