= Yarwng =

- Directed by: Joseph Pulinthanath
- Screenplay by: Joseph Pulinthanath
- Produced by: Joseph Kizhakechennadu
- Music by: Bikash Roy Debbarma
- Production company: Don Bosco Sampari Pictures Tripura
- Release date: 4 September 2008 (Agartala)
- Running time: 95 minutes
- Country: India
- Language: Kokborok

Yarwng is a 2008 Kokborok feature film produced by Don Bosco Sampari Pictures Tripura, written and directed by Joseph Pulinthanath. The story of the 95-minute feature film revolves round the large-scale displacement which happened in Tripura state, in northeast India, when the newly built Dumbur dam (1970s) submerged huge areas of arable land in the fertile Raima valley about 40 years ago. The film won the first national film award for Tripura at the 56th National Film Awards in (2008)

== Plot summary ==
The protagonist, Sukurai, has just learnt that his wife Karmati had once been the fiancée of his jhum companion Wakhirai. Karmati says she and Wakhirai were to be married but on the night before their wedding a newly built dam submerged her village and separated them forever. Wakhirai moved out along with his family and his ailing father died on the way. Wakhirai tells Sukurai that his meeting Karmati is just a co-incidence. Sukurai, himself a victim of the same catastrophe, suggests a reunion between Karmati and Wakhirai. Karmati goes to Wakhirai’s house but finds him missing. But the poor woman is ready to face her destiny bravely and keeps waiting.

== Cast ==
- Meena Debbarma as Kormoti
- Nirmal Jamatia as Uakhirai
- Surabhi Debbarma
- Sushil Debbarma as Sukurai
- Debra Bimal Singh Debbarma
- Ainati Jasmine Debbarma
- Yathek Judharam Reang
- Grandpa Nikunja Molsom
- Ochai Manohar Jamatia
- Ochai’s Wife Padhirung Reang
- Choudhury Amulya Ratan Jamatia
- Choudhury’s wife Suchitra Debbarma
- Agent Madan Debbarma
- Agurai Galem Debbarma
- Mereng Rabindra Jamatia
- Thunta Nanda Hari Jamatia
- Kekli Krishna Chura Jamatia
- Moi Usha Debbarma
- Nobar Laldiga Molsom
- Berma Boy Mishan Debbarma
- Berma Boy’s Ma Buddhalaxmi Debbarma
- Agurai’s Wife Shantirung Reang
- Khumbarti Purnarung Reang
- Khumbarti’s Daughter Mari Reang
- Khumbarti’s son Vikas Reang
- Villager with Townsmen Pabiram Reang
- Soldiers Ajit Roga, Rabi Debbarma, Subudh Debbarma

== Themes ==
Yarwng depicts the lives of ordinary people striving to preserve their humanity in the face of abrupt social change and economic desperation. Yarwng is based on true events of displacement and resettlement problem of Indigenous Tripuri people caused by the Dumbor Hydel Power Project commissioned in 1976 by the Indian Government. The film examines the aftermath of the Dam construction over the confluence Raima-Saima River on the local people socio-economic, relationships and loss of home.

== Production ==
The film was produced by Joseph Kizhakechennadu and was directed by Father Joseph Pulinthanath. Both are priests of the Don Bosco mission and Yarwng was their second film. The film was partially funded by the Catholic Church in India. Filming in the Tripura district took one month.

== Award ==
The film won the Best Feature Film in Kokborok award at the 56th National Film Awards. The producer and director received their award from Indian president Pratibha Patil.
