= International Film Festival of Jammu & Kashmir =

International film festival

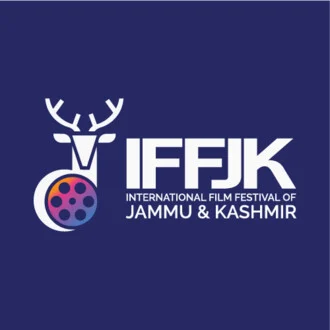
- Location: Jammu and Kashmir, India
- Founded: 2026
- Website: iffjk.org

The International Film Festival of Jammu & Kashmir (IFFJK) is the first international film festival in Jammu and Kashmir, scheduled to hold its inaugural edition from 7 to 10 September 2026 in Srinagar.

== Organisation ==
It is organised by the Directorate of Information and Public Relations (DIPR), Government of Jammu and Kashmir, in collaboration with the National Film Development Corporation of India (NFDC). On 24 July 2026, the chief minister of Jammu and Kashmir and Indian film maker Imtiaz Ali did the curtain raise of this upcoming Film festival.

== Films ==
The festival features Indian and international films across categories including feature films, documentaries and short films, along with industry discussions and related events.

The inaugural festival received 875 submissions from 50 countries.
