= Mathia (film) =

- Directed by: Joseph Pulinthanath
- Screenplay by: Joseph Pulinthanath
- Produced by: Fr. KJ Joseph
- Starring: Meena Debbarma; Jayanta Jamatia; Amulya Jamatia
- Cinematography: Sunil Lucas
- Edited by: Sunil Lucas
- Music by: Abhijit Basu
- Production company: Don Bosco Sampari Picture
- Distributed by: Don Bosco Sampari Pictures
- Release date: 2004
- Running time: 132 minutes
- Country: India
- Language: Kokborok

Mathia is a 2004 Indian Kokborok-language full-length feature film. It is written and directed by Joseph Pulinthanath and stars Meena Debbarma, Jayanta Jamatia and Amulya Jamaita.

== Synopsis ==
In a remote village of Tripura, a group of youth goes for cultivating huk(Jhum), singing along. They come across a house of a woman who is accused of being a Swkal(Witch). The villagers treat her in an unfriendly manner, forcing her to live in isolation outside the village, until a young man named Banthu from the same group falls in love with her, who had a view different from the society. He doesn't believe in societal stigma and superstitions such as a witch living among the people. Following his belief, he tries convincing that it is not Kwchwngti who is responsible for people dying natural deaths or deaths due to induced circumstances. However, Kwchwngti is framed by the villagers for all the misfortune that the village was confronted with. Thereafter, men are commissioned several times by the Choudhury of the village to kill Kwchwngti, who fled with Banthu from the village to a safe place. It was Banthu's rationale and love for her that saved her in the end from being buried alive by the villagers as a custom punishment for being a Swkal.

== Reception ==
=== Critical analysis ===
- In his seminal research, film scholar and filmmaker, Aloy Deb Barma referred to Pulinthanath's Mathia as a significant contribution to the constitution of an indigenous cinematic voice as the film addressed not just the issue of tribal language, but also that of mainstream Indian cinema's skewed and distorted portrayal of the indigenous communities of the Northeast India. The film, despite its technical drawbacks, has been positively received in the International Film and Television Festival of Neipoklanow, Poland for its realistic depiction of the culture and heritage of the tribal community in Tripura. The film is regarded as the first feature film of Tripura in Kokborok-language to receive critical acclaim.
- Anil Sarkar, a minister in the Tripura Government, stated, "Mathia has not only taken the Kokborok language to the international arena, but has made the people of the state proud". Jitendra Choudhuri, another minister in the Tripura Government, praised it as a "daring and welcome contribution to social change".

== Awards ==
- Best feature film award at the international film festival held in Warsaw from May 19 to 25, 2003. Mathia had been awarded the first prize in the feature film category for its "realistic depiction of the culture and heritage of a community in India".

== Soundtrack ==
Sl no.	Song	Singer	length	link
1	Phaibaidi Joto Bayarok	Jayanta Jamatia	4:30	YouTube
2	Khorang Khwlaike	Biswantah Debbarma & Manodevi Jamatia	3:20	YouTube

== Release ==
Mathia had its first official screening in an international cinema conference organised by Roopkala Kendra, an Indo-Italian project at Nandan, West Bengal in February 2003. It was also screened at the "International Film and Television Festival of Neipoklanow", Poland on May 21, 2003.
