= Siddhant Karnick =

Indian television actor

- Born: 15 March 1983 (age 43); Mumbai, Maharashtra, India
- Occupation: Actor
- Years active: 2004–present
- Spouse: Megha Gupta (m. 2016; div. 2020)

Siddhant Karnick (born 15 March 1983) is an Indian actor. He made his television debut playing Arjun Khanna in romantic teen drama show Remix (2004–2006) but gained popularity and became a household name with his portrayal of Rana Indravadhan Singh Deo in the award-winning television show Ek Tha Raja Ek Thi Rani (2015–2016). (Note: Rana Indravadhan Singh Deo was based on the real life of Maharaja Man Singh II.)

Karnick's other notable television shows include Mahi Way (2010), Rishta.com (2010), Pyaar Kii Ye Ek Kahaani (2010-2011), Kismat (2011), Aasman Se Aage (2012) and Mere Sai (2018). He also appeared in episodic roles in various shows such as Yeh Hai Aashiqui (2013), Savdhaan India (2013), MTV Big F (2017), Kaal Bhairav Rahasya (2018). Apart from television shows he has appeared in few films such as Fast Forward (2009), Yeh Mera India (2009), Blue Oranges (2009), Lafangey Parindey (2010) and Listen Amaya (2013). In 2020, he appeared in the film Thappad, in the role of Viraj Sabharwal, which was co-produced and directed by Anubhav Sinha.

== Life ==
Karnick was born on 15 March 1983 in Mumbai to Kiran Karnick. In August 2016, he married fellow actress Megha Gupta. However, reports of trouble in their marriage first surfaced in 2019. Later, the couple decided to live separately and soon declared their separation. Their divorce was finalised in March 2020.

=== Youtube as a hobby ===
Karnick is a Motorcycle enthusiast who shares his experiences through vlogs. He loves to share his riding journeys with people, and to support this hobby, he started his YouTube channel - Siddhant Karnick. He believes in exploring and learning while travelling. He is also a passionate photographer and loves to edit and conceptualize most of his content by himself.

== Career ==
He made his screen debut with the show Remix (2004–2006) in the role of Arjun Khanna, which was produced by Goldie Behl and Shrishti Behl Arya. Then he went onto star in many television shows like Jhoome Jiiya Re (2008), Mahi Way (2010), Rishta.com (2010). In 2011, he appeared in teen drama show Pyaar Kii Ye Ek Kahaani (2010-2011) as Siddharth Raichand, his performance was praised in the show. After wrapping up Pyaar Kii Ye Ek Kahaani, he was mostly seen in recurring or in episodic roles like Kismat (2011), Aasman Se Aage (2012), Yeh Hai Aashiqui (2013), Savdhaan India (2013), Gustakh Dil (2014). Then in 2015, Karnick returned as lead in period drama show Ek Tha Raja Ek Thi Rani, along with Drashti Dhami and Surekha Sikri. The Show was produced by Sujoy Wadhwa. He received praises from the audience and became as a household name. And after Karnick's exit from the show in 2016, he was seen again in episodic roles in MTV Big F (2017), Mere Sai (2018) and in Kaal Bhairav Rahasya Season 2 (2018).

Despite active in the Indian television industry, he was appearing in some short films and in small roles in bollywood films. He has done short films like The Mole (2008), The Au Revoir (2011) and Project 11 (2011). The Au Revoir was a French short film based in Mumbai, directed by Jean Louis Carrasco. He made his film debut with Fast Forward in 2009. Then he appeared in Yeh Mera India (2009), Blue Oranges (2009), Lafangey Parindey (2009) and Listen Amaya (2013).

Then in 2020, Karnick appeared in critically and commercially acclaimed film Thappad, starring Taapsee Pannu in lead. It was directed by Anubhav Sinha.

== Filmography ==
=== Television ===
| Show | Year | Role | Notes |
|---|---|---|---|
| Remix | 2004–2006 | Arjun Khanna | |
| Jhoome Jiiya Re | 2008 | Gaurav | |
| Mahi Way | 2010 | Ishaan Singh Ahluwalia | |
| Rishta.com | 2010 | Gaurav Kapoor | |
| Pyaar Kii Ye Ek Kahaani | 2010–2011 | Siddharth Mehra/Raichand | |
| Kismat | 2011 | Madhav Merchant | |
| Aasman Se Aage | 2012 | Akshat Verma | |
| Yeh Hai Aashiqui | 2013 | Karan | |
| Savdhaan India | 2013 | Captain Karan | |
| Gustakh Dil | 2014 | Sagar Khurana | |
| Savdhaan India | 2014 | Samar | |
| Ek Tha Raja Ek Thi Rani | 2015–2016 | Rana Indravadhan Singh Deo | |
| MTV Big F | 2017 | Sameer Sen | |
| Mere Sai | 2018 | Ganpat Rao | |
| Kaal Bhairav Rahasya Season 2 | 2018 | Yuvraj Yashvardhan Singh | Cameo |

=== Web series ===
| Show | Year | Role | Notes |
|---|---|---|---|
| Potluck | 2021–present | Aalim | |
| Human | 2022 | Ravish | |
| Modern Love: Mumbai | 2022 | Vikram | |
| Made in Heaven | 2023 | Anik Jain | Season 2 |

=== Films ===
| Year | Film | Role | Notes |
|---|---|---|---|
| 2008 | The Mole | The Moustache | Short film |
| 2009 | Fast Forward | Vicky | |
| 2009 | Yeh Mera India | Jatin | |
| 2009 | Blue Oranges | Aditya Mehra | |
| 2010 | Lafangey Parindey | TV show's anchor | |
| 2011 | The Au Revoir | | Short film |
| 2011 | Project 11 | Pinatubo gamer | Short film |
| 2013 | Listen Amaya | Raghav | |
| 2020 | Thappad | Viraaj Sabharwal | |
| 2021 | Und Morgen Seid Ihr Tot | Nazarjan | Swiss film |
| 2023 | Adipurush | Vibhishana | |
| 2023 | Animal | Varun | Hindi film |
