= Savdhaan India =

Indian crime television series (2017-2024)

- Also known as: Savdhan India – Darr Kar Nahi Datt Kar; Crime Alert; Criminal Decoded
- Genre: Crime fiction thriller
- Created by: Ajit Thakur, Anirban Bhattacharyya
- Written by: Jay Verma; Manish Shrivastava; Amitava Mitra; Mayank Vohra; Anirban Bhattacharyya
- Directed by: Ajay Veermal; Anirban Bhattacharyya
- Starring: Sushant Singh; Gaurav Chopra; Mohnish Behl; Pooja Gaur; Hiten Tejwani; Nivaan Sen; Sidharth Shukla; Divya Dutta; Saurabh Raj Jain; Sakshi Tanwar; Karmveer Choudhary; Sanjay Gagnani; Mohit Malik; Sanjay Suri; Ankit Bathla; Prince Sharmaa
- Country of origin: India
- Original language: Hindi
- No. of episodes: 3,374

Production
- Running time: 50 minutes
- Production companies: RowdyRascal; Endemol India; Keylight Production; Saregama India Ltd; Franklin Pictures Pvt. Ltd; Keytalent; Baba Arts; Flying Turtle; Director's Kut Productions; Sri Motion Pictures

Original release
- Network: Life OK
- Release: 23 April 2012 – 27 August 2017
- Network: Star Bharat
- Release: 28 August 2017 – 25 May 2024

Savdhaan India – India Fights Back (transl. Attention India! – India Fights Back) is an Indian Hindi-language crime show currently broadcasting on Star Bharat. It was created by Ajit Thakur, Anirban Bhattacharyya The series is hosted by Ashutosh Rana, Tisca Chopra, Sushant Singh, Gaurav Chopra, Mohnish Behl, Pooja Gaur, Saurabh Raj Jain, Shivani Tomar, Pratyusha Banerjee, Hiten Tejwani, Divya Dutta, Sidharth Shukla and Mohit Malik across multiple seasons. It presents dramatized versions of real-life crimes in India and of the struggles of the victims to get justice for their sufferings.

Initially, the series aired as Crime Alert on Life OK. A rebooted version of the series called Savdhaan India – India Fights Back began broadcasting on Life OK on 23 July 2012. Versions of the program (focusing on a particular Indian state/city) have also aired as Savdhaan India – Maharashtra Fights Back, hosted by Shreyas Talpade, Savdhaan India – Mumbai Fights Back, hosted by Atul Kulkarni, Savdhaan India – Punjab Fights Back hosted by saurabh raj jain and Savdhaan India – U.P Fights Back hosted by pooja gaur. The show continued to air on replacement channel of Life OK which is STAR Bharat from 28 August.

== Series overview ==
Series	Episode	Series premiere	Series ending	Channel	Host(s)
Savdhaan India – India Fights Back/ Savdhaan India – Delhi Fights Back/ Savdhaan India – Maharashtra Fights Back/ Savdhaan India – Mumbai Fights Back/ Savdhaan India – Punjab Fights Back/ Savdhaan India – U.P Fights Back	2,354	23 April 2012	27 August 2017	Life OK	Sushant Singh, Sakshi Tanwar, Mohnish Behl, Pooja Gor, Gaurav Chopra, Hiten Tejwani, Sidharth Shukla, Divya Dutta, Mohit Malik, Amar Upadhyay
Savdhaan India: Darr Kar Nahin Dat Kar	742	28 August 2017	5 January 2021	Star Bharat	Sushant Singh
Saavdhan India – Special Crime Series	35	29 July 2019	13 September 2019	Star Bharat	
Savdhaan India – F.I.R	31	6 January 2021	17 February 2021	Star Bharat	Police Department Role
Savdhaan India – Criminal Decoded	137	26 September 2023	2 March 2024	Star Bharat	Sushant Singh
Savdhaan India - Apni Khaki	75	4 March 2024	25 May 2024	Star Bharat	

== Cast ==
- Cast arranged according to alphabetical order

=== A ===
- Ananya Agarwal as Ruchi Sharma (Episode 522)
- Abhishek Singh Rajput as Kartik (Episode 43)
- Anjali Abrol as Aditi Mishra (Episode 556) / Maya (Episode 736) / Piya (Episode 946) / Janvi (Episode 1127) / Keerti (Episode 1185) / Dr. Vasudha (Episode 1281) / Nivedita (Episode 1354) / Shikha Gagnani (Episode 1463)
- Amit Behl as Pandit Jamunadas (Episode 2357)
- Ahsaas Channa as Bela, School Student (Episode 534) / Suhana (Episode 749) / Deepti Agarwal, Journalism College Student (Episode 895) / Divya (Episode 1141) / Neena, Board Exam Candidate (Episode 1200)
- Aastha Chaudhary as Geeta Joshi (Episode 2) / Priya Ajay Mishra (Episode 169)
- Amita Choksi as Shalmali (Episode 1927)
- Amit Dua as Dhananjay Thakur, Rapist (Episode 534)
- Anil Dhawan as Omveer (Episode 1669)
- Ahmad Harhash as Asad Khan (Episode 3000)
- Aashka Goradia as Asma (Episode 1068)
- Additi Gupta as Razia (Episode 787)
- Amrapali Gupta as Jyoti (Episode 90)
- Amin Hajee as Munshiji (Episode 2121)
- Alihassan Turabi as Ravi (Episode 471) / Episode 882 / Pankaj (Episode 1128) / Dr. Deepak (Episode 1468) / Shreeram (Episode 1797)
- Adi Irani as Kishorilal (Episode No 231) / Surinder, Mental Patient (Episode 900) / Sukumar, Building Material Supplier (Episode 1103) / Mamaji (Episode 1163) / Ranvijay (Episode No 1293) / Sagar (Episode No 1629) / Mahesh (Dual Role) (Episode 1787)
- Amardeep Jha as Mrs. Briganza (Episode 218) / Bhagwatidevi Narayan (Episode 585) / Narayani (Episode 1111)
- Aalisha Panwar as Kriti
- Ajay Purkar as Police Inspector Sadanand Darekar (Episode 66)
- Ajay Trehan as Kantilal Vaid (Episode 1824)
- Aashish Kaul as Mani Bhushan (Episode 450) / Ramen Sharma (Episode 522) / Advocate Vinay Salaskar (Episode 616) / Varun Khanna (Episode 789) / Abhinav (Episode 841) / Aashish (Episode 1422) / Amit (Episode 1694) / Aashish (Episode 1742) / Lakshman Singh Shekhawat (Episode 1890) / Mr. Gupta (Episode 1983)
- Adaa Khan as Sneha Mulle / Pooja Saxena (Episode 425) / Malati Anmol Shah (Episode 1118)
- Alam Khan as Bhulla, Dumb Child (Episode 707)
- Aleeza Khan as Meera (Episode 81) / Veena Sharma (Episode 175) / Rupa Sharma (Episode 588) / Divya (Episode 826) / Geetinder, Geet (Episode 877) / Meghna (Episode 1118) / Anisha (Episode 1237) / Poonam (Episode 1392) / Bharati (Episode 1521) / Ashima (Episode 2271) / Vinita (Episode 2150)
- Aanchal Khurana as Priya (Episode 742) / Supriya (Episode 1052) / Gayatri Anmol Shah (Episode 1118) / Rashi Prashant Pandey (Episode 1254) / Pragya (Episode 1319) / Minu (Episode 1336) / Kiran (Episode 1506) / Sanika (Episode 1619) / Rajjo (Episode 2393).
- Ahmed Khan Society Secretary (1871)
- Ankit Bathla as Shiva Agnihotri
- Ankit Mishra as Anurag (Episode 2025)
- Ankit Mohan as Rahul, Photographer (Episode 324) / Samar (Episode 366)
- Aarti Nagpal as Sunaina (Episode 239)
- Akshaya Naik as Niharika (Episode 2293)
- Lankesh Bhardwaj as Police Inspector
- Ankur Nayyar as Sikh Police Inspector (Episode 47) / Prince Adhiraj Singh (Episode 664) / Rana Rao (Episode 1278)
- Apurva Nemlekar as Sushma Deshmukh (Episode 2145) / Jyoti, Train Passenger (Episode 2199)
- Amrita Prakash as Naina (Episode 1236) / Anshi (Episode 2174)
- Aruna Sangal as (Episode 1907)
- Amit Sarin as Karan (Episode 504)
- Ankita Sharma as (Episode 460)
- Anurag Sharma (actor) as Vinod (Episode 603)
- Akshay Sethi as Prateek (Episode 36) / Rohan (Episode 65) / Nirmal (Episode 190) / Rohit (Episode 374) / Rohit (Episode 528) / Aryan Joshi (Episode 607) / Nikhil Chaddha (Episode 665) / Vikram (Episode 697) / Sandeep (Episode 729) / Deepak (Episode 806) / Episode 954 / Raman (Episode 1039) / Amol (Episode 1360) / Episode 1519 / Sanket (Episode 1667) / Dr. Brijesh (Episode 1734) / Episode 2324 / Amar (Episode 2693) / Episode 86 / Avdesh (Episode 195)
- Amit Singh as Pratap (Episode 61)
- Anshul Singh as / Ravi (Episode 617) / Rahul (Episode 650) / Deven (Episode 743) / Vikram Singh (Episode 886) / Tej (Episode 1217) / Pratham (Episode 1261) / Ankur (Episode 1875) / Ravi (Episode 2398)
- Anushka Singh as Amandeep Kaur (Episodes 65 and 66) / Uma Devi (Episode 41) / Archana Arvind Gupta (Episode 182) / Suman (Episode 763) / Shraddha Sharma (Episode 1352) / Manisha (Episode 1561) / Shilpi (Episode 1628) / Amit's wife (Episode 1694) / Dr. Madhu (Episode 1776)
- Amit Varma as Manish Joglekar (Episode 353) / Dev (Episode No 1594)
- Aman Verma as Inspector Rajendra Mishra (Episode 1065) / Mahesh (Episode 2162)
- Akanksha Sareen as Geet (Episode 1507) / Sheetal (Episode 2355)
- Abbas Ghaznavi as (Episode 1511) / Rahul (Episode 1945) / Shantanu (Episode 2228) / Arun (Episode 2320) / Sonu (Episode 2403)
- Anjali Rana as Shashi (Episode 491) / Meghna (Episode 709) / Neha (Episode 1006)
- Anuya Y Bhagwat as Ganga (Episode 207) / Uma (Episode 479) / Tina (Episode 1505) / Meet (Episode 2312)
- Amita Yadav as Neha (Episode 1492)
- Aashish Mehrotra as Manoj (Episode 10)
- Alefia Kapadia as Niyati (Episode 1067) / Divya (Episode 1245) / Rekha (Episode 1407) / Margi (Episode 1582) / Sarika (Episode 1677)
- Aman Sandhu as Sandhya (Episode 1810) / Sushma (Episode 2388)
- Asit Redij as Fauji Kaka (Episode 1810)

=== B ===
- Beena Banerjee as Mala Aunty (Episode 2084)
- Baby Farida as RajLaxmi, Mother-in-Law (Episode 1181) / Ratna Rastogi, Blind Old lady (Episode 2251)
- Birbal as Mukhiya (Sarpanch) (Episode 158) / (Episode 420)
- Bhumika Gurung as Kavita (Episode 3305)
- Brij Gopal as Daroga Joginder (Episode 1542)
- Bharti Kumeria as Mehak (Episode 1807)
- Bobby Pervez as Army Major Jaideep Singh (Episode 2326)
- Bhawna Barthwal as Shobha (Episode 275) / Amrit (Episode 1493)
- Bakul Thakkar as Phillip, Psychotic Father (Episode 188)
- Browney Prasher as 24 Karat Baba, Fraud Spiritual Guru (Episode 2026)

=== C ===
- Chaitanya Choudhury as Captain Vikram (Episode 804)
- Chetan Hansraj as ACP Abhijeet (Episode 1118)
- Chandan Madan as Satish (Episode 265) / Harvinder (Episode 521) / Shekhar (Episode 727)/ Sanjeev (Episode 759) / Amit (Episode 1618) / Harmeet (Episode 1707) / Ankit (Episode 2129)
- Chandrachur Singh as Akshay (Episode 477)
- Chandrika Saha as Meenakshi (Episode 1158) / Sonal (Episode 1444) / Sonia Pereira (Episode 1847)
- Chirag Dave as Dilip (Episode 226)

=== D ===
- Dishank Arora as Vikram Mehra (Episode 1558) / Manish Pandey (Episode 2039)
- Dalljiet Kaur as Shruti (Episode 31 - Episode 35)
- Dimple Kava as Kamala Bhabhi (Episode 329)
- Dinesh Kaushik as Nekichand Jain (Episode 1349) / OmPrakash Professor (Episode 1689) / Rastogi (Episode 1154) / Gupta (Episode 1898) / Episode 2287
- Dolly Minhas (Episode 784) / Damini Verma (Episode 1132) / (Episode 1657)
- Dolly Chawla (Episode 1629) Bakul
- Daljeet Soundh as Daadi, Thief (Episode 2390)
- Daya Shankar Pandey as Corrupt Politician Veer Singh (Episode 679)
- Dushyant Wagh as Bhaskar (Episode 783) / Sukesh, College Student (Episode 1134)
- Deepanshu Titoriya as Kartik (Episode 2372)
- Dincy Vira as Lali (Episode 844) / Tiya (Episode 2561)
- Dolphin Dwivedi as Manju (Episode 128) / Aditi (Episode 497) / Padmini / Bina (Episode 1711)
- Dolly Chawla as Pratiksha (Episode 1531) / Bakul (Episode 1629) / Sheetal (Episode 2113)
- Dhruvi Haldankar as Rajni (Episode 185) / Deepali (Episode 742) / (Episode 2359) / Dolly (Episode 2643)
- Devika Sharma as Rahila (Episode 741) / Chahal (Episode 1006)

=== E ===
- Emir Shah as Gippy (Season 6 Episode 5) / Vicky (Season 7 Episode 4)
- Ekta Tiwari as Ratna (Episode 674)

=== F ===
- Falguni Rajani as Bhagyashree (Episode 1224)
- Falaq Naaz as Manisha (Episode 36) / Rehana Hussain (Episode 201) / Naina (Episode 251) / Gauri (Episode 297)

=== G ===
- Gajendra Chauhan as Baba Anand, Fraud Spiritual Guru (Episode 259)
- Girish Jain as Vilas Patil, Auto Driver (Episode 383) / Ratan Narayan (Episode 585) / Police Inspector Shivendra Duggal (Episode 835) / Kishore, Movers and Packers Delivery Man (Episode 912)/ (Episode 2010)
- Gunn Kansara as Geeta (Episode 1657) / Amrita Verma (Episode 1789)
- Geetanjali Mishra as Dr. Rohini (Episode 76) / Zeenat Baig (Episode 253) / Neetu (Episode 370) / Neeru Sharma (Episode 484) / Karuna (Episode 525) / Kavita (Episode 943) / Nakshatra Pandey (Episode 1001) / Drishti (Episode 1135) / Jyoti (Episode 1239) / Rajni (Episode 1497) / Lata (1831) / Sandhya (Episode 2318) / Zeenat (Episode 2658)
- Girish Pardesi as Gulabchand (Episode 617)
- Gargi Sharma as Sheetal Khanna (Episode 215) / Amita (Episode 797) / Pinky (Episode 840) / Ankita (Episode 900) / Kaajal (Episode 1841)
- Garima Goel as kavya (Episode 821) / Renuka (Episode 1041)
- Gazal Saini as Reema (Episode 1987) / Pooja (Episode 2379)

=== H ===
- Himanshu Rai as Akhilesh (Episode S65 E45)
- Harsh Khurana as Jaiveer, Circus Owner (Episode 1223) / Doctor Pradhan (Episode 2287)
- Hrishikesh Pandey as Inspector Surendra (Episode 2028)
- Harsh Vashisht as Satyendra Singh (Episode 675) / Dr. Virat Agarwal (Episode 1765)
- Harpreet Chhabra
- Harsh Kumar

=== I ===
- Imran Khan (TV actor) as Ramji (Episode 2209)
- Indira Krishnan as Sulekha Vatsh (Episode 36)

=== J ===
- Jitendra Trehan as Police Inspector Bhosale (Episode 495) / (Episode 1734) / Avinash (Episode 2313)
- Jiten Lalwani as Police Inspector Shivkumar (Episode 2039)
- Jiya Shankar as Roshni
- Jyoti Gauba as Amrita (Episode 987) / Saroja (Episode 1141) / Saroj (Episode 1516)/ Mala (Episode 1617) Archana (Episode 1787)
- Jatin Bhatia as Raj (Episode 370)
- Jasveer Kaur as Janvi (Episode 837)

=== K ===
- Kapil Arya (Episode 2341)
- Ketaki Dave Rajni (Episode 1900)
- Karan Grover as Jeevan (Episode 632)
- Khyaati Khandke Keswani as Kavita (Episode 1174)
- Khushboo Kamal
- Kinshuk Mahajan as Ashok (Episode 1138) / Uday (Episode 1775)
- Kishore Mahabole as Kedarbhai (Episode 1406)
- Kishwer Merchant as Sharmila (Episode 528) / Roshni (Episode 580)
- Kanan Malhotra as Dr.Rahul (Episode 1308) / Arjun (Episode 2147)
- Khalid Siddiqui as Vinay (Episode 779)
- Kamlesh Oza as Nathuram (Episode 2403)
- Kunal Bakshi as Dr. Karan (Episode 821) / Karan (Episode 1397)
- Kunal Jaisingh as Arjun
- Khushboo Atre as Mamta (Episode 348) / Sakshi (Episode 481) / Bina (Episode 633)
- Kiran Khoje as Reshma (Episode 2541)
- Kanishka Soni as Maya (Episode 1346) / Sweety (Episode 1843)
- Khushi Khan as Nikita (Episode 841) / Chiriya (Episode 2344)
- Khushboo Tawde as Asha, Train Passenger (Episode 2038) / Sarika (Episode 2181)

=== L ===
- Lankesh Bhardwaj as Inspector

=== M ===
- Mahhi Vij as Dr. Anju (Episode 40) / Reha (Episodes 1–5)
- Mehul Buch as Doctor Vipul Seth (Episode No 1290) / Haribhai, Housing Society Secretary (Episode 2174)
- Maadhav Deochake as Doctor Shiv (Episode 259)
- Madhuri Dikshit as Dai Maa (Episode 514)
- Mamik Singh as Naveen Neelam (Episode 611) / Udaybhan Singh, Kakasaheb (Episode 664)
- Maninder Singh as Inspector (Episode 458)
- Mala Salariya as RJ Rohini (Episode 1269) / Reshma (Episode 2230)
- Manav Gohil as Danny (Episode 350)
- Manish Goel as Mohan Awasthi, Serial Killer (Episode 2006)
- Megha Gupta as Seema (Episode 610) / Neelam Gaurav Rajput (Episode 635) / Episode 777 / Devika (Episode 883) / Simran (Episode 1168)
- Manish Khanna as Corrupt Police Inspector Mahesh Kamdaar (Episode 1361)
- Meghan Jadhav Sanish Shirke (Episode 120) / Sanjay (Episode 352) / Amit Srivastav (Episode 496) / Sunny Khurana (Episode 636)
- Muni Jhah as Narayan Bhai (Episode 2118)
- Mihir Mishra as Saahil (Episode 768)
- Manini Mishra as Radhika (Episode 768), Prabha, Bengali Mother-in-Law (Episode 1847)
- Muskaan Mihani as Sunanda, Housewife (Episode 702)
- Meet Mukhi as (Episode 747) / Rahul (Episode 1278) / Suraj Ranjit Singh (Episode 2373) / Rishabh (Episode 2249)
- Mihir Rajda as Bhavesh (Episode 1372)
- Mukesh Rawal as Sharma, wheel chair Handicapped patient (Episode 774)
- Mrinalini Tyagi as Sulochana (Episode 1193) / Smriti (Episode 1956)
- Mridul Das as Manu (Episode 2325) / Sampat (Episode 2656)
- Muskan Bamne as Soni (Episode 1490)
- Mansi Nirmal Jain as Sheena (Episode 1690)
- Muskaan Uppal as Komal (Episode 1076)
- Monica Khanna as Sunanda (Episode 1118)
- Mukesh Solanki as Vineet (Episode 1216)

=== N ===
- Neil Bhatt as Arjun
- Neha Bam as Dadima (Episode 649) / Uma (Episode 1443) / Mrs.Singh (Episode 1567) / (Episode 2029)
- Nikhil Arya as Vinod (Episode 2287)
- Neena Cheema as Pushpa (Episode 360) / Rukminidevi (Episode 496) / Mrs. Deshpande (Episode 783) / Mrs. Bhatia (Episode 890) / Nimrat Kaur Singh (Episode 1035)
- Nasir Khan as Santram Chaudhary (Episode 1933)
- Nidhi Jha as Dimple (Episode 293) / Sona Bhushan (Episode 450) / Divya (Episode 580) / Niyati Patel (Episode 739) / Anokhi Chaudhari, Psycho Killer patient (Episode 843) / Sunita (Episode 892) / Riya Gupta (Episode 1134) / Ayesha (Episode 1244),
- Niyati Joshi as Priya (Episode 516) / Parmeet (Episode 639) / Mehak (Episode 1244) / Dipika (Episode 1311) / Esha (Episode 1451) / Mahika (Episode 1528) / Neeru (Episode 1664) / Ritu (Episode 2190)
- Navni Parihar as Rajashree (Episode 645)
- Neelima Parandekar as Suman (Episode No 829)
- Nandini Singh as Sonali Kulkarni (Episode 135) / Shanaya (Episode 651) / Kiran (Episode 751)/ Parminder, Pammi (Episode 877) / Rupa (Episode 996) / Vaishali (Episode 1290) / Vijaya, Bank Manager (Episode 1390) / CBI officer (Episode 2320) / Saloni (Episode 2541)
- Narayani Shastri as Saroja Arvind Khattar (Episode 962)
- Nausheen Ali Sardar as Chandni (Episode 673)
- Neetha Shetty as Sheetal (Episode 220) / Veena Ghanshyam Chaurasia (Episode 358) / Bharti (Episode 467) / Rati (Episode 601) / Advocate Ketki Diwan / Madhu (Episode 664) / Rashi Pawar (Episode 692) / Sanjana (Episode 729) / Kkusum (Episode 851) / Jyoti Pandey (Episode 979) / Nirali (Episode 1271) / Devi, Bengali Housewife (Episode 2130)
- Naresh Suri as Anant Desai (Episode 961) / Sudhir Rao (Episode 1278) / Prakashchand Rawat (Episode 2387)
- Nabeel Ahmed as Rahul and Niketan
- Namrata Thapa as Maya Sameer Malhotra (Episode 704) / Neeta Verma (Episode 1132) / Mausami (Episode 1316)
- Neetu Pandey as Karuna (Episode 674) / Sapna (Episode 2404)
- Nishant Singh as Rohan (Episode 2351)

=== O ===
- Ojaswi Oberoi as Megha (Episode 1564) / Komal (Episode 1648) / Tanisha (Episode 46)

=== P ===
- Pankaj Berry as Police Inspector Yashwant Chauhan (Episode 532)
- Parul Chauhan as Roopa (Episode 47)
- Preetika Chauhan as Pallavi (Episode 42) / Madhuri (Episode 178) /Riya (Episode 1207) / Rajni (Episode 1443) / Manali (Episode 1619) / Anjali Rawat (Episode 2084) / Kalpana Fake Doctor(Episode 2394)
- Poonam Chandorkar as Police Inspector Aditi Sharma (Episode No 2060)
- Prince Sharma as cleaver Driver (episode 64)
- Pankaj Dheer as Gurubaksh (Episode No 732)
- Preeti Gandwani as Shweta (Episode 1308) / Kiran's sister-in-law (Episode 1506) / Sheetal (Episode 1623) / Amod's wife (Episode 1908)
- Priyal Gor as Priyanka, Press Reporter(Episode 434)
- Priya Marathe as Sapna / Reshma (Episodes 21–25)
- Payal Nair as Lisa (Episode 1210)
- Papiya Sengupta as Maya, Beauty parlour Owner (Episode 152), Advocate Lata Verma (Episode 229)
- Pradeep Shukla (Episode 1941)
- Prinal Oberoi as Mrs. Ajay Singh (Episode 1476) / Meena (Episode 2101) / (Episode 2165)
- Pooja Pihal as Dhwani (Episode 1219) / Ragini (Episode 1515) / Garima Akash Sharma (Episode 1576) / Kirti (Episode 1675) / Sangeeta (Episode 2192)
- Pubali Sanyal as Vasundhara, Widow of Martyred Indian Army Soldier (Episode 340)
- Prachi Thakker as Rukmani (Episode 1472) / Jignesh's wife (Episode 2272)
- Puneet Vashisht as Bittu (Episode 584) / Jatin Saxena, Politician (Episode 1104) / Amay (Episode 1773) / Vikas (Episode 2303)
- Pankaj Vishnu as Rakesh Shinde (Episode 511) / Anand (Episode 733) / Manik Bhai (Episode 921)
- Prithvi Zutshi as Charandas (Episode 356) / Narendra Shergill (Episode 785) / Prakash Trivedi (Episode 798) / Kamlesh (Episode 2405)
- Priya Shinde as Alka (Episode 925) / Shaila (Episode 1216) / Vaishali (Episode 1426) / Aditi (Episode 1558) / Meena (Episode 1590)
- Piyush Suhane as Ajay (Episode 165) / Yograj (Episode 223) / Suryavansh (Episode 673) / Bhuvan Singh (Episode 2403)
- Puneet Channa as Jagan (Episode 80) / Sunil (Episode 511) / Chirag (Episode 806) / Gaurav (Episode 872) / Harish (Episode 1612) / Vikram (Episode 2271) / Avinash (Episode 2383)

Pushkar Priyadarshi as Harsh (season 8 episode 17)

- Piyali Munshi as Smriti (Episode 1067) / Meena (Episode 1386) / Komal (Episode 2208)
- Prachi Vaishnav as Priya

(Season 9 episode 5)

- Poorti Arya

=== R ===
- Rohit Tailor various episodes in various roles
- Raayo S. Bakhirta as Arjun, Cricket Captain (Episode 1314)
- Rohit Bakshi as Police Inspector Vinay Barua (Episode 460)
- Ranveer Chahal as Lalu (Episode 15 SP19)
- Rasik Dave as Doctor Naik (Episode 1298)
- Ravi Gossain as Trilokchand (Episode 1819) / Amrish (Episode 2235) / Sangraam (Episode 2403)
- Rucha Gujarathi as Jayshree Shah (Episode 279)
- Ravi Jhankal as Shinde (Episode 959) / Krishnakant (Episode 1161) / Shakuntala, Transgender (Episode 1408) / Praveen (Episode 2176) / (Episode 2367)
- Raju Kher as Shyamlal Doshi (Episode 2242)
- Resha Konkar as Alka (Episode 191) / Riya Patil (Episode 251) / Chetna (Episode 835) / Ratna (Episode 972)
- Rajeev Kumar as Pramod Dhillon (Episode 462) / Dr Ramesh Kulkarni (Episode 2235)
- Raj Premi as Omprakash (Episode 565)
- Rajesh Puri as Mr.D'Souza (Episode 2070)
- Rajeev Paul as Sanjay (Episode 1581)
- Rupa Divetia as Jaya (Episode 1431)
- Rushad Rana as Rakesh Mishra (Episode 693) / Chetan (Episode 1041) / Rahul (Episode 1540) / Deepak (Episode 1715)
- Rishabh Shukla as Kishore (Episode 279)
- Rio Kapadia as Rajat Sinha (Episode 1574)
- Raj Singh Suryavanshi as Ramesh (Episode 347) / Zuber (Episode 472) / Gautam (Episode 929) / Angad Mehta (Episode 1001) / Sumit (Episode 1164) / Arjun Chhotey (Episode 1632) / Kuldeep Chaurasia (Episode 2359)
- Raj Singh Verma as Chetan (Episode 347) / Rajat Chaudhary (Episode No 2278)
- Rishi Khurana as Vikas (Episode 731)
- Rishi Saxena as Police Inspector Vikram (Episode 1177)
- Rose Khan as Tina (Episode 2145)
- Rakesh Kukreti as Jitesh (Episode 1445) / Chandrasekhar (Episode 2106) / Vikas (Episode 2304)
- Raquel Rebello as Arpita (Episode 408)/ Shruti (Episode 792) / Meenal (Episode 1076) / Arpita (Episode 1460) / Sapna (Episode 1744)
- Ritu Chauhan as Chitra (Episode 743) / Shraddha (Episode 1923)
- Richa Soni as Neha (Episode 1278) / Neelam (Episode 507)

=== S ===
- Shamik Abbas as Aniket (Episode 2249) / Babloo (Episode 2293)
- Sarwar Ahuja as (Episode 80)
- Salil Ankola as Kunal Singh (Episode 267)
- Shakti Anand as Bharat Gupta (Episode 936) / Surajpratap Singh (Episode 2158)
- Shubhangi Atre as Seema (Episode 779)
- Sulabha Arya as Sampada, Dadi Grandmother (Episode 946)
- Shruti Bapna as Nirmala (Episode 195)
- Sheena Bajaj as Ruchi (Episode 784)
- Sanjay Batra as Ajay (Episode 909)
- Shreya Bugade as Anjali Kumar, Dumb Girl (Episode 295)
- Swati Bajpai as Ritika (Episode 626) / Ria (Episode 896) / Shobha, Pregnant Housewife (Episode 1460) / Madhu (Episode 1115) / (2392)
- Sai Deodhar as Sunaina Surajpratap Singh (Episode 2158)
- Sumana Das as Pratima (Episode 22)
- Sanjay Gagnani as Varun (Episode 702) / Akash (Episode 872) / Dheeraj (Episode 977) / Anmol Shah (Episode 1118) / Chirag (Episode 1244) / Fake Police Inspector Varun Chauhan (Episode 1463) / Sandeep (Episode 1538)
- Sarita Joshi as (Episode 209)
- Sara Khan as Savitri (Episode 766)
- Shahab Khan as Various
- Siraj Mustafa Khan as Raghav Pratap Purohit Pintu Bhaiya, Corrupt Politician (Episode 85) / AD, Circus Bike Stunter (Episode 1223) / Satish Shinde (Episode 1224)
- Smriti Khanna as Ishita (Episode 1806) / Lata (Episode 2102) / Soni (Episode 2161)
- Sachin Khurana as Rajat (Episode 483) / Vivek Sanghavi (Episode 1389)/ Arjun (Episode 1490)
- Shresth Kumar as Ravi (Episode 1162) / Prasad (Episode 1353) / Akshay (Episode 1854) / Rohit (Episode 1951)
- Sunila Karambelkar as Kaushalya (Episode 1246)
- Shubhangi Latkar as Dadima (Episode 2404)
- Sheetal Maulik as Ragini (Episode 1377) / Bhabhi (Episode 1943) / Ruchi (Episode 2275)
- Sangeeta Naik as Juhi Singh, Old mental depressed Lady (Episode 134)
- Shafaq Naaz as Naina Kamat (Episode 80) / Harpreet Sandhu (Episode 257)
- Samragyi Nema as Rati (Episode 829) / Manisha (Episode 960) / Nalini (Episode 1210)
- Sameer Rajda as (Episode 308)
- Sandeep Rajora as Ajay Jaiswal / Shashank Jaiswal (Episode 670) / Teacher (Episode 2308)
- Sheela Sharma as (Episode No 1477) / Pratima (Episode 1881)
- Shishir Sharma as Mahesh (Episode 824) / Prashant Jain (Episode 893)
- Shakti Singh as Subhedar Ratan Singh, Retd Army Officer (Episode 1122) / Mohan Sawant, Retd Police Officer (Episode 1919) / Ravi (Episode 1494)
- Sonia Singh as Aparna (Episode 1982)
- Sudeep Sarangi as Jitendra (Episode 121) / Chetan Pandey (Episode 979) / Mahendra Sharma (Episode 1030) / Gagan (Episode 1165) / Pramod, Courier man, Serial Killer (Episode No 1919) / (Episode 1327) / Diler (Episode 2322)
- Shital Thakkar as Rituu (Episode 486) / Rashmi (Episode 682) / Shweta (Episode 862)
- Sumona Chakravarti as Shruti (Episode 740)
- Sonakshi More as Roshni (Episode 174) / Archana (Episode 385) / Sundari (Episode 1447)
- Sushil Bonthiyal as Sewa Ram (Episode 462) / Sajjan (Episode 584) / Khurram (2524)
- Suman Patel as Gayatri (Episode 1807) / Sakshi (Episode 2170)
- Sarika Dhillon as Rohini (Episode 328) / Sonali (Episode 402) / Meghna (Episode 518) / Neha (Episode 747) / Kinjal (Episode 1073) / Seema (Episode 1571) / Ratna (Episode 1669)
- Sabina Jat as Vibha (Episode 73) / Kanchan (Episode 367) / Sejal (Episode 726) / Gauri (Episode 878) / Jhilmil (Episode 2359) / Ritu (Episode 2403)
- Sneha Jain as Farheen (Episode 2656)
- Shubha Saxena as Ekta (Episode 821)
- Sudeepta Singh as Zubaida (Episode 241)
- Saurabh Goyal as Akash (Episode 2300)
- Saheem Khan as Ajay (Episode 348) / Vicky (Episode 748) / Manohar (Episode 1118) / Pradeep (Episode 2388) / Abhay (Episode 2447)
- Shahnawaz Pradhan as Govind (Episode 1499)
- Sonal Parihar as Rajjo (Episode 462) / Sandhya (Episode 680)
- Shweta Tiwari as Sargam, Film Actress (Episode 744)
- Sheetal Pandya as Simmi (Episode 164)
- Shirin Sewani as Ganga (Episode 2186)
- Saurabh Agarwal as Mukul (Episode 507)
- Sonam arora as naini teacher (S68 E15 Hotstar)

=== T ===
- Tarakesh Chauhan as Jugal Kishore (Episode 585) / Guruji, Politician (Episode 1104) / Kailash Verma (Episode 1132)
- Tiya Gandwani as Professor Divya (Episode 774) / Neela's sister-in-law (Episode 1040) / Sharda (Episode 1336) / Darshana (Episode 1396) / Jyostna (Episode 1468) / Mukta (Episode 1767) / Jaya Hemant Sahni (Episode 54)
- Tarun Khanna as Devraj Singh (Episode 664)
- Tejashri Pradhan as Jamuna (Episode 286)
- Tapasya Srivastava as Kusum (Episode 1355)
- Tanvi Thakkar as Janhavi (Episode 586) / Chhaya (Episode No 892) / Tarana (Episode 1349) / Aarti (Episode 2328)
- Tanu Vidyarthi as Kirti (Episode 1774)

=== U ===
- Usha Bachani as Damini (Episode 1327) / Sumitra (Episode 1894)
- Ulka Gupta as Megha Singh (Episode 267) / Alka, Sports Athlete (Episode 916)
- Ujjwal Rana as Varun (Episode 1278) / Ashwin Rudra (Episode 2039)
- Utkarsha Naik as Hema (Episode 1164) / Sunita (Episode 1618) / (Episode 2392)

=== V ===
- Varun Badola as Inspector Varun (Episode 384)
- Vikram Singh Chauhan as Arun
- Vineet Raina as Daksh (Episode 328) / Avinash (Episode 552) / Rajat (Episode 655) / Dr. Sandeep Rane (Episode 925)
- Vikram Sahu as Dr. Gupta (Episode 1345)
- Vivana Singh as Savita (Episode 1668)
- Vaquar Shaikh as Inspector (Episodes 21–25) / Diwakar (Episode 1476)
- Vineet Sharma as RG, Sports Trainer/Sir (Episode 916)
- Vishal Thakkar as Deven (Episode 1158)
- Vinod Kapoor as Sangraam (Episode 367) / Gulzar (Episode 472) / (Episode 629) / Professor Satish Bhatnagar (Episode 1006) / Village School Master Jaydrath (Episode 1225) / (Episode 2315)
- Vinod Singh as Aniket (Episode 1519)
- Vikas Shrivastav as Avinash Raj Singh
- Vaishnavi Mahant as Meera, Psychotic Mother (Episode 2181)
- Vinita Mahesh as Aayushi Raheja (Episode 2303) / Shweta (Episode 2331)
- Vishal Nayak as Tarun (Episode 1067) / Rahul (Episode 1431)

=== W ===
- Wasim Mushtaq as Jai Sinha (Episode 2280)

=== Y ===
- Yash Pandit as Aaradhya Singh (Episode 134) / Ajay (Episode 829)/ Rajiv (Episode 2106) / Karan (Episode 2293) /Keshav Tomar, Traffic Police Constable (Episode 2330)

=== Z ===
- Zarina Wahab as Nirmala (Episode 519) / Rajjo (Episode 732)
- Zeeshan Ahmed Khan as Imran Pathan (Episode 1786)

== Hosts ==
- Ajay Devgn
- Akshay Kumar
- Amitabh Bachchan
- Amar Upadhyay
- Ankit Bhardwaj
- Ashutosh Rana
- Atul Kulkarni
- Dayanand Shetty
- Divya Dutta
- Gaurav Chopra
- Gurmeet Choudhary
- Hiten Tejwani
- Karmveer Choudhary
- Kavita Kaushik
- Manoj Tiwari
- Mohit Malik
- Mohnish Behl
- Pooja Gaur
- Pratyusha Banerjee
- Ravi Kishan
- Sakshi Tanwar
- Sanjay Suri
- Saurabh Raj Jain
- Shreyas Talpade
- Sidharth Shukla
- Smriti Irani
- Sushant Singh
- Tisca Chopra
- Sachin Pilgaonkar
- John Abraham
- Manoj Bajpayee
- Vidya Balan
- R Madhavan
- Sonakshi Sinha
- Shefali Shah
- Pratyusha Banerjee
- Rajkummar Rao
- Raj Babbar
- Nawazuddin Siddiqui

== See also ==
- Crime Patrol
- India's Most Wanted
- List of programs broadcast by Life OK
- List of programs broadcast by Star Bharat
