= Aham Sharma =

Indian actor

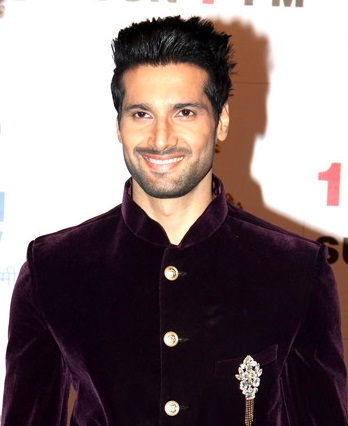
- Sharma in 2017
- Born: 22 July 1989 (age 37); Salimpur (Barh), Bihar, India
- Education: B.E. in Electronics & Electrical Engineering
- Alma mater: Institute of Engineering & Technology, DAVV, Indore
- Occupation: Actor
- Years active: 2008–present
- Known for: Karna in Mahabharat (2013–14); Rishabh Srivastava in Brahmarakshas; Vikramaditya in *Vikram Betaal Ki Rahasya Gatha*
- Awards: Indian Telly Award for Best Actor in a Supporting Role (2014) for Mahabharat

Aham Sharma (born 22 July 1989) is an Indian actor from Salimpur, Bihar, India. Best known for his work in Indian television, he has also featured in several Bollywood films including 1962 My Country Land which premiered at Marche du Film of the 69th Cannes Film Festival.

Sharma's most recognizable TV roles include Karna in Mahabharat (2013–2014), Rishabh Srivastava in Brahmarakshas (2016–2017) and Vikramaditya in Vikram Betaal Ki Rahasya Gatha (2018–2019).

== Career ==
=== Early career (2008–2013) ===
In 2008, Sharma began his acting career in Hindi television. He signed the lead role of Rehaan, a Lucknow young man of aristocratic lineage who was sent to London in childhood by his over protective mother before returning to his hometown Lucknow after growing up, in Gul Khan's production debut Chand Ke Paar Chalo for NDTV Imagine that co-starred Yami Gautam and Zalak Thakker. It failed to gain good ratings, ending just after 80 episodes in February 2009.

In 2009, Sharma made his Hindi cinema debut with the release of his first movie, the suspense crime thriller Blue Oranges.

Sharma achieved three projects in 2010. Firstly he teamed up with producer Ekta Kapoor for the first time in Bairi Piya for Colors TV as Nirbhay Pundir. Next he appeared as Anil and Amit respectively in two different episodes of Fireworks Productions's horror supernatural anthology Aahat on Sony Entertainment Television. In his final work of the year, he did a cameo as the strong Aditya Ahlawat, an aspiring politician in the crime drama Kaali – Ek Agnipariksha on Star Plus produced by Undercover Productions Ltd.

Sharma's first project of 2013 was an episodic part in the scary horror series Fear Files: Darr Ki Sacchi Tasvirein with Neetha Shetty. Consecutively he bagged two episodics in Fireworks Productions's popular police procedural television series CID. In May 2013, he found a villainous role for the first time in his career in Firefly Productions's crime detective supernatural series SuperCops vs Supervillains on Life OK as Scientist Dr. Ajay/Vidyut - The Flash Man, an antagonist with superpowers.

=== Breakthrough via Mahabharat and beyond (2013–present) ===
Sharma had his break through in 2013 with Mahabharat TV series on Star Plus, based on the Hindu epic of the same name, in which he performed as warrior Karna. It co-starred Shaheer Sheikh, Pooja Sharma, Saurabh Raj Jain among others. His acting gained him the Indian Telly Award for Best Supporting Actor award.

In 2014, Sharma essayed Jass in the romantic drama film Karle Pyaar Karle. It was a box office disaster. In early-2015, he was finalised as the main lead for Swastik Productions's new project Dosti... Yaariyan... Manmarziyan, a television show on Star Plus. He portrayed the role of Arjun Mehra, a man with a hidden motif having various shades of constantly striving between good and bad in himself.

Sharma began 2016 in 1962 My Country Land, a period film about the Indo-China War, featuring him as an Army Lance Naik who gets responsibility for mapping along the Indo-China border. In August 2016, he reteamed with Kapoor for the supernatural show Brahmarakshas on Zee TV wherein he enacted the character of Rishabh Srivastava, the main protagonist opposite Krystle D'Souza. Being a finite series, it culminated in February 2017.

== Personal life ==
Sharma shares very little about his personal life. In an interview he revealed that he has been married and has two daughters with his wife.

== Media ==
In 2014, Sharma was rated 26th in the 11th edition of 50 Sexiest Asian Men in The World by the British weekly newspaper Eastern Eye.

== Filmography ==
=== Films ===
Year	Title	Role	Ref(s)
2009	Blue Oranges	Kevin Travasso	
2012	Yeh Jo Mohabbat Hai	Zoravar	
2014	Karle Pyaar Karle	Jass	
2016	1962 My Country Land	Army Lance Naik Luitya	
2022	Dhoop Chhaon	Aman	
2021	The Power	Charlie	
2022	Bagawat	Vikram Singh	
2023	Naseeb mera Dushman	Micky	
2023	Acting Ka Bhoot	Akki	

=== Television ===
Year	Title	Role	Notes	Ref(s)
2008–2009	Chand Ke Paar Chalo	Rehan		
2009	Saat Phere: Saloni Ka Safar	Aditya Brijesh Singh		
2010	Bairi Piya	Nirbhay Pundir		
2010	Aahat	Anil		
2010	Aahat	Amit		
2010	Kaali – Ek Agnipariksha	Aditya Ahlawat		
2011	Ek Nayi Chhoti Si Zindagi	Shravan		
2012	Aasman Se Aage	Angad		
2013	Fear Files	Kushal	Season 1	
2013	CID	Rai		
2013	CID	Mahesh		
2013	Hum Ne Li Hai Shapath	Dr. Ajay / Vidyut: The Flash Man		
2013–2014	Mahabharat	Karna		
2015	Dosti... Yaariyan... Manmarziyan	Arjun Mehra		
2016	Bharatvarsh	Ashoka		
2016–2017	Brahmarakshas	Rishabh Shrivastava/Narasimha		
2018–2019	Vikram Betaal Ki Rahasya Gatha	King Vikramaditya		
2025	Sampoorna	Dr. Aakash Sukhdev Malhotra		

=== Web series ===
Year	Title	Role	Notes	Ref(s)
2021	Crime Next Door	Dushyant		
2024	Chitta Ve	Taran		

== Awards ==
Year	Award	Category	Work	Result
2014	Indian Telly Awards	Best Actor in a Supporting Role	Mahabharat	Won

== See also ==
- List of Indian television actors
