= Rishta.com =

2010 Indian television series

- Starring: See below
- Country of origin: India
- Original language: Hindi
- No. of seasons: 1
- No. of episodes: 26

Production
- Camera setup: Multi-camera
- Running time: 52 minutes
- Production company: YRF Television

Original release
- Network: Sony Entertainment Television
- Release: 3 January – 30 June 2010

Rishta.com (transl. Relation.com) is an Indian television series which broadcast on Sony TV on 3 January 2010. The show is produced by Aditya Chopra under YRF Television. The show was conceived, written and directed by Rishab Seth.

== Premise ==
Rishta.com follows business partners, Isha Mirchandani and Rohan Mehra who run a matrimonial agency together. The two are polar opposites and have been frenemies since college. While Rohan is the typical Casanova, aloof, detached and sarcastic, Isha leans towards the more emotional, dedicated and systematic end of the spectrum. Huzaifa Ali, is the CEO of Rishta.com and is perpetually emerging with schemes to cut down costs, much to the chagrin of other employees. The second supporting character, Ruchika is the flamboyant, flirty and fashionable marketing and PR head. Other recurring characters include Isha's laid-back father who shares a close relationship with her. His girlfriend, Naina is 20 years his junior and is also a recurring character.

== Cast ==
=== Main ===
- Shruti Seth as Isha Mirchandani
- Kavi Shastri as Rohan Mehra
- Kavin Dave as Huzaifa Ali
- Kiren Jogi as Ruchika

=== Recurring ===
- Siddhant Karnick as Gaurav Kapoor
- Aishwarya Sakhuja as Sukhrit Singh
- Seema Azmi as Sally
- Hasan Zaidi as Ashish
- Viraf Patel as Arjun Khanna
- Shiv Panditt as Neeraj
- Kuki Grewal as Ramika Rathore
- Gaurav Karan Chaudhary as Akshat, Rohan's childhood friend
- Jugal Hansraj as Akshay Dwiwedi
- Farida Jalal as Ruchika's Mother
- Suchitra Pillai as Juhi Anand
- Ridhi Dogra as Sureena
- Mohit Chauhan as Capt. Akshay
- Rushad Rana as Monish
- Vijay Varma as Rohit Gupta
- Avinash Tiwary as Atul
- Sunny Hinduja as Hemant Khosla
- Dipannita Sharma as Mona Wazir
- Uday Chandra as Farooq
