= Chand Ke Paar Chalo =

Chand Ke Paar Chalo may refer to:

- Chand Ke Paar Chalo (film), a 2006 Indian Bollywood film directed by Mustafa Engineer
- Chand Ke Paar Chalo (TV series), a daily soap that airs on NDTV Imagine
