= 1962 My Country Land =

Indian English language film

- Directed by: Chow Partha Borgohain
- Written by: Chow Partha Borgohain
- Story by: Nang Tanvi Manpoong, Chow Partha Borgohain
- Produced by: Marbom Mai
- Starring: Daniel Han
- Cinematography: Chow Partha Borgohain
- Edited by: Amardeep Singh Khichi
- Music by: Rahul Prabhakaran
- Release date: 18 May 2016 (France)
- Running time: 109 minutes
- Country: India
- Language: English

1962 My Country Land is an Indian English-language film directed and written by filmmaker Chow Partha Borgohain in 2016 and produced by Living Dreams Films Productions. The film is about the border dispute, how two nations consider reconciliation based on the 1962 Sino-Indian War.

== Plot ==
At the Himalayan frontiers between India and Tibet, three people engage in combat over a plot of land that is neither in China nor India. Their lives are permanently altered by the 1962 outbreak of the Indo-Sino War. Love blossoms between two, but fate separates them. The other makes a sacrifice for the two by turning against his country.

== Cast ==
- Daniel Shin Han as Wong
- Aham Sharma as Army Lance Naik Luitya
- Lhakpa Lepcha
- Ketholeno Kense

== Production ==
1962 My Country Land is an Indian film production. It has been made by Living Dreams Productions in Arunachal Pradesh, India.

== Awards ==
Year	Award	Category	Result	Ref
2016	Marche du Film	Cannes Film Festival 'OLYMPIA 07'	Nominated	
2022	Brahmaputra Valley Film Festival	Official Selection	Unknown	

== Reception ==
- Jyoti Prasad Rajkhowa: The depiction of the 1962 Indo-China War and rural life in the extraordinarily harsh terrain of Arunachal Pradesh would heighten the already strong sense of patriotism among the locals and also highlight the ongoing difficulty of resolving border disputes.
