= Megha Gupta =

Indian television actress and model

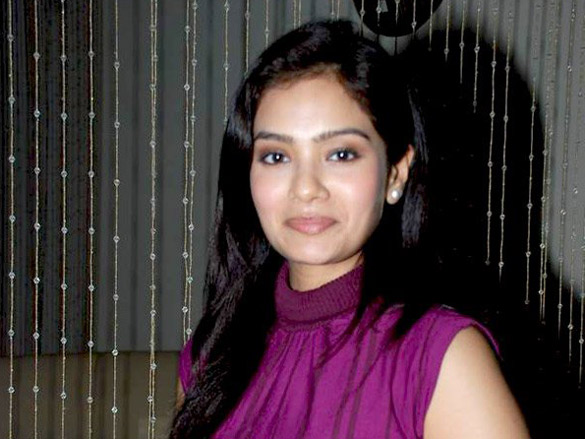
- Gupta in 2012
- Born: Lucknow, Uttar Pradesh, India
- Occupation: actress
- Years active: 2004–2018
- Spouses: Aditya Shroff (m. 2010; div. 2014); Siddhant Karnick (m. 2016; div. 2020)
- Relatives: Amrapali Gupta (sister); Additi Gupta (sister)

Megha Gupta is an Indian television actress and model.

== Career ==
Gupta has appeared in television serials such as Kkavyanjali, Kumkum – Ek Pyara Sa Bandhan, Mamta, C.I.D., MTV Big F, and Main Teri Parchhain Hoon. She entered Nach Baliye 4 with Naman Shaw and was a runner-up. Gupta has also appeared in Yeh Hai Aashiqui and Pyaar Tune Kya Kiya in August 2014.

== Personal life ==
Gupta's sister Additi Gupta is also a television actress.

Gupta was married to Aditya Shroff, owner of Fame Cinemas. In August 2016, she married Ek Tha Raja Ek Thi Rani actor Siddhant Karnick.

== Television ==
Year	Serial	Role	Notes
2004	Kkusum	N/A	Supporting role
2005	Kkavyanjali	Disha Jay Nanda	Supporting role
2006–2007	Kumkum – Ek Pyara Sa Bandhan	Neeti Damani	Supporting role
2006–2007	Mamta	Satya Akshay Srivastav	
2007	Ssshhhh...Phir Koi Hai - Hostel	Riya (Episode 11)	Episodic role
2007	Ssshhhh...Phir Koi Hai - Bhediya	Mahalakshmi (Episode 14)	Episodic role
2007	Ssshhhh...Phir Koi Hai - Khoon Bhari Aankh	Anaida Sanjay Saxena (Episode 31)	Episodic role
2007; 2008	C.I.D.	Inspector Devyana	Supporting role
2008–2009	Main Teri Parchhain Hoon	Aanchal Sidharth Tyagi	Lead role
2008–2009	Nach Baliye 4	Contestant	Reality show
2009	Ssshhhh...Phir Koi Hai - Danav Dasi : Part 1 & Part 2	Devaki (Episode 182 & Episode 183)	Episodic role
2009	Perfect Bride	Host	Reality show
2009	Ladies Special	Dr. Mridula	Cameo role
2010	Aahat - Qatilana Daftar: Part 1 & Part 2	Episode 29 & Episode 30	Episodic role
2010	Maat Pitaah Ke Charnon Mein Swarg	Suhani	Lead role
2010	Geet - Hui Sabse Parayi	Geet's Friend (Episode 1)	Episodic role
2010	Aahat - Maut Ka Khel : Part 13 - Part 16	Megha Gupta (Episode 61 - Episode 64)	Episodic role
2011	Yahaaan Main Ghar Ghar Kheli	Dr. Arundhati	Supporting role
2012	Fear Files: Darr Ki Sacchi Tasvirein	Sukanya (Episode 36)	Episodic role
2013	Fear Files: Darr Ki Sacchi Tasvirein	Advocate Ayesha (Episode 122)	Episodic role
2013	Yeh Hai Aashiqui	Chandni (Season 1 - Episode 18)	Episodic role
2013–2014	Khauff Begins... Ringa Ringa Roses	Aliya	Lead role
2014	Savdhaan India	Seema (Episode 610)	Episodic role
2014	Savdhaan India	Neelam Gaurav Rajput (Episode 635)	Episodic role
2014	Encounter	Dr. Preeti (Episode 4 - Episode 6)	Episodic role
2014	Savdhaan India	Episode 777	Episodic role
2014	Savdhaan India	Devika (Episode 883)	Episodic role
2014	Adaalat - Royal Murder: Part 1	Advocate Rai (Episode 345)	Episodic role
2014	Pyaar Tune Kya Kiya	Professor Riddhima Sahni (Season 1 - Episode 13)	Episodic role
2014	Khushiyon Kii Gullak Aashi	Jigyasa Ravindra Tyagi	
2015	Aahat - Sunshine Villa : Part 1 & Part 2	Kamya (Episode 41 & Episode 42)	Episodic role
2015	Savdhaan India	Simran (Episode 1168)	Episodic role
2015	Code Red	Bindiya (Episode 115)	Episodic role
2015	MTV Big F	Raima Roy (Season 1 - Episode 2)	Episodic role
2016	Dream Girl	Aarti Roy / Aarti Raghav Rastogi	Lead role
2017	Koi Laut Ke Aaya Hai	Ragini Singh Rathore / Ragini Rishabh Singh Shekhari	Cameo
2017	Ayushman Bhava	Samaira	
2018	Piyaa Albela	Guest Dancer	For special dance performance
2018	Bribe	Prostitute	Ullu original web series

=== Films ===
Year	Film	Role
2016	Fan	Payal
