= Pungi Daasa =

- Directed by: M. S. Sreenath
- Screenplay by: M. S. Srinath
- Story by: M. S. Sreenath
- Produced by: S. B. Bhagyamma Sadashiva; D. Sadashiva
- Starring: Komal Kumar; Asma
- Cinematography: K. Arul
- Edited by: Suresh D. H.
- Music by: Farhan Roshan
- Production company: SSV Productions
- Release date: 30 May 2014
- Running time: 153 minutes
- Country: India
- Language: Kannada

Pungi Daasa is a 2014 Indian Kannada comedy drama directed by M. S. Sreenath and starring Komal Kumar and Asma. It is a comedy about how the Pungi Daasa tries to recover the money his grandfather had lent to various people after his grandfather goes into a coma.

== Cast ==
- Komal Kumar as Ramadasa
- Asma as Nandini
- Sowcar Janaki as Gayatri Devi
- B. C. Patil as elder son of Devadasa's first wife
- R. N. Sudarshan as Devadasa
- Tabla Nani as Ramadasa's uncle
- Rajendra Karanth as Kalidasa
- Padmaja Rao as Kalidasa's mother
- Asif as younger son of Devadasa's first wife
- Bullet Prakash
- Kuri Prathap as Ramadasa's friend
- Honnavalli Krishna
- Chikkanna as Ramadasa's friend
- M. S. Umesh
- Rockline Sudhakar
- Mukhyamantri Chandru as judge and Kalidasa's close friend
- H. G. Dattatreya as Devadasa's close friend
- Akki Channabasappa

== Reception ==
A critic from The New Indian Express wrote that "Komal has failed to exercise his witty side in Pungi Daasa and has ended up making an unappealing family drama". A critic from Bangalore Mirror wrote that "Fans of Komal should not mind going to the theatres to watch it. For others, there is TV.
