= Kavi Shastri =

British actor

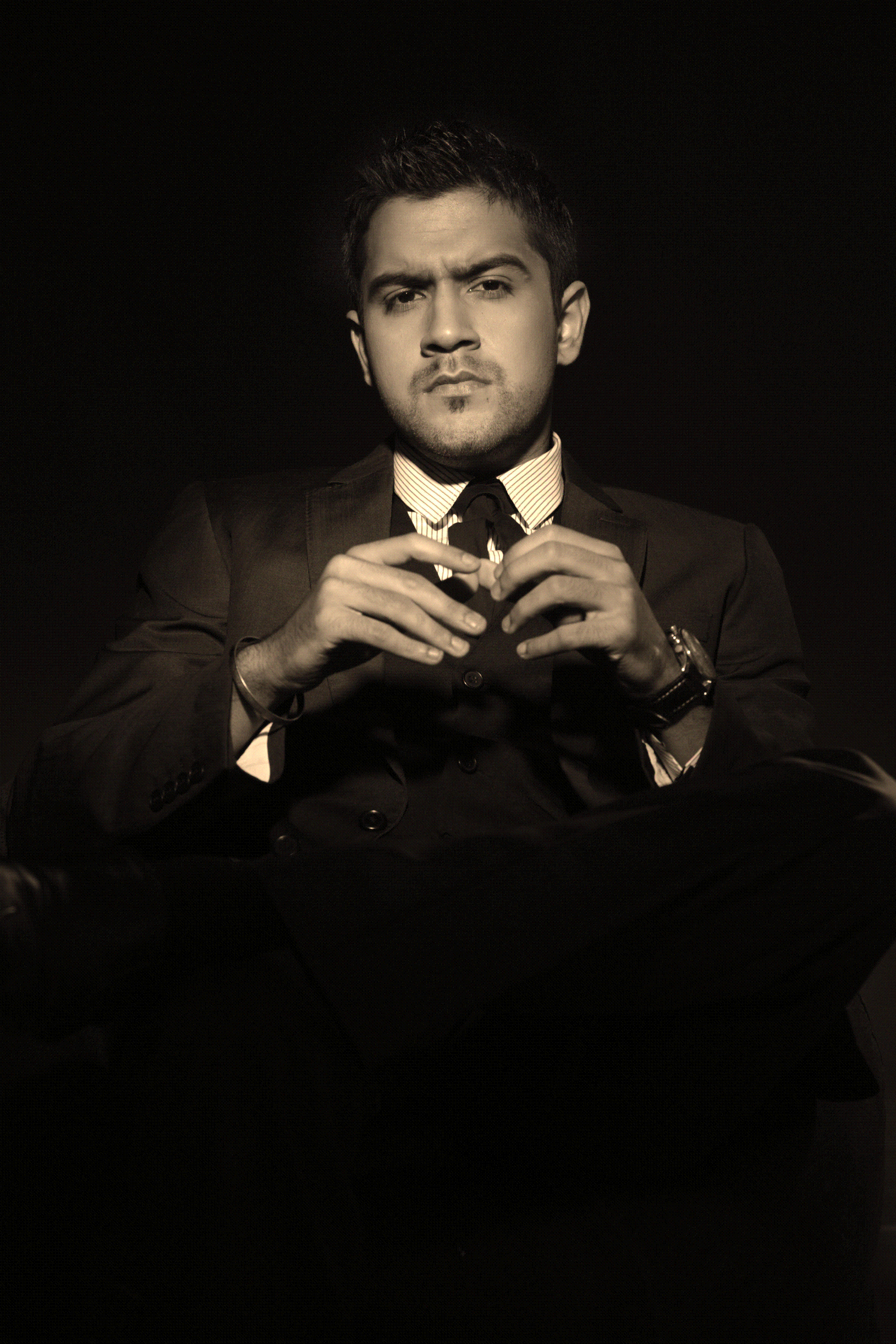
- Born: 19 February 1986 (age 40); London, England
- Occupation: Actor
- Years active: 1997 – present
- Spouse: Sherryl Wiltshire (m. 2012)

Kavi Shastri (born 19 February 1986) is a British film and television actor.

== Early life and education ==
Kavi Shastri was born into a Gujarati family in London, England. His family, including parents Kaushik, Geeta and his older brother Ravi, later moved to South Woodford, London. Shastri attended George Tomlinson Primary school in Leytonstone, East London, and studied at local dance and drama clubs. At the age of nine, he was enrolled into The Padmini Kolhapure School of Acting in London, and throughout his primary years performed at venues across London.

In 1997, Shastri started his studies at the Italia Conti Academy of Theatre Arts. As well as academic studies, he trained in Ballet, Tap Dancing, Jazz, Lyrical, Hip Hop, Musical Theatre and Drama. Whilst at school, Shastri had small roles in ITV's This Morning and BBC One's Holby City. Kavi graduated into the academy's College on a government scholarship in 2003. While attending college, he acted in three seasons of CBBC's hit drama show UGetMe and the British feature Film It Could Be You. As part of his work on the film, Shastri flew to India. Shastri graduated with a Bachelor of Arts in Performing Arts, and was presented with an award from the academy for his achievement in Drama.

== Personal life ==
Shastri married Australian Indian Sherryl Wiltshire in January 2012 in Mumbai, and they currently live in Mumbai, India.

== Career ==
After leaving College, Shastri appeared on ITV's The Bill, and in British feature film Popcorn. In 2009 he moved to India and enrolled in Anupam Kher's Actor Prepares. After graduation, he acted in Imtiaz Ali's Hindi film Love Aaj Kal, where he met Vir Das. The pair returned to Mumbai to create India's first comedy company Weirdass Comedy, which presented stand-up comedy shows and performance across India and worldwide, and wrote scripts for the Filmfare Awards, Zee Cine Awards and Stardust Awards.

In 2008, Shastri played the part of Rohan Mehra on the Indian television show YRF Television's Rishta.com which debuted on 3 January 2010 on Sony Entertainment Television. After four nominations at award shows, Shastri was named the best newcomer at the 10th Indian Telly Awards. Shastri then took on a role with YRF Television's Kismat, an adaptation of Kane and Able.

Shastri and Das performed together at Sophia Auditorium in late 2011, in the stand-up comedy show Ashvin Gidwani's History of India.

Shastri shot his first two films Amit Sahni Ki List and Main aur Mr Riight back to back. Later, he took on a role in the 2013 Yash Raj Films' Aurangzeb.

In 2014, Shastri returned to London to shoot for Ameet Chana's directorial feature debut Jayden.

== Filmography ==
=== Television ===
Year(s)	Title	Role	Language
2001	Holby City	Asaf	English
2003	UGetMe	Ash	English
2005	The Bill	Sadiq Kalia	English
2008	Fairy Tales	Sid	English
2010	Rishta.com	Rohan Mehra	Hindi
2010	Kismat	Vikramaditya Merchant	Hindi
2014	Love by Chance	Himself	Hindi

=== Films ===
Year(s)	Title	Role	Language	Notes
2005	It Could Be You	Sid	English	
2007	Popcorn	Carl	English	
2009	Love Aaj Kal	Jaat	Hindi	
2011	Mujhse Fraaandship Karoge	Pre	Hindi	
2013	Aurangzeb	Inder	Hindi	
2013	Main Aur Mr. Riight	Shaunit	Hindi	
2014	Amit Sahni Ki List	Pushkar	Hindi	
2014	Happy New Year	Mr. Gupta	Hindi	
2015	Brothers	Commentator	Hindi	
2016	Neerja	Naresh Mishra	Hindi	
2016	Wrong Side Raju	Tanmay Shah	Gujarati	
2017	Jab Harry Met Sejal	Rupen	Hindi	
2019	Judgementall Hai Kya		Hindi	
2026	Happy Patel: Khatarnak Jasoos	—N/a	Hindi	Co-directed with Vir Das
