= Aasman Se Aage =

2012 Indian TV series

- The Reality behind Reality Shows.
- Written by: Sumit Roy, Preeti Mamgain and Vikas Chandra
- Directed by: Glen Barretto, Ankush Mohla Arif Shamsi Arif Ali Ansari
- Starring: Ojaswi Oberoi; Apurva Agnihotri; Siddhant Karnick; Aham Sharma; Monica Khanna; Pooja Singh; Mauli Ganguly
- Country of origin: India
- Original language: Hindi
- No. of episodes: 63

Production
- Cinematography: Deepak Malwankar & Sanjay Malwankar
- Running time: Approx. 24 minutes
- Production companies: Sagar Arts & 72 Degree Northe

Original release
- Network: Life OK
- Release: 23 April – 13 July 2012

Aasman Se Aage (English: Beyond the Sky) is an Indian Hindi language television drama that first aired on Life OK. It premiered on 23 April 2012 and was telecast from Monday to Friday evenings through 13 July 2012.

The show tells the story of Meenakshi, a talented but poor slum girl who gets the opportunity of a lifetime to be on a dance reality show on television called Aasman Se Aage (Beyond The Skies).

The show was both a drama about dancing as well as a critical examination of reality shows, laying bare behind-the-scene exploitation and manipulations of the medium. It was promoted with the tagline 'the reality behind reality shows."

== Plot summary ==
Dancer Meenakshi hails from a poor slum in Mumbai. She gets the chance to take part in a TV Dance Reality Show Aasman Se Aage when the producer of the show, DC, sees in her an opportunity get higher TRPs (TV Ratings) by exploiting her poverty.

Initially her mother, Malti, is opposed to the idea but gives in to Meenakshi's pleas. From here the show starts following the journey of Meenakshi and some other participants - Karishma (a cut-throat competitor who is ready to do anything to win), the brothers Angad (who is good-natured and extremely supportive of his brother) and Akshat (who always needs to win at any cost, but suffers from performance anxiety), and Sameer (a young desperate school kid whose parents want him to become a doctor rather than a dancer).

Meenakshi gets through the auditions and is invited to live in the ASA Academy, wired with cameras. As soon as Meenakshi enters the academy, DC cleverly leaks a video which suggests that he has a sexual relationship with her. This makes the other participants resent Meenakshi. Karishma leads a hazing campaign against Meenakshi where she is mercilessly taunted for being a naukrani's (maid's) daughter.

Meenakshi's choreographer, Alan, inspires her to give her best and dance for the sake of expressing herself and not for the contest. However, when Karishma connives with Akshat to steal a song on which Meenakshi is supposed to perform, Meenakshi breaks down and runs back home.

DC manipulates Alan, making him believe Meenakshi likes him romantically, and sends him to convince her to return. Meenakshi agrees and returns with renewed strength.

Soon after, DC announces the final shortlist of 12 candidates. Sameer, Meenakshi's closest confidante, is thrown out of the show. Wanting a love story on the show, DC throws the constantly fighting duo of Akshat and Meenakshi together. Sameer is turned away from his house by his father and feels dejected. He is mugged and tries to commit suicide but is saved by Akshat and Meenakshi. This leads to Akshat and Meenakshi becoming friends. On the final day, they perform together but lose.

== Cast ==
- Ojaswi Oberoi as Meenakshi Kumar
- Apurva Agnihotri as Dev Chopra / DC, producer of the show
- Siddhant Karnick as Akshat, a contestant on the show who is later partnered with Meenakshi
- Aham Sharma as Angad, Akshat's brother, a contestant on the show
- Monica Khanna as Karishma, a competitive contestant on the show
- Kushal Punjabi as Alan, Meenakshi's supportive choreographer on the show
- Mauli Ganguly as Roshni
- Rajesh Khera as Sanam
- Manini De as Mahua
- Malini Sengupta as Malti, Meenakshi's mother
- Pooja Singh as Poonam, Meenakshi's sister
- Sheela Sharma as Vinita
- Mansi Sharma as Sandhya
- Pulkit Sandhu as Bobby
- Vrushika Mehta as Vrushika
- Akash Shetty as Akash

== Reception and Cancellation ==
On 11 June 2012, it was confirmed that Life OK was going to change the program line-up, and on doing this they decided to end Aasman Se Aage due to it getting low ratings. The decision led to protests from fans of the show and the channel was criticized for cancelling the show within 2 months of its airing, leading to speculation that the decision may have been politically motivated.
