= Mere Sai – Shraddha Aur Saburi =

2017 Indian television series based on Sai Baba of Shirdi

- Also known as: Mere Sai
- Genre: Historical drama
- Created by: Aparna Padgaonkar
- Written by: Aparna Padgaonkar, Roshni Suvrna, Nitin Keswani
- Screenplay by: Koel Chaudhuri
- Story by: Nitin Keswani, Roshni Suvrna
- Directed by: Sachin Ambre; Harsh B Agrawal
- Creative directors: Siddhav Nachane; Hridaya Nath Jha
- Starring: See below
- Theme music composer: Devendra Bhome
- Opening theme: "Om Sai Om...Sai Om..."
- Composer: Devendra Bhome
- Country of origin: India
- Original language: Hindi
- No. of seasons: 1
- No. of episodes: 1432

Production
- Executive producer: Rajan Singh
- Producers: Nitin Vaidya; Ninad Vaidya; Aparna Padgaonkar
- Cinematography: Santosh Tripathi
- Editor: Amey Godkar
- Running time: 22 mins
- Production company: Dashami Creations

Original release
- Network: Sony Entertainment Television
- Release: 25 September 2017 – 7 July 2023

Mere Sai – Shraddha Aur Saburi (transl. My Sai – Faith And Patience) is an Indian Hindi-language historical drama series which aired on Sony TV from 25 September 2017 to 7 July 2023. It starred Abeer Soofi initially from 2017-2019 and later on Tushar Dalvi from 2019-2023 in the lead role along with Kishori Godbole, Vaibhav Mangle in supporting roles. The show traces the journey of Sai Baba of Shirdi, a fakir who after witnessing the injustices due to religious and caste discrimination, faces several trials and tribulations on his journey to bring peace and love to the society. It is longest-running Indian television mythological series by episode count to cross the iconic milestone of 1000 episodes.

== Plot ==
The show broadly covers the life and teachings of Sai Baba of Shirdi, a 19th-century healer and spiritual leader who resides in the village of Shirdi in modern-day Maharashtra. Through his numerous acts of kindness, honesty, compassion, and nonviolence, he helps the people of Shirdi overcome their struggles by emphasizing values such as righteousness, humility, forgiveness, faith, and patience.

The show gently tackles various sociopolitical issues of the time while Sai Baba reforms egotistic individuals who initially hate him and his teachings. He shows them the path of Dharma and restores their faith in God.

== Cast ==
=== Main ===
- Tushar Dalvi as Sai Baba (2019–2023)
  - Abeer Soofi as Sai Baba (2017-2019)
  - Abhishek Nigam as Young Sai Baba (2017)
- Toral Rasputra / Kishori Godbole as Bayaza Bai/Bayaza Maa(2017-2019)/(2019-2023)(death)
- Vaibhav Mangle as Kulkarni Sarkar (2017–2020; 2021–2023)
  - Satish Salgare as Kulkarni Sarkar (2020)

=== Recurring ===
- Dhruti Mangeshkar as Jhipri 'Lakshmi' (child)
- Drisha Kalyani as Jhipri 'Lakshmi' (teenage)
- Ashwini Kasar as Jhipri 'Lakshmi' (adult)
- Himanshu Rai as Keshav Kulkarni
  - Syed Aman Mian Sharma as Young Keshav Kulkarni
- Khushboo Tawde as Tejaswi Keshav Kulkarni
- Priyanka Joshi Hait as Rukmini Vaini: Kulkarni's wife
- Anish Railkar as Pralhad Keshav Kulkarni (Keshav's son)
- Saurabh Shrikant as Tatya Patil
  - Rakshit Wahi as Young Tatya Patil
- Anjali Mishra as Rambha Tatya Patil
- Chirag Dave as Mhalsapati Ji
- Bhakti Chauhan/Anaya Soni as Parvati; Mhalsapati's wife
- Hemant Thatte/Vinayak Bhave as Appa Kote Patil
- Chhaya Phanse as Champa
  - Karishma Dharmendra Bhuta as young Champa
- Mahi Milan Kanani as Ragini
- Chandan Madan as Srikanth
- Ajunahi Barsaat AaheSharmila Shinde as Chihu Tai (Kulkarni's younger sister);Srikanth wife and Govinda's mother
- Bhupindder Bhoopii as Santa (2019–2023)
- Bhushan Dhupkar as Panta: Kulkarni's servant and as tuddu: Panta's younger brother(dual role) (2017–2018)
- Sanjay Wadekar as Panta (2019–2023)
- Vikas Verma as Uddhav
- Vikas Kumar as Ali
- Arsh Syed as Bheema
- Mrunali Shirke as Sanvari
- Piyush Singh as Bhanu
- Siddhant Karnick as Ganpat Rao
- Atul Patil as Shashikant
- Aaloak Kapoor as Gokuldas2
- Sushma Prashant as Appa Kote Patil's mother
- Yash Rajendra Karia as Bheema
- Anant Mahadevan as Bal Gangadhar Tilak
- Manav Soneji as Ali
- Vansh Sayani as Baal Sai
- Sonal Vengurlekar as Savitri
- Ruhanika Dhawan as Rama
- Raj Sharnagat as Narayan / Naveen
- Sneha Bhawsar as Sulakshana
- Shishir Sharma as Sateshwar
- Nishkarsh Dixit as Raghunath
- Arun Singh as Devidas
- Vivaek Srivastav as Nanasaheb Chandorkar
- Avtaar N Vaishnani as Keshav: Kulkarni's son - young
- Harpreet Singh Bindra as Anta: Kulkarni's servant
- Bippin Procha as Ranoji
- Mahesh Welkar as
- Tarun Khanna as Ratnakar Rao
- Siddarth Arya as Bal Sai
- Aishani Yadav as Yamuna: Mhalsapati's eldest daughter
- Mohammad Samar as Balram: Pari's cousin
- Amit Jaat as Tryambak: Bayaza Maa's younger brother
- Anupriya Parmar as Gunwanta Bai: Tryambak's wife
- Rajiv Mishra as Dilawar Ali
- Sangita Adhikari as Pandhari's wife
- Smita Dongre as Funtru Kaki
- Flora Saini as Suvarna Bai
- Supriya Pilgaonkar as Suhasini Bai: Appa Kote Patil's aunt
- Sneha Wagh as Tulsa
- Bhawana Meghwal as Nirali's mother
- Advait Soman as Uddhav
- Tasheen Shah as
  - Tara: Pari's cousin
  - Gayatri: Sopan's daughter
- Ketki Dave as Kamala: Champa's mother-in-law
- Shilpa Tulaskar as Saras
- Sandeep Bhojak As BrahmaNandam (2019)
- Niel Satpuda as Ali (2019)
- Jay Zaveri as Ganpat/Das Ganu Maharaj
- Shruti Bhist as Sumati
- Kalpesh Rajgor as Chintamani
- Aaditya Bajpayee as Mohan
- Anubhav Dixit as Digambar
- Anang Desai as Ganjanan
- Praneet Bhat as Madhusudan
- Pankaj Berry as Chakra Narayan
- Govind Khatri as Kakasaheb Dixit
- Amit Anand Raut as self in episodes 1012-1012 and promo of "Sai Vachan"
- Girish Oak as Khashaba
- Vikas Singh Rajput as Mahesh
- Prachi Vaishnav as Malti
- Vishwanath Kulkarni as Hemant
- Krishnakant Singh Bundela as Sadhu
- Apara Mehta as jhimri's aunt

== Production ==
The filming of the series which resumed after three months owing COVID-19 outbreak in India in late June was halted soon in early July until 7 July 2020 when a crew member was tested positive for the virus and the cast and crew were kept under quarantine.

== See also ==
- Shirdi Ke Sai Baba, a 1977 film starring Sudhir Dalvi as Sai Baba of Shirdi
- Sri Shirdi Saibaba Mahathyam, a 1986 Telugu film starring Vijayachander as Sai Baba of Shirdi
- Jagadguru Sri Shiridi Saibaba, a 2009 Telugu film starring B. V. Reddy as Sai Baba of Shirdi
- Shirdi Sai, a 2012 Telugu film starring Nagarjuna as Sai Baba of Shirdi
