= Kismat (TV series) =

- Genre: Drama
- Written by: Vikram Kapadia; Raja Ram; Raja Sevak
- Directed by: Naresh Malhotra
- Starring: See below
- Country of origin: India
- Original language: Hindi
- No. of seasons: 1
- No. of episodes: 64

Production
- Producer: Aditya Chopra
- Camera setup: Multi-camera
- Running time: Approx. 24 minutes
- Production company: YRF Television

Original release
- Network: Sony Entertainment Television
- Release: 14 February – 2 June 2011

Kismat (transl. Destiny) is an Indian drama television series which aired on Sony TV. The series is produced by YRF Television and premiered on 14 February 2011. It is an Indian adaptation of British author Jeffrey Archer's 1979 novel, Kane and Abel. The story is set in Mumbai, India. It revolves around the stories of two men born worlds apart. They have nothing in common except the same date of birth (15 August 1947) and a zeal to succeed in life. Aditya Raj Merchant is a wealthy and powerful industrialist while Kabir Khan is in a situation of great poverty.

== Synopsis ==
Kismat is a saga spread over sixty years that takes us through the lives of two men— Adityaraj Merchant and Kabir Khan, who share a strange karmic bond imposed by destiny.

Born on the same historic day of 15 August 1947, life takes them both through diverse experiences each on different paths, that ultimately define the course of their lives and their character as men.

Aditya Merchant, son of an affluent, successful industrialist Madhav Merchant and his wife Devika, also has an autocratic grandmother, Gayatri Devi, who is a big influence in his life. His life is charted out for him even before he is born and he has every privilege he could possibly ask for. But in return he must stay true to the Merchant name and the ideals of excellence that it is identified with and he must strive to always be the best in order to be worthy of that name. He learns early on in life that winning is all that matters, and at any cost.

Kabir Khan, on the other hand born to Muslim parents, miraculously finds refuge in a Hindu family's house in a downtrodden village near Hyderabad. He is nurtured and showered with love by his Hindu mother Gunwanthi and older sister Saraswathi. But not for long. Facing adversities at a very early age, Kabir has to soon fend for himself and deal with every possible misfortune that life throws at him. Beaten and honed in these hardships, Kabir is forged into a determined man focussed only on becoming rich, successful and powerful.

Destiny rules that both Aditya and Kabir's paths must cross and keep crossing.

In time, this immutable play of destiny brings Aditya and Kabir face-to-face in a conflict that has far reaching implications. A twist of fate, an unfortunate turn of events, coincidence, Kismat—all conspire to make this conflict grow bigger with each passing year until this tug of war between Aditya Merchant and Kabir Khan, for revenge, power and prestige eventually becomes their sole reason for existence.

== Cast ==
- Viraf Phiroz Patel as Aditya Raj Merchant
- Rahul Bagga as Kabir Khan
- Kirendeep Kaur Jogi as Mrinalini
- Aarun Nagar as Army Officer
- Rushad Rana as Hanif
- Shiv Kumar Subramaniam as Vishwanathan
- Siddhant Karnick as Madhav Merchant
- Jacqie Grewal as Gayatri Merchant
- Tanu Vidyarthi as Devika Merchant
- Khalida Khan as Sapna Khatau
- Rasika Dugal as Lubna
- Maj Bikramjeet Singh as Mubarak Khan
- Karuna Pandey as Jayashree / Saraswati
- Kavi Shastri as Vikramaditya Merchant (
- Kainaz Motivala as Tanya/Zulekha Khan Merchant
- Seema Kapoor
