= MTV Big F =

- Also known as: MTV Big F - Forbidden.First.Fantasies (Season 1) MTV Big F - Forbidden No More (Season 2)
- Genre: Romance; Thriller; Fantasy
- Created by: Sukesh Motwani and Mautik Tolia
- Presented by: Gautam Gulati - Season 1 Randeep Hooda - Season 2
- Country of origin: India
- Original language: Hindi
- No. of seasons: 2
- No. of episodes: 26

Production
- Editor: Manish Mistry
- Camera setup: Multi-camera
- Running time: approx. 42 minutes
- Production company: Bodhitree Multimedia

Original release
- Network: MTV India
- Release: 11 October 2015 – 4 June 2017

MTV Big F is a television anthology series broadcast by MTV India. It premiered on 11 October 2015, every Sunday. The show brings Gautam Gulati as host and deals with young people's forbidden fantasies by showcasing stories of young people in each episode. The second season was hosted by Bollywood actor Randeep Hooda which primarily revolves around the psyche of Indian women to explore their hidden desires.

== Host ==
- Gautam Gulati – season 1 (13 episodes)
- Randeep Hooda – season 2 (13 episodes)

== Cast ==
Main Leads

Season	Episode	Actor	Role
1	1	Priyal Gor	Shruti
1	1	Abhinav Shukla	Vikram
1	2	Megha Gupta	Raima
1	2	Rohit Suresh Saraf	Gyaan
1	3	Ruslaan Mumtaz	Abhimanyu
1	3	Tavneet Rekhi	Rajji
1	5	Plabita Borthakur	Anjali
1	5	Hasan Zaidi	Arjun
1	6	Asma Badar	Sarmishtha
1	6	Madhura Naik	Madhurima
1	6	Aditya Singh Rajput	Riteish
1	7	Neetha Shetty	Sakshi
1	7	Rohit Khandelwal	Varun
1	9	Krishna Mukherjee	Jia
1	9	Shravan Reddy	Maan
1	10	Bharat Chawda	Pawan
1	10	Puneet Vashist	Arjun
1	11	Abigail Jain	Jaya
1	11	Randeep Rai	Nakul

Season	Episode	Actor	Role
2	1	Shantanu Maheshwari	Terry
2	1	Cherry Mardia	Rashi
2	1	Mrinal Dutt	Akshay
2	2	Varun Sood	Daljeet
2	2	Mansi Srivastava	Dhapan
2	3	Akshaya Arvind Naik	Sanjana
2	3	Manish Anand	Vikram
2	4	Annie Gill	Madhu/Madhav
2	4	Siddhant Karnick	Sameer
2	6	Charu Mehra	Kiara Kumari
2	6	Viraf Patel	Samrat .S
2	8	Ahsaas Channa	Diya Dayal
2	8	Shubhashish Jha	Kabir
2	11	Nikhil Khurana	Karan
2	11	Unknown	Lavanya
2	11	Yuvraj Thakur	Zeeshan

== Season 1 ==
No. in season	Title	Original release date
1	"Fantasy and Rebellion"	11 October 2015
Shruti's marriage is arranged with Mohit (Mark Farokh Parakh), whom she barely knows. Shruti(Priyal Gor) loves Vikram (Abhinav Shukla) but she never dares to reveal it to Mohit. Mohit's inappropriate behavior gives Shruti the power to rebel.
2	"Love Just Happens"	18 October 2015
Gyan (Rohit Suresh Saraf) works in an advertising agency where he meets Raima (Megha Gupta), a woman few years older. He finds his colleagues belittling Raima but when he starts to get to know her, falls in love with her.
3	"Being Fat isn't a Shame"	25 October 2015
Rajji (Tavneet Rekhi) is a chubby young girl and her slim friends make fun of her. She falls in love with a tennis player, Abhimanyu (Ruslaan Mumtaz) who also happens to fall for her. Abhimanyu makes her realize her true worth.
4	"Business Meets Pleasure"	1 November 2015
Sagar (Skand Thakur) and Ahana (Jiya Shankar) are two people who meet by chance and get intimate as they are attracted. They give in to their desires without caring for the world
5	"Private Tutor"	8 November 2015
Anjali (Plabita Borthakur), a small town girl comes to Mumbai to chase her dreams of becoming a singer. She meets Arjun (Hasan Zaidi), who helps her regain the confidence.
6	"Girl's Love"	15 November 2015
Sharmishta (Asma Badar) is a lesbian who has not been able to express her desires. She and her best friend Riteish (Aditya Singh Rajput) both fall in love with a model named Madhurima (Madhura Naik).
7	"Pati, Patni aur Pilot."	22 November 2015
Sakshi (Neetha Shetty) is married to Pranav who never cares about her. Finally Varun (Rohit Khandelwal), a pilot makes Sakshi realize the importance of being a woman.
8	"The Unforgetable Coincidence"	29 November 2015
Aman (Parv Kaila) and Maya (Vaibhavi Upadhyay) get to know about each other on a social media platform with pseudo names. However, they coincidentally meet each other and fall in love. Later, they share intimate moments with each other.
9	"Love is Fair"	6 December 2015
Jia (Krishna Mukherjee) wants to enjoy her life like everyone but she is a handicap. She meets Maan (Shravan Reddy), who starts taking care of her and boosts her confidence. Gradually, Maan's love succeeds to make Jia stand up on her feet.
10	"Virtuous Love"	13 December 2015
A young virtuous man, Pawan happens to meet a super model, Carol who doesn't seem to win his confidence at first. But as Pawan spends more time with her, he ends up falling in love with her.
11	"Rebelling Against The Odds"	20 December 2015
Nakul (Randeep Rai) has a soft corner for his deceased brother's wife, Jaya (Abigail Jain). Eventually their attachment makes them fall in love. Their love gives Jaya the confidence to stand up for herself.
12	"Beauty lies in the eyes of the beholder"	27 December 2015
Armaan falls in love with his landlord's daughter Ishita who is under-confident because of a scar on her face. But Armaan helps her discover her true beauty.
13	"The Last Chapter"	3 January 2016
KD suffers from a stammering problem and is in love with Sameera, a beauty queen. Soon he realizes that Sameera too doesn't have an exciting life. Together they come out of their shells.

== Season 2 ==
No. in season	Title	Original release date
1	"Forbidden No More"	12 March 2017
Rashi (Cherry Mardia) takes up the challenge thrown at her by her misogynist fiancé, Akshay (Mrinal Dutt) as well as the society which always seems ready to label women as either the virtuous or the vamp. She finds herself questioning her values as she meets Terry (Shantanu Maheshwari), the lady-killer and a choreographer.
2	"Dil ye Ziddi hai"	19 March 2017
In a society that has set norms for the fairer sex, Dhapan (Mansi Srivastava) dares to break the shackles of age-old customs and traditions to follow her dreams. The 6th daughter of a dhobi inspires to be a national footballer. Being discouraged and held back by her family, her motivations comes in the form of her crush, Daljeet. (Varun Sood)
3	"Love comes in all size"	26 March 2017
Sanjana (Akshaya Arvind Naik), is a self-conscious girl who constantly faces body shaming from her mother and friends. She falls in love with Chef Vikram (Manish Anand) and fights to face her inner demons to do the impossible.
4	"A transgender love story"	2 April 2017
Born with the dream of becoming a model, Madhu finds herself caged in a man's body. Her struggle to accept the woman in her becomes more difficult when her family disowns her. Life takes an unexpected turn with Sameer's entry. Their paths cross and love blossoms. But she's soon betrayed by her friend who reveals Madhu's hidden dark secret. Will Madhu face her demons or surrender to fate?
6	"Steamy Office Romance"	17 April 2017
Meet Kiara (Charu Mehra), a small town girl with big city dreams, who joins as an intern in an advertising company, struggles to fit in. Her dedication and unfeigned charm attract her boss Samrat .S (Viraf Patel), but their relation earns sexist remark from colleagues. With her reputation and career at stake, she's cornered by her CEO's immoral advances. Will Kiara suffer in silence or fight?
8	"The Death Of Innocence"	26 April 2017
Young and wild Diya Dayal (Ahsaas Channa) studies in a boarding school. She loves to play pranks and has a huge crush on her teacher, Kabir (Shubhashish Jha). After her summer holidays, however, Diya is disturbed and violent. It is as if something has broken inside her. A concerned Kabir tries to reach out to her, but Diya seems cold and distant. Will Diya open up about her sexually abusive past in a biased world? Can she trust Kabir?
11	"Spoilt for choice!"	21 May 2017
Post her makeover, Lavanya is now the campus favourite! But wait... is she actually two timing her college friends?
