= Asma Badar =

Indian actress

Asma Badar is an Indian television and film actress.

== Early life ==
She was born on 11 January 1988 in Bhopal to a Muslim family.

== Career ==
In 2011 she was chosen to play the second lead in the Sahara One series Ganga Kii Dheej. Badar came into the limelight for the role of Naina in the daily soap Sasural Simar Ka on Colors TV. She was also in the TV series Lapataganj, Tujh Sang Preet, and Jodha Akbar.

She also appeared in the 2014 Kannada film Pungi Daasa. After that she did MTV Big F (2015), portraying the first same-sex kiss on Indian television with her co-actress Madhura Naik, and Tujhse Hai Raabta on ZEE TV (2019). she joined Zee TV show Jagriti Ek Nayi subah 2025
