= Madhura Naik =

Indian model and actress (born 1987)

- Born: Madhura Hemant Naik; 19 July 1984 (age 42); Indore, Madhya Pradesh, India
- Occupations: Actress, fashion model
- Years active: 2007–2020

Madhura Hemant Naik (born 19 July 1984) is an Indian model and actress who has appeared in television shows such as Kis Desh Mein Hai Meraa Dil, Pyaar Kii Ye Ek Kahani, Iss Pyaar Ko Kya Naam Doon, Hum Ne Li Hai- Shapath and Tumhari Pakhi.

== Personal life ==
She was born on 19 July 1984 to an Indian father and an Indian Israeli mother who is of Bene Israel origin and a part of the Jewish community in India. She was raised in Bahrain and had difficulty in Hindi in earlier days of her career.

Her cousin and brother-in-law were killed during the October 7 attacks.

== Career ==
Naik began her career as a model which led her to the music video "Umar Bhar" by Shael Oswal. She then worked in Bhaskar Bharti on Sony and Ek Nanad Ki Khushiyon Ki Chaabi… Meri Bhabhi. She played the lead in Hum Ne Li Hai- Shapath on Life OK during which she appeared in many live performances and stage shows with Life OK and Star. She also played Sheetal Kapoor in the popular Star Plus series Iss Pyaar Ko Kya Naam Doon.

She was a co-host on UTV Bindass' show Superdude. She appeared in a cameo role as a lawyer named Jaspreet, in Star Plus's daily soap Ek Nanad Ki Khushiyon Ki Chaabi… Meri Bhabhi. She was seen as Tanya Rana, on Life OK's Tumhari Pakhi. She played the grey role of Palomi, who loves lead actor in Tu Sooraj Main Saanjh, Piyaji. She portrayed a character in a same-sex relationship with the character played by Asma Badar in the television in the 2015 series MTV Big F.

== Social and political causes ==
Naik is an advocate for animal rights and volunteers for PETA in stop caging of birds. She integrated it as a promotional activity while shooting for Superdude.

== Filmography ==
=== Films ===
Year	Title	Role	Notes
2007	Good Boy, Bad Boy	Raju's Sister	
2009	Anolkhi Hey Ghar Maze	Siddhart’s Girlfriend	Marathi Movie
2010	Pyaar Impossible	Alisha's Friend	
2018	Looose Control	Komal	Marathi movie

=== Television ===
Year	Show	Role
2007	Kahe Naa Kahe	Neena
2007	Amber Dhara	Deema
2008	Sapna Babul Ka...Bidaai	Sonia
2008	Sangam	Kaveri
2008–2010	Kis Desh Mein Hai Meraa Dil	Maya Harman Juneja
2009-2010	Bhaskar Bharti	Aarti
2009	Shakuntala	Rajkumari Gauri
2010	Dill Mill Gayye	Suvarna Modi
2010	Fear Factor: Khatron Ke Khiladi 3	Contestant
2010	CID	Priya
2010-2011	Pyaar Kii Ye Ek Kahaani	Tanushree Ambolkar
2012	Superdude	Co-Host
2012	Hum Ne Li Hai... Shapath	Shikha
2012	Iss Pyaar Ko Kya Naam Doon?	Sheetal Kapoor
2013	Tumhari Paakhi	Tanya Rana
2013	Ek Nanad Ki Khushiyon Ki Chaabi… Meri Bhabhi	Jaspreet/Jas
2013	Uttaran	Nilofer
2014–2015	Comedy Classes	Shubhalaxmi
2014–2015	Tum Aise Hi Rehna	Aanchal
2015	Akbar Birbal	Qayamat Baano
2015	MTV Big F	Shreya
2016	Naagin	Mayuri
2017–2018	Tu Sooraj Main Saanjh, Piyaji	Palomi
2018	Tenali Rama	Queen Munmun
2018	Kaun Hai?	Nandini
2018	Breathe	Shaina
2018–2019	Kasautii Zindagii Kay	Madhuri
2020	Alif Laila	Dayan Hina

=== Web series ===
Year	Series	Role
2020	The Ghost Thesis	Preksha

== See also ==
- Israelis in India
- History of the Jews in India
