= Rushad Rana =

Indian actor

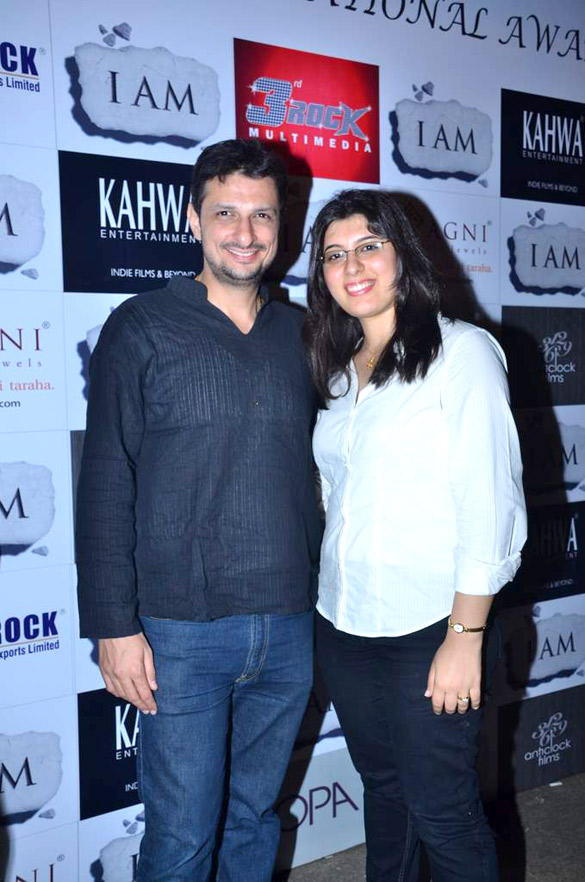
- Born: 19 November 1979 (age 46); Mumbai, Maharashtra, India
- Occupation: Actor
- Years active: 1998–present
- Spouse: Khushnum (m. 2010; div. 2013) Ketaki Walawalkar (m. 2023)

Rushad Rana (born 19 November 1979) is an Indian actor. Rana has worked in many hindi-language television shows and films. Some his notable works include- Hip Hip Hurray, Woh Rehne Waali Mehlon Ki, Sasural Simar Ka, Kehta Hai Dil Jee Le Zara, Kumkum Bhagya, Anupamaa and many other notable films.

== Early and personal life ==
Rana was born on 19 November 1979 in a Parsi family.

He married Khushnum in an arranged marriage in 2010 but the couple divorced in 2013 due to compatibility issues. Rana met Ketaki Walawalkar on a dating app and later the couple became close friends on the sets of Anupamaa where Walawalkar served as a creative director. The couple dated for around one year and later married on 4 January 2023.

== Filmography ==
=== Films ===
Year	Title	Role	Ref.
2000	Mohabbatein	Gurukul Student	
2000	Motiya Baba		
2004	Veer-Zaara	Sahir Farooqi	
2005	Mr Ya Miss	Ravi Prasad	
2005	Sarkar	Unknown	
2006	Dor	Amir Khan	
2008	Superstar		
2008	Rab Ne Bana Di Jodi		
2009	8 x 10 Tasveer	Adit Malhotra	
2009	Yeh Faasley	Manu	
2010	I Am	Rubina's brother	
2011	Shirin Farhad Ki Toh Nikal Padi	Hormuz	
2013	Gangoobai	Khushru Mistry	
2014	The Xposé	Prosecution Lawyer	
2015	The Path of Zarathustra	Perseus	
2015	Bumper Draw	Nariman	
2015	Calendar Girls	Aniruddh Shroff	
2016	Sanam Teri Kasam	Doctor	
2017	Maatr	Ravi Chauhan	
2017	Rangoon	Hoshang Billimoria	
2017	Aksar 2	Harish Raval	
2018	3rd Eye		
2019	Ekta	Philip	
2019	Firebrand	Advocate Freddie Mehta	
2021	Nail Polish	Yashpal Sharma	
2024	Ulajh	PM Shahzad Alam	

=== Television ===
Year	Show	Role	Notes
1998–2000	Hip Hip Hurray	Raghav	Debut Show
2000	Kyunki Saas Bhi Kabhi Bahu Thi	Guest Appearance	
2000	Ghar Ek Mandir	Siddharth Singhal	
2001–2002	Kasautii Zindagii Kay	Aniruddh Basu	
2002	Par Is Dil Ko Kaise Samjaye	Unknown	
2002–2005	Kehta Hai Dil	Nikhil Bhandari	
2004	Shaka Laka Boom Boom	Adult Sanju/Sandros	
2003–2004	Manshaa	Rhea's fiancee	
2005	Woh Rehne Waali Mehlon Ki	Karan	
2005–2006	India Calling	Dilawar	
2006–2009	Balighat Ka Bargad	Aniket	Supporting Role
2010–2011	Sanjog Se Bani Sangini	Rudra's brother	
2011	Kismat	Hanif	
2012	CID	Akash	Episodic Role
2013	Fear Files: Darr Ki Sacchi Tasvirein	Nitin	Guest Appearance
2013	Savdhaan India	Ishaan	Episodic Role
2013	Bade Achhe Lagte Hain	Shekhar	
2013–2014	Kehta Hai Dil Jee Le Zara	Anvay Goyal	
2014	Kaisi Yeh Yaariyan	Raghav	
2014–2015	Ajeeb Dastaan Hai Yeh	Saurabh Ganguly	
2014–2015	Itna Karo Na Mujhe Pyaar	Ronnie	Cameo Appearance
2015	Code Red	Rohit Shanbag	Episodic Role
2015	Gulmohar Grand	Acid	Episodic Role
2015–2016	Agent Raghav - Crime Branch	Rocky/Vineet Tandon	
2016–2017	Sasural Simar Ka	Sumit Kapoor	
2017–2019	Yeh Un Dinon Ki Baat Hai	Lochan Sir	
2017	Koi Laut Ke Aaya Hai	Devki Nandan Khatri	
2018	Kullfi Kumarr Bajewala	Unknown	
2018	Crime Patrol	Agent Raghav	Episodic Role
2018–2019	Muskaan	Balraj Bhisht	
2019	Shakti - Astitva Ke Ehsaas Ki	Advocate Navjot Chaddha	
2020–2021; 2023	Anupamaa	Aniruddh Gandhi	Supporting Role
2021–2023	Kumkum Bhagya	Vikram Kohli	
2023	Sapnon Ki Chhalaang	Rajesh Nayak	
2024	Mehndi Wala Ghar	Vijay "Vijju" Agarwal	
2025–2026	Mannat – Har Khushi Paane Ki	Ronnie Saluja	

=== Web series ===
Year	Show	Role	Notes
2019	The Verdict – State vs Nanavati	JRD Tata	
2020	The Raikar Case	Hansal Mehra	
2020	Ashram 3	Vipul Dahiya	
2020	Peshawar	Herat	
2021	Crashh	Ashwin Batra	Cameo Appearance
2022	The Great Indian Murder	Prateek Bharadwaj	
2022	Modern Love Mumbai	Zohaib	
2022	Miya Biwi Aur Murder	Abaas Meetha	
2022	Criminal Justice: Adhura Sach	Vicky Kumar	
2024	Tujhpe Main Fida	Rishi	Cameo Appearance
