= Himanshu Rai (actor) =

Indian actor

Himaanshuu Rai
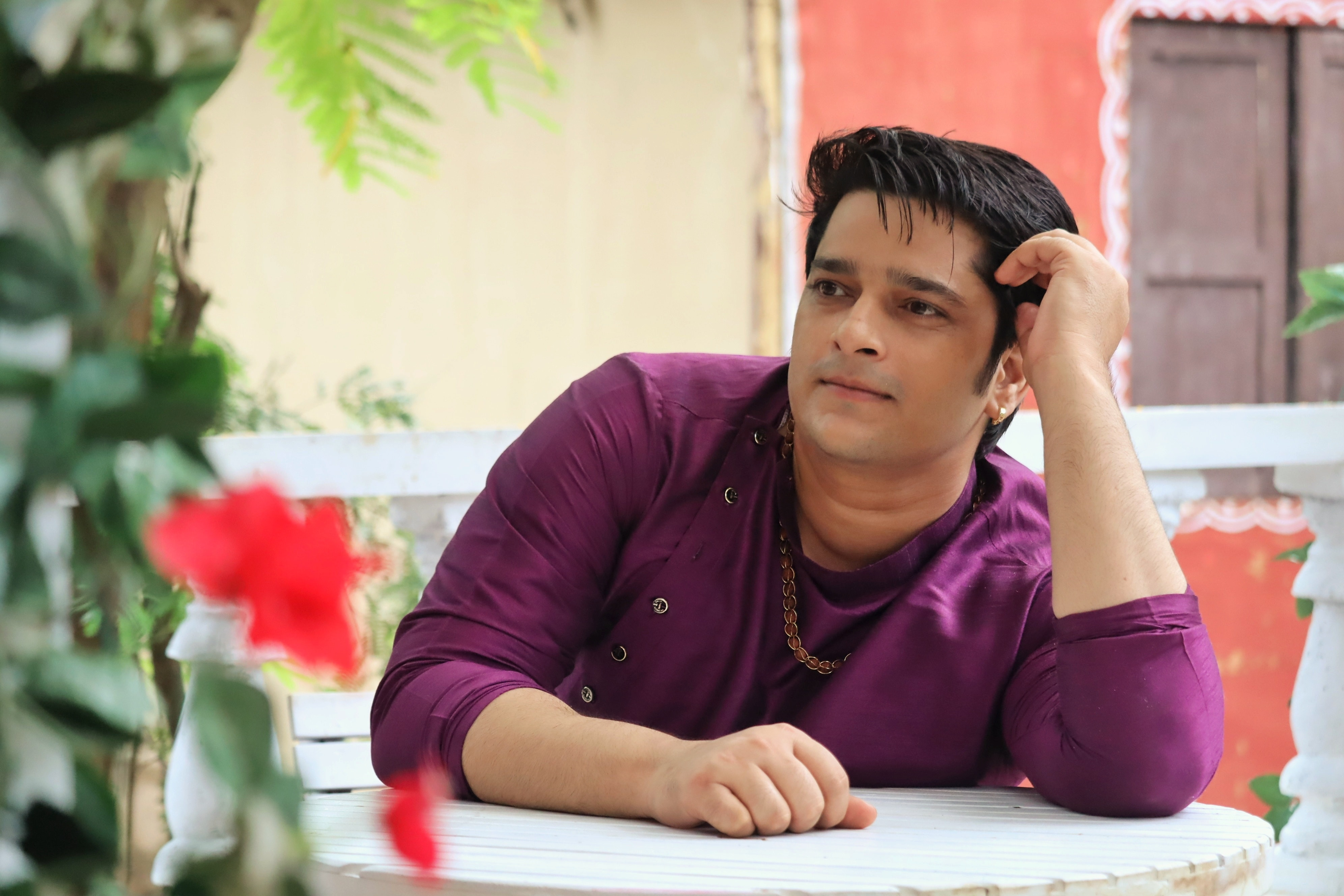
- Himaanshuu Rai
- Born: 12 October 1995 (age 30); Sherpur, Ghazipur, Uttar Pradesh.
- Occupation: Actor
- Years active: 2016
- Known for: Mere Sai - Shraddha Aur Saburi
- Notable work: Mere Sai - Shraddha Aur Saburi

Himaanshuu Rai is an Indian television actor known for his versatile performances in Hindi television. He gained recognition for portraying the prominent character Keshav Kulkarni in Mere Sai - Shraddha Aur Saburi. He was also seen playing the role of Kaushal Singh in Lekar Hum Deewana Dil on Dangal TV.

Himaanshuu Rai is wored on a television show titled Tees Ke Paar Jab Mila Pyar, where he portrayed the character of Prakhar Sarpotdar. With his screen presence and natural acting style, he continues to establish himself as a promising face in the Indian television industry.

== Early life and education ==
Himanshu Rai was born in the Sherpur, Ghazipur. He got his early education at Saraswati Shishu Mandir Dharanagar, Mohammadabad & Inter College Mohammadabad in Ghazipur, Uttar Pradesh, and completed his graduation from Veer Bahadur Singh Purvanchal University. He moved to Mumbai to pursue his career as an actor.

== See also ==
List of Indian television actors

== Television ==
Show	Channel	Production	Role
Mere Sai - Shraddha Aur Saburi	Sony Entertainment Television	Dashmi Creations	Keshav kulkarni (2019–2023)
Lekar Hum Deewana Dil	Dangal (TV channel)	Raj Khatri’s Production	Kaushal Singh (2024–25)
Tees Ke Paar Jab Mila Pyaar	Dangal (TV Channel)	Tale A Tell and Kunba Production	Prakhar Sarpotdar (2026)
