= Monica Khanna =

Indian actress

- Occupations: Actress; model
- Years active: 2010–present

Monica Khanna (born 7Aug 1986) is an Indian television actress and model. She is known for playing Karishma Joglekar in Aasman Se Aage, Payal Deewan in Pyaar Ka Dard Hai Meetha Meetha Pyaara Pyaara, and Shraddha Siakal in Thapki Pyar Ki.

== Television ==
Year	Title	Role	Notes
2010	Mahi Way	Roshni	
2010–2011	Crime Patrol	Various	
2011–2012	Afsar Bitiya	Swati Raj	
2012	Aasman Se Aage	Karishma Joglekar	
2013	Aaj Ki Housewife Hai... Sab Jaanti Hai	Neelam	
2013–2014	Pyaar Ka Dard Hai Meetha Meetha Pyaara Pyaara	Payal Talwar	
2015–2017	Thapki Pyar Ki	Shraddha Siakal	
2016	Ishq Ka Rang Safed	Shraddha Siakal	Episode 162
2018–2020	Ishq Subhan Allah	Zeenat Sheikh	
2020–2021	Prem Bandhan	Vandana Shastri	
2021	Chikoo Ki Mummy Durr Kei	Rangoli	
2023	Durga Aur Charu	Latika Banerjee	
2023–2024	Ikk Kudi Punjab Di	Tejinder Kaur	
2024	Dhruv Tara – Samay Sadi Se Pare	Urvashi	
2024–2025	Tulsi – Hamari Badi Sayani	Maala Raichand	
2025–present	Prathaon Ki Odhe Chunri: Bindani	Rumkudi	

== Awards and nominations ==
Year	Award	Category	Show	Result
2017	Golden Petal Awards	Best Actress in a Negative Role	Thapki Pyar Ki	Won
2019	Indian Telly Awards	Best Actress in a Negative Role	Ishq Subhan Allah	Nominated
