= Salimpur =

Village in India

Salempur is a village located at Patna district in Bihar, India. Its distance from the state capital is approximately 40 kilometres. One can reach Salimpur by train and bus via National Highway 31. The population, according to the 2011 census, is 3,223.
