= Chand Ke Paar Chalo (TV series) =

Indian television series

- Directed by: Deepak Sharma
- Starring: See below
- Country of origin: India
- No. of seasons: 1
- No. of episodes: 80

Production
- Producer: Gul Khan
- Running time: 23 minutes

Original release
- Network: NDTV Imagine
- Release: 29 September 2008 – 12 February 2009

Chand Ke Paar Chalo (transl. Let's go beyond the Moon) is an Indian television series that aired on NDTV Imagine from 29 September 2008 to 12 February 2009. The series starred Yami Gautam, Aham Sharma and Zalak Thakker.

This series marked the acting debut of the actors Yami Gautam, Aham Sharma and Divya Bhatnagar. This series also marked the debut of the production house 4 Lions Films.

== Plot ==
Chand Ke Paar Chalo is set in a Muslim Hindu backdrop in Lucknow. The story initially, is about three individuals, Sana–Rehaan–Anisa. Sana and Rehaan are two estranged childhood friends. Rehaan is taken to London by his mother, due to Rehaan's father's unexpected mysterious death, causing Sana–Rehaan's separation during their childhood. While, Anisa, is a happy-go-lucky girl from a lower middle class Muslim family living in Lucknow with her parents, who are neighbors and good friends of Rehaan's family.

The story starts with Sana and Rehaan, with preparations in Rehaan's mansion by his grandmother to welcome him back to India after several years. On the other hand, Sana lives with the memories of Rehaan in expectation that one day he will return. Over the years, Sana has fallen for Rehaan whereas Rehaan had forgotten her completely. When Rehaan returns to India, he reaches the same college of Sana–Anisa. Anisa, who always dreamt of getting married, falls head over heels for Rehaan. Then Rehaan realizes that he had been always in love with Sana. Anisa backs off when she learns, Rehaan loves Sana and selflessly, helps Rehaan win Sana's heart.

Then Anisa and her parents migrate to Mumbai and there the story shifts to Arjun–Anisa–Rahul. Anisa's family reach Mumbai, primarily because Anisa's father requires treatment and the big city will provide better facilities. Anisa wants to get a job. She feels that opportunities in Mumbai are far greater than in Lucknow, and she doesn't want her ill and weak father to have to struggle to provide for them in Lucknow. For her, Lucknow holds no charm.

After much struggle, she procures a job in one of Mumbai's biggest media houses – The Singhanias – who are the owners of a popular magazine: Desi Girls. She is hired by Arjun Singhania, the head honcho of this business empire, as his younger brother Rahul's personal assistant.

Arjun is tired of Rahul's philandering ways, which are likely to ruin a big merger he is planning with Rahul's fiancée's family. Arjun is convinced that Anisa is exactly the kind of girl whom Rahul will never dream of flirting with. Rahul, on the other hand, is appalled that he is saddled with a girl like Anisa, who, for him, is a social embarrassment.

Anisa tries hard to fit into her new world of glitz and glamour: a world where every girl is a size zero, where every man is flirtatious, where money talks and style defines one's worth. Anisa is thrown into a world where everyone looks down on her and treats her with disdain. The story continues with Anisa's struggle to make a place for herself and find happiness, love, and a unique identity.

== Cast and characters ==
=== Main ===
- Yami Gautam as Sana; A beautiful girl who is very quiet and serious. The manner in which she conducts herself in public is very humorless. Though from a Nawabi lineage her family has gone through a rough patch financially. She is very sensitive and can learn people's character deeply.
- Aham Sharma as Rehaan; A man in his mid-twenties who has been sent to London at a young age, by his over protective mother, when his father was murdered. He wanted to be back to Lucknow but his mother didn't allow him to do so. He focused on his studies when he was in London. He doesn't like to express his true feelings and is determined once he sets up his mind. He was always in love with Sana but never realized it, but once he returned to Lucknow and realises his feelings for Sana, he decides to fix their relationship as he falls madly in love with Sana, that he was unable live without her.
  - Rishabh Sharma as Young Rehaan
- Zalak Thakker as Anisa; An effervescent, gregarious, funny and uninhibited girl. She is from a lower middle-class family. Not of the sati-savitri types, she often speaks her mind. She firmly believes in living in the moment. Her spontaneity sometimes brings about clumsiness and disorganization. She is not interested in studying as she is dying to get married and have kids. She tries to drop out of university through any chance she gets. However, her mother keeps sending her back to school.
- Amar Upadhyay as Arjun Sighania; The head honcho of Sighania's business of magazines and newspapers, Arjun is heading this media empire since his father died less than half a year ago. He had to shoulder the weight of the whole business. He saw the empire deteriorate when his father died; everyone tried to take advantage of his naiveté. He does not want to see himself, his family name or business again in that vulnerable spot and is therefore highly protective of his brother. So he has arranged his brother’s marriage with a girl from an extremely influential family. He thinks that money is the only steadfast thing in this cut throat business world; Love has absolutely no space in his life.
- Vivan Bhatena as Rahul Sighania; A Casanova and cad who has been protectively brought up by his elder brother and has not seen the hard side of life because his family babied him. He is not serious about anything. Relationships to him are always casual. His mother is always pushing him to take more interest in work, and he is always turning a deaf ear to her pleas. He is engaged to Vanshika Mittal but thinks that it is a challenge to cheat beyond this relationship. He is looking to postpone marriage for as long as he can. Having affairs galore, he thinks it is a challenge to bed every girl he comes across. He is used to the best things of life and is not willing to grow up and get a mature grip of life. It is only when he starts feeling Anisa is a challenge and also finds her interesting, he starts acting mature for her sake.

=== Recurring ===
- Mahru Shaikh as Rehaan's mother
- Divya Bhatnagar
- Garima Vikrant Singh as Anisa's mother
- Neha Saraf
