= Blue Oranges =

- Directed by: Rajesh Ganguly
- Written by: Rajesh Ganguly Sreekanth Agneeaswaran [dialogue and lyrics]
- Produced by: Feroze Alameer
- Starring: Rajit Kapur; Harsh Chhaya; Aham Sharma; Rati Agnihotri
- Cinematography: Ranjan Kothari
- Edited by: Praveen P Kathikuloth
- Music by: Bipin; Ajay Panchal
- Release date: 18 September 2009
- Country: India
- Language: Hindi

Blue Oranges is a 2009 Indian Hindi-language film produced by S M Ferozeuddin Alameer under the Khussro Films banner and directed by Rajesh Ganguly. The film features Rajit Kapur, Rati Agnihotri, Harsh Chhaya, and Aham Sharma in key roles.

== Plot ==
The film is a crime, suspense thriller where Rajit Kapur plays the role of the detective Nilesh. Nilesh has to investigate the murder of a rich alcoholic woman (Pooja Kanwal). He investigates a bunch of suspects such as the murdered woman’s ex-lover (Aham Sharma), the tenant's son, a rich-brat who gave the woman a lift and the police commissioner's own brother (Harsh Chhaya) who had befriended her, before arriving at the truth. The film is shot in a flashback-and-forth mode of storytelling.

== Cast ==
- Rajit Kapur ... Nilesh
- Harsh Chhaya ... Anurag Dixit
- Rati Agnihotri ... Uma Dixit
- Aham Sharma ... Kevin Travasso
- Pooja Kanwal ... Shalini Chauhan
- Richashree ... Rati Bose
- Shishir Sharma ... Commissioner Dixit
- Shivani Joshi ... Rudra
- Anupam Shyam ... Ramprasad
- Akhil Mishra ... Mr. Goel
- Asheesh Kapur ... Hari Goel
- Rasika Joshi ... Mrs. Goel
- Javed Abedi ... Doctor
- Rajeev Acharya ... Principal
- Kamal Adib ... Sunil Mehra
- Imtiaz Amir ... Judge
- Honey Chhaya ... Old Man in jail
- Naina Dixit ... News Reader
- Yusuf Hussain ... Janak Raj Chauhan
- Alex Joseph ... Jail Warden
- Siddhant Karnick ... Aditya Mehra
- Bharat Kaul ... Mr. Mehta
- Moin Khan ... Man with Ranjit's wife
- Neeraj Kumar ... Ranjit
- Sujata Kumar ... Dr. Reddy
- Anjali Londhe ... Ranit's wife
- Jagruti Mehta ... Maid Servant
- Nandu ... Police with fax
- Chandrabhan Patel ... Drug Pedlar
- Himanshu Powdwal ... Control room investigator
- Jaspal Sandhu ... Jailor
- Simran Sawhney ... Henchman
- Savi Sidhu ... Mahadev (as Savi Siddhu)
- Satyendra Verma ... Lawyer

== Reception ==
The Times of India rated the movie 2.5/5 stars and although the movie was appreciated for being painstakingly crafted; it was criticized for being too dour and clinical and bereft of humour, pace and drama.

Subhash K Jha too rated the movie 2.5/5 stars and summed up his review as "If there are no highs in the narration, there are no plunging lows either" and singled out Rajit Kapur’s acting as the one stand-out performance.
