= Ojaswi Aroraa =

Indian television actress

- Born: Ojaswi Oberoi; 6 August 1985 (age 40); Mumbai, Maharashtra, India
- Occupation: Actress
- Years active: 2010–present
- Known for: Kya Hal, Mister Panchal

Ojaswi Aroraa (née Oberoi; born 6 August 1985) is an Indian television actress who has appeared in many Indian television series. She debuted on the small screen with Behenein on Star Plus. She has also acted in Aasman Se Aage, Devon Ke Dev...Mahadev, SuperCops vs Supervillains and Aahat.

== Career ==
Aroraa completed her graduation from Punjab University (1999–2003) before taking acting classes and settling as a TV artist.

She has been practicing Kathak dance for over 15 years and has performed in many stage shows (including STAR Parivaar Awards in 2011).

== Television ==
- Behenein as Anokhi
- Har Yug Mein Aayega Ek - Arjun (cameo)
- Aasman Se Aage as Meenakshi
- Devon Ke Dev...Mahadev as Mohini (cameo)
- SuperCops vs Supervillains as Meghna (cameo)
- Crime Patrol Meghna Verma (cameo)
- CID (Episode 1225 - Satara Mein CID) as Deepika (cameo)
- Aahat as Neha (cameo)
- Arjun as Meera (episodic)
- Pyaar Tune Kya Kiya as Shikha (episodic role)
- Adaalat as Renuka Jhukla (episodic)
- Brahmarakshas as Naina Yug Srivastav
- Badho Bahu as Kareena Sangwan
- Kya Hal, Mister Panchal as Pari Panchal
- Comedy Circus as herself
- Tera Kya Hoga Alia as Sonia
- Kuch Smiles Ho Jayein... With Alia as Sonia

== See also ==
- List of Hindi television actresses
- List of Indian television actresses
